= List of reality television show franchises (H–Z) =

The following is a list of reality television show franchises that have become franchises with production of local versions around the world, from H through Z. See also List of reality television show franchises (A–G).

== Idols ==
=== International versions ===
Franchise that is currently airing
Franchise with an upcoming season
Franchise that is not currently airing

Country/Region	Local title(s)	Network	Winners	Judges
Arab League^{8}	سوبر ستار (Super Star)	Future TV	Season 1 (2003): Diana Karazon; Season 2 (2004): Ayman Alatar; Season 3 (2005–06): Ibrahim El Hakami; Season 4 (2007): Marwan Ali; Season 5 (2008): Elie Bitar	Elias Rahbani (1–5); Abdullah Al Qaoud (1–5); Tonia Moreeb (1); Fadia Tenb Al Hadj (2–4); Ziad Botrous (3–5); Gihan El-Naser (5)
Arab League^{8}	Arab Idol	MBC 1	Season 1 (2011–12): Carmen Suleiman; Season 2 (2013): Mohammed Assaf; Season 3 (2014): Hazem Sharif; Season 4 (2016–17): Yacoub Shaheen	Ragheb Alama (1–2); Ahlam (1–4); Hassan El Shafei (1–4); Nancy Ajram (2–4); Wael Kfoury (3–4)
Arab League^{8}	Saudi Idol	MBC 1	Season 1 (2023): Hams Fekri	Aseel Abu Bakr; Assala; Ahlam; Majid Al Mohandis
Armenia	Հայ Սուպերսթար (Hay Superstar)	Shant TV	Season 1 (2006): Susanna Petrosyan; Season 2 (2006–07): Lusine Aghabekyan; Season 3 (2007–08): Lusi Harutyunyan; Season 4 (2009–10): Raffi Ohanian; Season 5 (2011–12): Sona Rubenyan; Season 6 (2025): Areg Galstyan	Egor Glumov (1–4, 6); Michael Poghosyan (1–4); Naira Gurjianyan (1–4); Leila Saribekyan (5); Avet Barseghyan (5); Garik Papoyan (5); André (5–6); Syuzanna Melqonyan (6); Sona Sarkisyan (6)
Australia	Australian Idol	Current; Seven Network (8–); Former; Network Ten (1–7)	Season 1 (2003): Guy Sebastian; Season 2 (2004): Casey Donovan; Season 3 (2005): Kate DeAraugo; Season 4 (2006): Damien Leith; Season 5 (2007): Natalie Gauci; Season 6 (2008): Wes Carr; Season 7 (2009): Stan Walker; Season 8 (2023): Royston Sagigi-Baira; Season 9 (2024): Dylan Wright; Season 10 (2025): Marshall Hamburger; Season 11 (2026): Kesha Oayda; Season 12 (2027): Upcoming season	Current; Marcia Hines (1–7, 9–); Amy Shark (8–); Morgan Evans (12–); Former; Mark Holden (1–5); Ian "Dicko" Dickson (1–2, 5–7); Jay Dee Springbett (7 semi-finals onwards); Meghan Trainor (8); Harry Connick Jr (8); Kyle Sandilands (3–6, 7 (auditions), 8–11)
Bangladesh	Bangladeshi Idol	SA TV	Season 1 (2013): Mong Uching Marma	Andrew Kishore; Ayub Bachchu; Ferdausi Rahman; Mehreen Mahmud
Belgium	Idool	VTM	Season 1 (2003): Peter Evrard; Season 2 (2004): Joeri Fransen; Season 3 (2007): Dean Delannoit; Season 4 (2011): Kevin Kayirangwa	Jean Blaute (1–4); Jan Leyers (1–2); Nina De Man (1–2); Bart Brusseleers (1–2); Vera Mann (3); Herman Schueremans (3); Patrick Carbonez (3); Sylvia Van Driessche (4); Wouter Van Belle (4); Koen Buyse (4)
Brazil	Ídolos	SBT (1–2); RecordTV (3–7)	Season 1 (2006): Leandro Lopes; Season 2 (2007): Thaeme Mariôto; Season 3 (2008): Rafael Barreto; Season 4 (2009): Saulo Roston; Season 5 (2010): Israel Lucero; Season 6 (2011): Henrique Lemes; Season 7 (2012): Everton Silva	Arnaldo Saccomani (1–2); Cyz Zamorano (1–2); Thomas Roth (1–2); Carlos Eduardo Miranda (1–2); Luiz Calainho (3–5); Paula Lima (3–5); Marco Camargo (3–7); Luiza Possi (6); Rick Bonadio (6); Fafá de Belém (7); Supla (7)
Brazil	Ídolos Kids	RecordTV	Season 1 (2012): Fernando Franco; Season 2 (2013): Julia Tavares	Afonso Nigro; João Gordo; Kelly Key
Bulgaria^{1}	Music Idol	bTV	Season 1 (2007): Nevena Tsoneva; Season 2 (2008): Toma Zdravkov; Season 3 (2009): Magi Djanavarova	Yordanka Hristova (1); Slavi Trifonov (1); Gloria (1); Doni (1, 3); Vili Kazasyan (2); Dimitar Kovalchev – Funky (2–3); Esil Duran (2); Lucy Diakovska (2); Maria (3)
Cambodia	Cambodian Idol	Hang Meas HDTV	Season 1 (2015): Ny Ratana; Season 2 (2016): Chhin Manich; Season 3 (2017–18): Kry Thaipov; Season 4 (2022): Lim Tichmeng; Season 5 (2024): Ki Savin	Aok Sokunkanha; Nop Bayyareth; Chhorn Sovannareach; Preap Sovath (1–3); Sok Seylalin (4–5)
Cambodia	Cambodian Idol Junior	Hang Meas HDTV	Season 1 (2019): Phoeun Sopheap; Season 2 (2023): Sam Lida	Sok Seylalin (1–2); Preap Sovath (1); Chhorn Sovannareach (1); Sokun Nisa (2); Zono (2)
Canada	Canadian Idol	CTV	Season 1 (2003): Ryan Malcolm; Season 2 (2004): Kalan Porter; Season 3 (2005): Melissa O'Neil; Season 4 (2006): Eva Avila; Season 5 (2007): Brian Melo; Season 6 (2008): Theo Tams	Farley Flex; Jake Gold; Sass Jordan; Zack Werner
China	中国梦之声 Chinese Idol	DragonTV	Season 1 (2013): Li Xiangxiang; Season 2 (2014): Zheng Xingqi	Han Hong (1–2); Huang Xiaoming (1); Coco Lee (1); Wang Wei-chung (1); Vivian Hsu (2); Richie Jen (2); Guo Jingming (2)
Colombia	Idol Colombia	RCN Televisión	Season 1 (2014): Luis Ángel Racini	Peter Manjarres; Rosario; Alejandro Villalobos; Eddy Herrera
Croatia	Hrvatski Idol	Nova TV	Season 1 (2003–04): Žanamari Lalić; Season 2 (2004–05): Patrick Jurdić	Đorđe Novković; Miroslav Škoro; Nikša Bratoš; Goran Karan
Croatia	Hrvatska traži zvijezdu	RTL	Season 1 (2009): Bojan Jambrošić; Season 2 (2010): Kim Verson; Season 3 (2011): Goran Kos	Tony Cetinski; Goran Lisica-Fox; Ivana Mišerić (3); Anđa Marić (2); Jelena Radan (1)
Croatia	Superstar	RTL	Season 1 (2023): Hana Ivković; Season 2 (2024): Karla Miklaužić	Severina; Tonči Huljić; Filip Miletić; Nika Turković
Czech Republic	Česko hledá SuperStar	TV Nova	Season 1 (2004): Aneta Langerová; Season 2 (2005): Vlastimil Horváth; Season 3 (2006): Zbyněk Drda	Leoš Mareš; Ondřej Hejma; Ilona Csáková; Eduard Klezla
Czech Republic; Slovakia	SuperStar (Česko Slovenská Superstar)	TV Nova; Markíza	Season 1 (2009): Martin Chodúr; Season 2 (2011): Lukáš Adamec; Season 3 (2013): Sabina Křováková; Season 4 (2015): Emma Drobná; Season 5 (2018): Tereza Mašková; Season 6 (2020): Barbora Piešová; Season 7 (2021): Adam Pavlovčin; Season 8 (2026): Current season	Current; Pavol Habera (1–); Ewa Farna (3, 8–); Calin (8–); Jakub Prachař (8–); Former; Leoš Mareš (6–7); Monika Bagárová (6–7); Patricie Pagáčová (6–7); Marián Čekovský (6–7); Matěj Ruppert (5); Ben Cristovao (5); Katarína Knechtová (5); Marta Jandová (1, 4); Ondřej Soukup (3–4); Klára Vytisková (4); Rytmus (2); Gabriela Osvaldová (2); Helena Zeťová (2); Dara Rolins (1); Ondřej Hejma (1)
Denmark	Idols	TV3	Season 1 (2003): Christian Mendoza; Season 2 (2004): Rikke Emma Niebuhr	Thomas Blachman; Kjeld Wennick; Henriette Blix; Carsten Krøyer
East Africa^{9}	Idols	DStv	Season 1 (2008): Eric Moyo	Lebogang Mzwimbi; Thato Matlhabaphiri; Angela Angwenyi; Trevor Siyandi; Kawesa Richard
Estonia	Eesti otsib superstaari	TV3	Season 1 (2007): Birgit Õigemeel; Season 2 (2008): Jana Kask; Season 3 (2009): Ott Lepland; Season 4 (2011): Liis Lemsalu; Season 5 (2012): Rasmus Rändvee; Season 6 (2015): Jüri Pootsmann; Season 7 (2018): Uudo Sepp; Season 8 (2021): Alika Milova; Season 9 (2023): Ant Nurhan	Rein Rannap (1–4, 6); Heidy Purga (1–2; guest judge 5); Mihkel Raud (1–5, 7–9); Maarja-Liis Ilus (3–6); Mart Sander (5); Tanel Padar (6); Jarek Kasar (6); Koit Toome (7–9); Eda-Ines Etti (7); Birgit Sarrap (8–9)
Finland	Idols	MTV3 (1–7); Nelonen (8–9)	Season 1 (2003–04): Hanna Pakarinen; Season 2 (2005): Ilkka Jääskeläinen; Season 3 (2007): Ari Koivunen; Season 4 (2008): Koop Arponen; Season 5 (2011): Martti Saarinen; Season 6 (2012): Diandra Flores; Season 7 (2013): Mitra Kaislaranta; Season 8 (2017): Anniina Timonen; Season 9 (2018): Patrik Blomberg	Jone Nikula (1–7, 9); Asko Kallonen (1, 3); Hannu Korkeamäki (1); Nanna Mikkonen (1); Nina Tapio (2–5); Kim Kuusi (2); Jarkko Valtee (2); Patric Sarin (4); Sami Pitkämö (5); Laura Voutilainen (6); Tommi Liimatainen (6); Sini Sabotage (7); Jussi 69 (7); Lauri Ylönen (7); Antti Tuisku (8); Erin (8); Jurek Reunamäki (8); Elastinen (9); Maija Vilkkumaa (9); Jannika B (9)
France^{3}	Nouvelle Star (A la Recherche de la Nouvelle Star)	M6 (1–8; 13); D8 (9–12)	Season 1 (2003): Jonatan Cerrada; Season 2 (2004): Steeve Estatof; Season 3 (2005): Myriam Abdelhamid; Season 4 (2006): Christophe Durier; Season 5 (2007): Julien Doré; Season 6 (2008): Amandine Bourgeois; Season 7 (2009): Soan; Season 8 (2010): Luce; Season 9 (2012–13): Sophie-Tith Charvet; Season 10 (2013–14): Mathieu Saikaly; Season 11 (2015): Emji; Season 12 (2016): Patrick Rouiller; Season 13 (2017): Xavier Matheu	André Manoukian (1–12); Dove Attia (1–5); Varda Kakon (1); Lionel Florence (1); Marianne James (2–5); Manu Katché (2–5); Sinclair (6–7, 9–12); Lio (6–8); Philippe Manœuvre (6–8); Marco Prince (8); Maurane (9–10); Olivier Bas (9–10); Elodie Frégé (11–12); Yarol Poupaud (11); JoeyStarr (12); Benjamin Biolay (13); Dany Synthé (13); Cœur de pirate (13); Nathalie Noennec (13)
Georgia	ჯეოსტარი Geostar	Rustavi 2	Season 1 (2006): Tinatin Chulukhadze; Season 2 (2007): Ani Kekua; Season 3 (2008): Giorgi Sukhitashvili; Season 4 (2009): Nodiko Tatishvili; Season 5 (2010): Oto Nemsadze; Season 6 (2011): Marita Rokhvadze	Marina Beridze (3–6); Levan Tsuladze (3–5); Lana Kutateladze (3, 5); Vakhtang Kikabidze (4); Sopho Khalvashi (6); Gigi Dedalamazashvili (6); Niko Nergadze (6)
Georgia	საქართველოს ვარსკვლავი Georgian Idol - Sakartvelos Varskvlavi	Rustavi 2 (1–2); Imedi TV (3–4)	Season 1 (2012): Luka Zakariadze; Season 2 (2013): Nina Sublatti; Season 3 (2018–19): Oto Nemsadze; Season 4 (2019): Tornike Kipiani	
Georgia	ჩვენ ვარსკვლავები ვართ We Are The Stars - Chven-Varskvlavebi Vart	Imedi TV	Season 1 (2017): Mananiko Tsenteradze	
Germany^{4}	Deutschland sucht den Superstar	RTL	Season 1 (2002–03): Alexander Klaws; Season 2 (2003–04): Elli Erl; Season 3 (2005–06): Tobias Regner; Season 4 (2007): Mark Medlock; Season 5 (2008): Thomas Godoj; Season 6 (2009): Daniel Schuhmacher; Season 7 (2010): Mehrzad Marashi; Season 8 (2011): Pietro Lombardi; Season 9 (2012): Luca Hänni; Season 10 (2013): Beatrice Egli; Season 11 (2014): Aneta Sablik; Season 12 (2015): Severino Seeger; Season 13 (2016): Prince Damien; Season 14 (2017): Alphonso Williams; Season 15 (2018): Marie Wegener; Season 16 (2019): Davin Herbrüggen; Season 17 (2020): Ramon Roselly; Season 18 (2021): Jan–Marten Block; Season 19 (2022): Harry Laffontien; Season 20 (2023): Sem Eisinger; Season 21 (2024): Christian Jährig; Season 22 (2026): Menowin Fröhlich	Current; Dieter Bohlen (1–18, 20–); Bushido (22–); Isi Glück (22–); Former; Thomas Bug (1–2); Shona Fraser (1–2); Thomas M. Stein (1–2); Sylvia Kollek (3); Heinz Henn (3–4); Anja Lukaseder (4–5); Andreas Läsker (5); Nina Eichinger (6–7); Volker Neumüller (6–7); Fernanda Brandão (8); Patrick Nuo (8); Natalie Horler (9); Bruce Darnell (9); Bill Kaulitz (10); Tom Kaulitz (10); Mateo Jaschik (10); Kay One (11); Mietze Katz (11); Marianne Rosenberg (11); Mandy Capristo (12); DJ Antoine (12); Heino (12); Vanessa Mai (13); Michelle (13–14); H.P. Baxxter (13–14); Shirin David (14); Ella Endlich (15); Mousse T. (15); Carolin Niemczyk (15); Oana Nechiti (16–17); Pietro Lombardi (16–17, 20–21); Xavier Naidoo (16–17); Maite Kelly (18); Mike Singer (18); Ilse DeLange (19); Toby Gad (19); Florian Silbereisen (19); Katja Krasavice (20); Leony (20); Beatrice Egli (21); Loredana (21)
Germany^{4}	Deutschland sucht den Superstar Kids	RTL	Season 1 (2012): Marco Kappel	Dieter Bohlen; Michelle Hunziker; Dana Schweiger
Greece	Super Idol	Mega TV	Season 1 (2004): Stavros Konstantinou	Elena Katrava; Konstantis Spyropoulos; Ilias Psinakis
Greece	Greek Idol	Alpha TV	Season 1 (2010): Valando Tryfonos; Season 2 (2011): Panagiotis Tsakalakos	Petros Kostopoulos (1–2); Dimitris Kontopoulos (1); Maro Theodoraki (1); Kostas Kapetanidis (1–2); Elli Kokkinou (1)
Iceland	Idol stjörnuleit	Stöð 2	Season 1 (2003–04): Kalli Bjarni; Season 2 (2004–05): Hildur Vala Einarsdóttir; Season 3 (2005–06): Snorri Snorrason; Season 4 (2009): Hrafna Hanna Elísa Herbertsdóttir; Season 5 (2023): Saga Matthildur Árnadóttir; Season 6 (2024): Anna Fanney Kristinsdóttir	Bubbi Morthens (1–3); Sigga Beinteins (1–3); Þorvaldur Bjarni þorvaldsson (1–2); Páll Óskar (3); Einar Bárðarson (3); Björn Jörundur Friðbjørnsson (4); Selma Björnsdóttir (4); Jón Ólafsson (4); Herra Hnetusmjör (5–6); Birgitta Haukdal (5–6); Bríet (5–6); Daníel Ágúst Haraldsson (5–6)
India	Indian Idol	SET	Season 1 (2004–05): Abhijeet Sawant; Season 2 (2005–06): Sandeep Acharya; Season 3 (2007): Prashant Tamang; Season 4 (2008–09): Sourabhee Debbarma; Season 5 (2010): Sreeram Chandra; Season 6 (2012): Vipul Mehta; Season 9 (2017): L. V. Revanth; Season 10 (2018): Salman Ali; Season 11 (2019–20): Sunny Hindustani; Season 12 (2020–21): Pawandeep Rajan; Season 13 (2022–23): Rishi Singh; Season 14 (2023–24): Vaibhav Gupta; Season 15 (2024-25): Manasi Ghosh; Season 16 (2025-26): Jyotirmayee Nayak	Current; Vishal Dadlani (8–); Shreya Ghoshal (12–); Badshah (13-); Former; Farah Khan (1–2, 7); Sonu Nigam (1–2, 7); Javed Akhtar (3–4); Alisha Chinai (3); Udit Narayan (3); Kailash Kher (4); Sonali Bendre (4); Sunidhi Chauhan (5–6); Salim Merchant (5–6); Asha Bhosle (6, after auditions); Javed Ali (8); Anu Malik (1–10); Sonu Kakkar (10); Neha Kakkar (8–11); Himesh Reshammiya (9–11); Kumar Sanu (12)
India	Indian Idol Junior	SET	Season 7 (2013): Anjana Padmanabhan; Season 8 (2015): Ananya Sritam Nanda	Vishal Dadlani (1–2); Shreya Ghoshal (1); Shekhar Ravjiani (1); Salim Merchant (2); Shalmali Kholgade (2, during auditions); Sonakshi Sinha (2)
India	Indian Idol Marathi	Sony Marathi	Season 1 (2021–22): Sagar Mhatre	Ajay Gogavale; Atul Gogavale
India	Telugu Indian Idol	Aha	Season 1 (2022): BVK Vagdevi; Season 2 (2023): Soujanya Bhagavatula; Season 3 (2024): Nazeeruddin Shaik; Season 4 (2025): Brinda	Current; Thaman S (1-); Karthik (1-); Geeta Madhuri (2-); Former; Nithya Menen (1)
India	Tamil Idol	SonyLIV	Season 1 (2026): Current season	Current; A. R. Rahman (1-)
Indonesia	Indonesian Idol	RCTI	Season 1 (2004): Joy Destiny Tobing; Season 2 (2005): Mike Mohede; Season 3 (2006): Ihsan Tarore; Season 4 (2007): Rini Wulandari; Season 5 (2008): Aris; Season 6 (2010): Igo Pentury; Season 7 (2012): Regina Ivanova; Season 8 (2014): Nowela Auparay; Season 9 (2017–2018): Maria Simorangkir; Season 10 (2019–2020): Lyodra Ginting; Season 11 (2020–2021): Rimar Callista; Season 12 (2022-2023): Salma Salsabil; Season 13 (2024-25): Shabrina Leanor; Season 14 (2025-26): Celyna Grace	Current: Judika (9–); Rossa (6, 11–); Bunga Citra Lestari (9-10, 12–); Maia Estianty (9-11, 13-); Soleh Solihun (14-); Former; Titi DJ (1–5, 8); Meuthia Kasim (1–2); Dimas Djayadiningrat (1–3); Indra Lesmana (1–5); Indy Barends (3); Jamie Aditya (4); Agnez Mo (6–7); Erwin Gutawa (7); Ahmad Dhani (7–8); Tantri Syalindri (8); Anang Hermansyah (4-8,10-13); Ari Lasso (9–11); Armand Maulana (9); David Bayu (12); Reza "Arap" Oktovian (14) (hiatus)
Indonesia	Indonesian Idol Junior	MNCTV (1–2); RCTI (3)	Season 1 (2014–2015): Johanes Tinambunan; Season 2 (2016–2017): Sharon Padidi; Season 3 (2018): Anneth Delliecia	Daniel Mananta (1–2); Regina Ivanova (1); Titi DJ (1); Irvnat (1); Vidi Aldiano (2); Nola AB Three (2); Rossa (3); Rizky Febian (3); Maia Estianty (3); Rayi Putra (3)
Iraq	Iraq Idol	MBC Iraq	Season 1 (2021): Ali Leo; Season 2 (2022): Afraa Sultan	Saif Nabeel; Hatem Al Iraqi; Rahma Riad
Kazakhstan	SuperStar KZ	Current; Qazaqstan (5–); Former; Channel One Eurasia (1–4)	Season 1 (2003–04): Almas Kishkenbayev; Season 2 (2004–05): Kayrat Tuntekov; Season 3 (2005–06): Nurzhan Kermenbayev; Season 4 (2007): Oleg Karezin; Season 5 (2026): Current season	Current: Yerbolat Bedelkhan (5-); Lyayla Sultan-Kyzy (1,5-); Makpal Isabekova (5-); Former; Batyrkhan Shukenov (1); Roman Rayfeld (1); Arman Murzagaliev (1); Dariga Nazarbayeva (2); Almaz Amirseitov (2); Oleg Markov (2); Diana Snegina (2); Nagima Eskalieva (3–4); Ludmila Kim (3); Kayrat Kulbayev (3); Igor Sirtsov (3); Taras Boichenko (4); Serik Akishev (4)
Kurdistan	Kurd Idol	Kurdsat	Season 1 (2017): Jinda Kanjo	Bijan Kamkar; Kanî; Adnan Karim; Nizamettin Ariç
Latin America	Latin American Idol	Sony Channel	Season 1 (2006): Mayré Martínez; Season 2 (2007): Carlos Peña; Season 3 (2008): Margarita Henríquez; Season 4 (2009): Martha Heredia	Erika de la Vega (1–4); Monchi Balestra (1–3); Jon Secada (1–4); Mimi (2–4); Gustavo Sánchez (1–3); Oscar Mediavilla (4)
Malaysia	Malaysian Idol	8TV; TV3	Season 1 (2004): Jaclyn Victor; Season 2 (2005): Daniel Lee	Paul Moss; Roslan Aziz; Fauziah Latiff
Maldives	Maldivian Idol	Television Maldives	Season 1 (2016): Laisha Junaid; Season 2 (2017): Mohamed Thasneem; Season 3 (2018): Aishath Azal Ali Zahir	Ahmed Ibrahim (1); Ibrahim Zaid Ali (1–2); Unoosha (1–3); Ismail Affan (2–3); Zara Mujthaba (3)
Myanmar	Myanmar Idol	MNTV (1-3); Channel 9 (4)	Season 1 (2015–2016): Saw Lah Htaw Wah; Season 2 (2016–2017): Thar Nge; Season 3 (2018): Phyo Myat Aung; Season 4 (2019): Esther Dawt Chin Sung	Chan Chan (1); Ye Lay (1); May Sweet (1–2); Myanmar Pyi Thein Than (2–3); Tin Zar Maw (2–4); Myo Kyawt Myaing (3); Yan Aung (3); Aung Ko Latt (4); Phyu Phyu Kyaw Thein (4)
Nepal	Nepal Idol	AP1TV	Season 1 (2017): Buddha Lama; Season 2 (2018): Ravi Oad; Season 3 (2019–2020): Sajja Chaulagain; Season 4 (2021): Bhupendra Thapa Magar; Season 5 (2024): Karan Pariyar; Season 6 (2025): Ganga Sonam	Nyhoo Bajracharya (1–3, 5–6); Kali Prasad Baskota (1–3, 5–6); Indira Joshi (1–3, 5–6); Sambhujeet Baskota (4); Sugam Pokharel (4); Subani Moktan (4)
Nepal	Nepal Idol Junior	AP1TV	Season 1 (2026): Upcoming season	TBA; TBA; TBA; TBA
Netherlands	Idols	RTL 4	Season 1 (2002–03): Jamai Loman; Season 2 (2003–04): Boris Titulaer; Season 3 (2005–06): Raffaëla Paton; Season 4 (2007–08): Nikki Kerkhof; Season 5 (2016): Nina den Hartog; Season 6 (2017): Julia van Helvoirt	Edwin Jansen (1–2); Henkjan Smits (1–3); Eric Van Tijn (1–4); Jerney Kaagman (1–4); John Ewbank (4); Gordon Heuckeroth (4); Martijn Krabbé (5–6); Ronald Molendijk (5–6); Jamai Loman (5–6); Eva Simons (5–6)
New Zealand	NZ Idol	TVNZ 2	Season 1 (2004): Ben Lummis; Season 2 (2005): Rosita Vai; Season 3 (2006): Matt Saunoa	Frankie Stevens (1–3); Fiona McDonald (1); Paul Ellis (1–2); Jackie Clarke (2); Iain Stables (3); Megan Alatini (3)
Nigeria	Nigerian Idol	Various	Season 1 (2010–11): Yeka Onka; Season 2 (2011–12): Mercy Chinwo; Season 3 (2012–13): Moses Obi-Adigwe; Season 4 (2013–14): Evelle; Season 5 (2014–15): K-Peace; Season 6 (2021): Kingdom Kroseide; Season 7 (2022): Progress Chukwuyem; Season 8 (2023): Victory Gbakara; Season 9 (2024): Chima Udoye; Season 10 (2025): Purp	Jeffrey Daniel (1–3); Yinka Davies (1–3); Audu Maikori (1); Charly Boy (2); Femi Kuti (3); Naeto C (3); Darey (4–5); Nneka (4); Dede Mabiaku (4–5); Obi Asika (6-8); Seyi Shay (6); DJ Sose (6); D'banj (7–8); Simi (7–8); 9ice (9); Omawumi (9-10); Ric Hassani (9–10); Iyanya (10)
North Macedonia	Macedonian Idol	Current; MRT(2–); Former; A1TV(1)	Season 1 (2010–11): Ivan Radenov; Season 2 (2027): Upcoming season	Current: TBA (2–); TBA (2–); TBA (2–); Former; Kaliopi Bukle (1); Igor Džambazov (1); Toni Mihajlovski (1)
Norway	Idol	TV 2	Season 1 (2003): Kurt Nilsen; Season 2 (2004): Kjartan Salvesen; Season 3 (2005): Jorun Stiansen; Season 4 (2006): Aleksander Denstad With; Season 5 (2007): Glenn Lyse; Season 6 (2011): Jenny Langlo; Season 7 (2013): Siri Vølstad Jensen; Season 8 (2014): Ingvar Olsen; Season 9 (2016): Marius Samuelsen; Season 10 (2018): Øystein Herkedal Hegvik; Season 11 (2020): Mari Eriksen Bølla	Jan Fredrik Karlsen (1–2, 5); Ole Evenrud (1, 3); Morten Ståle Nilsen (1); Lena Midtveit (1); Anneli Drecker (2); Douglas Carr (2); Thomas Strzelecki (2); Tone-Lise Skagefoss (3–4); Tor Milde (3–4); David Eriksen (3); Amund Bjørklund (4); Hans Olav Grøttheim (4); Asbjørn Slettemark (5); Benedicte Adrian (5); Mariann Thomassen (5); Bertine Zetlitz (6); Marion Ravn (6); Hans-Erik Dyvik Husby (6); Gunnar Greve (6–10); Tone Damli (7–8); Kurt Nilsen (7–8); Esben Selvig (7–8); Ina Wroldsen (9); Øyvind Sauvik (9); Sandeep Singh (9); Tshawe Baqwa (10–11); Silje Larsen Borgan (10–11); Andreas Haukeland (11)
Norway	Idol Junior	TV 2	Season 1 (2014): Mathilde Spurkeland	Alejandro Fuentes; Aleksander With; Margaret Berger; Sandra Lyng
Pakistan	Pakistan Idol	Geo Entertainment (1); Various (2-)	Season 1 (2014): Zamad Baig; Season 2 (2025-26): Hira Qaisar	Hadiqa Kiani (1); Ali Azmat (1); Bushra Ansari (1); Fawad Khan (2); Bilal Maqsood (2); Rahat Fateh Ali Khan (2); Zeb Bangash (2)
Philippines	Philippine Idol	ABC	Season 1 (2006): Mau Marcelo	Ryan Cayabyab; Pilita Corrales; Francis Magalona
Philippines	Pinoy Idol	GMA Network	Season 1 (2008): Gretchen Espina	Ogie Alcasid; Jolina Magdangal; Wyngard Tracy
Philippines	Idol Philippines	ABS-CBN (1); Kapamilya Channel (2); A2Z (2); TV5 (2)	Season 1 (2019): Zephanie Dimaranan; Season 2 (2022): Khimo Gumatay	Regine Velasquez (1–2); Moira Dela Torre (1–2); Vice Ganda (1); James Reid (1); Gary Valenciano (2); Chito Miranda (2)
Philippines	Idol Kids Philippines	Kapamilya Channel	Season 1 (2025): Alexa Mendoza	Regine Velasquez; Angeline Quinto; Juan Karlos; Gary Valenciano
Poland	Idol	Polsat	Season 1 (2002): Alicja Janosz; Season 2 (2002–03): Krzysztof Zalewski; Season 3 (2003–04): Monika Brodka; Season 4 (2005): Maciej Silski; Season 5 (2017): Mariusz Dyba	Elżbieta Zapendowska (1–5); Jacek Cygan (1–4); Robert Leszczyński (1–4); Kuba Wojewódzki (1–2, 4); Marcin Prokop (3); Maciej Maleńczuk (3); Janusz Panasewicz (5); Ewa Farna (5); Wojciech Łuszcykiewicz (5)
Portugal	Ídolos	SIC	Season 1 (2003–04): Nuno Norte; Season 2 (2004–05): Sérgio Lucas; Season 3 (2009–10): Filipe Pinto; Season 4 (2010-11): Sandra Pereira; Season 5 (2012): Diogo Piçarra; Season 6 (2015): João Couto; Season 7 (2022): Eduardo Gonçalves	Sofia Morais (1–2); Manuel Moura Dos Santos (1–5); Luis Jardim (1–2); Ramón Galarza (1–2); Laurent Filipe (3–4); Roberta Medina (3–4); Pedro Boucherie Mendes (3–4, 6); Bárbara Guimarães (5); Tony Carreira (5); Pedro Abrunhosa (5); Paulo Ventura (6); Maria João Bastos (6); Martim Sousa Tavares (7); Joana Marques (7); Ana Bacalhau (7); Tatanka (7)
Puerto Rico	Idol Puerto Rico	WAPA-TV	Season 1 (2011): Christian Pagán; Season 2 (2012): Gremal Maldonado; Season 3 (2013): Marileyda Hernández	Topy Mamery (1–3); Ricardo Montaner (1–2); Yolandita Monge (2); Erika Ender (1); Jerry Rivera (1); Milly Quezada (3); Noel Schajris (3); Elvis Crespo (3)
Puerto Rico	Idol Kids Puerto Rico	WAPA-TV	Season 1 (2012): Edgard Hernández; Season 2 (2013): Christopher Rivera	Erika Ender (1); Edgardo Diaz (1–2); Florentino Primera (1); Servando Primera (1); Ana Isabelle (2); Kany Garcia (2)
Romania	SuperStar România (SuperStar Romania)	Pro TV	Season 1 (2021): Alessandro Mucea	Smiley; Raluka; Marius Moga; Carla's Dreams
Russia^{6}	Народный Артист (People's Artist)	Rossiya 1	Season 1 (2003): Aleksey Goman; Season 2 (2004): Ruslan Alehno; Season 3 (2006): Amarkhuu Borkhuu	Evgeniy Fridlyand (1,3); Larisa Dolina (1); Anton Komolov (1); Tigran Keosayan (1–2); Laima Vaikule (2); Kim Breitburg (2); Artur Gasparyan (2); Maksim Dunayevsky (3); Gennady Khazanov (3); Alena Sviridova (3)
Serbia and Montenegro; Macedonia	Idol	RTV BK Telecom	Season 1 (2003–04): Cveta Majtanović; Season 2 (2005): Mina Laličić	Saša Dragić; Petar Janjatović; Biljana Bakić; Mirko Vukomanović
Singapore	Singapore Idol	MediaCorp	Season 1 (2004): Taufik Batisah; Season 2 (2006): Hady Mirza; Season 3 (2009): Sezairi Sezali	Dick Lee (1–3); Florence Lian (1–3); Ken Lim (1–3); Douglas Oliverio (1); Jacintha Abisheganaden (2)
Slovakia	Slovensko hľadá SuperStar	STV (1–2); Markíza (3)	Season 1 (2004–05): Katka Koščová; Season 2 (2005–06): Peter Cmorik; Season 3 (2007): Vierka Berkyová	Laco Lučenič (1–3); Pavol Habera (1–3); Lenka Slaná (1); Julo Viršík (1–2); Jana Hubinská (2); Dara Rolins (3)
South Africa	Idols	M-Net; Mzansi Magic	Season 1 (2002): Heinz Winckler; Season 2 (2003): Anke Pietrangeli; Season 3 (2005): Karin Kortje; Season 4 (2007): Jody Williams; Season 5 (2009): Jason Hartman and Sasha-Lee Davids; Season 6 (2010): Elvis Blue; Season 7 (2011): Dave van Vuuren; Season 8 (2012): Khaya Mthethwa; Season 9 (2013): Musa Sukwene; Season 10 (2014): Vincent Bones; Season 11 (2015): Karabo Mogane; Season 12 (2016): Noma Khumalo; Season 13 (2017): Paxton Fielies; Season 14 (2018): Yanga Sobetwa; Season 15 (2019): Luyolo Yiba; Season 16 (2020): Zama Khumalo; Season 17 (2021): Berry Trytsman; Season 18 (2022): Thapelo Molomo; Season 19 (2023): Thabo Ndlovu	Somizi Mhlongo (11–19); Thembi Seete (18–19); JR (18–19); Randall Abrahams (1–17); Unathi Nkayi (7–17); Gareth Cliff (1–12); Mara Louw (2–9); Dave Thompson (1–5); Marcus Brewster (1); Penny Lebyane (1)
South Africa	Idols (Afrikaans version)	kykNET	Season 1 (2006): Dewald Louw	Mynie Grové; Deon Maas; Taliep Petersen
Spain	Idol Kids	Telecinco	Season 1 (2020): Índigo Salvador; Season 2 (2022): Carla Zaldívar	Omar Montes (2); Edurne (1); Carlos Jean (1); Isabel Pantoja (1); Ana Mena (2); Ángeles Muñoz (2); Dioni Martín (2)
Sweden	Idol	TV4	Season 1 (2004): Daniel Lindström; Season 2 (2005): Agnes Carlsson; Season 3 (2006): Markus Fagervall; Season 4 (2007): Marie Picasso; Season 5 (2008): Kevin Borg; Season 6 (2009): Erik Grönwall; Season 7 (2010): Jay Smith; Season 8 (2011): Amanda Fondell; Season 9 (2013): Kevin Walker; Season 10 (2014): Lisa Ajax; Season 11 (2015): Martin Almgren; Season 12 (2016): Liam Cacatian Thomassen; Season 13 (2017): Chris Kläfford; Season 14 (2018): Sebastian Walldén; Season 15 (2019): Tusse Chiza; Season 16 (2020): Nadja Holm; Season 17 (2021): Birkir Blær; Season 18 (2022): Nike Sellmar; Season 19 (2023): Cimberly Wanyonyi; Season 20 (2024): Margaux Flavet; Season 21 (2025): Tuva Råwall; Season 22 (2026): Current season	Current; Anders Bagge (5–11, 13–); Katia Mosally (17–); Peg Parnevik (20-); Oliver Norqvist (22-); Former; Ash Pournouri (20-21); Alexander Kronlund (13–19); Kishti Tomita (1–4, 13–19); Nikki Amini (12–16); Fredrik Kempe (12); Quincy Jones III (12); Alexander Bard (8–11); Laila Bagge (5–11); Pelle Lidell (8); Andreas Carlsson (5–7); Daniel Breitholtz (1–4); Peter Swartling (1–4); Claes af Geijerstam (1–3)
Turkey	Türkstar	Kanal D	Season 1 (2004): Emrah Keskin	Ahmet San; Armağan Çağlayan; Ercan Saatçi; Zerrin Özer
United Kingdom (original)	Pop Idol	ITV	Season 1 (2001–02): Will Young; Season 2 (2003): Michelle McManus	Nicki Chapman; Simon Cowell; Neil Fox; Pete Waterman
United States^{6}	American Idol	Fox (1–15); ABC (16–)	Season 1 (2002): Kelly Clarkson; Season 2 (2003): Ruben Studdard; Season 3 (2004): Fantasia Barrino; Season 4 (2005): Carrie Underwood; Season 5 (2006): Taylor Hicks; Season 6 (2007): Jordin Sparks; Season 7 (2008): David Cook; Season 8 (2009): Kris Allen; Season 9 (2010): Lee DeWyze; Season 10 (2011): Scotty McCreery; Season 11 (2012): Phillip Phillips; Season 12 (2013): Candice Glover; Season 13 (2014): Caleb Johnson; Season 14 (2015): Nick Fradiani; Season 15 (2016): Trent Harmon; Season 16 (2018): Maddie Poppe; Season 17 (2019): Laine Hardy; Season 18 (2020): Just Sam; Season 19 (2021): Chayce Beckham; Season 20 (2022): Noah Thompson; Season 21 (2023): Iam Tongi; Season 22 (2024): Abi Carter; Season 23 (2025): Jamal Roberts; Season 24 (2026): Hannah Harper; Season 25 (2027): Upcoming season	Current; Lionel Richie (16–); Luke Bryan (16–); Carrie Underwood (23–); Former; Paula Abdul (1–8; guest judge 19); Simon Cowell (1–9); Randy Jackson (1–12); Kara DioGuardi (8–9); Ellen DeGeneres (9); Jennifer Lopez (10–11, 13–15); Steven Tyler (10–11); Mariah Carey (12); Nicki Minaj (12); Keith Urban (12–15); Harry Connick Jr. (13–15); Katy Perry (16–22)
Vietnam	Vietnam Idol; Thần Tượng Âm Nhạc: Vietnam Idol (1–4); Thần Tượng Âm Nhạc Việt Nam (4–7)	HTV7; HTV9 (1–2); VTV3; VTV6; VTV9 (3–8)	Season 1 (2007): Phương Vy; Season 2 (2008–09): Quốc Thiên; Season 3 (2010): Uyên Linh; Season 4 (2012–13): Ya Suy; Season 5 (2013–14): Nhật Thủy; Season 6 (2015): Trọng Hiếu; Season 7 (2016): Janice Phương; Season 8 (2023): Hà An Huy	Siu Black (1–3); Nguyễn Tuấn Khanh (1); Hà Hùng Dũng (1); Trần Mạnh Tuấn (2); Hồ Hoài Anh (2); Nguyễn Quang Dũng (3–8); Đặng Diễm Quỳnh (3); Quốc Trung (3–4); Mỹ Tâm (4–5, 8); Trương Anh Quân (4–5); Thanh Bùi (6); Thu Minh (6–7); Bằng Kiều (7); Huy Tuấn (8)
Vietnam	Vietnam Idol Kids (Thần Tượng Âm Nhạc Nhí)	VTV3	Season 1 (2016): Hồ Văn Cường; Season 2 (2017): Thiên Khôi	Tóc Tiên; Issac; Văn Mai Hương
West Africa^{11}	Idols	M-Net	Season 1 (2007): Timi Dakolo	Dede Mabiaku; Abrewa Nana; Dan Foster

=== Winner competitions ===
Region	Series title	Network	Winner	Judges
Asia^{12}	Asian Idol	India: Sony TV; Indonesia: RCTI; Malaysia: 8TV; Philippines: ABC; Singapore: MediaCorp TV Channel 5; Vietnam: HTV9	Season 1 (2007): Hady Mirza	Anu Malik (India); Indra Lesmana (Indonesia); Paul Moss (Malaysia); Pilita Corrales (Philippines); Ken Lim (Singapore); Siu Black (Vietnam)
World^{13}	World Idol	Germany: RTL Television; United Kingdom: ITV; Norway: TV 2; United States: Fox; Canada: CTV; Australia: Network Ten; Belgium: vtm; Poland: Polsat; The Netherlands: RTL 4; Arab States: Future TV; South Africa: M-NET	Season 1 (2003): Kurt Nilsen	Randall Abrahams (South Africa); Simon Cowell (representing United States, also judge on original UK show); Nina De Man (Belgium); Ian "Dicko" Dickson (Australia); Shona Fraser (Germany); Jan Fredrik Karlsen (Norway); Elias Rahbani (Lebanon); Henkjan Smits (Netherlands); Pete Waterman (United Kingdom); Zack Werner (Canada); Kuba Wojewódzki (Poland)

=== Notes ===
1. Citizens of Macedonia were eligible to participate in the third season.
2. Citizens of Hong Kong, Macau, and Taiwan are eligible to participate throughout the series.
3. Citizens of Wallonia and Québec were eligible to participate in the first season.
4. Citizens of Austria and Switzerland are eligible to participate throughout the series.
5. Citizens of Cyprus were eligible to participate in Super Idol.
6. Citizens of Belarus and Ukraine were eligible to participate in the first and second season.
7. Citizens of Puerto Rico were eligible to participate in the eighth season.
8. Countries whose citizens were eligible to participate include all the member states of the Arab League.
9. Countries whose citizens were eligible to participate include: Botswana, Burundi, Comoros, Djibouti, Ethiopia, Eritrea, Kenya, Lesotho, Madagascar, Malawi, Mauritius, Mozambique, Namibia, Réunion (a part of France), Rwanda, Seychelles, Somalia, Swaziland, Tanzania, Uganda, Zambia and Zimbabwe.
10. Countries whose citizens were eligible to participate include all of the Latin American countries, with the exception of Brazil.
11. Countries whose citizens were eligible to participate include: Benin, Burkina Faso, Cape Verde, Côte d'Ivoire, Gambia, Ghana, Guinea, Guinea-Bissau, Liberia, Mali, Mauritania, Niger, Nigeria, Saint Helena, Senegal, Sierra Leone and Togo.
12. Winners of Indian Idol, Indonesian Idol, Malaysian Idol, Philippine Idol, Singapore Idol, SuperStar KZ, and Vietnam Idol participated in Asian Idol, in which the winner was determined the greatest percentage of votes.
13. Winners of inaugural seasons of American Idol, Australian Idol, Canadian Idol, Deutschland sucht den Superstar, Idool, Idols (Dutch version), Idols (South African version), Idol (Polish version), Idol (Norwegian version), Pop Idol, and SuperStar (Arab version) participated in World Idol, in which the winner was determined by the most collective points given by each of the other participating countries (similar to the Eurovision Song Contest).

== Iron Chef ==
Country	Local name	Host	Network	Date premiered
Australia	Iron Chef Australia	Grant Denyer	Seven Network	October 2010
Israel	קרב סכינים; Krav Sakinim	Oded Menashe	Channel 10	2007
Thailand	Iron Chef Thailand	Chakrit Yamnam	Channel 7	25 January 2012
United States	Iron Chef USA	William Shatner	UPN	2001 (only two episodes produced)
United States	Iron Chef America	Alton Brown	Food Network	16 January 2005
United States	The Next Iron Chef	Alton Brown and Mark Dacascos	Food Network	7 October 2007
United Kingdom	Iron Chef UK	Olly Smith and Nick Nairn	Channel 4	26 April 2010
Vietnam	Iron Chef Vietnam	Bình Minh; Chi Bảo	VTV3	6 May 2012
Vietnam	The Next Iron Chef Vietnam	Nguyễn Danh Tùng	VTV3	18 November 2012

== Just the Two of Us ==
Currently airing franchise
Status unknown
Franchise with an upcoming season
Franchise no longer in production

Country	Name	Channel	Hosts	Judges	Air date
Armenia	Երկու աստղ	Public Television Company of Armenia (2007-2010, 2025-present) Eskiz Studio (2007) Sharm Holding (2007-2008) Sigma TV (2009-2010)	Hrachya Keshishyan (2007); Suren Rshtuni (2007-2008); Eduard Petrosyan (2009-2010)	Hrant Tokhatyan (2007) Shushan Petrosyan (2007, 2009) Felix Khachatryan (2007-2009) Emmy (2008) Ashot Lyudvigovich (2009) Mamikon Simonyan (2009-2010) Karina Danelyan (2009-2011)	30 March 2007 – 31 January 2010; 26 April 2025 – present
Australia	It Takes Two	Seven Network	Grant Denyer; Terasa Livingstone (season 1); Kate Ritchie (season 2); Erika Heynatz (season 3)	Marina Prior; James Valentine; Ross Wilson; Amanda Pelman	28 May 2006 – 22 April 2008
Belgium	Just the Two of Us	vtm	Staff Coppens; Evi Hanssen	Dirk Blanchart; Hilde Norga; Sofie; Zaki	21 October 2006 - ?
China	Just the Two of Us	Hunan Television			mid-2000s
Croatia	Zvijezde pjevaju	HRT	Barbara Kolar; Duško Čurlić	Ksenija Erker (2007–2012); Rajko Dujmić (2007–2012); Martina Tomčić (2007–2009, 2011–2014); Husein Hasanefendić (2007–2010); Vanna (2010–2012); Zdenka Kovačiček (2014); Zrinko Tutić (2014); Danijela Martinović (2019–); Miroslav Škoro (2019); Valentina Fijačko (2019); Mirela Priselac Remi (2019–2020); Jurica Pađen (2020– May 2022); Marko Tolja (2020–); Zorica Kondža (March -May 2022); Mario Lipovšek Battifiaca (October 2022-)	7 April 2007 – present
Czech Republic	Duety... když hvězdy zpívají	Czech Television	Tereza Kostková; Aleš Háma	Michael Prostějovský; Ota Balage; Linda Finková; Lubomír Brabec	2009
Estonia	Laulud tähtedega	TV3	Marko Matvere (2008); Karin Rask (2008); Eda-Ines Etti (2010); Madis Milling (2010)	Jaanus Nõgisto (2008); Anu Tali (2008); Jüri Makarov (2008); Mihkel Raud (2010); Maarja-Liis Ilus (2010); Peeter Rebane (2010)	5 October 2008 – 16 May 2010
Germany	It Takes 2	RTL	Daniel Hartwich; Julia Krüger	Conchita Wurst; Álvaro Soler; Angelo Kelly	15 January - 12 February 2017
Greece	Just the 2 of Us	Mega Channel	Giorgos Kapoutzidis (season 1); Zeta Makrypoulia (season 2); Doukissa Nomikou (backstage, season 1); Dimitris Ouggarezos (backstage, season 2)	Stefanos Korkolis (season 1); Kostas Tournas (season 1); Athinais Nega (season 1); Lydia Papaioannou (season 1); Giorgos Theofanous (season 2); Roula Koromila (season 2); Dimitris Arvanitis (season 2, show 1-6); Krateros Katsoulis (season 2, show 7-12)	17 October 2010 – 18 June 2014
Greece	Just the 2 of Us	Open TV	Nikos Koklonis; Vicky Kavoura (backstage, season 3); Laura Karaiskou (backstage, season 4)	Despina Vandi; Stamatis Fasoulis; Vicky Stavropoulou; Maria Bakodimou	14 March – 26 December 2020; 2026
Greece	Just the 2 of Us	Alpha TV	Nikos Koklonis; Katerina Stikoudi (backstage)	Despina Vandi; Stamatis Fasoulis; Vicky Stavropoulou; Katy Garbi (season 6-8); Maria Bakodimou (season 5)	25 September 2021 – 5 July 2024
Netherlands	Just the Two of Us	Tien	Linda de Mol; Gordon Heuckeroth	Cornald Maas; Margriet Eshuijs; Rob Stenders; Esther Hart	11 March – 30 April 2007
Netherlands	It Takes 2	RTL 4 SBS6	???	???	12 March 2016 – 14 June 2019
Poland	Just the Two of Us. Tylko nas dwoje	Polsat	Katarzyna Cichopek; Mariusz Kałamaga	Irena Santor; Tomasz Karolak; Dorota Rabczewska	13 March – 15 May 2010
Russia	Две звезды	Channel One	Lolita Milyavskaya & Alexander Tsekalo (1 season); Alla Pugacheva & Maxim Galkin (2 season);Ksenia Sobchak, Tatiana Lazareva & Tina Kandelaki (3 season); Dmitry Nagiev & Nonna Grishaeva (4 season); Dmitry Nagiev & Anastasia Zavorotnyuk (5 season); Dmitry Nagiev & Zhanna Badoeva (6 season) Alexander Oleshko & Aglaya Shilovskaya (7 Season)	Sergey Mazaev, Igor Matvienko, Nadezhda Babkina, Yana Churikova, Vladimir Korobka, Lev Leshchenko, Ilya Reznik, Valentina Talyzina (1 season, 2006). Ilya Reznik, Barbara Brylska, Garik Martirosyan, Vladimir Matetsky (2 season, 2007 — 2008). Andrey Malakhov, Igor Matvienko, Yuri Nikolaev, Igor Krutoy, Ilya Reznik, Vladimir Matetsky, Garik Martirosyan, Dmitry Dibrov, Lev Leshchenko, Svetlana Morgunova, Gennady Khazanov, Viktor Drobysh, Iosif Kobzon, Mikhail Boyarsky, Philip Kirkorov (3 season, 2009). Lolita Milyavskaya, Igor Matvienko, Mikhail Boyarsky, Valentin Yudashkin, Svetlana Morgunova, Viktor Drobysh, Dmitry Dyuzhev, Elena Obraztsova, Vladimir Matetsky, Tamara Gverdtsiteli (4 season, 2012). Igor Matvienko, Mikhail Boyarsky, Elena Obraztsova, Valentin Yudashkin, Laima Vaikule, Nikolay Rastorguev, Vladimir Matetsky, Viktor Drobysh, Larisa Dolina (5 season, 2013). Maxim Galkin, Valeria, Dmitry Pevtsov, Olga Drozdova, Soso Pavliashvili, Igor Vernik, Vadim Vernik, Yuri Malikov, Dmitry Malikov, Elena Vaenga, Leonid Yarmolnik, Kristina Orbakaite, Stanislav Piekha, Nikolai Fomenko, Mikhail Boyarsky, Lev Leshchenko, Aida Garifullina, Igor Krutoy, Nonna Grishaeva, Alexander Oleshko, Aglaya Shilovskaya, Valery Syutkin, Valdis Pelsh, Anna Ardova, Vladimir Vinokur, Larisa Dolina, Dmitry Dyuzhev, Alexandra Zakharova, Ani Lorak, Ekaterina and Alexander Strizhenov, Larisa Guzeeva, Natalia Podolskaya, Vladimir Presnyakov Jr., Igor Matvienko, Gennady Khazanov, Igor Nikolaev (6 season, 2021—2022).	
Turkey	Şarkı Söylemek Lazım	Show TV	Behzat Uygur; Zeynep Tokuş	Olcayto Ahmet Tuğsuz (Season 1); Erol Büyükburç (Season 1); Fuat Güner (Season 1); İnci Çayırlı (Season 1); Oray Eğin (Season 1); Eyşan Özhim (Season 1); Zeynep Talu (Season 2); Özdemir Erdoğan (Season 2); Ayşe Özyılmazel (Season 2)	2007-2008
Vietnam	Cặp đôi hoàn hảo	VTV3	Thanh Ngọc (season 1–2); Phan Anh (season 1–3); Trấn Thành (season 2); Vy Oanh (season 2); Cát Phượng (season 3)	Lê Hoàng (season 1–2); Siu Black (season 1); Lê Minh Sơn (season 1–2); Lưu Thiên Hương (season 2); Thanh Bạch (season 3); Quang Linh (season 3); Bảo Lan (season 3)	9 October 2011 – 18 January 2015

== Love Island ==
Currently airing franchise
Franchise with an upcoming season
Franchise no longer airing
Upcoming franchise
Status unknown

Country/Region	Title	Network	Seasons and winners	Presenter(s)	Narrator(s)
Albania	Love Island Albania	TV Klan	Season 1, 2023: Arlind Gashi & Ueda Ndrecaj	Luana Vjollca	Genti Deçka
Australia	Love Island Australia	Current; 9Now (4-); Former; 9Go! (1); Nine Network (2–3)	Season 1, 2018: Grant Crapp & Tayla Damir; Season 2, 2019: Josh Packham & Anna McEvoy; Season 3, 2021: Mitch Hibberd & Tina Provis; Season 4, 2022: Austen Bugeja & Claudia Bonifazio; Season 5, 2023: Kale Roberts & Tyra Johannes; Season 6, 2024: Em Miguel Leigh & Mercedes Knox; Season 7, 2025: Kye Lambert & Yana Marks; Season 8, 2026: Current season	Sophie Monk	Current; Eoghan McDermott (1–2, 4–); Former; Stephen Mullan (3)
Canada (Quebec)	L'île de l'amour	TVA	Season 1, 2021: Arielle Salvaje & Benjamin Fabre; Season 2, 2022: Amanda Boily Paleovrahas & Mathieu Dufresne; Season 3, 2023: Lorie Boucher & Hugo Brochu	Naadei Lyonnais (1- 2); Olivier Dion (3)	Mehdi Bousaidan (1–2); Geneviève Schmidt (3)
Croatia; Serbia; Slovenia	Love Island Adria	Voyo; RTL; Pop TV; Prva	Season 1, 2026: Current season	Dragana Mićalović	Saša Lozar; Filip Ugrenović
Czech Republic; Slovakia	Love Island Česko & Slovensko	(Czech Republic) TV Nova; (Slovakia) TV Markíza	Season 1, 2021: Martin Kulhánek & Laura Chrebetová; Season 2, 2022: Denisa Valová & Kryštof Novák; Season 3, 2023: Mária Glatzová & Christopher Jirout; Season 4, 2024: Kristína Víglaská & Michal Trabalík; Season 5, 2025: Honzi Michálek & Patricie Herlíková; Season 6, 2026: Current season	Current; Zorka Hejdová (2-); Former; Nikol Moravcová (1)	Václav Matějovský
Denmark	Love Island	Current; Viaplay (2-); Former; TV3 (1)	Season 1, 2018: Julie Melsen & Oliver Erngart; Season 2, 2025: Dina Mary & Oliver Wollenberg	Current; Carla Mickelborg (2-); Former; Lisbeth Østergaard (1)	Current; TBA (2-); Former; Dan Anderson (1)
Finland	Love Island Suomi	Current; MTV3 (4-); MTV Katsomo (4-); Former; Sub (1-2); AVA (3)	Season 1, 2018: Aura Lampi & Jeffrey Lawman; Season 2, 2019: Eetu Tanskanen & Sofia Näveri; Season 3, 2021: Eeli Ylilehto & Salli Leppäkoski; Season 4, 2023: Elviira Fält & Paulus Pitkälä; Season 5, 2025: Henri Niironen & Julia Matilainen; Season 6, 2026: Ilmari Lehtinen & Jenni Seppä; Season 7, 2027: Upcoming season	Current; Niko Saarinen (5–); Former; Veronica Verho (3–4); Shirly Karvinen (1–2)	Current; Tomi Haustola (4-); Former; Riku Sottinen (1–3)
France	Love Island France	Prime Video France (1); RTL-TVI (1); W9 (2)	Season 1, 2020: Angele Salentino & Tristan Mrs; Season 2, 2023: Cindy Miranda & Edgar Ulrich	Nabilla Benattia (1); Delphine Wespiser (2)	Quentin Thebault (1); Dycosh (2)
Germany	Love Island – Heiße Flirts & wahre Liebe	RTL Zwei	Season 1, 2017: Elena Miras & Jan Sokolowsky; Season 2, 2018: Marcellino "Lino" Kremers & Tracy Candela; Season 3, 2019: Sidney Wolf & Vivien Michalla; Season 4, 2020: Melina Hoch & Tim Kuehnel; Season 5, Spring 2021: Bianca Jule & Paco Harb; Season 6, Fall 2021: Isabell Kremer & Robin Wii; Season 7, 2022: Nico Einfech & Jennifer Iglesias; Season 8, 2023: Jenny Grassl & Luca Müller	Jana Ina (1–5); Sylvie Meis (6–8); Oliver Petszokat (8)	Christoph Kröger (1–2); Simon Beeck (3–8)
Germany	Love Island VIP	RTL Zwei	Season 1, 2024: Chiara Frohlich & Patrick Fabian; Season 2, 2025: Stella Stegmann & Josh Stanley; Season 3, 2026: Upcoming season	Sylvie Meis	Simon Beeck
Greece	Love Island	Skai TV	Season 1, 2022: Argiris Fragkos & Maria Astoglou	Iliana Papageorgiou	Vangelis Giannopoulos
Hungary	Love Island Hungary	RTL Klub	Season 1, 2019: Tícián Lakatos & Zsófia "Zsófi" Németh	Norbert Kamarás (Lajos Bíró)	Ádám Gacsal
Israel	Love Island	Free TV	Season 1, 2024: David Schraer & Kim Vinakor	Eden Fines	TBA
Italy	Love Island Italia	Discovery+	Season 1, 2021: Rebeca Di Filippo & Wolf Yevhen	Giulia De Lellis	
Malta	Love Island Malta	TVM	Season 1, 2023: Allen Piscopo & Chelsea Bagnall-Falzon; Season 2, 2024: Clinton King & Tamika Ross; Season 3, 2025: Evelyn & Matthew Micallef; Season 4, 2026: Anna Paola & Luke Grima	Current; Giselle Spiteri (3-); Former; Yazmin Helledie (1-2)	Chucky Bartolo
Netherlands	Love Island Nederland & België (with Belgium)	Current; Videoland (3–); Streamz (3–); Former; RTL 5 (1–2); VIER (1–2)	Season 1, 2019: Alexandra Jakobczyk & Denzel Slager; Season 2, 2020: Joan Pronk & Mert O'Katann; Season 3, 2022: Cas Hooijer & Jotti Verbruggen; Season 4, 2023: Kengi Meert & Kimmy de Weerd	Holly Mae Brood; Viktor Verhulst	Current; Jeroen Verdick; Sander Lantinga (2-); Former; Kaj van der Ree (1)
Netherlands	Love Island Nederland	Videoland	Season 1, 2019: Daniel van Pienbroek & Floor Masselink; Season 2, 2021: Esmee Cox & Job Stevens	Monica Geuze (1) Holly Mae Brood (2)	Kaj van der Ree (1) Sander Lantinga (2)
New Zealand	Love Island NZ	Three	Season 1, TBA: New Series	TBA	TBA
Nigeria	Love Island Nigeria	ONTV Soundcity Spice	Season 1, TBA: New Series	TBA	TBA
Norway	Love Island Norway	Current; VGTV (5–); Former; TV3 (1); TV 2 (2–4)	Season 1, 2018: Andrea Sveinsdottir & Morten Dalhaug; Season 2, 2020: Johannes Klemp & Nora Haukland; Season 3, 2024: Elisabeth Henriksen Reither & Henrik Fossedal; Season 4, 2025: Camilla De Souza Devik & Nicklas Sundsvåg; Season 5, 2027: Upcoming season	Current; Sophie Elise Isachsen (5–); Former; Tone Damli (1); Morten Hegseth (2); Alexandra Joner (3–4)	Current; TBA (5–); Former; Rasmus Wold (1); Egil Skurdal (2–4)
Poland	Love Island. Wyspa miłości	Current; TV4 (7-); Former; Polsat (1–6)	Season 1, 2019: Mikołaj Jędruszczak & Sylwia Madeńska; Season 2, 2020: Dominik Grot & Julia Nowakowska; Season 3, 2021: Caroline Juchniewicz & Mateusz Zacharczuk; Season 4, 2021: Magdalena Lichota & Wiktor Biernacki; Season 5, 2022: Jakub Galica & Josie Kwaśniewska; Season 6, 2022: Aleksandr Muzheiko & Angelina Zaichenko; Season 7, 2023: Agata Paź & Hubert Wicher; Season 8, 2023: Armin Pawlak & Laura Gołaszewska; Season 9, 2024: Jarek Mrozowski & Zuzanna Maciejewska	Karolina Gilon	Current; Maciej Kasprzyk (2–); Former; Krzysztof Unrug (1)
Romania	Love Island România	Pro TV, Voyo	Season 1, 2023: Adrian Butușină & Anne-Marie Dan	Alina Ceușan	Dragoș Răduță
Spain	Love Island España	Neox	Season 1, 2021: Celia Zanón & Miguel López; Season 2, 2022: Luis Titans & Yaiza Caballot	Cristina Pedroche	
South Africa	Love Island South Africa	M-Net	Season 1, 2021: Libho Geza & Thimna Shooto	Leandie du Randt	
Sweden	Love Island Sweden	TV4	Season 1, 2018: Jacob Olsson & Victoria Eklund Gustafsson; Season 2, 2019: Simon Dannert & Sofia Jenks; Season 3, 2023: Adrian Podde & Celine Axman; Season 4, 2025: Emil Renmarker & Olivia Svensson; Season 5, 2026: Charlie Wågberg & Elin Kihl; Season 6, 2027: Upcoming season	Current; Oscar Zia (6–); Former; Malin Stenbäck (1–2); Julia Franzén (3); Johanna Nordström (4–5)	Current; Torbjörn Averås Skorup (4-); Former
United Kingdom	Celebrity Love Island	ITV	Season 1, 2005: Fran Cosgrave & Jayne Middlemiss; Season 2, 2006: Bianca Gascoigne & Calum Best	Patrick Kielty (1–2); Kelly Brook (1); Fearne Cotton (2)	
United Kingdom	Love Island	ITV2	Season 1, 2015: Jess Hayes & Max Morley; Season 2, 2016: Cara de la Hoyde & Nathan Massey; Season 3, 2017: Amber Davies & Kem Cetinay; Season 4, 2018: Dani Dyer & Jack Fincham; Season 5, 2019: Amber Gill & Greg O'Shea; Season 6, 2020: Finn Tapp & Paige Turley; Season 7, 2021: Millie Court & Liam Reardon; Season 8, 2022: Davide Sanclimenti & Ekin-Su Cülcüloğlu; Season 9, Winter 2023: Kai Fagan & Sanam Harrinanan; Season 10, Summer 2023: Jess Harding & Sammy Root; Season 11, 2024: Josh Oyinsan & Mimii Ngulube; Season 12, 2025: Cach Mercer & Toni Laites; Season 13, 2026: Julia Majchrzak & Lorenzo Alessi	Current; Maya Jama (9–) Former; Caroline Flack (1–5); Laura Whitmore (6–8)	Iain Stirling
United Kingdom	Love Island: All Stars	ITV2	Season 1, 2024: Molly Smith & Tom Clare; Season 2, 2025: Casey O'Gorman & Gabby Allen; Season 3, 2026: Ciaran Davies & Samie Elishi	Maya Jama	Iain Stirling
United States	Love Island USA	Current Peacock (4–) Crave (4–) Former CBS (1–3) CTV (1–3)	Season 1, 2019: Elizabeth Weber & Zac Mirabelli; Season 2, 2020: Caleb Corprew & Justine Ndiba; Season 3, 2021: Korey Gandy & Olivia Kaiser; Season 4, 2022: Timmy Pandolfi & Zeta Morrison; Season 5, 2023: Hannah Wright & Marco Donatelli; Season 6, 2024: Kordell Beckham & Serena Page; Season 7, 2025: Amaya Espinal & Bryan Arenales; Season 8, 2026: Bryce Alakai & Trinity Tatum; Season 9, 2027: Upcoming season	Current; Ariana Madix (6–) Former; Arielle Vandenberg (1–3); Sarah Hyland (4–5)	Current; Iain Stirling (4–) Former; Matthew Hoffman (1–3)
United States	Love Island Games	Peacock	Season 1, 2023: Jack Fowler & Justine Ndiba; Season 2, 2025: Isaiah "Zay" Campbell & Lucinda Strafford; Season 3, 2027: Upcoming season	Current; Ariana Madix (2—); Former; Maya Jama (1)	Iain Stirling

== Popstars ==
Legend: Currently airing Franchise has ceased production Franchise awaiting debut or renewal

Country	Local title	Network	Host(s)	Judges	Seasons, series, winners, and groups formed	Other notable artists
Argentina	Popstars	Azul TV (1); Telefe (2 & 3)			Season 1, 2001: Bandana; Season 2, 2002: Mambrú; Season 3, 2026: TBA	
Australia	Popstars	Seven Network			Season 1, 2000: Bardot; Season 2, 2001: Scandal'us; Season 3, 2002: Scott Cain	
Australia	Popstars Live	Seven Network			Season 1, 2004: Kayne Taylor	Miranda Murphy
Austria	Popstars: Mission Österreich	Puls 4 Website			Season 1, 2011: Kilmokit	Season 1, 2011: BFF
Belgium	Pop Stars	VT4			Season 1, 2001: Vanda Vanda	
Brazil	Popstars	SBT			Season 1, 2002: Rouge; Season 2, 2003: Br'oZ	Season 1: Kênia Boaventura, Janaína Lima, Maíra Charken, Marjorie Estiano and Quelynah; Season 2: Vinícius "D'Black" Cardoso
Canada	Popstars (1); Popstars: Boy Meets Girl (2); Popstars: The One (3)	CTV (1); Global TV (2–3)			Season 1, 2001: Sugar Jones; Season 2, 2002: Velvet Empire; Season 3, 2003: Christa Borden	Julie Crochetière
Colombia	Popstars	Canal Caracol			Season 1, 2002: Escarcha	
Denmark	Popstars (1–3, 5); Popstars Showtime! (4)	TV 2 (1–4); Kanal 5 (5)			Season 1, 2001: EyeQ; Season 2, 2002: Jon Nørgaard; Season 3, 2003: Fu:el; Season 4, 2004: Maria Lucia; Season 5, 2014: Linnea	Season 2: Julie Berthelsen and Christine Milton; Season 3: Emil Thorup
Ecuador	Popstars	Teleamazonas			Season 1, 2003: Kiruba; Season 2, 2004: La Coba	
Finland	Popstars	MTV3			Season 1, 2002: Gimmel, Paula Vesala, Mira Luoti; Season 2, 2004: INDX	Season 1: Jenni Vartiainen; Season 2: Jane
France	Popstars (1–2, 4–6); Popstars – le duel (3)	M6 (1–4); D8 (5); Amazon Prime Video (6)			Season 1, 2001: L5; Season 2, 2002: Whatfor; Season 3, 2003: Linkup; Season 4, 2007: Sheryfa Luna; Season 5, 2013: The Mess; Season 6, 2024: SOR4	Season 1: Louisy Joseph; Season 2: Chimène Badi; Season 3: Diadems and M. Pokora; Season 4: Léa Castel, Slimane; Season 5: Sindy Auvity
Germany	Popstars	RTL II (1–2, 11); ProSieben (3–10)			Season 1, 2000–01: No Angels; Season 2, 2001: Bro'Sis; Season 3, 2003: Overground; Season 4, 2004: Nu Pagadi; Season 5, 2006: Monrose; Season 6, 2007: Room 2012; Season 7, 2008: Queensberry; Season 8, 2009: Some & Any; Season 9, 2010: LaViVe; Season 10, 2012: Melouria; Season 11, 2015: Leandah	Season 2: Yasmin K. Season 3: Preluders; Season 5: Bisou
Greece	Popstars	Mega TV			Season 1, 2003: Hi-5	
Hungary	Popsztárok	TV2			Season 1, 2002: Sugar & Spice	
India	Coke [V] Popstars	Channel V			Season 1, 2002: Viva; Season 2, 2003: Aasma	
Indonesia	Popstars Indonesia	Trans TV			Season 1, 2003: Sparx	
Ireland	Irish Popstars	RTÉ One			Season 1, 2002: Six	Nadine Coyle
Italy	Popstar (1); Superstar Tour (2)	Italia 1			Season 1, 2001: Lollipop; Season 2, 2003: Lucky Star	Season 1: Valentina Monetta
Kenya	Coca-Cola Popstars					Season 1, 2004: Sema (Kenya)
Malaysia	Popstars	ntv7			Season 1, 2003: By'U	
Mexico	Popstars	Televisa			Season 1, 2002: T' de Tila	María León (Playa Limbo); Ana Brenda Contreras
Netherlands	Popstars: The Rivals	RTL 4			Season 1, 2004: Men2B (boys), Raffish (girls)	
Netherlands	Popstars	SBS6			Season 1, 2008: RED! Season 2, 2009–10: Wesley Klein; Season 3, 2010–11: Dean Saunders	
New Zealand	Popstars	TVNZ 2			Season 1, 1999: TrueBliss; Season 2, 2021: Christabel Williams; Season 3, TBA: Renewal pending	
Norway	Popstars	TV3			Season 1, 2001: Cape	
Portugal	Popstars	SIC			Season 1, 2001: Nonstop	Gémeas
Romania	Popstars România	Pro TV			Season 1, 2003: Cocktail	Bliss
Russia	Стань звездой (Stan zvezdoy)	Telekanal Rossiya			Season 1, 2002: Drugie Pravila (Другие правила; lit. Other rules)	
Slovakia	Coca-Cola Popstar	Markíza			Season 1, 2001: Seven Days to Winter; Season 2, 2002: Misha; Season 3, 2003: Zuzana Smatanová; Season 4, 2004: Vetroplach; Season 5, 2005: Bystrík; Season 6, 2006: Ivo Bič; Season 7, 2007: Peoples; Season 8, 2008: Mária Čírová	
Slovenia	Popstars	Kanal A			Season 1, 2002: Bepop; Season 2, 2003: Unique	Season 2: B.B.T. and Hajdi Korošec
South Africa	Popstars	SABC 3 (1); SABC 1 (2-3) e.tv (4)			Season 1, 2002: 101; Season 2, 2003: Adilah; Season 3 2004: Jamali and Ghetto Lingo; Season 4, 2010: Nne Vida	Season 1: Afro Z
Spain	Popstars: Todo por un sueño	Telecinco			Season 1, 2002: Bellepop	Jesús Vázquez
Sweden	Popstars	Kanal 5			Season 1, 2001: Excellence; Season 2, 2002: Supernatural; Season 3, 2003: Johannes Kotschy	Season 2: Martin Rolinski
Switzerland	Popstars	TV3			Season 1, 2001: Tears	
Tanzania	Coca-Cola Popstars				Season 1, 2004: Wakilisha	
Turkey	Popstars	Kanal D (1); Show TV (2); Star TV (3)			Season 1, 2003: Adibin Özşahin; Season 2, 2004: Selçuk Demirelli; Season 3, 2006: Metin Levent	
Uganda	Coca-Cola Popstars				Season 1, 2004: Blu3	
Ukraine	Суперзірка (Superstar)	1+1			Season 1, 2010: Viktoriya Korzheniuk	
United Kingdom	Popstars (1); Popstars: The Rivals (2)	ITV			Season 1, 2001: Hear'Say; Season 2, 2002: Girls Aloud	Season 1: Liberty X (finalists), Darius Danesh, Warren Stacey; Season 2: One True Voice, Javine Hylton, Clea, Phixx, The Cheeky Girls, Hazel Kaneswaran
United States	Popstars USA	The WB			Season 1, Early 2001: Eden's Crush; Season 2, Late 2001: Scene 23	Season 1: Nicole Scherzinger, Nikki McKibbin; Season 2: Josh Henderson

== Project Runway ==
Countries highlighted in red indicate a version of the show that is no longer airing.

Country	Name	Host	Channel	First Premiere	Regular Judge	Seasons	Winners
Algeria	Project Runway Algeria	Maroua Bekkouche	Echorouk TV	November 4, 2023	Karim Akrouf; Meriem Abdellatif; Rayan Atlas (mentor)	2	Season 1, 2023: Amine Smati; Season 2, 2024: Sakina Laidi
(Arab League) Arab World	Project Fashion: El Musamim El Arabi	Norma Naoum	Future TV	February 26, 2006	Norma Naoum; Maria Aziz; Rabih Keyrouz (mentor)	2	Season 1, 2006: Julien Abboud; Season 2, 2007: Mohammed Ashi
(Arab League) Arab World	Project Runway Middle East	Jessica Kahawaty (Season 1); Valerie Abou Chacra (Season 2)	MBC 1	September 17, 2016	Elie Saab; Afef Jnifen; Faris Al Shehri (mentor)		Season 1, 2016: Alaa Najd; Season 2, 2017: Saher Okal
Australia	Project Runway Australia	Kristy Hinze (Season 1–2); Megan Gale (Season 3–4)	Arena	Season 1: July 7, 2008 – September 15, 2008; Season 2: July 8, 2009 – September 16, 2009; Season 3: July 4, 2011 – September 12, 2011; Season 4: October 8, 2012 – December 17, 2012	Jarrad Clark; Kirrily Johnston; Alex Perry (mentor)	4	Season 1, 2008: Juli Grbac; Season 2, 2009: Anthony Capon; Season 3, 2011: Dylan Cooper; Season 4, 2012: Christina Exie
Belgium	De Designers	Evi Hanssen	VTM	December 16, 2008	Christophe Coppens; Veerle Windels; Ann Claes; Erik Verdonck (mentor)	2	Season 1, 2008–2009: An Buermans; Season 2, 2009–2010: Gianni Lapage
Brazil	Projeto Fashion	Adriane Galisteu	Band	September 17, 2011	Susana Barbosa; Reinaldo Lourenço; Alexandre Herchcovitch (mentor)	1	Season 1, 2011: Cynthia Hayashi
Canada	Project Runway Canada	Iman (Season 1–2); Coco Rocha (Season 3)	Slice; Global	October 8, 2007	Jeanne Beker (judge season 3); Spencer Badu (judge season 3); Shawn Hewson (judge season 1–2); Rita Silvan (judge season 1–2); Aurora James (mentor season 3); Brian Bailey (mentor season 1–2)	3	Season 1, 2007: Evan Biddell; Season 2, 2009: Sunny Fong; Season 3, 2025-2026: Leeland Mitchell
Finland	Muodin huipulle	Minna Cheung (season 1); Nora Vilva (season 2)	MTV3	November 1, 2009	Minna Cheung (Season 1); Nora Vilva (Season 2); Anssi Tuupainen (Season 1); Jaakko Selin (mentor season 1, judge season 2); Janne Renvall (mentor season 2)	2	Season 1, 2009: Katri Niskanen; Season 2, 2011: Linda Sipilä; Season 3, 2023: Pali Albin; Season 4, 2024: Miro Hämäläinen
France	Projet Fashion	Hapsatou Sy	D8	March 3, 2015	Catherine Baba; Roland Mouret; Alexandra Senes; Donald Potard (mentor)	1	Season 1, 2015: Pierre-Henry Bor
Greece	Project Runway	Evangelia Aravani	Open TV	October 25, 2018	Roula Revi; Dimitris Petrou; Mihalis Pantos; Apostolos Mitropoulos (mentor)	1	Season 1, 2018–2019: Margarita Priftaki
Israel	פרויקט מסלול; Proyekt Maslul	Shiraz Tal	Channel 2 (Reshet)	June 17, 2009 – October 2009	Vivi Bleish; Gal Afel; Sason Kedem (mentor)	1	Season 1, 2008–2009: Alon Livne
Italy	Project Runway Italia	Eva Herzigová	Fox Life	February 26, 2014 – April 30, 2014	Alberta Ferretti; Tomaso Trussardi; Ildo Damiano (mentor)	1	Season 1, 2014: Marco Taranto
Jamaica	Mission Catwalk	Keneea Linton-George	TVJ	March 15, 2011	Keneea Linton-George (mentor season 2, hostess and judge seasons 1–3); Novia McDonald-Whyte; Carlton Brown; Sandra Kennedy (mentor Season 1); Kay Davitian (mentor)	7	Season 1, 2011: Shenna Carby; Season 2, 2012: Gregory Williams; Season 3, 2013: Theodore Elyett; Season 4, 2014: Kurt Campbell; Season 5, 2015: David Rolle; Season 6, 2018: Rochele Spencer; Season 7, 2023: Aaron Moneer
Latin America	Project Runway Latin America	Rebecca de Alba (season 1 & 2); Eglantina Zingg (season 3)	Fashion TV (season 1), Glitz* (season 2 & 3)	September 20, 2010	Claudia Pandolfo (season 1–2); Ariadne Grant (season 3); Ángel Sánchez; Mariano Toledo (mentor in season 1–2) Jorge Duque Velez (mentor season 3)	3	Season 1, 2010: Jorge Duque Velez; Season 2, 2011: Karyn Coo; Season 3, 2013: Matias Hernan
Mongolia	Project Runway Mongolia	Tserendolgor Battsengel	Star TV	October 2, 2022	Michel Choigaalaa; Ovdogmid Delgerdalai; Zorig Tumennasan; Khuslen Ganhuu (mentor)	1	Season 1, 2022: Enkhbazar E.
Malaysia	Project Runway Malaysia	Bernie Chan	8TV	August 3, 2007	Bernie Chan; Datuk Bernard Chandran	1	Season 1, 2007: Felix Chin
Netherlands	Project Catwalk	Renate Verbaan (season 1 & 2); Stacey Rookhuizen (season 3)	RTL 5	October 8, 2007	Simone Dernee (season 1); Cecile Narinx (season 2); Daryl van Wouw (season 1 & 2); Olcay Gulsen (season 3); Jan Taminiau (season 3)	3	Season 1, 2007: Django Steenbakker
New Zealand	Project Runway New Zealand	Georgia Fowler	TVNZ 2	October 1, 2018 – December 17, 2018	Benny Castles; Sally-Ann Mullin; Andreas Mikellis (mentor)	1	Season 1, 2018: Benjamin Alexander
Norway	Designerspirene	Vendela Kirsebom	TV3	February 26, 2007 – May 2007	Vendela Kirsebom; Peter Løchstøer; Petra Middelthon; William Jensen (mentor)	1	Season 1, 2005–2006: Daniel Sørensen
Philippines	Project Runway Philippines	Teresa Herrera (2008–2009); Tweetie De Leon (2011–2015)	ETC; SBN 21	Season 1: July 30, 2008 – November 12, 2008; Season 2: August 12, 2009 – December 2, 2009; Season 3: March 25, 2012 – May 13, 2012; Season 4: June 14, 2015 – August 2015	Apples Aberin-Sahdwani; Rajo Laurel; Jojie Lloren (mentor)	4	Season 1, 2008: Aries Lagat; Season 2, 2009: Manny Marquez; Season 3, 2012: Milka Quin Redoble; Season 4, 2015: Jose Joy Chicano
Poland	Project Runway	Anja Rubik	TVN	March 2, 2014	Anja Rubik; Joanna Przetakiewicz; Marcin Tyszka (season 2); Mariusz Przybylski (season 1); Tomasz Ossoliński (mentor)	2	Season 1, 2014: Jakub "Jacob" Bartnik; Season 2, 2015: Michał Zieliński
Portugal	Projecto Moda	Nayma Mingas	RTP1	July 25, 2010 – September 26, 2010	Manuel Alves; Fátima Cotta; Cristina Pinho; Paulo Gomes (mentor)	1	Season 1, 2010: Carina Duarte
Russia	Проект Подиум; Project Runway Russia	Anna Sedokova (season 1); Maria Minogarova (season 2)	MTV Russia (season 1); Friday! (season 2)	Season 1: October 8, 2011; season 2: October 18, 2018	Elena Sotnikova (season 1); Leonid Alexeyev (season 1); Pavel Kaplevich (mentor; season 1); Valentin Yudashkin (season 2); Tim Ilyasov (mentor; season 2)	2	Season 1, 2011–2012: Dmitry Neu; Season 2, 2018: Elizaveta Kostyukova
South Africa	Project Runway South Africa	Lerato Kganyago	Mzansi Magic	August 17, 2018	Noni Gasa; Rahim Rawjee; Gert-Johan Coetzee (mentor)	1	Season 1, 2018: Kentse Masilo
South Korea	프로젝트 런웨이 코리아; Project Runway Korea	Lee So-ra	Onstyle	February 7, 2009	Shin Yoo-jin; Kim Seok-won; Kan Ho-sup (mentor)	5	Season 1, 2009: Lee Woo-kyung; Season 2, 2010: Jung Go-woun; Season 3, 2011: Shin Joo-yeon; Season 4, 2012: Kim Hye-ran; All-Stars 1, 2015: Hwang Jae-geun
Sweden	Project Runway Sverige	Sofi Fahrman	TV3	October 1, 2012	Rossana Mariano; Marcel Marongiu; Rohdi Heintz (mentor)	1	Season 1, 2012: Naim Josefi
Thailand	Project Runway Thailand	Anne Jakrajutatip	JKN 18	May 7, 2022	Ek Thongprasert; Kwankao Svetavimala; Guest star; Tawn Chatchawanwong (mentor)	1	Season 1, 2022: Folk Apisit Permlab
Turkey	Proje Moda	Güzide Duran	Star TV	July 9, 2007	Cemil İpekçi; Işın Görmüş; Barbarossa	1	Season 1, 2007: Selim Baklacı
Ukraine	Подіум; Podium	Nataliya Gotsiy	Novyi Kanal	February 20, 2019	Olha Slon; Ivan Suprun; Lilya Liykovska; Jean Gritsfeldt (mentor)	1	Season 1, 2019: Maria Dzyubenko & Maksim Sereda (Duet Sereda)
United Kingdom	Project Catwalk	Elizabeth Hurley (2006); Kelly Osbourne (2007–2008)	Sky One	2006–2008	Julien Macdonald; Lorraine Candy (2006); Paula Reed (2007–2008); Ben de Lisi (mentor)	3	Season 1, 2006: Kirsty Doyle; Season 2, 2007: Wayne Aveline; Season 3, 2008: Jasper Garvida
Vietnam	Project Runway Vietnam	Ngô Thanh Vân (2013); Trương Ngọc Ánh (2014–2015)	VTV3	Season 1: April 28 – June 16, 2013; Season 2 : May 11, 2013 – July 6, 2014; Season 3 : December 19, 2015 – January 30, 2016	Đỗ Mạnh Cường (2013); Chloe Dao (2013); Trần Nguyễn Thiên Hương (2013–2016); Nguyễn Công Trí (2014–2016); Nguyễn Thanh Tùng (mentor)	3	Season 1, 2013: Hoàng Minh Hà; Season 2, 2014: Lý Giám Tiền; Season 3, 2015–2016: Nguyễn Tiến Truyển

== Reality Circus ==
Currently airing franchise
Franchise no longer in production

Region/Country	Local name	Network	Main presenter	Date premiered
Argentina	El Circo De Las Estrellas	Telefe	Susana Giménez	26 March 2007
Belarus	Звездный цирк Zvezdnyi tsirk	ONT		20 January 2007
Brazil	Circo do Faustão	Rede Globo	Fausto Silva	8 July 2007
Chile	Circo de estrellas	TVN	Rafael Araneda	25 March 2010
India	Comedy Circus	Sony TV	Shruti Seth	16 June 2007
Italy	Reality Circus	Canale 5	Barbara D'Urso	17 September 2006
Mexico	Los 5 Magníficos	Televisa	Marco Antonio Regil	15 April 2007
Portugal	Circo das Celebridades	TVI	Júlia Pinheiro	19 March 2006
Poland	Gwiezdny Cyrk	Polsat	Zygmunt Chajzer and Agnieszka Popielewicz	6 March 2008
Russia	Цирк со звёздами Tsirk so zvezdami	1TV	Ivan Urgant and Sasha Volkovskaya	4 March 2007
Spain	Circus: Más dificil todavía	Cuatro	Josep Lobató	15 September 2008
Turkey	Ünlüler Sirki	Star TV	Süheyl Uygur	2007
United Kingdom	Cirque de Celebrité	Sky One	Ruby Wax (2006), Jenni Falconer (2007)	15 October 2006
United States	Celebrity Circus	NBC	Joey Fatone	11 June 2008

== Drag Race ==
Legend
†	Currently airing season
#	Franchise no longer in production
‡	Upcoming season announced
⁂	Status of season/franchise unknown

Country/Region	Name	Network	Premiere	Judges	Winner(s)
Australia New Zealand	Drag Race Down Under⁂	Current; Stan (s. 1–); Former; TVNZ 2/TVNZ+ (s. 1-3)	May 1, 2021	Current: Michelle Visage; Rhys Nicholson; Kita Mean (s. 4–); Spankie Jackzon (s. 4–); Isis Avis Loren (s. 4–); Former: RuPaul (s. 1–3)	Season 1, 2021: Kita Mean; Season 2, 2022: Spankie Jackzon; Season 3, 2023: Isis Avis Loren; Season 4, 2024: Lazy Susan
Belgium	Drag Race Belgique⁂	Tipik	February 16, 2023	Current: Rita Baga; Mustii; Lio (s. 2–); Former: Lufy (s. 1)	Season 1, 2023: Drag Couenne; Season 2, 2024: Alvilda
Brazil	Drag Race Brasil⁂	Current; WOWPresents+ (s. 2–); Former; MTV (s. 1); Paramount+ (s. 1)	August 30, 2023	Grag Queen; Bruna Braga; Dudu Bertholini	Season 1, 2023: Organzza; Season 2, 2025: Ruby Nox
Canada	Canada's Drag Race‡	Crave	July 2, 2020	Current: Brooke Lynn Hytes; Traci Melchor (s. 2–); Carson Kressley (s. 6–); Hollywood Jade (s. 6–); Sarain Fox (s. 6–); Former: Jeffrey Bowyer-Chapman (s. 1); Stacey McKenzie (s. 1); Amanda Brugel (s. 2); Brad Goreski (s. 2–5)	Season 1, 2020: Priyanka; Season 2, 2021: Icesis Couture; Season 3, 2022: Gisèle Lullaby; Season 4, 2023–2024: Venus; Season 5, 2024–2025: The Virgo Queen; Season 6, 2025–2026: Van Goth; Season 7, 2026–2027: TBA; Season 8: TBA
Chile	The Switch Drag Race#	Mega	October 8, 2015	Nicole Gaultier; Íngrid Cruz; Juan Pablo González (s. 1); Sebastián Errázuriz (s. 1); Oscar Mediavilla (s. 2)	Season 1, 2015–2016: Luz Violeta; Season 2, 2018: Miss Leona
France	Drag Race France‡	Current; France 2 (s. 1–); Former; France.tv Slash (s. 1–2)	June 25, 2022	Current: Nicky Doll; Daphné Bürki; Loïc Prigent (s. 4–); Anggun (s. 4–); Former: Kiddy Smile (s. 1–3)	Season 1, 2022: Paloma; Season 2, 2023: Keiona; Season 3, 2024: Le Filip; Season 4, 2026: Lana Cotta; Season 5: TBA
Germany Austria Switzerland	Drag Race Germany⁂	MTV; Paramount+	September 5, 2023	Barbie Breakout; Gianni Jovanovic; Dianne Brill	Season 1, 2023: Pandora Nox
Italy	Drag Race Italia⁂	Current; MTV (s. 3–); Paramount+ (s. 3–); Former; Discovery+ (s. 1–2); Real Time (s. 1–2)	November 18, 2021	Current: Priscilla; Chiara Francini; Paola Iezzi (s. 3–); Paolo Camilli (s. 3–); Former: Tommaso Zorzi (s. 1–2)	Season 1, 2021: Elecktra Bionic; Season 2, 2022: La Diamond; Season 3, 2023: Lina Galore
Mexico	Drag Race México‡	Current; WOWPresents+ (s. 2–); Former; MTV (s. 1); Paramount+ (s. 1)	June 22, 2023	Current: Lolita Banana; Óscar Madrazo; Taiga Brava (s. 2–); Former: Valentina (s. 1)	Season 1, 2023: Cristian Peralta; Season 2, 2024: Leexa Fox; Season 3: TBA
Netherlands	Drag Race Holland⁂	Videoland	September 18, 2020	Fred van Leer; Nikkie Plessen (s. 1); Marieke Samallo (s. 2)	Season 1, 2020: Envy Peru; Season 2, 2021: Vanessa Van Cartier
Philippines	Drag Race Philippines†	Current; WOWPresents+ (s. 4–); Former; HBO Go (s. 1–3); Discovery+ (s. 1)	August 17, 2022	Current: Paolo Ballesteros; KaladKaren; BJ Pascual; Jon Santos; Rajo Laurel; Former: Jiggly Caliente (s. 1-3)	Season 1, 2022: Precious Paula Nicole; Season 2, 2023: Captivating Katkat; Season 3, 2024: Maxie; Season 4, 2026: TBA
South Africa	Drag Race South Africa‡	TBA	TBA	TBA	Season 1: TBA
Spain	Drag Race España†	Atresplayer Premium	May 30, 2021	Supremme de Luxe; Ana Locking; Javier Ambrossi; Javier Calvo	Season 1, 2021: Carmen Farala; Season 2, 2022: Sharonne; Season 3, 2023: Pitita; Season 4, 2024: Le Cocó; Season 5, 2025: Satín Greco; Season 6, 2026: TBA
Sweden	Drag Race Sverige⁂	SVT1; SVT Play	March 4, 2023	Robert Fux; Kayo; Farao Groth	Season 1, 2023: Admira Thunderpussy
Thailand	Drag Race Thailand⁂	Current; WOWPresents+ (s. 3–); Former; Line TV (s. 1–2)	February 15, 2018	Pangina Heals; Art Arya; Gus Setthachai (s. 3–); Metinee Kingpayome (s. 3–); Niti Chaichitathorn (s. 3–)	Season 1, 2018: Natalia Pliacam; Season 2, 2019: Angele Anang; Season 3, 2024: Frankie Wonga
United Kingdom	RuPaul's Drag Race UK⁂	Former; BBC Three (s. 1–3); BBC One (s. 1–3); BBC Three (s. 4–8)	October 3, 2019	RuPaul; Michelle Visage; Alan Carr; Graham Norton	Series 1, 2019: The Vivienne; Series 2, 2021: Lawrence Chaney; Series 3, 2021: Krystal Versace; Series 4, 2022: Danny Beard; Series 5, 2023: Ginger Johnson; Series 6, 2024: Kyran Thrax; Series 7, 2025: Bones; Series 8, 2026: Flesh
United States	RuPaul's Drag Race‡	Current; MTV (s. 15–); Former; Logo TV (s. 1–8); VH1 (s. 9–14)	February 2, 2009	Current: RuPaul; Michelle Visage (s. 3–); Carson Kressley (s. 7–); Ross Mathews (s. 7–); Ts Madison (s. 15–); Law Roach (s. 17–); Former: Merle Ginsberg (s. 1–2); Santino Rice (s. 1–6); Billy B (s. 3–4)	Season 1, 2009: BeBe Zahara Benet; Season 2, 2010: Tyra Sanchez; Season 3, 2011: Raja; Season 4, 2012: Sharon Needles; Season 5, 2013: Jinkx Monsoon; Season 6, 2014: Bianca Del Rio; Season 7, 2015: Violet Chachki; Season 8, 2016: Bob the Drag Queen; Season 9, 2017: Sasha Velour; Season 10, 2018: Aquaria; Season 11, 2019: Yvie Oddly; Season 12, 2020: Jaida Essence Hall; Season 13, 2021: Symone; Season 14, 2022: Willow Pill; Season 15, 2023: Sasha Colby; Season 16, 2024: Nymphia Wind; Season 17, 2025: Onya Nurve; Season 18, 2026: Myki Meeks; Season 19: TBA; Season 20: TBA

== Single Moms ==
Country	Title	Network	First Aired
Sweden	Ensam mamma söker	TV3	2007
Finland	Sinkkuäidille sulhanen	Nelonen	2007
Netherlands	Alleen nog een man	Net 5	2008
Denmark	En mand til mor	TV3	2008
Norway	Mamma søker kjæreste	TV3	2008
Poland	Mamy Mamy	TVP1	2008
France	Maman cherche l’amour	M6	2008
Germany	Papa gesucht	RTL	2009
Romania	Mame Singure	Kanal D	2008

== Star Academy ==
Franchise with a currently airing season
Franchise awaiting confirmation
Franchise with an unknown status
Franchise with an upcoming season
Franchise no longer in production

Region	Local name	Channel	Winner	Main Presenters
African; Countries	Project Fame; Website	M-Net; DStv (Live); The Africa Channel (Broadcast in 2008)	Season 1, 2004: Lindiwe Alam	James Alexander; Vusi Twala
Arab Maghreb	Star Academy Maghreb; Website	Nessma TV	Season 1, 2007: Hajar Adnane	Nabila El Kilani
(Arab League) Arab world	Star Academy Arabia; Website; Website; Website	LBCI; CBC (starting season 9)	Season 1, 2003–2004: Mohamed Attia; Season 2, 2004–2005: Hisham Abdulrahman; Season 3, 2005–2006: Joseph Attieh; Season 4, 2006–2007: Shatha Hassoun; Season 5, 2008: Nader Guirat; Season 6, 2009: Abdulaziz Abdulrahman; Season 7, 2010: Nassif Zeytoun; Season 8, 2011: Nessma Alaa Mahgoub; Season 9, 2013–2014: Mahmoud Mohey; Season 10, 2014: Mohamed Chahine; Season 11, 2015–2016: Marwan Youssef	Hilda Khalife
Argentina	Operación Triunfo; Website; Website; Website	Telefe; Canal 4 DirecTV (Live) (Season 4)	Season 1, 2003: Claudio Basso; Season 2, 2004–2005: José García; Season 3, 2005–2006: Benjamín Rosales; Season 4, 2009: Cristian Manuel Soloa; Season 5, 2012–2013: F.A.N.S.	Alejandro Wiebe, "Marley" (Season 1–4); Germán Paoloski (Season 5)
Belgium	Star Academy (Dutch); Website; Website	Kanaal Twee	Season 1, 2005: Katerine Avgoustakis	Walter Grootaers
Belgium	Star Academy (French); Website	RTL-TVI	Season 1, 2002: Mélanie Martin's	Virginie Efira & Frédéric Hebrays
Bolivia	La Fábrica de Estrellas - Star Academy; Website	Red Unitel	Season 1, 2016: David Soliz; Season 2, 2016: Vania Taborga	Anabel Angus; Angélica Mérida
Brazil	Fama; Website; Website	Rede Globo; SKY (Live)	Season 1, 2002: Vanessa Jackson; Season 2, 2003: Marcus Vinícius; Season 3, 2004: Tiago Silva; Season 4, 2005: Fabio Souza	Angélica Ksyvickis (Season 1–4); Toni Garrido (Season 1-2)
Bulgaria	Star Academy; Website	Nova Television; Nova+ (Live); CableTel (Live)	Season 1, 2005: Marin Yonchev	Maria Ilieva
Canada	Star Académie; Website	TVA	Season 1, 2003: Wilfred Le Bouthillier; Season 2, 2004: Stéphanie Lapointe; Season 3, 2005: Marc-André Fortin; Season 4, 2009: Maxime Landry; Season 5, 2012: Jean-Marc Couture; Season 6, 2021: William Cloutier; Season 7, 2022: Krystel Mongeau; Season 8, 2025: Mia Tinayre	Julie Snyder (Season 1–5); Patrice Michaud (Season 6); Marc Dupré (Season 7); Jean-Philippe Dion (Season 8)
Chile	Operación Triunfo; Website	Mega	Season 1, 2003: Mónica Rodríguez	Álvaro Escobar
East Africa	Tusker Project Fame; Website; Website	M-Net (Africa) (Season 1); NTV (Season 1); Citizen TV (Season 2–5); RTNB (Season 5); Channel 10 (Season 1); StarTV (Season 2–3, 5) TBC (Season 4); UBC (Season 1, 4); WBS (Season 2–3); NTV (Season 5); Rwanda TV (Season 3–5); SSTV (Season 4); Channel 146 (Season 5)	Season 1, 2006: Valerie Kimani; Season 2, 2008: Esther Nabaasa Mugizi; Season 3, 2009: Alpha Rwirangira; Season 4, 2010: Davis Hillary Ntare; Season 5, 2012: Ruth Matete	Gaetano Kagwa (Season 1); Fumnilayo Raimi (Season 2); Mich Egwang (Season 3–5); Sheila Mwanyigah (Season 3–5)
East Africa	Tusker All-Stars (All-Stars Format)	M-Net (Africa) (Season 1); NTV (Season 1); Citizen TV (Season 2–5); RTNB (Season 5); Channel 10 (Season 1); StarTV (Season 2–3, 5) TBC (Season 4); UBC (Season 1, 4); WBS (Season 2–3); NTV (Season 5); Rwanda TV (Season 3–5); SSTV (Season 4); Channel 146 (Season 5)	Season 1, 2011: Davis Ntare, Peter Msechu & Alpha Rwirangira	Gaetano Kagwa; Eve D'Souza
France	Star Academy; Website; Website; Website	TF1 (Season 1–8, 10-); NRJ 12 (Season 9)	Season 1, 2001–2002: Jenifer Bartoli; Season 2, 2002: Nolwenn Leroy; Season 3, 2003: Élodie Frégé; Season 4, 2004: Grégory Lemarchal; Season 5, 2005: Magalie Vaé; Season 6, 2006: Cyril Cinélu; Season 7, 2007–2008: Quentin Mosimann; Season 8, 2008: Mickels Réa; Season 9, 2012–2013: Laurène Bourvon; Season 10, 2022: Anisha Jo; Season 11, 2023–2024: Pierre Garnier; Season 12, 2024–2025: Marine Delplace; Season 13, 2025–2026: Ambre Berger; Season 14, 2026: Current season	Nikos Aliagas (Season 1–8, 10-); Karima Charni (Season 10-); Mathieu Delormeau (Season 9); Tonya Kinzinger (Season 9)
Georgia	ვარსკვლავების აკადემია Varskvlavebis Akademia; Website	Rustavi 2	Season 1, 2008: Dito Lagvilava; Season 2, 2009: Cancelled	Sopho Khalvashi; Giorgi Qorqia
Germany	Fame Academy; Website	RTL II; Tele 5 MTV2 Pop	Season 1, 2003–2004: Become One	Nova Meierhenrich
Greece / Cyprus	Fame Story; Website	ANT1	Season 1, 2002: Notis Christodoulou; Season 2, 2004: Kalomira; Season 3, 2004–2005: Pericles Stergianoudes; Season 4, 2006: Leonidas Balafas	Natalia Germanou (1); Andreas Mikroutsikos (2); Tatiana Stefanidou (3); Sophia Aliberti (4)
Greece / Cyprus	Fame Story; Website	Star Channel (Cyprus) Omega TV	Season 5, 2023: Anna Poltzoglou	Nikos Koklonis
Greece / Cyprus	Star Academy - Super Star Academy; Website	Epsilon TV; Plus Channel Cyprus	Season 1, 2017: Christina Ksirokosta	Menios Fourthiotis
Hungary	Star Academy Magyaroszág; Website	TV2	Season 1, 2016: Renáta Szőcs	Majka; Nóra Ördög
India	Fame Gurukul; Website	SET India	Season 1, 2005: Qazi Touqeer & Ruprekha Banerjee	Mandira Bedi (Season 1-Celebrity); Manav Gohil (Season 1-Celebrity); Sophie Choudry (Season 2); Shilpa Sakhlani (Season 2)
India	Celebrity Fame Gurukul (Celebrity Format); Website	SET India	Season 1, 2005: Amit Sareen	Mandira Bedi (Season 1-Celebrity); Manav Gohil (Season 1-Celebrity); Sophie Choudry (Season 2); Shilpa Sakhlani (Season 2)
India	Fame X Chal Udiye; Website	SAB TV	Season 2, 2006–2007: Rehan Khan	Mandira Bedi (Season 1-Celebrity); Manav Gohil (Season 1-Celebrity); Sophie Choudry (Season 2); Shilpa Sakhlani (Season 2)
Israel	סטאר אקדמי	Reshet 13	Season 1, 2025–2026: Upcoming season	Noa Kirel
Italy	Operazione Trionfo; Website	Italia 1	Season 1, 2002: Bruno Cuomo	Miguel Bosé
Italy	Star Academy; Website	Rai 2	Season 1, 2011: Cancelled	Francesco Facchinetti
Kazakhstan	Жұлдыздар фабрикасы Juldizdar Fabrikasi; Website	TV7	Season 1, 2011: Alisher Egemberdiev	Adil Liyan; Taya Katyusha
Mexico	Operación Triunfo; Website	Televisa (Live)	Season 1, 2002: Darina Márquez	Jaime Camil
Mongolia	Оддын академи Oddin akademi	Edutainment TV	Season 1, 2017: The Wasabies	Batbileg Batts; Dashdavaa Amartuvshin
Netherlands	Starmaker; Website	Yorin	Season 1, 2001: K-otic	Gijs Staverman
Netherlands	Star Academy; Website	Yorin	Season 2, 2002: Cancelled	Danny Rook
Peru	Operación Triunfo; Website	América Televisión	Season 1, 2012: Mayra Alejandra Goñi	Gisela Valcárcel
Philippines	Pinoy Dream Academy; Website	ABS-CBN; Studio 23	Season 1, 2006: Yeng Constantino; Season 2, 2008: Laarni Lozada	Nikki Gil (Season 1–2); Toni Gonzaga (Season 1–2); Bianca Gonzalez (Season 1); Sam Milby (Season 1); Roxanne Barcelo (Season 1); Billy Crawford (Season 2)
Philippines	Pinoy Dream Academy: Little Dreamers (Kids Format)	ABS-CBN; Studio 23	Season 1, 2008: Philip Nolasco	Nikki Gil (Season 1–2); Toni Gonzaga (Season 1–2); Bianca Gonzalez (Season 1); Sam Milby (Season 1); Roxanne Barcelo (Season 1); Billy Crawford (Season 2)
Poland	Fabryka Gwiazd; Website	Polsat	Season 1, 2008: Martyna Melosik	Maciej Rock
Portugal	Academia de Estrelas; Website; Website	TVI	Season 1, 2002–03: Mané Crestejo	Teresa Guilherme
Portugal	Academia de Famosos (Celebrity Format); Website; Website	TVI	Season 1, 2003: Romana	Paulo Pires; Fernanda Serrano
Portugal	Operação Triunfo; Website; Website; Website	RTP	Season 1, 2003: Sofia Barbosa; Season 2, 2003–04: Sofia Vitória; Season 3, 2007–08: Vânia Fernandes; Season 4, 2010–11: Jorge Roque	Catarina Furtado (Seasons 1–2); Sílvia Alberto (Seasons 3–4)
Romania Moldova	Star Factory România; Website	Prima TV	Season 1, 2003–2004: Alex Velea	Laura Iordache; Virgil Ianțu
Romania Moldova	Fabrica de staruri Website; Website	Prime TV; 2 Plus; TVR 1 (Season 3)	Season 1, 2008–2009: Alexandru Manciu; Season 2, 2010: Alexandru Belenki; Season 3, 2012: Alexandru Mațaev	Andreea Raicu (Season 1); Dan Negru (Season 2); Marius Vizante (Season 3)
Russia	Фабрика звёзд Fabrika zvyozd Website	Channel One	Season 1, 2002: Pasha Artemyev; Season 2, 2003: Polina Gagarina; Season 3, 2003: Nikita Malinin; Season 4, 2004: Irina Dubtsova; Season 5, 2004: Victoria Dayneko; Season 6, 2006: Dmitry Koldun; Season 7, 2007: Anastasiya Prikhodko	Yana Churikova
Russia	Фабрика звёзд. Возвращение; Fabrika Zvyozd. Vozvrachtcheniè (All-Stars Format); Website	Channel One	Season 1, 2011: Victoria Dayneko	Yana Churikova
Russia	Фабрика звёзд. Россия-Украина; Fabrika Zvyozd. Rossiya-Ukrayina (All-Stars Format); Website; Website	Channel One; Novyi Kanal	Season 1, 2012: Russia	Yana Churikova; Dmitry Shepelyov
Russia	Новая Фабрика звёзд Novaya Fabrika zvyozd Website	Muz-TV (Season 1); TNT (Season 2)	Season 1, 2017: Guzel Hasanova; Season 2, 2024: Maria Gordeeva	Ksenia Sobchak (Season 1); Regina Todorenko; Timur Rodriguez (Season 2)
Spain	Operación Triunfo; Website; Website; Website	La 1 (Seasons 1–3, 9–11); Telecinco (Seasons 4–8); Amazon Prime Video (Season 12–)	Season 1, 2001–2002: Rosa López; Season 2, 2002–2003: Ainhoa Cantalapiedra; Season 3, 2003–2004: Vicente Seguí; Season 4, 2005: Sergio Rivero; Season 5, 2006–2007: Lorena Gómez; Season 6, 2008: Virginia Maestro; Season 7, 2009: Mario Álvarez; Season 8, 2011: Nahuel Sachak; Season 9, 2017–2018: Amaia Romero; Season 10, 2018: Famous Oberogo; Season 11, 2020: Nia Correia; Season 12, 2023–2024: Naiara Moreno; Season 13, 2025: Cristina Lora; Season 14, 2027: Upcoming season	Carlos Lozano (Season 1–3); Jesús Vázquez (Season 4–7); Pilar Rubio (Season 8); Roberto Leal (Season 9–11); Chenoa (Season 12–)
Turkey	Akademi Türkiye; Website	ATV	Season 1, 2004: Barış Akarsu	Öykü Serter
Turkey	Anadolu Rüzgarı; Website	TGRT	Season 2, 2005: Nesil	Öykü Serter
Turkey	Star Akademi Türkiye; Website	Kanal 1	Season 3, 2008: Bahadır Sağlam	Öykü Serter
Turkey	Star Akademi; Website	Star TV	Season 4, 2011: Giray Songül	Öykü Serter
Ukraine	Фабрика зірок Fabrika zirok tv/ua-en/series/37883-fabrika-zirok Website	Novyi Kanal (Seasons 1-4); Sweet.tv (Seasons 5)	Season 1, 2007–2008: Olha Tsybulska & Oleksandr Bodianskyi; Season 2, 2008: Volodymyr Dantes & Vadym Oliinyk; Season 3, 2009: Stas Shurins; Season 4, 2011: Yulia Rudneva; Season 5, 2026: Current season	Andriy Domansky (Season 1, 3); Dmitry Shepelev (Season 2); Vasilisa Frolova (Season 1); Masha Efrosinina (Season 3); Olexandr Pedan (Season 4); Erika (Season 4); Volodymyr Dantes (Season 5); Dasha Kubik (Season 5)
Ukraine	Фабрика Суперфiнал; Fabrika Superfinal (All-Stars Format)	Novyi Kanal	Season 1, 2010: Oleksiy Matias	Andriy Domansky; Masha Efrosinina
United Kingdom	Fame Academy; Website	BBC One; BBC Three	Season 1, 2002: David Sneddon; Season 2, 2003: Alex Parks	Cat Deeley; Patrick Kielty
United Kingdom	Comic Relief Does Fame Academy (Celebrity Format)	BBC One; BBC Three	Season 1, 2003: Will Mellor; Season 2, 2005: Edith Bowman; Season 3, 2007: Tara Palmer-Tomkinson	Cat Deeley (Seasons 1–2); Patrick Kielty (Seasons 1–3); Claudia Winkleman (Season 3)
United Kingdom	Fame Academy Bursary	BBC One; BBC Three	Season 1, 2003: Vishal Gopal; Season 2, 2003: Shona Kipling; Season 3, 2003: Daniel Allinson; Season 4, 2003: Daniel Powell; Season 5, 2003: David Rimbault	—N/a
United States (English)	The One: Making a Music Star; Website; Website	ABC; CBC	Season 1, 2006: Cancelled	George Stroumboulopoulos
United States (Spanish)	Operación Triunfo; Website	Telemundo	Season 1, 2026: Wandy Santana	Natalia Téllez
Vietnam	Star Academy: Ngôi nhà âm nhạc Website	HTV	Season 1, 2012: Phạm Quốc Huy	Yến Trang; Tuấn Tú
Vietnam	Star Academy Vietnam: Học viện ngôi sao Website	VTV	Season 1, 2014: Hoà Nguyễn (Hoà Minzy); Season 2, 2015: Nguyễn Ngọc Thảo Nhi	Dustin Nguyễn, Tú Linh (season 1) Mỹ Trâm, Cao Thanh Thảo My (season 2)
West Africa	Project Fame West Africa; Website	TV3 (Season 1–3); Metro TV (Season 4–present); Clare TV (Season 1–3, 5–present); SKY TV (Season 4); AIT (Season 1–5); GET TV (Season 5–present); MiTV; NTA; Nigerzie; ONTV; Silverbird; SoundCity; ABC TV (Season 1–3); SLBC (Season 4–5)	Season 1, 2008: Iyanya Mbuk; Season 2, 2009: Mike Anyasodo; Season 3, 2010: Chidinma Ekile; Season 4, 2011: Monica Ogah; Season 5, 2012: Ayobami Ayoola; Season 6, 2013: Olawale Ayodele; Season 7, 2014: Geoffrey Oji; Season 8, 2015: Jeffery Akor; Season 9, 2016: Okiemute Ighorodje	Dare Art Alade (Season 1); Funlola Raimi (Season 1); Joseph Benjamin (Season 2-9); Adaora Oleh (Season 2–6); Bolanle Olukanni (Season 7-9)
(Bosnia and Herzegovina) (Croatia) (North Macedonia) (Montenegro) (Serbia); Western Balkans	Операција триумф Operacija Trijumf; Website; Website; Website; Website	B92; Nova TV; TV In; FTV/RTRS; A1 TV	Season 1, 2008–2009: Adnan Babajić	Ana Mihajlovski; Nikolina Pišek; Milan Kalinić; Maca Marinković

== Star Search ==
Region/Country	Local name	Network	Main presenter	Years aired	Seasons
Germany	Star Search – Das Duell der Stars von Morgen (Star Search - The Duel of the Stars of Tomorrow)	Sat.1	Kai Pflaume	2003-2004	2
United States of America	Star Search	Syndication	Ed McMahon	1983-1995	9
United States of America	Star Search	CBS	Arsenio Hall	2003-2004	1
United States of America	Pet Star	Animal Planet	Mario Lopez	2002-2005	3

== Survivor ==
Country/Region	Local title English title	Network(s)	Winners	Host(s)
Botswana, Ethiopia, Ghana, Kenya, Namibia, Nigeria, Zambia, Zimbabwe	Survivor Africa	M-Net	Season 1, 2006: Tsholofelo Gasenelwe	Anthony Oseyemi
Argentina	Expedición Robinson; Expedition Robinson	Canal 13	Season 1, 2000: Sebastián Martino; Season 2, 2001: María Victoria Fernández	Julián Weich
Argentina	Survivor, Expedición Robinson; Survivor, Expedition Robinson	Telefe	Season 3, 2024: Eugenia Propedo; Season 4, 2026: Upcoming season	Marley
Australia	Australian Survivor	Nine Network	Season 1, 2002: Rob Dickson	Lincoln Howes
Australia	Australian Survivor	Network 10	Season 3, 2016: Kristie Bennett; Season 4, 2017: Jericho Malabonga; Season 5, 2018: Shane Gould; Season 6, 2019: Pia Miranda; Season 7, 2020: David Genat; Season 8, 2021: Hayley Leake; Season 9, 2022: Mark Wales; Season 10, 2023: Liz Parnov; Season 11, 2024: Feras Basal; Season 12, 2025: Myles Kuah; Season 13, 2025: Parvati Shallow; Season 14, 2026: Caleb Beeby; Season 15, 2027: Upcoming season	Current; David Genat (14–); Former; Jonathan LaPaglia (3–13)
Australia	Australian Celebrity Survivor	Seven Network	Season 2, 2006: Guy Leech	Ian "Dicko" Dickson
Austria, Germany	Expedition Robinson	ORF; RTL 2	Season 1, 2000: Melanie Lauer (Note: The German RTL2 created their own version of Survivor, Gestrandet – Zeig, was in dir steckt!, after airing a co-production of Austrian-German Survivor in season 1. Austria had not continued its own series nor co-produced an Austrian-German Survivor after season 1.)	Volker Piesczek
Azerbaijan	Ekstrim Azərbaycan; Extreme Azerbaijan	Space TV	Season 1, 2011: Kemal Cenk İçten	Emin Əhmədov
Balkans; Croatia; Serbia; Montenegro; Bosnia&Herz.	Survivor	RTL Televizija (Croatia); Prva Srpska Televizija (Serbia)	Season 1, 2012: Vlada Vuksanović (Note: Is a season co-produced by the Croatian and Serbian franchises. It was the second season of Survivor to air in Croatia and the fourth season to air in Serbia.)	Andrija Milošević; Marijana Batinić; Antonija Blaće; Milan Kalinić
Balkans; Croatia; Serbia; Montenegro; Bosnia&Herz.	Survivor	Nova BH (Bosnia and Herzegovina); Nova M (Montenegro); Nova S (Serbia); Nova TV (Croatia)	Season 2, 2022: Stefan Nevistić and Nevena Blanuša (Note: Is a season co-produced by the Croatian and Serbian franchises. It was the third season of Survivor to air in Croatia and the fifth season to air in Serbia.); Season 3, 2023: Nataša Kondić and Antonia Ivić; Season 4, 2024: Tijana Jeremić and Luka Rimac; Season 5, 2025: Uroš Čiča and Luciano Plazibat; Season 6, 2026: Marko Ristić & Roko Bačelić	Current; Ammar Mešić (6–); Vlado Boban (5–); Former; Bojan Perić (2–5); Mario Mlinarić (2–4); Danijela Buzurović (Note: Is host of the Tv show Survivor plus, which is aired on Nova S and Nova M)
Estonia, Latvia, Lithuania	Robinsonid / Robinsoni / Robinzonai; Robinson	TV3 Estonia; TV3 Latvia; TV3 Lithuania	Season 1, 2000: Zane Mukāne; Season 2, 2001: Māris Šveiduks; Season 3, 2002: Rimas Valeikis	Emil Rutiku; Mārtiņš Freimanis (Season 1); Pauls Timrots (Seasons 2–3); Vytautas Kernagis
Estonia, Latvia, Lithuania	Džunglistaar / Džungļu zvaigznes / Džiungles; Jungle Stars	TV3 Estonia; TV3 Latvia; TV3 Lithuania	Season 1, 2004: Dagmāra Legante	Tõnu Kark; Raimond Dombrovskis; Vytautas Kernagis
Belgium, Flanders	Expeditie Robinson; Expedition Robinson	VIER	Season 1, 2018: Robbe De Backer	Bartel Van Riet
Belgium, Netherlands	Expeditie Robinson; Expedition Robinson	VT4; NET 5	Season 1, 2000: Karin Lindenhovius; Season 2, 2001: Richard Mackowiak; Season 3, 2002: Derek Blok; Season 4, 2003: Jutta Borms; Season 5, 2004: Frank de Meulder	Ernst-Paul Hasselbach (1–5); Désiré Naessens (1); Roos Van Acker (2–5)
Belgium, Netherlands	Expeditie Robinson; Expedition Robinson	Tien; 2BE; RTL 5	Season 6, 2005: Marnix Allegaert; Season 7, 2006: Olga Urashova	Ernst-Paul Hasselbach (6–7); Lotte Verlackt (6–7); Evi Hanssen (7)
Belgium, Netherlands	Expeditie Robinson; Expedition Robinson	2BE; RTL 5	Season 8, 2007: Vinncent Arrendell; Season 9, 2008: Yin Oei Sian; Season 10, 2009: Marcel Vandezande; Season 11, 2010: Regina Romeijn; Season 12, 2011: Tanja Dexters; Season 13, 2012: Fatima Moreira de Melo	Ernst-Paul Hasselbach (8–9); Evi Hanssen (8–13); Eddy Zoëy (10–12); Dennis Weening (13)
Belgium, Netherlands	Expeditie Robinson; Expedition Robinson	VIER; Videoland	Season 21, 2020: Thomas Roobrouck	Bartel Van Riet; Geraldine Kemper
Belgium, Netherlands	Expeditie Robinson; Expedition Robinson	VTM; RTL 4	Season 28, 2026: Current season	Camille Vanuxem; Edson da Graça; Nicolette Kluijver
Belgium, Netherlands	Expeditie Robinson: Strijd der Titanen; Expedition Robinson: Battle of the Titans	Tien; 2BE	Season 1, 2006: Ryan van Esch	Ernst-Paul Hasselbach; Lotte Verlackt
Brazil	No Limite; On the Edge	TV Globo	Season 1, 2000: Elaine de Melo; Season 2, 2001: Léo Rassi; Season 3, 2001: Rodrigo Trigueiro; Season 4, 2009: Luciana de Araújo; Season 5, 2021: Paula Amorim; Season 6, 2022: Charles Gama; Season 7, 2023: Dedé Macedo	Zeca Camargo (1–4); André Marques (5); Fernando Fernandes (6–7)
Bulgaria	Сървайвър БГ; Survivor BG	bTV	Season 1, 2006: Neli Ivanova; Season 2, 2007: Georgi Kostadinov; Season 3, 2008: Nikolay Martinov; Season 4, 2009: Georgi Kehaiov; Season 5, 2014: Vanja Džaferović; Season 6, 2022: Zoran Petrovski; Season 7, 2023: Blagoy Georgiev	Kamen Vodenicharov (1); Vladimir Karamazov (2–3; 4 [from day 21]–6); Evtim Miloshev (4 [to day 20]); Vanja Džaferović (7)
Canada (Quebec)	Survivor Québec	Noovo	Season 1, 2023: Nicolas Brunette; Season 2, 2024: Ghyslain Octeau-Piché; Season 3, 2025: Geneviève La Haye; Season 4, 2026: Kathrine Huet; Season 5, 2027: Upcoming season	Patrice Bélanger
China	走入香格里拉; Into the Shangri-La	CCTV	Season 1, 2001: Members of Sun Village	Unknown
Chile	Expedición Robinson: La Isla VIP; Expedition Robinson: The VIP Island	Canal 13	Season 1, 2006: Marcela Roberts	Sergio Lagos; Karla Constant
Colombia	Expedición Robinson; Expedition Robinson	Caracol TV	Season 1, 2001: Rolando Patarroyo; Season 2, 2002: Cristóbal Echevarría	Margarita Francisco
Colombia	La Isla de Los Famos.o.s. (1–4); The Island of the Famous; Survivor: La Isla de Los Famosos (5)	RCN TV	Season 1, 2004: María Cecilia Sánchez; Season 2, 2005: Leonel Álvarez; Season 3, 2006: Lucas Jaramillo; Season 4, 2007: José Javier Ramírez; Season 5, 2023: Juan del Mar	Guillermo Prieto (1–4); Katerine Porto (1); Tatán Mejía (5)
Croatia	Survivor: Odisejev Otok; Survivor: Odyssey Island	HRT 2	Season 1, 2005: Vazmenko Pervan	Kristijan Potočki
Czech Republic	Trosečník	Prima televize	Season 1, 2006: Ingrid Golasová	Marek Vašut
Czech Republic	Robinsonův ostrov Robinson Island	TV Nova	Season 1, 2017: Marek Orlík; Season 2, 2018: Martin Složil	Ondřej Novotný
Czechia; Slovakia	Survivor Česko & Slovensko	Current; TV Nova (1-); Voyo SK (2-); Former; Markíza (1)	Season 1, 2022: Vladimír Čapek; Season 2, 2023: Tomáš Weimann; Season 3, 2024: Martin "Mikýř" Mikyska; Season 4, 2025: Pavel Tóth; Season 5, 2026: Otakar Šenkýř; Season 6, 2027: Upcoming season	Current; Ondřej Novotný(1-); Former; Martin Šmahel (1)
Denmark	Robinson Ekspeditionen; Robinson Expedition	TV3	Season 1, 1998: Regina Pedersen; Season 2, 1999: Dan Marstrand; Season 3, 2000: Sonny Rønne Pedersen; Season 4, 2001: Malene Hasselblad; Season 5, 2002: Henrik Ørum; Season 6, 2003: Frank Quistgard; Season 7, 2004: Mette Frandsen; Season 8, 2005: Mogens Brandstrup; Season 9, 2006: Diego Tur; Season 10, 2007: Rikke Gøransson; Season 11, 2008: Daniela Hansen; Season 12, 2009: Villy Eenberg; Season 13, 2010: Søren Engelbret; Season 14, 2011: Hugo Kleister; Season 15, 2013: Jeppe Bruun Hansen; Season 16, 2014: Stina Herbenö; Season 17, 2015: Kenneth Mikkelsen; Season 18, 2016: Henrik Oltmann Andersen; Season 19, 2017: Marlene Berardino; Season 20, 2018: Jamil Faizi; Season 21, 2019: Nis Andreas Prio Sørensen; Season 22, 2021: Katrine Ørskov Hedeman; Season 23, 2022: Mikkel Bertelsen; Season 24, 2023: Majbritt Fejfer Olsen; Season 25, 2024: Nicolaj Schrøder; Season 26, 2025: Anton Basbas Pedersen; Season 27, 2026: Current season	Current; Jakob Kjeldbjerg (7–present); Former; Thomas Mygind (1–6)
Ecuador	Expedición Robinson; Expedition Robinson	Teleamazonas	Season 1, 2003: Tito Grefa	Marisa Sánchez
Finland	Suomen Robinson; Finnish Robinson	Nelonen	Season 1, 2004: Marjaana Valkeinen; Season 2, 2005: Mira Jantunen	Jarmo Mäkinen (1); Arttu Harkki (2)
Finland	Selviytyjät Suomi; Survivors Finland	MTV3	Season 1, 2013: Jarkko Kortesoja	Heikki Paasonen
Finland	Selviytyjät Suomi; Survivors Finland	Nelonen	Season 2, 2018: Sampo Kaulanen; Season 3, 2019: Miska Haakana; Season 4, 2019: Kai Fagerlund; Season 5, 2021: Kristian Heiskari; Season 6, 2021: Shirly Karvinen; Season 7, 2022: Sami Helenius; Season 8, 2023: Teemu Roivainen; Season 9, 2024: Mia "Millu" Haataja; Season 10, 2025: Saana Akiola; Season 11, 2026: Current season	Current; Riku Rantala (8–present); Former; Juuso Mäkilähde (2–7)
France (Belgium) (Note: Starting from the 11th season, Belgians were eligible to apply for the French series.) (Switzerland) (Note: Starting from the 10th season, the Swiss were eligible to apply for the French series.)	Koh-Lanta	TF1	Season 1, 2001: Gilles Nicolet; Season 2, 2002: Amel Fatnassi; Season 3, 2003: Isabelle Seguin and Delphine Bano; Season 4, 2004: Philippe Bordier; Season 5, 2005: Clémence Castel; Season 6, 2006: François-David Cardonnel; Season 7, 2007: Jade Handi and Kevin Cuoco; Season 8, 2008: Christelle Gauzet; Season 9, 2009: Christina Chevry; Season 10, 2010: Philippe Duron; Season 11, 2011: Gérard Urdampilleta; Season 12, 2012–13: Ugo Lartiche; Season 13, 2013: Cancelled; Season 14, 2015: Marc Rambaud; Season 15, 2016: Wendy Gervois; Season 16, 2016: Benoît Assadi; Season 17, 2017: Frédéric Blancher; Season 18, 2017: André Deleplace; Season 19, 2018: Cancelled; Season 20, 2019: Maud Bamps; Season 21, 2020: Alexandra Pornet; Season 22, 2021: Maxine Eouzan; Season 23, 2022: Bastien San Pedro and François Descamp; Season 24, 2023: Frédéric Khouvilay; Season 25, 2024: Léa Sahin; Season 26, 2024: Thibault Bélanger; Season 27, 2025: Gaëlle Fleury; Season 28, 2026: Cynthia Combes; Season 29, 2027: Upcoming season	Current; Denis Brogniart (2–present); Former; Hubert Auriol (1)
France (Belgium) (Switzerland)	Koh-Lanta: All-Stars	TF1	Season 1, 2009: Romuald Lafite; Season 2, 2010: Grégoire Delachaux; Season 3, 2012: Bertrand Bolle; Season 4, 2014: Laurent Maistret; Season 5, 2018: Clémence Castel; Season 6, 2020: Naoil Tita; Season 7, 2021: No Winner; Season 8, 2026: Current season	Denis Brogniart
Georgia	უკანასკნელი გმირი The Last Hero	Rustavi 2	Season 1, 2007–08: Tamar Chanturashvili	Giorgi Korkia
Germany	Das Inselduell	Sat.1	Unofficial adaption, 2000: Michael	Holger Speckhahn
Germany	Expedition Robinson	ORF; RTL 2	Season 1, 2000: Melanie Lauer	Volker Piesczek
Germany	Gestrandet – Zeig, was in dir steckt!^{1}	RTL 2	Season 1, 2001: Alexander Kolo	Pierre Geisensetter
Germany	Outback	RTL	Unofficial adaption of Survivor: The Australian Outback, 2002: Sergej Schmidt	Markus Lanz
Germany	Survivor	ProSieben	Season 1, 2007: Volker Kreuzner	Sascha Kalupke
Germany	Survivor	VOX	Season 2, 2019: Lara Grünfeld	Florian Weber
Germany	Survivor	Sport1	Season 3, 2026: Larissa Elena Renz	Detlef Soost
Greece; Cyprus	Survivor	Mega TV	Season 1, 2003: Evaggelia Dermetzoglou; Season 2, 2004: Konstantinos Christodoulopoulos	Grigoris Arnaoutoglou
Greece; Cyprus	Survivor	Skai TV; Sigma TV	Season 5, 2017: Giorgos Angelopoulos; Season 6, 2018: Ilias Gotsis; Season 8, 2020–21: Sakis Katsoulis; Season 9, 2021–22: Stathis Schizas; Season 11, 2024: Daniel Nurka; Season 12, 2024: Ninos Nikolaidis; Season 13, 2026: Stavros Floros (Note: Following a boating incident, production was suspended. The prize money and title of "Sole Survivor" was award to Stavros Floros)	Current; Giorgos Lianos (6–present); Former; Sakis Tanimanidis (5–7)
Greece; Cyprus	Survivor Patagonia; The Edge of the World	Mega TV	Season 4, 2010: Vaggelis Gerasimou	Giannis Aivazis
Greece; Cyprus	Survivor: Greece vs. Turkey (Note: Survivor: Greece vs. Turkey is a co-production between the Greek and Turkish Survivor franchises.)	Mega TV	Season 3, 2006: Derya Durmuşlar	Konstantinos Markoulakis
Greece; Cyprus	Survivor: Greece vs. Turkey	Skai TV; Sigma TV	Season 7, 2019: Katerina Dalaka & Yusuf Karakaya	Sakis Tanimanidis; Giorgos Lianos
Greece; Cyprus	Survivor All Star	Skai TV; Sigma TV	Season 10, 2023: Sakis Katsoulis	Giorgos Lianos
Hungary	Survivor – A sziget Survivor – The Island	RTL (Note: Channel name was RTL Klub for seasons 1–5 before the station's name change to RTL starting with season 6.)	Season 1, 2003: Tünde Molnár; Season 2, 2004: Dávid Hankó; Season 3, 2017: Iliász Shweirif; Season 4, 2018: Dávid Tömböly; Season 5, 2021: Dániel Pintér; Season 6, 2023: Viktória Kiss	Current; Miklós Varga (5–present); Former; András Stohl (1–2); Istenes Bence (3–4)
India (Hindi)	Survivor India – The Ultimate Battle	Star Plus	Season 1, 2012: Raj Rani	Sameer Kochhar
India (Tamil)	Survivor Tamil	Zee Tamil	Season 1, 2021: Vijayalakshmi Feroz	Arjun Sarja
Israel	הישרדות; Survival	Channel 10	Season 1, 2007–08: Na'ama Kaesari; Season 2, 2008–09: Erik Alper; Season 3, 2009: Shay Arel; Season 4, 2010: Natan Bashevkin; Season 5, 2011: Irit Rahamim Basis	Guy Zu-Aretz
Israel	הישרדות; Survival	Channel 2	Season 7, 2015–16: Liron "Tiltil" Orfali; Season 8, 2017: Inbar Pinievsky Basson	Guy Zu-Aretz
Israel	הישרדות; Survival	Reshet 13	Season 12, 2022–23: Elit Musayof; Season 13, 2024–25: Nitzan Yerushalmy; Season 14, 2026: Current season	Guy Zu-Aretz
Israel	הישרדות VIP; Survival VIP	Channel 10	Season 6, 2012: Itay Segev	Guy Zu-Aretz
Israel	הישרדות VIP; Survival VIP	Reshet 13	Season 9, 2019: Đovani Roso; Season 10, 2020: Asi Buzaglo; Season 11, 2021–22: Alla Eibinder	Guy Zu-Aretz
Italy	Survivor Italia	Italia 1	Season 1, 2001: Milica Miletic	Pietro Suber; Benedetta Corbi (Studio)
Italy	L'Isola dei Famosi; The Island of the Famous	Rai 2	Season 1, 2003: Walter Nudo; Season 2, 2004: Sergio Múñiz; Season 3, 2005: Lory Del Santo; Season 4, 2006: Luca Calvani; Season 5, 2007: Manuela Villa; Season 6, 2008: Vladimir Luxuria; Season 7, 2010: Daniele Battaglia; Season 8, 2011: Giorgia Palmas; Season 9, 2012: Antonella Elia	Simona Ventura (Studio, 1–8); Marco Mazzocchi (1); Massimo Caputi (2–3); Paolo Brosio (4); Francesco Facchinetti (5); Filippo Magnini (6); Rossano Rubicondi (7); Daniele Battaglia (8); Nicola Savino (Studio, 9); Vladimir Luxuria (9)
Italy	L'Isola dei Famosi; The Island of the Famous	Canale 5	Season 10, 2015: Donatella; Season 11, 2016: Giacobbe Fragomeni; Season 12, 2017: Raz Degan; Season 13, 2018: Nino "Gaspare" Formicola; Season 14, 2019: Marco Maddaloni; Season 15, 2021: Simone Paciello; Season 16, 2022: Nicolas Vaporidis; Season 17, 2023: Marco Mazzoli; Season 18, 2024: Aras Şenol; Season 19, 2025: Cristina Plevani; Season 20, 2026: Upcoming season	Current; Veronica Gentili (Studio, 19–present); Pierpaolo Pretelli (19–present); Former; Alessia Marcuzzi (Studio, 10–14); Alberto 'Alvin' Bonato (10–11, 14,16–17); Stefano Bettarini (12); Stefano De Martino (13); Ilary Blasi (Studio, 15–17); Massimiliano Rosolino (15); Vladimir Luxuria (Studio, 18); Elenoire Casalegno (18)
Japan	サバイバー; Survivor	TBS	Season 1, Spring 2002: Eri Minoshima; Season 2, Summer 2002: Asami Kawamura; Season 3, Fall 2002: Yasuhito Ebisawa; Season 4, Winter 2003: Kōshin Gunji	Neptune; Munehiro Tokita
Lebanon	سرفايفر; Survivor	LBC	Season 1, 2004: Hussein El-Abass	Tareq Mounir
Mexico	Survivor México	Azteca Uno	Season 1, 2020: Eduardo Urbina; Season 2, 2021: Pablo Martí; Season 3, 2022: Julian Huergo; Season 4, 2023: Pablo Martí; Season 5, 2024: Esmeralda Zamora; Season 6, 2025: Sergio Torres; Season 7, 2026: Avril Andrade	Current; Carlos Guerrero (2–present); Former; Arturo Islas Allende (1)
Netherlands	Expeditie Robinson; Expedition Robinson	RTL 5	Season 14, 2013: Edith Bosch; Season 15, 2014: Kay Nambiar; Season 16, 2015: Amara Onwuka; Season 17, 2016: Bertie Steur; Season 18, 2017: Carlos Platier Luna; Season 19, 2018: Jan Bronninkreef	Current; Nicolette Kluijver (15–present); Edson da Graça (27-present); Former; Evi Hanssen (14); Dennis Weening (14–19); Kaj Gorgels (20–22); Rick Brandsteder (24); Art Rooijakkers (25–26)
Netherlands	Expeditie Robinson; Expedition Robinson	RTL 4	Season 20, 2019: Hugo Kennis; Season 22, 2021: Robbert Rodenburg; Season 24, 2022: Dennis Wilt; Season 25, 2023: Willem Voogd; Season 26, 2024: Kiran Badloe; Season 27, 2025: Camiel Kesbeke	Current; Nicolette Kluijver (15–present); Edson da Graça (27-present); Former; Evi Hanssen (14); Dennis Weening (14–19); Kaj Gorgels (20–22); Rick Brandsteder (24); Art Rooijakkers (25–26)
Netherlands	Expeditie Robinson: All Stars; Expedition Robinson: All Stars	RTL 4	Season 23, 2022: Niels Gomperts	Art Rooijakkers; Geraldine Kemper
New Zealand	Survivor NZ	TVNZ 2	Season 1, 2017: Avi Duckor-Jones; Season 2, 2018: Lisa Stanger	Matt Chisholm
Norway	Robinsonekspedisjonen; Expedition Robinson	TV3	Season 1, 1999: Christer Falck; Season 2, 2000: Therese Andersen; Season 3, 2001: Mia Martinsen; Season 4, 2002: Ann Karene Molvig; Season 5, 2003: Emil Orderud; Season 6, 2004: Jan Stian Gundersen; Season 7, 2007: Ann-Kristin Otnes; Season 8, 2008: Tom Andre Tveitan; Season 9, 2009: Lina Iversen; Season 10, 2010: Alita Dagmar Kristensen; Season 11, 2011: Lillan Ramøy; Season 12, 2012: Elisabeth Nielsen; Season 13, 2013: Bjørn Tore Bekkeli; Season 16, 2021: Maiken Charlotte Hetle; Season 17, 2022: Are Lundby Kvaal	Nils Ole Oftebro (1); Christer Falck (2–15); Silje Torp (16–17)
Norway	Robinsonekspedisjonen; Expedition Robinson	TV2	Season 14, 2015: Maiken Sæther Olsen; Season 15, 2016: Thomas Larsen	Nils Ole Oftebro (1); Christer Falck (2–15); Silje Torp (16–17)
Pakistan	Survivor Pakistan	PTV; ARY; TVOne	Season 1, 2006: Muhammad Ziad	Unknown
Philippines	Survivor Philippines	GMA Network	Season 1, 2008: John Carlo "JC" Tiuseco; Season 2, 2009: Amanda Coolley Van Cooll	Paolo Bediones
Philippines	Survivor Philippines: Celebrity Showdown	GMA Network	Season 3, 2010: Akihiro Sato; Season 4, 2011–12: Albert "Betong" Sumaya Jr.	Richard Gutierrez
Poland	Wyprawa Robinson; Expedition Robinson	TVN	Season 1, 2004: Katarzyna Drzyżdżyk	Hubert Urbański
Poland	Wyspa przetrwania Island of Survival	Polsat	Season 2, 2017: Katarzyna Cebula	Damian Michałowski
Portugal	Survivor	TVI	Season 1, 2001: Pedro Besugo	Paulo Salvador; Teresa Guilherme
Romania	Supraviețuitorul; The Survivor	Pro TV	Season 1, 2016: Lucian "Zapp" Lupu	Dragoș Bucurenci (1)
Romania	Survivor România; Survivor Romania	Kanal D	Season 1, 2020: Elena Ionescu; Season 2, 2021: Edmond Zannidache	Dan Cruceru (1); Daniel Pavel (2–6)
Romania	Survivor România; Survivor Romania	Pro TV, Voyo	Season 3, 2022: Alex Delea; Season 4, 2023: Dan Ursa; Season 6, 2025: Ovidiu "Uwe Dai" Măcinic	Dan Cruceru (1); Daniel Pavel (2–6)
Romania	Survivor România; Survivor Romania	Antena 1	Season 7, 2026: Gabriel Tamaș; Season 8, 2027: Upcoming season	Adi Vasile (7–)
Romania	Survivor România All Stars; Survivor Romania All Stars	Pro TV, Voyo	Season 5, 2024: Edmond Zannidache	Daniel Pavel
Russia	Последний герой The Last Hero	C1R	Season 1, 2001: Sergey Odintsov; Season 2, 2002–03: Veronika Norkina; Season 3, 2003: Vladimir Presnyakov Jr. Season 4, 2003–04: Yana Volkova; Season 5, 2004: Aleksandr Matveev; Season 6, 2008–09: Vladimir Lysenko	Sergei Bodrov Jr. (1); Dmitry Pevtsov (2); Nikolai Fomenko (3); Aleksandr Domogarov (4); Vladimir Menshov (5); Ksenia Sobchak (6)
Russia	Последний герой The Last Hero	TV-3	Season 7, 2019: Anfisa Chernykh; Season 8, 2020: Nadezhda Angarskaya; Season 9, 2021: Roman Nikkel; Season 10, 2023: Alexey Lukin; Season 11, 2024: Dmitriy Konyshev	Current; Kseniya Borodina (10–11); Former; Yana Troyanova (7–9)
Denmark, Norway, Sweden	Expedition Robinson: VIP (Note: Expedition Robinson 2005 (VIP) was a pan-regional version of Denmark, Norway, and Sweden.)	TV3 Denmark; TV3 Norway; TV3 Sweden	Season 1, 2005: Tilde Fröling	Mikkel Beha Erichsen (Denmark); Christer Falck (Norway); Robert Aschberg (Sweden)
Serbia	Survivor Srbija; Survivor Serbia	Prva TV	Season 1, 2008–09: Nemanja Pavlov; Season 2, 2009–10: Aleksandar Krajišnik; Season 3, 2010–11: Andrej Maričić	Andrija Milošević
Slovakia	Celebrity Camp	TV JOJ	Season 1, 2007: Aneta Parišková	Janko Kroner; Petra Polnišová
Slovakia	Ostrov; Island	Markíza	Season 1, 2016: Filip Ferianec	Marián Mitaš
Slovenia	Survivor Srbija; Survivor Serbia	TV 3	Season 1, 2009–10: See Survivor Srbija 2	Ula Furlan
Slovenia	Survivor Slovenija; Survivor Slovenia	POP TV	Season 2, 2016: Alen Perklič	Miran Stanovnik
South Africa	Survivor South Africa	M-Net	Season 1, 2006: Vanessa Marawa; Season 2, 2007: Lorette Mostert; Season 3, 2010: Perle "GiGi" van Schalkwyk; Season 4, 2011: Hykie Berg; Season 5, 2014: Graham Jenneker; Season 6, 2018: Tom Swartz; Season 7, 2019: Robert "Rob" Bentele; Season 8, 2021: Nicole Wilmans; Season 9, 2022: Dino Paulo	Current; Nico Panagio (3–9); Former; Mark Bayly (1–2)
Spain	Supervivientes: Expedición Robinson; Survivors: Expedition Robinson	Telecinco	Season 1, 2000: Xavier Monjonell; Season 2, 2001: Alfredo "Freddy" Cortina	Juan Manuel López Iturriaga (1–2); Paco Lobatón (2)
Spain	La Isla de los FamoS.O.S. The Island of the Famou-S.O.S.	Antena 3	Season 3, 2003: Daniela Cardone; Season 4, 2003: Felipe López	Paula Vázquez; Alonso Caparrós (3); Nuria Roca (4)
Spain	La Selva de los FamoS.O.S. The Jungle of the Famou-S.O.S.	Antena 3	Season 5, 2004: Jose Antonio Canales Rivera	Paula Vázquez; Nuria Roca
Spain	Aventura en África; Adventure in Africa	Antena 3	Season 6, 2005: Víctor Janeiro	Paula Vázquez; Nuria Roca
Spain	Supervivientes; Survivors	Telecinco	Season 7, 2006: Carmen Russo; Season 8, 2007: Nilo Manrique; Season 9, 2008: Miriam Sánchez; Season 10, 2009: Maite Zúñiga; Season 11, 2010: María José Fernández; Season 12, 2011: Rosa Benito; Season 13, 2014: Abraham García; Season 14, 2015: Christopher Mateo; Season 15, 2016: Jorge Díaz; Season 16, 2017: José Luis Losa; Season 17, 2018: Sofía Suescun; Season 18, 2019: Omar Montes; Season 19, 2020: Jorge Pérez; Season 20, 2021: Olga Moreno; Season 21, 2022: Alejandro Nieto; Season 22, 2023: Bosco Blach Martínez-Bordiú; Season 23, 2024: Pedro García Aguado; Season 24, 2024: Marta Peñate; Season 25, 2025: Borja González; Season 26, 2025: Rubén Torres; Season 27, 2026: Maica Benedicto; Season 28, 2026: Current season	Main host: Jesús Vázquez (7–11); Christian Gálvez (10); Jorge Javier Vázquez (12–); Carlos Sobera (22); Island host: José María Íñigo (7); Mario Picazo (8–10); Eva González (11); Raquel Sánchez Silva (12–13); Lara Álvarez (14–21); Laura Madrueño (22–); Tuesday gala: Jorge Javier Vázquez (16–17); Carlos Sobera (18–); Debate: Lucía Riaño (8); Emma García (9; 11); Daniel Domenjó (10); Christian Gálvez (12); Álvaro de la Lama (13); Raquel Sánchez Silva (14); Sandra Barneda (15–17; 23-); Jordi González (18–20); Ion Aramendi (21–22)
Sweden	Expedition Robinson	SVT	Season 1, 1997: Martin Melin; Season 2, 1998: Alexandra Zazzi; Season 3, 1999: Jerker Dalman; Season 4, 2000: Mattias Dalerstedt; Season 5, 2001–02: Jan Emanuel Johansson; Season 6, 2002: Antoni Matacz; Season 7, 2003–04: Emma Andersson	Harald Treutiger (1–2); Anders Lundin (3–7)
Sweden	Expedition Robinson	TV3	Season 8, 2004: Jerry Forsberg; Season 9, 2005: Karolina Conrad	Robert Aschberg
Sweden	Expedition Robinson	TV4	Season 10, 2009: Ellenor Pierre; Season 11, 2009–10: Hans Brettschneider; Season 12, 2010: Erik Svedberg; Season 13, 2011: Mats Kemi; Season 14, 2012: Mariana "Mirre" Hammarling; Season 16, 2018: Daniel "DK" Westlund; Season 17, 2019: Klas Beyer; Season 18, 2020: Michael "Micke" Björklund; Season 19, 2021: Dennis Johansson; Season 20, Spring 2022: Filip Johansson; Season 21, Fall 2022: Lars-Olov Johansson; Season 22, 2023: Oskar Hammarstedt; Season 23, 2023: Pelle Lilja; Season 24, 2024: Olivia Lindegren; Season 25, 2024: Ida Jensen Krogstad; Season 26, 2025: Aron Sjölund; Season 27, 2025: Johan Ekström; Season 28, 2026: Sonja Fredriksdotter Rudqvist; Season 29, 2026: Current season Season 30, 2027: Upcoming season	Current; Anders Lundin (3–7, 22–present); Martin Järborg (27–present); Harald Treutiger (30-present); Former; Linda Isacsson (10); Paolo Roberto (11–14); Anders Öfvergård (16–20); Petra Malm (21, 23, 25); Anna Brolin (26)
Sweden	Expedition Robinson	Sjuan	Season 15, 2015: Dan Spinelli Scala & Jennifer Egelryd	Linda Lindorff
Switzerland	Expedition Robinson	TV3	Season 1, 1999: Andreas Widmer; Season 2, 2000: Stefanie Ledermann; Season 3, 2002: Carole Haari (Note: The season never aired due to the television network being shut down. The winner was only revealed later in a news article.)	Silvan Grütter
Turkey	Survivor: Büyük Macera; Survivor: Great Adventure	Kanal D	Season 1, 2005: Uğur Pektaş	Ahmet Utlu
Turkey	Survivor: Greece vs. Turkey	Show TV	Season 2, 2006: Derya Durmuşlar	Acun Ilıcalı (2)
Turkey	Survivor: Greece vs. Turkey	TV8	Season 13, 2019: Yusuf Karakaya & Katerina Dalaka	Acun Ilıcalı; Murat Ceylan
Turkey	Survivor	Show TV	Season 3, 2007: Taner Özdeş; Season 4, 2010: Merve Oflaz	Acun Ilıcalı (3–4); Hanzade Ofluoğlu (4)
Turkey	Survivor: Ünlüler vs. Gönüllüler; Survivor: Celebrities vs. Volunteers	Show TV	Season 5, 2011: Derya Büyükuncu; Season 6, 2012: Nihat Altınkaya	Acun Ilıcalı; Burcu Esmersoy (6)
Turkey	Survivor: Ünlüler vs. Gönüllüler; Survivor: Celebrities vs. Volunteers	Star TV	Season 7, 2013: Hilmi Cem İntepe; Season 8, 2014: Turabi Çamkıran	Acun Ilıcalı; Alp Kırşan
Turkey	Survivor: Ünlüler vs. Gönüllüler; Survivor: Celebrities vs. Volunteers	TV8	Season 10, 2016: Çağan Atakan Arslan; Season 11, 2017: Ogeday Girişken; Season 12, 2018: Adem Kılıçcı	Acun Ilıcalı; Alp Kırşan
Turkey	Survivor: Ünlüler vs. Gönüllüler; Survivor: Celebrities vs. Volunteers	TV8	Season 14, 2020: Cemal Can Canseven; Season 15, 2021: İsmail Balaban; Season 17, 2023: Nefise Karatay; Season 19, 2025: Adem Kılıçcı; Season 20, 2026: Mert Nobre; Season 21, 2027: Upcoming season	Acun Ilıcalı; Murat Ceylan
Turkey	Survivor All Star	TV8	Season 9, 2015: Turabi Çamkıran; Season 16, 2022: Nisa Bölükbaşı; Season 18, 2024: Ogeday Girişken	Acun Ilıcalı; Alp Kırşan; Murat Ceylan
Ukraine	Oстанній герой The Last Hero	ICTV	Season 1, 2011: Andrey Kovalski; Season 2, 2012: Alexei Diveyeff-Tserkovny	Ostap Stupka
United Kingdom	Survivor	ITV	Series 1, 2001: Charlotte Hobrough; Series 2, 2002: Jonny Gibb	Mark Austin (1); John Leslie (1); Mark Nicholas (2)
United Kingdom	Survivor	BBC One	Series 3, 2023: Matthew Haywood	Joel Dommett
United States (Canada) (Note: Starting from the 39th season, Canadians were eligible to apply for the American series.)	Survivor	CBS	Season 1, 2000: Richard Hatch; Season 2, 2001: Tina Wesson; Season 3, 2001–02: Ethan Zohn; Season 4, Spring 2002: Vecepia Towery; Season 5, Fall 2002: Brian Heidik; Season 6, Spring 2003: Jenna Morasca; Season 7, Fall 2003: Sandra Diaz-Twine; Season 8, Spring 2004: Amber Brkich; Season 9, Fall 2004: Chris Daugherty; Season 10, Spring 2005: Tom Westman; Season 11, Fall 2005: Danni Boatwright; Season 12, Spring 2006: Aras Baskauskas; Season 13, Fall 2006: Yul Kwon; Season 14, Spring 2007: Earl Cole; Season 15, Fall 2007: Todd Herzog; Season 16, Spring 2008: Parvati Shallow; Season 17, Fall 2008: Robert "Bob" Crowley; Season 18, Spring 2009: James "J.T." Thomas Jr.; Season 19, Fall 2009: Natalie White; Season 20, Spring 2010: Sandra Diaz-Twine; Season 21, Fall 2010: Jud "Fabio" Birza; Season 22, Spring 2011: Rob Mariano; Season 23, Fall 2011: Sophie Clarke; Season 24, Spring 2012: Kim Spradlin; Season 25, Fall 2012: Denise Stapley; Season 26, Spring 2013: John Cochran; Season 27, Fall 2013: Tyson Apostol; Season 28, Spring 2014: Tony Vlachos; Season 29, Fall 2014: Natalie Anderson; Season 30, Spring 2015: Mike Holloway; Season 31, Fall 2015: Jeremy Collins; Season 32, Spring 2016: Michele Fitzgerald; Season 33, Fall 2016: Adam Klein; Season 34, Spring 2017: Sarah Lacina; Season 35, Fall 2017: Ben Driebergen; Season 36, Spring 2018: Wendell Holland; Season 37, Fall 2018: Nick Wilson; Season 38, Spring 2019: Chris Underwood; Season 39, Fall 2019: Tommy Sheehan; Season 40, 2020: Tony Vlachos; Season 41, 2021: Erika Casupanan; Season 42, Spring 2022: Maryanne Oketch; Season 43, Fall 2022: Mike Gabler; Season 44, Spring 2023: Yamil "Yam Yam" Arocho; Season 45, Fall 2023: Dee Valladares; Season 46, Spring 2024: Kenzie Petty; Season 47, Fall 2024: Rachel LaMont; Season 48, Spring 2025: Kyle Fraser; Season 49, Fall 2025: Savannah Louie; Season 50, Spring 2026: Aubry Bracco; Season 51, Fall 2026: Current season	Jeff Probst
Venezuela	Robinson: La Gran Aventura; Robinson: The Great Adventure	Venevisión	Season 1, 2001: Gabriel Pérez; Season 2, 2002: Graciela Boza	Roberto Messuti
Vietnam	Tôi là người dẫn đầu I am the Leader	HTV7	Season 1, 2012: Quách Văn Đen	Phan Anh

== Top Model ==
Active
No longer active

Region/country	Name(s) of series	Network(s)	Cycle(s) & winner(s)	Host(s)
Africa	Africa's Next Top Model	M-net Africa Magic	Cycle 1, 2013–2014: Aamito Lagum	Oluchi Onweagba
Albania	Albania's Next Top Model	Top Channel (cycle 1); Supersonic TV (cycle 2)	Cycle 1, 2010–2011: Erida Lama; Cycle 2, 2011: Greis Drenn	Aurela Hoxha
Australia	Australia's Next Top Model	Fox8	Cycle 1, 2005: Gemma Sanderson; Cycle 2, 2006: Eboni Stocks; Cycle 3, 2007: Alice Burdeu; Cycle 4, 2008: Demelza Reveley; Cycle 5, 2009: Tahnee Atkinson; Cycle 6, 2010: Amanda Ware; Cycle 7, 2011: Montana Cox; Cycle 8, 2013: Melissa Juratowitch; Cycle 9, 2015: Brittany Beattie; Cycle 10, 2016: Aleyna FitzGerald	Erika Heynatz (cycles 1–2); Jodhi Meares (cycles 3–4) (Note: Charlotte Dawson was hosting the live final of cycle 4 while Jodhi Meares was not present at that event.); Sarah Murdoch (cycles 5–7); Jennifer Hawkins (cycles 8-10)
Austria	Austria's Next Topmodel	Puls 4 (cycles 1–7, 9); ATV (cycle 8)	Cycle 1, 2009: Larissa Marolt; Cycle 2, 2009–2010: Aylin Kösetürk; Cycle 3, 2011: Lydia Obute; Cycle 4, 2012: Antonia Hausmair; Cycle 5, 2013: Greta Uszkai; Cycle 6, 2014: Oliver Stummvoll; Cycle 7, 2015–2016: Fabian Herzgsell; Cycle 8, 2017: Isak Omorodion; Cycle 9, 2019: Taibeh Ahmadi	Lena Gercke (cycles 1–4); Melanie Scheriau (cycles 5–7); Eveline Hall (cycle 8); Franziska Knuppe (cycle 9)
Belgium	Topmodel	2BE	Cycle 1, 2007: Hanne Baekelandt; Cycle 2, 2008: Virginie Bleyaert	Ingrid Seynhaeve (cycle 1); An Lemmens (cycle 2)
Belgium	Belgium's Next Top Model	Streamz	Cycle 1, 2023: Gilles Verbruggen; Cycle 2, 2024: Bréseïs Simons	Hannelore Knuts
Benelux	Benelux' Next Top Model	2BE; RTL 5	Cycle 1, 2009: Rosalinde Kikstra; Cycle 2, 2010: Melissa Baas	Daphne Deckers
Brazil	Brazil's Next Top Model	Sony Entertainment Television	Cycle 1, 2007: Mariana Velho; Cycle 2, 2008: Maíra Vieira; Cycle 3, 2009: Camila Trindade	Fernanda Motta
Cambodia	Cambodia's Next Top Model	MYTV	Cycle 1, 2014–2015: Chan Kongkar	Yok Chenda
Canada	Canada's Next Top Model	City (cycles 1–2); CTV (cycle 3)	Cycle 1, 2006: Andrea Muizelaar; Cycle 2, 2007: Rebecca Hardy; Cycle 3, 2009: Meaghan Waller	Tricia Helfer (cycle 1); Jay Manuel (cycles 2–3)
Caribbean	Caribbean's Next Top Model	CaribVision (cycle 1); Flow TV (cycle 2–4)	Cycle 1, 2013: Treveen Stewart; Cycle 2, 2015: Kittisha Doyle; Cycle 3, 2017: Shamique Simms; Cycle 4, 2018: Le Shae Riley	Wendy Fitzwilliam
China	China's Next Top Model	Sichuan TV (cycles 1–3); Travel Channel (cycle 4); Chongqing TV (cycle 5)	Cycle 1, 2008: Yin Ge; Cycle 2, 2009: Meng Yao; Cycle 3, 2010: Mao Chu Yu; Cycle 4, 2013: Wang Xiao Qian; Cycle 5, 2015: Li Si Jia	Li Ai (cycles 1–3); Shang Wenjie (cycle 4); Lynn Hung & Zhang Liang (cycle 5)
Colombia	Colombia's Next Top Model	Caracol Televisión	Cycle 1, 2013: Mónica Castaño; Cycle 2, 2014: Yuriko Londoño; Cycle 3, 2017: Alejandra Merlano	Carolina Guerra (cycle 1); Carolina Cruz (cycles 2–3)
Croatia	Hrvatski Top Model	RTL	Cycle 1, 2008: Sabina Behlić; Cycle 2, 2010: Rafaela Franić	Tatjana Jurić (cycle 1); Vanja Rupena (cycle 2)
Denmark	Danmarks Næste Topmodel	Kanal 4	Cycle 1, 2010: Caroline Bader; Cycle 2, 2011: Julie Hasselby; Cycle 3, 2012: Line Rehkopff; Cycle 4, 2013: Louise Mikkelsen; Cycle 5, 2014: Sarah Madsen; Cycle 6, 2015: Daniel Madsen	Caroline Fleming (cycles 1–5); Cecilie Lassen (cycle 6)
Estonia	Eesti tippmodell	Kanal 2	Cycle 1, 2012: Helina Metsik; Cycle 2, 2013–2014: Sandra Ude; Cycle 3, 2014–2015: Aule Õun; Cycle 4, 2015–2016: Kätlin Hallik	Kaja Wunder (cycle 1); Liisi Eesmaa (cycle 2–4)
Far East	Asia's Next Top Model	Star World (cycles 1–5); Fox Life (cycle 6)	Cycle 1, 2012–2013: Jessica Amornkuldilok; Cycle 2, 2014: Sheena Liam; Cycle 3, 2015: Ayu Gani; Cycle 4, 2016: Tawan Kedkong; Cycle 5, 2017: Maureen Wroblewitz; Cycle 6, 2018: Dana Slosar	Nadya Hutagalung (cycles 1–2); Georgina Wilson (cycle 3); Cindy Bishop (cycles 4–6)
Finland	Suomen huippumalli haussa	Nelonen (cycles 1–6); MTV3 (cycle 7)	Cycle 1, 2008: Ani Alitalo; Cycle 2, 2009: Nanna Grundfeldt; Cycle 3, 2010: Jenna Kuokkanen; Cycle 4, 2011: Anna-Sofia Ali-Sisto; Cycle 5, 2012: Meri Ikonen; Cycle 6, 2017: Jerry Koivisto; Cycle 7, 2022: Jarrah Kollei	Anne Kukkohovi (cycles 1–5); Maryam Razavin (cycle 6); Veronica Verho (cycle 7)
France	Top Model	M6	Cycle 1, 2005: Alizée Gaillard; Cycle 2, 2007: Karen Pillet	Odile Sarron (cycle 1); Adriana Karembeu (cycle 2)
Georgia	TOP gogo	Rustavi 2	Cycle 1, 2012: Tako Mandaria; Cycle 2, 2013: Alisa Kuzmina	Salome Gviniashvili (cycle 1); Nino Tskitishvili (cycle 2)
Germany	Germany's Next Topmodel	ProSieben	Cycle 1, 2006: Lena Gercke; Cycle 2, 2007: Barbara Meier; Cycle 3, 2008: Jennifer Hof; Cycle 4, 2009: Sara Nuru; Cycle 5, 2010: Alisar Ailabouni; Cycle 6, 2011: Jana Beller; Cycle 7, 2012: Luisa Hartema; Cycle 8, 2013: Lovelyn Enebechi; Cycle 9, 2014: Stefanie Giesinger; Cycle 10, 2015: Vanessa Fuchs; Cycle 11, 2016: Kim Hnizdo; Cycle 12, 2017: Céline Bethmann; Cycle 13, 2018: Toni Dreher-Adenuga; Cycle 14, 2019: Simone Kowalski; Cycle 15, 2020: Jacky Wruck; Cycle 16, 2021: Alex-Mariah Peter; Cycle 17, 2022: Lou-Anne Gleissenebner; Cycle 18, 2023: Vivien Blotzki; Cycle 19, 2024: Jermaine Kokoú Kothé & Lea Oude Engberink; Cycle 20, 2025: Daniela Djokić & Moritz Rüdiger; Cycle 21, 2026: Aurélie Siewitz & Ibo Ouro-Bodi	Heidi Klum (Note: Christian Anwander was hosting the live final of Cycle 15 while Heidi Klum couldn't be there at the live event due to COVID-19 pandemic. Klum appeared remotely from her Los Angeles home.)
Greece	Next Top Model	ANT1	Cycle 1, 2009–2010: Seraina Kazamia; Cycle 2, 2010–2011: Cindy Toli	Vicky Kaya
Greece	Greece's Next Top Model	Star Channel	Cycle 1, 2018: Noune Kazaryan; Cycle 2, 2019: Anna-Maria Iliadou & Katia Tarabanko; Cycle 3, 2020: Hercules Chuzinov; Cycle 4, 2021: Kyvéli Hatziefstratiou; Cycle 5, 2022: Aléksia Trajko; Cycle 6, 2025: Xenia Tsirkova; Cycle 7, 2026: Upcoming season	No Host (cycles 1–6) (Note: The judges also served as hosts during the first six seasons.); Iliana Papageorgiou (cycle 7–present)
Hungary	Topmodell	Viasat 3	Cycle 1, 2006: Réka Nagy	Viktória Vámosi (episodes 1–11); Panni Epres (finale) (Note: Panni Epres replaced Viktória Vámosi for hosting duties at the final of Cycle 1. Eventually, Vámosi was fired before the final.)
Hungary	Next Top Model Hungary	TV2	Cycle 1, 2024: Lili Mészáros	Nóra Ördög
India	India's Next Top Model	MTV India	Cycle 1, 2015: Danielle Canute; Cycle 2, 2016: Pranati Prakash; Cycle 3, 2017: Riya Subodh; Cycle 4, 2018: Urvi Shetty	Lisa Haydon (cycles 1–2); Malaika Arora (cycles 3–4)
India	Top Model India	Colors Infinity	Cycle 1, 2018: Mahir Pandhi	Lisa Haydon
Indonesia	Indonesia's Next Top Model	NET.	Cycle 1, 2020–2021: Ilene Kurniawan; Cycle 2, 2021-2022: Sarah Tumiwa; Cycle 3, 2022-2023: Iko Bustomi	Luna Maya
Israel	הדוגמניות	Channel 10	Cycle 1, 2005: Victoria Katzman; Cycle 2, 2006: Niral Karantinaji; Cycle 3, 2008: Ella Mashkautzen	Galit Gutmann
Italy	Italia's Next Top Model	Sky Uno	Cycle 1, 2007–2008: Gilda Sansone; Cycle 2, 2008: Michela Maggioni; Cycle 3, 2009: Anastasia Silveri; Cycle 4, 2011: Alice Taticchi	Natasha Stefanenko
Kazakhstan	Ya krasivaya	HiT TV	Cycle 1, 2005: Altyn Baekenova	Ilya Urazakov
Malta	Malta's Top Model	Favourite Channel	Cycle 1, 2009: Audrienne Debono	Claire Amato
Mexico	Mexico's Next Top Model	Sony Entertainment Television	Cycle 1, 2009: Mariana Bayón; Cycle 2, 2011: Tracy Reuss; Cycle 3, 2012: Sahily Córdova; Cycle 4, 2013: Paloma Aguilar; Cycle 5, 2014: Vanessa Ponce	Elsa Benítez (cycles 1–3); Jaydy Michel (cycles 4–5)
Mongolia	The Models; Mongolia's Next Top Model (cycles 1-2)	EduTV	Cycle 1, 2017: Tserendolgor Battsengel; Cycle 2, 2018-2019: Anujin Baynerdene; Cycle 3, 2021-2022: Hanna Buyankhishig	Nora Dagva (cycles 1-2); Urantsetseg Ganbold (cycle 3)
The Netherlands	Holland's Next Top Model	RTL 5 (cycles 1-12); Videoland (cycle 13)	Cycle 1, 2006: Sanne Nijhof; Cycle 2, 2007: Kim Feenstra; Cycle 3, 2007: Cecile Sinclair; Cycle 4, 2008: Ananda Lândertine; Cycle 5, 2011: Tamara Weijenberg; Cycle 6, 2013: Nikki Steigenga; Cycle 7, 2014: Nicky Opheij; Cycle 8, 2015: Loiza Lamers; Cycle 9, 2016: Akke Marije Marinus; Cycle 10, 2017: Montell van Leijen; Cycle 11, 2018: Soufyan Gnini; Cycle 12, 2019: Marcus Hansma; Cycle 13, 2022: Lando van der Schee; Cycle 14, 2024: Gitte van Elst	Yfke Sturm (cycles 1–2); Daphne Deckers (cycles 3–5); Anouk Smulders (cycle 6–9); Anna Nooshin (cycle 10-12); Loiza Lamers (cycle 13-)
New Zealand	New Zealand's Next Top Model	TV3	Cycle 1, 2009: Christobelle Grierson-Ryrie; Cycle 2, 2010: Danielle Hayes; Cycle 3, 2011: Brigette Thomas	Sara Tetro
Norway	Top Model Norge; Top Model (cycles 1–4)	TV3	Cycle 1, 2006: Maria Eilertsen; Cycle 2, 2007: Kamilla Alnes; Cycle 3, 2008: Martine Lervik; Cycle 4, 2011: Claudia Bull; Cycle 5, 2013: Frida Solaker	Kathrine Sørland (cycle 1); Vendela Kirsebom (cycles 2–3); Mona Grudt (cycle 4); Siri Tollerød (cycle 5)
Peru	Peru's Next Top Model	Andina de Televisión	Cycle 1, 2013: Danea Panta	Valeria De Santis
Philippines	Philippines' Next Top Model	RPN (cycle 1); TV5 (cycle 2)	Cycle 1, 2007: Grendel Alvarado; Cycle 2, 2017: Angela Lehmann	Ruffa Gutierrez (cycle 1); Maggie Wilson (cycle 2)
Poland	Top Model; Top Model. Zostań modelką (cycles 1–3)	TVN	Cycle 1, 2010: Paulina Papierska; Cycle 2, 2011: Olga Kaczyńska; Cycle 3, 2013: Zuza Kołodziejczyk; Cycle 4, 2014: Osi Ugonoh; Cycle 5, 2015: Radek Pestka; Cycle 6, 2016: Patryk Grudowicz; Cycle 7, 2018: Kasia Szklarczyk; Cycle 8, 2019: Dawid Woskanian; Cycle 9, 2020: Mikołaj Śmieszek; Cycle 10, 2021: Dominika Wysocka; Cycle 11, 2022: Klaudia Nieścior; Cycle 12, 2023: Dominik Szymański; Cycle 13, 2024: Klaudia Zioberczyk; Cycle 14, 2025: Michał Kot	Joanna Krupa
Romania	Next Top Model by Cătălin Botezatu	Antena 1	Cycle 1, 2011: Emma Dumitrescu; Cycle 2, 2011: Laura Giurcanu; Cycle 3, 2012: Ramona Popescu	Cătălin Botezatu
Russia	Ty - supermodel	STS	Cycle 1, 2004: Ksenia Kahnovich; Cycle 2, 2005: Svetlana Sergienko; Cycle 3, 2006: Tatyana Pekurovskaya; Cycle 4, 2007: Tatyana Krokhina	Fedor Bondarchuk (cycles 1–2); Alexander Tsekalo (cycle 3); Svetlana Bondarchuk (cycle 4)
Russia	Top Model po-russki	Muz-TV (cycles 1–3); You-TV (cycles 4–5)	Cycle 1, 2011: Mariya Lesovaya; Cycle 2, 2011: Katya Bagrova; Cycle 3, 2012: Tanya Kozuto; Cycle 4, 2012: Yulya Farkhutdinova; Cycle 5, 2014: Evgeniya Nekrasova	Ksenia Sobchak (cycles 1–3); Irina Shayk (cycle 4); Natasha Stefanenko (cycle 5)
Russia	Ty - Topmodel	TNT	Cycle 1, 2021: Tina Tova	Anastasia Reshetova
Scandinavia	Top Model	TV3	Cycle 1, 2005: Kine Bakke; Cycle 2, 2005: Frøydis Elvenes; Cycle 3, 2006: Freja Borchies	Georgianna Robertson (cycle 1); Cynthia Garrett (cycles 2–3); Anne Pedersen; Mini Andén (cycles 1–2); Malin Persson (cycle 3); Kathrine Sørland
Scandinavia	Top Model Curves	TV3	Cycle 1, 2016: Ronja Manfredsson	Lina Rafn; Janka Polliani; Jonas Hallberg
Serbia	Srpski Top Model	Prva	Cycle 1, 2011: Neda Stojanović	Ivana Stanković
Slovakia	Hľadá sa Supermodelka	TV JOJ	Cycle 1, 2007: Ivana Honzová	Michal Hudák & Simona Krainova
Slovenia	Slovenski Top Model	TV3 Slovenia	Cycle 1, 2010: Maja Fučak	Nuša Šenk
South Korea	Korea's Next Top Model	On Style Media	Cycle 1, 2010: Lee Jimin; Cycle 2, 2011: Jin Jung-sun; Cycle 3, 2012: Choi So-ra; Cycle 4, 2013: Shin Hyun-ji; Cycle 5, 2014: Hwang Kibbeum	Jang Yoon-ju
Sweden	Top Model Sverige; Top Model (cycle 1)	TV3	Cycle 1, 2007: Hawa Ahmed; Cycle 2, 2012: Alice Herbst; Cycle 3, 2013: Josefin Gustafsson; Cycle 4, 2014: Feben Negash	Vendela Kirsebom (cycle 1); Izabella Scorupco (cycle 2); Caroline Winberg (cycles 3–4)
Switzerland	Switzerland's Next Topmodel	Puls 8 ProSieben Schweiz	Cycle 1, 2018: Saviour Anosike; Cycle 2, 2019: Gaby Gisler; Cycle 3, 2021: Dennis de Vree	Manuela Frey
Taiwan	Taiwan Supermodel No. 1	TVBS Entertainment Channel	Cycle 1, 2007: He Wan Ting; Cycle 2, 2008: Chen Chu Xiang	Bianca Bai; Kevin Tsai
Thailand	Thailand's Next Top Model	Channel 3	Cycle 1, 2005: You Kheawchaum	Sonia Couling
Turkey	Top Model Türkiye	Star TV	Cycle 1, 2006: Selda Car	Deniz Akkaya
Ukraine	Top Model po-ukrainsky Supermodel po-ukrainsky (cycles 1–3)	Novy TV	Cycle 1, 2014: Alyona Ruban; Cycle 2, 2015: Alina Panyuta; Cycle 3, 2016: Masha Hrebenyuk; Cycle 4, 2017: Samvel Tumanyan; Cycle 5, 2018: Yana Kutishevskaya; Cycle 6, 2019: Malvina Chuklya; Cycle 7, 2020: Tanya Bryk	Alla Kostromichova
United Kingdom & Ireland	Britain's Next Top Model; Britain & Ireland's Next Top Model (cycles 7–9)	Sky Living (cycles 1–9); Lifetime (cycles 10–12)	Cycle 1, 2005: Lucy Ratcliffe; Cycle 2, 2006: Lianna Fowler; Cycle 3, 2007: Lauren McAvoy; Cycle 4, 2008: Alex Evans; Cycle 5, 2009: Mecia Simson; Cycle 6, 2010: Tiffany Pisani; Cycle 7, 2011: Jade Thompson; Cycle 8, 2012: Letitia Herod; Cycle 9, 2013: Lauren Lambert; Cycle 10, 2016: Chloe Keenan; Cycle 11, 2017: Olivia Wardell; Cycle 12, 2017: Ivy Watson	Lisa Butcher (cycle 1); Lisa Snowdon (cycles 2–5); Elle Macpherson (cycles 6–9) (Note: Dave Berry was hosting the live final of Cycle 6 while Elle Macpherson was leading the judging panel.); Abbey Clancy (cycles 10–12) (Note: Cindy Bishop took over the shows hosting duties during the last three episodes of cycle 12, which were filmed overseas in Thailand. Abbey Clancy took a leave of absence from the series after learning she was pregnant.)
United States	America's Next Top Model	UPN (cycles 1–6); The CW (cycles 7–22); VH1 (cycles 23–24)	Cycle 1, 2003: Adrianne Curry; Cycle 2, 2004: Yoanna House; Cycle 3, 2004: Eva Pigford; Cycle 4, 2005: Naima Mora; Cycle 5, 2005: Nicole Linkletter; Cycle 6, 2006: Danielle Evans; Cycle 7, 2006: CariDee English; Cycle 8, 2007: Jaslene Gonzalez; Cycle 9, 2007: Saleisha Stowers; Cycle 10, 2008: Whitney Thompson; Cycle 11, 2008: McKey Sullivan; Cycle 12, 2009: Teyona Anderson; Cycle 13, 2009: Nicole Fox; Cycle 14, 2010: Krista White; Cycle 15, 2010: Ann Ward; Cycle 16, 2011: Brittani Kline; Cycle 17, 2011: Lisa D'Amato; Cycle 18, 2012: Sophie Sumner; Cycle 19, 2012: Laura James; Cycle 20, 2013: Jourdan Miller; Cycle 21, 2014: Keith Carlos; Cycle 22, 2015: Nyle DiMarco; Cycle 23, 2016–2017: India Gants; Cycle 24, 2018: Kyla Coleman	Tyra Banks (cycles 1–22, 24); Rita Ora (cycle 23)
Vietnam	Vietnam's Next Top Model	VTV3	Cycle 1, 2010–2011: Khiếu Thị Huyền Trang; Cycle 2, 2011–2012: Hoàng Thùy; Cycle 3, 2012: Mai Thị Giang; Cycle 4, 2013: Mâu Thị Thanh Thủy; Cycle 5, 2014–2015: Tạ Quang Hùng & Nguyễn Thị Oanh; Cycle 6, 2015: Nguyễn Thị Hương Ly; Cycle 7, 2016: Nguyễn Thị Ngọc Châu; Cycle 8, 2017: Lê Thị Kim Dung; Cycle 9, 2025: Lại Mai Hoa	Vũ Nguyễn Hà Anh (cycle 1) (Note: The series kicked off with an unclear host/head judge position at which Elizabeth Thủy Tiên was initially offered the ultimate power in judges' table and then Nathan Lee fought against her to become another male host of the worldwide Top Model franchise. They were both fired and Vũ Nguyễn Hà Anh was chosen as a replacement. Vũ Anh Tuấn was hosting the live final while the head judge was leading the panel.); Nguyễn Xuân Lan(cycles 2–3, 5); Trương Ngọc Ánh (cycle 8); Phạm Thị Thanh Hằng (cycles 4, 6–7, 9)

Table notes:

== The Traitors ==
Legend:

Currently airing
Upcoming seasons
Awaiting confirmation
No longer in production

Country/Region	Local title	Network	Winners	Host(s)
Argentina	TBA	Telefe	Season 1, 2026: Announced	Nicolás Occhiato
Australia	The Traitors	Network 10	Season 1, 2022: Alex Duggan (Traitor); Season 2, 2023: No winner (Note: While there were three Traitors who made it to the final round, they subsequently lost the prize money after the "Traitor's Dilemma."); Season 3, 2026: Kirby Bentley; Season 4, 2027: Upcoming season	Current; Gretel Killeen (3–present); Former; Rodger Corser (1–2)
Belgium	De Verraders (Flemish)	VTM	Season 1, 2022: Bart Kaëll, Kim Van Oncen, Niels Albert and Ward Lemmelijn (Faithfuls); Season 2, 2023: Bart Appeltans and Guy T'Sjoen (Traitors); Season 3, 2024: Roman Van Houtven, Sean Dhondt and William Boeva (Traitors); Season 4, 2025: Charlotte Sieben, Eliyha Altena and Yannick Noben (Faithfuls); Season 5, 2026: Current season	Staf Coppens
Belgium	Les Traîtres (French)	RTL-TVI	Season 1, 2021–22: Philippe Scofield and Pholien Systermans (Faithfuls); Season 2, 2023: Vanessa Matagne (Traitor); Season 3, 2024: Toma Nikiforov (Traitor)	Frédéric Etherlinck
Brazil	TBA	Universal+	Season 1, TBA: Announced	TBA
Bulgaria	Traitors: Igra na predateli (Traitors: Игра на предатели)	bTV	Season 1, 2025: Daniel Petkanov, Eva Veselinova, Georgi Kodzhabashev and Gloria Petkova (Faithfuls); Season 2, 2026: Current season	Vladimir Karamazov
Canada	The Traitors Canada (English)	CTV	Season 1, 2023: Mike D'Urzo (Traitor); Season 2, 2024: Neda Kalantar (Traitor); Season 3, 2025: Dom Gabriel and Hollywood Jade (Faithfuls); Season 4, 2026: Current season	Karine Vanasse
Canada	Les Traîtres (French)	Noovo	Season 1, 2024: Cédric Fofana, Chelsea Jones and Kim Hardy (Faithfuls); Season 2, 2025: Audrey Morissette and Kaven Daigle (Faithfuls); Season 3, 2026: Élaine Savard and Jacob Grégoire (Faithfuls); Season 4, 2027: Upcoming season	Karine Vanasse
Croatia	TBA	RTL	Season 1, TBC: Announced	TBA
Czech Republic	Zrádci	Prima	Season 1, 2024: Nicole Šáchová (Traitor); Season 2, 2025: Věra Kirchnerová (Traitor); Season 3, 2026: Current season	Vojtěch Kotek
Denmark	Forræder	TV2	Season 1, 2023: Johannes Nymark (Traitor); Season 2, 2024: Emil Trier, Mikkel Trier and Melissa Bentsen (Faithfuls); Season 3, 2025: Ali Jassem and Nicky Andersen (Faithfuls); Season 4, 2026: Noah Umur Kanber and Soeren Le Schmidt (Traitors)	Lise Rønne
Denmark	Forræder - Ukendt Grund	TV2	Season 1, 2024: Marc Karaket Bach Nielsen (Traitor); Season 2, 2025: Andreas Brodersen, Charlotte Stang and Sherica Zimmermann Fernand (Faithfuls); Season 3, 2026: Emil Husth Marling, Kim Oechsle, Mallu Olivia Cortney Damgaard (Traitors); Season 4, 2027: Upcoming season	Martin Johannes Larsen
Estonia	Reeturid	Kanal 2	Season 1, 2026: Current season	Urmas Vaino
Finland	Petolliset	Nelonen	Season 1, 2023: Heikki Sorsa and Sita Salminen (Traitors); Season 2, 2024: Fatim Diarra, Miisa Nuorgam and Rami Shikeben (Faithfuls); Season 3, 2025: Janne Grönroos, Marjo Toskala and Tiina Forsby (Traitors); Season 4, 2025: Sofia Zida and Susanna Penttilä (Faithfuls); Season 5, 2026: Jasmiina Yildiz and Joona Hellman (Traitors); Season 6, 2026: Current season	Christoffer Strandberg
France	Les Traîtres	M6	Season 1, 2022: Clémence Castel and David Douillet (Traitors); Season 2, 2023: Juju Fitcats (Traitor); Season 3, 2024: Hugo Manos and Laurent Ruquier (Traitors); Season 4, 2025: Adil Rami (Traitor); Season 5, 2025: Christine Bravo, Marlène Schiappa and Théo Fernandez (Faithfuls); Season 6, 2026: Adriana Karembeu and Issa Doumbia (Traitors); Season 7, 2026: Upcoming season	Éric Antoine
France	Les Traîtres: Nouvelle Génération	M6	Season 1, 2024: Andy Raconte, Briac Glaud and Romain Goisbeau (Faithfuls)	Éric Antoine
Germany	Die Verräter – Vertraue Niemandem!	RTL	Season 1, 2023: Anna-Carina Woitschack and Vincent Gross (Traitors); Season 2, 2024: Jessica Haller and Oana Nechiti (Traitors); Season 3, 2025: Charlotte Würdig, Mirja du Mont and Motsi Mabuse (Traitors); Season 4, 2026: Ann-Kathrin Bendixen and Peyman Amin (Faithfuls); Season 5, 2027: Upcoming season	
Greece	Οι Προδότες	ANT1	Season 1, 2023: Giorgos Talias (Traitor)	Konstantinos Markoulakis
Hungary	Az Árulók – Gyilkosság a kastélyban	RTL	Season 1, 2023: Ágnes Szabados, Orsi Tapasztó and Tamás Mohai (Faithfuls); Season 2, 2024: Enikő Muri, Izabell Url and Krisztina Hadas (Faithfuls); Season 3, 2024: Gáspár Róka (Traitor); Season 4, 2025: Barbara Schoblocher and Sándor Torghelle (Faithfuls); Season 5, 2026: Piréz Sapkás and Vivien Vasvári (Traitors); Season 6, 2027: Upcoming Season	Attila Árpa
India	The Traitors	Prime Video	Season 1, 2025: Nikita Luther and Urfi Javed (Faithfuls); Season 2, 2026: Krystle D'Souza and Rida Tharana (Traitors)	Karan Johar
India	The Traitors Telugu	Prime Video	Season 1, 2026: Shravya Varma and Sweekar Agasthi (Traitors)	Teja Sajja
Ireland	The Traitors Ireland	RTÉ One	Series 1, 2025: Kelley Higgins, Oyin Adeyemi and Vanessa Ogbonna (Faithfuls); Series 2, 2026: Diego Caixeta and Anna Murphy (Faithfuls); Series 3, 2027: Upcoming Season	Siobhán McSweeney
Israel	הבוגדים (Habogdim)	Channel 12	Season 1, 2025: Ronnie Insaz (Traitor)	Assi Azar and Rotem Sela
Italy	The Traitors Italia	Prime Video	Season 1, 2025: Giuseppe Giofrè (Traitor); Season 2, 2026: Current season	Alessia Marcuzzi
Indonesia	TBA	KlikFilm	Season 1, TBC: Upcoming season	TBA
Malta	The Traitors Malta	TVM	Season 1, 2027: Upcoming season	TBA
Mexico	TBA	Universal+	Season 1, TBA: Upcoming season	TBA
Mongolia	TBA	Edutainment TV	Season 1, TBD: Upcoming season	TBA
Netherlands	De Verraders	RTL 4	Season 1, 2021: Chatilla van Grinsven (Faithful) and Samantha Steenwijk (Traitor); Season 2, 2022: Dionne Slagter, Steven Brunswijk and Toine van Peperstraten (Faithfuls); Season 3, 2023: Billy Dans, Chahid Charrak and Noor Omrani (Faithfuls); Season 4, 2024: Tristan Eisank (Traitor); Season 5, 2025: Christiaan Bauer and Julia Heetman (Faithfuls); Season 6, 2026: Géza Weisz & Robert van Hemert (Traitors); Season 7, 2027: Upcoming season	Tijl Beckand
Netherlands	De Verraders	Videoland	Videoland Edition, 2021: Britt Scholte and Iliass Ojja (Traitors); Halloween Season 1, 2022: Bastiaan Ragas, Bobbi Eden and Famke Louise (Faithfuls); Halloween Season 2, 2023: Bente Fokkens (Traitor); Halloween Season 3, 2024: Niels Oosthoek (Traitor)	Art Rooijakkers (Videoland Edition); Frank Evenblij (Halloween)
New Zealand	The Traitors NZ	Three	Season 1, 2023: Anna Reeve and Sam Smith (Faithfuls); Season 2, 2024: Bailey Kench (Traitor); Season 3, 2026: Chloe Withrington (Traitor)	Current; Madeleine Sami (3–); Former; Paul Henry(1–2)
Norway	Forræder	TV2	Season 1, 2022: Cathrine Fossum and Karina Hollekim (Traitors); Season 2, 2023: Aslak Maurstad (Traitor); Season 3, 2023: Jon Martin Henriksen and Marlene Stavrum (Faithfuls); Season 4, 2024: Gaute Berg Næss (Traitor); Season 5, 2025: Espen Abrahamsen and Rasmus Wold (Traitors); Season 6, 2026: Christoffer Falleth, Javad El Bakali, Julie Thorsen, Kjetil André Aamodt (Faithfuls)	Mads Hansen
Poland	The Traitors. Zdrajcy	TVN	Season 1, 2024: Justyna Kąkol and Stanley Olatunji Ayọmo (Faithfuls); Season 2, 2025: Małgorzata Marczulewska, Grzegorz Raubo and Tomasz Świtała (Traitors); Season 3, 2026: Iza Chojnacka and Wojtek Matuszak (Traitors); Season 4, 2027: Upcoming season	Malwina Wędzikowska
Portugal	Os Traidores	SIC	Season 1, 2023: Carolina de Brito Palma and Júlio Ferreira (Traitors)	Daniela Ruah
Romania	Trădătorii	Pro TV	Season 1, 2025: Ines Stana (Traitor)	Ana Ularu
Russia unlicensed	Мастер игры (Gamemaster)	TNT	Season 1, 2025: Denis Vlasenko and Svetlana Romashina (Faithfuls); Season 2, 2026: Alina Astrovskaya (Traitor); Season 3, 2027: Upcoming season	Yuri Kolokolnikov; Vadim Demchog
Saudi Arabia	TBA	TBA	Season 1, TBC: Upcoming season	TBA
Serbia	The Traitors Srbija	Prva TV	Season 1, 2026: Current season Season 2, 2027: Upcoming season	Jelena Gavrilović
Slovakia	Zradcovia	TV JOJ	Season 1, 2027: Upcoming season	TBA
South Africa	TBA	TBA	Season 1, TBC: Upcoming season	TBA
South Korea	TBA	TBA	Season 1, 2026: Upcoming season	Cha Seung-Won
Spain	Traitors España	Antena 3	Season 1, 2023: Joana Pastrana and Leo Margets (Faithfuls); Season 2, 2025: Charo González and Juan Ferrer (Faithfuls)	Current; Juanra Bonet (2-); Former; Sergio Peris-Mencheta (1)
Sweden	Förrädarna	TV4	Season 1, 2023: Katia Mosally (Traitor); Season 2, 2024: Kelda Stagg, Nadim Ghazale and Thomas Bodström (Traitors); Season 3, 2025: Kaeli Abdi and Samir Badran (Faithfuls); Season 4, 2025: Ahmed Berhan (Traitor); Season 5, 2026: Patrik Norqvist (Traitor); Season 6, 2026: Current Season	Dragomir Mrsic
Turkey	The Traitors Türkiye	Prime Video; Kanal D	Season 1, 2026: Emir Elidemir, Özgür Balakar and Saadet Özsırkıntı (Traitors); Season 2, 2027: Upcoming season	Giray Altınok
Ukraine	Зрадники (Zradnyky)	Sweet.tv	Season 1, 2025: Anastasiya Bychkova (Traitor); Season 2, 2026: Current season	Oleksiy Gnatkovskiy
United Kingdom	The Traitors	BBC One	Series 1, 2022: Aaron Evans, Hannah Byczkowski and Meryl Williams (Faithfuls); Series 2, 2024: Harry Clark (Traitor); Series 3, 2025: Jake Brown and Leanne Quigley (Faithfuls); Series 4, 2026: Rachel Duffy and Stephen Libby (Traitors); Series 5, 2027: Upcoming season Series 6, 2028: Upcoming season Series 7, 2029: Upcoming season Series 8, 2030: Upcoming season	Claudia Winkleman
United Kingdom	The Celebrity Traitors	BBC One	Series 1, 2025: Alan Carr (Traitor); Series 2, 2026: Romesh Ranganathan and Sebastian Croft (Faithfuls)	Claudia Winkleman
United States	The Traitors (Celebrity Edition) (Note: The first season had a mix of celebrities and civilians)	Peacock	Season 1, 2023: Cirie Fields (Traitor); Season 2, 2024: Chris Tamburello and Trishelle Cannatella (Faithfuls); Season 3, 2025: Dolores Catania, Dylan Efron, Gabby Windey and Ivar Mountbatten (Faithfuls); Season 4, Winter 2026: Rob Rausch (Traitor); Season 6, 2027: Upcoming season	Alan Cumming
United States	The Traitors: New Blood (Civilian Edition)	Peacock; NBC	Season 5, Fall 2026: Current season	Alan Cumming

== The Voice ==
Franchise with a currently airing season
Franchise with an upcoming season
Franchise with an unknown status
Franchise that has ceased to air
Franchise that was cancelled during production

Alphabet

The Voice versions around the world
Country/Region	Local title	Network	Winners	Coaches	Hosts
Afghanistan	آواز افغانستان; The Voice of Afghanistan	Tolo TV	Season 1, 2013: Jawed Yosufi; Season 2, 2014: Najibullah Shirzad	Aryana Sayeed (1); Qais Ulfat (1–2); Nazir Khara (1–2); Obaid Juenda (1–2); Fereshta Samah (2)	Ahmad Popal (1); Omid Nezami (2); Kadija Sadat (backstage, 1–2)
Africa	The Voice Africa	Airtel TV	Season 1, 2023–24: Cancelled	Yemi Alade; Awilo Longomba; Lady Jaydee; Locko	Gaetano Kagwa; Dakore Egbuson-Akande
Africa Françafrique	Current; The Voice – Plus qu'une voix (5–); The Voice – More than a voice Former; The Voice Afrique Francophone (1–4)	Current; Canal+ Afrique (5–); Former; VoxAfrica (1–4)	Season 1, 2016–17: Pamela Baketana; Season 2, 2017–18: Victoire Biaku; Season 3, 2020–21: Lady Shine; Season 4, 2024: Vova Music; Season 5, 2026: Saara Houansou	Current; Josey (4–); Franglish (5–); Emma'a (5–); Meiway (5–); Former; A'salfo (1–2)^{20}; Singuila (1–2); Nayanka Bell (3)^{20}; Lokua Kanza (1–3); Charlotte Dipanda (1–3)^{20}; Hiro Le Coq (3); Mix Premier (4); Didi B (4); O’Nel Mala (4); Guest coaches; Josey (2, live shows)^{20}; Youssoupha (2–3, live shows)^{20}	Current; Jean Michel Onnin (5–); Former; Claudy Siar (1–3); Yves Zogbo Jr. (4)
Africa Françafrique	The Voice Kids	Current; Canal+ Afrique (5–); Former; VoxAfrica (1–4)	Season 1, 2022: Myriam Obama	Daphne; Sidiki Diabaté; Teeyah; KS Bloom ^{7}	Willy Dumbo
Albania; Kosovo	The Voice of Albania^{1}	Top Channel; Website	Season 1, 2011–12: Rina Bilurdagu; Season 2, 2012–13: Venera Lumani; Season 3, 2013–14: Florent Abrashi; Season 4, 2014–15: Aslaidon Zaimaj; Season 5, 2016: Tiri Gjoci; Season 6, 2017: Klinti Çollaku	Miriam Cani (1–2); Elton Deda (1–3); Aurela Gaçe (3); Elsa Lila (4); Alma Bektashi (1–5); Sidrit Bejleri (1–5); Genc Salihu (4–5); Jonida Maliqi (5); Alban Skënderaj (6); Besa Kokëdhima (6); Rona Nishliu (6); Xuxi (6)	Ledion Liço (1–6); Marina Vjollca (backstage, 1); Kiara Tito (backstage, 5); Mishel Rrena (backstage, 5); Fjoralba Ponari (backstage, 6)
Albania; Kosovo	The Voice Kids	Top Channel; Website	Season 1, 2013: Rita Thaqi; Season 2, 2018: Denis Bonjaku; Season 3, 2019: Altea Ali	Alma Bektashi (1); Altin Goci (1); Elton Deda (1); Eneda Tarifa (2); Aleksandër & Renis Gjoka (duo, 2–3); Miriam Cani (2–3); Arilena Ara (3)	Xhemi Shehu (1); Ledion Liço (2); Dojna Mema (backstage, 2; main, 3); Flori Gjini (backstage, 3)
Angola; Mozambique	The Voice Angola^{5}	Dstv	Season 1, 2015–16: Mariedne Feliciano	Dji Tafinha; Paulo Flores; Yola Semedo; Walter Ananaz	Dinamene Cruz; Weza Solange (backstage)
Arab World	The Voice – أحلى صوت; The Voice – Best Voice	MBC1; LBCI; Website	Season 1, 2012: Mourad Bouriki; Season 2, 2013–14: Sattar Saad; Season 3, 2015: Nedaa Sharara; Season 4, 2018: Dumooa Tahseen; Season 5, 2019: Mahdi Ayachi; Season 6, 2025–26: Joudy Shahen^{33}	Current; Nassif Zeytoun (6–); Rahma Riad (6–); Ahmed Saad (6–); Former; Sherine (1–3); Saber Rebaï (1–3); Kazem al-Saher (1–3); Assi El Helani (1–4); Ahlam (4–5); Elissa (4); Mohamed Hamaki (4–5); Samira Said (5); Ragheb Alama (5)	Current; Yaser Al Sakkaf (backstage, 5, main 6–); Former; Arwa Goudeh (1–2); Mohammad Kareem (1–2); Aimée Sayah (3); Nardine Farag (4–5); Nadine Njeim (backstage, 1–2); Moamen Nour (backstage, 3); Badr Al Zaidan (backstage, 4)
Arab World	The Voice Kids – أحلى صوت; The Voice Kids – Best Voice	MBC1; LBCI; Website	Season 1, 2016: Lynn Hayek; Season 2, 2017–18: Hamza Labyad; Season 3, 2020: Mohamad Islam Rmeih; Season 4, 2026: Lama Qais	Current; Ramy Sabry (4–); Dalia Mubarak (4–); Al Shami (4–); Former; Tamer Hosny (1–2); Kazem al-Saher (1–2); Nancy Ajram (1–3); Assi El Helani (3); Mohamed Hamaki (3)	Current; Andria Tayeh (4–); Former; Aimée Sayah (1); Moamen Nour (1); Nardine Farag (2–3); Badr Al Zaidan (2–3)
Arab World	The Voice Senior – أحلى صوت; The Voice Senior – Best Voice	MBC1; LBCI; Website	Season 1, 2020: Abdou Yaghi	Melhem Zein; Samira Said; Najwa Karam; Hany Shaker^{†}	Annabella Hilal
Argentina	La Voz Argentina; The Voice Argentina^{18}	Telefe; Website	Season 1, 2012: Gustavo Corvalán; Season 2, 2018: Braulio Assanelli; Season 3, 2021: Francisco Benitez; Season 4, 2022: Yhosva Montoya; Season 5, 2025: Nicolás Behringer	Current; Soledad Pastorutti; Lali Espósito (3–); Miranda! (duo, 1, 5–); Luck Ra (5–); Karina la Princesita (comeback stage, 5–); Former; El Puma (1); Axel (1–2); Tini Stoessel (2); Ricardo Montaner (2–4); Mau y Ricky (duo, 3–4); Comeback Stage; Emilia Mernes (comeback stage, 3)^{19}; MYA (duo, comeback stage, 4)^{19}	Current; Nico Occhiato (5–); Former; Marley; Luli Fernández (backstage, 1); Candelaria Molfese (digital host, 2); Stefi Roitman (digital host, 3); Rocío Igarzábal (digital host, 4)
Armenia	Հայաստանի ձայնը The Voice of Armenia	Armenia TV	Season 1, 2012–13: Meri "Masha" Mnjoyan; Season 2, 2013: Ana Khanchalyan; Season 3, 2014: Raisa Avanessian; Season 4, 2017: Hayk Ghulyan	Tata Simonyan (1); Arto Tunçboyaciyan (1); Christine Pepelyan (2); Michael Poghosyan (2); Shushan Petrosyan (2); Hayko^{†} (2–3); Sona (1, 3); Armen Martirosyan (3); Eva Rivas (3); Sofi Mkheyan (1, 4); Aramé (4); Nune Yesayan (4); Sevak Khanagyan (4)	Rafael Ghazaryan (1–3); Nazeni Hovhannisyan (1–4); Ara Kazaryan (4); Hakob Hakobyan (backstage, 1–3); Hrach Muradyan (backstage, 1–3)
Australia	The Voice	Current; Seven Network (10–); Former; Nine Network (1–9)	Season 1, 2012: Karise Eden; Season 2, 2013: Harrison Craig; Season 3, 2014: Anja Nissen; Season 4, 2015: Ellie Drennan; Season 5, 2016: Alfie Arcuri; Season 6, 2017: Judah Kelly; Season 7, 2018: Sam Perry; Season 8, 2019: Diana Rouvas; Season 9, 2020: Chris Sebastian; Season 10, 2021: Bella Taylor Smith; Season 11, 2022: Lachie Gill; Season 12, 2023: Tarryn Stokes; Season 13, 2024: Reuben De Melo; Season 14, 2025: Alyssa Delpopolo; Season 15, 2026: Yung Milla	Joel Madden (solo^{6}, 1–3); will.i.am (3); Kylie Minogue (3); Ricky Martin (2–4); Jessie J (4–5); Joel & Benji Madden (duo^{6}, 4–5); Seal (1–2, 6); Joe Jonas (7); Delta Goodrem (1–2, 4–9); Boy George (6–9); Kelly Rowland (6–9); Keith Urban (1, 10–11); Jessica Mauboy (10–12); Rita Ora (10–12); Jason Derulo (12); Guy Sebastian (8–13); LeAnn Rimes (13); Adam Lambert (13); Kate Miller-Heidke (13–15); Ronan Keating (5, 14–15); Richard Marx (14–15); Melanie C (14–15); Tones and I (second chance, 15)^{19}	Darren McMullen (1–4, 9); Renee Bargh (9); Sonia Kruger (4–8, 10–15); Faustina Agolley (backstage, 1–2)
Australia	The Voice Kids	Nine Network	Season 1, 2014: Alexa Curtis	Delta Goodrem; Mel B; Joel & Benji Madden (duo)	Darren McMullen; Prinnie Stevens (backstage)
Australia	The Voice Generations^{30} Original	Seven Network	Season 1, 2022: Caitlin & Tim Rizzoli	Guy Sebastian; Keith Urban; Jessica Mauboy; Rita Ora	Sonia Kruger
Azerbaijan	Səs Azərbaycan; The Voice of Azerbaijan	Current itv (2–)^{24} Former; AzTV (1)	Season 1, 2015–16: Emiliya Yaqubova; Season 2, 2021–22: Nadir Rustamli; Season 3, 2025: Jamila Hashimova	Current; Murad Arif (2–); Eldar Gasimov (2–); Zulfiyya Khanbabayeva (3–); Röya Aykhan (3–); Former; Faiq Ağayev (1); Mübariz Tağiyev (1); Manana Japaridze (1); Tünzalə Ağayeva (1–2); Brilliant Dadashova (2)	Current; Azer Suleymanli (2–); Former; Tural Asadov (1)
Azerbaijan	Səs Uşaqlar; The Voice Kids Azerbaijan	itv^{24}	Season 1, 2020–21: Amina Hajiyeva	Chingiz Mustafayev; Zulfiyya Khanbabayeva; Murad Arif	Leyla Quliyeva
Azerbaijan	Səs Azərbaycan. Doğma Nəğmələr; The Voice of Azerbaijan. Native Songs; Original	itv^{24}	Season 1, 2023: Zulfu Asadzade	Gulyaz Memmedova; Ilqar Xeyal; Samira Aliyeva	Azer Suleymanli
Belgium; Flanders; Wallonia	The Voice van Vlaanderen (Dutch); The Voice of Flanders	vtm Website	Season 1, 2011–12: Glenn Claes; Season 2, 2013: Paulien Mathues; Season 3, 2014: Tom De Man; Season 4, 2016: Lola Obasuyi; Season 5, 2017: Luka Cruysberghs; Season 6, 2019: Ibe Wuyts; Season 7, 2021: Grace Khuabi; Season 8, 2022: Louise Goedefroy; Season 9, 2024: Christophe Verholle; Season 10, 2026: Bas Serra; Season 11, 2027: Upcoming season	Current; Koen Wauters; Mathieu Terryn (8–); Laura Tesoro (10–); Joost Klein (10–); Maarten & Dorothee (duo, comeback stage 10–)^{19}; Former; Jasper Steverlinck (1–2); Axelle Red (3); Regi Penxten (3); Bent Van Looy (3–4); Alex Callier (1–2, 5–6); Bart Peeters (4–6); Tourist LeMC (7); Niels Destadsbader (7); Natalia (1–2, 4–9); Jan Paternoster (8–9); Comeback Stage; Laura Tesoro (comeback stage, 7–9)^{19}	Current; An Lemmens; Aster Nzeyimana (9–); Former; Sean Dhondt (1–3, 5–7); Aaron Blommaert (8); Sam De Bruyn (backstage, 4)
Belgium; Flanders; Wallonia	The Voice Kids (Dutch)	vtm Website	Season 1, 2014: Mentissa Aziza; Season 2, 2015–16: Jens Dolleslagers; Season 3, 2017: Katarina Pohlodkova; Season 4, 2018: Jade De Rijcke; Season 5, 2020: Gala Aliaj; Season 6, 2022: Karista Khan; Season 7, 2023: Sikudhani Mbugua; Season 8, 2026: Upcoming season; Season 9, 2028: Upcoming season	Current; Metejoor (6–); Camille Dhont (8–); Maksim Stojanac (8–); Thibault Christiaensen (8–); Former; Regi Penxten (1); Natalia (1–2); Slongs Dievanongs (2); Josje Huisman (3); Sean Dhondt (1–5); Gers Pardoel (4–5); K3 (trio, 4–6)^{17}; Duncan Laurence (6); Laura Tesoro (3–7); Coely (7); Pommelien Thijs (7)	Current; Nora Gharib (7–); Aaron Blommaert (7–); Former; An Lemmens (1–6); Koen Wauters (6); Kürt Rogiers (backstage, 1–3); Sieg De Doncker (backstage, 4–5); Maksim Stojanac (backstage, 6)
Belgium; Flanders; Wallonia	The Voice Senior(Dutch)	vtm Website	Season 1, 2018: John Leo; Season 2, 2020: Roland Van Beeck	Helmut Lotti (1); Dana Winner (1); Natalia (1); Walter Grootaers (1–2); Sam Gooris (2); Karen Damen (2); André Hazes Jr. (2)	An Lemmens
Belgium; Flanders; Wallonia	The Voice Belgique(French); The Voice Belgium	La Une; VivaCité; Website	Season 1, 2011–12: Roberto Bellarosa; Season 2, 2013: David Madi; Season 3, 2014: Laurent Pagna; Season 4, 2015: Florent Brack; Season 5, 2016: Laura Cartesiani; Season 6, 2017: Théophile Rénier; Season 7, 2018: Valentine Brognion; Season 8, 2019: Charlotte Foret; Season 9, 2020–21: Jérémie Makiese; Season 10, 2021–22: Alec Golard; Season 11, 2024: Emma Sorgato; Season 12, 2026: Clément Chevalier	Current; Christophe Willem (10–); Loïc Nottet (9, 12–); Axelle Red (12–); Hoshi (12–); Former; Lio (1); Joshua (duo, 1); Natasha St-Pier (2–3); Bastian Baker (3); Jali (4); Chimène Badi (4); Stanislas (4–5); Cats on Trees (duo, 5); Quentin Mosimann (1–2, 5–6); Marc Pinilla (2–3, 6); Bigflo & Oli (duo, 6); Vitaa (7–8); Slimane (7–8); Matthew Irons (7–8); Henri PFR (9); Typh Barrow (8–10); Black M (10); BJ Scott (1–7, 9–11); Hatik (11); Mentissa Aziza (11)	Current; Jérémie Baise (12–); Former; Maureen Louys (1–11); Adrien Devyver (backstage, 1–3); Walid (backstage, 4–6); Cécile Djunga (backstage, 7); Fanny Jandrain (Blind auditions and Knockouts: 10)
Belgium; Flanders; Wallonia	The Voice Kids Belgique(French); The Voice Kids Belgium	La Une; VivaCité; Website	Season 1, 2020: Océana Siciliano; Season 2, 2023: Elena Kabongo; Season 3, 2025: Ilena Vigna; Season 4, 2027: Upcoming season	Current; Alice on the Roof (2–); Joseph Kamel (3–); Lorie (4–); Mentissa Aziza (4–)^{7}; Former; Vitaa (1); Slimane (1); Black M (2); Matthew Irons (1–3); Typh Barrow (2–3)	Current; Fanny Jandrain (3–); Robin Soysa (backstage, 3–); Former; Maureen Louys (1–2); Prezzy (backstage, 1); Luana Fontana (backstage, 2)
Brazil	The Voice Brasil	Current; SBT (13–); Former; TV Globo (1–12)	Season 1, 2012: Ellen Oléria; Season 2, 2013: Sam Alves; Season 3, 2014: Danilo Reis & Rafael; Season 4, 2015: Renato Vianna; Season 5, 2016: Mylena Jardim; Season 6, 2017: Samantha Ayara; Season 7, 2018: Léo Pain; Season 8, 2019: Tony Gordon; Season 9, 2020: Victor Alves; Season 10, 2021: Giuliano Eriston; Season 11, 2022: Keilla Júnia; Season 12, 2023: Ivan Barreto; Season 13, 2025: Thiago Garcia; Season 14, 2026: Current season; Season 15, 2027: Upcoming season	Current; Matheus & Kauan (duo, 13–); Lauana Prado (14–); Paulo Ricardo (14–); Diogo Nogueira (14–); Priscilla (battles, 14–); Former; Daniel (1–3); Ivete Sangalo (6–8); Claudia Leitte (1–5, 10); Gaby Amarantos (11); Carlinhos Brown (1–7, 9–10, 12); Michel Teló (4–9, 11–12)^{19}; Iza (8–12); Lulu Santos (1–12); Duda Beat (13); Péricles (13); Mumuzinho (13); Comeback Stage; Michel Teló (comeback stage, 10)^{19}; Guest coach; Mumuzinho (blind auditions, 12)	Current; Tiago Leifert (1–10, 13–); Gaby Cabrini (backstage 13–); Former; André Marques (10); Fátima Bernardes (11–12); Miá Mello (backstage, 2); Fernanda Souza (backstage, 3); Daniele Suzuki (backstage, 1, 4); Mariana Rios (backstage, 5–7); Jeniffer Nascimento (backstage, 8–10); Thaís Fersoza (backstage, 11)
Brazil	The Voice Kids	TV Globo	Season 1, 2016: Wagner Barreto; Season 2, 2017: Thomas Machado; Season 3, 2018: Eduarda Brasil; Season 4, 2019: Jeremias Reis; Season 5, 2020: Kaue Penna; Season 6, 2021: Gustavo Bardim; Season 7, 2022: Isis Testa; Season 8, 2023: Henrique Lima	Ivete Sangalo (1–2); Victor & Leo (duo, 1–2); Claudia Leitte (3–5); Simone & Simaria (duo, 3–5); Gaby Amarantos (6); Michel Teló (6–7); Maiara & Maraisa (duo, 7); Carlinhos Brown (1–8); Iza (8); Mumuzinho (8); Guest coaches; Mumuzinho (live shows, 5); Toni Garrido (showdowns, 7)	Tiago Leifert (1); André Marques (2–5); Márcio Garcia (6–7); Fátima Bernardes (8); Kika Martinez (backstage, 1); Thalita Rebouças (backstage, 2–7)
Brazil	The Voice +	TV Globo	Season 1, 2021: Zé Alexanddre; Season 2, 2022: Vera de Maria Maga	Claudia Leitte (1); Daniel (1); Mumuzinho (1); Ludmilla (1–2); Fafá de Belém (2); Carlinhos Brown (2); Toni Garrido (2)	André Marques (1–2); Thalita Rebouças (backstage, 1); Thaís Fersoza (backstage, 2)
Bulgaria	Гласът на България; The Voice of Bulgaria	bTV; Website	Season 1, 2011: Steliyana Hristova; Season 2, 2013: Ivailo Donkov; Season 3, 2014: Kristina Ivanova; Season 4, 2017: Radko Petkov; Season 5, 2018: Nia Petrova; Season 6, 2019: Atanas Kateliev; Season 7, 2020: Georgi Shopov; Season 8, 2021: Petya Paneva; Season 9, 2022: Jacklyn Tarrakci; Season 10, 2023: Nadezhda Kovacheva; Season 11, 2024: Slaveya Ivanova; Season 12, 2026: Current season	Current; Ivan Lechev (4–); Dara (8–); Maria Ilieva (10–); Medi (12–); Former; Ivana (1); Mariana Popova (1); Kiril Marichkov^{†} (1); Preslava (2); Yordan Karadjov (2); Victoria Terziyska (2); Desi Slava (3); Atanas Penev (3); Orlin Goranov (3); Poli Genova (4–5); Kamelia (4–7); Mihaela Fileva (6–7); Galena (8–9); Lubo Kirov (8–9); Miro (1–3, 10); Grafa (4–7, 11)	Current; Vladimir Zombori (11–); Boryana Bratoeva (11–); Former; Victoria Terziyska (main, 1; Live shows, 3); Marten Roberto (Live shows, 1; main, 2–3); Yana Marinova (Live shows, 2); Pavell (4–7); Venci Venc' (4–7); Ivan Tishev (8–10); Emanuela Ivanova (online backstage, 1–3); Gencho «NJOY» Genchev (TV backstage, 1); Todor Georgiev-Toshey (online backstage, 4–5); Elina Markovska (online backstage, 6); Aleksandra Bogdanska (online backstage, 7–8); Preyah (online backstage, 9); Petya Dikova (online backstage, 11)
Cambodia	The Voice Cambodia	Hang Meas HDTV	Season 1, 2014: Buth Seiha; Season 2, 2016: Thel Thai; Season 3, 2023: Lim Serey HanNika	Pich Sophea; Chhorn Sovannareach; Aok Sokunkanha; Nop Bayyareth	Chan Keonimol; Chea Vibol (1–2); Rasy Sok (3)
Cambodia	The Voice Kids Cambodia	Hang Meas HDTV	Season 1, 2017: Pich Thai; Season 2, 2018: Tep Piseth; Season 3, 2022: Sarum Panhasak	Aok Sokunkanha (1–3); Preap Sovath (1–2); Sokun Nisa (1, 3); Sous Visa (2); Zono (3)	Chea Vibol; Kong Socheat
Cambodia	The Voice Teens Cambodia	Hang Meas HDTV	Season 1, 2026: New series	TBA	TBA
Canada; Quebec	La Voix^{3} (French); The Voice	TVA	Season 1, 2013: Valérie Carpentier; Season 2, 2014: Yoan Garneau; Season 3, 2015: Kevin Bazinet; Season 4, 2016: Stéphanie St-Jean; Season 5, 2017: Ludovick Bourgeois; Season 6, 2018: Yama Laurent; Season 7, 2019: Geneviève Jodoin; Season 8, 2020: Josiane Comeau; Season 9, 2023: Sophie Grenier; Season 10, 2024: Maude Cyr-Deschênes; Season 11, 2026: Rosemarie Boivin	Current; Corneille (9–); Mario Pelchat (9–); Roxane Bruneau (comeback stage, 9; 10–)^{19}; France D'Amour (10–); Former; Marie-Mai (1); Jean-Pierre Ferland^{†} (1); Louis-Jean Cormier (2); Ariane Moffatt (1, 4); Isabelle Boulay (2–3, 5); Éric Lapointe (2–7); Lara Fabian (6–7); Alex Nevsky (6–7); Julien Clerc (supercoach, 7); Ginette Reno (supercoach, 8); Pierre Lapointe (3–5, 8); Garou (6, 8); Cœur de pirate (8); Marc Dupré (1–5, 7–9); Marjo (9)	Charles Lafortune
Canada; Quebec	La Voix Junior (French); The Voice Junior	TVA	Season 1, 2016: Charles Kardos; Season 2, 2017: Sydney Lallier	Marie-Mai (1–2); Marc Dupré (1–2); Alex Nevsky (1–2)	Charles Lafortune
Chile	The Voice Chile	Canal 13 (1–2); Chilevisión (3–4)	Season 1, 2015: Luis Pedraza; Season 2, 2016: Javiera Flores; Season 3, 2022: Pablo Rojas; Season 4, 2023: Hadonais Nieves	Franco Simone (1); Nicole (1–2); Luis Fonsi (1–2); Álvaro López (1–2); Ana Torroja (2); Yuri (3); Gente de Zona (duo, 3); Cami (3); Beto Cuevas (3–4); Francisca Valenzuela (4); El Puma (4); Prince Royce (4); Comeback Stage; Gepe (comeback stage, 3)^{19}; Daniela Castillo (comeback stage, 4)^{19}	Sergio Lagos (1–2); Jean Philippe Cretton (1–2); Julian Elfenbein (3–4); Diana Bolocco (4); Emilia Daiber (online host, 3–4)
China (Mandarin)	The Voice of China – 中国好声音; The Voice of China – Best Voice of China	Zhejiang TV	Season 1, 2012: Liang Bo; Season 2, 2013: Li Qi; Season 3, 2014: Zhang Bichen; Season 4, 2015: Zhang Lei	Liu Huan^{†} (1); A-mei (2); Yang Kun (1, 3); Chyi Chin (3); Na Ying (1–4); Wang Feng (2–4); Harlem Yu (1–2, 4); Jay Chou (4)	Hu Qiaohua
Colombia	La Voz Colombia; The Voice Colombia	Caracol Televisión	Season 1, 2012: Miranda; Season 2, 2013: Camilo Martínez	Carlos Vives (1); Fanny Lú (1–2); Andrés Cepeda (1–2); Ricardo Montaner (1–2); Gilberto Santa Rosa (2)	Linda Palma (1–2); Alejandro Palacio (1–2); Carlos Ponce (1); Diego Sae3nz (backstage, 1–2)
Colombia	La Voz Kids; The Voice Kids	Caracol Televisión	Season 1, 2014: Ivanna García; Season 2, 2015: Luis Mario Torres; Season 3, 2018: Juan Sebastian Laverde; Season 4, 2019: Anabelle Campaña; Season 5, 2021: Maria Liz; Season 6, 2022: Diana Camila; Season 7, 2024: Carranga Kids	Current; Andrés Cepeda; Greeicy (7–); Aleks Syntek (7–); Former; Maluma (1–2); Fanny Lú (1–4); Sebastián Yatra (3–4); Natalia Jiménez (5); Jesús Navarro (5); Kany García (6); Nacho (6)	Current; Iván Lalinde (6–); Laura Tobón (3–5, 7–); Former; Linda Palma (1–2); Alejandro Palacio (1–4); Laura Acuña (5–6)
Colombia	La Voz Teens; The Voice Teens; Original	Caracol Televisión	Season 1, 2016: Carol Mendoza	Gusi (1); Gloria Martínez (1); Andrés Cepeda (1)	Laura Tobón (1); Karen Martínez (1); Catalina Uribe (backstage, 1)
Colombia	La Voz Senior; The Voice Senior	Caracol Televisión	Season 1, 2021: Maria Nelfi Duque; Season 2, 2022: Chencho Trejos	Current; Andrés Cepeda; Kany García (2–); Nacho (2–); Former; Natalia Jiménez (1); Jesús Navarro (1)	Current; Laura Acuña; Iván Lalinde (2–); Former; Laura Tobón (1)
Croatia	Current; The Voice Hrvatska(3–); The Voice of Croatia; Former; The Voice – Najljepši glas Hrvatske (1–2); The Voice – The Most Beautiful Voice of Croatia	HRT 1 Website	Season 1, 2015: Nina Kraljić; Season 2, 2016: Ruža Janjiš; Season 3, 2019–20: Vinko Ćemeraš; Season 4, 2023–24: Martin Kosovec; Season 5, 2026: Upcoming season	Current; Vanna (3–); Davor Gobac (3–); Dino Jelusick (4–); Damir Urban (4–); Former; Tony Cetinski (1–2); Indira Levak (1–2); Jacques Houdek (1–2); Ivan Dečak (1–3); Massimo Savić^{†} (3)	Iva Šulentić; Ivan Vukušić
Croatia	The Voice Kids	HRT 1 Website	Season 1, 2024–25: Marino Vrgoč; Season 2, 2025–26: Nikol Kutnjak	Vanna; Davor Gobac; Mia Dimšić; Marko Tolja	Iva Šulentić; Ivan Vukušić
Czech Republic & Slovakia	Hlas Česko Slovenska (1–2); The Voice of Czecho Slovakia; The Voice Česko Slovensko(3)	TV Nova; Website; Markíza; Website	Season 1, 2012: Ivanna Bagová; Season 2, 2014: Lenka Hrůzová; Season 3, 2019: Annamária d'Almeida	Rytmus (1); Dara Rolins (solo, 1); Michal David (1–2); Majk Spirit (2); Dara Rolins & Marta Jandová (duo, 2); Josef Vojtek (1–3); Kali (3); Vojtěch Dyk (3); Jana Kirschner (3)	Leoš Mareš (1–2); Tereza Kerndlová (3); Mária Čírová (3); Tina (backstage, 1–2)
Denmark; Faroe Islands; Greenland	Voice – Danmarks største stemme Voice – The Biggest Voice of Denmark^{16}	TV 2	Season 1, 2011–12: Kim Wagner; Season 2, 2012: Emilie Paevatalu	L.O.C. (1–2); Sharin Foo (1–2); Lene Nystrøm (1–2); Steen Jørgensen (1); Xander (2)	Morten Resen (1); Felix Smith (2); Sigurd Kongshøj Larsen (backstage, 1)
Denmark; Faroe Islands; Greenland	Voice Junior	TV 2 (1–5); Kanal 5 (6); Website	Season 1, Spring 2014: Melina Neustrup Nielsen; Season 2, Fall 2014: Aland Mustafa; Season 3, 2015: Isabel Brogaard; Season 4, 2016: Oliver Arndt; Season 5, 2017: Dafne Stilund Nielsen; Season 6, 2019: Camille Haven Beck	Oh Land (1–5); Wafande (1–6); Joey Moe (1–6); Mette Lindberg (6)	Mikkel Kryger (1–5); Emilie Paevatalu (1–2); Amelia Høy (3–4); Stephania Potalivo (5); Ihan Hayder (6); Jacob Riising (6)
Dominican Republic	The Voice Dominicana	Telesistema 11	Season 1, 2021: Yohan Amparo; Season 2, 2022: Adriana Green-Ortiz	Juan Magán (1); Nacho (1); Milly Quezada (1–2); Musicologo The Libro (1–2); Eddy Herrera (2); Alex Matos (2)	Luz García (1–2); Jhoel López (1–2)
Ecuador	La Voz Ecuador; The Voice Ecuador	Teleamazonas; Website	Season 1, 2015: Gustavo Vicuña; Season 2, 2016: Antonio Guerrero	Jerry Rivera (1); Marta Sánchez (1); Jorge Villamizar (1); Daniel Betancourth (1–2); Américo (2); Paty Cantú (2); Joey Montana (2)	Carlos Luís Andrade (1–2); Constanza Baez (1); Andrea Hurtado (2)
Estonia	The Voice Eesti; The Voice Estonia	TV3	Season 1, 2027: New series	TBA	Tõnis Niinemets
Finland	The Voice of Finland	Nelonen	Season 1, 2011–12: Mikko Sipola; Season 2, 2013: Antti Railio; Season 3, 2014: Siru Airistola; Season 4, 2015: Miia Kosunen; Season 5, 2016: Suvi Åkerman; Season 6, 2017: Saija Saarnisto; Season 7, 2018: Jerkka Virtanen; Season 8, 2019: Markus Salo; Season 9, 2020: Juffi Seponpoika; Season 10, 2021: Kalle Virtanen; Season 11, 2022: Sussu Erkinheimo; Season 12, 2023: Onni Kivipelto; Season 13, 2024: Laura Ruusumaa; Season 14, 2025: Oliver Rosenholm; Season 15, 2026: Jose Carlos; Season 16, 2027: Upcoming season	Current; Elastinen (1–3, 12–); Sanni (13–); Jenni Vartiainen (15–); Sipe Santapukki (solo, 16–); Former; Lauri Tähkä (1–2); Paula Koivuniemi (1–2); Mira Luoti (3); Anne Mattila (3); Tarja Turunen (4–5); Michael Monroe (1–6); Olli Lindholm^{†} (4–8); Toni Wirtanen (solo, 7–8); Redrama (4–10); Juha Tapio (9–11); Anna Puu (6–9, 11–12); Toni Wirtanen & Sipe Santapukki (duo, 9–12); Maija Vilkkumaa (10–14); Arttu Wiskari (13–15); Comeback Stage; Paradise Mikko (comeback stage, 10)^{19}	Current; Heikki Paasonen (5–); Jaana Pelkonen (backstage, 13–); Former; Axl Smith (1–4); Kristiina Komulainen (backstage, 1); Tea Khalifa (backstage, 2); Jenni Alexandrova (backstage, 3–5); Sami Kuronen (knockouts, 11); Elina Kottonen (backstage, 7–12)
Finland	The Voice Kids	Nelonen	Season 1, 2013: Molly Rosenström; Season 2, 2014: Aino Morko	Krista Siegfrids (1–2); Elastinen (1); Mira Luoti (1); Arttu Wiskari (2); Diandra Flores (2)	Axl Smith (1–2); Tea Khalifa (1–2)
Finland	The Voice All Stars^{29}	Nelonen	Season 1, 2021: Andrea Brosio	Elastinen; Tarja Turunen; Michael Monroe	Heikki Paasonen
Finland	The Voice Senior	Nelonen	Season 1, 2022: Jaska Mäkynen	Michael Monroe; Tarja Turunen; Ressu Redford	Heikki Paasonen; Elina Kottonen
France	The Voice – La plus belle voix^{12} The Voice – The Most Beautiful Voice	TF1; Website	Season 1, 2012: Stéphan Rizon; Season 2, 2013: Yoann Fréget; Season 3, 2014: Kendji Girac; Season 4, 2015: Lilian Renaud; Season 5, 2016: Slimane Nebchi; Season 6, 2017: Lisandro Cuxi; Season 7, 2018: Maëlle Pistoia; Season 8, 2019: Whitney Marin; Season 9, 2020: Abi Bernadoth; Season 10, 2021: Marghe Davico; Season 11, 2022: Nour Brousse; Season 12, 2023: Aurélien Vivos; Season 13, 2024: Alphonse; Season 14, 2025: Il Cello; Season 15, 2026: Lady O; Season 16, 2027: Upcoming season	Current; Tayc (15–); Mika (3–8, 13, 16–); Marine (16–); Suzane (16–); Former; Louis Bertignac (1–2); Garou (1–3, 5); Matt Pokora (6); Soprano (8); Julien Clerc (8); Jenifer (1–4, 8); Pascal Obispo (7, 9); Marc Lavoine (9–11); Zazie (4–7, 12–13); Bigflo & Oli (duo, 12–13); Vianney (10–14); Zaz (14); Patricia Kaas (14); Florent Pagny (1–7, 10–11, 14–15); Amel Bent (9–12, 15); Lara Fabian (9, 15); Comeback Stage; Nolwenn Leroy (comeback stage, 11); Camille Lellouche (comeback stage, 13)^{19}	Current; Nikos Aliagas; Anaïs Grangerac (backstage 14–); Former; Virginie de Clausade (backstage, 1); Karine Ferri (backstage, 2–10)
France	The Voice Kids	TF1; Website	Season 1, 2014: Carla Georges; Season 2, 2015: Jane Constance; Season 3, 2016: Manuela Diaz; Season 4, 2017: Angélina Nava; Season 5, 2018: Emma Cerchi; Season 6, 2019: Soan Arhimann; Season 7, 2020: Rébecca Sayaque; Season 8, 2022: Raynaud Sadon; Season 9, 2023: Durel Loumouamou; Season 10, 2024: Tim; Season 11, 2025: Charlotte Deseigne; Season 12, 2026: Nelson Charles; Season 13, 2027: Upcoming season	Current; Patrick Fiori (2–); Soprano (5–7, 11–); Matt Pokora (3–4, 11–); Santa (11–); Former; Garou (1); Louis Bertignac (1–2); Amel Bent (5–6); Jenifer (1–7); Louane (8); Julien Doré (8); Kendji Girac (7–9); Nolwenn Leroy (9); Slimane (9–10); Claudio Capéo (10); Lara Fabian (10)	Current; Nikos Aliagas; Styleto (12–); Former; Karine Ferri (1–11)
France	The Voice : All-Stars^{29} Original	TF1; Website	Season 1, 2021: Anne Sila	Florent Pagny; Mika; Zazie; Jenifer; Patrick Fiori	Nikos Aliagas; Karine Ferri
Georgia	ახალი ქართული ხმა (1–2); New Georgian Voice; The Voice საქართველო(3–); The Voice Georgia	Imedi TV (1–3); 1tv (4–)	Season 1, 2012–13: Salome Katamadze; Season 2, 2013–14: Mariam Chachkhiani; Season 3, 2015–16: Giorgi Nadibaidze; Season 4, 2021: Magda Ivanishvili; Season 5, 2022–23: Iru Khechanovi; Season 6, 2026–27: Upcoming season	Current; Dato Porchkhidze (1–2, 5–); Sopho Khalvashi (6–); Giorgi Datiashvili (6–)^{33}; Former; Nino Chkheidze (1); Merab Sepashvili (1); Maia Darsmelidze & Stephane Mgebrishvili (duo, 1); Lela Tsurtsumia (2); Maia Darsmelidze (solo, 2); Keti Topuria (3); Anri Jokhadze (3); Nodiko Tatishvili (3); Nutsa Shanshiashvili (3); Niaz Diasamidze (4); Salome Korkotashvili (4); Nikoloz Rachveli (4); Stephane Mgebrishvili (solo, 2, 4–5); Sopho Toroshelidze (5); Dato Evgenidze (5)	Current; TBA (6–); Former; Duta Skhirtladze (1–3); Anna Imedashvili (1–3); Ruska Makashvili (4); Gvantsa Daraselia (5)
Georgia	ახალი საბავშო ხმა New Kids Voice	Imedi TV	Season 1, 2013: Reziko Didebashvili	Eka Kakhiani (1); Dato Porchkhidze (1); Stephane Mgebrishvili (1)	Samory Balde (1); Ruska Makashvili (1)
Germany	The Voice of Germany	ProSieben; Sat.1; Website	Season 1, 2011–12: Ivy Quainoo; Season 2, 2012: Nick Howard; Season 3, 2013: Andreas Kümmert; Season 4, 2014: Charley Ann Schmutzler; Season 5, 2015: Jamie-Lee Kriewitz; Season 6, 2016: Tay Schmedtmann; Season 7, 2017: Natia Todua; Season 8, 2018: Samuel Rösch; Season 9, 2019: Claudia Emmanuela Santoso; Season 10, 2020: Paula Dalla Corte; Season 11, 2021: Sebastian Krenz; Season 12, 2022: Anny Ogrezeanu; Season 13, 2023: Malou Lovis Kreyelkamp; Season 14, 2024: Jennifer Lynn; Season 15, 2025: Anne Mosters; Season 16, 2026: Current season; Season 17, 2027: Upcoming season	Current; Rea Garvey (solo, 1–2, 4–5, 9, 12, 15–); Michi Beck & Smudo (duo, 4–8, 15–); Nico Santos (10–11, 15–); Shirin David (13, 15–); Former; Xavier Naidoo (1–2); The BossHoss (duo, 1–3); Nena (1–3); Max Herre (3); Andreas Bourani (5–6); Michael Patrick Kelly (8); Sido (9); Alice Merton (9); Samu Haber & Rea Garvey (duo, 10); Yvonne Catterfeld & Stefanie Kloß (duo, 10); Sarah Connor (11); Johannes Oerding (11); Stefanie Kloß (solo, 4–5, 12); Peter Maffay (12); Giovanni Zarrella (13); Bill Kaulitz & Tom Kaulitz (duo, 13); Ronan Keating (13); Samu Haber (solo, 3–4, 6–7, 14); Mark Forster (7–12, 14); Yvonne Catterfeld (solo, 6–8, 14); Kamrad (14); Comeback Stage; Nico Santos (comeback stage, 9)^{19}; Michael Schulte (comeback stage, 10)^{19}; Elif Demirezer (comeback stage, 11)^{19}; Calum Scott (comeback stage, 15)^{19}	Current; Melissa Khalaj (11–); Matthias Killing (16–); Former; Stefan Gödde (1); Thore Schölermann (2–15); Annemarie Carpendale (10); Lena Gercke (5–11); Steven Gätjen (11); Doris Golpashin (backstage, 1–4)
Germany	The Voice Kids	Sat.1; Website	Season 1, 2013: Michèle Bircher; Season 2, 2014: Danyiom Mesmer; Season 3, 2015: Noah-Levi Korth; Season 4, 2016: Lukas Janisch; Season 5, 2017: Sofie Thomas; Season 6, 2018: Anisa Celik; Season 7, 2019: Mimi & Josy; Season 8, 2020: Lisa-Marie Ramm; Season 9, 2021: Egon Werler; Season 10, 2022: Georgia Balke; Season 11, 2023: Emma Filipović; Season 12, 2024: Jakob Hebgen; Season 13, 2025: Neo Klingl; Season 14, 2026: Katelyn Harrington; Season 15, 2027: Upcoming season	Current; Álvaro Soler (9–12, 14–); HE/RO (duo, 14–); Leony (14–); Michael Patrick Kelly (14–)^{7}; Former; Tim Bendzko (1); Henning Wehland (1–2); Johannes Strate (2–3); Nena & Larissa Kerner (duo, 5–6); Mark Forster (3–7); The BossHoss (duo, 7); Sasha Schmitz (4–5, 8); Max Giesinger (6, 8); Deine Freunde (duo, 8); Michi Beck & Smudo (duo, 9–12); Lena Meyer-Landrut (1–4, 7–8, 10–12); Wincent Weiss (9–13); Stefanie Kloß (7, 9, 13); Ayliva (13); Clueso (13)	Current; Andrea Kaiser (15–); Former; Thore Schölermann (1–13); Chantal Janzen (3–4); Debbie Schippers (5–6); Melissa Khalaj (7–14); Aline von Drateln (backstage, 1); Nela Lee (backstage, 2); Marc van Velzen (backstage-online, 1–3); Noah-Levi Korth (backstage-online, 4); Jonas Ems (backstage-online, 5); Iggi Kelly (backstage-online, 7); Mimi & Josy (backstage-online, 8); Keanu Rapp (backstage-online, 9–10); Egon Werler (backstage-online, 10); Chiara Castelli (backstage-online, 11–12)
Germany	The Voice Senior	Sat.1; Website	Season 1, 2018–19: Dan Lucas; Season 2, 2019: Monika Smets	Mark Forster (1); Sasha Schmitz (1–2); The BossHoss (duo, 1–2); Yvonne Catterfeld (1–2); Michael Patrick Kelly (2)	Lena Gercke (1–2); Thore Schölermann (1–2)
Germany	The Voice Rap^{32}	ProSieben; Joyn	Season 1, 2023: Leon "Ezo" Weick	Kool Savas; Dardan	Thore Schölermann
Greece; Cyprus	The Voice of Greece^{4}	Current; Skai TV (3–); Sigma TV (3–); Former; ANT1 (1–2)	Season 1, 2014: Maria Elena Kiriakou; Season 2, 2015: Kostas Ageris; Season 3, 2016–17: Giannis Margaris; Season 4, 2017: Yiorgos Zioris; Season 5, 2018: Lemonia Beza; Season 6, 2019: Dimitris Karagiannis; Season 7, 2020–21: Ioanna Georgakopoulou; Season 8, 2021: Anna Argyrou; Season 9, 2022–23: Maria Sakellari; Season 10, 2024–25: Sofia Chistoforidou; Season 11, 2025: Konstantinos Komodromos; Season 12, 2026–27: Current season	Current; Panos Mouzourakis (3–); Helena Paparizou (3–); Christos Mastoras (10–); Paola (12–); Former; Antonis Remos (1–2); Despina Vandi (1–2); Melina Aslanidou (1–2); Michalis Kouinelis (1–2); Kostis Maraveyas (3–5); Eleonora Zouganeli (6–7); Sakis Rouvas (3–9); Konstantinos Argyros (8–9); Giorgos Mazonakis† (10–11)	Current; Giorgos Lianos (6–9, 12–); Former; Giorgos Liagkas (1–2); Doukissa Nomikou (7); Fay Skorda (9); Giorgos Kapoutzidis (3–5, 10–11); Themis Georgantas (backstage, 1–2); Elena Tsagrinou (backstage, 3); Christina Bompa (backstage, 6); Laura Narjes (backstage, 4–5, 7); Valia Hatzitheodwrou (backstage, 8–9)
Greece; Cyprus	The Voice Kids	ANT1	2014–15: Cancelled	—N/a	—N/a
Hungary	The Voice – Magyarország hangja (1); The Voice – Voice of Hungary; The Voice Magyarország (2); The Voice of Hungary	TV2 (1); RTL (2)	Season 1, 2012–13: Dénes Pál; Season 2, 2023: Erika Szakács	Mihály Mező (1); Tamás Somló^{†} (1); Andrea Malek (1); "Caramel" Ferenc Molnár (1); Curtis (2); Erika Miklósa (2); Nóra Trokán (2); Manuel (2)	Tamás Szabó Kimmel (1); Bence Istenes (2); Miklós Bányai (backstage, 1)
Iceland	The Voice Ísland; The Voice Iceland	Sjónvarp Símans	Season 1, 2015: Hjörtur Traustason; Season 2, 2016–17: Karitas Harpa Davíðsdóttir	Helgi Björnsson (1–2); Salka Sól Eyfeld (1–2); Svala Björgvinsdóttir (1–2); Unnsteinn Manuel Stefánsson (1–2)	Sigvaldi Kaldalóns (1–2); Svavar Örn Svavarsson (1–2)
India	The Voice India^{21}	&TV (1–2); StarPlus (3)	Season 1, 2015: Pawandeep Rajan; Season 2, 2016–17: Farhan Sabir; Season 3, 2019: Sumit Saini	Shaan (1–2); Mika Singh (1); Sunidhi Chauhan (1); Himesh Reshammiya (1); Neeti Mohan (2); Benny Dayal (2); Salim Merchant (2); Adnan Sami (3); Armaan Malik (3); Kanika Kapoor (3); Harshdeep Kaur (3); A. R. Rahman (3, supercoach)	Karan Tacker (1); Sugandha Mishra (2); Divyanka Tripathi (3)
India	The Voice India Kids	&TV; Website	Season 1, 2016: Nishtha Sharma; Season 2, 2017–18: Manashi Saharia	Neeti Mohan (1); Shekhar Ravjiani (1); Shaan (1–2); Papon (2); Palak Muchhal (2); Himesh Reshammiya (2)	Jay Bhanushali (1–2); Sugandha Mishra (1–2)
Indonesia	The Voice Indonesia^{23}	Indosiar (1); RCTI (2); GTV (3–4); Website	Season 1, 2013: Billy Simpson; Season 2, 2016: Mario G. Klau; Season 3, 2018–19: Ronaldo Longa; Season 4, 2019: Vionita Veronika	Sherina Munaf (1); Glenn Fredly^{†} (1); Giring Ganesha (1); Ari Lasso (2); Agnez Mo (2); Kaka (2); Judika (2); Anggun (3); Armand Maulana (1, 3–4); Titi DJ (3–4); Vidi Aldiano^{†} & Nino Baskoro (duo, 3–4); Isyana Sarasvati (4); Comeback Stage; Gamaliel Tapiheru (comeback stage, 4)	Darius Sinathriya (1); Daniel Mananta (2); Ananda Omesh (3–4); Fenita Arie (backstage, 1); Conchita Caroline (backstage, 1); Astrid Tiar (backstage, 3); Gracia Indri (backstage, 4)
Indonesia	The Voice Kids Indonesia	GTV; Website	Season 1, 2016: Christopher Edgar; Season 2, 2017: Sharla Martiza; Season 3, 2018: Keva Hamzah; Season 4, 2021: Nikita Mawarni	Bebi Romeo (1–2); Muhammad Tulus (1–2); Agnez Mo (1–3); Kaka (3); Marcell Siahaan (3–4); Isyana Sarasvati (4); Yura Yunita & Rizky Febian (duo, 4)	Ananda Omesh; Dian Ayu Lestari (backstage, 3); Ersa Mayori (backstage, 1–2, 4); Kaneishia Yusuf (online, 2); Kimberley Fransa (online, 3); Okky Lukman (guest, 4)
Indonesia	The Voice All Stars	GTV; Website	Season 1, 2022: Jogi Simanjuntak	Armand Maulana; Titi DJ; Vidi Aldiano^{†} & Nino Baskoro (duo); Isyana Sarasvati	Robby Purba
Iran	The Voice Persia	MBC Persia	Season 1, 2023: Amin Yahyazadeh	Bijan Mortazavi; Leila Forouhar; Sogand Soheili; Kamyar	Hamed Nikpay
Ireland	The Voice of Ireland	RTÉ One	Season 1, 2012: Pat Byrne; Season 2, 2013: Keith Hanley; Season 3, 2014: Brendan McCahey; Season 4, 2015: Patrick Donoghue; Season 5, 2016: Michael Lawson	Brian Kennedy (1); Sharon Corr (1–2); Jamelia (2–3); Dolores O'Riordan^{†} (3); Kian Egan (1–5); Bressie (1–5); Rachel Stevens (4–5); Una Healy (4–5)	Kathryn Thomas (1–5); Eoghan McDermott (1–5)
Israel	The Voice ישראל; The Voice Israel	Channel 13; Reshet; Website	Season 1, 2012: Kathleen Reiter; Season 2, 2012–13: Lina Makhul; Season 3, 2014: Elkana Marziano; Season 4, 2016–17: Sapir Saban; Season 5, 2019: Amit Shauli; Season 6, 2026: Emma Ziza Cohen	Current; Noa Kirel (6–); Idan Raichel (6–); Eden Ben Zaken (6–); Static (6–); Former; Rami Kleinstein (1); Yuval Banay & Shlomi Bracha (duo, 2); Sarit Hadad (1–3); Mosh Ben-Ari (3); Miri Mesika (4); Avraham Tal (4); Aviv Geffen (1–4); Shlomi Shabat (solo, 1–4); Ivri Lider (5); Nasreen Qadri (5); Doron Medalie (5); Shlomi Shabat & Yuval Dayan (duo, 5)	Current; Michael Aloni; Former; Shlomit Malka (4); Sivan Klein (backstage, 1); Mor Silver (backstage, 1–3)
Israel	The Voice All Stars	Channel 13; Reshet; Website	Season 1, 2026: Daniel Barzilay	Noa Kirel; Idan Raichel; Eden Ben Zaken; Static	Michael Aloni
Italy	The Voice of Italy^{11}	Rai 2 Rai HD; Website	Season 1, 2013: Elhaida Dani; Season 2, 2014: Suor Cristina Scuccia; Season 3, 2015: Fabio Curto; Season 4, 2016: Alice Paba; Season 5, 2018: Maryam Tancredi; Season 6, 2019: Carmen Pierri	Riccardo Cocciante (1); Noemi (1–3); Piero Pelù (1–3); Roby & Francesco Facchinetti (duo, 3); Raffaella Carrà^{†} (1–2, 4); Dolcenera (4); Emis Killa (4); Max Pezzali (4); J-Ax (2–3, 5); Al Bano (5); Cristina Scabbia (5); Francesco Renga (5); Morgan (6); Gué Pequeno (6); Elettra Lamborghini (6); Gigi D'Alessio (6)	Fabio Troiano (1); Federico Russo (2–4); Costantino della Gherardesca (5); Simona Ventura (6); Carolina Di Domenico (backstage, 1); Valentina Correani (backstage, 2–3); Alessandra Angeli (backstage, 4)
Italy	The Voice Senior	Rai 1	Season 1, 2020: Erminio Sinni; Season 2, 2021–22: Annibale Giannarelli; Season 3, 2023: Maria Teresa Reale; Season 4, 2024: Diana Puddu; Season 5, Spring 2025: Patrizia Conte; Season 6, Fall 2025: Francesco De Siena; Season 7, 2026: Current season	Current; Arisa (4–); Clementino & Rocco Hunt (duo, 6–); Nek (6–); Fiorella Mannoia (7–); Former; Al Bano & Jasmine Carrisi (duo, 1); Orietta Berti (2); Ricchi e Poveri (duo, 3); Clementino (solo, 1–5); Gigi D'Alessio (1–5); Loredana Bertè (1–6)	Antonella Clerici
Italy	The Voice Kids	Rai 1	Season 1, Spring 2023: Melissa Agliottone; Season 2, Fall 2023: Simone Grande; Season 3, 2024: Melissa Memeti; Season 4, 2026: Matteo Trullu; Season 5, 2027: Upcoming season	Current; Loredana Bertè; Arisa (2–); Clementino & Rocco Hunt (duo, 4–); Nek (4–); Former; Ricchi e Poveri (duo, 1); Gigi D'Alessio (1–3); Clementino (solo, 1–3)	Antonella Clerici
Italy	The Voice Generations	Rai 1	Season 1, 2024: Gino & Noemi; Season 2, 2026: Jessica & Gilda	Current; Loredana Bertè; Arisa; Clementino & Rocco Hunt (duo, 2–); Nek (2–); Former; Gigi D'Alessio (1); Clementino (solo, 1)	Antonella Clerici
Japan	The Voice Japan	TV Tokyo; Website	Season 1, 2023: Yurina Koyanagi	Yuuri; Maximum The Ryokun; Izumi Nakasone; Shikao Suga	Jay Kabira
Kazakhstan	Current; The Voicе Қазақстан (7–); Former; Қазақстан Дауысы (1–3); The Voice of Kazakhstan; Голос Казахстана (4); The Voice Kazakhstan; Qazaqstan дауысы (5–6); The Voice of Kazakhstan	Current; Khabar (7–); Former; Perviy Kanal Evraziya (4); Qazaqstan TV (1–3, 5–6)	Season 1, 2013–14: Shaharizat Seidakhmet; Season 2, 2014–15: Bauyrzhan Retbaev; Season 3, 2015: Murat Xayrolda; Season 4, 2016–17: Dinmuhammed Dauletov; Season 5, 2021: Quralay Meyrambek; Season 6, 2023: Musa Marat; Season 7, 2025: Nurai Mykty	Current; Meirambek Besbaev (7–); Bagym Mukhitdenova & Bayan Alaguzova (duo 7–); Baigali Serkebayev (7–); TURAR (7–); Former; Medeu Arynbaev (1–2); Nurlan Alban (1–3); Almas Kishkenbayev (1–3); Madina Saduakasova (1–3); Rustem Nurzhigit (3); Ali Okapov (4); Eva Becher (4); Nurlan Abdullin (4); Zhanna Orynbasarova (4); Saken Maigaziyev (5); Alem (5); Mayra Muhammad (5); Marzhan Arapbayeva (5–6); Zhanar Dugalova (6); Rakhym Kuandyk (6); Tolegen Mukhamejanov (6)	Current; Tursynbek Qabatov (7–); Maqsat Rahmet (finale, 7); Former; Azamat Satybaldy (1–3); Chingiz Kapin (4); Galym Kenshilik (5; finale, 6); Taukel Musilim (5); Jubanish Jeksen (6); Irina Ten (6)
Kazakhstan	Голос Дети Казахстана^{14} (1); The Voice Kids Kazakhstan; Qazaqstan дауысы. Балалар (2–3); The Voice of Kazakhstan. Kids	Perviy Kanal Evraziya (1); Qazaqstan TV (2–3)	Season 1, 2017: Daniil Yun; Season 2, 2022: Ersultan Omar; Season 3, 2023: Nurshat Kusanova	Ali Okapov (1); Eva Becher (1); Zhanna Orynbasarova (1); Marzhan Arapbayeva (2); Dastan Orazbekov (2); Zhanar Dugalova (2); Jubanish Jeksen (2–3); Alem (3); Tolkyn Zabirova (3); Marhaba Sabi (3)^{7}	Chingiz Kapin (1); Galym Kenshilik (2–3); Gulnur Orazymbetova (backstage, 2); Zhuldyz Omirgali (backstage, 3)
Lithuania	Lietuvos Balsas; The Voice of Lithuania	LNK	Season 1, 2012: Julija Jegorova; Season 2, 2013–14: Paulius Bagdanavičius; Season 3, 2014–15: Justina Budaitė; Season 4, 2015–16: Kotryna Juodzevičiūtė; Season 5, 2017–18: Monika Marija Paulauskaitė; Season 6, 2018: Gerda Šukytė; Season 7, 2020: Evita Cololo; Season 8, 2021: Meidė Šlamaitė; Season 9, 2023: Anyanya Udongwo; Season 10, 2024–25: Sidas Gvozdiovas; Season 11, 2026: Current season	Current; Mantas Jankavičius (9–); Monika Liu (7–9, 11–); Žemaitukai (duo, 11–); Aistè (11–); Former; Violeta Tarasovienė (1); Egidijus Sipavičius (1); Jurgis Didžiulis & Erica Jennings (duo, 1); Merūnas Vitulskis (1–3); Katažina Nemycko (2–3); Arūnas Valinskas & Inga Valinskienė (duo, 2–3); Rūta Ščiogolevaitė (4); Aleksandras Ivanauskas-Fara (4); Renata Norvilė & Deivis Norvilas (duo, 4); Džordana Butkutė (5); Leon Somov (5–6); Inga Jankauskaitė (5–6); Donatas Montvydas (2–8); Moniqué (7–8); Justinas Jarutis (6–9); Benas Aleksandravičius (9–10); Gabrielė Vilkickytė (10); Jessica Shy (10); Free Finga (comeback stage, 10)	Current; Rolandas Mackevičius (4–); Eglė Jurgaitytė (backstage, 10–); Former; Vytautas Rumšas Jr. (1); Inga Jankauskaitė (2–3); Rolandas Vilkončius (2–3); Jonas Nainys (4); Žygimantas Barysas (backstage, 1); Santa Audickaitė (backstage, 2–3); Šarūnas Kirdeikis (backstage, 2–3); Agnė Juškėnaitė (backstage, 4–5); Ignas Lelys (backstage, 6); Karolina Meschino (backstage, 7); KaYra (backstage, 8–9)
Lithuania	Lietuvos balsas. Vaikai; The Voice of Lithuania. Kids	LNK	Season 1, 2019: Milėja Stankevičiūtė; Season 2, 2020: Matas Saukantas; Season 3, 2021: Džiugas Joneikis	Monika Marija (1–2); Donatas Montvydas (1–3); Mantas Jankavičius (1–3); Moniqué (3)	Rolandas Mackevičius (1–3); Karolina Meschino (backstage, 2–3)
Lithuania	Lietuvos balsas. Senjorai; The Voice of Lithuania. Senior	LNK	Season 1, 2019: Gedeminas Jepšas	Monika Marija; Justinas Jarutis; Inga Jankauskaitė; Mantas Jankavičius	Rolandas Mackevičius; Karolina Meschino
Lithuania	Lietuvos Balsas. Kartos; The Voice of Lithuania. Generations	LNK	Season 1, 2022: Hey! Mix; Season 2, 2024: T3	Current; Vaidas Baumila; Benas Aleksandravičius; Nomeda Kazlaus (2–); Gabrielė Vilkickytė (2–); Former; Ieva Prudnikovaitė (1); 69 Danguje (trio, 1)^{17}	Current; Rolandas Mackevičius; Eglė Jurgaitytė (backstage, 2–); Former; Ieva Mackevičienė (backstage, 1)
Malaysia; Singapore	The Voice – 决战好声; The Voice – Battle for the Best Voice	StarHub TV E City; Astro AEC	Season 1, 2017: Lim Wen Suen	Sky Wu (1); Ding Dang (1); Gary Chaw (1); Hanjin Tan (1)	Siow Hui Mei (1); Wong Woon Hong (1)
Malta	The Voice Kids^{25}	TVM	Season 1, 2022–23: Dawn Desire; Season 2, 2025: Eliza Borg; Season 3, 2026: Beppe Caruana	Current; Destiny Chukunyere; Aleandro Spiteri Monsigneur (3–); Gaia Cauchi (3–); Former; Owen Leuellen (1); Gianluca Bezzina (1–2); Sarah Bonnici (2)	Current; Maxine Pace (2–); Former; Sarah Bajada (1)
Malta	The Voice Senior	TVM	Season 1, 2024: Cancelled	TBA	TBA
Mexico	La Voz... México (1–7); The Voice... Mexico; La Voz (8–11); The Voice	Las Estrellas (1–7); Website; Azteca Uno (8–11); Website	Season 1, 2011: Oscar Cruz; Season 2, 2012: Luz Maria; Season 3, 2013: Marcos Razo; Season 4, 2014: Guido Rochin; Season 5, 2016: Yuliana Martínez; Season 6, 2017: Luis Adrián Cruz; Season 7, 2018: Cristina Ramos; Season 8, 2019: Fatima Dominguez; Season 9, 2020: Fernando Sujo; Season 10, 2021: Sherlyn Sánchez; Season 11, 2022: Fátima Elizondo	Lucero (1); Aleks Syntek (1); Espinoza Paz (1); Beto Cuevas (2); Jenni Rivera^{†} (2); Paulina Rubio (2); Marco Antonio Solís (3); Wisin & Yandel (duo, 3); Alejandra Guzmán (3); Ricky Martin (4); Julión Álvarez (4); J Balvin (5); Gloria Trevi (5); Los Tigres del Norte (duo, 5); Alejandro Sanz (1, 5); Laura Pausini (4, 6); Yuri (4, 6); Carlos Vives (6); Maluma (6–7); Carlos Rivera (7); Anitta (7); Natalia Jiménez (7); Yahir (8); Lupillo Rivera (8); Ricardo Montaner (8–9); Belinda (8–9); Christian Nodal (9); María José (9–10); Edith Márquez (10); Jesús Navarro (10); Miguel Bosé (2, 10); David Bisbal (3, 11); Yuridia (11); Ha*Ash (duo, 11); Joss Favela (11)	Mark Tacher (1); Jacqueline Bracamontes (2–6); Lele Pons (7); Jimena Pérez (8); Eddy Vilard (9–11); Cynthia Urías (backstage, 1–2); Lidia Ávila (backstage, 3); Paty Cantú (backstage, 4); Natalia Téllez (backstage, 5); Odalys Ramírez (backstage, 6–7); Sofía Aragón (backstage, 9–11)
Mexico	La Voz Kids; The Voice Kids	Las Estrellas (1–2); Azteca Uno (3–4); Website	Season 1, 2017: Eduardo Barba; Season 2, 2019: Roberto Xavier; Season 3, 2021: Randy Ortiz; Season 4, 2022: Kevin Aguilar	Maluma (1); Emmanuel & Mijares (duo, 1); Rosario Flores (1); Carlos Rivera (2); Lucero (2); Melendi (2); Belinda (3); María José (3); Camilo (3); Mau y Ricky (duo, 3–4); Paty Cantú (4); Joss Favela (4); María León (4)^{7}	Yuri (1–2); Eddy Vilard (3–4); Olivia Peralta (backstage, 1–2)
Mexico	La Voz Senior; The Voice Senior	Azteca Uno; Website	Season 1, 2019: Salvador Rivera; Season 2, 2021: Omar Alexander	Lupillo Rivera (1); Ricardo Montaner (1–2); Belinda (1–2); Yahir (1–2); María José (2)	Jimena Pérez (1); Eddy Vilard (2)
Mongolia	The Voice of Mongolia	Mongol TV; Website	Season 1, 2018: Enguun Tseyendash; Season 2, 2020: Yadam Khurelmunkh; Season 3, 2022: Davaadalai Gerelt-Od; Season 4, 2025–26: E.Amin-Erdene	Current; Uka; Baachka (4–); Big Gee (4–); Naagii (4–); Former; Ononbat Sed (1–2); Bold Dorjsuren (1–3); Otgonbayar Damba (1–3); Naranzun Badruugan (3)	Ankhbayar Ganbold; Uuganbayar Enkhbat
Mongolia	The Voice Kids	Mongol TV; Website	Season 1, 2024: E.Chinguun; Season 2, 2026: Upcoming season	Uka; Naagii; ThunderZ	Uuganbayar Enkhbat; Sansarmaa Battur
Myanmar	The Voice Myanmar	MRTV-4	Season 1, 2018: Ngwe Soe; Season 2, 2019: Novem Htoo; Season 3, 2020: Nool	Lynn Lynn (1); Kyar Pauk (1–3); Yan Yan Chan (1–3); Ni Ni Khin Zaw (1–3); R Zarni (2–3)	Tayzar Kyaw
Nepal	The Voice of Nepal	Current; Himalaya Television (2–); Former; Kantipur (1); Kantipur HD (1); Website	Season 1, 2018: CD Vijaya Adhikari; Season 2, 2019: Ram Limbu; Season 3, 2021: Kiran Gajmer; Season 4, 2022: Karan Rai; Season 5, 2023–24: Binod Rai; Season 6, 2025: Proshesh Pandey; Season 7, 2025–26: Nita Kumari Thapa Sanjita; Season 8, 2026–27: Current season	Current; Pramod Kharel (1–5, 7–); Milan Newar (5, 8–); Naren Limbu (8–); Ekdev Limbu (8–); Former; Sanup Paudel (1); Abhaya Subba (1); Astha Raut (2); Deep Shrestha (1–3); Trishna Gurung (3); Prabisha Adhikari (4); Rajesh Payal Rai (4–5); Uday Sotang (5–6); Khem Century (6–7); Raju Lama (2–4, 6–7); Melina Rai (6–7)	Current; Sushil Nepal; Former; Oshin Sitaula (1)
Nepal	The Voice Kids	Himalaya Television	Season 1, 2021–22: Jenish Upreti; Season 2, 2023: Spandan Subba; Season 3, 2024: Anuhya Tamang; Season 4, 2025: Sonali Rajbhandari; Season 5, 2026: Subashna Khadka	Current; Milan Newar; Satya Raj Acharya (4–); Arjun Sapkota (5–); Wangden Sherpa (5–)^{7}; Former; Raju Lama (1); Prabisha Adhikari (1–2); Sushant KC (2); Pramod Kharel (1–3); Chhewang Lama (3); Melina Rai (3–4); Khem Century (4)	Sushil Nepal (1–2, 4–); Roneeshma Shrestha (3–)
Netherlands (Original)	The Voice of Holland; Original	RTL 4 Website	Season 1, 2010–11: Ben Saunders†; Season 2, 2011–12: Iris Kroes; Season 3, 2012: Leona Philippo; Season 4, 2013: Julia van der Toorn; Season 5, 2014: OG3NE; Season 6, 2015–16: Maan de Steenwinkel; Season 7, 2016–17: Pleun Bierbooms; Season 8, 2017–18: Jim van der Zee; Season 9, 2018–19: Dennis van Aarssen; Season 10, 2019–20: Sophia Kruithof; Season 11, 2020–21: Dani van Velthoven; Season 12, 2022: Cancelled; Season 13, 2026: Ruben Hillen; Season 14, 2027: Upcoming season	Current; Ilse DeLange (4–5, 13–); Willie Wartaal (13–); Suzan & Freek (duo, 13–); Dinand Woesthoff (13–); Snelle & Domien Verschuuren (duo, comeback stage, 14–)^{19}; Former; Jeroen van der Boom (1); Angela Groothuizen (1–2); Nick & Simon (duo, 1–3); Roel van Velzen (1–3); Trijntje Oosterhuis (3–5); Marco Borsato (2–6); Guus Meeuwis (7); Sanne Hans (6–8); Lil' Kleine (9–10); Jan Smit (11); Anouk (6, 8–12); Ali B (4–12); Waylon (7–12); Glennis Grace (12); Typhoon & Maan (duo, comeback stage, 12)^{19}	Current; Chantal Janzen (10–); Edson da Graça (13–); Martijn Krabbé (13–, voice-over only); Former; Martijn Krabbé (1–12); Wendy van Dijk (1–9); Winston Gerschtanowitz (backstage, 1–4); Geraldine Kemper (backstage, 10–12); Jamai Loman (backstage, 5–9, 12)
Netherlands (Original)	The Voice Kids^{7} Original	RTL 4 Website	Season 1, 2012: Fabiënne Bergmans; Season 2, 2012–13: Laura van Kaam; Season 3, 2013–14: Ayoub Maach; Season 4, 2015: Lucas van Roekel; Season 5, 2016: Ésmée Schreurs; Season 6, 2017: Iris Verhoek; Season 7, 2018: Yosina Roemajauw; Season 8, 2019: Silver Metz; Season 9, 2020: Dax Hovius; Season 10, 2021: Emma Kok; Season 11, 2026–27: Upcoming season; Season 12, 2027: Upcoming season	Current; Ilse DeLange (5–8, 10–); Flemming (11–); Emma Heesters (11–); Claude (11–); Former; Angela Groothuizen (1–4); Nick & Simon (duo, 1–4); Douwe Bob (7); Marco Borsato (1–9); Anouk (8–9); Ali B (5–10); Sanne Hans (9–10); Snelle (10)	Current; Jamai Loman (9–); Quinty Misiedjan (11–); Former; Wendy van Dijk (1–8); Martijn Krabbé (1–10)
Netherlands (Original)	The Voice Senior; Original	RTL 4 Website	Season 1, 2018: Jimi Bellmartin^{†}; Season 2, 2019: Ruud Hermans; Season 3, 2020: Henny Thijssen; Season 4, 2021: Phil Bee	Geer & Goor (duo, 1); Marco Borsato (1–2); Ilse DeLange (1–4); Angela Groothuizen (1–4); Frans Bauer (2–4); Gerard Joling (solo, 3–4)	Martijn Krabbé; Wendy van Dijk (1); Lieke van Lexmond (2–4)
Nigeria	The Voice Nigeria	Africa Magic	Season 1, 2016: A'rese; Season 2, 2017: Idyl; Season 3, 2021: Esther Benyeogo; Season 4, 2022–23: Pere Jason	Waje (1–4); 2Baba (1); Patoranking (1–2); Timi Dakolo (1–2); Yemi Alade (2–3); Falz (3); Darey (3); Praiz (4); Niyola (4); Naeto C (4)	IK Osakioduwa (1–2); Stephanie Coker (backstage, 1–2); Toke Makinwa (3); Nancy Isime (3); Kate Henshaw (4); Zainab Balogun (4)
North Macedonia	The Voice of Macedonia	MRT 1	Season 1, 2027: New series	TBA	TBA
North Macedonia	The Voice Kids	MRT 1	Season 1, 2027: New series	TBA	TBA
Norway	The Voice – Norges beste stemme The Voice – Norway's Best Voice	TV2; Website	Season 1, 2012: Martin Halla; Season 2, 2013: Knut Marius; Season 3, 2015: Yvonne Nordvik Sivertsen; Season 4, 2017: Thomas Løseth; Season 5, 2019: Maria Engås Halsne; Season 6, 2021: Erlend Gunstveit; Season 7, 2022: Jørgen Dahl Moe; Season 8, 2023: Kira Dalan-Eriksen; Season 9, 2024: Inger Lise Hope; Season 10, 2025: Andrea Holm; Season 11, 2026: Eskil Fossum Vik; Season 12, 2027: Upcoming season	Current; Espen Lind (2–3, 6–); Jarle Bernhoft (8–9, 11–); Ingebjørg Bratland (11–); Marion Raven (11–); Former; Magne Furuholmen (1); Tommy Tee (2); Lene Nystrøm (2); Sondre Lerche (1–3); Hanne Sørvaag (1, 3); Lene Marlin (4–5); Morten Harket (4–5); Martin Danielle (4–5); Matoma (6–7); Ina Wroldsen (6–9); Yosef Wolde-Mariam (1, 3–10); Gabrielle Leithaug (10); Eva Weel Skram (10)	Current; Siri Avlesen (7–); Maria Bodøgaard (backstage); Former; Øyvind Mund (1–6)
Pakistan	The Voice Pakistan	TBA	Season 1, 2027: New series	TBA	TBA
Peru	La Voz Peru; The Voice Peru	Latina Televisión	Season 1, 2013: Daniel Lazo; Season 2, 2014: Ruby Palomino; Season 3, 2015: Yamilet de la Jara; Season 4, 2021: Marcela Navarro; Season 5, 2022: Lita Pezo; Season 6, 2023: Luis Manuel	Jerry Rivera (1–2); El Puma (1–2); Kalimba (1–2); Gian Marco Zignago (3); Álex Lora (3); Luis Enrique (3); Guillermo Dávila (4); Mike Bahía (4); Daniela Darcourt (4–5); Noel Schajris (5); Christian Yaipén (5); Eva Ayllón (1–6); Mauricio Mesones (6); Maricarmen Marin (6); Raúl Romero (6)	Diego Ubierna (1–2); Cristian Rivero (1–5); Jesús Alzamora (3, 6); María Paz Gonzales-Vigil (6); Karen Schwarz (Live shows, 4–5)
Peru	La Voz Kids; The Voice Kids	Latina Televisión	Season 1, 2014: Amy Gutiérrez; Season 2, 2015: Sofía Hernández; Season 3, 2016: Nicolás Parra; Season 4, 2021: Gianfranco Bustios; Season 5, 2022: Gianmarco Morales	Kalimba (1–2); Anna Carina (1–3); Luis Enrique (3); Daniela Darcourt (4); Joey Montana (4); Christian Yaipén (4); Eva Ayllón (1–5); Victor Muñoz (5); Maricarmen Marin (5); Ezio Oliva (5)^{7}	Cristian Rivero (1–5); Almendra Gomelsky (1); Gigi Mitre (2); Katia Condos (3); Gianella Neyra (4); Karen Schwarz (5)
Peru	La Voz Senior; The Voice Senior	Latina Televisión	Season 1, 2021: Mito Plaza; Season 2, 2022: Javier Carranza	Pimpinela (duo, 1); Tony Succar (1); Eva Ayllón (1–2); Daniela Darcourt (1–2); René Farrait (2); Raúl Romero (2)	Cristian Rivero; Karen Schwarz (Live shows)
Peru	La Voz Generaciones; The Voice Generations	Latina Televisión	Season 1, 2022–23: Los Dávila	Eva Ayllón; Tony Succar & Mimy Succar (duo); Christian Yaipén	Cristian Rivero; Karen Schwarz
Philippines	The Voice of the Philippines	Current; GMA Network (3–); Former; ABS-CBN (1–2)	Season 1, 2013: Mitoy Yonting; Season 2, 2014–15: Jason Dy	apl.de.ap (1–2); Lea Salonga (1–2); Sarah Geronimo (1–2); Bamboo Mañalac (1–2)	Toni Gonzaga (1–2); Luis Manzano (2); Robi Domingo (backstage, 1–2); Alex Gonzaga (backstage, 1–2)
Philippines	The Voice Kids	Current; GMA Network (6–); Former; ABS-CBN (1–4); Kapamilya Channel (5); A2Z (5); TV5 (5)	Season 1, 2014: Lyca Gairanod; Season 2, 2015: Elha Nympha; Season 3, 2016: Joshua Oliveros; Season 4, 2019: Vanjoss Bayaban; Season 5, 2023: Shane Bernabe; Season 6, 2024: Nevin Garceniego; Season 7, 2025: Sofia Mallares; Season 8, 2026: Current season; Season 9, 2027: Upcoming season	Current; Julie Anne San Jose (6–); Yeng Constantino (8–); Gloc-9 (8–); Former; Sharon Cuneta (3); Lea Salonga (1–4); Sarah Geronimo (1–2, 4); Bamboo Mañalac (1–5); KZ Tandingan (5); Martin Nievera (5); Stell (6); Pablo (6); Billy Crawford (6–7); Zack Tabudlo (7); Paolo and Miguel Benjamin Guico (duo, 7)	Current; Dingdong Dantes (6–); Gabbi Garcia (backstage, 8–); Former; Luis Manzano (1–3); Toni Gonzaga (4); Alex Gonzaga (backstage, 1); Yeng Constantino (backstage, 2); Kim Chiu (backstage, 3); KaladKaren (online, 4); Robi Domingo (backstage, 2–4; main, 5); Bianca Gonzalez (until semi-finals, backstage, 5); Jolina Magdangal (finals, backstage, 5); Jeremy Glinoga (online, 4–5); Elha Nympha (online, 5); Josh Ford (finals, online, 7); Cheska Fausto (finals, online, 7)
Philippines	The Voice Teens	ABS-CBN (1–2); Kapamilya Channel (2–3)	Season 1, 2017: Jona Marie Soquite; Season 2, 2020: Team Winners per Coach^{28}; Season 3, 2024: Jillian Pamat	Sharon Cuneta (1); Lea Salonga (1–2); Sarah Geronimo (1–2); apl.de.ap (2); Bamboo Mañalac (1–3); KZ Tandingan (3); Martin Nievera (3)	Toni Gonzaga (1); Luis Manzano (1–2); Alex Gonzaga (2); Robi Domingo (online, 1; main, 3); Bianca Gonzalez (3); KaladKaren (online, 2); Jeremy Glinoga (online, 2–3); Lorraine Galvez (online, 3); Kendra Aguirre (online, 3); Isang Manlapaz (online, 3)
Philippines	The Voice Generations	GMA Network	Season 1, 2023: VOCALMYX	Chito Miranda; Billy Crawford; Julie Anne San Jose; Stell	Dingdong Dantes; Betong Sumaya (online); Jennie Gabriel (online); Crystal Paras (online); Timmy Albert (online); Matt Lozano (online); Shuvee Etrata (online)
Poland	The Voice of Poland	TVP2; Website	Season 1, 2011: Damian Ukeje; Season 2, Spring 2013: Natalia Sikora; Season 3, Fall 2013: Mateusz Ziółko; Season 4, Spring 2014: Juan Carlos Cano; Season 5, Fall 2014: Aleksandra Nizio; Season 6, 2015: Krzysztof Iwaneczko; Season 7, 2016: Mateusz Grędziński; Season 8, 2017: Marta Gałuszewska; Season 9, 2018: Marcin Sójka; Season 10, 2019: Alicja Szemplińska; Season 11, 2020: Krystian Ochman; Season 12, 2021: Marta Burdynowicz; Season 13, 2022: Dominik Dudek; Season 14, 2023: Jan Górka; Season 15, 2024: Anna Iwanek; Season 16, 2025: Jan Piwowarczyk; Season 17, 2026: Current season	Current; Tomson & Baron (duo, 2–8, 10–); Michał Szpak (8–11, 15–); Kuba Badach (15–); Edyta Bartosiewicz (17–); Ania Karwan (comeback stage, 16–)^{19}; Former; Anna Dąbrowska (1); Kayah (1); Nergal (1); Natalia Kukulska (7); Andrzej Piaseczny (1, 6–8); Maria Sadowska (3–4, 6–8); Piotr Cugowski (9); Grzegorz Hyży (9); Patrycja Markowska (2, 9); Kamil Bednarek (10); Edyta Górniak (3, 5–6, 11); Urszula Dudziak (11); Sylwia Grzeszczak (12); Justyna Steczkowska (2, 4–5, 12–14); Marek Piekarczyk (2–5, 12–14); Lanberry (13–15); Margaret (10, 16)	Current; Paulina Chylewska (15–); Maciej Musiał (backstage, 2–9; main, 10–11, 15–); Jan Dąbrowski (backstage, 15, 17–); Sylwia Dąbrowska (backstage, 17–); Former; Hubert Urbański (1); Marika (2–4); Magdalena Mielcarz (1, 5); Halina Mlynkova (6); Barbara Kurdej-Szatan (7–9); Mateusz Szymkowiak (backstage, 1); Iga Krefft (backstage, 2); Marta Siurnik (backstage, 3–5); ReZigiusz (backstage, 6); Łukasz Jakubiak (backstage, 7); Krzysztof Jankowski (backstage, 9); Marcelina Zawadzka (backstage, 8, 10); Adam Zdrójkowski (backstage, 10–11); Małgorzata Tomaszewska–Słomina (backstage, 11; main, 12–13); Michał Szczygieł (backstage, 12); Tomasz Kammel (2–14); Aleksander Sikora (backstage, 12–14); Hi Hania (backstage, 16)
Poland	The Voice Kids	TVP2; Website	Season 1, 2018: Roksana Węgiel; Season 2, 2019: Anna Dąbrowska; Season 3, 2020: Marcin Maciejczak; Season 4, 2021: Sara James; Season 5, 2022: Mateusz Krzykała; Season 6, 2023: Martyna Gąsak; Season 7, 2024: Michell Siwak; Season 8, 2025: Zosia Wójcik; Season 9, 2026: Wiktor Sas; Season 10, 2027: Upcoming season	Current; Cleo (2–); Tribbs (9–); Tomson & Baron (duo, 1–8, 10–); Sara James (10–)^{7}; Former; Edyta Górniak (1); Dawid Kwiatkowski (1–6); Natasza Urbańska (7–8); Blanka (9)	Current; Paulina Chylewska (8–); Michalina Sosna (8–); Jan Dąbrowski (backstage, 2–3, 8–); Antoni Scardina (backstage, 2–); Former; Barbara Kurdej-Szatan (1–2); Adam Zdrójkowski (backstage, 1); Leon Paszek (backstage, 1); Witold Sosulski (backstage, 1); Tomasz Kammel (1–7); Ida Nowakowska (3–7); Oliwier Szot (backstage, 4–7)
Poland	The Voice Senior	TVP2; Website	Season 1, 2019: Jola, Krystyna, & Ela Szydłowskie; Season 2, 2021: Barbara Parzeczewska; Season 3, 2022: Krzysztof Prusik; Season 4, 2023: Zbigniew Zaranek; Season 5, 2024: Regina Bavcevic; Season 6, 2025: Wojciech Bardowski; Season 7, 2026: Violetta Kapcewicz; Season 8, 2027: Upcoming season	Current; Andrzej Piaseczny (1–2, 6–); Robert Janowski (6–); Alicja Majewska (1–3, 7–); Majka Jeżowska (7–); Former; Marek Piekarczyk (1); Urszula Dudziak (1); Izabela Trojanowska (2); Witold Paszt^{†} (2–3); Piotr Cugowski (3–4); Maryla Rodowicz (3–5); Alicja Węgorzewska (4–5); Tomasz Szczepanik (4–5); Halina Frąckowiak (5); Małgorzata Ostrowska (6); Tatiana Okupnik (6)	Current; Marta Manowska (1–3, 5–); Łukasz Nowicki (7–); Former; Marek Grąbczewski (backstage); Tomasz Kammel (1); Małgorzata Tomaszewska–Słomina (4); Nina Busk^{†} (backstage, 1); Rafał Brzozowski (2–5); Robert Stockinger (6–)
Portugal	Current; The Voice Portugal (2–); Former; A Voz de Portugal (1); The Voice of Portugal	RTP1	Season 1, 2011–12: Denis Filipe; Season 2, 2014: Rui Drumond; Season 3, 2015–16: Deolinda Kinzimba; Season 4, 2016: Fernando Daniel; Season 5, 2017: Tomás Adrião; Season 6, 2018: Marvi; Season 7, 2019–20: Rita Sanches; Season 8, 2020–21: Luís Trigacheiro; Season 9, 2021–22: Rodrigo Lourenço; Season 10, 2022–23: Gustavo Reinas; Season 11, 2023–24: José Bacelar; Season 12, 2024–25: Rafael Ribeiro; Season 13, 2025–26: Rafael Alves; Season 14, 2026–27: Current season; Season 15, 2027–28: Upcoming season	Current; Fernando Daniel (11–14); Sónia Tavares (11–); David Carreira & Mickael Carreira (duo, 14–); Cláudia Pascoal (14–); Luís Trigacheiro (second chance, 14–); Former; Anjos (duo, 1); Mia Rose (1); Paulo Gonzo (1); Rui Reininho (1–2); Anselmo Ralph (2–6); Mickael Carreira (solo, 2–6); Aurea (3–9); Marisa Liz (2–10); Diogo Piçarra (7–10); Carolina Deslandes (10); Dino d'Santiago (10); António Zambujo (7–9, 11); Nininho Vaz Maia (12); Calema (13); Sara Correia (11–13)	Current; Catarina Furtado; Maria Petronilho (backstage, 12–); Former; Vasco Palmeirim (2–10); Diogo Beja (backstage, 1); Laura Figueiredo (backstage, 2); Mariana Monteiro (backstage, 2); Pedro Fernandes (backstage, 2); Jani Gabriel (backstage, 3–5); Mafalda de Castro (backstage, 6–7); Fábio Lopes (backstage, 8–9); Catarina Maia (backstage, 10–11)
Portugal	The Voice Kids	RTP1	Season 1, 2014: Diogo Garcia; Season 2, 2021: Simão Oliveira; Season 3, 2022: Maria Gil; Season 4, 2023: Júlia Machado; Season 5, 2024: Victoria Nicole; Season 6, 2025: Inês Gonçalves; Season 7, 2026: Salvador Rio	Current; Cuca Roseta (5–); Diogo Piçarra (6–); Miguel Cristovinho (6–); Nena (6–)^{7}; Former; Raquel Tavares (1); Daniela Mercury (1); Anselmo Ralph (1); Marisa Liz (2); Carolina Deslandes (2–3); Fernando Daniel (2–4); Aurea (4); Carlão (2–5); Bárbara Tinoco (3–5); Nininho Vaz Maia (5)	Current; Catarina Furtado (2–); Maria Petronilho (backstage, 6–); Former; Vasco Palmeirim (1); Mariana Monteiro (1); Rui Maria Pêgo (backstage, 1); Bárbara Lourenço (backstage: Blind auditions and Battles, 2); Fábio Lopes (backstage: Live shows, 2; full season, 3); Catarina Maia (backstage, 4–5)
Portugal	The Voice Gerações; The Voice Generations	RTP1	Season 1, 2022: Rodrigo d'Orey & Teresa de Castro; Season 2, 2023: Todagente; Season 3, 2025: D'Anto; Season 4, 2026: Os En'Canta Modas	Current; Mickael Carreira; Anselmo Ralph; Marisa Liz (3–); Gisela João (3–); Former; Bárbara Bandeira (1); Simone de Oliveira (1–2); Sara Correia (2)	Current; Catarina Furtado; Maria Petronilho (backstage, 3–); Former; Vasco Palmeirim (1–2); Catarina Maia (backstage, 2)
Romania; Moldova^{10}	Vocea României; The Voice of Romania	Pro TV; Pro TV Chișinău; Website	Season 1, 2011: Ștefan Stan; Season 2, 2012: Julie Mayaya; Season 3, 2013: Mihai Chițu; Season 4, 2014: Tiberiu Albu; Season 5, 2015: Cristina Bălan; Season 6, 2016: Teodora Buciu; Season 7, 2017: Ana Munteanu; Season 8, 2018: Bogdan Ioan; Season 9, 2019: Dragoș Moldovan; Season 10, 2022: Iulian Nunucă; Season 11, 2023: Alexandra Căpitănescu; Season 12, 2024: Aura Șova; Season 13, 2025: Alessia Pop; Season 14, 2026: Current season	Current; Tudor Chirilă (4–); Smiley (solo, 1–9, 11–); Irina Rimes (8–14); Theo Rose & Horia Brenciu (duo, 11–); Former; Marius Moga (1–6); Loredana Groza (1–7); Adrian Despot (7); Andra (8); Horia Brenciu (solo, 1–3, 9); Denis Roabeș (10); Smiley & Theo Rose (duo, 10)	Current; Pavel Bartoș; Adela Popescu (backstage, 12, semifinale, 13–); Former; Roxana Ionescu (1); Nicoleta Luciu (2–3); Vlad Roșca (backstage, 1–3); Oana Tache (backstage, 4–5); Lili Sandu (backstage, 6–7); Laura Giurcanu (backstage, 8); Irina Fodor (backstage, 8–9); Iulia Pârlea (backstage, 10); Alina Ceușan (backstage, 11); Gina Pistol (backstage, 12, 1st live); Mihai Rait Dragomir (backstage, 12, finale)
Romania; Moldova^{10}	Vocea României Junior; The Voice of Romania Junior	Pro TV; Pro TV Chișinău; Website	Season 1, 2017: Maia Mălăncuș; Season 2, 2018: Maya Ciosa	Andra; Marius Moga; Inna	Mihai Bobonete; Robert Tudor
Russia	Голос^{14} The Voice	Channel One; Website	Season 1, 2012: Dina Garipova; Season 2, 2013: Sergey Volchkov; Season 3, 2014: Alexandra Vorobyeva; Season 4, 2015: Hieromonk Fotiy; Season 5, 2016: Daria Antonyuk; Season 6, 2017: Selim Alakhyarov; Season 7, 2018–19: Petr Zakharov; Season 8, 2019–20: Asker Berbekov; Season 9, 2020: Yana Gabbasova; Season 10, 2021: Alexander Volkodav; Season 11, 2023: Victoria Solomakhina; Season 12, 2024: Bogdan Shuvalov; Season 13, 2025: David Sanikidze; Season 14, 2026: Elmira Karakhanova	Grigory Leps (4–5); Ani Lorak (7); Konstantin Meladze (7–8); Sergey Shnurov (7–9); Valeriy Syutkin (8–9); Dima Bilan (1–3, 5–6, 10); Leonid Agutin (1–3, 5–6, 10); Alexander Gradsky^{†} (1–4, 6, 10); Zivert (12); Polina Gagarina (4–5, 8–9, 11–13); Anton Belyaev (11–13); Basta (4, 7, 9, 11, 13); Hibla Gerzmava (13); Vladimir Presnyakov (11–12, 14); Pelageya (1–3, 6, 10, 14); Ildar Abdrazakov (14); Anna Asti (14)	Dmitry Nagiev (1–10); Yana Churikova (11–14)
Russia	Голос. Дети^{14} The Voice Kids	Channel One; Website	Season 1, 2014: Alisa Kozhikina; Season 2, 2015: Sabina Mustaeva; Season 3, 2016: Danil Pluzhnikov; Season 4, 2017: Elizaveta Kachurak; Season 5, 2018: Rutger Garekht; Season 6, 2019: No winner^{22}; Season 7, 2020: Olesya Kazachenko; Season 8, 2021: Vladislav Tyukin; Season 9, 2022: Adelia Zagrebina; Season 10, 2022–23: Anna Dorovskaya; Season 11, 2024: Vasily Igolkin; Season 12, 2025: Maria Nikulina; Season 13, 2026: Current season	Current; Polina Gagarina (7, 9, 13–); Aida Garifullina & Alexey Vorobyov (duo, 13–); Vanya Dmitrienko (13–); Former; Maxim Fadeev (1–2); Leonid Agutin (3); Nyusha (4); Pelageya (1–3, 5–6); Valery Meladze (4–7); LOBODA (6, 8); Basta (5, 7–10); Egor Kreed (8–10); MakSim (10); Yulianna Karaulova (11); JONY (11); Dima Bilan (1–4, 11–12); Vladimir Presnyakov & Natalia Podolskaya (duo, 12); Aida Garifullina (solo, 12)	Current; Yana Churikova (10–); Valya Karnaval (11–); Former; Dmitry Nagiev (1–9); Natalia Vodianova (1); Anastasia Chevazhevskaya (2); Valeria Lanskaya (3); Svetlana Zeinalova (4); Aglaya Shilovskaya (6); Agata Muceniece (5, 7–10)
Russia	Голос. 60+ The Voice 60+	Channel One; Website	Season 1, 2018: Lidia Muzaleva; Season 2, 2019: Leonid Sergienko; Season 3, 2020: Dina Yudina; Season 4, 2021: Mikhail Serebryakov^{†}; Season 5, 2022: Raisa Dmitrenko	Leonid Agutin (1); Valery Meladze (1); Pelageya (1–2); Valeriya (2); Mikhail Boyarsky (2); Lev Leshchenko (1–3); Tamara Gverdtsiteli (3); Garik Sukachov (3); Stas Namin (4); Laima Vaikule (4); Valery Leontiev (4); Oleg Gazmanov (4); Elena Vaenga (3, 5); Valeriy Syutkin (5); Alexander Malinin (5); Igor Kornelyuk (5)	Dmitry Nagiev (1–4); Larisa Guzeeva (5)
Russia	Голос. Уже не дети The Voice No longer kids Original	Channel One; Website	Season 1, 2023: Veronika Syromlya	Dima Bilan; Pelageya; Polina Gagarina; Egor Kreed	Yana Churikova
Serbia	The Voice – Najlepši glas The Voice – The Most Beautiful Voice	Prva TV	Season 1, 2027: New series	TBA	TBA
South Africa	The Voice South Africa	M-Net^{9} Website	Season 1, 2016: Richard Stirton; Season 2, 2017: Craig Lucas; Season 3, 2019: Tasché Burger	Karen Zoid (1–2); Kahn Morbee (1–2); Bobby van Jaarsveld (1–2); Lira (1–3); Riana Nel (3); Francois Van Coke (3); Riky Rick^{†} (3)	Lungile Radu (1–2); Anele Mdoda (3); Stacey Norman (backstage, 1–2)
South Korea	The Voice of Korea	Mnet^{9} Website	Season 1, 2012: Son Seung-yeon; Season 2, 2013: Lee Ye-jun; Season 3, 2020: Kim Ji-hyun	Gil (1–2); Kangta (1–2); Baek Ji-young (1–2); Shin Seung-hun (1–2); Kim Jong-kook (3); BoA (3); Sung Si-kyung (3); Dynamic Duo (duo, 3)	Kim Jin-pyo (1–2); Jang Sung-kyu (3); Park Ji-yoon (backstage, 1–2)
South Korea	The Voice Kids	Mnet^{9} Website	Season 1, 2013: Kim Myung-ju	Yoon Sang (1); Seo In-young (1); Yang Yo-seob (1)	Jun Hyun-moo (1)
Spain; Andorra	La Voz^{13} The Voice	Current; Antena 3 (6–); Former; Telecinco (1–5); Website	Season 1, 2012: Rafa Blas; Season 2, 2013: David Barrull; Season 3, 2015: Antonio José; Season 4, 2016: Irene Caruncho; Season 5, 2017: Alba Gil; Season 6, 2019: Andrés Martín; Season 7, 2020: Kelly; Season 8, 2021: Inés Manzano; Season 9, 2022: Javier Crespo; Season 10, 2023: Elsa Tortonda; Season 11, 2024: Manuel Ayra; Season 12, 2025: Antía Pinal; Season 13, 2026: Current season	Current; Pablo López (5–7, 9–); Mika (12–); Melendi (1, 4, 13–); Lola Índigo (13–); Vanesa Martín (13–; battles); Former; David Bisbal (1–2); Rosario Flores (1–2); Manuel Carrasco (4–5); Juanes (5); Paulina Rubio (6); Alejandro Sanz (3–4, 7–8); Pablo Alborán (8); Laura Pausini (3, 7, 9); Miriam Rodríguez (comeback stage, 7–8, 10)^{19}; Luis Fonsi (6, 8–11); Antonio Orozco (2–3, 6–7, 9–11); Malú (1–5, 8, 10–12); Sebastián Yatra (12)	Current; Eva González (6–); Former; Jesús Vázquez (1–5); Tania Llasera (backstage, 1–5); Juanra Bonet (backstage, 6)
Spain; Andorra	La Voz Kids; The Voice Kids	Current; Antena 3 (5–); Former; Telecinco (1–4); Website	Season 1, 2014: María Parrado; Season 2, 2015: José María Ruiz; Season 3, 2017: Rocío Aguilar; Season 4, 2018: Melani García Gaspar; Season 5, 2019: Irene Gil; Season 6, 2021: Levi Díaz; Season 7, 2022: Pol Calvo; Season 8, 2023: Rubén Franco; Season 9, 2024: Alira Moya; Season 10, 2025: Lucas Paulano; Season 11, 2026: Eduardo Sánchez; Season 12, 2027: Upcoming season	Current; Edurne (10–); Ana Mena (11–); Antonio Orozco (3–4, 11–); Manuel Turizo (10, 12–)^{7}; Former; Malú (1); Manuel Carrasco (2); Vanesa Martín (5–6); Pablo López (7); Aitana (7–8); Sebastián Yatra (7–8); Rosario Flores (1–6, 8–9); Melendi (4–6, 9); David Bisbal^{15} (1–3, 5–10); Lola Indigo (9–10); Luis Fonsi (11)	Current; Eva González (5–); Juanra Bonet (backstage, 5–); Former; Jesús Vázquez (1–4); Tania Llasera (backstage, 1–4)
Spain; Andorra	La Voz Senior; The Voice Senior	Antena 3	Season 1, 2019: Helena Bianco; Season 2, 2020: Naida Abanovich; Season 3, 2022: Gwen Perry	Antonio Orozco (1–3); David Bisbal (1); Paulina Rubio (1); Pablo López (1); Rosana (2); Pastora Soler (2); David Bustamante (2–3); Niña Pastori (3); José Mercé (3)	Eva González
Spain; Andorra	La Voz All Stars; The Voice All Stars	Antena 3	Season 1, 2023: Toyemi	Luis Fonsi; Pablo López; Antonio Orozco; Malú	Eva González
Sri Lanka	The Voice Teens^{25}	Sirasa TV	Season 1, 2020: Hashen Dulanjana; Season 2, 2022: Pranirsha Thiyagaraja; Season 3, 2026: Janiru Kavinda	Current; Sanka Dineth (2–); Yohani (3–); Yasas Medagedara (3–); Raini Charuka Goonatillake (1–2) (battles onwards, 3–); Former; Ashanthi De Alwis (1); Dumal Warnakulasuriya (1); Sanuka Wickramasinghe (1); Lahiru Perera (2); Abhisheka Wimalaweera (2) (Blind auditions, 3)	Current; Julia Sonali; Former; Stephanie Siriwardhana (1-2)
Sri Lanka	The Voice Sri Lanka^{31}	Sirasa TV	Season 1, 2020–21: Harith Wijeratne; Season 2, 2022–23: Rameesh Sashinka; Season 3, 2024–25: Imesh Sandeepa; Season 4, 2026–27: Upcoming season	Current; Supun Perera (comeback stage, 2,) (3–)^{19}; Raini Charuka Goonatillake (3–); Hirushi (3–); Mihindu Ariyaratne (3–); Former; Kasun Kalhara (1–2); Sashika Nisansala (1–2); Umaria Sinhawansa (1–2); Bathiya and Santhush (duo, 1–2)	Current; Sumiran Dhananjaya Gunasekara; Former; Dinithi Walgamage (Blind auditions, 1); Kingsley Rathnayake (Battles, 1)
Sri Lanka	The Voice Kids	Sirasa TV	Season 1, 2023–24: Aslam Roshan	Pradeep Rangana; Uresha Ravihari; Harshana Dissanayake; Nadini Premadasa	Nathasha Perera
Sweden	The Voice Sverige; The Voice Sweden	TV4	Season 1, 2012: Ulf Nilsson	Petter (1); Ola Salo (1); Magnus Uggla (1); Carola Häggkvist (1)	Carina Berg (1); Simona Abraham (backstage, 1)
Switzerland; Liechtenstein	The Voice of Switzerland	SRF 1 (1–2); 3+ (3); Website	Season 1, 2013: Nicole Bernegger; Season 2, 2014: Tiziana Gulino; Season 3, 2020: Remo Forrer	Stress (1–2); Marc Sway (1–2); Stefanie Heinzmann (1–2); Philipp Fankhauser (1–2); DJ Antoine (3); Anna Rossinelli (3); Noah Veraguth (3); Büetzer Buebe (duo, 3)	Sven Epiney (1–2); Christa Rigozzi (3); Max Loong (3); Viola Tami (backstage, 1; main, 2); Tanya König (backstage, 2)
Thailand	The Voice Thailand	Current; True4U (10–); Former; Channel 3 (1–6); PPTV36 (7–8)One31 (9); Website	Season 1, 2012: Thanon Chamroen; Season 2, 2013: Rangsan Panyaruen; Season 3, 2014: Somsak Rinnairak; Season 4, 2015: Thittinan Aonpan; Season 5, 2016–17: Siphum Bencharat; Season 6, 2017–18: Wachirawit Chinkoet; Season 7, 2018–19: Pongsatorn Kambang; Season 8, 2019: Eakkamon Bunphothong; Season 9, 2024: Theeraphong Deaw; Season 10, 2026: Current season	Current; Kong Saharat; Jennifer Kim (1–4, 7–); Oat Pramote (9–); Jaii Taitosmith (9–); Former; Stamp Apiwat (1–3); Singto Numchok (4–6); Da Endorphine (5–6); Joey Boy (1–8); Pop Pongkul (7–8); Bowkylion (comeback stage 9)	Current; Songsit Roongnophakunsri; Former; Rinlanee Sripen (backstage, 2–6)
Thailand	The Voice Kids	Channel 3 (1–5); 3 HD (2–5); PPTV36 (6–7); Website	Season 1, 2013: Kuljira Tongkham; Season 2, 2014: Pornsawun Yanvaro; Season 3, 2015: Natharika Phetfu; Season 4, 2016: Jedsada Sukharom; Season 5, 2017: Siripong Srisukha; Season 6, 2019: Mac-Sirichai Chaiyakul; Season 7, 2020: Gracy Phattanan	Two Popetorn (1); Zani Nipaporn (1–3); Parn Thanaporn (1–3); Sumet & The Punk (duo, 2–3); Tongneng Rudklao (4–5); Lula (4–6); Tik Shiro (4–7); Joke So Cool (6–7); Mam Patcharida (6–7); Wan Thanakrit (7)^{7}	Songsit Roongnophakunsri; Rinlanee Sripen (1–5); Sawitree Sutthichanon (6–7)
Thailand	The Voice Senior	PPTV36; Website	Season 1, 2019: Sanae Damkham; Season 2, 2020: Ah Fort	Parn Thanaporn (1); Stamp Apiwat; Tam Charas; Kong Saharat; Took Viyada (2)	Songsit Roongnophakunsri
Thailand	The Voice All Stars	One31 (1)	Season 1, 2022: Pure Ekkaphan Wannasut	Joey Boy; Kong Saharat; Jennifer Kim; Pop Pongkul	Songsit Roongnophakunsri
Thailand	The Voice Pride	Channel 7 HD	Season 1, 2025: Nerd Natnicha	Timethai; Saowalak Leelabut; Chalatit Tantiwut	Songsit Roongnophakunsri
Thailand	The Voice Teens	True4U	Season 1, 2027: New series	Jeff Satur; Bowkylion; The Toys; Ink	Paris Intarakomalyasut
Thailand	The Voice Celebrity	True4U	Season 1, 2026: New series	Kong Saharat; Jennifer Kim; Oat Pramote; Jaii Taitosmith	Songsit Roongnophakunsri
Turkey	O Ses Türkiye; The Voice Turkey	Show TV (1); Star TV (2–3); TV8 (4–); Website	Season 1, 2011–12: Oğuz Berkay Fidan; Season 2, 2012–13: Mustafa Bozkurt; Season 3, 2013–14^{27}: Hasan Doğru; Season 4, 2014–15: Elnur Hüseynov; Season 5, 2015–16: Emre Sertkaya; Season 6, 2016–17: Dodan Özer; Season 7, 2017–18: Lütfiye Özipek; Season 8, 2018–19: Ferat Üngür; Season 9, 2019–20: Alkan Dalgakıran; Season 10, 2021–22: Hasan Koçak; Season 11, 2025: Mert Özer	Current; Beyazıt Öztürk (8–); Hadise (1–9, 11–); Gökhan Özoğuz (solo^{6}, 3–4, 7, 11–); Melike Şahin (11–); Former; Mustafa Sandal (1–2); Hülya Avşar (1–2); Mazhar Alanson & Özkan Uğur ^{†} (duo, 4); Gökhan & Hakan Özoğuz (duo^{6}, 5–6); Sibel Can (6); Yıldız Tilbe (7); Seda Sayan (8–9); Oğuzhan Koç (10); Murat Boz (1–3, 5–10); Ebru Gündeş (3–5, 10)	Current; Saadet Özsırkıntı (11–); Former; Acun Ilıcalı (1–10); Alp Kırşan (1–3); Zeynep Dörtkardeşler (4–9)
Turkey	O Ses Çocuklar^{7} The Voice Kids	Star TV (1); TV8 (2–3)	Season 1, 2014: Şahin Kendirci; Season 2, 2015: Bade Karakoç; Season 3, 2016: Derin Yeğin	Hadise (1–3); Murat Boz (1–2); Mustafa Ceceli (1–2); Oğuzhan Koç (2–3); Burak Kut (3)	Jess Molho (1–3); Sinem Yalçinkaya (backstage, 1); Zeynep Dörtkardeşler (backstage, 2–3)
Turkey	O Ses Türkiye Rap; The Voice Turkey Rap; Original	Exxen	Season 1, 2021: Ekin Koşar; Season 2, 2023: Eray Ünal	Mero (solo, 1); Murda (solo, 1); Eypio; Hadise; Mero & Murda (duo, 2); Sefo (2)	Heja (1); Saadet Özsırkıntı (2)
Ukraine	Голос країни^{14} The Voice of Ukraine	1+1 (1 – 12е5); TET (12е6 – 12e12); 1+1 Ukraine (13–); Belsat (13); Website	Season 1, 2011: Ivan Hanzera; Season 2, 2012: Pavlo Tabakov; Season 3, 2013: Anna Khodorovsʹka; Season 4, 2014: Ihor Hrokhotsʹkyy; Season 5, 2015: Anton Kopityn; Season 6, 2016: Vitalina Musyenko; Season 7, 2017: Oleksandr Klymenko; Season 8, 2018: Olena Lutsenko; Season 9, 2019: Oksana Mukha; Season 10, 2020: Roman Sasanchyn^{26}; Season 11, 2021: Serhiy Lazanovskyy; Season 12, 2022: Mariya Kvitka; Season 13, 2023: Mykhailo Panchyshyn (PTASHKIN); Season 14, 2026–27: Current season	Current; Artem Pyvovarov (13–); Tina Karol (3, 5–11, 14–); Monatik (9–11, 14–); Natalia Mohylevska (14–); Former; Ruslana (1); Stas Piekha (1); Diana Arbenina (1–2); Valeriya (2); Oleh Skrypka (2–3); Ani Lorak (4); Sergey Lazarev (4); Tamara Gverdtsiteli (4); Oleksandr Ponomariov (1–3, 5); Ivan Dorn (6); Jamala (7–8); Sergiy Babkin (7–8); Potap & NK (duo, 10); Dan Balan (9–10); Olegg Vynnyk (11); Potap (solo, 5–9, 12); Svyatoslav Vakarchuk (3–6, 12); Olya Polyakova (12); Nadya Dorofeeva (11–13); Julia Sanina (13); Ivan Klymenko (13); Comeback Stage; Oleksandra Zaritska & Andriy Matsola (comeback stage, 12)^{19}	Current; Yuriy Horbunov (5–); Kateryna Osadcha (1–3, 6–); Natalie Solonik (backstage 14–); Former; Andriy Domansʹkyy (1–3); Olʹha Freymut (4–5); Mykyta Dobrynin (backstage, 1); Anatoliy Anatolich (backstage, 1–5); Artem Gagarin (backstage, 8); Roma Geniy (backstage, 10); Slava Demin (backstage, 11); Serhiy Lazanovskyy (backstage, 12)
Ukraine	Голос. Діти^{14} The Voice Kids	1+1	Season 1, 2012–13: Anna Tkach; Season 2, 2015: Roman Sasanchyn^{26}; Season 3, 2016: Elina Ivaschenko; Season 4, 2017: Daneliya Tuleshova; Season 5, 2019: Oleksandr Zazarashvyli	Oleh Skrypka (1); LOBODA (1); Tina Karol (1–3); Potap (2–3); Monatik (3–4); Natalia Mohylevska (2, 4); Vremya i Steklo (duo, 4–5); Jamala (5); Dzidzio (5)	Andriy Domansʹkyy (1); Kateryna Osadcha (1–5); Yuriy Horbunov (2–5)
United Kingdom	The Voice UK	Current; ITV (6–)^{24} Website; Former; BBC One (1–5); Website	Season 1, 2012: Leanne Mitchell; Season 2, 2013: Andrea Begley; Season 3, 2014: Jermain Jackman; Season 4, 2015: Stevie McCrorie; Season 5, 2016: Kevin Simm; Season 6, 2017: Mo Adeniran; Season 7, 2018: Ruti Olajugbagbe; Season 8, 2019: Molly Hocking; Season 9, 2020: Blessing Chitapa; Season 10, 2021: Craig Eddie; Season 11, 2022: Anthonia Edwards; Season 12, 2023: Jen & Liv; Season 13, 2024: AVA; Season 14, 2026: Cate McHugh; Season 15, 2027: Upcoming season	Current; will.i.am; Kelly Rowland (14–); Cheryl (15–); Aitch (15–); Former; Danny O'Donoghue (1–2); Jessie J (1–2); Kylie Minogue (3); Ricky Wilson (3–5); Rita Ora (4); Boy George (5); Paloma Faith (5); Gavin Rossdale (6); Jennifer Hudson (6–8); Meghan Trainor (9); Olly Murs (7–12); Anne-Marie (10–12); LeAnn Rimes (13); Sir Tom Jones (1–4, 6–14); Tom Fletcher & Danny Jones (duo, 13–14)	Current; Alesha Dixon (15–); Stacey Solomon (backstage, 15–); Former; Holly Willoughby (1–2); Emma Willis (3–14); Reggie Yates (backstage, 1–2); Marvin Humes (backstage, 3–5); Cel Spellman (backstage, 6); Jamie Miller (backstage, 7); Vick Hope (backstage, 7); AJ Odudu (backstage, 8–10)
United Kingdom	The Voice Kids	ITV^{24} Website	Season 1, 2017: Jess Folley; Season 2, 2018: Daniel Davies; Season 3, 2019: Sam Wilkinson; Season 4, 2020: Justine Afante; Season 5, 2021: Torrin Cuthill; Season 6, 2022: Israella Chris; Season 7, 2023: Shanice & Andrea Nyandoro	will.i.am (1–7); Pixie Lott (1–7); Danny Jones (1–7); Jessie J (3); Paloma Faith (4); Melanie C (5); Ronan Keating (6–7)	Emma Willis (1–7); Cel Spellman (backstage, 1); Vick Hope (backstage, 2); AJ Odudu (backstage, 3–5)
United Kingdom; Wales	Y Llais(Welsh); The Voice	S4C	Season 1, 2025: Rose Datta; Season 2, 2026: Carrie Sauce; Season 3, 2027: Upcoming season	Bryn Terfel; Aleighcia Scott; Yws Gwynedd; Bronwen Lewis	Current; Steffan Powell (3–); Former; Sian Eleri (1–2)
United States and Caribbean countries	The Voice^{8}(English)	NBC; Website	Season 1, 2011: Javier Colon; Season 2, Spring 2012: Jermaine Paul; Season 3, Fall 2012: Cassadee Pope; Season 4, Spring 2013: Danielle Bradbery; Season 5, Fall 2013: Tessanne Chin; Season 6, Spring 2014: Josh Kaufman; Season 7, Fall 2014: Craig Wayne Boyd; Season 8, Spring 2015: Sawyer Fredericks; Season 9, Fall 2015: Jordan Smith; Season 10, Spring 2016: Alisan Porter; Season 11, Fall 2016: Sundance Head; Season 12, Spring 2017: Chris Blue; Season 13, Fall 2017: Chloe Kohanski; Season 14, Spring 2018: Brynn Cartelli; Season 15, Fall 2018: Chevel Shepherd; Season 16, Spring 2019: Maelyn Jarmon; Season 17, Fall 2019: Jake Hoot; Season 18, Spring 2020: Todd Tilghman; Season 19, Fall 2020: Carter Rubin; Season 20, Spring 2021: Cam Anthony; Season 21, Fall 2021: Girl Named Tom; Season 22, 2022: Bryce Leatherwood; Season 23, Spring 2023: Gina Miles; Season 24, Fall 2023: Huntley; Season 25, Spring 2024: Asher HaVon; Season 26, Fall 2024: Sofronio Vasquez; Season 27, Spring 2025: Adam David; Season 28, Fall 2025: Aiden Ross; Season 29, Spring 2026: Alexia Jayy; Season 30, Fall 2026: Current season; Season 31, Spring 2027: Upcoming season; Season 32, Fall 2027: Upcoming season	Current; Kelly Clarkson (14–21, 23, 29–30); Adam Levine (1–16, 27, 29–30); Riley Green (30–); Queen Latifah (30–); Former; CeeLo Green (1–3, 5); Shakira (4, 6); Usher (4, 6); Christina Aguilera (1–3, 5, 8, 10); Pharrell Williams (7–10); Miley Cyrus (11, 13); Alicia Keys (11–12, 14); Jennifer Hudson (13, 15); Nick Jonas (18, 20); Ariana Grande (21); Camila Cabello (22); Blake Shelton (1–23); Chance the Rapper (23, 25); Dan + Shay (duo, 25); Gwen Stefani (7, 9, 12, 17, 19, 22, 24, 26); Kelsea Ballerini (27); Michael Bublé (26–28); Niall Horan (23–24, 28); Reba McEntire (24–26, 28); Snoop Dogg (26, 28); John Legend (16–22, 24–25, 27, 29); Comeback Stage; Kelsea Ballerini (comeback stage, 15)^{19}; Bebe Rexha (comeback stage, 16)^{19}; Guest coaches; Kelsea Ballerini (battles, 20); Dan + Shay (duo, knockouts, 24); Jennifer Hudson (battles, 29); Upcoming; Joe Jonas (31–)	Current; Carson Daly (1–30); Former; Alison Haislip (backstage, 1); Christina Milian (backstage, 2–4); Upcoming; Keke Palmer (31)
United States and Caribbean countries	La Voz Kids (Spanish)^{25} The Voice Kids	Telemundo; Website	Season 1, 2013: Paola Guanche; Season 2, 2014: Amanda Mena; Season 3, 2015: Jonael Santiago; Season 4, 2016: Christopher Rivera	Paulina Rubio (1); Roberto Tapia (1–2); Prince Royce (1–2); Natalia Jiménez (2–4); Daddy Yankee (3–4); Pedro Fernández (3–4)	Jorge Bernal (1–4); Daisy Fuentes (1–3); Patricia Manterola (4)
United States and Caribbean countries	La Voz(Spanish); The Voice	Telemundo; Website	Season 1, 2019: Jeidimar Rijos; Season 2, 2020: Sammy Colon	Luis Fonsi (1–2); Alejandra Guzmán (1–2); Wisin (1–2); Carlos Vives (1–2); Mau y Ricky (duo, comeback stage, 2)^{19}	Jorge Bernal; Jacqueline Bracamontes; Jéssica Cediel (backstage, 1); Nastassja Bolívar (backstage, 2)
Uruguay	La Voz Uruguay; The Voice Uruguay	Canal 10	Season 1, 2022: Oscar Collazo; Season 2, 2023: Federico Garat; Season 3, 2024: Marcos Agüero	Current; Agustín Casanova; Valeria Lynch; Luana Persíncula (3–); Former; Lucas Sugo (1–2); Rubén Rada^{†} (1–3)	Current; Noelia Etcheverry (3–); Former; Natalia Oreiro (1–2)
Uruguay	La Voz Kids; The Voice Kids	Canal 10	Season 1, 2023: Sol Muñóz; Season 2, 2025: Valentina Sosa	Current; Agustín Casanova; Luana Persíncula (2–); Former; Valeria Lynch (1); Alex Ubago (1); Rubén Rada^{†} & Julieta Rada (duo, 1); Rubén Rada^{†} (solo, 2)	Noelia Etcheverry; Rafa Cotelo (backstage, 1); Daniel Ketchedjian (backstage, 2)
Uzbekistan	OVoz; The Voice of Uzbekistan	Zo'r TV	Season 1, 2024: Shohruxmirzo G’aniyev; Season 2, 2026: Diyora Jafarova	Current; Farrukh Zokirov; Shohruxxon (2–); Nasiba Abdullaeva (2–); Anvar Juraev (2–); Former; Ozodbek Nazarbekov (1); Sevara Nazarkhan (1); Tohir Sodiqov (1)	Mirshakar Fayzulloyev
Uzbekistan	OVoz Bolalar; The Voice Kids	Zo'r TV	Season 1, 2024: Qodirjon Valijonov; Season 2, 2027: Upcoming season	Current; TBA (2–); TBA (2–); TBA (2–); Former; Sevara Nazarkhan (1); DJ Piligrim (1); Botir Qodirov (1)	Jahongir Xo’jayev Khusnora Shadieva
Uzbekistan	OVoz 50+ The Voice 50+	Zo'r TV	Season 1, 2025: O'lmas Olloberganov	Farrukh Zokirov; Kumush Razzoqova; DJ Piligrim	Mirshakar Fayzulloyev
Uzbekistan	OVoz O'smirlar; The Voice Teens	Zo'r TV	Season 1, 2025: Laylo	Shohruxxon; Anvar Juraev; Kumush Razzoqova	Mirshakar Fayzulloyev
Vietnam	Giọng hát Việt; The Voice of Vietnam	VTV3; VTV3 HD; Website	Season 1, 2012–13: Phạm Thị Hương Tràm; Season 2, 2013: Vũ Thảo My; Season 3, 2015: Đức Phúc; Season 4, 2017: Ali Hoàng Dương; Season 5, 2018: Trần Ngọc Ánh; Season 6, 2019: Hoàng Đức Thịnh	Trần Lập^{†} (1); Hồ Ngọc Hà (1); Mỹ Linh (2); Hồng Nhung (2); Quốc Trung (2); Đàm Vĩnh Hưng (1–3); Mỹ Tâm (3); Thu Minh (1, 4); Đông Nhi (4); Tóc Tiên (4–5); Noo Phước Thịnh (4–5); Thu Phương (3, 5); Lam Trường (5); Tuấn Hưng (3, 6); Tuấn Ngọc (6); Thanh Hà (6); Hồ Hoài Anh (special coach, 6)	Phan Anh (1–3); Nguyên Khang (4); Phí Linh (5–6); Phương Mai (backstage, 1); V.Music band (backstage, 1); Yumi Dương (backstage, 2); Phạm Mỹ Linh (backstage, 3); Tim (backstage, 4); Đặng Quỳnh Chi (backstage, 4); Ali Hoàng Dương (backstage-blind audition, 5–6)
Vietnam	Giọng hát Việt nhí The Voice Kids of Vietnam	VTV3; VTV3 HD; Website	Season 1, 2013: Nguyễn Quang Anh; Season 2, 2014: Nguyễn Thiện Nhân; Season 3, 2015: Trịnh Nguyễn Hồng Minh; Season 4, 2016: Trịnh Nhật Minh; Season 5, 2017: Dương Ngọc Ánh; Season 6, 2018: Hà Quỳnh Như; Season 7, 2019: Kiều Minh Tâm	Hiền Thục (1); Thanh Bùi (1); Cẩm Ly (2–3); Lam Trường (2); Dương Khắc Linh (solo, 3); Noo Phước Thịnh (4); Đông Nhi & Ông Cao Thắng (duo, 4); Vũ Cát Tường (solo, 4–5); Soobin Hoàng Sơn (solo, 5); Hương Tràm & Tiên Cookie (duo, 5); Hồ Hoài Anh & Lưu Hương Giang (duo, 1–3, 6); Khắc Hưng & Bảo Anh (duo, 6); Soobin Hoàng Sơn & Vũ Cát Tường (duo, 6); Ali Hoàng Dương & Lưu Thiên Hương (duo, 7); Dương Cầm & Hương Giang (duo, 7); Dương Khắc Linh & Phạm Quỳnh Anh (duo, 7)	Thanh Thảo (1); Trấn Thành (1); Thanh Bạch (2–3); Ngô Kiến Huy (4); Thành Trung (5); Phí Linh (6); Ali Hoàng Dương (6); Khả Ngân (7); Gil Lê (7); Thanh Duy (backstage, 2); Jennifer Phạm (backstage, 2); Hoàng Oanh (backstage, 3); Chi Pu (backstage, 4); Đặng Quỳnh Chi (backstage, 5)

=== Notes ===
1. ^1 The Voice of Albania is also broadcast in Kosovo. People from Kosovo are also allowed to join the show and vote.
2. ^2 The Chinese version allowed people who could speak Mandarin to join the competition, starting from season three. In 2016, there was a controversial issue between the producers of the Chinese version and Talpa on the copyrights of The Voice of China. Therefore, the show was rebranded as Sing! China, and is no longer part of The Voice franchise.
3. ^3 While La Voix is broadcast all across Canada, people from provinces outside Quebec (excluding those from the Ottawa/Gatineau area and English-speaking communities at New Brunswick) are not allowed to join the show.
4. ^4 The Voice of Greece is also broadcast in Cyprus. Cypriots are also allowed to join the show.
5. ^5 The Voice Angola is also broadcast in Mozambique. People from Mozambique are allowed to join the show.
6. ^6 In the Australian version of The Voice, Joel Madden served as a solo coach from season one to three. On seasons four and five, he was joined by his brother Benji Madden, and became as a duo coach called "The Madden Brothers". Similar in the Turkish version of The Voice, Gökhan Özoğuz also served as a solo coach from season three to four, before he was joined by Hakan Özoğuz for the following two seasons. But then, Gökhan goes as solo coach in the later seasons.
7. ^7 Season two of Turkish The Voice Kids was the first season to have four coaches among all versions of The Voice Kids. Afterwards, other versions around the world have added a fourth coach too.
8. ^8 English-American The Voice is also broadcast in Canada and some Caribbean countries and territories; people from all Canadian provinces (excluding Quebec) and from select Caribbean countries are allowed to join the show.
9. ^9 South African network M-Net is not to be confused with South Korean music channel Mnet.
10. ^10 Vocea României is also broadcast in Moldova; Moldovans are allowed to join the show, provided they have a biometric passport or a visa.
11. ^11 The Voice of Italy is also broadcast in San Marino and Vatican. However, people from Vatican City are not allowed to join the show.
12. ^12 The Voice – la plus belle voix is also broadcast in Luxembourg and Monaco. People from these countries can participate on the show.
13. ^13 Spanish La Voz is also broadcast in Andorra. People from Andorra are also allowed to join the show.
14. ^14 Although the Kazakh, Russian, and Ukrainian versions are never broadcast in the CIS area, people from other CIS countries (including Russia, Kazakhstan, and Ukraine) are allowed to join these shows.
15. ^15 A "supercoach" was introduced in the fourth season of Spanish La Voz Kids, who decided who should proceed to the next round. David Bisbal was the supercoach in that season.
16. ^16 Voice – Danmarks største stemme is also broadcast in Faroe Islands and Greenland. People from these countries are allowed to join the show.
17. ^17 The Belgian-Flemish version of The Voice Kids introduced a trio coach, which was the first in the franchise's history. A trio was also featured in the first season of Lithuania's Lietuvos balsas. Kartos.
18. ^18 La Voz Argentina is also broadcast in Uruguay. People from Uruguay are allowed to join the show.
19. ^19 In the fifteenth season of the English-American The Voice, a new round, called "The Comeback Stage", was created. It featured a fifth coach that saved eliminated contestants to have a second chance on the show. Several countries adapted this round to their respective versions.
20. ^20 In season two of The Voice Afrique Francophone, A'salfo and Charlotte Dipanda originally signed up to serve as coaches full-time. However, due to a postponement which made the season finished later than planned, A'salfo and Dipanda were not able to resume their duties for the last four live shows because of pre-arranged commitments. Youssoupha and Josey replaced them, respectively, and served as coaches until the end of the season. In the third season, Youssoupha returned once again as coach to replace Nayanka Bell for the live shows, who was unable to return due to the COVID-19 pandemic.
21. ^21 The Voice India is also broadcast in Sri Lanka. People from Sri Lanka are allowed to join the show.
22. ^22 Following the fraud scandal on the finale of Russian's The Voice Kids season six, the broadcaster closed the investigation by stating that there had been fraud and announced that it canceled the results. The producer announced that the nine finalists are all winners of the season.
23. ^23 The Voice Indonesia is also broadcast in East Timor. People from East Timor are allowed to join the show.
24. ^24 United Kingdom's ITV is not to be confused with Azerbaijan's itv network.
25. ^25 This country featured a kids' version before producing a regular edition.
26. ^26 First time in the history of The Voice franchise that a winner of a kids' version wins the adult version, a few years later, in the same country and with the same coach.
27. ^27 For the first and, so far, only time in the whole franchise, the finalists were all from the same team.
28. ^28 Due to the COVID-19 pandemic, Filipino's The Voice Teens declared one champion per team: Heart Salvador, Cydel Gabutero, Kendra Aguirre and Isang Manlapaz.
29. ^29 To celebrate the 10-year-anniversary of France's The Voice – la plus belle voix, an All-stars version was produced and it had five individual coaches. The All-stars format was then adapted in Finland, where it only featured three coaches.
30. ^30 For the first time in the history of The Voice, Australia was the first country to dedicate a version for family groups, who come to sing together, under the name The Voice Generations.
31. ^31 Longest produced series in the history of the entire franchise.
32. ^32 First ever series on the franchise to only have two coaches.
33. ^33 First ever series on the regular edition to only have three coaches.

== The X Factor ==
Franchise that is currently airing
Franchise that is not currently airing, but is slated to return in the future
Franchise that has ended
Franchise that was cancelled during production
Franchise whose status is unknown

Country/Region	Local title	Network	Hosts	Judges	Winner
Albania; Kosovo	X Factor	TV Klan	Alketa Vejsiu	Current; TBA (7–); TBA (7–); TBA (7–); TBA (7–); Former; Pandi Laço (1–4); Alban Skënderaj (1–4); Vesa Luma (1); Juliana Pasha (1); Altuna Sejdiu (2–3); Miriam Cani (4); Bleona Qereti (4); Adi Krasta (5–6); Arilena Ara (5–6); Young Zerka (5–6); Elhaida Dani (5; judges' houses, 6); Soni Malaj (2–3; live shows, 6)	Season 1, 2012: Sheila Haxhiraj; Season 2, 2012–13: Arilena Ara; Season 3, 2013–14: Ergi Dini; Season 4, 2015: Edea Demaliaj; Season 5, 2023–24: Alis Kallaçi; Season 6, 2024–25: Rigersa Loka; Season 7, 2026–27: Upcoming season
Albania; Kosovo	X Factor Kids	TV Klan	Alketa Vejsiu	Bojken Lako; Fifi; Oriola Marashi; Pirro Çako	Season 1, 2025–26: Eden Dani
Algeria	X Factor El Djazair	Echorouk TV	Racha Mokrane	Cheb Mami; Fella Ababsa; Soolking	Season 1, 2026: Upcoming season
Arab world	The X Factor سير النجاحX	Current; Dubai TV (5–); Former; Rotana (1–2); CBC (3); MBC1 (4)	Current; Sheema (5–); Former; Nathalie Maamary (1); Joelle Rahme (1–2); Yosra El Lozy (3); Bassel Alzaro (3–4); Wael Mansour (4); Daniella Rahme (4)	Current; Ragheb Alama (4–); Rahma Riad (6–); Fayez Al Saeed (6–); Former; Nelly (1); Michel Elefteriades (1–2); Khaled El Sheikh (1–2); Anoushka (2); Carole Samaha (3); Hussain Al Jasmi (3); Wael Kfoury (3); Elissa (3–4); Donia Samir Ghanem (4); Angham (5); Abdallah Al Rowaished (5)	Season 1, 2006: Rajaa Kasabni; Season 2, 2007: Muhammad El Majzoub; Season 3, 2013: Mohammed Rifi; Season 4, 2015: Hamza Hawsawi; Season 5, 2023–24: Haneen Elshater; Season 6, 2024–25: Abdulrahim Al-Halabi; Season 7, TBA: Awaiting Confirmation
Armenia	ԻՔՍ–ՖԱԿՏՈՐ; X–Factor	Shant TV	Aram Mp3 (1–2); Grisha Aghakhanyan (3–4); Avet Barseghyan (3)	Egor Glumov (1, 3); Garik Papoyan (1–4); Gisane Palyan (1–2); Naira Gyurjinyan (1–2); André (2–4); Emmy (3); Erik Karapetyan (4); Shushanik Arevshatyan (4)	Season 1, 2010–11: Vrezh Kirakosyan; Season 2, 2012–13: Kim Grigoryan; Season 3, 2014: Vahé Margaryan; Season 4, 2016–17: Edgar Ghandilyan
Armenia	X Factor Kids	Shant TV	Gohar Gasparyan; Anahit Grigoryan	André; Emmy; Masha	Season 1, 2026: Current season
Australia	The X Factor	Network Ten (1); Seven Network (2–8)	Daniel MacPherson (1); Luke Jacobz (2–7); Jason Dundas (8); Chloe Maxwell (The Xtra Factor, 1); Natalie Garonzi (The Xtra Factor, 2)	Mark Holden (1); Kate Ceberano (1); John Reid (1); Guy Sebastian (2–4, 7–8); Natalie Imbruglia (2); Ronan Keating (2–6); Kyle Sandilands (2); Natalie Bassingthwaighte (3–6); Mel B (3–4, 8); Dannii Minogue (5–7); Redfoo (5–6); James Blunt (7); Chris Isaak (7); Iggy Azalea (8); Adam Lambert (8)	Season 1, 2005: Random; Season 2, 2010: Altiyan Childs; Season 3, 2011: Reece Mastin; Season 4, 2012: Samantha Jade; Season 5, 2013: Dami Im; Season 6, 2014: Marlisa Punzalan; Season 7, 2015: Cyrus Villanueva; Season 8, 2016: Isaiah Firebrace
Balkan countries; Bosnia and Herzegovina; Croatia; Macedonia; Montenegro; Serbia	X Factor Adria	TV Sitel (1–2); Federalna (1–2); RTV Pink (1); RTL Televizija (2); Prva (2); RTRS (2)	Ana Grubin (live shows, 1); Bane Jevtić (Auditions, backstage, 1); Snezana Velkov (Auditions, backstage, 1); Una Senić (X Star, judges' houses, 1); Antonija Blaće (selection process, live shows, 2); Aleksandar Radojičić (selection process, live shows, 2); Nikolina Pišek (backstage, 2)	Željko Joksimović (1–2); Emina Jahović (1); Kiki Lesendrić (1); Kristina Kovač (1); Aleksandra Kovač (2); Massimo Savić^{†} (2); Tonči Huljić (2)	Season 1, 2013–14: Daniel Kajmakoski; Season 2, 2015: Amel Ćurić
Belarus	Current; Factor BY (2–); Former; X Factor Belarus (1)	Belteleradiocompany	Vladimir Bogdan; Marianna Murenkova	Current; Olga Buzova; Denis Klyaver (4–); Stanislav Yarushin (4–); Vladimir Gromov (4–); Former; Sergey Sosedov^{†} (1–2); Ruslan Alekhno (1–3); Seryoga (1–3); Yosyf Pryhozhyn (3)	2020: Cancelled (Note: X Factor Belarus was planned to start in 2020 with a final on 31 December 2020. After completed pre-auditions in Hrodna, Mahilyow and Homiel, the production team behind X Factor Belarus had to cancel the auditions in Vitebsk in early April because of local COVID-19 pandemic regulations. On 4 April, the production team cancelled all further auditions and later announced there would be no more auditions until late May. In July 2020, the Instagram account of X Factor Belarus asked auditionees for patience. Since then, any update on the future of the show lacks.); Season 1, 2021: Andrey Panisov (Note: X Factor Belarus was planned to start in 2020 with a final on 31 December 2020. After failing to produce the show in 2020, the official X Factor Belarus Instagram account announced the show would return for a new audition round in March 2021. The proposed date for the final was again set for New Year's Eve.); Season 2, 2022–23: Ivan Dyatlov; Season 3, 2023–24: Danyil Savenia; Season 4, 2024–25: Vitaliy Bogdanov; Season 5, 2025–26: Ibragim Karasov; Season 6, 2026–27: Upcoming season
Belarus	Factor BY: Children	Belteleradiocompany	Sergey Minaev; Elena Meraai	Nkeeei; Anastasia Kravchenko; Alexey Vorobyov; Zara	Season 1, 2026: Vlad Tabola
Belgium	X Factor	vtm	Koen Wauters (1); Hadise (2)	Kris Wauters (1–2); Jean Blaute (1); Liliane Saint-Pierre (1); Maurice Engelen (2); Do (2)	Season 1, 2005: Udo Mechels; Season 2, 2008: Dirk De Smet
Bolivia	Factor X Bolivia	Red Uno	Carlos Rocabado; Ximena Zalzer	Ángel López (1); Andrés Barba (1–2); Mayra Gonzales (1–2); Matamba (2); Chris Syler (1–2)	Season 1, 2018: Juan Lovera; Season 2, 2019: DÚO MÍA
Brazil	X Factor	Band; Website; TNT	Fernanda Paes Leme (X Factor); Maurício Meirelles (Pré-Factor)	Rick Bonadio; Alinne Rosa; Di Ferrero; Paulo Miklos	Season 1, 2016: Cristopher Clark
Bulgaria	X Factor	Nova TV; Website	Deo (1); Maria Ignatova (2–5); Alexandra Raeva (2–5)	Maga (1); Maria Ilieva (1–3); Poli Genova (1); Vasko Vasilev (1); Lubo Kirov (2–3, 5); Sanya Armutlieva (2–5); Zaki (2–3, 5); Krisko (4–5); Lucy Diakovska (4); Magarditch Halvadjian (4)	Season 1, 2011: Raffi Boghosyan; Season 2, 2013: Zhana Bergendorff; Season 3, 2014–15: Slavin Slavchev; Season 4, 2015–16: Christiana Louizu; Season 5, 2017: 4 Magic
Cambodia	X Factor Cambodia	Hangmeas; Website	Chea Vibol; Chan Keonimol	Aok Sokunkanha; Khemarak Sereymun; Nop Bayyareth; Sok Seylalin	Season 1, 2019: Chan Sopanha
Chile	Factor X	TVN; Website	Julián Elfenbein	Tito Beltrán (1–2); Karen Doggenweiler (1–2); Zeta Bosio (1); Mon Laferte (2); José Luis Rodríguez (2)	Season 1, 2011: Sergio Járlaz; Season 2, 2012: Juan Gabriel Valenzuela
China	The X Factor: Ji Qing Chang Xiang The X Factor 激情唱响; The X Factor: Passionate Singer (1); The X Factor: 中国最强音; The X Factor: China's Strongest Voice (2)	Liaoning TV (1); HBS:Hunan TV (2)	Da Zuo (1); Shao Wenjie (1); Zhu Dan (2); He Jiong (2)	Angie Chai Chih–ping (1); Aduo (1); Chen Ming (1); Chen Yufan (1); Eason Chan Yik–shun (2); Lo Ta-yu (2); Zheng Jun (2); Zhang Ziyi (3)	Season 1, 2011: Li Shangshang; Season 2, 2012: Chen Yumeng
Colombia	El Factor X The X Factor	RCN TV; Website	Andrea Serna (1–3); Karen Martínez (4); Mauricio Vélez (4); Laura González (5–)	Current; José Gaviria; Rosana (4–); Piso 21 (4–); Carolina Gaitán (5–); Former; Marbelle (1–3); Juan Carlos Coronel (1–3)	Season 1, 2005: Julio César Meza; Season 2, 2006: Francisco Villarreal; Season 3, 2009: Siam; Season 4, 2021: Madeiro (José David Madero); Season 5, 2022: Heyner Usprung; Season 6, TBA: Awaiting Confirmation
Colombia	El Factor X: Batalla de las Estrellas; The X Factor: Battle of the Stars	RCN TV; Website	Andrea Serna	Marbelle; José Gaviria; Juan Carlos Coronel	Season 1, 2006: Luz Amparo Álvarez
Colombia	El Factor Xs	RCN TV; Website	Andrea Serna	Marbelle; José Gaviria; Juan Carlos Coronel (1, 3); Wilfrido Vargas (2)	Season 1, 2006: Andres Camilo Hurtado; Season 2, 2007: Camilo Echeverry Correa; Season 3, 2011: Shaira Selena Peláez
Colombia	El Factor X Familia	RCN TV; Website	Andrea Serna	Marbelle; José Gaviria; Juan Carlos Coronel; Reykon	Season 1, 2015: Dúo Herencia
Czech Republic	X Factor	TV Nova; Website	Leoš Mareš	Gabriela Osvaldová; Ondřej Soukup; Petr Janda	Season 1, 2008: Jiří Zonyga
Czech Republic; Slovakia	X Factor	Prima family Website; TV JOJ; Website	Martin Rausch	Celeste Buckingham; Ondřej Brzobohatý; Sisa Sklovská; Oto Klempíř	Season 1, 2014: Peter Bažík
Denmark	X Factor	Current; TV 2 (12–); Former; DR (1–11)	Current; Maria Fantino (17–); Former; Lise Rønne (1–2, 4–5, 14 Live Shows); Signe Muusman (3); Signe Molde (6); Eva Harlou (7–8); Sofie Linde Ingversen (9–16); Joakim Ingversen (11 from 1st to 2nd live shows); Melvin Kakooza (14 Bootcamp); Emil Thorup (Xtra Factor, 6); Thomas Skov (X Factor Backstage, 8); Joakim Ingversen (Ultra Factor, 9–11); Jacob Riising (Ultra Factor, 11); Rasmus Brohave (Z Factor, 12)	Current; Thomas Blachman (1–2, 4–); Drew Sycamore (19–); Benjamin Hav (19–); Former; Lina Rafn (1–2, 7–8); Remee (1–3, 7–11); Soulshock (3); Pernille Rosendahl (3–5); Cutfather (4–5); Ida Corr (6); Anne Linnet (6); Mette Lindberg (9–10); Sanne Salomonsen (11); Oh Land (12–14, 17–18); Ankerstjerne (12–13); Martin Jensen (14–15); Kwamie Liv (15–16); Simon Kvamm (16–18)	Season 1, 2008: Martin Hoberg Hedegaard; Season 2, 2009: Linda Andrews; Season 3, 2010: Thomas Ring Petersen; Season 4, 2011: Sarah Skaalum Jørgensen; Season 5, 2012: Ida Østergaard Madsen; Season 6, 2012–13: Chresten Falck Damborg; Season 7, 2014: Anthony Jasmin; Season 8, 2015: Emilie Esther; Season 9, 2016: Embrace; Season 10, 2016–17: Morten Nørgaard; Season 11, 2018: Place on Earth; Season 12, 2019: Kristian Kjærlund; Season 13, 2020: Alma Agger; Season 14, 2021: Solveig Lindelof; Season 15, 2022: Mads Moldt; Season 16, 2023: ROSÉL; Season 17, 2024: Helene Frank; Season 18, 2024–25: Leslie Nguyen; Season 19, 2026: Hugo Almeida; Season 20, 2027: Upcoming Season
Ecuador	Factor X Kids Ecuador	Ecuavisa	Ursula Strenge	Jorge Luis del Hierro (1); Pamela Cortéz (1); Maykel Cedeño (1)	Season 1, 2015: Celena Rosero
Finland	X Factor	MTV3	Heikki Paasonen (1); Ile Uusivuori (2); Viivi Pumpanen (2); Jukka Rossi (Xtra Factor, 1)	Linda Brava (1); Renne Korppila (1); Gugi Kokljuschkin (1); Saara Aalto (2); Michael Monroe (2); Mikael Gabriel (2); Suvi Teräsniska (2)	Season 1, 2010: Elias Hämäläinen; Season 2, 2018: Tika Liljegren
France	X Factor	W9 (1); M6 (2); RTL–TVI	Alexandre Devoise (1); Sandrine Corman (2); Jérôme Anthony (F@n Factor, 2)	Marc Cerrone (1); Julie Zenatti (1); Alain Lanty (1); Henry Padovani (2); Olivier Schultheis (2); Véronic DiCaire (2); Christophe Willem (2)	Season 1, 2009: Sébastien Agius; Season 2, 2011: Matthew Raymond-Barker
Georgia	X Factor Georgia; X ფაქტორი	Rustavi 2 (1–4); Imedi TV (5)	Gega Palavandishvili (1); la Sukhitashvili (1); Giorgi Kipshidze (2); Ruska Makashvili (3–5); Erekle Getsadze (3); Vaniko Tarkhnishvili (4–5)	Giorgi Gabunia (1–4); Tamta (1–2, 5); Sopho Toroshelidze (1); Stephane Mgebrishvili (1, 4–5); Sofia Nizharadze (2–4); Anri Jokhadze (2, 5); Nina Sublatti (3); Nika Gvaramia (3); Dato Porchkhidze (3); Lela Tsurtsumia (4); Naniko Khazaradze (5); Dato Evgenidze (5)	Season 1, 2014: Tornike Kipiani; Season 2, 2015: Giorgi Nakashidze; Season 3, 2016: Avto Abeslamidze; Season 4, 2017: Sandro Kurcxalidze; Season 5, 2018: Anri Guchmanidze
Germany	X Factor	VOX (1–3); Sky 1 (4)	Jochen Schropp (1–3); Charlotte Würdig (4); Bence Istenes (4); Janin Reinhardt (backstage, 2)	Sarah Connor (1–3); Till Brönner (1–2); George Glueck (1); Das Bo (2); Sandra Nasic (3); HP Baxxter (3); Moses Pelham (3); Sido (4); Iggy Uriarte (4); Jennifer Rostock (4); Thomas Anders (4)	Season 1, 2010: Edita Abdieski; Season 2, 2011: David Pfeffer; Season 3, 2012: Mrs. Greenbird; Season 4, 2018: EES & The Yes-Ja! Band
Greece; Cyprus	The X Factor	ANT1 (1–3); Skai TV (4–5); Sigma TV (4–5); Open TV (6); Omega (6); Mega TV (7); Alpha TV Cyprus (7)	Sakis Rouvas (1–5); Despina Vandi (6); Giorgos Lianos (auditions, 1–3); Despina Kampouri (auditions, 1–2); Maria Sinatsaki (auditions, 3); Evangelia Aravani (backstage, 4–5); Aris Makris (backstage, 6); Andreas Georgiou (7); Ilias Bogdanos (backstage, 7); Katerina Lioliou (backstage, 7)	Giorgos Theofanous (1–4, 6); George Levendis (1–3); Katerina Gagaki (1–3); Nikos Mouratidis (1–3); Tamta (4–5); Peggy Zina (4); Thodoris Marantinis (4); Giorgos Papadopoulos (5); Babis Stokas (5); Giorgos Mazonakis† (5); Melina Aslanidou (6); Michael Tsaousopoulos (6); Christos Mastoras (6–7); Mariza Rizou (7); Michalis Kouinelis (7); Stelios Rokkos (7)	Season 1, 2008–09: Loukas Giorkas; Season 2, 2009–10: Stavros Michalakakos; Season 3, 2010–11: Haris Antoniou; Season 4, 2016: Andreas Leontas; Season 5, 2017: Panagiotis Koufogiannis; Season 6, 2019: Giannis Grosis; Season 7, 2022: Katerina Lazaridou
Hungary	X-Faktor	RTL; Website	Current; Babett Köllő (14–); Márk Ember (14–); Former; Nóra Ördög (1–3); Balázs Sebestyén (1); Lilu (4); Bence Istenes (4–6); Ramóna Kiss (7–9); Dávid Miller (10–13); Joci Pápai (12–13); Dóra Kovács (backstage, 6); Alexandra Koholák (backstage, 7); Zsófi Szabó (backstage, 8–9)	Current; Laci Gáspár (6–); ByeAlex (6–11,14–); Péter Majoros (12–); Solére (14–); Former; Peti Puskás (6–11); Erika Herceg (11); Péter Geszti (1–4); Ildikó Keresztes (1–3); Miklós Malek (1–3); Feró Nagy (1–3); Róbert Alföldi (4–5); Róbert Szikora (4–5); Gabi Tóth (4–6); Little G Weevil (5); Gigi Radics (7–8); Bogi Dallos (9); Adél Csobot (10); Andrea Tóth (12–13); Milán Valkusz (12–13)	Season 1, 2010: Csaba Vastag; Season 2, 2011: Tibor Kocsis; Season 3, 2012: Gergő Oláh; Season 4, 2013: Dóra Danics; Season 5, 2014: Andi Tóth; Season 6, 2016: Barbara Opitz; Season 7, 2017: Ricco & Claudia; Season 8, 2018: USNK; Season 9, 2019: Tibor Ruszó; Season 10, 2021: ALEE; Season 11, 2022: Bernadett Solyom; Season 12, 2024: Krisztián Fehér; Season 13, 2025: Belano; Season 14, 2026: Current season
Iceland	X Factor	Stöð 2 Website	Halla Vilhjálmsdóttir (1)	Einar Bárðarson (1); Elínborg Halldórsdóttir (1); Páll Óskar Hjálmtýsson (1)	Season 1, 2006–07: Jógvan Hansen
India	X Factor India	Sony Entertainment TV; Website	Aditya Narayan	Sonu Nigam; Shreya Ghoshal; Sanjay Leela Bhansali	Season 1, 2011: Geet Sagar
Indonesia	X Factor Indonesia	RCTI; Website	Robby Purba	Judika (3–4); Marcello Tahitoe (4); Bunga Citra Lestari (3–4); Ariel "Noah" (3–4); Vidi Aldiano^{†} (4); Anggun (1); Ahmad Dhani (1–2); Bebi Romeo (1–2); Rossa (1–3); Afgan (2); Anang Hermansyah (3)	Season 1, 2012–13: Fatin Shidqia; Season 2, 2015: Jebe & Petty; Season 3, 2021–22: Alvin Jonathan; Season 4, 2023–24: Peter Holly
Iran	Stage	Manoto	Raha Etemadi	Shahram Azar; Hamed Nikpay; Babak Saeedi; Reza Rohani	Season 1, 2016: Amirhossein Eftekhari; Season 2, 2017: Alireza Saremi
Israel	The X Factor ישראל; The X Factor Israel	Channel 2 (1–2); Reshet (1–2); Reshet 13 (3–4); Website	Current; Liron Weizman (4-); Former; Bar Refaeli (1-3)	Current; Simon Cowell (5–); Jason Ritter (5–); Kristen Schaal (5–); Ran Danker (4–); Aviv Geffen (4–); Former; Moshe Peretz (1–3); Ivri Lider (1–3); Rami Fortis (1–2); Shiri Maimon (1–3); Subliminal (3); Netta Barzilai (4); Ran Danker (4); Aviv Geffen (4); Margol (4); Miri Mesika (4)	Season 1, 2013–14: Rose Fostanes; Season 2, 2015: Daniel Yafe; Season 3, 2017–18: Eden Alene; Season 4, 2021–22: Michael Ben David; Season 5, 2026: Upcoming Season
Italy	X Factor	Current; Sky Uno (5–); TV8 (9–); Website; Former; Rai 2 (1–4)	Current; Giorgia (18–); Former; Francesca Michielin (16-17); Ludovico Tersigni (15); Alessandro Cattelan (5–14); Francesco Facchinetti (1–4; Xtra Factor, 4); Alessandra Barzaghi (Xtra Factor, 4); Max Novaresi (Xtra Factor, 5–6); Brenda Lodigiani (Xtra Factor, 5–6); Matteo Bordone (Xtra Factor, 7–8); Mara Maionchi (Xtra Factor, 8–11); Aurora Ramazzotti (X Factor daily, 9–11); Daniela Collu (Xtra Factor, 9–13)	Current; Paola Iezzi (18–); Jake La Furia (18–); Francesco Gabbani (19–); Irama (20–); Former; Morgan (1–3, 5–8, 17); Mara Maionchi (1–4, 11–13); Simona Ventura (1–2, 5–7); Claudia Mori (3); Anna Tatangelo (4); Enrico Ruggeri (4); Elio (4–7, 9); Arisa (5–6, 10); Mika (7–9, 14–15); Victoria Cabello (8); Skin (9); Álvaro Soler (10); Levante (11); Asia Argento (12); Samuel (13); Malika Ayane (13); Sfera Ebbasta (13); Emma Marrone (14–15); Hell Raton (14–15); Rkomi (16); Fedez (8–12, 16–17); Ambra Angiolini (16–17); Dargen D'Amico (16–17); Manuel Agnelli (10-12, 14-15, 18); Achille Lauro (18–19)	Season 1, 2008: Aram Quartet; Season 2, 2008–09: Matteo Becucci; Season 3, 2009: Marco Mengoni; Season 4, 2010: Nathalie; Season 5, 2011: Francesca Michielin; Season 6, 2012: Chiara Galiazzo; Season 7, 2013: Michele Bravi; Season 8, 2014: Lorenzo Fragola; Season 9, 2015: Giosada; Season 10, 2016: Soul System; Season 11, 2017: Lorenzo Licitra; Season 12, 2018: Anastasio; Season 13, 2019: Sofia Tornambene; Season 14, 2020: Casadilego; Season 15, 2021: Baltimora; Season 16, 2022: Santi Francesi; Season 17, 2023: Sarafine; Season 18, 2024: Mimi Caruso; Season 19, 2025: Rob; Season 20, 2026: Current season
Japan	X Factor Okinawa Japan	Okinawa TV; Website	Jon Kabira; Naomi Watanabe	Kaz Utsunomiya; Rino Nakasone; Kiyoshi Matsuo	Season 1, 2013–14: Sky's the Limit
Kazakhstan	X Factor	Perviy Kanal Evraziya; Website	Current; Arnur Istybaev (2–6, 9 -); Former; Adil Liyan (1); Daniyar Dzumadilov (7–8)	Current; Nurbergen Makhambetov (5 from live–); Eva Becher (6, 9-); Dilnaz Akhmadieva (4–5, until live, 7, 9 -); Former; Nagima Eskalieva (1-8); Alexander Shevchenko (1–5); Sultana Karazhigitova (1–2, until live); Ismail Igіlmanov (2, from live); Erlan Kokeev (3); Anatoliy Tsoy (8)	Season 1, 2011: Dariya Gabdull; Season 2, 2012: Andrey Tikhonov; Season 3, 2013: Evgeniya Barysheva; Season 4, 2013: Kairat Kapanov; Season 5, 2014: Evgeny Vyblov; Season 6, 2015: Astana Kargabay; Season 7, 2018: Dilnura Birzhanova; Season 8, 2020–21: Bro; Season 9, 2022–23: Miras Erbolov; Season 10, 2023–24: Ulpan Zumabek; Season 11, TBA: Awaiting Confirmation
Latvia	X Faktors	TV3; Website	Markus Riva	Reinis Sējāns; Aija Auškāpa; Intars Busulis; Marats Ogļezņevs (3–)	Season 1, 2017: Artūrs Gruzdiņš; Season 2, 2018: Kattie; Season 3, 2019: Elīna Gluzunova; Season 4, 2021: Grēta Grantiņa; Season 5, 2023: Emilija Bērziņa; Season 6, 2025: Jurģis Namejs Zvejnieks
Lithuania	X Faktorius	TV3	Current; Mindaugas Stasiulis (5–); Mindaugas Rainys (5–); Former; Marijonas Mikutavičius (1); Martynas Starkus (2–4)	Current; Saulius Prūsaitis; Saulius Urbonavičius; Marijonas Mikutavičius (2–); Justina Arlauskaitė-Jazzu (3–); Former; Vytautas Šapranauskas (1); Rūta Ščiogolevaitė (1–2); Andrius Mamontovas (5, 7 (Note: As a one-off judge replacing Prūsaitis))	Season 1, 2012–13: Giedrė Vokietytė; Season 2, 2013–14: Žygimantas Gečas; Season 3, 2015–16: Monika Pundziūtė; Season 4, 2016–17: Iglė Bernotaitytė; Season 5, 2017–18: 120; Season 6, 2018–19: Good Time Boys; Season 7, 2019: Milda Martinkėnaitė; Season 8, 2021: Mando; Season 9, 2022: Spurr; Season 10, 2024: Atėnė Ravinkaitė
Lithuania	X Faktorius. Žvaigždės; X Factor. Stars	TV3	Mindaugas Stasiulis; Mindaugas Rainys	Saulius Prūsaitis; Saulius Urbonavičius; Marijonas Mikutavičius; Justina Arlauskaitė-Jazzu	Season 1, 2020: Milita Daikerytė
Malta	X Factor Malta	TVM	Current; Gianni Zammit (4–); Former; Ben Camille (1–3)	Current; Howard Keith Debono; Philippa Naudi (3, 5-); Amber Bondin (4–); Aleandro Spiteri Monsigneur (5–); Former; Ray Mercieca (1–2); Alexandra Alden (1–2); Ivan Grech (3); Ira Losco (1-4); Gianluca Bezzina (4)	Season 1, 2018–19: Michela Pace; Season 2, 2019–20: Destiny Chukunyere; Season 3, 2021–22: Ryan Hili; Season 4, 2023–24: Richard Aquilina; Season 5, 2026: Lisa Gauci
Myanmar	The X Factor Myanmar	MRTV 4	Zaw Htet (1); Hmu Thiha Thu (2)	Si Thu Lwin (1–2); Nge Nge (1–2); Eaint Chit (1); Za War (1–2); Zam Nuu (2)	Season 1, 2016: Htun Naung Sint; Season 2, 2017: David Derrick
Netherlands	X Factor	RTL 4 Website	Wendy van Dijk (1–4); Martijn Krabbe (2–5); Nathalie Bulters (Backstage, 3); Eva Treurniet (Backstage, 3); Lieke van Lexmond (Backstage, 4); Ferry Doedens (Backstage, 5)	Henkjan Smits (1); Marianne van Wijnkoop (1); Henk Temming (1); Eric van Tijn (2–4); Stacey Rookhuizen (2–4); Angela Groothuizen (2–5); Gordon Heuckeroth (2–5); Ali Bouali (5); Candy Dulfer (5)	Season 1, 2007: Sharon Kips; Season 2, 2009: Lisa Hordijk; Season 3, 2010: Jaap Reesema; Season 4, 2011: Rochelle Perts; Season 5, 2013: Haris Alagic
New Zealand	The X Factor	TV3; Website	Dominic Bowden; Guy Williams (The Xtra Factor, 2); Sharyn Casey (The Xtra Factor, 2); Clint Roberts (The Xtra Factor, 2); Caito Potatoe aka Caitlin Davidson (The X Factor RAW, 2)	Daniel Bedingfield (1); Ruby Frost (1); Stan Walker (1–2); Melanie Blatt (1–2); Natalia Kills (2); Willy Moon (2)	Season 1, 2013: Jackie Thomas; Season 2, 2015: Beau Monga
Norway	X Factor	TV 2	Charlotte Thorstvedt (1); Ravi (2); Guri Solberg (2); Peter Moi Brubresko (Xtra Factor); Katarina Flatland (Xtra Factor)	Jan Fredrik Karlsen; Mira Craig (1); Peter Peters (1); Elisabeth Andreassen (2); Marion Ravn (2); Klaus Sonstad (2)	Season 1, 2009: Chand Torsvik; Season 2, 2010: Hans Bollandsås
Philippines	The X Factor Philippines	ABS–CBN	KC Concepcion	Martin Nievera; Gary Valenciano; Pilita Corrales†; Jake Zyrus	Season 1, 2012: KZ Tandingan
Poland	X Factor	TVN; Website	Jarosław Kuźniar (1–2); Patricia Kazadi (3–4)	Czesław Mozil (1–4); Maja Sablewska (1); Kuba Wojewódzki (1–4); Tatiana Okupnik (2–4); Ewa Farna (4)	Season 1, 2011: Gienek Loska; Season 2, 2012: Dawid Podsiadło; Season 3, 2013: Klaudia Gawor; Season 4, 2014: Artem Furman
Portugal	Factor X	SIC	João Manzarra (1–2); Bárbara Guimarães (1); Cláudia Vieira (2); Carolina Torres (Factor Extra) (1–2); Tiago Silva (Factor F)	Sónia Tavares (1–2); Paulo Junqueiro (1–2); Paulo Ventura (1–2); Miguel Guedes (2)	Season 1, 2013–14: Berg; Season 2, 2014: Kika Kardoso
Romania	X Factor România; The X Factor Romania	Antena 1 Website	Current; Mihai Morar (11–); Former; Mihai Bendeac (8); Vlad Drăgulin (8); Răzvan Simion (1–7, 9–10); Dani Oțil (1–7, 9–10)	Current; Marius Moga (11–); Puya (11–); Delia Matache (2–); Ștefan Bănică Jr. (4–); Former; Adrian Sînă (1); Paula Seling (1); Mihai Morar (1); Dan Bittman (2–3); Cheloo (2–3); Horia Brenciu (4–8); Carla's Dreams (6–8); Loredana Groza (9–10); Florin Ristei (9–10)	Season 1, 2011–12: Andrei Leonte; Season 2, 2012: Tudor Turcu; Season 3, 2013: Florin Ristei; Season 4, 2014: Adina Răducan; Season 5, 2015: Florin Răduţă; Season 6, 2016: Olga Verbiţchi; Season 7, 2017: Jeremy Ragsdale; Season 8, 2018: Bella Santiago; Season 9, 2020: Andrada Precup; Season 10, 2021: Nick Casciaro; Season 11, 2025: George Radu
Russia	Секрет успеха Secret of Success (1–2); Фактор А The A Factor (3–5); Главная сцена The Main Stage (6–7)	RTR (1–2); Website; Russia 1 (3–7)	Aleksey Chumakov (1, 4); Elena Vorobey (1); Tutta Larsen (2); Philipp Kirkorov (3–5); Volodymyr Zelenskyy (3); Grigory Leps (6); Garik Martirosyan (6); Nargiz Zakirova (7); Marina Kravets (7); Ernest Mackevičius (7)	Valeriy Meladze (1); Aleksandr Revzin (1); Katerina Von Gechmen–Valdek (1); Valeriya (2); Tigran Keosayan (2); Valery Garkalin (2); Roman Emelyanov (3–5); Boris Krasnov (3); Lolita Milyavskaya (3–5); Igor Nikolayev (4–5); Alla Pugacheva (chairperson, 3–5); Walter Afanasieff (6); Zhanna Rozhdestvenskaya (6); Yuri Antonov (6); Sergey Chigrakov (6); Valery Leontiev (7); Diana Arbenina (7); Elena Vaenga (7); Vladimir Presnyakov (7); Nikolai Noskov (7, only auditions); Judges-producer; Walter Afanasieff (6); Konstantin Meladze (6); Maxim Fadeev (6); Igor Matvienko (6); Viktor Drobysh (6)	Season 1, 2005: Vladimir Sapovsky; Season 2, 2007: Nikolay Timokhin; Season 3, 2011: Sergei Savin; Season 4, 2012: Alexey Sulima; Season 5, 2013: Mali; Season 6, 2015: Sardor Milano; Season 7, 2015–16: Arseny Borodin
Slovenia	X Faktor	POP TV	Peter Poles; Vid Valič	Damjan Damjanovič; Jadranka Juras; Aleš Uranjek	Season 1, 2012: Demetra Malalan
South Africa	The X Factor SA	SABC 1 Website	Andile Ncube	Arno Carstens; Oskido; Zonke	Season 1, 2015: FOUR
Spain	Factor X	Cuatro (1–2); Telecinco (3–)	Current; Ion Aramendi (4–); Former; Nuria Roca (1–2); Jesús Vázquez (3); Xtra Factor; Nando Escribano (3)	Current; Abraham Mateo (4–); Lali Espósito (4–); Vanesa Martín (4–); Willy Bárcenas (4–); Former; Miqui Puig (1–2); Jorge Flo (1–2); Eva Perales (1–2); Laura Pausini (3); Risto Mejide (3); Xavi Martínez (3); Fernando Montesinos (3)	Season 1, 2007: María Villalón; Season 2, 2008: Vocal Tempo; Season 3, 2018: Pol Granch; Season 4, 2024: Aye Alfonso; Season 5, TBA: Awaiting Confirmation
Sweden	X Factor	TV4	David Hellenius	Andreas Carlsson; Marie Serneholt; Orup; Ison Glasgow	Season 1, 2012: Awa Santesson-Sey
Thailand	The X Factor Thailand	Workpoint TV	Krit Sripoomseth	Nitipong Honark; Jennifer Kim; Saksit Vejsupaporn; Chalatit Tantiwut	Season 1, 2017: Slow
Turkey	X Factor: Star Işığı	Kanal D Website	Kadir Doğulu (1a); Bülent Şakrak (1b)	Ziynet Sali (1a); Emre Aydın (1a); Ömer Karacan (1a); Armağan Çağlayan (1a); Nigar Jamal (1b); Sinan Akçıl (1b); Atiye (1b); Nihat Odabaşı (1b)	Season 1, 2014: Cancelled
Ukraine	The X Factor	STB; Website	Oksana Marchenko (1–7); Andriy Bednyakov (7–9); Daria Trehubova (10)	Ihor Kondratyuk (1–6, 10); Sergey Sosedov^{†} (1–6); Seryoga (1–4); Yolka (1–2); Irina Dubtsova (3–4); Ivan Dorn (5); Nino Katamadze (5–6); Andriy Khlyvniuk (6); Andriy Danylko (7–10); Kostiantyn Meladze (7); Julia Sanina (7); Anton Savlepov (7); Anastasiya Kamenskykh (8–10); Oleh Vynnyk (8–9); Dmytro Shurov (8–9); Olya Polyakova (10)	Season 1, 2010–11: Olexiy Kuznetsov; Season 2, 2011–12: Viktor Romanchenko; Season 3, 2012–13: Aida Nikolaychuk; Season 4, 2013–14: Oleksandr Poriadynsky; Season 5, 2014: Dmytro Babak; Season 6, 2015: Kostyantyn Bocharov; Season 7, 2016: Sevak Khanagyan; Season 8, 2017: Misha Panchishyn; Season 9, 2018: ZBSband; Season 10, 2019: Elina Ivashchenko
United Kingdom (Original) (Note: Also shown in Republic of Ireland and in series 3, 4, 7 and 13 auditions were held in Dublin, and viewers in Ireland were allowed to vote. The British version of The X Factor is also shown in Malta on channel TVM.)	The X Factor	ITV	Kate Thornton (1–3); Dermot O'Leary (4–11, 13–15); Caroline Flack (12); Olly Murs (12); Digital; Roman Kemp (13); Becca Dudley (14–15); Tinea Taylor (15); The Xtra Factor; Ben Shephard (1–3); Fearne Cotton (4); Holly Willoughby (5–6); Konnie Huq (7); Caroline Flack (8–10); Olly Murs (8–9); Matt Richardson (10); Sarah-Jane Crawford (11); Rochelle Humes (12); Melvin Odoom (12); Rylan Clark-Neal (13); Matt Edmondson (13)	Simon Cowell (1–7, 11–15); Louis Walsh (1–11, 13–14); Sharon Osbourne (1–4, 10, 13–14); Dannii Minogue (4–7); Cheryl (5–7, 11–12); Gary Barlow (8–10); Tulisa (8–9); Kelly Rowland (8); Nicole Scherzinger (9–10, 13–14); Mel B (11); Rita Ora (12); Nick Grimshaw (12); Ayda Field (15); Louis Tomlinson (15); Robbie Williams (15)	Series 1, 2004: Steve Brookstein; Series 2, 2005: Shayne Ward; Series 3, 2006: Leona Lewis; Series 4, 2007: Leon Jackson; Series 5, 2008: Alexandra Burke; Series 6, 2009: Joe McElderry; Series 7, 2010: Matt Cardle; Series 8, 2011: Little Mix; Series 9, 2012: James Arthur; Series 10, 2013: Sam Bailey; Series 11, 2014: Ben Haenow; Series 12, 2015: Louisa Johnson; Series 13, 2016: Matt Terry; Series 14, 2017: Rak-Su; Series 15, 2018: Dalton Harris
United Kingdom (Original)	The X Factor: Battle of the Stars	ITV	Kate Thornton	Louis Walsh; Sharon Osbourne; Simon Cowell	Series 1, 2006: Lucy Benjamin
United Kingdom (Original)	The X Factor: Celebrity	ITV	Dermot O'Leary	Louis Walsh; Nicole Scherzinger; Simon Cowell	Series 1, 2019: Megan McKenna
United Kingdom (Original)	The X Factor: The Band	ITV	Dermot O'Leary	Leona Lewis; Nicole Scherzinger; Simon Cowell	Series 1, 2019: Real Like You
United States	The X Factor	Fox	Steve Jones (1); Khloé Kardashian (2); Mario Lopez (2–3)	Simon Cowell; L.A. Reid (1–2); Paula Abdul (1); Nicole Scherzinger (1); Britney Spears (2); Demi Lovato (2–3); Kelly Rowland (3); Paulina Rubio (3)	Season 1, 2011: Melanie Amaro; Season 2, 2012: Tate Stevens; Season 3, 2013: Alex & Sierra
United States	El Factor X The X Factor (Spanish Kids version)	MundoFox	Poncho de Anda (1)	Belinda (1); Angélica María (1); Chyno Miranda (1); Nacho (1)	Season 1, 2013: Los Tres Charritos
Uzbekistan	X-Faktor Oʻzbekiston	FTV	Current; Oyxon Abdulakimova (3–) Former; Nilufar Sotiboldiyeva (1–2 ); Aziz Gulyamov (3, until live)	Current; Shakhriyor Argonov (2–); Lola Ahmedova (4–); Asal Shodiyeva (4–); Ravshan Sobirov (4–); Former; Ibrohim Ahmedov (1–2; 3 until live); Jasmin (1, 3); Lola (1–2 ); Munisa Rizayeva (2–3 ); Ravshan Komilov (1); Shohjahon Juraev (3, from live)	Season 1, 2023: Javlon Sapoyev; Season 2, 2024: Rishad Band; Season 3, 2025: Abdurahim Abdukarimov; Season 4, 2026: Current season
Vietnam	The X Factor Vietnam; Nhân tố bí ẩn	VTV3	Nguyên Khang (1); Thu Thủy (1); Thành Trung (2); Gil Lê (2)	Hồ Quỳnh Hương (1–2); Dương Khắc Linh (1–2); Hồ Ngọc Hà (1); Đàm Vĩnh Hưng (1); Thanh Lam (2); Tùng Dương (2)	Season 1, 2014: Giang Hồng Ngọc; Season 2, 2016: Trần Minh Như
West Africa	X Factor	AIT, NTA, STV, ViaSat, WAP TV	Toolz	M.I; Reggie Rockstone; Onyeka Onwenu	Season 1, 2013: DJ Switch
