= Selviytyjät Suomi season 7 =

Selviytyjät Suomi
- Season 7
- Presented by: Juuso Mäkilähde
- No. of days: 34
- No. of castaways: 16
- Winner: Sami Helenius
- Runner-up: Tommi Manninen
- Location: Langkawi, Malaysia
- No. of episodes: 15

Release
- Original network: Nelonen
- Original release: 27 August – 4 December 2022

Season chronology
- ← Previous; Season 6 Next → Season 8

Selviytyjät Suomi (season 7) is the seventh season of the Finnish reality television series Selviytyjät Suomi. The season returns to Malaysia for the first time since 2013 where eight new celebrity contestants face off against eight former contestants returning for a second chance to win the prize of €30,000 and the title of Sole Survivor. The season premiered on 27 August 2022 on Nelonen. The finale aired on 4 December 2022 where Sami Helenius won against Tommi Manninen in a 4-3 jury vote to win €30,000 and claim the title of Sole Survivor.

== Contestants ==
Contestant	Original	First switch	Second switch	Third switch	Merged	Status
Heidi Suomi; 47, Former Sprinter	Barat					1st Voted Out; Day 3
Joalin Loukamaa; 21, Dancer; Season 5	Timur					2nd Voted Out; Day 6
Markus Pöyhönen; 43, Former Track & Field Athlete; Season 4	Timur	Timur				3rd Voted Out; Day 8
Viivi Vaattovaara; 28, Milan, Italy; Season 4	Timur	Barat				4th Voted Out; Day 10
Essi Unkuri; 23, Model	Barat	Timur				5th Voted Out; Day 12
Niko Saarinen; 35, Reality TV Personality; Season 5	Timur	Timur	Timur			6th Voted Out; Day 14
Jasmiina Yildiz; 24, Big Brother Winner	Barat	Timur	Barat	Timur		Medically Evacuated; Day 17
Jani "Wallu" Valpio; 48, Culture Presenter; Season 3	Timur	Barat	Barat	Barat		7th Voted Out; 1st Jury Member; Day 17
Pok Biil; 28, Thai Boxer	Barat	Barat	Barat	Timur	Tioman	8th Voted Out; 2nd Jury Member; Day 21
Leo Stillman; 30, Singer	Barat	Timur	Timur	Timur	Tioman	9th Voted Out; 3rd Jury Member; Day 23
Karoliina Tuominen; 27, Radio Presenter; Season 5	Timur	Timur	Timur	Timur	Tioman	10th Voted Out; 4th Jury Member; Day 25
Helmeri Pirinen; 34, Reality TV Star; Season 6	Timur	Barat	Barat	Timur	Tioman	11th Voted Out; 5th Jury Member; Day 29
Virpi Kätkä; 52, Singer; Season 3	Timur	Barat	Barat	Barat	Tioman	Left Competition; Day 32
Julia Korpinen; 20, Actress	Barat	Barat	Timur	Barat	Tioman	Lost Challenge; 6th Jury Member; Day 33
Tommi Manninen; 31, Radio Presenter	Barat	Barat	Barat	Barat	Tioman	Runner-up; Day 34
Sami Helenius; 48, Former Ice Hockey Player	Barat	Timur	Timur	Barat	Tioman	Sole Survivor; Day 34

=== Future Appearances ===
Both finalists would later return to Survivor, winner Sami Helenius would return on season 9, while runner up Tommi Manninen represented Finland on Australian Survivor: Australia V The World in 2025.

== Season summary ==
Challenge winners and eliminations by episode
Episode	Air date	Challenges		Eliminated	Vote	Finish
Episode	Air date	Reward	Immunity	Eliminated	Vote	Finish
Episode 1	28 August 2022	Timur	Timur	Heidi	6-2	1st Voted Out; Day 3
Episode 2	4 September 2022	Barat	Barat	Joalin	3-2-0	2nd Voted Out; Day 6
Episode 3	11 September 2022	Timur	Barat	Markus	3-2-2	3rd Voted Out; Day 8
Episode 4	18 September 2022	Barat	Timur	Viivi	5-2	4th Voted Out; Day 10
Episode 5	25 September 2022	Barat	Barat	Essi	5-1	5th Voted Out; Day 12
Episode 6	2 October 2022	Barat	Barat	Niko	3-2	6th Voted Out; Day 14
Episode 7	9 October 2022	Timur	Timur	Jasmiina	—N/a	Medically Evacuated; Day 17
Episode 7	9 October 2022	Timur	Timur	Wallu	2-1-1	7th Voted Out; 1st Jury Member; Day 17
Episode 8	16 October 2022	Helmeri, Tommi [Karoliina, Sami]				
Episode 9	23 October 2022	Helmeri	Helmeri	Pok	4-2-2-1-1	8th Voted Out; 2nd Jury Member; Day 21
Episode 10	30 October 2022	Tommi [Karoliina]	Karoliina	Leo	4-2-1	9th Voted Out; 3rd Jury Member; Day 23
Episode 11	6 November 2022	Karoliina [Julia]	Helmeri	Karoliina	3-2-1	10th Voted Out; 4th Jury Member; Day 25
Episode 12	13 November 2022	Tommi [Virpi]	—N/a			
Episode 12	13 November 2022	Tommi	—N/a			
Episode 12	13 November 2022	Sami	—N/a			
Episode 13	20 November 2022	Helmeri [Sami, Tommi]	Julia	Helmeri	3-2	11th Voted Out; 5th Jury Member; Day 29
Episode 14	27 November 2022	Julia [Virpi]	Tommi	Virpi	—N/a	Quit; Day 32
Episode 15	4 December 2022	Sami	Sami	Julia	—N/a	Eliminated; 6th Jury Member; Day 33
Episode 15	4 December 2022	Sami	Tommi	Julia	—N/a	Eliminated; 6th Jury Member; Day 33
Episode 15	4 December 2022	Jury Vote		Tommi	3/7 votes	Runner-up; Day34
Episode 15	4 December 2022	Jury Vote		Sami	4/7 votes	Sole Survivor; Day34

== Voting history ==
	Original tribes		First switch			Second switch	Third switch		Merged tribe											
Episode	1	2	3	4	5	6	7		8	9		10	11	13	14		15	Jury Vote		
Day	3	6	8	10	12	14	17		19	21		23	25	29	32		33	34		
Eliminated	Heidi	Joalin	Markus	Viivi	Essi	Niko	Jasmiina	Wallu	Leo & Virpi (Note: There was no elimination. Instead, the winners of the challenge got to give black votes—i.e., extra votes for the next Tribal Council.)	Pok		Leo	Karoliina	Helmeri	Tie	Virpi	Julia	Tommi	Sami	
Votes	6-2	3-2-0 (Note: Karoliina played a immunity amulet, therefore two votes against her were not counted.)	3-2-2	5-2	5-1	3-2	Evacuated	2-1-1	2-2	4-2-2-1-1		4-2-1	3-2-1	3-2	~~2-2~~	Quit	Challenge	4-3		
Voter	Vote																			
Sami	Essi		Jasmiina		Essi	Niko		Virpi	Leo	Pok		Leo	Julia	Helmeri	~~Julia~~		Won			
Tommi	Heidi			Viivi				Wallu	Leo	Pok		Leo	Karoliina	Virpi	~~Julia~~		Won			
Julia	Heidi			Viivi		Niko		Wallu	None	Karoliina		Leo	Tommi	Helmeri	~~Sami~~		Lost		Sami	Sami
Virpi		None (Note: Virpi played the dice of fate to determine whether she doubled or lost her vote. She rolled and lost her right to vote.)		Viivi				Tommi	None	Pok		Leo	Karoliina	Helmeri	~~Sami~~					
Helmeri		Niko		Viivi					Virpi	Leo		Julia	Karoliina	Virpi				Tommi		
Karoliina		Joalin	Markus		Essi	Sami			Virpi	Pok		Leo	Julia						Sami	
Leo	Heidi		Markus		Essi	Niko			None	Sami		Tommi							Sami	
Pok	Heidi			Viivi					None	Karoliina								Tommi		
Wallu		~~Karoliina~~		Pok				None (Note: Wallu played the dice of fate to determine whether he doubled or lost his vote. He rolled and lost his right to vote.)										Tommi		
Jasmiina	Heidi		Sami		Essi															
Niko		Joalin	Markus		Essi	Sami														
Essi	Heidi		Sami		Jasmiina															
Viivi		Joalin		Pok																
Markus		~~Karoliina~~	Jasmiina																	
Joalin		Niko																		
Heidi	Essi																			
Black Votes										Leo	Virpi									
