= Selviytyjät Suomi season 9 =

Selviytyjät Suomi
- Season 9
- Presented by: Riku Rantala
- No. of days: 37
- No. of castaways: 18
- Location: Johor, Malaysia

Release
- Original network: Nelonen
- Original release: 1 September – 15 December 2024

Season chronology
- ← Previous; Season 8

Selviytyjät Suomi (season 9) is the ninth season of the Finnish reality television series Selviytyjät Suomi. The season returns to Langkawi, Malaysia where 18 Finnish celebrities compete in tribes against each other for 37 days to win the grand prize of €30,000 and claim the title of Sole Survivor. Riku Rantala returns to host. The season is slated to premiere on 1 September 2024 on Nelonen.

In May 2024, it was reported that one of the contestants, author Henriikka Rönkkönen was medically evacuated from the island due to serious injury from a heatstroke.

The season sees some new twists to the format. At the beginning of the competition, two team leaders: Kristian Heiskari and Sami Helenius, former winning contestants, are introduced. The "tribe leaders" have important roles on the competition, as they can choose rewards and advantages for their tribes.

== Contestants ==
List of Selviytyjät Suomi (season 9) contestants
Contestant	Original tribe	First Switched Tribe	Second Switched Tribe	Merged tribe	Finish
Emmi Suuronen; 28, Diili Contestant	Jerung				1st Voted Out; Day 3
Eino Heiskanen; 37, Actor	Jerung				2nd Voted Out; Day 6
Henriikka Rönkkönen; 40, Author	Jerung	Buaya			Medically Evacuated; Day 7
Bakari Diarra; 25, Fashion Designer & Rapper	Buaya	Jerung			Lost Duel; Day 9
Kristian Heiskari; 31, Reality TV Personality; Season 5	Jerung	Jerung			3rd Voted Out; Day 12
Max Blomfelt; 27, Influencer	Jerung	Jerung			4th Voted Out; Day 14
Toni Kohonen; 48, Former Baseball Player	Jerung	Buaya	Jerung		Lost Duel; Day 16
Marios "HesaÄijä" Kleovoulou; 38, Rapper	Buaya	Buaya	Buaya		5th Voted Out; Day 19
Jontte Valosaari; 43, Singer	Buaya	Jerung	Jerung	Tuan	6th Voted Out; 1st Jury Member; Day 23
Viivi Altonen; 27, Model	Buaya	Jerung	Buaya	Tuan	7th Voted Out; 2nd Jury Member; Day 25
Mikael Renwall; 27, Influencer	Buaya	Buaya	Buaya	Tuan	8th Voted Out; 3rd Jury Member; Day 27
Reetta Ylä-Rautio; 21, Actress	Jerung	Buaya	Jerung	Tuan	9th Voted Out; 4th Jury Member; Day 29
Rita Niemi-Manninen; 44, Wellness Coach	Jerung	Jerung	Buaya	Tuan	10th Voted Out; 5th Jury Member; Day 31
Sami Helenius; 50, Former Ice Hockey Player; Season 7	Buaya	Buaya	Buaya	Tuan	11th Voted Out; 6th Jury Member; Day 33
Jenni Janakka; 38, Author	Buaya	Jerung	Jerung	Tuan	12th Voted Out; 7th Jury Member; Day 35
Mika Parikka; 28, Radio Host	Jerung	Jerung	Jerung	Tuan	Eliminated; 8th Jury Member; Day 36
Sita Salminen; 35, Influencer & Petolliset Winner	Buaya	Buaya	Jerung	Tuan	Runner Up; Day 37
Mia "Millu" Haataja; 28, Radio Host	Buaya	Buaya	Buaya	Tuan	Sole Survivor; Day 37

== Season summary ==
Challenge winners and eliminations by episodes
Episode			Challenge winner(s)		Eliminated		
No.	Title	Air date	Reward	Immunity	Eliminated	Vote	Finish
1	"Heimopäälliköiden aikakausi" The Age of Tribal Chiefs	1 September 2024	Buaya	Buaya	Emmi	5-4	1st Voted Out; Day 3
2	"Kirvelevä tappio" A Stinging Loss	8 September 2024	Jerung	Buaya	Eino	5-3	2nd Voted Out; Day 6
3	"Kalifiksi kalifin paikalle" A Caliph For a Caliph	15 September 2024	Buaya	Buaya	Henriikka	0	Medically Evacuated; Day 9
3	"Kalifiksi kalifin paikalle" A Caliph For a Caliph	15 September 2024	Buaya	Buaya	Bakari	0	Lost Duel; Day 9
4	"Salaiset koodit" Secret Codes	22 September 2024	Buaya	Buaya	Kristian	5-2	3rd Voted Out; Day 12
5	"Hyytyvät hymyt" Congealing Smiles	29 September 2024	Buaya	Buaya	Max	3-1-1	4th Voted Out; Day 14
6	"Isoja siirtoja" Big Moves	6 October 2024	Buaya	Buaya	Toni	No vote	Eliminated; Day 16
7	"Pinnan alla" Under the Surface	13 October 2024	Jerung	Jerung	Marios	4-2	5th Voted Out; Day 19
8	"Paikka auringossa" A Place in the Sun	20 October 2024	Jontte, Reetta, Sami, Sita & Viivi		Mika	8–1–1	Mika was not left out of the game, but instead received two black votes for the next tribal council.
9	"Bluffimestari"; Bluff Master	27 October 2024	Jontte	Mikael	Jontte	9-2-1	6th Voted Out; 1st Jury Member; Day 23
10	"Itkuinen heimoneuvosto" Weeping Tribal Council	3 November 2024	Rita, [Jenni, Mia]	Mikael	Viivi	8-1	7th Voted Out; 2nd Jury Member; Day 25
11	"Myrskyvaroitus"; Storm Warning	10 November 2024	Mikael, Sami, Sita	Rita	Mikael	4-3-1	8th Voted Out; 3rd Jury Member; Day 27
12	"Myrskyvaroitus"; Storm Warning	10 November 2024	Sami, [Mia, Mika]	Mia	Reetta	2-0	9th Voted Out; 4th Jury Member; Day 29
13	"Myrskyvaroitus"; Storm Warning	10 November 2024	Rita [Jenni]	Jenni	Rita	4-2	10th Voted Out; 5th Jury Member; Day 31
14	"Myrskyvaroitus"; Storm Warning	10 November 2024	Sita [Mika]	Sita	Sami	3-2	11th Voted Out; 6th Jury Member; Day 33
15	"Myrskyvaroitus"; Storm Warning	10 November 2024	Sita [Mia]	Mia	Jenni	3-1	12th Voted Out; 7th Jury Member; Day 35

== Voting history ==
#	Original Tribe		First Switched Tribes				Second Switched Tribes		Merge Tribes							
Episode	1	2	3		4	5	6	7	8	9	10	11	12	13	14	15
Day	3	6	7	9	12	14	16	19	21	23	25	27	29	31	33	35
Voted out	Emmi	Eino	Henriikka	Bakari	Kristian	Max	Toni	Marios	Mika	Jontte	Viivi	Mikael	Reetta	Rita	Sami	Jenni
Votes	5-4	5-3	No vote	No vote	5-2	3-1-1	No vote	4-2	8-1-1	9-2-1	8-1	4-3-1	2-0	4-2	3-2	3-1
Mia								Marios	Mika	Jontte	Viivi	Mika	~~Rita~~	Rita	Sami	Jenni
Mika	Emmi	Eino			Kristian	Jenni			Mikael	Jontte	Viivi	Mikael	~~Rita~~	Rita	Jenni	Jenni
Sita									Mika	Jontte	Viivi	Mika	~~Rita~~	Rita	Sami	Jenni
Jenni					Kristian	No vote			Mika	Jontte	Viivi	Mikael	Reetta	Sita	Sami	Mika
Sami								Marios	Mika	Jontte	Viivi	Mikael	~~Rita~~	Rita	Jenni	
Rita	Mika	Henriikka			Kristian	Max		Marios	Mika	Jontte	Viivi	Mikael	Reetta	Sita		
Reetta	Emmi	Eino							Mika	Jontte	Viivi	Mika	~~Rita~~			
Mikael								Rita	Rita	Jontte	Viivi	Jenni				
Viivi					Kristian	Max		Marios	Mika	Jontte	Mika					
Jontte					Kristian	Max	Won Duel		Mika	Reetta						
Marios								Rita								
Toni	Mika	Henriikka					Lost Duel									
Max	Emmi	Eino			Jenni	Rita										
Kristian	Emmi	Eino		Won Duel	Jenni											
Bakari				Lost Duel												
Henriikka	Emmi	Eino														
Eino	Mika	Henriikka														
Emmi	Mika															
Black Votes										Mika; Mika						
