= Selviytyjät Suomi =

- Created by: Charlie Parsons
- Country of origin: Finland
- Original language: Finnish
- No. of seasons: 11

Original release
- Network: MTV3 (2013); Nelonen (2018–present)
- Release: 21 February 2013 – present

Related
- Suomen Robinson (2004–2005); Survivor

Selviytyjät Suomi is a Finnish reality show based on Survivor. It premiered on MTV3 on 21 February 2013.

The first season was filmed from May to July 2012 in Malaysia. 16 contestants participated in the competition, with Jarkko Kortesoja becoming the first winner. The winner of the show received 50,000 euros on the first season and 30,000 euros in the later seasons. The first season is hosted by Heikki Paasonen, with seasons two to seven being hosted by Juuso Mäkilähde. Riku Rantala has been the host from the eighth season onwards.

After the first season ended, MTV3 did not renew the series for a second season. In 2017, Nelonen got the rights to the series and decided to make a Celebrity season, airing the following year. This is the first season of Survivor to air on Nelonen since 2005 when the last season of Suomen Robinson aired on the network. Currently there has been aired six seasons aired by channel Nelonen, and the eighth is under production.

The version uses slightly similar rules compared for the original version, but there's less contestants and no live final. However, the seasons aired on Nelonen, include a show called Selviytyjät Extra, where in each episode, the cast do collect the challenges, results and elimination of the previous episode.

== Season overview ==
Season	Location	Host	Channel	Participants	Winner	Grand Prize	First aired	Last aired
1	Borneo, Malaysia	Heikki Paasonen	MTV3	16	Jarkko Kortesoja	€50,000	21 February 2013	28 April 2013
2	Caramoan, Philippines	Juuso Mäkilähde	Nelonen	16 VIP	Sampo Kaulanen	€30,000	3 February 2018	13 May 2018
3	Caramoan, Philippines	Juuso Mäkilähde	Nelonen	16 VIP	Miska Haakana	€30,000	3 February 2019	12 May 2019
4	Caramoan, Philippines	Juuso Mäkilähde	Nelonen	16 (8 VIP)	Kai Fagerlund	€30,000	8 September 2019	15 December 2019
5	Haparanda, Sweden	Juuso Mäkilähde	Nelonen	16 VIP	Kristian Heiskari	€30,000	27 February 2021	5 June 2021
6	Dominican Republic	Juuso Mäkilähde	Nelonen	16 VIP	Shirly Karvinen	€30,000	29 August 2021	5 December 2021
7	Langkawi, Malaysia	Juuso Mäkilähde	Nelonen	16 VIP (8 Returnees)	Sami Helenius	€30,000	27 August 2022	4 December 2022
8	Langkawi, Malaysia	Riku Rantala	Nelonen	18 VIP	Teemu Roivainen	€30,000	27 August 2023	10 December 2023
9	Johor, Malaysia	Riku Rantala	Nelonen	18 VIP (2 Returnees)	Mia "Millu" Haataja	€30,000	1 September 2024	15 December 2024
10	Johor, Malaysia	Riku Rantala	Nelonen	16 (13 VIP)	Saana Akiola	€30,000	31 August 2025	14 December 2025
11	Johor, Malaysia	Riku Rantala	Nelonen	16 VIP (16 Returnees)	TBD	€30,000	30 August 2026	December 2026
