= Selviytyjät Suomi 2018 =

- Season 2018
- Presented by: Juuso Mäkilähde
- No. of days: 34
- No. of castaways: 16
- Winner: Sampo Kaulanen
- Runner-up: Janni Hussi
- Location: Caramoan, Philippines

Release
- Original release: 3 February – 13 May 2018

Season chronology
- ← Previous; Selviytyjät Suomi 2013 Next → Selviytyjät Suomi 2019

Selviytyjät Suomi 2018 is the second season of the Finnish version of Survivor which is based on the Swedish reality television show Expedition Robinson. This is the first season to air since 2013 and the first to air on the television channel Nelonen after they had hosted the previous version of Suomen Robinson back in 2005. This season consists of 16 contestants who are famous for various reasons who are put into two tribes of eight, trying to last out everyone else to win €30,000. The season aired from 3 February to 13 May 2018 where businessman and reality personal Sampo Kaulanen won in a 6–1 jury vote over fitness competitor Janni Hussi.

== Finishing order ==
Contestant	Original Tribe	Swapped Tribe	Merged Tribe	Finish
Ville Lång; 33, Former Badminton Player	Tugawe			1st Voted Out; Day 3
Maria "Jekku" Berglund; 29, Radio Host	Tugawe			2nd Voted Out; Day 6
Noora Karma; 42, Magician	Sabitan			3rd Voted Out; Day 8
Mari "Mariko" Pajalahti; 38, Singer	Sabitan			4th Voted Out; Day 11
Cristal Snow; 41, Singer	Tugawe	Tugawe		5th Voted Out; Day 14
Kalle Palander; 40, Former Alpine Skier	Sabitan	Sabitan		6th Voted Out; Day 17
Kai Vaine; 39, Actor	Sabitan	Tugawe		7th Voted Out; Day 18
Sara Chafak; 26, Miss Finland	Sabitan	Sabitan	Gota	8th Voted Out; 1st Jury Member; Day 20
James Musta Barbaari; 26, Rapper	Tugawe	Sabitan	Gota	9th Voted Out; 2nd Jury Member; Day 23
Helena Ahti-Hallberg; 49, Dancer	Tugawe	Tugawe	Gota	10th Voted Out; 3rd Jury Member; Day 25
Juhana Helmenkalastaja; 43, Clothing Stylist	Sabitan	Sabitan	Gota	11th Voted Out; 4th Jury Member; Day 27
Katja Ståhl; 48, Television Presenter	Sabitan	Tugawe	Gota	12th Voted Out; 5th Jury Member; Day 29
Ilari Sahamies; 34, Poker Player	Sabitan	Sabitan	Gota	13th Voted Out; 6th Jury Member; Day 32
Kimmo Vehviläinen; 45, Radio Host	Tugawe	Sabitan	Gota	14th Voted Out; 7th Jury Member; Day 33
Janni Hussi; 26, Fitness Competitor	Tugawe	Tugawe	Gota	Runner Up; Day 34
Sampo Kaulanen; 39, Businessman	Tugawe	Tugawe	Gota	Sole Survivor; Day 34

== Challenges ==
Challenge winners and eliminations by episode
Air Date	Challenge winner(s)		Eliminated	Vote	Finish
Air Date	Reward	Immunity	Eliminated	Vote	Finish
3 February 2018	Sabitan	Sabitan	Ville	6–2	1st voted out Day 3
10 February 2018	Tugawe	Sabitan	Jekku	4–3	2nd voted out Day 6
17 February 2018	Sabitan	Tugawe	Noora	6–2	3rd voted out Day 8
24 February 2018	Sabitan	Tugawe	Mariko	4–2–1	4th voted out Day 11
3 March 2018	Sabitan	Sabitan	Cristal	5–1	5th voted out Day 14
10 March 2018	Tugawe	Tugawe	Kalle	3–2–1	6th voted out Day 17
17 March 2018		Janni, Sampo, Katja, Sara & Juhani	Kai	5–0	7th voted out Day 18
24 March 2018	Janni	James	Sara	6–4	8th voted out 1st Jury Member; Day 20
31 March 2018	James (Helena)	Janni	James	5–3	9th voted out 2nd Jury Member; Day 22
7 April 2018	Juhana (Helena)	Juhana	Helena	6–1	10th voted out 3nd Jury Member; Day 25
14 April 2018	Survivor auction	Sampo	Juhana	4–1–1	11th voted out 4th Jury Member; Day 27
27 April 2018	Janni (Katja)	Ilari	Katja	3–2	12th voted out 5th Jury Member; Day 29
6 May 2018	Janni	Sampo	Ilari	3–1	13th voted out 6th Jury Member; Day 32
13 May 2018	Janni		Kimmo	1–0	14th voted out 7th Jury Member; Day 33
13 May 2018	Jury vote				
13 May 2018	Jury vote		Janni	1/7 votes	Runner Up; Day 34
13 May 2018	Jury vote		Sampo	6/7 votes	Sole Survivor; Day 34

== Voting history ==
	Original tribes				Switched tribes		Twist Pre-Merge	Merged tribe									
Episode #	1	2	3	4	5	6	7	8		9	10	11	12	13	14	Jury Vote	
Day #	3	6	8	11	14	17	18	20		22	25	27	29	32	33	34	
Eliminated	Ville	Jekku	Noora	Mariko	Cristal	Kalle	Kai	Sara		James	Helena	Juhana	Katja	Ilari	Kimmo	Janni	Sampo
Votes	6–2	4–3	6–2	4–2–1	5–1	3–2–1	5–0	6–4		5–3	6–1	4–1–1	3–2	3–1	1–0	6–1	
Voter	Vote																
Sampo	Ville	Jekku			Cristal		Kai	Sara		James	Helena	Juhana	Katja	Ilari	None		
Janni	Ville	Jekku			Cristal		Kai	Sara	Sara	James	Helena	Juhana	Katja	Ilari	Kimmo		
Kimmo	Ville	Jekku				Kalle	Nominated	Sara		James	Helena	Juhana	Katja	Ilari	None		Sampo
Ilari			Noora	Mariko		Kimmo	Nominated	Katja		Katja	Helena	Kimmo	Sampo	Kimmo			Sampo
Katja			Juhana	Juhana	Cristal		Kai	Sara		James	Helena	Juhana	Sampo			Janni	
Juhana			Noora	Mariko		Kalle	Kai	Katja		Katja	Helena	Janni					Sampo
Helena	Ville	Jekku			Cristal		Nominated	Sara		James	Ilari						Sampo
James	Ville	Helena				Kalle	Nominated	Katja		Katja							Sampo
Sara			Noora	Mariko		Kimmo	Kai	Katja									Sampo
Kai			Noora	Mariko	Cristal		Nominated										
Kalle			Noora	Katja		James											
Cristal	Ville	Helena			Helena												
Mariko			Noora	Katja													
Noora			Juhana														
Jekku	Cristal	Helena															
Ville	Cristal																
