= Selviytyjät Suomi season 3 =

Selviytyjät Suomi
- Season 3
- Presented by: Juuso Mäkilähde
- No. of days: 32
- No. of castaways: 16
- Winner: Miska Haakana
- Runner-up: Kim Herold
- Location: Caramoan, Philippines

Release
- Original release: 3 February – 12 May 2019

Season chronology
- ← Previous; Season 2 Next → Season 4

Selviytyjät Suomi 2019 is the third season of the Finnish version of Survivor which is based on the Swedish reality television show Expedition Robinson. This is the second season to air since 2013 and the second to air on the television channel Nelonen after they had hosted the previous version of Suomen Robinson back in 2005. This season also consists of 16 contestants who are famous for various reasons who are put into two tribes of eight, trying to last out everyone else to win €30,000. The season aired from 3 February to 12 May 2019 where Miska Haakana won in a 6-1 jury vote over Kim Herold.

== Finishing order ==
Contestant	Original Tribe	Switched Tribe	2nd Switched Tribe	Merged Tribe	Finish
Eevi Teittinen; 28, Fitness Athlete	Agila				1st Voted Out; Day 3
Niklas Hagman; 38, Former Ice Hockey Player	Agila				2nd Voted Out; Day 5
Sauli Koskinen; 33, Reality TV Personality	Buwaya	Buwaya			3rd Voted Out; Day 7
Noora Räty; 28, Ice Hockey Goalkeeper	Buwaya	Buwaya	Buwaya		4th Voted Out; Day 9
Olli Herman; 34, Rock Artist	Agila	Agila	Agila		5th Voted Out; Day 11
Hannes Hyvönen; 42, Former Ice Hockey Player	Buwaya	Buwaya	Buwaya		6th Voted Out; Day 13
Vilma Bergenheim; 36, Model	Agila	Buwaya	Buwaya	Nimbuyan	7th Voted Out; 1st Jury Member; Day 15
Lotta Näkyvä; 29, Model	Buwaya	Buwaya	Agila	Nimbuyan	8th Voted Out; 2nd Jury Member; Day 18
Veronica Verho; 21, Radio Host	Buwaya	Buwaya	Agila	Nimbuyan	9th Voted Out; 3rd Jury Member; Day 21
Marko Asell; 47, Wrestler	Agila	Agila	Agila	Nimbuyan	10th Voted Out; 4th Jury Member; Day 23
Lola Odusoga; 40, TV Presenter	Agila	Agila	Agila	Nimbuyan	11th Voted Out; 5th Jury Member; Day 25
Tuuli Matinsalo; 48, Aerobics Athlete	Buwaya	Buwaya	Agila	Nimbuyan	12th Voted Out; 6th Jury Member; Day 27
Virpi Kätkä; 48, Singer	Agila	Agila	Buwaya	Nimbuyan	13th Voted Out; 7th Jury Member; Day 29
Wallu Valpio; 44, Culture Presenter	Buwaya	Buwaya	Buwaya	Nimbuyan	14th Voted Out; 8th Jury Member; Day 31
Kim Herold; 38, Musician	Buwaya	Agila	Agila	Nimbuyan	Runner-up; Day 32
Miska Haakana; 22, YouTuber	Agila	Agila	Buwaya	Nimbuyan	Sole Survivor; Day 32

== Challenges ==
Challenge winners and eliminations by episode
Episode	Challenge winner(s)		Eliminated	Vote	Finish
Episode	Reward	Immunity	Eliminated	Vote	Finish
1	Buwaya	Buwaya	Eevi	6-1-1	1st voted out Day 3
2	Buwaya	Buwaya	Niklas	4-3	2nd voted out Day 5
3	Buwaya	Agila	Sauli	5-3	3rd voted out Day 7
4	Buwaya	Agila	Noora	4-2	4th voted out Day 9
5	Agila	Buwaya	Olli	5-1-1	5th voted out Day 11
6	Buwaya	Agila	Hannes	4-1	6th voted out Day 13
7		Tuuli, Marko, Lola, Kim & Veronica	Vilma	5-0	7th voted out 1st Jury Member; Day 15
8	Wallu	Kim	Lotta	6-4	8th voted out 2nd Jury Member; Day 18
9	Tuuli (Virpi)	Lola	Veronica	7-1	9th voted out 3rd Jury Member; Day 21
10	Virpi	Wallu	Marko	4-2-1	10th voted out 4th Jury Member; Day 23
11	Tuuli, Wallu & Miska	Tuuli	Lola	4-1-1	11th voted out 5th Jury Member; Day 25
12		Wallu	Tuuli	4-1	12th voted out 6th Jury Member; Day 27
13		Kim	Virpi	3-1	13th voted out 7th Jury Member; Day 29
14		Kim y Miska	Wallu	Lost Duel	14th voted out 8th Jury Member; Day 31
14	Jury vote				
14	Jury vote		Kim	1/7 votes	Runner-up; Day 32
14	Jury vote		Miska Haakana	6/7 votes	Sole Survivor; Day 32

== Voting history ==
	Original tribes		Switched tribes	2nd Switched tribes			Twist Pre-Merge	Merged tribe									
Episode #	1	2	3	4	5	6	7	8		9	10	11	12	13	14	Jury Vote	
Day #	3	5	7	9	11	13	15	18		21	23	25	27	32	33	34	
Eliminated	Eevi	Niklas	Sauli	Noora	Olli	Hannes	Vilma	Lotta		Veronica	Marko	Lola	Tuuli	Virpi	Wallu	Kim	Miska
Votes	6–1–1	4–3	5–3	4–2	5–1–1	4–1	5–0	6–4		7–1	4–2–1	4–0	4–1	3–1	None	6–1	
Voter	Vote																
Miska	Eevi	Niklas		Noora		Hannes	Nominated	Lotta		Veronica	Marko	Lola	Tuuli	Virpi	Win		
Kim					Olli		Vilma	Lotta		Veronica	Marko	Lola	Tuuli	Virpi	Win		
Wallu			Noora	Noora		Hannes	Nominated	Lotta	Lotta	Veronica	Marko	Lola	Tuuli	Virpi	Lost	Kim	
Virpi	Eevi	Lola		Noora		Hannes	Nominated	Lotta		Veronica	Marko	Lola	Tuuli	Wallu			~~Miska~~ (Note: Kim wins the last immunity and he decided to eliminated vote's Virpi in the final TC)
Tuuli			Sauli		Olli		Vilma	Miska		Veronica	Virpi	~~Kim~~	Kim				Miska
Lola	Eevi	Niklas			Olli		Vilma	Miska		Veronica	Virpi	~~Kim~~					Miska
Marko	Eevi	Niklas			Lotta		Vilma	Lotta		Veronica	Kim						Miska
Veronica			Sauli		Olli		Vilma	Miska		Kim							Miska
Lotta			Sauli		Olli		Nominated	Miska									Miska
Vilma	Eevi	Lola	Noora	Noora		Hannes	Nominated										Miska
Hannes			Sauli	Vilma		Vilma											
Oli	Lola	Niklas			Lola												
Noora			Sauli	Vilma													
Sauli			Noora														
Niklas	Eevi	Lola															
Eevi	Miska																
