= Selviytyjät Suomi season 8 =

Selviytyjät Suomi
- Season 8
- Presented by: Riku Rantala
- No. of days: 37
- No. of castaways: 18
- Winner: Teemu Roivainen
- Runner-up: Tytti Junna
- Location: Langkawi, Malaysia

Release
- Original network: Nelonen
- Original release: 27 August – 10 December 2023

Season chronology
- ← Previous; Season 7 Next → Season 9

Selviytyjät Suomi (season 8) is the eighth season of the Finnish reality television series Selviytyjät Suomi. This season is filmed once again in Malaysia where for the first time, 18 celebrities are split into tribes and compete in challenges to survive and compete against each other to win €30,000 and claim the title of Sole Survivor. The season is the longest of the Finnish version so far, with celebrities completing for record 37 days. The main twist this season is for the first time, the tribes are divided by gender. Women on Sotong, men on Ular. This season is hosted for the first time by Riku Rantala after the previous host, Juuso Mäkilähde, left to focus on his radio program. The season premiered on 27 August 2023 on Nelonen. The season ended on 10 December 2023 where singer Teemu Roivainen won in a close 5-4 jury vote against radio presenter Tytti Junna to win the grand prize and the title of Sole Survivor.

== Finishing order ==
List of Selviytyjät Suomi (season 8) contestants
Contestant	Tribe				Finish
Contestant	Original	First switch	Second switch	Merged	Finish
Niina Kuhta; 44, Businesswoman	Sotong				Quit (Mental issues); Day 3
Rosanna Kulju; 31, Model	Sotong				1st voted out Day 6
Roope Rannisto; 24, Influencer	Ular	Sotong			2nd voted out Day 8
Lloyd Libiso; 29, Journalist	Ular	Sotong			3rd voted out Day 10
Ismo Apell; 55, Actor	Ular	Ular	Ular		4th voted out Day 13
Clarissa Hedman; 33, Diili Winner	Sotong	Sotong	Sotong		5th voted out Day 16
Constantinos "Gogi" Mavromichalis; 36, Actor	Ular	Ular	Sotong		6th voted out Day 19
Kira "Kipa" Tiivola; 39, Fitness Trainer	Sotong	Sotong	Sotong		7th Voted Out; Day 21
Teemu Laurell; 38, Top Chef Suomi Winner	Ular	Ular	Sotong	Barakuda	8th Voted Out; 1st Jury Member; Day 23
Alina Voronkova; 28, Model	Sotong	Ular	Sotong	Barakuda	9th Voted Out; 2nd Jury Member; Day 25
Riitta-Liisa Roponen; 44, Cross-Country Skier	Sotong	Sotong	Ular	Barakuda	10th Voted Out; 3rd Jury Member; Day 27
Luyeye "Viki" Konssi; 31, YouTuber & Rapper	Ular	Sotong	Sotong	Barakuda	11th Voted Out; 4th Jury Member; Day 29
Sergey Hilman; 28, Influencer	Ular	Sotong	Ular	Barakuda	12th Voted Out; 5th Jury Member; Day 31
Pinja Aurora Sanaksenaho; 20, YouTuber	Sotong	Ular	Ular	Barakuda	13th Voted Out; 6th Jury Member; Day 33
Rami Hietaniemi; 40, Former Wrestler	Ular	Ular	Sotong	Barakuda	Eliminated; 7th Jury Member; Day 35
Sonja Aiello; 23, Fitness Influencer	Sotong	Ular	Ular	Barakuda	Eliminated; 8th Jury Member; Day 37
Tytti Junna; 31, Radio Presenter	Sotong	Sotong	Ular	Barakuda	Runner-up; Day 37
Teemu Roivainen; 36, Singer	Ular	Ular	Ular	Barakuda	Sole Survivor; Day 37

== Season summary ==
Challenge winners and eliminations by episodes
Episode			Challenge winner(s)		Eliminated	
No.	Title	Air date	Reward	Immunity	Tribe	Player
1	"Naiset vs. miehet" Women vs men	27 August 2023	Ular	Ular	Sotong	Niina
2	"Riskipeliä"; Risky game	3 September 2023	Sotong	Ular	Sotong	Rosanna
3	"Salaisuuksia viidakossa" Secrets in the Jungle	10 September 2023	Ular	Ular	Sotong	Roope
4	"Aarrejahti"; Treasure hunt	17 September 2023	Ular	Ular	Sotong	Lloyd
5	"Pahin tappio" The worst defeat	24 September 2023	Ular	Sotong	Ular	Ismo
6	"Shakkia ihmisillä" Chess with humans	1 October 2023	Sotong	Ular	Sotong	Clarissa
7	"Isoja kaloja" Big fish	8 October 2023	Sotong	Ular	Sotong	Gogi
8	"Kohti uutta" Towards new	15 October 2023	Alina, Pinja, Sonja, Teemu L., Teemu R. (Note: The challenge was a right to merge challenge. The winners were guaranteed a spot on the merged tribe.)		N/A	Kipa
9	"Vaarallisia tuttavuuksia" Dangerous acquaintances	22 October 2023	Alina {Tytti}	Alina	Barakuda	Teemu L.
10	"Harhautus"; A feint	29 October 2023	Alina {Sergey}	Rami	Barakuda	Alina
11	"Kohtalokas irtiotto" A fateful release	5 November 2023	Teemu R. {Rami, Sonja}	Sergey	Barakuda	Riitta-Liisa
12	"Veitsenterällä"; At the blade	12 November 2023	Pinja, Rami, Teemu R., Viki	Pinja	Barakuda	Viki
13	"Uudet siirrot" New moves	19 November 2023	Survivor Auction	Pinja	Barakuda	Sergey
14	"Kovia lupauksia" Big promises	26 November 2023	Teemu R. [Tytti]	Teemu R.	Barakuda	Pinja
15	"Kaksin viidakossa" Two in the Jungle	3 December 2023	Rami [Teemu R.]	Teemu R.	Barakuda	Rami
16	"Todellinen Selviytyjä"; True Survivor	10 December 2023	Teemu R.	Teemu R. Tytti	Barakuda	Sonja

== Voting history ==
	Original tribes			First switch		Second switch				Mergatory	Merged Tribe									
Episode	1		2	3	4	5	6		7	8	9	10	11	12		13	14	15		16
Day	3		6	8	10	13	16		19	21	23	25	27	29		31	33	35		36
Tribe	Sotong		Sotong	Sotong	Sotong	Ular	Sotong		Sotong	N/A	Barakuda	Barakuda	Barakuda	Barakuda		Barakuda	Barakuda	Barakuda		Barakuda
Eliminated	None	Niina	Rosanna	Roope	Lloyd	Ismo	Clarissa		Gogi	Kipa	Teemu L.	Alina	Riitta-Liisa	Viki		Sergey	Pinja	Rami		Sonja
Votes	~~7-2~~	Quit (Note: Rosanna got the most votes, but Niina decided to give up due to Mental issues. Because of this, Rosanna received the Black vote at the next Tribal Council, which means she has an extra vote waiting for her in the urn.)	5-3 (Note: Sonja played a lucky key on herself, as a result she was allowed to take one vote off any votes that were cast against her at that tribal council.)	7-1	6-1	1-0 (Note: Tytti played an immunity amulet, therefore six votes against her were not counted.)	6-2		3-2 (Note: Alina played a lucky key on herself, as a result she was allowed to take one vote off any votes that were cast against her at that tribal council.)	6-4 (Note: Kipa played a lucky key on herself, as a result she was allowed to take one vote off of any votes that were cast against her at that tribal council.)	6-4-0 (Note: Riitta-Liisa played a lucky key on herself, as result she was allowed to take one vote off of any votes that were cast against her.)	5-3-1	5-3	5-1	Duel	5-1	4-1	2-2	Duel	Challenge
Voter	Vote																			
Teemu R.						~~Tytti~~				Kipa	Teemu L.	Riitta-Liisa	Riitta-Liisa	Viki		Sergey	Pinja	Sonja		Won
Tytti	~~Rosanna~~		Sonja	Roope	Lloyd	Ismo				Rami	Pinja	Alina	Riitta-Liisa	Viki		Sergey	Pinja	Rami		Won
Sonja	~~Rosanna~~		Rosanna			~~Tytti~~				Kipa	Teemu L.	Alina	Tytti	None (Note: As Sonja finished last in the reward challenge, she had to compete in a duel at tribal council against the player who received the most votes.)	Won	Sergey	Pinja	Rami	Won	Lost
Rami							Clarissa		Alina	Kipa	Teemu L.	Riitta-Liisa	Riitta-Liisa	Viki		Sergey	Pinja	Sonja	Lost	
Pinja	~~Rosanna~~		Rosanna			~~Tytti~~				Kipa	Teemu L.	Alina	Tytti	Viki		Sergey	Rami			
Sergey				Roope	Lloyd	~~Tytti~~				Kipa	Teemu L.	Riitta-Liisa	Riitta-Liisa	Viki		Sonja				
Viki				Roope	Lloyd		Clarissa		Gogi	Kipa	Teemu L.	Alina	Riitta-Liisa	Sergey	Lost					
Riitta-Liisa	~~Rosanna~~		Rosanna	Roope	Lloyd	~~Tytti~~				Rami	Pinja	Alina	Tytti							
Alina	~~Rosanna~~		Sonja				Clarissa		Gogi	Rami	Pinja	Viki								
Teemu L.							Clarissa		Alina	Kipa	~~Riitta-Liisa~~									
Kipa	~~Rosanna~~		Rosanna	Roope	Lloyd		Alina		Gogi	Rami										
Gogi							Clarissa	Clarissa (Note: This player used an extra vote advantage, allowing them to cast two ballots during a single vote.)	Alina											
Clarissa	~~Niina~~		Sonja	Roope	Lloyd		Alina													
Ismo						~~Tytti~~														
Lloyd				Roope	Viki															
Roope				Viki																
Rosanna	~~Niina~~		Sonja																	
Niina	~~Rosanna~~																			
Penalty Votes			Rosanna								Pinja									
