= Madventures =

Madventures may refer to:

- Madventures (Finnish TV program), a 2002 Finnish travel documentary television program
- Madventures (Pakistani game show), a 2013 Pakistani adaptation of the popular reality show Fear Factor
