= Selviytyjät Suomi season 6 =

Selviytyjät Suomi
- Season 6
- Presented by: Juuso Mäkilähde
- No. of days: 36
- No. of castaways: 16
- Winner: Shirly Karvinen
- Runner-up: Paul Elias Uotila
- Location: Dominican Republic

Release
- Original network: Nelonen
- Original release: 29 August – 5 December 2021

Season chronology
- ← Previous; Season 5 Next → Season 7

Selviytyjät Suomi season 6 is the sixth season of the Finnish reality television series Selviytyjät Suomi. This season is filmed in the Dominican Republic where 16 celebrities are split into tribes and compete in challenges to survive and compete against each other to win €30,000. The season premiered on 29 August 2021 on Nelonen.

== Contestants ==
Contestant	Original Tribe	Swapped Tribe	Merged Tribe	Voted Out	Abandoned Island	Finish
Ella Toivainen; 23, Reality TV Star	Caleton			1st Voted Out; Day 3	Lost Challenge; Day 6	16th Day 8
Susanna Penttilä; 49, Fashion Entrepreneur	Caleton			2nd Voted Out; Day 5	Lost Challenge; Day 11	15th Day 10
Daniel "Dani" Lehtonen; 30, Reality TV Star	Caleton			Not Picked; Day 10	Lost Challenge; Day 12	14th Day 12
Aarni Mikkola; 28, Reality TV Star	Tórrido			3rd Voted Out; Day 9	Lost Challenge; Day 15	13th Day 15
Lauri Salovaara; 42, TV & Radio Presenter	Caleton	Caleton		6th Voted Out; Day 18	Lost Challenge; Day 19	12th Day 19
Paul Elias Uotila; Returned to Game	Tórrido	Tórrido		4th Voted Out; Day 12	1st Returnee; Day 19	
Jon-Jon Geitel; Returned to Game	Tórrido	Caleton		5th Voted Out; Day 15	2nd Returnee; Day 19	
Bea Toivonen; 28, Model	Caleton	Tórrido		7th Voted Out; Day 19		11th Day 19
Tuuli Oikarinen; 22, Singer	Caleton	Caleton	Culebra	8th Voted Out; 1st Jury Member; Day 21		10th Day 21
Jon-Jon Geitel; 31, Actor & Musician	Tórrido	Caleton	Culebra	9th Voted Out; 2nd Jury Member; Day 24		9th Day 24
Helmeri Pirinen; 33, Reality TV Star	Caleton	Tórrido	Culebra	10th Voted Out; 3rd Jury Member; Day 26		8th Day 26
Ville "Viki" Eerikkilä; 35, Radio Presenter	Caleton	Tórrido	Culebra	11th Voted Out; 4th Jury Member; Day 28		7th Day 28
Eija Kantola; 55, Singer	Tórrido	Tórrido	Culebra	12th Voted Out; 5th Jury Member; Day 30		6th Day 30
Sanna Pikkarainen; 38, TV Presenter	Tórrido	Caleton	Culebra	13th Voted Out; 6th Jury Member; Day 32		5th Day 32
Heikki Sorsa; 39, Former Snowboarder	Tórrido	Caleton	Culebra	14th Voted Out; 7th Jury Member; Day 34		4th Day 34
Eveliina Tistelgren; 30, Fitness Trainer & Influencer	Tórrido	Caleton	Culebra	15th Voted Out; 8th Jury Member; Day 36		3rd Day 36
Paul Elias Uotila; 30, Musician	Tórrido	Tórrido	Culebra	Runner-up; Day 36		2nd Day 36
Shirly Karvinen; 28, Model & Radio Presenter	Tórrido	Tórrido	Culebra	Sole Survivor; Day 36		1st Day 36

== Season summary ==
Episode	Air date	Challenges		Eliminated	Vote	Finish
Episode	Air date	Reward	Immunity	Eliminated	Vote	Finish
Episode 1	29 August 2021	Caleton	Tórrido	Ella	5-3	1st Voted Out; Day 3
Episode 2	5 September 2021	Tórrido	Tórrido	Susanna	6-1	2nd Voted Out; Day 6
Episode 3	12 September 2021	Tórrido	Caleton	Aarni	7-1	3rd Voted Out; Day 9
Episode 4	19 September 2021	Tórrido	Caleton	Daniel	0	Not Picked; Day 10
Episode 4	19 September 2021	Tórrido	Caleton	Paul	5-1	4th Voted Out; Day 12
Episode 5	26 September 2021	Caleton	Tórrido	Jon-Jon	5-1	5th Voted Out; Day 15
Episode 6	3 October 2021	Tórrido	Tórrido	Lauri	3-2	6th Voted Out; Day 18
Episode 7	10 October 2021	Heikki, Helmeri, Jon-Jon, Sanna, Ville		Bea	2-1-0 (Note: Paul played a hidden immunity idol on himself. As a result, 8 votes against him didn't count.)	7th Voted Out; Day 19
Episode 8	17 October 2021	Heikki {Tulli}	Paul	Tuuli	4-2-0 (Note: Jon-Jon played a hidden immunity idol on himself. As a result, 4 votes against him did not count.)	8th Voted Out; 1st Jury Member; Day 21
Episode 9	24 October 2021	Paul	Paul	Jon-Jon	5-3-1	9th Voted Out; 2nd Jury Member; Day 24
Episode 10	31 October 2021	Heikki, Helmeri, Shirly	Sanna	Helmeri	4-4 (Note: As a result of a tie, a re-vote occurred with only the two contestants (Helmeri and Eija) who received votes could be voted for.); 6-2	10th Voted Out; 3rd Jury Member; Day 26
Episode 11	7 November 2021	Paul {Eija}	Heikki	Ville	2-0 (Note: Paul played a hidden immunity idol on himself, as a result five votes against him did not count.)	11th Voted Out; 4th Jury Member; Day 28
Episode 12	14 November 2021	Survivor Auction	Paul	Eija	4-2	12th Voted Out; 5th Jury Member; Day 30
Episode 13	20 November 2021	Eveliina {Shirly}	Paul	Sanna	4-1	13th Voted Out; 6th Jury Member; Day 32
Episode 14	27 November 2021	Eveliina {Heikki}	Paul	Heikki	3-1	14th Voted Out; 7th Jury Member; Day 34
Episode 15	5 December 2021					15th Voted Out; 8th Jury Member; Day 36

== Voting history ==
#	Original Tribe				Switched Tribes
Episode	1	2	3	4	
Day	3	5	8	10	11
Voted out	Ella	Susanna	Aarni	Dani	Paul
Votes	5-2-1	6-1	7-1	Duel (Note: As Jon-Jon was not picked to be in any tribe, he gets to choose one person to compete in a duel to take their place, he chose Dani. Jon-Jon wins and joins Caléton, while Dani looses, thus eliminating him from the game.)	5-1
Bea	Ella	Susanna			Paul
Eija			Aarni		Paul
Eveliina			Aarni		
Heikki			Aarni		
Helmeri	Ella	Susanna			Paul
Jon-Jon			Aarni	Won	
Lauri	Ella	Susanna			
Sanna			Aarni		
Shirly			Aarni		Paul
Tuuli	Susanna	Susanna			
Viki	Ella	Susanna			Paul
Paul			Aarni		Eija
Dani	Ella	Susanna		Lost	
Aarni			Sanna		
Susanna	Viki	Viki			
Ella	Susanna				
