= Ylläs =

Fell in Kolari, Finland

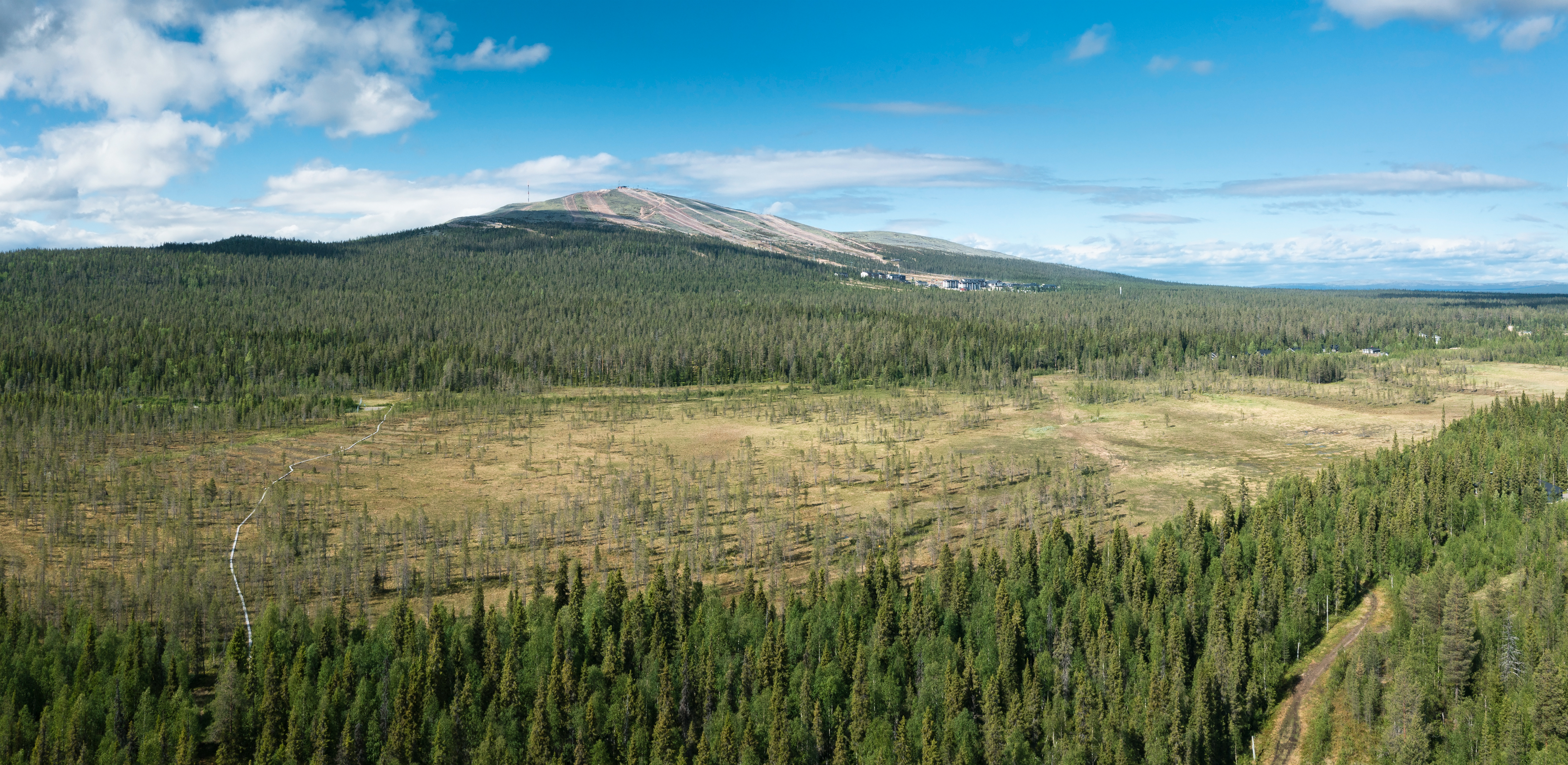
- Ylläs as seen over Takavuoma bog

Highest point
- Elevation: 719 m (2,359 ft)
- Prominence: 481 m (1,578 ft)
- Coordinates: 67°33′52″N 24°13′28″E

Geography
- Location within Finland
- Location: Kolari, Lapland, Finland

Ylläs
- Interactive map of Ylläs
- Location: Finnish Lapland
- Nearest city: Kittilä, Finland
- Longest run: 3 km (1.9 mi)
- Lift system: T-bar, Chairlift, Gondola
- Snowfall: Yes
- Snowmaking: Yes (partial)
- Night skiing: Yes
- Website: Official Site

Ylläs, or Yllästunturi in Finnish, is a 719-metre (2,359 ft) high fell in the municipality of Kolari in the Finnish Lapland. There are two villages near Ylläs: Äkäslompolo on the north side and Ylläsjärvi in the south. They are connected by an 11 km road, around the side of the fell. Both villages derive much of their income from tourism.

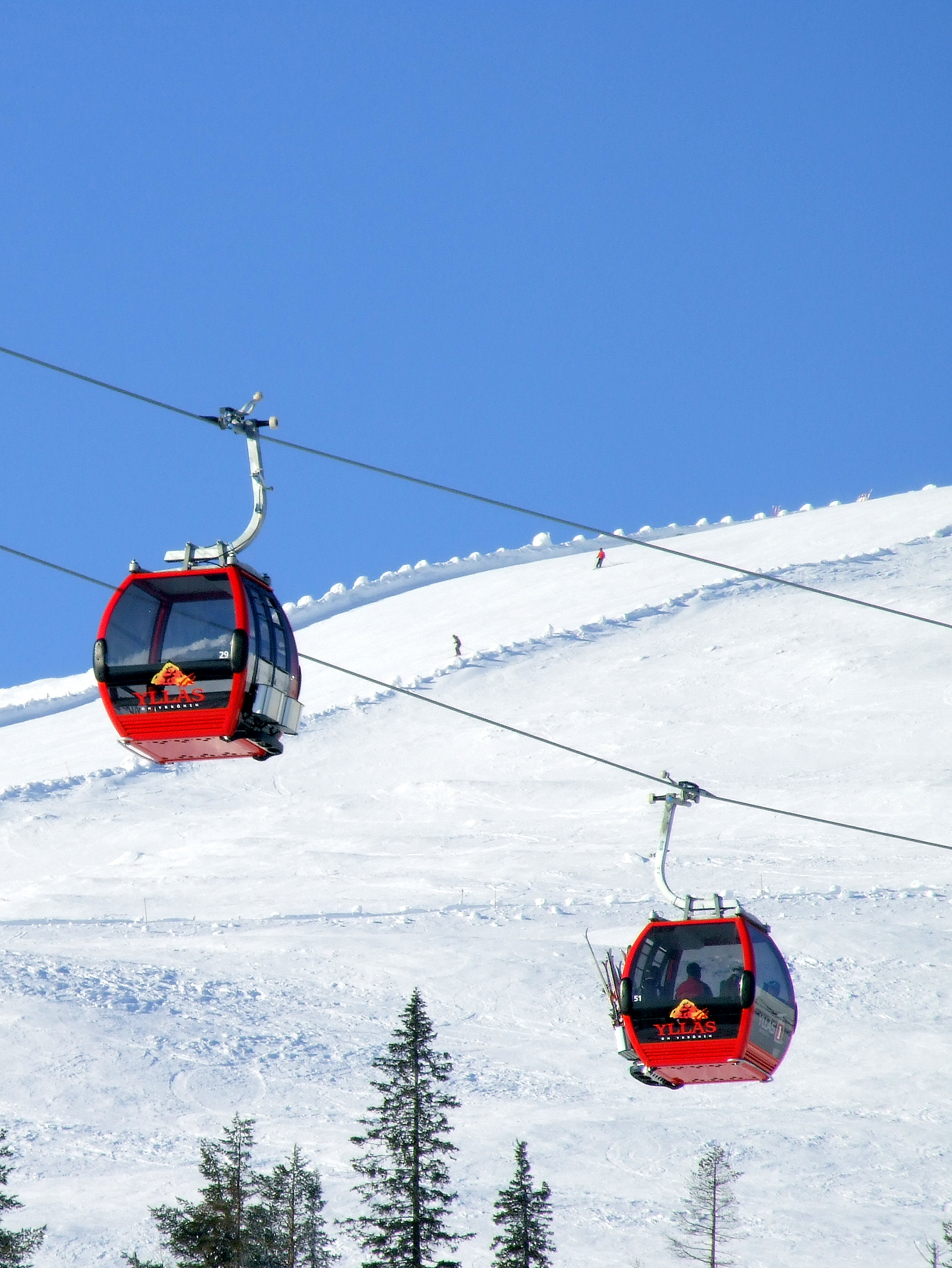
Gondola lift in Ylläs

Ylläs is a popular cross country and downhill skiing centre. The area's marketing slogan is "Ylläs on ykkönen!" (Finnish for "Ylläs is number one!"). Ylläs is the second largest ski resort in Lapland, after Levi. Many companies in the vicinity of Ylläs have taken the fell's name as part of their own, such as the Ylläksen Nousu sports club in Äkäslompolo.

Ylläs is the highest fell in Finland where you can find skiing lifts.

In the Ylläs area there are:

- 330 kilometres (210 mi) cross-country skiing tracks, 38 kilometres (24 mi) of which are lit
- 61 ski slopes
- 29 ski lifts

Other fells near Ylläs are Kukastunturi, Lainiotunturi, Kuertunturi, Kesänki, Pyhätunturi and Aakenustunturi.

The nearest railway station is at Kolari (37 km/23 mi distance with direct trains to Helsinki) and the nearest airport is Kittilä Airport (39 km/24 mi distance).

Ylläs was the host of the thirteenth 1995 Winter Deaflympics.

Ylläs is also a popular tourist destination during the summer months with activities such as hiking, biking, fishing and canoeing. The gondola is open during the summer season.

On the summit of Ylläs, there is a 126.2 metres tall guyed mast used for FM- and TV-broadcasting.

At Ylläs, there is a 2 kilometre long gondola lift, which is the tallest in Finland. One of the cabins of this lift can be used as sauna. It is the only sauna in a gondola lift cabin in the world .

== See also ==
- Pallas, Finland
- Levi, Finland
