= Äkäslompolo =

Village in the municipality of Kolari in Finland

Coordinates: 67.604311°N 24.155451°E

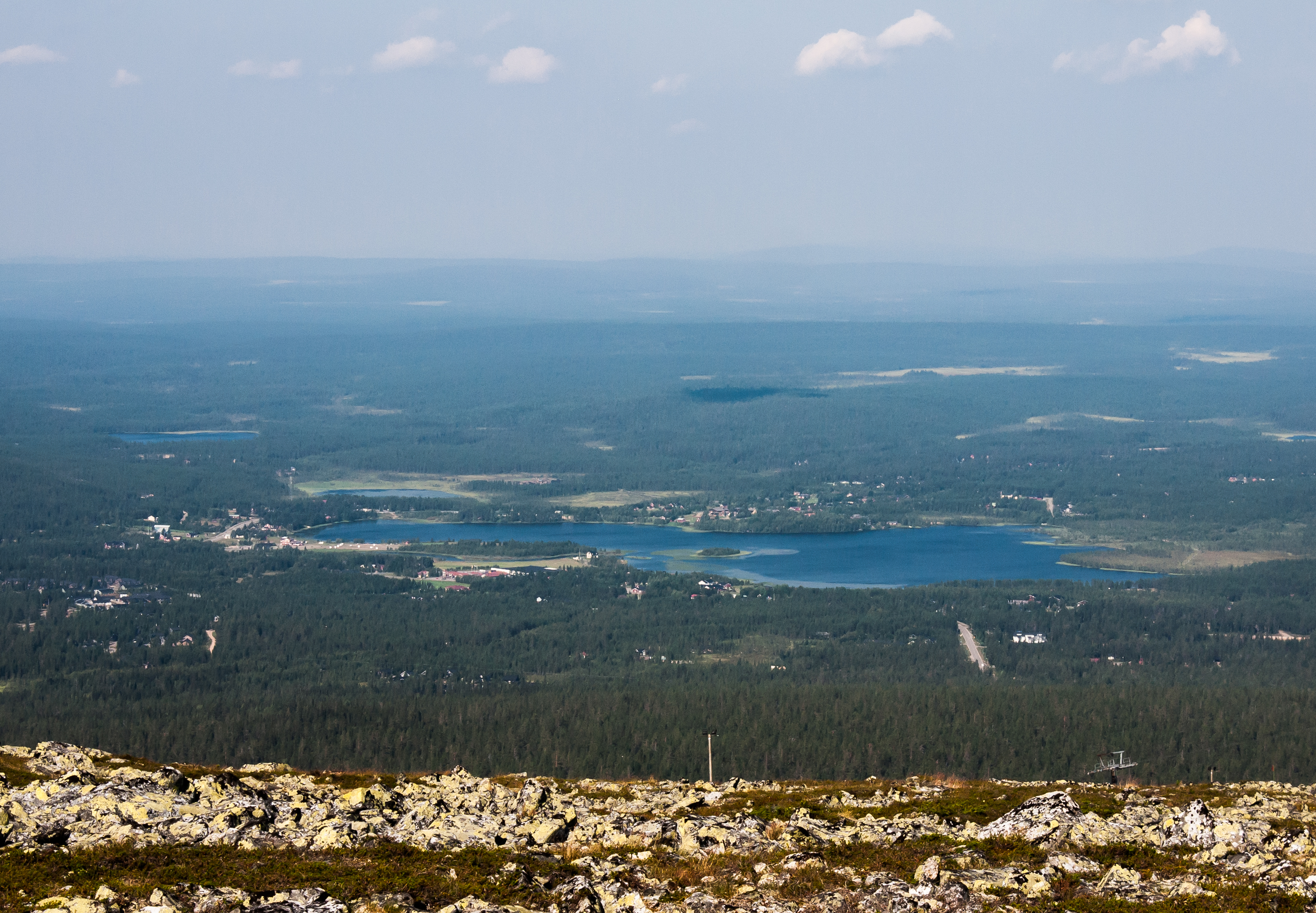
Äkäslompolo seen from the Ylläs fell.

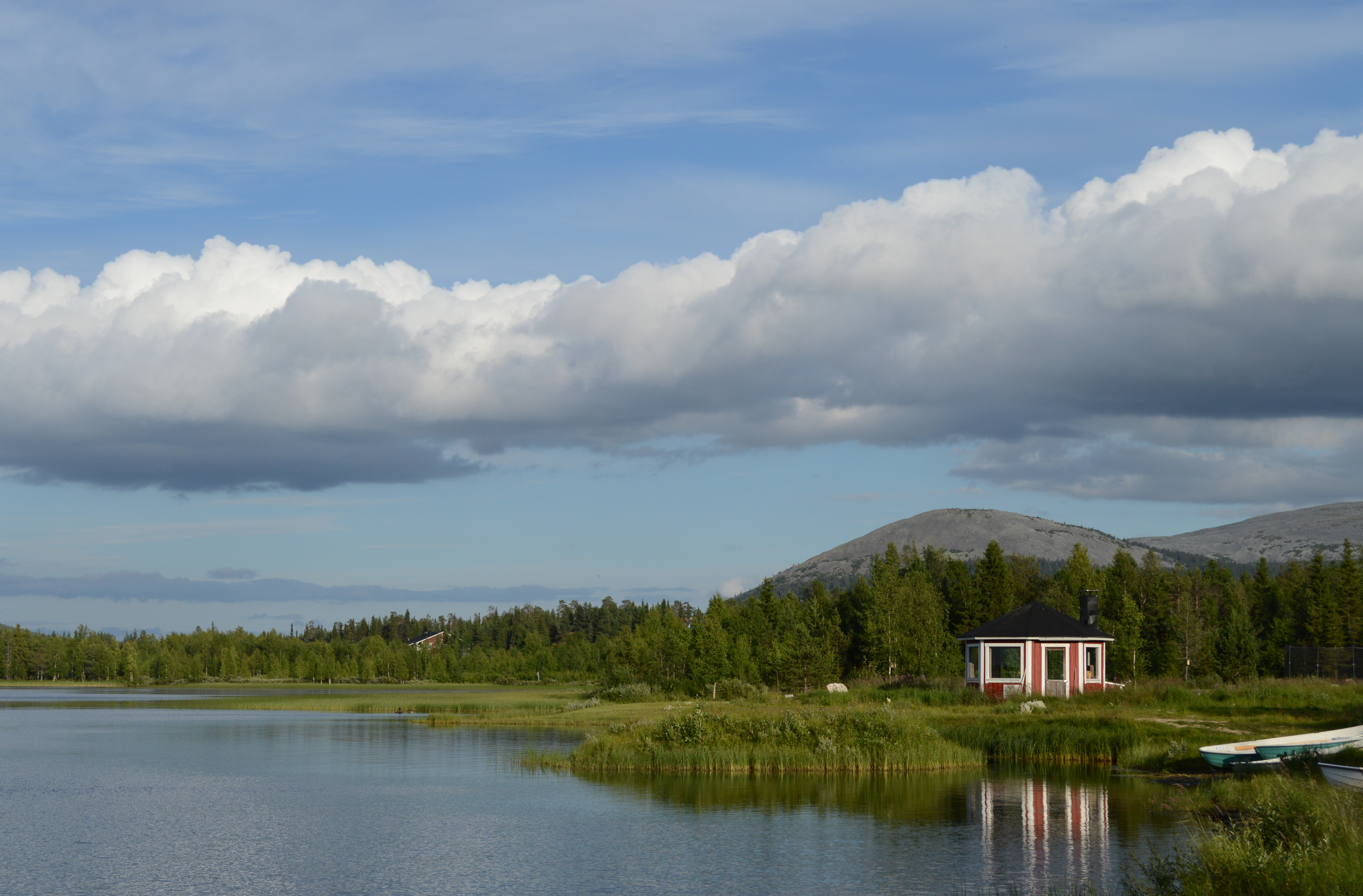
The shores of Lake Äkäslompolo, 2017.

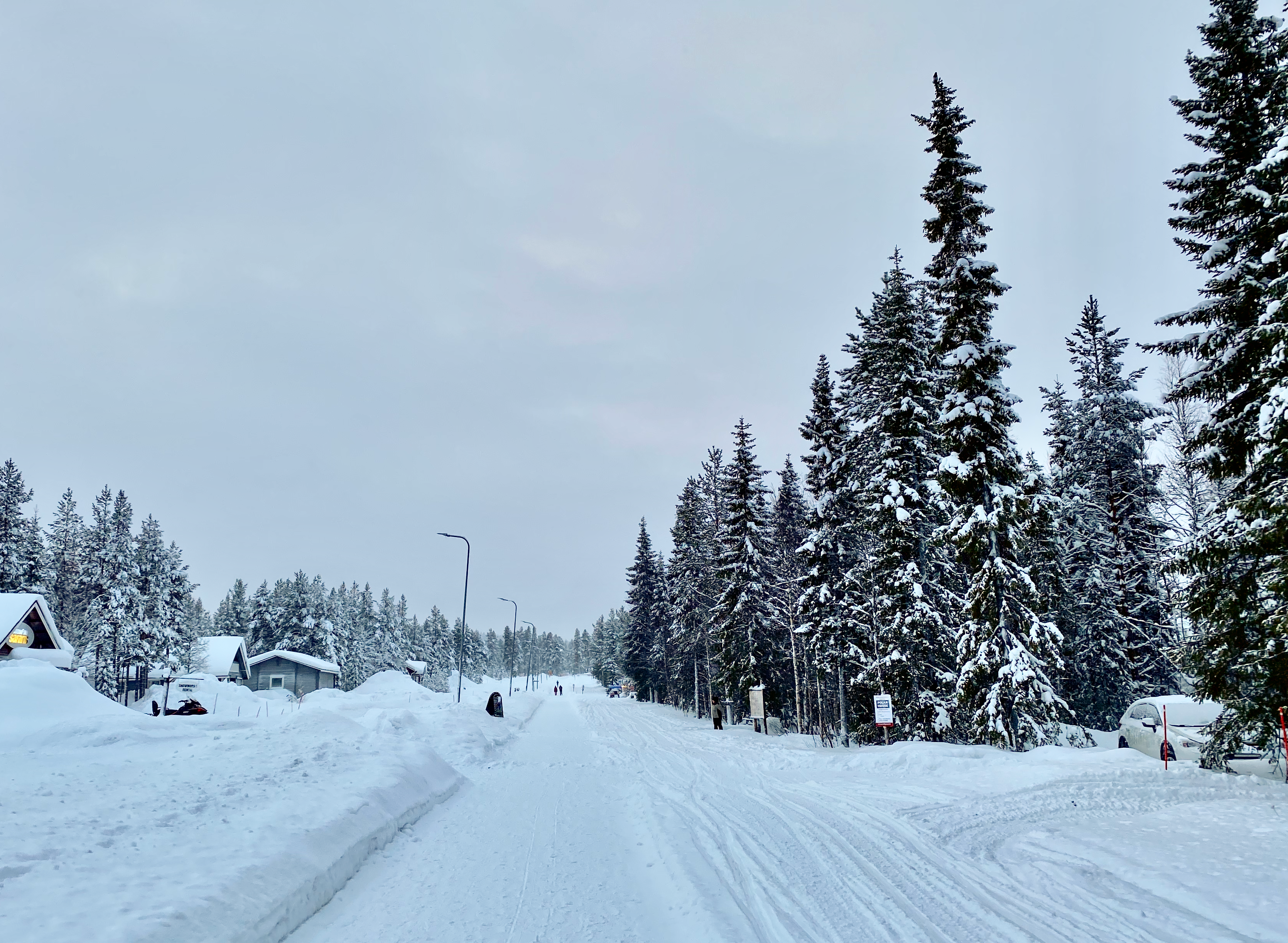
Winter in Äkäslompolo, Lapland (2024)

Äkäslompolo (Finnish pronunciation: [ˈækæsˌlompolo]) is a village in the municipality of Kolari in Finland's Lapland region. It is situated next to a lake of the same name, north-east of the town of Kolari. Äkäslompolo had 587 inhabitants on December 31, 2022.

Äkäslompolo is, along with Ylläsjärvi, the primary town for the ski resort Yllästunturi, also known as Ylläs for short. The Ylläs ski area has a total of 330 km of cross-country ski tracks, and 61 Alpine ski slopes with 29 ski lifts. In summer Äkäslompolo is popular among hikers, anglers, canoeists, and other outdoor enthusiasts. There are several hotels and many holiday homes in the area.

== See also ==
- Jounin Kauppa
