= Selviytyjät Suomi season 4 =

Selviytyjät Suomi
- Season 4
- Presented by: Juuso Mäkilähde
- No. of days: 32
- No. of castaways: 16
- Winner: Kai Fagerlund
- Runner-up: Viivi Vaattovaara
- Location: Caramoan, Philippines
- No. of episodes: 15

Release
- Original network: Nelonen
- Original release: 8 September – 15 December 2019

Season chronology
- ← Previous; Season 3 Next → Season 5

Selviytyjät Suomi season 4 is the fourth season of the Finnish reality show Selviytyjät Suomi based on the Swedish reality series Expedition Robinson. This season, eight celebrities face off against eight ordinary Finns for 32 days in Caramoan, Philippines, to try to avoid being voted off and to be the last one standing and claim €30,000 and the title of Sole Survivor. The season aired from 8 September 2019 and concluded on 15 December the same year when Kai Fagerlund won against Viivi Vaattovaara in a 5–4 jury vote and became the first non-celebrity since 2013 to claim the title of Sole Survivor. (Note: Even though there are only 8 jurors, Nora was allowed to cast two votes as she was the last to be eliminated before final tribal council.)

== Finishing order ==
| Contestant | Original tribe | Swapped tribe | Merged tribe | Voted out | Expulsion Island | Finish |
|---|---|---|---|---|---|---|
| Alma Hätönen; 29, Helsinki; Radio and TV presenter | Kuwago | | | 1st Voted Out; Day 3 | | 16th |
| Arttu Lindeman; 22, Lahti; Rapper | Kuwago | | | Left Competition; Day 6 | | 15th |
| Tommi Läntinen; 59, Espoo; Singer | Kuwago | Carabao | | 2nd Voted Out; Day 9 | | 14th |
| Kimmo Nupponen; 57, Lahti | Carabao | Kuwago | | 3rd Voted Out; Day 11 | | 13th |
| Markus Pöyhönen; 40, Helsinki; Former Track & Field athlete | Kuwago | Carabao | | 5th Voted Out; Day 15 | | 12th |
| Janne Karjala; 35, Oulu | Carabao | Carabao | | 4th Voted Out; Day 13 | Lost Duel; Day 16 | 11th |
| Anu Toikka; Returned to Game | Carabao | Kuwago | | 6th Voted Out; Day 16 | Won Duel; Day 16 | |
| Sara Sieppi; 27, Helsinki; TV Presenter | Kuwago | Kuwago | Buhawi | 7th Voted Out; 1st jury member Day 18 | | 10th |
| Petra Gargano; 33, Helsinki; Singer | Kuwago | Kuwago | Buhawi | 8th Voted Out; 2nd jury member Day 20 | | 9th |
| Inga Chaudary; 50, Espoo | Carabao | Carabao | Buhawi | 9th Voted Out; 3rd jury member Day 22 | | 8th |
| Kasperi Kauppinen; 21, Turku | Carabao | Carabao | Buhawi | 10th Voted Out; 4th jury member Day 24 | | 7th |
| Anu Toikka; 42, Vierumäki | Carabao | Kuwago | Buhawi | 11th Voted Out; 5th jury member Day 26 | | 6th |
| Juhani Koskinen; 32, Turku; TV Personality | Kuwago | Kuwago | Buhawi | 12th Voted Out; 6th jury member Day 28 | | 5th |
| Taina Ojaniemi; 42, Pori; Former Javelin Thrower | Kuwago | Carabao | Buhawi | Lost Challenge; 7th jury member Day 31 | | 4th |
| Nora Kuitunen; 24, Vantaa | Carabao | Carabao | Buhawi | 13th Voted Out; 8th jury member Day 32 | | 3rd |
| Viivi Vaattovaara; 25, Milan, Italy | Carabao | Kuwago | Buhawi | Runner-up; Day 32 | | 2nd |
| Kai Fagerlund; 27, Vantaa | Carabao | Kuwago | Buhawi | Sole Survivor; Day 32 | | 1st |

== Externtal links ==
- Official website
