= Suomen Robinson =

- Created by: Charlie Parsons
- Theme music composer: Andreas Nordqvist
- Country of origin: Finland
- Original language: Finnish
- No. of seasons: 2

Original release
- Network: Nelonen
- Release: 25 January 2004 – 16 December 2005

Related
- Selviytyjät Suomi; Survivor

Suomen Robinson is the Finnish reality television program debuted in 2004.

In the spring of 2004, Nelonen purchased the broadcast rights to air their own version of Expedition Robinson. Seeing the success of the Danish, Norwegian, and Swedish versions of the show, TV4 assumed that their own version would also be a huge success. They were wrong in their assumption, and due to competition from shows like Big Brother, the show was cancelled due to low ratings following the second season.

The name alludes to both Robinson Crusoe and The Swiss Family Robinson, two stories featuring people marooned by shipwrecks.

== Format ==
The Robinson format was developed by Planet 24, a United Kingdom TV production company owned by Charlie Parsons and Bob Geldof. Their company Castaway Television Productions retained the rights to the concept when they sold Planet 24 in 1999. Mark Burnett later licensed the format to create the American show Survivor in 2000.

Sixteen contestants are put into a survival situation and compete in a variety of physical challenges. Early in each season two tribes compete but later on the tribes are merged and the competitions become individual. At the end of each episode, one contestant is eliminated from the show by the others in a secret "island council" ballot.

== Seasons ==
Year	Host	Channel	Participants	Winner
2004	Jarmo Mäkinen	Nelonen	16	Marjaana Valkeinen
2005	Arttu Harkki	Nelonen	18	Mira Jantunen
