= Selviytyjät Suomi 2013 =

- Season 2013
- Presented by: Heikki Paasonen
- No. of days: 34
- No. of castaways: 16
- Winner: Jarkko Kortesoja
- Runner-up: Heini Pitkänen
- Location: Borneo, Malaysia

Release
- Original release: 21 February – 28 April 2013

Season chronology
- Next → Selviytyjät Suomi 2018

Selviytyjät Suomi 2013 is the first season of the Finnish version of Survivor which is based on the Swedish reality television show Expedition Robinson. This season aired on the television channel MTV3. This season consists of 16 contestants who are put into two tribes of eight, trying to outlast everyone else to win €50,000. The season aired from 21 February to 28 April 2013 where Jarkko Kortesoja won in a 6-1 jury vote over Heini Pitkänen.

== Finishing order ==
Contestant	Original Tribe	Merged Tribe	Finish
Minna Sammatti; 44, Riihimäki	Rawa		1st Voted Out; Day 2
Andrea Eckstein; 22, Vaasa	Rawa		2nd Voted Out; Day 4
Hanna Hyttinen; 26, Vantaa	Rawa		3rd Voted Out; Day 8
Jukka-Pekka "JP" Järvinen; 61, Tampere	Harimau		4th Voted Out; Day 11
Henri Tienvieri; 26, Tampere	Harimau		5th Voted Out; Day 16
Joonas Luotonen; 22, Tampere	Rawa		Left Competition; Day 16
Sari Ekorre-Nummikari; 44, Kemi	Harimau		5th Voted Out; Day 19
Nora Vuorio; 31, Helsinki	Rawa	Baru-Baru	6th Voted Out; 1st Jury Member; Day 24
Janne Ponko; 38, Helsinki	Rawa	Baru-Baru	7th Voted Out; 2nd Jury Member; Day 28
Harri Mauno; 28, Espoo	Rawa	Baru-Baru	8th Voted Out; 3rd Jury Member; Day 32
Aki Rundgren; 46, Kolari	Rawa	Baru-Baru	9th Voted Out; 4th Jury Member; Day 36
Hanna Vaittinen; 28, Helsinki	Harimau	Baru-Baru	10th Voted Out; 5th Jury Member; Day 36
Pia Partanen; 45, Helsinki	Harimau	Baru-Baru	Lost Challenge; 6th Jury Member; Day 39
Jani Pitkänen; 37, Kallio	Harimau	Baru-Baru	11th Voted Out; 7th Jury Member; Day 39
Heini Pitkänen; 28, Helsinki; Singer	Harimau	Baru-Baru	Runner-up; Day 39
Jarkko Kortesoja; 41, Turenki	Harimau	Baru-Baru	Sole Survivor; Day 39

== Challenges ==
Challenge winners and eliminations by episode
Air Date	Challenge winner(s)		Eliminated	Vote	Finish
Air Date	Reward	Immunity	Eliminated	Vote	Finish
21 February 2013	Harimau	Harimau	Minna	7-1	1st voted out Day 2
24 February 2013	Harimau	Harimau	Andrea	5-1-1	2nd voted out Day 4
28 February 2013	Harimau	Harimau	Hanna H.	4-1-1	3rd voted out Day 8
3 March 2013	Harimau	Harimau	Hanna H.	4-1-1	3rd voted out Day 8
7 March 2013	Rawa	Rawa	JP	7-1	4th voted out Day 11
10 March 2013	Rawa	Rawa	JP	7-1	4th voted out Day 11
14 March 2013	Rawa	Harimau	Henri	no vote	Quit; Day 16
17 March 2013	Rawa	Harimau	Henri	no vote	Quit; Day 16
21 March 2013	Harimau	Rawa	Joonas	no vote	Quit; Day 16
24 March 2013	Harimau	Rawa	Sari	5-0	5th voted out Day 19
28 March 2013	Jarkko	~~Nora~~ (Harri)	Nora	5-4	6th voted out 1st Jury Member; Day 24
31 March 2013	Jarkko	~~Nora~~ (Harri)	Nora	5-4	6th voted out 1st Jury Member; Day 24
4 April 2013	~~Janne~~ (Hanna V. Heini)	Harri	Janne	4-3	7th voted out 2nd Jury Member; Day 28
7 April 2013	~~Janne~~ (Hanna V. Heini)	Harri	Janne	4-3	7th voted out 2nd Jury Member; Day 28
11 April 2013	Aki, Hanna V., Jani, Jarkko	Jarkko	Harri	5-2	8th voted out 3rd Jury Member; Day 32
14 April 2013	Aki, Hanna V., Jani, Jarkko	Jarkko	Harri	5-2	8th voted out 3rd Jury Member; Day 32
18 April 2013	Aki, Hanna V., Heini	Jani			
21 April 2013	Aki, Hanna V., Heini	Jani	Aki	2-1-0-0	9th voted out 4th Jury Member; Day 36
21 April 2013	Aki, Hanna V., Heini	Jani	Hanna V.	2-1-0-0	10th voted out 5th Jury; Day 36
25 April 2013	Jani [Jarkko]	Heini	Pia	no vote	Eliminated; 6th Jury Member; Day 39
28 April 2013	Jani [Jarkko]	Heini	Jani	1-0	11th voted 0ut 7th Jury Member; Day 39
28 April 2013	Jury vote		Heini	1/7 votes	Runner Up; Day 39
28 April 2013	Jury vote		Jarkko	6/7 votes	Sole Survivor; Day 39

== Voting history ==
	Original tribes								Merged tribe								
Episode #	1	2	4	6	8		9	10	12	14	16	18		19	20	Jury Vote	
Day #	2	4	8	11	16			19	24	28	32	36		39			
Eliminated	Minna	Andrea	Hanna H.	JP	Null	Henri	Joonas	Sari	Nora	Janne	Harri	Aki	Hanna V.	Pia	Jani	Heini	Jarkko
Votes	7-1	5-1-1	4-1-1	7-1	~~4-1~~ (Note: Although the Rawa tribe voted first, Henri declared after the vote that he was quitting. However, Rawa's votes had already been counted. Because of this, Joonas would therefore receive a "dark vote" in his next Tribal Council.)	Quit (Note: This player chose to quit the game.)	Quit	5-0 (Note: An Immunity Coin was played, negating all votes against its user.)	5-4	4-3	5-2	2-1-0-0 (Note: The two castaways who received the most votes were both voted out.)		None	1-0	6-1	
Voter	Vote																
Jarkko				JP				Sari	Nora	Janne	Harri	Hanna V.			None		
Heini				JP				Sari	Nora	Janne	Harri	~~Pia~~			Jani		
Jani				JP				Sari	Nora	Janne	Harri	Aki			None		Jarkko
Pia				JP				Sari	Nora	Janne	Harri	~~Jarkko~~		Eliminated			Jarkko
Hanna V.				JP				Sari	Nora	None (Note: This castaway placed last in the Immunity Challenge, losing their right to vote.)	Harri	Aki				Heini	
Aki	Minna	Andrea	Joonas		~~Joonas~~				Jani	Pia	Pia	~~Pia~~					Jarkko
Harri	Minna	Andrea	Hanna H.		~~Joonas~~				Jani	Pia	Pia						Jarkko
Janne	Minna	Andrea	Hanna H.		~~Joonas~~				Jani	Pia							Jarkko
Nora	Minna	Andrea	Hanna H.		~~Joonas~~				Jani								Jarkko
Sari				JP				~~Pia~~									
Joonas	Minna	Andrea	Hanna H.		~~Harri~~												
Henri				JP													
JP				Sari													
Hanna H.	Minna	Andrea	Aki														
Andrea	Minna	Aki															
Minna	Janne																
