= Jounin Kauppa =

Supermarket and family business in Äkäslompolo, Kolari, Finnish Lapland

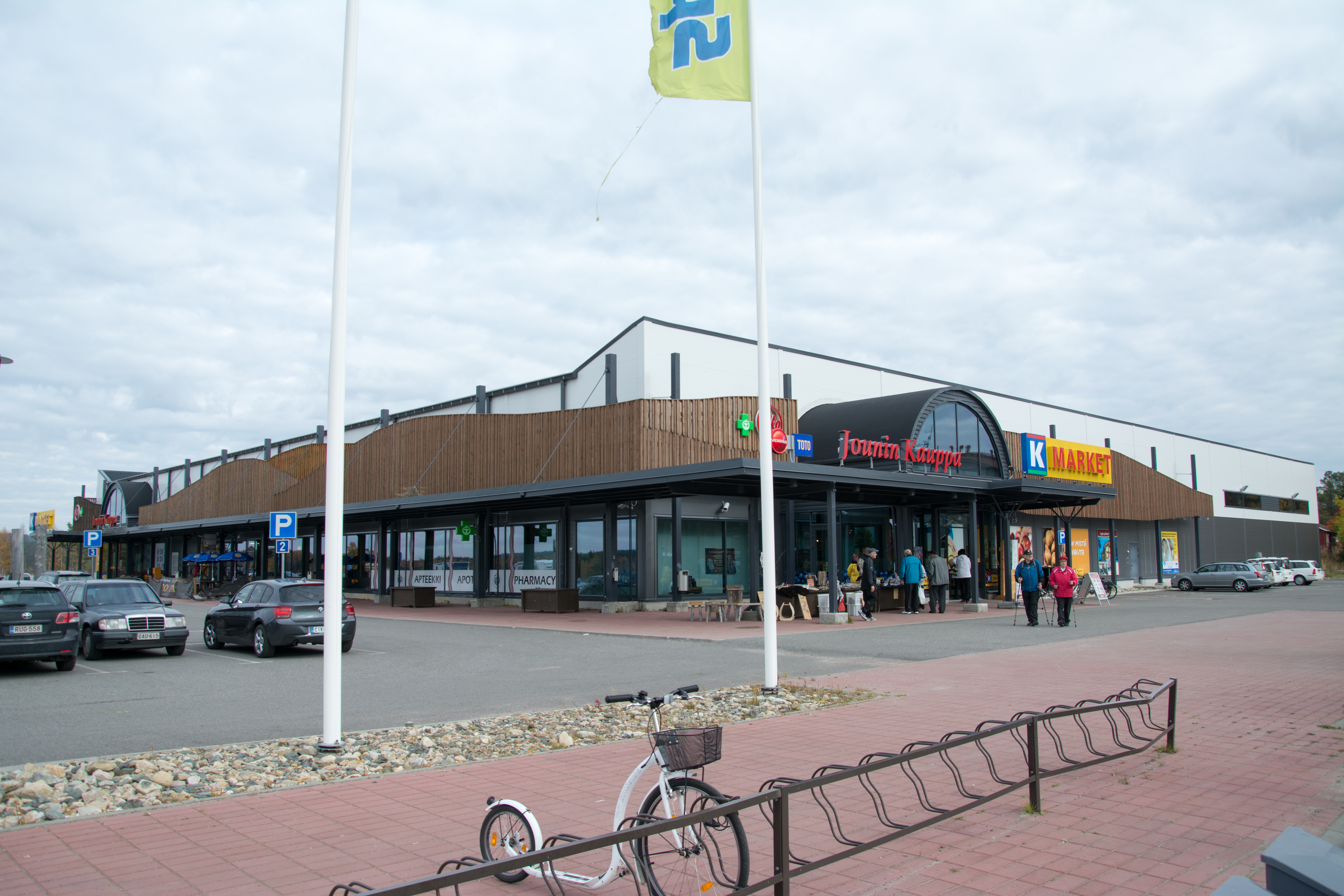
The Jounin Kauppa supermarket in Äkäslompolo

Jounin Kauppa (Finnish for Jouni's Store) is a supermarket and family business in the village of Äkäslompolo, Kolari in Finnish Lapland. The supermarket operates under the K-Market chain and brand, part of the Kesko conglomerate. The store has a surface area of 2 000 square meters, making it the biggest store under the Finnish K-Market chain.

== History ==
The store was originally founded in 1950 by Jouni Kaulanen, in the downstairs of his house, where it operated until the 1980s. He kept the shop for over four decades, after which his children and wife continued operations. Since 2008, the store is managed by Jouni Kaulanen's grandson, Sampo Kaulanen.

=== Generational shift ===
The current manager of Jounin Kauppa, Sampo Kaulanen, is well known in Finland for his social media marketing and award-winning reality TV show. He is described as colorful, outspoken and likeable. He has been candid about receiving help from his mother with running the business after taking over and nearly going out of business due to financial pressures and personal struggles, such as addictions. Kaulanen also speaks openly about being diagnosed with ADHD and dyslexia.

Sampo Kaulanen has arranged various contests under the brand of his store on social media, and the store also operates as a web e-commerce destination. Jounin Kauppa has over half a million followers on Facebook, and over 34 thousand followers on YouTube.
