= Suomen Robinson 2004 =

- Season 1
- Presented by: Jarmo Mäkinen
- No. of days: 39
- No. of castaways: 16
- Winner: Marjaana Valkeinen
- Runner-up: Johanna Ullakko
- Location: Malaysia

Release
- Original network: Nelonen
- Original release: 25 January – 2 May 2004

Additional information
- Filming dates: July – August 2003

Season chronology
- Next → Suomen Robinson 2005

Suomen Robinson 2004, was the first season of the Finnish version of Expedition Robinson, or Survivor as it is referred to in some countries and it premiered on 25 January 2004 and concluded on 2 May 2004. The show adapted many elements from the original Swedish version of the show such as the use of green and yellow for tribe colors, but instead of the typical North and South teams, there were the Sribuat and Sembilang tribes. During the early portion of the program the Sribuat tribe proved to be the stronger of the two as they won four of the six immunity challenges. When the two ribes merged into the Tengah tribe, the former members of quickly turned against each other as Heidi Moilanen, Ingmar Sirén, and Johanna Ullakko joined forces with Gun Sundqvist, Jarmo Hänninen, and Marjaana Valkeinen to form a powerful six person alliance. When it came time for the final four the contestants competed in a challenge in order to determine who would be the final two. Ultimately, it was Marjaana Valkeinen who won the season over Johanna Ullakko by a 5-3 jury vote to be crowned Robinson 2004 and win €40,000.

== Finishing order ==
| Contestant | Original Tribes | Merged Tribe | Finish |
|---|---|---|---|
| Kitty Nordberg; 48, Helsinki | Sembilang | | 1st Voted Out; Day 3 |
| Anita Johansson; 50, Kuopio | Sribuat | | 2nd Voted Out; Day 6 |
| Susanna Carlstedt; 25, Jakobstad | Sembilang | | 3rd Voted Out; Day 9 |
| Pekka Saurio; 50, Turku | Sembilang | | 4th Voted Out; Day 12 |
| Ilkka Heinänen; 32, Helsinki | Sembilang | | 5th Voted Out; Day 15 |
| Tero Moliis; 30, Monterrey, Mexico | Sribuat | | 6th Voted Out; Day 18 |
| Jouni Lehtimäki; 39, Pori | Sembilang | Tengah | 7th Voted Out; 1st Jury Member; Day 21 |
| Veijo Sievilä; 22, Jyväskylä | Sribuat | Tengah | 8th Voted Out; 2nd Jury Member; Day 24 |
| Mappela Lehtonen; 22, Mikkeli | Sribuat | Tengah | 9th Voted Out; 3rd Jury Member; Day 27 |
| Esko Vesanko; 45, Espoo | Sribuat | Tengah | 10th Voted Out; 4th Jury Member; Day 30 |
| Jarmo Hänninen; 39, Nurmijärvi | Sembilang | Tengah | 11th Voted Out; 5th Jury Member; Day 33 |
| Gun Sundqvist; 26, Jakobstad | Sembilang | Tengah | 12th Voted Out; 6th Jury Member; Day 36 |
| Ingmar Sirén; 70, Espoo | Sribuat | Tengah | Lost Challenge; 7th Jury Member; Day 37 |
| Heidi Moilanen; 24, Jyväskylä | Sribuat | Tengah | Lost Challenge; 8th Jury Member; Day 38 |
| Johanna Ullakko; 33, Helsinki | Sribuat | Tengah | Runner-Up; Day 39 |
| Marjaana Valkeinen; 43, Keuruu | Sembilang | Tengah | Sole Survivor; Day 39 |
