= Madventures (Finnish TV program) =

Finnish travel television series

- Genre: Travel; Documentary
- Created by: Riku Rantala; Tuomas Milonoff
- Presented by: Riku Rantala; Tuomas Milonoff
- Starring: Riku Rantala; Tuomas Milonoff
- Composers: Tero Civill (2005); Zarkus Poussa (2009)
- Country of origin: Finland
- Original languages: Finnish; English
- No. of series: 3
- No. of episodes: 49

Production
- Cinematography: Riku Rantala; Tuomas Milonoff
- Running time: Series 1: 50 minutes Series 2: 35 minutes Series 3: 22 minutes (international); Series 3: 28–38 minutes (Finland)

Original release
- Network: Sub; Fiver; Travel Channel
- Release: October 13, 2002

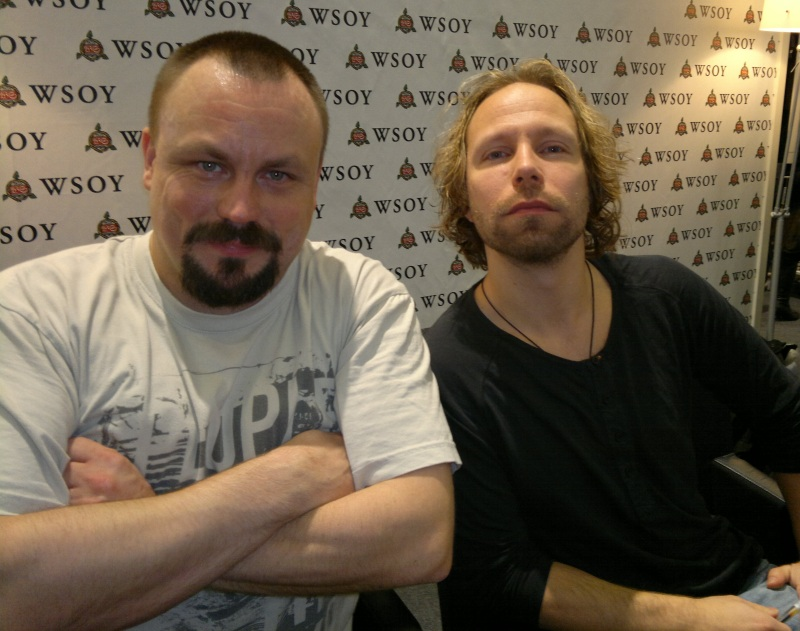
Riku Rantala (left) and Tuomas Milonoff in 2011

Madventures is a Finnish travel documentary television series that focuses on backpacking in lesser-visited or lesser-known destinations. It follows Finnish journalist Riku Rantala and Tuomas "Tunna" Milonoff. As the show's directors and cameramen, they travel around the world to explore different cultures.

They emphasize that they are on a journey, not a holiday. The show often features local practices that are culturally unacceptable or controversial where the episodes air, to the point where the showmakers have been accused of deliberate, excessive use of shock imagery.

The show premiered in Finland on the channel Sub, on 13 October 2002. Its international premiere was in the United States on the Travel Channel on 21 September 2009. The United Kingdom premiere on Fiver is not yet decided. Originally Internationally, Madventures is distributed by the Target Entertainment Group.

The show includes a "MadCook" section, in which the travellers attempt to eat some of the least favoured dishes around the world (e.g. monkey brains in the Amazon rainforest and dog meat in Bali). Another lighthearted feature is the waking-up scenes, where Milonoff will often shock Rantala while he is still asleep.

== Production ==
The travel documentary is made on a relatively low budget with no major production crew but rather just the two presenters travelling together with the film equipment.

Riku Rantala is the writer, presenter and producer of the program, while Tuomas "Tunna" Milonoff directs and films.

The first two seasons were made in Finnish, but for international audiences, season three of the show was sold to the Travel Channel and Fiver and the language was switched to English. The third series was broadcast starting in Finland in early April 2009 with each episode being ten minutes longer than the international version.

== Episodes ==
The program started as a gonzo documentary about the backpacking culture and the travel stories of the protagonists. The second series added a bit more social criticism to the mix whereas the third series concentrates on cultural and sociological extremes.

The following is a comprehensive list of Madventures episodes, excluding DVD extras. The original runtime of episodes was 50 minutes. For the second series the channel decided to halve the duration of episodes.

=== Season 1 (2002) ===
1. Nepal – Kathmandu
2. Nepal – Kathmandu, Chitwan, Annapurna
3. India – Varanasi, Delhi, Rajasthan
4. India – Pushkar, Rishikesh
5. India – Goa / Cambodia – Phnom Penh
6. Cambodia – Phnom Penh, Siem Reap, Sihanoukville
7. Thailand – Koh Phangan, Koh Tao
8. Thailand – Koh Tao, Bangkok, Krabi
9. Indonesia – Medan, Lake Toba, Bali / Malesia – Penang / Singapore
10. Indonesia – Bali, Sumba
11. Indonesia – Sumba, Bali
12. Australia – Sydney / New Zealand – Auckland / Tonga
13. Tonga
14. Tonga – Peru
15. Amazonia
16. Peru & Ecuador
17. USA – California
18. USA – Las Vegas
19. USA – Las Vegas – Memphis
20. Finland – Helsinki
21. Mad Cook Special 1
22. Mad Cook Special 2
23. Madventures – Pahimmat iskut 1
24. Madventures – Pahimmat iskut 2

=== Season 2 (2005) ===
1. Jamaica
2. Tokyo
3. Japan
4. China
5. Tibet
6. West Papua
7. Cuba
8. Africa 1
9. Africa 2
10. Indochina 1
11. Indochina 2
12. Mad Cook Special
13. Best of Madventures II
14. Madventures Radalla (Loaded)
15. Madventures Koukussa (Hooked)

=== Season 3 (2009, Finnish broadcast) ===
1. Amazonas
2. Ex-CCCP
3. West Africa
4. Felix Arabia
5. Nippon
6. Hindustan
7. China
8. Papua Niugini
9. Philippines
10. Southeast Asia - Burma, Thailand & Vietnam

=== Season 3 (2009, Travel Channel broadcast) ===
1. Brazil (21 September)
2. Southeast Asia (21 September)
3. Japan (28 September)
4. Russia/Ukraine (28 September)
5. Philippines (5 October)
6. China (12 October)
7. Papua New Guinea (19 October)
8. India (Re:Releasing in 2010)
9. Togo/Benin (Re:Releasing in 2010)
10. Yemen (Re:Releasing in 2010)

=== Season 4 (2020 Madventures Suomi) ===
A ten-episode season, filmed in Finland and its in Finnish.

== Reception and awards ==
In 2002, the show received an Anti Animalia award for their MadCook section from Animalia, Finland's largest animal rights organization. Rantala and Milonoff strongly opposed Animalia's decision in public, calling it hypocritical and pusillanimous, as one of the story's points was to criticize western industrial farming. According to Madventures production team, they want to provoke and to create discussion about intolerance, neoconservatism and moralism.

In 2005, the second series was awarded with an Entertainment Special-Venla and two Media & Message awards in different categories. In 2008, Rantala was selected as the best male TV-person in the Kultainen TV (literally Golden TV) awards. In the same event Madventures won the best television programme of 2008 award. Both awards were decided in a vote by television viewers.

In January 2009, the hosts were selected as the Travel Persons of the Year by the Finnish Guild of Travel Journalists. The award, which has been given out since 1972, was presented in the Matka 2009 Nordic Travel Fair.

== Releases ==
DVD name	Ep #	Release dates
DVD name	Ep #	All regions
DVD name	Ep #	Full series
Madventures 1	12	23 November 2005
Madventures 2	13	28 September 2006
Madventures 3 (FI-version)	10	19 October 2009
Madventures 3 (EN-version)	10	6 October 2009

All the seasons have been released on DVD with extras. Series 2 box set includes subtitles in English. Series 3 has two separate DVD boxes for English and Finnish viewers. Both boxes include over four hours of unaired footage.

== See also ==
- Taboo, a similar show on the National Geographic Channel
- Departures, a backpacker adventure journal
