= Kim Herold =

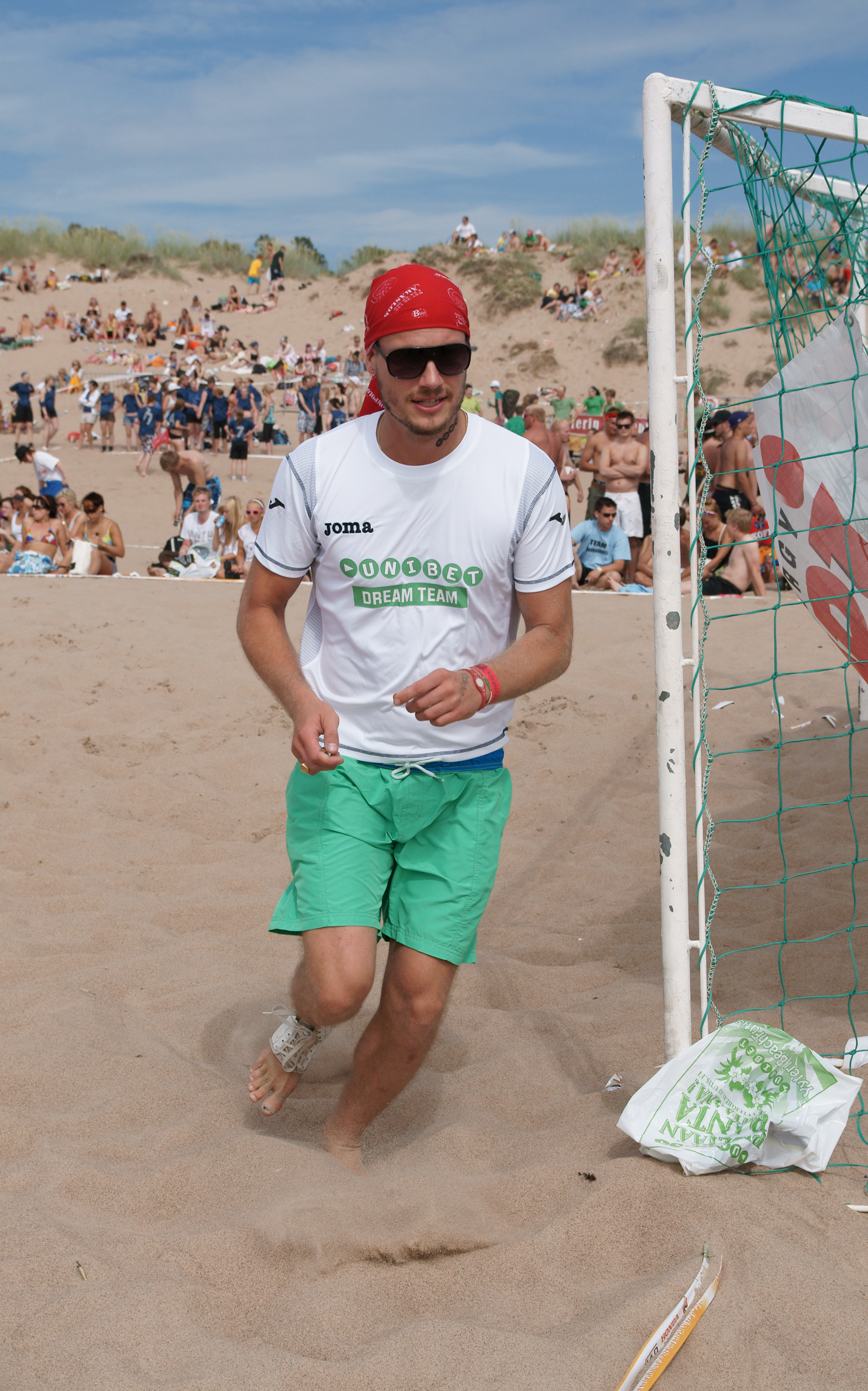
- Kim Herold playing beach soccer in 2010

Background information
- Born: Kim Mikael Herold; 22 December 1979 (age 46)
- Genres: Pop; rock
- Occupations: Singer-songwriter; model
- Labels: Universal; Lazenby
- Website: www.kimherold.net

Kim Mikael Herold (born 22 December 1979) is a Finland-Swedish model and singer-songwriter. He has been the lead singer of Finnish band Humane since 2004. He started solo career in 2008. In 2009 he participated in Tanssii tähtien kanssa, the Finnish version of Dancing with the Stars.

== Discography (solo) ==
=== Albums ===
- DrunkSoberLoveMusic (15 October 2008)
- Easy Love (5 October 2011)
- Kim Herold (21 November 2014)

=== Singles ===
- "Purple Skies" (Kim Herold & Tidjân) (16 April 2008 – Digital single / Promo Single)
- "Social Butterfly" (19 May 2008 – Digital single / Promo)
- "Love in a Bottle" (17 September 2008 – Digital single / Promo)
- "Panic in the Kitchen" (8 December 2008 – Digital single / Promo)
- "Broken Hearts" (6 May 2009 – Digital single / Promo)
- "Before I Marry You" (28 March 2011 – Digital single / Promo)
- "Easy Love" (2011) (29 August 2011 – Digital single / Promo)
- "You Are the One" (2011)
- "Kaikki okei" (2014)
- "Hengitä" (2014) (Kim Herold featuring Tuomas Kauhanen) (2014)
- "Lähellä loppua" (2014)
- "35" (Kim Herold featuring Samu Haber) (2015)

=== Music videos ===
- "Social Butterfly" (2008)
- "Love in a Bottle" (2008)
- "Before I Marry You" (2011)
- "Easy Love" (2011)
- "You Are the One" (2011)
- "Kaikki okei" (2014)
- "Hengitä" (2014)
- "Lähellä loppua" (2014)
