= Kolari =

- Municipality
- Kolarin kunta Kolari kommun
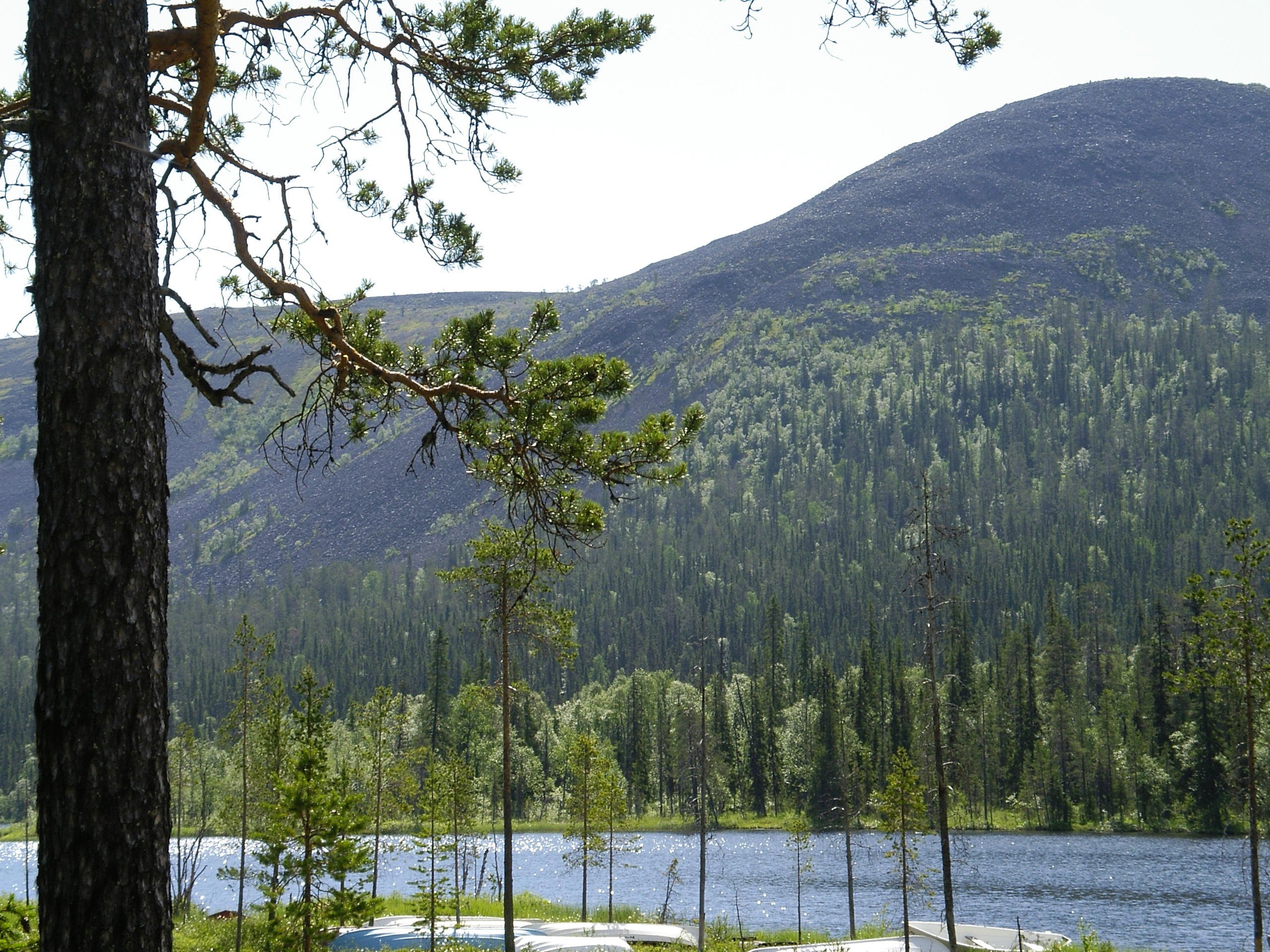
- Lake Kesänki at Ylläs

- Coat of arms

- Location of Kolari in Finland
- Interactive map of Kolari
- Coordinates: 67°19′50″N 023°46′40″E
- Country: Finland
- Region: Lapland
- Sub-region: Fell Lapland
- Charter: 1867

Government
  - Municipal manager: Heikki Havanka

Area (2018-01-01)
  - Total: 2,617.87 km^{2} (1,010.77 sq mi)
  - Land: 2,559.29 km^{2} (988.15 sq mi)
  - Water: 59.15 km^{2} (22.84 sq mi)
  - Rank: 21st largest in Finland

Population (2025-12-31)
  - Total: 4,001
  - Rank: 191st largest in Finland
  - Density: 1.56/km^{2} (4.0/sq mi)

Population by native language
  - Finnish: 96.2% (official)
  - Swedish: 0.7%
  - Others: 3.1%

Population by age
  - 0 to 14: 15.2%
  - 15 to 64: 57.6%
  - 65 or older: 27.1%
- Time zone: UTC+02:00 (EET)
  - Summer (DST): UTC+03:00 (EEST)
- Website: www.kolari.fi

Kolari is a municipality of Finland at the Swedish border, which follows the Torne River, the longest free-flowing river in Europe.

It is located in the region of Lapland. The municipality has a population of 4,001 (31 December 2025) and covers an area of 2,617.87 square kilometres (1,010.77 sq mi) of which 59.15 km^{2} (22.84 sq mi) is water. The population density is 1.56 inhabitants per square kilometre (4.0/sq mi).

Neighbouring municipalities are Muonio, Pello, Kittilä, Rovaniemi in Finland and Pajala Municipality in Sweden.

The municipality is unilingually Finnish.

Kolari railway station is the northernmost station in Finland.

Ylläs, one of the most popular ski resorts in Finland, is located in Kolari. The area also features the country's largest bog with a thousand-year-old forest.

== History ==
The first permanent settler in the area was a Savonian named Pekka Kolari, arriving in the area in the early 1580s. He originated from Konnevesi, which was a part of the Rautalampi parish at the time. The island named Kolarinsaari near the village of Istunmäki was likely his original home, as the Savonian surname Kolari originates from the same island.

The area of Kolari was a part of the Pajala parish, which is in modern Sweden. Kolari started growing in the 17th century due to the nearby Kengis (Köngäs) ironworks established in 1644. Kolari was home to many skilled blacksmiths. Charcoal, tar and chalk were produced and delivered to Tornio.

After Russia gained Finland in 1809, it was transferred to the Turtola parish, modern Pello. As the winter market could no longer be held in Kengis due to the new border, they were held on the island of Kolarinsaari in the Tornio river. Kolari became a chapel community in 1856 and a separate parish in 1894.

== See also ==
- Äkäslompolo
- Levi, Finland
