= Selviytyjät Suomi season 5 =

Selviytyjät Suomi
- Season 5
- Presented by: Juuso Mäkilähde
- No. of days: 33
- No. of castaways: 16
- Winner: Kristian Heiskari
- Runner-up: Marianne Kiukkonen
- Location: Haparanda, Sweden
- No. of episodes: 15

Release
- Original network: Nelonen
- Original release: 27 February – 5 June 2021

Season chronology
- ← Previous; Season 4 Next → Season 6

Selviytyjät Suomi season 5 is the fifth season of the Finnish reality show Selviytyjät Suomi based on the Swedish reality series Expedition Robinson. Due to the COVID-19 pandemic, the season was filmed in the forests of Haparanda, Sweden where 16 celebrities competed to win €30,000. The season premiered on 27 February 2021 and concluded 5 June 2021 when Big Brother winner Kristian Heiskari won against Former Police Officer & Coach, Marianne Kiukkonen in a 6-3 jury vote. (Note: For winning the final challenge, Kristian got to choose one of the jury members to vote twice, he chose to give the double votes to Archie.)

== Finishing order ==
Contestant	Original tribe	Swapped tribe	Merged tribe	Finish
Oskari Katajisto; 54, Actor	Aasat			1st Voted Out; Day 3
Johanna Pakonen; 44, Singer	Aasat			2nd Voted Out; Day 5
Aki Manninen; 44, Wellness Coach	Vaanit			3rd Voted Out; Day 7
Juuso "Herbalisti" Karikuusi; 26, Youtuber	Vaanit	Aasat		4th Voted Out; Day 10
Arttu Harkki; 54, Radio & TV Presenter	Aasat	Vaanit		5th Voted Out; Day 12
Sabina Särkkä; 31, Model	Vaanit	Vaanit		6th Voted Out; Day 14
Kerttu Rissanen; 24, Actress	Vaanit	Aasat	Valland	7th Voted Out; 1st Jury Member; Day 18
Elias Gould; 28, Musician & Actor	Aasat	Aasat	Valland	8th Voted Out; 2nd Jury Member; Day 21
Sara Vanninen; 30, Blogger	Aasat	Vaanit	Valland	9th Voted Out; 3rd Jury Member; Day 23
Karoliina Tuominen; 26, Radio Presenter	Aasat	Aasat	Valland	10th Voted Out; 4th Jury Member; Day 25
Niko Saarinen; 33, Reality TV Personality	Aasat	Vaanit	Valland	11th Voted Out; 5th Jury Member; Day 27
Archie Cruz; 28, Rock Singer	Vaanit	Vaanit	Valland	12th Voted Out; 6th Jury Member; Day 29
Suvi Pitkänen; 33, DJ	Vaanit	Vaanit	Valland	13th Voted Out; 7th Jury Member; Day 31
Joalin Loukamaa; 19, Dancer	Aasat	Aasat	Valland	Lost Challenge; 8th Jury Member; Day 33
Marianne Kiukkonen; 52, Coach & Former Police Officer	Vaanit	Vaanit	Valland	Runner-Up; Day 33
Kristian Heiskari; 28, Big Brother Winner	Vaanit	Aasat	Valland	Sole Survivor; Day 33

== Externtal links ==
- Official website
