= Riku Rantala =

Finnish journalist (born 1974)

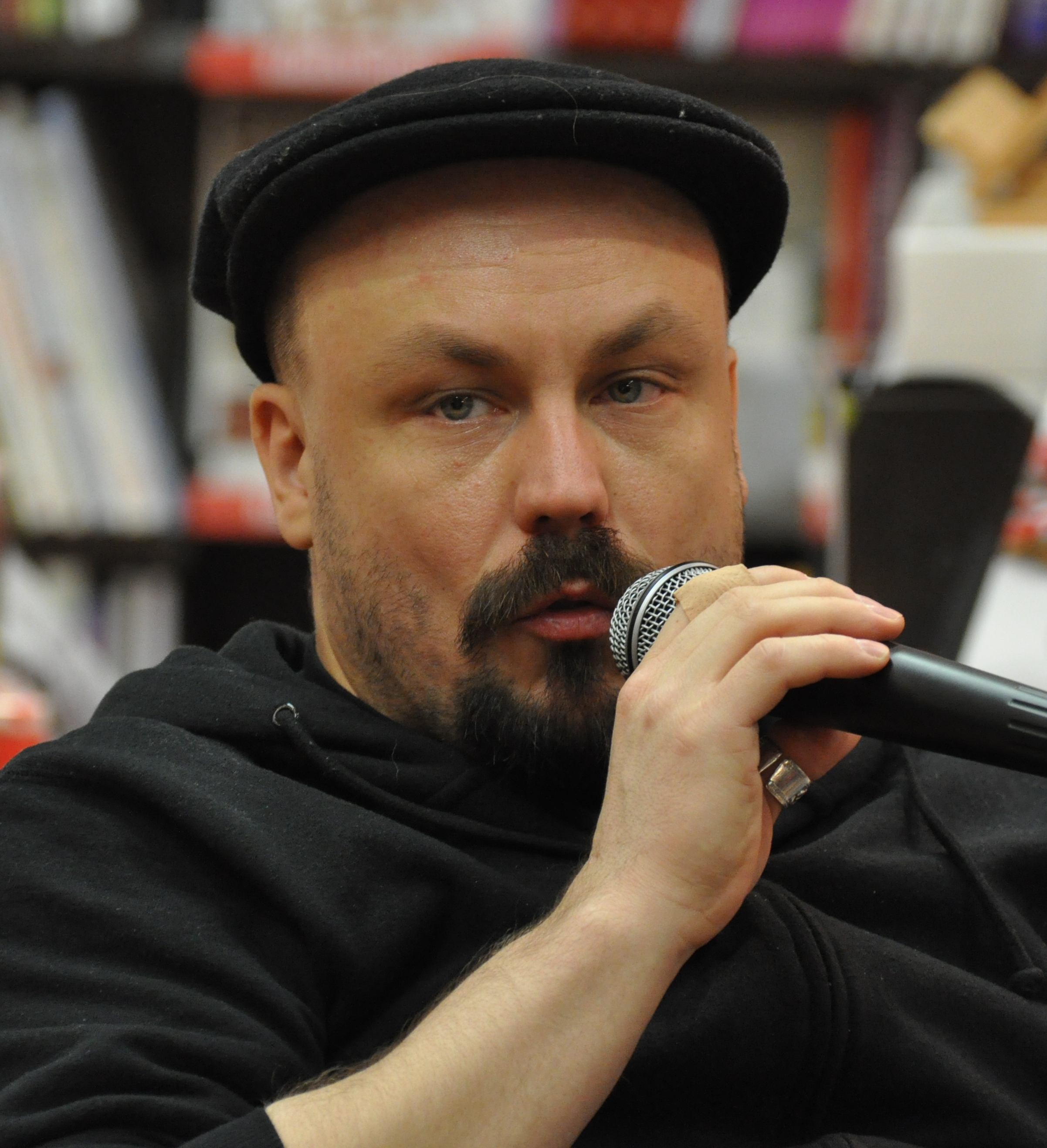
- Riku Rantala in 2010
- Born: Riku Rantala; 20 July 1974 (age 51); Hamina, Finland
- Occupations: actor, producer, journalist, presenter

Riku Rantala (born 20 July 1974) is a Finnish journalist, best known from traveling series Madventures. He has also co-written a book, Isänmaan asialla – matkaopas syrjäytettyjen Suomeen (Johnny Kniga, 2004), with Ari Lahdenmäki.

In 2007, Rantala, Lahdenmäki, and Tuomas "Tunna" Milonoff, the second of Madventures's presenters, published Madventures: Kansainvälisen seikkailijan opas (Johnny Kniga, 2007). The guide book provides advice and insight into the world of backpacking for new travelers.

Rantala has studied journalism in the University of Tampere.

== Awards ==
In 2010, Riku Rantala was selected as the best male television personality in the Kultainen TV (literally Golden TV) awards. In the same event, Madventures won the award for best television program. Both awards were decided in a vote by viewers.

In 2012, the Ministry of Education and Culture of Finland awarded Rantala and Milonoff for advancing geographical and global knowledge, especially among national youth.
