= Suomen Robinson 2005 =

- Season 2
- Presented by: Arttu Harkki
- No. of days: 50
- No. of castaways: 18
- Winner: Mira Jantunen
- Runner-up: Markku Markkanen
- Location: Malaysia

Release
- Original network: Nelonen
- Original release: 18 September – 12 December 2005

Additional information
- Filming dates: May – June 2005

Season chronology
- ← Previous; Suomen Robinson 2004

Suomen Robinson 2005 was the second season of the Finnish version of Expedition Robinson—or Survivor, as it is referred to in some countries—and premiered on September 18, 2005, and concluded December 12, 2005. Immediately upon arriving to the island the contestants were forced to compete in two challenges in order to determine who would be eliminated. The two contestants, Elena Sinkevitch and Mari Jalonen, were both sent to a secret island. As a major twist this season, during the pre-merge portion of the game when a contestant was voted out they would move to a secret island where they would compete against two other contestants to remain in the game. The two contestants left on the secret island following the final duel, Elena Sinkevitch and Markku Markkanen, joined the other members of the merge tribe. The contestants were then divided up into two tribes known as "Goal" and "Texas". When it came time for the final four, the contestants took part in the infamous "plank" competition in which Jasna Preselj was eliminated and Markku Markkanen advanced to the final two. The other two contestants then took part in one more challenge in which Mira Jantunen won and advanced to the final two while Elena Sinkevitch was eliminated. The final two then took part in a duel which Mira Jantunen won and earned an extra jury vote for herself. Along with this, Mira also won the audience's jury vote. Ultimately, it was Mira Jantunen who won this season over Markku Markkanen by a unanimous jury vote of 11–0 to win €40,000.

== Finishing order ==
Contestant	Original Tribes	Merged Tribe	Finish
Elena Sinkevitch; Returned to game	Texas		Lost Challenge; Day 1
Mari Jalonen; 28, Vantaa	Goal		Left Cage; Day 1 Lost Duel; Day ?
Markku Markkanen; Returned to game	Texas		1st Voted Out; Day 3
Akki Paunila; 23, Helsinki	Goal		2nd Voted Out; Day 6 Lost Duel; Day ?
Susanna Nurmi; 20, Kerava	Goal		3rd Voted Out; Day 9 Lost Duel; Day ?
Tom Krakau; 34, Helsinki	Texas		4th Voted Out; Day 12; Lost Duel; Day ?
Eija Koistinen; 20, Turku	Goal		5th Voted Out; Day 15; Lost Duel; Day ?
Sarah Kivijärvi; 19, Helsinki	Texas	Tengah	6th Voted Out; Day 18
Juha Liesilinna; 45, Espoo	Goal	Tengah	7th Voted Out; Day 21
Jarno Linnavirta; 34, Lahti	Texas	Tengah	8th Voted Out; 1st Jury Member; Day 24
Sari Nordström; 41, Fiskars	Texas	Tengah	9th Voted Out; 2nd Jury Member; Day 27
Hilkka Koskenranta; 28, Helsinki	Goal	Tengah	10th Voted Out; 3rd Jury Member; Day 30
Juuso Helokangas; 20, Vantaa	Goal	Tengah	Lost Duel; 4th Jury Member; Day 33
Marko Hulpio; 38, Helsinki	Texas	Tengah	11th Voted Out; 5th Jury Member; Day 36
Marko "Kossu" Koskenkorva; 40, Viinijärvi	Texas	Tengah	12th Voted Out; 6th Jury Member; Day 39
Jason Lepojärvi; 24, Helsinki	Goal	Tengah	13th Voted Out; 7th Jury Member; Day 42
Jasna Preselj; 23, Helsinki	Texas	Tengah	Lost Challenge; 8th Jury Member; Day 45
Elena Sinkevitch; 46, Helsinki	Texas	Tengah	Won Duel; Day ? Lost Challenge; 9th Jury Member; Day 48
Markku Markkanen; 50, Nuorgam	Texas	Tengah	Won Duel; Day ? Runner-Up; Day 50
Mira Jantunen; 31, Nilsiä	Goal	Tengah	Sole Survivor; Day 50
