= Sami Helenius =

Finnish ice hockey player

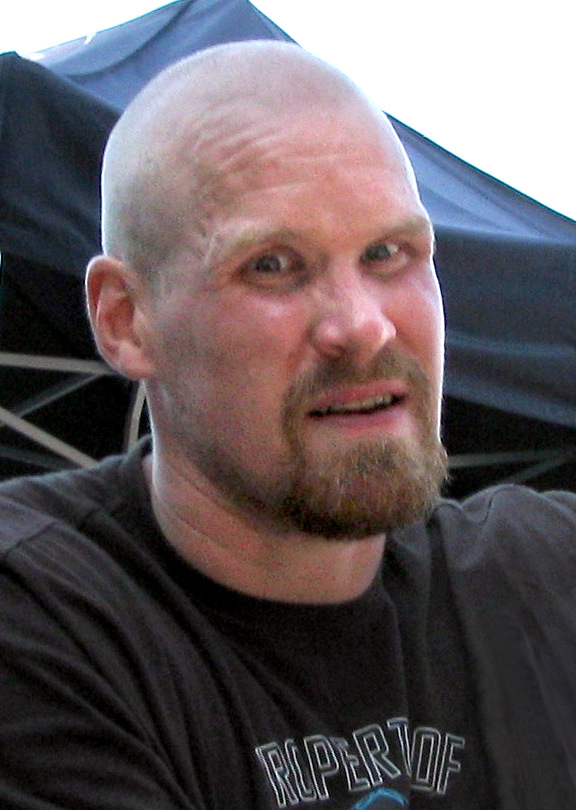
- Born: January 22, 1974 (age 52) Helsinki, Finland
- Height: 6 ft 6 in (198 cm)
- Weight: 230 lb (104 kg; 16 st 6 lb)
- Position: Defence
- Shot: Left
- Played for: Jokerit; Pelicans; Calgary Flames; Tampa Bay Lightning; Colorado Avalanche; Dallas Stars; Chicago Blackhawks; Ilves
- National team: Finland
- NHL draft: 102nd overall, 1992; Calgary Flames
- Playing career: 1992–2010

Sami "Helge" Helenius (born January 22, 1974) is a Finnish former professional ice hockey defenceman who played predominantly in the SM-liiga and National Hockey League. He most recently was in a coaching role with Haukat of the Suomi-sarja.

== Playing career ==
Helenius was drafted by the Calgary Flames as their fifth-round pick, 102nd overall, in the 1992 NHL entry draft. He started his professional career in Jokerit in the Finnish SM-liiga in 1992, and made his way to North America for the 1994–95 season, and after spending five years mostly in the minor leagues, Helenius took his place as an NHL defenceman, playing for several teams. Helenius became known as "the Fighting Finn," as he was one of the few Europeans to play in an enforcer role in North American hockey leagues.

In 2003, he returned to Finland to play in the SM-liiga again. After a year with Jokerit where he served as team captain, Helenius represented both Ilves and Pelicans before returning to Jokerit after the 2006–07 season.

After three seasons with Jokerit and during the 2009–10 season, Helenius rejoined previous club Pelicans on November 13, 2009. After finishing the season out with Pelicans, Helenius agreed to join HC Keski-Uusimaa of the Suomi-sarja as a player-coach for the 2010–11 season on August 4, 2010, however only opted to coach upon the resumption of the season.

== Coaching career ==
In the summer of 2022, Helenius signed a 1+1 year contract with the Kouvola KooKoo.

"I look forward to new challenges at KooKoo! I’ve been watching the Liiga for a couple of years up close and I'm aware of the demands and currents of modern hockey, but I want to bring those good 'old school' elements to the game as well," Helenius said.

== Career statistics ==
=== Regular season and playoffs ===
			Regular season					Playoffs
Season	Team	League	GP	G	A	Pts	PIM	GP	G	A	Pts	PIM
1990–91	Jokerit	FIN U20	2	0	0	0	0	—	—	—	—	—
1991–92	Jokerit	FIN.2 U20	13	4	4	8	24	14	3	3	6	24
1992–93	Jokerit	FIN.2 U20	3	2	2	4	4	13	2	3	5	18
1992–93	Jokerit	SM-l	1	0	0	0	0	—	—	—	—	—
1992–93	Vantaa HT	FIN.2	21	2	3	5	50	—	—	—	—	—
1993–94	Reipas Lahti	FIN.2 U20	1	1	0	1	2	11	3	4	7	48
1993–94	Reipas Lahti	SM-l	37	2	3	5	46	—	—	—	—	—
1994–95	Saint John Flames	AHL	69	2	5	7	217	—	—	—	—	—
1995–96	Saint John Flames	AHL	68	0	3	3	231	10	0	0	0	9
1996–97	Saint John Flames	AHL	72	5	10	15	218	2	0	0	0	0
1996–97	Calgary Flames	NHL	3	0	1	1	0	—	—	—	—	—
1997–98	Saint John Flames	AHL	63	1	2	3	185	—	—	—	—	—
1997–98	Las Vegas Thunder	IHL	10	0	1	1	19	4	0	0	0	25
1998–99	Las Vegas Thunder	IHL	42	2	3	5	193	—	—	—	—	—
1998–99	Calgary Flames	NHL	4	0	0	0	8	—	—	—	—	—
1998–99	Chicago Wolves	IHL	4	0	0	0	11	—	—	—	—	—
1998–99	Tampa Bay Lightning	NHL	4	1	0	1	15	—	—	—	—	—
1998–99	Hershey Bears	AHL	8	0	0	0	29	5	0	0	0	16
1999–2000	Hershey Bears	AHL	12	0	1	1	31	9	0	0	0	40
1999–2000	Colorado Avalanche	NHL	33	0	0	0	46	—	—	—	—	—
2000–01	Dallas Stars	NHL	57	1	2	3	99	1	0	0	0	0
2001–02	Dallas Stars	NHL	39	0	0	0	58	—	—	—	—	—
2002–03	Dallas Stars	NHL	5	0	0	0	6	—	—	—	—	—
2002–03	Utah Grizzlies	AHL	4	0	0	0	14	—	—	—	—	—
2002–03	Chicago Blackhawks	NHL	10	0	1	1	28	—	—	—	—	—
2003–04	Jokerit	SM-l	55	0	1	1	103	—	—	—	—	—
2004–05	Ilves	SM-l	53	0	0	0	162	7	0	2	2	4
2005–06	Pelicans	SM-l	53	1	3	4	151	—	—	—	—	—
2006–07	Pelicans	SM-l	53	1	0	1	126	6	0	0	0	2
2007–08	Jokerit	SM-l	49	1	6	7	198	13	0	0	0	29
2008–09	Jokerit	SM-l	45	0	0	0	76	2	0	0	0	2
2009–10	Jokerit	SM-l	14	0	0	0	20	—	—	—	—	—
2009–10	Pelicans	SM-l	34	0	2	2	170	—	—	—	—	—
SM-l totals			394	5	15	20	1052	28	0	2	2	37
AHL totals			296	8	21	29	925	26	0	0	0	65
NHL totals			155	2	4	6	260	1	0	0	0	0

=== International ===
Year	Team	Event	Result	GP	G	A	Pts	PIM
1992	Finland	EJC	4th	6	0	0	0	22
1993	Finland	WJC	5th	7	0	1	1	6
2003	Finland	WC	5th	2	0	0	0	0
Junior totals				13	0	1	1	28
Senior totals				2	0	0	0	0
