= Treasure of Rethel =

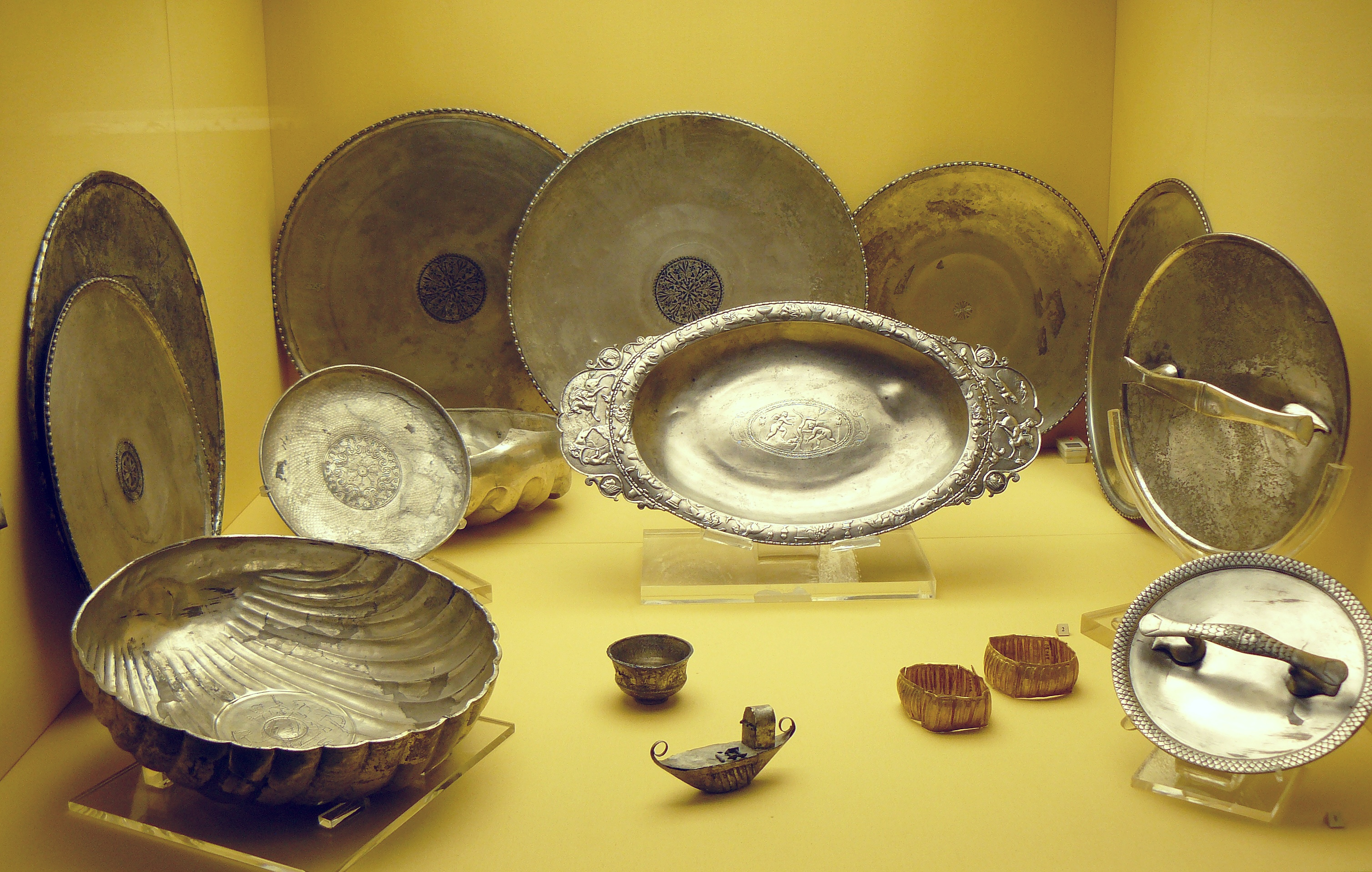
The 16 items from the treasure

The Treasure of Rethel is a collection of Gallo-Roman silver and gold items discovered by chance in Rethel in Ardennes, France. It is now kept at the National Archaeological Museum of Saint-Germain-en-Laye.

On October 5, 1980, the treasure was discovered in a field at Moulinet, in the town of Rethel. The treasure was found in badly deteriorated bronze container. Traces of cloth showed that the items had been wrapped. Like other deposits in the north-east of Gaul the goods were probably saved by a wealthy person afraid of the Germanic incursions around 270 to 280 AD.

The treasure consists of 16 pieces of silver and gold with a total weight of 16 kg. They include tableware, two mirrors with ornate handles, two large shells intended for ablutions, a large oval dish decorated with a hunting scene, a goblet and two gold bracelets. The National Archaeological Museum of Saint-Germain-en-Laye acquired the treasure in 1985.

== See also ==
- Seuso Treasure
- Mildenhall Treasure
