= Missorium of Theodosius I =

Large ceremonial silver dish

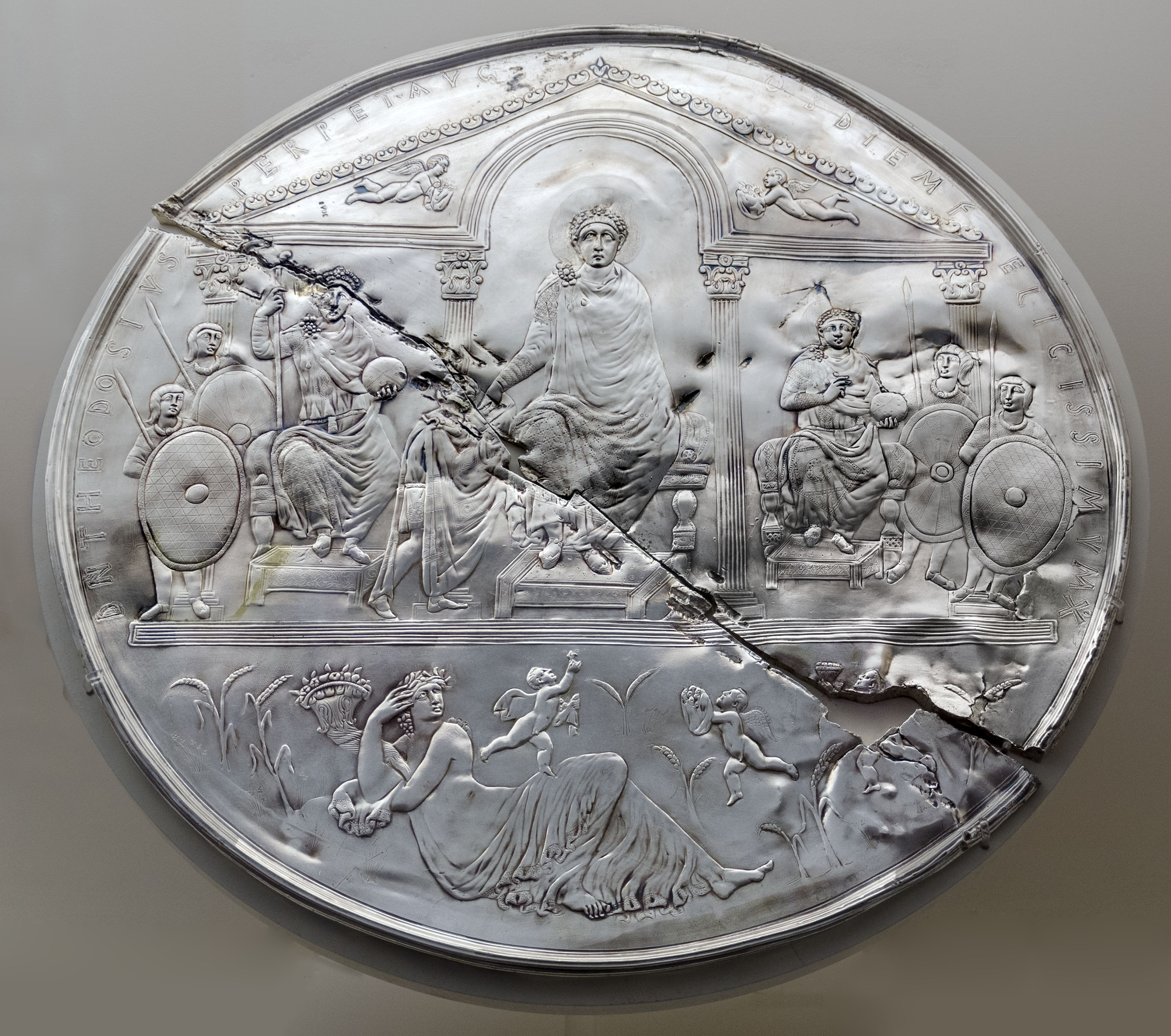
- A copy of the Missorium of Theodosius on display in National Museum of Roman Art, Mérida
- Type: Ceremonial dish
- Material: Silver
- Discovered: 1847; Almendralejo, Extremadura, Spain
- Present location: Royal Academy of History, Madrid, Spain
- Culture: Late Roman

The Missorium of Theodosius I is a large ceremonial silver dish preserved in the Real Academia de la Historia, in Madrid, Spain. It was probably made in Constantinople for the tenth anniversary (decennalia) in 388 AD of the reign of the Emperor Theodosius I, the last Emperor to rule both the Eastern and Western Empires. It is one of the best surviving examples of Late Antique Imperial imagery and one of the finest examples of late Roman goldsmith work. It is the largest and most elaborate, and the most famous, of the 19 surviving vessels believed to represent largitio ("largesse") or a "ceremonial gift given by the emperor to a civil or military official".

== Iconography ==
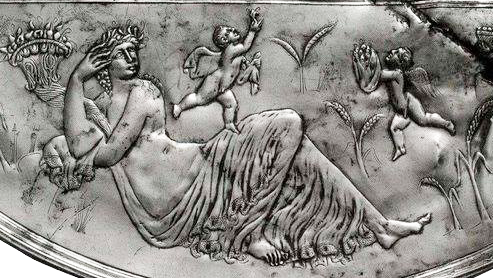
Reclining Terra, the Roman goddess of Mother Earth.

The dish shows a hieratic image of the Emperor framed in an arcade, giving a document contained in a diptych, possibly a letter of appointment, to a much smaller senior official, flanked by his two co-emperors, Valentinian II and his own son Arcadius, and bodyguards who can be identified by their hairstyles, torcs and shields as belonging to the German imperial bodyguard. The official receives the document with hands covered by his chlamys (cloak).

Theodosius is shown far larger than the other figures, as is common in the hieratic Late Antique style, despite the fact that Valentinian II had been an Emperor for longer (he in turn is significantly larger than Arcadius or the unknown official). The three emperors have haloes which is usual at this period.

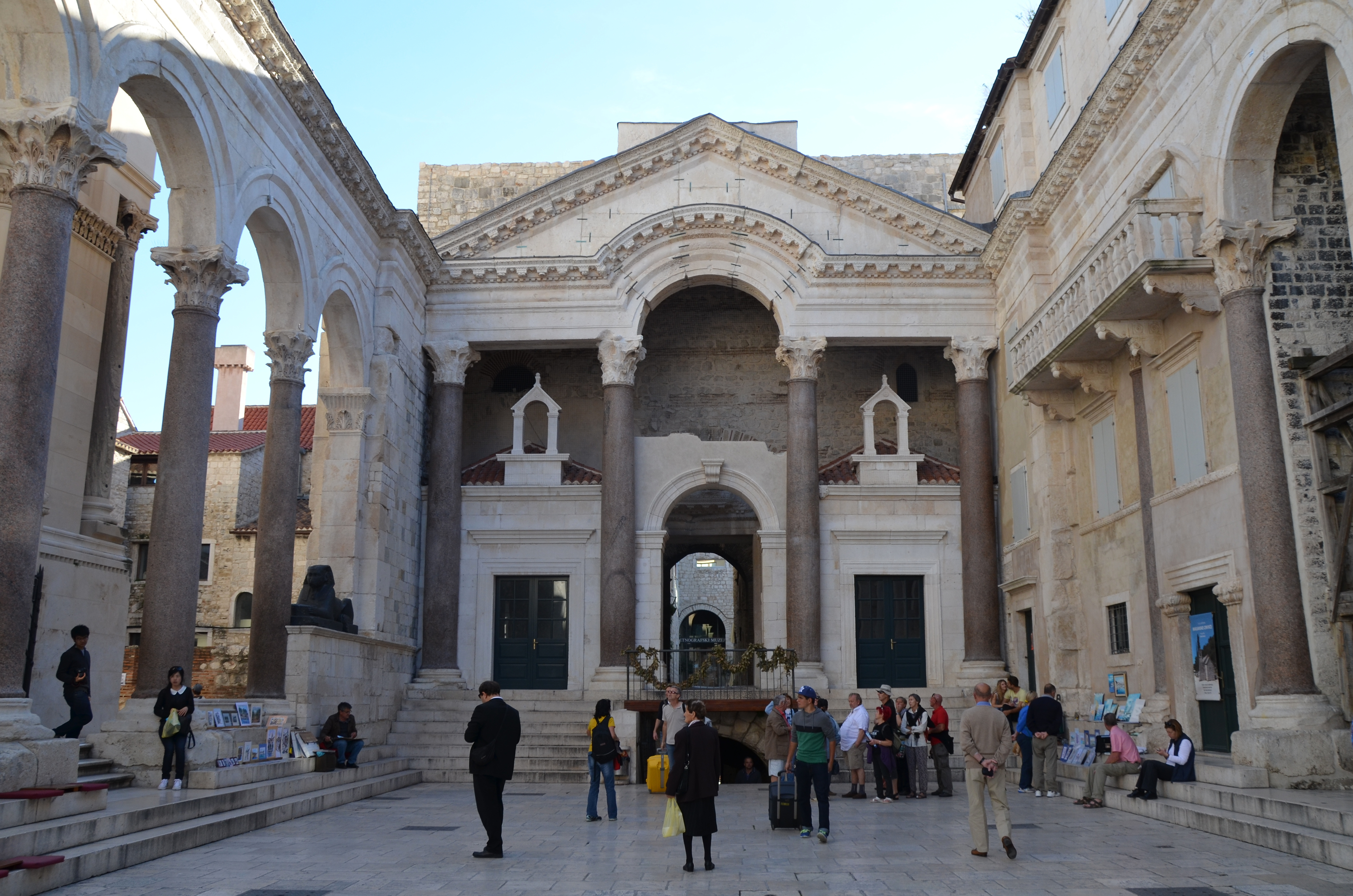
The peristyle in Diocletian's Palace, in modern-day Croatia.

Their clothing is early Byzantine dress consistent with other Imperial portraits of the period. The two co-emperors have decorated tablions (patches showing rank attached to their main garment) at their knees, or possibly Epigonations (unattached ceremonial "handkerchiefs", which survive as an Eastern Orthodox vestment). These would have been highly decorated with embroidery and probably jewels.

The official receiving the document wears clothes decorated with stripes and patches which would have been a kind of uniform for his office. The three Imperial figures have tightly curled hairstyles, and wear diadems of pearls. Their cloaks are fastened with large circular jewelled fibulae, comparable to that worn by Justinian in the mosaic at San Vitale, Ravenna, while the official has a "crossbow" fibula.

The architectural surround has often been compared to a peristyle at Diocletian's Palace in Split, Croatia, where the emperor retired after abdicating his powers. This opens from the imperial residence to a courtyard that has been regarded as a setting for ceremonial audiences such as the one shown on the dish, but this interpretation is uncertain.

Below the groundline of the imperial scene there is a scene of putti offering garlands and other objects, up to the Emperor above; with the two on the pediment above, there are five in total, and various significances have been given to this number, as representing years, "dioceses" of the Eastern Empire, or other things. Their offerings are held in hand-cloths, just as the official uses his clothes to receive his gift; it was considered disrespectful to hold bare hands out to the emperor.

The putti fly above a reclining figure of Tellus or Terra, the Roman earth goddess. Vaguer figures from Roman mythology such as personifications, putti, and winged victories continued to be acceptable in Christian art of the Roman elite, and apparently retained for reasons of what we might call "cultural heritage", where representations of specific major deities were not. Tellus is shown in a pose that continues Hellenistic style, rather than the frontal iconic Late Antique style of the figures in the upper zone. Any Christian imagery is noticeably absent.

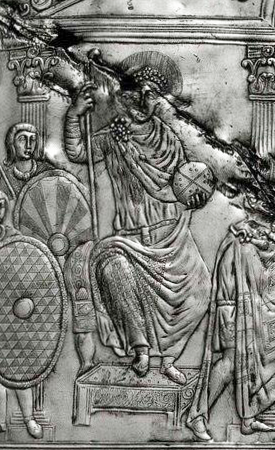
Detail of Valentinian II.

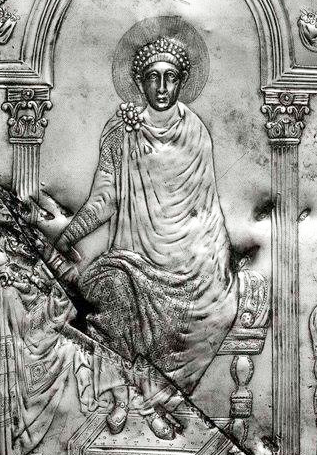
Detail of Theodosius I.

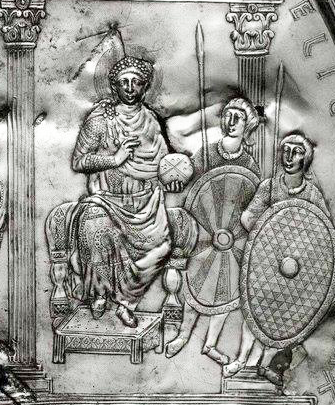
Detail of Arcadius.

== Discovery and condition ==
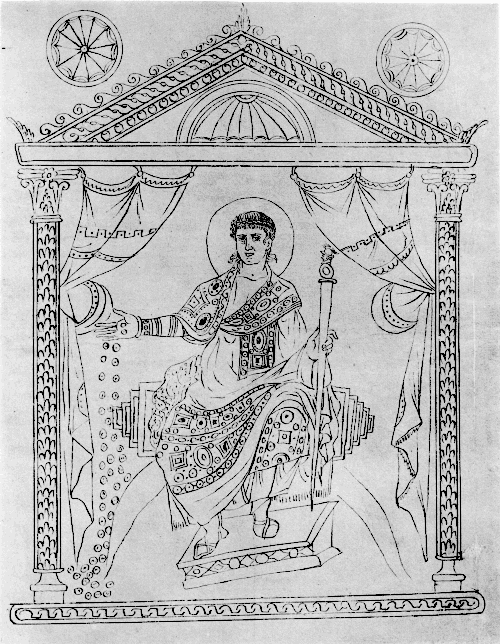
A haloed Constantius II dispensing largitia (generosity) as if by magic, from the Chronography of 354.

The missorium comes from a treasure of silver objects that also included two plain silver cups, now missing, discovered by a labourer in 1847 in Almendralejo, close to Mérida in the Spanish province of Badajoz. When found it was folded flat along the line of the diagonal cut that now divides it into two pieces, which was made as part of an attempt to restore it, though an attempt at a cut along the same line may also have been made in antiquity. It is in good condition apart from the areas affected by this, but that it was folded may suggest it was being treated as bullion when deposited. The height of the silver relief varies, and is highest in the face of Theodosius and other highlights of the composition; much of the detail on the clothing is engraved.

== A commemorative dish ==
The dish is an examples of silversmith's work of imperial largesse, that is to say of the category of luxury articles made for imperial celebrations such as accession to the throne and anniversaries and given on these occasions by the emperor to high-ranking dignitaries of the empire: they were mainly dishes, plates, cups, and bowls in silver. The recipient may well be the official represented on the dish (possibly a generalized figure, especially if the design was made in several copies, which we cannot judge), and the find-spot in Spain, Theodosius's home province, suggests it was one of his Spanish friends or relations.

A missorium is a large dish or shallow bowl that could be used in ceremonial washing of hands and face in both secular and pagan and Christian religious contexts, though this dish is too flat to be very useful for this, and was probably intended mainly to be displayed as a sign of wealth and imperial favour. The term now tends to be avoided by scholars, as rather imprecise, but has become traditional in the case of the dish in Madrid. This is made of solid silver and has traces of gilding on the inscriptions. Its size is exceptional compared to other contemporary silver dishes, measuring 74 cm in diameter with a thickness which varies between 4 and 8 mm. It rests on a ring, 3 cm thick with a diameter of 26 cm, which was welded to the base. This ring has a Greek inscription specifying the official weight of the object: ποc ↑Ν ΜεΤ, i.e. ποσότης λιτρῶν 50 μετάλλου (“50 metal pounds”)

The 50 "pounds" correspond to an official weight of 16.13 kg of silver, whereas the dish actually weighs only 15.35 kg; the difference could be because the dish was weighed and marked before being decorated: a piece of the dish is also missing. The decoration, at the same time engraved and with repoussé decoration (pushed out from the back), would have removed a little metal, although this is unlikely to account for the whole difference.

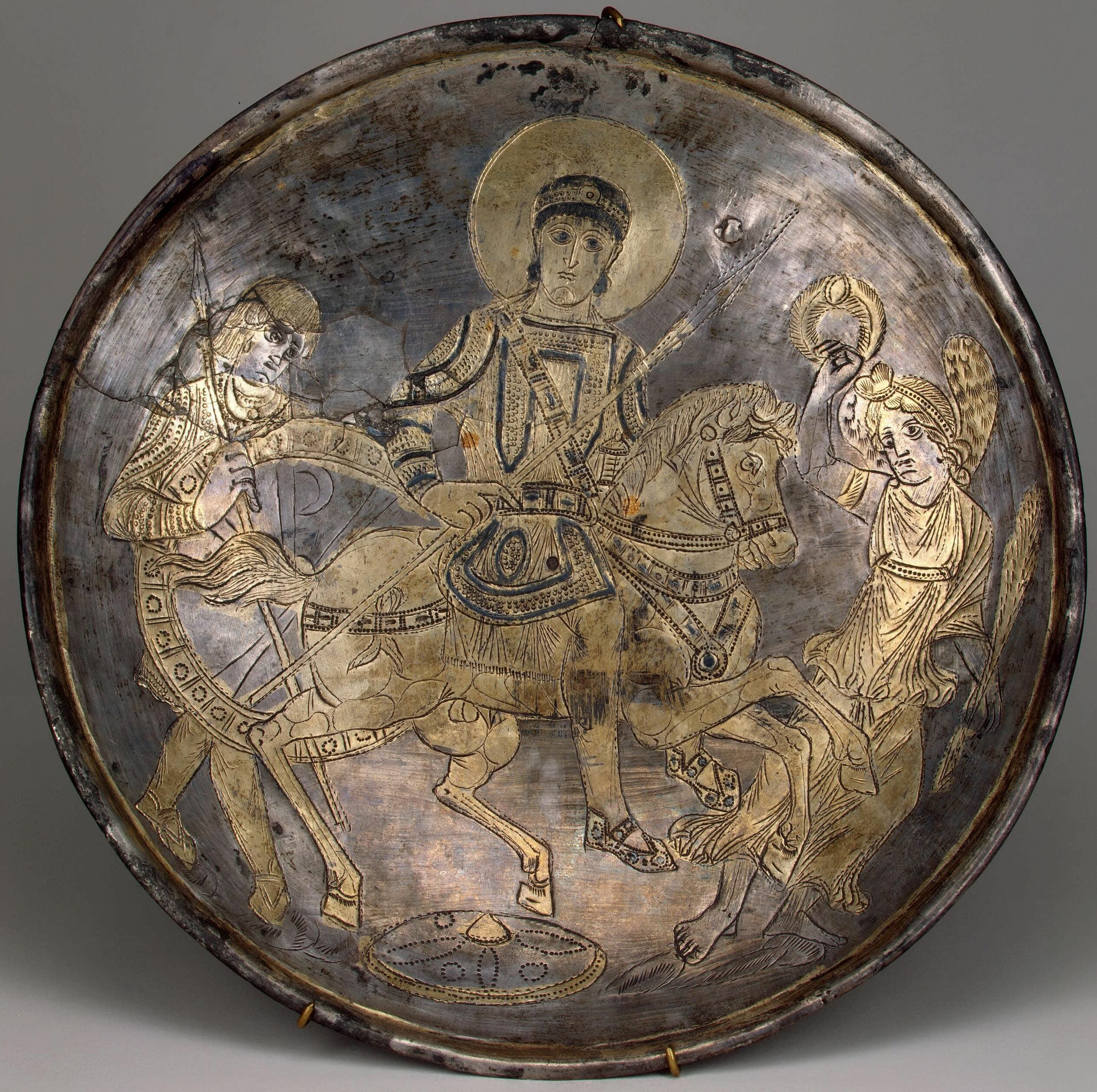
The Missorium of Kerch representing Constantius II, Hermitage Museum, St Petersburg.

The subject of the decoration is the emperor enthroned with his co-reigning emperors. An inscription along the side of the rim makes it possible to identify him with certainty: d(ominus) n(oster) theodosivs perpet(uus) avg(ustus)ob diem felicissimvm X; “Our Lord Theodosius, emperor forever, on the most happy occasion of the tenth anniversary (of his reign).”

The inscription indicates that the dish was made at the time of the decennalia of an emperor named Theodosius. The presence of two co-regents makes it possible to exclude immediately Theodosius II, for he had one co-regent — his uncle Flavius Honorius — at the time of the tenth anniversary of his reign, celebrated in 412. This leaves the decennalia of Theodosius I, on January 19 388. It was celebrated when the emperor was staying at Thessaloniki from September 387 to April 388. Some have concluded that the missorium was the work of a Thessalonician workshop, but it is more likely that it was ordered from the Imperial workshops in Constantinople; others think that the imperial workshop would have followed the emperor around on his travels.

Few examples of this imperial silver have survived; only nineteen items, all dating from the 4th century and produced for six different emperors, though ten are for Licinius. In this series, the missorium of Theodosius I is distinguished because it is both the latest - although the practice probably continued for a further two centuries - and because it carries the most elaborate decoration: the only other well-preserved examples are the Kerch plate, preserved at the Hermitage Museum in St Petersburg, showing Constantius II on horseback, and that of Valentinian I or Valentinian II in Geneva. A fragment from a treasure found at Groß Bodungen was probably the closest to the missorium of Theodosius I in design, but is too damaged to allow an identification or a precise dating. Rather more examples have survived of aristocratic, rather than imperial silver, such as the Mildenhall Treasure probably dating from a few years earlier, or the Sevso Treasure.

Jutta Meischner relocates the Missorium of Theodosius to the 5th century AD, to the year 421. She argues, that the emperor is Theodosius II, flanked by Honorius to the right and Valentinian III to the left. Meischner constitutes this interpretation by describing the Missorium as a work of distinctive style, quality of execution and workmanship seen in exemplary examples of Western Roman Empire. She argues that features like these are not consistent with the era of Theodosius I.

Arne Effenberger has argued against this interpretation, stating that Theodosius II became autocrat in the year 408 AD, so his 10th reign anniversary would have taken place in 418 and not in 421 AD. He believes that it is thus unlikely that anniversary specified in the inscription may date to the reign of Theodosius II.

However, Meischner bases her argument on the inscription mentioning a tenth imperial anniversary was intended to celebrate the continuation of the dynasty ten years after coming to power Theodosius II in 418 AD, following his father Arcadius’ death in 408 AD. On the basis of the epigraphic evidence (a XV, as proposed by Alicia Canto, see above and below), she believes that it was most likely commissioned by Galla Placidia and produced in Ravenna in around 421 AD as a gift to her nephew Theodosius II. She concedes the reading of the Roman numerals inscribed on the missorium by Alicia Canto in her detailed study (that was presented in the same Madrid conference), as ‘quindecennalia’ the fifteenth imperial anniversary, as opposed to the common reading of decennalia, gives us of a new perspective and reassessment of the history, the circumstances of the Missorium's commission by Galla Placidia and its intended functions and unresolved provenance.

== Style ==
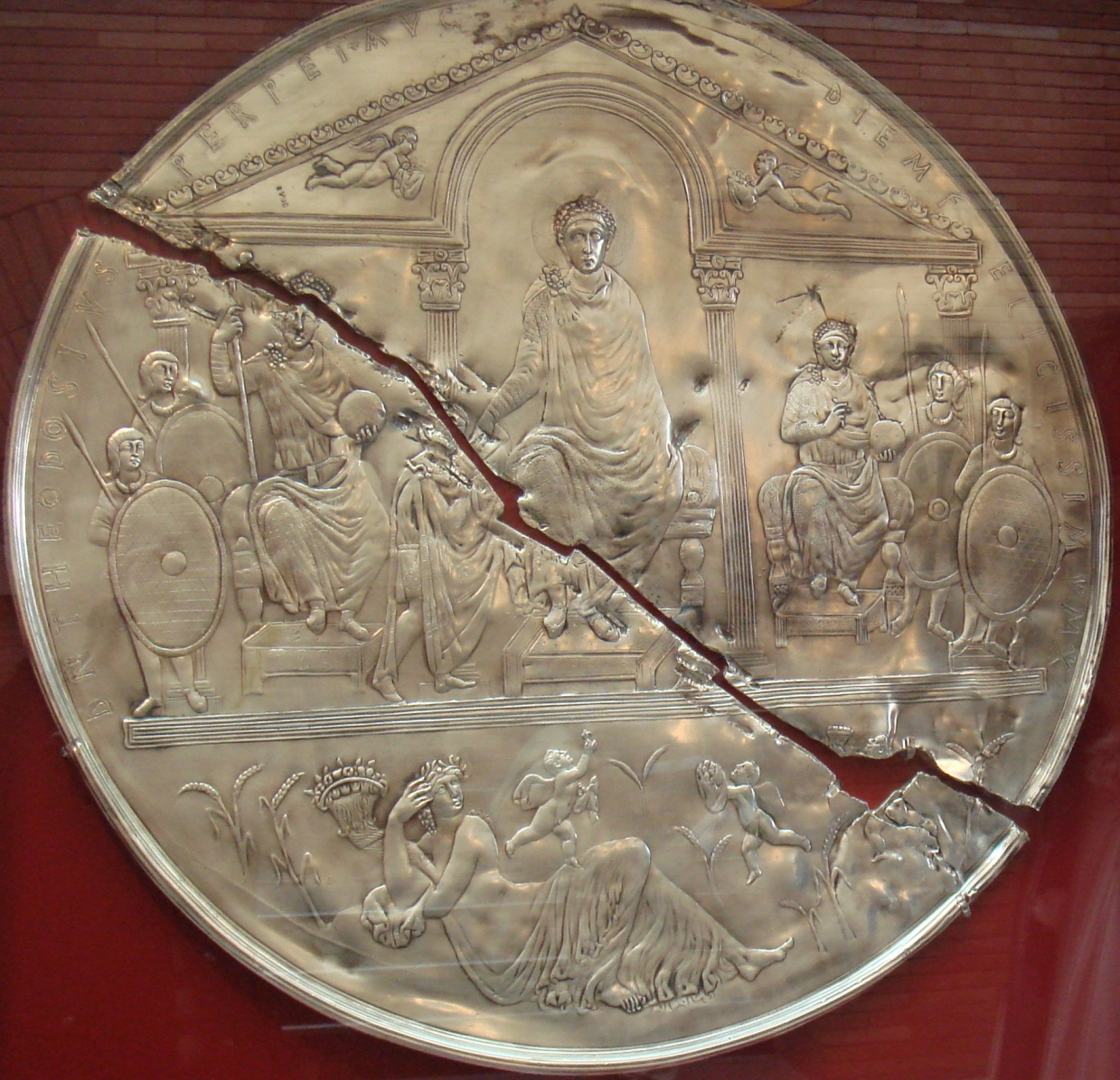
A copy of the Missorium of Theodosius in the Museum of Mérida, Spain.

The dish is a leading example of the style of the so-called "Theodosian Renaissance", along with the base of the Obelisk of Theodosius in Istanbul and the fragments surviving of his triumphal column there. This is the first stylistic phase that can be clearly linked with the new capital of Constantinople, and according to Ernst Kitzinger: "One senses that some strong artistic personality or personalities who set the tone and aesthetic standards were active at the centre of political power, stamping the monuments of this period with an unmistakable imprint".

Despite limitations in terms of anatomical correctness, and a "soft, rubbery quality" in the nude bodies, the style has "an element of studied classicism" as well as "an insistence on clear, continuous and simplified outline, on neatness and regularity" in the figure of Terra/Tellus, so that "Classicist form is oddly paired with linear abstract order", the latter more prominent in the upper zone, to lend an air of authority and "timelessness and absolute stability" to the imperial figures that was not required below.

== See also ==
- Chronography of 354
- Sevso Treasure
