= Survivor – A sziget season 1 =

Survivor – A sziget
- Season 1
- Presented by: András Stohl
- No. of days: 39
- No. of castaways: 16
- Winner: Tünde Molnár
- Runner-up: Norbi
- Location: Samaná, Dominican Republic
- No. of episodes: 14

Release
- Original network: RTL Klub
- Original release: September 20 – December 20, 2003

Season chronology
- Next → Season 2

Survivor – A sziget 1 was the first season of the Hungarian version of the reality television series Survivor which was broadcast on RTL Klub from September 20, 2003 to December 20, 2003 and filmed in Samaná, the Dominican Republic.

== Season summary ==
Although the show had the title Survivor, the tribe names of North and South reflected those traditionally used in Expedition Robinson. During the pre-merge portion of the program the South team proved dominant in both the reward and immunity challenge while the North team found themselves down to only four members by the time the merge arrived. In episode three an injured Kriszta was forced to leave the competition, leaving the North team with only five members, thus the recently voted out Laca returned to the competition to take her place. Despite the fact that the first tribal council vote following the merge had a predictable 6-4 voting result that sent home a former member of the North team, the next vote, and the three votes following it, saw the formation of a powerful five person alliance composed of Bubu, Csabám, Norbi, Szilárd, and Tünde, which would ultimately compose the final five. When it came time for the final four, the contestants competed in two challenges in which Csabám and Szilárd were eliminated while Norbi and Tünde advanced to the finals. Ultimately, it was Tünde Molnár who won this season over Norbi after having received more votes to win by the public.

== Finishing order ==
Contestant	Original Tribes	Merged Tribe	Finish
Anita Kovács; 22, Nyírkarász	North Team		1st Voted Out; Day 3
Laca; Returned to Game	North Team		2nd Voted Out; Day 6
Kriszta; 26, Budapest	North Team		Evacuated; Day 7
Titi; 30, Sződ	South Team		3rd Voted Out; Day 9
Joci; 42, Zugló	North Team		4th Voted Out; Day 12
András Badonics; 30	South Team		5th Voted Out; Day 15
Réka; 25	North Team		6th Voted Out; Day 18
Laca; 31	North Team	Merged Tribe	7th Voted Out; Day 21
Csaba "Süti" Sütő; 29, Újlipótváros	South Team	Merged Tribe	8th Voted Out; Day 24
Orsi; 29, Polgárdi	South Team	Merged Tribe	9th Voted Out; Day 27
Ferenc "Feri" Jánosi; 21, Pomáz	South Team	Merged Tribe	10th Voted Out; Day 30
Gabi; 24, Budapest	North Team	Merged Tribe	11th Voted Out; Day 33
Gabriella "Bubu" Lichner; 18	South Team	Merged Tribe	12th Voted Out; Day 36
Csabám Sütő; 24, Sopron	South Team	Merged Tribe	Lost Challenge; Day 37
Szilárd Tóth; 31, Győr	North Team	Merged Tribe	Lost Challenge; Day 38
Norbert "Norbi"; 29, Dunaújváros	North Team	Merged Tribe	Runner-Up; Day 39
Tünde Molnár; 28, Zalaegerszeg	South Team	Merged Tribe	Sole Survivor; Day 39

== The game ==
Air date	Challenges		Eliminated	Vote	Finish
Air date	Reward	Immunity	Eliminated	Vote	Finish
September 20, 2003	None	South Team	Anita	5-3	1st Voted Out; Day 3
September 27, 2003	South Team	South Team	Laca	6-1	2nd Voted Out; Day 6
October 4, 2003	None	None	Kriszta	No Vote	Evacuated; Day 7
October 4, 2003	North Team	North Team	Titi	7-1	3rd Voted Out; Day 9
October 11, 2003	South Team	South Team	Joci	3-3	4th Voted Out; Day 12
October 18, 2003	North Team	North Team	András	3-2-2	5th Voted Out; Day 15
October 25, 2003	South Team	South Team	Réka	3-2	6th Voted Out; Day 18
November 1, 2003	None	Süti	Laca	6-4	7th Voted Out; Day 21
November 8, 2003	None	Norbi	Süti	5-4	8th Voted Out; Day 24
November 15, 2003	Szilárd	Szilárd	Orsi	5-2-1	9th Voted Out; Day 27
November 22, 2003	Tünde, [Szilárd]	Szilárd	Feri	5-2	10th Voted Out; Day 30
November 29, 2003	Norbi	Bubu	Gabi	5-1	11th Voted Out; Day 33
December 6, 2003	Bubu	Norbi	Bubu	3-2	12th Voted Out; Day 36
December 13, 2003	None	Tünde	Csabám	No Vote	Lost Challenge; Day 37
December 13, 2003	None	Norbi	Szilárd	No Vote	Lost Challenge; Day 38
December 20, 2003	Public Vote		Norbi	?%-?%	Runner-Up
December 20, 2003	Public Vote		Tünde	?%-?%	Sole Survivor

In the case of multiple tribes or castaways who win reward or immunity, they are listed in order of finish, or alphabetically where it was a team effort; where one castaway won and invited others, the invitees are in brackets.

== Voting history ==
	Original Tribes							Merged Tribe									
Episode #:	1	2	3		4	5	6	7	8	9	10	11	12	13		Reunion	
Eliminated:	Anita; 5/8 votes	Laca; 6/7 votes	Kriszta; No vote	Titi; 7/8 votes	Joci; 3/6 votes^{1}	András; 3/7 votes	Réka; 3/5 votes	Laca; 6/10 votes	Süti; 5/9 votes	Orsi; 5/8 votes	Feri; 5/7 votes	Gabi; 5/6 votes	Bubu; 3/5 votes	Csabám; No vote	Szilárd; No vote	Norbi; Lost vote	Tünde; Won vote
Voter	Vote																
Tünde				Titi		Bubu		Laca	Süti	Orsi	Feri	Gabi	Bubu	Won		Sole Survivor	
Norbi	Kriszta	Laca			Réka		Réka	Feri	Süti	Orsi	Feri	Gabi	Bubu		Won	Runner-Up	
Szilárd	Kriszta	Laca			Joci		Réka	Feri	Süti	Orsi	Feri	Gabi	Bubu		Lost		
Csabám				Titi		András		Laca	Süti	Orsi	Feri	Gabi	Tünde	Lost			
Bubu				Titi		András		Laca	Süti	Orsi	Feri	Gabi	Tünde				
Gabi	Anita	Laca			Joci		Laca	Feri	Szilárd	Tünde	Csabám	Szilárd					
Feri				Titi		Bubu		Laca	Szilárd	Norbi	Csabám						
Orsi				Titi		András		Laca	Szilárd	Norbi							
Süti				Titi		Csabám		Laca	Szilárd								
Laca	Anita	Kriszta			Réka		Réka	Feri									
Réka	Anita	Laca			Joci		Laca										
András				Titi		Csabám											
Joci	Anita	Laca			Réka												
Titi				Tünde													
Kriszta	Anita	Laca															
Anita	Kriszta																

=== Notes ===
^1 At the fourth tribal council both Joci and Réka received three votes. Because of this, both were forced to draw lots to determine who would be eliminated.
