= Survivor – A sziget season 2 =

Survivor – A sziget
- Season 2
- Presented by: András Stohl
- No. of days: 38
- No. of castaways: 16
- Winner: Dávid Hankó
- Runner-up: Anna Pásztor
- Location: Caribbean
- No. of episodes: 13

Release
- Original network: RTL Klub
- Original release: August 25 – December 3, 2004

Season chronology
- ← Previous; Season 1 Next → Season 3

Survivor A-Sziget 2 was the second season of the Hungarian version of Survivor which was broadcast on RTL Klub from August 25, 2004 to December 3, 2004.

== Season summary ==
Although the show had the title Survivor, the tribe names of North and South reflected those traditionally used in Expedition Robinson. During the pre-merge portion of the program both teams proved strong as each won three of the immunity challenges. When the tribes merged the members of the North team stuck together while those of the South team initially did not.

Starting with the seventh tribal council the twist of the "black vote" came into play. The black vote gave a person voted out at one tribal council to cast a vote at the next. Ultimately, the alliance of Anna, Dávid, Miklós, and Péter proved dominant in the later stages of the game as it picked off those that were not in it while only suffering one pre-final four casualty of its own (Péter had to be evacuated in episode 9). When it came time for the final four the contestants took part in two challenges to determine the final two. Viki and Miklós lost these challenges and were eliminated. Despite the fact that there was a jury this year, they were deadlocked in there vote and ultimately it was Dávid Hankó who won this season after receiving 52.56% of the public vote (39,992 votes) to Anna Pásztor's 47.44% (36,090 votes).

== Finishing order ==
Contestant	Original Tribes	Merged Tribe	Finish
Nikoletta; 27, Miami	North Team		1st Voted Out; 1st Jury member Day 3
Amigo; 32, Budapest	South Team		2nd Voted Out; 2nd Jury Member; Day 6
Gojo; 34, Oroszlány	South Team		3rd Voted Out; 3rd Jury Member; Day 9
Otti; 28, Budapest	North Team		4th Voted Out; 4th Jury Member; Day 12
Andrea; 30, Százhalombatta	South Team		5th Voted Out; 5th Jury Member; Day 15
Kriszta; 29, Budapest	North Team		6th Voted Out; 6th Jury Member; Day 18
Attila; 30, Budapest	South Team	Merged Tribe	7th Voted Out; 7th Jury Member; Day 21
Noémi; 21, Veszprém	South Team	Merged Tribe	8th Voted Out; 8th Jury Member; Day 24
Péter Knizner; 28, Budapest	North Team	Merged Tribe	Evacuated; 9th Jury Member; Day 27
Jolán; 29, Budapest	North Team	Merged Tribe	9th Voted Out; 10th Jury Member; Day 30
István "Fater" Fejes; 53, Vecsés	South Team	Merged Tribe	10th Voted Out; 11th Jury Member; Day 33
Szilvi; 25, Győr	South Team	Merged Tribe	11th Voted Out; 12th Jury Member; Day 36
Viki; 22, Budapest	South Team	Merged Tribe	Lost Challenge; 13th Jury Member; Day 37
Miklós; 34, Budapest	North Team	Merged Tribe	Lost Challenge; 14th Jury Member; Day 38
Anna Pásztor; 32, Budapest	North Team	Merged Tribe	Runner-Up; Reunion
Dávid Hankó; 34, Budapest	North Team	Merged Tribe	Sole Survivor; Reunion

== Voting history ==
	Original Tribes						Merged Tribe									
Episode #:	1	2	3	4	5	6	7	8	9	10	11	12	13-Reunion			
Eliminated:	Nikoletta; 7/8 votes	Amigo; 5/8 votes	Gojo; 4/7 votes	Otti; 5/7 votes	Andrea; 3/6 votes	Kriszta; 4/6 votes	Attila; 9/10 votes	Noémi; 7/10 votes^{1}	Péter; No vote	Jolán; 5/7 votes^{1}	István; 3/7 votes^{1},^{2}	Szilvi; 3/6 votes^{1}	Viki; No vote	Miklós; No vote	Anna; 47.44% to win	Dávid; 52.56% to win
Voter	Vote															
Dávid	Nikoletta			Otti		Kriszta	Attila	Noémi		Jolán	István	Szilvi		Won	Sole Survivor	
Anna	Nikoletta			Otti		Kriszta	Attila	Noémi		Jolán	István	Szilvi	Won		Runner-Up	
Miklós	Nikoletta			Otti		Kriszta	Attila	Noémi		Jolán	István	Szilvi		Lost		Dávid
Viki		Amigo	Gojo		Szilvi		Attila	Miklós		Dávid	Anna	Miklós	Lost		Anna	
Szilvi		István	Gojo		Andrea		Attila	Noémi		Jolán	Anna	Miklós			Anna	
István		Amigo	Viki		Andrea		Attila	Noémi		Jolán	Anna	Dávid			Anna	
Jolán	Nikoletta			Otti		Miklós	Attila	Noémi		Dávid	Dávid					Dávid
Péter	Nikoletta			Otti		Kriszta	Attila	Noémi							Anna	
Noémi		Amigo	Gojo		Andrea		Attila	Szilvi		~~Péter~~					Anna	
Attila		Amigo	Noémi		Noémi		Miklós	Dávid								Dávid
Kriszta	Nikoletta			Anna		Miklós										Dávid
Andrea		Amigo	Gojo		Noémi											Dávid
Otti	Nikoletta			Anna												Dávid
Gojo		István	Noémi													Dávid
Amigo		Noémi													Anna	
Nikoletta	Kriszta														Anna	

^1 Starting with the seventh tribal council and continuing until the twelfth tribal council, the contestant voted out at the previous tribal council was permitted to vote.

^2 At the eleventh tribal council, both Anna and István received three votes. Because of this they were forced to draw lots in order to determine who would be eliminated.
