= Vinkovci Treasure =

Hoard of Roman silver plate

Coordinates: 45.288188°N 18.801077°E

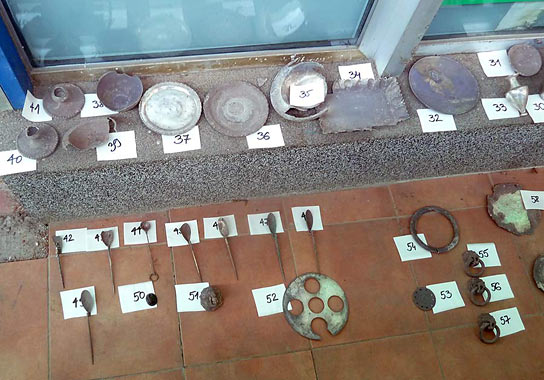
- Items from the Vinkovci Treasure shortly after their discovery
- Material: Silver decorated with gold and niello
- Created: 4th century
- Period/culture: Roman Empire
- Discovered: Vinkovci, Croatia, in March 2012
- Present location: Mimara Museum, Zagreb

The Vinkovci Treasure (Croatian: Vinkovačko blago) or Cibalae Treasure is a hoard of late Roman silver plate, discovered in Vinkovci, Croatia at the end of March 2012. Consisting of 48 artifacts weighing a total of about 36 kilograms (79 lb), the hoard includes a variety of domestic utensils and tableware, some of which is elaborately decorated with various designs and depictions. The hoard appears to have been made locally, probably in a workshop in the town, and is thought to date to the late 4th century AD. Following its discovery during construction works in the centre of Vinkovci, it was put on public display in Vinkovci and at the Museum of Arts and Crafts in Zagreb prior to a programme of conservation funded by the Croatian government.

== Discovery and description ==
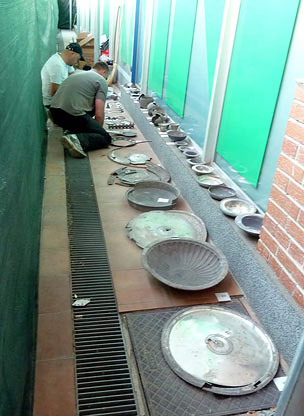
Plates and dishes from the Vinkovci Treasure

The hoard was discovered at a building site on Duga street in the centre of Vinkovci. The discovery was made on 23 March 2012 by Geoarheo, a private archaeological company from Zagreb, under the supervision of archaeologist Šime Vrkić. As Vinkovci's city centre is a protected heritage zone due to its thousands of years of habitation, archaeological surveys are required ahead of development projects.

48 artefacts of silver tableware were found, with a total weight of around 36 kilograms (79 lb). The items were found in what appears to have been a storage pit, at a depth of about 70 centimetres (28 in) below the modern ground level. They had been carefully placed within a large pottery bowl, which had been placed in the ground and covered over with dirt, accounting for their mostly very good state of preservation. The find came as a complete surprise to the archaeologists, who were used to finding small non-precious objects but had not expected to make a major discovery. According to Vrkić, "It was hard to believe that it is silver, because they always find some small things, and when we find something half a meter long ... it was hard to believe that it was silver and it was ancient."

The items include plates, bowls, jugs, cups and spoons. Some are gilded or decorated with niello. Many of the artefacts are engraved with motifs depicting animals, plants, buildings and human figures. One platter shows what appears to be a scene of Bellerophon slaying the chimera. Another shows a shepherd watching his flock. Another plate bears the inscription AQVILA ANTONINVS FECIT ("made by Antoninus Aquila").

== Interpretation and reaction ==
The discovery has been hailed by Vinkovci City Museum's archaeologist Hrvoje Vulić as "one of the most important finds in Croatian archaeology, crowning 40 years of systematic rescue excavations in Vinkovci." According to Richard Hobbs, who curates the British Museum's Romano-British collections, the fact that it was found and excavated in situ by professional archaeologists means that "a more perfect set of circumstances surrounding the discovery of such a treasure could not be dreamed of."

The hoard was deposited during a turbulent period in Roman history. At the time Vinkovci, which was a Roman colony called Colonia Aurelia Cibalae, was one of the leading towns in the province of Pannonia Secunda on the eastern border of the Roman Empire. It was the birthplace of two 4th century emperors, Valentinian I and Valens. The hoard is thought to have been buried due to an increase of insecurity in the region, perhaps due to civil unrest, political turmoil or a barbarian incursion.

The quality of the items has been assessed as "good but not excellent", and they are thought to have been produced by the same hand, probably in a local workshop. The owner was evidently a rich citizen and the find is a good illustration of the wealth and quality of craftsmanship present in the town at the time. Comparisons have been drawn with other hoards of around the same period – the Sevso Treasure thought to have come from Hungary, the Mildenhall Treasure found in England, and the Kaiseraugst Treasure from Switzerland. The hoard includes a number of items similar to those found at Mildenhall and Kaiseraugst.

== Conservation and display ==
Many of the objects found in the hoard are damaged and tarnished but the Croatian Ministry of Culture is funding their conservation in Zagreb. Croatia's national Archaeological Museum will be carrying out the conservation with the assistance of experts from the Romano-Germanic Central Museum in Mainz. 26 of the artefacts are damaged to varying degrees of severity, generally as a result of corrosion of the silver. In most cases the original surface of the objects is obscured by a layer of corrosive products.

Initially the finds were put in display for a short time in Vinkovci in the condition in which they were found. They were later moved to the Archaeological museum in the capital where they are to be conserved and studied. It is intended that they will ultimately be returned to the City Museum in Vinkovci where they will be put on permanent display, possibly in a new building dedicated for that purpose. According to the museum's Hrvoje Vulić, "This will be our kind of Mona Lisa. So you go to the Louvre to see the Mona Lisa, but then you look at everything else. Thus we also hope that this treasure will attract more people to Vinkovci."

== See also ==
- Sevso Treasure
