= Survivor – A sziget season 4 =

Survivor – A sziget
- Season 4
- Presented by: Bence Istenes
- No. of days: 42
- No. of castaways: 18
- Winner: Dávid Tömböly
- Runner-up: Fanni Sós
- Location: Caramoan, Philippines

Release
- Original network: RTL Klub
- Original release: September 24 – November 10, 2018

Season chronology
- ← Previous; Season 3 Next → Season 5

Survivor – A sziget (season 4) is the fourth season of the Hungarian reality television series Survivor – A sziget. The season consists of 18 Hungarians competing in tribes of two for reward and immunity to avoid tribal council, where they vote one of their own off the tribe. The season was filmed in Caramoan, Philippines and presented by Bence Istenes, premiered on RTL Klub on 24 September 2018.

The season concluded on 10 November 2018 when Dávid Tömböly won Ft. 20,000,000 against Fanni Sós in a 5-4 jury vote and also claimed the title of Sole Survivor.

== Contestants ==
List of Survivor - A sziget (season 4) contestants
Contestant	Original Tribe	Episode 7 Tribe	Merged Tribe	Voted Out	Island of the Dead	Finish
Sándor "Sanyi" Tokaji; 48, Szolnok	Gagamba			1st Voted Out; Day 3		18th Day 3
Bence Botyánszki; 35, Békéscsaba	Agila			2nd Voted Out; Day 7		17th Day 7
Eszter "Eszti" Nagy; 27, Budapest	Agila	Agila		Left Competition; Day 8		16th Day 8
Róbert "Robi" Barna; Returned to Game	Agila	Agila		3rd Voted Out; Day 10		
Viktória "Viki" Dékány; 26, Budapest	Gagamba	Gagamba		4rd Voted Out; Day 14		15th Day 14
Balázs Varga; 26, Gheorgheni, Romania		Agila		Left Competition; Day 19		14th Day 19
Kitty Landauer; 32, Budapest	Gagamba	Gagamba		5th Voted Out; Day 19		13th Day 19
Eszter Petneházi; 31, Nyíregyháza	Agila	Agila	Bayani	Lost Challenge; Day 23	Lost Duel; 1st Jury Member; Day 27	12th Day 27
Emese Margittai; 50, Érd		Gagamba	Bayani	Lost Duel; Day 30	Lost Duel; 2nd Jury Member; Day 30	11th Day 30
Benjámin "Beni" Süle; 26, Érd	Gagamba	Gagamba	Bayani	8th Voted Out; Day 30	Lost Duel; 3rd Jury Member; Day 36	10th Day 36
Nóra "Nóri" Maróti; 37, Tiszasziget	Agila	Agila	Bayani	6th Voted Out; Day 22	Lost Duel; 4th Jury Member; Day 37	9th Day 37
Jérémy János Tóth; 24, Budapest	Agila	Agila		Lost Challenge; Day 20	Lost Duel; 5th Jury Member; Day 38	8th Day 38
Gábor Koller; 34, Budapest	Gagamba	Gagamba	Bayani	10th Voted Out; Day 36	Lost Duel; 6th Jury Member; Day 39	7th Day 39
Veronika "Vera" Balázs; 28, Joseni, Romania	Gagamba	Gagamba	Bayani	7th Voted Out; Day 25	Lost Duel; 7th Jury Member; Day 39	6th Day 39
Róbert "Robi" Barna; 30, Budapest	Agila	Agila	Bayani	11th Voted Out; Day 38	Lost Duel; Removed From Jury; Day 39 (Note: In the final two, Dávid won the final challenge. As a result, he was allowed to remove a jury member's vote from the final vote tally. He chose to remove Robi's.)	5th Day 39
Dávid Tömböly; Returned to Game	Gagamba	Gagamba	Bayani	9th Voted Out; Day 33	Won Duel; Day 39	
Alexandra Demeter; 28, Budapest	Gagamba	Gagamba	Bayani	Left Competition; 8th Jury Member; Day 41		4th Day 41
Tamás Bíró; 23, Budapest	Agila	Agila	Bayani	Lost Challenge; 9th Jury Member; Day 41		3rd Day 41
Fanni Sós; 24, Debrecen	Agila	Agila	Bayani	Runner-up; Day 42		2nd Day 42
Dávid Tömböly; 27, Győr	Gagamba	Gagamba	Bayani	Sole Survivor; Day 42		1st Day 42
