= Survivor – A sziget season 3 =

Survivor – A sziget
- Season 3
- Presented by: Bence Istenes
- No. of days: 44
- No. of castaways: 17
- Winner: Iliász King Shweirif
- Runner-up: Ferenc Varga
- Location: Caramoan, Philippines
- No. of episodes: 35

Release
- Original network: RTL Klub
- Original release: August 28 – October 13, 2017

Season chronology
- ← Previous; Season 2 Next → Season 4

Survivor – A sziget (season 3) is the third season of the Hungarian version of Survivor which was broadcast on RTL Klub from 28 August 2017. Hosted by Bence Istenes, the show was brought back to Hungarian television after 13 years. The format is similar to the U.S. version of Survivor and to the Australian Survivor. It is broadcast on weekdays at 7.pm.

There are 17 contestants divided into two tribes called Buwaya and Ibon. The winner of the show, the "Sole Survivor" will get 20 Million Ft. Unlike the previous two seasons the winner won't be decided by a public vote, rather with the usual Survivor jury format. The winner of the season was Iliász.

== Results ==
- Episode 1 First Reward challenge winners: Buwaya
- Episode 2 First Immunity challenge winners: Buwaya
- Episode 3 First Tribal Council Ibon
- Episode 4 Reward Challenge winners: Ibon
- Episode 5 Immunity Challenge winners: Buwaya
- Episode 6 Tribal Council: Ibon
- Episode 7 Reward Challenge winners: Buwaya
- Episode 8 Immunity Challenge winners: Buwaya
- Episode 9 Tribal Council: Ibon
- Episode 10 Reward Challenge winners: Ibon + Tribe Switch
- Episode 11 Immunity Challenge winners: Buwaya
- Episode 12 Tribal Council: Ibon
- Episode 13 Reward Challenge winners: Ibon
- Episode 14 Immunity Challenge winners: Ibon
- Episode 15 Tribal Council: Buwaya
- Episode 16 Merge + Challenge to stay in the game
- Episode 17 Individual Immunity Challenge winner: Adrienn + Tribal Council
- Episode 18 Reward Challenge winner: Szandra
- Episode 19 Individual Immunity Challenge winner: Iliász
- Episode 20 Tribal Council
- Episode 21 Reward Challenge winners: Zoli, Benedek, Klaudia
- Episode 22 Island of the Dead Challenge + Individual Immunity Challenge winner: Iliász
- Episode 23 Tribal Council
- Episode 24 Reward Challenge winner: Benedek
- Episode 25 Island of the Dead Challenge 2
- Episode 26 Immunity Challenge winner: Feri + Tribal council
- Episode 27 Reward Challenge winner: Szandi
- Episode 28 Immunity Challenge winner: Feri + Island of the Dead Challenge 3
- Episode 29 Tribal Council
- Episode 30 Immunity Challenge winner: Feri
- Episode 31 Tribal Council
- Episode 32 Final Island of the Dead Challenge winner: Iliász
- Episode 33 First Semi-Final winner: Iliász
- Episode 34 Second Semi-Final winner: Feri
- Episode 35 Final Tribal Council

== Contestants ==
List of Survivor - a sziget contestants
Contestant	Original tribe	Switched tribe	Merged tribe	Voted out	Island of the Dead	Finish
Nóri Luca Nemeth; Returned to game	Ibon			1st voted out Day 4		
Gergely Ochenka; 34, Budapest	Ibon			2nd voted out Day 8		17th Day 8
Lilla Olajos; Returned to game	Ibon			3rd voted out Day 12		
Bálint Markovosko; 25, Szabadi	Buwaya			Quit; Day 13		16th Day 13
Tamás Blait; 30,	Ibon	Ibon		Quit; Day 15		15th Day 15
Krisztián Szalay; 30, Budapest	Buwaya	Buwaya		Quit; Day 16		14th Day 16
Bianka Décsik; 34, Budapest	Buwaya	Ibon		4th voted out Day 16		13th Day 16
Adrienn Czene; 22, Budapest	Buwaya	Buwaya	Mandirigma	7th voted out Day 26	Lost Challenge 1; 1st jury member Day 28	12th Day 28
Zoltán Egri; 25, Budapest	Ibon	Ibon	Mandirigma	8th voted out Day 31	Lost Challenge 2; 2nd jury member Day 33	11th Day 33
Gergő Bundy; 21, Vác	Ibon	Buwaya	Mandirigma	6th voted out Day 23	Lost Challenge 3; 3rd jury member Day 36	10th Day 36
Lilla Olajos; 25, Veresegyház	Ibon	Buwaya		Lost Challenge; Day 21	Lost Challenge 4; 4th jury member Day 38	9th Day 38
Benedek Bodzán; 25, Budapest	Ibon	Ibon	Mandirigma	10th voted out Day 37	Lost Challenge 4; 5th jury member Day 38	8th Day 38
Nóri Luca Nemeth; 25, Budapest	Ibon	Ibon		Lost Challenge; Day 21	Lost Challenge 5; 6th jury member Day 41	7th Day 41
Anita Panyik; 30, Budapest	Ibon	Buwaya		5th voted out Day 20	Lost Challenge 5; 7th jury member Day 41	6th Day 41
Klaudia Fisher; 22, Budapest	Ibon	Ibon	Mandirigma	11th voted out Day 40	Lost Challenge 5; 8th jury member Day 41	5th Day 41
Iliász King Shweirif; Returned to Game	Buwaya	Buwaya	Mandirigma	9th voted out Day 34	Winner of the Island of the Dead; Day 41	
Barbara Hakown; 37, Gomba	Buwaya	Ibon	Mandirigma			4th Day 43
Alexandra Kocsis; 28, Mór	Buwaya	Buwaya	Mandirigma			3rd Day 43
Ferenc Varga; 48, Rákóczifalva	Buwaya	Ibon	Mandirigma	Winner of Semi-final 2 Day 43		Runner-up; Day 44
Iliász King Shweirif; 29, Budapest	Buwaya	Buwaya	Mandirigma	Winner of Semi-final 1 Day 42		Sole Survivor; Day 44
