= Polgárdi =

- Town
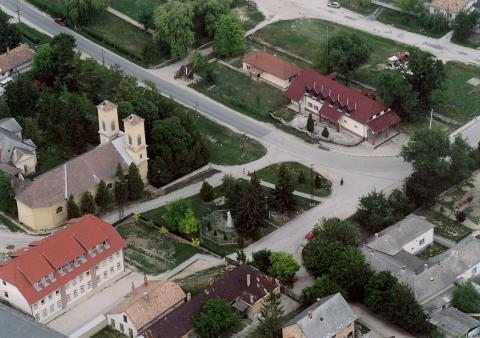
- Aerial view of St. Ivan's Church

- Flag Coat of arms

- Location of Polgárdi
- Coordinates: 47.05380°N 18.30492°E
- Country: Hungary
- County: Fejér
- District: Székesfehérvár

Area
  - Total: 72.16 km^{2} (27.86 sq mi)

Population (2014)
  - Total: 6,783
  - Density: 92.7/km^{2} (240/sq mi)
- Time zone: UTC+1 (CET)
  - Summer (DST): UTC+2 (CEST)
- Postal code: 8154
- Area code: (+36) 22
- Motorways: M7
- Distance from Budapest: 82.1 km (51.0 mi) Northeast
- Website: www.polgardi.hu

Polgárdi is a town in Fejér county, Hungary, reportedly the site where the Sevso Treasure was discovered.

== Geography ==
Polgárdi is located at an elevation of about 144 metres, about 12 kilometres northeast of Lake Balaton, a resort area in western Hungary popular with German tourists, and about 30 kilometres southeast is Sárbogárd. About 17 kilometres northeast of Polgárdi is the city Székesfehérvár. South of Polgárdi runs the M7 motorway. In addition, the city is connected to the railway line from Székesfehérvár to Tapolca.

== History ==
Lake Balaton was popular with Romans, especially for the generals who ruled Pannonia, the Roman province that now includes parts of Bosnia, Croatia, Hungary, Romania, and Albania. It was a hub of the Roman Empire, and therefore the site of trade routes and wars. In the fourth and fifth centuries Goths and Vandals swept down from the north.

In the Middle Ages, there were three settlements at the present Polgárdi site: Cinca, Polgárdi, and Bökény-somlyó. The first mention of Polgárdi dates from 1277. Since 1397, George Batthyány owned the land, until 1945 when the land left the control of the Batthyány family.

The nearby town of Fehérvár was settled in 1543, but it was often a double taxation victim (both the Hungarian landowners and the Turks paid the locals), so the population fell dramatically. Local people also actively participated in the 1848-49 War of Independence. After the expulsion of the Ottoman Turks, many locals were attracted to settlements, and civic development began in Polgárdi in the 19th century.

It is the reported location of the controversial Seuso Treasure, traced back to a villa excavated in the area, dating back to the late Roman Empire period. Hungarian authorities claim that the treasure was discovered by a young soldier, József Sümegh, in around 1975–76 near the town. Sümegh's body was found in a nearby cellar in 1980. The official investigation at the time determined that he had committed suicide, but later the police came to the conclusion that he had been killed. As of 2012 the criminal investigation is still ongoing.

Since 2013 it is the seat of the Polgárdi District, which ended in late 2014. The settlements that belonged to the Polgárdi District then became part of the Enying or Székesfehérvár District.

== Sights ==
- Reformed Church, built 1807–1811 (Late Baroque)
- Catholic Church, Szent István király, built 1853

== Twin towns – sister cities ==
Polgárdi is twinned with:

- Dinkelland, Netherlands
- Grafrath, Germany
- Petrești, Romania
- Vlčany, Slovakia
