= Seuso Treasure =

Roman hoard

The Seuso Treasure exhibited in 1990.

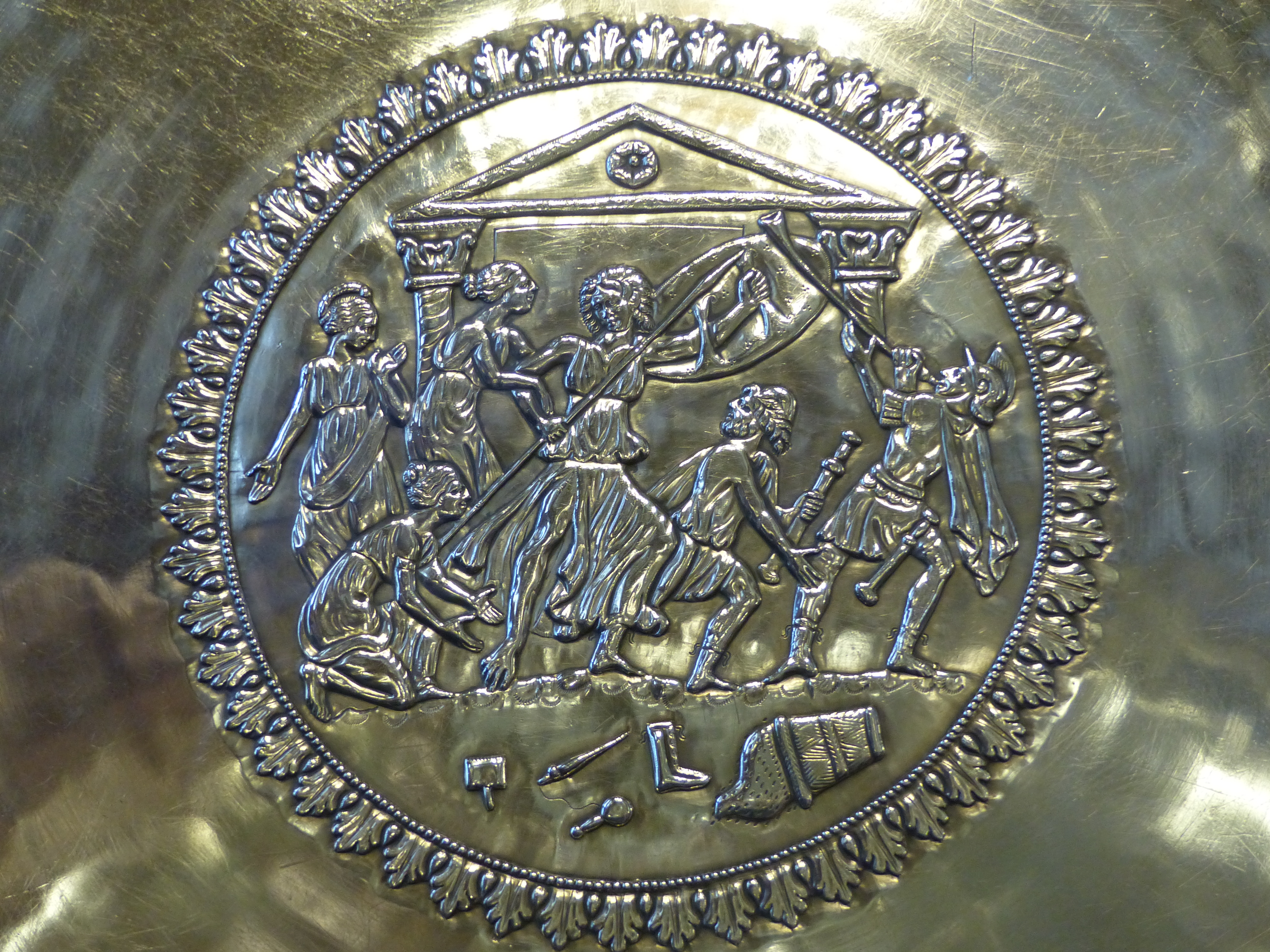
Detail of the Achilles plate

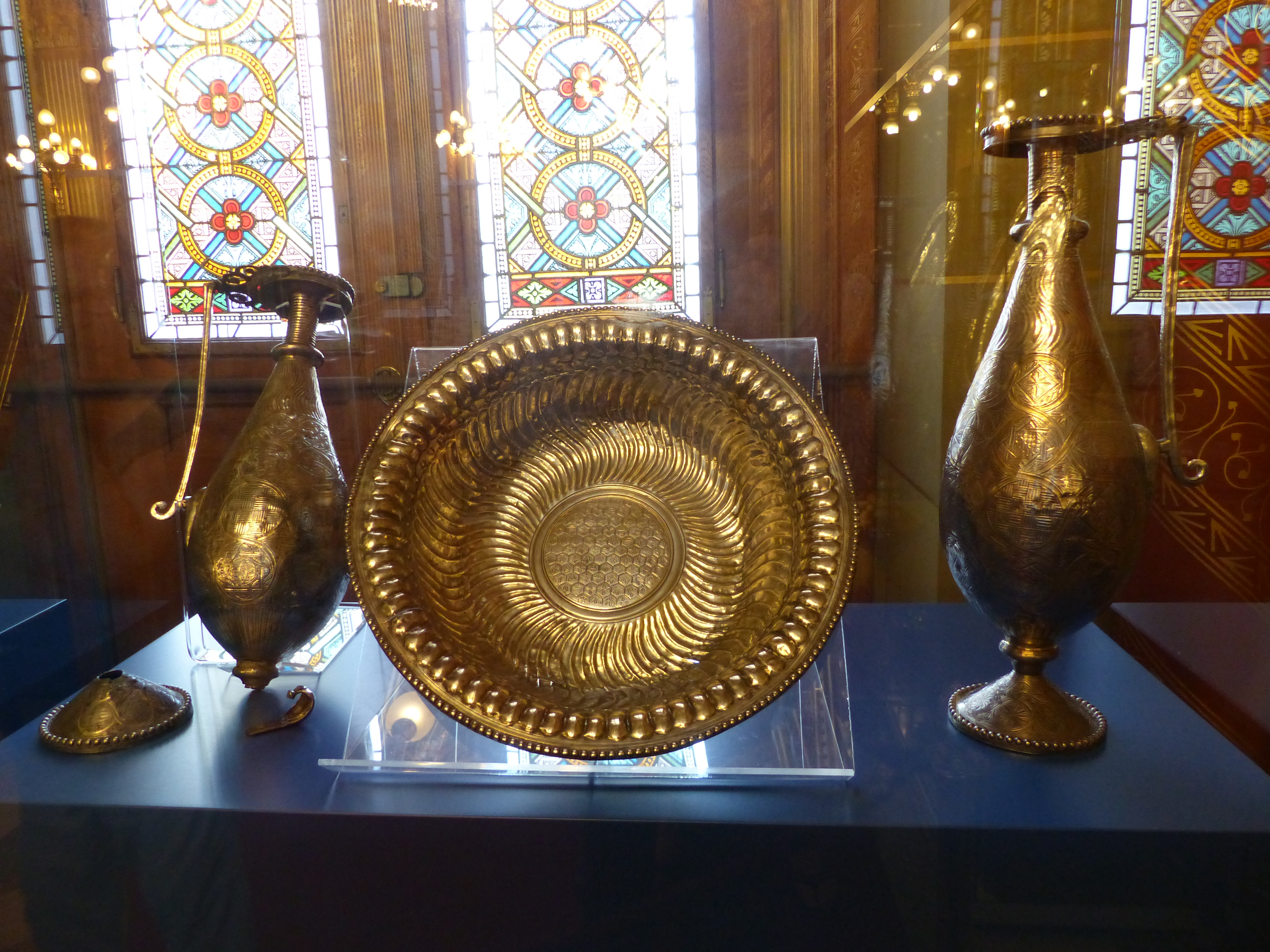
The stoup set

The Seuso Treasure or Sevso Treasure (Hungarian: Seuso-kincsek; Croatian: Seusovo blago), is a hoard of silver objects (14 items) from the late Roman Empire. The first pieces appeared on the market in London in 1980, and the treasure was acquired by a consortium headed by Spencer Compton, 7th Marquess of Northampton. Documentation was provided in which it was stated that it had been found in the Tyre and Sidon regions of Lebanon. It was put up for sale in New York City in 1990 by Sotheby's, but was halted when the documentation was found to be false, and the governments of Hungary, Yugoslavia (now Croatia) and Lebanon made claims of ownership. The claims of ownership by these countries were rejected by a US court, and the treasure remained in the possession of the Marquess of Northampton. Scotland Yard still has an open case on the matter.

The origin and provenance of the treasure are likely known, but not publicly acknowledged. There is much scientific evidence to indicate that the hoard was first acquired in the 1970s after the murder of a Hungarian soldier, who discovered the treasure during illicit digging at an established archaeological site in Hungary. On 26 March 2014 Prime Minister of Hungary Viktor Orbán announced that half of the Seuso Treasure (seven items) had been bought by Hungary. The Prime Minister described it as "Hungary's family silverware". In June 2017 the remaining seven artifacts also returned to Hungary, being bought for €28 million. Today, it is exhibited in the Hungarian National Museum.

== Contents ==
The treasure trove consists of fourteen large decorated silver vessels and the copper cauldron which contained them, and has been dated to the late-fourth or early-fifth century AD. Most notable is a large dish, 70 cm in diameter and weighing nearly 9 kg, which bears the inscription:

Hec Seuso tibi durent per saecula multa
Posteris ut prosint vascula digna tuis

May these, O Seuso, yours for many ages be
Small vessels fit to serve your offspring worthily.

== Discovery ==
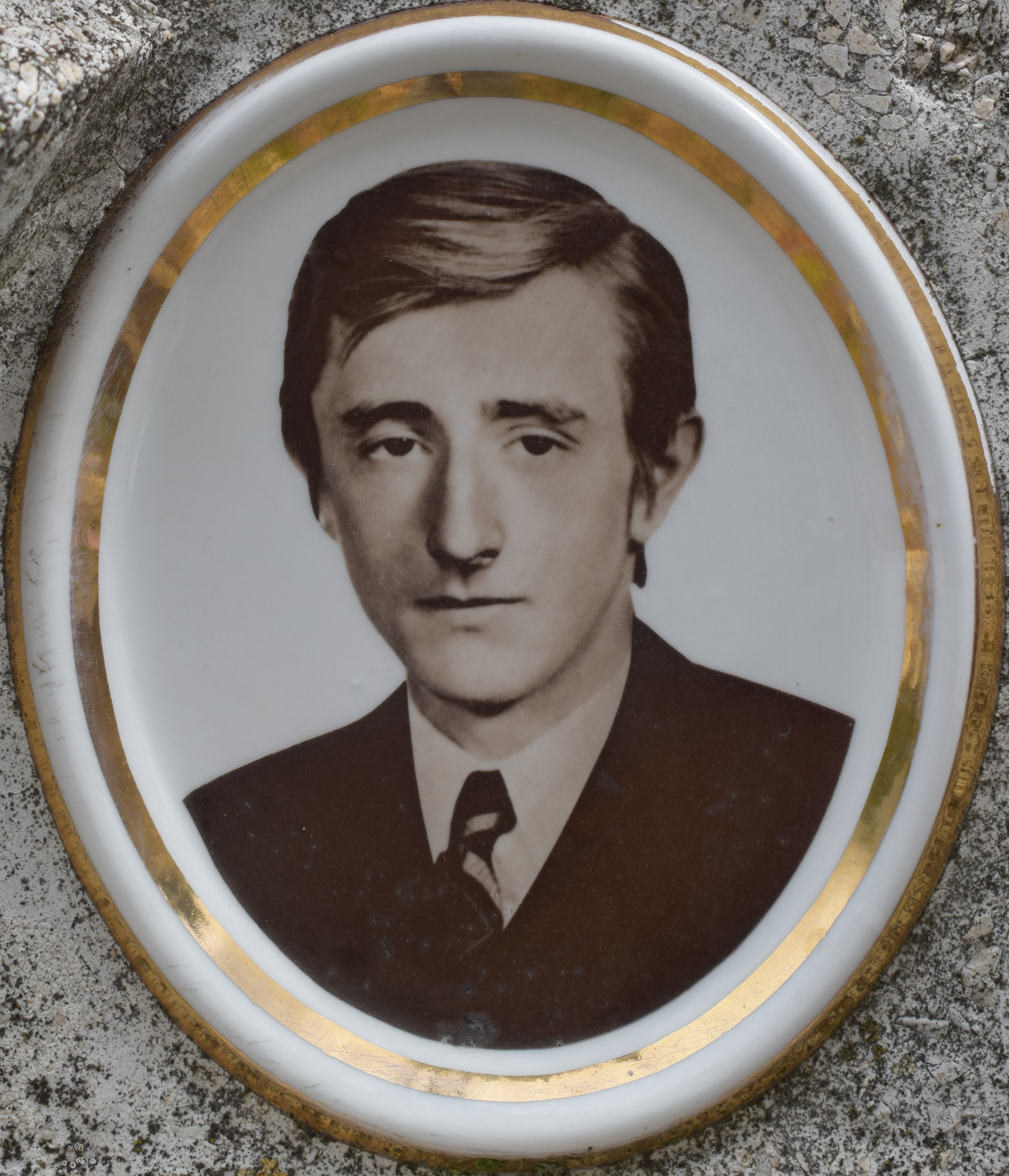
József Sümegh, who is claimed to have found the treasure around 1975–76 near Polgárdi

The hoard first came to attention in 1980, when a single piece in the possession of two antiquities dealers from Vienna was offered for sale in London. Further pieces reached the market, and what is believed to be the complete hoard was acquired by a consortium headed by Spencer Compton, 7th Marquess of Northampton. Documentation supplied by the Lebanese embassy in Switzerland stated that the treasure had originally been found in the Tyre and Sidon regions of Lebanon, and on that basis the consortium negotiated to sell the collection to the Getty Museum in Los Angeles for $10 million. When that deal fell through, the treasure was put up for sale in New York in 1990 by Sotheby's, and was described as being from "what was once the province of Phoenicia in the Eastern Roman Empire".

=== Legal dispute ===
The sale was halted when documentation was thought to be false, and the governments of Hungary, Yugoslavia and Lebanon each made claims of ownership. Hungarian authorities claim that the treasure was discovered by a young soldier, József Sümegh, in around 1975–76 near the town of Polgárdi in central Hungary. Sümegh's body was found in a nearby cellar in 1980. The official investigation at the time determined that he had committed suicide, but the police later concluded that he had been killed. As of 2012 the criminal investigation into his death is still ongoing.

Yugoslavia's case was based on claims that the treasure had been originally found on 30 June 1960 in the village of Barbariga in Istria (present-day Croatia). The village is some 20 kilometres north of the city of Pula, an important city in Roman times. According to local witnesses, the treasure had been discovered in old trenches in a nearby Yugoslav People's Army (JNA) compound. In the 1980s the JNA gave permission to local archaeologists, led by Vesna Girardi-Jurkić, to further excavate the site. According to unconfirmed eyewitness reports of army excavations, the 14 known artefacts were only a small part of a much larger treasure trove as it took soldiers and police brought to the site six days to list all the items found at the site. However, very few details of the project were ever released to the public as the alleged site was entirely within a military area closed off to civilians. Yugoslav archaeologists' efforts eventually failed to provide any conclusive evidence for the treasure's origin, although the soil residue found on the artefacts was proved to match the samples of soil from the area. After the breakup of Yugoslavia the newly independent Croatia pressed on with the case and included the results of the soil analysis in its formal ownership claim to a New York court.

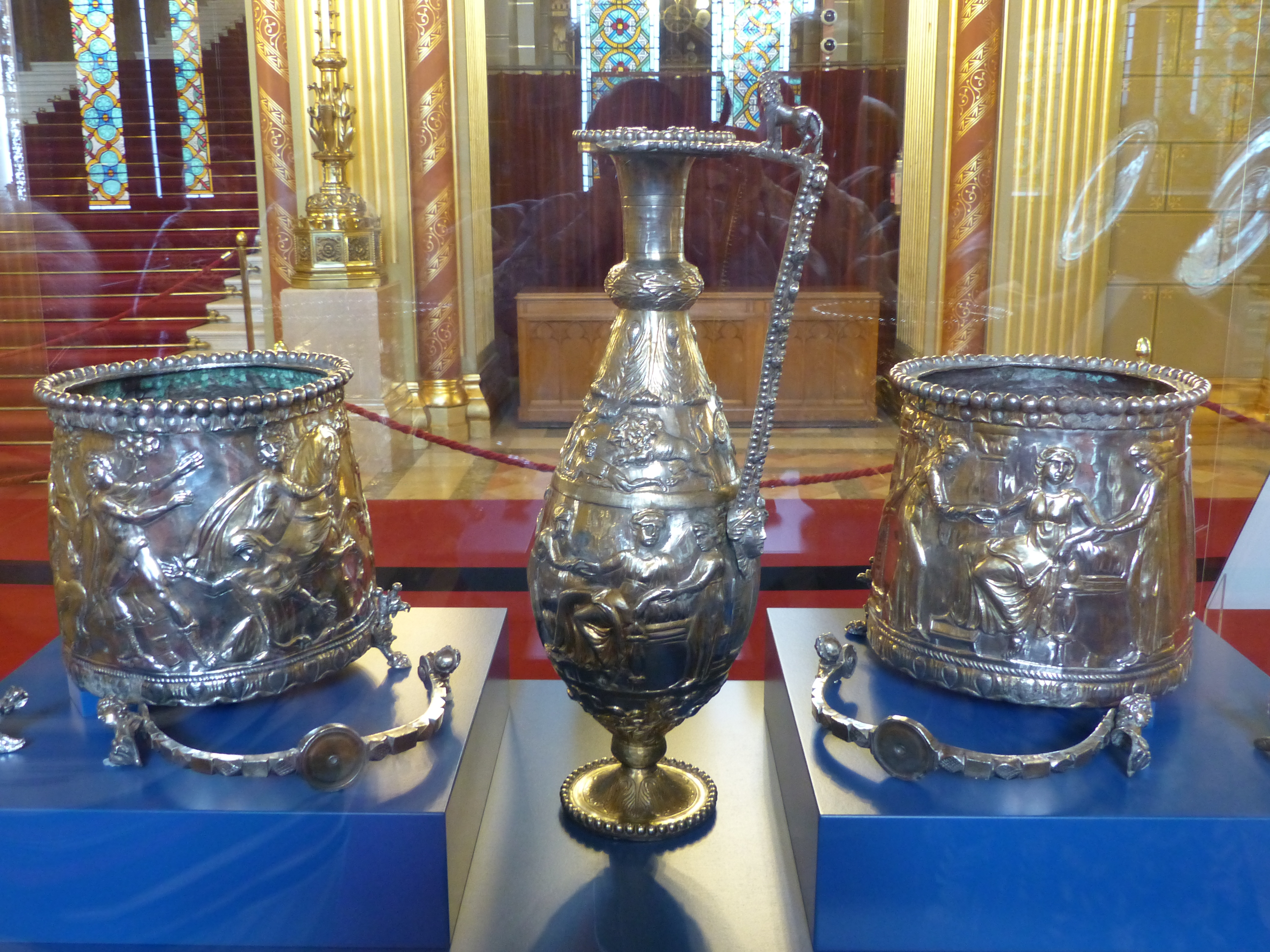
The Hippolytus set

In November 1993, the New York Court of Appeals rejected the claims, and found no case for removing it from the possession of the Marquess of Northampton 1987 Settlement (a trust established by the Marquess of Northampton); the decision was confirmed by the Appellate Division in April 1994. The silver was locked in a bank vault while further legal proceedings followed. The Marquess sued his solicitors Allen & Overy for damages in relation to advice given during the purchase of the silver, and that case was settled out of court in 1999 for a reported £15 million. On 25 June 1999, in written answers to questions in the House of Lords, the British government confirmed that it had no further interest in the case and confirmed the decision not to prosecute.

The Hungarian claim of possession is likely justified by the fact that on one of the main plates, the "Hunting Plate", an inscription is to be seen. It reads "Pelso", the Roman name for Lake Balaton in Hungary; the lake is just west of the alleged place of discovery. Also near to the lake, in 1873 a presumed Roman tripod (later restored, upon which it was discovered that it is a quadripod) was discovered; according to scholars, this object featured similar decoration as the Seuso Treasure items, and is very likely a creation of the same hands. It is housed in the Hungarian National Museum in Budapest.

=== Later developments ===
In September 2006, London auctioneer Bonhams announced that it would exhibit the treasure privately, in a move seen as a prelude to a sale by private treaty or by auction at a future date. A spokesman for the Ministry of Education and Culture of Hungary, which had still claimed it, said it had informed British authorities that it must not be sold. On 12 October 2006, further written answers were given in the House of Lords to questions by Colin Renfrew, Baron Renfrew of Kaimsthorn, particularly relating to Hungary's possible revised claim to the treasure since its admission to the European Union in 2004. Bonhams went ahead with its private exhibition on 17 October 2006.

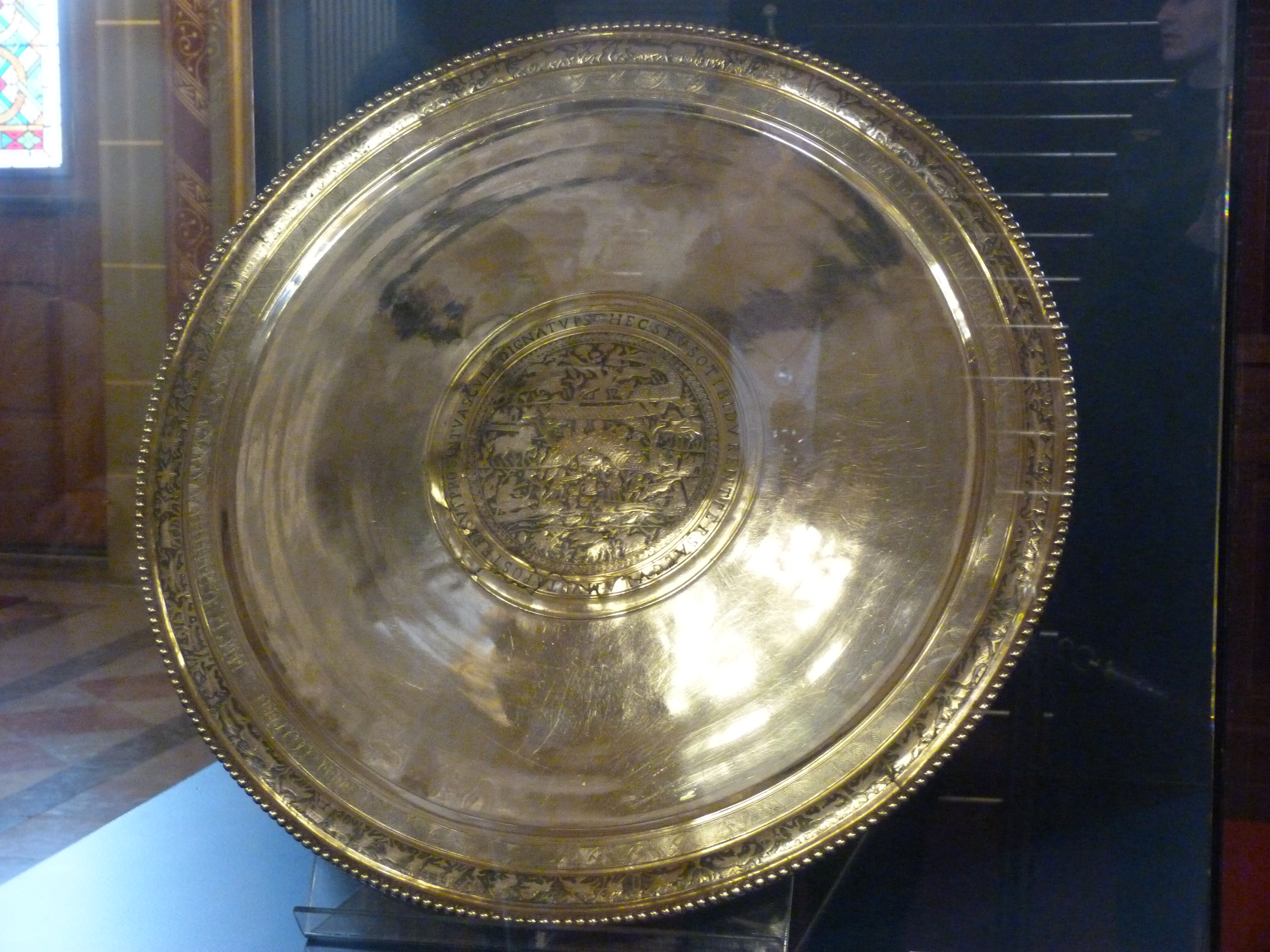
The "Hunting plate" in the Hungarian Parliament Building

In March 2007, The Art Newspaper reported that a further "187 silvergilt spoons, 37 silvergilt drinking cups, and 5 silver bowls", previously unknown, but part of the original hoard, were reputed to exist. Research presented in February 2008 by the Hungarian archaeologist Zsolt Visy strengthened the view that the origin of the treasure may be the Lake Balaton region of Hungary.

The Channel 4 archaeology programme Time Team aired a special on the treasure in December 2008. The programme presented Hungary's evidence for the likely origin of the hoard being near the town of Polgárdi. The Marquess of Northampton withdrew from planned participation in the programme and Channel 4 was not given permission to film the treasure, held in Bonhams' vault in London.

== Return to Hungary ==
On 26 March 2014, Viktor Orbán, the then Hungarian prime minister, announced that half of the Seuso Treasure (seven items) had been returned to Hungary, for a sum of €15 million. The seven artefacts were put on temporary display at the Hungarian Parliament Building on 29 March 2014. On 12 July 2017, the Hungarian PM announced that the other seven pieces had been brought back to Hungary, and the treasure would be displayed together. Since 28 June 2019, the complete treasure has been displayed in the Hungarian National Museum as a permanent exhibition "The Seuso Treasure. The Splendour of Roman Pannonia".

== See also ==
- Carthage Treasure
- Esquiline Treasure
- Mildenhall Treasure
- Northampton Sekhemka statue
- Vinkovci Treasure

== Gallery ==
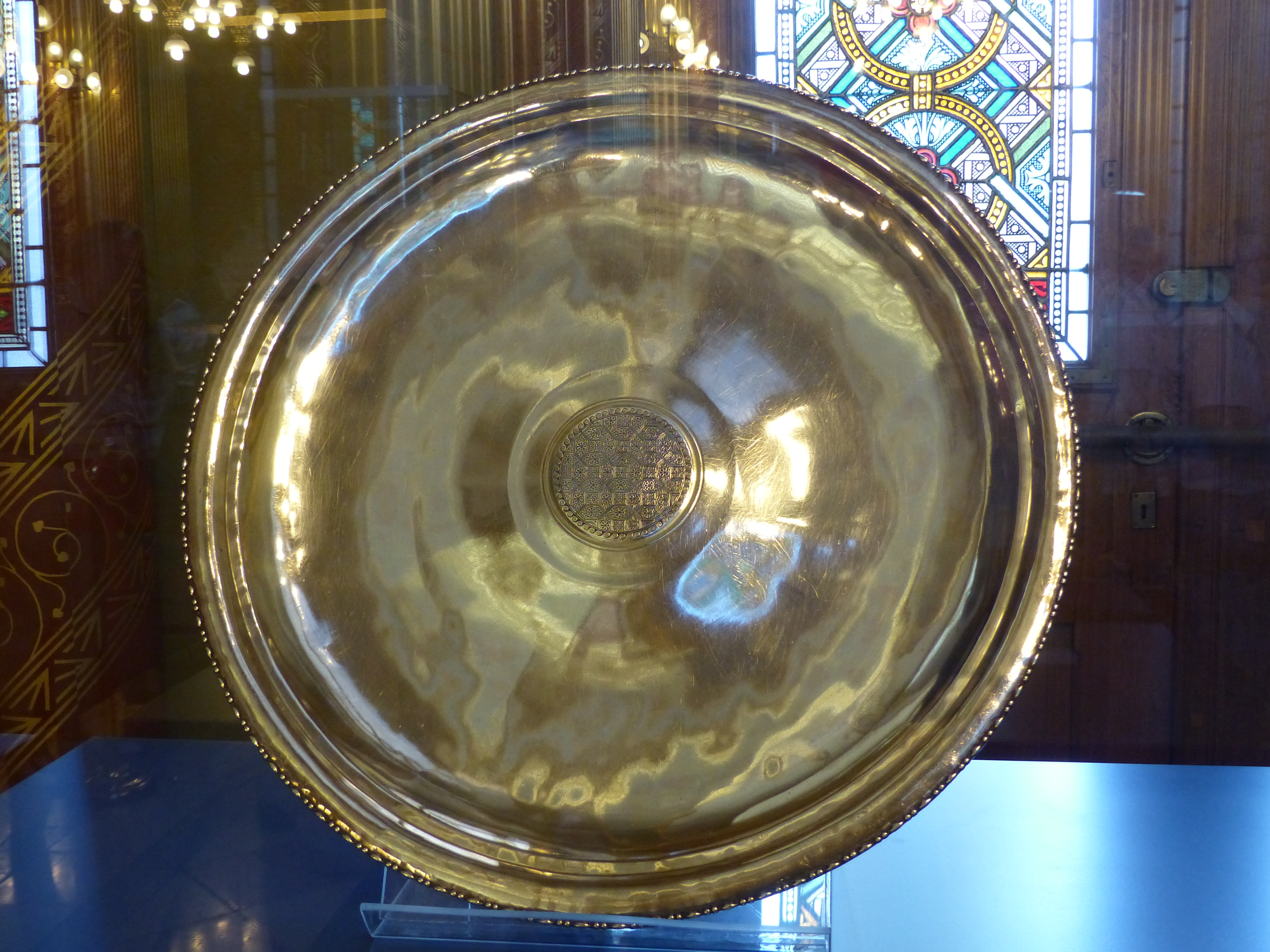
Geometric plate

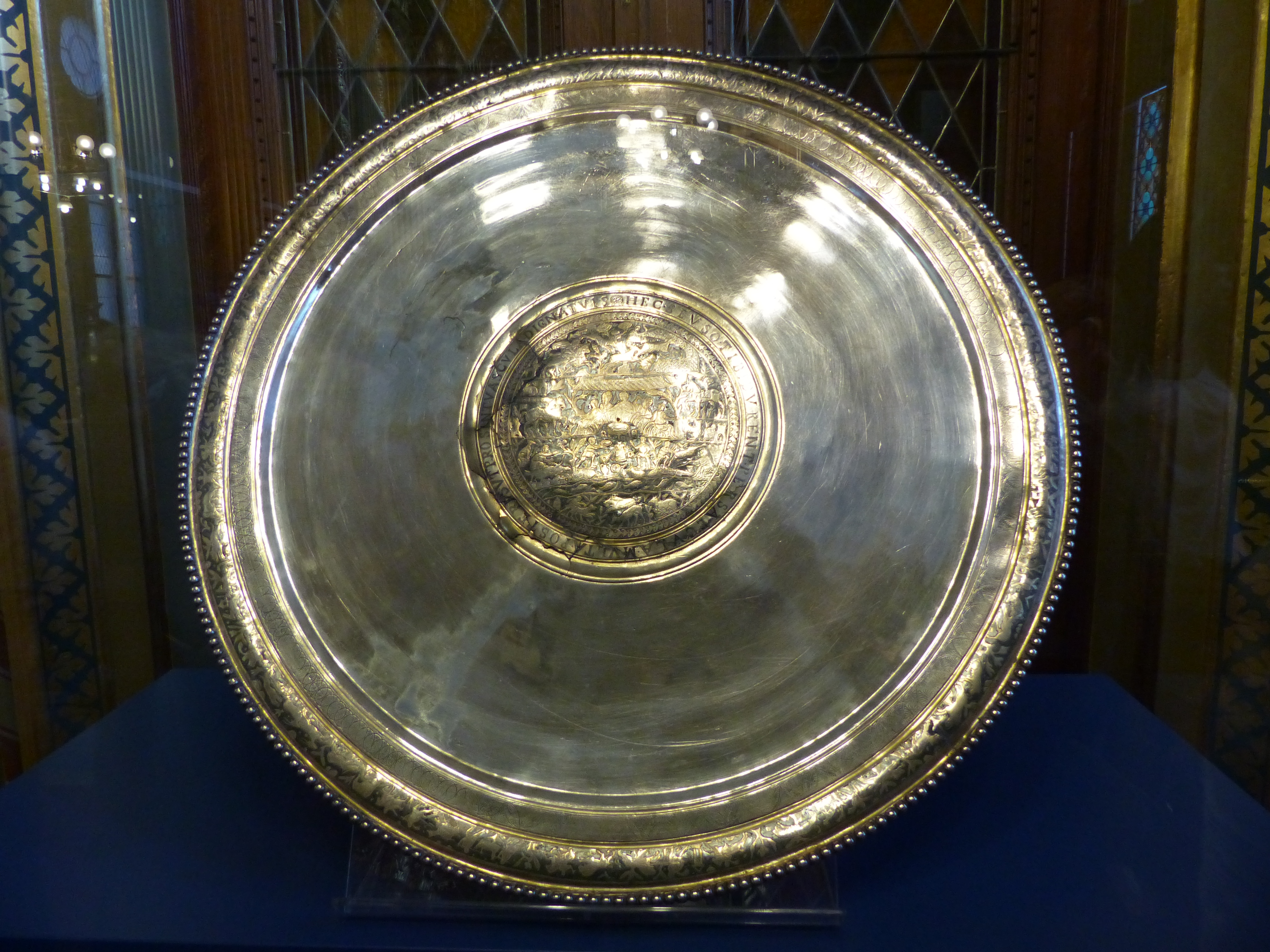
Hunting plate

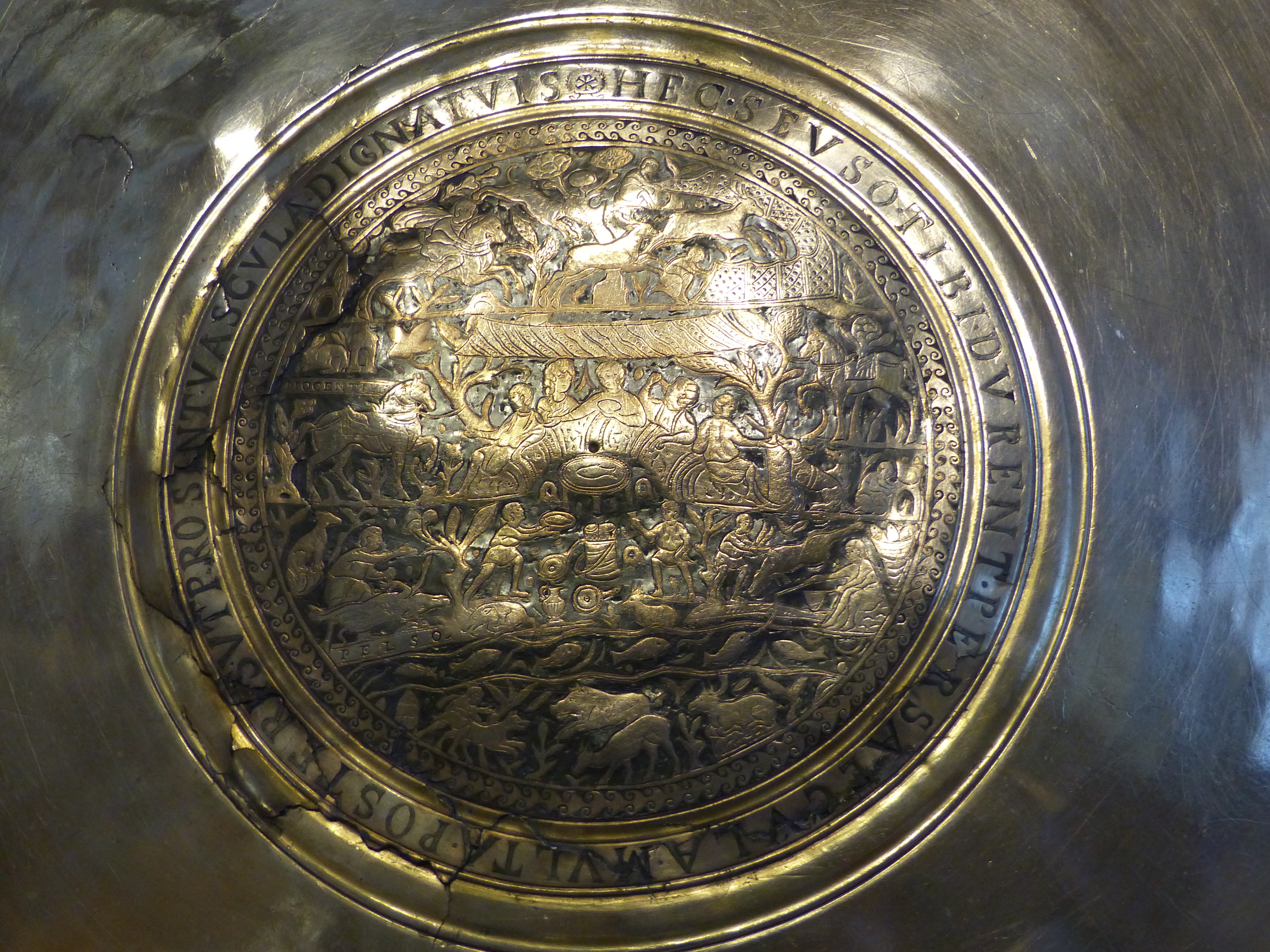
Hunting plate (detail)

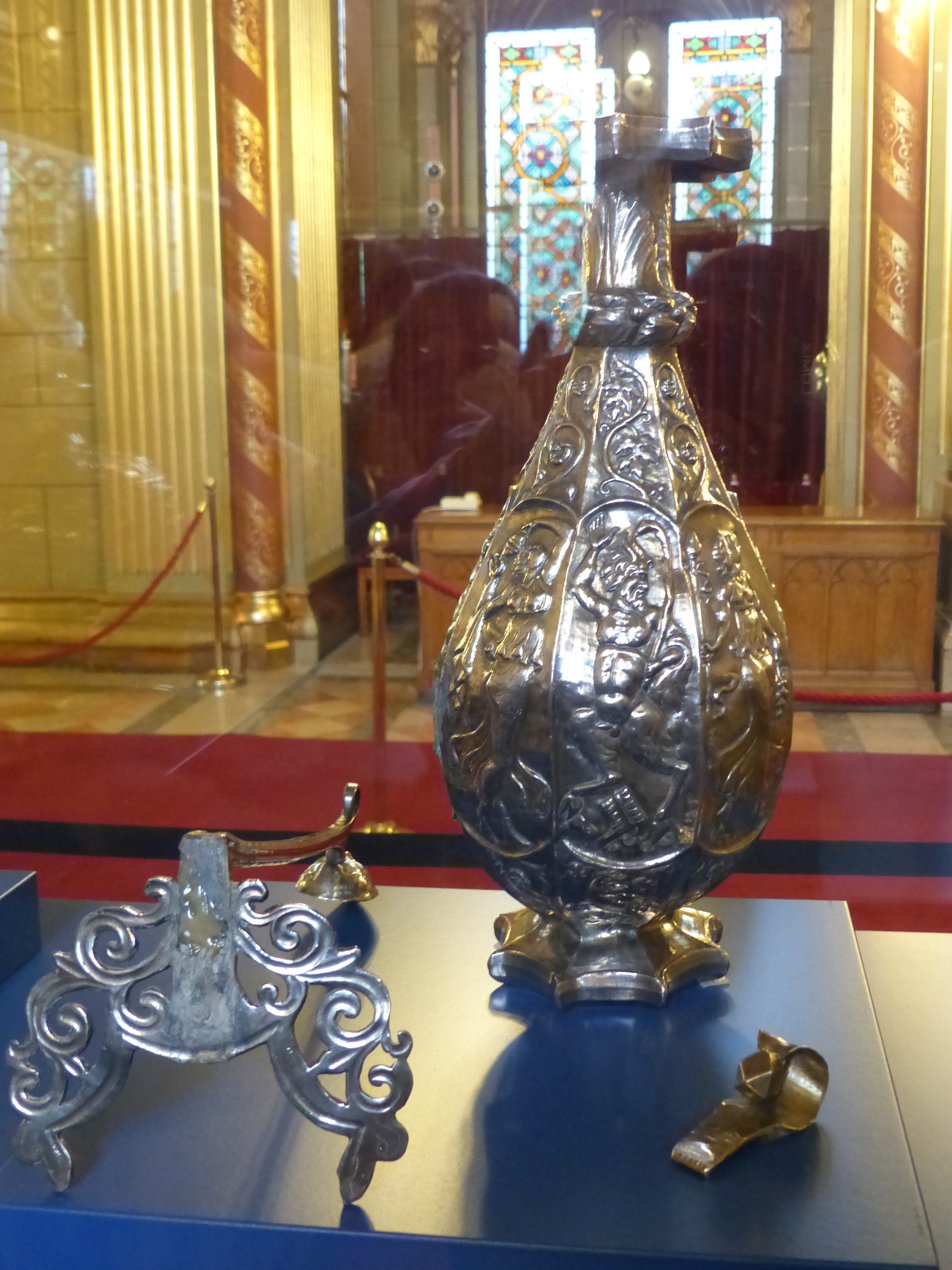
Dionysus

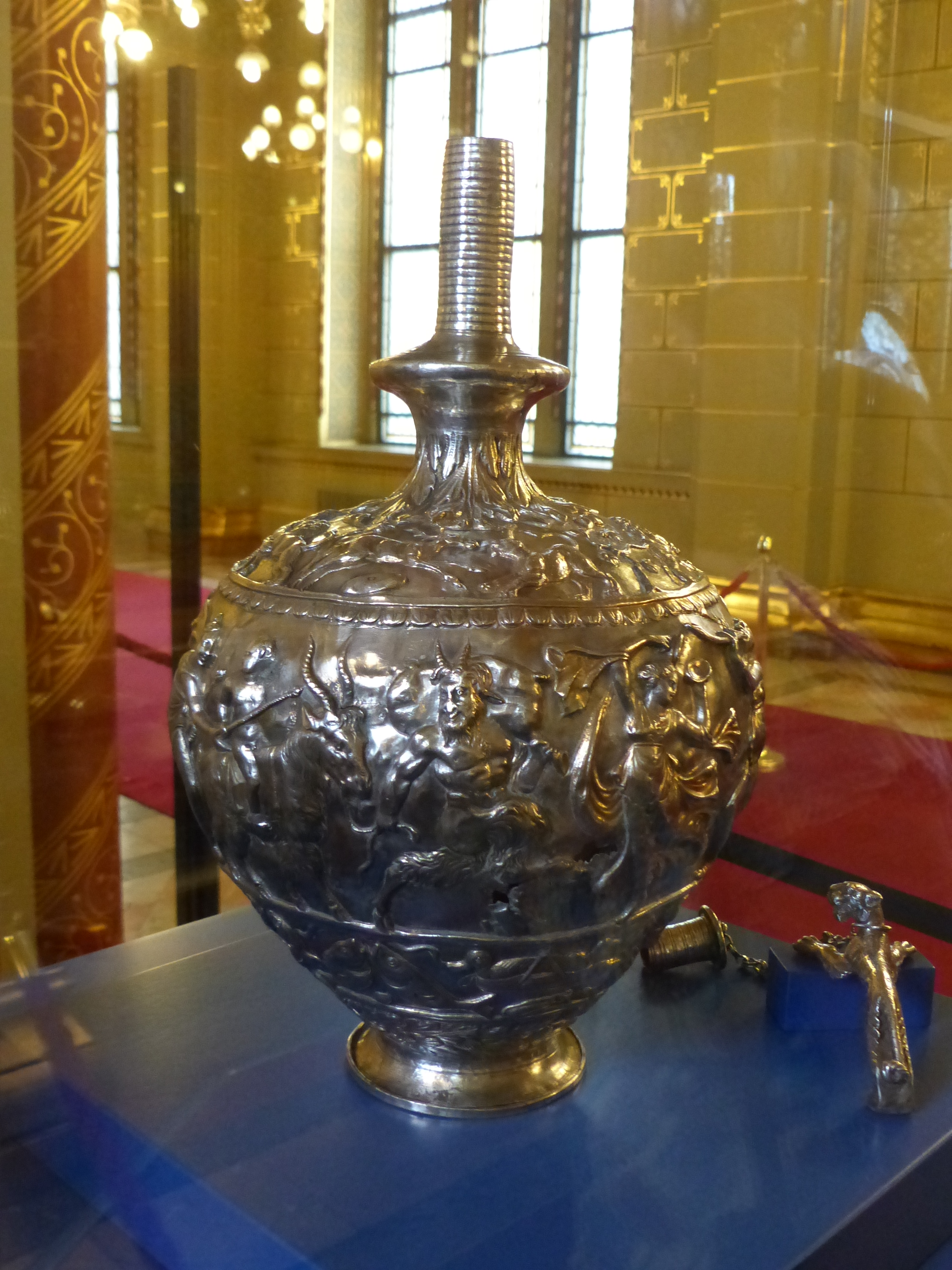
Dionysus

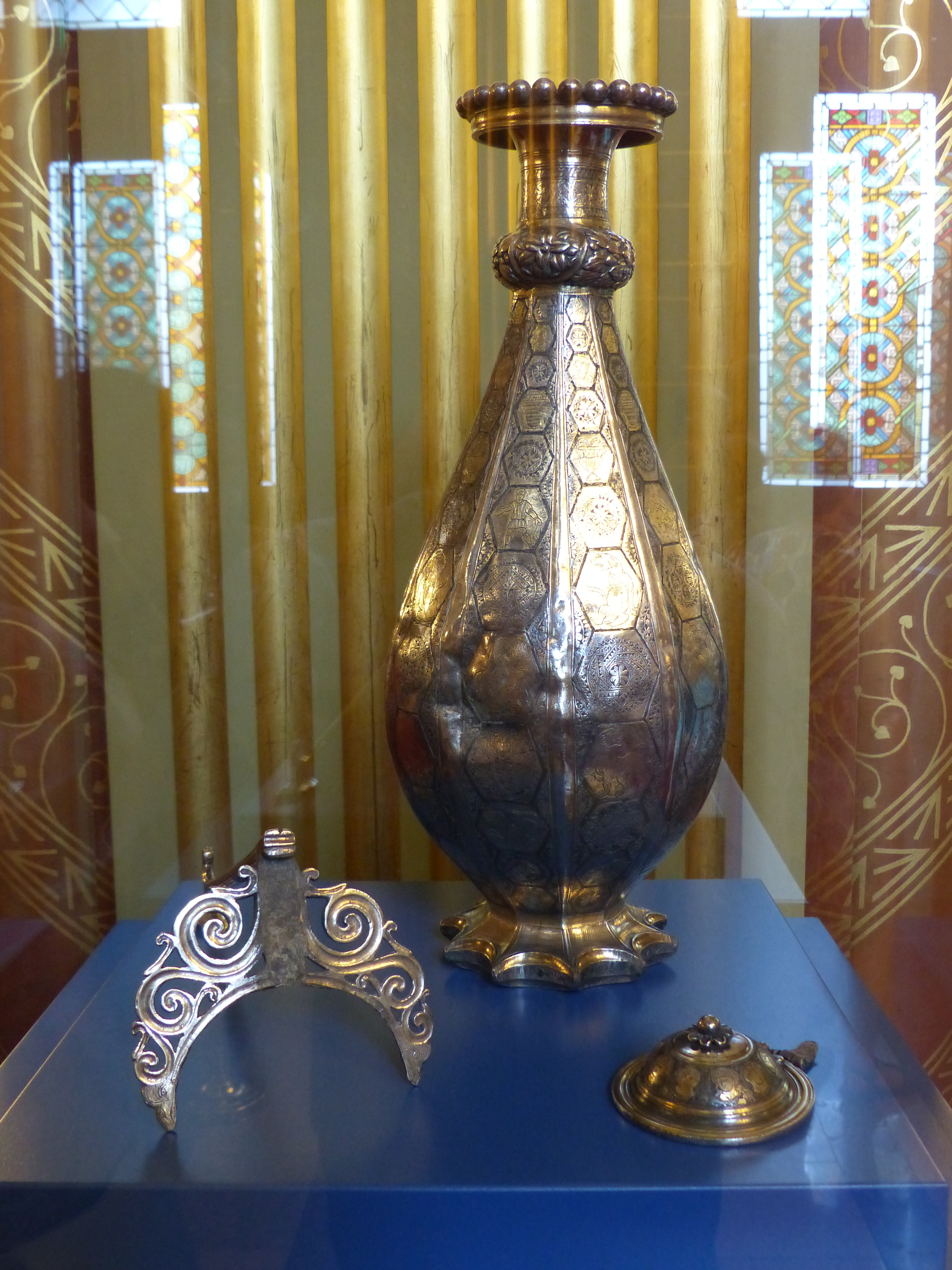
Animal stoup

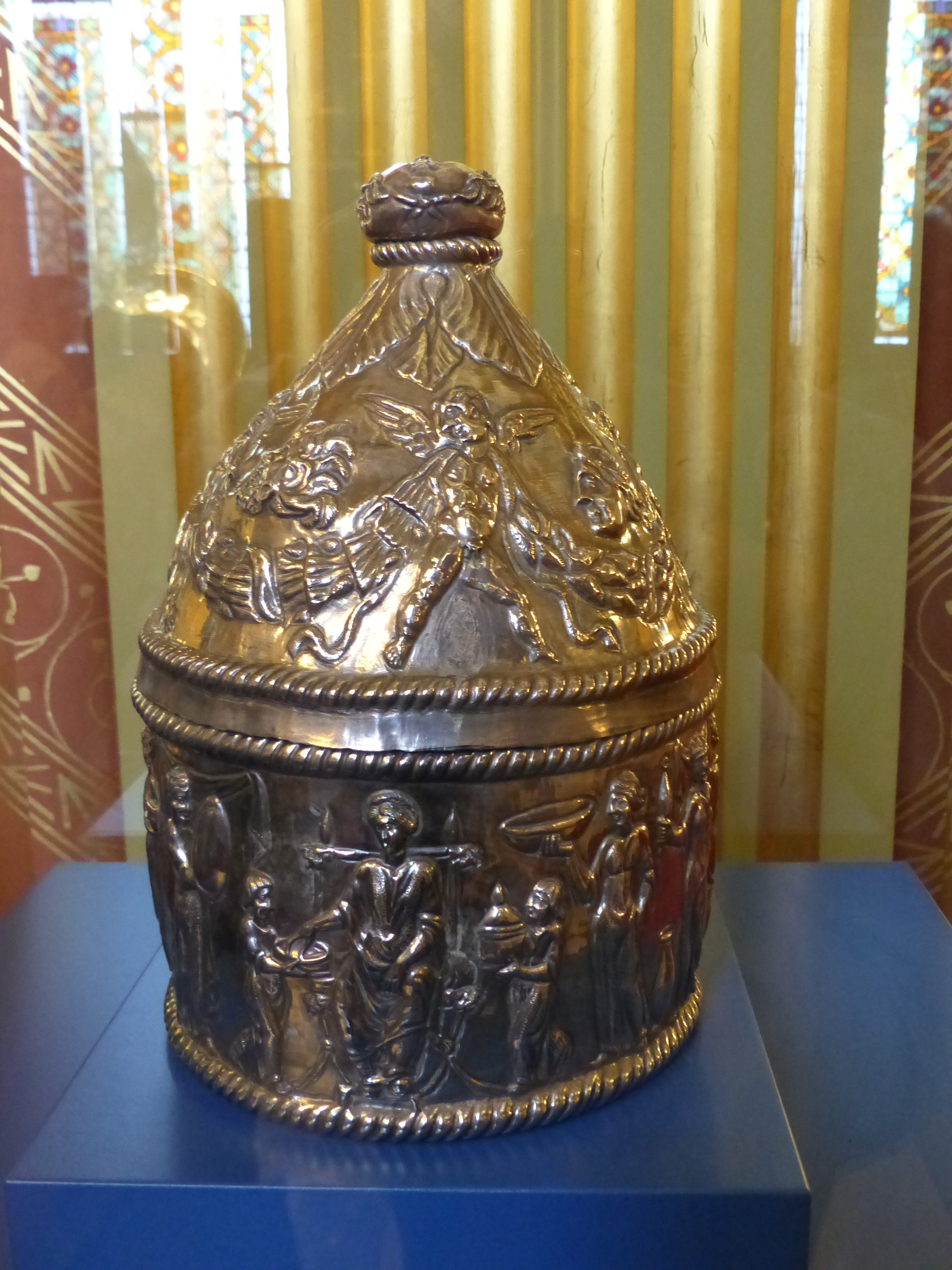
Perfume box

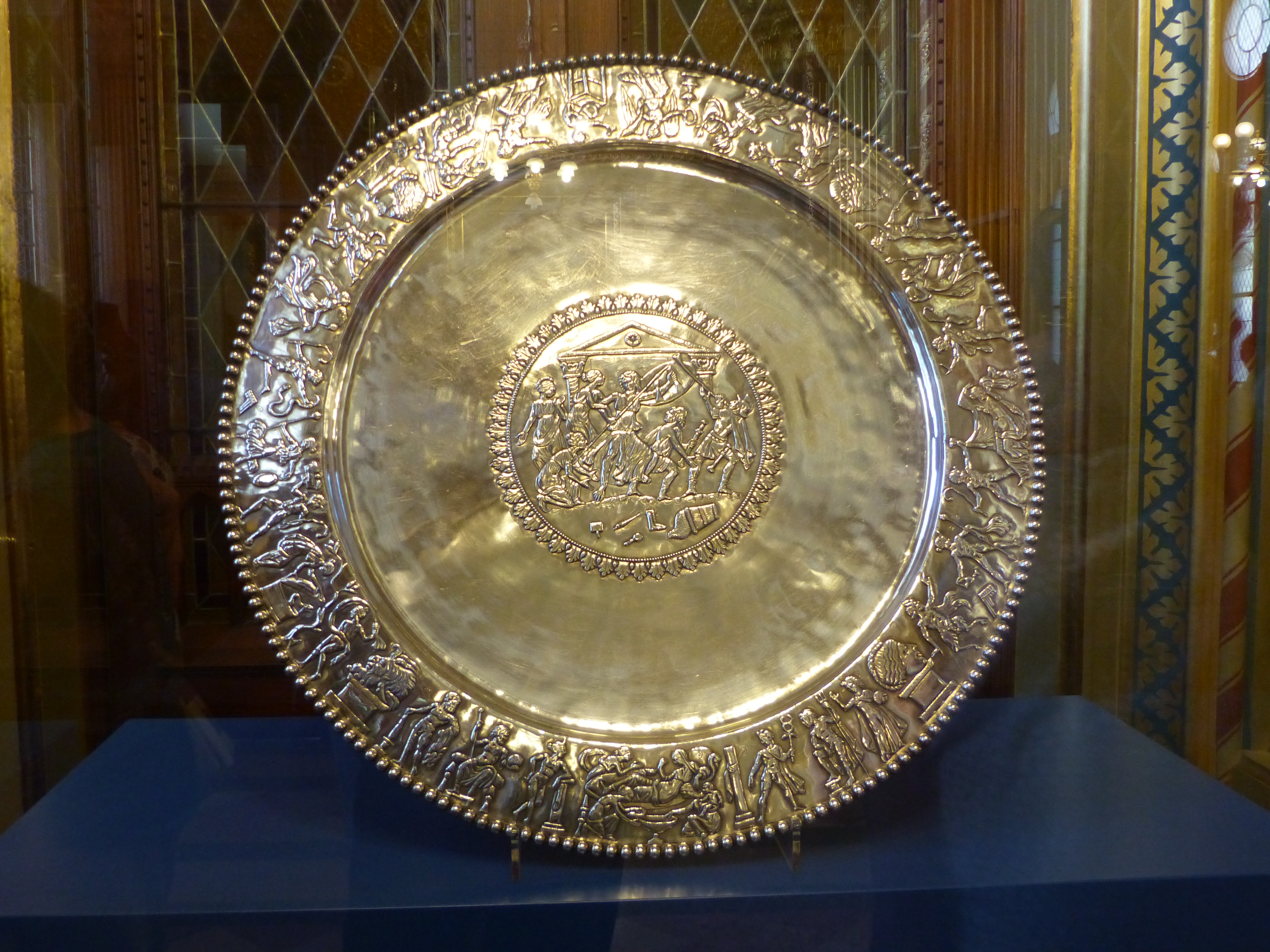
Achilles plate

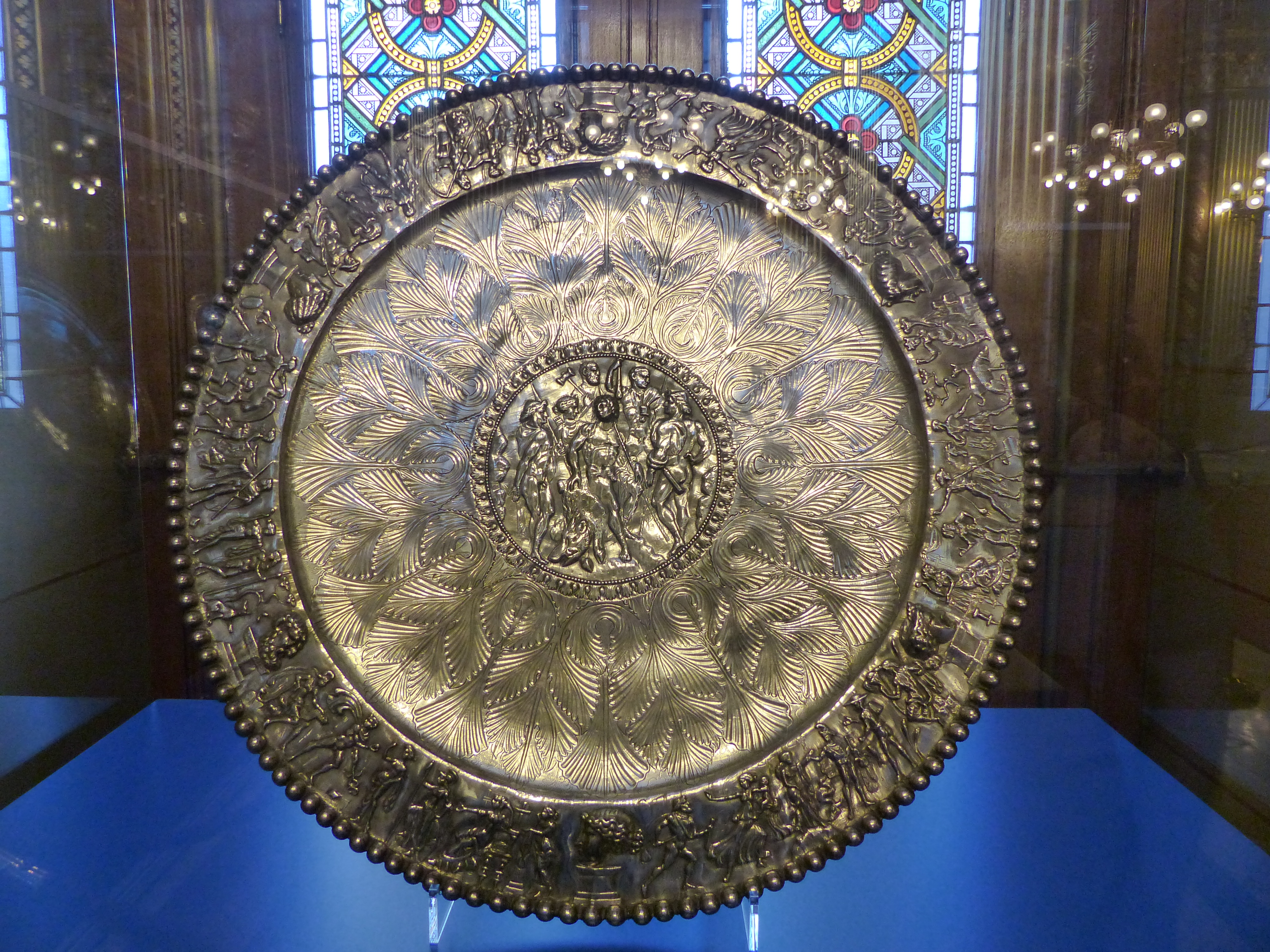
Meleager plate

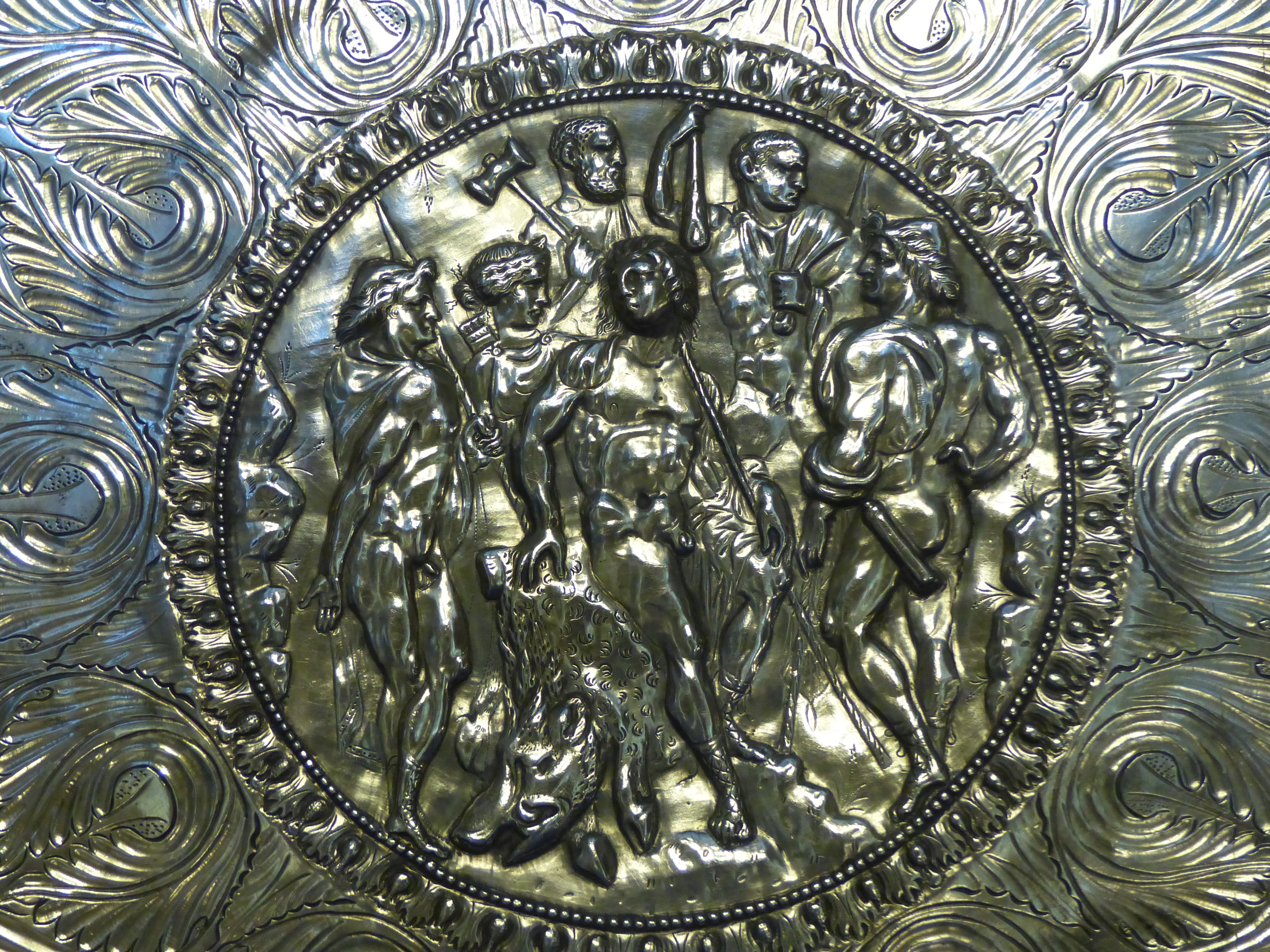
Meleager plate (detail)

== Sources ==
- Antiques Trade Gazette, 30 September 2006
- Ruth E. Leader-Newby — Silver and Society in Late Antiquity: Functions and Meanings of Silver Plate in the Fourth to Seventh Centuries
- Marlia Mundell Mango and Anna Bennett — "The Sevso Treasure" in Journal of Roman Archaeology Suppl. 12:1, 1994.
