= Survivor (franchise) =

Reality television franchise

- The International Survivor logo - Logos of most editions of Survivor are adapted from this logo (with the torch in place of an "i").
- Created by: Charlie Parsons, Waheed Alli, Baron Alli and Planet 24
- Original work: Expedition Robinson (Sweden)
- Owner: Banijay Entertainment
- Years: 1997–present

Survivor is a reality competition television franchise produced globally. The show features a group of contestants deliberately marooned in an isolated location, where they must provide basic survival necessities for themselves. The contestants compete in challenges for rewards and immunity from elimination. The contestants are progressively eliminated from the game as they are voted out by their fellow contestants until only one remains to be awarded the grand prize and named the "Sole Survivor".

The British television producer Charlie Parsons developed the format for Survivor in 1992 for Planet 24, a United Kingdom television production company; the Swedish version, which debuted in September 1997 as Expedition Robinson, became the first Survivor series to be broadcast on television. Since its launch in 2000, the flagship American version of Survivor has aired 50 seasons of the show, with 50th season, commemorating the show's 25th anniversary, airing in early 2026.

== Format ==
Survivor, through its seasons and various international versions, has maintained the basic premise of the game despite several new rules and gameplay twists introduced in later seasons. In the game, the contestants, known as castaways, are split into tribes and assigned separate camps at the filming location, typically a tropical setting. As a tribe, the castaways must survive the elements, construct shelter, build fire, look for water, and scrounge for food and other necessities for the entire length of the game, which is generally around 39 days for most versions including the American version, but has ranged from 20 days (as in some French special seasons) to over 150 days (as in some seasons of the Turkish edition). In the first half of the game, the tribes face off in challenges, some for rewards of food, shelter, or luxury items, while others are for immunity, preventing the winning tribe from having to go to the next Tribal Council. At Tribal Council, the tribes discuss the events of the last few days with the host asking questions, and then vote out one of their own players, eliminating them from the game.

In the second half of the game, the tribes are merged into a single tribe, and challenges are played at an individual level for individual rewards and immunity. At subsequent Tribal Councils, those eliminated start to form the jury, who sit in on all subsequent Tribal Councils but otherwise do not participate. When only two or three castaways remain, those castaways attend the Final Tribal Council, where the jury is given the opportunity to ask them questions. After this, the jury members then vote to decide which of the remaining castaways should be declared the Sole Survivor and be awarded the grand prize.

Episodes typically cover the events that occurred over two to three days since the start of the game or previous Tribal Council, including Challenges and events that occur at the tribes' camps. Each episode typically ends with the Tribal Council and the subsequent elimination of the voted-out player. The final episode will typically speed up the gameplay of the final couple of eliminations (which occur daily), followed by the Final Tribal Council on the final day of the completion. Many versions of the show will follow the final episode with a live reunion, during which the votes from the Jury are counted, and a "Sole Survivor" is declared, and the players reunite to discuss their experience on the island.

The following description of the show is based primarily on the American version of Survivor, though the general format applies to all international versions.

=== Castaways and tribes ===
The tribe camp near the end of Survivor: Borneo. Tribes must build themselves basic shelters from natural resources and through reward items earned during the competition.

Players for each season are selected through applicants and casting calls, down-selecting to between 16 and 20 players (even up to 24 on special occasions) and additional alternates. American version host Jeff Probst noted that while 16 castaways assist in splitting the tribes with respect to age and sex, they have used 18 or 20 to provide them "wiggle room" in case of player injury or if one should want to quit the game. These players undergo physical and psychological evaluation to make sure they are physically and mentally fit for the survival endurance and will not likely quit during the filming period, replacing those that are questionable with the alternates. In one case, Fiji, on the day before filming was to start after they had dismissed their alternates, one of the castaways opted out of the competition, forcing production to start with 19 players and adapting the activities of the first few days to accommodate the odd number of players.

Tribes may be predetermined by production before filming starts. Often this is done to equalize the sexes and age ranges within both tribes. Other seasons have had the tribes separated by age, gender, race or other characteristics. In other cases, the tribes may be created by the castaways through schoolyard picks. Most often, only two tribes are featured, but some seasons have begun with three or four tribes. Once assigned a tribe, each castaway is given a buff in their tribe color to aid the viewers in identifying tribal allocation. Tribes are then subsequently given names, often inspired by the local region and culture, and directions to their camps.

At their camps, tribes are expected to build a shelter against the elements from the local trees and other resources. Tribes are typically given minimal resources, such as a machete, water canteens, cooking pots, and staples of rice and grains, though this varies from season to season. Sometimes, tribes are provided with a water well near the camp, but require the water to be boiled to make it potable, necessitating the need for the tribe to build a fire. The tribes are encouraged to forage off the land for food, including fruits, wild animals, and fish.

== Tribe swaps ==
In some seasons, tribe swaps occur where one or more players shift from one tribe to another. These new tribal designations are often determined by random draw or schoolyard pick. When these occur, those players that shift tribes are given new buffs for their new tribe and return to that tribe's camp, with any personal possessions from their former camp moved with them. In seasons with more than two tribes, tribe swaps often reduce the number of tribes to two. In Survivor: Cambodia, a tribe swap increased the number of tribes from two to three; a second tribe swap later in the season reduced the number of tribes back to two.

Tribes that have lost too many members may be absorbed by the other remaining tribes, as seen with the Ulong tribe in Survivor: Palau and the Matsing tribe of Survivor: Philippines; in the former case, the lone remaining Ulong member joined the opposing Koror tribe and the tribes were treated as if they were merged, whereas in the later case the two remaining Matsing members were randomly assigned to the two remaining tribes. Alternatively, in Survivor: All-Stars, the tribe that placed third in a designated challenge was disbanded, with the members reallocated to the other two tribes by schoolyard pick.

=== Tribal merge ===
At a point in or around the middle of the game, the remaining tribes are merged into one. All of the players then live in a single camp and are given new buffs and instructed to select a new tribe name and paint a tribe flag. The merge is often signified with a feast. Though the merge often occurs when approximately 10 to 12 players remain, the tribes have been merged with as many as 17 players (as in Survivor 50: In the Hands of the Fans) and as few as eight (as in Survivor: Thailand).

=== Challenges ===
Tribes compete frequently in both mental and physical challenges to win rewards or immunity, such as this race to pull cannons during the first episode of Survivor: Pearl Islands.

During both pre- and post-merge parts of the game, the castaways compete in a series of challenges. Tribes are alerted to these upcoming challenges by a message, often in rhyme, delivered to camp by the production team at a basket or box on a nearby tree; this message has come to be called "treemail", playing off the word "e-mail". The message typically hints at what the challenge might be. The message may also provide props to demonstrate this, practice equipment for the players, or a sampling of the reward. Challenges can last from a few minutes to a couple of hours. The longest Survivor challenge was 11 hours and 55 minutes in the final immunity challenge in Survivor: Palau.

=== Tribal challenges ===
Prior to the merge, tribes compete against each other in challenges. These most often are multi-segment obstacle courses that include both physical and mental elements with the tribe that finishes first declared the winner; commonly, these start with tribe members collecting puzzle pieces that are then used to solve a puzzle by other tribe members. Other challenges may be based on winning a number of rounds of head-to-head competitions. Challenges are normally held with equal numbers of all tribes participating and in some cases equal splits of gender. Tribes with more players will be asked to sit out as many players as needed to balance the numbers, with the stipulation that those players cannot sit out in back-to-back reward and immunity challenges. When one tribe has more than twice the other tribe members, then players in the larger tribe cannot participate in back-to-back challenges. Tribes are given time to strategically decide who should sit out and who will perform the various duties on a challenge.

==== Individual challenges ====
After the merge, challenges are generally performed on an individual basis. These include similar obstacle courses as for team challenges, but will often also include endurance challenges, having players maintain the balance under precarious situations for as long as possible, with the last player remaining winning the challenge. In some cases, during post-merge challenges, the individuals will be split into separate teams, with only the winning team eligible for reward or immunity.

==== Types of challenges ====
Challenges can be played for rewards, immunity, or both. Rewards include food, survival equipment like flint, tarps, or fishing gear, luxury items, and short getaways from camp. Before the merge, the entire winning tribe will enjoy these rewards. Post-merge, only one player may win the reward but will be given the opportunity to select one or more other players to bring along with them on it. Individual challenge rewards may also include an advantage that can be used at the subsequent immunity challenge, such as advancing directly into the final round of the challenge without having to participate in the first round.

Immunity challenges provide the winning tribe or team with immunity from Tribal Council. Immunity is usually represented in a form of an idol prior to the merge, and a necklace afterwards. Prior to the merge, tribes with immunity do not attend Tribal Council, allowing them to stay intact. In seasons featuring more than two tribes, immunity will be available for all but the last place finishers, forcing this one tribe to Tribal Council. With individual immunity, those castaways still attend Tribal Council with the rest of the merged tribe, but, unless they assign immunity to someone else, are ineligible to be voted for. Winning immunity is only good for one Tribal Council; at the next immunity challenge, the tribe or castaway will be asked to give up the idol or necklace, making immunity "up for grabs". There have been a few cases in which individual immunity challenges have taken place prior to the merge whereupon usually, one castaway in each tribe will be given immunity, after which both tribes will attend Tribal Council, one after the other. This is used to quickly dwindle the number of remaining castaways.

Though a wide variety of challenges have been used across the Survivor's broadcast, several challenges are frequently reused:

- A food eating challenge, involving food items that may be local delicacies but are considered gross or revolting by the castaways. These were more often seen in earlier seasons but in recent years have become much less frequent.
- A trivia or "know your tribe" quiz, where castaways who provide correct answers are allowed to knock other castaways out of the challenge and prevent them from winning.
- A "Survivor Auction", used in place of a reward challenge, in which the players are given a sum of money to use to bid on food items (both known and unknown at the time of bidding), other momentary luxuries like a bath, or advantages in the game, such as a clue to a hidden immunity idol or an advantage in the upcoming immunity challenge.
- A "loved ones" challenge, where a spouse, parent, sibling, adult child or friend of each castaway has been flown out to the location to participate in the challenge with or for their castaway. The winner typically gets to spend more time with their loved one, either on a brief trip or back at camp.
- A "second chance" challenge, where elements of previous challenges are reused in a single course.
- The final immunity challenge is often a long-lasting endurance challenge, giving the remaining castaways time to make bargains and last-minute deals to get into the final Tribal Council.

=== Tribal Council ===
Tribal Council is a special production stage located near the tribe camps. Tribes sit across a fire pit from the host while the jury members, if present, sit off to the side. A small alcove adjoins the structure for the players to cast their votes in private. Tribal Council almost always serves as an episode's finale.

The first time each player attends Tribal Council, he or she takes a torch and lights it from the fire pit while the host reminds them "fire represents life in this game". During the jury phase of the game, the host will call in the jury after the tribe is seated and remind jurors they are there to gather information but not speak or otherwise participate. The host will then proceed to ask the tribe questions about what has transpired since their last visit to Tribal Council (or the beginning of the game). The host asks these questions in hopes of bringing tribal dynamics to light, and players in precarious situations may reveal information or bargain with others to keep themselves in the game. Though the viewing audience typically sees only a few minutes of each Tribal Council, some have gone on for hours.

The host ends the formal discussion by declaring that it is time to vote. During the second half of the game, the host then gives the immunity challenge winner(s) the choice to keep their immunity necklace for themselves or give it to another player, then reminds players they cannot cast a vote for the player(s) who finally end up wearing the necklace(s). The host then directs the players to vote in the alcove one-by-one. After writing their vote, each player has the opportunity to address the camera before placing their vote in the ballot urn. Once all players have cast their votes, the host collects the urn, tallies the votes, and returns to the fire pit with the urn. Beginning from Survivor: Fiji, the host then offers players the opportunity to play an immunity idol prior to announcing the votes. If a player produces an idol, he or she must declare which player the idol protects (typically a player can protect anyone, including themselves). The host then confirms if the idol is legitimate, and if it is, the host declares that any vote for the protected player will not count. The host then reminds the tribe that once the votes are read, the decision is final, and the eliminated player must leave the Tribal Council area immediately.

When enough votes have been read to eliminate one player, any additional votes remain unread and unknown to the players (in almost all cases, the leftover votes are also for the eliminated player). The host instructs the eliminated player to bring their torch, snuffs it out, and tells the player that "the tribe has spoken" (or in rare cases, a fitting variation thereof) and "it's time for you to go." As the eliminated player walks off, the host makes a final observation before telling the remainder of the tribe to "grab your torches and head back to camp" and wishes them a good night. Occasionally, tribes who have not made fire on their own or earned it in a challenge will have to douse their torches or leave the torches at Tribal Council.

The eliminated player has a final confessional to express their feelings about being eliminated before they are sequestered with other eliminated players until the end of filming. Later eliminated players join the jury who will decide the winner. Jurors are sequestered until the end of the Final Tribal Council. While sequestered, jurors cannot discuss their jury vote or experiences with other jurors to prevent any possible cooperation or collusion from subgroups within the jury. After casting their vote at Final Tribal Council, jurors also cannot discuss their vote with anyone lest they spoil the surprise reveal at the season finale.

Ties occasionally occur. Normally, the players vote a second time with only the tied players eligible for elimination. If this second vote does not break the tie, various tiebreakers have broken the stalemates. These tiebreakers have changed throughout the seasons. In Survivor: The Australian Outback and Survivor: Africa, stalemates were broken by eliminating the player with the highest number of previous votes cast against them. If the players had the same number of previous votes cast against them, as seen in Africa, the tie was resolved by a sudden-death challenge (in this case a trivia quiz about nature), with the loser eliminated. This soon led to alliances choosing a player to eliminate based on their vote history over other relevant factors. To put all players on even ground in subsequent seasons, the non-tied voters have several minutes to deliberate and must come to a unanimous decision about which tied castaway to eliminate. If they succeed, their chosen castaway is eliminated; if they do not, all non-immune deliberators draw concealed rocks from a bag, and the castaway who draws the odd-colored rock is eliminated. This encourages players to change their votes to avoid a stalemate and punishes deliberators for stalemating. The rock-draw tiebreaker has occurred three times: in Survivor: Marquesas, Survivor: Blood vs. Water, and Survivor: Millennials vs. Gen X. In Survivor: Marquesas, the rock draw occurred with four players remaining, and the tied castaways were both involved in the deliberation and eligible for elimination; host Jeff Probst later revealed that this was a mistake and that this tiebreaker should only be used when six or more players are involved. Following Survivor: Marquesas, all stalemates with four remaining players have been resolved by a fire-making duel where the first tied castaway to build a small fire high enough to burn through a rope remained in the game. The fire-making tiebreaker was also used in Survivor: Palau at a Tribal Council where the losing tribe had only two members remaining.

==== Final Tribal Council ====
When only two—or, in later seasons, three—players remain in the game, the finalists and jurors convene for Final Tribal Council. The change to three finalists presents more of a challenge to the castaway who wins the final immunity challenge: while that person has clinched their spot as a finalist, they cannot unilaterally decide which of the other remaining castaways they will compete against for jurors' votes.

At Final Tribal Council, each remaining castaway makes an opening statement to the jury. One-by-one, each juror then addresses any or all of the finalists, asking questions or commenting on the finalists' behavior in the game. Jurors often ask questions hoping for answers that will help make their decision, while comments and speeches are generally an effort to sway other jurors. The finalists are usually free to respond to these questions and comments as they see fit, though jurors can expressly forbid them to respond. Beginning with Survivor: Game Changers in the U.S., the process shifted from each juror receiving the floor one-by-one toward a moderated discussion highlighting the show's three major tentpoles: "Outwit", "Outplay" and "Outlast". After the interrogation, finalists often have one last chance to make their case. The host then reminds the jurors that they are writing their choice to win (versus writing their choice to eliminate, as in all other votes) and, for the last time, declares that it is time to vote. One-by-one, jurors vote privately in the alcove. As with regular elimination votes, jurors can choose to address the camera to explain their vote. The host then collects the urn, and in most seasons, leaves the votes unread until a live finale months later, at the conclusion of the season's broadcast, where they read the votes publicly and crown the Sole Survivor.

Since the 41st season of the American version of the show, the structure of Final Tribal Council has been permanently changed. When the votes are cast now, Jeff Probst simply reads off the votes and announces on the spot who won the game. The reunion show also now takes place immediately after this vote at the FTC site, with all of the contestants sitting and talking over the season with themselves and Jeff.

At the finale of Survivor: Micronesia, the only season to date with two finalists and eight jurors, host Jeff Probst reportedly had a white envelope containing the tiebreaker, but the exact nature of this tiebreaker is not known publicly, as a tie did not occur. This contingency plan was also in place for three-way ties involving three finalists and nine jurors. At the Survivor: Game Changers reunion, Probst revealed that a two-way tie in a final three would be broken with the third-place finisher casting the deciding vote. This first happened in Survivor: Ghost Island when Wendell Holland and Domenick Abbate each received 5 votes to win. Laurel Johnson, the third-place finisher, became the 11th and final juror and cast the deciding vote.

In the French series, ties between two finalists are resolved by crowning them co-winners, as seen in their third, seventh and twenty-third seasons.

==== Evacuation and quitting ====
Some players have been eliminated from the game by other means than being voted out. Castaways who suffer severe injuries or exhaustion are evaluated by the medical team which is always on call. The medical team may provide treatment and give the player the option to continue in the game, warning them of the health risks involved. However, if the medical doctor determines that the player is at risk of permanent injury or death and needs to be removed from the game for their own health, they will be removed and taken to a nearby hospital. In Survivor: Cambodia, the producers were notified that one of the remaining castaways' children had been hospitalized, and the castaway was pulled from the game to return home and be with their family. Survivor: Kaôh Rōng has had the most evacuations to date, with three.

Occasionally, castaways who are not in need of medical treatment have decided to quit the game, without waiting to be voted out, due to physical or emotional exhaustion—either by making an announcement at a Tribal Council, in which case they are let out of the game without any vote, or by being recovered from camp after making their intentions clear to producers and being interviewed by the host. When a player leaves the game without being voted off, the other tribes are notified of the departed player's removal, and the next Tribal Council may be cancelled. After the players merge into one tribe, any who have been removed from the game by medical evacuation are still eligible to participate as jury members once the medical examiners deem them healthy enough to do so. Those that have quit the game voluntarily may also still be eligible for the jury and, if their reasons for leaving are considered sufficient, they may also still be allowed to make a farewell speech to the camera.

=== Hidden immunity idols ===
Hidden immunity idols are pocket-sized ornaments—typically necklaces—made to fit the theme of the season, that are hidden around the tribes' camps or other locations that the castaways have access to. When played at Tribal Council, the hidden immunity idol makes the castaway who plays it immune from elimination at that Tribal Council. Idols are typically usable until the Tribal Council with five players remaining, and do not need to be declared to other castaways when found. The idol, once found by a player, cannot be stolen from them, but other castaways can look through their possessions to see if they have it. Idols can, however, be transferred to other players at any point, or be played on another player at Tribal Council. Once an idol "leaves the game", either by being played or by the holder leaving the game with their idol, a replacement idol may be hidden.

First seen in Survivor: Guatemala, several seasons have used different iterations of the idol:

- An idol that can be played before the votes are cast, thus preventing all other players from voting against the player who cast it (As seen in Guatemala)
- An idol that can be played after the votes are read, thus negating all votes against the player who cast it and eliminating the castaway with the next-highest vote total (As seen in Panama and Cook Islands. Also seen in Cagayan, Kaôh Rōng and Heroes v Healers v Hustlers as the "Super Idol")
- An idol that can be played after the votes are cast but before they are read, thus negating all votes against the player who cast it and eliminating the castaway with the next-highest vote total (As seen in all seasons from Fiji onward)

The third type of idol is seen as a "happy medium" relative to the two previous versions, and forces both the voters and the idol holder to make a more complicated strategic decision: the voters may have to vote without knowing whether the person they are voting for has a hidden immunity idol or without knowing whether that person will choose to play it, and the person with the idol must decide whether to play it without knowing whether enough votes have been cast to vote them out of the game. This type of idol may be "wasted" if a player uses it and does not receive the highest number of votes, and other times idol holders may choose not to use the idol, intending to save it to use at a later time, but will be eliminated with their idol unplayed. Though this third idol continues to be used, two seasons have used the two latter forms of idols concurrently: in Cagayan, clues were given to the third type of idol, but an idol with the second power was hidden with no clues; this idol could not be transferred. In Kaôh Rōng, all hidden idols were of the third type, but two idols could be combined into a single idol of the second type, referred to as a "super idol".

Strategically, castaways have used the idol as a bargaining chip to align other players with them and swing pending votes in a specific direction; as a result, some players have been inspired to create fake hidden immunity idols, either leaving them the spot that the original idol was found (most commonly), or carrying them around as a bluff to attempt to alter people's voting strategies in advance of Tribal Council. If a fake idol is played at Tribal Council, the host notes that it is not a hidden immunity idol and throws it in the fire. In the American version of the show, the producers have encouraged players to make fake idols by providing decorative materials—such as beads, string, and paint—through props within the game. In Cambodia, all idols were deliberately made to look different from each other to further encourage castaways to make fake idols.

To help castaways find the idol, a series of clues are given to them in succession in a number of different ways. A clue may be given to the winner of a reward challenge, hidden among the reward prizes, announced by the host to all remaining castaways, or provided to a castaway who has been sent to Exile Island or temporarily sent to live with the other tribe. Castaways are under no obligation to share the idol clues with other players. Clues continue to be provided even after a player has secretly found the idol. Each successive clue includes all the previous clues given for that location. Only once a new idol is hidden are new clues provided to the players. In later seasons, players have been very aware that hidden idols may be in play from the start of the game and some have started to look for them near apparent landmarks before any clues have been provided. One castaway, Russell Hantz, was able to find two idols during Survivor: Samoa without the aid of clues. In light of this so-called "Russell factor," producers subsequently began hiding the idols in more difficult-to-find locations, and, in Survivor: Nicaragua, clues contained a rebus puzzle rather than text, though this did not carry into the next season or beyond.

=== Exile Island ===
Exile Island is a remote location away from the tribal camps, where one or two castaways are sent to live in isolation from the rest of their tribe. Exile Island was first introduced in Survivor: Palau when a single contestant was made to stay alone on a beach for a day as a result of being the first to drop out of an Immunity Challenge. This twist was not used regularly until Survivor: Panama; it was also used in Cook Islands, Fiji, Micronesia, Gabon, Tocantins, San Juan del Sur, and In the Hands of the Fans. The first contestant to send themself to Exile Island was Yau-Man Chan.

A selected player is exiled to a location (typically a small island) apart from the main tribe camps. Typically, the castaway is exiled after the reward challenge, leaving the challenge location for Exile Island, and usually returns immediately before the following immunity challenge. The exiled castaway is chosen as a result of the reward challenge: in the tribal phase, a member of the losing tribe is exiled (usually exiled by the winning tribe), while in the individual phase, the reward challenge winner holds the sole right to choose. Unless stated otherwise, players who win the right to decide who goes to Exile Island may also choose to go themselves. In Micronesia, Tocantins, and San Juan del Sur, one person from each tribe was sent to Exile Island. In several seasons with Exile Island, there were tribe swaps with an uneven number of castaways remaining, as in Panama, Fiji, Gabon, David vs. Goliath; the leftover contestant was treated as "tribeless" and exiled immediately after formation. In this case, the contestant was immune until following the next Tribal Council, joining the tribe that lost the next immunity challenge.

Once selected, the exiled contestant is immediately sent there. They are given minimal survival tools, typically a water canteen, a machete, a pot, and a limited amount of shelter. The two main disadvantages of being on Exile Island are the lack of food and water, which can weaken a player and make them less effective in challenges, and the isolation from other contestants, which can cause a player to become out of the loop and weaken their position in their tribe. Contestants are often sent to Exile Island for one or both of these strategic reasons.

In certain seasons, exiled castaways receive a consolation prize: in all seasons with Exile Island, the exiled castaway receives a clue to the hidden immunity idol (or the idol nullifier on David vs Goliath.), which may or may not be located on the island. On Survivor: Gabon, the exiled castaway was given the option to give up their idol clue for "instant comfort," and in Survivor: Tocantins, the exiled castaway had the right to change tribes. Occasionally the exiled castaway is instructed to return after the next Tribal Council, earning them automatic immunity.

==== Other exile twists ====
Two seasons of the American version have used different variations on the Exile twists. In China, tribes who won reward challenges earned the right to "kidnap" a member of the losing tribe, who would stay with them until the next immunity challenge. The kidnapped person was given a clue to the hidden immunity idol which he or she must give to one member of the winning tribe. In Samoa a reverse version of the kidnapping rule was used, called "spy expedition" (also known as "observing"). The winning tribe had to send one of their own to accompany the other tribe until the immunity challenge. Both of these twists were retired after the merge. In Kaôh Rōng, the three tribes were shuffled into two tribes with 13 players remaining; the leftover castaway, Julia Solowski, was exiled to the now-defunct third camp and joined the tribe that lost the next immunity challenge the day after their Tribal Council. In Game Changers, the tribes switched with 15 players remaining, with Debbie being exiled for not being put on a tribe. Unlike other visitors to Exile Island, Debbie was sent to a luxury yacht. This was not revealed to the other players and was only referred to as Exile Island.

The 36th season of the American version introduced the titular Ghost Island, which was similar to Exile Island but featured mementos and props from previous seasons of Survivor, including several misplayed advantages. Banished castaways were given the opportunity to acquire these advantages in a game of chance where they could either win the advantage or lose their vote at their next Tribal Council (represented as a parchment stating "No Vote"). However, not every episode has advantages given out at Ghost Island.

=== Redemption Island ===
Redemption Island is a twist used in Survivor: Redemption Island, Survivor: South Pacific and Survivor: Blood vs. Water, in which voted out contestants remain in the game, exiled from the other castaways, competing in challenges for a chance to return to the game. It was first used in several international editions, including the Swedish version, the Israeli version as "The Island of the Dead", Philippine version's second season as "Isla Purgatoryo" (Purgatory Island), the Serbian version's second season as "Ghost Island" and the Romanian version's first season as "Exile Island".

After being voted out, contestants are exiled to Redemption Island, where they will fend for themselves like the castaways in the game proper until the next person is voted out. The day following Tribal Council, there is a duel in which the winner remains on the island and the losers are eliminated for good; upon elimination, the duel losers must remove their buff and throw it into a small fire pit. There are two places where the winner of the duel returns to the game: at the merge, where Redemption Island is cleared and reset; and when there are four players remaining in the main game, at which point Redemption Island is retired.

Double elimination cycles, or any other disruption of the game's pattern, leads to three or four duelists instead of two. In Survivor: Redemption Island only the loser of the duel was eliminated, resulting in four players competing in the final duel due to two double elimination cycles, with two Tribal Councils and no duels in between. For Survivor: South Pacific, the rules were changed so only the winner remained in the game while all others were eliminated. In Survivor: Blood vs. Water, there were three competitors at every duel, with only one player eliminated at each duel except for ones in which a sole winner returned to the main game.

Redemption Island in Blood vs. Water featured additional alterations to fit with the game's primary twist of featuring pairs of loved ones. Prior to any duel, the castaways with loved ones on Redemption Island are given the choice to replace their loved one on Redemption Island, with their loved one returning to the main game and taking their place in the tribe. In addition, the first-place winner of the duel must give a clue to a hidden immunity idol to any castaway in the main game.

A short-term variation of the Redemption Island twist is used on Australian Survivor - most notably, where at Tribal Council, the castaways are informed that the next two players voted-off (the castaway voted for that night and at the following Tribal Council) will not be eliminated from the game, but rather they will be Exiled. In Exile, the two castaways will compete in a duel with the winner returning to the tribe and remaining in the game, and the loser being officially eliminated. This twist was used in Australian Survivor: Champions V Contenders,Australian Survivor: Champions V Contenders II and Australian Survivor: Brains V Brawn. Another variation during a Double Tribal Council was used during Australian Survivor: All Stars and Australian Survivor: Blood V Water - during a Double Tribal Council, both tribes voted out a player. These players would then compete in a Fire Making Duel. The winner returns to the tribe, and the loser is eliminated. A minor variation of this twist was used on Australian Survivor: Brains V Brawn in which the fate of the two voted out players would be decided by the players who won an earlier immunity challenge. Yet another variation of the Exile Twist was used during the Australian Survivor: All Stars – in which 3 players were voted out in 2 Tribal Councils – the 6 players would compete in 2 challenges to return to the game – the 3 who remained would face a Tribal Council vote to determine who is eliminated.

Other seasons have featured alternate twists in which voted-out players can return to the game. In 2003, Survivor: Pearl Islands featured the Outcast twist, in which the six eliminated castaways competed as the Outcast tribe against the two remaining tribes; as the Outcast tribe won the challenge, they earned the right to vote two of their own back into the game, while the other two tribes had to vote players out; following this, the tribes merged. In the seventh season of the Israeli version, voted out players remained in the game as "zombies", challenging their former tribemates to stay in the game and vote in their stead at Tribal Council; similar to Redemption Island, zombies returned to the game at the merge and near the end of the game. The 2019 season Survivor: Edge of Extinction allowed eliminated players the decision of either leaving the game, or going to the titular island. Once there, the contestants survived on fewer supplies than were available in the main game, but had the option to quit at any time. The players on the island competed in an individual challenge at the merge, and with five players remaining, with the winner returning to the main game. This twist returned two seasons later for Survivor: Winners at War.

=== Prizes ===
The Sole Survivor receives a cash prize of $1,000,000 prior to taxes and sometimes also receives a car provided by the show's sponsor. Every player receives a prize for participating on Survivor depending on how long they last in the game. In most seasons, the runner-up receives $100,000, and third place wins $85,000. All other players receive money on a sliding scale, though specific amounts have rarely been made public. Sonja Christopher, the first player voted off Survivor: Borneo, received $2,500. In Survivor: Fiji, the first season with tied runners-up, the two runners-up received $100,000 each, and Yau-Man Chan received $60,000 for his fourth-place finish. All players also receive an additional $10,000 for their appearance on the reunion show. In the 40th season of the American version (an all winners edition), winner Tony Vlachos received $2,000,000. This monetary prize was matched in Survivor 50: In the Hands of the Fans, as a result of a game advantage. The show also awarded a car as part of the prize during the finale. With this car, the prize for In the Hands of the Fans became the largest grand prize awarded to a Survivor winner, which went to Aubry Bracco.

==== Reward Challenge vehicles won ====
Most seasons between The Australian Outback and Fiji have featured a late-season reward challenge where the winner receives a car. This reward was infamous for what was later dubbed the "car curse," referring to the fact that no player who won the car ever went on to win the game during his, her or their original season.

- In Survivor: The Australian Outback, Colby Donaldson won a Pontiac Aztek.
- In Survivor: Africa, Lex van den Berghe won a Chevrolet Avalanche.
- In Survivor: Marquesas, Sean Rector won a Saturn VUE.
- In Survivor: Thailand, Ted Rogers won a Chevrolet TrailBlazer.
- In Survivor: The Amazon, Matthew von Ertfelda won a Saturn Ion.
- In Survivor: Pearl Islands, Burton Roberts won a GMC Envoy XUV.
- In Survivor: All-Stars, Rob Mariano won a Chevrolet Colorado. In addition, Rob was allowed to bring another contestant with him on a trip; he chose Amber Brkich, who received a Chevrolet Malibu as a result.
- In Survivor: Vanuatu, Eliza Orlins won a Pontiac G6.
- In Survivor: Palau, Ian Rosenberger won a Chevrolet Corvette.
- In Survivor: Guatemala, Cindy Hall won a 2006 Pontiac Torrent; she was given the option to relinquish her reward to give the other remaining players each a car, but declined.
- In Survivor: Panama, Terry Deitz won a GMC Yukon.
- In Survivor: Fiji, Yau-Man Chan won a 2008 Ford Super Duty but gave it to fellow contestant Andria "Dreamz" Herd as part of a strategic deal. Herd would renege on the deal and neither won.

Other prizes are given out post-game, usually at the live reunion that immediately follows the coronation of the winner.

- At the Survivor: All-Stars reunion, Amber Brkich, as the Sole Survivor, was asked to select one of her fellow contestants to receive a car; she selected Shii Ann Huang.
- In Survivor: America's Tribal Council following the All-Stars finale, Rupert Boneham was selected by a popularity poll of Survivor viewers to win $1,000,000.
- For two seasons, viewers of Survivor voted their favorite player to win a new car.
  - Survivor: Panama: Cirie Fields won a GMC Yukon
  - Survivor: Cook Islands: Ozzy Lusth won a Mercury Mariner
- At the Survivor: China reunion, series creator Mark Burnett awarded Denise Martin $50,000 to help her out financially, but this gift was later donated to charity.
- From Survivor: China to Survivor: Caramoan, viewers of the show voted their favorite player to win $100,000 as the Sprint Player of the Season.
  - Survivor: China: James Clement
  - Survivor: Micronesia: James Clement
  - Survivor: Gabon: Robert "Bob" Crowley
  - Survivor: Tocantins: James "J.T." Thomas Jr.
  - Survivor: Samoa: Russell Hantz
  - Survivor: Heroes vs. Villains: Russell Hantz
  - Survivor: Nicaragua: Jane Bright
  - Survivor: Redemption Island: Rob Mariano
  - Survivor: South Pacific: Ozzy Lusth
  - Survivor: One World: Kim Spradlin
  - Survivor: Philippines: Lisa Whelchel
  - Survivor: Caramoan: Malcolm Freberg
- Beginning with Survivor: Kaôh Rōng, pop singer Sia has personally given select castaways a monetary gift, also known as the Sia Award, at irregular intervals.
  - Survivor: Kaôh Rōng: Tai Trang received $50,000 for himself, plus an additional $50,000 was donated to a charity of his choosing.
  - Survivor: Ghost Island: Donathan Hurley received $10,000, which Sia later upgraded to $14,000.
  - Survivor: David vs. Goliath: Davie Rickenbacker received $14,000.
  - Survivor: Edge of Extinction: Rick Devens received $100,000. Aurora McCreary received $15,000 and Joe Anglim received $15,000 for cutting his hair off for a children's cancer charity, which he donated.
  - Survivor: Island of the Idols: Jamal Shipman received $15,000, while Elaine Stott and Janet Carbin received $100,000 each.
  - Survivor 42: Drea Wheeler received $100,000.
  - Survivor 43: Jesse Lopez received $100,000, while Owen Knight and Ryan Medrano each received $50,000.
  - Survivor 44: Carolyn Wiger received $100,000, with Carson Garrett and Lauren Harpe each receiving $15,000.
- Survivor 50: In the Hands of the Fans reintroduced the viewer vote to award $100,000. This was sponsored by pop singer Sia, as a Celebrity Fan, introducing a twist to the show (as had occurred throughout the season). This award was won by Cirie Fields.

== Variations in the format ==
Aside from the American version, other franchises introduced variations and twists for the game. Most of these twists and variations are used in other franchises as well:

Expedition Robinson Sweden

- During the 1998 and 1999 seasons, during the pre-merge portion of the competition when a tribe lost an immunity challenge the opposing tribe would vote to eliminate one of their members.
- In the 1998 season a "Joker" joined the game midway through. Since then this twist has become very common among Survivor versions around the world, either as a twist or as a contingency plan.
- During the 1999 season the contestants were initially divided into four tribes. This twist would later be used in the American version of Survivor during Survivor: Exile Island and Survivor: Cook Islands.
- During the 1999 season the twist of "The Black Vote" was introduced. During the merge portion of the competition whenever someone was voted out before they left tribal council they would cast one more vote. This vote would then be carried over to the next tribal council and whoever received the vote, assuming they didn't have immunity, would have an extra vote against them.
- During the 2002 season when a contestant was voted out they were sent to a secret island where they would take part in a duel with another eliminated contestant. The contestant who lost said duel would be eliminated for good while the winner remained on the island. The person still inhabiting the island when there were only three contestants left in the game would re-enter the competition. This twist would later be used in several different versions of the show and has recently been used on Survivor: Redemption Island, Survivor: South Pacific and Survivor: Blood vs. Water.
- During the All-Stars version of Expedition Robinson the tribes were initially divided into two tribes, one composed of "Veterans" and the other of "Fans". This type of twist was also used in the American version of Survivor during Survivor: Micronesia and Survivor: Caramoan.
- During the 2004 season the twist known as "Team X" was introduced. Shortly after the competition began a new group of contestants entered the game and lived separately and secretly away from the other contestants until a certain point in the game. This twist has since also been used in Norway's 2009 season.
- During the 2004 and 2005 seasons a former contestant entered the game. This twist has since been used in many different Survivor versions around the world.
- During the 2005 season the tribes were initially divided up into a "Rich" tribe and a "Poor" tribe. This twist has since been used in the Danish, Norwegian, and American versions, most notably in Survivor: Fiji.

Expeditie Robinson Belgium/Netherlands

- During the 2005 season the tribes were initially divided up by age into "Old" and "Young", with the old contestants being forty and older and the young contestants being under the age of thirty. This twist was later used during Survivor: Nicaragua and Robinsonekspedisjonen 2009.
- During the pre-merge portion of the 2006 season two former contestants returned to the game to lead the tribes. As the leader, they were allowed to give individual immunity to any member of their tribe when they went to tribal council. Neither of these two contestants was eligible to win and both left shortly before the merge. A similar twist occurred in Survivor South Africa: Champions, except with sporting champions in the place of former contestants.
- When there were only three contestants left during the 2006 season all of the contestants that had lost on "Losers Island" voted to eliminate one of the finalists.
- The 2007 season began with one hundred contestants. Because many of these contestants weren't on the show for more than a couple of episodes many of their surnames are unknown.
- When it came time to reveal the winner of the 2008 season it was revealed that the jury vote was tied at 3–3. This led to seventy four former contestants voting for a winner.
- During the 2009 season the two tribes were initially composed of only women while a smaller tribe of men were hidden on a secluded beach. The men eventually entered the main competition in episode four. A similar twist was later used during Robinson 2011.
- The 2014 run saw the introduction of a 3-way tribe contest: Heaven, Earth and Hell. Hell being placed in the middle of the mangrove bush. During the first episodes, the losing tribe would vote off a member and relocate to Hell.
- The 2015 season started with an individual format. It started with 17 players, but the challenges had to be played in two even teams. So, before the first three challenges, one person was sent to a separate island and the rest of them created two teams. So the challenges were played with two teams of eight, seven and six. After that, only 11 players were left on the island. They had to make one group of seven and one group of four, which would join the three people sent to Tayak. From that point, it was Kamp Noord versus Kamp Zuid again.

Koh-Lanta (France)

- In every season of Koh-Lanta, just before the tribe merge, an ambassador is chosen in each tribe. Through season 8, they had the power to give one more vote to any contestant for the first Tribal Council of the merged tribe. In season 9 and later seasons (including the two All-Stars seasons), they were able to directly eliminate a contestant. However, if none of the ambassadors agrees to vote for/eliminate one contestant, they must draw one pearl from a bag. The one who gets the black pearl loses and either gets a vote or is directly eliminated depending on the season.
- During season 3 (Bocas del Toro), the oldest man and woman had the option to choose the composition of their respective tribes, as long as gender parity was respected.
- During season 4 (Panama), the two tribes were divided by gender. However, after 8 days, the tribes were mixed. A variation was used during season 10 (Vietnam), where the tribes were divided by gender except that one person per tribe was of the opposite gender.
- During season 5 (Pacific) and season 6 (Vanuatu), the tribes were divided by age: older or younger than 31 years old.
- During season 7 (Palawan) and season 8 (Caramoan), there was a challenge before the tribes' composition was decided: the best man and woman got the privilege to decide on the composition of their tribes, while the last man and woman were directly eliminated. The latter rule was also applied in season 9 (Palau) and in the first All-Stars season.
- During the second All-Stars season, seven previous contestants were part of one tribe, while the other tribe was composed of famous French sportsmen.
- In season 11 (Raja Ampat), two new rules were introduced: the hidden immunity idol, known from its appearance in the American version, and a new rule called the "vote noir" (black vote). After a contestant gets voted out at the Tribal Council, he or she can vote one more time against one of the remaining contestants of his or her tribe before quitting the game. This vote is counted at the tribe's next Tribal Council.
- The third All-Stars season featured sixteen former contestants who, despite their performances, hasn't previously become the Sole Survivor.
- In season 12 (Malaysia), four contestants out of the starting 20 won't initially be part of either of the two starting tribes. Instead, they will be on a version of "Exile Island", and will need to prove themselves in order to be integrated into one of the two tribes. Also, for the first time in the history of the program, two contestants will be eliminated at once in a single Tribal Council.
- Due to an accidental death during the first day of shooting season 13, those in charge of producing the show decided to cancel the 2013 season. Following a fierce discussion of these events in the media regarding the medical conditions, the show's doctor took his own life. However, this didn't stop the show entirely, coming back in 2014 with a fourth all-stars season.

Robinson Ekspeditionen Denmark

- Because it was originally thought that the fifth season of Robinson would be the last to air in Denmark, Robinson Ekspeditionen 2002 was the first ever "All-Stars" version of Survivor to be broadcast worldwide. Since then there have been several All-Stars versions including ones in America, Belgium/Netherlands, France, Israel, and Sweden.
- During the 2005 season the contestants were divided up into tribes based on where they were from within Denmark.
- During the 2006 season all of the contestants were well known Danish athletes.
- In keeping with the theme of the season, during the 2006 season all of the contestants were eliminated through duels rather than voting.
- During the 2007 season the tribes were composed of past contestants from Robinson Ekspeditionen and contestants of another show known as Paradise Hotel.
- During the 2008 season the tribes were composed of fans of Robinson Ekspeditionen and former contestants from Paradise Hotel.
- During the 2009 season the tribes were initially divided into "Smart" and "Dumb" based on the results of an IQ test the contestants took prior to the start of the competition.
- During the 2010 season the contestants took part in a challenge that would ultimately divide them into "Masters" and "Slaves" within their own tribes (one tribe was composed of male masters and female slaves while the other was composed of female masters and male slaves).

Robinsonid (Estonia), Robinsoni (Latvia), Robinzonai (Lithuania)

- Because a representative from each participating country was necessary for the finale, the last remaining member of each tribe was immune from all remaining eliminations.
- In all seasons of Baltic Robinson the jury would vote for who they didn't want to win as opposed to who they did. These votes would be added along with those given to the losers of the plank (in all seasons) and those of the public (in the first two seasons) or of the finalists (in season 3).

Survivor Israel

- Introduced the "Double-Power Challenge" in Survivor 10: The Caribbean. The double-power challenge is an individual challenge, which is played after the Immunity challenge. Every person going to Tribal Council had to compete, and the winner of the challenge won an additional power at Tribal Council.
- Introduced the "Veto Armlet" in Survivor 10: Pearl Islands. Aside from the Immunity Challenge, where the winner of the challenge wins the immunity, the Israeli version introduced the Armlet Veto, wherein the winner of the Veto Challenge gets the armlet. The Veto Armlet is used to prevent a castaway from voting in the tribal council. In the last tribal council the Veto Armlet is used to prevent a jury member from voting instead.

Robinsonekspedisjonen Norway

- In November 2011 it was announced that the 2012 season of Robinsonekspedisjonen will be known as "Robinson: Vinter" (Robinson: Winter) and it will be the first ever season of Robinson or Survivor to ever take place in a cold climate as it will be filmed in Norway.

Survivor Philippines

- Introduced the "Cursed and White Pearls", both roughly the size of a standard billiard ball. During the merge stage, the person voted out, before having his/her torch snuffed out, will receive either one or both of the Pearls and give each Pearl to one of the remaining castaways. The castaway who receives the Cursed Pearl gets one vote in the following Tribal Council. In case the Cursed Pearl is lost, the holder would then receive two votes. In-show, the Cursed Pearl is called the "Black Pearl" (though in the first season, its actual color is really silver). On the other hand, the White Pearl will have one vote subtracted from the count in the receiver's favor in the next Tribal Council, should at least one such vote comes up. This was introduced in the first season of Survivor Philippines.
- Introduced the "Blood Pearl" in Survivor Philippines: Palau. The Blood Pearl served the same purpose as the Cursed Pearl, only, the holder would receive two votes in the next Tribal Council. In case the Blood Pearl is lost, three votes would be counted against the holder.
- Introduced the Isla Purgatorio, which is called the Redemption Island in American version.
- Introduced the "doubles format" in Survivor Philippines: Celebrity Doubles Showdown, wherein castaways are grouped as couples with preexisting relationships. In this format, the couple is treated as one castaway, wherein both members get immunity after winning Immunity Challenges, both win the reward from the Reward Challenges, and both are voted out in the Tribal Council.
- Also in Survivor Philippines: Celebrity Doubles Showdown, the "Temptation Reward" was introduced. The winning tribe in a Reward Challenge would choose one or two of their own to be the only one(s) partaking in the Temptation Reward. After being shown the Temptation Reward, the chosen one(s) was/were then also presented with the consequence that comes upon accepting the Temptation Reward. Declining from the Temptation Reward is also an option if those chosen would deem accepting it be too harmful to their life in the game.

Twists of unknown origins

- During the year 2002 several different versions of Survivor used the twist of gender-based tribes as the main twist for their seasons. Due to the fact that at the time the Baltic, Belgian/Dutch, Danish, Norwegian, and Swedish seasons were all traveling together in order to conserve and pool their resources (a common practice for the franchise), there is no way to determine which production team came up with the idea of the twist (though it's unlikely to be the Baltic's or Norway's as neither edition has ever used this twist). The same twist was used a few months later in 2003 during Survivor: The Amazon and a couple years later in 2004 during Survivor: Vanuatu.

== International versions ==
The Survivor format has been adapted for numerous international versions of the show, some named after the original Expedition Robinson.

Legend:

Currently airing franchise
Franchise with an upcoming season
Franchise no longer aired
Status unknown

| Country/Region | Local title English title | Network(s) | Winners | Host(s) |
|---|---|---|---|---|
| Botswana, Ethiopia, Ghana, Kenya, Namibia, Nigeria, Zambia, Zimbabwe | Survivor Africa | M-Net | Season 1, 2006: Tsholofelo Gasenelwe | Anthony Oseyemi |
| Argentina | Expedición Robinson; Expedition Robinson | Canal 13 | Season 1, 2000: Sebastián Martino; Season 2, 2001: María Victoria Fernández | Julián Weich |
| Argentina | Survivor, Expedición Robinson; Survivor, Expedition Robinson | Telefe | Season 3, 2024: Eugenia Propedo; Season 4, 2026: Upcoming season | Marley |
| Australia | Australian Survivor | Nine Network | Season 1, 2002: Rob Dickson | Lincoln Howes |
| Australia | Australian Survivor | Network 10 | Season 3, 2016: Kristie Bennett; Season 4, 2017: Jericho Malabonga; Season 5, 2018: Shane Gould; Season 6, 2019: Pia Miranda; Season 7, 2020: David Genat; Season 8, 2021: Hayley Leake; Season 9, 2022: Mark Wales; Season 10, 2023: Liz Parnov; Season 11, 2024: Feras Basal; Season 12, 2025: Myles Kuah; Season 13, 2025: Parvati Shallow; Season 14, 2026: Caleb Beeby; Season 15, 2027: Upcoming season | Current; David Genat (14–); Former; Jonathan LaPaglia (3–13) |
| Australia | Australian Celebrity Survivor | Seven Network | Season 2, 2006: Guy Leech | Ian "Dicko" Dickson |
| Austria, Germany | Expedition Robinson | ORF; RTL 2 | Season 1, 2000: Melanie Lauer (Note: The German RTL2 created their own version of Survivor, Gestrandet – Zeig, was in dir steckt!, after airing a co-production of Austrian-German Survivor in season 1. Austria had not continued its own series nor co-produced an Austrian-German Survivor after season 1.) | Volker Piesczek |
| Azerbaijan | Ekstrim Azərbaycan; Extreme Azerbaijan | Space TV | Season 1, 2011: Kemal Cenk İçten | Emin Əhmədov |
| Balkans; Croatia; Serbia; Montenegro; Bosnia&Herz. | Survivor | RTL Televizija (Croatia); Prva Srpska Televizija (Serbia) | Season 1, 2012: Vlada Vuksanović (Note: Is a season co-produced by the Croatian and Serbian franchises. It was the second season of Survivor to air in Croatia and the fourth season to air in Serbia.) | Andrija Milošević; Marijana Batinić; Antonija Blaće; Milan Kalinić |
| Balkans; Croatia; Serbia; Montenegro; Bosnia&Herz. | Survivor | Nova BH (Bosnia and Herzegovina); Nova M (Montenegro); Nova S (Serbia); Nova TV (Croatia) | Season 2, 2022: Stefan Nevistić and Nevena Blanuša (Note: Is a season co-produced by the Croatian and Serbian franchises. It was the third season of Survivor to air in Croatia and the fifth season to air in Serbia.); Season 3, 2023: Nataša Kondić and Antonia Ivić; Season 4, 2024: Tijana Jeremić and Luka Rimac; Season 5, 2025: Uroš Čiča and Luciano Plazibat; Season 6, 2026: Marko Ristić & Roko Bačelić | Current; Ammar Mešić (6–); Vlado Boban (5–); Former; Bojan Perić (2–5); Mario Mlinarić (2–4); Danijela Buzurović (Note: Is host of the Tv show Survivor plus, which is aired on Nova S and Nova M) |
| Estonia, Latvia, Lithuania | Robinsonid / Robinsoni / Robinzonai; Robinson | TV3 Estonia; TV3 Latvia; TV3 Lithuania | Season 1, 2000: Zane Mukāne; Season 2, 2001: Māris Šveiduks; Season 3, 2002: Rimas Valeikis | Emil Rutiku; Mārtiņš Freimanis (Season 1); Pauls Timrots (Seasons 2–3); Vytautas Kernagis |
| Estonia, Latvia, Lithuania | Džunglistaar / Džungļu zvaigznes / Džiungles; Jungle Stars | TV3 Estonia; TV3 Latvia; TV3 Lithuania | Season 1, 2004: Dagmāra Legante | Tõnu Kark; Raimond Dombrovskis; Vytautas Kernagis |
| Belgium, Flanders | Expeditie Robinson; Expedition Robinson | VIER | Season 1, 2018: Robbe De Backer | Bartel Van Riet |
| Belgium, Netherlands | Expeditie Robinson; Expedition Robinson | VT4; NET 5 | Season 1, 2000: Karin Lindenhovius; Season 2, 2001: Richard Mackowiak; Season 3, 2002: Derek Blok; Season 4, 2003: Jutta Borms; Season 5, 2004: Frank de Meulder | Ernst-Paul Hasselbach (1–5); Désiré Naessens (1); Roos Van Acker (2–5) |
| Belgium, Netherlands | Expeditie Robinson; Expedition Robinson | Tien; 2BE; RTL 5 | Season 6, 2005: Marnix Allegaert; Season 7, 2006: Olga Urashova | Ernst-Paul Hasselbach (6–7); Lotte Verlackt (6–7); Evi Hanssen (7) |
| Belgium, Netherlands | Expeditie Robinson; Expedition Robinson | 2BE; RTL 5 | Season 8, 2007: Vinncent Arrendell; Season 9, 2008: Yin Oei Sian; Season 10, 2009: Marcel Vandezande; Season 11, 2010: Regina Romeijn; Season 12, 2011: Tanja Dexters; Season 13, 2012: Fatima Moreira de Melo | Ernst-Paul Hasselbach (8–9); Evi Hanssen (8–13); Eddy Zoëy (10–12); Dennis Weening (13) |
| Belgium, Netherlands | Expeditie Robinson; Expedition Robinson | VIER; Videoland | Season 21, 2020: Thomas Roobrouck | Bartel Van Riet; Geraldine Kemper |
| Belgium, Netherlands | Expeditie Robinson; Expedition Robinson | VTM; RTL 4 | Season 28, 2026: Current season | Camille Vanuxem; Edson da Graça; Nicolette Kluijver |
| Belgium, Netherlands | Expeditie Robinson: Strijd der Titanen; Expedition Robinson: Battle of the Titans | Tien; 2BE | Season 1, 2006: Ryan van Esch | Ernst-Paul Hasselbach; Lotte Verlackt |
| Brazil | No Limite; On the Edge | TV Globo | Season 1, 2000: Elaine de Melo; Season 2, 2001: Léo Rassi; Season 3, 2001: Rodrigo Trigueiro; Season 4, 2009: Luciana de Araújo; Season 5, 2021: Paula Amorim; Season 6, 2022: Charles Gama; Season 7, 2023: Dedé Macedo | Zeca Camargo (1–4); André Marques (5); Fernando Fernandes (6–7) |
| Bulgaria | Сървайвър БГ; Survivor BG | bTV | Season 1, 2006: Neli Ivanova; Season 2, 2007: Georgi Kostadinov; Season 3, 2008: Nikolay Martinov; Season 4, 2009: Georgi Kehaiov; Season 5, 2014: Vanja Džaferović; Season 6, 2022: Zoran Petrovski; Season 7, 2023: Blagoy Georgiev | Kamen Vodenicharov (1); Vladimir Karamazov (2–3; 4 [from day 21]–6); Evtim Miloshev (4 [to day 20]); Vanja Džaferović (7) |
| Canada (Quebec) | Survivor Québec | Noovo | Season 1, 2023: Nicolas Brunette; Season 2, 2024: Ghyslain Octeau-Piché; Season 3, 2025: Geneviève La Haye; Season 4, 2026: Kathrine Huet; Season 5, 2027: Upcoming season | Patrice Bélanger |
| China | 走入香格里拉; Into the Shangri-La | CCTV | Season 1, 2001: Members of Sun Village | Unknown |
| Chile | Expedición Robinson: La Isla VIP; Expedition Robinson: The VIP Island | Canal 13 | Season 1, 2006: Marcela Roberts | Sergio Lagos; Karla Constant |
| Colombia | Expedición Robinson; Expedition Robinson | Caracol TV | Season 1, 2001: Rolando Patarroyo; Season 2, 2002: Cristóbal Echevarría | Margarita Francisco |
| Colombia | La Isla de Los Famos.o.s. (1–4); The Island of the Famous; Survivor: La Isla de Los Famosos (5) | RCN TV | Season 1, 2004: María Cecilia Sánchez; Season 2, 2005: Leonel Álvarez; Season 3, 2006: Lucas Jaramillo; Season 4, 2007: José Javier Ramírez; Season 5, 2023: Juan del Mar | Guillermo Prieto (1–4); Katerine Porto (1); Tatán Mejía (5) |
| Croatia | Survivor: Odisejev Otok; Survivor: Odyssey Island | HRT 2 | Season 1, 2005: Vazmenko Pervan | Kristijan Potočki |
| Czech Republic | Trosečník | Prima televize | Season 1, 2006: Ingrid Golasová | Marek Vašut |
| Czech Republic | Robinsonův ostrov Robinson Island | TV Nova | Season 1, 2017: Marek Orlík; Season 2, 2018: Martin Složil | Ondřej Novotný |
| Czechia; Slovakia | Survivor Česko & Slovensko | Current; TV Nova (1-); Voyo SK (2-); Former; Markíza (1) | Season 1, 2022: Vladimír Čapek; Season 2, 2023: Tomáš Weimann; Season 3, 2024: Martin "Mikýř" Mikyska; Season 4, 2025: Pavel Tóth; Season 5, 2026: Otakar Šenkýř; Season 6, 2027: Upcoming season | Current; Ondřej Novotný(1-); Former; Martin Šmahel (1) |
| Denmark | Robinson Ekspeditionen; Robinson Expedition | TV3 | Season 1, 1998: Regina Pedersen; Season 2, 1999: Dan Marstrand; Season 3, 2000: Sonny Rønne Pedersen; Season 4, 2001: Malene Hasselblad; Season 5, 2002: Henrik Ørum; Season 6, 2003: Frank Quistgard; Season 7, 2004: Mette Frandsen; Season 8, 2005: Mogens Brandstrup; Season 9, 2006: Diego Tur; Season 10, 2007: Rikke Gøransson; Season 11, 2008: Daniela Hansen; Season 12, 2009: Villy Eenberg; Season 13, 2010: Søren Engelbret; Season 14, 2011: Hugo Kleister; Season 15, 2013: Jeppe Bruun Hansen; Season 16, 2014: Stina Herbenö; Season 17, 2015: Kenneth Mikkelsen; Season 18, 2016: Henrik Oltmann Andersen; Season 19, 2017: Marlene Berardino; Season 20, 2018: Jamil Faizi; Season 21, 2019: Nis Andreas Prio Sørensen; Season 22, 2021: Katrine Ørskov Hedeman; Season 23, 2022: Mikkel Bertelsen; Season 24, 2023: Majbritt Fejfer Olsen; Season 25, 2024: Nicolaj Schrøder; Season 26, 2025: Anton Basbas Pedersen; Season 27, 2026: Current season | Current; Jakob Kjeldbjerg (7–present); Former; Thomas Mygind (1–6) |
| Ecuador | Expedición Robinson; Expedition Robinson | Teleamazonas | Season 1, 2003: Tito Grefa | Marisa Sánchez |
| Finland | Suomen Robinson; Finnish Robinson | Nelonen | Season 1, 2004: Marjaana Valkeinen; Season 2, 2005: Mira Jantunen | Jarmo Mäkinen (1); Arttu Harkki (2) |
| Finland | Selviytyjät Suomi; Survivors Finland | MTV3 | Season 1, 2013: Jarkko Kortesoja | Heikki Paasonen |
| Finland | Selviytyjät Suomi; Survivors Finland | Nelonen | Season 2, 2018: Sampo Kaulanen; Season 3, 2019: Miska Haakana; Season 4, 2019: Kai Fagerlund; Season 5, 2021: Kristian Heiskari; Season 6, 2021: Shirly Karvinen; Season 7, 2022: Sami Helenius; Season 8, 2023: Teemu Roivainen; Season 9, 2024: Mia "Millu" Haataja; Season 10, 2025: Saana Akiola; Season 11, 2026: Current season | Current; Riku Rantala (8–present); Former; Juuso Mäkilähde (2–7) |
| France (Belgium) (Note: Starting from the 11th season, Belgians were eligible to apply for the French series.) (Switzerland) (Note: Starting from the 10th season, the Swiss were eligible to apply for the French series.) | Koh-Lanta | TF1 | Season 1, 2001: Gilles Nicolet; Season 2, 2002: Amel Fatnassi; Season 3, 2003: Isabelle Seguin and Delphine Bano; Season 4, 2004: Philippe Bordier; Season 5, 2005: Clémence Castel; Season 6, 2006: François-David Cardonnel; Season 7, 2007: Jade Handi and Kevin Cuoco; Season 8, 2008: Christelle Gauzet; Season 9, 2009: Christina Chevry; Season 10, 2010: Philippe Duron; Season 11, 2011: Gérard Urdampilleta; Season 12, 2012–13: Ugo Lartiche; Season 13, 2013: Cancelled; Season 14, 2015: Marc Rambaud; Season 15, 2016: Wendy Gervois; Season 16, 2016: Benoît Assadi; Season 17, 2017: Frédéric Blancher; Season 18, 2017: André Deleplace; Season 19, 2018: Cancelled; Season 20, 2019: Maud Bamps; Season 21, 2020: Alexandra Pornet; Season 22, 2021: Maxine Eouzan; Season 23, 2022: Bastien San Pedro and François Descamp; Season 24, 2023: Frédéric Khouvilay; Season 25, 2024: Léa Sahin; Season 26, 2024: Thibault Bélanger; Season 27, 2025: Gaëlle Fleury; Season 28, 2026: Cynthia Combes; Season 29, 2027: Upcoming season | Current; Denis Brogniart (2–present); Former; Hubert Auriol (1) |
| France (Belgium) (Switzerland) | Koh-Lanta: All-Stars | TF1 | Season 1, 2009: Romuald Lafite; Season 2, 2010: Grégoire Delachaux; Season 3, 2012: Bertrand Bolle; Season 4, 2014: Laurent Maistret; Season 5, 2018: Clémence Castel; Season 6, 2020: Naoil Tita; Season 7, 2021: No Winner; Season 8, 2026: Lola Labesse | Denis Brogniart |
| Georgia | უკანასკნელი გმირი The Last Hero | Rustavi 2 | Season 1, 2007–08: Tamar Chanturashvili | Giorgi Korkia |
| Germany | Das Inselduell | Sat.1 | Unofficial adaption, 2000: Michael | Holger Speckhahn |
| Germany | Expedition Robinson | ORF; RTL 2 | Season 1, 2000: Melanie Lauer | Volker Piesczek |
| Germany | Gestrandet – Zeig, was in dir steckt!^{1} | RTL 2 | Season 1, 2001: Alexander Kolo | Pierre Geisensetter |
| Germany | Outback | RTL | Unofficial adaption of Survivor: The Australian Outback, 2002: Sergej Schmidt | Markus Lanz |
| Germany | Survivor | ProSieben | Season 1, 2007: Volker Kreuzner | Sascha Kalupke |
| Germany | Survivor | VOX | Season 2, 2019: Lara Grünfeld | Florian Weber |
| Germany | Survivor | Sport1 | Season 3, 2026: Larissa Elena Renz | Detlef Soost |
| Greece; Cyprus | Survivor | Mega TV | Season 1, 2003: Evaggelia Dermetzoglou; Season 2, 2004: Konstantinos Christodoulopoulos | Grigoris Arnaoutoglou |
| Greece; Cyprus | Survivor | Skai TV; Sigma TV | Season 5, 2017: Giorgos Angelopoulos; Season 6, 2018: Ilias Gotsis; Season 8, 2020–21: Sakis Katsoulis; Season 9, 2021–22: Stathis Schizas; Season 11, 2024: Daniel Nurka; Season 12, 2024: Ninos Nikolaidis; Season 13, 2026: Stavros Floros (Note: Following a boating incident, production was suspended. The prize money and title of "Sole Survivor" was award to Stavros Floros) | Current; Giorgos Lianos (6–present); Former; Sakis Tanimanidis (5–7) |
| Greece; Cyprus | Survivor Patagonia; The Edge of the World | Mega TV | Season 4, 2010: Vaggelis Gerasimou | Giannis Aivazis |
| Greece; Cyprus | Survivor: Greece vs. Turkey (Note: Survivor: Greece vs. Turkey is a co-production between the Greek and Turkish Survivor franchises.) | Mega TV | Season 3, 2006: Derya Durmuşlar | Konstantinos Markoulakis |
| Greece; Cyprus | Survivor: Greece vs. Turkey | Skai TV; Sigma TV | Season 7, 2019: Katerina Dalaka & Yusuf Karakaya | Sakis Tanimanidis; Giorgos Lianos |
| Greece; Cyprus | Survivor All Star | Skai TV; Sigma TV | Season 10, 2023: Sakis Katsoulis | Giorgos Lianos |
| Hungary | Survivor – A sziget Survivor – The Island | RTL (Note: Channel name was RTL Klub for seasons 1–5 before the station's name change to RTL starting with season 6.) | Season 1, 2003: Tünde Molnár; Season 2, 2004: Dávid Hankó; Season 3, 2017: Iliász Shweirif; Season 4, 2018: Dávid Tömböly; Season 5, 2021: Dániel Pintér; Season 6, 2023: Viktória Kiss | Current; Miklós Varga (5–present); Former; András Stohl (1–2); Istenes Bence (3–4) |
| India (Hindi) | Survivor India – The Ultimate Battle | Star Plus | Season 1, 2012: Raj Rani | Sameer Kochhar |
| India (Tamil) | Survivor Tamil | Zee Tamil | Season 1, 2021: Vijayalakshmi Feroz | Arjun Sarja |
| Israel | הישרדות; Survival | Channel 10 | Season 1, 2007–08: Na'ama Kaesari; Season 2, 2008–09: Erik Alper; Season 3, 2009: Shay Arel; Season 4, 2010: Natan Bashevkin; Season 5, 2011: Irit Rahamim Basis | Guy Zu-Aretz |
| Israel | הישרדות; Survival | Channel 2 | Season 7, 2015–16: Liron "Tiltil" Orfali; Season 8, 2017: Inbar Pinievsky Basson | Guy Zu-Aretz |
| Israel | הישרדות; Survival | Reshet 13 | Season 12, 2022–23: Elit Musayof; Season 13, 2024–25: Nitzan Yerushalmy; Season 14, 2026: Current season | Guy Zu-Aretz |
| Israel | הישרדות VIP; Survival VIP | Channel 10 | Season 6, 2012: Itay Segev | Guy Zu-Aretz |
| Israel | הישרדות VIP; Survival VIP | Reshet 13 | Season 9, 2019: Đovani Roso; Season 10, 2020: Asi Buzaglo; Season 11, 2021–22: Alla Eibinder | Guy Zu-Aretz |
| Italy | Survivor Italia | Italia 1 | Season 1, 2001: Milica Miletic | Pietro Suber; Benedetta Corbi (Studio) |
| Italy | L'Isola dei Famosi; The Island of the Famous | Rai 2 | Season 1, 2003: Walter Nudo; Season 2, 2004: Sergio Múñiz; Season 3, 2005: Lory Del Santo; Season 4, 2006: Luca Calvani; Season 5, 2007: Manuela Villa; Season 6, 2008: Vladimir Luxuria; Season 7, 2010: Daniele Battaglia; Season 8, 2011: Giorgia Palmas; Season 9, 2012: Antonella Elia | Simona Ventura (Studio, 1–8); Marco Mazzocchi (1); Massimo Caputi (2–3); Paolo Brosio (4); Francesco Facchinetti (5); Filippo Magnini (6); Rossano Rubicondi (7); Daniele Battaglia (8); Nicola Savino (Studio, 9); Vladimir Luxuria (9) |
| Italy | L'Isola dei Famosi; The Island of the Famous | Canale 5 | Season 10, 2015: Donatella; Season 11, 2016: Giacobbe Fragomeni; Season 12, 2017: Raz Degan; Season 13, 2018: Nino "Gaspare" Formicola; Season 14, 2019: Marco Maddaloni; Season 15, 2021: Simone Paciello; Season 16, 2022: Nicolas Vaporidis; Season 17, 2023: Marco Mazzoli; Season 18, 2024: Aras Şenol; Season 19, 2025: Cristina Plevani; Season 20, 2026: Upcoming season | Current; Veronica Gentili (Studio, 19–present); Pierpaolo Pretelli (19–present); Former; Alessia Marcuzzi (Studio, 10–14); Alberto 'Alvin' Bonato (10–11, 14,16–17); Stefano Bettarini (12); Stefano De Martino (13); Ilary Blasi (Studio, 15–17); Massimiliano Rosolino (15); Vladimir Luxuria (Studio, 18); Elenoire Casalegno (18) |
| Japan | サバイバー; Survivor | TBS | Season 1, Spring 2002: Eri Minoshima; Season 2, Summer 2002: Asami Kawamura; Season 3, Fall 2002: Yasuhito Ebisawa; Season 4, Winter 2003: Kōshin Gunji | Neptune; Munehiro Tokita |
| Lebanon | سرفايفر; Survivor | LBC | Season 1, 2004: Hussein El-Abass | Tareq Mounir |
| Mexico | Survivor México | Azteca Uno | Season 1, 2020: Eduardo Urbina; Season 2, 2021: Pablo Martí; Season 3, 2022: Julian Huergo; Season 4, 2023: Pablo Martí; Season 5, 2024: Esmeralda Zamora; Season 6, 2025: Sergio Torres; Season 7, 2026: Avril Andrade | Current; Carlos Guerrero (2–present); Former; Arturo Islas Allende (1) |
| Netherlands | Expeditie Robinson; Expedition Robinson | RTL 5 | Season 14, 2013: Edith Bosch; Season 15, 2014: Kay Nambiar; Season 16, 2015: Amara Onwuka; Season 17, 2016: Bertie Steur; Season 18, 2017: Carlos Platier Luna; Season 19, 2018: Jan Bronninkreef | Current; Nicolette Kluijver (15–present); Edson da Graça (27-present); Former; Evi Hanssen (14); Dennis Weening (14–19); Kaj Gorgels (20–22); Rick Brandsteder (24); Art Rooijakkers (25–26) |
| Netherlands | Expeditie Robinson; Expedition Robinson | RTL 4 | Season 20, 2019: Hugo Kennis; Season 22, 2021: Robbert Rodenburg; Season 24, 2022: Dennis Wilt; Season 25, 2023: Willem Voogd; Season 26, 2024: Kiran Badloe; Season 27, 2025: Camiel Kesbeke | Current; Nicolette Kluijver (15–present); Edson da Graça (27-present); Former; Evi Hanssen (14); Dennis Weening (14–19); Kaj Gorgels (20–22); Rick Brandsteder (24); Art Rooijakkers (25–26) |
| Netherlands | Expeditie Robinson: All Stars; Expedition Robinson: All Stars | RTL 4 | Season 23, 2022: Niels Gomperts | Art Rooijakkers; Geraldine Kemper |
| New Zealand | Survivor NZ | TVNZ 2 | Season 1, 2017: Avi Duckor-Jones; Season 2, 2018: Lisa Stanger | Matt Chisholm |
| Norway | Robinsonekspedisjonen; Expedition Robinson | TV3 | Season 1, 1999: Christer Falck; Season 2, 2000: Therese Andersen; Season 3, 2001: Mia Martinsen; Season 4, 2002: Ann Karene Molvig; Season 5, 2003: Emil Orderud; Season 6, 2004: Jan Stian Gundersen; Season 7, 2007: Ann-Kristin Otnes; Season 8, 2008: Tom Andre Tveitan; Season 9, 2009: Lina Iversen; Season 10, 2010: Alita Dagmar Kristensen; Season 11, 2011: Lillan Ramøy; Season 12, 2012: Elisabeth Nielsen; Season 13, 2013: Bjørn Tore Bekkeli; Season 16, 2021: Maiken Charlotte Hetle; Season 17, 2022: Are Lundby Kvaal | Nils Ole Oftebro (1); Christer Falck (2–15); Silje Torp (16–17) |
| Norway | Robinsonekspedisjonen; Expedition Robinson | TV2 | Season 14, 2015: Maiken Sæther Olsen; Season 15, 2016: Thomas Larsen | Nils Ole Oftebro (1); Christer Falck (2–15); Silje Torp (16–17) |
| Pakistan | Survivor Pakistan | PTV; ARY; TVOne | Season 1, 2006: Muhammad Ziad | Unknown |
| Philippines | Survivor Philippines | GMA Network | Season 1, 2008: John Carlo "JC" Tiuseco; Season 2, 2009: Amanda Coolley Van Cooll | Paolo Bediones |
| Philippines | Survivor Philippines: Celebrity Showdown | GMA Network | Season 3, 2010: Akihiro Sato; Season 4, 2011–12: Albert "Betong" Sumaya Jr. | Richard Gutierrez |
| Poland | Wyprawa Robinson; Expedition Robinson | TVN | Season 1, 2004: Katarzyna Drzyżdżyk | Hubert Urbański |
| Poland | Wyspa przetrwania Island of Survival | Polsat | Season 2, 2017: Katarzyna Cebula | Damian Michałowski |
| Portugal | Survivor | TVI | Season 1, 2001: Pedro Besugo | Paulo Salvador; Teresa Guilherme |
| Romania | Supraviețuitorul; The Survivor | Pro TV | Season 1, 2016: Lucian "Zapp" Lupu | Dragoș Bucurenci (1) |
| Romania | Survivor România; Survivor Romania | Kanal D | Season 1, 2020: Elena Ionescu; Season 2, 2021: Edmond Zannidache | Dan Cruceru (1); Daniel Pavel (2–6) |
| Romania | Survivor România; Survivor Romania | Pro TV, Voyo | Season 3, 2022: Alex Delea; Season 4, 2023: Dan Ursa; Season 6, 2025: Ovidiu "Uwe Dai" Măcinic | Dan Cruceru (1); Daniel Pavel (2–6) |
| Romania | Survivor România; Survivor Romania | Antena 1 | Season 7, 2026: Gabriel Tamaș; Season 8, 2027: Upcoming season | Adi Vasile (7–) |
| Romania | Survivor România All Stars; Survivor Romania All Stars | Pro TV, Voyo | Season 5, 2024: Edmond Zannidache | Daniel Pavel |
| Russia | Последний герой The Last Hero | C1R | Season 1, 2001: Sergey Odintsov; Season 2, 2002–03: Veronika Norkina; Season 3, 2003: Vladimir Presnyakov Jr. Season 4, 2003–04: Yana Volkova; Season 5, 2004: Aleksandr Matveev; Season 6, 2008–09: Vladimir Lysenko | Sergei Bodrov Jr. (1); Dmitry Pevtsov (2); Nikolai Fomenko (3); Aleksandr Domogarov (4); Vladimir Menshov (5); Ksenia Sobchak (6) |
| Russia | Последний герой The Last Hero | TV-3 | Season 7, 2019: Anfisa Chernykh; Season 8, 2020: Nadezhda Angarskaya; Season 9, 2021: Roman Nikkel; Season 10, 2023: Alexey Lukin; Season 11, 2024: Dmitriy Konyshev | Current; Kseniya Borodina (10–11); Former; Yana Troyanova (7–9) |
| Denmark, Norway, Sweden | Expedition Robinson: VIP (Note: Expedition Robinson 2005 (VIP) was a pan-regional version of Denmark, Norway, and Sweden.) | TV3 Denmark; TV3 Norway; TV3 Sweden | Season 1, 2005: Tilde Fröling | Mikkel Beha Erichsen (Denmark); Christer Falck (Norway); Robert Aschberg (Sweden) |
| Serbia | Survivor Srbija; Survivor Serbia | Prva TV | Season 1, 2008–09: Nemanja Pavlov; Season 2, 2009–10: Aleksandar Krajišnik; Season 3, 2010–11: Andrej Maričić | Andrija Milošević |
| Slovakia | Celebrity Camp | TV JOJ | Season 1, 2007: Aneta Parišková | Janko Kroner; Petra Polnišová |
| Slovakia | Ostrov; Island | Markíza | Season 1, 2016: Filip Ferianec | Marián Mitaš |
| Slovenia | Survivor Srbija; Survivor Serbia | TV 3 | Season 1, 2009–10: See Survivor Srbija 2 | Ula Furlan |
| Slovenia | Survivor Slovenija; Survivor Slovenia | POP TV | Season 2, 2016: Alen Perklič | Miran Stanovnik |
| South Africa | Survivor South Africa | M-Net | Season 1, 2006: Vanessa Marawa; Season 2, 2007: Lorette Mostert; Season 3, 2010: Perle "GiGi" van Schalkwyk; Season 4, 2011: Hykie Berg; Season 5, 2014: Graham Jenneker; Season 6, 2018: Tom Swartz; Season 7, 2019: Robert "Rob" Bentele; Season 8, 2021: Nicole Wilmans; Season 9, 2022: Dino Paulo | Current; Nico Panagio (3–9); Former; Mark Bayly (1–2) |
| Spain | Supervivientes: Expedición Robinson; Survivors: Expedition Robinson | Telecinco | Season 1, 2000: Xavier Monjonell; Season 2, 2001: Alfredo "Freddy" Cortina | Juan Manuel López Iturriaga (1–2); Paco Lobatón (2) |
| Spain | La Isla de los FamoS.O.S. The Island of the Famou-S.O.S. | Antena 3 | Season 3, 2003: Daniela Cardone; Season 4, 2003: Felipe López | Paula Vázquez; Alonso Caparrós (3); Nuria Roca (4) |
| Spain | La Selva de los FamoS.O.S. The Jungle of the Famou-S.O.S. | Antena 3 | Season 5, 2004: Jose Antonio Canales Rivera | Paula Vázquez; Nuria Roca |
| Spain | Aventura en África; Adventure in Africa | Antena 3 | Season 6, 2005: Víctor Janeiro | Paula Vázquez; Nuria Roca |
| Spain | Supervivientes; Survivors | Telecinco | Season 7, 2006: Carmen Russo; Season 8, 2007: Nilo Manrique; Season 9, 2008: Miriam Sánchez; Season 10, 2009: Maite Zúñiga; Season 11, 2010: María José Fernández; Season 12, 2011: Rosa Benito; Season 13, 2014: Abraham García; Season 14, 2015: Christopher Mateo; Season 15, 2016: Jorge Díaz; Season 16, 2017: José Luis Losa; Season 17, 2018: Sofía Suescun; Season 18, 2019: Omar Montes; Season 19, 2020: Jorge Pérez; Season 20, 2021: Olga Moreno; Season 21, 2022: Alejandro Nieto; Season 22, 2023: Bosco Blach Martínez-Bordiú; Season 23, 2024: Pedro García Aguado; Season 24, 2024: Marta Peñate; Season 25, 2025: Borja González; Season 26, 2025: Rubén Torres; Season 27, 2026: Maica Benedicto; Season 28, 2026: Current season | Main host: Jesús Vázquez (7–11); Christian Gálvez (10); Jorge Javier Vázquez (12–); Carlos Sobera (22); Island host: José María Íñigo (7); Mario Picazo (8–10); Eva González (11); Raquel Sánchez Silva (12–13); Lara Álvarez (14–21); Laura Madrueño (22–); Tuesday gala: Jorge Javier Vázquez (16–17); Carlos Sobera (18–); Debate: Lucía Riaño (8); Emma García (9; 11); Daniel Domenjó (10); Christian Gálvez (12); Álvaro de la Lama (13); Raquel Sánchez Silva (14); Sandra Barneda (15–17; 23-); Jordi González (18–20); Ion Aramendi (21–22) |
| Sweden | Expedition Robinson | SVT | Season 1, 1997: Martin Melin; Season 2, 1998: Alexandra Zazzi; Season 3, 1999: Jerker Dalman; Season 4, 2000: Mattias Dalerstedt; Season 5, 2001–02: Jan Emanuel Johansson; Season 6, 2002: Antoni Matacz; Season 7, 2003–04: Emma Andersson | Harald Treutiger (1–2); Anders Lundin (3–7) |
| Sweden | Expedition Robinson | TV3 | Season 8, 2004: Jerry Forsberg; Season 9, 2005: Karolina Conrad | Robert Aschberg |
| Sweden | Expedition Robinson | TV4 | Season 10, 2009: Ellenor Pierre; Season 11, 2009–10: Hans Brettschneider; Season 12, 2010: Erik Svedberg; Season 13, 2011: Mats Kemi; Season 14, 2012: Mariana "Mirre" Hammarling; Season 16, 2018: Daniel "DK" Westlund; Season 17, 2019: Klas Beyer; Season 18, 2020: Michael "Micke" Björklund; Season 19, 2021: Dennis Johansson; Season 20, Spring 2022: Filip Johansson; Season 21, Fall 2022: Lars-Olov Johansson; Season 22, 2023: Oskar Hammarstedt; Season 23, 2023: Pelle Lilja; Season 24, 2024: Olivia Lindegren; Season 25, 2024: Ida Jensen Krogstad; Season 26, 2025: Aron Sjölund; Season 27, 2025: Johan Ekström; Season 28, 2026: Sonja Fredriksdotter Rudqvist; Season 29, 2026: Current season Season 30, 2027: Upcoming season | Current; Anders Lundin (3–7, 22–present); Martin Järborg (27–present); Harald Treutiger (30-present); Former; Linda Isacsson (10); Paolo Roberto (11–14); Anders Öfvergård (16–20); Petra Malm (21, 23, 25); Anna Brolin (26) |
| Sweden | Expedition Robinson | Sjuan | Season 15, 2015: Dan Spinelli Scala & Jennifer Egelryd | Linda Lindorff |
| Switzerland | Expedition Robinson | TV3 | Season 1, 1999: Andreas Widmer; Season 2, 2000: Stefanie Ledermann; Season 3, 2002: Carole Haari (Note: The season never aired due to the television network being shut down. The winner was only revealed later in a news article.) | Silvan Grütter |
| Turkey | Survivor: Büyük Macera; Survivor: Great Adventure | Kanal D | Season 1, 2005: Uğur Pektaş | Ahmet Utlu |
| Turkey | Survivor: Greece vs. Turkey | Show TV | Season 2, 2006: Derya Durmuşlar | Acun Ilıcalı (2) |
| Turkey | Survivor: Greece vs. Turkey | TV8 | Season 13, 2019: Yusuf Karakaya & Katerina Dalaka | Acun Ilıcalı; Murat Ceylan |
| Turkey | Survivor | Show TV | Season 3, 2007: Taner Özdeş; Season 4, 2010: Merve Oflaz | Acun Ilıcalı (3–4); Hanzade Ofluoğlu (4) |
| Turkey | Survivor: Ünlüler vs. Gönüllüler; Survivor: Celebrities vs. Volunteers | Show TV | Season 5, 2011: Derya Büyükuncu; Season 6, 2012: Nihat Altınkaya | Acun Ilıcalı; Burcu Esmersoy (6) |
| Turkey | Survivor: Ünlüler vs. Gönüllüler; Survivor: Celebrities vs. Volunteers | Star TV | Season 7, 2013: Hilmi Cem İntepe; Season 8, 2014: Turabi Çamkıran | Acun Ilıcalı; Alp Kırşan |
| Turkey | Survivor: Ünlüler vs. Gönüllüler; Survivor: Celebrities vs. Volunteers | TV8 | Season 10, 2016: Çağan Atakan Arslan; Season 11, 2017: Ogeday Girişken; Season 12, 2018: Adem Kılıçcı | Acun Ilıcalı; Alp Kırşan |
| Turkey | Survivor: Ünlüler vs. Gönüllüler; Survivor: Celebrities vs. Volunteers | TV8 | Season 14, 2020: Cemal Can Canseven; Season 15, 2021: İsmail Balaban; Season 17, 2023: Nefise Karatay; Season 19, 2025: Adem Kılıçcı; Season 20, 2026: Mert Nobre; Season 21, 2027: Upcoming season | Acun Ilıcalı; Murat Ceylan |
| Turkey | Survivor All Star | TV8 | Season 9, 2015: Turabi Çamkıran; Season 16, 2022: Nisa Bölükbaşı; Season 18, 2024: Ogeday Girişken | Acun Ilıcalı; Alp Kırşan; Murat Ceylan |
| Ukraine | Oстанній герой The Last Hero | ICTV | Season 1, 2011: Andrey Kovalski; Season 2, 2012: Alexei Diveyeff-Tserkovny | Ostap Stupka |
| United Kingdom | Survivor | ITV | Series 1, 2001: Charlotte Hobrough; Series 2, 2002: Jonny Gibb | Mark Austin (1); John Leslie (1); Mark Nicholas (2) |
| United Kingdom | Survivor | BBC One | Series 3, 2023: Matthew Haywood | Joel Dommett |
| United States (Canada) (Note: Starting from the 39th season, Canadians were eligible to apply for the American series.) | Survivor | CBS | Season 1, 2000: Richard Hatch; Season 2, 2001: Tina Wesson; Season 3, 2001–02: Ethan Zohn; Season 4, Spring 2002: Vecepia Towery; Season 5, Fall 2002: Brian Heidik; Season 6, Spring 2003: Jenna Morasca; Season 7, Fall 2003: Sandra Diaz-Twine; Season 8, Spring 2004: Amber Brkich; Season 9, Fall 2004: Chris Daugherty; Season 10, Spring 2005: Tom Westman; Season 11, Fall 2005: Danni Boatwright; Season 12, Spring 2006: Aras Baskauskas; Season 13, Fall 2006: Yul Kwon; Season 14, Spring 2007: Earl Cole; Season 15, Fall 2007: Todd Herzog; Season 16, Spring 2008: Parvati Shallow; Season 17, Fall 2008: Robert "Bob" Crowley; Season 18, Spring 2009: James "J.T." Thomas Jr.; Season 19, Fall 2009: Natalie White; Season 20, Spring 2010: Sandra Diaz-Twine; Season 21, Fall 2010: Jud "Fabio" Birza; Season 22, Spring 2011: Rob Mariano; Season 23, Fall 2011: Sophie Clarke; Season 24, Spring 2012: Kim Spradlin; Season 25, Fall 2012: Denise Stapley; Season 26, Spring 2013: John Cochran; Season 27, Fall 2013: Tyson Apostol; Season 28, Spring 2014: Tony Vlachos; Season 29, Fall 2014: Natalie Anderson; Season 30, Spring 2015: Mike Holloway; Season 31, Fall 2015: Jeremy Collins; Season 32, Spring 2016: Michele Fitzgerald; Season 33, Fall 2016: Adam Klein; Season 34, Spring 2017: Sarah Lacina; Season 35, Fall 2017: Ben Driebergen; Season 36, Spring 2018: Wendell Holland; Season 37, Fall 2018: Nick Wilson; Season 38, Spring 2019: Chris Underwood; Season 39, Fall 2019: Tommy Sheehan; Season 40, 2020: Tony Vlachos; Season 41, 2021: Erika Casupanan; Season 42, Spring 2022: Maryanne Oketch; Season 43, Fall 2022: Mike Gabler; Season 44, Spring 2023: Yamil "Yam Yam" Arocho; Season 45, Fall 2023: Dee Valladares; Season 46, Spring 2024: Kenzie Petty; Season 47, Fall 2024: Rachel LaMont; Season 48, Spring 2025: Kyle Fraser; Season 49, Fall 2025: Savannah Louie; Season 50, Spring 2026: Aubry Bracco; Season 51, Fall 2026: Current season | Jeff Probst |
| Venezuela | Robinson: La Gran Aventura; Robinson: The Great Adventure | Venevisión | Season 1, 2001: Gabriel Pérez; Season 2, 2002: Graciela Boza | Roberto Messuti |
| Vietnam | Tôi là người dẫn đầu I am the Leader | HTV7 | Season 1, 2012: Quách Văn Đen | Phan Anh |

=== Current series ===
Season currently being aired.

| Country | Latest Series | Launch date | Finale date | Network | Days | Survivors | Host | Winner | Grand prize |
|---|---|---|---|---|---|---|---|---|---|
| Argentina | Survivor, Expedición Robinson 2024 | 15 July 2024 | 11 October 2024 | Telefe | 60 | 25 | Alejandro Wiebe | Eugenia Propedo | $1,000,000 |
| Australia | Australian Survivor: Redemption | 23 February 2026 | 14 April 2026 | 10 | 45 | 24 | David Genat | Caleb Beeby | A$500,000 |
| Balkans (Croatia and Serbia) | Survivor Hrvatska & Srbija 2026 | 2 March 2026 | TBA | Nova BH; Nova TV; Nova M Nova S | TBA | TBA | Vlado Boban; Bojan Perić | TBA | €100.000 |
| Canada (Quebec) | Survivor Québec 2026 | 5 April 2026 | TBA | Noovo | 40 | 18 | Patrice Bélanger | TBA | C$100,000 |
| Czech Republic; Slovakia | Survivor Česko & Slovensko 2026 | 23 February 2026 | TBA | TV Nova; Voyo SK | TBA | 24 | Ondřej Novotný | TBA | 2,500,000 Kč |
| Denmark | Robinson Ekspeditionen 2025 | 1 September 2025 | 16 December 2025 | TV3 | 41 | 20 | Jakob Kjeldbjerg | Anton Basbas Pedersen | 500,000 DKK |
| Finland | Selviytyjät Suomi (season 10) | 31 August 2025 | 14 December 2025 | Nelonen | TBA | 16 | Riku Rantala | Saana Akiola | €30,000 |
| France | Koh-Lanta: Les Reliques du Destin | 3 March 2026 | TBA | TF1 | 40 | 20 | Denis Brogniart | TBA | €100,000 |
| Germany | Survivor 2026 | 23 March 2026 | TBA | Sport1 | 50 | 25 | Florian Weber | TBA | €500,000 |
| Greece | Survivor Greece (season 13) | 11 January 2026 | 21 May 2026 | Skai TV | 69 | 31 | Giorgos Lianos | Stavros Floros | €250,000 |
| Hungary | Survivor – A sziget season 6 | 2 October 2023 | 17 November 2023 | RTL | 39 | 18 | Miklós "Joe" Varga | Viktória Kiss | 20,000,000 Ft |
| Israel | Survivor Caramoan | 29 October 2026 | - | Reshet 13 | 45 | 18 | Guy Zu-Aretz | TBA | ₪1,000,000 |
| Italy | L'isola dei famosi (season 19) | 7 May 2025 | 2 July 2025 | Canale 5 | 57 | 22 | Alberto 'Alvin' Bonato; Vladimir Luxuria | Cristina Plevani | €100,000 |
| Mexico | Survivor México: Héroes y Villanos | 28 April 2025 | 31 August 2025 | Azteca Uno | 126 | 28 | Carlos "Warrior" Guerrero | Sergio Torres | $2,000,000 MXN |
| Netherlands | Expeditie Robinson 2026 | 1 November 2026 | 2027 | RTL 4 | 34 | 20 | Nicolette Kluijver; Edson Da Graça | Camiel Kesbeke | €25,000 |
| Romania | Survivor România Faimoși VS Războinici | 9 January 2026 | TBA | Antena 1 | TBA | 29 | Daniel Pavel | TBA | €100,000 |
| Spain | Supervivientes All Stars (2026) | 10 September 2026 | November 2026 | Telecinco | TBA | TBA | Jorge Javier Vázquez; Laura Madrueño | Asraf | €200,000 |
| Sweden | Robinson 2026 | 30 March 2026 | TBA | TV4 | 42 | 22 | Martin Järborg | TBA | 500,000 SEK |
| Turkey | 2026 Survivor | 1 January 2026 | TBA | TV8 | 35 | TBA | Acun Ilicali; Murat Ceylan | TBA | ₺ 500,000 |
| United States | Survivor 51 | 23 September 2026 | 16 December 2026 | CBS | 26 | 21 | Jeff Probst | TBA | $1,000,000 |

== Other media ==
=== Thrill ride ===
One of the more novel merchandising items has been the interactive Survivor: The Ride thrill ride at California's Great America in Santa Clara, California. The ride includes a rotating platform on which riders are divided into one of four "tribes." As the ride moves along an undulating track, riders can be sprayed by water guns hidden in oversized tribal masks while drums and other familiar Survivor musical accents play in the background. Other theming includes Survivor memorabilia throughout the queue line and other merchandise for sale in nearby gift shops. The ride has since been rethemed as Tiki Twirl.

=== Online games ===
During the first Survivor seasons many online games based on forums were created. More specific Survivor online games appeared later.

In late 2013, a former contestant of the American version of the show, Erik Reichenbach, launched a Kickstarter campaign for a Survivor-styled online mobile app called "Islands of Chaos". The app pits players from all over the world in a battle of challenges and strategy to be the last one standing. If the campaign is successful, the plan is to release the game free of charge on a range of platforms including on Apple and Android devices.

Survivor: Castaway Island, a video game in partnership with Microids is slated for release on 3 October 2023.

=== Parody ===
Beginning on July 8, 2007, a parody of Survivor called Total Drama Island appeared on the Canadian television network Teletoon. This animated show included 22 summer campers who signed up to stay at a five-star resort, which actually turned out to be a cruddy summer camp on an island somewhere in Muskoka, Ontario. The host, Chris McLean, is modeled after Survivor host Jeff Probst. The campers are taken to the island on boats to meet their fellow competitors, being heartbroken at the sight of their wasted summer. The campers were separated into two teams: The "Screaming Gophers" and the "Killer Bass". Every three days there would be a challenge for the campers to face, from jumping off a 1,000-foot (300 m) high cliff into a lake to survival skills. The losing team of each challenge would go to the Bonfire Ceremony the night of the challenge, and vote someone off the team, like Survivor. Each team member still in the game would receive a marshmallow, leaving one team member without one. The member who does not receive a marshmallow (the symbol of life on the island) would have to walk the Dock of Shame and board the Boat of Losers to leave the island, and "Never ever ever ever ever" return (which turned out to be a lie in the episode "No Pain, No Game"). After 12 members of the island were voted off, the teams were merged. The winner receives a check for the C$100,000 and the final marshmallow. The show then ends with Chris thrown off the Dock of Shame. The show aired in 188 countries and also appeared on the channels of Cartoon Network and Jetix. The show became a critical and commercial success and it spun off into a series.

=== Animated adaptation ===
In June 2026, an animated film based on the series was announced from Paramount Animation, in partnership with CBS, with Jeff Probst set to executive produce around an animal take of Survivor.

== See also ==
- List of television show franchises
- Total Drama
- Get Out Alive with Bear Grylls
- Takeshi's Castle
- The Hunger Games
