= Expedition Robinson 2005 =

- Season 9
- Presented by: Robert Aschberg
- No. of days: 47
- No. of castaways: 24
- Winner: Karolina Conrad
- Runner-up: Max Stjernfelt
- Location: Malaysia
- No. of episodes: 13

Release
- Original network: TV3
- Original release: September 10 – December 10, 2005

Season chronology
- ← Previous; 2005 (VIP) Next → 2009

Expedition Robinson: 2005 is the ninth version of Expedition Robinson to air in Sweden and it aired in 2005.

The major twist this season was that the contestants were divided into tribes based on their annual salaries, with the North team being the "rich" team and the South team being the "poor" team. Another twist was that of the change in voting format, all contestants were given thirteen votes that they could use at any time and in any amount. Robert Drakwind, formerly known as Robert Andersson, returned to compete for a third time since 1999 along with his girlfriend, Anna Carin Wase. Both were "jokers" and did not enter the competition until episode 3. Both jokers became "chiefs" of one of the tribes and were given immunity at all pre-merge tribal councils, however from episode 4 on they could be challenged by any member of their tribe for the position of chief. If challenged, the chief and challenger would face off in a duel in which the winner would become chief and the loser would be eliminated from the competition.

The final twist of the season was that of the "Finalist Island". Introduced in a challenge immediately preceding the merge, contestants would compete in a series of duels in which the winner would earn a spot on Finalist Island. The two contestants left on Finalist Island when only seven contestants were left would have immunity until the final four, while the remaining five contestants not on the island would have to compete for the two remaining spots. Karolina and Max were the last two contestants on Finalist Island. Ultimately, Karolina Conrad went on to win the season with a jury vote of 6–5 over Max Stjernfelt.

== Finishing order ==
Contestant	Original Tribes	Episode 5 Tribes	Merged Tribe	Finish
Carolina Pop; 30, London, United Kingdom	South Team			Evacuated; Day 4
Marcus Perlitz; 33, Stockholm	North Team			1st Voted Out; Day 4
Linda Penninger; 32, Stockholm	North Team			2nd Voted Out; Day 8
Ehrling Wahlgren; 58, Ystad	South Team			Left Competition; Day 9
Katarina Göransson; 42, Bromölla	North Team			3rd Voted Out; Day 11
Anna Carin Wase; 22, Stockholm	North Team			Lost Chief Duel; Day 14
Jonas Dahlgren; 31, Uppsala	North Team			4th Voted Out; Day 14
Christian Österberg; 24, Gävle	South Team	South Team		Lost Chief Duel; Day 17
Jacky Pereira; 21, Stockholm	South Team	South Team		5th Voted Out; Day 17
Paula Hallgren; 21, Gothenburg	South Team	South Team		6th Voted Out; Day 21
Rafaella Wallin; 21, Tyresö	South Team	South Team	Robinson	Lost Challenge; Day 22
Patricia Droben; 28, Malmö	North Team	North Team	Robinson	7th Voted Out; 1st Jury Member; Day 25
Emma Lundberg; 23, Landskrona	South Team	South Team	Robinson	8th Voted Out; 2nd Jury Member; Day 29
Robert "Robban" Andersson; 31, Stockholm; Season 3, 3rd Place; Season 7, 13th Place	South Team	South Team	Robinson	9th Voted Out; 3rd Jury Member; Day 33
Chana Grentzelius; 37, Norrköping	South Team	South Team	Robinson	10th Voted Out; 4th Jury Member; Day 36
Anders Kihlström; 43, Gothenburg	North Team	North Team	Robinson	11th Voted Out; 5th Jury Member; Day 40
Lotta Appelin; 24, Höör	South Team	South Team	Robinson	12th Voted Out; 6th Jury Member; Day 44
Malin Eriksson; 30, Stockholm	North Team	North Team	Robinson	Lost Duel; 7th Jury Member; Day 44
Patric "Lillen" Ericson; 34, Falun	North Team	North Team	Robinson	Lost Duel; 8th Jury Member; Day 44
Sasa Radisavljevic; 26, Stockholm	North Team	South Team	Robinson	13th Voted Out; 9th Jury Member; Day 44
Robert Nilsson; 35, Stockholm	South Team	South Team	Robinson	Lost Challenge; 10th Jury Member; Day 45
Tove Berge; 27, Åkersberga	South Team	South Team	Robinson	Lost Challenge; 11th Jury Member; Day 46
Max Stjernfelt; 27, Stockholm	North Team	North Team	Robinson	Runner-Up; Day 47
Karolina Conrad; 23, Gothenburg	North Team	North Team	Robinson	Sole Survivor; Day 47

== The game ==
Episode	Challenges			Eliminated	Vote	Finish
Episode	Finalon	Reward	Immunity	Eliminated	Vote	Finish
Episode 1		None	South Team	Carolina	No Vote	Evacuated; Day 4
Episode 1		None	South Team	Marcus	13-4	1st Voted Out; Day 4
Episode 2		North Team	South Team	Linda	6-3	2nd Voted Out; Day 8
Episode 3		South Team	South Team	Erhling	No Vote	Left Competition; Day 9
Episode 3		South Team	South Team	Katarina	8-0	3rd Voted Out; Day 11
Episode 4		North Team	South Team	Anna Carin	No Vote	Lost Chief Duel; Day 12
Episode 4		North Team	South Team	Jonas	6-5	4th Voted Out; Day 14
Episode 5		South Team	North Team	Christian	No Vote	Lost Chief Duel; Day 17
Episode 5		South Team	North Team	Jacky	14-9-1	4th Voted Out; Day 17
Episode 6		North Team	North Team	Paula	6-0	6th Voted Out; Day 21
Episode 7	Robban, [Tove] Lotta, [Lillen]			Rafaella	No Vote	Lost Challenge; Day 22
Episode 7	Robban, [Tove] Lotta, [Lillen]		Sasa	Patricia	8-2	7th Voted Out; 1st Jury Member; Day 25
Episode 8	Anders, Chana		Robert	Emma	12-8-2	8th Voted Out; 2nd Jury Member; Day 29
Episode 9	Tove, Robert		Lillen	Robban	9-5	9th Voted Out; 3rd Jury Member; Day 33
Episode 10	Sasa, Lotta		Max	Chana	8-6	10th Voted Out; 3rd Jury Member; Day 36
Episode 11	Tove, Max		Robert	Anders	1-0	11th Voted Out; 3rd Jury Member; Day 40
Episode 12	Sasa, Karolina			Lotta	3-1	12th Voted Out; 4th Jury Member; Day 44
Episode 12	Sasa, Karolina		Robert	Malin	No Vote	Lost Challenge; 5th Jury Member; Day 44
Episode 12	Sasa, Karolina		Robert	Lillen	No Vote	Lost Challenge; 6th Jury Member; Day 44
Episode 12	Not Applicable		Robert	Sasa	4-0	13th Voted Out; 7th Jury Member; Day 44
Episode 13			Max	Robert	No vote	Lost Challenge; 8th Jury Member; Day 45
Episode 13			Karolina	Tove	No vote	Lost Challenge; 8th Jury Member; Day 46
Episode 13	Jury Vote			Max	6-5	Runner-Up; Day 47
Episode 13	Jury Vote			Karolina	6-5	Sole Survivor; Day 47

== Voting history ==
	Original Tribes							Tribal Swap			Merged Tribe												
Episode #:	1		2	3		4		5		6	7		8	9	10	11	12			13			
Eliminated:	Carolina; No vote	Marcus; 13/17 votes	Linda; 6/9 votes	Erhling; No vote	Katarina; 8/8 votes	Anna Carin; No vote	Jonas; 6/11 votes	Christian; No vote	Jacky; 14/24 votes	Paula; 6/6 votes	Rafaella; No vote^{1}	Patricia; 8/10 votes	Emma; 12/22 votes	Robban; 9/14 votes	Chana; 8/14 votes	Anders; 1/1 vote	Lotta; 3/4 votes^{2}	Malin; Lillen; No vote^{2}	Sasa; 4/4 votes^{3}	Robert; No vote	Tove; No vote	Max; 5/11 votes	Karolina; 6/11 votoes
Voter	Vote																						
Karolina		Marcus (1)	Jonas (1)		Katarina (1)		Jonas (2)				7th	Patricia (1)	Robban (2)	Robban (2)	Chana (1)	-	Finalon		Sasa (1)	3rd	Won	Jury Vote	
Max		Marcus (1)	Linda (1)		Katarina (1)		-				2nd	Patricia (1)	Robban (2)	Robban (3)	Chana (1)	Finalon			-	1st	Immune	Jury Vote	
Tove									Jacky (1)	-	11th	Finalon							Sasa (2)	2nd	Lost	Max	
Robert									Sasa (2)	Paula (1)	6th	Patricia (1)	Robban (1)	Finalon		Anders (1)	Lotta	Won	Sasa (1)	4th		Max	
Sasa		Marcus (1)	Linda (1)		Katarina (2)		Malin (2)		Jacky (3)	Paula (1)	3rd	-	Robban (1)	Robban (2)	Finalon				-			Max	
Lillen		Marcus (2)	Linda (1)		-		Malin (1)				4th	Finalon		Robban (1)	Anders (2)	-	Lotta	Lost					Karolina
Malin		Marcus (1)	Jonas (1)		-		Jonas (4)				12th	Patricia (2)	Robban (2)	Robban (1)	-	-	Lotta	Lost					Karolina
Lotta									Jacky (3)	Paula (1)	5th	Finalon	Emma (9)	-	Finalon		Robert					Max	
Anders		Marcus (2)	-		Katarina (1)	Won	Malin (1)				10th	Patricia (2)	Finalon		Chana (6)	-							Karolina
Chana									Jacky (2)	Paula (1)	13th	Patricia (1)	Finalon		Anders (4)								Karolina
Robban	Not in game							Won	Sasa (3)	-	1st	Finalon	Emma (3)	Max (5)									Karolina
Emma									Lotta (1)	-	8th	Anders (1)	Lotta (2)										Karolina
Patricia		Marcus (1)	Linda (1)		Katarina (1)		-				9th	Anders (1)										Max	
Rafaella									Jacky (3)	Paula (2)	14th												
Paula									Jacky (2)	-													
Jacky									Sasa (4)														
Christian								Lost															
Jonas		-	Linda (2)		-		Malin (1)																
Anna Carin	Not in game				Katarina (2)	Lost																	
Katarina		Marcus (2)	Jonas (1)		-																		
Erhling																							
Linda		Marcus (2)	-																				
Marcus		Lillen (4)																					
Carolina																							

^1 Just prior to the merge the remaining contestants had to take part in a race to the merge meal table. The two contestants sitting at the head of the table would be the first to go to the "Finalon" island, where they would be immune from tribal council. In addition they could each select one other contestant to join them. The last contestant to reach the table would be left without a chair and eliminated from the game.
^2 The last four members of the Robinson tribe not on Finalon island took part in a vote and sudden death challenge where only the last remaining member after the vote and challenge would remain in the game.
^3 In the final tribal council of the season all remaining contestants reverted to the Robinson tribe and only Robert, who won the last immunity challenge, was immune from the vote.

=== Votes Used ===
Contestant	Tribal 1	Tribal 2	Tribal 3	Tribal 4	Tribal 5	Tribal 6	Tribal 7	Tribal 8	Tribal 9	Tribal 10	Tribal 11	Tribal 12	Final
Karolina	1	1	1	2	-	-	1	2	2	1	0	1	1 Unused
Max	1	1	1	0	-	-	1	2	3	1	-	0	3 Unused
Tove	-	-	-	-	1	0	-	-	-	-	-	2	10 Unused
Robert	-	-	-	-	2	1	1	1	-	-	1	1	6 Unused
Sasa	1	1	2	2	3	1	0	1	2	-	-	0	0 Unused
Lillen	2	1	0	1	-	-	-	-	1	2	0	4 Unused	
Malin	1	1	0	4	-	-	2	2	1	0	0	2 Unused	
Lotta	-	-	-	-	3	1	-	9	0	-	-	0 Unused	
Anders	2	0	1	1	-	-	2	-	-	6	0	1 Unused	
Chana	-	-	-	-	2	1	1	-	-	4	5 Unused		
Robban			-	-	3	0	-	3	5	0 Unused			
Emma	-	-	-	-	1	0	1	2	9 Unused				
Patricia	1	1	1	0	-	-	1	9 Unused					
Rafaella	-	-	-	-	3	2	8 Unused						
Paula	-	-	-	-	2	0	11 Unused						
Jacky	-	-	-	-	4	9 Unused							
Christian	-	-	-	-	13 Unused								
Jonas	0	2	0	1	10 Unused								
Anna Carin			2	9 Unused									
Katarina	2	1	0	10 Unused									
Erhling	-	-	13 Unused										
Linda	2	0	11 Unused										
Marcus	4	9 Unused											
Carolina	13 Unused												
