= Survivor – A sziget season 6 =

Survivor – A sziget
- Season 6
- Presented by: Miklós "Joe" Varga
- No. of days: 39
- No. of castaways: 18
- Winner: Viktória Kiss
- Runner-up: Zsombor Pusztai
- Location: Caramoan, Philippines

Release
- Original network: RTL
- Original release: October 2 – November 17, 2023

Season chronology
- ← Previous; Season 5

Survivor – A sziget: Generációk harca (transl. "Survivor - A sziget: Battle of the Generations") is the sixth season of the Hungarian reality television series Survivor – A sziget.

The season returns to Caramoan in the Philippines where 18 Hungarians are split off into 3 tribes of 6 divided into generations where they compete in challenges to win rewards and immunity to avoid tribal council where in the end, the winner receives the grand prize of Ft.20,000,000 and the title of Sole Survivor. The season is presented by Miklós "Joe" Varga and for the first time, aired on RTL premiering on 2 October 2023.

== Contestants ==
List of Survivor - A sziget (season 6) contestants
Contestant	Original Tribe	Dissolved Tribe	Swapped Tribe	Cycle 5 Tribe	Merged Tribe	Voted Out	Island of the Dead	Finish
Zümrüt "Zümi" Öleş; 34, Budapest	Karagatan					1st Voted Out; Day 5		18th Day 5
Dóra Poni Kőszegi; 28, Dunakeszi	Karagatan					2nd Voted Out; Day 10		17th Day 10
Emma Fabó; 46, Dunavarsány	Jarakay					3rd Voted Out; Day 10		16th Day 10
Zsombi Szarka; Returned to Game	Buhawi	Buhawi				Lost Duel; Day 13		
Gergő Bodnár; 32, Tiszabábolna	Karagatan	Buhawi	Buhawi			5th Voted Out; Day 16		15th Day 16
Nóra Czupek; 29, Balatonakarattya	Buhawi	Buhawi	Buhawi			Left Competition; Day 17		14th Day 17
Olivér Németh; 28, Budapest	Karagatan	Buhawi	Buhawi	Buhawi		Lost Challenge; Day 20	Lost Challenge; 1st Jury Member; Day 21	13th Day 21
Attila Bojnár; 54, Balatonfüred	Jarakay	Jarakay	Jarakay	Jarakay		6th Voted Out; Day 19	Lost Challenge; 2nd Jury Member; Day 23	12th Day 23
Wendy Perez; 24, Budapest	Buhawi	Buhawi	Jarakay	Jarakay		Lost Challenge; Day 20	Lost Challenge; 3rd Jury Member; Day 27	11th Day 27
János Kiss; 30, Nyíregyháza	Karagatan	Jarakay	Jarakay	Jarakay	Sama-Sama	7th Voted Out; Day 21	Lost Challenge; 4th Jury Member; Day 27	10th Day 27
Attila "Simi" Simon; Returned to game	Jarakay	Jarakay	Jarakay	Jarakay	Sama-Sama	8th Voted Out; Day 26	Won Duel; Day 27	
Erika Zera-Albert; 50, Budapest	Jarakay	Jarakay	Jarakay	Jarakay	Sama-Sama	Left Competition; Day 28		9th Day 28
Anett Martin; Returned to Game	Buhawi	Buhawi	Buhawi	Buhawi	Sama-Sama	Eliminated; Day 24	Won Draw; Day 28 (Note: Due to Erika Qutting the game, Anett, János and Wendy had their names be put into a bag and whoever's name was drawn returned to the game. Anett's name was pulled and she returned to the game.)	
Zsombi Szarka; 24, Budapest	Buhawi	Buhawi		Buhawi	Sama-Sama	9th Voted Out; 5th Jury Member; Day 30		8th Day 30
Vivien Makra; 28, Budapest	Karagatan	Jarakay	Buhawi	Buhawi	Sama-Sama	10th Voted Out; 6th Jury Member; Day 31		7th Day 31
Attila "Simi" Simon; 40, Budapest	Jarakay	Jarakay	Jarakay	Jarakay	Sama-Sama	11th Voted Out; 7th Jury Member; Day 32		6th Day 32
Kornél Tomán; 37, Vác	Jarakay	Jarakay	Jarakay	Jarakay	Sama-Sama	Left Competition; 8th Jury Member; Day 34		5th Day 34
Tamás Korábián; 22, Cluj-Napoca, Romania	Buhawi	Buhawi	Buhawi	Buhawi	Sama-Sama	Lost Challenge; 9th Jury Member; Day 38		4th Day 38
Anett Martin; 25, Budakeszi	Buhawi	Buhawi	Buhawi	Buhawi	Sama-Sama	Lost Challenge; 10th Jury Member; Day 38		3rd Day 38
Zsombor Pusztai; 25, Budapest	Buhawi	Buhawi	Buhawi	Buhawi	Sama-Sama	Runner-up; Day 39		2nd Day 39
Viktória Kiss; 39, Győr	Jarakay	Jarakay	Jarakay	Jarakay	Sama-Sama	Sole Survivor; Day 39		1st Day 39

== Voting history ==
Cycle	1	2		3	4	5		6		7	8			9	10	11	12	13	
Tribe	Karagatan	Karagatan	Jarakay	Buhawi	Buhawi	Buhawi	Jarakay	Buhawi	Jarakay	Sama-Sama	Sama-Sama	Sama-Sama	Sama-Sama	Sama-Sama	Sama-Sama	Sama-Sama	Sama-Sama	Sama-Sama	
Eliminated	Zümi	Dóra	Emma	Zsombi	Gergő	Nóra	Attila	Olivér	Wendy	János	Anett	Simi	Zera	Zsombi	Vivien	Simi	Kornél	Tamás	Anett
Votes	3-2-1	3-2	5-1	4-4; Duel (Note: As Wendy and Zsombi received the same number of votes, they competed in a duel to see who would be eliminated. Zsombi lost the duel to Wendy.)	4-3	0	4-3	Challenge	Challenge	7-2-1	0 (Note: For winning the reward challenge, Zsombor was given cupcakes to hand out to his tribunates. However, there were only enough for all but one of the contestants. The contestant who did nOt receive the cupcake was eliminated from the game.)	7-2 (Note: As Anett won a reward on the Island of the Dead, she was allowed to cast a vote at tribal council.)	0	2-2; Duel (Note: As Kornél and Zsombi were tied for the number of votes received, they competed in a duel to see who would be eliminated. Zsombi lost the duel to Kornél.)	3-1	3-3; Duel (Note: Due to a tie in the votes, Tamás and Simi competed in a duel to see who would be eliminated. Simi lost the duel to Tamás and was eliminated.)	0	0	
Voter	Vote																		
Viktória			Emma				Wendy			János		Simi		Zsombi		Tamás		Immune	
Zsombor				Wendy	Gergő					János		Simi			Vivien	Simi		Won	
Anett				Wendy	Gergő					János		Simi			Vivien	Simi		Lost	
Tamás				Wendy	Gergő					János		Simi		Kornél		Simi		Lost	
Kornél			Emma				Attila			János		Simi		Zsombi		Tamás			
Simi			Emma				Attila			Tamás		Zsombor			Vivien	Tamás			
Vivien	Olivér	Olivér			Gergő					Anett		Zsombor			Anett				
Zsombi				Wendy						János		Simi		Kornél					
Zera			Emma				Wendy			János		Simi							
János	Olivér	Dóra					Attila			Anett									
Wendy				Zsombi			Attila												
Olivér	Zümi	Dóra		Zsombi	Zsombor														
Attila			Emma				Wendy												
Nóra				Zsombi	Zsombor														
Gergő	Zümi	Dóra		Zsombi	Zsombor														
Emma			Simi																
Dóra	Zümi	Olivér																	
Zümi	Dóra																		

Jury vote
Cycle	13	
Day	39	
Finalist	Viktória	Zsombor
Vote	8–2	
Juror	Vote	
Anett		Yes
Tamás		Yes
Kornél	Yes	
Simi	Yes	
Vivien	Yes	
Zsombi	Yes	
János	Yes	
Wendy	Yes	
Attila	Yes	
Olivér	Yes	
