= Robban Andersson =

Swedish television personality (born 1974)

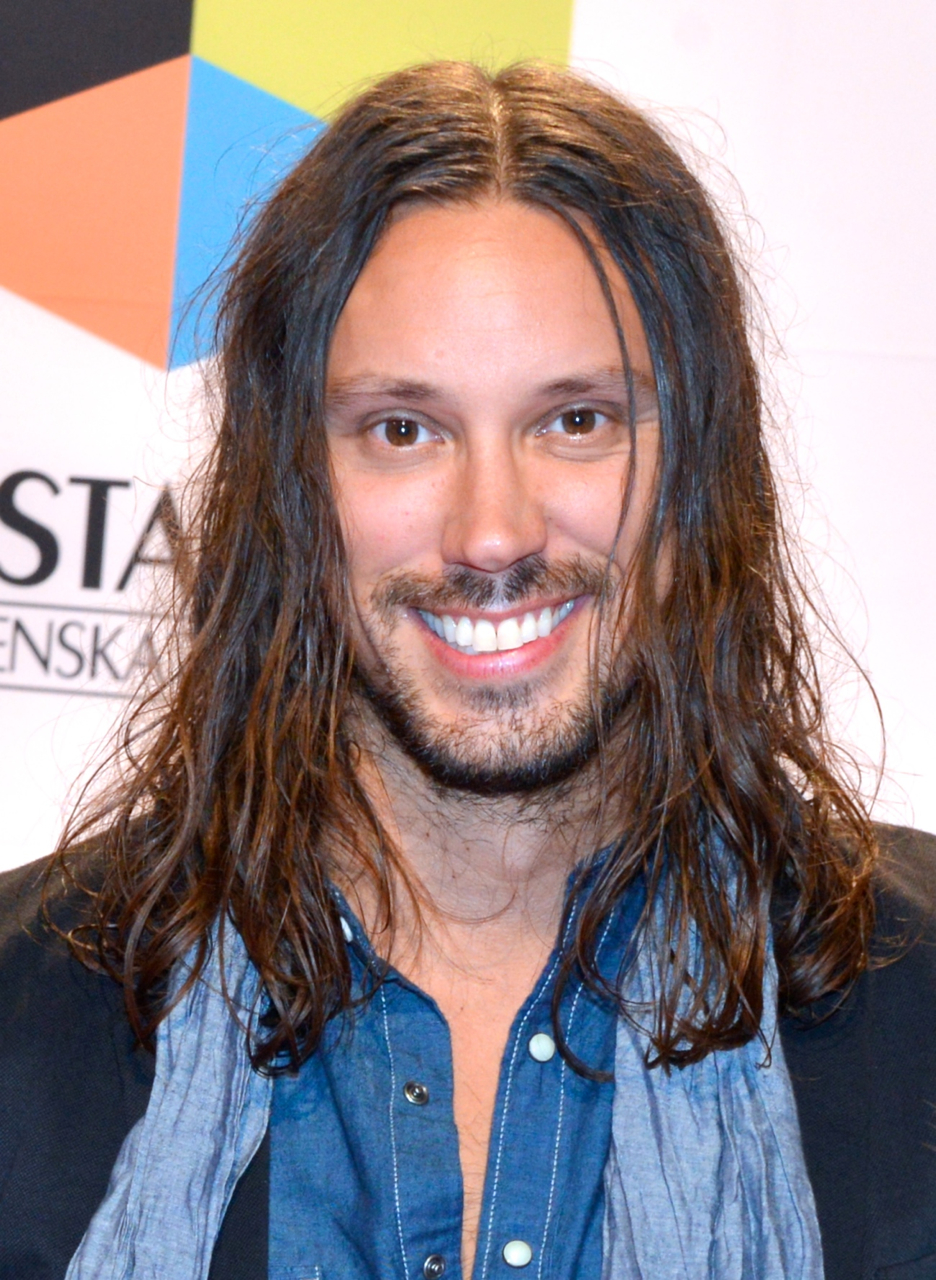
- Andersson in 2013
- Born: 3 April 1974 (age 52); Gällivare, Sweden
- Known for: Television personality

Jan Robert Andersson (born 3 April 1974), commonly known as Robban Andersson or Robinson-Robban, is a Swedish television personality who has participated in Expedition Robinson (the Swedish original to the US Survivor series) several times from 1999 until 2012. He has also participated in the celebrity version of Big Brother and in the Gladiatorerna.

== Career ==
Andersson participated in Expedition Robinson several times between 1999 and 2012. The shows were broadcast on Sveriges Television and later on TV4. He has also worked as a sports teacher, as a reporter at Se & Hör, and in a mine. Andersson made his television debut in Expedition Robinson 1999 on 25 September 1999. He has since participated in the series in 2003, 2005 and 2012. During the 2012 series, Robinson: Revanschen, Andersson set the world record for the most days spent on Survivor islands by amassing a total 126 days, beating the American contestant Rob "Boston Rob" Mariano's previous record of 117 days. In the same season he had his best result in the competition by placing second in the finale behind Mariana "Mirre" Hammarling. In 2012, he participated in the talk show Breaking News med Filip och Fredrik on Kanal5, on which he graded the different Expedition Robinson hosts over the years. Andersson made headlines when he appeared on the live Expedition Robinson finale in 2003 painted completely in blue, grabbed the winner's statuette and ate his ballot paper with his vote for the winner.

Andersson has also taken part in the TV4 show Gladiatorerna and participated in the Swedish celebrity version of Big Brother in 2002 on Kanal5. He participated in Talang 2010 under the alias "Mr Glupsk"; his talent was that he could eat thirteen sausages in two minutes.

In 2016, he participated in Realitystjärnorna på godset alongside other reality series stars such as Victoria Silvstedt and Meral Tasbas, the show was broadcast on TV3.

== Personal life ==
He is married to Simone Brandstedt, and has two children from a previous relationship.
