= Survivor Pakistan =

Pakistan's version of the show Survivor

- No. of days: 39
- No. of castaways: 16
- Winner: Muhammad Ziad
- Runner-up: Ali Asghar
- Location: Gilgit-Baltistan, Pakistan

Release
- Original network: PTV; ARY; TVOne
- Original release: August 2006 – November 2006

Survivor Pakistan is the Pakistani version of Survivor. Due to the low ratings, the show only ran for one season, that aired from August to November 2006.

Due to the culture of Pakistan, only men were allowed to take part in this season which caused some protest within Pakistan. Unlike most seasons of Survivor that take place in relatively warm conditions, this season took place in a cold secluded mountain range in Pakistan.

== Season summary ==
The contestants this season were split into two tribes, the Ishkuman tribe, and the Karambar tribe. During the pre-merge portion of the season, the Karambar tribe proved to be the stronger of the two tribes, winning four of the six immunity challenges. Following the merge, the former Ishkuman tribe members were on the outs and were voted out of the merged tribe before most of the former Karambar members. The finalists for this season were Ahmed Wali, Abdul Waheed, Ali Asghar, and Muhammad Ziad with the winner being Muhammad Ziad.

== Finishing order ==
| Contestant | Original Tribes | Merged Tribe | Finish |
|---|---|---|---|
| Hammad Judoon; 24, Rawalpindi | Ishkuman | | 1st Voted Out; Day 3 |
| Wajid Ali; 21, Rawalpindi | Ishkuman | | 2nd Voted Out; Day 6 |
| Sardar Khurrum; 26, Rawalpindi | Karambar | | 3rd Voted Out; Day 9 |
| Abdul Waheed; 19, Karachi | Ishkuman | | 4th Voted Out; Day 12 |
| Atif Hussain; 24, Karachi | Karambar | | 5th Voted Out; Day 15 |
| Arbab Hameed Khan; 20, Karachi | Ishkuman | | 6th Voted Out; Day 18 |
| Mohammad Waqar; 22, Rawalpindi | Ishkuman | Merged Tribe | 7th Voted Out; 1st Jury Member; Day 21 |
| Abdul Karim; 24, Rawalpindi | Karambar | Merged Tribe | 8th Voted Out; 2nd Jury Member; Day 24 |
| Saud Dar; 20, Lahore | Ishkuman | Merged Tribe | 9th Voted Out; 3rd Jury Member; Day 27 |
| Adeeb Gulrez; 21, Rawalpindi | Ishkuman | Merged Tribe | 10th Voted Out; 4th Jury Member; Day 30 |
| Hamid Ali Shah; 33, Lahore | Ishkuman | Merged Tribe | 11th Voted Out; 5th Jury Member; Day 33 |
| Asim Yaqoob; 22, Faisalabad | Karambar | Merged Tribe | 12th Voted Out; 6th Jury Member; Day 36 |
| Umer Khayyam; 25, Lahore | Karambar | Merged Tribe | 13th Voted Out; 7th Jury Member; Day 38 |
| Ahmed Wali; 30, Karachi | Karambar | Merged Tribe | 2nd Runner-Up; Day 39 |
| Ali Asghar; 28, Karachi | Karambar | Merged Tribe | Runner- Up; Day 39 |
| Muhammad Ziad; 22, Lahore | Karambar | Merged Tribe | Sole Survivor; Day 39 |
