= Wyspa przetrwania =

- Season 2
- Presented by: Damian Michałowski
- No. of days: 30
- No. of castaways: 16
- Winner: Katarzyna Cebula
- Runner-up: Paweł Poręba
- Location: Yasawa Islands, Fiji
- No. of episodes: 10

Release
- Original network: Polsat
- Original release: 8 September – 10 November 2017

Season chronology
- ← Previous; Wyprawa Robinson

Wyspa przetrwania (lit. 'Island of Survival'; 2017) is the second season of the Polish version of Survivor, and the first to air since 2004.

This was the second version of the show, but the first to use the format of Koh-Lanta, instead of the previous incarnation, which used the format of Expedition Robinson. This season took place on the Yasawa Islands, in the country of Fiji, and it was aired on Polsat. Sixteen contestants from all over the country took part in the competition.

The season premiered on 8 September 2017 and concluded on 10 November 2017 where Katarzyna Cebula won against Paweł Poręba in a 6-1 jury vote to win the grand prize of 150,000 zł, and to be crowned as the Sole Survivor.

== Contestants ==
Contestant	Original Tribe	Swapped Tribe	Merged Tribe	Finish
Ewa Orzechowska; Returned to Game	Yakavi			1st Voted Out; Day 3
Ewa Chojnowska; 30, Warsaw	Yakavi			Medically evacuated Day 5
Grzegorz Morawski; 63, Nowa Wieś	Yakavi			2nd Voted Out; Day 5
Anna Urbańska; 21, Wrocław	Mataka			3rd Voted Out; Day 8
Ewa "Fitella" Orzechowska; 30, Elbląg	Yakavi			Lost Challenge; Day 10
Anna Rybak; 26, Kalisz	Yakavi	Mataka		4th Voted Out; Day 12
Bartosz Czapiewski; 29, Wrocław	Yakavi	Yakavi		5th Voted Out; Day 15
Justyna Gokiert-Skrentna; 40, Złotów	Mataka	Yakavi		Eliminated; Day 17 (Note: Just before the tribe merge, two ambassadors from each tribe (Maciej Kl. and Daniel) met on a secluded beach and had to eliminate one tribe member from either tribe. They chose Justyna.)
Karolina Grychnik; 29, Bytom	Mataka	Mataka	Vuku	6th Voted Out; 1st jury member Day 18
Piotr Krystkiewicz; 31, Szczecin	Yakavi	Mataka	Vuku	7th Voted Out; 2nd jury member Day 21
Julia Maciuszek; 18, Wrocław	Yakavi	Yakavi	Vuku	Eliminated; 3rd jury member Day 21
Paweł "Farmer" Bodzianny; 35, Piaseczna	Mataka	Yakavi	Vuku	8th Voted Out; 4th jury member Day 24
Maciej "Klotzek" Klotz; 45, Bydgoszcz	Yakavi	Yakavi	Vuku	9th Voted Out; 5th jury member Day 27
Daniel Wiśniowski; 30, Kraków	Mataka	Mataka	Vuku	Lost Challenge; 6th jury member Day 28
Maciej "Maczo" Kuśmierz; 25, Wołomin	Mataka	Yakavi	Vuku	10th Voted Out; 7th jury member Day 29
Paweł Poręba; 28, Kraków	Mataka	Mataka	Vuku	Runner-up; Day 30
Katarzyna Cebula; 31, Mieleszyn	Mataka	Mataka	Vuku	Sole Survivor; Day 30
