= Extreme Azerbaijan =

- Presented by: Emin Abbasov
- No. of days: 45
- No. of castaways: 12
- Winner: Kemal Cenk İçten
- Runner-up: Aygün Kazımova
- Location: Namibia

Release
- Original network: Space TV
- Original release: June 4, 2011 – 2012

Additional information
- Filming dates: May 24 – June 7, 2011

Extreme Azerbaijan is the Azerbaijani version of the game show franchise Survivor, whose only season was broadcast on Space TV starting on June 4, 2011. The show took place in the country of Namibia. Twelve celebrities took part in the competition. These twelve celebrities were divided into two teams of six called the blue and yellow teams. Filming for the show wrapped on June 7, 2011, after fourteen days of competition. The identity of the winner and how they may have won is not currently known, but what is known is that the contestants took part in such activities as mountain climbing, parachuting, scuba diving, and zorbing. The main host for the show was Emin Əhmədov (Emin Abbasov).

== Finishing order ==
Contestant	Famous For	Tribe	Finish
Malik Kalantarli	Rapper	Blue Team	
Dayanat İsmayılov	Businessman	Yellow Team	
Günel Alakbarova	Singer	Blue Team	
Lamiyya Rahimova	Television host	Blue Team	
Letafet Alekperova	Television host	Yellow Team	
Nadir Qafarzadeh	Singer	Yellow Team	
Naila Dadaşova	Dancer	Blue Team	
Nurlan Azizbeyli	Singer	Yellow Team	
Rüfat Axundov	Singer	Blue Team	
Xanım Manafzadeh	Model	Yellow Team	
Aygün Kazımova	Artist	Yellow Team	Runner-up
Kemal Cenk	Turkish Producer	Blue Team	Winner
