= Into the Shangri-La =

Chinese television series

- No. of days: 30
- No. of castaways: 18
- Winner: Sun Village
- Runner-up: Moon Village
- Location: Yunnan, China
- No. of episodes: 24

Release
- Original network: China Central Television
- Original release: 2001 – 2001

Into the Shangri-La (Chinese: 走入香格里拉; pinyin: zǒu rù Xiānggélǐlā) is the Chinese version of the show Survivor, that was aired in late 2001 on China Central Television, as well as many small local channels. Despite the ratings being initially good, the show was not brought back for a second season.

== Season summary ==
The show took place in the mountain regions of China and lasted for thirty days. The contestants for that season were divided into two "villages". The "Sun Village", led by Rui Yang from day three to day twenty-three and then by Fuqi Liu from day twenty-four until the end of the competition, had red as its team color. The "Moon Village", led by Zhen Wu, had yellow as its team color. Throughout the competition, the two teams competed against one another in a series of challenges while trying to survive as they traveled through many different villages in the mountain ranges they had been stranded in. Unlike other versions of Survivor, there were no tribal councils and no one was voted out or eliminated. On day twenty-three, Rui Yang and Guang Yang decided to leave the competition as they did not like the way the native villagers that hosted them were being treated. On day thirty, the contestants took part in their final team challenge, which was won by the Sun village.

== Finishing order ==
Contestant	Tribe	Finish
Guang Yang	Sun Village	Quit; Day 23
Rui Yang	Sun Village	Quit; Day 23
Xing Xiang	Moon Village	Evacuated; Day ?
Xiaoyun Jin	Moon Village	Ejected; Day ?
Anlong Wang	Moon Village	Lost Final Competition; Day 30
Ating Wei	Moon Village	Lost Final Competition; Day 30
Jiongrong Pan 55, Hong Kong	Moon Village	Lost Final Competition; Day 30
Nan Zhang	Moon Village	Lost Final Competition; Day 30
Xue Wang	Moon Village	Lost Final Competition; Day 30
Yang Yu 29, Shanghai	Moon Village	Lost Final Competition; Day 30
Zhen Wu	Moon Village	Lost Final Competition; Day 30
Aye Shaxia	Sun Village	Won Final Competition; Day 30
Fuqi Liu	Sun Village	Won Final Competition; Day 30
Hai-Xia Chen 19, Hunan	Sun Village	Won Final Competition; Day 30
Ming Ning	Sun Village	Won Final Competition; Day 30
Mingkun Wang	Sun Village	Won Final Competition; Day 30
Xueqin Wang	Sun Village	Won Final Competition; Day 30
Yuanzheng Huang	Sun Village	Won Final Competition; Day 30
