= Robinsonekspedisjonen 2009 =

- Season 2009
- Presented by: Christer Falck
- No. of days: 47
- No. of castaways: 20
- Winner: Lina Iversen
- Runner-up: Christian Flotvik
- Location: Malaysia
- No. of episodes: 14

Release
- Original network: TV3
- Original release: September 6 – December 6, 2009

Season chronology
- ← Previous; 2008 Next → 2010

Robinsonekspedisjonen: 2009 is the ninth season of the Norwegian version of the Swedish show Expedition Robinson. It premiered on 6 September 2009 and aired until 6 December 2009.

== Season summary ==
The major twist this season was that of Team X, a team of contestants that had previously been eliminated. The formation of Team X started with a fake elimination of two players in a challenge in episode one. Two more players were fake eliminated in episode one when both tribe leaders were told that they had to choose one member of their tribe to eliminate. In episode 3, Peder was fake eliminated in a duel against Kristoffer. Following the duel Kristoffer swapped tribes. The final two members of Team X joined when in episode 4 Team X competed in a challenge against North team and South team. North team finished last in the challenge and as a result was eliminated, however, Team X was told that they could save one member of the North team from elimination. Team X chose to save Iris, which meant that she then became part of Team X. Severin also became part of Team X as the North team decided to give him immunity before the challenge. From episode 5 until the merge, South team and Team X competed in challenges against each other. Following the merge, Peder was ejected from the game for faking an injury. As the game progressed, the original South team members began to pick off what was left of Team X until only South team members remained in the game.

Like the season that preceded it, this season had a final three instead of a final four. The last three players faced off in two challenges in order to determine the finalists. Ultimately, it was Lina Iversen who won the season over Christian Flotvik with a jury vote of 5-2.

== Finishing order ==
Contestant	Original Tribes	Episode 2 Tribes	Episode 3 Tribes	Episode 5 Tribes	Merged Tribe	Finish
Kathrine Pehrsson; Returned to Team X	South Team					Lost Challenge; Day 1
Peder Vilnes; Returned to Team X	North Team					Lost Challenge; Day 1
Marita Olaussen; Returned to Team X	North Team					Eliminated by Christen; Day 2
Tommy Lankut; Returned to Team X	South Team					Eliminated by Francois; Day 2
Torhild Reinholtz; 39, Larvik	South Team					1st Voted Out; Day ?
Camilla Grøtness; 36, Larvik	South Team	South Team				2nd Voted Out; Day ?
Dennis Kakis; Returned to Team X	South Team	South Team	South Team			Lost Duel; Day ?
Halla Osman; 21, Skien	North Team	North Team	North Team			3rd Voted Out; Day ?
Espen Aalberg; 34, Hadeland	North Team	North Team	North Team			Lost Challenge; Day ?
Christen Gran; 36, Larvik	North Team	North Team	North Team			Lost Challenge; Day ?
Sandra Lura; 23, Sandnes	North Team	North Team	North Team			Lost Challenge; Day ?
Astrid Dyson; 24, Ås	North Team	North Team	North Team			Lost Challenge; Day ?
Marita Olaussen; Returned to Game	North Team	Team X	Team X			4th Voted Out; Day ?
Tommy Lankut; 37, Rælingen	South Team	Team X	Team X	Team X		Left Competition; Day ?
Dennis Kakis; 24, Oslo	South Team	South Team	Team X	Team X		5th Voted Out; Day ?
Marita Olaussen; 25, Sandefjord	North Team	Team X	Team X	Team X		6th Voted Out; Day ?
Peder Vilnes; 22, Tønsberg	North Team	Team X	Team X	Team X	Robinson	Ejected; Day ?
Iris Veiseth; 36, Skjervøy	North Team	North Team	North Team	Team X	Robinson	7th Voted Out; 1st Jury Member; Day ?
Francois Elsafadi; 36, Larvik	South Team	South Team	South Team	South Team	Robinson	8th Voted Out; 2nd Jury Member; Day ?
Pål Synnes; 30, Bergen	South Team	South Team	South Team	South Team	Robinson	9th Voted Out; 3rd Jury Member; Day ?
Kathrine Pehrsson; 25, Jevnaker	South Team	Team X	Team X	Team X	Robinson	10th Voted Out; 4th Jury Member; Day ?
Severin Meiland; 41, Bærum	North Team	North Team	North Team	Team X	Robinson	11th Voted Out; 5th Jury Member; Day ?
Kristoffer Karthum; 25, Oslo	North Team	North Team	South Team	South Team	Robinson	12th Voted Out; 6th Jury Member; Day ?
Marte Antonsen; 26, Bodø	South Team	South Team	South Team	South Team	Robinson	Lost Challenge; 7th Jury Member; Day ?
Christian Flotvik; 22, Oslo	South Team	South Team	South Team	South Team	Robinson	Runner-Up; Day 47
Lina Iversen; 26, Lillehammer	South Team	South Team	South Team	South Team	Robinson	Sole Survivor; Day 47

== The game ==
Air date	Challenges		Eliminated	Vote	Finish
Air date	Reward	Immunity	Eliminated	Vote	Finish
6 September 2009	None	North Team	Torhild	5-3	1st Voted Out; Day ?
13 September 2009	North Team	North Team	Camilla	6-1	2nd Voted Out; Day ?
20 September 2009	South Team	South Team	Halla^{1}	1-0	3rd Voted Out; Day ?
27 September 2009	South Team	South Team	North Team^{2}	Lost Challenge	Eliminated; Day ?
27 September 2009	South Team	Team X^{2}	Marita	4-2	4th Voted Out; Day ?
4 October 2009	South Team	South Team	Tommy^{3}	No; Vote	Left Competition; Day ?
4 October 2009	South Team	South Team	Dennis	5-1	5th Voted Out; Day ?
11 October 2009	South Team	South Team	Marita	3-3-2-1^{5}	6th Voted Out; Day ?
18 October 2009	None	Kristoffer	Peder	No; Vote	Ejected; Day ?
25 October 2009	Francois, [Katherine, Severin]	Christian	Iris	5-3^{5}	7th Voted Out; 1st Jury Member; Day ?
1 November 2009	Kristoffer	Christian	Francois	4-3^{6}	8th Voted Out; 2nd Jury Member; Day ?
8 November 2009	Katherine, [Marte]	Kristoffer	Pål	0-0-2-3-3-4^{7}	9th Voted Out; 3rd Jury Member; Day ?
15 November 2009	Lina, [Kristoffer]	Severin	Katherine	4-1^{8}	10th Voted Out; 4th Jury Member; Day ?
22 November 2009	None	None	Severin	No; Vote	Lost Duel; 5th Jury Member; Day ?
22 November 2009	None	None	Kristoffer	3-2^{9}	11th Voted Out; 6th Jury Member; Day ?
29 November 2009	Recap Episode				
6 December 2009	None	Christian^{10}	Marte	No Vote	Lost Challenge; 7th Jury Member; Day ?
6 December 2009	None	Lina^{10}	Marte	No Vote	Lost Challenge; 7th Jury Member; Day ?
6 December 2009	Jury Vote		Christian	5-2	Runner-Up
6 December 2009	Jury Vote		Lina	5-2	Sole Survivor

^Note 1: In a twist, Espen, the person who initially received the most votes, was the only person allowed to vote at tribal council.
^Note 2: As North Team had lost both immunity challenges, the entire team was eliminated. For losing the first of the two challenges, Team X had to go tribal council.
^Note 3: Following Tommy‘s withdraw from the game, Marita re-entered in his place.
^Note 4: As Marte and Peder each received three votes, they had to compete in a dule to determine who would stay.
^Note 5: Francois came last in the immunity challenge and lost his right to vote.
^Note 6: Pål came last in the immunity challenge and lost his right to vote.
^Note 7: Katherine came last in the immunity challenge and lost her right to vote.
^Note 8: The contestants were voting for two players that they wanted to stay in the game. As Pål and Katherine each received zero votes, they faced off in a duel in order to determine who would stay.
^Note 9: Kristoffer won an extra vote after winning the duel against Severin.
^Note 10: The final three contestants competed in two challenges in order to determine the final two.

== Voting history ==
	Original Tribes		Post Duel	South vs Team X					Merged Tribe									
Episode:	1	2	3	4		5		6	7	8	9	10	11	12		13		
Eliminated:	Torhild; 5/8 votes	Camilla; 6/7 votes	Halla; 1/1 vote^{1}	North Team; No vote^{2}	Marita; 4/6 votes	Tommy; No vote^{3}	Dennis; 5/6 votes	Marita; 3/9 votes	Peder; No vote^{4}	Iris; 5/8 votes^{5}	Francois; 4/7 votes^{6}	Pål; 0/12 votes^{7},^{8}	Katherine; 4/5 votes^{9}	Severin; No vote	Kristoffer; 3/5 votes^{10}	Marte; No vote	Christian; 2/7 votes	Lina; 5/7 votes
Voter	Vote																	
Lina	Torhild	Camilla		First						Iris	Francois	Marte ?	Katherine		Kristoffer		Jury Vote	
Christian	Torhild	Camilla		First						Iris	Francois	Kristoffer ?	Katherine		Kristoffer		Jury Vote	
Marte	Torhild	Camilla		First						Kristoffer	Francois	Lina ?	Katherine		Kristoffer			Lina
Kristoffer				First						Iris	Francois	Lina; Marte	Katherine	Won	Marte; Marte		Christian	
Severin			~~Espen~~	Third	Marita		Dennis	Iris; Marita		Iris	Kristoffer		Kristoffer	Lost				Lina
Katherine	In Exile			Second	Marita		Dennis	Marita; Peder		Kristoffer	Marte	Severin; Severin						Lina
Pål	Francois	Camilla		First						Iris		? ?						Lina
Francois	Torhild	Camilla		First							Marte						Christian	
Iris			~~Espen~~	Third			Dennis	Peder		Kristoffer								Lina
Peder	In Exile			Second	Marita		Dennis	Severin; Marita										
Marita	In Exile			Second	Severin		Dennis	Severin; Peder										
Dennis	Torhild	Camilla	In Exile	Second	Marita		Marita											
Tommy	In Exile			Second	Dennis													
Astrid			~~Espen~~	Third														
Christen			~~Espen~~	Third														
Espen			~~Christen~~; Halla	Third														
Sandra			~~Espen~~	Third														
Halla			~~Espen~~															
Camilla	Francois	Marte																
Torhild	Francois																	

^1 In a twist, at the third tribal council the person who initially received the most votes would then vote to eliminate a player.

^2 As the North Team lost both immunity challenges, the entire team was eliminated with the exception of Iris and Severin.

^3 Following Tommy's voluntary exit, Marita was allowed to return to the game.

^4 Peder was ejected for faking an injury.

^5 Francois came in last at the immunity challenge and lost his right to vote.

^6 Pål came last in the immunity challenge and lost his right to vote.

^7 Severin came last in the immunity challenge and lost his right to vote.

^8 Each contestant voted for the two people or one person(worth two votes) that they wanted to keep in the game.

^9 Katherine came last in the immunity challenge and lost her right to vote.

^10 Kristoffer won a second vote following his victory against Severin in the duel.
