= Robinsonekspedisjonen 2008 =

- Season 2008
- Presented by: Christer Falck
- No. of days: 47
- No. of castaways: 23
- Winner: Tom André Tveitan
- Runner-up: Britt Carin Jonassen
- Location: Seribuat, Johor, Malaysia
- No. of episodes: 15

Release
- Original network: TV3
- Original release: 5 September – 5 December 2008

Season chronology
- ← Previous; 2007 Next → 2009

Robinsonekspedisjonen: 2008 is the eighth season of the Norwegian version of the Swedish show Expedition Robinson. It ran from 5 September to 5 December 2008.

== Season summary ==
The major twist in season eight was the "Heaven and Hell" living areas that the tribes lived in. The North team won the first immunity challenge and earned the right to live in "Heaven", which included huts and beds, while the losers, South team, were forced to live in a bat cave. The season is also remembered for the high amount of contestants to leave the show either voluntarily or in an evacuation. Throughout the season, there were several minor twists put into place such as the elimination duel between Manuel and Susanne in episode 2 and the double elimination the South team faced when they chose to through a challenge in order to eliminate a team member.

The biggest twist of all occurred when the teams merged. At the time of the merge there were only seven original contestants left in the tribe, however due to the amount of contestants who left early, three reserves entered. Preceding the merge was an elimination challenge which George Stephen Vaz lost, however it was later revealed that this was not a real elimination challenge and that he could earn a spot back in the game if he won it against the contestant of his choice. Vaz chose Hege Reime as his opponent and won the duel. Unlike in most years, instead of there being a final four there was a final three that faced off in a challenge to determine who would face the jury. Ultimately, it was Tom André Tveitan who won the season over Britt Carin Jonassen with a 6-1 jury vote.

== Finishing order ==
Contestant	Original Tribes	Episode 2 Tribes	Episode 6 Tribes	Merged Tribe	Finish
Anne Møller; 43, Hafrsfjord	South Team				Left Competition; Day 2
Connie Thorbjørnsen; 20, Birkeland	South Team				1st Voted Out; Day 2
Manuel Bezerra; 42, Oslo	South Team				Lost Duel; Day 4
Eirik Sjursen; 18, Drammen	South Team	South Team			2nd Voted Out; Day 4
Julie Hjemaas Gule; 22, Trondheim	South Team	South Team			Eliminated through Drawing; Day 4
Knut Jørgen Skaro; 33, Geilo	North Team	North Team			Evacuated; Day 5
Marielle Mathiassen; 20, Fredrikstad	South Team	South Team			3rd Voted Out; Day ?
Cathrine Aschim; 26, Hadeland	North Team	North Team			Left Competition; Day ?
Johnny Nordseth; 42, Trondheim	South Team	South Team			4th Voted Out; Day ?
Berit "Susanne" Rosenlund; 48, Hosle	North Team	South Team			Evacuated; Day ?
Øyvind Olsen; 27, Nesodden	North Team	North Team			5th Voted Out; Day ?
Nelden Jan Magnar Petersen; 26, Drammen	South Team	South Team			Left Competition; Day ?
Anthony Bratli; 41, Oslo	North Team	North Team	North Team		6th Voted Out; Day ?
George Stephen Vaz; Returned to Game	North Team	North Team	North Team		Lost Challenge; Day ?
Hege Reime; 26, Voss					Lost Duel; Day ?
Julianna Skartland; 26, Stokke	South Team	South Team	South Team	Robinson	7th Voted Out; 1st Jury Member; Day ?
Anton Soggiu; 27, Oslo				Robinson	8th Voted Out; 2nd Jury Member; Day ?
Nadia Marielle Mouacim; 29, Oslo	North Team	North Team	North Team	Robinson	9th Voted Out; 3rd Jury Member; Day ?
Ine Amundsen; 24, Bærum				Robinson	10th Voted Out; 4th Jury Member; Day ?
Andrea Huseby; 23, Sandefjord	North Team	North Team	South Team	Robinson	11th Voted Out; 5th Jury Member; Day ?
Christopher Soltvedt; 25, Bergen	North Team	North Team	North Team	Robinson	12th Voted Out; 6th Jury Member; Day ?
George Stephen Vaz; 54, Tomter	North Team	North Team	North Team	Robinson	Lost Challenge; 7th Jury Member; Day ?
Britt Carin Jonassen; 23, Grimstad	North Team	North Team	South Team	Robinson	Runner-Up; Day 47
Tom André Tveitan; 38, Sandefjord	South Team	South Team	South Team	Robinson	Sole Survivor; Day 47

== Voting history ==
	Original Tribes		Post Duel									Tribal Swap		Merged Tribe									
Episode #:	1		2			3		4		5		6		7		8	9	10	11	12	13		
Eliminated:	Anne; No vote	Connie; 7/8 votes	Manuel; No vote	Eirik; 6/7 votes	Julie; No vote	Knut; No vote	Marielle; 5/6 votes	Cathrine; No vote	Johnny; 4/6 votes	Susanne; No vote	Øyvind; 4/7 votes	Nelden; No vote	Anthony; 2/4 votes	Hege; No vote	Julianna; 5/10 votes	Anton; 10/13 votes	Nadia; 5/7 votes	Ine; 5/6 votes	Andrea; 3/4 votes	Christopher; 3/4 votes	George; No vote	Britt-Carin; 1/7 votes	Tom; 6/7 votes
Voter	Vote																						
Tom		Connie		Eirik	Safe		Marielle		Johnny						Ine	Anton; Anton	Nadia	Ine		Christopher	Won	Jury Vote	
Britt-Carin											Nadia				Ine	Anton; Anton	Nadia	Ine	Andrea	Christopher	Won	Jury Vote	
George											Øyvind		Christopher	Won	Julianna	Britt-Carin	Christopher	Ine	Andrea	Christopher	Lost		Tom
Christopher											Øyvind		Anthony		Ine	Anton; Anton	Nadia	Ine	Andrea	Tom			Tom
Andrea											Christopher					Anton; Anton	Nadia	Ine	George				Tom
Ine	Not in game														Julianna; Julianna	Christopher	Nadia	George				Britt-Carin	
Nadia											Øyvind		Anthony		Anton	Anton; Anton	Christopher						Tom
Anton	Not in game														Julianna; Julianna	Christopher							Tom
Julianna		Connie		Eirik	Safe		Marielle		Johnny						Ine								Tom
Hege	Not in game													Lost									
Anthony											Øyvind		Nadia										
Nelden	Eliminated			Eirik	Safe		Marielle		Johnny														
Øyvind											Nadia												
Susanne			Won	Eirik	Safe		Marielle		Johnny														
Johnny		Connie		Eirik	Safe		Marielle		Susanne														
Cathrine	Eliminated																						
Marielle		Connie		Eirik	Safe		Nelden		Nelden														
Knut																							
Julie		Connie		Eirik	Eliminated																		
Eirik		Connie		Susanne																			
Manuel		Connie	Lost																				
Connie		Julianna																					
Anne																							

== Rich/Poor Divide ==
As was the twist this season, beginning after the first reward challenge the winning tribe would be sent to live an island full of luxuries while the losing tribe was sent to live in a cave. In episode six Nelden chose to voluntarily leave the game in exchange for a prize trip. By doing this he automatically sent the remaining two members of South back to the cave.

Post Challenge	Rich	Poor
Reward 1	North	South
Reward 2	South	North
Nelden's Exit		South
