= Expedition Robinson 1999 =

- Season 3
- Presented by: Anders Lundin
- No. of days: 47
- No. of castaways: 17
- Winner: Jerker Dalman
- Runner-up: Klas Granström
- Location: Cadlao, Philippines
- No. of episodes: 13

Release
- Original network: SVT1
- Original release: 25 September – 18 December 1999

Additional information
- Filming dates: June 1999 – August 1999

Season chronology
- ← Previous; 1998 Next → 2000

Expedition Robinson 1999 is the third edition of Expedition Robinson to air in Sweden and it aired in 1999.

== Season summary ==
The major twist this season was that the contestants were initially divided up into four tribes based on their gender. Like in the previous season, when a tribe lost immunity the other tribe would be allowed to vote one of the members of the losing tribe out. Also the joker twist was brought back for this edition. The 'joker' this season was Douglas Svedberg. The dominant alliance this season was that of the West team's Jerker, Jesus, Klas, and Robert, who all managed to make it to the final four. Eventually Jerker Dalman won the season with a jury vote of 5–4 over Klas Granström, who was initially the third person voted off the show, but was allowed to return after winning a challenge against Deniz following Susanna's ejection from the game.

== Finishing order ==
Contestant	Original Tribes	Tribal Swap	Episode 4 Tribes	Merged Tribe	Finish
Franz Schnabel; 53, Unknown	East Team				Withdrew; Day 3
Deniz Özen; 29, Danderyd	East Team				1st Voted Out; Day 6
Klas Granström; Returned to the game	West Team	South Team			2nd Voted Out; Day 9
Susanna "Syrsa" Wahlberg; 18, Trollhättan	North Team	North Team			Ejected; Day 10
Jenny Hägglöf; 26, Eskilstuna	South Team	South Team	South Team		3rd Voted Out; Day 12
Johnny Leinonen; 33, Motala	East Team	North Team	North Team		4th Voted Out; Day 15
Marie-Louise "Malou" Rydin; 36, Trollhättan	North Team	North Team	North Team		5th Voted Out; Day 18
Mona Lundqvist; 47, Umeå	North Team	North Team	North Team	Robinson	6th Voted Out; 1st Jury Member; Day 22
Ulrika Klintell; 34, Örebro	South Team	South Team	South Team	Robinson	7th Voted Out; 2nd Jury Member; Day 26
Lisa Knapp; 26, Mälarhöjden	North Team	North Team	North Team	Robinson	8th Voted Out; 3rd Jury Member; Day 30
Douglas Svedberg; 24, Stockholm				Robinson	9th Voted Out; 4th Jury Member; Day 34
Martin Suorra; 48, Gällivare	East Team	North Team	North Team	Robinson	10th Voted Out; 5th Jury Member; Day 38
Sara Hallander; 34, Lund	South Team	South Team	South Team	Robinson	11th Voted Out; 6th Jury Member; Day 40
Agneta Ekström; 47, Gothenburg	South Team	South Team	South Team	Robinson	12th Voted Out; 7th Jury Member; Day 42
Jesus Pettersson; 27, Lund	West Team	South Team	South Team	Robinson	Lost Challenge; 8th Jury Member; Day 46
Robert Andersson; 25, Gällivare	West Team	South Team	South Team	Robinson	Lost Challenge; 9th Jury Member; Day 46
Klas Granström; 23, Luleå	West Team	South Team	North Team	Robinson	Runner-Up; Day 47
Jerker Dalman; 23, Paris, France	West Team	South Team	South Team	Robinson	Sole Survivor; Day 47

== Voting history ==
	Original Tribes		North vs South		Post Duel			Merged Tribe										
Episode #:	1	2	3	4		5	6	7	8	9	10	11	12		13			
Eliminated:	Franz; No vote	Deniz; 4/8 votes^{1}, ^{2}	Klas; 2/6 votes^{1}	Syrsa; No vote^{3}	Jenny; 3/6 votes^{1}	Johnny; 5/6 votes^{1}	Malou; 3/6 votes^{1}	Mona; 5/10 votes	Ulrika; 8/10 votes^{4}	Lisa; 7/10 votes^{4}	Douglas; 7/8 votes	Martin; 5/8 votes^{4}	Sara; 5/6 votes	Agneta; 4/5 votes	Jesus; Robert; No vote		Klas; 4/9 votes	Jerker; 5/9 votes
Voter	Vote																	
Jerker	Won	Deniz				Johnny	Malou	Mona	Ulrika	Lisa	Douglas	Martin	Sara	Agneta	Won		Jury Vote	
Klas	Won	Deniz		Won	Jerker			Mona	Ulrika	Lisa	Douglas	Martin	Sara	Agneta	2nd	Won	Jury Vote	
Robert	Won	Deniz				Johnny	Malou	Mona	Ulrika	Lisa	Douglas	Martin	Sara	Agneta	3rd	Lost	Klas	
Jesus	Won	Deniz				Johnny	Malou	Mona	Ulrika	Lisa	Douglas	Martin	Sara	Agneta	4th	Lost		Jerker
Agneta	Won					Johnny	Lisa	Mona	Ulrika	Lisa	Douglas	Martin	Sara	Jesus				Jerker
Sara	Won					Johnny	Lisa	Ulrika	Ulrika	Lisa	Douglas	Robert	Robert					Jerker
Martin			Klas		Sara			Robert	Ulrika	Douglas	Douglas	Sara					Klas	
Douglas	Not in game									Lisa	Sara	Klas						Jerker
Lisa		Jenny	Robert		Jenny			Robert	Ulrika	Douglas							Klas	
Ulrika	Won					Malou	Mona	Robert	Robert	Sara							Klas	
Mona		Jenny	Jesus		Jenny			Robert	Klas									Jerker
Malou		Jenny	Agneta		Jenny													
Johnny			Klas		Sara													
Jenny	Won																	
Syrsa		Jenny	Jerker															
Deniz				Lost														
Franz																		

^1 As part of the twist this season, the tribe that won immunity voted someone out of the losing tribe.
^2 At the first tribal council both Deniz and Jenny received four votes. Because of this, both were forced to draw lots to determine who would be eliminated.
^3 Due to Susanna's ejection in episode 4, both Deniz and Klaus were offered an opportunity to re-enter the game through a duel.
^4 At the seventh, eighth, and tenth tribal councils black votes were cast.
