= Expedition Robinson (disambiguation) =

Expedition Robinson or Expedición Robinson may refer to:

- Expedition Robinson, a Swedish television show
- Expedition Robinson (Swiss TV series), a Swiss television show
- Expedition Robinson (Central Europe), a German and Austrian television show
- Expedición Robinson (Argentine TV series), an Argentine television show
- Expedición Róbinson (Colombian TV series), a Colombian television show
- Expedición Robinson (Ecuadorian TV series), an Ecuadorian television show
- Expedición Robinson: La Isla Vip, a Chilean television show
