= Desafío (TV series) =

Colombian television series

- Genre: Reality competition
- Presented by: Margarita Rosa (2004–2006, 2008, 2011–2016); Victor Mallarino (2004–2005, 2009–2010); Lina Marulanda & Juan Pablo Llano (2007); Taliana Vargas (2009); Toya Montoya (2010); Juan Ignacio Velásquez (2011); Catalina Aristizábal (2017–2018); Andrea Serna (2019–present)
- Country of origin: Colombia
- No. of seasons: 21

Production
- Running time: 42 minutes

Original release
- Network: Caracol TV
- Release: 2004 – present

Related
- Expedición Robinson; Other versions

Desafío (The Challenge) is a Colombian reality competition television series produced by Caracol TV. In the show, contestants are isolated in an island or -more recently- in a secluded area and compete for cash and other prizes. The show uses a system of progressive elimination, allowing the contestants to vote off other members until only one final contestant remains and wins a cash prize.

Although the show has been mostly produced by Caracol TV, other versions have been produced by GenTV and Univision. These two versions were produced in Florida and aimed to the Latin American audience in the United States.

== Structure and Format ==
=== Groups ===
Contestants are split in different groups of usually six to eight people each. The criteria for the division might vary from season to season. Some criteria used have been whether they had been in a previous season ("Sobrevivientes", and "Superhumanos"), if they were famous ("Celebridades"), age ("Cuchacos", "Pelados", and "Catanos"), social status ("Privilegiados", "Rebuscadores", and, "Llevados"), or where they came from ("Antioqueños", "Cachacos", "Cafeteros", "Costeños", "Emigrantes", "Santandereanos", and "Vallecaucanos")

Each group is given a unique name and an identifying color. These are used on flags, challenge courses, on-screen text and various other items. Each player is given an assortment of clothes with their respective colors and symbols. Players are required to wear the color of their group in a visible location at all times, allowing the audience to identify their affiliation. Upon switching groups (due to a merge or dissolution), players are required to give up their old clothes and obtain new ones in the new group's color.

=== Locations and beaches ===
Each group is assigned a different beach to stay. Each beach has different qualities and benefits:

- Playa Alta/Oro (High/Golden Beach) has a luxurious cabin with beds, showers, bathrooms and a fully equipped kitchen. In some occasions, there are employees that prepare the meals for each contestant.
- Playa Media/Plata (Mid/Silver Beach) features the bare necessities for living. Contestants have a wooden roof with hammocks to sleep. They are given pots and pans, knives, some food and tools to hunt and cook.
- Playa Baja/Bronce (Low/Bronze Beach) features the worst conditions for the contestants to live in. Contestants have to build their own shelter or sleep in a cave. There is no food and the contestants have to eat fruits or try to hunt or fish what they can.

During each show, the groups have to compete in a challenge ("Desafío territorial") to decide which group will stay on each beach. As the show progresses and contestants are eliminated, the teams are merged into a single group and they are taken to Playa Fusión, which features amenities slightly better than Playa Media.

=== Challenges ===
During each show, teams will play three separate challenges:

- Desafío Territorial (Territorial Challenge) where the winning group receives the "keys" to "Playa Alta". The second and third place teams get the "keys" to "Playa Media" and "Playa Baja" respectively.
- Desafío de Salvación (Salvation Challenge) where the winning team gains immunity from elimination, plus, in some seasons, the chance to be judges at the final "juicio" or judgment.
- Desafío a Muerte (Death Challenge) where the losing team is sent to "Juicio" to have one of their members eliminated.

Challenges vary from obstacle courses, to races, swimming matches, building puzzles, among many others.

=== El Juicio ===
El "Juicio" ("The Judgment") is held after the ‘Desafío de Salvación’. Here, the group that lost the "Desafío Final" vote one person out of their team. Present at the judgment is the team that won the "Desafío de Salvación", who will serve as the judges. After a brief discussion of the events that led to that moment, each member of the losing team walks up to a table and secretly votes to eliminate a member of his team. After all members of the team have voted, the host counts the votes.

Originally, the judges voted to save a member of the other team. The strategy usually was to try to anticipate who the losing team would want to eliminate and save him/her. The next member with the most votes would then be eliminated. In 2008, the rules were changed and the judges were given the option to veto the choice of the other team to eliminate a member. If they veto, the losing team is forced to vote publicly for a second member to be eliminated. This is referred to as the "bloody vote". In 2009, a new rule was made. The losing team voted to eliminate a member of their team. Then, a second voting has to be done to choose a second member to be eliminated. Then, the judges decide which of the two "sentenced" members was eliminated.

In the event of ties, sometimes the judges get to choose which of the members of the losing team that are involved in the tie, is eliminated. Also, the members that are chosen to be eliminated are sometimes given a chance to vouch in front of the judges for their safety.

=== End of the game and prizes ===
When there are two contestants left in the game, they return to Colombia for one last show, along with the eliminated contestants. Here, the audience votes for the contestant they want to win the game. In 2008, the system was changed and it was the other contestants who voted for the winner. The winning contestant usually gets a prize in cash whereas the second place contestant gets a new car.

=== The Box format ===
The COVID-19 pandemic and its effects forced changes in the show's format starting from 2020, with the edition scheduled for that year having its production postponed until further notice. Given the worldwide travel restrictions triggered by the pandemic, in early 2021 the reality's production staff decided to stage the show within Colombia, building a special complex for that purpose which would work as a bubble to ensure the adequate biosecurity conditions for contestants and staff.

In The Box, three teams (Alpha, Beta, and Gamma) of eight (four men and four women) led by a captain are made from eleven original groups of four contestants (two men and two women) after a first challenge, while an additional team (Omega) is later made up of contestants who were not originally selected by the respective team captains, who participate in a special challenge to get the chance to join this last team. Unlike other previous editions of the show in which teams would have to win the right to stay at the best territory in each cycle, in this format the four teams are assigned a house to stay until the team dissolves or merges, all of which have the same qualities and benefits such as public services, a fully equipped kitchen with supplies, beds, showers, bathrooms, furniture, grill, a swimming pool and a gym, which they will progressively lose if teams fail to win the different challenges, to the point those houses will be akin to the Playa Baja/Bronce of previous editions.

During each cycle, five separate challenges are played at five different arenas or boxes: Blue (for water-themed challenges), Red (for contact-themed challenges), Yellow (for ground-based, military-style challenges), White/Rainbow (for air-themed challenges in which contestants may not touch the floor) and Black (for elimination challenges). The challenges teams have to play in every cycle are:

- Desafío de Sentencia y Hambre (Sentence and Hunger Challenge), where the winning team gets to select one or two contestants from any team (even their own) to participate in the cycle's "Desafío a Muerte" and also keep all the food they have been supplied with at the beginning of the cycle. The second team gets to choose a food item from an offered selection and the remaining teams are left without any food for the remainder of the cycle.
- Desafío de Sentencia y Servicios (Sentence and Services Challenge), where the winning team gets to select one or two contestants to participate in the cycle's "Desafío a Muerte" and also keep all of their house's public services (water, electricity, gas) running as normal. The second team gets to choose one of those services while the rest are cut, and the remaining teams get all of their public services cut for the remainder of the cycle.
- Desafío de Sentencia y Bienestar (Sentence and Wellness Challenge), where the winning team also gets to select contestants for the "Desafío a Muerte" as well as keep all of their house's amenities (beds, furniture, pool, gym) in place. The team placing second gets to choose one of those amenities, and the third and fourth-placed teams are deprived of all amenities.
- Desafío de Sentencia, Premio y Castigo (Sentence, Prize and Punishment Challenge), where the winning team gets to select the last contestants for the "Desafío a Muerte" and is also entitled to get a prize and select another team to get a punishment.
- Desafío a Muerte (Death Challenge), where the contestants who were sentenced after the cycle's other four challenges play to avoid being eliminated. The ones to come in last place are eliminated.

The Black "box" is only used for the Desafío a Muerte, while the other challenges alternate around the remaining four boxes every cycle. Challenges vary from obstacle courses, to races, swimming matches, building puzzles, among many others.

As in previous editions, the teams dissolve and reconfigure as the cycles progress until the last eight contestants (four men and four women) are merged and play a semi-final challenge, separated by gender. At the end of the show, a male contestant and a female one are declared as winners.

== Participants ==
List of participants by year

Desafío 2004 - La Aventura

Celebridades	Sobrevivientes	Retadores
Paula Andrea Betancourt	Rafael Barrera	Paula Domínguez
Isabella Santodomingo	Mónica Londoño	Francisco Escobar
Carlos "El Pibe" Valderrama	Luisa Fernanda Bejarano	Mario Espitia
Juan Carlos Vargas	Iván Darío Correa	Leidy Farith Polo
Patricia Castañeda	Marlon Restrepo	Elsa Velásquez
Juan David Posada	Juliana Posso	Santiago Zuleta

Desafío 2005 - Cabo Tiburón, Colombia

Celebridades	Sobrevivientes	Retadores
Faustino Asprilla	Paula Domínguez	Vanessa Cañizales
Luigi Aycardi	Jean Pierre Mandonnet	Mario Alberto Caparroso
Héctor Buitrago	Cristóbal Echavarría	Álvaro Mesa
Catalina Acosta	Pedro Luis Falla	Mauricio Ochoa
Tatiana de los Ríos	Catalina Jaimes	María Victoria Ramírez
Carolina Sabino	Carolina Lizcano	Catalina Tarud

Desafío 2006 - La guerra de los estratos

Privilegiados	Rebuscadores	Llevados
Carolina Ángel	Angélica Aristizábal	Diana Maya
Gloria García	Eileen Moreno	Tatiana Rueda
Catherin Salazar	Mayerly Vásquez	Levia Peralta
Alfredo Varela	Gabriel Fernando Marín	Juan Carlos Camero
Juan Guillermo Zea	Diego Agudelo	Jorge Eliécer Pinto
Juan Miguel Camacho	Jorge Alberto Peláez	Manuel Horacio Velasco

Desafío 2007 - La Guerra de las Generaciones

Catanos	Cuchachos	Pelados
Alexandra Díaz	Carlos Díazgranados	Camilo Vega
Betty Rosales	Edgar Jaimes	Cindy González
Johanna Cote	Fernely Guerrero	Fabio Lesmes
John Dossman	Jair Romero	Harold Martínez
Jorge Paz	Janeth Valencia	Isabel Solís
Luis Arias	Laura Puerta	John Jairo Córdoba
Sandra Azuero	Margot Álvarez	Nina Osswald
Víctor Benavides	Sandra Bermúdez	Sharon Durán

Desafío 2008 - La Lucha de las Regiones

Costeños	Cachacos	Vallecaucanos
Gustavo Fuentes	Sonia Vanegas	Clara María Cruz
Brígida Gutiérrez	Mauricio González	Diego Landaeta
Juan José Sierra	María Julieth Ávila	Gustavo González
Stephanie Carrillo	Jorge Iván Giraldo	Halem Castillo
Myriam Brant	Carolina Trujillo	Katherine Arango
Klein Contreras	Andrés Alarcón	María Isabel Franco
Juan Pablo Londoño	Pedro José Orduz	Lina María Ramírez

Desafío 2009 - La Lucha de las Regiones, La Revancha

Costeños	Cachacos	Emigrantes
John Jairo Larios	Arlex Eduardo Ávila	José Jesús Henao
Carlos Adolfo Ponnefz	Andrés Gaitán Herrera	Ludwig Harold Monoga
Jonathan Mulford	Hebert Fabián Guzmán	Didier de Jesús Castañeda
Marie Cristine Echávez	Aydeé Patricia Galvis	Jhovanna Ramírez
Anaís Gutiérrez	Sofía Blanchet	María Claudia Rubio
Stephanie Coymat	Shirley Lorena Bermúdez	Sandra Mendivelso
MaryLuz López	Miguel Ángel Urrea	Paola Andrea Rodríguez

Desafío 2010 - La Lucha de las Regiones, el Brazalete Dorado

Costeños	Sobrevivientes	Paisas
Jonathan Cure Simonds	Dayana Martínez	Akemi Nakamura Gómez
Angélica María Duque	Eider Guerrero	Carolina Jaramillo
Bony Lim Rodríguez	Eliana Ardila	Cristian Leonardo Flores
Emerson Eloy Vásquez	Karen Jiménez	Daniel Alejandro Cortés
Martha Maturana	Oscar Mahecha	Luis Alfredo Rueda
Silvio José Carrasquilla	William Vargas	Natalia Rueda Montoya
John Jairo Escobar	Temistocles Savelli	Gina Daza

Desafío 2011 - La Lucha de las Regiones, La Piedra Sagrada

Retadores	Paisas	Sobrevivientes
Roland Bryan Edén	Óscar Muñoz	Andres Felipe Nieto
Diego Díaz	Daniel Tirado López	Yorlady Moreno León
Ceidy Lorena Gaitan	Luis Fernando Cardona	Jenny Liseth Machado
Hanny Marcela Mendoza	Tatiana Cristina Arango	Hector Manuel Osorio
Martha Bonilla	Nalu Sol del Mar Guerrero	Kelly Andrea Cadena
Carlos Mauricio Morales	Deicy Yamile Cárdenas	Jader Alexis Arizala
Farid Laverde	Klein de Jesús Contreras	Arlex Eduardo Avila

Desafío 2012 - El Fin Del Mundo

Cafeteros	Cachacos	Costeños	Sobrevivientes
Aníbal Alberto Morales	Mauricio Iragorry	Rosa Paola Caiafa	Sergio Alejandro Arango
Carlos Ancízar Quintero	Roland Villegas	Sandra Victoria Mendoza	Jénnifer Alexa Caicedo
Luz Alba Sánchez	Julián David Agudelo	Pierine Yolieh Peñaranda	Ruby Alejandra Murillo
John Alexander Jiménez	Jenny Leidy Moreno	Robinson de Jesús Pérez	Carlos Eduardo Mejía
Vanessa Posada	Adriana Vargas	Dawis Martínez	Édinson Fernando Muñoz
Katherine Gómez	Sandra Milena Rojas	Martín Suárez	Silvia Vanessa Becerra

Desafío 2013 - África, El Origen

Celebridades	Sobrevivientes	Retadores
María Luisa Calle	Martín Suárez	Elizabeth Loaiza
Claudia Moreno	Daniel Cortés	Alejandro Herrera
Mónica Rodríguez	Stephanie Carrillo	Cindy Jiménez
Fabián Mendoza	Silvia Vanessa Becerra	Jaime Andrés Espinal
Hassam Gómez	Fabián Guzmán	Jonathan Aarón Hurtado
Gregorio Pernía	Carolina Jaramillo	Julián Alberto Árias
Juan David Agudelo	Halem Castillo	Lina María Quintero

Desafío 2014 - Marruecos, Las Mil y Una Noches

Celebridades	Sobrevivientes	Retadores
David García	Rosa Caiafa	Betsy Tobar
Adrian Lara	Elizabeth Loaiza	Carlos Hernández
Daniella Donado	Sandra Milena Rojas	David Henao
Mauricio Mejía	Ronald Villegas	Manuela Vásquez
Daniela Tapia	Oscar Muñoz	George Monti
Sebastián Caicedo	Carlos Díasgranados	Diana Peña
Martha Isabel Bolaños	Jorge Iván Giraldo	Wilder Zapata

Desafío 2015 - India, La Reencarnación

Tigres	Elefantes	Cocodrilos
Akemi Nakamura	Juan David Posada	Faustino Asprilla
George Monti	Marie Cristine Echávez	Pierine Peñaranda
Alejandro Herrera	Maryluz López Mantilla	Jonathan Aaron Hurtado
Tatiana Rueda	Hanny Mendoza	Jonathan Cure Simonds
Vanessa Posada	Hassam Gómez	Carolina Trujillo
Tatiana De los Ríos	Marlon Restrepo	Dawis Martínez
Julián Arias	Paula Andrea Betancourt	Tatiana Arango
Daniel Tirado	Rolando Patarroyo	Cindy Martínez

Desafío 2016 - Súper Humanos, Súper Regiones

Antioqueños	Vallecaucanos	Cafeteros	Cachacos	Santandereanos	Costeños
María Clara Ceballos	Angélik Hernández	Tomás Mejía Marulanda	Karoline Rodríguez	Juan Carlos Arango	Ángel Jesús Arregoces
Augusto Castro	Gustavo Molina	Esmeralda Amézquita	Eduar Salas	Leonardo Quintero	Karmen Mestre
Paola Usme	Leandro Cambindo	Guillola González	Jeysson Monroy	María Fernanda Bylander	Karen Bray
Sebastián Buitrago	Marcela Peña Salas	Alejandro Ortíz	Julián Duarte	Valentina Villamizar	Kevin Vega
Daniel Vanegas	José Miguel Cambindo	Carlos Andica	Milena Salcedo	Virgilio Elehazar Galeano	Juan Carlos Fuente
Johanna Vargas	Leidy Orozco	Paula Andrea Restrepo	Angie Hernández	Johanna Orozco	Mar Ballestas
Álvaro Vallejo	Edinson Angulo	Helver Emir Hernández	Miguel Ángel Sierra	Jonathan Lozano	Christian Rafael Maestre

Desafío 2017 - Súper Humanos, Cap Cana

Antioqueños	Vallecaucanos	Cafeteros	Cachacos	Santandereanos	Costeños	Desterrados
Esteban Bernal	Alejandra Cañizares	Luis Giraldo	Victoria Sierra	Fabio Carreño	Dina Vergara	Tatiana Ussa
Mateo Carvajal	Óscar López	Camila López	Leidy Martínez	Andrea Fernández	Luz Elena Echeverría	Dúmar Roa
Valentina Ortiz	Jhon Jairo Mosquera	Yeni Arias	Camila Celemín	José Vargas	Ricardo Álvarez	Francisco Zuluaga
Juliana Jaramillo	Juan Olarte	Héctor Murillo	Daniel Méndez	Tatiana Cabeza	Alejandro Abomohor	Edith Rocío Ortega
Fausto Murillo Luisa Hernández	Natali Gómez	Daniela Cardona	Jhonnatan Bulla	Frank Sáenz	Tatiana Ángel	Javier Argel

Desafío 2018 - Súper Humanos XV

Antioqueños	Vallecaucanos	Cafeteros	Cachacos	Santandereanos	Costeños	Súper Humanos
Diego Posada	Ricardo Montaño	Mauricio Giraldo	Marisol Chaparro	Paola García	Óscar Muñoz	Camila López
David Trujillo	Belmer Ospina	Santiago Guarín	Witsmar Lucumí	Paola Santos	María Fernanda Aguilar	Mateo Carvajal
Laura Restrepo	Yeison López	Víctor Bobadilla	Laura Sin	Yaniz Valencia	Mike Wilches	Ángel Arregoces
Jonathan Betancur	Daniela Lozano	Manuela Arango	Marcela Rozo	Alexis Cuero	Sunny Doria	Karoline Rodríguez
Valeria Duque	Mónica Henao	Laura Suárez	Shadi Harb	Rodney Camargo	María Cristina Vergara	Óscar López
Shirley Atehortúa	Karen Cano	Violeta Struvay	David Bedoya	Fabián Gómez	Kevin Fuentes	Andrea Fernández

Desafío 2019 - Súper Regiones

Amazónicos	Antioqueños	Cachacos	Cafeteros	Costeños
Lizeth Mendieta Villanueva	Verónica Zuluaga	Lina Franco	Ángela Lopera	Brynnis Joissy López Olivella
Diana Gil Bora	Maria Camila Cartagena	Diana Másmela	Tatiana Rincón	Lairen Bernier
Clever Alejandro Vargas	Daniel Velásquez Zuluaga	David Franco	Kevin Cárdenas	Jerry Karth
Fee Wee Súarez	Juan Fernando Moncada Madrid	Alejandro Gómez Mapaná	Didier Mauricio Sepúlveda	Reikin Herrera
Llaneros	Pastusos	Santandereanos	Tolimenses	Vallecaucanos
Mayra Alexandra Muñoz	Karla Maya	Katherine Gonzalez	Natalia Vargas	Juliana Ocampo
Diana Carolina Camacho Tafur	Andrea Tatiana Morales	Daniela Arias	Viviana Rodríguez	Yenny Álvarez
Santiago Rodríguez	Juan David Dueñas Suárez	Yei Gamboa	Robert López	Wilber Rentería
Andrés Felipe Lazcano	Cristian López	Brian Aceros	Hernán Darío Guzmán Ipuz	Diego Fernando Lenis Calderón

Desafío 2021 - The Box

Amazónicos	Antioqueños	Boyacenses	Cachacos	Cafeteros	Costeños
Ángela López Guarín ("Tatica")	Laura Jiménez Madrid	Rodolfo Torres	Diana Carolina Rey	Carolina Giraldo	Steffit Valencia ("Tiffi")
Yadira Castaño ("Yatu")	Juan David Zapata	Laura Angarita	John Ronin Bedoya	Carolina Cortés ("Carito")	César José Romero ("CJ")
Cristian Alexander Acho	María Camila Ospina	George Gutiérrez	Sofía Acosta	Carlos Echeverri	Miguel David Assias
Fabio Eduardo Torres	Juan Manuel Gil	Nina Yurany Melo	Jonnathan Calderón ("Tatán")	Luis Miguel Tibocha	María Clara Cortés
Llaneros	Pastusos	Santandereanos	Tolimenses	Vallecaucanos	
Sonia Manjarrés	Mayeli Valencia	Francisco Remolina	Paola Solano	Melissa Chalare ("Meli")	
Jorge Luis Cáceres Franco	Ángela González	Karen Lorena Bayona	Karol Tatiana Zambrano	Gabriela Sánchez	
Andrea Manjarrés	Jesús David Morales	Vanessa Torres	Esteban Perdomo	Óscar David Coime ("Razza")	
Gonzalo Andrés Pinzón ("Galo")	Juan José Lemos	Andrés Felipe Ojeda ("Pipe")	Carlos Mario Pérez ("Mono")	Deiby Gómez ("Dagómez")	

Desafío 2022 - The Box 2

Amazónicos	Antioqueños	Boyacenses	Cachacos	Cafeteros	Costeños
Emily Múnera	Anna De Villa	María Fernanda Tobitto	Karla Rodríguez	Andrea Cardona	Valeria Porto
Luis Mosquera ("Leticiano")	Carlos Oquendo	Carlos Andrés Merchán	Brayan Huertas	Neider Criollo	Samir Reveiz
Xiomara Alfonso	Valentina González	Daniela Camargo ("Dani")	María Alejandra Sánchez ("Maleja")	Dayana Bermúdez	Stephanie Villadiego
Otoniel Tonguino	Andrés Ossa	Juan Pablo Casallas	Miguel Ángel Rodríguez	Andrés Ramírez ("Skirla")	Andrés Alfonso Miranda ("Tarzán")
Llaneros	Pastusos	Santandereanos	Tolimenses	Vallecaucanos	
María Paula Cifuentes	Karol Andrea Yela	Grecia Gutiérrez	Carmelina Durán ("Lina")	Alexandra Rodríguez ("Alexa")	
Moisés Sanmiguel	Julián Bastidas	Duván Yesid Niño	Jorge Luis Castillo Carballo	Víctor Hugo Gaviria ("Padre Torvic")	
Karina Rojas	Lisseth Torres ("Liz")	Diana Villamizar	Andrea Olaya ("Valkyria")	Natalia Medina	
Camilo Tarifa ("Ceta")	Fernando Illera	Johan Sebastián Patiño	Humberto Plazas ("Beto")	Sebastián Paredes	

Desafío 2023 - The Box 3

Participants
Alejandra Martínez	Alejandra Ulloa	Alejandro Calderón	Alejandro Escudero
Alfredo Martínez	Byron Riveros	Camilo Bogdan	Carolina Abadía
Daniel Murillo	Daniela Taborda	David Mateus	Douglas Mackarthur Bueno
Federico Orjuela	Franqui Reyes	Iván Gutiérrez	Johana Gómez
Juan Pablo Ángel	Juliana Tovar	Kate López	Kelly Ríos
Maira Padilla	Margoth Salazar	Maryam Gómez	Óscar Rivas
Paz Ruiz	Rafael Rapelo	Ricky Rodríguez	Sara Cifuentes
Sara Velásquez	Saskya Badrán	Valeria Restrepo	Yan Pizo

Desafío 2024 - XX

Alpha	Beta	Gamma	Omega
Marlon David Duque Lemus	Angel Danilo Rojas Montoya	Luis Alexander Gómez Getial	Enzo Alejandro Meneses Bermejo
Francisco José Amaya	Juan David Villada Bañol	Henrry Alejandro Baquero Ruiz	Bryant Enrique Guzmán Daza
Alejandro Londoño Aguirre	Kevyn Leonardo Mosquera Rúa	Yurleisi Carolina Dickson Prado	Franck Stiward Luna Valencia
Iván Andrés Arteaga Martínez	Jhoana Daniela Acero Pérez	Karoline Artunduaga Galvis	Jorge Andrés Yepes Restrepo
Juliana Melissa Gaspar Marín	Luisa Alejandra Sanmiguel Quiroz	Camila Gamboa Monsalve	Valerie de la Cruz Millán
Karen María Candia Ramírez	Darlyn Estefanía Giraldo Torres	Gloria Katherin Peña Manrique	Ana María Tavera Lozano
Ana María Restrepo Gómez	Juan Esteban Caipe Caipe	Vittorio Orodico Doglioni	Paula Natalia Roncancio Rincón
María Paula Tobón de Castro	Valentina Rodríguez Ortiz	Yoifer Andrés Lemus Moreno	Lina Marcela Hernández

Desafío 2025 - del siglo XXI

Alpha	Beta	Gamma	Omega
Eleazar Betancur	Gerónimo Angel	Anthony Zambrano	Alan Baleta
Juan Andrés Díaz Hurtado	Harvey Abrahan Andrés Flórez Vaderrama	Cristián Orozco	Camilo Andrés García
Leonel Heredia Moreno	Kevin Daniel Sánchez García	Guillaume George Dubs	Gerson Andrey Díaz Morales
Luis Daniel Vergel Peña	Mario Alejandro Pineda Diez	José Manuel Maldonado Zapata	Julio Alberto Sánchez Cortés
Camila Arrastía Calderón	Claudia Milena Díaz Llanos	Enailis Rosa Mejía Ruiz	Deisy Esmeralda Fajardo Rojas
Grecia Alexandra Viloria Ramírez	Daniela Zuluaga Montilla	Isabel Cristina Carvajal Castaño	Katiuska Bula
Manuela Gómez	Valentina Benincore	Mercedes Isabel Pérez	María Camila Chacón Herrera
Sathya Vanessa Díaz Velandia	Valentina Zuluaga Montilla	Yudisa Andrea Martínez Lemos	Miryan Daniela Hernández García

== Seasons ==
The Colombian version is produced by Caracol TV and has been hosted by several celebrities. Each competition has a unique name, and lasts from 13 to 15 episodes.

#	Name	Location	Original teams	Winner(s)	Runner(s)-up	Audience
1	Desafío 2004: La Aventura	Colombian's and Panama Islands	Three teams of six	Paula Andrea Betancourt	Mónica Londoño	14.7
2	Desafío 2005: Cabo Tiburón, Chocó, Colombia	Colombia (Cabo Tiburón)	Three teams of six	Tatiana de los Ríos	Álvaro Mesa	14.9
3	Desafío 2006: Guerra de Estratos	Dominican Republic	Three teams of six	Alfredo Varela	Diego Agudelo	10.9
4	Desafío 2007: La Guerra de las Generaciones	Panama (Bocas del Toro Archipelago)	Three teams of eight	Isabel Solís Montoya	Camilo Vega	8.6
5	Desafío 2008: La Lucha de las Regiones	Panama (Isla Contadora)	Five teams of six	Juan Pablo Londoño	Pedro José Orduz	12.9
6	Desafío 2009: La Lucha de las Regiones, La Revancha	Panama (Bocas del Toro Archipelago)	Six teams of six	Didier Castañeda	Ludwig Monoga	13.5
7	Desafío 2010: La Lucha de las Regiones, El Brazalete Dorado	Panama (Bocas del Toro Archipelago)	Six teams of six	Eider Guerrero	Jhonattan Cure	13.6
8	Desafío 2011: La Lucha de las Regiones, La Piedra Sagrada	Dominican Republic	Six teams of six	Mauricio Morales	Jader Arizala	12.4
9	Desafío 2012: El fin del mundo	El Salvador	Six teams of six	Jenny Moreno	Sergio Alejandro Arango	14.0
10	Desafío 2013: África, el origen	Senegal	Three teams of seven	Carolina Jaramillo	Alejandro Herrera	13.1
11	Desafío 2014: Marruecos, las mil y una noches	Morocco	Three teams of seven	Wilder Zapata	Manuela Vásquez	11.1
12	Desafío 2015: India, la reencarnación	India	Three teams of eight	Vanessa Posada	Pierine Peñaranda	12.3
13	Desafío 2016: Superhumanos	Trinidad and Tobago	Six teams of seven	Ángel Jesús Arregoces	Augusto Castro	11.6
14	Desafío 2017: Superhumanos Cap Cana	Dominican Republic	Six teams of six	Mateo Carvajal	Jhon Jairo Mosquera	12.5
15	Desafío 2018: Superhumanos, XV	Dominican Republic	Six teams of six	Óscar Muñoz	Witsmar Lucumí (Note: Based on votes from the public broadcast. After details about controversy in its exact date of the live finale.)	12.1
16	Desafío 2019: Súper Regiones	Dominican Republic	Ten teams of four	Brynnis Joissy López Olivella; Lairen Bernier; Jerry Karth; Reikin Herrera	Lizeth Mendieta Villanueva; Diana Gil Bora; Clever Alejandro Vargas; Fee Wee Súarez	11.0
17	Desafío 2021: The Box	Colombia (Nimaima)	Eleven teams of four	Gonzalo Andrés Pinzón; Paola Solano	Juan Manuel Gil; Laura Jiménez Madrid	11.8 11.8
18	Desafío 2022: The Box 2	Colombia (Nimaima)	Eleven teams of four	Camilo Tarifa; Andrea Olaya	Juan Pablo Casallas; Alexandra Rodríguez	11.8 11.8
19	Desafío 2023: The Box 3	Colombia (Nimaima)	Four teams of eight	Alejandro Calderón; Alejandra Martinez	Yan Pizo; Kelly Rios	10.0
20	Desafío 2024: XX	Colombia (Nimaima)	Four teams of eight	Kevyn Mosquera	Darlyn Giraldo	11.6
21	Desafío 2025: del siglo XXI	Colombia (Nimaima)	Four teams of eight	Anthony Zambrano	José Manuel Maldonado	11.3

== International versions ==
Although the main version of Desafío is produced by Caracol TV for Colombian television, three other versions have been produced already.

Currently airing No longer airing Upcoming or returning version

Country	Show name	TV channel	Winners	Presenter(s)	Grand prize
Bulgaria	Игри на волята [bg] (Igri na volyata)	NOVA	Season 1, 2019: Dobrin Nikolov; Season 2, 2020: Milen Tsvetkov; Season 3, 2021: Andrey Gridin; Season 4, 2022: Aleksa Erski; Season 5, 2023: Ivan Rulev; Season 6, 2024: Martin Kunev; Season 7, 2025: Miroslav Velikov; Season 8, 2026: Current season	Aleksandra Sarchadjieva (1); Dimo Aleksiev (2–6); Ralitsa Paskaleva (2–7); Pavel Nikolov (7–present); Ivet Lalova-Collio (8–present)	200,000 лв. (1); 100,000 лв. (2–7)
Colombia (original format)	Desafío	Caracol Televisión	Season 1, 2004: Paula Andrea Betancourt; Season 2, 2005: Tatiana de los Ríos; Season 3, 2006: Alfredo Valera; Season 4, 2007: Isabel Solís; Season 5, 2008: Juan Pablo Londoño; Season 6, 2009: Didier Castañeda; Season 7, 2010: Eider Guerrero; Season 8, 2011: Mauricio Morales; Season 9, 2012: Jenny "Perla" Moreno; Season 10, 2013: Carolina Jaramillo; Season 11, 2014: Wilder Zapata; Season 12, 2015: Vanessa Posada; Season 13, 2016: Ángel Jesús Arregoces; Season 14, 2017: Mateo Carvajal; Season 15, 2018: Óscar "Olímpico" Muñoz; Season 16, 2019: Equipo Costeños; Season 17, 2021: Gonzalo "Galo" Pinzón and Paola Solano; Season 18, 2022: Camilo Tarifa "Ceta" and Andrea Olaya "Valkyria"; Season 19, 2023: Alejandro Calderón "Sensei" and Alejandra Martínez "Aleja"; Season 20, 2024: Kevyn Mosquera; Season 21, 2025: Anthony Zambrano; Season 22, 2027: Upcoming season	Margarita Rosa de Francisco (1–3, 5, 8–13); Víctor Mallarino (1–2, 6–7); Lina Marulanda† (4); Juan Pablo Llano (4); Taliana Vargas (6); Toya Montoya (7–8); Juan Ignacio Velásquez (8); Catalina Aristizábal (14–15); Andrea Serna (16–present) Host or second presenter: Melina Ramírez (14); Camila Avella (15); Daniella Álvarez (16-17); Gabriela Tafur (18-19); María Fernanda Aristizábal (20-21); Sofía Osío Luna (22-present)	COP 300,000,000 (1–8); COP 600,000,000 (9–15); COP 900,000,000 (16); COP 800,000,000 (Note: Split by half between the male and female winners.) (17–19); COP 1,200,000,000 (20)
Greece	Nomads	ANT1	Season 1, 2017: Apostolia Zoi; Season 2, 2018: Stelios Hantampakis	Grigoris Amaoutoglou (1); Savvas Poumbouras (2); Giorgos Lentzas (2)	€150,000
Mexico	La Isla, el reality	Azteca 7	Season 1, 2012: María Renee Núñez; Season 2, 2013: Cecilia Ponce; Season 3, 2014: Francisco Covarrubias; Season 4, 2015: Jorge Alberti; Season 5, 2016: Jorge Luis Vázquez; Season 6, 2017: Luis Arellanes	Alejandro Lukini	MXN$2,000,000
Mexico	La Isla: Desafío en Turquía	Azteca Uno	Season 1, 2023: Maite Olalde; Season 2, 2024: Fernando Lozada	Alejandro Lukini	MXN$2,000,000
Romania	Rătăciți în Panama (Lost in Panama)	Kanal D	Season 1, 2009: Aly Elsiddig	Andrei Gheorghe	€50,000
Romania	Ultimul trib (The last tribe)	Antena 1	Season 1, 2018–2019: Mircea Zamfir	Octavian Strunilă	€100,000
Romania	Desafio: Aventura	Pro TV	Season 1, 2026: Marius "Dumbo" Alexandru; Season 2, 2027: Upcoming season	Daniel Pavel	€150,000
United States (Spanish)	Desafío 20.06	GenTV	Season 1, 2006: Alejandro Kenig	Sissi Fleitas	$100,000
United States (Spanish)	Desafío: La Gran Batalla	Univision	Season 1, 2010: Yunior Puig	Michel Brown	$100,000
United States (Spanish)	La isla: desafío extremo	Telemundo	Season 1, 2024: Adrián Di Monte; Season 2, 2025: Gary Centeno	Javier Poza	$200,000

== See also ==
- Expedición Róbinson
- Survivor
