= Desafio: Aventura =

- Genre: Reality competition
- Based on: Desafío
- Presented by: Daniel Pavel
- Country of origin: Romania
- Original language: Romanian
- No. of seasons: 1
- No. of episodes: 40

Production
- Executive producer: Alina Iancu
- Production locations: Chumphon, Thailand
- Camera setup: Multi-camera
- Production company: Eccholine

Original release
- Network: Pro TV, Voyo

Desafio: Aventura, is a Romanian reality competition television series based on the Colombian television series Desafío. The series is hosted by Daniel Pavel. and had its premiere on January 5, 2026

Following the basic premise of other international versions of the format, it features a group of contestant who are isolated in an island and compete for cash and other prizes. The show uses a system of progressive elimination, allowing the contestants to vote off other members until only one final contestant remains and wins a cash prize.

== Format ==
The series places a group of celebrities and civilians in a remote isolated location, where they are divided into three teams by status. Each week, teams compete for the condition they will live that week, either High Beach with all amenities, Medium Beach with some amenities or Low Beach with no amenities at all. In addition, they will compete for leadership, immunity and rewards. The contestants are progressively eliminated from the game as they are voted out by their fellow contestants. The last contestant standing wins the grand prize of €150,000.

=== Challenges ===
- Territorial Challenge: The teams compete for the best living conditions, with the winners receiving the keys to High Beach, a luxury beach house with air conditioning, pool, hot water and furnished with beds. The meals of their choice are prepared by a chef. The second place team goes to Medium Beach, which provides them with basic necessities for survival, a roof, a small refrigerator, beds and a bathroom, but have a minimum ration of food and water. The third place team receives the keys to Low Beach, which has the worst living conditions, members have to live outdoors or build their own shelter, and have poor food ration and are not provided with water.
- Immunity Challenge: The teams compete for immunity from elimination.
- Reward Challenge: The teams compete for money, luxuries, food, or trips to local sites.
- Captains' Battle: Each week a team captain is appointed by vote. The captains face each other in a challenge, and the winner gets an advantage for their team in the next immunity challenge.

=== Locations and beaches ===
Each group is assigned a different beach to stay. Each beach has different qualities and benefits:

- Higher Beach/villa has a luxurious cabin with beds, showers, bathrooms and a fully equipped kitchen. In some occasions, there are employees that prepare the meals for each contestant.
- Medium Beach/the locals’ village features the bare necessities for living. Contestants have a wooden roof with hammocks to sleep. They are given pots and pans, knives, some food and tools to hunt and cook.
- Lower Beach/deserted features the worst conditions for the contestants to live in. Contestants have to build their own shelter or sleep in a cave. There is no food and the contestants have to eat fruits or try to hunt or fish what they can.

During each show, the groups have to compete in a challenge ("Territorial Challenge") to decide which group will stay on each beach. As the show progresses and contestants are eliminated, the teams are merged into a single group and they are taken to Merged Beach, which features commodities slightly better than Medium Beach.

== Production ==
=== Development ===
The show was first announced by Daniel Pavel on August 27, during the announcement of Pro TV’s fall schedule, Pavel stated that he would be the host of a new television show, a Desafio-type format. Pavel said "I have been a direct witness to many tough competitions and have seen up close all the stages of survival, but now we are preparing a completely new experience. A new project. An experience. Here, the tests of endurance and courage will be taken further than ever before. These are not just words. The very name, Desafio, represents a brand-new show. Here, strength alone is no longer enough. Strategy is no longer enough either, and emotions can no longer be hidden." After Pavel's announcement, Pro TV officially confirmed this news, with the applications for the show being open immediately for civilian contestants.

Filming for the first season took place between November 10 and December 21, 2025, in Chumphon, Thailand.

On March 30, 2026, during the broadcast of the first season, it was announced on the show’s official Facebook page that the program had been renewed for a new season, and applications opened immediately after the announcement was published.

== Series overview ==
List of Desafio: Aventura seasons
No.	Filming dates	Location	Original teams	Winner	Runner-up(s)	Prize
1	10 November – 21 December 2025	Chumphon, Thailand	Three teams of eight divided by status: "Norocoșii" (The Lucky Ones), "Luptătorii" (the Warriors), "Visătorii" (the Dreamers)	Marius "Dumbo" Alexandru	Vladimir Drăghia	€150,000
2	2026	TBA	Three teams of eight divided by status: "Norocoșii" (The Lucky Ones), "Luptătorii" (the Warriors), "Visătorii" (the Dreamers)	TBA	TBA	€150,000

== The history of Desafío in Romania ==
The series first aired in 2009 on the Kanal D named Rătăciți în Panama (Lost in Panama). The series was filmed in Bocas del Toro, Panama and premiered on September 28, 2009, featuring 18 players (nine men and nine women), divided into three tribes of six based on their occupations and degree of success in life and it was hosted by Andrei Gheorghe. The show airs on television five days per week. At the time of airing, Rătăciți în Panama was the most expensive Romanian TV show ever produced, costing over €2,000,000 to make, roughly equal to US$3,300,000 in 2023. However the €2 million investment only achieved modest audience, averaging 105,000 viewers (0.9 rating points) over the course of 60 episodes. The show's audience record (168,000 viewers and 1.4 rating points) was set during its launch on September 28, 2009. The competition's finale ranked 8th, with an average audience of only 133,000 urban viewers (1.1 rating points), according to data published by Pagina de Media.

In 2018, another edition aired on the Antena 1 named Ultimul trib (The last tribe). This series was announced by Antena 1 on 2018 and was filmed in Madagascar and hosted by Romanian actor Octavian Strunilă. The show was supposed to start on September 9 but was postponed by a week, to September 13. However it debuted with modest ratings. First episode was watched by 770,000 Romanians per minute, placing Antena 1 in third position. Declining viewership has led to changes regarding the broadcast time and the number of airing days. The show ended on April 5, 2019, after eight months on air, thus becoming one of the longest-running TV shows in Romania.

Both iterations of the series only lasted one season due to low ratings.

== Broadcast and ratings ==
Official ratings are taken from ARMA (Asociația Română pentru Măsurarea Audiențelor), the organisation that compiles audience measurement and television ratings in Romania.

Season	Network	Episodes	Premiered			Ended			TV season
Season	Network	Episodes	Date	Premiere viewers (in millions)	Rank	Date	Finale viewers (in millions)	Rank	TV season
1	Pro TV	40	January 5, 2026	1.197	#1	May 19, 2026	0.778	#2	2026
2	Pro TV	TBA	2027	TBA	#TBA	2027	TBA	#TBA	2027
