= Expedition Robinson (Swiss TV series) =

- Created by: Charlie Parsons
- Theme music composer: Andreas Nordqvist
- Country of origin: Switzerland
- Original language: German
- No. of seasons: 3 (Last season never aired)

Production
- Production company: Strix Television

Original release
- Network: TV3
- Release: 6 September 1999 – 11 June 2000

Related
- Survivor

Expedition Robinson is the Swiss version of the Swedish reality show Expedition Robinson, debuting in September 1999.

Seeing the success of the Danish, Norwegian, and Swedish versions of the show, TV3 in Switzerland decided to produce their own version of the show. Due to low ratings, the show was cancelled after just two seasons. At the time the show was cancelled, the third season was nearly done being shot. Despite this, the third season was never broadcast.

The name alludes to both Robinson Crusoe and The Swiss Family Robinson, two stories featuring people marooned by shipwrecks.

== Format ==
The Robinson format was developed by Planet 24, a United Kingdom TV production company owned by Charlie Parsons and Bob Geldof. Their company Castaway Television Productions retained the rights to the concept when they sold Planet 24 in 1999. Mark Burnett later licensed the format to create the American show Survivor in 2000.

Sixteen contestants are put into a survival situation and compete in a variety of physical challenges. Early in each season two teams compete but later on the teams are merged and the competitions become individual. At the end of each show one contestant is eliminated from the show by the others in a secret "island council" ballot.

== Seasons ==
Year	Host	Channel	Location	Days	Participants	Winner
1999	Silvan Grütter	TV3 (Note: The third season was never aired on television due to the station's network being shut down for financial reasons. The winner was only revealed later in a news article.)	Johor, Malaysia	50	16	Andreas Widmer
2000	Silvan Grütter	TV3	Johor, Malaysia	50	18	Stefanie Ledermann
2002	Silvan Grütter	TV3	Johor, Malaysia		14	Carole Haari
