= Teleset =

Colombian production company

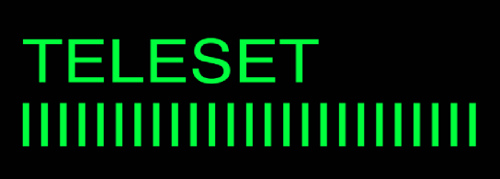
- Type: Private
- Industry: Television
- Founded: 1995; 31 years ago
- Headquarters: Bogotá, Colombia
- Products: Television shows
- Parent: Sony Pictures Television International (January–April 2009); Sony Pictures Television International Production (April 2009–present)
- Divisions: Teleset Mexico
- Website: teleset.com.co at the Wayback Machine (archived 2016-01-10)

Sony Pictures Television – Latin America & U.S. Hispanic, doing business as Teleset, is a television production company based in Bogotá, Colombia. It produced Metástasis, the Spanish-language remake of Breaking Bad.

Teleset's portfolio contains popular telenovelas such as La Baby Sister, The Useless One, Love in Custody and Three Miracles. Working hand in hand with Sony Pictures Television through its International Production division, Teleset has been a pioneer in the TV series genre with programs such as Rosario Tijeras, La prepago, Metástasis, Niñas mal, Popland, Lady, La sellera derosas, La Reina del Flow, El Mariachi and En la mouth of the wolf, among others. In the entertainment part, Teleset has produced Colombian versions of formats such as ¿Quién quiere ser millonario?, Robinson Expedition, El Factor X, Popstars and Colombia has talent, among others.

== History ==
Teleset was founded in 1995 and is one of Colombia's largest independent television producers. On January 29, 2009, Sony Pictures Television International acquired a 50% stake in the company. On April 1, 2009, Sony Pictures Entertainment consolidated Teleset with its other US and international television companies under the SPT roof such as 2waytraffic, Embassy Row, Starling, and Lean-M. Teleset also has a division in Mexico.

== Titles ==
The company's productions include:

- La Reina del Flow
- Amor en Custodia
- El Auténtico Rodrigo Leal
- La Baby Sister
- Rosario Tijeras
- Juegos Prohibidos
- Marido a Sueldo
- Los Protegidos
- El Inútil
- Isa TK+
- Señorita Pólvora

Teleset has also produced local versions of the following foreign series:

Foreign series	Colombian version
Hole in the Wall	Duro contra el muro
Breaking Bad	Metástasis
Dancing with the Stars	Bailando por un Sueño
PokerFace	El Jugador
Popstars	Popstars Colombia
Survivor	Expedición Róbinson
Who Wants to Be a Millionaire?	¿Quién quiere ser millonario?
The X Factor	El Factor X
