= Desafio: Aventura season 1 =

Desafio: Aventura
- Season 1
- Presented by: Daniel Pavel
- No. of castaways: 24
- Winner: Marius "Dumbo" Alexandru
- Runner-up: Vladimir Drăghia
- Location: Chumphon, Thailand
- No. of episodes: 40

Release
- Original network: Pro TV, Voyo
- Original release: January 5 – May 19, 2026

Additional information
- Filming dates: 10 November – 21 December 2025

Season chronology
- Next → TBA

Desafio: Aventura season 1 is the first season of Desafio: Aventura, a Romanian television series based on the popular reality game show Desafío. The season featured 24 contestants divided into three teams: "Norocoșii" (The Lucky Ones), "Luptătorii" (the Warriors), "Visătorii" (the Dreamers). The series is hosted by Daniel Pavel and the premiere being scheduled for January 5, 2026.

The season finale took place on May 19, 2026, when Marius "Dumbo" Alexandru was crowned the winner of the competition and awarded the grand prize of €150,000. He secured the victory after winning the final challenge against Vladimir Drăghia. Dumbo decided to give €30,000 to each of the other three contestants, keeping €60,000 for himself.

== Format ==
The series places a group of celebrities and civilians in a remote isolated location, where they are divided into three teams by status. Each week, teams compete for the condition they will live that week, either High Beach with all amenities, Medium Beach with some amenities or Low Beach with no amenities at all. In addition, they will compete for leadership, immunity and rewards. The contestants are progressively eliminated from the game as they are voted out by their fellow contestants. The last contestant standing wins the grand prize of €150.000.

=== Challenges ===
- Territorial Challenge: The teams compete for the best living conditions, with the winners receiving the keys to High Beach, a luxury beach house with air conditioning, pool, hot water and furnished with beds. The meals of their choice are prepared by a chef. The second place team goes to Medium Beach, which provides them with basic necessities for survival, a roof, a small refrigerator, beds and a bathroom, but have a minimum ration of food and water. The third place team receives the keys to Low Beach, which has the worst living conditions, members have to live outdoors or build their own shelter, and have poor food ration and are not provided with water.
- Immunity Challenge: The teams compete for immunity from elimination.
- Reward Challenge: The teams compete for money, luxuries, food, or trips to local sites.
- Captains' Battle: Each week a team captain is appointed by vote. The captains face each other in a challenge, and the winner gets an advantage for their team in the next immunity challenge.

=== Locations and beaches ===
Each group is assigned a different beach to stay. Each beach has different qualities and benefits:

- Higher Beach/villa has a luxurious cabin with beds, showers, bathrooms and a fully equipped kitchen. In some occasions, there are employees that prepare the meals for each contestant.
- Medium Beach/the locals’ village features the bare necessities for living. Contestants have a wooden roof with hammocks to sleep. They are given pots and pans, knives, some food and tools to hunt and cook.
- Lower Beach/deserted features the worst conditions for the contestants to live in. Contestants have to build their own shelter or sleep in a cave. There is no food and the contestants have to eat fruits or try to hunt or fish what they can.

During each show, the groups have to compete in a challenge ("Territorial Challenge") to decide which group will stay on each beach. As the show progresses and contestants are eliminated, the teams are merged into a single group and they are taken to Merged Beach, which features commodities slightly better than Medium Beach.

== Production ==
=== Development ===
The show was first announced by Daniel Pavel on August 27, during the announcement of Pro TV's fall schedule, Pavel stated that he would be the host of a new television show, a Desafio-type format. Pavel said "I have been a direct witness to many tough competitions and have seen up close all the stages of survival, but now we are preparing a completely new experience. A new project. An experience. Here, the tests of endurance and courage will be taken further than ever before. These are not just words. The very name, Desafio, represents a brand-new show. Here, strength alone is no longer enough. Strategy is no longer enough either, and emotions can no longer be hidden." After Pavel's announcement, Pro TV officially confirmed this news, with the applications for the show being open immediately for civilian contestants.

Filming for this season took place between November 10 and December 21, 2025, in Chumphon, Thailand

=== Broadcast ===
The show broadcast twice a week, on Mondays and Tuesdays, starting at 8:30 p.m. Starting on 11 May, two weeks before the grand final, the show's broadcast time was moved one hour later, airing at 9:30 p.m. instead of 8:30 p.m.

== Contestants ==
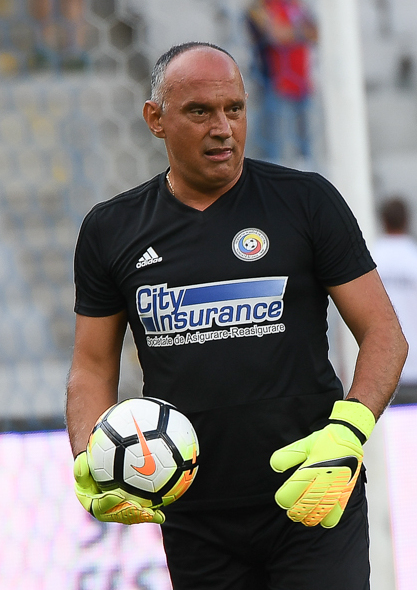
Florin Prunea

The contestants were revealed starting on October 27, 2025. Among them were several notable names, such as former goalkeeper for the national football team, Florin Prunea, actor Vladimir Drăghia, manele singer Babasha, tapper Ian and Valentin Tănase, the fastest Romanian sprinter.

They are divided into three teams of eight based on their lifestyle; "Norocoșii" (The Lucky Ones) are those used to comfort, "Luptătorii" (the Fighters) are those who know what hardship means and never give up, and "Visătorii" (the Dreamers) are those who wish to change destinies.

On Week 17, the seven remaining players merged into one tribe.

List of Desafio: Aventura season 1 contestants
| Contestant | Original team | Post-Swap team (Note: In Episode 14, after Dumbo, the representative of the "Luptătorii" team, won the Captains' Battle, he was given the right to choose a teammate to move with him to another team. Dumbo chose Vladimir, and both of them moved to the "Norocoșii" team.) | Switch team | Post-Swap (Note: In Episode 28, the teams were reorganized after the "Visătorii" won a strategic advantage, which consisted of the possibility to propose two players from their own team to move to the "Luptătorii" team in order to balance the two tribes. Vladimir and Delia volunteered to make this change, thus contributing to restoring balance in the competition.) | Merged team | Finish |
|---|---|---|---|---|---|---|
| Nicoleta Mirea 55, Bucharest Nutritionist | Visătorii | | | | | Quit; Episode 2 |
| Andreea Boldeanu 26, Craiova, Dolj Flight attendant | Visătorii | | | | | 1st eliminated Episode 4 |
| Nicolae Lupșor 44, Marbella, Spain Bodybuilder | Norocoșii | | | | | Quit; Episode 6 |
| Alina Ceban 27, Bucharest Chief operating officer | Norocoșii | | | | | 2nd eliminated Episode 8 |
| Delia Salchievici (Returned to game) | Norocoșii | | | | | 3rd eliminated Episode 10 |
| Nadin Gherman 21, Constanța, Constanța Shepherd | Visătorii | | | | | Medically evacuated Episode 11 |
| Beatrice "Bettyshor" Ungureanu 27, Bucharest Fashion designer | Norocoșii | | | | | 4th eliminated Episode 12 |
| Vlad "Babasha" Babașa 23, Bacău, Bacău Manele music singer | Luptătorii | Luptătorii | | | | 5th eliminated Episode 14 |
| Aurora Ghinoiu 24, Galați, Galați Composer | Visătorii | Visătorii | | | | 6th eliminated Episode 16 |
| Cristina Aiello 29, Bucharest Tennis coach | Visătorii | Visătorii | Visătorii | | | 7th eliminated Episode 18 |
| Sergiu Călifar 36, Bucharest Interior designer | Norocoșii | Norocoșii | Luptătorii | | | 8th eliminated Episode 20 |
| Luiza Condrea 29, Bucharest Manager | Luptătorii | Luptătorii | Luptătorii | | | 9th eliminated Episode 22 |
| Florin Prunea 57, Bucharest Former goalkeeper | Norocoșii | Norocoșii | Luptătorii | | | 10th eliminated Episode 24 |
| Cezar Amititeloaie 44, Iași, Iași Holistic therapist | Luptătorii | Luptătorii | Luptătorii | | | 11th eliminated Episode 26 |
| Lucian "Leopardu'" Vasile 24, Bolintin Deal, Giurgiu Transport company administrator | Visătorii | Visătorii | Visătorii | Visătorii | | 12th eliminated Episode 28 |
| Iuliana Dup 27, Iași, Iași Milliner | Luptătorii | Luptătorii | Luptătorii | Luptătorii | | 13th eliminated Episode 30 |
| Codruța Sanfira Filip 30, Tătăruși, Iași Artist | Norocoșii | Norocoșii | Visătorii | Visătorii | | 14th eliminated Episode 32 |
| Georgian Bogdan "Ian" Anghel 29, Berceni, Ilfov Trapper | Norocoșii | Norocoșii | Visătorii | Visătorii | | 15th eliminated Episode 34 |
| Delia Salchievici 24, Bucharest Tarot card reader | Norocoșii | None (Note: Delia was not assigned a tribe during the tribe swap due to being eliminated.) | Visătorii | Luptătorii | Merged; Team | 16th eliminated Episode 36 |
| Alina "Lena" Oprea 37, Bucharest Chief marketing officer | Luptătorii | Luptătorii | Luptătorii | Luptătorii | Merged; Team | 17th eliminated Episode 37 |
| Codruța "Coco" Meilă 20, Oradea, Bihor Professional MMA fighter | Luptătorii | Luptătorii | Luptătorii | Luptătorii | Merged; Team | 18th eliminated Episode 38 |
| Rafael Szabo 25, Lugoj, Timiș Gymnast | Visătorii | Visătorii | Visătorii | Visătorii | Merged; Team | 19th eliminated Episode 39 |
| Valentin Tănase 28, Bucharest Athlete | Visătorii | Visătorii | Visătorii | Visătorii | Merged; Team | 20th eliminated Episode 40 |
| Vladimir Drăghia 39, Bucharest Film actor | Luptătorii | Norocoșii | Visătorii | Luptătorii | Merged; Team | Runner-up; Episode 40 |
| Marius "Dumbo" Alexandru 43, Agigea, Constanța Hunter | Luptătorii | Norocoșii | Luptătorii | Luptătorii | Merged; Team | Winner; Episode 40 |

== Season summary ==
Challenge winners and eliminations by cycle
| Episode(s) | | Challenge winner(s) | | | | | | | Nominated | Eliminated | Finish |
| Episode(s) | | Territory | | | Second chance | Reward | Immunity | Capitans | Nominated | Eliminated | Finish |
| No. | Original air date | High | Medium | Low | Second chance | Reward | Immunity | Capitans | Nominated | Eliminated | Finish |
|---|---|---|---|---|---|---|---|---|---|---|---|
| 1 & 2 | 5 & 6 January 2026 | Norocoșii | Luptătorii | Visătorii | | | Luptătorii | Valentin | Alina | Nicoleta | Quit; Episode 2 |
| 1 & 2 | 5 & 6 January 2026 | Norocoșii | Luptătorii | Visătorii | | | Luptătorii | Valentin | Nicoleta | Nicoleta | Quit; Episode 2 |
| 3 & 4 | 12 & 13 January 2026 | In the second week, there was no Territory Challenge, so the three teams kept their initial territories | | | | Visătorii | Norocoșii | Nadin | Andreea | Andreea | 1st Eliminated; Episode 4 |
| 3 & 4 | 12 & 13 January 2026 | In the second week, there was no Territory Challenge, so the three teams kept their initial territories | | | | Visătorii | Norocoșii | Nadin | Lena | Andreea | 1st Eliminated; Episode 4 |
| 5 & 6 | 19 & 20 January 2026 | Luptătorii | Visătorii | Norocoșii | | | Luptătorii | Coco | Nicolae | Nicolae | Quit; Episode 6 |
| 5 & 6 | 19 & 20 January 2026 | Luptătorii | Visătorii | Norocoșii | | | Luptătorii | Coco | Rafael | Nicolae | Quit; Episode 6 |
| 7 & 8 | 26 & 27 January 2026 | In the fourth week, there was no Territory Challenge, so the three teams kept their initial territories | | | | Luptătorii | Visătorii | Iuliana | Alina | Alina | 2nd Eliminated; Episode 8 |
| 7 & 8 | 26 & 27 January 2026 | In the fourth week, there was no Territory Challenge, so the three teams kept their initial territories | | | | Luptătorii | Visătorii | Iuliana | Babasha | Alina | 2nd Eliminated; Episode 8 |
| 9 & 10 | 2 & 3 February 2026 | Luptătorii | Visătorii | Norocoșii | | | Visătorii | Rafael | Babasha | Delia | 3rd Eliminated; Episode 10 |
| 9 & 10 | 2 & 3 February 2026 | Luptătorii | Visătorii | Norocoșii | | | Visătorii | Rafael | Delia | Delia | 3rd Eliminated; Episode 10 |
| 11 & 12 | 9 & 10 February 2026 | In the sixth week, there was no Territory Challenge, so the three teams kept their initial territories | | | | Valentin [Leopardu'] | Visătorii | Codruța | Babasha | Nadin | Evacuated; Episode 11 |
| 11 & 12 | 9 & 10 February 2026 | In the sixth week, there was no Territory Challenge, so the three teams kept their initial territories | | | | Bettyshor [Codruța] | Visătorii | Codruța | Babasha | Nadin | Evacuated; Episode 11 |
| 11 & 12 | 9 & 10 February 2026 | In the sixth week, there was no Territory Challenge, so the three teams kept their initial territories | | | | Iuliana [Coco] | Visătorii | Codruța | Bettyshor | Bettyshor | 4th Eliminated; Episode 12 |
| 13 & 14 | 16 & 17 February 2026 | Luptătorii | Visătorii | Norocoșii | | | Norocoșii | Dumbo | Rafael | Babasha | 5th Eliminated; Episode 14 |
| 13 & 14 | 16 & 17 February 2026 | Luptătorii | Visătorii | Norocoșii | | | Norocoșii | Dumbo | Babasha | Babasha | 5th Eliminated; Episode 14 |
| 15 & 16 | 23 & 24 February 2026 | In the eight week, there was no Territory Challenge, so the three teams kept their initial territories | | | | Visătorii | Norocoșii | Vladimir | Lena | Aurora | 6th Eliminated; Episode 16 |
| 15 & 16 | 23 & 24 February 2026 | In the eight week, there was no Territory Challenge, so the three teams kept their initial territories | | | | Visătorii | Norocoșii | Vladimir | Aurora | Aurora | 6th Eliminated; Episode 16 |
| 17 & 18 | 2 & 3 March 2026 | Luptătorii | Visătorii | —N/a | Delia (Note: In episode 17, Delia won the Second Chance Battle against Aurora and Bettyshor, thus returning to the competition as part of the "Visătorii" team, which was at that moment one member short.) | | Luptătorii | Coco | Cristina | Cristina | 7th Eliminated; Episode 18 |
| 17 & 18 | 2 & 3 March 2026 | Luptătorii | Visătorii | —N/a | Delia | | Luptătorii | Valentin | Delia | Cristina | 7th Eliminated; Episode 18 |
| 19 & 20 | 9 & 10 March 2026 | In the tenht week, there was no Territory Challenge, so the three teams kept their initial territories | | | | Visătorii | Visătorii | Cezar | Lena | Sergiu | 8th Eliminated; Episode 20 |
| 19 & 20 | 9 & 10 March 2026 | In the tenht week, there was no Territory Challenge, so the three teams kept their initial territories | | | | Visătorii | Visătorii | Cezar | Sergiu | Sergiu | 8th Eliminated; Episode 20 |
| 21 & 22 | 16 & 17 March 2026 | Visătorii | Luptătorii | —N/a | | | Visătorii | Dumbo | Luiza | Luiza | 9th Eliminated; Episode 22 |
| 21 & 22 | 16 & 17 March 2026 | Visătorii | Luptătorii | —N/a | | | Visătorii | Dumbo | Lena | Luiza | 9th Eliminated; Episode 22 |
| 23 & 24 | 23 & 24 March 2026 | In the twelfth week, there was no Territory Challenge, so the three teams kept their initial territories | | | | Vladimir [Rafael] | Visătorii | Ian | Florin | Florin | 10th Eliminated; Episode 24 |
| 23 & 24 | 23 & 24 March 2026 | In the twelfth week, there was no Territory Challenge, so the three teams kept their initial territories | | | | Dumbo [Cezar] | Visătorii | Ian | Dumbo | Florin | 10th Eliminated; Episode 24 |
| 25 & 26 | 30 & 31 March 2026 | Visătorii | Luptătorii | —N/a | | | Visătorii | Leopardu' | Cezar | Cezar | 11th Eliminated; Episode 26 |
| 25 & 26 | 30 & 31 March 2026 | Visătorii | Luptătorii | —N/a | | | Visătorii | Leopardu' | Dumbo | Cezar | 11th Eliminated; Episode 26 |
| 27 & 28 | 6 & 7 April 2026 | In the fourteenth week, there was no Territory Challenge, so the three teams kept their initial territories | | | | Visătorii | Luptătorii | Rafael [Ian] | Leopardu' | Leopardu' | 12th Eliminated; Episode 28 |
| 27 & 28 | 6 & 7 April 2026 | In the fourteenth week, there was no Territory Challenge, so the three teams kept their initial territories | | | | Visătorii | Luptătorii | Rafael [Ian] | Ian | Leopardu' | 12th Eliminated; Episode 28 |
| 29 & 30 | 13 & 14 March 2026 | Luptătorii | Visătorii | —N/a | | | Visătorii | Valentin | Lena | Iuliana | 13th Eliminated; Episode 30 |
| 29 & 30 | 13 & 14 March 2026 | Luptătorii | Visătorii | —N/a | | | Visătorii | Valentin | Iuliana | Iuliana | 13th Eliminated; Episode 30 |
| 31 & 32 | 20 & 21 April 2026 | In the sixteenth week, there was no Territory Challenge, so the three teams kept their initial territories | | | | Luptătorii | Luptătorii | Dumbo | Rafael | Codruța | 14th Eliminated; Episode 32 |
| 31 & 32 | 20 & 21 April 2026 | In the sixteenth week, there was no Territory Challenge, so the three teams kept their initial territories | | | | Luptătorii | Luptătorii | Dumbo | Codruța | Codruța | 14th Eliminated; Episode 32 |
| 33 & 34 | 27 & 28 April 2026 | Visătorii | Luptătorii | —N/a | | | Luptătorii | Vladimir [Dumbo] | Ian, Rafael (Note: Because Valentin was granted immunity due to his participation in the Captains' Battle, Ian and Rafael were automatically sent to the duel, with no vote required.) | Ian | 15th Eliminated; Episode 34 |
| 35 & 36 | 4 & 5 May 2026 | With the merger of the teams, the Territory Challenge was removed from the competition. As a result, all seven remaining contestants lived together on the Middle Island. | | | | | | Dumbo, Rafael | Delia | Delia | 16th Eliminated; Episode 36 |
| 35 & 36 | 4 & 5 May 2026 | With the merger of the teams, the Territory Challenge was removed from the competition. As a result, all seven remaining contestants lived together on the Middle Island. | | | | | | Dumbo, Rafael | Lena | Delia | 16th Eliminated; Episode 36 |
| 37 & 38 | 11 & 12 May 2026 | With the merger of the teams, the Territory Challenge was removed from the competition. As a result, all seven remaining contestants lived together on the Middle Island. | | | | | | Dumbo | Coco | Lena | 17th Eliminated; Episode 37 |
| 37 & 38 | 11 & 12 May 2026 | With the merger of the teams, the Territory Challenge was removed from the competition. As a result, all seven remaining contestants lived together on the Middle Island. | | | | | | Dumbo | Lena | Lena | 17th Eliminated; Episode 37 |
| 37 & 38 | 11 & 12 May 2026 | With the merger of the teams, the Territory Challenge was removed from the competition. As a result, all seven remaining contestants lived together on the Middle Island. | | | | | | Dumbo, Vladimir | Coco | Coco | 18th Eliminated; Episode 38 |
| 37 & 38 | 11 & 12 May 2026 | With the merger of the teams, the Territory Challenge was removed from the competition. As a result, all seven remaining contestants lived together on the Middle Island. | | | | | | Dumbo, Vladimir | Valentin | Coco | 18th Eliminated; Episode 38 |
| 39 & 40 | 18 & 19 May 2026 | With the merger of the teams, the Territory Challenge was removed from the competition. As a result, all seven remaining contestants lived together on the Middle Island. | | | | | | Dumbo, Vladimir | Rafael, Valentin | Rafael | 19th Eliminated; Episode 39 |
| 39 & 40 | 18 & 19 May 2026 | With the merger of the teams, the Territory Challenge was removed from the competition. As a result, all seven remaining contestants lived together on the Middle Island. | | | | | | | | Valentin | 20th Eliminated; Episode 40 |
| 39 & 40 | 18 & 19 May 2026 | With the merger of the teams, the Territory Challenge was removed from the competition. As a result, all seven remaining contestants lived together on the Middle Island. | | | | | | | | Vladimir | Runner-up; Episode 40 |
| 39 & 40 | 18 & 19 May 2026 | With the merger of the teams, the Territory Challenge was removed from the competition. As a result, all seven remaining contestants lived together on the Middle Island. | | | | | | | | Dumbo | Winner; Episode 40 |

== Episodes ==
| No. overall | No. in series | Title | Original release date | RO viewers (millions) |
|---|---|---|---|---|
| 1 | 1 | "Episode 1" | 5 January 2026 | 1.19 |
The 24 contestants met at Wat Thung Sai Thong Temple in Chumphon Province, where the opening ceremony of the competition took place. The event marked a symbolic introduction to the show’s universe. The contestants also spent their first night at the temple, which was the only time the three teams slept together.: Territorial Challenge: In this challenge, the contestants were required to transport and secure wooden beams located on the ocean shore onto ceremonial carts. Once the beams were fixed, two contestants from each team entered the wheels to set the carts in motion, while the remaining team members pushed the cart to control its direction. Along the route, the teams encountered several checkpoints guarded by the Naga serpent. At these checkpoints, the contestants had to climb in order to retrieve balls necessary to continue the race. The final stage of the challenge took place at towers featuring serpent-shaped statues, where the teams were required to place the four balls onto the tongues of the statues. The team "Norocoșii" finished the challenge first and won the villa. "Luptătorii" placed second and were sent to the fishing village, while "Visătorii" finished last and were sent to the desert. After arriving in their territories, each team had to designate its leader for the Captains’ Battle. The "Norocoșii" team nominated Sergiu, the "Visătorii" team chose Valentin, while Babasha volunteered to participate in the battle for the "Luptătorii" team.; Captains' Battle: In this challenge, the three captains competed while wearing the full armor of the captains from Thailand, which weighed 20 kilograms. They had to complete a complex obstacle course designed to test their strength, endurance, and skill. The challenge began with crossing a section made up of logs using a plank, without touching the ground. The contestants were then required to break through a wooden gate using a battering ram. After this stage, they dug their way under a net obstacle in order to retrieve their spear. Using the spear, the captains climbed a bamboo obstacle and then pierced the image of a guardian to continue along the course. With the same spear, each contestant had to retrieve one of the two talismans, which had to be brought back to the base to complete the challenge. The final battle took place between Sergiu and Valentin, after Babasha decided to withdraw, having failed to pass the first obstacle. In the end, Valentin emerged victorious, securing the win for the "Norocoșii" team and earning the advantage of blocking an opposing player in the next challenge.
| 2 | 2 | "Episode 2" | 6 January 2026 | 1.08 |
Immunity Challenge: In this challenge, each team moves toward its designated area, identified by a color code visible at the starting section of the course. The course is action-based and requires teams to overcome several consecutive obstacles. The first stage consists of a zigzag course, followed by crossing a rope net pyramid. After this, participants must pass through a tunnel made of netting, which leads to the final obstacle of the course. At the end of the course, each team must obtain a fishing device, which is mandatory to continue the challenge. Using this device, team members must fish two small fish, which are contained inside metal balls. Next, each team designates a runner. The runner’s task is to assemble the two fish onto a bamboo frame placed in the ocean.; Vladimir was unable to participate in this challenge, as he was blocked by Valentin before the start of the competition. Following the first round, the team "Norocoșii" finished in last place, while the teams "Visătorii" and "Luptătorii" qualified for the second round of the challenge. In the second round, the two qualified teams were required to repeat the entire obstacle course. This time, the difficulty of the challenge was reduced, with each team having to assemble only four small fish on the bamboo frame. At the end of the challenge, the team "Luptătorii" was the first to complete the task and won Immunity, thus gaining protection for the next stage of the competition. After the challenge, the team "Visătorii" expressed their intention to nominate Nicoleta and Andreea for elimination, as both were considered weaker competitors. Within the team "Norocoșii", the voting discussion took place between Nicolae, whose leadership behavior had caused discomfort among some teammates, and Alina, whose performance was considered weak. In the end, Alina was sent to the Duel from the team "Norocoșii", while Nicoleta was nominated from the team "Visătorii".: Elimination Duel: At the beginning of the duel, the two contestants were required to push a heavy chest through the sand to a bamboo tripod. Upon reaching the tripod, they found the key needed to open the chest. Inside the chest were the tools necessary to retrieve the challenge pieces. The contestants had to collect eight pieces, of which only five were correct and could be used to form a traditional Thai mask. Nicoleta decided to withdraw from the competition during the course, therefore Alina C. remained in the competition.
| 3 | 3 | "Episode 3" | 12 January 2026 | 1.05 |
Reward Challenge: The challenge involved three members from each team entering the course simultaneously. Depending on the moment they entered the course, each contestant had to overcome one of the following obstacles: a bamboo pyramid, a balance beam, or a rope net bridge. After completing the obstacle, the contestants reached a basket containing coconuts. Each participant was required to take one coconut, break it open, and hold the coconut water in their mouth without swallowing it. The contestants then returned to the finish line, where they poured the liquid through a funnel into a shared team container. The winning team was "Norocoșii", who were the first to successfully fill the container with coconut water. As a reward, the team won a night in the Kingdom of Coconut. In addition, the team selected Valentin to receive an individual reward of €3,000; Captains' Battle:Throughout the entire challenge, the three contestants were tied together at the hands, having to perform all movements under this constraint. The contestants were required to pass underneath an obstacle, then move beneath a net, reaching three panels. At each panel, they had to open a box containing two lassos, but were allowed to take only one lasso. With the selected lasso, the contestants returned to the finish line, navigating the same obstacles, where they had to secure the lasso onto a horizontal bar. After successfully securing it, the team returned to retrieve the second lasso, which was fixed in the same manner. Nadin defeated Cezar and Bettyshor, earning the right to choose a contestant from another team who would have to compete in the next challenge blindfolded, as a disadvantage.
| 4 | 4 | "Episode 4" | 13 January 2026 | N/A |
Immunty Challenge: The contestants were required to navigate a maze in order to reach stations where water buffaloes were located, positioned under protective nets. Upon arrival, the participants had to free the buffaloes from the nets and then transport them back through the maze. At the end of the course, the water buffaloes had to be parked on designated wooden racks placed in the finish area. The challenge tested the contestants’ orientation skills, teamwork, and physical strength. Following the first round, the team "Visătorii" finished in last place, while the teams "Norocoșii" and "Luptătorii" qualified for the second round of the challenge. At the end of the challenge, the team "Norocoșii" led by Nicolae was the first to complete the task and won Immunity, thus gaining protection for the next stage of the competition. During this challenge, Dumbo competed while blindfolded, as a disadvantage imposed following the decision made by Nadin in the previous challenge.; Back at the villa, due to his performance in the challenge, earned the respect of Bettyshor and Delia, who had previously shown their intention to nominate him. In the "Visătorii" tribe, Andreea opened up to her teammates and revealed that she suffers from multiple sclerosis. In the fishing village, where the members of the "Luptătorii" tribe are accommodated, Vladimir accused Lena of having an overly arrogant and confrontational attitude and proposed her for elimination, which further intensified tensions within the tribe. In the end Andreea was sent to the duel on behalf of the "Visătorii" tribe due to weak performance in the challenges while Lena was nominated for the duel as a result of her behavior during the game and in the camp, which was considered problematic by her teammates, "Luptătorii".: Elimination duel For the duel, the two contestants were positioned on a 6-meter tower, from which they had to fish out metal pieces, later used to construct a ladder for descending. Once on the ground, the contestants navigated an obstacle course to reach machetes, which they used to release the tip of a spear. This tip was then used to break a ceramic plate, revealing a disc and seven wooden sticks. At the final stage, on a pyramid-shaped board, the discs had to be secured using the sticks and placed into a basket located on the unseen side of the wooden board.; Andreea was unable to complete the challenge and was eliminated.
| 5 | 5 | "Episode 5" | 19 January 2026 | 0.92 |
Territorial Challenge: The three teams started with six members tied together in a net located in the sea. They moved out of the water and worked together to pass under several obstacles. At the end of the course, the team reached a wooden frame where one member retrieved a key from a basket. Using the key, the contestants freed themselves from the net. After being released, each member individually completed the final obstacle. The team that brought all of its members to the finish won the challenge. The team "Luptătorii" finished the challenge first and won the villa. "Visătorii" placed second and were sent to the fishing village, while "Norocoșii" finished last and were sent to the desert; Captains' Battle:The three competitors started from the farthest point of the course. They first had to crawl under a bamboo obstacle, then pass through a net tunnel. Afterward, they reached a set of crates containing puzzle pieces, which had to be placed on designated platforms. The first competitor to complete a stable structure won the challenge. Coco defeated Leopardu’ and Alina, earning the advantage that allowed her team to switch roles in the next challenge
| 6 | 6 | "Episode 6" | 20 January 2026 | 1.02 |
Immunty Challenge: The Immunity Challenge was a team-based challenge focused on cohesion and coordination. Each team was required to transport a teammate using platforms while navigating various obstacles, without allowing the teammate to touch the ground. The transported contestant had to collect tiles from crates placed in a tower, after which the teams moved to the final podium, where the contestant built a structure with the tiles up to the number 28. Coco won an advantage that allowed role changes during the challenge, and Dumbo replaced Lena in the final stage. "Luptătorii" won both rounds of the challenge and secured immunity.; Back at their camps, the "Norocoșii" decided to send Nicolae to the duel due to his selfish behavior. Meanwhile, Rafael from the "Visătorii" tribe volunteered for elimination. Both teams ultimately stuck with their decisions, and Nicolae and Rafael entered the duel.: Elimination duel: In the duel, the two contestants cleared coconuts from a platform to retrieve a hidden weight, which they used to release three bags needed to open a chest. Using the steps inside, they built a ladder to access a bag of balls, which were used to break ceramic caps and unlock a spinning drum. After finding chalk in the hay, they solved a calculation on a board, with the first to finish winning the duel.; Although Nicolae won the duel, he chose to give up his place to Rafael. As a result, Rafael remained in the competition.
| 7 | 7 | "Episode 7" | 26 January 2026 | N/A |
Reward Challenge: At the beginning of each round, Dan showed the contestants a letter, which they had to memorize. At his signal, members of each team ran to the end of the course, where several cushions marked with different letters were placed. The contestants had to identify the two cushions corresponding to the displayed letter, pick them up, and carry them back while continuing to run the course. A point was awarded to the team that correctly returned the cushion with the requested symbol. The first team to accumulate 10 points won the challenge. The team "Luptătorii" was declared the winner and received a dinner and a Thai massage as a reward. Additionally, the sum of €4,000 was awarded to Dumbo, chosen by the team to receive the money; Captains' Battle: In this battle, entitled "The Rhinoceros Bird Course", the three team captains were required to reconstruct the shape of the rhinoceros bird using five wooden pieces collected along an obstacle-filled course, while being immobilized at the hands and feet and using only their fingers and teeth. The first contestant to complete the structure won both the advantage and the reward. Iuliana defeated Sergiu and Cristina, earning the right to designate two people to wear leg weights during the Immunity Challenge. In addition, she won bread rolls, which she chose to give to the team "Norocoșii".
| 8 | 8 | "Episode 8" | 27 January 2026 | 0.95 |
Immunty Challenge: A basket containing balls in each team’s color was placed in front of every team. Each contestant had to select a ball from an opposing team’s basket, carry it up a net ramp to a moving platform, and throw it into a basket. Each time a ball landed in a basket, the team whose color matched the ball lost a life; after seven such hits, a team was eliminated from the round. The teams "Luptătorii" and "Visătorii" formed a pact to eliminate the team "Norocoșii" in the first round, which they successfully accomplished. As a result of the advantage won in the Captains' Battle, Iuliana chose Ian and Sergiu, members of the team "Norocoșii", to wear leg weights. In the end, the team Visătorii won both rounds and secured immunity.; In the team "Norocoșii", both Alina and Bettyshor, feeling like outsiders, believed that Florin was the source of tension and should be eliminated, while Florin considered Alina to still be the team’s weakest link. During the elimination ceremony, both Alina and Bettysor volunteered for the duel on behalf of "Norocoșii", but in the end, Alina received all the votes. In the team "Luptătorii", Babasha was nominated by the entire team at his own request.: Elimination duel: The two duelists were tied with a harness from the start and had to free themselves to complete the course. At the end, positioned at height, the contestants had to strike an element from a Buddhist temple with a hammer to win the challenge. Babasha was faster than Alina and won the duel, eliminating her from the game.
| 9 | 9 | "Episode 9" | 2 February 2026 | 0.96 |
Territorial Challenge: Each team appoints a player who starts the course from an offshore platform and must swim to the shore. Once on land, the player is transported by teammates using two suspended platforms, from which the player retrieves the balls attached to three wooden poles. Once recovered, the player must place the balls, two at a time, into each of the three basketball hoops. The team "Luptătorii", led by Vladimir, pulled far ahead of the other two teams and won the villa once again. "Visătorii" remained in the fishing village, while "Norocoșii" returned to the desert.; Captains' Battle: The "Dig and Break" challenge is an individual competition for the team captains. They must pass through a series of obstacles, then dig in a marked area to find a chest and a crowbar. After breaking open the chest, the contestants retrieve a machete, which they use to clear their way through the next two obstacles. The final stage involves releasing a log shaped like a key, which must be transported, rotated, and passed through an opening in a panel, then secured with ropes to function as a pendulum. Using this pendulum, the captains must knock over a vessel placed on a platform. The first contestant to topple the vessel wins the challenge. In the end, Rafael defeated Ian and Luiza and won the advantage of blocking two contestants from the opposing team in the next game.
| 10 | 10 | "Episode 10" | 3 February 2026 | N/A |
Immunty Challenge: The contestants entered the game in pairs. The first pair started from the podium with three balls, which had to be transported one by one using sticks to a checkpoint, where they were placed on a rack. After the balls reached a tall mesh hoop, the second pair entered the game and built a long stick from nine elements, using it to lift the three balls to the hoop’s opening. After all the balls were placed, the last contestant had to throw them, trying to get them into three hoops. In the final stage, two contestants operated a bar on a patterned panel, using two ropes to push the balls to the top of a slope. Rafael used the advantage he had won in the Captains' Battle and blocked Cezar for this challenge. The team "Visătorii" pulled ahead and finished the race first. The pairs Florin–Sergiu from "Norocoșii" and Babasha–Coco from "Luptătorii" encountered difficulties and failed to place any balls. After 50 minutes of play, the remaining two teams had the opportunity to switch pairs. After another 20 minutes, they were given 7 more minutes to complete the challenge. Since neither "Luptătorii" nor "Norocoșii" managed to finish, the second round did not take place, and "Visătorii" became automatically immune.; Back in the desert, Delia and Ian grew increasingly close, which affected the team dynamics. Florin, Sergiu, Codruța, and Bettyshor were bothered by Delia's authoritarian attitude during the challenges and considered her suitable for elimination, with Ian as the next nominee if they lost again. Meanwhile, Ian tried to sway Florin to his side, arguing that he, Florin, and Codruța were the ones benefiting the team, while Bettyshor, Sergiu, and Delia were holding the group back. At the nomination ceremony, the team "Norocoșii" maintained their initial proposal, so Delia was sent to duel against Babasha, who had self-nominated once again from "Luptătorii".: Elimination duel: In the duel, the two contestants first have to release several wooden planks. Once released, they must transport each platform through the obstacle windows to a stack. After collecting all the platforms, they transport them through a net tunnel to a wooden portal, where they build a stable, tall tower to climb and reach a suspended board in the net. Once the board is retrieved, the contestants move on to the final challenge, where they must construct a pyramid-shaped castle from small planks. The first to complete the construction wins the duel. Babasha finished first, and Delia became the third contestant eliminated.

== Voting history ==
| | Original Teams | | | | | | | | | | | | | | | | | | | Post-Swap Teams | | | | | | Switch Teams | | | | | | | | | | | | | | | Post-Swap Teams | | | | | | | | | | | Merged Teams | | | | | | | | | | | | |
|---|---|---|---|---|---|---|---|---|---|---|---|---|---|---|---|---|---|---|---|---|---|---|---|---|---|---|---|---|---|---|---|---|---|---|---|---|---|---|---|---|---|---|---|---|---|---|---|---|---|---|---|---|---|---|---|---|---|---|---|---|---|---|---|---|
| Week # | 1 | | | 2 | | | 3 | | | 4 | | | 5 | | | 6 | | | | 7 | | | 8 | | | 9 | | | 10 | | | 11 | | | 12 | | | 13 | | | 14 | | | 15 | | | 16 | | | 17 | | 18 | | | 19 | | | | | | 20 | | | |
| Episode # | 2 | | | 4 | | | 6 | | | 8 | | | 10 | | | 11 | 12 | | | 14 | | | 16 | | | 18 | | | 20 | | | 22 | | | 24 | | | 26 | | | 28 | | | 30 | | | 32 | | | 34 | | 36 | | | 37 | | | 38 | | | 39 | 40 | | |
| Eliminated | Nomination vote | | Nicoleta | Nomination vote | | Andreea | Nomination vote | | Nicolae | Nomination vote | | Alina | Nomination vote | | Delia | Nadin | Nomination vote | | Bettyshor | Nomination vote | | Babasha | Nomination vote | | Aurora | Nomination vote | | Cristina | Nomination vote | | Sergiu | Nomination vote | | Luiza | Nomination vote | | Florin | Nomination vote | | Cezar | Nomination vote | | Leopardu' | Nomination vote | | Iuliana | Nomination vote | | Codruța | Nomination vote | Ian | Nomination vote | | Delia | Nomination vote | | Lena | Nomination vote | | Coco | Rafael | Valentin | Vladimir | Dumbo |
| Nominated | Alina | Nicoleta | | Andreea | Lena | | Nicolae | Rafael | | Alina | Babasha | | Babasha | Delia | | | Babasha | Bettyshor | | Rafael | Babasha | | Lena | Aurora | | Delia | Cristina | | Lena | Sergiu | | Luiza | Lena | | Florin | Dumbo | | Cezar | Dumbo | | Leopardu' | Ian | | Lena | Iuliana | | Rafael | Codruța | | Ian & Rafael | | Delia | Lena | | Coco | Lena | | Coco | Valentin | | Rafael & Valentin | | | |
| Vote | 8-0 | 7-1 | Duel (Note: Nicoleta quit the duel, therefore Alina remained in the competition.) | 8-0 | 6-1-1 | Duel | 8-1 | 6-0 | Duel (Note: Although Nicolae won the duel, he chose to give up his place to Rafael. As a result, Rafael remained in the competition.) | 7-0 | 8-0 | Duel | 7-1 | 3-2-1 | Duel | No vote (Note: No vote; Nadin was medically evacuated. No vote occurred for his removal.) | 7-1 | 5-0 | Duel | 3-2 | 6-0 | Duel | 5-0 | 3-2 | Duel | 5-2 | 1-0 | Duel | 6-1 | 1-0 (Note: The contestant who participated in the Captains' Battle had to directly nominate a member of the team.) | Duel | 3-2-1 | 1-0 | Duel | 4-1 | 1-0 | Duel | 3-2 | 1-0 | Duel | 3-1 | 1-0 | Duel | 4-1 | 1-0 | Duel | 2-1 | 1-0 | Duel | No vote (Note: Because Valentin was granted immunity due to his participation in the Captains' Battle, Ian and Rafael were automatically sent to the duel, with no vote required.) | Duel | 5-1 | 1-0 | Duel | 4-1 | 1-0 | Duel | 3-1 | 1-0 | Duel | Duel | Challenge | | |
| Voter | Vote | | | | | | | | | | | | | | | | | | | | | | | | | | | | | | | | | | | | | | | | | | | | | | | | | | | | | | | | | | | | | | | |
| Dumbo | — | | | — | Lena | — | — | | | — | Babasha | — | Babasha | — | — | — | Babasha | — | — | — | | | — | | | — | | | Lena | —N/a | — | —N/a | Lena | — | Florin | — | Won | Lena | — | Won | — | | | Lena | —N/a | — | — | | | — | | —N/a | Lena | — | —N/a | Lena | — | Coco | —N/a | — | Saved | Won | Sole Survivor | |
| Vladimir | — | | | — | Lena | — | — | | | — | Babasha | — | Babasha | — | — | — | Babasha | — | — | — | | | — | | | Delia | —N/a | — | — | | | — | | | — | | | — | | | — | | | Lena | —N/a | — | — | | | — | | Delia | —N/a | — | Coco | —N/a | — | —N/a | Valentin | — | Saved | Won | Runner-up | |
| Valentin | — | Nicoleta | — | Andreea | — | — | — | Rafael | — | — | | | — | | | — | — | | | Rafael | — | — | — | Aurora | — | —N/a | Cristina | — | — | | | — | | | — | | | — | | | Leopardu' | —N/a | — | — | | | Rafael | —N/a | — | Immune | — | Delia | —N/a | — | Coco | —N/a | — | Valentin | —N/a | Won | Won | Eliminated | | |
| Rafael | — | Nicoleta | — | Andreea | — | — | — | Rafael | Eliminated | — | | | — | | | — | — | | | Valentin | — | Won | — | Aurora | — | Delia | —N/a | — | — | | | — | | | — | | | — | | | —N/a | Ian | — | — | | | Rafael | —N/a | Won | Nominated | Won | Delia | —N/a | — | Coco | —N/a | — | Coco | —N/a | — | Eliminated | | | |
| Coco | — | | | — | Luiza | — | — | | | — | Babasha | — | Babasha | — | — | — | Babasha | — | — | — | Babasha | — | Lena | — | — | — | | | Dumbo | —N/a | — | Florin | —N/a | — | —N/a | Dumbo | — | Cezar | —N/a | — | — | | | Lena | —N/a | — | — | | | — | | Delia | —N/a | — | Coco | —N/a | Won | Coco | —N/a | Eliminated | | | | |
| Lena | — | | | — | Lena | Won | — | | | — | Babasha | — | Babasha | — | — | — | Babasha | — | — | — | Babasha | — | Lena | — | Won | — | | | Lena | —N/a | Won | Luiza | —N/a | Won | Dumbo | —N/a | — | Cezar | —N/a | — | — | | | Lena | —N/a | Won | — | | | — | | Lena | —N/a | Won | Lena | —N/a | Eliminated | | | | | | | |
| Delia | Alina | — | — | — | | | Nicolae | — | — | Alina | — | — | — | Bettyshor | Eliminated | | | | | | | | | | | Delia | —N/a | Won | — | | | — | | | — | | | — | | | — | | | —N/a | Iuliana | — | — | | | — | | Delia | —N/a | Eliminated | | | | | | | | | | |
| Ian | Alina | — | — | — | | | Nicolae | — | — | Alina | — | — | — | Ian | — | — | — | Bettyshor | — | — | | | — | | | Delia | —N/a | — | — | | | — | | | — | | | — | | | Ian | —N/a | Won | — | | | —N/a | Codruța | —N/a | Nominated | Eliminated | | | | | | | | | | | | | |
| Codruța | Alina | — | — | — | | | Nicolae | — | — | Alina | — | — | — | Delia | — | — | — | Bettyshor | — | — | | | — | | | Cristina | —N/a | — | — | | | — | | | — | | | — | | | Leopardu' | —N/a | — | — | | | Codruța | —N/a | Eliminated | | | | | | | | | | | | | | | |
| Iuliana | — | | | — | Babasha | — | — | | | — | Babasha | — | Babasha | — | — | — | Babasha | — | — | — | Cezar | — | Lena | — | — | — | | | Lena | —N/a | — | Florin | —N/a | — | Florin | —N/a | — | Cezar (Note: As the vote was tied, the immune contestant cast the deciding vote.) | Dumbo | — | — | | | Iuliana | —N/a | Eliminated | | | | | | | | | | | | | | | | | | |
| Leopardu' | — | Nicoleta | — | Andreea | — | — | — | Rafael | — | — | | | — | | | — | — | | | Valentin | — | — | — | Aurora | — | Delia | —N/a | — | — | | | — | | | — | | | — | | | Leopardu' | —N/a | Eliminated | | | | | | | | | | | | | | | | | | | | | |
| Cezar | — | | | — | Lena | — | — | | | — | Babasha | — | Babasha | — | — | — | Babasha | — | — | — | Babasha | — | Lena | — | — | — | | | —N/a | Sergiu | — | Luiza | —N/a | — | Florin | —N/a | — | Lena | —N/a | Eliminated | | | | | | | | | | | | | | | | | | | | | | | | |
| Florin | Alina | — | — | — | | | Alina | — | — | Alina | — | — | — | Delia | — | — | — | Bettyshor | — | — | | | — | | | — | | | Lena | —N/a | — | Luiza | —N/a | — | Florin | —N/a | Eliminated | | | | | | | | | | | | | | | | | | | | | | | | | | | |
| Luiza | — | | | — | Lena | — | — | | | — | Babasha | — | Babasha | — | — | — | Babasha | — | — | — | Babasha | — | Lena | — | — | — | | | Lena | —N/a | — | Lena | —N/a | Eliminated | | | | | | | | | | | | | | | | | | | | | | | | | | | | | | |
| Sergiu | Alina | — | — | — | | | Nicolae | — | — | Alina | — | — | — | Delia | — | — | — | Bettyshor | — | — | | | — | | | — | | | Sergiu | —N/a | Eliminated | | | | | | | | | | | | | | | | | | | | | | | | | | | | | | | | | |
| Cristina | — | Nicoleta | — | Andreea | — | — | — | Rafael | — | — | | | — | | | — | — | | | Rafael | — | — | — | Leopardu' | — | Cristina | —N/a | Eliminated | | | | | | | | | | | | | | | | | | | | | | | | | | | | | | | | | | | | |
| Aurora | — | Nicoleta | — | Andreea | — | — | — | Rafael | — | — | | | — | | | — | — | | | Rafael | — | — | — | Leopardu' | Eliminated | | | | | | | | | | | | | | | | | | | | | | | | | | | | | | | | | | | | | | | |
| Babasha | — | | | — | Lena | — | — | | | — | Babasha | Won | Dumbo | — | Won | — | Vladimir | — | Won | — | Babasha | Eliminated | | | | | | | | | | | | | | | | | | | | | | | | | | | | | | | | | | | | | | | | | | |
| Bettyshor | Alina | — | — | — | | | Nicolae | — | — | Alina | — | — | — | Ian | — | — | — | Bettyshor | Eliminated | | | | | | | | | | | | | | | | | | | | | | | | | | | | | | | | | | | | | | | | | | | | | |
| Nadin | — | Nicoleta | — | Andreea | — | — | — | Rafael | — | — | | | — | | | Evacuated | | | | | | | | | | | | | | | | | | | | | | | | | | | | | | | | | | | | | | | | | | | | | | | | |
| Alina | Alina | — | —N/a | — | | | Nicolae | — | — | Alina | — | Eliminated | | | | | | | | | | | | | | | | | | | | | | | | | | | | | | | | | | | | | | | | | | | | | | | | | | | | |
| Nicolae | Alina | — | — | — | | | Nicolae | — | Won | | | | | | | | | | | | | | | | | | | | | | | | | | | | | | | | | | | | | | | | | | | | | | | | | | | | | | | |
| Andreea | — | Nicoleta | — | Andreea | — | Eliminated | | | | | | | | | | | | | | | | | | | | | | | | | | | | | | | | | | | | | | | | | | | | | | | | | | | | | | | | | | |
| Nicoleta | — | Andreea | Quit | | | | | | | | | | | | | | | | | | | | | | | | | | | | | | | | | | | | | | | | | | | | | | | | | | | | | | | | | | | | | |

== Ratings ==
| Episode | Original airdate | Timeslot (EET) | National | | | | Commercial (21–54 Urban ABCD) | | | Source |
| Episode | Original airdate | Timeslot (EET) | Rank | Viewers (in thousands) | Rating (%) | Share (%) | Rank | Rating (%) | Share (%) | Source |
|---|---|---|---|---|---|---|---|---|---|---|
| 1 | January 5, 2026 | Monday, 20:30 | #1 | 1.197 | 6.9 | 17.7 | #2 | 5.6 | 18.8 | |
| 2 | January 6, 2026 | Thursday, 20:30 | #1 | 1.085 | 6.2 | 16.4 | #2 | 5.4 | 18.7 | |
| 3 | January 12, 2026 | Monday, 20:30 | #1 | 1.050 | 6.0 | 16.0 | #2 | 5.6 | 18.4 | |
| 4 | January 13, 2026 | Thuersay, 20:30 | —N/a | —N/a | —N/a | —N/a | —N/a | —N/a | —N/a | —N/a |
| 5 | January 19, 2026 | Monday, 20:30 | #1 | 923 | 5.3 | 12.4 | #1 | 5.5 | 20.6 | |
| 6 | January 20, 2026 | Thursday, 20:30 | #1 | 1.026 | 5.9 | 15.5 | #2 | 5.2 | 18.1 | |
| 7 | January 26, 2026 | Monday, 20:30 | —N/a | —N/a | —N/a | —N/a | —N/a | —N/a | —N/a | —N/a |
| 8 | January 27, 2026 | Thursday, 20:30 | #1 | 950 | 5.4 | 14.6 | #2 | 5.5 | 19.8 | |
| 9 | February 2, 2026 | Monday, 20:30 | #1 | 960 | —N/a | —N/a | #2 | —N/a | —N/a | |
| 10 | February 3, 2026 | Thursday, 20:30 | —N/a | —N/a | —N/a | —N/a | —N/a | —N/a | —N/a | —N/a |
| 11 | February 9, 2026 | Monday, 20:30 | #2 | —N/a | —N/a | —N/a | #2 | 4.9 | 17.6 | |
| 12 | February 10, 2026 | Thursday, 20:30 | #2 | —N/a | —N/a | —N/a | #2 | 4.2 | 16.7 | |
| 13 | February 16, 2026 | Monday, 20:30 | —N/a | —N/a | —N/a | —N/a | —N/a | —N/a | —N/a | —N/a |
| 14 | February 17, 2026 | Thursday, 20:30 | —N/a | —N/a | —N/a | —N/a | —N/a | —N/a | —N/a | —N/a |
| 15 | February 23, 2026 | Monday, 20:30 | —N/a | —N/a | —N/a | —N/a | —N/a | —N/a | —N/a | —N/a |
| 16 | February 24, 2026 | Thursday, 20:30 | —N/a | —N/a | —N/a | —N/a | —N/a | —N/a | —N/a | —N/a |
| 17 | March 2, 2026 | Monday, 20:30 | #1 | 823 | 4.7 | 14.3 | #1 | 4.7 | 18.5 | |
| 18 | March 3, 2026 | Thursday, 20:30 | #1 | 815 | —N/a | —N/a | # | —N/a | —N/a | |
| 19 | March 9, 2026 | Monday, 20:30 | —N/a | —N/a | —N/a | —N/a | —N/a | —N/a | —N/a | —N/a |
| 20 | March 10, 2026 | Thursday, 20:30 | #1 | —N/a | —N/a | —N/a | #1 | 5.6 | 19.6 | |
| 21 | March 16, 2026 | Monday, 20:30 | —N/a | —N/a | —N/a | —N/a | —N/a | —N/a | —N/a | —N/a |
| 22 | March 17, 2026 | Thursday, 20:30 | #1 | —N/a | 6.5 | —N/a | #2 | 5.5 | —N/a | |
| 23 | March 23, 2026 | Monday, 20:30 | #2 | 882 | —N/a | —N/a | #1 | 5.4 | 20.6 | |
| 24 | March 24, 2026 | Thursday, 20:30 | —N/a | —N/a | —N/a | —N/a | —N/a | —N/a | —N/a | —N/a |
| 25 | March 30, 2026 | Monday, 20:30 | #2 | —N/a | 4.7 | 14.1 | #2 | 4.1 | 17.6 | |
| 26 | March 31, 2026 | Thursday, 20:30 | —N/a | —N/a | —N/a | —N/a | —N/a | —N/a | —N/a | —N/a |
| 27 | April 6, 2026 | Monday, 20:30 | —N/a | —N/a | —N/a | —N/a | —N/a | —N/a | —N/a | —N/a |
| 28 | April 7, 2026 | Thursday, 20:30 | —N/a | —N/a | —N/a | —N/a | —N/a | —N/a | —N/a | —N/a |
| 29 | April 13, 2026 | Monday, 20:30 | —N/a | —N/a | —N/a | —N/a | —N/a | —N/a | —N/a | —N/a |
| 30 | April 14, 2026 | Thursday, 20:30 | —N/a | —N/a | —N/a | —N/a | —N/a | —N/a | —N/a | —N/a |
| 31 | April 20, 2026 | Monday, 20:30 | —N/a | —N/a | —N/a | —N/a | —N/a | —N/a | —N/a | —N/a |
| 32 | April 21, 2026 | Thursday, 20:30 | —N/a | —N/a | —N/a | —N/a | —N/a | —N/a | —N/a | —N/a |
| 33 | April 27, 2026 | Monday, 20:30 | #2 | 722 | 4.1 | 12.9 | #2 | 4.0 | 15.8 | |
| 34 | April 28, 2026 | Thursday, 20:30 | #2 | 757 | 4.3 | 13.9 | #2 | 4.2 | 17.1 | |
| 35 | May 4, 2026 | Monday, 20:30 | #2 | 645 | 3.7 | 12.2 | #2 | 3.7 | 15.2 | |
| 36 | May 5, 2026 | Thursday, 20:30 | #2 | 839 | —N/a | —N/a | —N/a | —N/a | —N/a | |
| 37 | May 11, 2026 | Monday, 21:30 | —N/a | —N/a | —N/a | —N/a | —N/a | —N/a | —N/a | —N/a |
| 38 | May 12, 2026 | Thursday, 21:30 | —N/a | —N/a | —N/a | —N/a | —N/a | —N/a | —N/a | —N/a |
| 39 | May 18, 2026 | Monday, 21:30 | —N/a | —N/a | —N/a | —N/a | —N/a | —N/a | —N/a | —N/a |
| 40 | May 19, 2026 | Thursday, 21:30 | #2 | 778 | 4.5 | 16.5 | #2 | 4.6 | 20.5 | |
