= Expedition Robinson 1999 (Switzerland) =

- Season 1
- Presented by: Silvan Grütter
- No. of days: 50
- No. of castaways: 16
- Winner: Andreas Widmer
- Runner-up: Silvia Herzog
- Location: Johor, Malaysia
- No. of episodes: 14

Release
- Original network: TV3
- Original release: September 6 – December 4, 1999

Season chronology
- Next → 2000

Expedition Robinson 1999 is the first season of the Swiss reality television series Expedition Robinson. The season was presented by journalist Silvan Grütter and had 16 Swiss compete into two tribes of eight against each other in Johor, Malaysia for 50 days, fighting for rewards, immunity and the grand prize of 50,000 Fr. The season premiered on 6 September 1999 on TV3 and concluded on 4 December 1999 where Andreas Widmer won in an unknown jury vote against Silvia Herzog to win the grand prize and be crowned the title of Robinson.

== Contestants ==
List of Expedition Robinson 1999 contestants
Contestant	Original Tribe	Merged Tribe	Finish
Elisa Choi; 26, Zürich	North Team		1st Voted Out; Day 3
Annette Berbig; 33, Thurgau	South Team		2nd Voted Out; Day 7
Anita Ruiz; 31, Schwerzenbach	South Team		3rd Voted Out; Day 11
Alex Riedi; 32, Riehen	South Team		4th Voted Out; Day 15
Isabella Crescini; 36, Zürich	North Team		5th Voted Out; Day 19
Olav Brunner; 59, Bassersdorf	South Team		6th Voted Out; Day 23
Roland Schedler; 28, Adliswil	South Team	Robinson	7th Voted Out; Day ?
Katharina Fahrni; 24, Thurgau	South Team	Robinson	8th Voted Out; 1st Jury Member; Day ?
Michael Bächtiger; 26, Zürich	North Team	Robinson	9th Voted Out; 2nd Jury Member; Day ?
Riccarda Andri; 26, Chur	South Team	Robinson	10th Voted Out; 3rd Jury Member; Day 40
Dominik “Dodo” Jud; 22, Wallisellen	South Team	Robinson	11th Voted Out; 4th Jury Member; Day 43
Carlo Herger; 40, Altdorf	North Team	Robinson	12th Voted Out; 5th Jury Member; Day 45
Gérard Rupp; 26, Fribourg	North Team	Robinson	13th Voted Out; 6th Jury Member; Day 47
Edith Müller; 45, Langenthal	North Team	Robinson	14th Voted Out; 7th Jury Member; Day 49
Silvia Herzog; 26, Emmen	North Team	Robinson	Runner-up; Day 50
Andreas Widmer; 37, Geroldswil	North Team	Robinson	Robinson; Day 50
