= Expedition Robinson 2000 (Switzerland) =

- Season 2
- Presented by: Silvan Grütter
- No. of days: 50
- No. of castaways: 18
- Winner: Stefanie Ledermann
- Runner-up: Martina Pérez
- Location: Johor, Malaysia
- No. of episodes: 12

Release
- Original network: TV3
- Original release: March 12 – June 11, 2000

Season chronology
- ← Previous; 1999

Expedition Robinson 2000, was the second and final season of the Swiss version of the reality show Expedition Robinson, or Survivor as it is referred to in some countries to air in Switzerland and it was broadcast on TV3 from March 12, 2000 to June 11, 2000.

== Season summary ==
An immediate twist that occurred this season was that the contestants were initially split into two tribes based on gender. In episode one, Daniel Sauter suffered an injury at camp and had to be evacuated from the game. Sauter was later replaced by Hansjürg Binzegger. Both Alessandra Angiuli and Manfred Breitschmid were eliminated from the game in episode two when the contestants were split up into two tribes of seven, one being the Nordcamp (North Team) and the other being the Südcamp (South team), based on a school yard style pick. Following a duel in episode four, South Team member Sascha Negele was moved to the North Team. In episode six the two tribes merged into the Tengah tribe and shortly after the fifth tribal council the "black vote" twist was introduced into the game. The black vote twist allowed a player that was voted out at one tribal council to cast a vote at the following tribal council. In episode seven, a joker, Ivana Bolzano, entered the game. When it came time for the final five, the contestants took part in a series of challenges in which the winner would be able to eliminate any of the losers they wanted to. Maddalena Haug, Sascha Negele, and Dayana Zgraggen all failed to win a challenge and were eliminated. Ultimately, it was Stefanie Ledermann who won this season over Martina Pérez with 5-3 jury vote.

== Finishing order ==
Contestant	Original Tribes	Episode 2 Tribe	Merged Tribe	Finish
Daniel Sauter; 28, Winterthur	Men			Evacuated; Day 1
Alessandra Angiuli; 19, Therwil	Women	None		Not Picked; Day ?
Manfred Breitschmid; 41, Fahrweid	Men	None		Not Picked; Day ?
Natalie Rieder; 26, Wahlen	Women	South Team		1st Voted Out; Day ?
Christoph Fricker; 25, Bern	Men	North Team		2nd Voted Out; Day ?
Buba Rieder; 47, Zizers	Women	South Team		3rd Voted Out; Day ?
Annelies Künzli; 26, Thun	Women	North Team		4th Voted Out; Day ?
Marco Guanziroli; 29, Winterthur	Men	North Team	Tengah	5th Voted Out; Day 29
Samuel "Noodlez" Hubschmid; 23, Bern	Men	North Team	Tengah	6th Voted Out; 1st Jury member Day ?
Thomas Geiges; 58, Herrliberg	Men	North Team	Tengah	7th Voted Out; 2nd Jury member Day ?
Hansjürg Binzegger; 34, Zug	Men	South Team	Tengah	8th Voted Out; 3rd Jury Member; Day ?
Ivana Ethel Balzano; 23, Schwyz			Tengah	9th Voted Out; 4th Jury Member; Day ?
Andreas Haas; 40, Würenlos	Men	South Team	Tengah	10th Voted Out; 5th Jury Member; Day ?
Sascha Negele; 26, Chur	Men	South Team	Tengah	11th Voted Out; 6th Jury Member; Day ?
Dayana Zgraggen; 24, Erstfeld	Women	North Team	Tengah	12th Voted Out; 7th Jury Member; Day ?
Maddalena Haug; 46, Zürich	Women	North Team	Tengah	13th Voted Out; 8th Jury Member; Day ?
Martina Pérez; 26, Schlieren	Women	South Team	Tengah	Runner-Up; Day 50
Stefanie Ledermann; 25, Bern	Women	South Team	Tengah	Sole Survivor; Day 50

== Voting history ==
	Original Tribes					Post Duel		Merged Tribe										
Episode #:	1	2			3	4	5	6	7	8	9	10	11	12				
Eliminated:	Daniel; No vote	Alessandra; No vote	Manfred; No vote	Natalie; 5/7 votes	Christoph; 6/7 votes	Buba; 4/5 votes	Annelies; 6/7 votes	Marco; 9/10 votes	Noodlez; 6/11 votes	Thomas; 5/10 votes^{1}	Hansjürg; 6/9 votes	Ivana; 6/8 votes	Andreas; 5/7 votes	Sascha; 1/1 vote	Dayana; 1/1 vote	Maddalena; 1/1 vote	Martina; 3/8 votes	Stefanie; 5/8 votes
Voter	Vote																	
Stefanie		South		Natalie		Buba		Marco	Noodlez	Thomas	Sascha	Ivana	Andreas	Sascha	Dayana		Jury Vote	
Martina		South		Natalie		Buba		Marco	Noodlez	Thomas	Hansjürg	Ivana	Andreas			Maddalena	Jury Vote	
Maddalena		North			Christoph		Annelies	Marco	Andreas	Andreas	Hansjürg	Ivana	Andreas					Stefanie
Dayana		North			Christoph		Annelies	Marco	Andreas	Andreas	Hansjürg	Ivana	Andreas					Stefanie
Sascha			South	Natalie			Annelies	Marco	Noodlez	Thomas	Hansjürg	Ivana	Andreas					Stefanie
Andreas			South	Natalie		Buba		Marco	Noodlez	Thomas	Hansjürg	Ivana	Sascha				Martina	
Ivana	Not in game								Andreas	Andreas	Sascha	Martina	Sascha				Martina	
Hansjürg	Not in game		South	Natalie		Buba		Marco	Noodlez	Thomas	Sascha	~~Sascha~~					Martina	
Thomas			North		Christoph		Annelies	Marco	Andreas	Andreas	Hansjürg							Stefanie
Noodlez			North		Christoph		Annelies	Marco	Andreas	Andreas								Stefanie
Marco			North		Christoph		Annelies	Thomas	Noodlez									
Annelies		North			Christoph		Thomas											
Buba		South		Hansjürg		Hansjürg												
Christoph			North		Marco													
Natalie		South		Buba														
Manfred			Not Picked															
Alessandra		Not Picked																
Daniel																		

^1 As both Andreas and Thomas received five votes at the sixth tribal council, it was up to Martina, as the immunity winner, to decide who would be eliminated.
