= Luis Mosquera (Colombian footballer) =

Colombian footballer (born 1989)

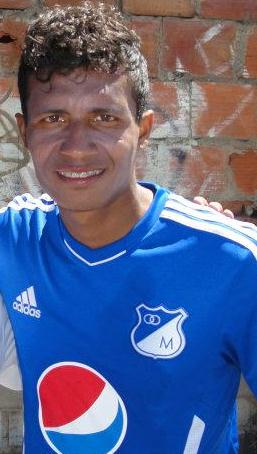
- Mosquera with Millonarios in January 2012

Personal information
- Full name: Luis Hernán Mosquera Chamorro
- Date of birth: May 25, 1989 (age 37)
- Place of birth: Leticia, Amazonas, Colombia
- Height: 1.75 m (5 ft 9 in)
- Position: Midfielder

Team information
- Current team: Millonarios
- Number: 6

Youth career
- 2008: Millonarios

Senior career*
Years	Team	Apps	(Gls)
2009–	Millonarios	192	(14)
- * Club domestic league appearances and goals as of November 14, 2010

Luis Hernán Mosquera (born 25 May 1989) is a Colombian professional footballer who plays as midfielder for Millonarios.

Mosquera is a product of the Millonarios youth system and played with the Millonarios first team since January, 2009.

== Clubs Statistics ==
(As of November 14, 2010)

Year	Team	Colombian Ligue Matches	Goals	Colombian Cup Matches	Goals	Total Matches	Total Goals
2009	Millonarios	0	0	2	0	2	0
2010	Millonarios	30	2	9	0	39	2
Total	Millonarios	30	2	11	0	41	2
