= Expedición Róbinson (Colombian TV series) =

- Genre: Reality competition
- Based on: Expedition Robinson
- Presented by: Margarita Rosa de Francisco
- Country of origin: Colombia
- Original language: Spanish
- No. of seasons: 2

Production
- Production locations: Panama (2001); Dominican Republic (2002)
- Production company: Teleset

Original release
- Network: Caracol TV
- Release: September 2, 2001 – December 8, 2002

Related
- International versions of Survivor; Desafío

Expedición Róbinson is a Colombian version of the Survivor reality television game show based on the Swedish television series Expedition Robinson originally created in 1992 by Charlie Parsons.

The show is based on stranding a group of strangers as one or more tribes in a remote location, where they must fend for food, water, fire, and shelter for themselves, while competing in challenges to earn rewards and immunity from being voted off by the tribe in progressive eliminations; the last challenger remaining at the end of the competition wins two a reward that ranges from two hundred million to three hundred million pesos prize (100–150 thousandUS$) and title of "Colombian Robinson".

Expedición Robinson aired for two seasons on Caracol TV, produced by Teleset, in 2001 and 2002. Following this, Caracol TV made their own remake called Desafio. Telesat sold the rights of Expedición Robinson to RCN TV in 2004. Both seasons were a ratings hit in Colombia and followed the same general format as the Swedish series.

== Overview ==
Expedición Róbinson rights were bought by Caracol TV in 2001. This television network produced the first two seasons of Expedition Robinson. Both seasons were hosted by former beauty queen and actress Margarita Rosa de Francisco. Two years later, rights for Expedición Robinson were sold to RCN TV. The series changed its original name to La isla de los famoS.O.S. (Famous People Island, in English), in which all contestants were celebrities of Colombia. RCN TV has produced three seasons of La Isla de los FamoS.O.S. and all three of them have been hosted by journalist Guillermo Prieto "Pirry". For its part, Caracol TV has developed a variation of the show whose name is El desafío 20-0_ (in which the last number represents the year the season has been aired. i.e. Desafío 20-08). So far, nineteen seasons of El Desafío have been aired, ten of them hosted by Margarita Rosa de Francisco.

== Season 1: Expedición Róbinson ==
The show's first season was filmed during 2001 and was aired later that year. It was set on Bocas del Toro, off the Caribbean Coast of Panama.

16 Colombians (8 women and 8 men) took part in the first season. The price was 200 million Colombian pesos. Contestants were divided into two initial tribes: Ukups and Atchas. These Guna words mean "ants" and "bees", respectively. Ukup team was represented by yellow color as Atcha team was represented by orange color.

Thirteen episodes aired weekly on Sundays. Each episode lasted an hour except the season finale which lasted two hours. Besides official episodes, "El Diario Robinson" was aired during every week the show lasted on air. It was a 15 minutes long program in which unseen scenes from each episode were shot.

The show was won by Rolando Patarroyo. He was part of the Atcha tribe, who were outnumbered by the Ukup tribe at tribal merger. He won the 200 million pesos price and was presented as "the first Colombian Robinson" He got some TV contracts but he refused to honored them. He came back to his old life. Marlon Restrepo, the runner-up of this season was rewarded with a van and work contract. He became a rapper due to his connection with the Comunas in Medellin. Marlon betrayed his tribe by lying to get his place in the competitions. Luisa Bejarano was the youngest contestant (18) and the last woman, she was the most controversial contestant for her authentic interviews and for standing up to the production team against unfair treatment and safety issues. She did not get any price but work contracts with Caracol TV and Advertising companies.

=== Participants ===
Contestant	Occupation	Original Tribe	Switched Tribe	Merged Tribe	Finish	Total votes
Ledys Patricia García; 34, Barranquilla	Unemployed	Atcha			1st Voted Out; Day 3	6
Jorge "Goyo" Lozano; 32, Bogotá	Importer of motorcycles	Atcha			2nd Voted Out; Day 6	5
Selene Varón; 41, Bogotá	Housewife	Ukup			3rd Voted Out; Day 9	7
Rosina Buitrago; 62, Bogotá	Sociologist	Atcha			4th Voted Out; Day 12	4
Catalina Jaimes; 21, Medellín	Graphic Design student	Atcha			5th Voted Out; Day 15	8
Mónica Londoño; 23, Medellín	Media Communications student	Ukup	Ukup		6th Voted Out; Day 18	4
Luis Miguel Cote; 33, Manizales	Marine Corps Officer	Atcha	Ukup	Korgi	7th Voted Out; Day 21	10
Ramón Trujillo; 28, Santa Marta	Model	Ukup	Ukup	Korgi	8th Voted Out; 1st Jury Member; Day 24	4
Pedro Luis Falla; 25, Neiva	Mathematician	Atcha	Atcha	Korgi	9th Voted Out; 2nd Jury Member; Day 27	7
Mauricio Arango; 61, Medellín	Professor of Architecture	Ukup	Ukup	Korgi	10th Voted Out; 3rd Jury Member; Day 30	4
Lorena Zuleta; 19, Tuluá	Volleyball player	Atcha	Atcha	Korgi	11th Voted Out; 4th Jury Member; Day 33	4
Rafael Barrera; 27, Barranquilla	Merchant and rancher	Ukup	Atcha	Korgi	12th Voted Out; 5th Jury Member; Day 36	3
Anny Cadena; 33, Bucaramanga	Independent artist	Ukup	Ukup	Korgi	13th Voted Out; 6th Jury Member; Day 37	6
Luisa Fernanda Bejarano; 18, Buga	Law student	Ukup	Ukup	Korgi	Eliminated; 7th Lost against Marlon; Day 38	8
Marlon Restrepo; 25, Medellín	Rap singer and dancer	Ukup	Ukup	Korgi	Runner-Up; Day 39	3
Rolando Patarroyo; 25, Bogotá	Brassware assistant	Atcha	Atcha	Korgi	Sole Survivor; Day 39	4

=== Voting history ===
	Original Tribes					Swap	Merged Tribe									
Episode #:	1	2	3	4	5	6	7	8	9	10	11	12	13			
Eliminated:	Patricia; 6/8 votes	Goyo; 4/7 votes	Selene; 7/8 votes	Rosina; 3/6 votes	Catalina; 4/5 votes	Mónica; 4/7 votes	Luis Miguel; 9/10 votes	Ramón; 4/9 votes	Pedro; 4/8 votes	Mauricio; 4/7 votes	Lorena; 4/6 votes	Rafael; 3/5 votes	Anny; 1 vote^{1}	Luisa; No vote^{2}	Marlon; 2/7 votes	Rolando; 5/7 votes
Voter	Vote															
Rolando	Patricia	Catalina		Rosina	Catalina		Luis Miguel	Ramón	Luisa	Luisa	Luisa	Rafael			Jury Vote	
Marlon			Selene			Anny	Luis Miguel	Ramón	Pedro	Mauricio	Lorena	Rafael	Anny		Jury Vote	
Luisa			Selene			Mónica	Luis Miguel	Rolando	Pedro	Mauricio	Lorena	Rafael			Marlon	
Anny			Selene			Mónica	Luis Miguel	Rolando	Pedro	Mauricio	Lorena	Luisa				Rolando
Rafael			Selene				Luis Miguel	Pedro	Pedro	Mauricio	Lorena	Anny			Marlon	
Lorena	Patricia	Catalina		Rosina	Catalina		Luis Miguel	Ramón	Luisa	Luisa	Luisa					Rolando
Mauricio			Selene			Mónica	Luis Miguel	Marlon	Marlon	Marlon						Rolando
Pedro	Patricia	Goyo		Rosina	Catalina		Luis Miguel	Ramón	Luisa							Rolando
Ramón			Selene			Mónica	Luis Miguel	Rolando								Rolando
Luis Miguel	Goyo	Goyo		Catalina	Catalina	Anny	Pedro									
Mónica			Selene			Anny										
Catalina	Patricia	Goyo		Rolando	Pedro											
Rosina	Patricia	Goyo		Luis Miguel												
Selene			Anny													
Goyo	Patricia	Catalina														
Patricia	Rosina															

^{1} Marlon won the immunity challenge and the right to be part of the Final Two. He also had to choose one of the remaining contestants to be eliminated. He chose Anny to be voted out. ^{2} Rolando and Luisa had to compete in another challenge in order to be part of the Final Two. Rolando won the challenge, so Luisa was eliminated.

=== Elimination notes ===
- Ledys Patricia - Ledys Patricia found difficulties adapting to the island. She constantly said she missed her children and isolated herself from the rest of the tribe. She didn't get along with Rosina and didn't do well during the Immunity Challenge in which she got a panic attack because the challenge was set in the sea. All those things targeted Ledys Patricia as the weakest player so she was eliminated. (voted out 6–1–1)
- Jorge "Goyo" - Reading the hints of the Immunity Challenge message (IC), tribes realized it was a physical challenge so strength was required. Rosina wanted to do this challenge but Goyo disagreed pointing out it wasn't a challenge for her. Rosina did not take Goyo's point well so they had an argument. At the end, Luis Miguel, appearing as the leader of the Atcha tribe decided Rosina had the right to be part of the Challenge. However, it turned out to be a bad idea as Rosina fell down during the challenge and had to be evacuated by the medical team. Atcha lost the IC again. Back at the camp, Rosina was welcomed by everybody but Goyo, Goyo's attitude was taken by his partners as a discourtesy and he was viewed as a troublemaker by some tribe members. On the other hand, Catalina was viewed as the person that did the less for the tribe so some people considered it was time to her to go. At the end, Goyo was narrowly eliminated (voted out 4–3)
- Selene - After losing three challenges in a row, Atcha tribe began to do well. Conflicts arose in the Ukup camp as Selene clashed with Ramón and other tribemates. Selene stated she got enough of the game and she wanted to go so she was the first Ukup eliminated. After votes were cast, she was allowed to say goodbye to their partners. The farewell speech was kept in the rest of the season. (voted out 7–1)
- Rosina - During the IC, Atchas took the advantage at first. However, Lorena got stuck trying to climb a rope ladder giving Monica a chance to take advantage to the Ukup tribe winning immunity for the third time. Back at the camp, opinions about who should go home were divided. At the end, Rosina was eliminated because she hadn't recovered from her falling during the second IC and she had still some injuries. (voted out 3-1-1-1)
- Catalina - Atchas were demoralized due to continuous challenge losing. Pedro and Rolando questioned Luis Miguel's leadership since he had become too bossy and they felt he was causing friction within the tribe. At the RC, Luis Miguel and Monica were given the chance to have a dinner outside the camps and Luis Miguel described his tribemates as lazy people to Monica. During the IC, Atcha internal tension was evident as the tribe did it terrible during the challenge and was defeated by the powerful Ukup tribe with a huge advantage. Back at the camp, Ukups were informed they had to send one of their members to the other camp, that person would be given the immunity during next TC, Rafael was sent to the Atcha camp while the Atchas were in Tribal Council (TC). At TC, Catalina was still viewed as the weakest person in the tribe so she was eliminated unanimously. Before she left, Catalina was asked to choose a person to be sent to the Ukup camp, this person would have immunity until the merge, she chose Luis Miguel. (voted out 4–1)
- Mónica - Tension around the Atcha camp disappeared as Luis Miguel was sent to the Ukup tribe. Atchas won both RC and IC. Days before, Anny had been complaining and saying she wanted to go home. However, knowing they were facing a TC soon, she cried and regretted all comments she made before and stated she wanted to stay. Everybody took her point but Marlon and Monica. Ukups considered eliminating Luisa because she had been ill but she also stated it wasn't her time to go. At the end, Monica, who was the strongest woman in the game, was surprisingly eliminated in a tight voting. (voted out 4–3)
- Luis Miguel - Tribes were merged into the new Korgi ("gannet") tribe. After the merge, former Ukup members Ramón, Luisa, Rafael, Anny and Marlon formed an alliance and they agreed to vote out the Atcha members in the next four Tribal Councils. The Ukup alliance targeted Luis Miguel, seeing him as a strong rival. Atcha members were informed that Luis Miguel had been speaking badly about them during the days he was in the Ukup tribe. Luis Miguel was considered manipulative and deceitful so he was eliminated unanimously by new Korgi tribe. (voted out 9–1)
- Ramón - Atchas realized they were going to be eliminated one by one and there was nothing they could do about it. Rolando didn't get along with Luisa so he was targeted by women of the Ukup alliance as the next person to go. However, Ramón made a huge mistake by stealing some cookies from the production team. Later on, he confessed his mistake and apologized. Questions during the TC were whether Ramón deserved to stay or should be eliminated. Atchas took this opportunity to get rid of Ramon. Marlon also voted against Ramón pointing out he (Marlon) didn't like cheating and that, if he were given the chance to write his name down his vote he would do it without hesitation. Rafael voted out against Pedro because he viewed Pedro as a bigger threat than Rolando; Mauricio voted against Marlon because he felt Marlon didn't deserve to win the Robinson. At the end, Ramon was eliminated in the most polemic and dramatic TC so far. (voted out 4-3-1-1)
- Pedro Luis - Ramón's departure was a fissure to the Ukup alliance. However, the remaining alliance stayed together. Pedro was viewed as the smartest player of former Atchas and his charm made Ukups nervous. He didn't have problems with them as did Rolando so Pedro was viewed as a strong competitor to win the game. Ukups decided to eliminate him before he became a major threat. Atchas viewed Luisa as being too lazy around camp so they targeted her. However, because Ukups were majority, Pedro was the next person to go home. (voted out 4–3–1)
- Mauricio - Mauricio openly showed his disagreement to the other Ukups for having voted out Pedro. He thought the Final Two should be the people who, by their own merits, got there instead having alliances. Although the Ukup alliance targeted Rolando, he proceeded to win immunity. Mauricio's comments got the other Ukups upset. They also thought he was trying to divide them. Luisa believed Mauricio was the Ukup member who voted out Ramón and Marlon realized it was Mauricio who had been voting against him during the two last Tribal Councils. Then, Mauricio was eliminated by all his former tribemates. (voted out 4–2–1)
- Lorena - Relationships between Rolando and Luisa, Anny and Rafael became increasingly more difficult. Even though Rolando was once again the first Ukup choice to target, he managed himself to win the IC again. Lorena, who had passed unnoticed until that moment, became the target and was eliminated by the Ukup alliance. (voted out 4–2)
- Rafael - Being the only remaining Atcha member, Rolando knew he would be eliminated unless he won next IC. Fortunately for him, during IC, he again saved himself with a crucial immunity win. Since Rolando and Luisa didn't stand each other and, Rolando had been voting for Luisa during last three TC's, Ukups thought Rolando would keep his vote once again. However, Rolando informed the Ukup alliance he would not be voting Luisa out this time. This, worried Ukup members as everyone could be potentially eliminated. Rafael tried, without success, to convince Rolando to form an alliance with him. Ukup alliance broke into two groups: Marlon and Luisa, and, Rafael an Anny. Marlon and Luisa tried to figure out who was the person Rolando would be voting for. Anny, thinking she was the person who would be eliminated, pleaded Rafael to vote for Luisa anyway, he agreed. At tribal council, Rafael did not keep his word and voted for Anny because he thought she was the person majority would be voting out. However, Rafael's thoughts proved to be wrong as Rolando, Marlon and Luisa's votes were for Rafael and he was the 12th person eliminated. (voted out 3–1–1)
- Anny - After 36 days, the Final Four were informed there wouldn't be anymore tribal councils. They would have an IC, the person who won this challenge would be one of the Final Two. Besides, this person should eliminate one of their tribemates immediately. Marlon won this challenge and he decided to eliminate Anny stating it was time for her to go.
- Luisa - Next day, Rolando and Luisa had a final challenge to define who would be the other person in the Final Two. Rolando won the challenge so Luisa was eliminated.
- Marlon - In the finals, he received votes from Luisa and Rafael. Luisa and Rafael considered Marlon had been friendly during the whole game. However, he was also considered to be two-faced since he eliminated various of his allies while playing the game.
- Rolando - Even though Rolando was viewed by the Ukups as a difficult person to deal with, he was also seen as an independent and honest person who did not lied and did not hid what he thought during the game. He also managed himself to stay in the game and fought back from a minority tribe and became the Robinson without backstabbing anyone. Besides receiving the two votes from his unconditional friends, Pedro and Lorena; Rolando also received votes from Mauricio, Anny and Ramón.

== Season 2: Expedición Róbinson: el desafío ==
Expedición Róbinson succeeded and became a hit in the Colombian audience. Caracol TV released a second season the next year, 2002. This time, the show format was changed extensively for the production of numerous 30 minute episodes. Episodes were broadcast from Sunday to Friday, and did not necessarily end with a Tribal Council elimination. Most of elimination episodes happened on Sundays.

This season was called Expedición Robinson: el desafío (desafío means challenge in English) and the chosen location to set the show was Los Haitises National Park, Dominican Republic. Challenges were more difficult than previous season and the contestants were not given any initial supplies, including food, water or matches. Both camps were given merely a water well and a machete, conditions were also extreme because camps were almost completely surrounded by mangroves and it was common both camps were invaded by mosquitos at the sunset.

The price was elevated 225 million Colombian pesos. Contestants were divided into two initial tribes: Mucaro and Kahaya, these Taíno words mean "owl" and "shark", respectively. Mucaro team was represented by red color and Kahaya team was represented by green color.

The show was won by Cristobal Echevarría. He was part of the Mucaro tribe, he made a powerful alliance at the tribal swap. This alliance was known as the Paisa alliance, since all alliance members came from that region of the Country. He won the 225 million pesos price. Camila Puerta, the runner-up, was rewarded with 20 million pesos and an expedition to Australia.

=== Participants ===
Contestant	Original Tribe	Switched Tribe	Merged Tribe	Finish	Total votes
Pilar Meira; 34, Cartagena	Kahaya			1st Voted Out; Day 3	5
César Augusto Cruz; 42, Bogotá	Kahaya			2nd Voted Out; Day 6	9
Reyna Escobar; 51, Manizales	Mucaro			3rd Voted Out; Day 9	7
Diana Márquez; 20, Cali	Mucaro	Kahaya		4th Voted Out; Day 12	6
Jean Pierre Mandonnet; 37, Barranquilla	Mucaro	Mucaro		5th Voted Out; Day 15	4
Juliana Pozzo; 26, Bucaramanga	Kahaya	Mucaro		6th Voted Out; Day 18	5
Ronald René Robles; 23, Santa Marta	Kahaya	Kahaya	Yabisi	7th Voted Out; Day 21	5
Iván Darío Correa; 37, Medellín	Kahaya	Mucaro	Yabisi	8th Voted Out; 1st Jury Member; Day 24	8
Diana Marcela Restrepo; 20, Pensilvania, Caldas	Kahaya	Mucaro	Yabisi	9th Voted Out; 2nd Jury Member; Day 27	7
Juan Gabriel León; 19, Cali	Kahaya	Mucaro	Yabisi	10th Voted Out; 3rd Jury Member; Day 30	9
Maria Carolina Lizcano; 26, Bogotá	Mucaro	Kahaya	Yabisi	11th Voted Out; 4th Jury Member; Day 33	7
Jimena Urueña; 21, Bogotá	Kahaya	Kahaya	Yabisi	12th Voted Out; 5th Jury Member; Day 36	6
Danilo García; 32, Bogotá	Mucaro	Kahaya	Yabisi	13th Voted Out; 6th Jury Member; Day 37	3
Pedro José Vera; 19, Cácota	Mucaro	Kahaya	Yabisi	14th Voted Out; 7th Jury Member; Day 38	2
Camila Puerta; 20, Medellín	Mucaro	Mucaro	Yabisi	Runner-Up; Day 39	4
Cristóbal Echevarría; 27, Medellín	Mucaro	Mucaro	Yabisi	Sole Survivor; Day 39	5

=== Voting history ===
	Original Tribes			Switched Tribes			Merged Tribe									
Episode #:	1	2	3	4	5	6	7	8	9	10	11	12	13			
Eliminated:	Pilar; 5/8 votes	César; 6/7 votes	Reyna; 7/8 votes	Diana; 5/6 votes	Jean Pierre; 4/7 votes	Juliana; 5/6 votes	Ronald; 5/10 votes^{1}	Iván; 5/9 Votes	Diana Marcela; 5/8 votes	Juan Gabriel; 4/7 votes	Carolina; 3/6 votes	Jimena; 3/5 votes	Danilo; 3/4 votes	Pedro; 1 vote	Camila; 1/7 votes	Cristóbal; 6/7 votes
Voter	Vote															
Cristóbal			Reyna		Jean Pierre	Juliana	Ronald	Carolina	Diana Marcela	Carolina	Carolina	Jimena	Danilo	Pedro	Jury Vote	
Camila			Reyna		Jean Pierre	Juliana	Ronald	Carolina	Diana Marcela	Juan Gabriel	Carolina	Jimena	Danilo		Jury Vote	
Pedro			Reyna	Diana			Juan Gabriel	Iván	Diana Marcela	Juan Gabriel	Jimena	Jimena	Danilo			Cristóbal
Danilo			Reyna	Diana			Juan Gabriel	Jimena	Diana Marcela	Juan Gabriel	Carolina	Cristóbal	Camila			Cristóbal
Jimena	Pilar	César		Diana			Juan Gabriel	Iván	Cristóbal	Juan Gabriel	Camila	Cristóbal				Cristóbal
Carolina			Reyna	Diana			Juan Gabriel	Iván	Danilo	Camila	Camila					Cristóbal
Juan Gabriel	Pilar	César			Iván	Juliana	Ronald	Iván	Diana Marcela	Cristóbal					Camila	
Diana Marcela	Pilar	César			Jean Pierre	Juliana	Ronald	Iván	Pedro							Cristóbal
Iván	Pilar	César			Jean Pierre	Juliana	Ronald	Carolina								Cristóbal
Ronald	César	César		Diana			Juan Gabriel									
Juliana	César	César			Iván	Diana Marcela										
Jean Pierre			Reyna		Iván											
Diana			Reyna	Jimena												
Reyna			Diana													
César	Pilar	Diana Marcela														
Pilar	César															

^{1} The vote was initially tied 5-5 between Ronald and Juan Gabriel, but after a revote, Pedro changed his vote so Ronald was eliminated.

=== Elimination notes ===
- Pilar - Pilar was well liked among the Kahaya tribe. She got along with everybody and was very friendly. However, she got very ill during the first night in the island. Her illness detracted strongly from her contribution to the group and she was eliminated. (voted out 5–3)
- César - Kahaya tribe found a tuberous root shrub near the camp shelter. They decided to collect some tubers to cook and eat them. However, it wasn't good idea at all as many tribe members became intoxicated, especially Diana Marcela. This weakened the tribe and they lost IC for the second time. César had been viewed as being too lazy around camp so they decided to vote him out and to keep an ill member hoping she would get better later. (voted out 6–1)
- Reyna - Reyna was a loner at Mucaro Camp. She wasn't liked by most of the tribe men who labelled her as a weak person. She wasn't well treated by Jean Pierre and Pedro either. When Mucaro lost its first IC, Reyna was eliminated unanimously. (voted out 7–1)
- Diana - A tribal swap, mixed things up. Ivan, Diana Marcela, Juan Gabriel and Juliana were traded to Mucaro; Carolina, Pedro, Danilo and Diana became part of Kahaya. Former Mucaro members found difficulties trying to adapt themselves at their new tribe camp. Furthermore, food was scarce so Jimena decided to cook the same tuber that had former Kahayas fallen ill before. The result was exactly the same, new Kahaya members became intoxicated, specially Carolina. When Carolina found out it had happened before, she got very angry, thinking it was Jimena and Ronald's plan in order to intentionally weaken the former Mucaros and get rid of one of them. However, at tribal council, Jimena and Ronald talked about how glad they were about having new tribe mates so the new Kahayas turned on Diana as she was the weakest member of the tribe. (voted out 5–1)
- Jean Pierre - Things at Kahaya camp got better and Jimena and Carolima became good friends. On the other hand, frictions and tensions appeared at Mucaro camp. The tribe swap had taken away Jean Pierre's allies and had brought a strong competition to him. Cristobal and Camila got along with Iván and Diana Marcela as they all were from the same Colombian region so they made a very strong alliance. Things weren't good between women either and Juliana and Diana Marcela began having constant arguments. Jean Pierre's cocky attitude and intentions to get rid of Iván, the strongest member of new Mucaro tribe, angered Cristobal and Camila so he was eliminated. In retaliation for being eliminated, Jean Pierre took the tribe snorkel, diving mask and some fishing devices with him. (voted out 4–3)
- Juliana - Juliana got isolated at the Mucaro tribe as frictions with Diana Marcela and Camila became more frequent. Being viewed as a very conflictive person, Juliana was unanimously eliminated. (voted out 5–1)
- Ronald - Tribes were merged into the new Yabisi (tree) tribe. It was evident both former tribes had made their own alliances so neither of them were willing to lose any member. At tribal council there was a tie between Ronald and Juan Gabriel, each one receiving 5 votes against them. Contestants were asked to vote again. This time, Pedro decided to change his vote as he wanted all original Mucaro members (Pedro, Danilo, Cristobal, Camila and Carolina) to make it to the Final 5 and he had been contemplating the possibility of getting rid of Ronald days before. Ronald was narrowly eliminated. (voted out 5-5)

== See also ==
- Desafio
