= Expedición Robinson (Ecuadorian TV series) =

- Genre: Reality competition
- Based on: Expedition Robinson
- Presented by: Marisa Sánchez
- Country of origin: Ecuador
- Original language: Spanish
- No. of seasons: 1

Original release
- Network: Teleamazonas
- Release: 28 August – 26 October 2003

Related
- International versions of Survivor

Expedición Robinson is the Ecuadorian version of the show Expedition Robinson, or Survivor as it is called in some countries. The show only ran for one season, that lasted from August 28, 2003, to October 26, 2003, and was presented by Marisa Sánchez.

== Season summary ==
The sixteen contestants were initially separated into two tribes, Akela and Bimbuka, both named after indigenous Ecuadorian words. The first major twist of the season occurred in episode threen, when both tribes were forced to vote out one member of their tribe. In episode four, the show saw its first voluntary exit as Penélope Benalcázar decided to leave the competition.

From episode five onwards, the Akela tribe began to dominate the challenges, winning two of the three immunity challenges. When it came time for the merge, the Akela tribe quickly fell apart as five of its former members were voted out in a row. When it came time for the final four, the contestants competed in two challenges to determine who would be the final two. Both Tania Tenorio and Victor Herrera lost these challenges and were eliminated. Ultimately, it was Tito Grefa, the only member of the Akela tribe to make the final five, who won the season over Francisco Gordillo with a jury vote of 6-1.

== Finishing order ==
Contestant	Original Tribes	Merged Tribe	Finish
Diego Machuca ?, Cuenca	Bimbuka		1st Voted Out; Day 3
July Intriago; 25, Manta	Akela		2nd Voted Out; Day 6
Penélope Benalcázar; 31,	Bimbuka		Left Competition; Day 7
Érika Babinsky ?, Guayaquil	Akela		3rd Voted Out; Day 9
Diana Chávez ?, Puyo	Bimbuka		4th Voted Out; Day 12
Ivonne Cevallos ?, Quito	Bimbuka		5th Voted Out; Day 15
Isaac Pico ?, Cumbayá	Akela	Robinson	6th Voted Out; Day 18
Gustavo Cevallos; 19, Quito	Akela	Robinson	7th Voted Out; 1st Jury Member; Day 21
Marcia Christiansen; 20, Manta	Akela	Robinson	8th Voted Out; 2nd Jury Member; Day 24
Jaime "Rusby" Santander	Akela	Robinson	9th Voted Out; 3rd Jury Member; Day 27
Estefanía Baquerizo; 19, Guayaquil	Akela	Robinson	10th Voted Out; 4th Jury Member; Day 30
Eldo "Vanky" Concari; 39, Salinas	Bimbuka	Robinson	11th Voted Out; 5th Jury Member; Day 33
Tania Tenorio; 24, Guayaquil	Bimbuka	Robinson	Lost Challenge; 6th Jury Member; Day 36
Víctor Alfonso Herrera; 23, Manta	Bimbuka	Robinson	Lost Challenge; 7th Jury Member; Day 37
Francisco Gordillo; 53, Quito	Bimbuka	Robinson	Runner-Up; Day 39
Tito Jacobo Grefa; 28, Tena	Akela	Robinson	Sole Survivor; Day 39
