= Robinsonekspedisjonen =

Norwegian television series

- Created by: Charlie Parsons
- Theme music composer: Andreas Nordqvist
- Country of origin: Norway
- Original language: Norwegian
- No. of seasons: 18

Production
- Production company: Strix Televisjon

Original release
- Network: TV3
- Release: 19 September 1999 – 20 March 2005
- Release: 9 September 2007 – December 2013
- Network: TV 2
- Release: 8 February 2015 – 29 May 2016
- Network: TV3
- Release: 30 August 2021 – 6 December 2022

Related
- Survivor

Robinsonekspedisjonen is a Norwegian reality television program debuting in 1999. In the fall of 1998, TV3 purchased the broadcast rights to air their own version of Expedition Robinson. The name alludes to both Robinson Crusoe and The Swiss Family Robinson, two stories featuring people marooned by shipwrecks.

== History ==
Norway was one of the first countries to adopt the Robinson format, following its success in both Sweden and Denmark. While it has never achieved as high of ratings as that of Denmark and Sweden's versions of the show, it is still considered a ratings success.

Following a two-year hiatus after the VIP season with Denmark and Sweden, Robinsonekspedisjonen returned in 2007, and has seen a season over season ratings growth since.

== Format ==
The Robinson format was developed by Planet 24, a British TV production company owned by Charlie Parsons and Bob Geldof. Their company Castaway Television Productions retained the rights to the concept when they sold Planet 24 in 1999. Mark Burnett later licensed the format to create the American show Survivor in 2000.

Sixteen contestants are put into a survival situation and compete in a variety of physical challenges. Early in each season two teams compete but later on the teams are merged and the competitions become individual. At the end of each show one contestant is eliminated from the show by the others in a secret "island council" ballot.

== Seasons ==
Year	Host	Producer	Channel	Participants	Winner
1999	Nils Ole Oftebro	Malin Kvist	TV3	16	Christer Falck
2000	Christer Falck	Malin Kvist	TV3	16	Therese Andersen
2001	Christer Falck	Malin Kvist	TV3	17	Mia Martinsen
2002	Christer Falck	Malin Kvist	TV3	18	Ann Karene Molvig
2003	Christer Falck	Malin Kvist	TV3	16	Emil Orderud
2004	Christer Falck	Malin Kvist	TV3	20	Jan Stian Gundersen
2005 (VIP)	Christer Falck	Malin Kvist	TV3	15 VIP	Tilde Fröling
2007	Christer Falck	Malin Kvist	TV3	19	Ann-Kristin Otnes
2008	Christer Falck	Malin Kvist	TV3	23	Tom Andre Tveitan
2009	Christer Falck	Malin Kvist	TV3	20	Lina Iversen
2010	Christer Falck	Malin Kvist	TV3	20	Alita Dagmar Kristensen
2011	Christer Falck	Malin Kvist	TV3	19	Lillan Ramøy
2012	Christer Falck	Malin Kvist	TV3	17	Elizabeth Nielsen
2013	Christer Falck	Malin Kvist	TV3	22	Bjørn Tore Bekkeli
2015	Christer Falck	Malin Kvist	TV 2	18	Maiken Sæther Olsen
2016	Christer Falck	Malin Kvist	TV 2	16	Thomas Larsen
2021	Silje Torp	TBD	TV3	18	Maiken Charlotte Hetle
2022	Silje Torp	TBD	TV3	20	Are Lundby Kvaal
				294	
