= Robinsonekspedisjonen 2013 =

- Season 2013
- Presented by: Christer Falck
- No. of castaways: 16
- Winner: Bjørn Tore Bekkeli
- Runner-up: Carl Eliassen
- Location: Caramoan, Philippines
- No. of episodes: 13

Release
- Original network: TV3
- Original release: September 2013 – December 2013

Season chronology
- ← Previous; Vinter Next → 2015

Robinsonekspedisjonen 2013 (also known as Robinson: Paradise vs. Robinson) is the thirteenth season of Robinsonekspedisjonen, the Norwegian version of the Swedish show Expedition Robinson. This season premiered in September 2013 and finished in early December.

The main twist this season is that all the contestants have taken part in a reality show prior to this season. Half of the contestants are veterans from previous seasons of Robinson while the other half are from the reality show Paradise Hotel. The contestants will be split into two tribes based on which format they previously took part in.

== Finishing order ==
Contestant	Original Tribes	Second Tribes	Merged Tribe	Finish
Tina Skovdal; 22, Oslo; Paradise Hotel 2013	Paradise			1st voted out Day 2
Rebecca Wolsdal; 46, Oslo season 6, 12th Place	Robinson			2nd Voted Out; Day ?
Amir Nickel; 22, Oslo; Paradise Hotel 2013	Paradise			3rd Voted out Day ?
Caroline Knutsen; 26, Oslo; Paradise Hotel 2010	Paradise			4th Voted out Day ?
Dennis Poppe Thorsen; 21, Oslo; Paradise Hotel 2012	Paradise	South tribe		5th Voted out Day ?
Silje Winther; 26, Oslo; Paradise Hotel 2011	Paradise	South tribe		6th Voted out Day ?
Kristin Gjelsvik; 26, Oslo; Paradise Hotel 2012	Paradise	South tribe		Lost a duel Day ?
Bjørn "Poppe" Thorsen; 41, Oslo season 1, 5th Place	Robinson	North tribe		Lost a duel Day ?
Nikolina Miletic; 32, Oslo season 11, 7th Place	Robinson	North tribe	Robinson	7th Voted out Day ?
Francois Elsafadi; 39, Larvik season 9, 8th Place	Robinson	North tribe	Robinson	8th Voted out 1st Jury Member; Day ?
Mikkel Isak Eira; 44, Kautokeino; Farmen 2007	Challengers	North tribe	Robinson	8th Voted out 2nd Jury Member; Day ?
Ingvild Skare Thygesen; 19, Skare; Farmen 2012	Challengers	South tribe	Robinson	Lost a duel 3rd jury member Day ?
Eivind Antonsen Segtnan; 30, Tromsø; 71 grader nord 2005	Challengers	South tribe	Robinson	9th voted out 4th Jury Member; Day ?
Mari Wedum; 28, Øyer; 71 grader nord 2010	Challengers	South tribe	Robinson	9th voted out 5th Jury Member; Day ?
David Sandem; 32, Oslo season 10, 7th Place	Robinson	North tribe	Robinson	10th voted out 6th Jury Member; Day ?
Alita Kristensen; 27, Alta season 10, Sole Survivor	Robinson	North tribe	Robinson	11th voted out 7th Jury Member; Day ?
Stian Thorbjørnsen; 30, Oslo; Paradise Hotel 2012	Paradise	South tribe	Robinson	Lost a duel 8th Jury Member; Day ?
Grete Dahle Thorsen,25 Bryne; 71 grader nord 2012	Challengers	South tribe	Robinson	12th voted out 9th Jury Member; Day ?
Hans Olaf Hess; 48, Hurum season 11, 4th Place	Robinson	North tribe	Robinson	Lost the finale challenge 10th Jury Member; Day ?
Marit Herstad; 35, Oslo season 5, 6th Place	Robinson	North tribe	Robinson	Lost the finale challenge 11th Jury Member; Day ?
Carl Eliassen; 25, Oslo; Paradise Hotel 2010	Paradise	South tribe	Robinson	Runner-up
Bjørn Tore Bekkeli; 40, Fredrikstad; Farmen 2003	Challengers	South tribe	Robinson	Sole Survivor

== Voting history ==
	Original Tribes	
Second Tribes
Individuals
Episode #:	1	
Eliminated:	Tina; 5/8 votes	
Voter	Vote	
Alita		
Amir	Tina	Safe
Carl	Tina	Safe
Caroline	Tina	Safe
David		
Dennis	Silje	Won
Francois		
Hans Olaf		
Kristin	Caroline	Safe
Marit		
Nikolina		
Poppe		
Rebecca		
Silje	Tina	Safe
Stian	Tina	Safe
Tina	Caroline	Lost
