= Robinsonekspedisjonen 2021 =

- Season 16
- Presented by: Silje Torp
- No. of days: 41
- No. of castaways: 18
- Winner: Maiken Charlotte Hetle
- Runner-up: Tor Bjarne Martiniussen
- Location: Las Terrenas, Dominican Republic

Release
- Original network: TV3
- Original release: 30 August – 29 November 2021

Season chronology
- ← Previous; 2016 Next → 2022

Robinsonekspedisjonen 2021 is the sixteenth season of the Norwegian reality television series Robinsonekspedisjonen. After TV2 cancelled the series after the 2016 season. It was meant to make a comeback in 2020 but due to the COVID-19 pandemic, the series was pushed back a year.

The new host of the series is Silje Torp with the season also filming in the Dominican Republic. The season is the first to air on TV3 since 2013 when TV2 bought the rights to the series. The season premiered on 30 August 2021.

== Contestants ==
| Contestant | Original Tribe | Swapped Tribe | Merged Tribe | Finish |
|---|---|---|---|---|
| Line Elisabeth Espevik; 29, Bergen | Yellow Team | | | 1st Voted Out; Day 2 |
| Samuel Atanasov; 20, Gulset | Red Team | | | 2nd Voted Out; Day 6 |
| Njaal Benjamin Lien; 28, Trondheim | Yellow Team | | | Left Competition; Day 7 |
| Adrian Olafsen; 23, Kristiansand | Red Team | | | Medically Evacuated; Day 9 |
| Lars Pedersen Due; 51, Halden | Yellow Team | | | 3rd Voted Out; Day 12 |
| Sana Koshnood; 32, Oslo | Yellow Team | | | 4th Voted Out; Day 15 |
| Mathias Nilsson; 31, Oslo | Red Team | Red Team | | 5th Voted Out; Day 17 |
| Nazila Emapenah; 36, Oslo | Red Team | Yellow Team | | 6th Voted Out; Day 20 |
| Henrik Cornelius Holm; 63, Bergen | Red Team | Red Team | Robinson | 7th Voted Out; 1st Jury Member; Day 23 (Note: After Henrik was voted out, he competed in a duel against Tor (who had the most votes at the previous tribal council but was not eliminated). Tor won the duel, eliminating Henrik.) |
| Nicolai Grønvold Simensen; 26, Nittedal | Yellow Team | Yellow Team | Robinson | 8th Voted Out; 2nd Jury Member; Day 26 |
| Renato Florida Kristensen; 50, Sandvika | Yellow Team | Yellow Team | Robinson | 9th Voted Out; 3rd Jury Member; Day 29 |
| Hanne Nordby; 54, Kongsvinger | Yellow Team | Yellow Team | Robinson | Quit due to Injury; 4th Jury Member; Day 31 |
| Tariq Arshad; 26, Oslo | Yellow Team | Red Team | Robinson | 10th Voted Out; 5th Jury Member; Day 32 (Note: After Tariq tied with Veronika, he competed in a duel against her and Maiken (who stayed in the game due to Hanne quitting.) Veronika and Maiken won the duel, eliminating Tariq.) |
| Linn Christine Gullhaugen Mangset; 35, Sarpsborg | Yellow Team | Yellow Team | Robinson | 11th Voted Out; 6th Jury Member; Day 36 |
| Maria Amalie Andersen; 30, Lørenskog | Red Team | Red Team | Robinson | Lost Challenge; 7th Jury Member; Day 39 |
| Veronika Helen Svartvatn; 23, Gruben | Red Team | Red Team | Robinson | Lost Challenge; 8th Jury Member; Day 39 |
| Tor Bjarne Martiniussen; 39, Evenskjer | Red Team | Yellow Team | Robinson | Runner-Up; Day 41 |
| Maiken Charlotte Hetle; 25, Trondheim | Red Team | Red Team | Robinson | Robinson; Day 41 |

== Challenges ==
| Episode | Air date | Challenges | | Eliminated | Vote | Finish |
| Episode | Air date | Reward | Immunity | Eliminated | Vote | Finish |
|---|---|---|---|---|---|---|
| Episode 1 | 30 August 2021 | Red Team | Red Team | Line | 5-4 | 1st Voted Out; Day 2 |
| Episode 2 | 6 September 2021 | | | | | 2nd Voted Out; Day TBD |

== Voting history ==
| # | Original Tribe | |
|---|---|---|
| Episode | 1 | 2 |
| Day | 2 | |
| Voted out | Line | |
| Votes | 5-4 | |
| Voter | Vote | |
| Adrian | | |
| Hanne | Line | |
| Henrik | | |
| Lars | Line | |
| Linn | Line | |
| Maiken | | |
| Maria | | |
| Mathias | | |
| Nazila | | |
| Nicolai | Line | |
| Njaal | Hanne | |
| Renato | Line | |
| Samuel | | |
| Sana | Hanne | |
| Tariq | Hanne | |
| Tor | | |
| Veronika | | |
| Line | Hanne | |
