= Expedition Robinson 2011 =

- Season 2011
- No. of castaways: 16
- Location: Caramoan, Philippines
- No. of episodes: 13

Release
- Original release: September 2011 – December 2011

Season chronology
- ← Previous; Robinsonekspedisjonen 2010

Robinsonekspedisjonen 2011, is the eleventh season of the Norwegian version of the Swedish show Expedition Robinson. This season will premiere in early September. The main twist this season is that the contestants will be divided into two tribes known as Gamle (Old) and Unge (Young) based on their ages with those in Gamle being age forty and up and those in Unge being under the age of thirty.

== Finishing order ==
Contestant	Original tribe	Merged tribe	Finish
Anita Svensson; 45, Lindesnes	Gamle		
Arild Grimsgård; 40, Alvdal	Gamle		
Beatrice Bærem; 22, Halden	Unge		
Cathrine Moen; 20, Kolbotn	Unge		
Christin Kalve; 40, Stord	Gamle		
Christina Ruste Hinna; 21, Hønefoss	Unge		
Elisabet Madsen; 25, Hornnes	Unge		
Gabriel Holta; 22, Stavanger	Unge		
Hans Christian Valstad; 23, Bærum	Unge		
Hans-Olaf Hess; 46, Hurum	Gamle		
Jon Torstein Bakken; 42, Frekhaug	Gamle		
Lillan Ramøy; 43, Nøtterøy	Gamle		
Marianne Moen; 47, Oslo	Gamle		
Morten Heierdal; 28, Furuset	Unge		
Nicolas Perle; 29, Mauritius	Unge		
Terje Pedersen; 70, Fredrikstad	Gamle		
