= Robinsonekspedisjonen 2022 =

- Season 17
- Presented by: Silje Torp
- No. of days: 42
- No. of castaways: 20
- Winner: Are Lundby Kvaal
- Runners-up: Liselotte Petersen; Andreas Carlsen
- Location: Langkawi, Malaysia
- No. of episodes: 28

Release
- Original network: TV3
- Original release: 5 September – 6 December 2022

Season chronology
- ← Previous; 2021

Robinsonekspedisjonen 2022 is the seventeenth and most recent season of the Norwegian reality television series Robinsonekspedisjonen.

This season, 20 Norwegians compete against each other in Langkawi, Malaysia to win 500,000 kroner. The main twist this season is Kembali, where contestants go after they're voted off. They compete in duels against each other for a chance to earn their spot back in the game. The season premiered on 5 September 2022 and concluded on 6 December 2022 when Are Lundby Kvaal won against Liselotte Petersen and Andreas Carlsen to claim the grand prize and the title of Robinson 2022.

== Contestants ==
| Contestant | Original Tribe | First Swapped Tribe | Second Swapped Tribe | Merged Tribe | Voted Out | Kembali | Finish |
|---|---|---|---|---|---|---|---|
| Heidi Dorris Aas; 48, Trøgstad | South Team | | | | 3rd Voted Out; Day 4 | Left Competition; Day 5 | 20th Day 5 |
| Karolina Victorsson; 47, Oslo | North Team | | | | 1st Voted Out; Day 2 | Lost Duel; Day 8 | 19th Day 8 |
| Nissen Flindt Haugstad; 50, Gol | South Team | | | | 2nd Voted Out; Day 2 | Lost Duel; Day 11 | 18th Day 11 |
| Philip Raabe; 21, Oslo | South Team | South Team | | | Left Competition; Day 12 | | 17th Day 12 |
| Robby Nordfjeldmark; 64, Porsgrunn | South Team | | | | 4th Voted Out; Day 7 | Lost Duel; Day 14 | 16th Day 14 |
| Karim Sabeur; 36, Oslo | North Team | South Team | | | 7th Voted Out; Day 16 | Lost Duel; Day 17 | 15th Day 17 |
| Knut Even Nomerstad; 26, Ottestad | South Team | South Team | | | Medically Evacuated; Day 19 | | 14th Day 19 |
| Maren Haugli; 26, Sandvika | North Team | South Team | | | 8th Voted Out; Day 19 | Left Competition; Day 20 | 13th Day 20 |
| Maria Voss; Returned to Game | North Team | | | | 5th Voted Out; Day 10 | 1st Returnee; Day 23 | |
| Rune André Olsen; 60, Harstad | North Team | North Team | North Team | Robinson | 10th Voted Out; Day 26 | Lost Duel; 1st Jury Member; Day 27 | 12th Day 27 |
| Norma Bris Bois; 42, Oslo | South Team | North Team | South Team | | 9th Voted Out; Day 22 | Lost Duel; 2nd Jury Member; Day 30 | 11th Day 30 |
| Daniel Gimnes; 34, Stjørdal | North Team | North Team | North Team | Robinson | 12th Voted Out; Day 32 | Lost Duel; 3rd Jury Member; Day 33 | 10th Day 33 |
| June Folkestad; 25, Mandal | South Team | North Team | | | 6th Voted Out; Day 13 | Lost Duel; 4th Jury Member; Day 37 | 9th Day 37 |
| Elisabeth Rivera Berland; 38, Stokke | North Team | North Team | North Team | Robinson | 13th Voted Out; Day 35 | Lost Duel; 6th Jury Member; Day 39 | 8th Day 39 |
| Susann Moen; 26, Hønefoss | North Team | North Team | North Team | Robinson | 11th Voted Out; Day 29 | Lost Duel; 5th Jury Member; Day 39 | 7th Day 39 |
| Liselotte Petersen; Returned to Game | South Team | South Team | South Team | Robinson | 14th Voted Out; Day 38 | 2nd Returnee; Day 39 | |
| Maria Voss; 42, Drammen | North Team | | | Robinson | 15th Voted Out; 7th Jury Member; Day 40 | | 6th Day 40 |
| Camilla Harner Smith; 52, Bærum | North Team | South Team | South Team | Robinson | 16th Voted Out; 8th Jury Member; Day 42 | | 5th Day 42 |
| Ferdinand Joppe Udness; 30, Trondheim | South Team | South Team | South Team | Robinson | Lost Challenge; 9th Jury Member; Day 42 | | 4th Day 42 |
| Andreas Carlsen; 32, Stongfjorden | South Team | North Team | South Team | Robinson | 2nd Runner-up; Day 42 | | 3rd Day 42 |
| Liselotte Petersen; 27, Øvre Eiker | South Team | South Team | South Team | Robinson | Runner-up; Day 42 | | 2nd Day 42 |
| Are Lundby Kvaal; 44, Tromsø | North Team | South Team | North Team | Robinson | Robinson; Day 42 | | 1st Day 42 |
