= Robinsonekspedisjonen 2016 =

- Season 15
- Presented by: Christer Falck
- No. of days: 40
- No. of castaways: 16
- Winner: Thomas Larsen
- Runner-up: Marte Ytre-Hauge
- Location: Caramoan, Philippines
- No. of episodes: 13

Release
- Original network: TV2
- Original release: 6 March – 29 May 2016

Season chronology
- ← Previous; 2015 Next → 2021

Robinsonekspedisjonen 2016 is the fifteenth season of the Norwegian reality television series Robinsonekspedisjonen. This season, 16 contestants from across Norway compete in challenges until one remains to be crowned this year's Robinson winner and the grand prize of NOK 300,000.

This was the second and final season to air on TV2 as after the season's finale, the show was cancelled by the network due to dwindling viewers. The season premiered on 6 March 2016 and concluded on 29 May 2016 where Thomas Larsen won against Marte Ytre-Hauge in a 4-3 jury vote.

== Finishing order ==
Contestant	Original Tribe	Merge Tribe	Finish
Marianne Bergsetj; 32, Drammen	North Team		1st Voted Out; Day 4
Vibeke Mathisen; 44, Svanvik	South Team		2nd Voted Out; Day 6
Caroline Rasdal Kemi; 20, Kautokeino	South Team		3rd Voted Out; Day 9
Habibi Ayoub; 30, Stavanger	North Team		4th Voted Out; Day 13
Tone Vogt Presthagen; 56, Son	North Team		5th Voted Out; Day 16
Melissa Bertelsen; 26, Vennesla	North Team		6th Voted Out; Day 19
Pål Tychesen; 50, Sandefjord	North Team	Robinson	7th Voted Out; Day 22
Erik Fjeldstad; 24, Stange	South Team	Robinson	Medically evacuated 1st jury member Day 25
Anya Bjerke; 25, Horten	North Team	Robinson	8th Voted Out; 2nd jury member Day 28
Flemming Rehtmar Jr. 38, Levanger	South Team	Robinson	9th Voted Out; 3rd jury member Day 31
Alexander Skorpen; 27, Os	North Team	Robinson	10th Voted Out; 4th jury member Day 34
Alex Ek; 34, Fredrikstad	South Team	Robinson	11th Voted Out; 5th jury member Day 37
Espen Hammersvik; 33, Måløy	North Team	Robinson	Lost Challenge; 6th jury member Day 39
Caroline Haga; 24, Oslo	South Team	Robinson	Lost Challenge; 7th jury member Day 39
Marte Ytre-Hauge; 21, Skien	South Team	Robinson	Runner-up; Day 40
Thomas Larsen; 24, Stavanger	South Team	Robinson	Robinson; Day 40
