= Robinsonekspedisjonen Vinter (2012) =

Season of television series

- Presented by: Christer Falck
- No. of castaways: 17
- Winner: Elisabeth Nielsen
- Runner-up: Ørjan Danielsen
- Location: Rauland, Norway
- No. of episodes: 10

Release
- Original network: TV3
- Original release: March 11, 2012 – June 2012

Season chronology
- ← Previous; 2011 Next → 2013

Robinsonekspedisjonen Vinter is the twelfth season of the Norwegian version of the Swedish show Expedition Robinson and the first season of Robinsonekspedisjonen to take place in a cold climate. This season premiered on March 11, 2012 and finished in June. The main twist this season is that the contestants lived in the cold climate of Raulandsgrend, Norway.

In episode 6 Lucas called his girlfriend (Nora Lindvåg Johre), a paradise hotel reality star, and lost his immunity, as he broke the rule of communicating with the outside world, when he used a cellphone.

== Finishing order ==
| Contestant | Original Tribe | Tribal Swap | Merged Tribe | Finish |
|---|---|---|---|---|
| Merete Fjellstad; 41, Husnes | South Team | | | 1st Voted Out; Day 3 |
| Merete Palm; 50, Stabekk | North Team | North Team | | 2nd Voted Out; Day 6 |
| Cecilie Nøstvik Larsen; 26, Sørreisa | South Team | South Team | | Evacuated; Day 6 |
| Charlotte Thorbjørnsen; 20, Bergen | North Team | North Team | | 3rd Voted Out; Day 9 |
| Simen Aronsen; 26, Oslo | North Team | North Team | | 4th Voted Out; Day 12 |
| Elisabeth Nielsen; Returned to game | North Team | North Team | | 5th Voted Out; Day 15 |
| Liss-Mari Larsen; 45, Finnsnes | South Team | South Team | | Evacuated; Day 16 |
| Edwin Ortiz; 24, Bjorbekk | North Team | North Team | | Not Picked to Duel; Day 18 |
| Robert Smith; 24, Oslo | South Team | South Team | | Not Picked to Duel; Day 18 |
| Lasse Østervold; 45, Oslo | | South Team | | Lost Duel; Day 19 |
| Ørjan Danielsen; Returned to game | South Team | North Team | Robinson | 6th Voted Out; Day 20 |
| Renate Strøm; 21, Stavanger | North Team | North Team | Robinson | Evacuated; 1st Jury Member; Day 22 |
| Lucas Andersen; 21, Bodø | North Team | North Team | Robinson | 7th Voted Out; 2nd Jury Member; Day 23 |
| Marthe Broby Follaug; 21, Skien | South Team | South Team | Robinson | 8th Voted Out; 3rd Jury Member; Day 26 |
| Jan-Kåre Heiberg; 30, Gjøvik | North Team | South Team | Robinson | 9th Voted Out; 4th Jury Member; Day 30 |
| Geir Berland; 41, Bergen | South Team | South Team | Robinson | Lost Challenge; 5th Jury Member; Day ? |
| Erik Nilsen; 51, Bergen | South Team | South Team | Robinson | Lost Challenge; 6th Jury Member; Day ? |
| Ørjan Danielsen; 22, Oslo | South Team | North Team | Robinson | Runner-Up; Day ? |
| Elisabeth Nielsen; 38, Trondheim | North Team | North Team | Robinson | Sole Survivor; Day ? |

== The game ==
| First air date | Challenges | | Eliminated | Vote | Finish |
| First air date | Reward | Immunity | Eliminated | Vote | Finish |
|---|---|---|---|---|---|
| March 11, 2012 | North Team | North Team | Merete F. | 7-1 | 1st Voted Out; Day 3 |
| March 18, 2012 | North Team | South Team | Merete P. | 6-1-1 | 2nd Voted Out; Day 6 |
| March 25, 2012 | North Team | South Team | Cecilie | No Vote | Evacuated; Day 6 |
| March 25, 2012 | North Team | South Team | Charlotte | 4-2-1 | 3rd Voted Out; Day 9 |
| April 1, 2012 | North Team | South Team | Simen | 5-1 | 4th Voted Out; Day 12 |
| April 15, 2012 | South Team | South Team | Elisabeth | 3-2 | 5th Voted Out; Day 15 |
| April 15, 2012 | Elisabeth^{1} | Ørjan^{2} | Elisabeth | 3-2 | 5th Voted Out; Day 15 |
| April 22, 2012 | None | None | Liss-Mari | No Vote | Evacuated; Day 16 |
| April 22, 2012 | None | ~~Lucas~~^{4} | Edwin^{3} | No Vote | Not Picked to Duel; Day 18 |
| April 22, 2012 | None | ~~Lucas~~^{4} | Robert^{3} | No Vote | Not Picked to Duel; Day 18 |
| April 22, 2012 | None | Erik^{3} | Lasse^{3} | No Vote | Lost Duel; Day 19 |
| April 22, 2012 | None | Jan-Kåre | Ørjan^{4} | 6-1-1 | 6th Voted Out; 1st Jury Member; Day 20 |
| April 29, 2012 | Lucas | Jan-Kåre | Renate | No Vote | Evacuated; Day 22 |
| April 29, 2012 | Lucas | Jan-Kåre | Lucas | 4-2-1 | 7th Voted Out; 2nd Jury Member; Day 23 |
| May 6, 2012 | ~~Jan-Kåre~~ (Erik) | Geir | Marthe | 4-1-1 | 8th Voted Out; 3rd Jury Member; Day 26 |
| May 13, 2012 | Ørjan | Ørjan | Jan-Kåre | 3-2 | 9th Voted Out; 4th Jury Member; Day 30 |
| May 20, 2012 | None | Elisabeth | Geir; Erik | No Vote | Lost Challenge; 5th Jury Member; Day ? |
| May 20, 2012 | None | Ørjan | Geir; Erik | No Vote | Lost Challenge; 6th Jury Member; Day ? |
| May 20, 2012 | None | None | Ørjan | 6-0 | Runner-Up |
| May 20, 2012 | None | None | Elisabeth | 6-0 | Sole Survivor |

^Note 1:Following their victory at the fifth reward challenge, the South team was allowed to choose one person that would join them on their reward.
^Note 2:At the fifth tribal immunity challenge two idols were placed in the center of the challenge area. The player from the losing tribe that grabbed their idol first would be immune at the fifth tribal council.
^Note 3:Prior to the merge in episode 6, both tribes were asked to choose one person that would not make the merge. The North team chose Lucas while the South picked Lasse. The two men were then asked to pick one other person from their tribe that would also fall short of the merge. Ultimately, Lucas picked Edwin while Lasse picked Robert. The four men were then forced to pick one of them that would take part in a duel against someone from the merge tribe, someone who would automatically join the merge tribe and have immunity at the first tribal council, and two people that would be eliminated regardless of the duel's outcome. Lucas was picked to join the Robinson tribe, Lasse was picked to duel, and Edwin and Robert were picked to be eliminated. Lasse then chose Erik to face him in the duel.
^Note 4:At the sixth tribal council, Lucas lost his immunity as he broke the rule of communicating with the outside world when he used a cellphone to make a personal call.

== Voting History ==
| | Original Tribes | Tribal Swap | | | | | | | Merge Tribe | | | | | | | | |
|---|---|---|---|---|---|---|---|---|---|---|---|---|---|---|---|---|---|
| Episode #: | 1 | 2 | 3 | | 4 | 5 | 6 | | | 7 | | 8 | 9 | 10 | | | |
| Eliminated: | Merete F. 7/8 votes | Merete P. 6/8 votes | Cecilie; No vote | Charlotte; 4/7 votes | Simen; 5/6 votes | Elisabeth; 3/5 votes^{1} | Liss-Mari; No vote | Edwin, Robert, Lasse; No vote^{2} | Ørjan; 6/8 votes^{3} | Renate; No vote | Lucas; 4/7 votes | Marthe; 4/6 votes | Jan-Kåre; 3/5 votes | Geir; Erik; No vote | | Ørjan; 0/6 votes | Elisabeth; 6/6 votes |
| Voter | Vote | | | | | | | | | | | | | | | | |
| Elisabeth | | Merete P. | | Edwin | Simen | Lucas | Returns | | Ørjan | | ? | Marthe | Jan-Kåre | Won | | Jury Vote | |
| Ørjan | Merete F. | Merete P. | | Charlotte | Simen | Elisabeth | | | Lucas | Returns | ? | Marthe | Jan-Kåre | | Won | Jury Vote | |
| Erik | Merete F. | | | | | | | Won | Ørjan | | Ørjan | Marthe | Elisabeth | | Lost | | Elisabeth |
| Geir | Merete F. | | | | | | | | Ørjan | | Lucas | Jan-Kåre | Jan-Kåre | | Lost | | Elisabeth |
| Jan-Kåre | | | | | | | | | Ørjan | | ? | Marthe | Elisabeth | | | | Elisabeth |
| Marthe | Merete F. | | | | | | | | Ørjan | | ? | Ørjan | | | | | Elisabeth |
| Lucas | | Merete P. | | Charlotte | Simen | Elisabeth | | | Ørjan | | ? | | | | | | Elisabeth |
| Renate | | Merete P. | | Charlotte | Simen | Elisabeth | | | Elisabeth | | | | | | | | Elisabeth |
| Lasse | Not in game | | | | | | | Lost | | | | | | | | | |
| Edwin | | Merete P. | | Charlotte | Simen | Lucas | | | | | | | | | | | |
| Robert | Merete F. | | | | | | | | | | | | | | | | |
| Liss-Mari | Merete F. | | | | | | | | | | | | | | | | |
| Simen | | Renate | | Renate | Lucas | | | | | | | | | | | | |
| Charlotte | | Merete P. | | Renate | | | | | | | | | | | | | |
| Cecilie | Merete F. | | | | | | | | | | | | | | | | |
| Merete P. | | Lucas | | | | | | | | | | | | | | | |
| Merete F. | Robert | | | | | | | | | | | | | | | | |

^1 As he had grabbed his tribes immunity idol at the fifth immunity challenge, Ørjan was immune at the fifth tribal council.
^2 Prior to the merge in episode 6, both tribes were asked to choose one person that would not make the merge. The North team chose Lucas while the South picked Lasse. The two men were then asked to pick one other person from their tribe that would also fall short of the merge. Ultimately, Lucas picked Edwin while Lasse picked Robert. The four men were then forced to pick one of them that would take part in a duel against someone from the merge tribe, someone who would automatically join the merge tribe and have immunity at the first tribal council, and two people that would be eliminated regardless of the duel's outcome. Lucas was picked to join the Robinson tribe, Lasse was picked to duel, and Edwin and Robert were picked to be eliminated. Lasse then chose Erik to face him in the duel.
^3 At the sixth tribal council, Lucas lost his immunity as he broke the rule of communicating with the outside world when he used a cellphone to make a personal call.
