= Robinsonekspedisjonen 2015 =

- Season 2015
- Presented by: Christer Falck
- No. of days: 39
- No. of castaways: 18
- Winner: Maiken Sæther Olsen
- Runner-up: Julian David Gursky
- Location: Caramoan, Philippines
- No. of episodes: 13

Release
- Original network: TV2
- Original release: 8 February – 10 May 2015

Additional information
- Filming dates: 11 May – 18 June 2014

Season chronology
- ← Previous; 2013 Next → 2016

Robinsonekspedisjonen 2015 is the fourteenth season of the Norwegian version of the Swedish show Expedition Robinson. This season premiered on February 8, 2015 and concluded on May 10, 2015.

== Season summary ==
This season marked a change for the program's channel. For the first time since the series debut Robinsonekspedisjonen was not aired on TV3, but rather on rival channel TV2. This season was filmed prior to TV2's acquisition of Robinson's broadcasting rights. In addition to this, as an added twist a set of twins, Vita and Wanda Mashadi, entered the game together. Also, Rolf Florida Kristensen is the brother of 2010 winner Alita Dagmar Kristensen. This season premiered with an average of over 480,000 viewers with a peak of 537,000 viewers in its second hour. This is the single highest viewership for the program in its sixteen-year history. In episode three, Vita and Wanda left the secret island they'd been living on since the game's start and were each added to one of the two tribes.

== Finishing order ==
Contestant	Original Tribe	Tribal Swap	Merge Tribe	Finish
Kristine Celeste Myhrehagen; 33, Bærum	Himbuyan			1st Voted Out; Day 3
Erik Massimo Herstadhagen; 32, Elverum	Matalahod			Left Competition; Day 6
Sara Frostadottir Sigmundsen; 37, Bryne	Matalahod			2nd Voted Out; Day 6
Anders Dahle; 21, Fredrikstad	Himbuyan			3rd Voted Out; Day 9
Anne Sofie Kvistnes; 38, Kristiansund	Matalahod	Himbuyan		4th Voted Out; Day 12
Jeanette Emberland; 24, Haugesund	Himbuyan	Matalahod		5th Voted Out; Day 15
Stig Arild Rønningen; 45, Drammen	Himbuyan	Himbuyan		Lost Challenge; Day 16
Nicklas Olsen Hovland; 22, Stavanger	Matalahod	Matalahod	Catanhawan	6th Voted Out; 1st Jury Member; Day 18
Tore Kalland; 43, Bodø	Matalahod	Matalahod	Catanhawan	7th Voted Out; 2nd Jury Member; Day 21
Helena Holthe; 25, Trondheim	Matalahod	Matalahod	Catanhawan	8th Voted Out; 3rd Jury Member; Day 24
Wanda Mashadi; 22, Strømmen	Himbuyan	Himbuyan	Catanhawan	9th Voted Out; 4th Jury Member; Day 27
Lars Helge Brettingen; 40, Askim	Matalahod	Matalahod	Catanhawan	10th Voted Out; 5th Jury Member; Day 30
Vita Mashadi; 22, Strømmen	Matalahod	Himbuyan	Catanhawan	11th Voted Out; 6th Jury Member; Day 33
Lise Lotte Håndstad; 23, Tromsø	Himbuyan	Matalahod	Catanhawan	12th Voted Out; 7th Jury Member; Day 36
Monica dos Santos; 39, Arendal	Matalahod	Himbuyan	Catanhawan	Lost Challenge; 8th Jury Member; Day 37
Rolf Florida Kristensen; 32, Alta	Himbuyan	Himbuyan	Catanhawan	Lost Challenge; 9th Jury Member; Day 38
Julian David Gursky; 30, Munich, Germany	Himbuyan	Himbuyan	Catanhawan	Runner-up; Day 39
Maiken Sæther Olsen; 21, Harstad	Himbuyan	Matalahod	Catanhawan	Sole Survivor; Day 39

== The game ==
First air date	Challenges		Eliminated	Vote	Finish
First air date	Reward	Immunity	Eliminated	Vote	Finish
February 8, 2015	Helena; Julian	Matalahod	Kristine	7-1	1st Voted Out; Day 3
February 8, 2015	Helena; Julian	Julian^{1}	Kristine	7-1	1st Voted Out; Day 3
February 15, 2015	Matalahod	Himbuyan	Mossimo	No Vote	Left Competition; Day ?
February 15, 2015	Matalahod	Helena^{2}	Sara	?-?	2nd Voted Out; Day ?
February 22, 2015	Matalahod	Matalahod	Anders	?-?	3rd Voted Out; Day ?
March 1, 2015	None	Matalahod	Fia	9-1	4th Voted Out; Day ?
March 8, 2015	Matalahod	Himbuyan	Jeanette	?-?	5th Voted Out; Day ?
March 15, 2015	None	Nicklas (Tore)	Stig	No Vote	Lost Challenge; Day ?
March 15, 2015	None	Nicklas (Tore)	Nicklas	?-?	6th Voted Out; Day ?

== Voting history ==
	Original Tribes	
Episode #:	1	2
Eliminated:	Kristine; 7/8 votes^{1}	
Voter	Vote	
Anders	Kristine	
Anne		
Helena		
Jeanette	Kristine	
Julian	Kristine	
Lars		
Lise Lotte	Kristine	
Maiken	Kristine	
Monica		
Massimo		
Nicklas		
Rolf	Kristine	
Sara		
Stig	Kristine	
Tore		
Vita	Not in game	
Wanda	Not in game	
Kristine	?	

^1 During the first challenge of the season Helena and Julian won immunity via finding immunity idols on the island.
