= Robinsonekspedisjonen 2000 =

- Season 2
- Presented by: Christer Falck
- No. of days: 47
- No. of castaways: 17
- Winner: Therese Andersen
- Runner-up: Ihne Vagmo
- Location: Tengah Island, Malaysia
- No. of episodes: 13

Release
- Original network: TV3
- Original release: 10 September – 3 December 2000

Season chronology
- ← Previous; 1999 Next → 2001

Robinsonekspedisjonen: 2000 is the second season of Robinsonekspedisjonen, the Norwegian version of the Swedish show Expedition Robinson. It aired from 10 September to 3 December 2000. Christer Falck was the host for the second season of Robinsonekspedisjonen, and would continue to host the programme until 2016.

Therese Andersen won the 2000 season over Ihne Vagmo by an unknown margin in the secret ballot, becoming the first female to win the Norwegian version. The ratings for the second season were much better than those of the first.

== Finishing order ==
Contestant	Original Tribe	Episode 3 Tribe	Merged Tribe	Finish
Barry Kefi; 54, Bærum	South Team			1st Voted Out; Day 4
Linda Strømsod; 25, Oslo	South Team			2nd Voted Out; Day 7
Erik Skar; Returned to the game	South Team	South Team		3rd Voted Out; Day 10
Eivind Aune; 29, Oslo	South Team	South Team		4th Voted Out; Day 14
Nils Nilsen; 31, Kristiansand	North Team	North Team		5th Voted Out; Day 18
Andreas Bjørge; 37, Namsos	South Team	North Team		6th Voted Out; Day 21
Erik Skar; 29, Oslo	South Team	South Team	Robinson	7th Voted Out; 1st Jury Member; Day 26
Nina Grenness; 38, Øyer	North Team	North Team	Robinson	8th Voted Out; 2nd Jury Member; Day 29
Linda Vibeto; 24, Tønsberg	North Team	North Team	Robinson	9th Voted Out; 3rd Jury Member; Lost Duel; Day 34
Truls Pedersen; 24, Hamar	North Team	South Team	Robinson	10th Voted Out; 4th Jury Member; Day 37
Ely-Ann "Tulla" Olsen; 46, Oslo	South Team	South Team	Robinson	Left Competition; 5th Jury Member; Day 40
Walter Brandsegg; 49, Oppdal	North Team	North Team	Robinson	11th Voted Out; 6th Jury Member; Day 41
Marthe Halvorsen; 24, Bergen	South Team	South Team	Robinson	12th Voted Out; 7th Jury Member; Day 44
Karl 'Emil' Salmila; 25, Oslo	North Team	North Team	Robinson	Lost Challenge; 8th Jury Member; Day 46
Line Gløersen; 34, Stavanger	North Team	North Team	Robinson	Lost Challenge; 9th Jury Member; Day 46
Ihne Vagmo; 28, Oslo	South Team	South Team	Robinson	Runner-Up; Day 47
Therese Andersen; 21, Helgeroa	North Team	North Team	Robinson	Sole Survivor; Day 47
