= Robinsonekspedisjonen 2002 =

- Season 4
- Presented by: Christer Falck
- No. of days: 47
- No. of castaways: 18
- Winner: Ann Karene Molvig
- Runner-up: Halvard Gjerdebakken
- Location: Malaysia
- No. of episodes: 14

Release
- Original network: TV3
- Original release: 22 September – 25 December 2002

Season chronology
- ← Previous; 2001 Next → 2003

Robinsonekspedisjonen: 2002, was the fourth season of the Norwegian version of the Swedish show Expedition Robinson and it premiered on 22 September 2002 and aired until 15 December 2002.

== Season summary ==
The fourth season took place on an island in Malaysia. For the fourth season the amount of contestants was raised from sixteen to eighteen. The first twist this season took place in episode one when both tribes were forced to vote out one member prior to their first immunity challenge. As another twist this season when a contestant was voted out they were sent to "destiny island". Ann Molvig eventually won the final duel and returned to the game. Once on the island the ousted contestant would compete in a series of duels with other eliminated players in order to gain a spot in the final five. Ultimately, it was Ann Molvig who won the season over Halvard Fence with an initial jury vote of 5-5, and eventually a 6-4 vote when Bjørn Jarli changed his vote.

== Finishing order ==
Contestant	Original Tribes	Episode 3 Tribes	Episode 5 Tribes	Merged Tribe	Finish
Ane Elise Tunstad; 22, Tårnåsen	North Team				1st Voted Out; Day ?
Magnus Larsen; 30, Oslo	South Team				1st Voted Out; Day ?
Cathrine Sandli; 28, Oslo	North Team				2nd Voted Out; Day ? Lost Duel; Day ?
Sandra Bekkelund; 27, Gjerdrum	South Team				3rd Voted Out; Day ? Refused Duel; Day ?
Bjørn Schei; 59, Oslo	North Team	North Team			5th Voted Out; Day ? Lost Duel; Day ?
Mathis Jenssen; 25, Haugesund	South Team	South Team	South Team		6th Voted Out; Day ? Lost Duel; Day ?
Even Mjøen; 24, Oslo	South Team	South Team	South Team		7th Voted Out; Day ? Lost Duel; Day ?
Kjetil Wang; 25, Oslo	South Team	South Team	South Team	Robinson	8th Voted Out; Day ? Lost Duel; 1st Jury Member; Day ?
Lill Hege Furulund; 28, Oslo	South Team	South Team		Robinson	4th Voted Out; Day ? Lost Duel; 2nd Jury Member; Day ?
Gina Celso; 24, Oslo	South Team	South Team	South Team	Robinson	9th Voted Out; Day ? Lost Duel; 3rd Jury Member; Day ?
Jo Nguyen; 25, Oslo	North Team	South Team	South Team	Robinson	10th Voted Out; Day ? Lost Duel; 4th Jury Member; Day ?
Mona Eilertsen; 37, Saupstad	North Team	North Team	North Team	Robinson	11th Voted Out; Day ? Lost Duel; 5th Jury Member; Day ?
Bjørn André Jarli; 34, Oslo	North Team	North Team	North Team	Robinson	12th Voted Out; Day ? Lost Duel; 6th Jury Member; Day ?
Ann-Mari Mathiassen; 25, Mysen	South Team	South Team	South Team	Robinson	13th Voted Out; Day ? Lost Duel; 7th Jury Member; Day ?
Ann Karene Molvig; Returned to game	North Team	North Team	North Team	Robinson	14th Voted Out; Day ?
Roger Altræk; 36, Bergen	South Team	South Team	North Team	Robinson	Lost Challenge; 8th Jury Member; Day ?
Hilde Baugstø; 23, Oslo	North Team	North Team	North Team	Robinson	Lost Challenge; 9th Jury Member; Day ?
Halvard Gjerdebakken; 25, Bergen	North Team	North Team	North Team	Robinson	Runner-Up; Day 47
Ann Karene Molvig; 25, Moss	North Team	North Team	North Team	Robinson	Won Duel; Day ? Sole Survivor; Day 47

== Voting history ==
	Original Tribes						Mixed Tribes		Merged Tribe										
Episode #:	1			2	3	4	5	6	7	8	9	10	11	12		13		Reunion	
Eliminated:	Ane; 1/1 vote	Magnus; 1/1 vote	Cathrine ?/8 votes	Sandra ?/8 votes^{1}	Lill; 5/8 votes^{1}	Bjørn S 4/6 votes	Mathis; 4/6 vote	Even; 3/5 votes	Kjetil; 7/10 votes	Gina ?/9 vote	Jo ?/8 votes	Mona; 6/7 votes	Bjørn J 6/9 votes	Ann-Mari; 1/1 vote	Ann; 3/4 votes	Ann-Mari; Bjørn J No vote	Roger; Hilde; No vote	Halvard; 4/10 votes^{2}	Ann; 6/10 votes^{2}
Voter	Vote																		
Ann	Ane		?			Bjørn S			Kjetil	Gina	Jo	Mona	Bjørn J		?	On FI		Jury Vote	
Halvard			?			Bjørn S			Kjetil	Gina	Jo	Mona	Ann	Ann-Mari	Ann			Jury Vote	
Hilde			?			Bjørn S			Kjetil	Gina	Jo	Mona	Ann		Ann				
Roger				?	Lill				Kjetil	Gina	Jo	Mona	Bjørn J		Ann				
Ann-Mari				?	Even		?	Kjetil	Kjetil	?	?	Mona	Bjørn J		On FI				
Bjørn J			?			Bjørn S			Kjetil	Gina	Jo	Mona	Ann	On FI					
Mona			?			Bjørn S			Kjetil	Gina	Jo	Ann-Mari	On FI						
Jo			?		Lill		Mathis	Even	Ann	Ann	Bjørn J	On FI							
Gina				?	Lill		Mathis	Even	Ann	Ann	On FI								
Lill				?	Even	On Fate Island													
Kjetil				?	Lill		Mathis	Even	Ann	On FI									
Even				?	Lill		Mathis	?	On FI										
Mathis				?	Even		Kjetil	On FI											
Bjørn S			?			Hilde	On FI												
Sandra				?															
Cathrine			Ann	On FI															
Magnus		Magnus																	
Ane																			
