= Robinsonekspedisjonen 2001 =

- Season 3
- Presented by: Christer Falck
- No. of days: 46
- No. of castaways: 17
- Winner: Mia Martinsen
- Runner-up: Trude Helen Hole
- Location: Malaysia
- No. of episodes: 13

Release
- Original network: TV3
- Original release: 9 September – 2 December 2001

Season chronology
- ← Previous; 2000 Next → 2002

Robinsonekspedisjonen: 2001 is the third season of the Norwegian version of the Swedish show Expedition Robinson. It premiered on 9 September 2001 and aired until 2 December 2001.

== Season summary ==
The third season took place on an island in Malaysia. In episode five of this season, the first twist took place which was a tribal swap took place. Along with this twist starting in episode five the tribe that won immunity voted out a member of the losing tribe. When the merge came so did the season's joker, Annbjørg Østerås who along with Conny Hansen and Erik Torjusen moved to a new, merge camp in episode 6.

For the first time in the history of Expedition Robinson, there was a final three instead of a final two and for the first time in the Norwegian version of the show the public were allowed to award a jury vote to the finalist of their choice. Ultimately, Mia Martinsen won the season with a jury vote of 4-3-2 over Trude Hole and Anders Dahle.

== Finishing order ==
Contestant	Original Tribes	Episode 3 Tribes	Merged Tribe	Finish
Anita Holstad; 27, Sandnes	South Team			1st Voted Out; Day 3
Hege Stuen; 35, Oslo	North Team			2nd Voted Out; Day 7
Laila Brantenberg; 30, Oslo	North Team	North Team		3rd Voted Out; Day 10
Evy-Marie Rygh; 20, Frosta	North Team	North Team		4th Voted Out; Day 13
Kristin Tolderlund; 28, Borgenhaugen	South Team	South Team		5th Voted Out; Day 17
Jacob Stepaschko; 26, Oslo	North Team	North Team		6th Voted Out; Day 20
Erik Torjusen; 38, Oslo	South Team	North Team	Robinson	7th Voted Out; 1st Jury Member; Day 24
Jon-Terje Lepsøy; 35, Bergen	South Team	South Team	Robinson	8th Voted Out; 2nd Jury Member; Day 27
Conny Hansen; 44, Surnadal	South Team	South Team	Robinson	9th Voted Out; Lost Duel; 3rd Jury Member; Day 32
Elin Lien; 27, Jaren	South Team	South Team	Robinson	10th Voted Out; 4th Jury Member; Day 35
Annbjørg Østerås; 33, Oslo			Robinson	Left Competition; 5th Jury Member; Day 37
Gert Eilerås; 28, Etne	North Team	North Team	Robinson	11th Voted Out; 6th Jury Member; Day 39
Haavard Mørk; 43, Oslo	South Team	South Team	Robinson	12th Voted Out; 7th Jury Member; Day 43
Per-Morten Aaserud; 24, Jessheim	North Team	South Team	Robinson	Lost Challenge; 8th Jury Member; Day 45
Anders Dahle; 34, Oslo	North Team	North Team	Robinson	2nd-Runner-Up; Day 46
Trude Helen Hole; 32, Asker	South Team	South Team	Robinson	Runner-Up; Day 46
Mia Martinsen; 23, Tromsø	North Team	North Team	Robinson	Sole Survivor; Day 46
