= Robinsonekspedisjonen 1999 =

- Season 1
- Presented by: Nils Ole Oftebro
- No. of days: 42
- No. of castaways: 16
- Winner: Christer Falck
- Runner-up: Hanne Akre
- Location: Cadlao, Philippines
- No. of episodes: 13

Release
- Original network: TV3
- Original release: 19 September – 5 December 1999

Season chronology
- Next → 2000

Robinsonekspedisjonen: 1999 is the first season of the Norwegian version of the Swedish show Expedition Robinson. It premiered on 19 September 1999 and aired until 5 December 199. The first season took place on the island of Cadlao, outside of the Philippines, and was hosted by Nils Ole Oftebro.

== Season summary ==
Keeping with the tradition of the Swedish version, the two tribes were simply named "Lag Nord" (North Team) and "Lag Sør" (South Team). Ultimately, Christer Falch won the season over Hanne Cecilie Akre by a unanimous jury vote of 8-0.

As Christer was seen as the mastermind of the dominant alliance this season, and was also seen as the best player, he would take over as host of the show from season 2 onwards. Unlike Expedition Robinson, the Norwegian version of the show did not meet the expectations of TV3; however, it was renewed for several more seasons.

== Finishing order ==
Contestant	Original Tribe	Merged Tribe	Finish
Gunnar Myhr; 42, Bærum	South Team		1st Voted Out; Day 4
Tore Jørgensen; 53, Nesbru	North Team		2nd Voted Out; Day 6
Kari Devik; 49, Bergen	South Team		3rd Voted Out; Day 9
Mette Ulvestad; 35, Vikebukt	North Team		4th Voted Out; Day 13
Ingunn Brønstad; 31, Oslo	North Team		5th Voted Out; Day 16
Mette Iversen; 29, Oslo	South Team		6th Voted Out; Day 19
Kathrin Bjørnstad; 31, Oslo	North Team	Robinson	7th Voted Out; 1st Jury Member; Day 26
Tore Hongset; 34, Bodø	South Team	Robinson	8th Voted Out; 2nd Jury Member; Day 29
Ole Sivertsen; 28, Åfjord	North Team	Robinson	9th Voted Out; 3rd Jury Member; Day 33
Elisa Røtterud; 20, Oslo	South Team	Robinson	10th Voted Out; 4th Jury Member; Day 36
John Olav Vinge; 36, Agdenes	North Team	Robinson	11th Voted Out; 5th Jury Member; Day 38
Bjørn "Poppe" Thorsen; 27, Hundvåg	South Team	Robinson	12th Voted Out; 6th Jury Member; Day 39
Erik Espeseth; 32, Ålesund	North Team	Robinson	Lost Challenge; 7th Jury Member; Day 40
Ann-Iren Utne; 34, Skien	South Team	Robinson	Lost Challenge; 8th Jury Member; Day 41
Hanne Akre; 34, Oslo	North Team	Robinson	Runner-Up; Day 42
Christer Falck; 30, Oslo	South Team	Robinson	Sole Survivor; Day 42

== Voting history ==
	Original Tribes						Merged Tribe									
Episode #:	1	2	3	4	5	6	8	9	10	11	12		13			
Eliminated:	Gunnar; 6/8 votes	Tore J 4/8 votes	Kari; 6/7 votes	Mette U 4/7 votes	Ingunn; 3/6 votes	Mette I 3/6 votes	Kathrin; 8/10 votes	Tore H 5/9 votes	Ole; 5/8 votes	Elisa; 5/7 votes	John Olav; 5/6 votes	Poppe; 4/5 votes	Erik; 1/1 vote	Ann-Iren; 1/1 vote	Hanne; 0/8 votes	Christer; 8/8 votes
Voter	Vote															
Christer	Gunnar		Kari			Mette I	Kathrin	Tore H	Ole	Elisa	John Olav	Poppe	Erik		Jury Vote	
Hanne		Tore J		Mette U	Ingunn		Kathrin	Tore H	Ole	Elisa	John Olav	Poppe		Ann-Iren	Jury Vote	
Ann-Iren	Gunnar		Kari			Mette I	Kathrin	Tore H	Ole	Elisa	John Olav	Poppe				Christer
Erik		Tore J?		Mette U	Kathrin		Kathrin	Elisa	Ole	Elisa	John Olav	Poppe				Christer
Poppe	Gunnar		Kari			Mette I	Kathrin	Tore H	Ole	Elisa	John Olav	Hanne				Christer
John Olav		Hanne?		Ingunn	Ingunn		Kathrin	Christer	Erik	Erik	Erik					Christer
Elisa	Gunnar		Kari			Poppe	Kathrin	Tore H	Erik	Hanne						Christer
Ole		Hanne?		Ingunn	Ingunn		Kathrin	Christer	Erik							Christer
Tore H	Kari		Kari			Elisa	Christer	Christer								Christer
Kathrin		Tore J		Mette U	John Olav		Christer									Christer
Mette I	Gunnar		Kari			Poppe										
Ingunn		Tore J?		Mette U	John Olav											
Mette U		Ingunn		Ingunn												
Kari	Gunnar		Elisa													
Tore J		Hanne														
Gunnar	Kari															
