= Robinsonekspedisjonen 2004 =

- Season 6
- Presented by: Christer Falck
- No. of days: 47
- No. of castaways: 20
- Winner: Jan Stian Gundersen
- Runner-up: Anne Sivertsen
- Location: Malaysia

Release
- Original network: TV3
- Original release: 5 September – 4 December 2004

Season chronology
- ← Previous; 2003 Next → 2005 (VIP)

Robinsonekspedisjonen: 2004 is the sixth season of the Norwegian version of the Swedish show Expedition Robinson. It premiered on 5 September 2004 and aired until 4 December 2004.

== Season summary ==
The sixth season started with the contestants having to race from off shore to a beach and into a cage with the last person to reach the cage being eliminated. Contestants were then told that they had to stay in the cage until one of them, who would be eliminated, left the cage. These two and all subsequent eliminated contestants were sent to a place called 'Utopia', where they would compete in a duel in order to earn a place in the final four. After the cage challenge the contestants were split into two tribes of nine.

In episode five there was a huge tribal swap in which five of the fifteen remaining contestants swapped tribes. Those who swapped tribes were given immunity at their new tribes first tribal council.

In episode six Rebecca, the person the South team they had just voted out, was able to select someone to be eliminated in her place. She chose Tom 'Piippo' Piippo.

In episode thirteen the remaining members of the merge tribe were put in pairs and told that they would vote and be eliminated in a pair at the next tribal council.

When it came time for the final four, all the eliminated contestants faced off in Utopia. Anne Sivertsen won the duel and was allowed to return to the competition.

Jan Gundersen won the season with an unknown jury vote over Anne Sivertsen.

== Finishing order ==
Contestant	Original Tribes	Episode 5 Tribes	Merged Tribe	Finish
Linda Sørensen; 24, Fredrikstad	None			Last to the Cage; Day 1 Lost Duel; Day ?
Gro Solbakken; Lier	None			First to leave the Cage; Day 1 Lost Duel; Day ?
Ole Kristian Løken; 39, Narvik	North Team			1st Voted Out; Day 3 Lost Duel; Day ?
Hebe Elisabeth Lohne-Knudsen; 30, Oslo	North Team			2nd Voted Out; Day 6 Lost Duel; Day ?
Catherine Nesvik; 22, Stavanger	South Team			3rd Voted Out; Day 9 Lost Duel; Day ?
Anne Sivertsen; Returned to the game	South Team	South Team		4th Voted Out; Day 12
Tom Roger Piippo; 32, Oslo	South Team	South Team		Eliminated; Day 15; Lost Duel; Day ?
Ann-Karin Olavsrud; 44, Oslo	North Team	South Team		5th Voted Out; Day 18; Lost Duel; Day ?
Pål Håndlykken; 30, Skien	South Team	South Team		6th Voted Out; Day 21; Lost Duel; Day ?
Rebecca Wolsdal; 37, Oslo	North Team	South Team		7th Voted Out; Day 24; Lost Duel; Day ?
Kenneth Paulsen; 35,	North Team	South Team	Robinson	8th Voted Out; Day 27; Lost Duel; Day ? 1st Jury Member
Vegard Hesthagen; 24, Trondheim	North Team	South Team	Robinson	9th Voted Out; Day 30; Lost Duel; Day ? 2nd Jury Member
Lene Alexandra Øien; 23, Trøgstad	North Team	North Team	Robinson	10th Voted Out; Day 33; Lost Duel; Day ? 3rd Jury Member
Camilla Høgtoft; 26, Sandefjord	South Team	North Team	Robinson	11th/12th Voted Out; Day 36; Lost Duel; Day ? 4th/5th Jury Member
Torkel Aune Sondresen; 27, Oslo	South Team	North Team	Robinson	11th/12th Voted Out; Day 36; Lost Duel; Day ? 4th/5th Jury Member
Bjørn-Thomas Stenersen; 28, Drammen	South Team	South Team	Robinson	13th Voted Out; Day 39; Lost Duel; Day ? 6th Jury Member
Arnstein Vatle; 41, Askim	South Team	South Team	Robinson	14th Voted Out; Day 42; Lost Duel; Day ? 7th Jury Member
Frank Bo Lidahl; 26, Trondheim	North Team	North Team	Robinson	15th Voted Out; Day 45; Lost Challenge; Day ? 8th Jury Member
Tone Melstveit; 36, Sandnes	South Team	South Team	Robinson	16th Voted Out; Day 46; Lost Challenge; Day ? 9th Jury Member
Anne Sivertsen; 25, Løten	South Team	South Team	Robinson	Won Duel; Day ? Runner-Up; Day 47
Jan Stian Gundersen; 26, Stavanger	North Team	North Team	Robinson	Sole Survivor; Day 47
