= Robinsonekspedisjonen 2011 =

- Season 2011
- Presented by: Christer Falck
- No. of days: 47
- No. of castaways: 20
- Winner: Lillan Ramøy
- Runner-up: Cathrine Moen
- Location: Caramoan, Philippines
- No. of episodes: 13

Release
- Original network: TV3
- Original release: September 4 – November 27, 2011

Season chronology
- ← Previous; 2010 Next → Vinter

Robinsonekspedisjonen 2011 is the eleventh season of the Norwegian version of the Swedish show Expedition Robinson. This season premiered on 4 September 2011, and finished on 27 November. The main twist this season is that the contestants will be divided into two tribes known as Gamle (Old) and Unge (Young) based on their ages with those in Gamle being age forty and up and those in Unge being under the age of thirty.

== Finishing order ==
Contestant	Original tribe	Tribal swap	Merged tribe	Finish
Terje Pedersen; 70, Fredrikstad				Ejected; Day 1
Beatrice Bærem; 22, Halden	Unge			Lost Duel; Day 2
Christin Kalve; 40, Stord	Gamle			1st Voted Out; Day 3
Elisabet Madsen; 25, Hornnes	Unge			Evacuated; Day 5
Arild Grimsgård; 40, Alvdal	Gamle			2nd Voted Out; Day 6
Christina Ruste Hinna; 21, Hønefoss	Unge			Eliminated in Pick; Day ?
Anita Svensson; 45, Lindesnes	Gamle	South Team		3rd Voted Out; Day ?
Jan-Christian "Janki" Horntvedt; 31, Tønsberg	30 Year Olds	North Team		4th Voted Out; Day ?
Gabriel Holta; 22, Stavanger	Unge	North Team		5th Voted Out; Day ?
Marianne Moen; 47, Oslo	Gamle	South Team		6th Voted Out; Day ?
Bård Anders Langø; Returned to Game	30 Year Olds	North Team		7th Voted Out; Day ?
Even Falck-Urdalen; 36, Horten	30 Year Olds	South Team	Robinson	8th Voted Out; Day ?
Jon Torstein Bakken; 42, Frekhaug	Gamle	South Team	Robinson	9th Voted Out; 1st Jury Member; Day ?
Bård Anders Langø; 38, Sandnessjøen	30 Year Olds	North Team	Robinson	Won Duel; Day ? 10th Voted Out; 2nd Jury Member; Day ?
Nikolina Miletic; 30, Oslo	30 Year Olds	South Team	Robinson	Discovered as Mole; 3rd Jury Member; Day ?
Nicolas Jimmy Perle; 29, Tromsø	Unge	South Team	Robinson	Lost Duel; 4th Jury Member; Day ?
Morten Heierdal; 28, Furuset	Unge	South Team	Robinson	11th Voted Out; 5th Jury Member; Day ?
Hans-Olaf Hess; 46, Hurum	Gamle	North Team	Robinson	Lost Challenge; 6th Jury Member; Day ?
Hans Christian Philip Valstad; 23, Bærum	Unge	North Team	Robinson	Lost Challenge; 7th Jury Member; Day ?
Cathrine Moen; 20, Kolbotn	Unge	North Team	Robinson	Runner-Up; Day 47
Lillan Ramøy; 43, Nøtterøy	Gamle	North Team	Robinson	Sole Survivor; Day 47

== The game ==
First air date	Challenges		Eliminated	Vote	Finish
First air date	Reward	Immunity	Eliminated	Vote	Finish
September 4, 2011	Gamle	Unge	Beatrice	No Vote	Lost Challenge; Day 2
September 4, 2011	Gamle	Arild^{1}	Christin	5-2	1st Voted Out; Day 3
September 11, 2011	Unge	Unge	Elisabet	No Vote	Evacuated; Day ?
September 11, 2011	Unge	Unge	Arild	3-2-1	2nd Voted Out; Day ?
September 18, 2011	South Team	North Team	~~Gabriel~~; Christina^{2}	No Vote	Not Picked; Day ?
September 18, 2011	South Team	North Team	Anita, [Even, Jon]^{3}	5-2, [1-1-0-0-0-0]^{3}	3rd Voted Out; Day ?
September 25, 2011	None	South Team	Anita^{3}	No Vote	Left Cage; Day ?
September 25, 2011	None	South Team	Janki	5-2	4th Voted Out; Day ?
October 2, 2011	South Team	South Team	Gabriel	3-2-1	5th Voted Out; Day ?
October 9, 2011	None	None	Marianne^{4}	5-4-1-1	6th Voted Out; Day ?
October 9, 2011	None	None	Bård Anders^{4}	5-4-1-1	7th Voted Out; Day ?
October 9, 2011	None	Bård Anders^{4}	Marianne^{4}	No Vote	Lost Duel; Day ?
October 9, 2011	None	Hans Christian	Even	7-3	8th Voted Out; Day ?
October 16, 2011	Bård Anders, [Cathrine, Lillan]	None	Jon	5-2-1-1	9th Voted Out; 1st Jury Member; Day ?
October 23, 2011	Hans Christian, [Cathrine]	Lillan^{5}	Bård Anders	5-1	10th Voted Out; 2nd Jury Member; Day ?
October 30, 2011	Morten, [Cathrine, Lillan, Hans Christian]	None	Nikolina^{6}	No Vote^{6}	Discovered as Mole; 3rd Jury Member; Day ?
November 6, 2011	Nicolas, [Morten]	Morten	Nicolas	No Vote^{7}	Lost Duel; 4th Jury Member; Day ?
November 13, 2011	None	Cathrine	Morten	4-1^{8}	11th Voted Out; 5th Jury Member; Day ?
November 20, 2011	Recap Episode				
November 27, 2011	None	Lillan	Hans-Olaf; Hans Christian	No Vote	Lost Challenge; 6th Jury Member; Day ?
November 27, 2011	None	Cathrine	Hans-Olaf; Hans Christian	No Vote	Lost Challenge; 7th Jury Member; Day ?
November 27, 2011	None	None	Cathrine	4-3	Runner-Up
November 27, 2011	None	None	Lillan	4-3	Sole Survivor

^Note 1: As his team won the reward challenge and with it his duel, Arild was awarded individual immunity.
^Note 2: Though Gabriel was initially not chosen by either tribe, he was given the choice to pick someone else that would be eliminated instead of him. Before he could make his decision Christina stated that she would take his place so he wouldn't have to choose.
^Note 3: Prior to the vote the members of the South Team were asked to vote for two people that they thought deserved to be eliminated. As Anita was the person voted out of the tribe the two people she voted for, Even and Jon, were also told that they too would be excluded from the tribe. The three were then told that they would live together in exile until one of them left the competition.
^Note 4: Following the vote at tribal council, Bård Anders and Marianne took part in a duel in which the winner would get immunity and a spot in the merge tribe while the loser would be eliminated from the game.
^Note 5: When Lillan won immunity in episode eight she also won two extra votes at tribal council.
^Note 6: There was no vote at tribal council in episode nine as the three contestants marked by the mole correctly identified the mole as Nikolina.
^Note 7: In episode ten the contestants were initially voting for which contestant they wanted to take part in an elimination duel. As a result of this vote Hans-Olaf and Nicolas were forced to compete in said duel. Hans-Olaf won the duel so Nicolas was eliminated.
^Note 8: In episode eleven Hans-Olaf won a positive twist (two extra votes), as did Lillan (the right to take away someone's vote), while Morten received a negative twist (the loss of his right to vote).

== Voting History ==
	Original Tribes				Tribal Swap							Merge Tribe												
Episode #:	1		2		3		4		5	6				7	8		9	10		11	13			
Eliminated:	Beatrice; No vote^{1}	Christin; 5/7 votes^{2}	Elisabet; No vote	Arild; 3/6 votes	Christina; No vote^{3}	Anita; 5/7 votes^{4}	Anita; No vote^{4}	Janki; 5/7 votes	Gabriel; 3/6 votes	Marianne; 5/11 votes^{5}	Bård Anders; 4/11 votes^{5}	Marianne; No vote^{5}	Even; 7/10 votes	Jon; 5/9 votes	Tie^{6}	Bård Anders; 5/6 votes^{7}	Nikolina; No vote^{8}	Nicolas; No vote^{9}		Morten; 4/5 votes^{10},^{11}	Hans-Olaf; Hans Christian; No vote		Cathrine; 3/7 votes	Lillan; 4/7 votes
Voter	Vote																							
Lillan	Won	Christin		Arild	North			Janki	Gabriel	?			Even	Jon	Hans Christian; Hans Christian; Hans Christian	Bård Anders		Nicolas		Morten	Won		Jury Vote	
Catherine	Lost				North			Janki	Bård Anders	?			Even	Jon	Bård Anders	Bård Anders		Hans-Olaf		Hans-Olaf		Won	Jury Vote	
Hans Christian	Lost				North			Janki	Bård Anders	?			Even	Jon	Bård Anders	Tie	Nikolina	Hans-Olaf		Immune		Lost	Cathrine	
Hans-Olaf	Won	Christin		Arild	North			Janki	Gabriel	?			Even	Jon	Bård Anders	Bård Anders		Nicolas	Won	Morten; Morten; Morten		Lost		Lillan
Morten	Lost				South	Anita				?			Lillan	Nicolas	Bård Anders	Bård Anders	Nikolina	Hans-Olaf					Cathrine	
Nicolas	Lost				South	Anita				?			Even	Bård Anders	Bård Anders	Bård Anders	Nikolina	Cathrine	Lost					Lillan
Nikolina	Not in game			Hidden	South	Anita				?			Lillan	Lillan	Hans Christian	Hans Christian								Lillan
Bård Anders	Not in game			Hidden	North			Gabriel	Gabriel	?		Won	Even	Jon	Hans Christian	Tie								Lillan
Jon	Won	Christin		Arild	South	Anita	Stayed			?			Even	Nicolas									Cathrine	
Even	Not in game			Hidden	South	Anita	Stayed			?			Lillan											
Marianne	Won	Christin		Lillan	South	Jon				?		Lost												
Gabriel	Lost				North			Janki	Hans-Olaf															
Janki	Not in game			Hidden	North			Gabriel																
Anita	Won	Hans-Olaf		Jon	South	Jon	Left																	
Christina	Lost				Not Picked																			
Arild	Won	Christin		Jon																				
Elisabet	Lost																							
Christin	Won	Hans-Olaf																						
Beatrice	Lost																							

^1 Arild and Beatrice's tribes were both competing in a duel while their tribes were competing for reward. Whoever's tribe won the challenge would win immunity while the one whose tribe lost would be eliminated.
^2 At the first tribal council, Arild was given immunity as his tribe won the first duel.
^3 Though Gabriel was initially not chosen by either tribe, he was given the choice to pick someone else that would be eliminated instead of him. Before he could make his decision Christina stated that she would take his place so he wouldn't have to choose.
^4 Prior to the vote the members of the South Team were asked to vote for two people that they thought deserved to be eliminated. As Anita was the person voted out of the tribe the two people she voted for, Even and Jon, were also told that they too would be excluded from the tribe. The three were then told that they would live together in exile until one of them left the competition.
^5 Following the vote at tribal council, Bård Anders and Marianne took part in a duel in which the winner would get immunity and a spot in the merge tribe while the loser would be eliminated from the game.
^6 When Lillan won immunity in episode eight she also won two extra votes at tribal council.
^7At the ninth tribal council, both Bård Anders and Hans Christian received five votes. As Bård Anders received more votes in the re-vote he was eliminated.
^8 There was no vote at tribal council in episode nine as the three contestants marked by the mole correctly identified the mole as Nikolina.
^9 In episode ten the contestants were initially voting for which contestant they wanted to take part in an elimination duel. As a result of this vote Hans-Olaf and Nicolas were forced to compete in said duel. Hans-Olaf won the duel so Nicolas was eliminated.
^10 In episode eleven Hans-Olaf won a positive twist (two extra votes), as did Lillan (the right to take away someone's vote), while Morten received a negative twist (the loss of his right to vote).
^11 Prior to voting beginning at the twelfth tribal council, Hans Christian used his hidden immunity idol. This meant that no one could vote for Hans Christian.
