= Silje Torp =

Norwegian actress (born 1974)

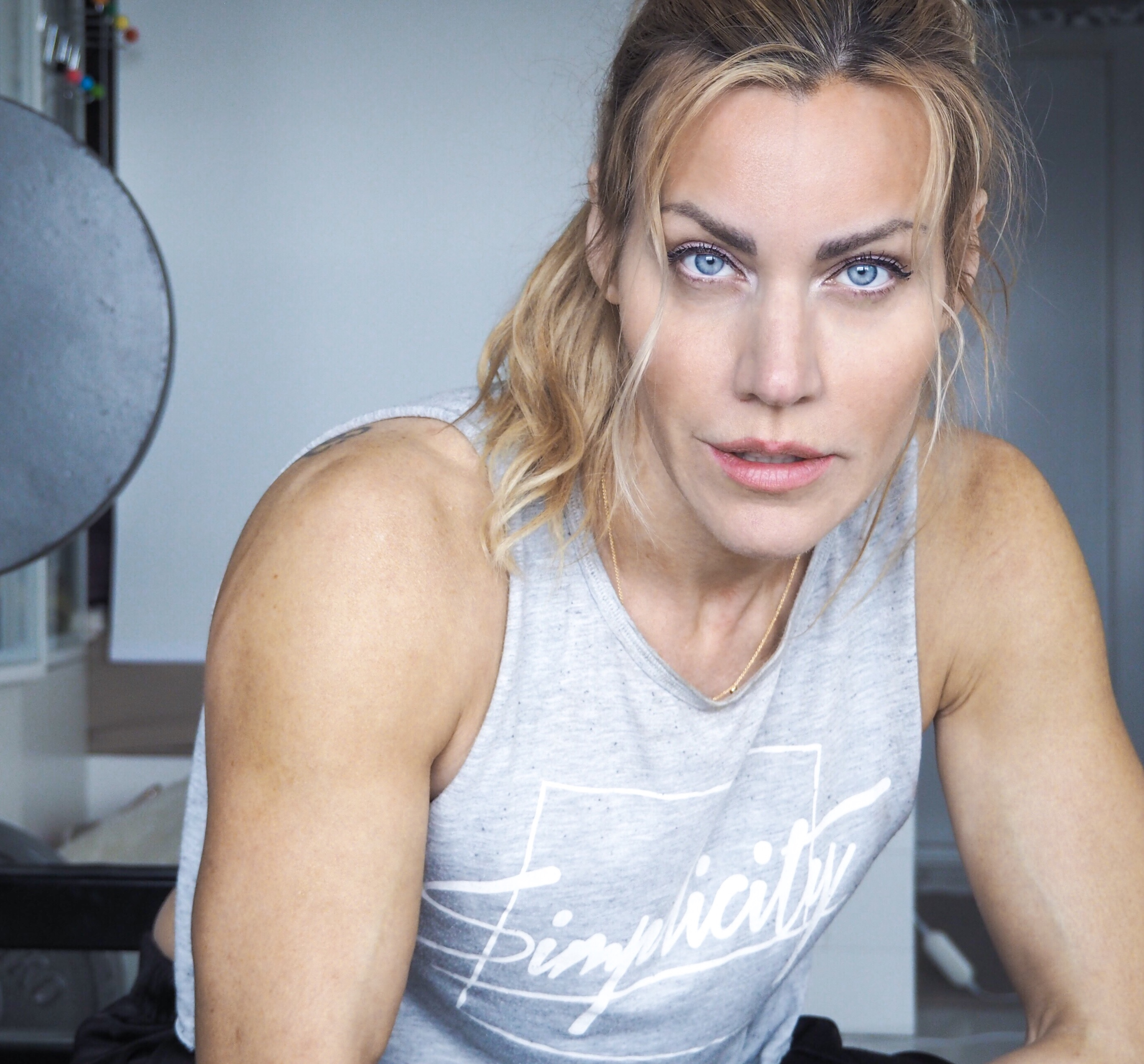
- Torp in 2019
- Born: Silje Torp Færavaag; 19 October 1974 (age 51); Oslo, Norway
- Education: Norwegian National Academy of Theatre
- Occupations: Actress; writer; fitness trainer
- Known for: Norsemen

Silje Torp (born Silje Torp Færavaag; 19 October 1974) is a Norwegian actress and author.

== Biography ==
Torp attended the Norwegian National Academy of Theatre from 1997 until 2000. Before that, she lived in Italy for three years and went to an art academy in Carrara, where she trained to become a sculptor/stonemason.

She came to international prominence with her role as the shield-maiden Frøya in the television series Norsemen between 2016 and 2020. The series was first shown on the Norwegian public broadcaster NRK, and later on the streaming platform Netflix. Torp was previously known for her role as sheriff Mette Hansen in season two of the series Lilyhammer.

== Publications ==
In January 2019, she published the book Sterk med strikk (Strong with Elastic) through Cappelen Damm.

== Selected filmography ==
=== Film ===
List of film appearances, with year, title, and role shown
Year	Title	Role	Notes
2004	Hawaii, Oslo	Milla	
2006	Comrade Pedersen	Anne Britt Bru	
2009	Knerten	Carolina	
2010	A Somewhat Gentle Man	offended woman	

=== Television ===
List of television appearances, with year, title, and role shown
Year	Title	Role	Notes
2010–2013	Dag	Marianne Refsnes	16 episodes
2013	Lilyhammer	Mette Hansen	4 episodes
2016–2020	Norsemen	Frøya	18 episodes
2021	Robinsonekspedisjonen	Presenter	15 Episodes
