= Robinsonekspedisjonen 2003 =

- Season 5
- Presented by: Christer Falck
- No. of days: 47
- No. of castaways: 16
- Winner: Emil Orderud
- Runner-up: Eva de Guia Worren
- Location: Malaysia

Release
- Original network: TV3
- Original release: 7 September – 7 December 2003

Season chronology
- ← Previous; 2002 Next → 2004

Robinsonekspedisjonen: 2003 is the fifth season of the Norwegian version of the Swedish show Expedition Robinson. It premiered on 7 September 2003 and aired until 7 December 2003.

== Season summary ==
The fifth season took place on an island in Malaysia. In the fifth season the number of contestants was lowered from eighteen to sixteen. A highlight from the first half of the season was the losing streak of the South team. In episode five there was a tribal swap in which both Mia and Marianne swapped tribes and each became the new chief of their new tribe. When the tribes merged, the members of the original South team tried hard to get members of the original North team to swap, but this was to no avail. In episode nine the contestants were randomly paired up and competed in a challenge for immunity. The pair that finished last in the challenge, Joachim and Vera, lost their voting rights. As a twist in episode nine, when one member of a pair was voted out the other was automatically eliminated as well which meant since Joachim was voted out, Vera was too. Following the double elimination, Joachim and Vera competed in a duel to see which of them would return to the game, Joachim won the duel. Upon Joachim's return he was furious with his fellow former alliance members Eva, Espen, and Gunnar who along with Vera made up a five-person alliance before Joachim was voted out. Shortly after his return Joachim was voted. Following Joachim's elimination, the original North team members eliminated Marit, the last original South team member. Ultimately, it was Emil Orderud who won the season over Eva Worren by an unknown jury vote.

== Finishing order ==
Contestant	Original Tribes	Episode 6 Tribes	Merged Tribe	Finish
Runar Grøndahl; 31, Oslo	South Team			1st Voted Out; Day ?
Silje Nilsen; 22, Tananger	South Team			Evacuated; Day ?
Rigmor Hustad; 26, Steinkjer	South Team			2nd Voted Out; Day ?
Terje Nybro Hansen; 34, Lillestrøm	South Team			3rd Voted Out; Day ?
Marco Elsafadi; 26, Bergen	North Team			4th Voted Out; Day ?
Christian Høibø; 23, Bø	South Team	South Team		5th Voted Out; Day ?
Kim Holm; 23, Oslo	South Team	South Team	Robinson	6th Voted Out; 1st Jury Member; Day ?
Mia Rebecca Jöms; 23, Fredrikstad	South Team	North Team	Robinson	7th Voted Out; 2nd Jury Member; Day ?
Joachim Bartholdsen; Returned to the game	North Team	North Team	Robinson	8th Voted Out; Day ?
Vera Margrete Olaussen; 41, Narvik	North Team	North Team	Robinson	Eliminated with Joachim; Day ? Lost Duel; Day ? 3rd Jury Member
Joachim Bartholdsen; 27, Arendal	North Team	North Team	Robinson	Won Duel; Day ? 9th Voted Out; 4th Jury Member; Day ?
Marit Herstad; 25, Trondheim	South Team	South Team	Robinson	10th Voted Out; 5th Jury Member; Day ?
Marianne Nygård; 26, Hokksund	North Team	South Team	Robinson	11th Voted Out; 6th Jury Member; Day ?
Gunnar Ofte; 33, Høydalsmo	North Team	North Team	Robinson	Lost Challenge; 7th Jury Member; Day ?
Espen Alf Halvorsen; 19, Nodeland	North Team	North Team	Robinson	Lost Challenge; 8th Jury Member; Day ?
Eva de Guia Worren; 24, Haugesund	North Team	North Team	Robinson	Runner-Up; Day 47
Emil Orderud; 23, Sørumsand	North Team	North Team	Robinson	Sole Survivor; Day 47
