= Robinsonekspedisjonen 2010 =

- Season 2010
- Presented by: Christer Falck
- No. of days: 47
- No. of castaways: 16
- Winner: Alita Dagmar Kristensen
- Runner-up: Stian Schie
- Location: Mersing District, Malaysia
- No. of episodes: 13

Release
- Original network: TV3
- Original release: September 12 – December 5, 2010

Season chronology
- ← Previous; 2009 Next → 2011

Robinsonekspedisjonen: 2010 is the tenth season of the Norwegian version of the Swedish show Expedition Robinson. It premiered on September 12, 2010.

== Season summary ==
The main twist this season is that the teams are divided up by region of origin with the members of the north team coming from northern Norway and the members of the south team coming from southern Norway. In episode 3, Kristine Ditlefsen, Jeanette Elstad, Cecilie Heramb, and Tone Olsen all entered the game as jokers with two of each joining one of the two teams. The game changed again in episode 5 when the teams were dissolved and two new teams were formed based on gender.

In a twist, in episode 6 Kim Cesar, Synnøve Kalleklev, Lisbeth Larsen, and Bjørnar Rødal entered the game as members of the newly formed west team. Along with this, in episode 6 the contestants temporarily returned to their original teams. However, following a duel in the same episode between David Sandem and Jeanette Elstad, in which Jeanette was eliminated, the two teams merged. Shortly after the merge took place the remaining contestants were evacuated from the island for about ten days due to a bird flu outbreak. In episode 7, the west competed in an individual immunity challenge. After the challenge, Kim was eliminated by the winner of the challenge Bjørnar. Following this, Bjørnar along with Lisbeth and Synnøve joined the merge tribe.

In episode 12, Atle Hansen and Synnøve competed in a duel against each other in which Synnøve was eliminated and Atle received reward. In the final episode of the season, the four semi-finalists initially competed in the plank competition. Following the challenge Tone was voted out of the game by the winner and first finalist Alita Kristensen. Then the two remaining losers of the first competition, Atle and Stian Schie, competed in a final duel. Stian won and became the second finalist. Eventually, Alita Dagmar Kristensen won the season over Stian Schie by a jury vote of 8-3, becoming the first contestant to have begun the competition on the North team to win since 2004.

== Finishing order ==
Contestant	Original Tribes	Episode 5 Tribes	Episode 6 Tribes	Merged Tribe	Finish
Kimhye Iversen; 29, Nesodden	South Team				1st Voted Out; Day 3
Maria Eliseussen; 24, Fredrikstad	North Team				2nd Voted Out; Day 6
Werner Solheim; 28, Frøskeland	North Team				3rd Voted Out; Day 9
Arvid Mallaug; 26, Sortland	North Team				4th Voted Out; Day 12
Ken Rune Berg; 36, Harstad	North Team	Men			5th Voted Out; Day 15
Jeanette Elstad; 24, Tromsø	North Team	Women	None		Lost Duel; Day 18
Randi-Anette Ejme; 29, Porsgrunn	South Team	Women	Robinson		6th Voted Out; Day 31
Kim Cesar; 25, Bergen		West Team	West Team		7th Voted Out; Day 32
Daniel Thorp; 23, Oslo	South Team	Men	Robinson	Robinson	8th Voted Out; 1st Jury Member; Day 34
Cecilie Heramb; 23, Elverum	South Team	Women	Robinson	Robinson	9th Voted Out; 2nd Jury Member; Day 37
Bjørnar Rødal; 29, Stavanger		West Team	West Team	Robinson	10th Voted Out; 3rd Jury Member; Day 39
Lisbeth Larsen; 27, Karmøy		West Team	West Team	Robinson	11th Voted Out; 4th Jury Member; Day 41
Dan Davidsen; 27, Korgen	North Team	Men	Robinson	Robinson	12th Voted Out; 5th Jury Member; Day 43
David Sandem; 29, Oslo	South Team	Men	Robinson	Robinson	13th Voted Out; 6th Jury Member; Day 43
Synnøve Kalleklev; 26, Fosnavåg		West Team	West Team	Robinson	Lost Duel; 7th Jury Member; Day 44
Kristine Ditlefsen; 22, Tromsø	North Team	Women	Robinson	Robinson	14th Voted Out; 8th Jury Member; Day 45
Tone Olsen; 30, Skien	South Team	Women	Robinson	Robinson	15th Voted Out; 9th Jury Member; Day 46
Atle Hansen; 45, Halden	South Team	Men	Robinson	Robinson	Lost Duel; 10th Jury Member; Day 46
Stian Schie; 26, Oslo	South Team	Men	Robinson	Robinson	Runner-Up; Day 47
Alita Dagmar Kristensen; 24, Alta	North Team	Women	Robinson	Robinson	Sole Survivor; Day 47

== The game ==
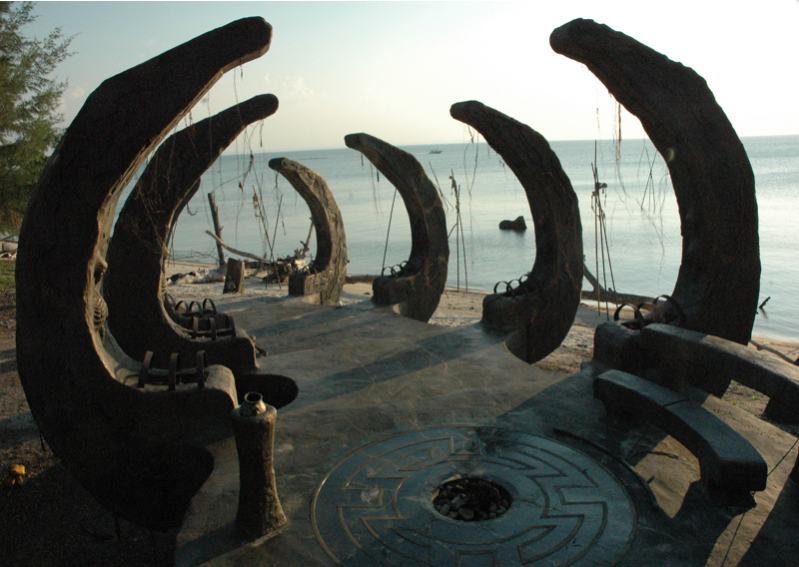
Tribal Council Area (Episode 1-4)

First air date	Challenges		Eliminated	Vote	Finish
First air date	Reward	Immunity	Eliminated	Vote	Finish
September 12, 2010	North Team	North Team	Kimhye	5-1	1st Voted Out; Day 3
September 12, 2010	North Team	David^{1}	Kimhye	5-1	1st Voted Out; Day 3
September 19, 2010	South Team	South Team	Maria	0-1-1-1-1^{3}	2nd Voted Out; Day 6
September 19, 2010	South Team	Arvid^{2}	Maria	0-1-1-1-1^{3}	2nd Voted Out; Day 6
September 26, 2010	South Team	South Team	Werner	7-1-1^{4}	3rd Voted Out; Day 9
October 3, 2010	South Team	South Team	Arvid	5-1	4th Voted Out; Day 12
October 3, 2010	South Team	Ken Rune^{5}	Arvid	5-1	4th Voted Out; Day 12
October 10, 2010	Men	Women	Ken Rune	2-0^{6}	5th Voted Out; Day 15
October 10, 2010	Men	David, Stian^{6}	Ken Rune	2-0^{6}	5th Voted Out; Day 15
October 17, 2010	None	None	Jeanette	No Vote^{7}	Lost Duel; Day 18
October 17, 2010	None	Alita	Randi-Anette	5-4-1	6th Voted Out; Day 31
October 24, 2010	None	Bjørnar	Kim	1-0^{8}	7th Voted Out; Day 32
October 24, 2010	None	David	Daniel^{9}	6-4	8th Voted Out; 1st Jury Member; Day 34
October 31, 2010	Stian, [David, Tone]	Stian	Cecilie	7-2-1-1	9th Voted Out; 2nd Jury Member; Day 37
November 7, 2010	Bjørnar, David, [Alita, Atle, Dan, Lisbeth, Stian, Synnøve]	Dan, Kristine, Lisbeth, Synnøve, Tone	Bjørnar^{10}	3-5-1-1^{10}	10th Voted Out; 3rd Jury Member; Day 39
November 14, 2010	Alita, Atle, Dan, Kristine, Tone, Stian, Synnøve	Dan	Lisbeth	5-3-1	11th Voted Out; 4th Jury Member; Day 41
November 14, 2010	Alita, Atle, Dan, Kristine, Tone, Stian, Synnøve	Synnøve^{11}	Lisbeth	5-3-1	11th Voted Out; 4th Jury Member; Day 41
November 21, 2010	Alita, David; Kristine, Tone	Synnøve^{12}	Dan	4-2-1-1	12th Voted Out; 5th Jury Member; Day 43
November 21, 2010	Alita, David; Kristine, Tone	Alita^{12}	David	4-1^{13}	13th Voted Out; 6th Jury Member; Day 43
November 28, 2010	Atle, [Kristine]^{15}	None	Synnøve	No Vote^{14}	Lost Duel; 7th Jury Member; Day 44
November 28, 2010	Atle, [Kristine]^{15}	Tone	Kristine^{16}	2-1	14th Voted Out; 8th Jury Member; Day 45
December 5, 2010	None	Alita	Tone	1-0	15th Voted Out; 9th Jury Member; Day 46
December 5, 2010	None	Stian	Atle	No Vote	Lost Duel; 10th Jury Member; Day 46
December 5, 2010	Jury Vote		Stian	8-3^{17}	Runner-Up
December 5, 2010	Jury Vote		Alita	8-3^{17}	Sole Survivor

^Note 1: Following their win at the immunity challenge, the north team was allowed to give one member of the south team immunity at tribal council. The north team chose to give immunity to David.

^Note 2: During the immunity challenge, Christer revealed an individual immunity idol back at the starting line. The first person from the losing team to reach this idol would have immunity at the second tribal council. As Arvid reached it first, he was immune at the second tribal council.

^Note 3: As Maria was the only person not to receive an amulet at the second tribal council, she was eliminated from the game.

^Note 4: At the third tribal council, both Alita and Ken had two votes they could cast as opposed to just one.

^Note 5: Following their win at the immunity challenge, the south team was allowed to give one member of the north team immunity at tribal council. The south team chose to give immunity to Ken.

^Note 6: At the fifth immunity challenge, Tone, having won the challenge for the newly formed Women's tribe, was given the power to choose who of the men would have immunity at the fifth tribal council through shooting plates that had their names on them. As both David and Stian's plates were still intact when Tone ran out of bullets they both had immunity at the fifth tribal council. In addition to this, David and Stian were the only ones who could vote at the fifth tribal council.

^Note 7: Jeanette was eliminated after losing a duel against David.

^Note 8: Following an individual immunity challenge that only the West team competed in, Bjørnar, as the winner, was told that he had to immediately vote out one member of the team. He chose to eliminate Kim.

^Note 9: As both Cecilie and Daniel received five votes at the seventh tribal council, all of the other contestants were told they had to vote again in a re-vote.

^Note 10: At the ninth tribal council, the contestant that received the most votes would be forced to compete in a duel against their partner from the reward challenge. As a result, David faced off in a duel against Bjørnar to determine who would be eliminated. Ultimately, David won the duel.

^Note 11: At the tenth tribal council, Synnøve was immune as she had bought immunity during the auction that took place at the reward challenge.

^Note 12: As the contestants were temporarily split into two groups following the reward challenge, two immunity challenges took place.

^Note 13 During the second vote at the eleventh tribal councils, only David and Kristine could be voted for and could not vote.

^Note 14 Synnøve was eliminated after losing a duel to Atle.

^Note 15 As Atle won the duel against Synnøve, he was also given reward which he could share with one other person.

^Note 16 As Kristine received the most votes in the second vote at the twelfth tribal council, she was forced to compete in a duel against Stian, which she lost.

^Note 17 As Tone was technically the last person voted out of the game, she was allowed to vote twice during the jury vote.

== Voting History ==
	Original Tribes				Gender Tribes	No Tribes	West Team		Merge Tribe													
Episode #:	1	2	3	4	5	6		7			8	9	10	11		12			13			
Eliminated:	Kimhye; 5/6 votes^{1}	Maria; 0/4 votes^{2}, ^{3}	Werner; 7/9 votes^{4}	Arvid; 5/6 votes^{5}	Ken Rune; 2/2 votes^{6}	Jeanette; No vote	Randi-Anette; 5/10 votes	Kim; 1/1 vote^{7}	Tie	Daniel; 6/10 votes^{8}	Cecilie; 7/11 votes	Bjørnar; 3/10 votes^{9}	Lisbeth; 5/9 votes	Dan; 4/8 votes	David; 4/5 votes^{10}	Synnøve; No vote	Second Vote	Kristine; 2/3 votes^{11}	Tone; 1/1 vote	Atle; No vote	Stian; 3/11 votes	Alita; 8/11 votes^{12}
Voter	Vote																					
Alita			Werner; Werner	Arvid			Randi-Anette		Daniel	Daniel	Cecilie	Bjørnar	Lisbeth	Atle	Kristine		Kristine	Kristine	Tone		Jury Vote	
Stian	Kimhye				Ken Rune		Dan		Cecilie	Cecilie	Cecilie	Bjørnar	Lisbeth	Dan	David		Kristine	Kristine		Won	Jury Vote	
Atle	Kimhye						Randi-Anette		Daniel	Daniel	Alita	~~David~~	Lisbeth	Dan	David	Won	Stian	None		Lost	Stian	
Tone	Not in game						Randi-Anette		Daniel	Daniel	Cecilie	~~David~~	Lisbeth	Dan	David		Stian; Atle	Atle				Alita; Alita
Kristine	Not in game		Werner	Arvid			Randi-Anette		Cecilie	Daniel	Cecilie	~~David~~	David	Dan			Stian	None				Alita
Synnøve	Not in game				Hidden				Cecilie	Daniel	Cecilie	~~David~~	David	David	David	Lost						Alita
David	Kimhye				Ken Rune	Won	Dan		Cecilie	Cecilie	Cecilie	Atle	Lisbeth	Atle								Alita
Dan		Ken Rune	Werner	Arvid			Randi-Anette		Stian	Daniel	Kristine	Bjørnar	Atle	Kristine							Stian	
Lisbeth	Not in game				Hidden				Daniel	Cecilie	Bjørnar	~~David~~	David									Alita
Bjørnar	Not in game				Hidden			Kim	Dan	Cecilie	Cecilie	Stian										Alita
Cecilie	Not in game						Stian		Daniel	None	Kristine											Alita
Daniel	Kimhye						Dan		Cecilie	None											Stian	
Kim	Not in game				Hidden																	
Randi-Anette	Kimhye						Dan															
Jeanette	Not in game		Werner	Arvid		Lost																
Ken Rune		Werner	Werner; Werner	Arvid																		
Arvid		Dan	Kristine	Dan																		
Werner		Alita	Dan																			
Maria																						
Kimhye	Atle																					

^1 At the first tribal council, David was given immunity by the north team.
^2 As Arvid won individual immunity at the second immunity challenge, he was immune at the second tribal council.
^3 As Arvid had immunity at the second tribal council, he was asked to give one person immunity through an amulet. By giving this person immunity he was voting to keep this person in the game. That person would then be asked to give someone else immunity and so on until only one person would be left without an amulet and would be eliminated from the game.
^4 As new contestants, Jeanette and Kristine had the right to give one tribemate each the right to a second vote at tribal council. Jeanette chose to give Alita the right to a second vote, while Kristine gave this power to Ken.
^5 At the fourth tribal council, Ken was given immunity by the south team.
^6 At the fifth tribal council, as David and Stian had immunity they were the only members on the men's tribe that were eligible to vote.
^7 Following his win at the West team's immunity challenge, Bjørnar was the only one permitted to vote.
^8 At the seventh tribal council, both Cecilie and Daniel received five votes. as Daniel received more votes in the re-vote he was eliminated.
^9 At the ninth tribal council, the contestant that received the most votes would be forced to compete in a duel against their partner from the reward challenge. As a result, David faced off in a duel against Bjørnar to determine who would be eliminated. Ultimately, David won the duel.
^10 During the second vote at the eleventh tribal council, only David and Kristine could be voted for and were not allowed to vote.
^11 As Atle and Kristine both received votes during the initial vote at the twelfth tribal council, they were the only two who could receive votes during the second vote to determine who would face off against Stian in a duel. As Kristine received more votes she faced Stian in the duel in which she lost and was eliminated.
^12 As Tone was technically the last person voted out of the game, she was allowed to vote twice during the jury vote.
