= No Limite =

- Genre: Reality competition
- Created by: Charlie Parsons
- Based on: Survivor
- Presented by: Zeca Camargo (2000–01/2009); André Marques (2021); Fernando Fernandes (2022–23)
- Country of origin: Brazil
- Original language: Portuguese
- No. of seasons: 7
- No. of episodes: 83

Production
- Running time: 60 minutes
- Production company: Endemol Shine Brasil

Original release
- Network: TV Globo
- Release: July 23, 2000 – August 17, 2023

Related
- Expedition Robinson; International versions

No Limite (English: On the Edge) is the Brazilian version of the international Survivor reality competition television franchise, itself derived from the Swedish television series Expedition Robinson created by Charlie Parsons which premiered in 1997. The series premiered on Sunday, July 23, 2000, on TV Globo and was initially hosted by journalist Zeca Camargo.

No Limite was originally cancelled in 2001 after three seasons, due to the consistent ratings decline starting in season two. TV Globo would briefly revive the series for a fourth season in 2009. A follow-up season titled No Limite: Xtream was planned for 2010 but was ultimately scrapped. In 2021, the series was revived for a second time with actor André Marques as the new host and 16 returning housemates of Big Brother Brasil as contestants. After a lackluster performance, Marques was replaced by paracanoe athlete Fernando Fernandes on season six.

== Format ==
The show basically follows the structure and all elements of the Survivor franchise, with some modifications. Contestants are split into two tribes, are taken to a remote isolated location and are forced to live off the land with meagre supplies for a period of several weeks. Frequent physical and mental challenges are used to pit the tribes against each other for rewards, such as food or luxuries, or for immunity, forcing the other tribe to attend Tribal Council, where they must vote one of their tribemates out of the game by secret ballot.

About halfway through the game, the tribes are merged into a single tribe, and challenges are on an individual basis; winning immunity prevents that player from being voted out.

The first three seasons feature "semi-finals" and "finals", and the final consisted of a great marathon of tests (physical and logical) involving elements used throughout the season. The final result was revealed live (with the exception of the first season) by the presenter. In the fourth season, the first five eliminations were decided by public vote. And in the final, all the contestants eliminated after the merger began to compose a jury, which would decide the winner, through a live vote. In the fifth season eliminated two pairs of contestants at the final six, and the winner was decided by a public vote.

== Series overview ==
List of No Limite seasons
#	Location	Days	Castaways	Original tribes	Winner	Runner-up	Grand prize	Host
Original series
1	Aquiraz, Ceará	23	12	Two tribes of six	Elaine de Melo	Pipa Diniz	R$300.000	Zeca Camargo
2	Chapada dos Guimarães, Mato Grosso	23	12	Two tribes of six	Léo Rassi	Christina Moreira	R$300.000	Zeca Camargo
3	Marajó, Pará	23	12	Two tribes of six	Rodrigo Trigueiro	Hérica Sanfelice	R$300.000	Zeca Camargo
Revived series
4	Trairi, Ceará	62	23	Two tribes of ten	Luciana Araújo	Gabriela Costa	R$500.000	Zeca Camargo
Current series
5	Beberibe, Ceará	23	16	Two tribes of eight former Big Brother Brasil housemates	Paula Amorim	Viegas de Carvalho	R$500.000	André Marques
6	Trairi, Ceará	48	24	Two tribes of twelve	Charles Gama	Ipojucan Ícaro	R$500.000	Fernando Fernandes
7	Rio Negro, Amazonas	21	15	Two tribes of seven or eight	Dedé Macedo	Raiana Bertoso	R$500.000	Fernando Fernandes

== Companion series ==
Since 2021, in addition to the main series, two companion shows are also produced for No Limite.

=== No Limite – A Eliminação ===
A spin-off series titled No Limite – A Eliminação (No Limite – The Elimination) airs alongside the show on Multishow on Wednesday nights and on TV Globo on Sunday nights featuring a weekly re-cap episode and interview with the eliminated contestant.

=== Bate Papo No Limite ===
An online spin-off show titled Bate Papo No Limite (Chat No Limite) airs live immediately following the episodes on Gshow and Globoplay featuring exclusive content across social media sites and interviews hosted by Ana Clara Lima with the eliminated contestants and celebrity guests.

== Ratings and reception ==
=== Brazilian ratings ===
All numbers are in points and provided by Kantar Ibope Media.

Season	Timeslot (BRT)	Premiered		Ended		TV season	SP viewers (in points)	Source
Season	Timeslot (BRT)	Date	Viewers (in points)	Date	Viewers (in points)	TV season	SP viewers (in points)	Source
Original series
1	Sunday 11:00 p.m.	July 23, 2000	46.0	September 10, 2000	50.0	2000	—N/a	
2	Sunday 11:00 p.m.	January 28, 2001	34.0	March 25, 2001	41.0	2001	—N/a	
3	Sunday 11:00 p.m.	October 28, 2001	33.0	December 23, 2001	37.0	2001	—N/a	
Revived series
4	Thursday 11:00 p.m. Sunday 11:00 p.m.	July 30, 2009	25.0	September 27, 2009	17.0	2009	18.00	
Current series
5	Tuesday 10:30 p.m.	May 11, 2021	21.4	July 20, 2021	16.3	2021	17.48	
6	Tuesday 10:30 p.m. Thursday 10:30 p.m.	May 3, 2022	17.3	July 7, 2022	16.7	2022	16.14	
7	Tuesday 10:30 p.m. Thursday 10:30 p.m.	July 18, 2023	14.0	August 17, 2023	15.9	2023	15.11	
