= Emboaca =

Coordinates: 3.208°S 39.312°W

Emboaca is a little fishing village in the municipality of Trairi in the state of Ceará, Brazil. The village has about 500 inhabitants and lies beside the highway from Trari to Mundaú.

== Fishing ==
Fishing is the main source of income for the people of Emboaca. All the men sail the sea on jangadas which are rather small and simplistic. These courageous men used to sail 200 kilometres, being away for a week. Nowadays, a mere 50 kilometres is travelled to get lobsters and camurupim.

Despite the small size of the ships (10 by 4 feet) there are hardly any accidents, but if they happen heroic tales are dragged out of them that are to be told for many years. The accidents usually involve the gigantic waves caught by tankers. The tankers couldn't see the fishermen since they didn't carry any lights. These accidents don't really happen anymore because the fishermen don't sail out that far anymore and now can take safe lights.

The fishing still is dangerous though; in May 2014, a ship was found with three fishermen from a little village near Fortaleza. They got lost on sea for three days, and one of them even died on the boat, before they saw land and were found in Guajiru.

== Infrastructure and public transport ==
There are no busses in Emboaca. You better call a taxi which can bring you around. Ita infrastructure is very simple: one road running through the centre. On the side of the beach there are a lot of little bars and restaurants and on the other side the few houses and the church are located.

== Nature ==
Most of Emboaca's natural vegetation is still intact. The village and surrounding are full with palm trees, banana plants, cashew trees, castanholas, sugar canes, guajiru and mango trees. In the sand dunes behind the village there are hardly any plants at all, cows and donkeys walk around freely and wind blows hard off the steep dunes.
