= No Limite season 6 =

No Limite
- Season 6
- Presented by: Fernando Fernandes; Ana Clara Lima
- No. of days: 48
- No. of castaways: 24
- Winner: Charles Gama
- Runners-up: Ipojucan Ícaro; Lucas Santana
- Location: Trairi, Ceará, Brazil
- No. of episodes: 20

Release
- Original network: TV Globo
- Original release: May 3 – July 7, 2022

Additional information
- Filming dates: April 21 – June 8, 2022

Season chronology
- ← Previous; Season 5 Next → Amazônia

The sixth season of the Brazilian competitive reality television series No Limite, based on the international reality game show franchise Survivor, premiered on Tuesday, May 3, 2022, at 10:30 p.m. / 9:30 p.m. (BRT / AMT) on TV Globo.

On January 6, 2022, paracanoe athlete and former Big Brother Brasil 2 housemate Fernando Fernandes was officially announced as the new host for the series, replacing André Marques.

The season was filmed in the brazilian state of Ceará, marking the fourth time No Limite has filmed there (the first being 2000). The filming locations for this season were the same as those used in the fourth season, in Trairi.

The grand prize is R$500.000 with tax allowances and a brand new Jeep Renegade, plus a R$100.000 prize offered to the runner-up and a R$50.000 prize offered to the contestant in third place.

An early 15-minute preview of the season aired right before Globo's broadcast of the season finale of Big Brother Brasil 22 on April 26, 2022, where the 24 new castaways were revealed.

On July 7, 2022, Charles Gama won the competition with 51.42% of the public vote over runner-up Ipojucan Ícaro (24.43%) and third place finisher Lucas Santana (24.15%), thus becoming the show's first openly gay winner. This season creates the first ever all-male final two, with all the final four contestants also being men who identify as part of the LGBT community.

== Contestants ==
List of No Limite (season 6) contestants
Contestant	Original Tribe	First Switch	Second Switch	Merged Tribe	Finish
Dayane Sena; 26, Belford Roxo, RJ	Lua				1st Voted Out; Day 3
Verônica Kreitchmann; 28, Porto Alegre, RS	Sol				2nd Voted Out; Day 6
Adriano Gannam; 42, São Lourenço, MG	Lua				3rd Voted Out; Day 8
Kamyla Romaniuk; 30, Ji-Paraná, RO	Lua				4th Voted Out; Day 10
Shirley Gonçalves; 51, Sobral, CE	Lua				5th Voted Out; Day 13
Leonardo Correa; 34, Tubarão, SC	Sol				6th Voted Out; Day 15
Roberta Terra; 38, Rio de Janeiro, RJ	Lua				7th Voted Out; Day 17
Patrícia Tomé; 45, Nova Friburgo, RJ	Sol				8th Voted Out; Day 20
Vanderlei Ramiro; 30, São Paulo, SP	Sol				9th Voted Out; Day 22
Guza Rezê; 40, Salvador, BA	Lua				10th Voted Out; Day 24
Bruna Negreska; 32, São Paulo, SP	Lua	Lua			11th Voted Out; Day 26
Matheus Pires; 30, Rio de Janeiro, RJ	Sol	Lua			12th Voted Out; Day 28
Rodrigo Moraes; 45, Foz do Iguaçu, PR	Lua	Sol	Sol		13th Voted Out; Day 31
Tiemi Hiratsuka; 30, Mogi das Cruzes, SP	Sol	Sol	Sol		14th Voted Out; Day 34
Janaron Uhãy; 27, Santa Cruz Cabrália, BA	Lua	Sol	Sol	Estrela	15th Voted Out; Day 36
Ninha Santiago; 33, Ipojuca, PE	Sol	Sol	Sol	Estrela	16th Voted Out; Day 38
Pedro Castro; 32, Maringá, PR	Sol	Lua	Lua	Estrela	17th Voted Out; Day 41
Flavia Assis; 42, Mauá, SP	Sol	Sol	Sol	Estrela	18th Voted Out; Day 43
Andréa Nascimento; 31, Maceió, AL	Sol	Sol	Sol	Estrela	19th Voted Out; Day 45
Clécio Barbosa; 44, Jaboatão, PE	Sol	Sol	Lua	Estrela	Eliminated; Day 47
Victor Hugo de Castro; 27, Goiânia, GO	Lua	Lua	Lua	Estrela	Eliminated; Day 48
Lucas Santana; 31, Aracaju, SE	Sol	Sol	Lua	Estrela	2nd Runner-up; Day 48
Ipojucan Ícaro; 29, Pequeri, MG	Lua	Lua	Lua	Estrela	Runner-up; Day 48
Charles Gama; 29, Angra dos Reis, RJ	Lua	Lua	Lua	Estrela	Sole Survivor; Day 48

== Season summary ==
Challenge winners and eliminations by episodes
Episode		Challenge winner(s)		Eliminated	Result
No.	Air date	Reward	Immunity	Eliminated	Result
1	3 May 2022	Lua	Sol	Dayane	1st voted out Day 3
1	3 May 2022	Lua	Sol	Dayane	1st voted out Day 3
2	5 May 2022	Sol	Lua	Verônica	2nd voted out Day 6
3	10 May 2022	Lua	Sol	Adriano	3rd voted out Day 8
4	12 May 2022	Lua	Sol	Kamyla	4th voted out Day 10
5	17 May 2022	Sol	Sol	Shirley	5th voted out Day 13
6	19 May 2022	Sol	Lua	Leonardo	6th voted out Day 15
7	24 May 2022	Sol	Sol	Roberta	7th voted out Day 17
8	26 May 2022	Lua	Lua	Patrícia	8th voted out Day 20
9	31 May 2022	Sol	Lua	Vanderlei	9th voted out Day 22
10	2 June 2022	Lua	Sol	Guza	10th voted out Day 24
11	7 June 2022	Lua	Sol	Bruna	11th voted out Day 26
12	9 June 2022	Lua	Sol	Matheus	12th voted out Day 28
13	14 June 2022	Lua	Lua	Rodrigo	13th voted out Day 31
14	16 June 2022	Sol	Lua	Tiemi	14th voted out Day 34
15	21 June 2022	Ipojucan [Charles, Victor]	Charles	Janaron	15th voted out Day 36
16	23 June 2022	Pedro	Charles	Ninha	16th voted out Day 38
17	28 June 2022	Lucas	Ipojucan	Pedro	17th voted out Day 41
18	30 June 2022	Ipojucan	Clécio	Flavia	18th voted out Day 43
19	5 July 2022	Charles	Clécio	Andréa	19th voted out Day 45
20	7 July 2022	(none)	Charles, Ipojucan, Lucas, Victor	Clécio	Eliminated; Day 47
20	7 July 2022	(none)	Ipojucan, Lucas, Charles	Victor	Eliminated; Day 48
20	7 July 2022			Public vote	
20	7 July 2022			Lucas	Third place
20	7 July 2022			Ipojucan	Runner-up
20	7 July 2022			Charles	Sole Survivor

== Voting history ==
	Original tribes												First switch		Second switch		Merged tribe						
Episode	1	2	3	4	5		6	7		8	9	10	11	12	13	14	15	16	17	18	19	20	
Day	3	6	8	10	13		15	17		20	22	24	26	28	31	34	36	38	41	43	45	47	48
Tribe	Lua	Sol	Lua	Lua	Lua		Sol	Lua		Sol	Sol	Lua	Lua	Lua	Sol	Sol	Estrela	Estrela	Estrela	Estrela	Estrela	Estrela	Estrela
Eliminated	Dayane	Verônica	Adriano	Kamyla	Shirley		Leonardo	Tie (Note: The first vote resulted in a tie. Per the rules, the non-tied castaways must come to a unanimous decision as to whom to eliminate between the tied castaways, or else one of the non-immune castaways would be designated with choosing whom to eliminate, after a random draw.)	Roberta	Patrícia	Vanderlei	Guza	Bruna	Matheus	Rodrigo	Tiemi	Janaron	Ninha	Pedro	Flavia	Andréa	CIécio	Victor
Vote	6-5-1	9-3	7-3-1	8-2	7-2-1		7-3-1	4-4	1-0 (Note: As the non-tied contestants were unable to come up with a unanimous decision to vote out either Bruna or Roberta, Victor was designated with choosing whom to eliminate, after a random draw. He chose Roberta.)	7-2-1	7-1-1	6-1	5-1	3-2	5-1	4-1	6-1-1-1-1	6-1-1-1	7-1 (Note: Ipojucan won an extra immunity this episode after finding a secret idol at the tribe’s camp.)	5-2	5-1	Challenge	Challenge
Voter	Votes																						
Charles	Guza		Kamyla	Kamyla	Shirley			Roberta	Immune (Note: The non-tied castaways that were not drawn by a random draw were not eligible to vote in the third round of voting, since as they could not reach a consensus in the second round of voting, only the contestant drawn was designated with choosing whom to eliminate.)			Guza	Bruna	Matheus			Janaron	Ninha	Pedro	Flavia	Andréa	Immune	Immune
Ipojucan	Guza		Adriano	Kamyla	Shirley			Roberta	Immune			Guza	Bruna	Matheus			Janaron	Ninha	Pedro	Flavia	Andréa	Immune	Immune
Lucas		Verônica					Leonardo			Patrícia	Vanderlei						Janaron	Ninha	Pedro	Flavia	Andréa	Immune	Immune
Victor	Guza		Kamyla	Kamyla	Shirley	Shirley (Note: Victor played the extra vote advantage, allowing him to cast two ballots on Shirley.)		Roberta	Roberta			Guza	Bruna	Matheus			Janaron	Ninha	Pedro	Flavia	Andréa	Immune	Eliminated
Clécio		Verônica					Patrícia			Matheus	Matheus						Janaron	Ninha	Pedro	Flavia	Andréa	Eliminated	
Andréa		Verônica					Leonardo			Patrícia	Vanderlei				Rodrigo	Tiemi	Ipojucan	Ipojucan	Pedro	Ipojucan	Ipojucan		
Flavia		Verônica					Leonardo			Patrícia	Vanderlei				Rodrigo	Tiemi	Victor	Victor	Pedro	Ipojucan			
Pedro		Verônica					Leonardo			Patrícia	Vanderlei		Bruna (Note: Matheus and Pedro were immune this voting.)	Ipojucan			Janaron	Ninha	Victor				
Ninha		Verônica					Leonardo			Patrícia	Vanderlei				Rodrigo	Tiemi	Pedro	Pedro					
Janaron	Kamyla		Adriano	Kamyla	Shirley			Bruna	Immune			Guza			Rodrigo	Tiemi	Ninha						
Tiemi		Verônica					Leonardo			Patrícia	Vanderlei				Rodrigo	Andréa							
Rodrigo	Dayane		Adriano	Kamyla	Shirley			Bruna	Immune			Guza			Ninha								
Matheus		Verônica					Leonardo			Patrícia	Vanderlei		Bruna	Ipojucan									
Bruna	Guza		Kamyla	Kamyla	Shirley			Roberta	None (Note: Bruna and Roberta were ineligible to vote in the second round of voting, as they were the two tied contestants and could not participate in the decision.)			Guza	Charles										
Guza	Dayane		Adriano	Ipojucan	Ipojucan			Bruna	Immune			Victor											
Vanderlei		Matheus					Matheus			Matheus	Ninha												
Patrícia		Matheus					Matheus			Ninha													
Roberta	Dayane		Adriano	Kamyla	Bruna			Bruna	None														
Leonardo		Verônica					Matheus																
Shirley	Dayane		Adriano	Kamyla	Bruna																		
Kamyla	Dayane		Adriano	Ipojucan																			
Adriano	Dayane		Guza																				
Verônica		Matheus																					
Dayane	Guza																						

Public vote
Finalist	% of vote	Result
Charles	51.42	Sole Survivor
Ipojucan	24.43	Runner-up
Lucas	24.15	2nd runner-up

== Ratings and reception ==
=== Brazilian ratings ===
All numbers are in points and provided by Kantar Ibope Media.

Episode	Air date	Timeslot (BRT)	SP viewers (in points)	Source
0	April 26, 2022	Tuesday 10:30 p.m.	25.4	
1	May 3, 2022	Tuesday 10:30 p.m.	17.3	
2	May 5, 2022	Thursday 10:30 p.m.	17.1	
3	May 10, 2022	Tuesday 10:30 p.m.	17.8	
4	May 12, 2022	Thursday 10:30 p.m.	16.9	
5	May 17, 2022	Tuesday 10:30 p.m.	14.6	
6	May 19, 2022	Thursday 10:30 p.m.	16.9	
7	May 24, 2022	Tuesday 10:30 p.m.	16.3	
8	May 26, 2022	Thursday 10:30 p.m.	17.0	
9	May 31, 2022	Tuesday 10:30 p.m.	16.9	
10	June 2, 2022	Thursday 10:30 p.m.	15.8	
11	June 7, 2022	Tuesday 10:30 p.m.	16.2	
12	June 9, 2022	Thursday 10:30 p.m.	15.7	
13	June 14, 2022	Tuesday 10:30 p.m.	16.5	
14	June 16, 2022	Thursday 10:30 p.m.	16.5	
15	June 21, 2022	Tuesday 10:30 p.m.	15.9	
16	June 23, 2022	Thursday 10:30 p.m.	16.0	
17	June 28, 2022	Tuesday 10:30 p.m.	13.4	
18	June 30, 2022	Thursday 10:30 p.m.	16.2	
19	July 5, 2022	Tuesday 10:30 p.m.	15.4	
20	July 7, 2022	Thursday 10:30 p.m.	16.7	

No Limite – A Eliminação

Episode	Air date	Timeslot (BRT)	SP viewers (in points)	Source
1	May 8, 2022	Sunday 11:30 p.m.	12.2	
2	May 15, 2022	Sunday 11:30 p.m.	11.6	
3	May 22, 2022	Sunday 11:30 p.m.	10.7	
4	May 29, 2022	Sunday 11:30 p.m.	10.1	
5	June 5, 2022	Sunday 11:30 p.m.	11.0	
6	June 12, 2022	Sunday 11:30 p.m.	09.4	
7	June 19, 2022	Sunday 11:30 p.m.	10.4	
8	June 26, 2022	Sunday 11:30 p.m.	09.6	
9	July 3, 2022	Sunday 11:30 p.m.	08.7	

- In 2022, each point represents 258.821 households in 15 market cities in Brazil (74.666 households in São Paulo).
