= Barra Grande =

Coordinates: 3.2748°S 39.20027°W

Barra Grande is a little seaside village in the municipality of Trairi, Ceará, Brazil. It has about 200 inhabitants.

== Infrastructure ==
There are two ways to reach Barra Grande: by the road from Trairi passing Cana Brava, and over the beach from Lagoinha or Guajiru. Inside the village there are only a few bars and a few hotels.

== Nature ==
Most of Barra Grande's natural vegetation is still intact. The village and surroundings are full with palm trees, banana plants, cashew trees, castanholas, sugar canes, guajiru and mango trees. In the sand dunes behind the village there are hardly any plants at all, cows and donkeys walk around freely and wind blows hard off the steep dunes.

== Fishing ==
Fishing is the main source of income for the people of Barra Grande. All the men sail the sea on jangadas which are rather small and simplistic. These courageous men used to sail 200 kilometres, being away for a week. Nowadays a mere 50 kilometres is travelled to get lobsters and camurupim

Despite the small size of the ships (10 by 4 feet) there are hardly any accidents, but if they happen heroic tales are dragged out of them that are to be told for many years. The accidents usually involve gigantic waves caught by tankers. The tankers couldn't see the fishermen since they didn't carry any lights. These accidents don't really happen anymore because the fishermen don't sail out that far anymore and can now take safe lights.

The fishing still is dangerous though. In May 2014 a boat was found with three fishermen from a little village near Fortaleza. They got lost at sea for three days, one of them even died on the boat, before they saw land and were found in Guajiru.
