= Flecheiras =

Coordinates: 3.222°S 39.266°W

Flecheiras is a fishing village on the northeastern coast of Ceará, Brazil. It has about 1200 permanent residents. Flecheiras is located 6 kilometres (3.7 mi) from Guajiru along the road from Guajiru to Trairi.

== Industry ==
The traditional industry in Flecheiras is fishing, but in recent years, tourism has gained importance. Together with the nearby village of Cumbuco, it has become a popular kiteboarding destination.
