= Carol Nakamura =

Brazilian actress (born 1983)

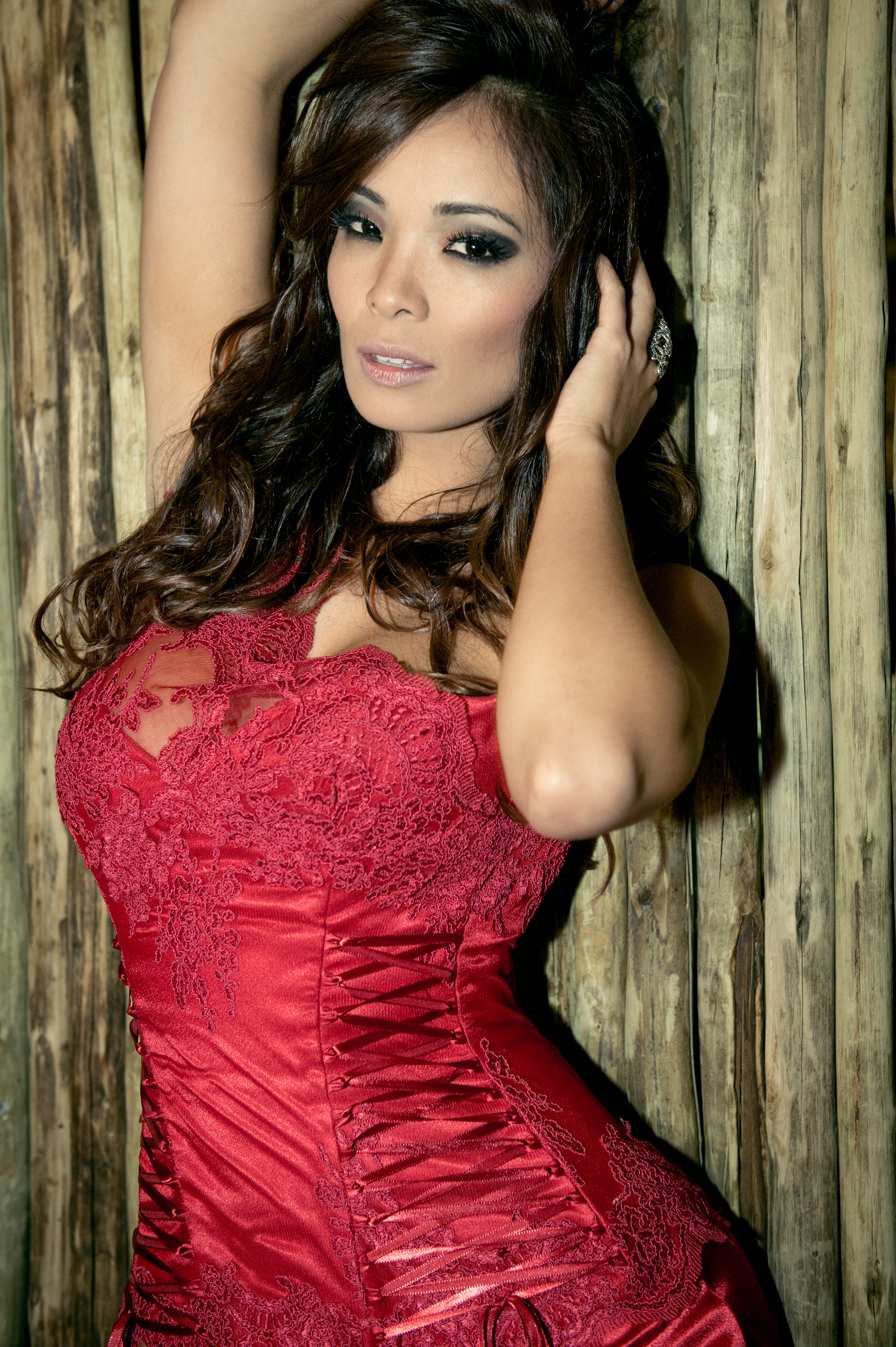
- Nakamura in 2014
- Born: Ana Carolina Soares Nakamura; May 9, 1983 (age 43); Rio de Janeiro, Brazil
- Occupations: Television presenter, actress, model, dancer
- Years active: 2004–present

Ana Carolina Soares "Carol" Nakamura (born 9 May 1983, in Rio de Janeiro) is a Brazilian dancer, actress, and television personality.

== Career ==
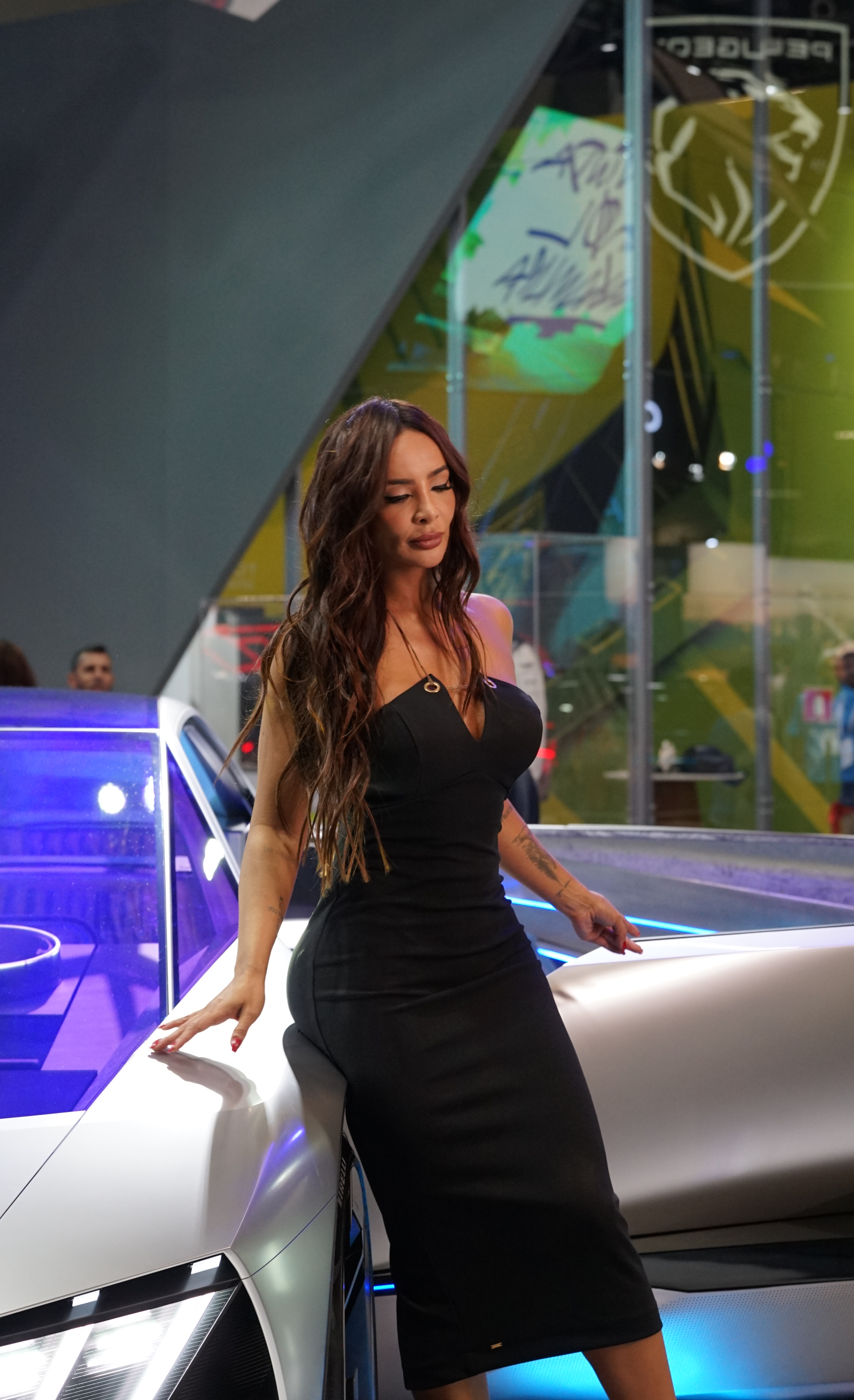
Nakamura at the 2025 Salão do Automóvel Peugeot exhibit

For twelve years, Nakamura was a member of the popular Brazilian television show Domingão do Faustão, on TV Globo. She started off in the mid-2000s as a ballet dancer in the show and eventually became one of the co-presenters with Fausto Silva. Nakamura left the show in April 2016 as she decided to shift her focus to acting. In September 2016, Nakamura returned to the show as a judge.

Nakamura starred as Hiromi in the Brazilian drama Sol Nascente, which contained a large sub-plot focused on Brazilian-Japanese society.

In addition to dancing and television, Nakamura is also a theater actor, taking part in several productions. She made her debut in a comedy in September 2017.

== Filmography ==
=== Television ===
Year	Title	Personality
2004–2016	Domingão do Faustão	Herself (dancer/co-presenter)
2015	Saltibum	Herself (Reality Show)
2016	Sol Nascente	Hiromi Tanaka (Hirô)
2023	No Limite	Herself (Reality show)

=== Theater ===
Year	Title	Personality
2009	A Bela e a Fera	Bela
2012	Pista Falsa	
2016	Paixão de Cristo	Maria

== Personal life ==
Nakamura, of Japanese descent, says that she experienced some ridicule and bullying in her youth because of her Asian heritage. Nakamura became a mother at the age of 16.

From 2014 to 2017, she has been in a relationship with Brazilian footballer Aislan. The two did eventually get engaged in January 2017.

In June 2017, the actress and her then eighteen-year-old son Juan Nakamura drew public attention during an appearance together at a shopping mall, where observers mistook the mother and son for a couple.

In October 2017, Nakamura broke up with Aislan and called the wedding off.
