= No Limite 4 =

- Season 4
- Presented by: Zeca Camargo
- No. of days: 62
- No. of castaways: 23
- Winner: Luciana de Araújo
- Runner-up: Gabriela Costa
- Location: Trairi, Ceará, Brazil
- No. of episodes: 18

Release
- Original release: July 30 – September 27, 2009

Additional information
- Filming dates: July 28 – September 27, 2009

Season chronology
- ← Previous; Mental Stage Next → Season 5

No Limite 4 (also known as No Limite: Ceará) is the fourth season of the Brazilian reality show No Limite filmed in Trairi, Ceará, Brazil, location that was previously used for the first season. The premiere aired Thursday, July 30, 2009.

Nineteen contestants were chosen by the producers to participate in the show between July and September 2009. The last original contestant was chosen by the public vote, in a competition between two male contestants aired on July 26, 2009.

During the show, three new contestants entered on the game, replacing two female players who withdrew from the competition and one male player, who broke the rules and was expelled from the show.

The two initial tribes were Taiba and Manibu. On episode 9, the two teams merged into a tribe called Carnaúba. These three tribes were named after beaches located in Ceará.

For the first time, contestants were eliminated by public vote. On each "cycle" of the show, two members of the losing tribe faced each other in the "Tribal Council Battle" (one member chosen by other team members and the other member chosen by the current team leader), then the public would vote on the contestant they wanted out. Fifth episode onwards, this method was dropped, returning the show to its original format.

The season included a new twist that originally came from the American version called Exile Island, where one castaway from each tribe are banished for Exile Island for the time period between the immunity challenge and the Tribal Council.

While on Exile Island, each exiled castaway picked from one of two urns. One urn contained a clue to the Hidden Immunity Idol, while the other urn contained nothing.

This season creates the second ever all-female final two, first occurring in the first season, when all the final four contestants were women. The season also lasted 62 days, being the longest season ever in Survivor franchise.

The winner was 38-year-old Luciana de Araújo, a firefighter from Goiânia, Goiás. She defeated psychologist Gabriela Costa in a 6–4 vote at the live finale to take the R$500,000 prize.

== Contestants ==
List of No Limite 4 contestants
Contestant	Original Tribe	Merged Tribe	Finish
Eneida Diniz; 33, Belém, PA	Manibu		1st Voted Out; Day 6
Ronaldo Machado; 54, Belo Horizonte, MG	Taiba		2nd Voted Out; Day 10
Denise Oliveira; 27, Pato Branco, PR	Taiba		Left Competition; Day 11
Sibele Maciel; 24, Itajaí, SC	Taiba		Left Competition; Day 11
Luiz Nascimento; 35, Rio de Janeiro, RJ	Manibu		Ejected; Day 13
João Alves; 30, Rio de Janeiro, RJ	Manibu		3rd Voted Out; Day 13
Júlia Vasques; 26, São Paulo, SP	Manibu		4th Voted Out; Day 17
Marcelo "Cebola" Caminha; 31, Recife, PE	Manibu		5th Voted Out; Day 20
Isabel Oliveira; 23, Niterói, RJ	Taiba		6th Voted Out; Day 24
Bianca "Bia" Amaral; 24, Juiz de Fora, MG	Manibu		7th Voted Out; Day 27
Rafael "Rafão" Matos; 28, Belo Horizonte, MG	Manibu	Carnaúba	8th Voted Out; 1st Jury Member; Day 31
Taritza Puggina; 32, Porto Alegre, RS	Taiba	Carnaúba	9th Voted Out; 2nd Jury Member; Day 34
Felipe Lima; 27, Santos, SP	Manibu	Carnaúba	10th Voted Out; 3rd Jury Member; Day 38
Gilson Alves; 37, Porto Alegre, RS	Taiba	Carnaúba	11th Voted Out; 4th Jury Member; Day 41
Marcelo Gaya; 30, Porto Alegre, RS	Manibu	Carnaúba	12th Voted Out; 5th Jury Member; Day 45
Sandi Ribeiro; 29, Rio de Janeiro, RJ	Taiba	Carnaúba	13th Voted Out; 6th Jury Member; Day 48
Ana Maria "Índia" Soares; 30, Barreiras, BA	Taiba	Carnaúba	14th Voted Out; 7th Jury Member; Day 52
Marcelo "Guimarães"; 24, Itabuna, BA	Taiba	Carnaúba	15th Voted Out; 8th Jury Member; Day 55
Osmar Guesser; 31, Florianópolis, SC	Taiba	Carnaúba	16th Voted Out; 9th Jury Member; Day 59
Alexandre Loureiro; 29, Rio de Janeiro, RJ	Taiba	Carnaúba	17th Voted Out; 10th Jury Member; Day 61
Jéssica da Silva; 25, Jundiaí, SP	Manibu	Carnaúba	18th Voted Out; 11th Jury Member; Day 62
Gabriela Costa; 28, Juiz de Fora, MG	Taiba	Carnaúba	Runner-up; Day 62
Luciana de Araújo; 38, Goiânia, GO	Manibu	Carnaúba	Sole Survivor; Day 62

== The game ==
Episode	Airdate	Challenges		Leader	Tribal Council Battle		Exiled	Eliminated	Vote	Finish
Episode	Airdate	Reward	Immunity	Leader	Tribe	Leader	Exiled	Eliminated	Vote	Finish
1	30 July 2009	Taiba (Note: The challenge was Reward and Immunity.)		Rafão	Eneida	Bia	None	Eneida	8–1	1st Voted Out; Day 6
2	2 August 2009	Taiba	Manibu	Sandi	Ronaldo	Índia	None	Ronaldo	4–3–2	2nd Voted Out; Day 10
3	6 August 2009	Taiba	Taiba	Bia	João	Felipe	None	Denise	No; Vote	Left the Game; Day 11
3	6 August 2009	Taiba	Taiba	Bia	João	Felipe	None	Sibele	No; Vote	Left the Game; Day 11
3	6 August 2009	Taiba	Taiba	Bia	João	Felipe	None	Luiz	No; Vote	Disqualified; Day 13
3	6 August 2009	Taiba	Taiba	Bia	João	Felipe	None	João	4–3–1	3rd Voted Out; Day 13
4	9 August 2009	Manibu	Taiba	Júlia	Júlia	Luciana	None	Júlia	4–1–1	4th Voted Out; Day 17
5	13 August 2009	Manibu	None	Extinct			None	None	No Tribal Council	
5	13 August 2009	Manibu	None	Extinct			None	None	No Tribal Council	
6	16 August 2009	Manibu	Taiba	Extinct			Marcelo	Cebola	4–2–1	5th Voted Out; Day 20
6	16 August 2009	Manibu	Taiba	Extinct			Osmar	Cebola	4–2–1	5th Voted Out; Day 20
7	20 August 2009	Taiba	Manibu	Extinct			None	Isabel	8–1	6th Voted Out; Day 24
8	23 August 2009	Manibu	Taiba	Extinct			Felipe	Bia	3–3 (Note: The vote resulted in a tie. Per the rules, a second vote was held where the castaways involved in the tie would not vote and the remaining castaways could only vote for those who tied.)	7th Voted Out; Day 27
8	23 August 2009	Taiba	Taiba	Extinct			Gabriela	Bia	3–3	7th Voted Out; Day 27
9	27 August 2009	Taiba	Luciana	Extinct			None	Rafão	9–3–1	8th Voted Out; 1st Jury Member; Day 31
10	30 August 2009	None	Osmar	Extinct			Alexandre; Gilson	Taritza	7–4–1	9th Voted Out; 2nd Jury Member; Day 34
11	3 September 2009	None	Osmar	Extinct			None	Felipe	7–2–1–1	10th Voted Out; 3rd Jury Member; Day 38
12	6 September 2009	Gabriela; Gilson; Índia; Marcelo; Osmar	Sandi	Extinct			Guimarães; Luciana	Gilson	5–2–2–1	11th Voted Out; 4th Jury Member; Day 41
13	10 September 2009	Índia; Marcelo	Sandi	Extinct			None	Marcelo	5–3–1	12th Voted Out; 5th Jury Member; Day 45
14	13 September 2009	Guimarães; Jéssica; Luciana; Sandi	Jéssica	Extinct			Sandi; Osmar	Sandi	7–1	13th Voted Out; 6th Jury Member; Day 48
15	17 September 2009	Gabriela; Índia; Osmar	Alexandre	Extinct			None	Índia	4–2–1	14th Voted Out; 7th Jury Member; Day 52
16	20 September 2009	Guimarães [Alexandre]	Osmar	Extinct			Jéssica	Guimarães	3–2–1	15th Voted Out; 8th Jury Member; Day 55
17	24 September 2009	Osmar [Luciana]	Alexandre	Extinct			None	Osmar	3–2	16th Voted Out; 9th Jury Member; Day 59
18	27 September 2009	None	Gabriela; Jéssica	Extinct			None	Alexandre	2–0	17th Voted Out; 10th Jury Member; Day 61
18	27 September 2009	None	Gabriela	Extinct			None	Jéssica	1–0	18th Voted Out; 11th Jury Member; Day 62
18	27 September 2009	Jury Vote						Gabriela	6–5	Runner-Up
18	27 September 2009	Jury Vote						Luciana	6–5	Sole Survivor

== Voting history ==
	Original tribes											Merged tribe										
Episode	2	3	4				5	6	7	8		9	10	11	12	13	14	15	16	17	18	
Day	6	10	11		13		17	20	24	27		31	34	38	41	45	48	51	55	59	61	62
Tribe	Manibu	Taiba	Taiba		Manibu	Manibu	Manibu	Manibu	Taiba	Manibu		Carnaúba	Carnaúba	Carnaúba	Carnaúba	Carnaúba	Carnaúba	Carnaúba	Carnaúba	Carnaúba	Carnaúba	Carnaúba
Eliminated	Eneida	Ronaldo	Denise	Sibele	Luiz	João	Júlia	Cebola	Isabel	Tie (Note: The first Tribal Council vote resulted in a tie. Per the rules, a second vote was held where the castaways involved in the tie would not vote and the remaining castaways could only vote for those who tied.)	Bia	Rafão	Taritza	Felipe	Gilson	Marcelo	Sandi	Índia	Guimarães	Osmar	Alexandre	Jéssica
Vote	8-2	4-3-2	Quit (Note: No vote: Denise and Sibele chose to quit the game.)		Disqualified (Note: Luiz was disqualified because remedies were found inside his shoe, therefore no vote occurred for him removal from the game.)	4-3-1	4-1-1	4-2-1	8-1	3-3	4-0	9-3-1	7-4-1	7-2-1-1	5-2-2-1	5-3-1	7-1	4-2-1	3-2-1	3-2	2-0	1-0
Voter	Votes																					
Luciana	Eneida					Marcelo	Júlia	Marcelo		Felipe	Bia	Felipe	Felipe	Felipe	Gilson	Marcelo	Sandi	Índia	Guimarães	Osmar	None (Note: Alexandre and Luciana were not eligible to vote in the first round of voting, since as the only two non-immune contestants, their votes would automatically cancel each other out.)	None (Note: Jéssica and Luciana were not eligible to vote in the second round of voting, since as the only two non-immune contestants, their votes would automatically cancel each other out.)
Gabriela		Ronaldo							Isabel			Rafão	Felipe	Felipe	Marcelo	Marcelo	Sandi	Índia	Guimarães	Osmar	Alexandre	Jéssica
Jéssica	Eneida					Marcelo	Júlia	Cebola		Felipe	Bia	Felipe	Taritza	Felipe	Gilson	Marcelo	Sandi	Índia	Guimarães	Osmar	Alexandre	None
Alexandre		Ronaldo							Isabel			Rafão	Taritza	Jéssica	Gilson	Luciana	Sandi	Luciana	Gabriela	Gabriela	None	
Osmar		Gabriela							Isabel			Rafão	Jéssica	Felipe	Gabriela	Gabriela	Sandi	Índia	Luciana	Gabriela		
Guimarães		Sibele							Isabel			Rafão	Taritza	Felipe	Gilson	Marcelo	Sandi	Gabriela	Luciana			
Índia		Ronaldo							Isabel			Rafão	Taritza	Felipe	Luciana	Luciana	Sandi	Luciana				
Sandi		Índia							Isabel			Taritza	Taritza	Gabriela	Gilson	Marcelo	Índia					
Marcelo	Eneida					João	Júlia	Cebola		Bia	Bia	Rafão	Taritza	Luciana	Luciana	Luciana						
Gilson		Sibele							Isabel			Rafão	Felipe	Felipe	Marcelo							
Felipe	Eneida					João	Marcelo	Cebola		Bia	None (Note: Bia and Felipe were not eligible to vote in the second round of voting.)	Rafão	Taritza	Luciana								
Taritza									Isabel			Rafão	Felipe									
Rafão	Bia					Marcelo	Felipe	Cebola		Bia	Bia	Felipe										
Bia	Eneida					Felipe	Júlia	Marcelo		Felipe	None											
Isabel									Taritza													
Cebola								Bia														
Júlia	Eneida					João	Luciana															
João	Eneida					Felipe																
Luiz	Eneida					João																
Sibele		Ronaldo																				
Denise		Ronaldo																				
Ronaldo		Sibele																				
Eneida	Bia																					

Jury vote
Episode	18	
Day	63	
Finalist	Luciana	Gabriela
Votes	6–5	
Juror	Vote	
Jéssica	Yes	
Alexandre (Note: The jury votes were cast live. Luciana had the six votes required to win the competition, so Alexandre's vote was not needed. He stated he would have voted for Gabriela.)		Yes
Osmar	Yes	
Guimarães	Yes	
Índia	Yes	
Sandi	Yes	
Marcelo		Yes
Gilson		Yes
Felipe	Yes	
Taritza		Yes
Rafão		Yes
