= No Limite season 7 =

No Limite
- Season 7
- Presented by: Fernando Fernandes
- No. of days: 21
- No. of castaways: 15
- Winner: Dedé Macedo
- Runners-up: Raiana Bertoso; Yuri Fulý
- Location: Rio Negro, Amazonas, Brazil
- No. of episodes: 10

Release
- Original network: TV Globo
- Original release: July 18 – August 17, 2023

Additional information
- Filming dates: June 15 – July 7, 2023

Season chronology
- ← Previous; Season 6

No Limite: Amazônia is the seventh season of the Brazilian competitive reality television series No Limite, based on the international reality game show franchise Survivor, which premiered on Tuesday, July 18, 2023, at 10:30 / 9:30 p.m. (BRT / AMT) on TV Globo. An early 15-minute preview of the season aired on July 13.

The season was filmed in the Amazon rainforest, marking the first time No Limite has filmed there. Fernando Fernandes returned for his second season as the host.

On July 7, 2023, Dedé Macedo won the competition over runner-up Raiana Bertoso and third place finisher Yuri Fulý, thus becoming the show's first physical disabled person winner.

== Contestants ==
The contestants were revealed on July 4, 2023, during the commercial breaks of TV Globo. This season's cast includes four celebrities (Carol Nakamura, Claudio Heinrich, Mônica Carvalho and Paulo Vilhena) and season 1 runner-up Pipa Diniz. The players were split into two original tribes, Jenipapo and Urucum, named after fruits from the region.

List of No Limite: Amazônia contestants
Contestant	Original Tribe	Switched Tribe	Merged Tribe	Finish	Ocuīride
Mônica Carvalho; 52, Nova Iguaçu, RJ	Urucum			1st voted out Day 2	
Patrícia "Pipa" Diniz; 52, Porto Alegre, RS; No Limite 1	Jenipapo			2nd voted out Day 4	
Simoni Santos; 37, Porto Alegre, RS	Jenipapo	Jenipapo		3rd voted out Day 7	Lost challenge 1st jury member Day 16
Paulo Vilhena; 44, Santos, SP	Urucum	Urucum		4th voted out Day 9	Quit; Day 9
Dedé Macedo (Returned to game)	Jenipapo	Jenipapo		5th voted out Day 9	Returned; Day 16
Guilherme Holanda; 27, Rio de Janeiro, RJ	Jenipapo	Jenipapo	Ananeco	6th voted out Day 12	Lost challenge 2nd jury member Day 16
Cláudio Heinrich; 50, Rio de Janeiro, RJ	Urucum	Jenipapo	Ananeco	7th voted out Day 14	Lost challenge 3rd jury member Day 16
Amanda Momente; 34, Rolândia, PR	Jenipapo	Jenipapo	Ananeco	8th voted out Day 15	Lost challenge 4th jury member Day 16
Marcus Vinicius Costa; 24, Trindade, GO	Jenipapo	Jenipapo	Ananeco	9th voted out 5th jury member Day 17	
Euclides Viana; 37, Mortugaba, BA	Jenipapo	Jenipapo	Ananeco	10th voted out 6th jury member Day 19	
Paulinha Vecchi; 30, São Paulo, SP	Urucum	Urucum	Ananeco	11th voted out 7th jury member Day 19	
Carol Nakamura; 40, Rio de Janeiro, RJ	Jenipapo	Urucum	Ananeco	Eliminated; Day 20	
Greiciene "Greici" Dias; 32, Queimados, RJ	Urucum	Urucum	Ananeco	Eliminated; Day 20	
Yuri Fulý; 25, Rio de Janeiro, RJ	Urucum	Urucum	Ananeco	2nd Runner-up; Day 21	
Raiana Bertoso; 30, Salvador, BA	Urucum	Urucum	Ananeco	Runner-up; Day 21	
Dedé Macedo; 45, Valinhos, SP	Jenipapo	Jenipapo	Ananeco	Sole Survivor; Day 21	

== Future Appearances ==
In 2024, Marcus Vinicius Costa appeared on A Grande Conquista 2, he had to compete for a place to enter in the game and he didn't enter.

== Season summary ==
Challenge winners and eliminations by episodes
Episode			Challenge winner(s)		Eliminated	Result
No.	Title	Air date	Reward	Immunity	Eliminated	Result
1	"A Floresta" "The Forest"	18 July 2023	Jenipapo	Jenipapo	Mônica	1st voted out Day 2
2	"A Traição" "The Betrayal"	20 July 2023	Jenipapo	Urucum	Pipa	2nd voted out Day 4
3	"A Expulsão" "The Expulsion"	25 July 2023	Jenipapo	Urucum	Simoni	3rd voted out Day 7
4	"Jogada de Mestre" "Masterstroke"	27 July 2023	Guilherme [Euclides, Marcus]	Carol	Paulo	4th voted out Day 9
4	"Jogada de Mestre" "Masterstroke"	27 July 2023	Guilherme [Euclides, Marcus]	Guilherme	Dedé	5th voted out Day 9
5	"Jogo Duplo" "Double Game"	1 August 2023	Euclides, Fulý, Greiciene	Greiciene	Guilherme	6th voted out Day 12
6	"Duelo de Fogo" "Fire Duel"	3 August 2023	Carol, Claudio, Paulinha, Raiana	Greiciene	Claudio	7th voted out Day 14
7	"Uma Nova Chance" "A New Chance"	8 August 2023	Paulinha [Fulý]	Paulinha	Amanda	8th voted out Day 15
8	"Desafio da Comida" "Food Challenge"	10 August 2023	Euclides, Marcus [Fulý]	Euclides	Marcus	9th voted out Day 17
9	"Fogo Amigo" "Friendly Fire"	15 August 2023	Carol [Dedé, Greiciene]	Carol	Euclides	10th voted out Day 19
9	"Fogo Amigo" "Friendly Fire"	15 August 2023	Carol [Dedé, Greiciene]	Carol	Paulinha	11th voted out Day 19

== Voting history ==
	Original Tribes		Switched Tribes				Merged Tribe													
Episode #	1	2	3		4		5	6		7	8	9			10					
Day #	2	4	7		9		12	14		15	17	19			19	20		21		
Eliminated	Mônica	Pipa	Simoni		Paulo	Dedé	Guilherme	Claudio (Note: The voting was held to determine the castaway who would duel in a fire-making challenge along with Paulinha, who was the loser of the Immunity Challenge.)	Claudio	Amanda	Marcus	Euclides	Tie (Note: The vote resulted in a tie. Per the rules, a second vote was held where the castaways involved in the tie would not vote and the remaining castaways could only vote for those who tied.)	Paulinha	Raiana	Carol	Greiciene	Fulý	Raiana	Dedé
Votes	6–1	5–3	6–2 (Note: Simoni played the extra vote advantage, allowing her to cast two ballots on Amanda.)		1–0 (Note: Paulo played a hidden immunity idol on Fulý; therefore, five votes cast against him did not count.)	4–1–1–1	6–4 (Note: Marcus played a hidden immunity idol on himself; however, no votes were cast against him.)	5–2–1	Challenge (Note: Claudio lost the fire-making challenge. Therefore, he was eliminated from game.)	7–1	6–1–1	5–2	3–3	3–1	3–2–2	Challenge		Final Trial		
Castaway	Vote																			
Dedé		Pipa	Simoni			Marcus					Marcus	Fulý	Paulinha	None (Note: Dedé and Paulinha were ineligible to vote in the second round of voting, as they were the two tied contestants and could not participate in the decision.)	None	Won		Sole Survivor		
Raiana	Mônica				~~Fulý~~		Guilherme	Claudio	Saved	Amanda	Marcus	Euclides	Dedé	Dedé	None	Immune		Runner-up		
Fulý	Mônica				Paulo		Guilherme	Claudio	Saved	Amanda	Marcus	Euclides	Paulinha	Paulinha	None	Won		2nd runner-up		
Greiciene	Mônica				~~Fulý~~		Guilherme	Amanda	Immune	Amanda	Marcus	Euclides	Dedé	Paulinha	None	Eliminated				
Carol		Guilherme			~~Fulý~~		Guilherme	Claudio	Saved	Amanda	Marcus	Euclides	Paulinha	Paulinha	None	Eliminated				
Paulinha	Mônica				~~Fulý~~		Guilherme	Claudio	Won	Amanda	Marcus	Euclides	Dedé	None	Raiana					
Euclides		Pipa	Simoni			Dedé	Claudio	Carol	Saved	Amanda	Greiciene	Fulý			Raiana					
Marcus		Pipa	Simoni			Dedé	Claudio	Claudio	Saved	Amanda	Paulinha				Raiana					
Amanda		Pipa	Simoni			Dedé	Claudio	None (Note: Greiciene played the nullify vote advantage on Amanda. Therefore, Amanda lost the right to cast her vote.)	Saved	Euclides					Carol					
Claudio	Mônica		Simoni (Note: Claudio was immune this voting.)			Euclides	Guilherme	Carol	Eliminated						Greiciene					
Guilherme		Pipa	Simoni			Dedé	Claudio								Greiciene					
Paulo	Mônica				~~Fulý~~															
Simoni		Guilherme	Amanda	Amanda		Amanda (Note: Simoni played a revenge vote advantage, allowing her to cast a vote on a castaway of the old tribe in the next vote the tribe faces, even eliminated from the game. This revenge vote was made effective on Amanda in the following episode.)									Carol					
Pipa		Guilherme																		
Mônica	Greiciene																			

== Ratings and reception ==
=== Brazilian ratings ===
All numbers are in points and provided by Kantar Ibope Media.

Episode	Air date	Timeslot (BRT)	SP viewers (in points)	Source
0	July 13, 2023	Thursday 11:00 p.m.	12.2	
1	July 18, 2023	Tuesday 10:30 p.m.	14.0	
2	July 20, 2023	Thursday 10:30 p.m.	15.8	
3	July 25, 2023	Tuesday 10:30 p.m.	15.1	
4	July 27, 2023	Thursday 10:30 p.m.	16.4	
5	August 1, 2023	Tuesday 10:30 p.m.	13.7	
6	August 3, 2023	Thursday 10:30 p.m.	15.8	
7	August 8, 2023	Tuesday 10:30 p.m.	14.1	
8	August 10, 2023	Thursday 10:30 p.m.	15.1	
9	August 15, 2023	Tuesday 10:30 p.m.	15.2	
10	August 17, 2023	Thursday 10:30 p.m.	15.9	

- In 2023, each point represents 268.083 households in 15 market cities in Brazil (76.953 households in São Paulo).
