= No Limite season 1 =

No Limite
- Season 1
- No. of days: 23
- No. of castaways: 12
- Winner: Elaine de Melo
- Runner-up: Pipa Diniz
- Location: Aquiraz, Ceará, Brazil
- No. of episodes: 8

Release
- Original release: July 23 – September 10, 2000

Season chronology
- Next → Season 2

The first season of the Brazilian competitive reality television series No Limite, based on the international reality game show franchise Survivor, premiered on Sunday, July 23, 2000 at 11:00 p.m. / 10:00 p.m. (BRT / AMT) on TV Globo.

Twelve contestants were chosen by the producers to participate the show in July 2000. The two initial tribes were Sol (Sun) and Lua (Moon). On episode 6, the two teams merged into a tribe called Solua, named for a combination of two tribes.

On the season finale, the second-to-last immunity challenge divided the players in two teams. The winning team (Elaine and Pipa) advanced for the finals, while the losing team (Andréa and Juliana) was automatically eliminated.

The final two faced off for the final immunity challenge, which was an extremely grueling, multi-part challenge, and the most elaborate challenge of the entire season, often combining elements from previous challenges.

This season creates the first ever all-female final two, with all the final four contestants being women. This fact was repeated only eight years later in Survivor: Micronesia.

The winner was 35-year-old Elaine de Melo, a hairdresser from São Paulo, São Paulo. She defeated graphic producer Patrícia "Pipa" Diniz at the final challenge and took home the R$300.000 prize. The final result was leaked on August 16, 2000, by the brazilian newspaper Extra (also owned by Grupo Globo).

== Contestants ==
List of No Limite (season 1) contestants
Contestant	Original Tribe	Merged Tribe	Finish
Hilca Maria; 21, Rio de Janeiro, RJ	Sol		1st Voted Out; Day 3
Paulo César "Amendoim" Martins; 42, Rio de Janeiro, RJ	Sol		2nd Voted Out; Day 6
Marcus Werner; 27, Rio de Janeiro, RJ	Sol		3rd Voted Out; Day 9
Francisco "Chico" Salles; 51, São Paulo, SP	Lua		4th Voted Out; Day 12
Ilma Arakawa; 54, São Paulo, SP	Sol		5th Voted Out; Day 15
Jeferson Schmengler; 31, Porto Alegre, RS	Lua	Solua	6th Voted Out; Day 18
Vanderson Souza; 20, Rio de Janeiro, RJ	Lua	Solua	7th Voted Out; Day 21
Thiago Toqueton; 20, São Paulo, SP	Sol	Solua	8th Voted Out; Day 21
Juliana Marques; 23, São Paulo, SP	Lua	Solua	Eliminated; Day 22
Andréa Baptista; 29, São Paulo, SP	Lua	Solua	Eliminated; Day 22
Patrícia "Pipa" Diniz; 29, Porto Alegre, RS	Sol	Solua	Runner-up; Day 23
Elaine de Melo; 35, São Paulo, SP	Lua	Solua	Sole Survivor; Day 23

== Future Appearances ==
Patrícia "Pipa" Diniz later returned to compete in No Limite: Amazônia, she finished in 14th place in the competition.

== Season summary ==
Challenge winners and eliminations by episodes
Episode		Challenge winner(s)		Eliminated	Finish
No.	Air date	Reward	Immunity	Eliminated	Finish
1	23 July 2000	Lua	Lua	Hilca	1st Voted Out; Day 3
2	30 July 2000	Sol	Lua	Amendoim	2nd Voted Out; Day 6
3	6 August 2000	Sol	Lua	Marcus	3rd Voted Out; Day 9
4	13 August 2000	Sol	Sol	Chico	4th Voted Out; Day 12
5	20 August 2000	None	Lua	Ilma	5th Voted Out; Day 15
6	27 August 2000	Andréa		Jeferson	6th Voted Out; Day 18
7	3 September 2000	Elaine; Juliana; Pipa	Elaine; Juliana; Pipa	Vanderson	7th Voted Out; Day 21
7	3 September 2000	Elaine; Juliana; Pipa	Elaine; Juliana; Pipa	Thiago	8th Voted Out; Day 21
8	10 September 2000	None	Elaine; Pipa	Juliana	Eliminated; Day 22
8	10 September 2000	None	Elaine; Pipa	Andréa	Eliminated; Day 22
8	10 September 2000			Final Trial	
8	10 September 2000			Pipa	Runner-Up
8	10 September 2000			Elaine	Sole Survivor

== Voting history ==
	Original tribes						Merged tribe						
Episode	1	2	3	4		5	6	7		8			
Day	3	6	9	12		15	18	21		22		23	
Tribe	Sol	Sol	Sol	Lua		Sol	Solua	Solua	Solua	Solua		Solua	
Eliminated	Hilca	Amendoim	Marcus	Tie (Note: The vote resulted in a tie. Per the rules, a second vote was held where the castaways involved in the tie would not vote and the remaining castaways could only vote for those who tied.)	Chico	Ilma	Jeferson	Vanderson	Thiago	Juliana	Andréa	Pipa	Elaine
Vote	5-1	4-1	3-1	3-3	4-0	2-1	3-2-2	4-1-1	2-1	Challenge (Note: On Day 22, a challenge was held instead of a vote, where Andréa & Juliana and Elaine & Pipa were paired. The pair that lost the challenge would be eliminated.)		Final Trial	
Voter	Votes												
Elaine				Andréa	Chico		Vanderson	Vanderson	Thiago	Won		Sole Survivor	
Pipa	Hilca	Amendoim	Marcus			Ilma	Vanderson	Vanderson	Andréa	Won		Runner-up	
Andréa				Chico	None (Note: Andréa and Chico were not eligible to vote in the second round of voting.)		Jeferson	Vanderson	None (Note: Andréa and Thiago were not eligible to vote in the second round of voting, since as the only non-immune contestants, their votes would automatically cancel each other out.)	Lost			
Juliana				Chico	Chico		Jeferson	Vanderson	Thiago	Lost			
Thiago	Hilca	Amendoim	Marcus			Ilma	Jeferson	Andréa	None				
Vanderson				Andréa	Chico		Thiago	Thiago					
Jefferson				Chico	Chico		Thiago						
Ilma	Hilca	Amendoim	Marcus			Pipa							
Chico				Andréa	None								
Marcus	Hilca	Amendoim	Ilma										
Amendoim	Hilca	Ilma											
Hilca	Ilma												

== Ratings and reception ==
=== Brazilian ratings ===
All numbers are in points and provided by Kantar Ibope Media.

Episode	Air date	Timeslot (BRT)	SP viewers (in points)	Source
1	July 23, 2000	Sunday 11:00 p.m.	46.0	
2	July 30, 2000	Sunday 11:00 p.m.	45.0	
3	August 6, 2000	Sunday 11:00 p.m.	43.0	
4	August 13, 2000	Sunday 11:00 p.m.	48.0	
5	August 20, 2000	Sunday 11:00 p.m.	48.0	
6	August 27, 2000	Sunday 11:00 p.m.	43.0	
7	September 3, 2000	Sunday 11:00 p.m.	52.0	
8	September 10, 2000	Sunday 11:00 p.m.	50.0	

- In 2000, each point represents 80,000 households in São Paulo.
