= No Limite 3 =

- Season 3
- Presented by: Zeca Camargo
- No. of days: 24
- No. of castaways: 12
- Winner: Rodrigo Tigueiro
- Runner-up: Hérica Sanfelice
- Location: Marajó Island, Pará, Brazil
- No. of episodes: 8

Release
- Original release: 28 October – 23 December 2001

Additional information
- Filming dates: October 2001 – November 2001

Season chronology
- ← Previous; Season 2 Next → Season 4

No Limite 3 is the third season of the Brazilian reality show No Limite filmed at Marajó Island, Pará, Brazil. The premiere aired Sunday, 28 October 2001.

Twelve contestants were chosen by the producers to participate on the show between October and November 2001. The two initial tribes were Água (Water) and Fogo (Fire). On episode 6, the two teams merged into a tribe called Foguágua, named for a combination of the two tribes.

On the season finale, the second-to-last immunity challenge divided the players in two teams. The winning team (Hérica and Tatiana) advanced to the finals, while the losing team (Adriana and Peterson) was automatically eliminated.

However, the last six eliminated players before the final two (Cláudia, Diuare, Fábio, Rodrigo, Peterson and Adriana) returned to compete in a special challenge. The winning player (Rodrigo) returned to the game as the third and final member of the Final Three.

The Final Three faced off in a final immunity challenge, which was an extremely grueling, multi-part challenge, and the most elaborate challenge of the entire season, often combining elements from previous challenges.

Weeks later, on 23 December 2001, live from Rio de Janeiro, police officer Rodrigo Trigueiro was announced as the winner of the competition, winning R$300,000 and a brand new car. Runner-up triathlete and model Hérica Sanfelice won R$50,000, and the third-place finisher, student Tatiana Welikson, won R$25,000.

== Contestants ==
List of No Limite 3 contestants
Contestant	Original Tribe	Merged Tribe	Voted Out	Vale dos Exilados
Tânia Bisteka; 28, Rio de Janeiro, RJ	Água		1st Voted Out; Day 3	
Rogério ? 48, Campo Grande, MS	Fogo		2nd Voted Out; Day 6	
Janaína ? 20, São Paulo, SP	Fogo		3rd Voted Out; Day 9	
Pedro Ribeiro; 35, Rio de Janeiro, RJ	Água		4th Voted Out; Day 12	
Cláudia Lúcia; 36, São Paulo, SP	Fogo		5th voted out Day 15	Lost Challenge; Day 23
Diuare de Carvalho; 28, Rio de Janeiro, RJ	Fogo	Foguágua	6th Voted Out; Day 18	Lost Challenge; Day 23
Fábio Meirelles; 23, Rio de Janeiro, RJ	Fogo	Foguágua	7th Voted Out; Day 21	Lost Challenge; Day 23
Rodrigo Trigueiro; Returned to Game	Água	Foguágua	8th Voted Out; Day 22	Returned; Day 23
Peterson ? 25, São Paulo, SP	Água	Foguágua	Eliminated; Day 23	Lost Challenge; Day 23
Adriana ? 28, Rio de Janeiro, RJ	Água	Foguágua	Eliminated; Day 23	Lost Challenge; Day 23
Tatiana Welikson; 24, Rio de Janeiro, RJ	Fogo	Foguágua	2nd Runner-up; Day 24	
Hérica Sanfelice; 24, São Paulo, SP	Água	Foguágua	Runner-up; Day 24	
Rodrigo Trigueiro; 34, Natal, RN	Água	Foguágua	Sole Survivor; Day 24	

== The game ==
Episode	Airdate	Vale dos Exilados departures	Challenges		Eliminated	Vote	Finish
Episode	Airdate	Vale dos Exilados departures	Reward	Immunity	Eliminated	Vote	Finish
1	28 October 2001		Água	Fogo	Bisteka	3–2–1	1st Voted Out; Day 3
2	4 November 2001		Água	Água	Rogério	3–2–1	2nd Voted Out; Day 6
3	11 November 2001		Água	Água	Janaína	4–1	3rd Voted Out; Day 9
4	18 November 2001		Fogo	Fogo	Pedro	3–2	4th Voted Out; Day 12
5	25 November 2001		Água	Água	Cláudia	3–1	5th Voted Out; Day 15
6	2 December 2001	None	Rodrigo	Hérica	Diuare	4–2–1	6th Voted Out; Day 18
7	9 December 2001	None	Peterson		Fábio	3–1–1–1	7th Voted Out; Day 21
7	9 December 2001	None	Adriana		Rodrigo	4–1	8th Voted Out; Day 22
8	16 December 2001	None	None	Hérica; Tatiana	Peterson	No; Vote	Eliminated; Day 23
8	16 December 2001	None	None	Hérica; Tatiana	Adriana	No; Vote	Eliminated; Day 23
9	23 December 2001	Adriana; Cláudia; Diuare; Fábio; Peterson (Note: Permanently eliminated from the game upon losing the Vale dos Exilados challenge.)	Rodrigo (Note: Returned to the game upon winning Vale dos Exilados challenge.)		None	No Tribal Council	
9	23 December 2001		Final Trial		Tatiana	No; Vote	Third Place
9	23 December 2001		Final Trial		Hérica	No; Vote	Runner-Up
9	23 December 2001		Final Trial		Rodrigo	No; Vote	Sole Survivor

== Voting history ==
	Original tribes					Merged tribe							
Episode	1	2	3	4	5	6	7		8		9		
Day	3	6	9	12	15	18	21	22	23		24		
Tribe	Água	Fogo	Fogo	Água	Fogo	Foguágua	Foguágua	Foguágua	Foguágua		Foguágua		
Eliminated	Bisteka	Rogério	Janaína	Pedro	Cláudia	Diuare	Fábio	Rodrigo	Peterson	Adriana	Tatiana	Hérica	Rodrigo
Vote	3-2-1	3-2-1	4-1	3-2	3-1	4-2-1	3-1-1-1	4-1	Challenge		Final Trial		
Voter	Votes												
Rodrigo	Bisteka			Adriana		Peterson	Tatiana	Tatiana			Sole Survivor		
Hérica	Adriana			Pedro		Diuare	Fábio	Rodrigo	Won		Runner-up		
Tatiana		Rogério	Janaína		Cláudia	Peterson	Rodrigo	Rodrigo	Won		2nd runner-up		
Adriana	Hérica			Pedro		Diuare	Fábio	Rodrigo	Lost				
Peterson	Bisteka			Pedro		Diuare	Fábio	Rodrigo	Lost				
Fábio		Janaína	Janaína		Cláudia	Diuare	Hérica						
Diuare		Janaína	Janaína		Cláudia	Adriana							
Cláudia		Rogério	Janaína		Tatiana								
Pedro	Bisteka			Adriana									
Janaína		Rogério	Cláudia										
Rogério		Tatiana											
Bisteka	Adriana												
