= No Limite 2 =

- Season 2
- Presented by: Zeca Camargo
- No. of days: 24
- No. of castaways: 12
- Winner: Léo Rassi
- Runner-up: Christina Moreira
- Location: Chapada dos Guimarães, Mato Grosso, Brazil
- No. of episodes: 8

Release
- Original release: January 28 – March 25, 2001

Additional information
- Filming dates: January 2001 – February 2001

Season chronology
- ← Previous; Season 1 Next → Mental Stage

No Limite 2 is the second season of the Brazilian reality show No Limite filmed in Chapada dos Guimarães, Mato Grosso, Brazil. The premiere aired Sunday, 28 January 2001.

Twelve contestants were chosen by the producers to participate the show between January and February 2001.

The two initial tribes were Araras Vermelhas and Lobos Guarás. On episode 5, the two teams merged into a tribe called Araguará, named for a combination of two tribes.

In the season finale, the four remaining players competed in the second-to-last immunity challenge, who was an endurance challenge.

At the Tribal Council, only Léo (the winning player) secured his spot on the Final Two. The tribemates voted Dada out of their tribe.

Later a special jury (made of the last four eliminated players before the final four: Sônia, Sávio, Rosa and Eliane) voted Danilo out, leaving Léo and Christina as the finalists.

The Final Two faced off for the final immunity challenge, which was an extremely grueling, multi-part challenge, and the most elaborate challenge of the entire season, often combining elements from previous challenges.

Weeks later, on 25 March 2001, live from Rio de Janeiro, student Léo Rassi was announced as the winner of the competition. He won R$300,000 and a brand-new car, while runner-up Christina Moreira won R$50,000.

== Contestants ==
List of No Limite 2 contestants
Contestant	Original Tribe	Merged Tribe	Finish
Leon Ramos; 25, Recife, PE	Lobos Guarás		1st Voted Out; Day 3
Roberta Mayanah; 25, Recife, PE	Araras Vermelhas		2nd Voted Out; Day 6
Antero Temoteo; 44, Fortaleza, CE	Lobos Guarás		3rd Voted Out; Day 9
Lhitts Maciel; 23, Brasília, DF	Lobos Guarás		Ejected; Day 12
Sônia Cerqueira; 34, São Paulo, SP	Araras Vermelhas		4th Voted Out; 1st Jury Member; Day 15
Sávio Clemente; 25, Curitiba, PR	Lobos Guarás	Araguará	5th Voted Out; 2nd Jury Member; Day 18
Rosa ? 42, Belo Horizonte, MG	Araras Vermelhas	Araguará	6th Voted Out; 3rd Jury Member; Day 21
Eliane Menezes; 30, Curitiba, PR	Lobos Guarás	Araguará	7th Voted Out; 4th Jury Member; Day 22
Dadá ? 18, Rio de Janeiro, RJ	Araras Vermelhas	Araguará	8th Voted Out; Day 23
Danilo Prates; 21, Montes Claros, MG	Araras Vermelhas	Araguará	9th Voted Out; Day 23
Christina Moreira; 27, São Paulo, SP	Lobos Guarás	Araguará	Runner-up; Day 24
Leonardo "Léo" Rassi; 23, Goiânia, GO	Araras Vermelhas	Araguará	Sole Survivor; Day 24

== The game ==
Episode	Airdate	Challenges		Eliminated	Vote	Finish
Episode	Airdate	Reward	Immunity	Eliminated	Vote	Finish
1	28 January 2001	Araras Vermelhas	Araras Vermelhas	Leon	2–2–2 (Note: The vote resulted in a tie. Per the rules, a second vote was held where the castaways involved in the tie would not vote and the remaining castaways could only vote for those who tied.)	1st Voted Out; Day 3
2	4 February 2001	Araras Vermelhas	Lobos Guarás	Roberta	3–1–1–1	2nd Voted Out; Day 6
3	11 February 2001	Araras Vermelhas	Araras Vermelhas	Antero	4–1	3rd Voted Out; Day 9
4	18 February 2001	None	Lobos Guarás	Lhitts	No; Vote	Disqualified; Day 12
4	18 February 2001	None	Lobos Guarás	Sônia	3–1–1	4th Voted Out; 1st Jury Member; Day 15
5	4 March 2001	Danilo	Danilo	Sávio	4–2–1	5th Voted Out; 2nd Jury Member; Day 18
6	11 March 2001	Léo	Léo	Rosa	3–2–1	6th Voted Out; 3rd Jury Member; Day 21
6	11 March 2001	Léo	Eliane	Rosa	3–2–1	6th Voted Out; 3rd Jury Member; Day 21
7	18 March 2001	Dada	Danilo	Eliane	3–2	7th Voted Out; 4th Jury Member; Day 22
7	18 March 2001	Danilo	Dada	Eliane	3–2	7th Voted Out; 4th Jury Member; Day 22
8	25 March 2001	None	Léo	Dada	2–2 (Note: The vote resulted in a tie. Per the rules, at a tie after the merge, a second vote was held where the castaways would not vote and the jury could only vote for those who tied.)	8th Voted Out; Day 23
8	25 March 2001	None	Léo	Danilo	3–1	9th Voted Out; Day 23
8	25 March 2001	Final Trial		Christina	No; Vote	Runner-Up
8	25 March 2001	Final Trial		Léo	No; Vote	Sole Survivor

== Voting history ==
	Original tribes						Merged tribe							
Episode	1		2	3	4		5	6	7	8				
Day	3		6	9	12	15	18	21	22	23			24	
Tribe	Lobos; Guarás		Araras; Vermelhas	Lobos; Guarás	Lobos; Guarás	Araras; Vermelhas	Araguará	Araguará	Araguará	Araguará		Araguará	Araguará	
Eliminated	Tie (Note: The first Tribal Council vote resulted in a tie. Per the rules, a second vote was held where the castaways involved in the tie would not vote and the remaining castaways could only vote for those who tied.)	Leon	Roberta	Antero	Lhitts	Sônia	Sávio	Rosa	Elaine	Tie (Note: The vote resulted in a tie. Per the rules, at a tie after the merge, a second vote was held where the castaways would not vote and the jury could only vote for those who tied.)	Dáda	Danilo	Christina	Léo
Vote	2–2–2	3–0	3-1-1-1	4–1	Disqualified (Note: Lhitts was disqualified for leaving the Lobos Guarás tribe's camp, therefore no vote occurred and she was removed from the game.)	3–1–1	4–2–1	3–2–1	3–2	2-2	4–0	3–1	Final Trial	
Voter	Votes													
Léo			Roberta			Sônia	Sávio	Rosa	Elaine	Dáda	None (Note: Christina, Dada, Danilo and Léo were not eligible to vote in the second round of voting.)	None (Note: The remaining castaways were not eligible to vote in the third round of voting, since there were only two non-immunes contestants, their votes would automatically cancelled each other out.)	Sole Survivor	
Christina	Elaine	None (Note: Christina, Elaine and Leon were not eligible to vote in the second round of voting)		Antero			Léo	Danilo	Léo	Danilo	None	None	Runner-up	
Danilo			Roberta			Sônia	Sávio	Christina	Elaine	Dáda	None	None		
Dáda			Roberta			Léo	Sávio	Rosa	Elaine	Danilo	None			
Elaine	Christina	None		Antero			Léo	Rosa	Léo		Dáda	Danilo		
Rosa			Sônia			Sônia	Sávio	Christina			Dáda	Danilo		
Sávio	Christina	Leon		Antero			Elaine				Dáda	Christina		
Sônia			Danilo			Danilo					Dáda	Danilo		
Lhitts	Leon	Leon		Antero										
Antero	Leon	Leon		Christina										
Roberta			Léo											
Leon	Ellaine	None												
