= Mundaú =

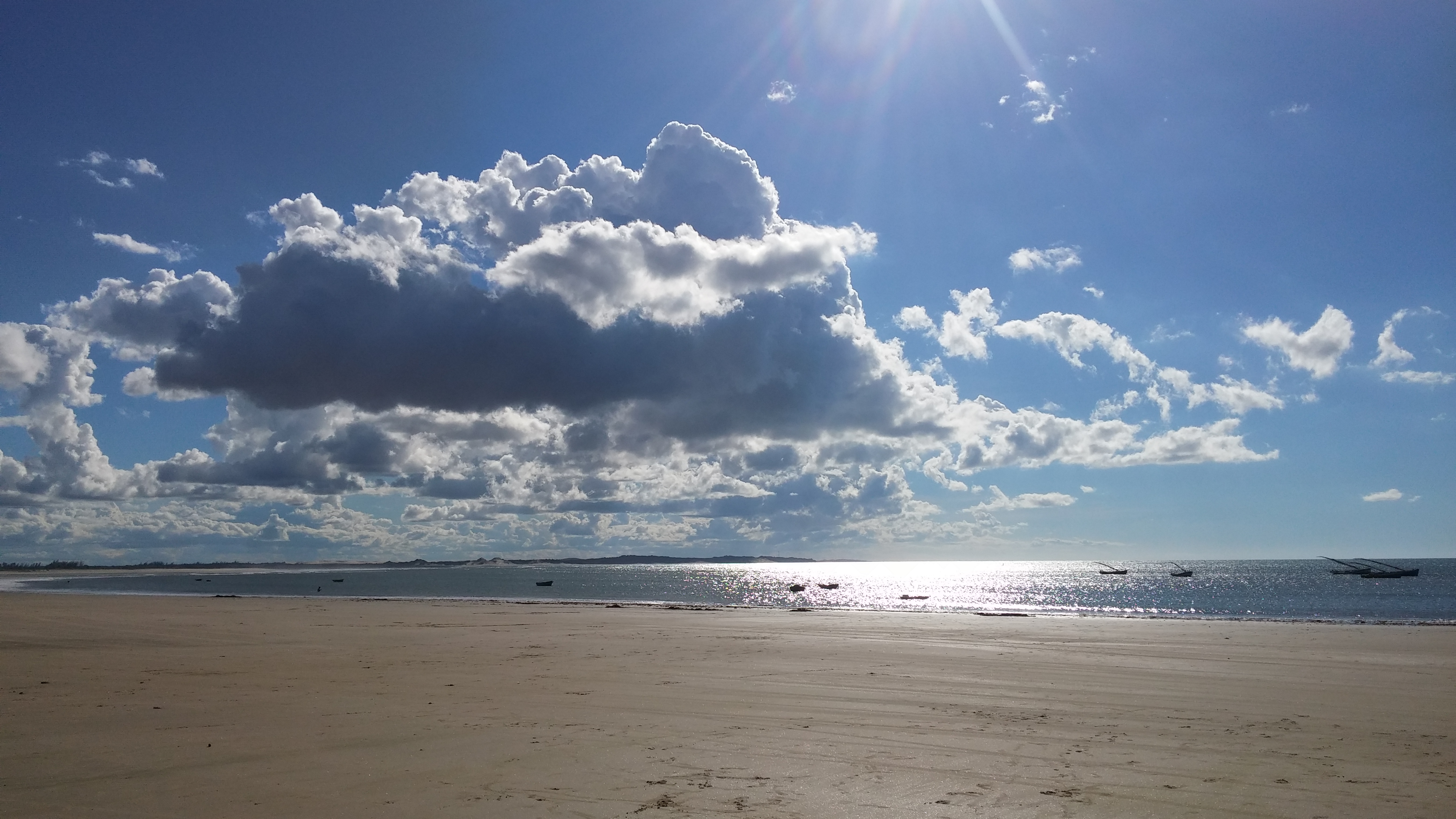
Mundaú CE - Praia deserta e ensolarada.jpg

Mundaú is a village in the municipality of Trairi in the state of Ceará. It is located 130 or so kilometres from the state capital Fortaleza.

== Nature ==
Most of Mundaú's original vegetation is still intact. The east and south of the village contain many palm trees, sugar cane, banana plants, castanholas, mango trees, guajiru, and cashew trees. In the dunes there is no vegetation, only cows and donkeys walking around. Mundaú is famous for lying by the mouth of the Mundaú River. Besides this river there are dense mangrove forests. The river flows from Trairi.

== Fishing ==
Fishing is the main source of income for the people of Mundaú. All the men sail the sea on jangadas which are rather small and simplistic. These courageous men used to sail 200 kilometres, being away for a week. Nowadays a mere 50 kilometres is travelled to get lobsters and camurupim

Despite the small size of the ships (10 by 4 feet) there are hardly any accidents, but if they happen heroic tales are dragged out of them that are to be told for many years. The accidents usually involve the gigantic waves caught by tankers. The tankers couldn't see the fishermen since they didn't carry any lights. These accidents don't really happen anymore because the fishermen don't sail out that far anymore and now can take safe lights.

Because of the river, Mundaú has a natural harbour which enables fishermen to also use larger boats that can take more fish.
