= Guajiru =

Coordinates: 3.23697°S 39.23716°W

Guajiru is a village on the coast of the Brazilian state of Ceará. It is part of the district of Flecheiras in the municipality of Trairi and is about a 130 km drive from the state capital Fortaleza.

Guajiru is a Tupi name for the coco plum that grows in abundance in this area.

== Population ==
Guajiru had 958 inhabitants as of 2022. Almost 700 of those identified as pardo. "Panorama do Censo 2022".

== History ==
Archaeological evidence suggests human presence in the area dating back at to at least 3460 BCE. Before wind turbines were constructed in the 2010s, several archaeological sites were discovered within 1 km of what is now Guajiru. Researchers uncovered signs of fishing, fire usage, and prehistoric weaponry.

The Tremembé indigenous group historically inhabited the coastline of Ceará including the area between the Trairi and Mundaú river estuaries. During the Dutch incursions along the coast, they retreated from the beaches to the dunes, establishing the settlement of Curimãs, among others, located a few kilometers from Guajiru. They continued to use Guajiru beach, then known as Flecheirinha, for fishing.

Towards the end of the 19th century and the beginning of the 20th century, Guajiru was permanently resettled and the modern village emerged. Today, many Guajiru residents maintain family connections in Curimãs, and many own land between the dunes and Curimãs. In 2021, the first road linking the two was constructed.

Electricity arrived the 1980s and in the 1990s the first road linking Guajiru to the outside world was constructed.

== Fishing ==
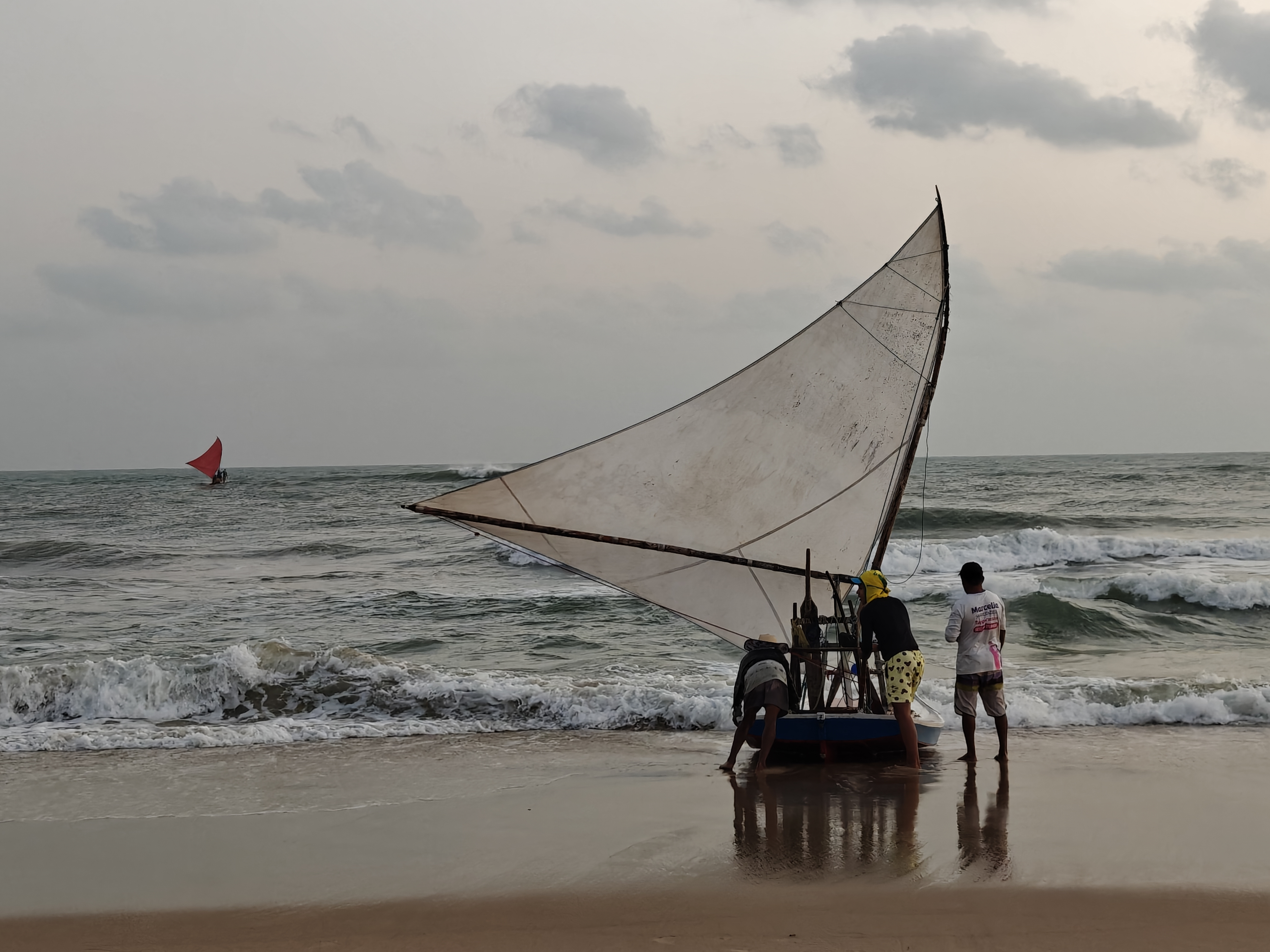
Three fishermen leaving on a jangada at dawn

Fishing is the main source of income for the people of Guajiru. Fishermen use the traditional jangada for their activities.

In 2009, 40% of the population was directly depended on fishing and 90% was indirectly depended.

== Tourism ==
The strong winds and stable trade winds make perfect conditions for nautical sports like kite surfing.

== Religion ==
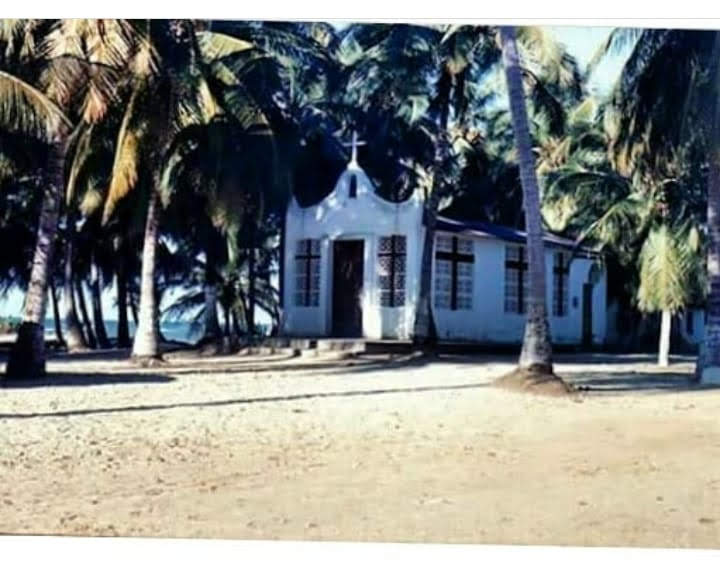
The first chapel just after construction

Our Lady of Navigators is the patroness saint of the fishermen. Every year in August she is celebrated with a novena. The chapel of Guajiru, named after the patroness, was built in 1975 under the lead of Father Tomás en mister Zezeca. Everyone in the community helped to get the building materials and constructed the building. It was drastically reformed between 2018 and 2021.

Although most people remain Catholic, Evangelical Christianity is growing in importance.
