= Trairi =

Municipality in Ceará, Brazil

Coordinates: 3.27778°S 39.2689°W

- Municipality
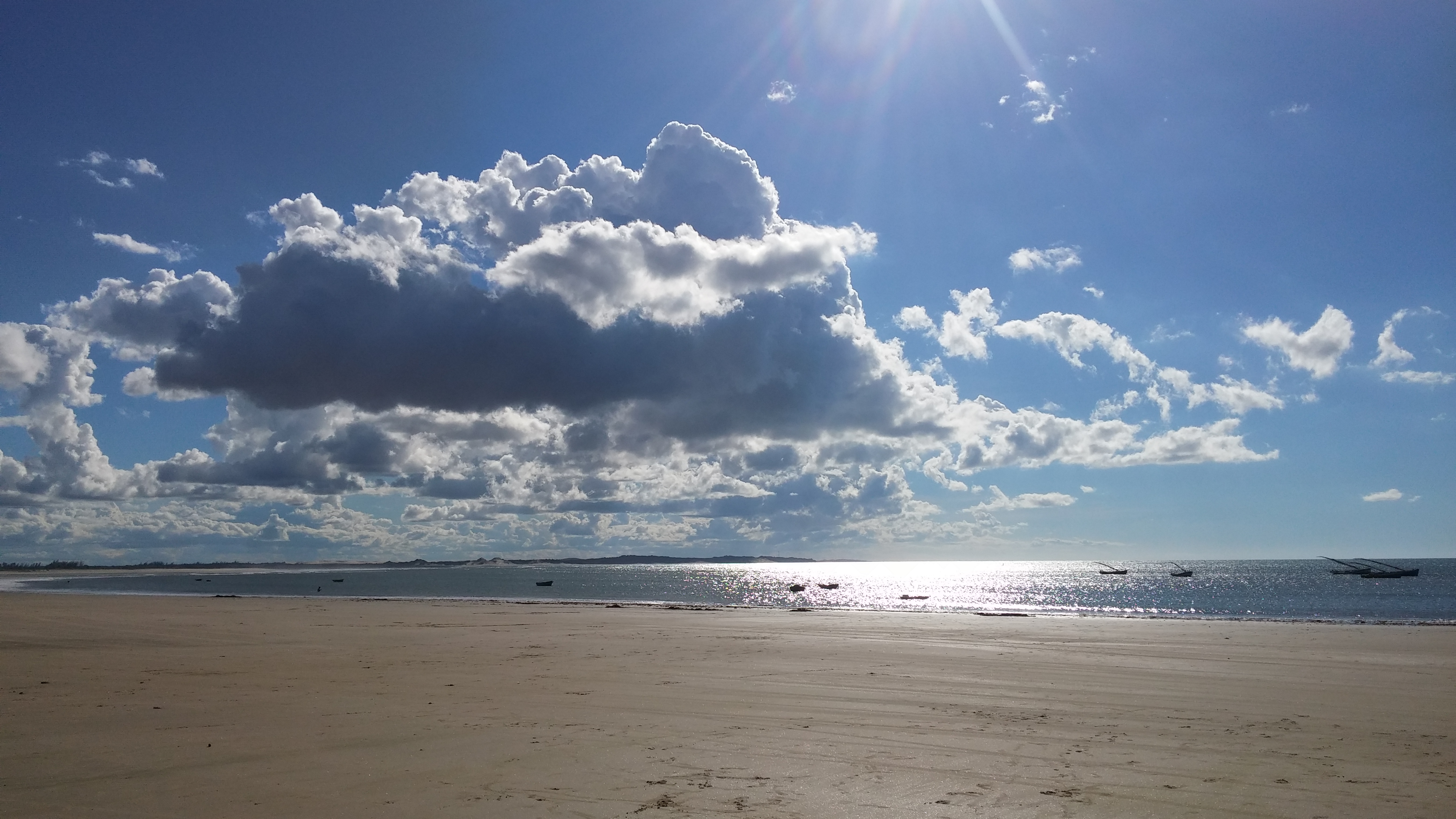

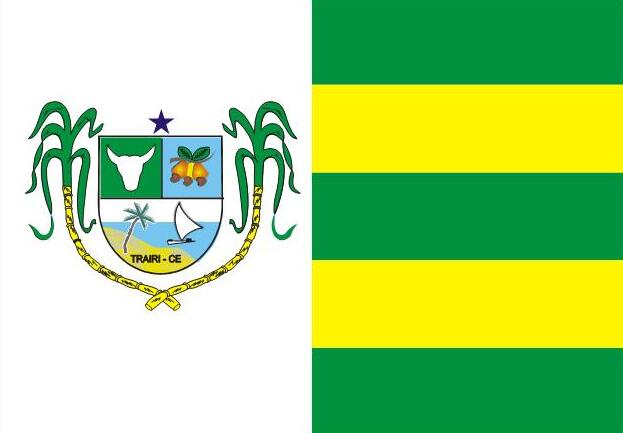
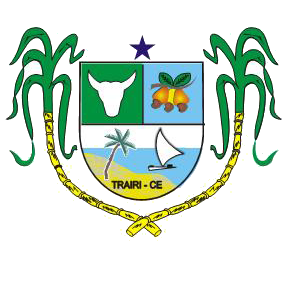
- Flag Coat of arms
- Interactive map of Trairi
- Country: Brazil
- Region: Nordeste
- State: Ceará
- Mesoregion: Noroeste Cearense

Population (2020)
  - Total: 56,291
- Time zone: UTC−3 (BRT)

Trairi is a municipality in the state of Ceará in the Northeast region of Brazil.

Trairi has a population of approximately 56000 inhabitants (2020) and is famous for its shoreline stretching from Guajiru to Mundaú. In 2013 the construction of a huge controversial windmill park began in the dunes from Barra Grande to the Mundaú River.

== See also ==
- Flecheiras
- List of municipalities in Ceará
