= Robinsonův ostrov =

- Created by: Charlie Parsons
- Country of origin: Czech Republic
- Original language: Czech
- No. of seasons: 2

Original release
- Network: TV Nova (2017–18)
- Release: January 16, 2017 – May 30, 2018

Related
- Survivor

Robinsonův ostrov is a Czech reality television program debuting in 2017. In 2016, TV Nova bought the broadcast rights to air their own version of Expedition Robinson.

The name alludes to both Robinson Crusoe and The Swiss Family Robinson, two stories featuring people being marooned by shipwrecks.

== Seasons ==
Year	Host	Channel	Participants	Winner
2017	Ondřej Novotný	TV Nova	18	Marek Orlík
2018	Ondřej Novotný	TV Nova	19	Martin Složil

== See also ==
- Survivor Česko & Slovensko
