= Survivor Česko & Slovensko =

Czech-Slovak reality competition television series

- Presented by: Ondřej Novotný
- Countries of origin: Czech Republic; Slovakia

Original release
- Network: TV Nova, Markíza
- Release: January 17, 2022 – present

Survivor Česko & Slovensko is a joint Czech-Slovak version of the reality television game show Survivor. Its first broadcast was on January 17, 2022.

== Seasons ==
Year	Host	Channel	Participants	Winner
2022	Ondřej Novotný; Martin Šmahel	TV Nova; Markíza	24	Vladimír Čapek
2023	Ondřej Novotný	TV Nova; Voyo	24	Tomáš Weimann
2024	Ondřej Novotný	TV Nova; Voyo	24	Martin "Mikýř" Mikyska
2025	Ondřej Novotný	TV Nova; Voyo	24	Pavel Tóth
2026	Ondřej Novotný	TV Nova; Voyo	26	Otakar Šenkýř
2027	Ondřej Novotný	TV Nova; Voyo	TBD	
