= Robinsonův ostrov 2018 =

- Season 2
- Presented by: Ondřej Novotný
- No. of days: 32
- No. of castaways: 19
- Winner: Martin Složil
- Runner-up: Tereza "Terry" Dušková
- Location: Caramoan, Philippines
- No. of episodes: 34

Release
- Original network: TV Nova
- Original release: 5 February – 30 May 2018

Season chronology
- ← Previous; 2017 Next → Česko & Slovensko

Robinsonův ostrov 2018 was the second season of the Czech version of Swedish television series Expedition Robinson. The season premiered on 5 February 2018. Nineteen contestants competed for 32 days to try and win 2,500,000 CZK. The main twist this season is that the tribes are divided by their gender. In addition, after the first challenge of the season, the leaders of both tribes were told to make new tribes. The person who was not picked for either tribe was eliminated from the game.

== Finishing order ==
Contestant	Original Tribe	Swapped Tribe	Merged Tribe	Voted Out	Island of Exile	Finish
Jan "Jenda" Vágner; 21, Litvínov	Kalinga			1st Voted Out; Day 3	Lost Dual; Day 7	19th
Karel Šimek; 36, Šumperk	Kalinga			2nd Voted Out; Day 5	Lost Dual; Day 11	18th
Kateřina "Káťa" Křížová; 34, Bor	Kalinga	Kalinga		5th Voted Out; Day 12	Lost Dual; Day 15	17th
Jana "Janina" Bauerová; 28, Děčín	Kalinga			3rd Voted Out; Day 8	Lost Dual; Day 15	16th
Nikol Gremplewská; 25, Karviná	Kalinga	Kalinga		4th Voted Out; Day 12	Lost Dual; Day 15	15th
Barbora "Bára" Mudrochová; Returned to game	Manobo	Manobo		6th Voted Out; Day 15	Won Dual; Day 15	
Jaroslav "Jarda" Brtník; 35, Jihlava	Manobo	Kalinga	Tawi-Tawi	8th Voted Out; Day 18	Lost Duel; 1st jury member Day 22	14th
Ondřej "Ondra" Baumrukr; 31, Soběkury	Manobo	Manobo	Tawi-Tawi	9th Voted Out; Day 19	Lost Duel; 2nd jury member Day 22	13th
Radim Nigrin; 25, Prague	Kalinga	Kalinga	Tawi-Tawi	Ejected; Day 24		12th
Barbora "Bára" Mudrochová; 26, Prague	Manobo	Manobo	Tawi-Tawi	11th Voted Out; Day 23	Lost Duel; 3rd jury member Day 25	11th
Dominik Luks; 25, Prague	Manobo	Manobo	Tawi-Tawi	7th Voted Out; Day 16	Lost Duel; 4th jury member Day 25	10th
Pavel "Bizon" Kozák; 60, Prague	Kalinga	Kalinga	Tawi-Tawi	13th Voted Out; Day 26	Lost Duel; 5th jury member Day 28	9th
Kateřina "Katka" Koubová; 25, Prague	Kalinga	Kalinga	Tawi-Tawi	14th Voted Out; Day 27	Lost Duel; 6th jury member Day 28	8th
Blanka Otrubová; 52, Uherské Hradiště	Manobo	Manobo	Tawi-Tawi	15th Voted Out; Day 28	Lost Duel; 7th jury member Day 30	7th
Petr Žilev; 25, Brno	Kalinga	Kalinga	Tawi-Tawi	12th Voted Out; Day 24	Lost Duel; 8th jury member Day 30	6th
Martin Složil; Returned to game	Manobo	Manobo	Tawi-Tawi	10th Voted Out; Day 21	Won Dual; Day 30	
Miroslav "Mirek" Hotový; 26, Ústí nad Labem	Manobo	Manobo	Tawi-Tawi	16th Voted Out; 9th jury member Day 30		5th
Zina Šímová; 38, Litvínov	Manobo	Manobo	Tawi-Tawi	17th Voted Out; 10th jury member Day 31		4th
Martina Fialková; 26, Prague	Kalinga	Kalinga	Tawi-Tawi		2nd Runner-up; Day 32	3rd
Tereza "Terry" Dušková; 22, Blevice	Manobo	Manobo	Tawi-Tawi		Runner-up; Day 32	2nd
Martin Složil; 30, Prostějov	Manobo	Manobo	Tawi-Tawi		Sole Survivor; Day 32	1st

== Finishing order ==
Challenge winners and eliminations by episode
Episode	Redemption Island challenge		Immunity winner(s)		Voted out	Finish
Episode	Winner(s)	Eliminated	Reward	Immunity	Voted out	Finish
#1	None	None	Kalinga		Petr	Not Picked; Day 2
#1	None	None	Kalinga	Manobo	Jenda	1st Voted Out; Day 3
#2	None	None	Manobo	Manobo	Karel	2nd voted out Day 5
#3	Karel	Jenda	Manobo	Manobo	Janina	3rd voted out Day 8
#4	Janina	Karel	Manobo	Manobo	Nikol	4th voted out Day 12
#4	Janina	Karel	Manobo	Manobo	Kata	5th voted out Day 12
#5	Janina, Nikol	Katka	Manobo	Kalinga	Bara	6th voted out Day 15
#6	Bara	Janina, Nikol	Zina, Blanka, Ondra	Martin	Dominik	7th voted out Day 16
#7	Dominik	None	Martina	Petr	Jarda	8th voted out Day 17
#8	Dominik, Jarda	None	None	Bara	Ondra	9th voted out Day 19
#9	Dominik, Jarda, Ondra.	None	Radim, Petr	Bizon	Martin	10th voted out Day 21
#10	Dominik, Martin	Jarda, Ondra	Radim	Mirek	Bara	11th voted out Day 23
#11	Dominik, Martin, Bara	None	None	Mirek	Radim	Ejected; Day24
#11	Dominik, Martin, Bara	None	None	Mirek	Petr	12th voted out Day 24
#12	Martin, Petr	Bara, Dominik	Auction	Mirek, Katka	Bizon	13th voted out Day 26
#13	Martin, Petr, Bizon	None		*Mirek	Katka	14th voted out Day 27
#14	Martin, Petr	Katka, Bizon	None	Terry	Blanka	15th voted out Day 28
#15	Martin	Blanka, Petr	None	None	Mirek	16th voted out 9th jury member Day 30

* Mirek bought immunity in the auction.

== Voting history ==
	Original tribes							Merged tribe													
Episode #	1		2	3	4		5	6	7	8	9	10		11		12		13	14	15	FINAL
Eliminated	Petr	Jenda	Karel	Janina	Nikol	Káťa	Bára	Dominik	Jarda	Ondra	Martin	Bára		Radim	Petr	Bizon		Katka	Blanka	Mirek	Zina
Votes	No vote (Note: Petr was not picked to join any tribe during the reward challenge. Therefore, he was sent to Redemption Island until either one of the tribes went to tribal council where he replaced the member voted off)	5/9 votes	5/9 votes	4/7 votes	4/8 votes	4/8 votes	5/9 votes	5/13 votes	4/5 votes	7/12 votes	8/11 votes	6/8 votes		Ejected (Note: Radim was found to have broken the rules, therefore he was ejected from the game)	4/8 votes	Lost Duel		2/2 votes	3/6 votes	3/5 votes	5/9 votes
Voter	Vote																				
Martina		Jenda	Karel	No vote	Nikol			Dominik	Jarda	Ondra	Martin	Bára	Bára		Petr	Bizon	No vote	~~Zina~~	Zina	Mirek	
Terry							Bára	Bizon	~~Radim~~	Bianka	Martin	Mirek	Mirek		Petr	Bizon	Bizon	~~Zina~~	Martina	Mirek	
Martin							Bára	Bianka	~~Radim~~	Bianka	Martina									Martina	
Zina							Bianka	Bizon	~~Mirek~~	Ondra	Martina	Katka	Bára		Bianka	Bizon	Bizon	Katka	Bianka	Mirek	
Mirek							Bára	Radim	~~Radim~~	Bianka	Martina	Katka	No vote		Bianka	Bianka	Bianka	Katka	Bianka x2	Martina	Martin
Bianka							Bára	Zina	~~Mirek~~	Ondra	Martin	Mirek	Mirek		Petr	No vote	No vote	~~Zina~~	Zina		Zina
Katka		Jenda	Karel	Janina	Nikol			Dominik	~~Mirek~~	Ondra	Martin	Mirek	Bára		Petr	Bizon	Bizon	~~Zina~~			Zina
Bizon		Nikol	Kata	Janina	Nikol			Dominik	Jarda	Ondra	Martin	Bára	Bára		Zina	Bianka	No vote				Martin
Petr			Kata	Janina	Kata			Dominik	Jarda	Ondra	Martin	Bára	Bára		Bianka						Zina
Radim		Nikol	Kata	Janina	Kata			Dominik	Jarda	Ondra	Martin	Bára	Bara								
Bára							Ondra	No vote	Ondra	Bianka	Martin	Mirek	No vote								Martin
Ondra							Bára	Radim	~~Radim~~	Bianka											Martin
Jarda					Káťa			Zina	~~Radim~~												Zina
Dominik							Bára														Zina
Káťa		Jenda	Karel	Katka	Nikol																
Nikol		Jenda	Karel	Katka	Káťa																
Janina		Jenda	Karel	Katka																	
Karel		Nikol	Nikol																		
Jenda		Nikol																			

Jury vote
Episode #	16		
Day #	33		
Finalist	Martin	Terry	Martina
Vote	5 - 3 - 2		
Juror	Vote		
Zina			Martina
Mirek		Terry	
Petr	Martin		
Blanka		Terry	
Katka			Martina
Bizon	Martin		
Dominik	Martin		
Bára	Martin		
Ondra		Terry	
Jarda	Martin		
