= Tvarožná =

Tvarožná may refer to several places.

- Tvarožná, Kežmarok District, Slovakia
- Tvarožná, Brno-Country District, Czech Republic
