= Survivor Česko & Slovensko 2022 =

- Season 1
- Presented by: Ondřej Novotný; Martin Šmahel
- No. of days: 68
- No. of castaways: 24
- Winner: Vladimír Čapek
- Runner-up: Veronika "Veve" Přikrylová
- Location: Dominican Republic
- No. of episodes: 32

Release
- Original network: TV Nova; Markíza
- Original release: January 17 – May 6, 2022

Season chronology
- Next → Hrdinové vs. Rebelové

Survivor Česko & Slovensko 2022 is the first season of a joint Czech-Slovak version of the reality television game show Survivor. This season premiered on January 17, 2022. The cash prize was 2.5 million Czech koruna.

== Contestants ==
Contestant	Original tribe	Switched tribe	Switched tribe II	Merged tribe	Finish	Ep.
Vojtěch Drahokoupil; 26, Singer	Mao				Left Competition; Day 2	1.
Monika Kačmaříková; 39, Český Těšín, Czech Republic	Azua				1st Eliminated; Day 3	1
Matěj Paprčiak; 30, London, England; Model	Mao	Mao			2nd Eliminated; Day 7	3
Barbora Jánová; 32, Actress	Mao	Mao			3rd Eliminated; Day 10	4
Lukáš Urban; 39, Brno, Czech Republic	Azua	Azua			4th Eliminated; Day 13	6
Gábor Boráros; 29, MMA Fighter	Mao	Mao			Medically Evacuated; Day 15	7
Iva Pazderková; 41, Beroun, Czech Republic; Actress	Mao	Azua			5th Eliminated; Day 17	8
Nathan Christián Dzaba; 26, Trnava, Slovakia; Love Island Contestant	Mao	Mao			Medically evacuated Day 20	9
Enrique Lysoněk; 22, Heroltice, Czech Republic	Azua	Azua			6th Eliminated; Day 22	10
Lenka Zuzulová; 24, Prievidza, Slovakia	Azua	Azua	Azua		7th Eliminated; Day 24	12
Adam Raiter; 33, Prague, Czech Republic	Azua	Azua	Azua		8th Eliminated; Day 29	14
Tomáš Zástěra; 42, Radio Host	Mao	Mao	Azua		Medically Evacuated; Day 33	15
Aylin Saranova; 23, Prague, Czech Republic	Azua	Azua	Mao		9th Eliminated; Day 36	16
Daniel Štrauch; 25, Bratislava, Slovakia; YouTuber	Mao	Mao	Mao		10th Eliminated; Day 40	20
Tomáš Benko; 29, Žilina, Slovakia	Azua	Azua	Mao	Bonao	11th Eliminated; 1st Jury Member; Day 45	22
Dominika Šimová; 22, Galanta, Slovakia	Azua	Azua	Mao	Bonao	12th Eliminated; 2nd Jury Member; Day 50	24
Nikola Čechová; 32, Prague, Czech Republic; YouTuber	Mao	Mao	Mao	Bonao	13th Eliminated; 3rd Jury Member; Day 55	26
Veronika Havlik; 31, Karate Champion	Mao	Mao	Azua	Bonao	14th Eliminated; 4rd Jury Member; Day 59	27
Xénia Gregušová; 22, Petrovice, Slovakia; Farma Winner	Mao	Mao	Mao	Bonao	15th Eliminated; 5rd Jury Member; Day 60	28
Branislav Martanovič; 37, Petržalka, Slovakia	Azua	Azua	Mao	Bonao	16th Eliminated; 6th Jury Member; Day 64	29
Ta Thuy "Chili" Dung; 30, Příbram, Czech Republic; MasterChef Contestant	Mao	Mao	Azua	Bonao	17th Eliminated; 7th Jury Member; Day 66	30
Johana "Johy" Špačková; 27, Frenštát pod Radhoštěm, Czech Republic	Azua	Mao	Azua	Bonao	18th Eliminated; 8th Jury Member; Day 67	31
Veronika "Veve" Přikrylová; 23, Tvarožná, Czech Republic	Azua	Azua	Azua	Bonao	Runner-up; Day 68	32
Vladimír Čapek; 44, Prague, Czech Republic	Azua	Azua	Azua	Bonao	Sole Survivor; Day 68	32

== Voting history ==
	Original tribes											Merged tribe							
Episode #	1	3	4	6	8	10	12	14	16	18	20	22	24	26		27	28	29	31
Eliminated	Monika	Matěj	Bára	Lukáš	Iva	Enrique	Lenka	Adam	Aylin	Daniel		Tomáš B.	Dominika	Nikola		Veronika	Xénia	Braňo	Johy
Voted Out	Monika	Bára	Bára	Iva	Iva	Vladimír	Adam	Adam	Daniel	Tomáš B.	Daniel	Xénia	Dominika	Chili		Veronika	Chili	Braňo	
Nominated	Vladimír	Matěj	Johy	Lukáš	Adam	Enrique	Lenka	Vladimír	Aylin			Tomáš B.	Xénia	Nikola		Chili	Xénia	Chili	
Voter	Votes																		
Veve	Monika			Iva	Iva	Dominika	Adam	Adam				Xénia	Dominika	Chili		Veronika	Chili	Braňo	
Vladimír	Monika			Veve	Veve	Dominika	~~Veve~~	Veve				Xénia	Dominika	Chili	Chili	Veronika	Chili	Braňo	
Johy	Monika	Bára	Bára				Adam	Adam				Xénia	Dominika	Chili		Veronika	Chili	Braňo	
Chili		Bára	Bára				Adam	Adam				Xénia	Braňo	Johy		Braňo	Braňo	Braňo	Johy
Braňo	Vladimír			Iva	Iva	Vladimír			Daniel	Daniel	Daniel	Johy	Johy	Chili		Veronika	Chili	Chili	Johy
Xénia		Bára	Bára						Aylin	Tomáš B.	Daniel	Tomáš B.	Braňo	Chili		Veronika	Veve		Johy
Veronika		Bára	Bára				Adam	Adam				Xénia	Dominika	Johy		Braňo			Johy
Nikola		Bára	Bára						Aylin	Tomáš B.	Daniel	Tomáš B.	Dominika	Johy					Johy
Dominika	Monika			Iva	Iva	Vladimír			Daniel	Tomáš B.	Daniel	Johy	Braňo						Johy
Tomáš B.	Vladimír			Iva	Iva	Vladimír			Daniel	Daniel	Daniel	Johy							Johy
Daniel		Veronika	—N/a						Aylin	Tomáš B.	Braňo								
Aylin	Monika			Iva	Iva	Dominika			Daniel										
Tomáš Z.		Bára	Bára				~~Veve~~	Adam											
Adam	Monika			Veve	Veve	Dominika	Lenka	Veve											
Lenka	Monika			Iva	Iva	Vladimír	Adam												
Enrique	Monika			Iva	Iva	Vladimír													
Nathan		Veronika	—N/a																
Iva				Veve	Braňo														
Gábor		Veronika	Bára																
Lukáš	Monika			Aylin															
Bára		Veronika	Johy																
Matěj		Veronika																	
Monika	Johy																		
