= Survivor Česko & Slovensko: Titáni vs. Lovci =

- Season 3
- Presented by: Ondřej Novotný
- No. of days: 78
- No. of castaways: 24
- Winner: Martin "Mikýř" Mikyska
- Runner-up: Nikola Kabátová
- Location: La Romana, Dominican Republic

Release
- Original network: TV Nova; Voyo
- Original release: February 27 – June 18, 2024

Season chronology
- ← Previous; Hrdinové vs. Rebelové Next → 2025

Survivor Česko & Slovensko Titáni vs. Lovci (transl. "Survivor Czech Republic & Slovakia: Titans vs. Hunters") is the third season of a joint Czech-Slovak version of the reality television game show Survivor.

The season is filmed in La Romana, Dominican Republic where contestants were divided into two tribes. One consisting of celebrities forming the Titáni (Titans) tribe, the other consisting of ordinary citizens forming the Lovci (Hunters) tribe. The season is presented again by Ondřej Novotný who at the end, will reveal the winner who will receive the grand prize of 2,500,000 Kč.

The season premieres on 27 February 2024 on Voyo but airs on a week later on TV Nova on 5 March 2024.

== Contestants ==
| Contestant | Original tribe | Intruders Enter | Swapped tribe | Second Swapped tribe | Merged tribe | Finish |
|---|---|---|---|---|---|---|
| Adéla Krejdlová; 22, Prague, Czech Republic; Singer | Titáni | Titáni | | | | 1st Eliminated; Day 5 |
| Michael Skalický; 33, Lanškroun, Czech Republic | Lovci | Lovci | | | | Medically evacuated Day 9 |
| Kateřina Balounová; 30, Třeboň, Czech Republic | | Titáni | | | | 2nd Eliminated; Day 9 |
| Ornella Koktová; 30, Prague, Czech Republic; Entrepreneur | Titáni | Titáni | | | | Quit due to Injury; Day 14 |
| Rachel Karnížová; 22, Drienovská Nová Ves, Slovakia; Love Island Contestant | | Lovci | | | | 3rd Eliminated; Day 15 |
| Denisa Dvořáková; 32, Prague, Czech Republic; Model | Titáni | Titáni | Titáni | | | 4th Eliminated; Day 20 |
| Sebastian Navrátil; 32, Liberec, Czech Republic; Singer | Titáni | Titáni | Titáni | | | Quit due to Family Emergency; Day 25 |
| Jakub Bína; 39, Prague, Czech Republic; Personal Trainer | | Lovci | Lovci | | | Left Competition; Day 29 |
| Filip Křížek; 24, Kolín, Czech Republic | Lovci | Lovci | Lovci | | | 5th Eliminated; Day 29 |
| Ivana Jirešová; 47, Písek, Czech Republic; Actress | Titáni | Titáni | Titáni | | | 6th Eliminated; Day 33 |
| Iva Skupnik; 29, Prague, Czech Republic | Lovci | Lovci | Lovci | Titáni | | 7th Eliminated; Day 44 |
| Veronika Sandholzová; 23, Chleby, Czech Republic | Lovci | Lovci | Lovci | Lovci | | 8th Eliminated; Day 49 |
| Jack Hamid; 45, Prague, Czech Republic | Lovci | Lovci | Lovci | Lovci | | 9th Eliminated; Day 55 |
| Kristina Alexandra Hrbková; 29, Olomouc, Czech Republic | Lovci | Lovci | Titáni | Titáni | Taínos | 10th Eliminated; 1st Jury Member; Day 59 |
| Yenifer Cao; 30, Prague, Czech Republic; Influencer | Titáni | Titáni | Titáni | Titáni | Taínos | 11th Eliminated; 2nd Jury Member; Day 61 |
| Jana Zicklerová; 52, Sokolov, Czech Republic | Lovci | Lovci | Lovci | Lovci | Taínos | 12th Eliminated; 3rd Jury Member; Day 63 |
| Martin "Márty" Prágr; 29, Hodonín, Czech Republic; Dancer | Titáni | Titáni | Titáni | Titáni | Taínos | 13th Eliminated; 4th Jury Member; Day 66 |
| Radek Polomík; 38, Prague, Czech Republic | | Titáni | Titáni | Lovci | Taínos | 14th Eliminated; 5th Jury Member; Day 68 |
| Martin "Bandurko" Husár; 29, Petržalka, Slovakia | Lovci | Lovci | Lovci | Titáni | Taínos | 15th Eliminated; 6th Jury Member; Day 70 |
| Samuel "Pirát" Krištofič; 34, Bernolákovo, Slovakia; MMA Fighter | Titáni | Titáni | Lovci | Lovci | Taínos | 16th Eliminated; 7th Jury Member; Day 73 |
| Tomáš Rys; 39, Prague, Czech Republic | Lovci | Lovci | Titáni | Titáni | Taínos | 17th Eliminated; 8th Jury Member; Day 75 |
| Martin Carev; 25, Prague, Czech Republic; YouTuber | Titáni | Titáni | Titáni | Titáni | Taínos | 18th Eliminated; 9th Jury Member; Day 76 |
| Nikola Kabátová; 31, Vrchlabí, Czech Republic | Lovci | Lovci | Lovci | Lovci | Taínos | Runner-up; Day 78 |
| Martin "Mikýř" Mikyska; 29, Prague, Czech Republic; YouTuber | Titáni | Titáni | Lovci | Lovci | Taínos | Sole Survivor; Day 78 |
