= Heroltice =

- Municipality
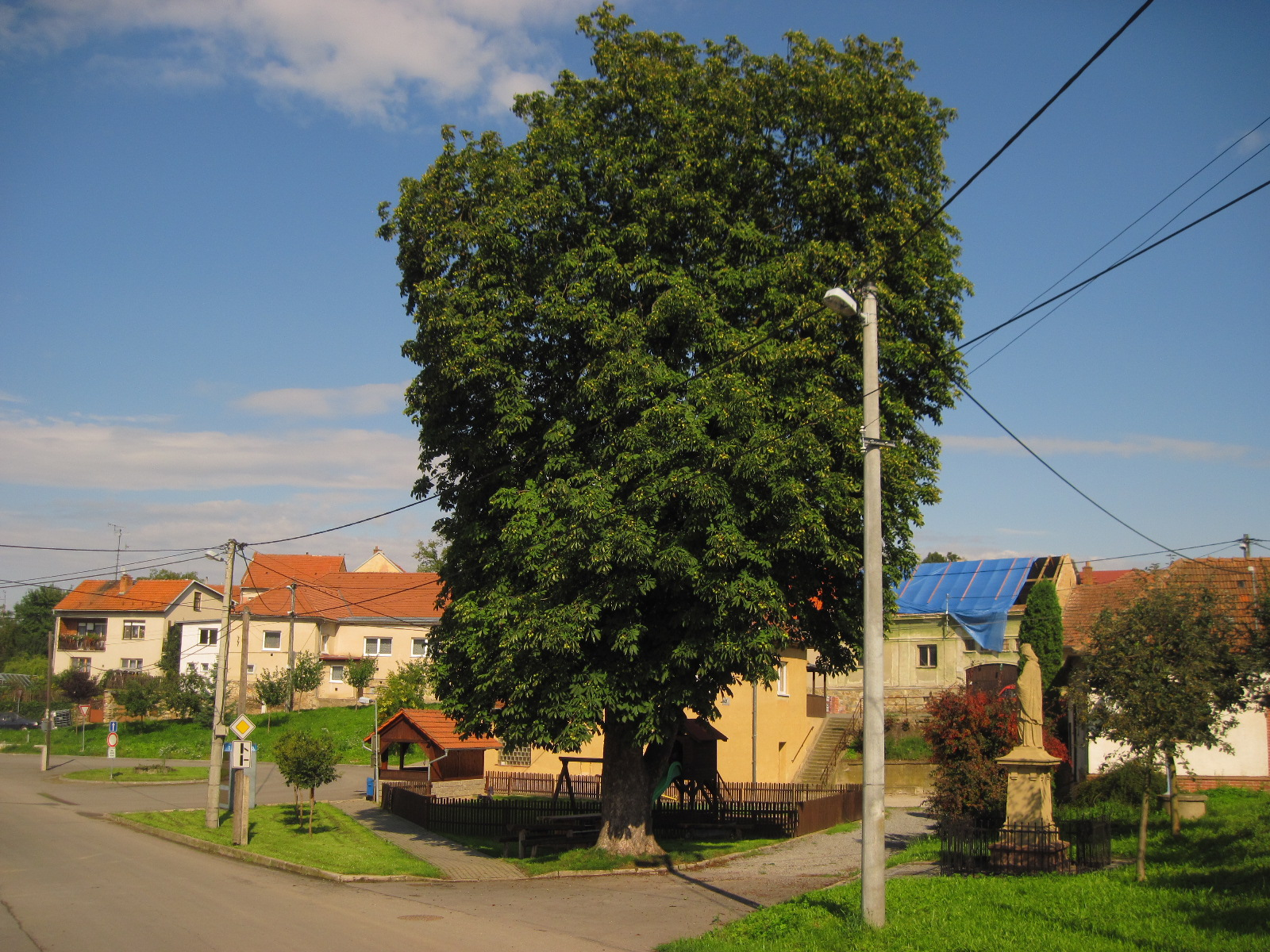
- Centre of Heroltice

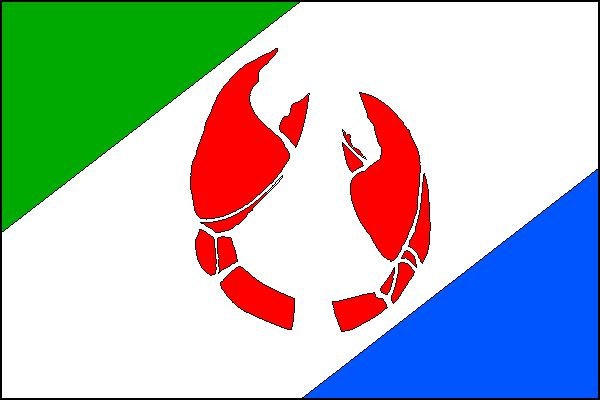
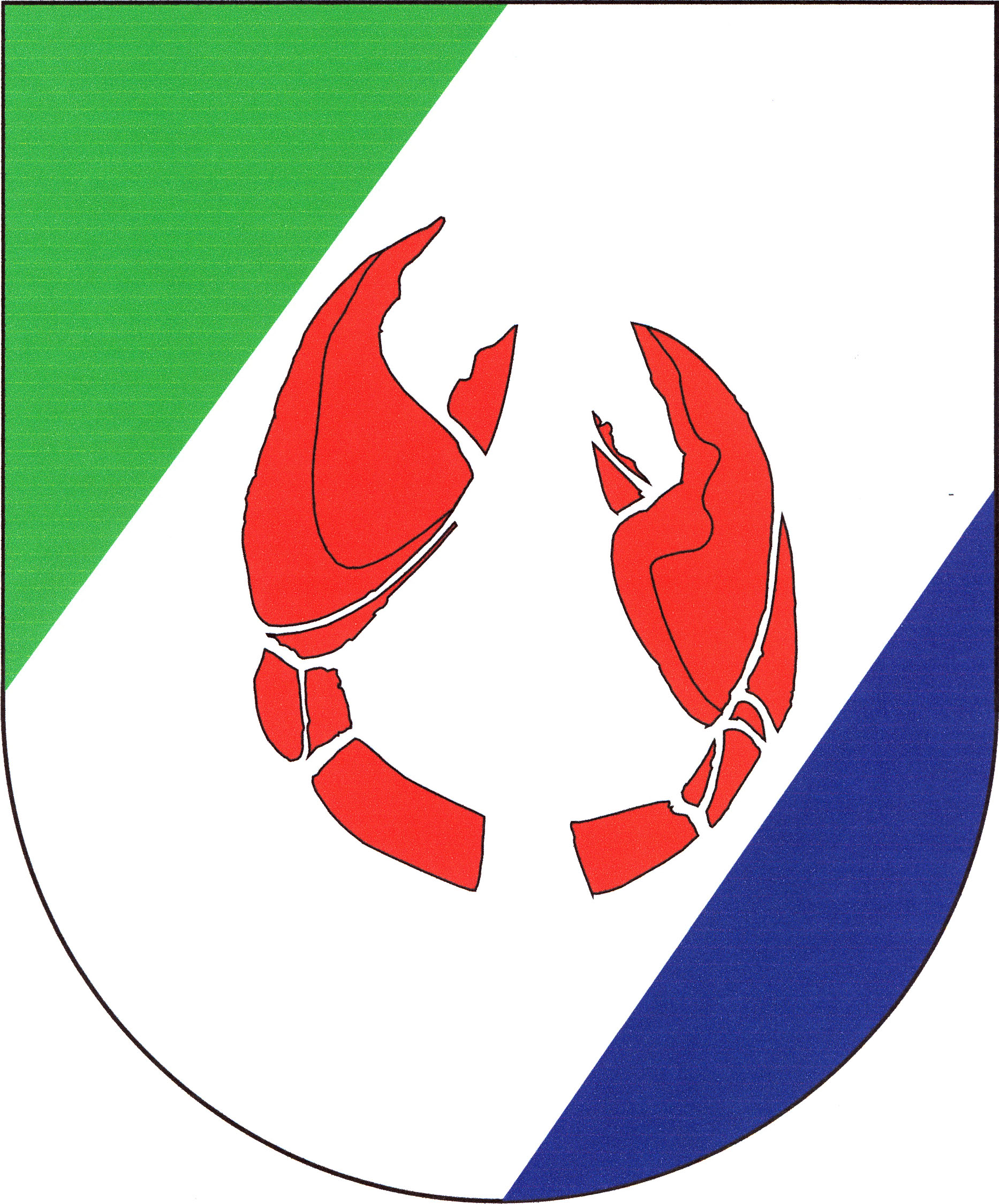
- Flag Coat of arms

- Location in the Czech Republic
- Coordinates: 49°18′41″N 16°24′46″E
- Country: Czech Republic
- Region: South Moravian
- District: Brno-Country
- First mentioned: 1316

Area
  - Total: 3.42 km^{2} (1.32 sq mi)
- Elevation: 304 m (997 ft)

Population (2026-01-01)
  - Total: 242
  - Density: 70.8/km^{2} (183/sq mi)
- Time zone: UTC+1 (CET)
  - Summer (DST): UTC+2 (CEST)
- Postal code: 666 01
- Website: www.obec-heroltice.cz

Heroltice is a municipality and village in Brno-Country District in the South Moravian Region of the Czech Republic. It has about 200 inhabitants.

Heroltice lies approximately 20 kilometres (12 mi) northwest of Brno.

== Demographics ==
Historical population
Year	Pop.	±%
1869	249	—
1880	275	+10.4%
1890	270	−1.8%
1900	244	−9.6%
1910	264	+8.2%
1921	245	−7.2%
1930	241	−1.6%
1950	214	−11.2%
1961	208	−2.8%
1970	201	−3.4%
1980	195	−3.0%
1991	178	−8.7%
2001	163	−8.4%
2011	209	+28.2%
2021	227	+8.6%
Source: Censuses
