= Blevice =

Municipality in the Czech Republic

- Municipality
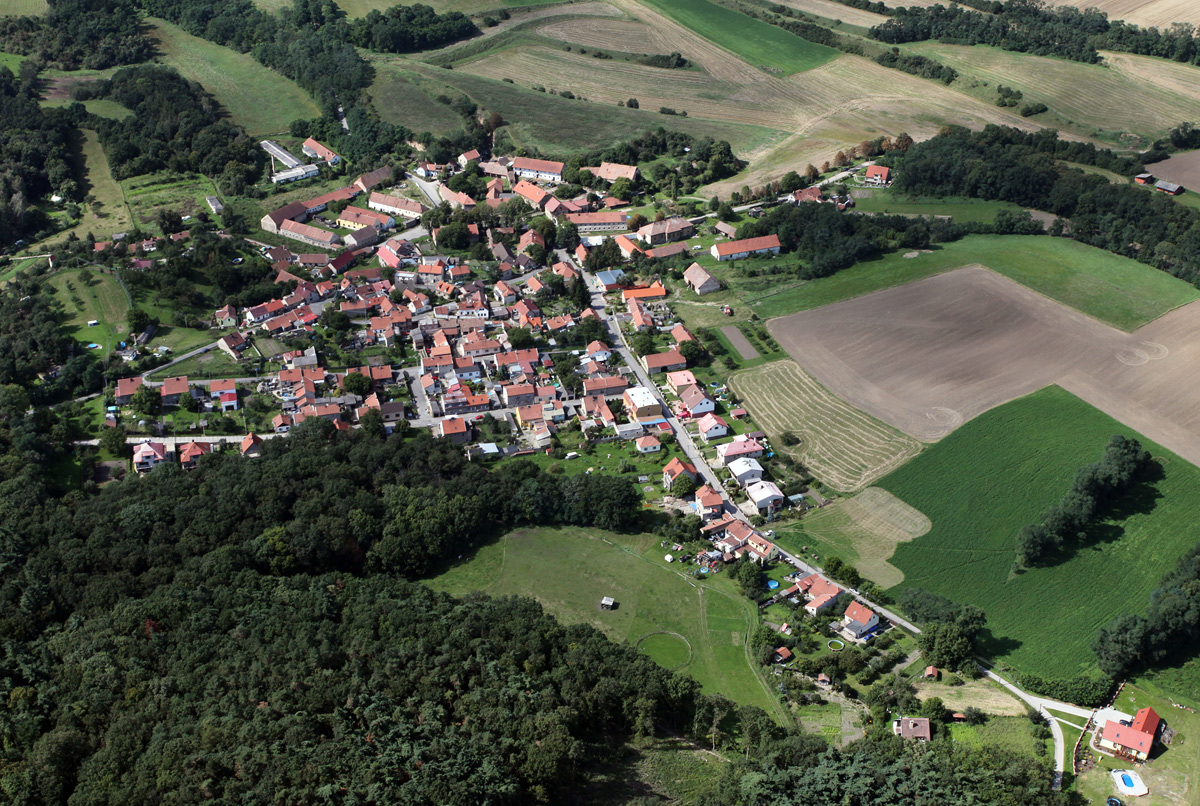
- Aerial view from the east

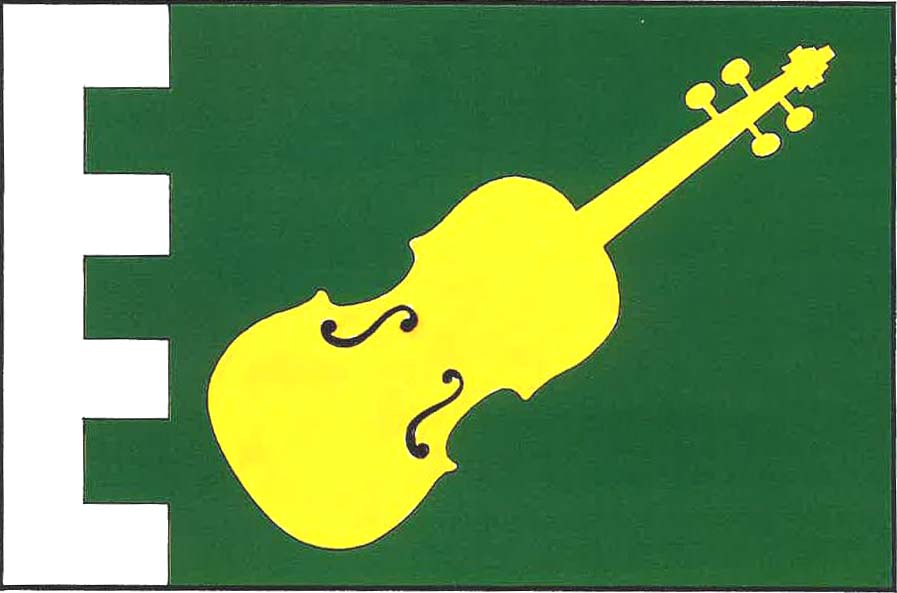
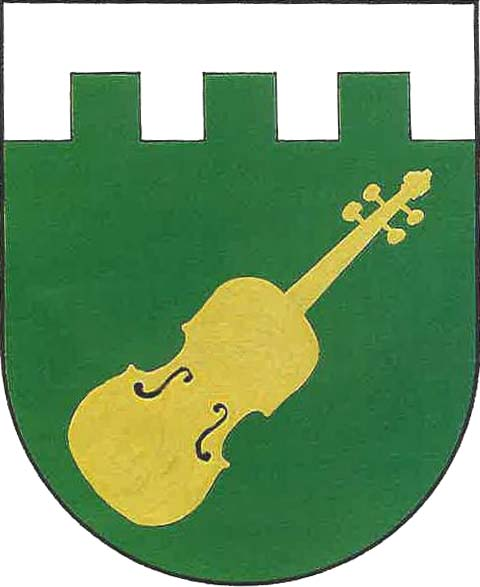
- Flag Coat of arms

- Location in the Czech Republic
- Coordinates: 50°12′35″N 14°14′10″E
- Country: Czech Republic
- Region: Central Bohemian
- District: Kladno
- First mentioned: 1282

Area
  - Total: 4.25 km^{2} (1.64 sq mi)
- Elevation: 233 m (764 ft)

Population (2026-01-01)
  - Total: 294
  - Density: 69.2/km^{2} (179/sq mi)
- Time zone: UTC+1 (CET)
  - Summer (DST): UTC+2 (CEST)
- Postal code: 273 28
- Website: www.obecblevice.cz

Blevice (Czech pronunciation: [ˈblɛvɪtsɛ]; German: Blewitz) is a municipality and village in Kladno District in the Central Bohemian Region of the Czech Republic. It has about 300 inhabitants.

== Geography ==
Blevice is located about 10 kilometres (6 mi) northeast of Kladno and 16 km (10 mi) northwest of Prague. It is located in the Prague Plateau. The highest point is at 281 m (922 ft) above sea level. The village lies at the end of a small valley whose slopes are partially covered by forest.

== History ==
The location has been inhabited a long time. As a group of 7 or 8 (today barely noticeable) prehistoric burial barrows in the wood southeast of the villages testifies. They were archaeologically explored in the 19th century. No definite opinion of the age of the barrows can be stated. Estimates vary from late Bronze Age (second half of the 2nd millennium BC) to Slavic period of early Middle Ages (second half of the 1st millennium AD).

The first written mention of Blevice is from 1282. In the 14th century, it was owned by the Vyšehrad Chapter.

== Demographics ==
Historical population

Year	Pop.	±%
1869	342	—
1880	398	+16.4%
1890	436	+9.5%
1900	453	+3.9%
1910	478	+5.5%

Year	Pop.	±%
1921	488	+2.1%
1930	480	−1.6%
1950	419	−12.7%
1961	349	−16.7%
1970	356	+2.0%

Year	Pop.	±%
1980	316	−11.2%
1991	281	−11.1%
2001	282	+0.4%
2011	285	+1.1%
2021	286	+0.4%

Source: Censuses

== Transport ==
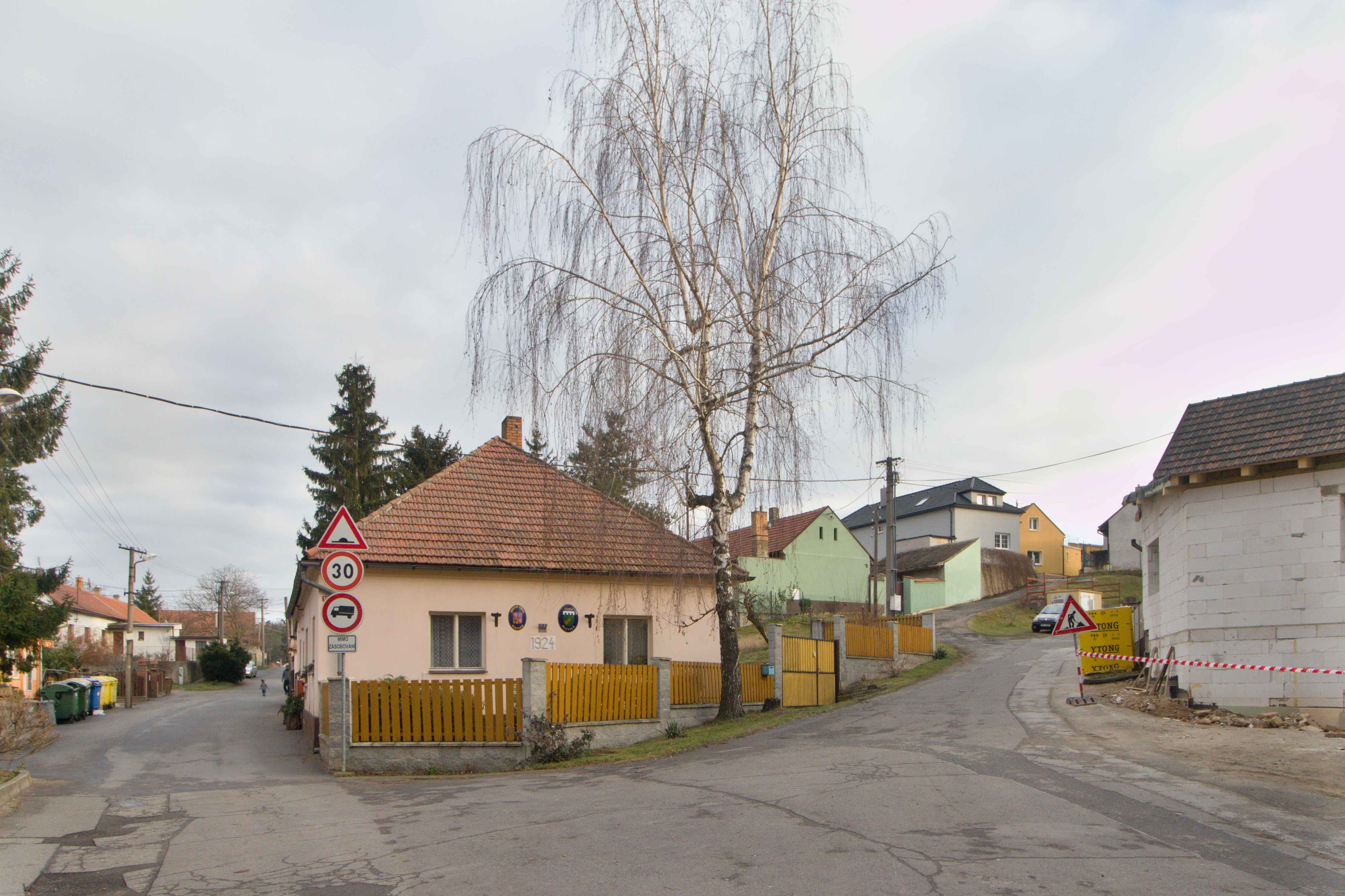
Municipal office in the centre of Blevice

There are no railways or major roads passing through the municipality.

== Culture ==
Between 1865 and 1907, Blevice was a cultural centre that hosted several important concerts. The first public performance of Czech violin virtuoso Jan Kubelík was held in Blevice in 1891. The most significant concert was Kubelík's second concert in 1899, when he was already famous.

== Sights ==
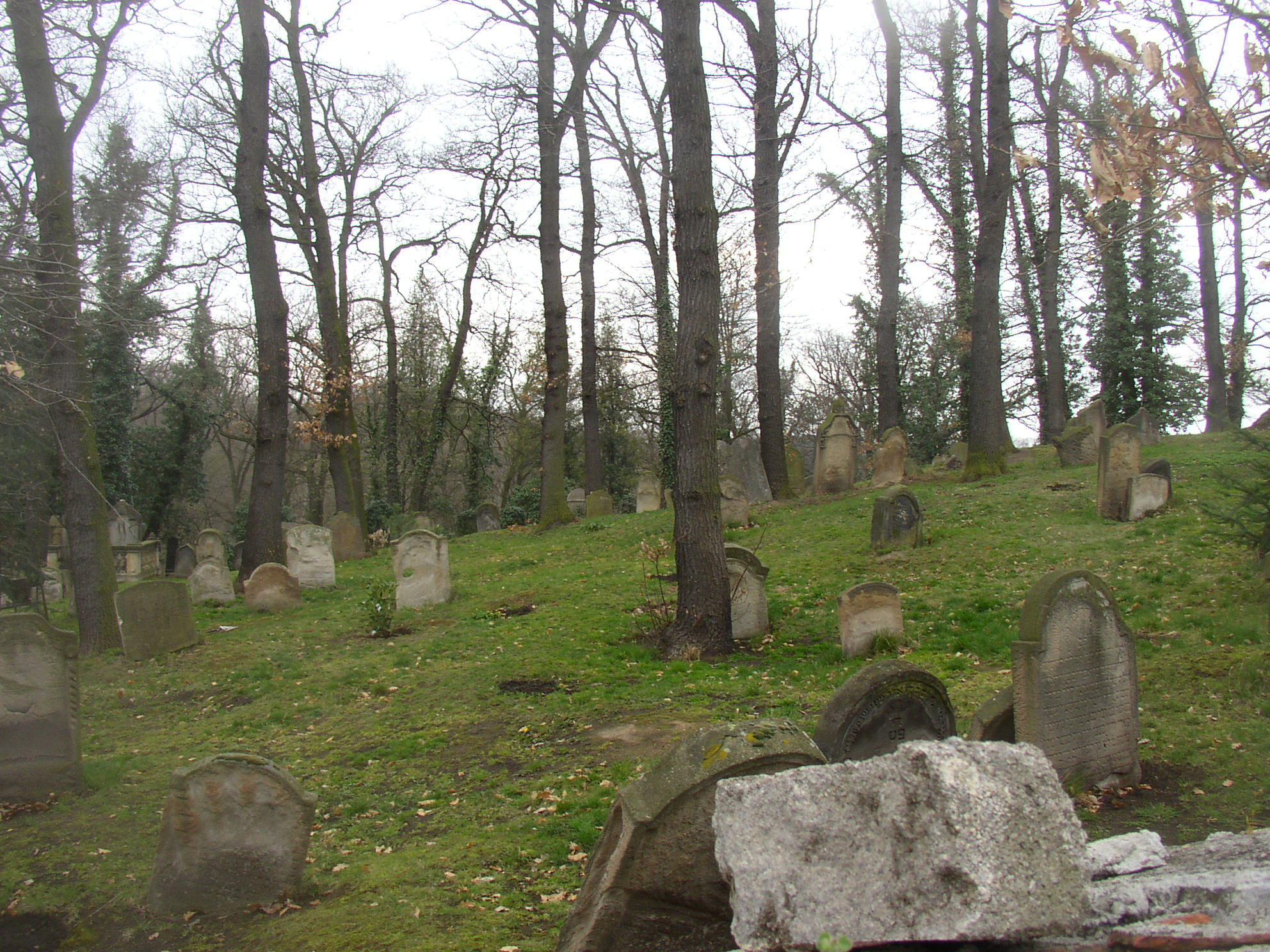
Jewish cemetery

Blevice has a Jewish cemetery located in the southern part of the municipality. Within an enclosure of about 0.24 ha (0.59 acres) there are about 300 preserved tombstones dating from the early 18th century until 1945. The neighbouring gravedigger's house from 1884 is well preserved and today serves as a private residence. Only a small number of Jewish families lived in Blevice in the 19th century, the cemetery was used mainly by Jews from the nearby town of Velvary.

In the centre of the village is a small chapel which has a memorial plaque on its side wall. The plaque lists the local victims of World War I.

== Gallery ==
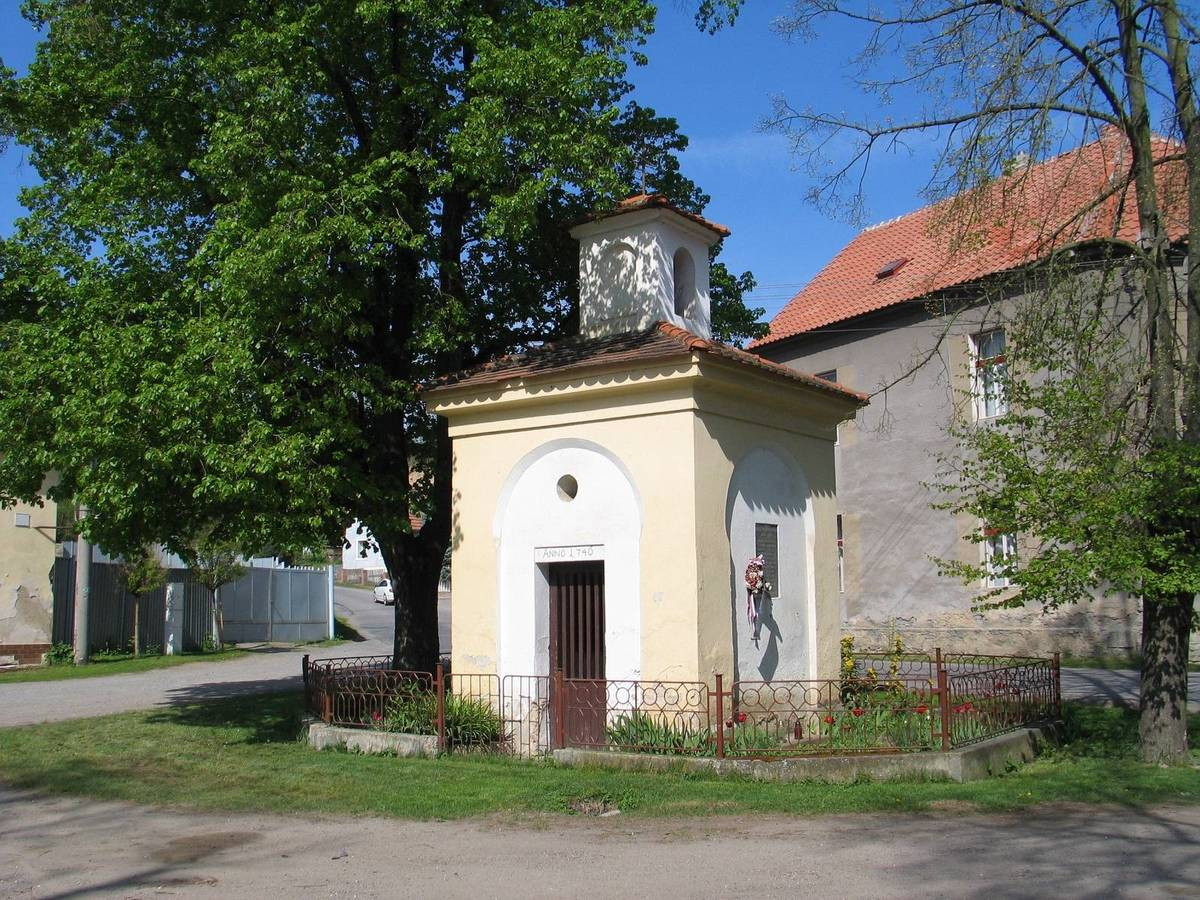
Chapel

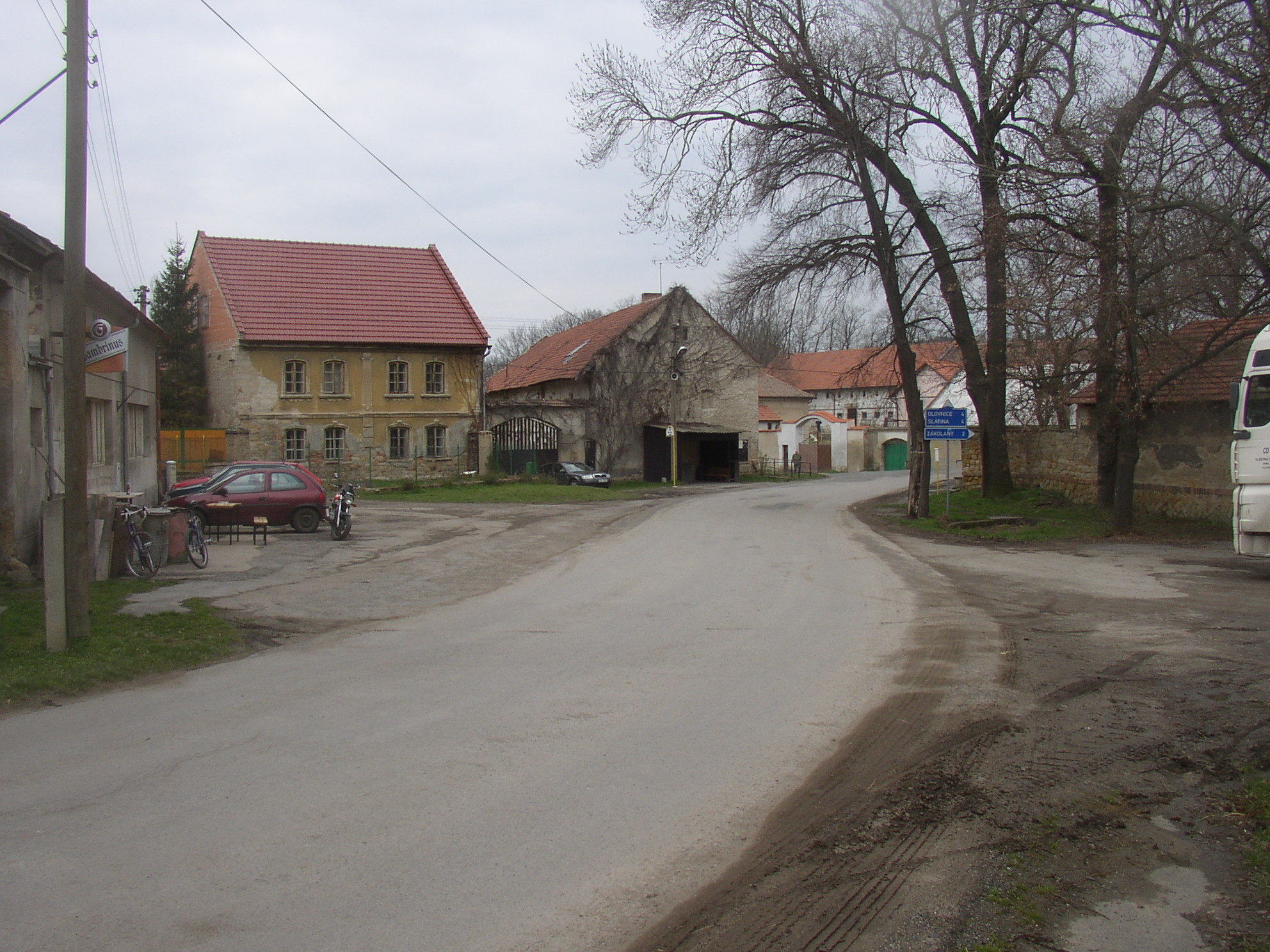
Crossroads as seen from the chapel

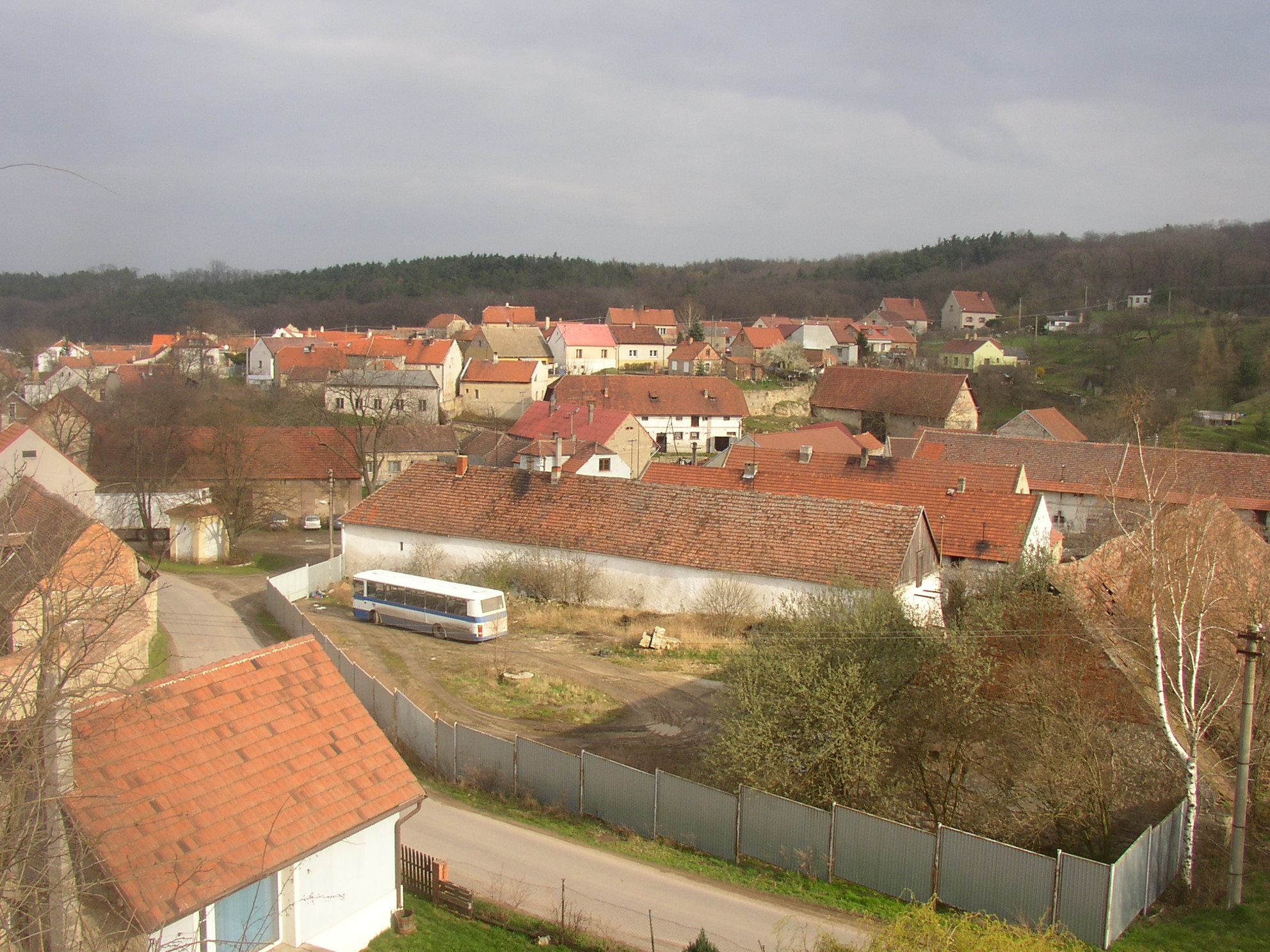
View from the northwest
