= Survivor Česko & Slovensko: Hrdinové vs. Rebelové =

- Season 2
- Presented by: Ondřej Novotný
- No. of days: 74
- No. of castaways: 24
- Winner: Tomáš Weimann
- Runner-up: Martin Konečný
- Location: Dominican Republic
- No. of episodes: 32

Release
- Original network: TV Nova; Voyo
- Original release: January 25 – May 17, 2023

Season chronology
- ← Previous; 2022 Next → Titáni vs. Lovci

Survivor Česko & Slovensko Hrdinové vs. Rebelové is the second season of a joint Czech-Slovak version of the reality television game show Survivor. This season only consists of Ondřej Novotný hosting this season unlike the previous season where he had a co-host. The season has also expanded in the amount of days the season ran for, lasting 74 days to the previous 68 days where contestants try and win 2,500,000 Kč.

The season premiered on January 25, 2023 and ended on 17 May 2023 where Tomáš Weimann won in a close 6-5 jury vote against Martin Konečný to win the grand prize and the title of Sole Survivor.

== Contestants ==
Contestant	Original tribe	Intruders enter	Swapped tribe	Merged tribe	Finish
Tereza Schejbalová; 22, Plzeň, Czech Republic	Rebelové				1st Eliminated; Day 5
Soňa Sedláčková; 40, Bratislava, Slovakia; Fitness Influencer	Hrdinové	Hrdinové			2nd Eliminated; Day 11
Hana Gelnarová; 22, Ostrava, Czech Republic	Rebelové	Rebelové			3rd Eliminated; Day 16
Václav Matějovský; 26, Actor	Hrdinové	Hrdinové			Medically Evacuated; Day 17
Barbora Mlejnková; 31, Prague, Czech Republic; Poker Player	Hrdinové	Hrdinové			4th Eliminated; Day 20
Ludmila Puldová; 55, Prague, Czech Republic	Rebelové	Rebelové			5th Eliminated; Day 26
Kateřina Klinderová; 30, Prague, Czech Republic; MMA Fighter	Hrdinové	Hrdinové	Hrdinové		6th Eliminated; Day 32
Jiří Hanousek; 33, Hradec Králové, Czech Republic	Rebelové	Rebelové	Rebelové		Left Competition; Day 36
Petr Švancara; 45, Brno, Czech Republic; Former Footballer	Hrdinové	Hrdinové	Rebelové		7th Eliminated; Day 37
Petr Havránek; 26, Pardubice, Czech Republic; Love Island Contestant	Hrdinové	Hrdinové	Hrdinové		8th Eliminated; Day 41
Filip Jánoš; 27, Bratislava, Slovakia; Farma Winner	Hrdinové	Hrdinové	Hrdinové		9th Eliminated; Day 45
Pavlína Sigmundová; 23, Drnovice, Czech Republic; Actress		Hrdinové	Hrdinové		10th Eliminated; Day 48
Matěj Quitt; 32, Brušperk, Czech Republic	Rebelové	Rebelové	Hrdinové		11th Eliminated; Day 51
Žaneta Skružná; 23, Prague, Czech Republic	Rebelové	Rebelové	Rebelové	Rivalové	12th Eliminated; 1st Jury Member; Day 57
Kristian Kundrata; 26, Banská Bystrica, Slovakia		Rebelové	Rebelové	Rivalové	13th Eliminated; 2nd Jury Member; Day 60
Martin Kulhánek; 29, Prague, Czech Republic; Love Island Winner		Hrdinové	Rebelové	Rivalové	14th Eliminated; 3rd Jury Member; Day 64
Barbora Krčálová; 21, Vranov nad Dyjí, Czech Republic		Rebelové	Rebelové	Rivalové	15th Eliminated; 4th Jury Member; Day 65
Andrea Bezděková; 29, Prague, Czech Republic; Model	Hrdinové	Hrdinové	Hrdinové	Rivalové	16th Eliminated; 5th Jury Member; Day 68
Josef Kůrka; 31, Prague, Czech Republic; Model	Hrdinové	Hrdinové	Hrdinové	Rivalové	17th Eliminated; 6th Jury Member; Day 70
Adam Bůžek; 22, Kladno, Czech Republic	Rebelové	Rebelové	Rebelové	Rivalové	18th Eliminated; 7th Jury Member; Day 72
Johana Fabišíková; 30, Banská Bystrica, Slovakia	Rebelové	Rebelové	Rebelové	Rivalové	19th Eliminated; 8th Jury Member; Day 73
Karolína Krézlová; 35, Prague, Czech Republic; Actress	Hrdinové	Hrdinové	Hrdinové	Rivalové	20th Eliminated; 9th Jury Member; Day 74
Martin Konečný; 45, Prievidza, Slovakia	Rebelové	Rebelové	Rebelové	Rivalové	Runner-up; Day 74
Tomáš Weimann; 34, Prague, Czech Republic	Rebelové	Rebelové	Hrdinové	Rivalové	Sole Survivor; Day 74
