= Robinsonův ostrov 2017 =

- Season 1
- Presented by: Ondřej Novotný
- No. of days: 44
- No. of castaways: 18
- Winner: Marek Orlík
- Runner-up: Jakub Čejpa
- Location: Caramoan, Camarines Sur, Philippines
- No. of episodes: 32

Release
- Original network: TV Nova
- Original release: January 16 – May 3, 2017

Additional information
- Filming dates: June 9 – July 22, 2016

Season chronology
- Next → 2018

Robinsonův ostrov 2017 was the first season of the Czech version of the Swedish television series Expedition Robinson. This season premiered on January 16, 2017.

== Contestants ==
Contestant	Original tribe	Switched tribe	Merged tribe	Finish	Redemption island status	Note
Kateřina "Katie" Hrabčáková; 20, Ostrava	Tabon			1st voted out Day 4		
Barbora "Barča" Hájková; 21, Liberec	Callao			2nd voted out Day 8		
Kateřina "Kačka" Šuriaková; 19, Prague	Callao			Medically evacuated Day 12		
Iveta Stará; 46, Boreč u Lovosic	Tabon			3rd voted out Day 13		
Petr "Bazi" Bazger; 65, Palonín	Tabon	Tabon		4th voted out Day 16		
Radomír "Bidlo" Řezanina; 40, Plzeň	Tabon	Tabon		5th voted out Day 20		
Miloš "Míla" Brt; 22, Prague	Callao	Callao	Mayon	6th voted out Day 24	8th Eliminated; 1st Jury Member; Day 30	
Tereza Mašková; 28, Doksy	Tabon	Tabon	Mayon	Lost Challenge; Day 21	7th Eliminated; Day 26	
Tereza Mašková; 28, Doksy	Tabon	Tabon	Mayon	Lost Challenge; Day 21	1st Returnee; Day 29	
Tereza Mašková; 28, Doksy	Tabon	Tabon	Mayon	Ejected; Day 33		
Zdeněk Doubek; 21, Staré Splavy	Tabon	Tabon	Mayon	8th voted out Day 32	9th eliminated 2nd Jury Member; Day 34	
Lucie "Lucka" Zahradníková; 33, Ostrava	Callao	Callao		Lost Challenge; Day 21	10th eliminated 3rd Jury Member; Day 38	
Radovan Koreň; 44, Dolní Lomná	Callao	Callao	Mayon	7th voted out Day 28	11th Eliminated; 4th Jury Member; Day 41	
Petra Palusková; 25, Prague	Tabon	Callao	Mayon	10th voted out Day 40	12th Eliminated; 5th Jury Member; Day 41	In Hospital; Night 28 - Day 32
Tereza "Terka" Mikšaníková; 38, Prague	Callao	Callao		Lost Challenge; Day 21	13th Eliminated; 6th Jury Member; Day 41	
Nikola "Nika" Donéová; 27, Brno	Tabon	Tabon	Mayon	Lost Challenge; 7th Jury Member; Day 42		
David Chaloupský; 45, Hradec Králové	Callao	Callao	Mayon	Lost Challenge; 8th Jury Member; Day 43		
Martin Vévoda; 24, Prague	Callao	Callao	Mayon	11th voted out 9th Jury Member; Day 44		
Jakub Čejpa; 32, Hradec Králové	Callao	Tabon	Mayon	9th voted out Day 36	2nd Returnee; Day 41	
Jakub Čejpa; 32, Hradec Králové	Callao	Tabon	Mayon	Runner-Up		
Marek Orlík; 23, Opava	Tabon	Tabon	Mayon	Sole Survivor		
