= Tvarožná (Brno-Country District) =

- Municipality
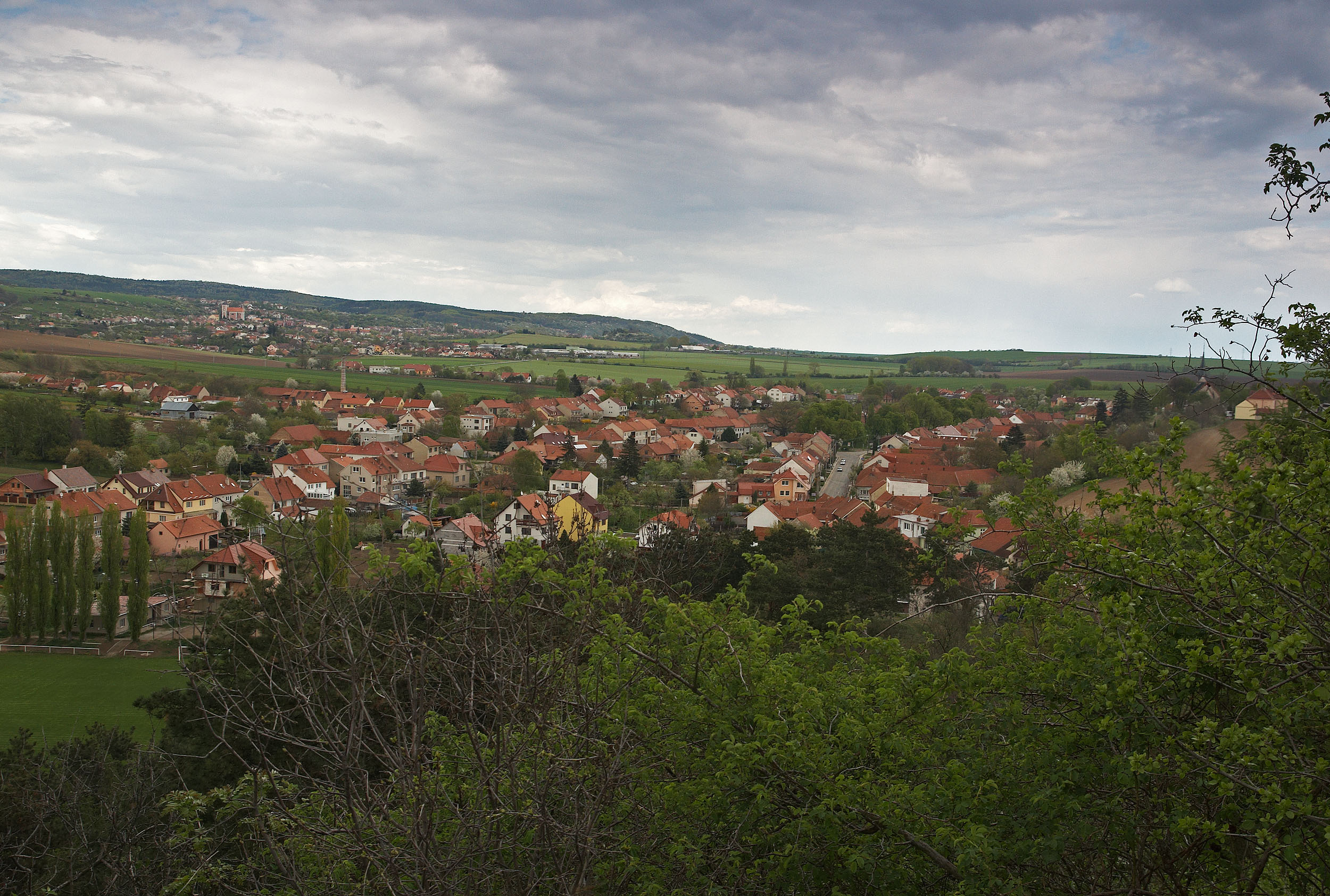
- View from the west

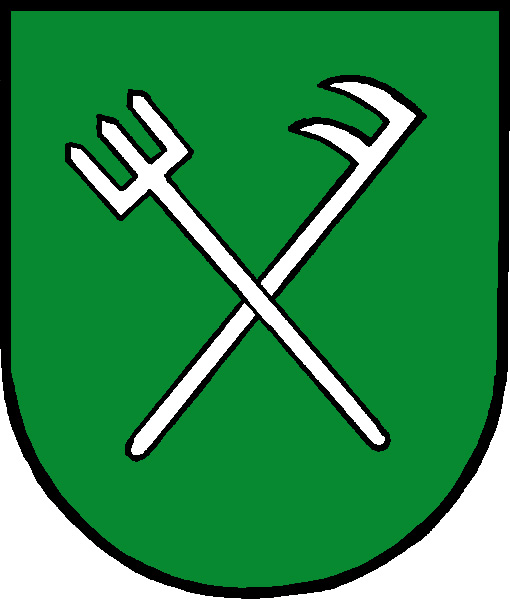
- Flag Coat of arms

- Location in the Czech Republic
- Coordinates: 49°11′30″N 16°46′17″E
- Country: Czech Republic
- Region: South Moravian
- District: Brno-Country
- First mentioned: 1288

Area
  - Total: 8.81 km^{2} (3.40 sq mi)
- Elevation: 257 m (843 ft)

Population (2026-01-01)
  - Total: 1,355
  - Density: 154/km^{2} (398/sq mi)
- Time zone: UTC+1 (CET)
  - Summer (DST): UTC+2 (CEST)
- Postal code: 664 05
- Website: www.tvarozna.cz

Tvarožná (German: Bosenitz) is a municipality and village in Brno-Country District in the South Moravian Region of the Czech Republic. It has about 1,400 inhabitants.

== Geography ==
Tvarožná is located about 10 kilometres (6 mi) east of Brno. It lies on the border between the Drahany Highlands and Dyje–Svratka Valley. The highest point is at 400 m (1,312 ft) above sea level. The stream Tvaroženský potok flows through the municipality. There is one fishpond in the municipal territory.

== History ==
The first written mention of Tvarožnice (written as Twarszonicz) is from 1288. The village was originally formed from two separate settlements, Tvarožnice and Važanice, which merged into one in the 15th century and were renamed Tvarožná.

The municipality is famous for the Battle of Austerlitz in 1805. The hill Santon in the municipality was a strategic location for Napoleon's army, being occupied by the French general Claparèd and his 17th regiment.

== Demographics ==
Historical population

Year	Pop.	±%
1869	675	—
1880	731	+8.3%
1890	809	+10.7%
1900	793	−2.0%
1910	856	+7.9%

Year	Pop.	±%
1921	879	+2.7%
1930	967	+10.0%
1950	1,001	+3.5%
1961	1,108	+10.7%
1970	1,102	−0.5%

Year	Pop.	±%
1980	1,128	+2.4%
1991	1,071	−5.1%
2001	1,163	+8.6%
2011	1,204	+3.5%
2021	1,286	+6.8%

Source: Censuses

== Transport ==
The D1 motorway from Brno to Ostrava runs through the southern part of the municipal territory.

== Sights ==
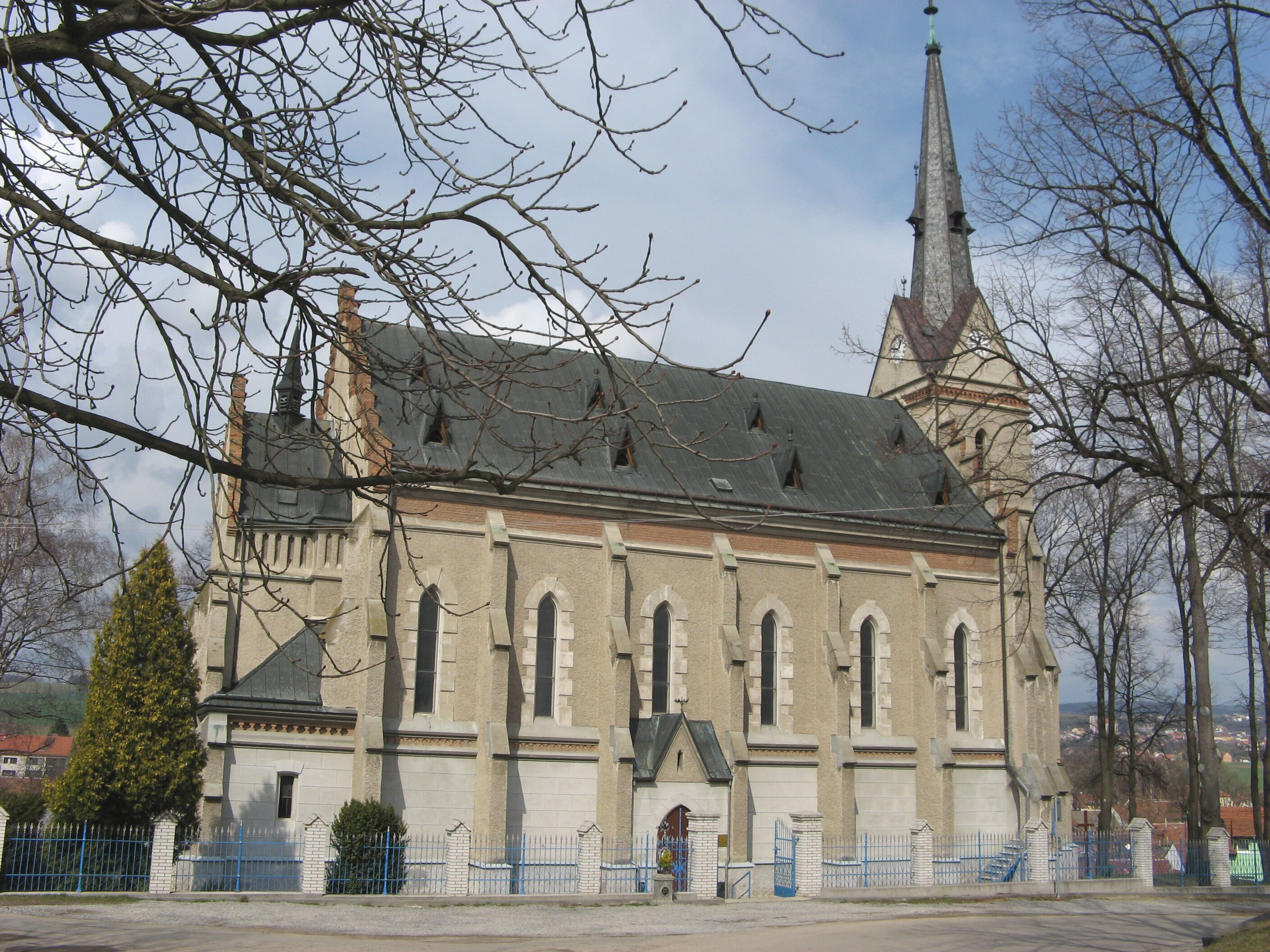
Church of Saint Nicholas

The main landmark of Tvarožná is the Church of Saint Nicholas. It was built in the neo-Gothic style in 1880–1881 and replaced an old structure from the early 14th century.

The hill Santon with an elevation of 296 metres (971 ft) is a view-point protected as a nature monument. On the top of the hill is the Chapel of Saint Mary Major from 1832.

In Tvarožná is a replica of the French canon Gribeauval to commemorate the Battle of Austerlitz. It was originally placed on Santon and later moved to the centre of the village.

== Gallery ==
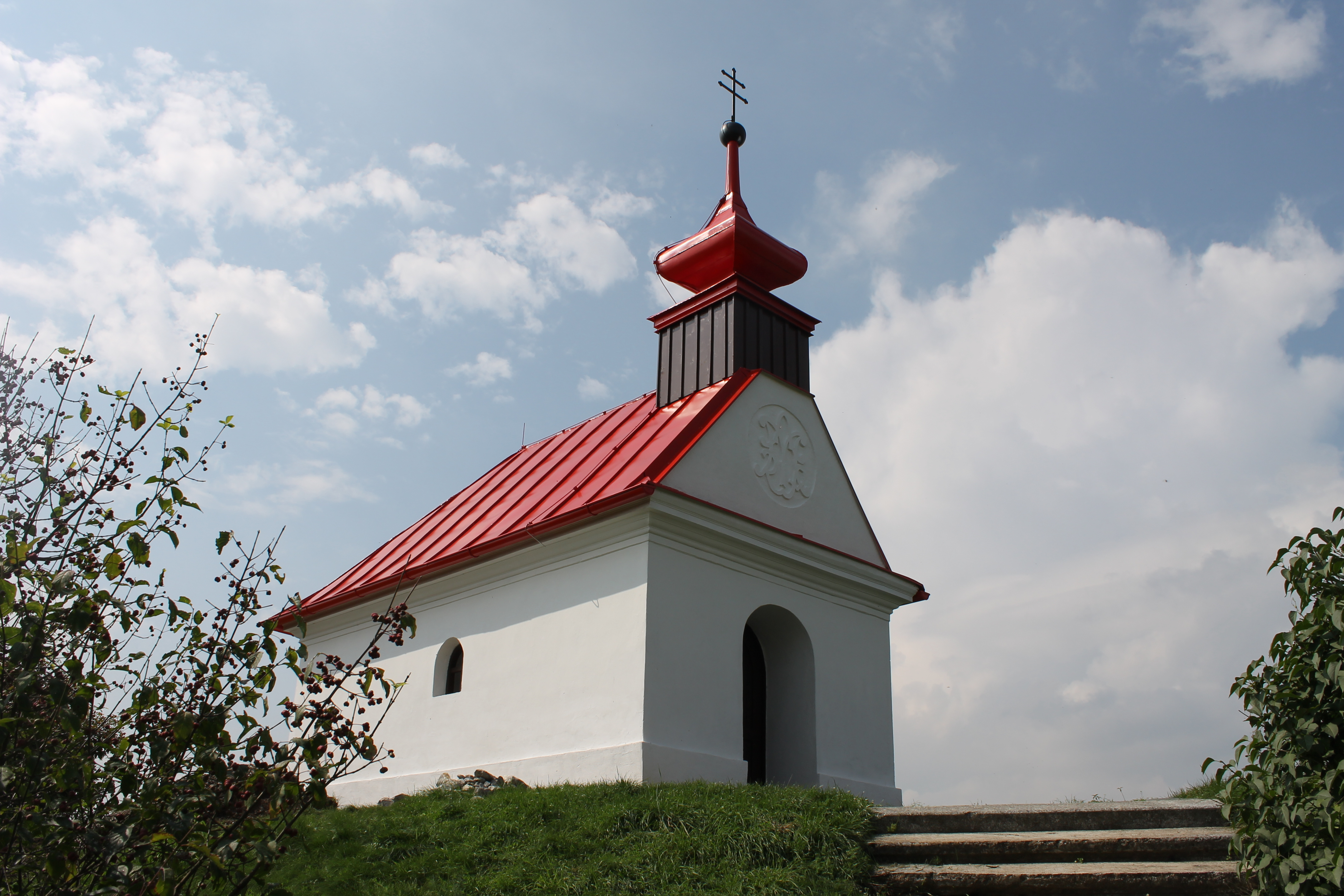
Chapel on Santon

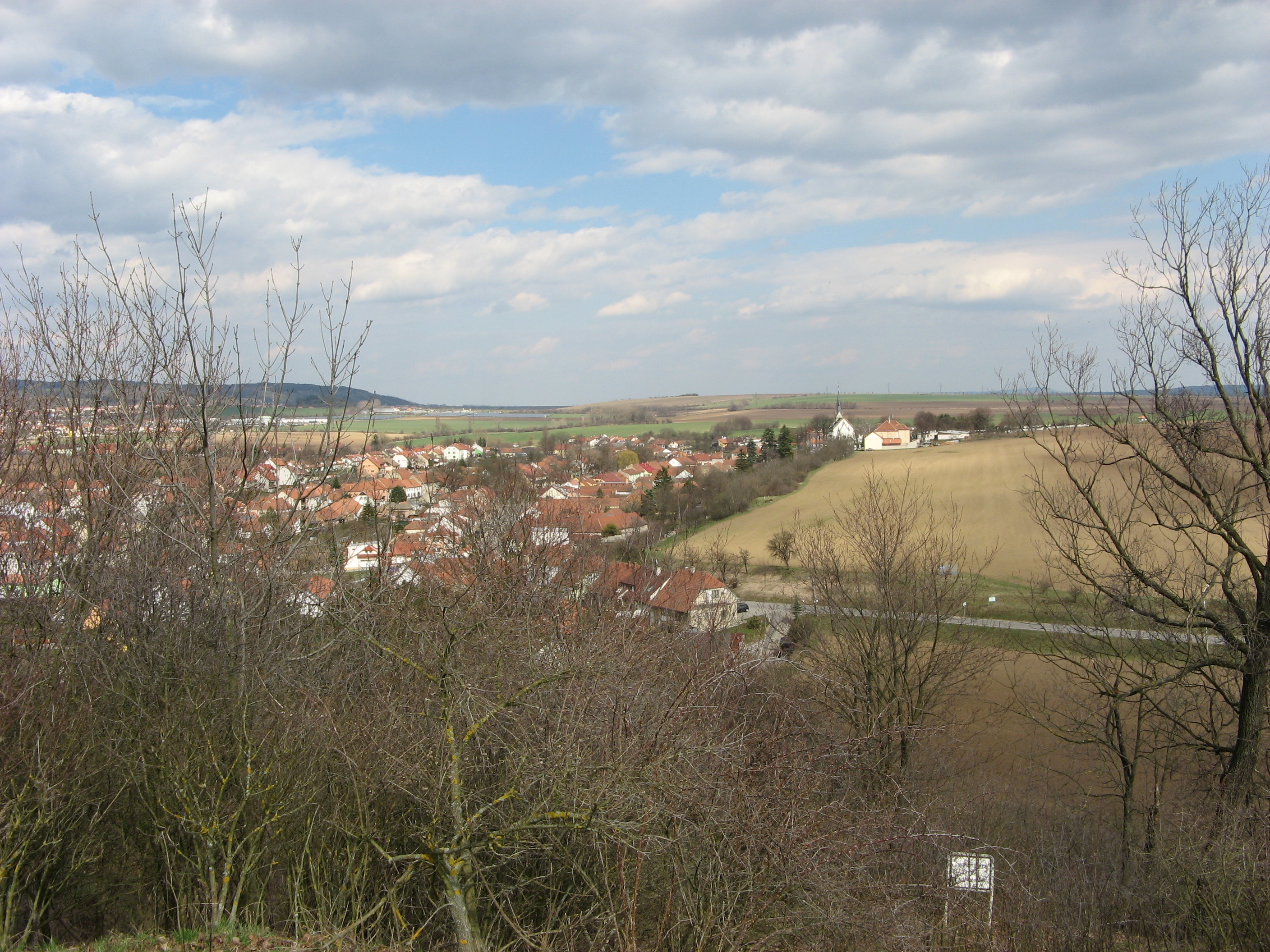
View of Tvarožná from Santon

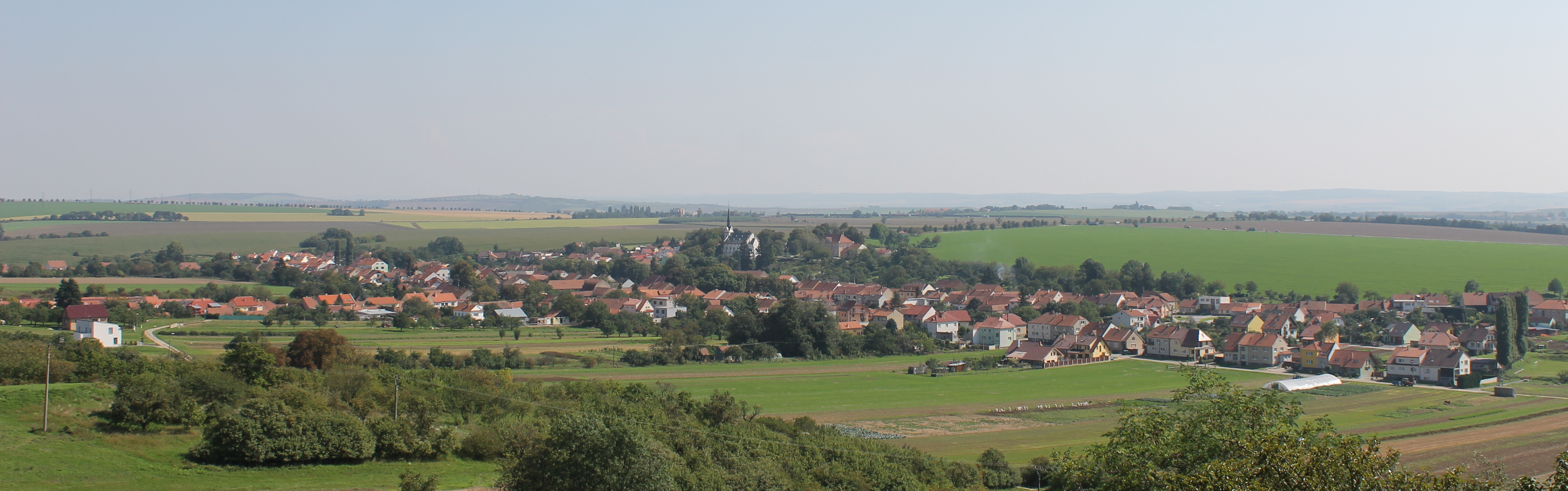
Panorama
