= Survivor 10 =

Survivor 10 may refer to:

- Survivor: Palau, the tenth season of the American version of Survivor
- Survivor (Israel), the Israeli production of Survivor
  - Survivor 10: The Caribbean, the first season of Survivor 10
  - Survivor 10: Pearl Islands, the second season of Survivor 10
  - Survivor 10: Philippine Islands, the third season of Survivor 10
  - Survivor 10: Fans vs. Favorites, the fourth season of Survivor 10
  - Survivor 10: Camarines, the fifth season of Survivor 10
  - Survivor 10: V.I.P, the sixth season of Survivor 10
