= Survivor: Palawan (Israeli season) =

- Season 8
- Presented by: Guy Zu-Aretz
- No. of days: 46
- No. of castaways: 17
- Winner: Inbar Pinievsky Basson
- Runner-up: Ma'ayan Adam
- Location: El Nido, Palawan
- No. of episodes: 36

Release
- Original network: Channel 2
- Original release: May 20 – September 16, 2017

Additional information
- Filming dates: November, 2016 – January, 2017

Season chronology
- ← Previous; Honduras Next → VIP (on Channel 13)

Survivor: Palawan (Hebrew: הישרדות פאלאוון, romanized: Hisardut Palawan) is the eighth season of the Israeli reality program Survivor. The season featured 17 contestants competing against each other for the 1 million NIS prize and the title of "Sole Survivor". It aired from May 20, 2017 until September 16, 2017, when Inbar Pinievsky Basson was named the winner over Ma'ayan Adam and Masgano Mangisto during the live finale; Adam won the fan favorite award after winning a public vote.

This season featured the return of the Island of the Dead from seasons one, four and six (as Hope Island), in which voted out contestants were exiled to a secluded beach where they competed against other voted out contestants for a chance to return to the game. This season also retained the Negotiation Cabin from seasons six and seven, in which one representative from each tribe met to negotiate deals, such as allocating supplies or picking castaways to switch tribes.

== Contestants ==
List of Survivor: Palawan contestants
Contestant	Original tribe	Switched tribe	Merged tribe	Main game (Note: Elimination order is based on when the contestant was voted out at Tribal Council.)	Island of the Dead
Daniel Avisris; 24, Kiryat Haim	None			Eliminated (Note: Daniel was not selected for either tribe, and thus was sent to the Island of the Dead immediately.); Day 2	Lost duel 2 Day 10
Adi Berger; 24, Jerusalem	Buhay			1st voted out Day 5	Lost duel 1 Day 7
Raz Nisim Cohen; 25, Tel Aviv	Ligaw			Quit; Day 6	
Nicola Ward; 20, Amir	Ligaw			2nd voted out Day 8	Lost duel 3 Day 13
Alon Sasson; 30, Tel Aviv	Buhay	Ligaw		3rd voted out Day 11	Lost duel 4 Day 16
Masgano Mangisto; Returned to game	Buhay	Buhay		4th voted out Day 14	3rd returnee Day 41
Tanita Faber; 39, Ashkelon	Buhay	Buhay		5th voted out Day 17	Lost duel 5 Day 19
Yossi Bublil; Returned to game	Ligaw	Ligaw		6th voted out Day 20	2nd returnee Day 26
Inbar Pinievsky Basson; Returned to game	Buhay	Buhay		7th voted out Day 23	1st returnee Day 26
Bar Zomer; 23, Haifa	Ligaw	Ligaw		8th voted out Day 25	Lost duel 8; 1st jury member Day 28
Amir Fachar; 26, Tel Aviv	Buhay	Buhay	Tagay	9th voted out Day 31	Lost duel 10; 2nd jury member Day 33
Sagi Braitner; 23, Caesarea	Ligaw	Buhay	Tagay	10th voted out Day 34	Lost duel 11; 3rd jury member Day 36
Yossi Bublil; 36, Netanya	Ligaw	Ligaw	Tagay	11th voted out Day 37	Lost duel 12; 4th jury member Day 39
Vered Spivak; 46, Tel Aviv	Ligaw	Ligaw	Tagay	12th voted out Day 40	Lost duel 13; 5th jury member Day 41
Raz Zehavi; 45, Hadera	Buhay	Buhay	Tagay	Eliminated (Note: For losing the elimination challenge on Day 41, Raz Z. was immediately eliminated from the game.); 6th jury member Day 41	
Michal Fucs; 34, Ness Ziona	Buhay	Ligaw	Tagay	13th voted out 7th jury member Day 43	
Netanel "Nati" Sade; 39, Nehora	Ligaw	Ligaw	Tagay	14th voted out 8th jury member Day 46	
Masgano Mangisto; 30, Ma'ale Adumim	Buhay	Buhay	Tagay	2nd runner-up	
Ma'ayan Adam; 29, Petah Tikva	Ligaw	Buhay	Tagay	Runner-up	
Inbar Pinievsky Basson; 28, Kokhav Ya'ir	Buhay	Buhay	Tagay	Sole Survivor	

== Season summary ==
Pre-merge challenge winners and eliminations by cycle
Episode(s)	Original air date(s)	Island of the Dead		Challenge winner(s)			Voted out	Finish
Episode(s)	Original air date(s)	Winner	Loser	Reward	Tribal immunity	Individual immunity	Voted out	Finish
1	May 20, 2017	None					Daniel	Eliminated (Note: Daniel wasn't selected for either tribe, and thus was sent to the Island of the Dead immediately.); Day 2
2 & 3	May 24 & 27, 2017	None		Buhay	Ligaw	Raz Z.	Adi	1st voted out Day 5
4, 5 & 6	May 31, June 7 & 10, 2017	Daniel	Adi	Ligaw	Buhay	Vered	Raz N.	Quit; Day 6
4, 5 & 6	May 31, June 7 & 10, 2017	Daniel	Adi	Ligaw	Buhay	Vered	Nicola	2nd voted out Day 8
7 & 8	June 14 & 17, 2017	Nicola	Daniel	Ligaw	Buhay	Yossi	Alon	3rd voted out Day 11
9 & 10	June 21 & 24, 2017	Alon	Nicola	Buhay	Ligaw	~~Mangisto~~; Tanita (Note: At Tribal Council, Mangisto chose to give his immunity to Tanita.)	Mangisto	4th voted out Day 14
11 & 12	June 28 & July 1, 2017	Mangisto	Alon	Ligaw	Ligaw	Ma'ayan (Note: Ma'ayan and Yossi represented their tribes at the immunity challenge and automatically earned individual immunity if they lost; Ma'ayan lost, thus earning individual immunity.)	Tanita	5th voted out Day 17
11 & 12	June 28 & July 1, 2017	Mangisto	Alon	Ligaw	Ligaw	Sagi	Tanita	5th voted out Day 17
13 & 14	July 5 & 8, 2017	Mangisto	Tanita	Buhay	Buhay	~~Michal~~; Nati (Note: At Tribal Council, Michal chose to give her immunity to Nati.)	Yossi	6th voted out Day 20
15 & 16	July 12 & 15, 2017	Yossi (Note: This was a non-elimination duel in which the winner received a reward.)	Mangisto	Buhay	Ligaw	Raz Z.	Inbar	7th voted out Day 23
17 & 18	July 19 & 22, 2017	None		Nati, Vered, Amir, Sagi, Bar (Note: The challenge was competed individually; any contestants who completed it in the allotted time earned reward.)	Buhay	Vered	Bar	8th voted out Day 25
18 & 19	July 22 & 26, 2017	Inbar (Note: Returned to the game upon winning Island of the Dead challenge.)	Bar (Note: For losing the challenge, Bar and Mangisto remained on the Island of the Dead.)	Buhay	Tribes merged			
18 & 19	July 22 & 26, 2017	Yossi	Mangisto	Buhay	Tribes merged			

Post-merge challenge winners and eliminations by cycle
Episode(s)	Original air date(s)	Island of the Dead		Challenge winner(s)			Voted out	Finish
Episode(s)	Original air date(s)	Winner	Loser	Reward	Immunity	Veto	Voted out	Finish
20, 21 & 22	July 29, August 2 & 5, 2017	Mangisto	Bar	Amir	Inbar (Note: For placing first in the previous Island of the Dead challenge, Inbar received individual immunity at the next Tribal Council.)	Ma'ayan	Amir	9th voted out Day 31
20, 21 & 22	July 29, August 2 & 5, 2017	Inbar	Mangisto	Sagi [Ma'ayan, Raz Z. Yossi]	Sagi	Ma'ayan	Amir	9th voted out Day 31
23 & 24	August 9 & 12, 2017	Mangisto	Amir	Survivor; Auction	Inbar	Vered	Sagi	10th voted out Day 34
25 & 26	August 16 & 19, 2017	Mangisto	Sagi	Nati [Vered]	Ma'ayan	Nati	Yossi	11th voted out Day 37
27, 28 & 29	August 26 & 30, September 2, 2017	Mangisto	Yossi	Ma'ayan [Inbar]	Inbar	Vered	Vered	12th voted out Day 40
30, 31 & 32	September 6, 7 & 9, 2017	Mangisto	Vered	None (Note: No reward challenge due to elimination challenge.)	Nati	Mangisto	Raz Z.	Eliminated (Note: For losing the elimination challenge on Day 41, Raz Z. was immediately eliminated from the game.); Day 41
30, 31 & 32	September 6, 7 & 9, 2017	Mangisto	Vered	None	Nati	Mangisto	Michal	13th voted out Day 43
32 & 33	September 9 & 13, 2017			Ma'ayan [Inbar, Mangisto, Nati]	Ma'ayan	Inbar (Note: For winning the final veto challenge, Inbar earned the power to stop one of the jurors from voting for the winner; she chose Yossi.)	Nati	14th voted out Day 46
34	September 16, 2017						Jury vote	
34	September 16, 2017						Mangisto	2nd runner-up
34	September 16, 2017						Ma'ayan	Runner-up
34	September 16, 2017						Inbar	Sole Survivor

== Survivor Auction ==
Contestants	Item(s)
Vered	Falafel with tahini, fries and salad
Ma'ayan	Rice porridge with coconut milk
Ma'ayan	Robe
Nati	Chicken thighs
Michal	New buff
Sagi	Chocolate eggs
Sagi	Shakshuka
Sagi	~~Letter from home~~ (Taken by Yossi)
Raz Z.	Sushi
Yossi	Take someone else's auction item (Letter from home; originally Sagi's)
Yossi	Extra vote
Yossi	DHL Express
Inbar	500 Pesos for Survivor Auction
Inbar	A poster of the host, Guy Zu-Aretz

== Voting history ==
	Original tribes				Switched tribes							Merged tribe							
Episode #:	1	3	4	6	8	10		12	14	16	18	22	24		26	29	30	32	33
Day #:	2	5	6	8	11	14		17	20	23	25	31	34		37	40	41	43	46
Eliminated:	Daniel	Adi	Raz N.	Nicola	Alon	Mangisto		Tanita	Yossi	Inbar	Bar	Amir	Sagi		Yossi	Vered	Raz Z.	Michal	Nati
Votes:	Eliminated (Note: Daniel was not selected for either tribe, and thus was sent to the Island of the Dead immediately.)	6–2	Quit (Note: No vote; Raz N. chose to quit the game.)	4–3	2–0 (Note: Yossi played a hidden immunity idol on Bar, therefore four votes against her were not counted.)	3–0 (Note: Amir played a hidden immunity idol on Ma'ayan, therefore five votes against her were not counted.)		4–2	4–2	2–2 (Note: The vote was tied with Inbar and Ma'ayan receiving two votes each; as such, the tie was resolved by a firemaking competition, which Ma'ayan won.)	3–1	3–0 (Note: Yossi played a hidden immunity, therefore five votes against him were not counted.)	5–3		5–1	3–2	Challenge (Note: For losing the elimination challenge on Day 41, Raz Z. was immediately eliminated from the game.)	3–1	3–1
Voter	Vote																		
Inbar		Adi				~~Ma'ayan~~		Amir		Ma'ayan		~~Yossi~~	Sagi		Yossi	Vered		None (Note: This castaway was given the veto bracelet, and was therefore not eligible to vote.)	Nati
Ma'ayan				Nati		Mangisto		Tanita		Inbar		Amir	Nati		Vered	Vered		Michal	Nati
Mangisto		Adi				~~Ma'ayan~~												Michal	Nati
Nati				Nicola	~~Bar~~				Yossi		Bar	~~Yossi~~	Sagi		Yossi	Ma'ayan		Michal	Mangisto
Michal		Adi			~~Bar~~				Yossi		Bar	~~Yossi~~	Sagi		Yossi	None		Mangisto	
Raz Z.		Adi				~~Ma'ayan~~	~~Ma'ayan~~ (Note: Raz Z. played an extra vote advantage, allowing him to cast two ballots during a single vote.)	Tanita	Yossi (Note: For winning the immunity challenge, Buhay got to send a tribe member to attend and vote in Ligaw's Tribal Council; Raz Z. was sent.)	None (Note: As Sagi give the veto bracelet to Raz Z. at Tribal Council, Raz Z. was not eligible to vote.)		~~Yossi~~	Sagi		Yossi	Vered			
Vered				Nicola	~~Bar~~				Yossi		Bar	~~Yossi~~	Sagi		Yossi	Ma'ayan			
Yossi				Nicola	Alon				Vered			Amir	Nati	Nati (Note: Yossi played an extra vote advantage, allowing him to cast two ballots during a single vote.)	None				
Sagi				Nicola		Mangisto		Tanita		Inbar		Amir	None						
Amir		Inbar				Mangisto		Tanita		Ma'ayan		None							
Bar				Nati	Alon				Vered		Nati								
Tanita		Adi				~~Ma'ayan~~		Amir											
Alon		Adi			~~Bar~~														
Nicola				Nati															
Raz N.																			
Adi		Inbar																	
Daniel																			

Jury vote
Episode #:			
Day #:	46		
Finalist:	Mangisto	Ma'ayan	Inbar
Votes:	5–2–0		
Juror	Vote		
Nati			Inbar
Michal			Inbar
Raz Z.			Inbar
Vered			Inbar
Yossi	None (Note: For winning the final veto challenge, Inbar earned the power to stop one of the jurors from voting for the winner; she chose Yossi.)		
Sagi		Ma'ayan	
Amir			Inbar
Bar		Ma'ayan	
