= Survivor: Fans vs. Favorites =

Survivor: Fans vs. Favorites may refer to:

- Survivor: Micronesia, the sixteenth season of American version of Survivor, also known as Survivor: Micronesia — Fans vs. Favorites
- Survivor: Fans vs. Survivors, the fourth season of Survivor 10 (Israel)
- Survivor: Caramoan, the twenty-sixth season of American version of Survivor, also known as Survivor: Caramoan — Fans vs. Favorites
