= The Bachelor (Israeli TV series) =

- Country of origin: Israel
- No. of seasons: 2
- No. of episodes: 31

The Bachelor, also called HaRavak, is a reality television series broadcast on Israeli Channel 10 from December 2009. The program is based on the American format of The Bachelor first aired in 2002 on ABC.

== Format ==
Each season, there is one single man (the "Bachelor") and a group of single women who are collectively competing for his heart (the "contestants"). The season takes place over a series of episodes where the Bachelor embarks on various dates and romantic getaways with the contestants as he determines his compatibility with each of them. Along the way, the Bachelor will eliminate contestants until he narrows down the playing field to two eligible candidates. At this point, the Bachelor will decide the winner, and they continue together in a relationship.

In the first season of the show, the bachelor was Guy Geyor, who previously participated in the second season of Survivor. At the end of the season, he chose contestant Daphne de Groot. The second season of the show began airing on June 12, 2013, with the singer Dudu Aharon as the Bachelor looking for his fiancée. The final program was broadcast on 29 August 2013 with Aharon selecting challenger Danino. Shortly after the final broadcast the two announced that they had separated.

== First season ==
First season bachelor faced Survivor contestant Guy Geyor. This season choose the Bachelor contestants Daphne de Groot.

=== Contestants ===
Hdhtn order:

- Viktory Otnakov
- Maya Chen
- Yael Bar
- Michal Bar
- Meitar David
- Katya Bar
- Liat Frodzon
- Hilla Daddy
- Karin Shmir
- Malayan Melis
- Noa Bik
- Yael Levy
- Yasmin Swisa
- Valeri Dan
- Natali Turgeman
- Daphne de groot (Winner)

== Second season ==
The second season is unmarried singer Dudu Aharon. This season, unlike last season, had a light and humorous atmosphere more and carried the slogan "must marry his cousin." This season choose the bachelor contestants planted Danino couple Separate shortly after the show airs.

=== Contestants ===
- Shiran Izenkot
- Liraz Ben dahan
- Batel Tavori
- Karin Cohen
- Hodaya Sassoon
- Inbal Amirav
- Chen Ohana
- Anael Kor
- Karmit Siani
- Lapid Sidler
- Noa Hoyo
- Liron Golan
- Neta Danino (Winner)
