= Survivor: Honduras (Israeli season) =

- Season 7
- Presented by: Guy Zu-Aretz
- No. of days: 46
- No. of castaways: 18
- Winner: Liron "Tiltil" Orfali
- Runner-up: Yityish "Titi" Aynaw
- Location: Honduras
- No. of episodes: 33

Release
- Original network: Channel 2
- Original release: November 1, 2015 – March 1, 2016

Additional information
- Filming dates: June 2015 – July 2015

Season chronology
- ← Previous; VIP (on Channel 10) Next → Palawan

Survivor: Honduras (Hebrew: הישרדות הונדורס, Hisardut Honduras) is the seventh season of the Israeli reality program Survivor. The season features 18 contestants, 9 celebrities and 9 non-celebrities, competing against each other for the 1 million NIS prize and the title of "Sole Survivor". The season was filmed in Honduras during June and July 2015. The season, the first of the show to air on Channel 2, aired twice weekly from November 1, 2015, until the live finale on March 1, 2016, where Liron "Tiltil" Orfali was named the Sole Survivor and audience's favorite player after winning a public vote.

This season introduced the zombie twist, in which eliminated contestants remained in the game as zombies, living in a fenced-off area in their former tribe's camp. The next time their former tribe lost an immunity challenge, the zombie challenged one of their former tribe-mates to a duel. If the zombie lost the duel, the zombie exited the game as normal. If the zombie won, they voted in the duel loser's stead at the upcoming Tribal Council, and then duelled the newly voted out castaway for the right to remain the zombie. At predetermined points during the game, the remaining zombies competed against each other, with the winner returning to the game. This was the first season that the jury voted for the winner during the game, instead of months later at the live finale as in previous seasons (the result was still revealed at the live finale), and the only season to feature four finalists facing the jury's vote instead of two or three. This season also retained the Negotiation Cabin from the previous season, in which one contestant from each tribe met to negotiate deals, such as picking castaways to switch tribes or choosing items to take from the other tribes' camp.

== Contestants ==
The cast includes nine celebrities and nine ordinary Israelis. The nine civilians include model Huda Naccache.

Contestant	Original tribe	Switched tribe	Merged tribe	Main game (Note: Elimination order is based on when the contestant was voted out at Tribal Council.)	Zombie
Ben-Yahav Navat; 36, Petah Tikva	Huracan			1st voted out Day 3	Lost duel 2 Day 11
Jeanette Zohar Sabag; 55, Jaffa	Coyopa			Medically evacuated Day 5	
Meital Dohan; 36, Los Angeles; Actress	Coyopa			2nd voted out Day 6	Lost duel 1 Day 8
Moshik Galamin; Returned to game	Coyopa	None (Note: Moshik was not assigned either tribe during the tribe switch due to being on Zombie.)		3rd voted out Day 9	1st returnee Day 23
Lisa Shurkin; 36, Tel Aviv	Huracan	Huracan		4th voted out Day 12	Lost duel 4 Day 15
Omer Rozen; 30, Tel Aviv	Huracan	Huracan		5th voted out Day 15	Lost duel 12; 2nd jury member Day 29
Yehuda Shushan; 42, Neve Ilan	Huracan	Huracan		6th voted out Day 19	Forfeited duel 6 Day 19
Shimon Amsalem; 49, Tel Aviv; Former basketball player	Huracan	Huracan		7th voted out Day 22	Lost duel 8 Day 22
Huda Naccache; Returned to game	Huracan	Coyopa		8th voted out Day 23	2nd returnee Day 23
Ron Aluf; 23, Rishon LeZion	Coyopa	Coyopa	Tepeu	9th voted out Day 27	Lost duel 11; 1st jury member Day 27
Ron Shoval; 42, Ramat Gan; Singer	Coyopa	Coyopa	Tepeu	10th voted out Day 30	Declined; 3rd jury member Day 30
Liron Revivo; 21, Beit Uziel	Huracan	Huracan	Tepeu	11th voted out Day 33	Lost duel 18; 7th jury member Day 41
Moshik Galamin; 36, Tel Aviv; Designer, TV host	Coyopa	None	Tepeu	12th voted out Day 33	Lost duel 13; 4th jury member Day 33
Huda Naccache; 26, Haifa	Huracan	Coyopa	Tepeu	13th voted out Day 36	Lost duel 15; 5th jury member Day 36
Jenny Chervoney; 33, Tel Aviv; Model	Coyopa	Coyopa	Tepeu	14th voted out Day 39	Lost duel 17; 6th jury member Day 39
Dana Berger; 44, Jerusalem; Singer, actress	Coyopa	Huracan	Tepeu	15th voted out Day 42	Lost duel 19; 8th jury member Day 45
Yityish "Titi" Aynaw; Returned to game	Coyopa	Coyopa	Tepeu	16th voted out Day 45	3rd returnee Day 45
Ruslana Rodina; 27, Rehovot; Model	Huracan	Huracan	Tepeu	2nd runner-up	
Omri Kohavi; 28, Tel Aviv	Coyopa	Coyopa	Tepeu	2nd runner-up	
Yityish "Titi" Aynaw; 24, Tel Aviv; Miss Israel 2013	Coyopa	Coyopa	Tepeu	Runner-up	
Liron "Tiltil" Orfali; 40, Ramat Gan; HaMerotz LaMillion 4	Huracan	Huracan	Tepeu	Sole Survivor	

== Season summary ==
Pre-merge challenge winners and eliminations by cycle
Episode(s)	Original air date(s)	Challenge winner(s)			Vote duel		Voted out	Finish	Zombie duel	
Episode(s)	Original air date(s)	Reward	Tribal immunity	Individual immunity	Winner	Loser	Voted out	Finish	Winner	Loser
1 & 2	November 1 & 3, 2015	None	Coyopa	Ruslana	None		Ben-Yahav	1st voted out Day 3	None	
3 & 4	November 8 & 10, 2015	Coyopa	Huracan	Moshik	None		Jeanette	Medically evacuated Day 5	None	
3 & 4	November 8 & 10, 2015	Coyopa	Huracan	Moshik	None		Meital	2nd voted out Day 6	None	
5 & 6	November 15 & 17, 2015	Coyopa	Huracan	Ron A.	Ron S.	Meital	Moshik	3rd voted out Day 9	None	
7 & 8	November 22 & 23, 2015	Huracan	Coyopa	Dana (Note: Anyone who switched tribes received immunity if their new tribe attended the first Tribal Council after the switch; Huracan lost, and Dana became immune.)	Omer	Ben-Yahav	Lisa	4th voted out Day 12	None	
7 & 8	November 22 & 23, 2015	Huracan	Coyopa	Amsalem	Omer	Ben-Yahav	Lisa	4th voted out Day 12	None	
9 & 10	November 29 & December 1, 2015	Coyopa	Coyopa	Shushan	Lisa	Dana	Omer	5th voted out Day 15	Omer	Lisa
11, 12, 13 & 14	December 6, 8, 13 & 15 2015	Coyopa	Coyopa	Liron (Note: The castaways competed in a special immunity challenge in pairs composed of one member of each tribe. Liron and Ron A. won the challenge, and would be immune if their tribe lost the next immunity challenge; Huracan lost, and Liron became immune.)	Omer	Liron	Shushan	6th voted out Day 19	Omer	Shushan (Note: Shushan forfeited the duel.)
11, 12, 13 & 14	December 6, 8, 13 & 15 2015	Coyopa	Coyopa	Tiltil	Omer	Liron	Shushan	6th voted out Day 19	Omer	Shushan
15 & 16	December 20 & 22, 2015	Both tribes (Note: The tribes competed in a head-to-head quiz; the tribe whose representative answered each question correctly got to retrieve a luxury item.)	Coyopa	~~Amsalem~~; Tiltil (Note: At Tribal Council, Amsalem chose to give his individual immunity to Tiltil.)	Omer	Tiltil	Amsalem	7th voted out Day 22	Omer	Amsalem
17	December 27, 2015	Huracan (Note: In addition to winning immunity, the Huracan tribe earned the right to sit in on Coyopa's Tribal Council and vote to give immunity to one player from their tribe; they chose Jenny.)		Jenny	None (Note: There was no zombie duel due to the upcoming merge.)		Huda	8th voted out Day 23	Moshik (Note: Returned to game upon winning duel.)	Omer (Note: Omer was not eliminated from the game upon losing the duel; instead, he became the first zombie for the merged tribe, Tepeu.)
17	December 27, 2015	Huracan		Jenny	None		Huda	8th voted out Day 23	Huda	Omer

Post-merge challenge winners and eliminations by cycle
Episode(s)	Original air date(s)	Challenge winner(s)			Vote duel		Voted out	Finish	Zombie duel	
Episode(s)	Original air date(s)	Reward	Immunity	Veto	Winner	Loser	Voted out	Finish	Winner	Loser
18, 19 & 20	December 29, 2015, January 3 & 5, 2016	Ron A., Titi [Liron]	Moshik (Note: For placing first in the previous zombie duel, Moshik won immunity at the next Tribal Council.)	Tiltil	Omer	Ron S.	Ron A.	9th voted out Day 27	Omer	Ron A.
18, 19 & 20	December 29, 2015, January 3 & 5, 2016	Ron A., Titi [Liron]	Omri	Tiltil	Omer	Ron S.	Ron A.	9th voted out Day 27	Omer	Ron A.
21 & 22	January 10 & 12, 2016	Survivor; Auction	Tiltil	Moshik	Huda	Omer	Ron S.	10th voted out Day 30	None	
23 & 24	January 17 & 19, 2016	Titi (Note: Titi chose to forgo seeing her video from home so the other remaining castaways could see theirs.)	Jenny	Jenny	None		Liron	11th voted out Day 33	None	
23 & 24	January 17 & 19, 2016	None (Note: Immediately after Liron was voted out, Tepeu was instructed to vote out another member; there were no challenges.)					Moshik	12th voted out Day 33	Liron	Moshik
25 & 26	January 24 & 26, 2016	Jenny [Titi]	Tiltil	Jenny	Liron	Dana	Huda	13th voted out Day 36	Liron	Huda
27 & 28	January 31 & February 2, 2016	~~Jenny~~ [Omri, Tiltil] (Note: Jenny chose to give her reward to Omri and Tiltil.)	Omri	Omri	Liron	Tiltil	Jenny	14th voted out Day 39	Liron	Jenny
29 & 30	February 7 and 9, 2016	Omri [Titi]	Ruslana	Omri	Dana	Liron	Dana	15th voted out Day 42	None	
31 & 32	February 14 and 21, 2016	Omri	Ruslana	None			Titi	16th voted out Day 45	Titi	Dana
33	March 1, 2016						Jury vote			
33	March 1, 2016						Ruslana	2nd runner-up		
33	March 1, 2016						Omri	2nd runner-up		
33	March 1, 2016						Titi	Runner-up		
33	March 1, 2016						Tiltil	Sole Survivor		

== Survivor Auction ==
Contestants	Item(s)
Titi	Cinnamon roll
Titi	Blanket
Huda	Tacos and salsa
Ruslana	Baby doll
Moshik	Falafel and tahini
Moshik	Salad and orange juice
Dana	Socks
Jenny	300 Honduran lempira
Tiltil	Package from Israel (Backgammon, Israeli sand, nuts, and an mp3 player with Israeli music)
Ron S.	Hamburger, french fries and cola
Omri	Sushi
Liron	Vote doubler

== Voting history ==
	Original tribes				Switched tribes					Merged tribe							
Episode #:	2	4		6	8	10	14	16	17	20	22	24		26	28	30	32
Day #:	3	5	6	9	12	15	19	22	23	27	30	33		36	39	42	45
Eliminated:	Ben-Yahav	Jeanette	Meital	Moshik	Lisa	Omer	Shushan	Amsalem	Huda	Ron A.	Ron S.	Liron	Moshik	Huda	Jenny	Dana	Titi
Votes:	7–2	Evacuated (Note: No vote; Jeanette was medically evacuated from the game.)	5–3	4–3	4–3–1	4–3	4–2	2–0 (Note: Liron used a hidden immunity idol, therefore the three votes cast against her were not counted.)	2–0 (Note: For winning the reward/immunity challenge, the Huracan tribe got to vote to give immunity to one member of Coyopa; Jenny won the vote, therefore the four votes cast against her were not counted.)	5–4–1	5–4	7–1	6–1–1	5–1	3–2	4–0	2–2 (Note: The initial vote resulted in a tie between Tiltil and Titi; as such, the tie was resolved by a firemaking competition, which Tiltil won.)
Voter	Vote																
Tiltil	Ben-Yahav				Lisa	Omer	Shushan	None (Note: For losing the zombie duel, this castaway was unable to vote at the next Tribal Council, while the zombie voted in their stead.)		Ron A.	Ron S.	Liron	Moshik	Huda	None	Dana	Titi
Titi			Meital	Moshik					~~Jenny~~	None (Note: This castaway was given the veto bracelet, and was therefore not eligible to vote.)	Dana	Liron	Moshik	Huda	Jenny	Dana	Tiltil
Omri			Meital	Moshik					Huda	Dana	Dana	Liron	Moshik	Huda	Jenny	Dana	Tiltil
Ruslana	Ben-Yahav				Lisa	Omer	Shushan	~~Liron~~		Ron A.	Ron S.	Liron	Moshik	Huda	Jenny	Dana	Titi
Dana			Ron S.	Ron S.	Lisa	None	Shushan	~~Liron~~		Ron A.	Ron S.	Liron	Moshik	None	None	None	
Jenny			Meital	Ron S.					Huda	Ron A.	Ron S.	Liron	Huda	Huda	Dana		
Huda	Shushan								~~Jenny~~	Dana	Dana	Liron	Moshik	None			
Moshik			Ron S.	Ron S.						Ron A.	Ron S.	Dana	Omri				
Liron	Ben-Yahav				Tiltil	Ruslana	None	Amsalem		Dana	None	None		Dana (Note: For winning the zombie duel, the zombie voted at the next Tribal Council in the place of the castaway they defeated.)	Dana		
Ron S.			Meital	Moshik					~~Jenny~~	None	Dana						
Ron A.			Meital	Moshik					~~Jenny~~	Dana							
Amsalem	Ben-Yahav				Lisa	Omer	Dana	~~Liron~~									
Shushan	Ben-Yahav				Ruslana	Omer	Dana										
Omer	Ben-Yahav				Tiltil	Ruslana	Shushan	Amsalem		Huda							
Lisa	Ben-Yahav				Tiltil	Ruslana											
Meital			Ron S.														
Jeanette																	
Ben-Yahav	Shushan																

Jury vote
Episode #:	33			
Day #:	46			
Finalist	Ruslana	Omri	Titi	Tiltil
Votes	4–2–1–1			
Juror	Vote			
Dana				Tiltil
Liron		Omri		
Jenny				Tiltil
Huda				Tiltil
Moshik				Tiltil
Ron S.			Titi	
Omer	Ruslana			
Ron A.			Titi	
