= Survivor: Pearl Islands (Israeli season) =

- Season 2
- Survivor 10: Pearl Islands Logo
- Presented by: Guy Zu-Aretz
- No. of days: 52
- No. of castaways: 20
- Winner: Arik Alper
- Runner-up: Mirit Vaknin
- Location: Pearl Islands, Panama
- No. of episodes: 39

Release
- Original network: Channel 10
- Original release: December 24, 2008 – May 23, 2009

Additional information
- Filming dates: June – July, 2008

Season chronology
- ← Previous; Caribbean Islands Next → The Philippines

Survivor: Pearl Islands (Hebrew: הישרדות איי הפנינה, romanized: Hisardut Iyey HaPnina) is the second season of the Israeli edition of Survivor. The season was filmed during June and July 2008, in the Pearl Islands, Panama. It was aired on Channel 10 from December 24, 2008, until May 23, 2009, when Arik Alper was named the Sole Survivor over Mirit Vaknin. Vaknin was named the audience's favorite player by winning a public vote.

== Format changes ==
This season largely retained the format from the previous season, with several changes:

- Hidden immunity idols: A concept from the American production, hidden immunity idols are small trinkets that, when played on a castaway after the votes were cast at Tribal Council but before they were read, negated all votes cast against them at that Tribal Council.
- Exile Island: Another concept from the American production, Exile Island is a secluded location where castaways were banished from their tribemates for a night or two; in this version, following each Immunity Challenge, two castaways were sent to Exile Island, where they competed in a duel for a clue to a hidden immunity idol.
- Individual immunity challenge and veto challenge: The Double-Power challenge from the previous season was changed. Instead, before the merge, the members of the tribe that lost the immunity challenge competed in a challenge for individual immunity in that night's Tribal Council. After the merge, the castaways competed for the power to block a tribemate from voting in that night's Tribal Council, in the form of a veto bracelet that they would give to the player whose vote they are blocking.
- Endgame: At the end of the game, the remaining castaways were subjected to a public vote. During the live finale months after the game's conclusion, the player with the fewest votes was eliminated, automatically joining the jury. The now-completed jury then cast their votes for the winner, which were read immediately afterward.

== Contestants ==
Contestant	Original tribe	Post-mutiny (Note: After the Exile Island duel on Day 8, exiled castaways Meir and Neta-Li were temporarily switched to the other tribe. On Day 11, Meir and Neta-Li were given the opportunity to return to their original tribe; Neta-Li accepted, but Meir did not, and officially became a member of Caniba.)	Switched tribe	Merged tribe	Finish
Irit Virag; 35, Tel Aviv	Caniba				1st voted out Day 3
Nasrin Ghandour; 27, Haifa	Caniba				2nd voted out Day 6
Gal Erez; 43, Arsuf	Caniba				Medically evacuated Day 7
Sivan Rauch-Kahlon; 23, Neve Yamin	Barú	Barú			3rd voted out Day 12
Meir Tzarfati; 28, Tel Aviv	Barú	Caniba			Disqualified; Day 13
Natan Bashevkin; 28, Nili	Caniba	Caniba			4th voted out Day 15
Maayan Porter; 26, Eilat	Barú	Barú			5th voted out Day 18
Diva Hatami-Goldwasser; 40, Kefar Vitkin	Barú	Barú	Caniba		6th voted out Day 21
Michal Siani; 30, Tel Aviv	Barú	Barú	Caniba		7th voted out Day 24
Mirit Vaknin; Returned to game	Barú	Barú	Caniba		8th voted out Day 27
Efrat Yekutiel; 27, Manhattan, United States	Caniba	Caniba	Barú	Casaya	9th voted out 1st jury member Day 31
Guy Geyor; 28, Tel Aviv	Caniba	Caniba	Caniba	Casaya	10th voted out 2nd jury member Day 34
Idan Haviv; 28, Modi'in-Maccabim-Re'ut	Barú	Barú	Barú	Casaya	11th voted out 3rd jury member Day 37
Anastasia Mirkin; 24, Tirat Carmel	Caniba	Caniba	Barú	Casaya	12th voted out 4th jury member Day 40
Igor Tigner; 28, Herzliya	Barú	Barú	Barú	Casaya	13th voted out 5th jury member Day 43
Ofir Dallal; 33, Tel Aviv	Barú	Barú	Barú	Casaya	14th voted out 6th jury member Day 46
Itay Haephrati; 23, Tel Mond	Caniba	Caniba	Caniba	Casaya	15th voted out 7th jury member Day 49
Yoav Caspi; 26, London, UK	Barú	Barú	Barú	Casaya	Bribed (Note: For winning the final reward challenge, Yoav was given a bribe to leave the game in exchange for a new car; he chose the car.); 8th jury member Day 52
Neta-Li Zelcerman; 27, Tel Aviv	Caniba	Caniba	Barú	Casaya	Eliminated (Note: Neta-Li was eliminated during the live finale by a public vote.); 9th jury member Finale
Mirit Vaknin; 26, Lod	Barú	Barú	Caniba	Casaya	Runner-up
Arik Alper; 34, Tel Aviv	Caniba	Caniba	Caniba	Casaya	Sole Survivor

=== Future appearances ===
Mirit Vaknin, Maayan Porter and Natan Bashevkin returned for Survivor: Fans vs. Survivors. Idan Haviv returned for the 2020 season of Survivor: VIP.

Guy Geyor became the "Bachelor" on the Israeli edition of The Bachelor

== Season summary ==
Pre-merge challenge winners and eliminations by cycle
Episodes		Challenge winner(s)			Exile Island duel		Eliminated	Finish
No.	Original air date	Reward	Tribal immunity	Individual immunity	Winner	Loser	Eliminated	Finish
1 & 2	December 24 & 26, 2008	None	Barú	Guy	Yoav	Nasrin	Irit	1st voted out Day 3
3 & 4	December 31, 2008 & January 2, 2009	Caniba	Barú	Bashevkin	Ofir	Anastasia	Nasrin	2nd voted out Day 6
5 & 6	January 14 & 17, 2009	Caniba	Barú	Guy	Neta-Li	Meir	Gal	Medically evacuated Day 7
7 & 8	January 21 & 24, 2009	Caniba	Caniba	Idan	Arik	Michal	Sivan	3rd voted out Day 12
9 & 10	January 28 & 31, 2009	Caniba	Barú	~~Itay~~ (Note: At Tribal Council, Itay chose to give up his individual immunity.)	Efrat	Idan	Meir	Disqualified; Day 13
9 & 10	January 28 & 31, 2009	Caniba	Barú	~~Itay~~	Efrat	Idan	Bashevkin	4th voted out Day 15
11 & 12	February 4 & 7, 2009	Caniba	Caniba	Igor	Itay	Diva	Maayan	5th voted out Day 18
13 & 14	February 11 & 14, 2009	Caniba	Barú	Michal	Michal	Ofir	Diva	6th voted out Day 21
15 & 16	February 18 & 21, 2009	Barú	Barú	Itay	Igor	Guy	Michal	7th voted out Day 24
17 & 18	February 25 & 28, 2009	Caniba	Barú	Guy	Idan	Arik	Mirit	8th voted out Day 27

Post-merge challenge winners and eliminations by cycle
Episodes		Challenge winner(s)			Exile Island duel		Eliminated	Finish
No.	Original air date	Reward	Immunity	Veto	Winner	Loser	Eliminated	Finish
20, 21 & 22 (Note: Episode 19, which aired on February 28, 2009, was a recap episode.)	March 7, 11 & 14, 2009	Caniba	Mirit (Note: The eliminated contestants had been given the opportunity to remain in the game, living on a secluded beach as the Santiago tribe. At the merge, the Santiago tribe members — Bashevkin, Maayan, Diva, Michal and Mirit — competed against each other to return to the game; Mirit won, earning immunity at the next Tribal Council as a result.)	Itay	Mirit	Arik	Efrat	9th voted out 1st jury member Day 31
20, 21 & 22	March 7, 11 & 14, 2009	Caniba	Itay	Itay	Mirit	Arik	Efrat	9th voted out 1st jury member Day 31
23 & 24	March 21 & 25, 2009	Idan (Igor)	Itay	Idan	Arik	Mirit	Guy	10th voted out 2nd jury member Day 34
25 & 26	March 28 & April 4, 2009	Idan	Igor	Anastasia	Idan	Yoav	Idan	11th voted out 3rd jury member Day 37
27 & 28	April 11 & 15, 2009	Igor (Itay, Mirit, Yoav) (Note: Igor was given the right to share his reward with three others; they then became one team for the upcoming immunity challenge, with the other four remaining castaways becoming the other team.)	Igor, Itay, Mirit, Yoav	Igor	Arik, Neta-Li (Note: The Exile Island challenge was collaborative.)	None	Anastasia	12th voted out 4th jury member Day 40
29 & 30	April 18 & 22, 2009	Survivor; Auction	Itay	Mirit	Arik, Neta-Li	None	Igor	13th voted out 5th jury member Day 43
31 & 32	April 25 & 29, 2009	~~Arik~~ (Note: Arik chose to give up his reward to the rest of the tribe.)	Itay	Ofir	Arik	Neta-Li	Ofir	14th voted out 6th jury member Day 46
33 & 34	May 2 & 6, 2009	Itay (Arik)	Neta-Li	Yoav	Arik, Itay	None	Itay	15th voted out 7th jury member Day 49
35 & 37 (Note: Episode 36, which aired on May 13, 2009, was a recap episode.)	May 9 & 16, 2009	Yoav (Note: For winning the final reward challenge, Yoav was given a bribe to leave the game in exchange for a new car; he chose the car.)	~~Yoav~~ (Arik) (Note: At Tribal Council, Yoav chose to give his individual immunity to Arik.)	Mirit	None		Yoav	Bribed; 8th jury member Day 52
38	May 23, 2009						Neta-Li	Eliminated (Note: Neta-Li was eliminated during the live finale by a public vote.); 9th jury member Finale
38	May 23, 2009						Jury vote	
38	May 23, 2009						Mirit	Runner-up
38	May 23, 2009						Arik	Sole Survivor

== Survivor Auction ==
Contestants	Item(s)
Arik	Buffalo wings, French fries
Igor	Coconuts, The service of Alejandro
Itay	Falafel and Tahina, Baby doll (gave to Neta-Lee)
Mirit	Huge American waffle
Neta-Li	A bottle of rum
Ofir	Fishing kit, Cold Pinacolada
Yoav	Israeli sand & water

== Episode summaries ==
No. overall	No. in season	Title	Original release date
37	1	"Episode 1"	December 24, 2008
20 Israelis were given three minutes to pack up their belongings before being flown out to the Pearl Islands and divided into two tribes: Caniba and Baru. They then went to a local market to buy supplies. Efrat was very aggressive with the local men, causing two somewhat tense confrontations, but they eventually helped her team. On the boat ride to the islands, Meir convinced the driver to siphon gas from the boat and give it to them. At camp, Caniba tried fishing then later celebrated with wine and sang. Baru argued with each other over the shelter but came together around the campfire. Natan and Nasrin (Caniba Tribe) had conflict, and the tribe had trouble sleeping on the ground; Efrat slept in a big treasure chest that held their supplies. The girls of Baru trapped a pelican and took it to camp as a pet. For the immunity challenge, the players had to crawl under a wooden rack in the mud, finish a tilting maze board and get the ball inside to fall into a bag, and cross a balance beam. Nasrin took her time on the balance beam, angering her teammates. Baru won the challenge and got to send one player from Caniba to Exile: they chose Nasrin. They then had to send one of their own, so they sent Yoav.
38	2	"Episode 2"	December 26, 2008
Baru returned to camp after Immunity and found that the tide had risen and ruined everything, including their matches. At Caniba, Guy, Natan, Irit, Itay and Efrat formed an alliance around the campfire. Gal woke up and heard their plotting to vote out Nasrin. At Exile Island, Yoav and Nasrin competed in a tile-breaking competition using slingshots. Yoav won a key which opened a chest containing a clue for an idol hidden back at his tribe camp. When Nasrin returned to Caniba, Arik looked through her bag, supposing she found an idol. Later, Gal and Arik observed the alliance of Irit, Natan, Guy and Itay and struck a deal on the beach with each other. At Caniba's Individual Immunity challenge, Itay won but made a mistake, making Guy the winner. Afterwards, Gal pulled Efrat aside at camp and persuaded her to join him in a deal which they shook on. At Tribal Council, Irit and Nasrin were the center of the conversation. Both of them made comments which raised eyebrows and bothered other people. Gal and Neta-Li clashed with Irit, while Nasrin seemed outcast by the entire tribe. In the end, however, Efrat sided with the rest of the tribe against Irit and Irit was voted out 6–4.
39	3	"Episode 3"	December 31, 2008
At the Baru camp, Sivan was suffering a lot, putting a big target on her. Michal was outcast by the girls and found comfort with Meir after a tearful conversation. Ofir told his tribe that he was gay. At night, Ofir tried to look for the Immunity Idol hidden at camp (which Yoav told his tribe about). At Caniba, Efrat made up with Guy and Natan, whom she turned on at Tribal Council when she voted out Irit. Nasrin still could not get along well with anyone in her team and eventually burst into tears privately. Caniba won the reward challenge but lost immunity for the second time. Baru sent Anastasia to Exile, along with Ofir from their own team. When Baru got back to camp, Meir collapsed.
40	4	"Episode 4"	January 1, 2009
At Baru, Meir recovered from his collapse; The tribe finally made fire after earlier losing it; when they tried to use some of the gas they siphoned from the boat from the start of the game, the fire went out of control and they had to immediately put out several small fires when the gasoline spilled. At Caniba, Nasrin continued to alienate herself; the alliance of Natan, Efrat, Itay and Guy was solidified; Gal continued to speak in private with Efrat and Natan. Efrat told Nasrin that Guy was going home and later lies about it at Tribal Council. On Exile Island, Ofir won the challenge against Anastasia. Natan won Individual Immunity and Caniba went to Tribal Council, where Nasrin and Gal argued at length with each other. Nasrin's difficulty getting along with the team has to do with cultural differences (her being an Arab) and she is hurt to hear Gal saying it out loud. Also, Efrat is outed as a liar and Guy says he does not trust her. After all of the conflict with her team, Nasrin was voted out 8–1.
41	5	"Episode 5"	January 14, 2009
Following Tribal Council, the Caniba tribe returned happily to the camp, feeling that they finally were united after voting out Nasrin, who drew a lot of fire and negativity towards herself by distancing herself from the rest of her tribe-mates. The tribe discussed voting her out, and generally were in a good mood leading up to the next day's reward challenge. The Reward Challenge was a blind-fold challenge, with Gal and Mirit chosen to lead their friends blindly to find eight puzzle pieces. After falling behind, Gal calmly led his team to victory, as Mirit failed to control her team eventually, and Caniba also aided by misdirecting them. Following the challenge, where Caniba won ten pineapples, and chose to give two to Baru), Meir failed to control himself and immediately went on a mad rant, even going as far as to say that he had had enough of everyone there, and said that he did not care if he got voted out. After Baru returned from losing the challenge, Meir again tried to cause chaos, and after shouting a lot without any reason, went to Maayan, Mirit, Michal and Sivan and said that Diva needs to be taken out of the game. Nobody agreed with him, and Meir felt that if Baru lost immunity, he would be on the chopping block. In the midst of all the chaos on the beach, Ofir went off alone into the Jungle in search of the Hidden Immunity Idol, and within a few minutes, after figuring out the meaning of the clues, he found a hole in the ground, in a tree near the water, and retrieved the Hidden Immunity Idol. He decided he would not tell anyone. Back at Caniba, they enjoyed their victory by slicing open their newly-won pineapples, and went into the sea to talk. While in the sea, Gal was stung apparently by a stingray and after bleeding heavily, and passing out, he was evacuated from the Island by an emergency rescue crew. The Caniba tribe was broken and saddened, but they banded together and said that they would win the Immunity Challenge. At the Immunity Challenge, Caniba and Baru faced off in a battle of balance on a rolling log. After a few close rounds and exchanges, Michal from Baru went up and simply destroyed the Caniba tribe, beating them in ten consecutive rounds, single-handedly winning immunity for her tribe. Meir from Baru and Neta-Li from Caniba were selected to go to Exile Island. It was announced that they would return to the opposing tribe that they were at, therefore forcing a tribe-swap.
42	6	"Episode 6"	January 17, 2009
The episode begins with the challenge between the two exiled castaways, Neta-Li and Meir. Neta-Li manages to beat Meir, and gets a clue to the Hidden Immunity Idol, but she did not know that Ofir already had found it. Meir and Neta-Li then swapped tribes. At the Caniba tribe, the girls, Efrat and Anastasia, were outnumbered by the five guys (Itay, Guy, Bashevkin, Meir, and Arik). At the Baru tribe, Neta-Li's arrival brought much excitement to camp, and everyone was glad that Meir left, due to his previous outbursts. At the individual immunity challenge, Anastasia played it hard, but Guy just beat her, saving him once again from the vote at tribal. Before tribal council the tribe planned to single out Anastasia as the weak-link. At tribal council, the guys said some harsh things about Anastasia, saying she was giving orders but not working as hard herself. But Anastasia was saved when the Caniba tribe watched a videotape of Gal who was evacuated and was in a hospital, where he asked them to "vote him out as one", everyone agreed and no-one was voted out.
43	7	"Episode 7"	January 22, 2009
After a dramatic tribal council, Caniba returned to camp in a very weird mood filled with mixed emotions but decide that they need to pull themselves together for the upcoming challenges. The next morning, Arik calls Efrat to the side to strategize with her, where he tells her that Meir is disturbing the tribe and causing the guys to rule over the underdogs, him, Efrat, and Anastasia. They both decide that Meir needs to be the next one to go. At Baru, Sivan's weak personality starts to annoy some of her tribemates, Idan and Igor. She cried over the hunger at the tribe, and together everyone decided that they needed this reward. At the reward challenge, the castaways were given a shot at deciding what the reward will be, by sending one person to the enemy's tribe and taking one item from them. The first two rounds of the challenge, ended in a tie. The guys fought for the pillow, but no one managed to bring the pillow back to the tribe mat. At the women's round, Anastasia was left on her own to battle against Maayan from Baru (after Efrat and Diva were disqualified) where she proved to her tribe that she was physically stronger than they had thought. Even though she came short from scoring the final point, it ended up a tie. At the tie-breaker Caniba defeated Baru, and chose to send Meir back to his old tribe for "revenge". It was decided that Meir would take rice from the Baru camp but he failed to do so when his old tribemates tricked him when they said their rice was swept away by the storm, even though it really was not. The Caniba tribemates were mad at Meir for being able to fall for such a lie, and thrived to have him out next. Before the immunity challenge, Meir and Neta-Li were given a choice to go back to their original tribe or stay in their new one. Neta-Li gladly returned to Caniba and Meir stayed, because he hated the Baru members. At the immunity challenge it was close, but Caniba's teamwork and physical ability lead them to win their first immunity challenge. Guy got bread and butter for his birthday, as Baru finally got their flint, even though they had not won a single reward challenge yet. Michal and Arik were chosen to be sent to Exile Island.
44	8	"Episode 8"	January 24, 2009
Caniba came back to camp with the bread and butter that they had won and celebrated Guy's birthday together, and Efrat mentioned she could finally stop scheming. At Baru, the feeling was different after the immunity challenge. Even though they had won flint, the tribe was sad because of their first tribal council. Idan and Diva formed a tight relationship, and Igor also bonded with them. At Exile Island, Arik defeated Michal and got the clue to hidden immunity idol back at his camp, and some chocolates in which he shared with Michal. Michal gave half of her chocolate to her tribemates back at Baru, to help bond with them, knowing she was on the outs. At Caniba, Arik used the chocolate for strategic purposes, and helped gain favor from the tribe. At Baru's individual immunity challenge, vegetarian Diva beat out everyone except Idan, filling her plate with 2.5 kg of meat, but Idan had 3.4 kg, thus ensuring his safety at Tribal. Before Tribal Council, Ofir went out on a limb for Michal, persuading the guys to vote Sivan. Idan then went to Diva and she agreed to vote with him too, even though her hatred towards Michal. The plan worked, and Ofir smiled to see Sivan go home.
45	9	"Episode 9"	January 28, 2009
After having difficulty falling asleep, Meir went to the local boat drivers and asked them to drive him away from the camp; they disagreed and he began cursing them. His tribemates were mad at him, and did their best to stay as far away as possible from him. At the reward challenge, the host said the Meir was disqualified for his actions the night before, narrowing down Caniba to seven members. Caniba then went on to dominate the challenge, and won some construction tools, and then Baru tribe as their servants for the day. Baru was displeased with their loss, but had to become Caniba's servants for a day. Efrat was arrogant around camp, handing out a lot of jobs and asked for massages, Arik said that her attitude would hurt her in the merge. When Baru came back to camp the next day, they decided they had enough of losing to Caniba, and had to win the next Immunity Challenge. At the immunity challenge, the teams had to place sacks of heavy sand onto three castaways from the opponent's team's backs, until they fell. Caniba immediately lost Itay and Efrat and Baru lost Ofir. Guy was left fighting for the tribe against the two strongest members of Baru; Idan and Mirit. Guy fell down after 80 kg of sand was put on his back, thus Baru won immunity.
46	10	"Episode 10"	January 31, 2009
Caniba returned to camp, upset at the end of their winning streak. Arik caused trouble around camp after he strategized with Bashevkin and then ratted him out to Guy and Itay; everyone agreed that Bashevkin had dug his own grave. Efrat was sent to Exile Island to fight against Idan from Baru; she beat him and got the clue to the hidden Immunity Idol. At night, a romance between Idan and Efrat began, and Efrat came back to Caniba's camp in love. Her tribemates immediately noticed it and began to not trust her. At Baru, Maayan and Igor connected while speaking Russian together. Their other tribemates were okay with the feeling, but Diva was jealous of the new couples forming. At the individual immunity challenge, Efrat, Arik, and Guy decided to give up their shot and let Itay win so Bashevkin could go home, but Bashevkin and Itay saw through Arik's performance. Before Tribal Council, Itay told Guy that the women's alliance (Efrat, Neta-Li, and Anastasia) was too strong and had to be broken. Together they planned to take out Neta-Li with Bashevkin. Then they went to Arik and asked him to vote for her too. With Arik as the counter vote at tribal, Bashevkin decided to target Neta-Li and reveal Guy and Itay's plans. Neta-Li fought back but her tribe was mad at her for always talking back and not willing to shut up. When the host asked Itay if he wanted to give up his immunity necklace, he said yes.
47	11	"Episode 11"	February 4, 2009
Itay chose to make the vote a bit more fair, and chose to give up his immunity. After the votes were revealed, Bashevkin was eliminated. The Caniba tribe was much better off without Bashevkin; they went on to dominate the reward challenge, winning a king-sized bed with candles for their camp, which they all enjoyed that night. At Baru, Maayan and Igor's relationship grew, but Michal was getting outcast by her tribe, so Ofir took her aside to help her. At the immunity challenge, Baru chose to sit out their strongest member, Idan, and were left without any physically strong players, therefore Caniba, once again dominated thanks to Neta-Li's great goalkeeping and Anastasia strong attacking. Diva and Itay were sent to Exile Island.
48	12	"Episode 12"	February 7, 2009
After Baru lost the challenge, Igor began complaining, and he caused mixed emotions when he said he wouldn't mind getting rid of some people like Michal, right in front of her face. Michal then went with Ofir to the side and together they formed an alliance and decided to help each other stay in the game. Ofir then went to the angered Igor and told him that Maayan had been planning to get rid of him all the time they were friends. Igor bought the lie that Ofir made up and told everyone else except Mirit and Maayan what happened. Igor then went to Maayan and told her that she was backstabbing him as a friend. He said "Maayan, go search for your friends and leave me and Diva alone". Maayan then went crying to Mirit asking her why everyone suddenly hated her. At the Exile Island duel, both contestants had a paintball gun and had to shoot each other. Itay easily beat Diva and got the clue to the hidden Immunity Idol. At night, Diva began to flirt with Itay, and he then understood how she has so much power and control in the Baru tribe. At Caniba, the girls did nothing all day. Anastasia, Neta-Li, and Efrat were so confident in their alliance with Arik that they knew that they had the numbers, and Itay and Guy would have to work hard to stay in the game. Even though Arik was mad at the girls, he still didn't agree to cause a tie if there was a tribal council. When Diva returned to the Baru camp she was greeted by her "lion alliance" (Igor, Idan, and Yoav) with hugs and kisses. Michal complained about Diva's attitude, and if the lie was true she would side with Maayan to get rid of her, but only if it were to be true. At the individual immunity challenge, the castaways had to hang upside down on a bar, last person to stay up wins. The girls and Yoav went out after 15 minutes and left Maayan hanging for her life. Maayan complained that she had suddenly become on the chopping block and asked everyone why, but no one answered. Mirit was the only one who cheered Maayan at the challenge. When Maayan fell after 35 minutes, the guys respectively went down together, but Igor was the last to hit the ground, so he won immunity. At Tribal Council some harsh things were said about Maayan. Ofir made sure that the whole discussion was around Maayan so everyone would forget outcast Michal. But Maayan and Mirit teared away, completely frightened by what mean lies Ofir and Michal said about Maayan. Even though Diva and Idan still wanted to get rid of Michal, Maayan was voted out in a vote of 6–2, with only Mirit on her side.
49	13	"Episode 13"	February 11, 2009
After Maayan's elimination, Idan comforted Mirit. At the reward challenge, the tribes were swapped: Guy, Itay, Arik, Michal, Mirit and Diva became the new Caniba tribe, while Idan, Ofir, Yoav, Igor, Neta-Li, Efrat and Anastasia formed the new Baru. Caniba won the challenge and decided to give some of the reward to Baru. At the new Caniba tribe, the former Baru women were very happy and started to work. The guys in Caniba were very happy and surprised with the Baru girls. Only Diva felt very lonely and sad because of losing her alliance and knowing she might be next to go. At the new Baru tribe, the Caniba girls were disappointed and Igor was angry because of it. Before the immunity challenge Idan suggested the tribe lose in the challenge to save Diva but Igor and Ofir did not agree. At the immunity challenge Arik from Caniba and Efrat from Baru were the leaders. While Arik lost on purpose to save the Caniba girls and vote out Diva, Idan was both happy and sad. Baru won some fish and Ofir and Michal were sent to exile island.
50	14	"Episode 14"	February 14, 2009
The episode began with Caniba coming back to camp after another loss. Diva was sure that the boys from Baru would have lost to keep her safe but they won so she knew she might be going home. At Baru the feeling was different, everyone was happy, especially the girls originally from Caniba. Igor found a dirty brazent in the jungle and brought it to camp, just making their lifestyle better and stronger. At exile Island, the two allies Michal and Ofir met and planned their next move. They decided it was time for sneaky Diva to go home. After the dangerous move they made with Maayan they were sure they could pull this off. Ofir already had the Hidden Immunity Idol from Baru so he lost the challenge on purposes, giving Michal the clue for the idol. When Michal returned to Caniba she told the guys a lie, saying that the original Caniba girls (Effie, Anastasia, and Neta-Li) said they were useless and never brought fish and that they were happy to be on their new tribe. That heated up the boys, making them mad. But Diva caught Michal in the lie and said Ofir can not be trusted, meaning that what he told her was probably false. Diva, knowing she was next to go planned a new "guy's alliance" with Itay, Guy, and Arik. They bonded and decided Michal and Mirit were the next to go home. When Ofir returned to Baru, he told the truth. The boys from Caniba (Guy, Arik, and Itay) said that Anastasia did nothing around camp, Effie only slept, and that Neta-Li was a fat non-stop eating machine. Neta-Li was very offended by this and worried. But Effie and Anastasia stayed calm. At the individual Immunity Challenge, it was Michal's zone. Balance. Michal outlasted every one on her tribe and won immunity. Back at camp, Diva knew she was next so she talked to Arik targeting Guy. But the plan did not work and Diva was voted out by her tribe. Mirit said it was "revenge" for the move they made with Maayan.
51	15	"Episode 15"	February 19, 2009
The episode began with Caniba returning from Tribal Council happy with the decision they had made about cutting Diva's dream. At Baru Igor and Idan, Diva's best friends and alliance mates started to worry about her. When they came to the reward challenge they found out she had been voted off and were extremely angry, and decided to fight hard this time. The tribes fought over a delicious meal of steaks, potatoes, and vegetables but ultimately it was Baru who finally won their first reward challenge. Then they were given an option to trade the reward in for a box, and that Caniba would get the reward. They agreed and got the box, which had Noam, the runner-up from the previous season. They were all happy, but Caniba was too. For extra flavor they got a dessert, which was brought in by Moshe, another contestant from the previous season. The two tribes got Noam and Moshe for the day and for the Immunity Challenge. At the Immunity Challenge, Noam led Baru to yet another win over Caniba. Ofir was injured during the challenge but returned in the end. Igor and Guy were exiled.
52	16	"Episode 16"	February 21, 2009
Michal returned to camp certain that Mirit was going home, but knew she was on the chopping block. Meanwhile, Moshe, who was "the reward" they earned from the challenge, flirted with the girls. Arik was worried and wanted Mirit out because she was closest to him. But Moshe had plans to mix things up at Tribal and vote out Arik. At Baru, Anastasia had an emotional moment with her tribe. She said that today, she was supposed to marry her fiancé, Tal, but decided to delay the wedding for the adventure of her lifetime. She cried, but her tears were understood by her tribe, especially by Efrat, Neta-Li, and Noam, "the reward" that Baru won at the reward challenge. At the individual Immunity challenge that Caniba had before tribal, Arik helped Itay win again. Itay claimed he was liked by the tribe, and because of that he had been winning a lot. Moshe was upset and decided to target Arik, but Guy had other plans, he and Itay decided it was time to get rid of Michal, who was lying left to right to both tribes she had been on. At tribal council Michal noticed that the boys weren't trusting her and in the end she was voted off 4-1 by her tribe. Moshe left after Tribal Council.
53	17	"Episode 17"	February 25, 2009
At the beginning of the episode Mirit was glad that she was saved at Tribal Council. The guys were also proud about their choice. At Baru the original Baru members Igor and Idan were worried about the girl's alliance and decided to break Neta-Li and Efrat's alliance with Anastasia by making a new alliance. Idan persuaded Efrat and Neta-Li to join them but Ofir caught the exchangement. He decided that it was time to break up the new alliance. The reward for the challenge was cereal at a luxurious breakfast at the tribes' camps. The Caniba 4 defeated Baru 7 and managed to stay strong. At the Immunity Challenge Caniba led for the first part, but due to Arik complaining about his pain, they lost and were sent packing. Before the challenge Anastasia whispered to Arik "lose the challenge" and "you know what to do", but Arik's tribemates saw this and were shocked.
54	18	"Episode 18"	February 28, 2009
Back at Baru, Ofir targeted Idan and Igor when he told Neta-Li a lie that they had been planning to backstab her. Neta-Li caught the lie and told the guys, and Ofir was in trouble. Ofir decided to set up a new plot to get rid of Neta-Li. Ofir, who had the Hidden Immunity Idol, and knew where it was hid, went "searching" for it and "accidentally" bumped into it, but after such a short time, that Igor, Idan, and Yoav noticed that it was probably another one of his lies. Ofir claimed Neta-Li had the idol, but no one bought the story. At Baru it was Mirit and Arik on the chopping block. Arik was worried he had lost contact with the guys and decided to try bonding with them, which did not work at all. At the individual Immunity challenge, Mirit was confident she would win but after a muddy challenge Guy won and chose to take Mirit with him to bath of the mud from the challenge as part of an extra reward. Before Tribal Council Arik went searching for the idol but came up short. During Tribal Council Mirit brought up some harsh things about Arik, but he managed to stay calm. Guy and Itay just nearly bought his fake story about Anastasia whispered to him at the challenge. But after the votes were revealed it was Mirit who was voted out 3-1.
55	19	" What Happened at Santiago"	March 4, 2009
A recap of the first 30 days, including new footage of the eliminated contestants as they formed the new Santiago tribe.
56	20	"Episode 20"	March 7, 2009
The episode began with the Caniba 3 (Arik, Guy, and Itay) complaining, but also being happy that they were the only members left on Caniba. At Baru, The girls remained happy and were glad that they were seven strong Baru members, but at the same time missed the Caniba boys. Tree mail was a reward challenge. The Caniba tribe was depressed that there wasn't a merge at 10. At the reward challenge, Efrat, Idan, Anastasia, and Yoav were forced to sit out, due to them playing at the last challenge, leaving Igor, Ofir, and Neta-Li to work together. They did not succeed in finding the winning statement which was "One for all, all for one, Welcome to the merged tribe". Caniba won the prize, which was juice, but shared it with Baru since there was the merge time. The merged tribe's name was Casaya, named after the island the castaways would live in. The Casaya tribe celebrated the merge at a Panamanian Mansion with hot tubs, baths, food and luxury items from home. The Casaya tribe later on returned to a completely new island and camp. Arik tried to rebond with the former Caniba girls, Anastasia, Neta-Li, and Efrat, who were in a difficult situation whom to go with: Baru or Caniba. Efrat and Anastasia wanted to go with Baru but Neta-Li disagreed. Arik lied to the girls and told them he lost the past immunities on purpose but Anastasia caught the lie. At the Individual Immunity Challenge, the host introduced the Santiago tribe — composed of eliminated contestants Bashevkin, Michal, Mirit, Diva, and Maayan — and revealed that the winner of their challenge would return to the game with immunity.
57	21	"Episode 21"	March 11, 2009
The Santiago tribe's challenge was about a pirate named Henry Morgan. The outcasts were forced to remember the story in order to win. Mirit answered every question right and was brought back into the game, earning immunity at the next tribal council. Back at Casaya, Mirit immediately went to work with telling her tribemates that Arik wasn't the sweet little boy next door but a snake in the grass. She told Itay and Guy that he wasn't trustable and they knew that Mirit was more trustable than him. In the morning Ofir woke up to form an alliance with Arik, which he nearly succeeded but Arik decided not to, only take his 'new alliance' with Ofir as a backup plan. At the Individual Immunity Challenge, the castaways were set underwater with minimum space to breathe between bars and the last to stand would win safety. Idan knew his alliance with Efrat, Igor, and Neta-Li was strong (with Anastasia in the curtains) so he didn't give it his all. Yoav was the first out after 10 minutes, Arik, Efrat, Neta-Li, and Mirit after him. Anastasia was left the only girl running for Immunity. Everyone was surprised that she managed to outlast half of the tribe. Anastasia hung in with the guys quite a while, but after 40 minutes, she understood that if she stood any longer she would be targeted as a physical threat and decided to quit. Igor then went after her. Ofir also. Idan, Guy, and Itay were left in the water. When Guy went out, Idan knew that one of Caniba's physical threats was out and decided to quit himself, thus giving Itay Immunity Itay decided to send Arik to Exile Island, and Arik chose to take Mirit with him.
58	22	"Episode 22"	March 14, 2009
At Exile Island Arik and Mirit battled for a clue of the Hidden Immunity Idol, which this time was rehidden at Exile Island. Mirit won the challenge but shared the clue with Arik, but they didn't succeed in finding the idol, instead they formed an alliance. Back at camp, Efrat began to criticize Neta-Li's boyfriend and Neta-Li got very offended. In the morning, the two girls wouldn't speak to each other, and Neta-Li told Anastasia all the negative comments Efrat had said about them since Day 1. Anastasia and Neta-Li decided Efrat was going to be the next to go and together they joined forces with Itay, Guy, Mirit, and Arik. Then a new challenge was announced, the Veto challenge, the castaway that one chooses one person that will not vote at the coming Tribal Council. The challenge was in rounds. In the first round Efrat, Yoav, Igor, Itay, and Anatassia managed to remove a small item from a woven piece of ropes. In the second round Itay succeeded in dragging the anchor to the finish line first and won the Veto Armlet. He chose to cancel Ofir's Vote. Before Tribal Efrat began to annoy everyone. Idan totally lost all of her trust when she said to Guy she was voting Idan. But she told Idan she would be voting Guy. At Tribal Council Itay, Guy, and Arik brought up some harsh things about Efrat, but she managed to stay calm and still remain part of the Baru alliance without any damage. But in the end, Efrat's attitude got on everyone's nerves and she was voted off 6-4 and became the first member of the Jury.
59	23	"Episode 23"	March 21, 2009
Everyone came back to camp after a very troubled Tribal Council. Igor and Idan were mad that the girls had betrayed them, and decided not to trust Anastasia and Neta-Li anymore. At the Reward Challenge, Idan managed to make a small comeback after falling behind early on. He chose Igor to drink some beer for the reward, while back at camp Neta-Li and Anastasia planned to stick with Caniba. At the Immunity Challenge, Itay hung on to the necklace, and chose to send Arik, who chose Mirit to go with him to Exile Island.
60	24	"Episode 24"	March 25, 2009
Guy felt confident that he and Itay were ruling the game. They knew Idan was the next to go. But other things were going on to make the situation tough at Casaya. Igor and Neta-Li began to fight about who is a bigger backstabber. Neta-Li claimed Igor was a trashy person, while Igor said Neta-Li was just garbage. At Exile Island Arik proved that he could beat Mirit at challenges, and he won a clue to the Hidden Immunity Idol hidden on Exile Island. They searched together, but when Mirit got tired she stopped searching and they decided to come back some other time. That night at Casaya, the merged tribe, Igor and Idan tried to make a deal with Guy and Itay to vote off Neta-Li. They didn't agree. At the Veto challenge, Idan wasn't afraid of the dangerous tarantulas and won the armlet. He used it to cancel Guy's vote later on. A twist was revealed after the challenge. A new hidden Immunity Idol was hidden back at Casaya, the 1st, 2nd, 3rd, and 4th-place winners in the Veto challenge got a clue to it (Idan, Igor, Yoav, and Anastasia – in order). While Yoav and Igor searched for the idol, Idan guarded Anastasia and made sure she didn't find the idol. She didn't, but Igor did. At Tribal Council, Igor turned the heat towards Neta-Li. Efrat, the first jury member, sat laughing at Tribal Council quietly. A weird argument went on whether Caniba was playing a fair game, Arik claimed that 'it was just a game' – and backstabbing is part of it. In the end, Caniba all voted for Idan, but Igor gave him the Hidden Immunity Idol to play at Tribal Council, thus sending Guy home to become the second member of the jury.
61	25	"Episode 25"	March 28, 2009
Anastasia and Neta-Li were shocked because of the last blindside at Tribal Council. At the reward Challenge, Idan won 15 minutes of phone line to speak with his loved ones. He chose to share it evenly between everyone. Yoav had a dramatic moment with his girlfriend, Jackie, who lives in London, while Neta-Li has a sad moment, when her boyfriend wasn't talking with her, but she got over it within minutes. Back at camp, Igor got mad at Ofir. He began to search Ofir's bags, but was unable to find his hidden immunity idol, and got mad at Ofir for hiding the Idol from his alliance. At the Immunity Challenge, Igor stayed balanced and won immunity. He sent Idan and Yoav to search for the Hidden Immunity Idol.
62	26	"Episode 26"	April 4, 2009
Yoav and Idan battled it out on Exile Island for the hint to the Hidden Immunity Idol in a challenge that required taking apart a tower one piece at a time, with the first person to make it fall, losing the challenge. After Idan won, and he and Yoav spent a night of good camaraderie on Exile Island, they searched together when morning broke. After following and finding a few more hints, they found the Hidden Immunity Idol buried in the sand near a bush, and celebrated. Back at camp, Ofir said that he would find out whether or not they found the Idol, and they would plan their tactics around that, with the primary goal being to vote Idan off. At the Veto challenge, a game of "true or false" trivia took place in regards to current events happening off the Island, which Anastasia won. Following the challenge, the Caniba alliance conspired and thought about their tactics, with Ofir using his alliance with the former Baru boys to find out that Idan indeed had found the Idol on Exile Island. Ofir told the ex-Caniba members of this, while promising that he was with the ex-Baru members every step of the way. Arik told Idan that he was indeed the target at Tribal Council to confuse him, and Idan, Igor and Yoav agreed that Idan would use the Idol for himself, and cancel out the votes towards him. At Tribal Council, Ofir made a few remarks that foreshadowed his turn on the ex-Baru members, and, following Anastasia giving Yoav the armlet that cancelled his vote, Idan thought that Yoav was the target, and decided to use the Immunity Idol to save Yoav. At Tribal Council, Yoav played his idol, negating the three votes cast against him, but the Caniba alliance had split their votes between him and Idan, and Idan was eliminated with three votes. Igor questioned Ofir about who he voted for, to which he answered "Idan", with a huge grin.
63	27	"Episode 27"	April 11, 2009
Igor and Yoav came back to camp about tribal council, where Caniba's plan to vote out Idan was executed successfully. Igor got mad and began saying very racist comments, disrespecting the girls' decision, and also laughing about Ofir's homosexuality. He began planning out a new alliance with Itay and Mirit and made it clear to everyone that his target was Ofir. At the reward challenge, the castaways played for a picnic. Igor easily won the challenge and chose Mirit, Itay, and Yoav to join him on the picnic. Then the host said that the 4 castaways going to the picnic will be one team in the upcoming Immunity challenge, while the others will be a different one, the Immunity will be given to the winning team at the Immunity Challenge. At the picnic, Yoav and Igor planned a Final 4 alliance with Itay and Mirit, where they said that Ofir has got to be the next to go home. Mirit agreed but Itay was not confident that joining the former Baru members would be the right decision to make. Back at camp, Arik planned his final 4 alliance with Anastasia, Neta-Li and Ofir. Ofir went out searching for food in the jungle and came back with a huge sack of Pacifloras. Arik claimed that Neta-Li did not even care about Ofir, she only cared about the fruits, and was the first one to taste them. At the Immunity Challenge, Anastasia struggled to dive into the deep water to get a numbered coconut, causing Mirit, Igor, Yoav, and Itay to win Immunity. Arik and Neta-Li were exiled.
64	28	"Episode 28"	April 15, 2009
On Exile Island, the challenge was collaborative as Arik and Neta-Li fought together to receive a clue. They won the challenge and both received a clue, but they were unable to make fire and Neta-Li claimed to not have enough strength to find the idol. Back at camp, Ofir knew he was the next to go due to Arik's alliance with Anastasia and Neta-Li, and unsuccessfully tried to sway the votes against Anastasia. At the Veto Challenge, the castaways competed against each other to eat local delicacies faster; Igor beat Ofir in the final round to win. Back at camp, Ofir told Arik he had found Baru's Hidden Immunity Idol and was going to use it at Tribal Council. He told Arik to vote Neta-Li, and make a new alliance between him, Ofir, and Anastasia. Ofir then went to say goodbye to his tribemates before getting voted out. At Tribal Council, Igor and Yoav targeted Anastasia. They stated she wanted to vote for Arik, but Anastasia claimed she wasn't intending to do so. Arik questioned Ofir's loyalty to him, but the tribe was already sure that Ofir was not trustworthy. But before the votes were revealed, Ofir played his Hidden Immunity Idol and, with Itay and Arik's votes against her, Anastasia was voted out.
65	29	"Episode 29"	April 18, 2009
Neta-Li was sad she has lost her best friend on the island, Anastasia, but knew that in order to win she had to move on. Neta-Li decided to make up with Igor, but he rebuffed her attempt. Neta-Li, furious with Igor's attitude, plotted to vote him out next, to which everyone agreed but Yoav, Igor's closest ally. At the Survivor Auction, the castaways bid on food, drinks and luxuries. Back at camp, Neta-Li devised a plan to hinder Igor's chances in the next day's immunity challenge by giving him lots of the rum that she bought at the auction; a drunken Igor passed out underneath a tree. The next morning, he woke up hungover, and Itay won the immunity challenge. Arik and Neta-Li were exiled.
66	30	"Episode 30"	April 22, 2009
On Exile Island, Arik and Neta-Li worked together to win the collaborative challenge to earn a clue to the hidden immunity idol, but were unable to find it. Neta-Li won the veto challenge. Before Tribal Council, Mirit and Itay considered sparing Igor and instead voting out Yoav for being the larger threat to win. At Tribal Council, Neta-Li and Igor continued to argue; while Mirit and Itay voted against Yoav, Igor voted against Arik and was voted out with the other three votes.
67	31	"Episode 31"	April 25, 2009
While a joyful Neta-Li thought that things would be more calm after Igor's elimination, she was proven wrong when Ofir started arguing with Yoav; Yoav realized that he was likely the majority alliance's next target. At the reward challenge, the castaways played with their loved ones: Neta-Li's mother, Arik's sister, Ofir's ex-boyfriend, Yoav's girlfriend, Itay's brother and Mirit's mother. For winning the challenge, Arik and his sister won a night in a 5-star Panamanian hotel. Arik was given the choice to give up his reward to everyone else; against his tribe mates' protestations, he gave up the reward. The other castaways and their loved ones celebrated, while Arik spent the night alone at camp. Itay won the immunity challenge, and sent Arik and Neta-Li back to Exile Island.
68	32	"Episode 32"	April 29, 2009
At Exile Island, Arik beat Neta-Li for the clue to the idol; they again searched together, but were again unsuccessful. Back at camp, Ofir made a deal with Mirit to eliminate Yoav, but Mirit went to Yoav and agreed to take out Ofir instead. Ofir won the veto challenge, and chose to cancel Mirit's vote. When Arik and Neta-Li got back to camp, they thought about backstabbing Mirit, but Arik said that now isn't the time, instead either Yoav or Ofir had to go. At Tribal Council, the castaways discussed trust: no one claimed to trust Arik or Ofir. When the votes were revealed, Arik had betrayed Neta-Li and joined Yoav and Itay in voting out Ofir, who became the sixth member of the jury.
69	33	"Episode 33"	May 2, 2009
Neta-Li was upset with Arik for his betrayal, but knew that he was her only chance of making the Final 3. At the reward challenge, Itay won a jet ski, and took Arik with him for a test drive. Back at camp, the hungry castaways scoured for something to eat, but could only find rotten coconuts, which Neta-Li ate out of desperation. At the immunity challenge, the castaways kneeled at the end of a long plank suspended over a pit of water, while holding onto two ropes connected to a weighted hook, carrying a percentage of their weight; as the challenge continued, the percentage increased. Neta-Li won immunity and exiled Arik and Itay.
70	34	"Episode 34"	May 6, 2009
After returning from the immunity challenge, Yoav talked to Neta-Li about getting rid of Mirit for being the largest jury threat; Neta-Li later argued with Mirit, and Mirit responded by scheming with Yoav. For the final Exile Island duel, Arik and Itay both earned a clue to the idol, but were unable to find it. Yoav won the veto challenge, and decided to cancel Itay's vote. Back at camp, Yoav and Neta-Li switched the target to Itay for being a physical threat. Neta-Li told Arik about the plan, and Arik tried to persuade her to voting Yoav instead, because Itay was his best friend in the game. Arik chose not to tell Itay about the plan out of fear for Neta-Li exposing him as a liar. At Tribal Council, Arik sided with Neta-Li and Yoav and betrayed his closest ally, sending Itay to the jury.
71	35	"Episode 35"	May 9, 2009
After Tribal Council, Mirit was mad at Arik for betraying Itay. At the final immunity challenge, the castaways hung onto a rope while lying down on a tilted wooden board while water dripped onto them from a barrel; Yoav won immunity. The castaways were then surprised with a final reward challenge, where Yoav continued his winning streak to earn pitas with hummus and falafel. Yoav was then given a choice: he could trade in the reward for a Subaru Forester, but would have to quit the game to do so.
72	36	"Episode 36"	May 13, 2009
A recap chronicling the jurors' experiences after being voted out of the game.
73	37	"Episode 37"	May 16, 2009
Yoav continued to weigh his choice between winning a new car or staying in the game. Mirit won the final veto challenge. Back at camp, Arik planned to take out Mirit, but Mirit managed to persuade Neta-Li and Yoav to vote Arik. After a ceremony to commemorate the eliminated castaways, the final four had their final Tribal Council on the island. Arik and Mirit got into a huge fight, but Yoav decided to choose the car over the game, and he joined the jury. The host revealed that the Israeli public would then vote one of the finalists out of the game to be the final member of the jury.
74	38	"Finale"	May 23, 2009
Broadcast live from an amphitheatre in Caesarea, Israel, the jurors berated the finalists for their gameplay: Anastasia and Itay yelled at Arik for his betrayals, while Yoav offered Neta-Li his new car if she quit the game; she denied the offer. Those eliminated before the jury returned: Bashevkin revealed that he had sent multiple messages to Nasrin apologizing for his racist comments toward her, and she eventually forgave him; Ofir apologized to Maayan for lying about her; Gal revealed that his leg had fully healed. After a public vote, Neta-Li was eliminated from the game, and she became the final member of the jury. The jurors voted: Arik became the Sole Survivor with Neta-Li, Yoav, Ofir, Igor, Idan and Efrat's votes, while Mirit was the runner-up with Itay, Anastasia and Guy's votes to win.

== Voting history ==
	Original tribes			Post-mutiny				Switched tribes			Merged tribe								
Episode #	2	4	6	8	9	11	12	14	16	18	22	24	26	28	30	32	34	37	38
Day #	3	6	7	12	13	15	18	21	24	27	31	34	37	40	43	46	49	52	Finale (Note: Neta-Li was eliminated during the live finale by a public vote.)
Eliminated	Irit	Nasrin	Gal	Sivan	Meir	Bashevkin	Maayan	Diva	Michal	Mirit	Efrat	Guy	Idan	Anastasia	Igor	Ofir	Itay	Yoav	Neta-Li
Vote	6–4	8–1	Evacuated (Note: Gal was medically evacuated from the game.)	8–1	Disqualified (Note: Meir was disqualified from the game.)	6–1	6–2	5–1	4–1	3–1	6–4	4–0 (Note: Igor played a hidden immunity idol on Idan, therefore the five votes against him did not count.)	3–2–0 (Note: Idan played a hidden immunity idol on Yoav, therefore the three votes against him did not count.)	2–0 (Note: Ofir played a hidden immunity idol, therefore the five votes against him did not count.)	3–2–1	3–2	3–1	Bribed (Note: For winning the final reward challenge, Yoav was given a bribe to leave the game in exchange for a new car; he chose the car.)	Public vote
Voter	Vote																		
Arik	Irit	Nasrin				Bashevkin		Diva	Michal	Mirit	Efrat	~~Idan~~	Idan	Anastasia	Igor	Ofir	Itay		
Mirit				Sivan			Michal	Diva	Michal	Arik	Efrat	~~Idan~~	~~Yoav~~	~~Ofir~~	Yoav	None (Note: This castaway was given the veto bracelet, and was therefore not eligible to vote.)	Yoav		
Neta-Li	Irit	Nasrin				Bashevkin					Efrat	~~Idan~~	~~Yoav~~	~~Ofir~~	Igor	Yoav	Itay		
Yoav				Sivan			Maayan				Guy	Guy	None	~~Ofir~~	None	Ofir	Itay		
Itay	Nasrin	Nasrin				Bashevkin		Diva	Michal	Mirit	Efrat	~~Idan~~	Idan	Anastasia	Yoav	Ofir	None		
Ofir				Sivan			Maayan				None	Guy	Idan	None	Igor	Yoav			
Igor				Sivan			Maayan				Guy	Guy	Arik	~~Ofir~~	Arik				
Anastasia	Irit	Nasrin				Bashevkin					Efrat	~~Idan~~	~~Yoav~~	~~Ofir~~					
Idan				Sivan			Maayan				Guy	Guy	Arik						
Guy	Nasrin	Nasrin				Bashevkin		Diva	Michal	Mirit	Efrat	None							
Efrat	Irit	Nasrin				Bashevkin					Guy								
Michal				Sivan			Maayan	Diva	Mirit										
Diva				Sivan			Maayan	Guy											
Maayan				Sivan			Michal												
Bashevkin	Nasrin	Nasrin				Neta-Li													
Meir																			
Sivan				Igor															
Gal	Irit	Nasrin																	
Nasrin	Irit	Efrat																	
Irit	Nasrin																		

Jury vote
Episode	38	
Finalist	Mirit	Arik
Vote	6–3	
Juror	Vote	
Neta-Li		Arik
Yoav		Arik
Itay	Mirit	
Ofir		Arik
Igor		Arik
Anastasia	Mirit	
Idan		Arik
Guy	Mirit	
Efrat		Arik
