= Survivor (Israeli TV series) =

- Genre: Reality competition
- Created by: Charlie Parsons
- Presented by: Guy Zu-Aretz
- Country of origin: Israel
- Original language: Hebrew
- No. of seasons: 13
- No. of episodes: 416

Original release
- Network: Channel 10
- Release: 15 December 2007 – 2012
- Network: Channel 2
- Release: 2015 – 2017
- Network: Reshet 13
- Release: 2018 – present

Survivor (Hebrew: הישרדות, Hisardut), formerly known as Survivor 10, is an Israeli reality competition game show based on the Survivor television franchise. The series began in December 2007 and aired on Israeli's Channel 10 for 6 seasons. After legal issues between Channel 10 and Castaway Television, the series went on a three-year hiatus before returning in 2015 on Reshet. The show is hosted by actor and singer Guy Zu-Aretz.

Following the basic premise of other international versions of the franchise, it features a group of contestants who are marooned in an isolated location, where they must provide food, water, fire, and shelter for themselves. The contestants compete in challenges for rewards and immunity from elimination. The contestants are progressively eliminated from the game as they are voted out by their fellow contestants, until only one remains and is given the title of "The Last Survivor" and is awarded the grand prize of 1 million NIS.

== Format ==
The show follows the format as the other editions of the show. The players are split between two "tribes", are taken to a remote isolated location and are forced to live off the land with meager supplies for an extended period of time. Frequent physical and mental challenges are used to pit the teams against each other for rewards, such as food or luxuries, or for "immunity", forcing the other tribe to attend "Tribal Council", where they must vote off one of their players.

Once about half the players are remaining, the tribes are merged into a single tribe, and competitions are on an individual basis; winning immunity prevents that player from being voted out. All of the players that are voted out at this stage form the "jury". Once two to four finalists remain, a final Tribal Council is held where the remaining players plead their case to the Jury as to why they should win the game. The jury then votes for which player should be considered the "Last Survivor" and be awarded the grand prize of 1 million NIS.

=== Format changes ===
The series features several modifications to the Survivor format unique to the Israeli production.

==== Challenges ====
Whereas most franchises feature two regular challenges, "Reward" and "Immunity", this series has included two more regular challenges — an additional individual challenge following the immunity challenge, and a duel between two players — the specific natures of which have changed over the series' history.

In the first season, the members of the tribe that lost the immunity challenge competed in the Double-Power challenge, which either granted the winner an extra vote at that night's Tribal Council or individual immunity; after the merge, all contestants competed in the Double-Power challenge, and the winner received either the power to block two contestants from voting at that night's Tribal Council or the ability to cast a second vote at Tribal Council. From the second season onward, the members of the tribe that lost the immunity challenge compete in an individual immunity challenge; after the merge, this is changed to a veto challenge between all remaining contestants, where the winner earns the power to block a tribemate from voting in that night's Tribal Council, in the form of a veto bracelet that they would give to the player whose vote they are blocking. During the last tribal council, it is used to prevent a member of the jury from voting.

There have been three different types of duel challenges used, two of which involve voted out contestants competing for a chance to return to the game. In seasons featuring the Island of the Dead, voted out contestants competed against each other in duels; the duel loser was eliminated from the game for good, while the duel winner remained on the island and awaited their next challenger, with the duel winner returning to the game at predetermined points. This was seen in seasons 1, 4 (pre-merge only), 6 (as Hope Island, with voted out players pre-merge choosing former tribemates to compete for them) and 8. In seasons 7 and 10, voted out players competed against former tribemates to steal their vote at the next Tribal Council and remain in the game. Seasons without duels involving eliminated contestants have instead featured duels between two remaining players competing for a reward or advantage, as seen in seasons 2, 3, 4 (post-merge only), 5 and 9. These duels took place immediately following the immunity challenge, and in seasons 2, 4 and 5, involved the duelists being banished to Exile Island for 24 hours, away from their tribemates.

In seasons without duels involving eliminated contestants, eliminated players have still been given the opportunity to return to the game: in season 2, castaways eliminated before the merge were given the opportunity to wait on a secluded island; those remaining at the merge competed in a single competition, with the winner returning to the game. In season 3, eliminated contestants lived on the Hidden Island, competing in a modified game for up to two weeks. In season 5, the last two contestants eliminated before the merge competed against each other, with the winner returning. In season 9, several contestants returned to the game through various methods shortly after being voted out.

==== Tiebreaker ====
Tribal Council votes ending in a tie are always resolved by a firemaking challenge between the contestants with the most votes, eschewing the runoff ballot seen in international editions. This is true even of the jury's vote for the winner, which is revealed — and, for the first six seasons, cast — during the live finale.

==== Endgame ====
The end of the game has also differed from international seasons, and changed over the course of the series' run.

- In the first season, the final four contestants competed in two immunity challenges to determine the first two of three finalists; those two finalists plus the eight jurors voted between the two remaining contestants to determine the final eliminated contestant. Then the jurors cast their votes for the winner at the live finale, at the conclusion of the season's broadcast, and the results were immediately revealed.
- In seasons two through six, the final contestants were subject to a public vote, where viewers were invited to vote via SMS to determine the final elimination, with the results being revealed months later at the live finale; the eliminated contestant then joined the jury. Like before, the jurors cast their votes for the winner at the live finale.
- From the seventh season onward, this process was changed to resemble international seasons: the final elimination was conducted as a regular vote, and the jury's interrogation of the finalists and casting of the final vote took place during the game; the results were revealed months later during the live finale.

==== Airing format ====
Unlike the American edition, the Israeli edition airs two episodes a week, with the elimination at the end of the second episode, which results in approximately 30–40 episodes per season. The first episode will typically feature the reward and immunity challenges while the second will typically feature the duel, individual immunity or veto challenge and the Tribal Council.

== Seasons ==
List of Survivor (Israel) seasons
No.	Season	Location	Episodes	Days	Castaways	Winner	Runner(s)-up			Final vote	Fan Favourite player	Season premiere	Season finale	Network
1	Survivor: The Caribbean Islands	Los Haitises National Park, Dominican Republic	36	52	20	Naama Kasry	Noam Tor	Dan Mano		5–4–0	Noam Tor	December 15, 2007	May 17, 2008	Channel 10
2	Survivor: Pearl Islands	Pearl Islands, Panama	38	52	20	Arik Alper	Mirit Vaknin			6–3	Mirit Vaknin	December 24, 2008	May 23, 2009	Channel 10
3	Survivor: The Philippines	Caramoan, Camarines Sur, Philippines	35	52	25	Shay Arel	Tom Altagar	Leora Goldberg		6–3–0	Tal Englander	August 29, 2009	December 30, 2009	Channel 10
4	Survivor: Fans vs. Survivors	Caramoan, Camarines Sur, Philippines	24	32	16	Natan Bashevkin	Idan Kapon	Sharon Rafaeli		5–3–2	Dan Mano	June 6, 2010	August 29, 2010	Channel 10
5	Survivor: Camarines	Caramoan, Camarines Sur, Philippines	30	40	20	Irit Rahamim Basis	Gev Pesti	Natalie Cabessa		6–3–0	Yaniv Ruhan	February 14, 2011	June 19, 2011	Channel 10
6	Survivor: VIP (2012)	Ko Jum, Krabi Province, Thailand	31	40	16	Itai Segev	Anat Harel			5–3	Yulia Plotkin	May 2, 2012	August 29, 2012	Channel 10
7	Survivor: Honduras	Bay Islands Department, Honduras	33	46	18	Liron "Tiltil" Orfali	Yityish "Titi" Aynaw	Omri Kohavi	Ruslana Rodina	4–2–1–1	Liron "Tiltil" Orfali	November 1, 2015	March 1, 2016	Channel 2 (Reshet)
8	Survivor: Palawan	Palawan, Philippines	34	46	17	Inbar Pinievsky Basson	Maayan Adam	Masgano Mangisto		5–2–0	Maayan Adam	May 20, 2017	September 16, 2017	Channel 2 (Reshet)
9	Survivor: VIP (2019)	Caramoan, Camarines Sur, Philippines	37	46	18	Đovani Roso	Naama Kasry	Simcha Gueta		7–0–0	Naama Kasry	March 9, 2019	July 13, 2019	Reshet 13
10	Survivor: VIP (2020)	Caramoan, Camarines Sur, Philippines	62	37	18	Asi Buzaglo	Israel Ogalbo	Yarden Gerbi	Idan Rafael Hviv	2-2-1-1; 6–3	Asi Buzaglo	May 2, 2020	September 13, 2020	Reshet 13
11	Survivor: VIP (2021)	Caramoan, Camarines Sur, Philippines	56	40	19	Alla Eibinder	Jacqueline "Jackie" Azoulay	Odelya Swisa		4-4-0; Fire Duel	None	October 16, 2021	April 2, 2022	Reshet 13
12	Survivor: Manila	Manila, Philippines	45	45	18	Elit Musayof	Saar Cohen	Tal Morad	Gal Rubinn	10-1-0-0	Maja Kravarusic	December 17, 2022	April 1, 2023	Reshet 13
13	Survivor: Fire & Water	Palawan, Philippines	47	44	20	Nitzan Yerushalmy	Shai Laniado	Or Shorek		4-2-2	Nitzan Yerushalmy	23 November 2024	April 5, 2025	Reshet 13
14	Survivor: Caramoan	Caramoan, Camarines Sur, Philippines			19							24 October, 2026		Reshet 13

=== Locations ===
Continent/Region	Locations (season number)
Asia (9)	Thailand (6), Philippines (3, 4, 5, 8, 9, 10, 11, 12, 13, 14)
Central America (3)	Hispaniola (1), Panama (2), Honduras (7)

== Contestants ==
Contestant played the game for a second time.

Name	Age	Hometown	Season	Finish
Maya Elharar	29	Tirat Carmel	The Caribbean Islands	20th
Yoav Behr	33	Ramat HaSharon	The Caribbean Islands	19th
Omer Giladi	25	Caesarea	The Caribbean Islands	18th
Elisheva "Tina" Berkovich	57	Ein Hod	The Caribbean Islands	17th
Vika Finkelstein	32	Tel Aviv	The Caribbean Islands	16th
Sivan Shitrit	25	Sderot	The Caribbean Islands	15th
Muli Karacho	25	Alfei Menashe	The Caribbean Islands	14th
Alex Metz	47	Karnei Shomron	The Caribbean Islands	13th
Moshe "Moshik" Lipetz	47	Savyon	The Caribbean Islands	12th
Vera Lichtes	27	Tel Aviv	The Caribbean Islands	11th
Guy Zilberman	29	Ramat Gan	The Caribbean Islands	10th
Lia Gil	32	Ashkelon	The Caribbean Islands	9th
Idan Kapon	30	Haifa	The Caribbean Islands	8th
Shahar Raz	28	Shitim	The Caribbean Islands	7th
Yael Tzafrir	32	Tel Aviv	The Caribbean Islands	6th
Moshe Dan	23	Holon	The Caribbean Islands	5th
Marina Kabisher	24	Tel Aviv	The Caribbean Islands	4th
Dan Mano	29	Haifa	The Caribbean Islands	2nd runner-up
Noam Tor	24	Hofit	The Caribbean Islands	Runner-up
Naama Kasry	29	Carmiel	The Caribbean Islands	The Last Survivor
Irit Virag	35	Tel Aviv	Pearl Islands	20th
Nasrin Ghandour	27	Haifa	Pearl Islands	19th
Gal Erez	43	Arsuf	Pearl Islands	18th
Sivan Rauch-Kahlon	23	Neve Yamin	Pearl Islands	17th
Meir Tzarfati	28	Tel Aviv	Pearl Islands	16th
Natan Bashevkin	28	Nili	Pearl Islands	15th
Maayan Porter	26	Eilat	Pearl Islands	14th
Diva Hatami-Goldwasser	40	Kefar Vitkin	Pearl Islands	13th
Michal Siani	30	Tel Aviv	Pearl Islands	12th
Efrat Yekutiel	27	Manhattan, NY	Pearl Islands	11th
Guy Geyor	28	Tel Aviv	Pearl Islands	10th
Idan Haviv	28	Maccabim-Re'ut	Pearl Islands	9th
Anastasia Mirkin	24	Tirat Carmel	Pearl Islands	8th
Igor Tigner	28	Herzliya	Pearl Islands	7th
Ofir Dallal	33	Tel Aviv	Pearl Islands	6th
Itay Haephrati	23	Tel Mond	Pearl Islands	5th
Yoav Caspi	26	London	Pearl Islands	4th
Neta-Li Zelcerman	27	Tel Aviv	Pearl Islands	3rd
Mirit Vaknin	26	Lod	Pearl Islands	Runner-up
Arik Alper	34	Tel Aviv	Pearl Islands	The Last Survivor
Ori Lapid	32	Tel Aviv	The Philippines	25th
Eitan Bernat	23	Herzliya	The Philippines	24th
Liran Giladi	23	Caesarea	The Philippines	23rd
Noa Waintraub	26	Ra'anana	The Philippines	22nd
Meital Ben David	31	Kiryat Ono	The Philippines	21st
Yael Tzuker	23	Tel Aviv	The Philippines	20th
Merav Fishelson	44	Tel Aviv	The Philippines	19th
Yakov Crispel	40	Haifa	The Philippines	18th
Inna Bakelmann	19	Gan Yavne	The Philippines	17th
Avital Eisman	23	Hadera	The Philippines	16th
Natalie Niv	28	Naharia	The Philippines	15th
Tal Ben David	29	Sdot Yam	The Philippines	14th
Avi Raz	27	Mevaseret Zion	The Philippines	13th
Tal Englander	30	Tel Aviv	The Philippines	12th
Hanoch Budin	46	Nes Ziona	The Philippines	11th
Ziv Gelbart	39	Megadim	The Philippines	10th
Riki Shemesh	33	Gan Sorek	The Philippines	9th
Avigail Perl	25	Tel Aviv	The Philippines	8th
Ohad Taib	23	Rishon LeZion	The Philippines	7th
Liad Farkash	22	Ramat Yishai	The Philippines	6th
Hadas Hornblass	27	Elkana	The Philippines	5th
Tal "Talco" Cohen	29	Haifa	The Philippines	4th
Leora Goldberg	50	Raanana	The Philippines	2nd runner-up
Tom Altagar	23	Ganei Tikva	The Philippines	Runner-up
Shay Arel	31	Kiryat Ata	The Philippines	The Last Survivor
Ariela Kayam	51	Netanya	Fans vs. Survivors	16th
Osher Hadari	25	Herzliya	Fans vs. Survivors	15th
Dar Fishelson	21	Savyon	Fans vs. Survivors	14th
Tal Englander	31	Tel Aviv	Fans vs. Survivors	13th
Marina Kabisher	26	Tel Aviv	Fans vs. Survivors	12th
Guy Gold	27	Jerusalem	Fans vs. Survivors	11th
Itay Strauss	29	Tel Aviv	Fans vs. Survivors	10th
Maayan Porter	28	Eilat	Fans vs. Survivors	9th
Dan Mano	32	London	Fans vs. Survivors	8th
Mirit Vaknin	28	Lod	Fans vs. Survivors	7th
Lidar Shanny	30	Eilat	Fans vs. Survivors	6th
Avigail Perl	26	Tel Aviv	Fans vs. Survivors	5th
Max "Shpex" Levkovski	41	Ramat Aviv	Fans vs. Survivors	4th
Sharon Rafaeli	27	Ra'anana	Fans vs. Survivors	2nd runner-up
Idan Kapon	32	Haifa	Fans vs. Survivors	Runner-up
Natan Bashevkin	30	Nili	Fans vs. Survivors	The Last Survivor
Natalie Ben Ari	22	Ramat HaSharon	Camarines	20th
Morel Ben-Hamo	21	Kiryat Ata	Camarines	19th
Pninit Rozenberg	25	Haifa	Camarines	18th
Ofri Yariv	22	Hatzor	Camarines	17th
Aviv Basis	33	Bat Hen	Camarines	16th
Yigal Ben Binyamin	39	Rehovot	Camarines	15th
Ben Malka	28	Tveria	Camarines	14th
Yula Kravits	23	Rishon LeZion	Camarines	13th
Liron Strauss	28	Kfar Shmaryahu	Camarines	12th
Yonatan Chemla	26	Ein Kerem	Camarines	11th
Roei Lulu	35	Haifa	Camarines	10th
Yana Kalman	36	Tel Aviv	Camarines	9th
Ohad Alon	28	Menahemia	Camarines	8th
Giora Rothman	53	Herzelia	Camarines	7th
Shunit Faragi	23	Kiryat Tiv'on	Camarines	6th
Etti Halewa	28	Kiryat Shmona	Camarines	5th
Yaniv Ruhan	29	Petah Tikva	Camarines	4th
Natalie Cabessa	29	Bet Yanai	Camarines	2nd runner-up
Gev Pesti	27	Tel Aviv	Camarines	Runner-up
Irit Rahamim Basis	36	Tel Aviv	Camarines	The Last Survivor
Michael Lewis	24	Tel Aviv	VIP (2012)	16th
Doron Jamchi	50	Tel Aviv	VIP (2012)	15th
Iris Bar-On	56	Kfar Saba	VIP (2012)	14th
Inbal Gavrieli	36	Kfar Sirkin	VIP (2012)	13th
Michal Zoharetz	43	Tel Aviv	VIP (2012)	12th
Harel Moyal	30	Gedera	VIP (2012)	11th
Azzam Azzam	48	Maghar	VIP (2012)	10th
Oshri Cohen	28	Tel Aviv	VIP (2012)	9th
Yulia Plotkin	23	Tel Aviv	VIP (2012)	8th
Nataly Dadon	28	Kiryat Bialik	VIP (2012)	7th
Moshe Ferster	48	Giv'atayim	VIP (2012)	6th
Itay Turgeman	28	Tel Aviv	VIP (2012)	5th
Buki Nae	54	Ramat Gan	VIP (2012)	4th
Anna Aronov	29	Tel Aviv	VIP (2012)	3rd
Anat Harel	41	Tel Aviv	VIP (2012)	Runner-up
Itai Segev	39	Rehovot	VIP (2012)	The Last Survivor
Jeanette Zohar Sabag	55	Jaffa	Honduras	18th
Meital Dohan	36	Los Angeles, CA	Honduras	17th
Ben-Yahav Navat	36	Petah Tikva	Honduras	16th
Lisa Shurkin	36	Tel Aviv	Honduras	15th
Yehuda Shushan	42	Neve Ilan	Honduras	14th
Shimon Amsalem	49	Tel Aviv	Honduras	13th
Ron Aluf	23	Rishon LeZion	Honduras	12th
Omer Rozen	27	Tel Aviv	Honduras	11th
Ron Shoval	42	Ramat Gan	Honduras	10th
Moshik Galamin	36	Tel Aviv	Honduras	9th
Huda Naccache	26	Haifa	Honduras	8th
Jenny Chervoney	33	Tel Aviv	Honduras	7th
Liron Revivo	21	Beit Uziel	Honduras	6th
Dana Berger	44	Jerusalem	Honduras	5th
Ruslana Rodina	27	Rehovot	Honduras	2nd runner-up
Omri Kohavi	28	Tel Aviv	Honduras	2nd runner-up
Yityish "Titi" Aynaw	24	Tel Aviv	Honduras	Runner-up
Liron "Tiltil" Orfali	40	Ramat Gan	Honduras	The Last Survivor
Raz Nisim Cohen	26	Tel Aviv	Palawan	17th
Adi Berger	25	Jerusalem	Palawan	16th
Daniel Avisris	24	Kiryat Haim	Palawan	15th
Nicola Ward	20	Amir	Palawan	14th
Alon Sasson	30	Jerusalem	Palawan	13th
Tanita Faber	39	Ashkelon	Palawan	12th
Bar Zomer	23	Haifa	Palawan	11th
Amir Fachar	27	Jaffa	Palawan	10th
Sagi Braitner	23	Caesarea	Palawan	9th
Yossi Bublil	36	Netanya	Palawan	8th
Vered Spivak	46	Tel Aviv	Palawan	7th
Raz Zehavi	45	Hadera	Palawan	6th
Michal Fucs	35	Ness Ziona	Palawan	5th
Netanel "Nati" Sade	40	Nehora	Palawan	4th
Masgano Mangisto	31	Ma'ale Adumim	Palawan	2nd runner-up
Maayan Adam	29	Petah Tikva	Palawan	Runner-up
Inbar Pinievsky Basson	29	Givatayim	Palawan	The Last Survivor
Rotem Rabi	23	Jerusalem	VIP (2019)	18th
Moshe Primo	58	Netanya	VIP (2019)	17th
Dror Refael	44	Kadima-Tzoran	VIP (2019)	16th
Einat Erlich	50	Netanya	VIP (2019)	15th
Orin Julie	24	Kiryat Ono	VIP (2019)	14th
Alexandra "Alexa" Dol	25	Tel Aviv	VIP (2019)	13th
Mishel Taroni	34	Ramat Gan	VIP (2019)	12th
Jonathan "Joezi" Zirah	30	Tel Aviv	VIP (2019)	11th
Eyal Berkover	28	Lima	VIP (2019)	10th
Assaf Ashtar	54	Hadera	VIP (2019)	9th
Luna Mansour	26	Acre	VIP (2019)	8th
Lihi Griner	34	Petah Tikva	VIP (2019)	7th
Ira Dolfin	37	Tel Aviv	VIP (2019)	6th
Shaked Komemy	27	Rosh HaAyin	VIP (2019)	5th
Menahem "Meni" Naftali	40	Afula	VIP (2019)	4th
Simcha Gueta	30	Bat Yam	VIP (2019)	Co-runner-up
Naama Kasry	40	Herzliya	VIP (2019)	Co-runner-up
Đovani Roso	46	Kiryat Ata	VIP (2019)	The Last Survivor
Dana Ron	48	Tel Aviv	VIP (2020)	18th
Nava Boker	49	Hedera	VIP (2020)	17th
Nikol Reznikov	20	Afula	VIP (2020)	16th
Zohar Strauss	48	Ramat Gan	VIP (2020)	15th
Adi Bity	18	Hod HaSharon	VIP (2020)	14th
Semion Grafman	45	Bat Yam	VIP (2020)	13th
David Dvir	70	Ramat Gan	VIP (2020)	12th
Lital Smadja	32	Petah Tikva	VIP (2020)	11th
Ilana Avital	60	Ramat HaSharon	VIP (2020)	10th
Ido Kozikaro	42	Haifa	VIP (2020)	9th
Regev Hod	39	Rehovot	VIP (2020)	8th
Ella Ayalon	22	Tel Aviv	VIP (2020)	7th
Benny Bruchim	47	Kefar Saba	VIP (2020)	6th
Alina Levy	29	Ra'anana	VIP (2020)	5th
Yarden Gerbi	30	Netanya	VIP (2020)	2nd runner-up
Idan Haviv	40	Tel Aviv	VIP (2020)	2nd runner-up
Israel Ogalbo	29	Tel Aviv	VIP (2020)	Runner-up
Asi Buzaglo	32	Petah Tikva	VIP (2020)	The Last Survivor
Henry David	42	Matat	VIP (2021)	19th
Ohad Buzaglo	39	Bat Yam	VIP (2021)	18th
Maayan Ashkenazi	30	Herzliya	VIP (2021)	17th
Fanny Bar Mucha	34	Acre	VIP (2021)	16th
Liza Bikh	25	Be'er Sheva	VIP (2021)	15th
Michael Lewis	33	Herzliya	VIP (2021)	14th
Vered Buskila	37	Tel Aviv	VIP (2021)	13th
Kobi Maor	43	Petah Tikva	VIP (2021)	12th
Yuval Shem-Tov	48	Neve Yarak	VIP (2021)	11th
Gadi Panivilov	23	Kiryat Haim	VIP (2021)	10th
Liya Gil	45	Kadima-Tzoran	VIP (2021)	9th
Yehonatan Bashan	31	Herzliya	VIP (2021)	8th
Dudu Aouate	43	Nof HaGalil	VIP (2021)	7th
Dandan Bolotin	62	Bolotin farm	VIP (2021)	6th
Zohar Strauss	48	Ramat Gan	VIP (2021)	5th
Shira Parver	52	Tel Aviv	VIP (2021)	4th
Odelya Swisa	34	Yeroham	VIP (2021)	2nd runner-up
Jackie Azulai	37	Rosh HaAyin	VIP (2021)	Runner-up
Alla Aibinder	33	Ramat Gan	VIP (2021)	The Last Survivor
Maor Shushan	32	Netanya	Manila	18th
Nevo Shamir	31	Tel-Aviv	Manila	17th
Nir Regev	42	Lod	Manila	16th
Daniel Zioni	28	Haifa	Manila	15th
Tanya Lauren	21	Rishon LeZion	Manila	14th
Sapir Kashty	30	Holon	Manila	13th
Yarden Zohar	27	Tel-Aviv	Manila	12th
Guy Rozen	32	Tel-Aviv	Manila	11th
Doreen Dotan-Farkash	28	Tel-Aviv	Manila	10th
Guy Shiker	48	Ramat HaSharon	Manila	9th
Natasha Halil	40	Ramat Aviv	Manila	8th
Maya Keyy	19	Yavne	Manila	7th
Kasey Zapata	24	Tel-Aviv	Manila	6th
Aviran Shmuel	33	Netanya	Manila	5th
Tal Morad	21	Moshavat Kinneret	Manila	2nd runner-up
Gal Rubinn	32	Ma'ale Adumim	Manila	2nd runner-up
Sahar Cohen	26	Nahariya	Manila	Runner-up
Elit Musayof	52	Holon	Manila	The Last Survivor
Sivan Shaul Gabay	42	Rishon Lezion	Fire & Water	20th
Netali Shaul	40	Yinon	Fire & Water	19th
Ben Kadosh	40	Migdal HaEmek	Fire & Water	18th
Micha Kadosh	40	Rehovot	Fire & Water	17th
Ilana Gilboa	37	Kfar Sava	Fire & Water	16th
Chen Ohana	37	Tveria	Fire & Water	15th
Michal Avrahami	53	Herzliya	Fire & Water	14th
Tania Haves Bar-On	56	Kfar Vradim	Fire & Water	13th
Omri Gilboa	37	Kfar Sava	Fire & Water	12th
Merav Avrahami	28	Herzliya	Fire & Water	11th
Shaked Yerushalmy	27	Tel-Aviv	Fire & Water	10th
Ron Shorek	25	Tel-Aviv	Fire & Water	9th
Yana Barski	37	Tveria	Fire & Water	8th
Zion Makenzi	47	Kfar Sava	Fire & Water	7th
Itamar Bar-On	25	Kfar Vradim	Fire & Water	6th
Shalev Vardi	22	Modi'in	Fire & Water	5th
Dudik Laniado	65	Kalya	Fire & Water	4th
Shai Laniado	32	Kalya	Fire & Water	Co-runner-up
Or Shorek	25	Matan	Fire & Water	Co-runner-up
Nitzan Yerushalmy	29	Tel-Aviv	Fire & Water	The Last Survivor
