= Survivor: Camarines (Israeli season) =

- Season 5
- Presented by: Guy Zu-Aretz
- No. of days: 40
- No. of castaways: 20
- Winner: Irit Rahamim Basis
- Runner-up: Gev Pesti
- Location: Caramoan Peninsula, Philippines
- No. of episodes: 30

Release
- Original network: Channel 10
- Original release: February 14 – June 19, 2011

Additional information
- Filming dates: April 2010 – May 2010

Season chronology
- ← Previous; Fans vs. Favorites Next → VIP

Survivor: Camarines (Hebrew: הישרדות איי קמרינס, Hisardut Ai Camarines) was the fifth season of the Israeli reality program Survivor. The show featured 20 contestants competing for 40 days, and was the third season in a row to be filmed in the Caramoan Peninsula in the Camarines Sur province of the Philippines. The season aired from February 14, 2011 until the live finale on June 19, 2011, when Irit Rahamim Basis was named Sole Survivor over Gev Pesti and Natalie Cabessa by a vote of 6–3–0, and Yaniv Ruhan was awarded the fan favorite award by public vote.

The original concept for the season was to split the players by ethnicity (Ashkenazi vs. people of Sephardic/Mizrahi descent), but was dismissed when rumors drew public criticism. Instead, the season featured a "Haves vs. Have Nots" premise wherein one tribe's camp was furnished with several luxuries, similar to "Survivor: Fiji," the 14th season of the United States' version. The Banao tribe won the furnished camp by winning the opening reward challenge, but both tribes automatically switched camps on Day 6. This twist ended when the tribes were shuffled on Day 12, as both new tribes went to new camps.

== Contestants ==
Contestant	Original tribe	Switched tribe	Merged tribe	Finish
Natalie Ben Ari; 22, Ramat HaSharon	Marikudo			1st voted out Day 2
Morel Ben Hamo; 21, Kiryat Ata	Banao			2nd voted out Day 5
Pninit Rozenberg; 25, Haifa	Marikudo			3rd voted out Day 8
Ofri Yariv; 22, Hatzor	Banao			Medically evacuated Day 10
Aviv Basis; 33, Bat Hen	Banao			4th voted out Day 11
Yigal Ben Binyamin; 39, Rehovot	Marikudo			Eliminated (Note: Yigal was automatically eliminated after not being chosen for a tribe during the tribe switch.); Day 12
Ben Malka; 28, Tiberias	Banao	Marikudo		5th voted out Day 14
Yula Kravits; 23, Rishon LeZion	Banao	Marikudo		6th voted out Day 16
Yaniv Ruhan; Returned to game	Marikudo	Banao		7th voted out Day 17
Liron Strauss; 28, Kfar Shmaryahu	Marikudo	Marikudo	Malaya	8th voted out 1st jury member Day 21
Yonatan Chemla; 26, Ein Karem	Banao	Banao	Malaya	9th voted out 2nd jury member Day 24
Roei Lulu; 35, Haifa	Banao	Banao	Malaya	10th voted out 3rd jury member Day 24
Yana Kalman; 36, Tel Aviv	Banao	Banao	Malaya	11th voted out 4th jury member Day 27
Ohad Alon; 28, Menahemia	Marikudo	Marikudo	Malaya	12th voted out 5th jury member Day 30
Giora Rothman; 53, Herzliya	Banao	Marikudo	Malaya	13th voted out 6th jury member Day 33
Shunit Faragi; 23, Kiryat Tiv'on	Marikudo	Marikudo	Malaya	14th voted out 7th jury member Day 36
Etti Halewa; 28, Kiryat Shmona	Banao	Banao	Malaya	15th voted out 8th jury member Day 39
Yaniv Ruhan; 29, Petah Tikva	Marikudo	Banao	Malaya	Eliminated (Note: Yaniv was eliminated during the live finale by a public vote.); 9th jury member Finale
Natalie Cabessa; 29, Beit Yanai	Marikudo	Banao	Malaya	2nd runner-up
Gev Pesti; 27, Tel Aviv	Marikudo	Banao	Malaya	Runner-up
Irit Rahamim Basis; 36, Tel Aviv	Marikudo	Marikudo	Malaya	Sole Survivor

== Season summary ==
Pre-merge challenge winners and eliminations by cycle
Episode(s)	Original air date	Challenge winner(s)			Exile Island duel		Voted out	Finish
Episode(s)	Original air date	Reward	Tribal immunity	Individual immunity	Winner	Loser	Voted out	Finish
1	February 14, 2011	Banao	Banao	Liron	None		Natalie B.	1st voted out Day 2
2 & 3	February 20 & 21, 2011	Banao	Marikudo	Roei	Gev	Yonatan	Morel	2nd voted out Day 5
4 & 5	February 27 & 28, 2011	Marikudo	Banao	Irit	Ohad	Aviv	Pninit	3rd voted out Day 8
6 & 7	March 6 & 7, 2011	Marikudo	Marikudo	~~Aviv~~ (Yana) (Note: At Tribal Council, Aviv chose to give his immunity to Yana.)	Etti	Natalie C.	Ofri	Evacuated; Day 10
6 & 7	March 6 & 7, 2011	Marikudo	Marikudo	~~Aviv~~ (Yana)	Etti	Natalie C.	Aviv	4th voted out Day 11
8 & 9	March 13 & 14, 2011	Marikudo	Banao	Giora	Ben	Yaniv	Yigal	Eliminated (Note: Yigal was automatically eliminated after not being chosen for a tribe during the tribe switch.); Day 12
8 & 9	March 13 & 14, 2011	Marikudo	Banao	Giora	Ben	Yaniv	Ben	5th voted out Day 14
10 & 11	March 20 & 21, 2011	Banao	None (Note: Due to both tribes being sent to Tribal Council, there was no tribal immunity challenge and no one was sent to Exile Island.)	Giora	None		Yula	6th voted out Day 16
10 & 11	March 20 & 21, 2011	Banao	None	Yonatan	None		Yaniv	7th voted out Day 17

Post-merge challenge winners and eliminations by cycle
Episode(s)	Original air date	Challenge winner(s)			Exile Island duel		Voted out	Finish
Episode(s)	Original air date	Reward	Immunity	Veto	Winner	Loser	Voted out	Finish
12, 13 & 14	March 27, 28 & April 3, 2011	Roei [Yonatan]	Yaniv (Note: Yaniv and Yula, the two castaways eliminated during the double Tribal Council, competed against each other to return to the game; Yaniv won, earning immunity at the next Tribal Council as a result.)	Yonatan	Yana	Irit	Liron	8th voted out 1st jury member Day 21
12, 13 & 14	March 27, 28 & April 3, 2011	Roei [Yonatan]	Yonatan	Yonatan	Yana	Irit	Liron	8th voted out 1st jury member Day 21
16 & 17 (Note: Episode 15, which aired on April 4, 2011, was a recap episode.)	April 10 & 11, 2011	Food roulette (Note: Castaways chose the name of another castaway along with a prize and local delicacy, all at random. If the castaway ate the local delicacy, the castaway whose name they picked won the prize.)	Yaniv	Yaniv	Yonatan	Roei	Yonatan	9th voted out 2nd jury member Day 24
16 & 17	April 10 & 11, 2011	Food roulette	Yaniv	Yaniv	Yonatan	Roei	Roei	10th voted out 3rd jury member Day 24
18 & 19	April 25 & May 2, 2011	Gev, Natalie C., Yaniv	Gev	Ohad	Natalie C.	Yaniv	Yana	11th voted out 4th jury member Day 27
20 & 21	May 15 & 16, 2011	Survivor; Auction	Gev	Natalie C.	Shunit	Gev	Ohad	12th voted ot 5th jury member Day 30
22 & 23	May 22 & 23, 2011	Gev	Yaniv	Giora	Yaniv	Irit	Giora	13th voted out 6th jury member Day 33
24 & 25	May 29 & 30, 2011	Shunit (Note: Shunit chose to share her reward with the rest of the tribe.)	Etti	Etti	Etti	Yaniv	Shunit	14th voted out 7th jury member Day 36
26 & 28 (Note: Episode 27 was a recap episode.)	June 5 & 12, 2011	None	Irit	Gev	None		Etti	15th voted out 8th jury member Day 39
28 & 30 (Note: Episode 29 was a recap episode.)	June 12 & 19, 2011	None	Natalie C. (Note: Natalie C. earned immunity from the public vote to determine the final elimination.)	None			Yaniv	Eliminated (Note: Yaniv was eliminated during the live finale by a public vote.); 9th jury member Finale
28 & 30	June 12 & 19, 2011						Jury vote	
28 & 30	June 12 & 19, 2011						Natalie C.	2nd runner-up
28 & 30	June 12 & 19, 2011						Gev	Runner-up
28 & 30	June 12 & 19, 2011						Irit	Sole Survivor

- Survivor Auction: There was no Reward Challenge. Instead, a Survivor Auction was held. Here is what was purchased:

Contestants	Item(s)
Etti	Hamburger and French Fries (₱1000)
Gev	Bowl of Pasta (₱1000)
Irit	Sabich
Natalie C.	Music device, water oboe.
Shunit	Baby Doll
Yaniv	Coffee and Croissant
Giora	Set of lotions and facial equipment
Ohad	A Massage and Popcorn

== Voting history ==
	Original tribes						Switched tribes			Merged tribe								
Episode #	1	3	5	6	7	8	9	10	11	14	17		19	21	23	25	28	30
Day #	2	5	8	10	11	12	14	16	17	21	24		27	30	33	36	39	Finale
Eliminated	Natalie B.	Morel	Pninit	Ofri	Aviv	Yigal	Ben	Yula	Yaniv	Liron	Yonatan	Roei	Yana	Ohad	Giora	Shunit	Etti	Yaniv
Votes	6–3–1	6–4	5–4	Evacuated (Note: No vote; Ofri was medically evacuated from the game.)	5–3	Eliminated (Note: Yigal was automatically eliminated after not being chosen for a tribe during the tribe switch.)	5–2	4–2	4–2–1	8–3	6–3–1	6–2–1	3–1–0 (Note: Yana used a hidden immunity idol on Etti, therefore the four votes cast against Etti were not counted.)	5–2	4–1–1	2–0 (Note: Gev used a hidden immunity idol, therefore the three votes cast against him were not counted.)	4–0	Public vote
Voter	Vote																	
Irit	Natalie B.		Pninit				Ben	Yula		None (Note: This castaway was given the veto bracelet, and was therefore not eligible to vote.)	Yonatan	Roei	~~Etti~~	Etti	Etti	~~Gev~~	Etti	
Gev	Yigal		Yigal						Natalie C.	Liron	Yonatan	Roei	~~Etti~~	Ohad	Giora	None	Etti	
Natalie C.	Yigal		Yigal						Gev	Liron	Yonatan	Roei	Yana	Ohad	Giora	Shunit	Etti	Immune
Yaniv	Natalie B.		Pninit						Natalie C.	Liron	Yonatan	Roei	~~Etti~~	Ohad	Giora	Shunit	Etti	
Etti		Morel			Ben				Yaniv	Liron	Giora	Giora	Giora	Ohad	Giora	~~Gev~~	None	
Shunit	Natalie B.		Yigal				Ben	Yula		Giora	Yonatan	Roei	Yana	Etti	None	~~Gev~~		
Giora		Morel			Aviv		Yula	Ohad		Liron	None (Note: Giora was given the veto bracelet for the double Tribal Council, and was therefore not eligible to vote for either ballot.)		~~Etti~~	Ohad	Shunit			
Ohad	Natalie B.		Pninit				Ben	Yula		Giora	Yonatan	Roei	Yana	None				
Yana		Morel			Ben				Yaniv	Liron	Giora	Giora	None					
Roei		Aviv			Aviv				Yaniv	Liron	Giora	Irit						
Yonatan		Morel			Aviv				Yaniv	Liron	Irit							
Liron	Natalie B.		Pninit				Ben	Yula		Giora								
Yula		Morel			Aviv		Ben	Ohad										
Ben		Aviv			Aviv		Yula											
Yigal	Natalie B.		Pninit															
Aviv		Morel			Ben													
Ofri		Aviv																
Pninit	Yigal		Yigal															
Morel		Aviv																
Natalie B.	Natalie C.																	

Jury vote
Episode #	30		
Day #	40		
Finalist:	Natalie C.	Gev	Irit
Votes:	6–3–0		
Juror	Vote		
Yaniv		Gev	
Etti			Irit
Shunit			irit
Giora			irit
Ohad			irit
Yana		Gev	
Roei			irit
Yonatan		Gev	
Liron			irit
