= Raz Zehavi =

Israeli footballer

Raz Zehavi רז זהבי
Personal information
- Full name: Raz Zehavi
- Date of birth: December 1, 1971 (age 54)
- Place of birth: Israel
- Position: Goalkeeper

Youth career
- Hapoel Hadera

Senior career*
Years	Team	Apps	(Gls)
1990–1996	Hapoel Hadera		
1996–1997	Hapoel Bnei Nujeidat		
1997–1999	F.C. Bu'eine		

International career
- Israel U-19
- * Club domestic league appearances and goals

Raz Zehavi (Hebrew: רז זהבי; born December 1, 1971) is an Israeli former footballer who spent most of his career as the goalkeeper of Hapoel Hadera in the second tier of Israeli football. He now works as a regular commentator on the Israeli Sport 5 TV channel.
