= Survivor: The Caribbean Islands (Israeli season) =

- Season 1
- Survivor: The Caribbean Logo
- Presented by: Guy Zu-Aretz
- No. of days: 52
- No. of castaways: 20
- Winner: Naama Kasry
- Runner-up: Noam Tor
- Location: Los Haitises National Park, Dominican Republic
- No. of episodes: 36

Release
- Original network: Channel 10
- Original release: December 15, 2007 – May 17, 2008

Additional information
- Filming dates: June – July, 2007

Season chronology
- Next → Survivor: Pearl Islands

Survivor: The Caribbean Islands (Hebrew: הישרדות האיים הקריביים, romanized: Hisardut HaAiim HaKaribiim) is the first season of the Israeli edition of Survivor. Based on the popular reality game show Survivor, the series was shot between June and July, 2007, in Los Haitises National Park, Dominican Republic. It was produced by Reyif HeMeiri production company, with an approximated budget of $5,000,000. It is broadcast on the Channel 10.

The Sole Survivor was Naama Kasry, who defeated Noam Tor and Dan Mano in the final Tribal Council by a 5-4-0 vote. Naama received the grand prize of 1,000,000 ₪ prize: 645,000 ₪ in cash and an off-road car. Tor was named the audience's favorite player after winning a public vote.

== Format changes ==
Although the main format is the same, this season introduced several notable differences from the American version of Survivor:

- Filming length: This season was filmed over 52 days, compared to the 39-day length of most American seasons.
- Airing format: This season aired twice a week, compared to the once-weekly airing schedule of the American version. The American version largely produces one episode for every three days, culminating in an elimination; this season had 36 episodes, with two episodes for every three days. The first episode of the week featured the Reward and Immunity Challenges, while the second featured the Double-Power Challenge, Island of the Dead battle and Tribal Council. On two occasions, the Tribal council wasn't aired during the week's second episode, but instead at the start of the next week's first episode.
- Double-Power Challenge: A new type of individual challenge typically played the day after the Immunity Challenge. Before the merge, the challenge was competed by the members of the tribe that lost the previous day's immunity challenge, and the winner earned either a second vote at that night's Tribal Council (episodes 1–9) or individual immunity (episodes 10–15). After the merge, all contestants competed in the Double-Power challenge, and the winner received either the power to block two contestants from voting at that night's Tribal Council (episodes 16–19) or the ability to cast a second vote at Tribal Council (episode 20 onward).
- Island of the Dead: A secluded area where voted out contestants competed against each other in duels to remain in the game. When only three contestants remained in the main game, the winner of the final Island of the Dead duel returned to the game. This twist has been used in other international versions of Survivor, and later appeared in the American version as Redemption Island.
- Endgame: The final four castaways competed in two immunity challenges to determine two of the three finalists. The jury and the two immune finalists then voted between the two remaining castaways to determine the third finalist. The votes were cast during the final day of filming in the Dominican Republic, and the votes were read shortly thereafter in a fortification next to Herzliya. The newly completed jury then interrogated the finalists but, unlike the American version, did not cast their ballots at the conclusion of the final Tribal Council. Instead, votes were cast months later during the live reunion at the Nokia Arena in Tel Aviv, and read immediately afterward.

== Contestants ==
Contestant	Original tribe	Merged tribe	Main game (Note: Elimination order is based on when the contestant was voted out at Tribal Council.)	Island of the Dead
Maya Elharar; 29, Tirat Carmel	Sabana		1st voted out Day 3	Lost duel 1 Day 7
Yoav Behr; 33, Ramat HaSharon	Sabana		2nd voted out Day 6	Lost duel 2 Day 10
Omer Giladi; 25, Caesarea	Jibaro		3rd voted out Day 9	Lost duel 4 Day 16
Elisheva "Tina" Berkovich; 57, Ein Hod	Sabana		4th voted out Day 12	Lost duel 3 Day 13
Vika Finkelstein; 25, Sderot	Jibaro		5th voted out Day 15	Lost duel 6 Day 22
Sivan Shitrit; 25, Tel Aviv	Jibaro		6th voted out Day 18	Lost duel 5 Day 19
Noam Tor; Returned to game	Jibaro		7th voted out Day 21	Returnee; Day 49
Muli Karacho; 25, Alfei Menashe	Sabana		8th voted out Day 21	Lost duel 6 Day 22
Alex Metz; 47, Karnei Shomron	Jibaro		9th voted out Day 24	Lost duel 7 Day 25
Moshe "Moshik" Lipetz; 47, Savyon	Sabana	Taino	10th voted out Day 28	Lost duel 8; 1st jury member Day 29
Vera Lichtes; 27, Tel Aviv	Sabana	Taino	11th voted out Day 31	Lost duel 9; 2nd jury member Day 32
Guy Zilberman; 29, Ramat Gan	Sabana	Taino	12th voted out Day 34	Lost duel 10; 3rd jury member Day 35
Liya Gil; 32, Ashkelon	Sabana	Taino	13th voted out Day 37	Lost duel 11; 4th jury member Day 38
Idan Kapon; 30, Haifa	Sabana	Taino	14th voted out Day 40	Lost duel 12; 5th jury member Day 41
Shahar Raz; 28, Shittim	Sabana	Taino	15th voted out Day 43	Lost duel 13; 6th jury member Day 44
Yael Tzafrir; 32, Tel Aviv	Jibaro	Taino	16th voted out Day 45	Lost duel 14; 7th jury member Day 46
Moshe Dan; 23, Holon	Jibaro	Taino	17th voted out Day 47	Lost duel 15; 8th jury member Day 49
Marina Kabisher; 24, Tel Aviv	Jibaro	Taino	18th voted out 9th jury member Day 52	
Dan Mano; 29, Haifa	Jibaro	Taino	2nd runner-up	
Noam Tor; 24, Hofit	Jibaro	Taino	Runner-up	
Naama Kasry; 29, Karmiel	Jibaro	Taino	Sole Survivor	

=== Future appearances ===
Dan Mano, Idan Kapon and Marina Kabisher returned for Survivor: Fans vs. Survivors. Naama Kasry returned for the 2019 season of Survivor: VIP. Liya Gil returned for the 2021 season of Survivor: VIP.

== Season summary ==
Challenge winners and eliminations by cycle
Episodes		Island of the Dead		Challenges			Eliminated	Finish
No.	Original air date	Winner	Eliminated	Reward	Immunity	Double Power	Eliminated	Finish
1	December 15, 2007	None		Jibaro		Idan	Maya	1st voted out Day 3
2 & 3	December 22 & 23, 2007	None		Sabana	Jibaro	Tina	Yoav	2nd voted out Day 6
4 & 5	December 26 & 29, 2007	Yoav	Maya	Sabana	Sabana	Dan	Omer	3rd voted out Day 9
6 & 7	January 2 & 5, 2008	Omer	Yoav	Jibaro	Jibaro	Moshik	Tina	4th voted out Day 12
8 & 9	January 9 & 12, 2008	Omer	Tina	Sabana	Sabana	Dan	Vika	5th voted out Day 15
10 & 11	January 16 & 19, 2008	Vika	Omer	Jibaro	Sabana	Yael	Sivan	6th voted out Day 18
12, 13 & 14	January 23, 26 & 30, 2008	Vika	Sivan	Liya, Marina, Naama, Shahar, Vera, Yael (Note: The castaways were divided into teams by gender, but retained their original tribal affiliations.)	Dan, (Note: As there were eight men to six women, Dan, as the man with the most individual challenge wins, was moved to the women's team.); Liya, Marina, Naama, Shahar, Vera, Yael	Moshik	Noam	7th voted out Day 21
12, 13 & 14	January 23, 26 & 30, 2008	Vika	Sivan	Liya, Marina, Naama, Shahar, Vera, Yael	Dan, Liya, Marina, Naama, Shahar, Vera, Yael	Moshik	Muli	8th voted out Day 21
14 & 15	January 30 & February 2, 2008	Noam	Vika	Sabana	Sabana	Yael	Alex	9th voted out Day 24
14 & 15	January 30 & February 2, 2008	Noam	Muli	Sabana	Sabana	Yael	Alex	9th voted out Day 24
16 & 17	February 6 & 9, 2008	Noam	Alex	None	Dan	Marina	Moshik	10th voted out Day 28
18 & 19	February 13 & 16, 2008	Noam	Moshik	Dan, Guy [Liya]	Guy	Dan	Vera	11th voted out Day 31
20 & 21	February 20 & 23, 2008	Noam	Vera	Idan, Liya	Yael	Dan	Guy	12th voted out Day 34
22, 23 & 24	February 27, March 1 & 4, 2008	Noam	Guy	Naama	Marina	Dan [Marina] (Note: The first round of the challenge was competed in pairs, while the second was between the members of the winning pair; Dan won the second round, but Marina also received an additional reward.)	Liya	13th voted out Day 37
24 & 25	March 4 & 8, 2008	Noam	Liya	Survivor; Auction	Dan	Shahar	Idan	14th voted out Day 40
26 & 27	March 11 & 15, 2008	Noam	Idan	Dan	Marina	Dan	Shahar	15th voted out Day 43
28 & 29	March 18 & 22, 2008	Noam	Shahar	Dan	Marina	Dan	Yael	16th voted out Day 45
30 & 31	March 29 & April 5, 2008	Noam	Yael	Dan [Naama]	Dan	Dan	Moshe	17th voted out Day 47
32, 33, 34, 35 & 36	April 12 & 27, May 3, 10 & 17, 2008	Noam (Note: Returned to game upon winning final Island of the Dead duel.)	Moshe	None	Dan	None	Marina	18th voted out 9th jury member Day 52
32, 33, 34, 35 & 36	April 12 & 27, May 3, 10 & 17, 2008	Noam	Moshe	None	~~Noam~~ [Naama] (Note: At Tribal Council, Noam gave immunity to Naama.)	None	Marina	18th voted out 9th jury member Day 52
36	May 17, 2008						Jury vote	
36	May 17, 2008						Dan	2nd runner-up
36	May 17, 2008						Noam	Runner-up
36	May 17, 2008						Naama	Sole Survivor

== Survivor Auction ==
Contestants	Item(s)
Dan	Hamburger and French fries
Idan	A bowl of sand (Mystery item)
Marina	Chinese mind game, a big plate of food (Hamburger and Fries, Falafel, Lemonade and an Apple) (Mystery item)
Moshe	Nothing
Naama	Falafel and Tachina, Cold Lemonade, MP3 Player
Shahar	Nothing
Yael	Apple

== Voting history ==
	Original tribes														Merged tribe														
Episode	1		3		5		7		9		11	14		15	17	19	21		24		25		27		29		31		36
Day	3		6		9		12		15		18	21 (Note: The castaways were divided into teams by gender, but retained their original tribal affiliations; the losing team had to vote out one castaway per tribe.)		24	28	31	34		37		40		43		45		47		52
Eliminated	Maya		Yoav		Omer		Tina		Vika		Sivan	Noam	Muli	Alex	Moshik	Vera	Guy		Liya		Idan		Shahar		Yael		Moshe		Marina
Votes	8–1–1–1		8–1–1		8–2–1		7–1–1		5–4–1		6–2	4–2–1	3–2–1	5–1	5–4	5–1–1–1	5–2–2–1		6–2–1		5–2–1		6–1		4–2		3–1–1		10–0 (Note: The two immunity challenge winners and jurors voted between the two remaining players to determine the third finalist.)
Voter	Votes																												
Naama					Omer				Vika		Sivan			Alex	Moshik	Vera	Guy		Liya		Idan		Shahar		Yael		Moshe		Marina
Noam					Omer				Vika		Sivan	Guy																	None (Note: Marina and Noam were not eligible to vote as the only eligible players they could vote for were each other.)
Dan					Omer	Yael			Naama	Sivan	Sivan			Alex	Moshik	Vera	Guy	Shahar	Liya	Liya	Idan		Shahar	Shahar	Yael	Yael	Moshe	Naama	Marina
Marina					Omer				Vika		Sivan			Alex	Moshik	Vera	Guy		Liya		Idan		Shahar		Yael		Moshe		None
Moshe					Omer				Naama		Marina	Muli	Guy	Alex	Moshik	Vera	Guy		Liya		Idan		Shahar		Naama		Marina		Marina
Yael					Sivan				Vika		Sivan			Alex	Moshik	Vera	Guy		Liya		Idan		Shahar		Naama				Marina
Shahar	Maya		Yoav				Tina								None (Note: The Double-Power challenge winner chose to stop this player from voting.)	Marina	Dan		Dan		Marina	Naama	Dan						Marina
Idan	Maya	Tina	Yoav				Tina					Noam	Muli		Naama	Moshe	Moshe		Yael		Marina								Marina
Liya	Maya		Yoav				Tina								Naama	None	Dan		Dan										Marina
Guy	Maya		Yoav				Tina					Noam	Idan		None	Yael	Moshe												Marina
Vera	Maya		Yoav				Tina								Naama	None													Marina
Moshik	Maya		Yoav				Idan	Tina				Noam	Muli		Naama														Marina
Alex					Omer				Vika		Sivan	Muli	Muli	Marina															
Muli	Maya		Yoav				Tina					Noam	Idan																
Sivan					Omer				Naama		Marina																		
Vika					Omer				Naama																				
Tina	Vera		Yoav	Guy			Shahar																						
Omer					Sivan																								
Yoav	Maya		Liya																										
Maya	Yoav																												

Jury vote
Episode	36		
Day	Reunion		
Finalist:	Dan	Noam	Naama
Vote:	5–4–0		
Juror	Vote		
Marina			Naama
Moshe			Naama
Yael		Noam	
Shahar		Noam	
Idan			Naama
Liya		Noam	
Guy			Naama
Vera		Noam	
Moshik			Naama
