= Survivor: Fans vs. Survivors =

- Season 4
- Presented by: Guy Zu-Aretz
- No. of days: 32
- No. of castaways: 16
- Winner: Natan Bashevkin
- Runner-up: Idan Kapon
- Location: Caramoan Peninsula, Camarines Sur, Philippines
- No. of episodes: 24

Release
- Original network: Channel 10
- Original release: June 6 – August 29, 2010

Additional information
- Filming dates: February 28 – April 4, 2010

Season chronology
- ← Previous; The Philippines Next → Camarines

Survivor: Fans vs. Survivors (Hebrew: הישרדות אוהדים נגד שורדים, Hisardut Ohadim Neged Soredim), also known as Survivor: All-Stars (Hebrew: הישרדות אולסטארס, Hisardut Olstars), is the fourth season of the Israeli reality TV show Survivor, which was filmed in the Philippines. The season featured a tribe of returning players competing against a tribe of new players, a format previously seen in Survivor: Micronesia — Fans vs. Favorites. It aired from February 28, 2010, to April 4, 2010, when Natan Bashevkin won. Dan Mano was named as the audience's favorite by winning a public vote.

This season brought back the Island of the Dead from the first season, where voted-out players competed against each other to return to the game. The Island of the Dead ended at the merge, at which point Exile Island from the second season, where two players were banished for 24 hours and competed against each other for rewards, was introduced. With only 16 competitors, 32 days and 24 episodes, it was the shortest season of Survivor.

== Contestants ==
| Contestant | Original tribe | Merged tribe | Main game (Note: Elimination order is based on when the contestant was voted out at Tribal Council.) | Island of the Dead |
|---|---|---|---|---|
| Ariela Kayam; 51, Netanya | Kalinga | | 1st voted out Day 3 | Lost duel 1 Day 8 |
| Osher Hadari; 25, Herzliya | Kalinga | | 2nd voted out Day 6 | Lost duel 2 Day 11 |
| Itay Strauss; Returned to game | Kalinga | | 3rd voted out Day 9 | 1st returnee Day 14 |
| Dan Mano; Returned to game | Mayon | | 4th voted out Day 9 | 2nd returnee Day 14 |
| Dar Fishelson; 21, Savyon | Kalinga | | 5th voted out Day 12 | Lost duel 3 Day 14 |
| Tal Englander; 31, Tel Aviv; The Philippines | Mayon | Sama Sama | 6th voted out 1st jury member Day 15 | |
| Marina Kabisher; 26, Tel Aviv; Caribbean Islands | Mayon | Sama Sama | 7th voted out 2nd jury member Day 15 | |
| Guy Gold; 27, Jerusalem | Kalinga | Sama Sama | 8th voted out 3rd jury member Day 18 | |
| Itay Strauss; 30, Tel Aviv | Kalinga | Sama Sama | 9th voted out 4th jury member Day 21 | |
| Maayan Porter; 28, Eilat; Pearl Islands | Mayon | Sama Sama | Eliminated (Note: For placing last in the immunity challenge on Day 24, Maayan was immediately eliminated from the game.); 5th jury member Day 24 | |
| Dan Mano; 32, Haifa; Caribbean Islands | Mayon | Sama Sama | 10th voted out 6th jury member Day 25 | |
| Mirit Vaknin; 28, Lod; Pearl Islands | Mayon | Sama Sama | 11th voted out 7th jury member Day 27 | |
| Lidar Shanny; 30, Eilat | Kalinga | Sama Sama | 12th voted out 8th jury member Day 30 | |
| Avigail Perl; 26, Tel Aviv; The Philippines | Mayon | Sama Sama | Eliminated (Note: For losing the elimination challenge on Day 31, Avigail was immediately eliminated from the game.); 9th jury member Day 31 | |
| Max "Shpex" Lewkovski; 41, Ramat Aviv | Kalinga | Sama Sama | Eliminated (Note: Shpex was eliminated during the live finale by a public vote.); 10th jury member Finale | |
| Sharon Refaeli; 27, Ra'anana | Kalinga | Sama Sama | 2nd runner-up | |
| Idan Kapon; 32, Haifa; Caribbean Islands | Mayon | Sama Sama | Runner-up | |
| Natan Bashevkin; 30, Nili; Pearl Islands | Mayon | Sama Sama | Sole Survivor | |

== Season summary ==
Pre-merge challenge winners and eliminations by cycle
| Episode(s) | Original air date(s) | Island of the Dead | | Challenge winner(s) | | | Voted out | Finish |
| Episode(s) | Original air date(s) | Winner(s) | Eliminated | Reward | Tribal immunity | Individual immunity | Voted out | Finish |
|---|---|---|---|---|---|---|---|---|
| 1 & 2 | June 6 & 8, 2010 | | | Mayon | Mayon | Itay | Ariela | 1st voted out Day 3 |
| 3 & 4 | June 13 & 15, 2010 | | | Mayon | Mayon | Lidar | Osher | 2nd voted out Day 6 |
| 5, 6 & 7 | June 20, 22 & 27, 2010 | Osher | Ariela | Kalinga | None (Note: Due to both tribes being sent to Tribal Council, there was no tribal immunity challenge.) | Dar | Itay | 3rd voted out Day 9 |
| 5, 6 & 7 | June 20, 22 & 27, 2010 | Osher | Ariela | Kalinga | None | Bashevkin | Dan | 4th voted out Day 9 |
| 7 & 8 | June 27 & 29, 2010 | Itay | Osher | Mayon | Mayon | Guy | Dar | 5th voted out Day 12 |
| 7 & 8 | June 27 & 29, 2010 | Dan | Osher | Mayon | Mayon | Guy | Dar | 5th voted out Day 12 |
| 10 (Note: The final Island of the Dead challenge aired in episode 10.) | July 12, 2010 | Itay (Note: Returned to game after winning duel.) | Dar | Tribes merged | | | | |
| 10 | July 12, 2010 | Dan | Dar | Tribes merged | | | | |

Post-merge challenge winners and eliminations by cycle
| Episode(s) | Original air date(s) | Challenge winner(s) | | | Exile Island duel | | Voted out | Finish |
| Episode(s) | Original air date(s) | Reward | Immunity | Veto | Winner | Loser | Voted out | Finish |
|---|---|---|---|---|---|---|---|---|
| 9, 10 & 11 | July 4, 12 & 13, 2010 | Tal | Bashevkin (Dan, Itay) (Note: For winning the final Island of the Dead duel, Dan and Itay received individual immunity at the next Tribal Council.) | Bashevkin | Idan | Guy | Tal | 6th voted out 1st jury member Day 15 |
| 9, 10 & 11 | July 4, 12 & 13, 2010 | Tal | Bashevkin (Dan, Itay) | Bashevkin | Idan | Guy | Marina | 7th voted out 2nd jury member Day 15 |
| 13 & 14 (Note: Episode 12 was a recap episode.) | July 18 & 20, 2010 | Dan | Maayan | Mirit | Maayan | Sharon | Guy | 8th voted out 3rd jury member Day 18 |
| 15 & 16 | July 25 & 27, 2010 | Dan, Lidar, Shpex | Bashevkin | Dan | Bashevkin | Dan | Itay | 9th voted out 4th jury member Day 21 |
| 17 & 18 | August 1 & 3, 2010 | Survivor; Auction | Avigail | Bashevkin | Lidar | Mirit | Maayan | Eliminated (Note: For placing last in the immunity challenge on Day 24, Maayan was immediately eliminated from the game.); 5th jury member Day 24 |
| 17 & 18 | August 1 & 3, 2010 | Survivor; Auction | Avigail | Bashevkin | Lidar | Mirit | Dan | 10th voted out 6th jury member Day 25 |
| 19 & 20 | August 8 & 10, 2010 | Bashevkin [Avigail, Idan] | Bashevkin | Idan | Shpex | Avigail | Mirit | 11th voted out 7th jury member Day 28 |
| 21 & 23 (Note: Episode 22 was a recap episode.) | August 15 & 22, 2010 | None | Idan | Avigail | None | | Lidar | 12th voted out 8th jury member Day 30 |
| 21 & 23 | August 15 & 22, 2010 | None | Idan | Avigail | None | | Avigail | Eliminated (Note: For losing the elimination challenge on Day 31, Avigail was immediately eliminated from the game.); 9th jury member Day 31 |
| 24 | August 29, 2010 | None | | | | | Shpex | Eliminated (Note: Shpex was eliminated during the live finale by a public vote.); 10th jury member Finale |
| 24 | August 29, 2010 | None | | | | | Jury vote | |
| 24 | August 29, 2010 | None | | | | | Sharon | 2nd runner-up |
| 24 | August 29, 2010 | None | | | | | Idan | Runner-up |
| 24 | August 29, 2010 | None | | | | | Bashevkin | Sole Survivor |

== Summary ==
=== Episodes 1–2 ===
- Reward Challenge: The tribes ran into a river filled with supplies for their camps. Once teams collected the necessary supplies, they crossed the finish line with all of their chosen supplies. The winning tribe got a boat ride to carry them and all of their belongings to their new beach home.
- Immunity Challenge: Tribes climbed over four slanted walls, then tied ropes to a large crate, which other members pulled up a slide. Once the box was on top of the slide, another member opened the crate and lit the torch inside it.
- Individual Immunity Challenge: Tribes lit a fire, which would burn through a rope. The first survivor to have their rope burnt won immunity.

==== Summary ====
The tribes moved immediately to their first challenge. The tribes played violently, and both tribes tried to stop the other's weakest member from moving. Mayon was declared the winner. As a punishment, the Kalinga tribe they unanimously voted Ariela out, who received a private helicopter ride to the beach and a clue to look for the hidden immunity idol. Max became dehydrated and was evacuated during the first night, and was therefore unable participate in the immunity challenge. Ariela could not get to the immunity idol, so she asked Guy to join in an alliance with her and get it for her. At the immunity challenge, the Mayon tribe sat out Idan, thinking that he was their weakest male. The Mayon tribe won the challenge and won flint in addition to being safe from the vote. Itay won the immunity challenge after a close finish. The Kalinga tribe went to Tribal Council and voted out Ariela by a 6–2 vote. Dar got two votes.

=== Episode 3–4 ===
- Reward Challenge: Members from each tribe took balls to shoot into a basket. The first tribe to get three baskets won and got a fishing kit, along with a day with a local who taught them tricks that would help them with life in the forest.
- Immunity Challenge: A challenge recently used in Heroes vs. Villains, one tribe member was inside a large wooden ball and three members would be blindfolded. The person in the ball directed the three blindfolded tribe mates through a path to collect a metal ball. The metal ball was placed on a tilting maze. The person in the ball directed four more blindfolded people to get the ball into the hole in the tilting maze.
- Individual Immunity Challenge: The survivors stood on a wooden pole in the ocean while two members of the other tribe tried to hit them down with sand bags. The last person on the wooden pole would win immunity.

==== Summary ====
The Kalinga tribe questioned Guy about his immunity idol after Ariela revealed it at the last Tribal Council. He lied and said that he did not have it. Everyone but Sharon believed him. Osher was evacuated due to back pains and was not there for the reward challenge, but returned afterwards. The All-Star tribe won the reward challenge 3–0. The Mayon tribe got tree mail, which stated that they had to choose two people to go to a challenge. After much arguing, Mirit and Bashevkin went. The two Mayon tribe members after the challenge, which Lidar won, returned to their beach by boat and decided to trick everyone. The Kalinga tribe went to Tribal Council. Guy used his immunity idol and Osher was voted out.

=== Episodes 5–6 ===
- Reward Challenge: Each tribe brought six huge cubes and solve a puzzle that includes the tribe's name. Kalinga won a massage done by the opposite tribe, and bottles of oils and lotions.
- Individual Immunity Challenge: This challenge was used in Survivor: Samoa, Mayon (Bashevkin), and Survivor: Micronesia, Kalinga (Dar).
- Tribal Council: Both tribes eliminated a tribemate. Kalinga tribe voted out Itay because of his bossiness around camp. The Mayon tribe voted Dan out 5–3.

=== Episodes 7–8 ===
- Reward Challenge: The two tribes balanced on rolling logs. The first person to lose balance and fall does not get a point. Mayon tribe won 8-4 and received a bath, with lotions presented by Ahava.
- Immunity challenge: Each tribe split into pairs and one person had to decide how many bags to put on the opposite tribe's rope. Lidar fainted in the middle of the challenge. Dar lost focus and dropped the bags. Due to that, the Kalinga tribe lost their fourth immunity challenge in a row. Mayon tribe sent one member to go to the Kalinga tribe to vote at Tribal Council.
- At Tribal Council, Dar was eliminated.

.

=== Episode 16–17 ===
- Survivor Auction: There was no Reward Challenge, and a Survivor Auction was held instead.

| Contestants | Item(s) |
|---|---|
| Avigail | Shakshuka (₱1000) |
| Dan | Help in the next immunity challenge (₱1000) |
| Maayan | Darbuka and a glass of water |
| Shpex | Huge slice of chocolate cake (₱1000) |
| Mirit | Sandwich with Hellman's dressings (₱450) |
| Sharon | Lahing (₱340) |
| Lidar | A new training and a help in the next prize challenge |
| Bashevkin | A bowl of rice (₱360) and an mp3 player (₱200) |
| Idan | Half of any meal he chooses to have (₱700) |

== Voting history ==
| | Original tribes | | | | | Merged tribe | | | | | | | | | |
| Episode # | 2 | 4 | 6 | 7 | 8 | 11 | | 14 | 16 | 18 | | 20 | 23 | | 24 |
|---|---|---|---|---|---|---|---|---|---|---|---|---|---|---|---|
| Day # | 3 | 6 | 9 | | 12 | 15 | | 18 | 21 | 24 | 25 | 28 | 30 | 31 | Finale |
| Eliminated | Ariela | Osher | Itay | Dan | Dar | Tal | Marina | Guy | Itay | Maayan | Dan | Mirit | Lidar | Avigail | Shpex |
| Votes | 6–2 | 2–1–0 (Note: Guy played a hidden immunity idol on himself, therefore four votes against him were not counted.) | 4–2 | 5–3 | 3–3 (Note: The initial vote resulted in a tie between Dar and Shpex; as such, the tie was resolved by a firemaking competition, which Shpex won.) | 9–3 | 6–4–2 | 7–1–1–1 | 4–4–1 (Note: The initial vote resulted in a tie between Dan and Itay; as such, the tie was resolved by a firemaking competition, which Dan won.) | Challenge (Note: For placing last in the immunity challenge on Day 24, Maayan was immediately eliminated from the game.) | 5–1–1 | 4–1–1 | 4–1 | Challenge (Note: For losing the elimination challenge on Day 31, Avigail was immediately eliminated from the game.) | Israel’s vote |
| Voter | Vote | | | | | | | | | | | | | | |
| Bashevkin | | | | Dan | | Tal | Marina | Guy | Itay | | Shpex | Lidar | Lidar | | |
| Idan | | | | Dan | | Tal | Marina | Guy | Itay | | Dan | Mirit | Lidar | | |
| Sharon | Ariela | ~~Guy~~ | Itay | | Dar | Tal | Guy | Guy | Itay | | Dan | Mirit | None (Note: This castaway was given the veto bracelet, and was therefore not eligible to vote.) | | |
| Shpex | Ariela | Osher | Itay | | Dar | Tal | Marina | Guy | Dan | | Dan | Mirit | Lidar | | |
| Avigail | | | | Dan | Shpex (Note: For winning the immunity challenge, Mayon got to send a tribe member to attend and vote in Kalinga's Tribal Council; they sent Avigail.) | Tal | Marina | Itay | Dan | | None | Mirit | Lidar | | |
| Lidar | Ariela | ~~Guy~~ | Itay | | Dar | Tal | Marina | Guy | Dan | | Dan | None | Shpex | | |
| Mirit | | | | Dan | | Tal | Guy | Guy | Dan | | Dan | Shpex | | | |
| Dan | | | | Mirit | | Shpex | Shpex | None | Itay | | Bashevkin | | | | |
| Maayan | | | | Dan | | Tal | Marina | Guy | None | | | | | | |
| Itay | Ariela | ~~Guy~~ | Guy | | | Shpex | Shpex | Avigail | Idan | | | | | | |
| Guy | Dar | Osher | Itay | | Shpex | Tal | Shpex | Dan | | | | | | | |
| Marina | | | | Mirit | | Shpex | Shpex | | | | | | | | |
| Tal | | | | Mirit | | None | | | | | | | | | |
| Dar | Ariela | ~~Guy~~ | Guy | | Shpex | | | | | | | | | | |
| Osher | Ariela | Shpex | | | | | | | | | | | | | |
| Ariela | Dar | | | | | | | | | | | | | | |

Jury vote
| Episode # | 24 | | |
|---|---|---|---|
| Finalist: | Sharon | Idan | Bashevkin |
| Votes: | 5–3–2 | | |
| Juror | Vote | | |
| Shpex | Sharon | | |
| Avigail | | Idan | |
| Lidar | Sharon | | |
| Mirit | | | Bashevkin |
| Dan | | | Bashevkin |
| Maayan | | | Bashevkin |
| Itay | | Idan | |
| Guy | | Idan | |
| Marina | | | Bashevkin |
| Tal | | | Bashevkin |
