= HaMerotz LaMillion 5 =

Season of television series

- Season 5
- Presented by: Ron Shahar
- No. of teams: 14
- Winners: Amit & Raz Gal
- No. of legs: 13
- Distance traveled: 37,200 km (23,100 mi)
- No. of episodes: 36 (38 including recaps)

Release
- Original network: Channel 2
- Original release: 17 May – 26 September 2016

Additional information
- Filming dates: 6 November – 4 December 2015

Series chronology
- ← Previous; Season 4 Next → Season 6

HaMerotz LaMillion 5 is the fifth season of HaMerotz LaMillion (Hebrew: המירוץ למיליון, lit. The Race to the Million), an Israeli reality competition show based on the American series The Amazing Race. Hosted by Ron Shahar, it featured fourteen teams of two with a pre-existing relationship in a race around the Eastern Hemisphere to win ₪1,000,000. This season visited four continents and ten countries and traveled over 37,200 kilometres (23,100 mi) during thirteen legs. Starting in Tel Aviv and Yavne, racers traveled through Israel, Italy, Romania, Namibia, Tanzania, India, South Korea, Vietnam, Cambodia, and Australia before finishing in Melbourne and learning the results in Tel Aviv. This season premiered on 17 May 2016 on Channel 2 with the finale on 26 September 2016.

Father and son Amit and Raz Gal were the winners of this season. Amit, who was at the age of 63 at time of filming and turned 64 during the course of filming, surpassed David O'Leary of The Amazing Race 24 (59 at time of filming) as the oldest winner in any edition of The Amazing Race. At a combined age of 96, Amit & Raz are also the oldest team to win any edition of The Amazing Race. Friends Lee Hadad and Tal Alkobi finished second, and French New Olim Joezi Zirah and Alex Amar finished third.

== Production ==
=== Development and filming ===
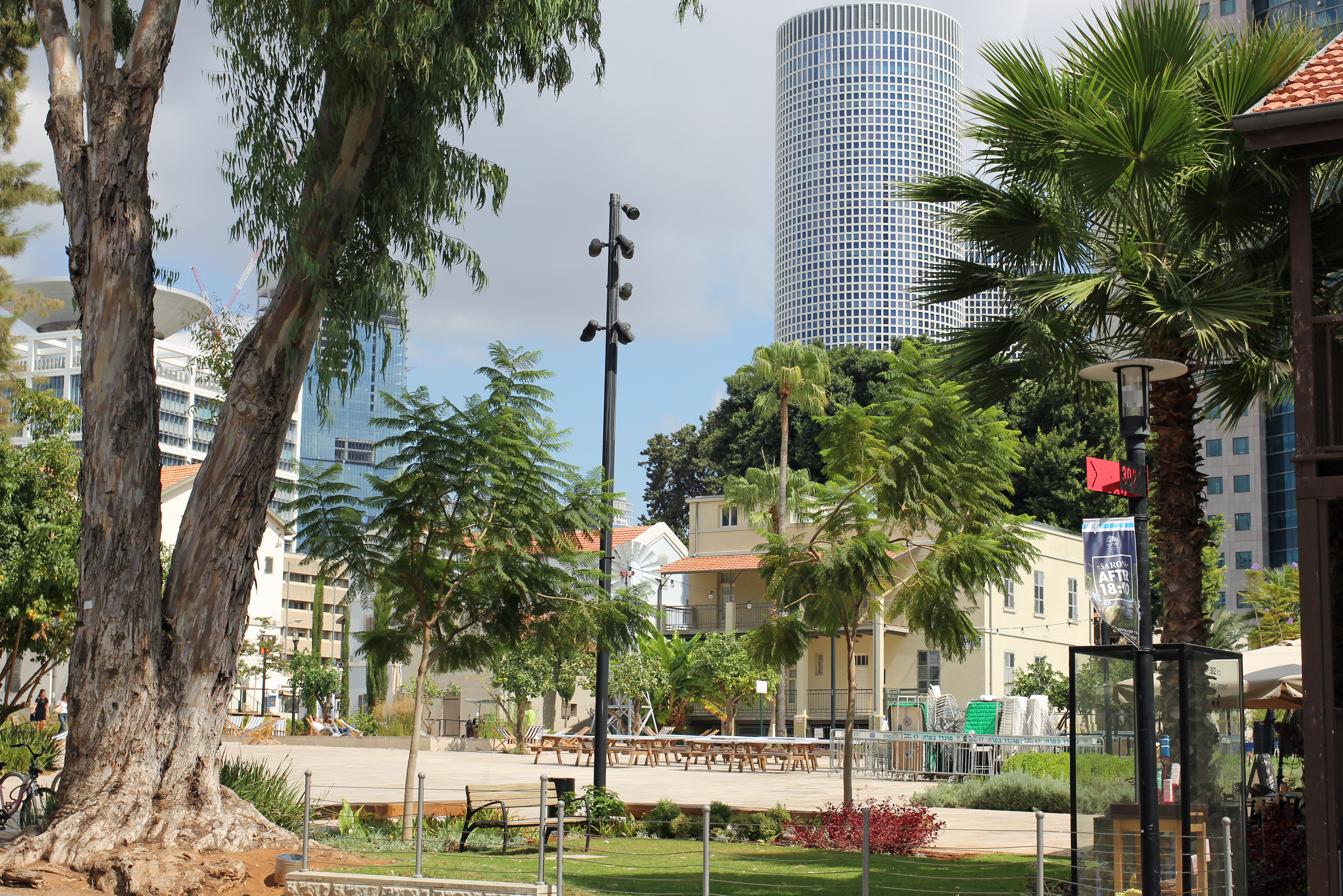

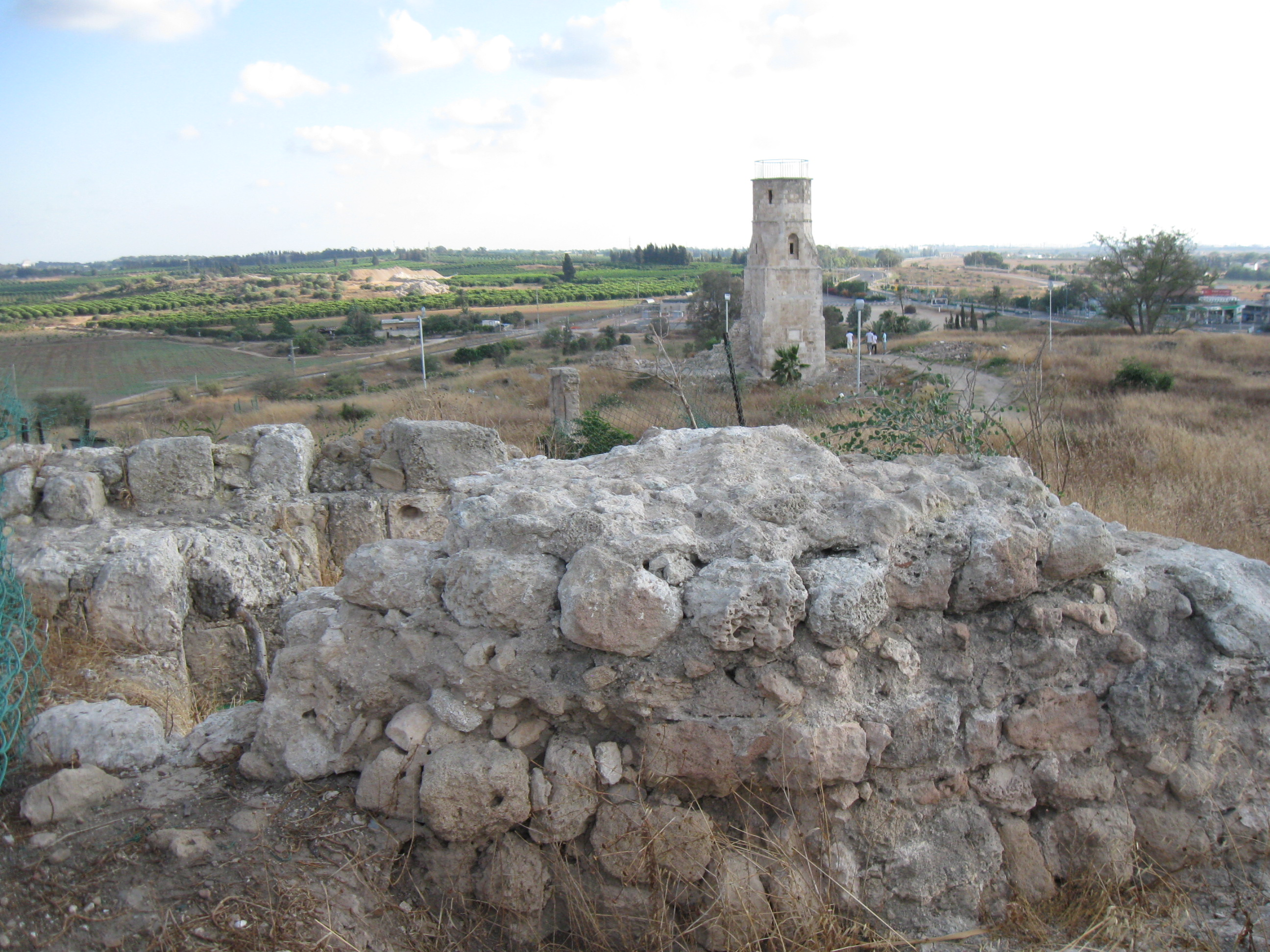
The neighborhood of Sarona in Tel Aviv and Tel Yavne in Yavne served as dual starting lines.

This season traversed four continents and ten countries. Much like the previous season, the first leg began with fourteen teams that were split into two groups of seven. Both groups of seven teams would run a leg in Israel resulting in two teams eliminated. Unlike the previous season, both groups of seven teams were aware of each other. While in Vietnam, the normal red and yellow route markers were used, unlike the first season in which the route markers were replaced with yellow and white flags to avoid confusion with the former South Vietnamese national flag, following recent editions of The Amazing Race where the normal red & yellow route markers were used. Similar to last season, teams' overall placements were determined when teams checked-in at an empty Pit Stop mat at the Hedgend Maze in Australia, and teams had to return to Ariel Sharon Park to learn of their final placement.

Darryn Lyons, the mayor of Geelong, Australia at the time of filming, appeared as the Pit Stop greeter during the penultimate leg.

== Cast ==
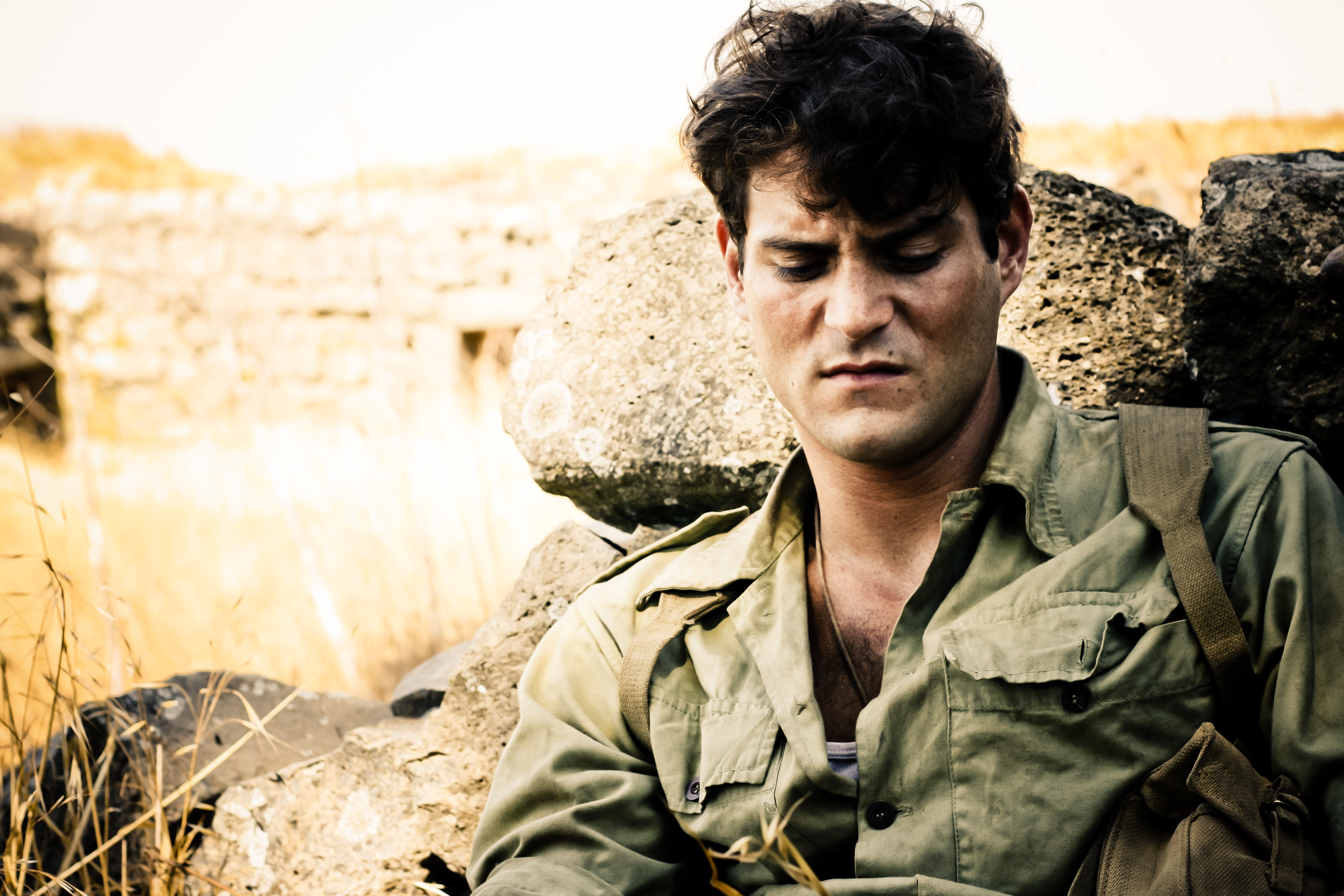
Adriano Jauvel

The cast for this season included actor and model Adriano Jauvel and former Hapoel Galil Elyon manager Amit Gal.

Contestants	Age	Relationship	Hometown	Status
Avi Manasherov (אבי)	29	Childhood Friends	Netanya	Eliminated 1st (in Rishon LeZion, Israel)
Avi Koren (אבי)	29	Childhood Friends	Herzliya	Eliminated 1st (in Rishon LeZion, Israel)
Yossi Abdu (יוסי)	23	Friends	Yagel	Eliminated 2nd (in Tel Aviv, Israel)
Lee Malka (לי)	21	Friends	Herzliya	Eliminated 2nd (in Tel Aviv, Israel)
Shira Avraham (שירה)	22	Co-Workers	Petah Tikva	Eliminated 3rd (in Rome, Italy)
Bar Sommer (בר)	22	Co-Workers	Ganei Am	Eliminated 3rd (in Rome, Italy)
Dor Sason (דור)	24	Met on a Dating App	Holon	Eliminated 4th (in Rome, Italy)
Sapir Aharon (ספיר)	24	Met on a Dating App	Bat Yam	Eliminated 4th (in Rome, Italy)
Gali Berger (גלי)	24	Dating 9 Years	Kiryat Motzkin	Eliminated 5th (in Brașov, Romania)
Daniel Bardugo (דניאל)	24	Dating 9 Years	Kiryat Bialik	Eliminated 5th (in Brașov, Romania)
Naomi Alafi (נעמי)	30	Sisters-in-Law	Jerusalem	Eliminated 6th (in Swakopmund, Namibia)
Hen Toledano-Alafi (חן)	25	Sisters-in-Law	Tel Aviv	Eliminated 6th (in Swakopmund, Namibia)
Monada Kancepolsky (מונדה)	26	Dating	Netanya	Eliminated 7th (in Nungwi, Tanzania)
Adriano Jauvel (אדריאנו)	30	Dating	Netanya	Eliminated 7th (in Nungwi, Tanzania)
Shon Cohen (שון)	24	Friends	Tel Aviv	Eliminated 8th (in Delhi, India)
Kim Weiss (קים)	22	Friends	Tel Baruch	Eliminated 8th (in Delhi, India)
Ben Scheflan (בן)	25	Brothers	Brooklyn, New York	Eliminated 9th (in Hanoi, Vietnam)
Ori Scheflan (אורי)	22	Brothers	Tel Aviv	Eliminated 9th (in Hanoi, Vietnam)
Yael Carmon (יעל)	27	Cousins	Tel Aviv	Eliminated 10th (in Siem Reap, Cambodia)
Yosiel Neeman (יוסיאל)	23	Cousins	Holon	Eliminated 10th (in Siem Reap, Cambodia)
Tzion Azoulay (ציון)	25	Soccer Players	Bat Yam	Eliminated 11th (in Geelong, Australia)
Aviv Kordova (אביב)	25	Soccer Players	Holon	Eliminated 11th (in Geelong, Australia)
Jonathan "Joezi" Zirah (ג'וזי)	28	New Olim from France	Tel Aviv	Third Place
Alex Amar (אלכס)	26	New Olim from France	Netanya	Third Place
Lee Hadad (לי)	26	Friends	Rehovot	Second Place
Tal Alkobi (טל)	27	Friends	Ashdod	Second Place
Amit Gal (עמית)	63	Father & Son	Amir	Winners
Raz Gal (רז)	32	Father & Son	Tel Aviv	Winners

=== Future appearances ===
Ben and Ori and Yael and Yosiel competed on HaMerotz LaMillion 8.

Jonathan "Joezi" Zirah later competed on the ninth season of the Israeli edition of Survivor with Season 4 contestant Ruth "Alexa Dol" Dolgakov. Joezi was the seventh person eliminated after losing a duel and the first member of the jury. In 2020, Joezi competed on the eleventh season of the Israeli edition of Big Brother and finished as the runner-up.

== Results ==
The following teams participated in this season, with their relationships at the time of filming. Note that this table is not necessarily reflective of all content broadcast on television due to inclusion or exclusion of some data. Placements are listed in finishing order:

Team	Position (by leg)														Roadblocks performed
Team	1^{1}		2	3+	4+	5	6+	7	8	9+	10+	11	12	13	Roadblocks performed
Amit & Raz	1st		8th	6th	7th	2nd»	4th»	1st	1st⋑	2nd>	3rd⊃	1st>	2nd	1st	Amit 1, Raz 3
Lee & Tal		4th	1st⊃	7th»	8th	4th«	8th«	5th⊃	5th⊃	3rd	4th	3rd	1st	2nd	Lee 3, Tal 1
Joezi & Alex	6th		6th	5th>	3rd	1st»	1st»	3rd	3rd^{⋐}_{⊃}	6th<	2nd⊂–	4th<	3rd	3rd	Joezi 3, Alex 1
Tzion & Aviv		2nd	3rd⊃	4th^{<}_{≥}	4th	9th«	2nd«	6th	4th⋑	1st>	5th⊃	2nd>	4th		Tzion 2, Aviv 2
Yael & Yosiel	2nd		9th	9th	2nd<	5th<	7th<	7th⊂	2nd^{⊂}_{⋑}	4th>	1st⊃	5th>			Yael 2, Yosiel 2
Ben & Ori		3rd	10th	8th	9th>	7th>	6th>	2nd⊃	6th	5th–	6th				Ben 2, Ori 1
Shon & Kim		5th	4th⊃	2nd≥	5th>	6th>	5th>	4th⊃	7th⊃						Shon 2, Kim 1
Adriano & Monada	4th		2nd	1st»	1st»	3rd»	3rd»	8th							Adriano 2, Monada 1
Naomi & Hen	3rd		5th	10th^{«}_{»}^{2}	6th»	8th»	9th»–								Naomi 2, Hen 1
Gali & Daniel		1st	7th	3rd^{«}_{»}	10th«–										Gali 2, Daniel 0
Dor & Sapir	5th		11th⊂	11th^{≤}_{>} –											Dor 0, Sapir 1
Shira & Bar		6th	12th⊃												Shira 0, Bar 0
Yossi & Lee		7th													Yossi 0, Lee 0
Avi & Avi	7th														Avi M. 0, Avi K. 0

Key

- A red team placement means the team was eliminated.
- A blue team placement indicates that the team was the last to arrive at a Pit Stop in a non-elimination leg.
- An orange + indicates that there was a Duel on this leg, while an orange − indicates the team that lost the Duel and received a 15-minute penalty.
- A brown ⊂ or cyan ⋑ indicates the team who received a U-Turn; ⊃ or ⋐ indicates that the team voted for the recipient.
- A yellow <, orange «, olive ≤ or red « indicates the team who received a Yield; >, », ≥ and » indicates that the team voted for the recipient.

Notes

1. Leg 1 was split into two halves. Seven of the teams completed the first part of the leg in Tel Aviv, while the other seven completed the second part in Yavne. Those who were still racing from the first group would meet up with the second group in Tel Aviv.
2. Naomi & Hen chose to forfeit the Duel against Joezi & Alex, but continued to compete afterwards.

=== Voting history ===
Teams may vote to choose either U-Turn or Yield. The team with the most votes received the U-Turn or Yield penalty, depending on the respective leg.

	U-Turn	Yield	Yield	Yield	Yield	U-Turn	U-Turn	Yield	U-Turn	Yield
Leg	2	3	4	5	6	7	8	9	10	11
U-Turned/Yielded	Dor & Sapir	Dor & Sapir; Gali & Daniel; Naomi & Hen; Tzion & Aviv	Gali & Daniel; Yael & Yosiel	Lee & Tal; Tzion & Aviv; Yael & Yosiel	Lee & Tal; Tzion & Aviv; Yael & Yosiel	Yael & Yosiel	Yael & Yosiel; Joezi & Alex	Joezi & Alex	Joezi & Alex	Joezi & Alex
Result	4–3–2–1–1–1	2–2–2–2–1–1–1	2–2–1–1–1–1–1–1	2–2–2–1–1–1	2–2–2–1–1–1	3–2–1–1–1	3–3–1	3–2–1	3–2–1	3–1–1
Voter	Team's Vote									
Amit & Raz	Lee & Tal	Lee & Tal	Lee & Tal	Lee & Tal	Lee & Tal	Ben & Ori	Joezi & Alex	Joezi & Alex	Joezi & Alex	Joezi & Alex
Lee & Tal	Dor & Sapir	Naomi & Hen	Amit & Raz	Amit & Raz	Amit & Raz	Yael & Yosiel	Yael & Yosiel	Yael & Yosiel	Yael & Yosiel	Yael & Yosiel
Joezi & Alex	Tzion & Aviv	Tzion & Aviv	Tzion & Aviv	Tzion & Aviv	Tzion & Aviv	Tzion & Aviv	Yael & Yosiel	Yael & Yosiel	Yael & Yosiel	Amit & Raz
Tzion & Aviv	Dor & Sapir	Dor & Sapir	Joezi & Alex	Joezi & Alex	Naomi & Hen	Joezi & Alex	Joezi & Alex	Joezi & Alex	Joezi & Alex	Joezi & Alex
Yael & Yosiel	Ben & Ori	Ben & Ori	Ben & Ori	Ben & Ori	Shon & Kim	Ben & Ori	Joezi & Alex	Joezi & Alex	Joezi & Alex	Joezi & Alex
Ben & Ori	Yael & Yosiel	Yael & Yosiel	Yael & Yosiel	Yael & Yosiel	Yael & Yosiel	Yael & Yosiel	Tzion & Aviv	Tzion & Aviv	Tzion & Aviv	
Shon & Kim	Dor & Sapir	Dor & Sapir	Yael & Yosiel	Yael & Yosiel	Yael & Yosiel	Yael & Yosiel	Yael & Yosiel			
Adriano & Monada	Lee & Tal	Gali & Daniel	Gali & Daniel	Lee & Tal	Lee & Tal	Lee & Tal				
Naomi & Hen	Lee & Tal	Gali & Daniel	Gali & Daniel	Tzion & Aviv	Tzion & Aviv					
Gali & Daniel	Naomi & Hen	Naomi & Hen	Naomi & Hen							
Dor & Sapir	Tzion & Aviv	Tzion & Aviv								
Shira & Bar	Dor & Sapir									

== Episode Titles ==
Translated from Hebrew from the official website:

1. The Premiere Launch off (הזנקת הבכורה) (Leg 1)
2. The New Teams Arrive (הזוגות החדשים מגיעים) (Leg 1)
3. Landing in Italy (נוחתים באיטליה) (Leg 2)
4. Climbing in Italy (מטפסים באיטליה) (Leg 2)
5. Who Will Be Eliminated in Rome? (מי יודח ברומא?) (Leg 2)
6. Fast and Furious (מהיר ועצבני) (Leg 3)
7. Lost in Italy (אבודים באיטליה) (Leg 3)
8. Leaving Italy in an Elimination Episode (נפרדים מאיטליה בפרק הדחה) (Leg 3)
9. Landing in Romania (נוחתים ברומניה) (Leg 4)
10. The Dark Side of Romania (הצד האפל של רומניה) (Leg 4)
11. The Final Elimination in Europe (הדחה אחרונה באירופה) (Leg 4)
12. Landing in Africa (נוחתים באפריקה) (Leg 5)
13. Elimination in Africa (הדחה באפריקה) (Leg 5)
14. Summit of Fear (פסגת הפחד) (Leg 6)
15. The Mountain of Salt (הר המלח) (Leg 6)
16. Dunes or Not to Be (דיונות או לא להיות) (Leg 6)
17. Landing in Zanzibar (נוחתים בזנזיבר) (Leg 7)
18. Dancing in Africa (רוקדים באפריקה) (Leg 7)
19. Leaving Zanzibar with an Elimination (נפרדים מזנזיבר בהדחה) (Leg 7)
20. Landing in India (נוחתים בהודו) (Leg 8)
21. Indian Wedding (חתונה הודית) (Leg 8)
22. A Colorful Farewell from India (פרידה צבעונית מהודו) (Leg 8)
23. Welcome to South Korea (ברוכים הבאים לדרום קוריאה) (Leg 9)
24. The Mission of the Century (משימת המאה) (Leg 9)
25. Korean Karaoke (קריוקי קוריאני) (Leg 9)
26. Who Will Be Eliminated in Korea? (מי יודח בקוריאה?) (Leg 9)
27. The Big Six (ששת הגדולים) (Recap)
28. Landing in Vietnam (נוחתים בוויאטנם) (Leg 10)
29. The Rice Mountain (הר האורז) (Leg 10)
30. Leaving Vietnam (נפרדים מוויאטנם) (Leg 10)
31. Landing in Cambodia (נוחתים בקמבודיה) (Leg 11)
32. The Bike Race (מירוץ האופניים) (Leg 11)
33. Leaving Cambodia with an Elimination (נפרדים מקמבודיה בהדחה) (Leg 11)
34. Semifinals in Australia (חצי הגמר באוסטרליה) (Leg 12)
35. The Semifinals (חצי הגמר) (Leg 12)
36. The Last Elimination (ההדחה האחרונה) (Leg 12)
37. Grand Finale (הגמר הגדול) (Leg 13)
38. Reunion (האיחוד) (Recap)

== Race summary ==
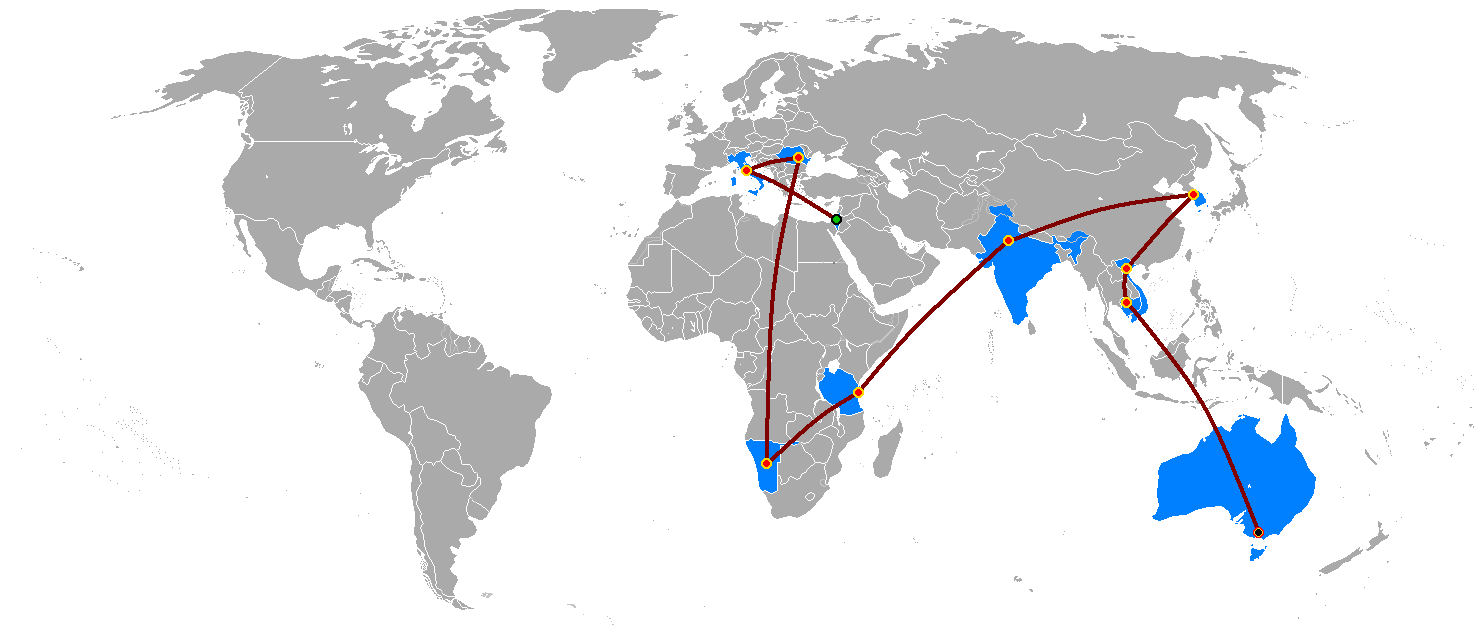
Complete route map

Destinations	Air travel Rail travel Water travel Bus travel Helicopter travel Bicycle travel Gondola travel
Route Markers	צומת (Detour) מחסום (Roadblock) דו–קרב (Duel) סיבוב פרסה (U-Turn) עצור (Yield) נקודת סיום (Pit Stop)

=== Leg 1 (Israel) ===
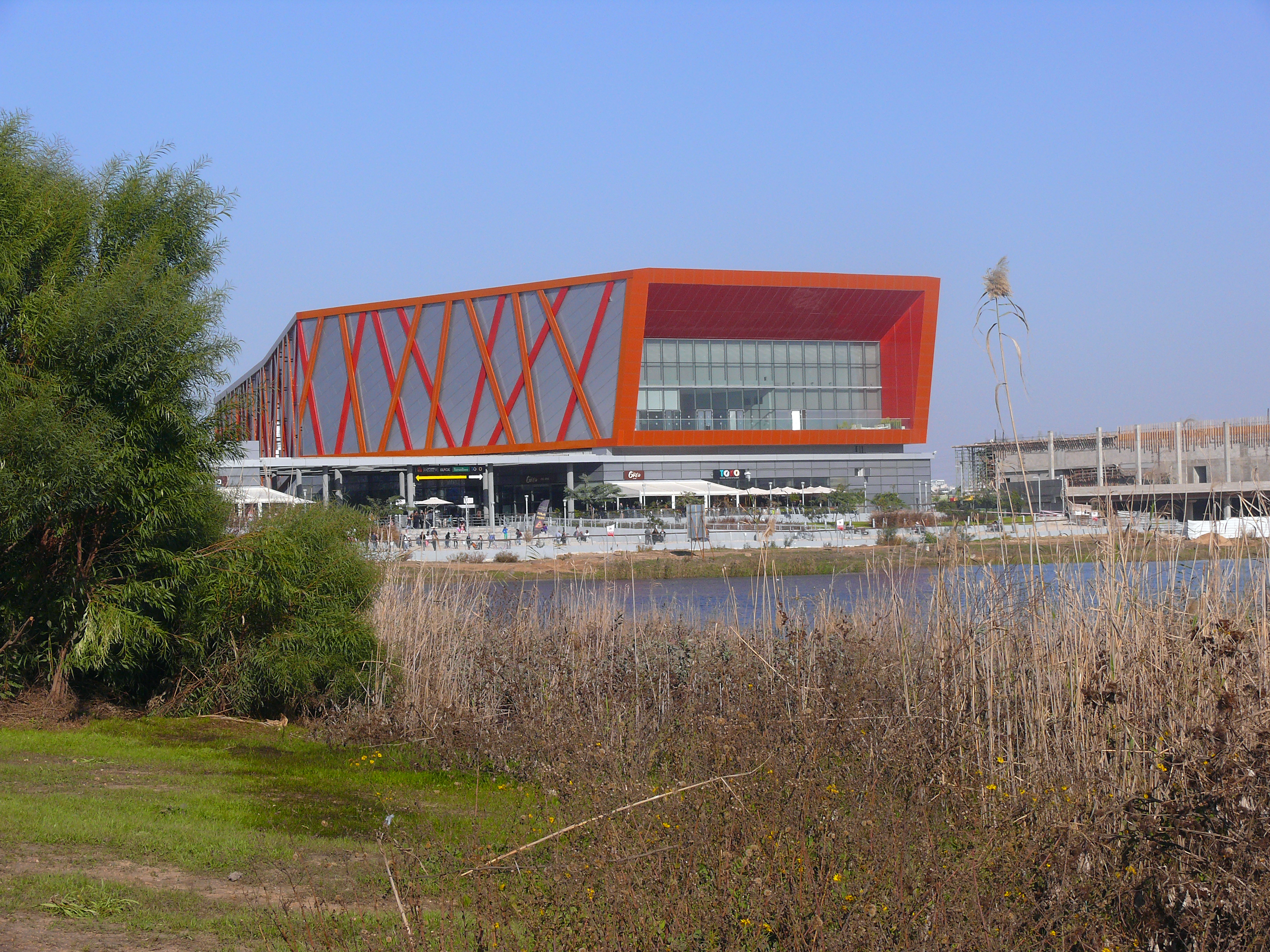
Teams visited Yes Planet in Rishon LeZion to complete a Hollywood themed task.

Group A

Airdate: 17 May 2016

- Tel Aviv, Israel (Sarona) (Starting Line)
- Tel Aviv (Yarkon Park)
- Tel Aviv (Rothschild Boulevard #1)
- Tel Aviv (Derech HaShalom Street #32–34)
- Rishon LeZion (Yes Planet – 4DX Cinema)
- Rishon LeZion (Yes Planet – Agamon Rishon LeZion)

Additional tasks

- At Yarkon Park, teams had to climb up a shaky rope ladder to a giant billboard which held a giant scratch ticket. Teams then had to balance on a pair of pegs that they had to move from slot to slot in order to reach the whole board. Using two giant Shekel coins, teams had to scratch off the board to reveal the message hidden underneath ("The world is waiting for you!") to receive their next clue.
- At Rothschild Boulevard #1, teams would find a large array of trash bins. Each trash bin had either a bottle or paper that they had to look for, but only some of them were marked with the show logo. If a team found one of the items but it was not marked, they had to properly recycle them in one of the recycling bins, and put the trash back in their original bin. Once the team found either the marked bottle or paper, they could exchange it for the next clue.
- After the trash task teams received only a piece of music sheet, which they then had to decipher using the help of the locals in order to play the song "Derech HaShalom" by Pe'er Tasi. At the bottom of the sheet teams would find written the numbers "32–34". Combining both informations, teams had to make their way to Derech HaShalom Street #32–34, where Pe'er Tasi in person would hand them their next clue.
- At Yes Planet's 4DX Cinema in Rishon LeZion, teams had to watch seven scenes of different movies with famous Hollywood actors on them. Then, teams had to correctly pick and arrange stars with the actors names written on them. If the teams correctly guessed all seven stars, they would be allowed in the cinema's VIP room, where they would see the location of the Pit Stop displayed on the screen. If teams were wrong, they would have to eat a full bag of popcorn in the 4DX cinema before trying again.

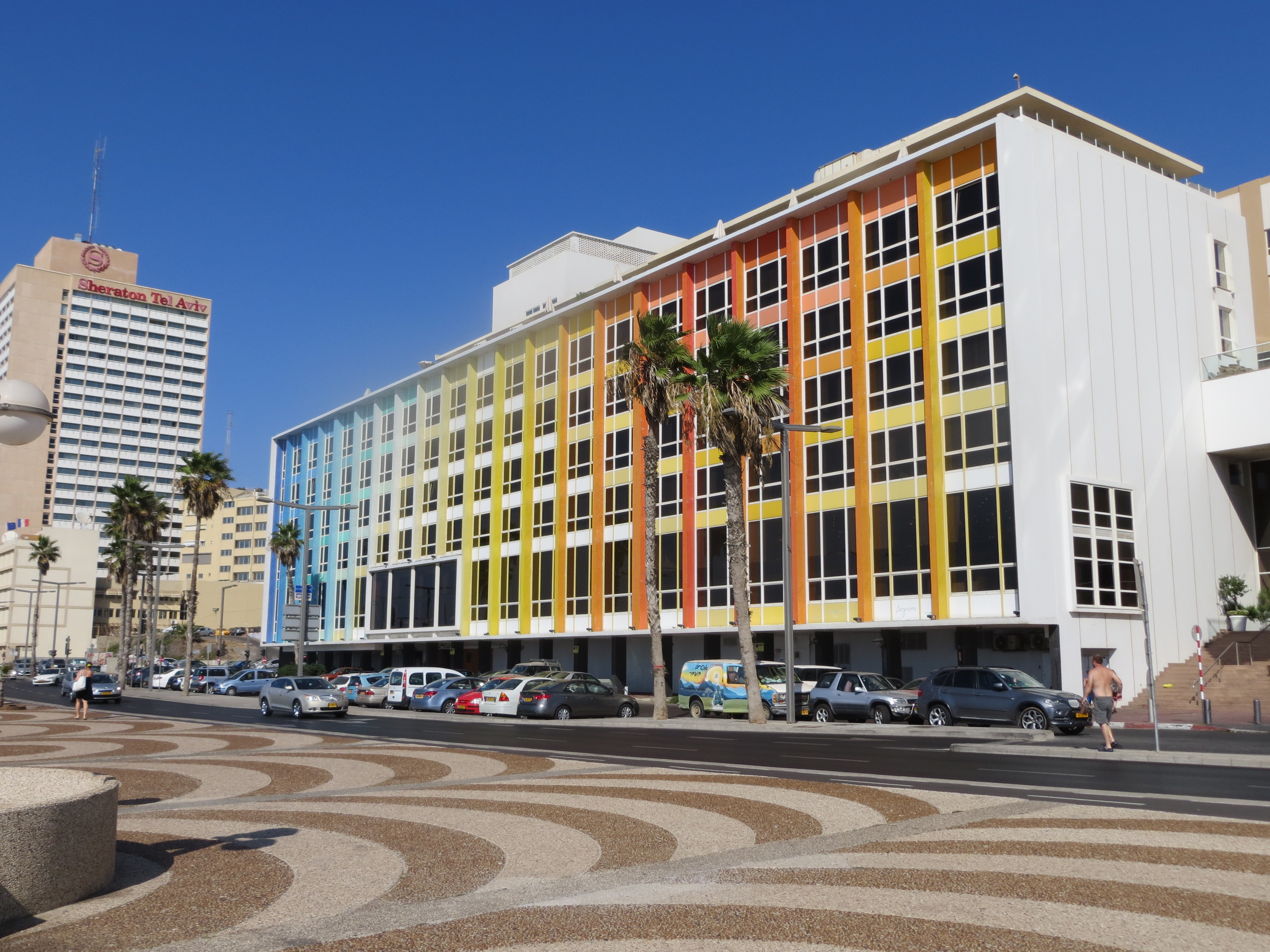
Teams satisfied the requirements of a Lady Gaga impersonator in the Dan Hotel in Tel Aviv.

Group B

Airdate: 22 May 2016

- Yavne, Israel (Tel Yavne) (Starting Line)
- Yavne (Water Tower)
- Tel Aviv, Tel Aviv District (Dan Hotel)
- Tel Aviv (Paz Filling Station – Yellow Market)
- Tel Aviv (Ben-Gurion House)
- Tel Aviv (Ariel Sharon Park)

Additional tasks

- At Yavne's water tower, the second group of teams had to fill a bucket of water and bring it to the top of the tower while sitting on a suspended scaffold and using chains to go up and balance the scaffold. Once at the top, teams would have to fill an empty bucket, which would go down and then would release their car's keys. If teams didn't bring enough water to make the bucket go down, they would have to descend and bring another bucket of water.
- At the Dan Hotel in Tel Aviv, teams had to choose between two tasks. In the first task, one team member had to sit in a bathtub while the other team member had to fill the tub with ice in order to decrease the temperature to eight degrees celsius. In the second task, teams had to form the figure of two kissing swans using towels per the hotel's standards. Once teams completed either task, they had to bring a tower of coloured chocolates to the room of a Lady Gaga impersonator named "Lady Chacha" and give her a compliment before receiving their next clue.
- The clue instructed teams to make their way to the "nearby yellow", which teams had to figure out was a Yellow Market inside a Paz Filling Station. Once there, teams would receive a coffee with cream and a basket with their next clue, which instructed teams to convince a local to let them prepare "Ben Gurion Rice" in their house, while using the given oil, cooking pot and ptitim that teams either bought or got from the local. Once cooked, teams would have to take the Ben Gurion Rice to the Ben-Gurion House, where a man would approve or disapprove the meal. If the meal was correctly cooked, teams would receive their next clue.
- Teams received the instruction to make their way to the next Pit Stop, "the park named after the eleventh Prime Minister of Israel". Teams had to figure out that the largest park in Israel is the Ariel Sharon Park, formerly a waste dump in Tel Aviv.

=== Leg 2 (Israel → Italy) ===
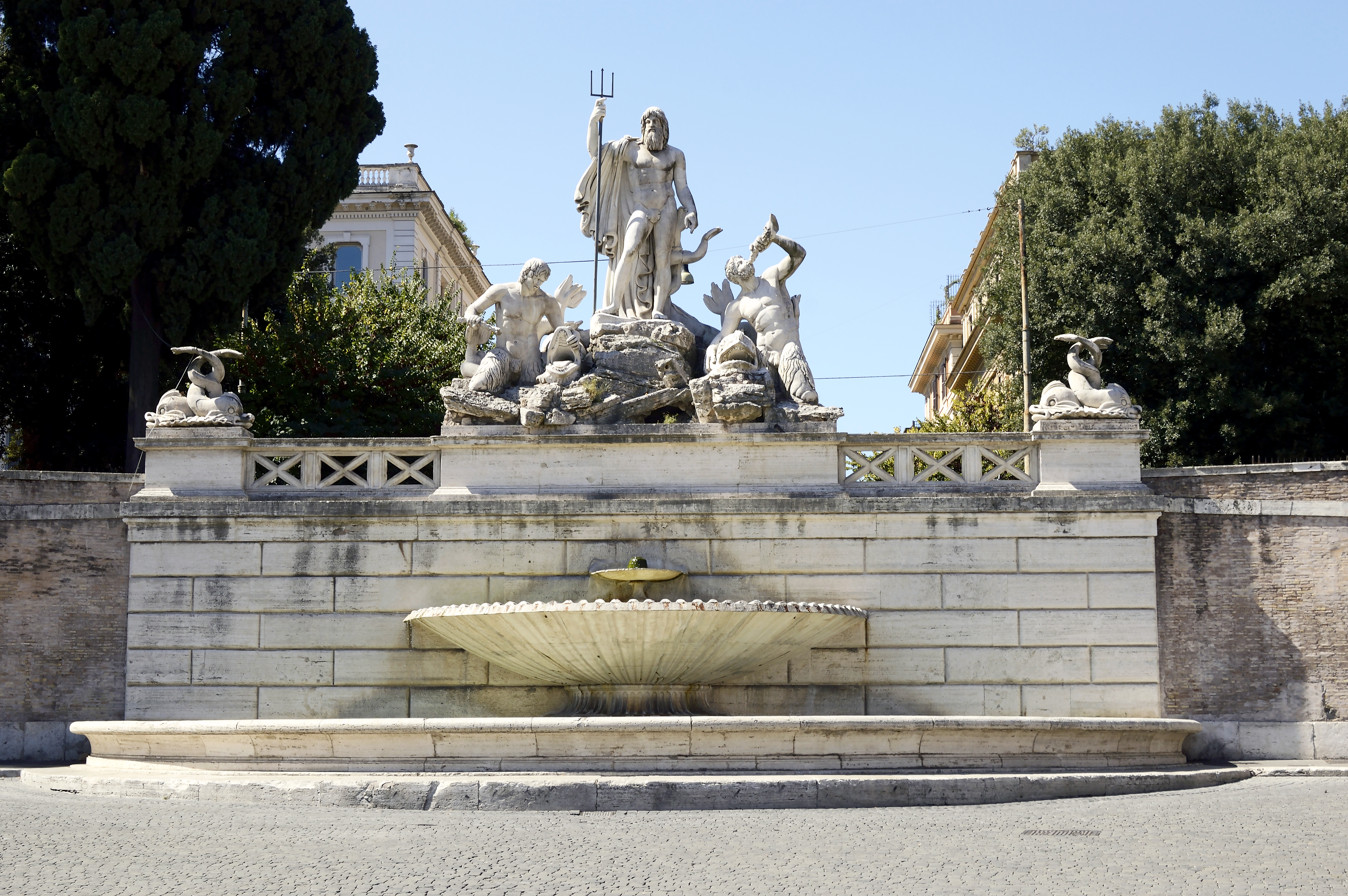
In Piazza del Popolo teams had to impersonate the characters found on the Fontana del Nettuno.

Airdates: 24, 29 & 31 May 2016

- Tel Aviv (Ben Gurion Airport) to Rome, Italy (Leonardo da Vinci–Fiumicino Airport)
- Fiumicino (Leonardo da Vinci–Fiumicino Airport – Parking Lot C)
- Rome (Ristorante Antico Casale La Carovana)
- Rome (Piazza Benedetto Cairoli)
- Rome (Antica Norcineria Viola or Beppe e i Suoi Formaggi)
- Rome (Piazza Benedetto Cairoli)
- Rome (Piazza del Popolo – Fontana del Nettuno)
- Rome (Piazza Pia – Via della Conciliazione Intersection)
- Rome (Piazza Navona – Sant'Agnese in Agone)
- Rome (Pizzeria Disco Volante)
- Rome (Piazza Regina Margherita)
- Rome (Colosseum)

This season's first Detour was a choice between בָּשָׂר (Basar – Meat) or חלב (Halav – Dairy). In Meat, teams had to make their way to Antica Norcineria Viola, where they had to taste and distinguish nine different varieties of salami, and then correctly label the salamis located on a stall outside the store to receive their next clue. In Dairy, teams had to make their way to Beppe e i Suoi Formaggi cheese store and then proceed to grate at least 1.5 kilograms (3.3 lb) of parmesan cheese using a small circular grater to receive their next clue. Teams found the U-turn reveal board on a nearby park.

Additional tasks

- After arriving in Rome, teams had to make their way to the parking lot C of Leonardo da Vinci–Fiumicino Airport and find Maurizio, who would hand them their car keys and the next clue. In their clue, teams received an incomplete sticker of the Vitruvian Man by Leonardo da Vinci, which they had to use to find the other part of the sticker located on the rear windshield of their car.
- At Ristorante Antico Casale La Carovana, teams had to retrieve different kinds of pasta with a large spoon from a boiling cooking pot and then search in the hot pasta for sixteen letters. Then, using some of the letters, teams had to find a word related to the Italian cuisine, which was Parmigiano Reggiano to receive their next clue. Before departing, teams had to vote for the team they wanted to U-Turn.
- After the Detour, teams had to find out who the God of the sea is in the Roman Mythology, Neptune. After figuring it out, teams had to make their way to Piazza del Popolo and find the next clue at Neptune's Fountain. For their next task, teams had to dress up as the figures on the fountain, Neptune and his trident, accompanied by two tritons. Teams had to don costumes and paint their faces, neck, legs and arms, but since the fountain has three characters, they had to convince a local to dress up as one of the characters. Teams then had to earn ten Euros and give the money to the Neptune impersonator to receive their next clue.
- The clue teams received instructed them to go to where the "white smoke can be seen", and they had to figure out their next destination was the intersection of Piazza Pia and Via della Conciliazione, from which St. Peter's Basilica in the Vatican City can be seen. There, both team members had to stack bottle crates, while one of them was standing on top of the crates, until that person could reach a tiramisu hanging six meters above the ground to receive two espressos, a tiramisu and their next clue.
- At the Sant'Agnese in Agone Church, teams had to find a clue outside of the church, which instructed them to look for people using Italian fashion brands and then take a selfie with the brand's logo. Once teams had taken five pictures, they could exchange them with a model named Naomi for their next clue.
- At the Pizzeria Disco Volante, teams were shown how to prepare a pizza margherita. Then, teams had to pick one of several pizza dough balls, and if the dough wasn't dyed inside, teams would have to prepare a pizza using pomodoro, mozzarella and fresh basil. If the dough had red dye inside, teams had to show it to the cook, who would direct them to Piazza Regina Margherita, where they would find an impersonator of Margherita of Savoy, who would hand them their next clue in exchange for the team's prepared pizzas.
- At the Colosseum, teams had to correctly move one of the large matches in order to fix the equation written in Roman numerals. The original equation was "VI – IV = IX" and they had to come up with the equation "VI + IV = X", so they had to change the sign using the "I" in the original result. Once teams came up with the correct solution, they could run to the Pit Stop.

=== Leg 3 (Italy) ===
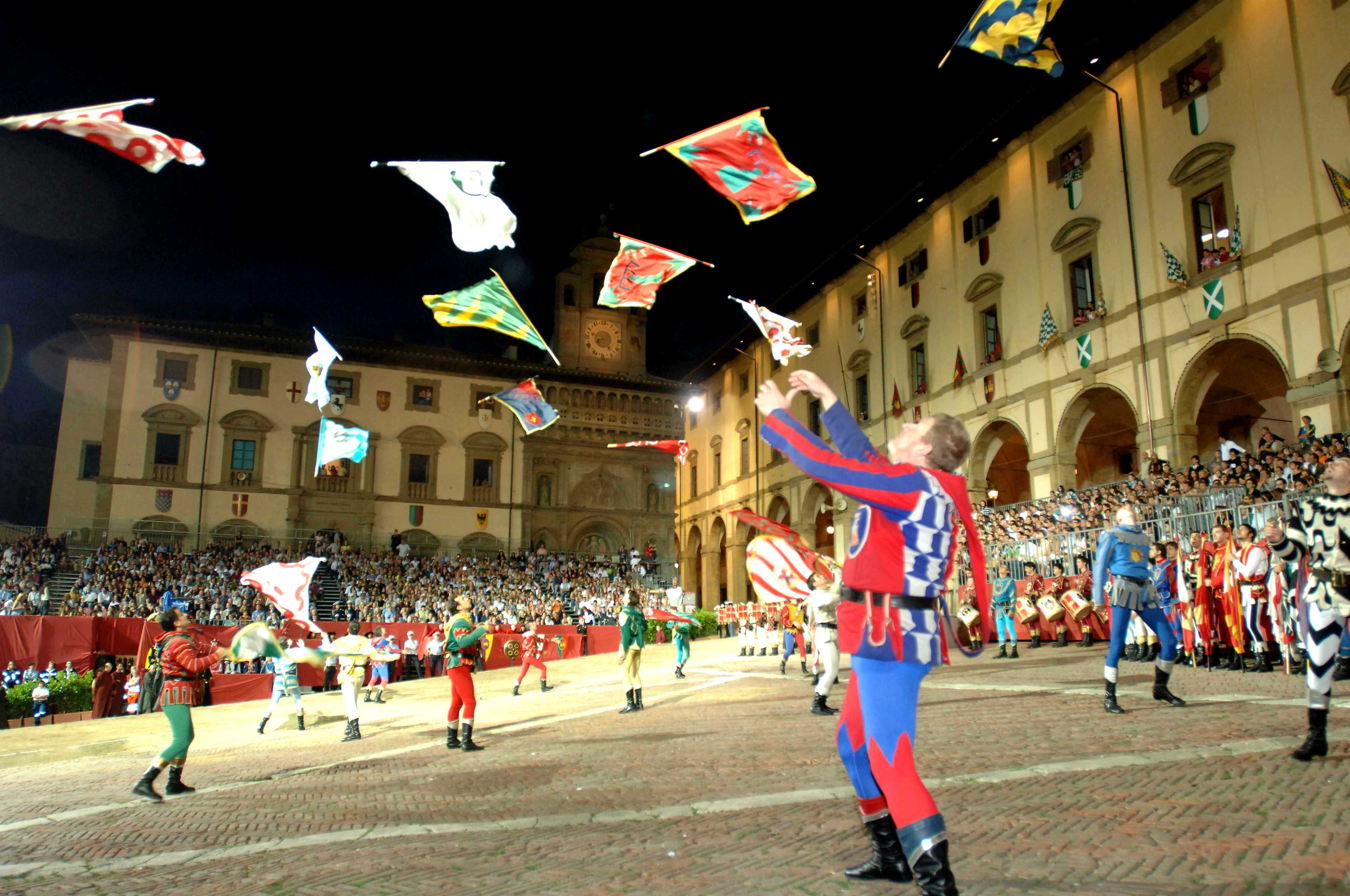
In the town of Sutri teams participated in the medieval tradition of flag throwing.

Airdates: 5, 7 & 14 June 2016

- Viterbo (Circuito Internazionale di Viterbo (in Italian))
- Sutri (Piazza del Comune)
- Sutri (Roman Amphitheatre of Sutri)
- Sutri (Alleys of Sutri)
- Campagnano di Roma (Giuseppe's Olive Plantation)
- Rome (Piazza Navona)
- Rome (Pincian Hill – Pincio Park) (Overnight Rest)
- Rome (Santa Maria in Trastevere)
- Rome (Transmission Music Store)
- Rome (Pincian Hill – Terrazza del Pincio)

For this season's first Duel, one team member from each team had to wear a Roman gladiator costume which left him blindfolded. Then, the two gladiators from different teams would have to face off inside of a large circle at the Roman Amphitheatre of Sutri with the objective of catching the other one with a net. To do so, the non-blindfolded team member would have to direct their partner when and where to throw the net. If one of the gladiators walked outside the marked circle, the point would go to the other team. Once a team had won two battles, they would receive their next clue. The team that lost the final Duel had to wait out a 15-minute penalty. After completing the Duel, teams would have to vote for the team they wanted to Yield.

In this season's first Roadblock, one team member had to recite sonnets in Italian and give different gifts (chocolates, roses, rings, etc.) to ten locals, who would have to give a cheek kiss to the racer, at Santa Maria in Trastevere. Once racers received ten kisses from ten different people, a Giacomo Casanova impersonator would hand them their next clue.

Additional tasks

- At the Circuito internazionale di Viterbo, both team members had to don overalls, and one of them had to drive in a kart for two laps around the circuit. After completing one lap, the other team member would have to change one of the kart tires before the driving team member could complete the other lap. If teams completed both laps in under 13 minutes, they would receive their next clue, otherwise they would have to try again.
- At Piazza del Comune, teams had to learn and perform a flag throwing choreography to the satisfaction of the lead flagman to receive their next clue.
- At the alleys of Sutri, teams had to take two baskets with fresh laundry and hang it from two different balconies that faced each other, one belonging to the Capulet family and the other belonging to the Montague family (named after the families from Romeo and Juliet). Clothes sized S and M belonged to the Capulet house and sizes L and XL belonged to the Montague house, so if one team member had the clothes belonging to the other house they would have to throw it to the other balcony. Once teams found the only piece of clothing sized XXXL, they could exchange it with the Mamma for their next clue.
- At Giuseppe's Olive Plantation, teams had to transport 5 kilograms of olive from one bucket at the bottom of a hill to the one in the top of the hill using their hands with olives while walking barefoot over an oily plastic carpet to receive their next clue from Giuseppe.
- At Piazza Navona, teams had to play the role of a paparazzi by finding an Israeli celebrity hiding anywhere in the Piazza and taking multiple pictures of him. Teams had to figure out that the celebrity was in fact HaMerotz LaMillion 4 contestant Tom Baum (from Tom & Uriel), who was drinking a coffee in one of the Piazza's cafés. Teams then had to show the pictures to Tom, who would give them the next clue.
- At Pincio Park on Pincian Hill, teams would discover if they were Yielded before signing up on a board in the order they arrived at the park. The next morning, teams had to return to the park and properly arrange the planets in the Solar System from closest to farthest to the Sun (Mercury, Venus, Earth, Mars, Jupiter, Saturn, Uranus, Neptune and Pluto). Once teams thought that their order was correct, they had to call a Galileo Galilei impersonator, who would hand them their next clue. If the order was incorrect, teams would have to pick a paper containing one of two penalty tasks, that they would have to complete before trying again. The first penalty task consisted of one team member moving two buckets with water for thirty seconds without stopping, one to the front and one to the back, in order to create centrifugal force. The other task consisted of one team member holding a Sun model, and the other one holding an Earth model. The person holding the Earth model would have to run around the person with the Sun model for six minutes and five seconds simulating the Earth's orbit.
- At the Transmission Music Store, teams would have to find the only gramophone record belonging to an Italian singer in the whole store, Toto Cutugno's "L'Italiano", which they could exchange with the store manager for their next clue.

Additional note

- At the Pit Stop in Terrazza del Pincio, the Yielded teams had to wait their 15-minute penalty before being allowed to check-in.

=== Leg 4 (Italy → Romania) ===
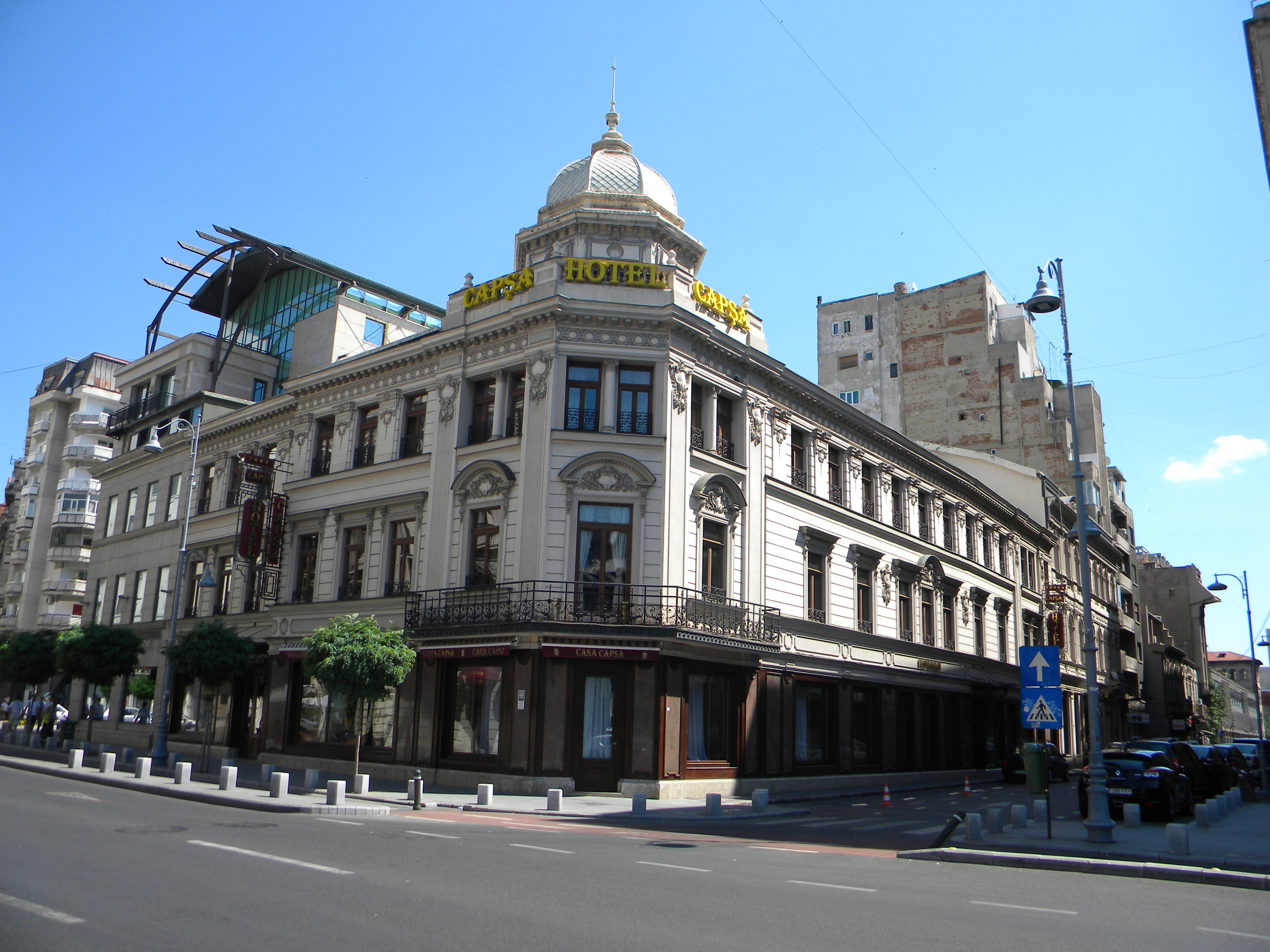
At Casa Capșa in Bucharest, teams encountered a Duel that involved authentic Romanian dishes.

Airdates: 20, 27 & 28 June 2016

- Rome (Leonardo da Vinci–Fiumicino Airport) to Bucharest, Romania (Henri Coandă International Airport)
- Bucharest (Stadionul Dinamo)
- Bucharest (University of Bucharest)
- Bucharest (Casa Capșa)
- Bucharest (Lipscani)
- Bușteni (Cantacuzino Castle)
- Bucharest (Artmark Galerie) (Overnight Rest)
- Bucharest (Artizanat București)
- Bucharest (Artmark Galerie)
- Bucharest (Bucharest North Railway Station) to Brașov (Brașov Railway Station)
- Brașov (Brașov Olympic Ice Rink)
- Brașov (Piața Sfatului)
- Brașov (Brașov Citadel (in Romanian))

This leg's Detour was a choice between התעמלות אומנותית (Gymnastics) or אתלטיקה קלה (Athletics). In Gymnastics, both team members had to learn a gymnastics routine using one hula hoop each. Then, they had to perform the routine in front of three judges and earn a score of seven or higher from all three judges to receive their next clue. In Athletics, one team member had to complete a hurdling course without touching any of the hurdles, and team member had to jump 1.20 metres (3.9 ft) on a high jump structure to receive their next clue.

In this leg's Roadblock, one team member had to attach magnets onto different parts of their body and search for the piece of metal that was not magnetized, which was an object made of gold that teams could exchange for the next clue.

For this leg's Duel, one member of each team had to bet on how many pieces of Romanian food (which included Mămăligă, Papanași and Mititei) they wanted their partner to eat. The last team member to say a number would make their partner eat that amount of food in five minutes. A team earned a point in any of two cases, first, if the team member eating ate all the food within the given time, or if the person eating was from the other team and couldn't eat the food in the time. The first team to reach two points would receive their next clue and win the battle. The team that lost the final Duel had to wait out a 15-minute penalty.

Additional tasks

- At Lipscani street, teams had to convince a local to take part as a guest in a talk show hosted by one of the racers with the other racer also as a guest. While the host asked personal questions to the local, the other racer would have to convince the local to let them rub a lemon on their elbows, apply avocado onto their skin, and put a bra on their head. If the local accepted all these activities, teams would receive their next clue.
- At Cantacuzino Castle, teams were welcomed by a Dracula impersonator, who guided them to a room without light and filled with scary stuff like spider webs, a coffin, a stuffed fox, etc. Teams had to search inside the room within 10 minutes for their clue, which was hanging from the ceiling. If teams ran out of time, they would have to wait for their next turn and try again.
- At Artmark Galerie in Bucharest, teams found out if they were Yielded and would sign up for a departure time next morning. The next day, teams had to go to Artizanat București and search in the store's showcases for something distinctive, which was the image of a specific castle. Then, they had to return to the Artmark Galerie and search among plenty of wax sealed letters for the one with a seal that depicted the same castle that they saw in the showcases.
- At the Brașov Olympic Ice Rink, teams had to ice skate inside the rink and match five different couples. On one side of the rink were the guys holding a pot inside a purse, while on the other side were the girls holding the pot's cover also inside a purse. To make a couple match, each team member had to take a person of opposite sex and match both the pot and the cover. Once teams matched all five couples, they would receive their next clue.
- At Piața Sfatului, teams had to watch a traditional Romanian group dance. At one point in the routine, the female dancers would uncover letters attached to their heads that formed the Pit Stop's location: "Brașov Citadel". Before checking in, the Yielded teams would have to wait their 15-minutes penalty.

=== Leg 5 (Romania → Namibia) ===
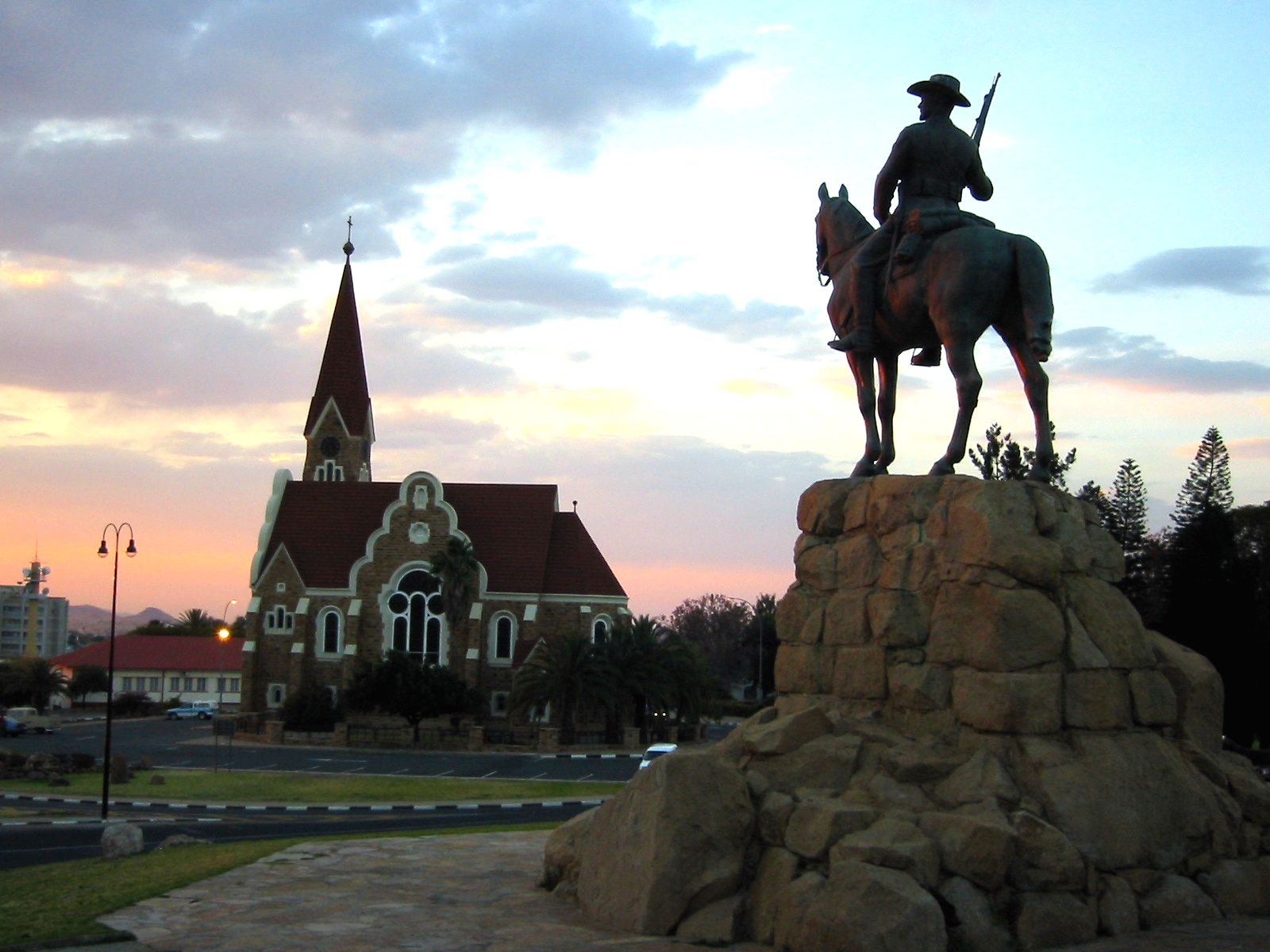
Christ Church, Windhoek was the site of the fifth Pit Stop.

Airdates: 4 & 5 July 2016

- Bucharest (Rin Grand Hotel) (Pit Start)
- Bucharest (Henri Coandă International Airport) to Windhoek, Namibia (Hosea Kutako International Airport)
- Khomas Region (Okapuka Ranch)
- Windhoek (Angola Street – Tyre Shop)
- Windhoek (Angola Street – Uukwandongo Nampadhi Shoe Repairs)
- Windhoek (Town Square near Clock Tower)
- Windhoek (Windhoek Public Library)
- Windhoek (Christ Church)

Additional tasks

- At Okapuka Ranch, teams had to vote for the team they wanted to Yield. Then, teams had to learn how to be tour guides on a safari. To do so, teams had to learn facts about different animals that could be seen on the safari. Every time teams spotted an animal, they had to correctly say the facts to the tourists. Once teams had properly described three animals, the ranger would hand them their next clue.
- In the next task at Okapuka Ranch, both team members had to don a giraffe costume, which included a large head, stilts as back legs and crutches as front legs. Then, teams had to hang five baskets on top of a wooden structure using the tongue attached to their costume's head to receive their next clue.
- The next clue instructed the teams to properly set up a campsite, including a shower, following the example campsite. Once the ranger was satisfied with the team's work, they would receive their next clue. Before leaving the Okapuka Ranch, teams would find out if they were Yielded.
- At the tyre shop on Angola Street, teams had to move five car tires from the tyre shop to a shoe repairs store. Each team member had to keep both legs inside two different tires at all times, with only one free tire that could be moved. Once teams reached the Uukwandongo Nampadhi Shoe Repairs store with the five tires, they would receive their next clue from the shoemaker.
- At the Town Square, teams had to convince eight locals to jump rope with them. They would start with one person jumping the rope, then would add another person without stopping the rope until there were eight people jumping simultaneously for at least three cycles to receive their next clue. If teams had to stop the rope, they would have to start again.
- At the Windhoek Public Library, teams had to correctly place labels of African countries on a big map, with only the countries' capitals written on it. Teams could ask locals for help or do it entirely by themselves. If teams received the approval from a teacher, they could make their way to the next Pit Stop: Christ Church. Before checking in, the Yielded teams had to wait out a 15-minute penalty.

=== Leg 6 (Namibia) ===
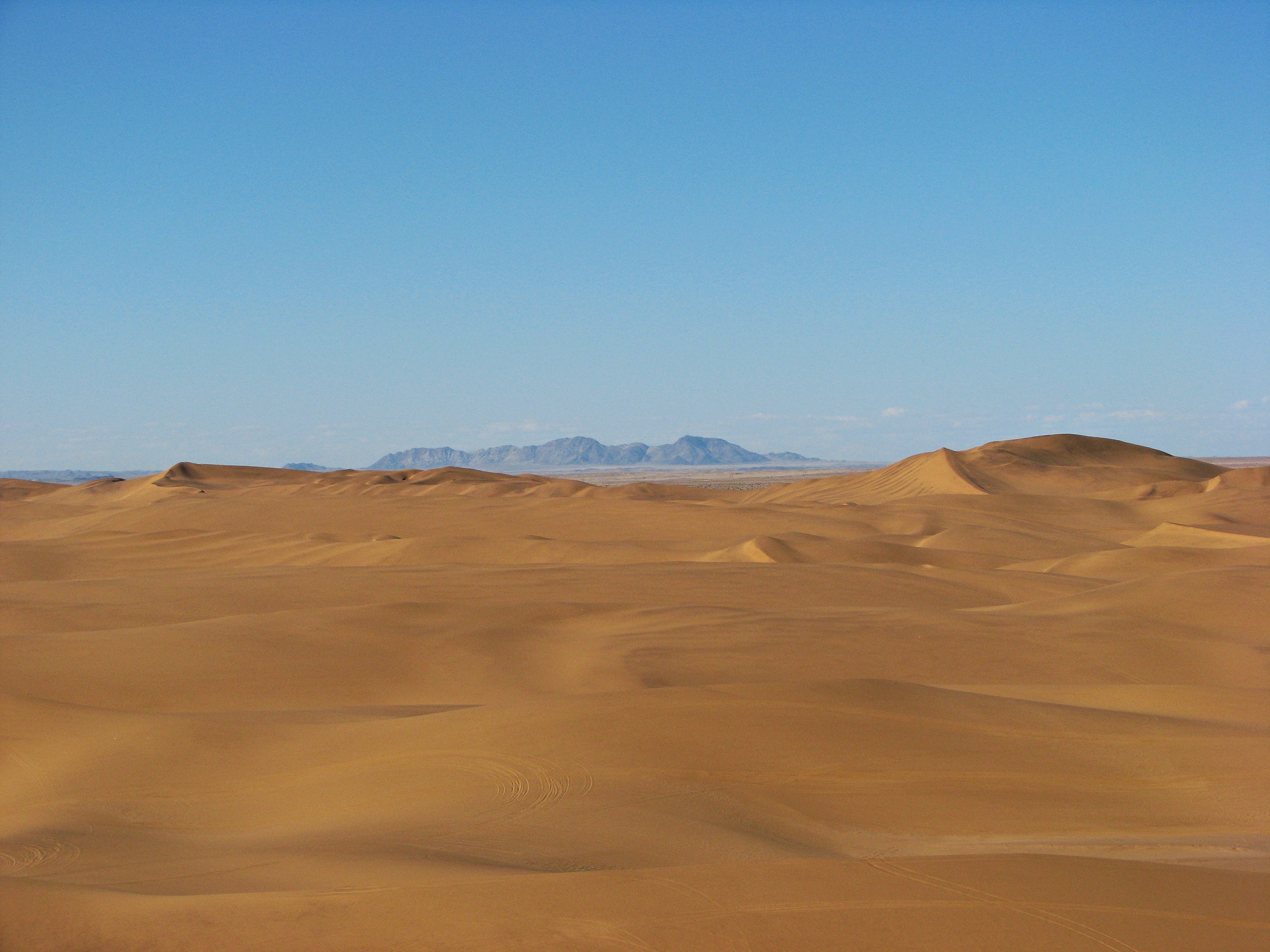
Namibia's lush desert landscape was the site of this leg's Roadblock.

Airdates: 11, 12 & 17 July 2016

- Erongo Region (Moon Valley – Damara Tribe Village)
- Swakopmund (Swakopmund Salt Company)
- Swakopmund (Namib High School)
- Erongo Region (Dorob National Park – Matterhorn Sand Dune (Dune # 7))
- Erongo Region (Dorob National Park)
- Swakopmund (Palm Beach)
- Swakopmund (Swakopmund Hotel)

For this leg's Duel, teams had to play a giant game of cardboard Jenga at Namib High School. The team who knocked over the tower in each match lost, and their opponents would win the next clue. The team that lost the final Duel had to wait out a 15-minute penalty.

In this leg's Roadblock, one team member had to ride a zorb down the slope of the dune, aiming for a 10-piece set of giant bowling pins. Team members could look into a pouch on the bottom of any pins they knocked over. Only one of the pins had their next clue, but it would be placed in a random pin every time the pins were set up. After they found the clue, their partner would ride a sandboard down the dune to meet up with them.

Additional tasks

- At the Damara Tribe Village, teams would first have to participate in an initiation ritual so they could join the tribe. They had to dress in traditional clothing and perform a welcome dance. They then had to drink a foul-tasting concoction presented by the village leader to receive their next clue.
- At the Damara Tribe Village's reservoir, teams had to fill up a bucket with water and use two crossed poles, one held by each team member, to carry the bucket 1.5 km (0.93 mi) through the desert without dropping it. If they hadn't spilled too much water, teams would receive their next clue. Teams would then have to use wood, grass and elephant dung to light a fire using the tribe's methods to receive their next clue. Finally, teams made their way to the tribe's food storage area, where they would find 18 holes in the ground used by the tribe to store and cool food. There, teams had to complete a memory game, with each team member reaching into a hole and pulling up whatever disgusting object was inside. Teams had to try and make a match and had to try again if they did not make a match. After teams successfully made nine matches, they would receive their next clue. Once they had completed these challenges, they had to vote for the team that they wanted to Yield.
- At the Swakopmund Salt Company, teams had to enter the pink-colored artificial lake, where they would dig up salt crystals from the lake bed. Once they had harvested 25 kg (55 lb) of salt, they would then add this to a cart that already had salt, bringing the total to 50 kg (110 lb), and had to push this cart along a 1 km (0.62 mi) route. After delivering the salt, teams would receive their next clue, which instructed them to search through a gigantic mountain of salt for their next clue.
- After completing the Duel, teams traveled to the intersection of Hendrik Witbooi & Woermann to find out if they were Yielded.
- After completing the Roadblock, teams then had to drive dune buggies to a set of 'chill tents', where they would take a mandatory break from racing, during which they could enjoy some fruit and juice, before they would receive their next clue. Teams would then have to find an oasis, a wading pool set up next to a lone tree. Teams would find five ropes, only one of which would lead up a very steep dune to the oasis and their next clue. Teams had to follow the ropes, trying each one until they found the correct rope.
- At Palm Beach, teams would find a slingshot set up with five targets. Each target had a picture of a different Swakopmund landmark: the Swakopmund Lighthouse, the Swakopmund Hotel, the Palm Beach Jetty, the National Marine Aquarium, and the Woermann Tower. Teams had to hit the target of the location they thought the Pit Stop was, after which they would travel to this location to see if the Pit Stop was actually there. The Pit Stop was at the Swakopmund Hotel. Before checking in, the Yielded teams would have to wait their 15-minutes penalty.

=== Leg 7 (Namibia → Tanzania) ===
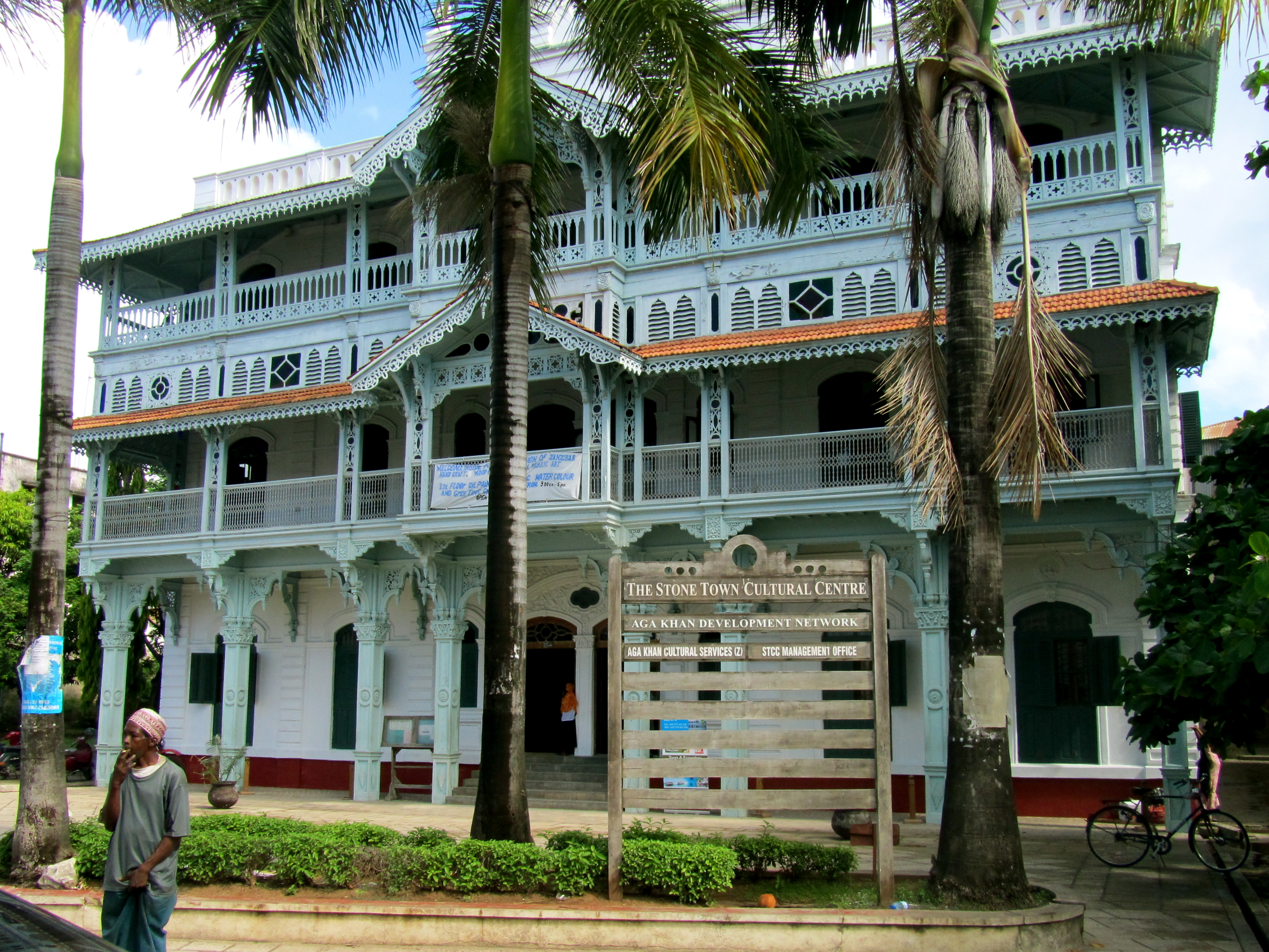
In the historical section of Zanzibar's Stone Town, teams visited the Old Dispensary complex.

Airdates: 19, 24 & 26 July 2016

- Walvis Bay (Walvis Bay Airport) to Zanzibar City, Zanzibar, Tanzania (Abeid Amani Karume International Airport)
- Zanzibar City (Seaweed Centre)
- Michamvi Kae (Sunset Bay Resort)
- Pingwe (Kichanga Lodge)
- Zanzibar City (Stone Town – British School of Zanzibar)
- Zanzibar City (Stone Town – Old Dispensary)
- Zanzibar City (Stone Town – Darajani Market)
- Zanzibar City (Stone Town – Freddie Mercury House)
- Zanzibar City (Stone Town – Stone Town Hotel)
- Kiembe Samaki (Protea Pier)
- Nungwi (Baraka Natural Aquarium)
- Nungwi (Essque Zalu Pier)

This leg's Detour was a choice between ברמן (Barmen) or מלצר (Waiter). In Barmen, teams would have to figure out how to pour liquid into seven stacked glasses at once, four in yellow on the bottom and three in red on the top, to receive their next clue. In Waiter, one team member had to pick up a serving tray filled with fruit and glasses of tropical drinks. They would then stand on the end of a paddleboard while their partner paddled them out to a boat. If they could deliver the food and drink without spilling anything, teams would receive their next clue.

Additional tasks

- At the Seaweed Centre, teams had to wade into the water and harvest seaweed from a seaweed farm. They would have to pull the plants off of 25 lines, making sure to replace the posts in exactly the same positions. Once all of the seaweed was harvested and hauled to shore, teams would receive their next clue. They then had to head to a nearby café, where they voted for which team they would like to U-Turn.
- At the Kichanga Lodge, teams would have their picture taken by a professional photographer on the beach. They had to follow the photographer's instructions to create many stunning and vibrant pictures. Towards the end of the session, teams would be surprised by the addition of a live snake, which would be draped over their body. They had to remain still and smile for a few more pictures with the snake to receive their next clue.
- At the British School of Zanzibar, teams had to learn how to perform a dance and then film a music video to Shakira's "Waka Waka (This Time for Africa)" to the satisfaction of the choreographer to receive their next clue.
- At the Old Dispensary, teams would be given a sample of a spice mix called 'al-Merotz'. One team member would smell the mixture, while their partner would taste samples of 20 available ingredients. Teams then had to recreate the spice by using the same eight ingredients to get their next clue.
- At the Darajani Market, teams had to find a marked stand, where they would find 80 newspaper cones filled with nuts and beans. Teams had to open the cones and then eat whatever was inside, while looking for their next clue hidden on one of the newspapers and featured a photograph of Ron Shahar. The clue asked them in Arabic, "اين موجود فريدي؟" (Where is Freddy?), directing them to the Freddie Mercury House.
- At the Stone Town Hotel, teams had to search through a hotel room for their next clue, which was hidden inside a roll of toilet paper and underneath a box of tissues.
- At the Protea Pier, teams had to walk out to the end of a log jutting out over the water and retrieve four flags from the end to receive their next clue. There was only one log available, so teams would have to form a queue.
- At the Baraka National Aquarium, teams had to enter a pool full of turtles and search the murky water for a small turtle figurine, which had the location of the Pit Stop written on the bottom.

=== Leg 8 (Tanzania → India) ===
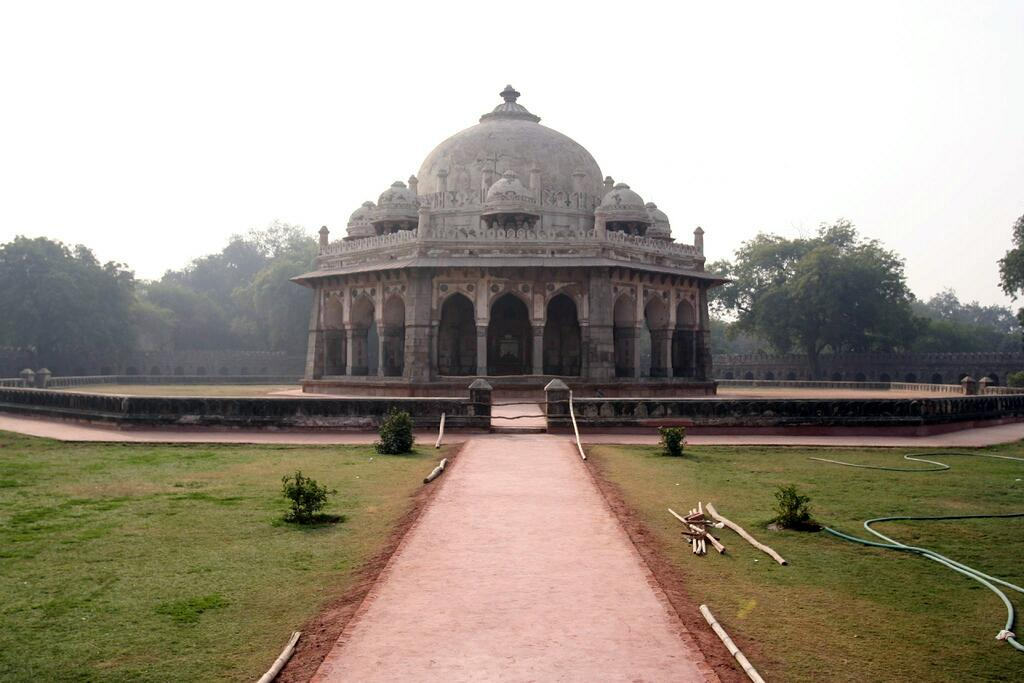
The leg ended at the tomb of Isa Khan within the Humayun's Tomb Complex in Delhi.

Airdates: 31 July, 2 & 7 August 2016

- Zanzibar City (Abeid Amani Karume International Airport) to Delhi, India (Indira Gandhi International Airport)
- Delhi (Ghazipur Fish Market)
- Delhi (Agrasen Ki Baoli)
- Delhi (Paharganj Main Bazaar Market)
- Delhi (Kikar Nero Place)
- Delhi (Cafe 21 Bakery)
- Delhi (Shuba Lagam Wedding Hall)
- Delhi (Dimple Farm)
- Delhi (Institute For Driving and Traffic)
- Delhi (Madame Chang Fabric)
- Delhi (Humayun's Tomb – Isa Khan's Tomb)

This leg's Detour was a choice between אכיל (Edible) or שביר (Fragile). In Edible, teams had to find a specific food vendor service, where they would pick up a rickshaw filled with tins of food. They had to move it through the crowded market to the Heena Beauty Parlor to receive their next clue. In Fragile, teams had to load clay pots onto a cart and then transport them through the crowded market. If they could deliver at least 25 unbroken pots, teams would receive their next clue.

Additional tasks

- At the Ghazipur Fish Market, each team member had to load five live catfish into a basket, then carry the basket on their head across the crowded market. Once 20 fish were delivered to a waiting vendor, teams would receive their next clue. After this task, they voted for which team they would like to U-Turn.
- At Agrasen Ki Baoli, teams had to look under the turbans of the men walking in the step well for one with a tiny Amazing Race flag attached to the inside, which could be exchanged for their next clue. If they didn't find a flag, they would have to spend at least 10 minutes rewrapping the man's turban.
- At Kikar Nero Place, one team member had to wear a sandwich board shaped like a giant pita bread. Their partner had to stand behind a designated line and use a device to squirt amba sauce at them. The one in the sandwich board had to try and catch the sauce in the receptacle located inside. Once the receptacle was full, teams would receive their next clue.
- At Cafe 21 Bakery, teams received an invitation to a wedding and had to pick up a 30 kg (66 lb) wedding cake and carry it by hand to Shuba Lagam Wedding Hall, where the wedding was taking place. At the wedding, they would take part in an Indian wedding tradition where the team members would be tied together by their hands. They then had to look through a huge pile of wedding presents for one with their next clue inside. Some of the presents had cards inside with extra tasks the teams needed to perform before they continued searching. This included singing the bride a Hebrew bridal song, feeding each other an entire 'level' of wedding cake, dancing with the grandmothers, dancing with 10 guests in a conga line, and toasting the bride and groom.
- At Dimple Farm, teams would be shown nine advanced yoga poses. Team members would have to perform three of the poses and hold each pose for at least 10 seconds to receive their next clue.
- At the Institute for Driving and Traffic Research, both team members had to pass a rickshaw driving exam to receive their next clue.
- At Madame Chang Fabric, one team member had to observe a board containing a series of colored handprints. They would then pick up two balloons and run through a crowd, who would pelt them with colored dyes like in the Holi Festival. Once they reached their partner, they would break the balloons on them to see what color paint was inside. If it was a color they needed, they would instruct their partner to make a handprint in the correct spot on the diagram with that color. If teams made a mistake, they had to start over from the beginning. Once the diagram was properly recreated, teams would receive their next clue.
- At Isa Khan's Tomb, teams would pay tribute to Slumdog Millionaire by playing a simplified version of Who Wants to be a Millionaire?. Teams would be provided with two lifelines and had to answer three multiple choice questions. However, these lifelines had to be set up ahead of time. In order to use 50/50, teams needed to obtain two 50 rupee bills from a local (not a 100 rupee bill). Teams would give these bills to the host in order to use the lifeline. In order to use Phone a Friend, teams needed to find a local willing to let them use their phone to call long-distance to Israel. Teams would then call a designated number, connected to a phone sitting in the middle of a walkway in Israel. Any random Israel local could pick up the phone and help the team with their question. Teams were asked the population of India, which of four board games was invented in India, and a time zone question involving the time in Israel and New Delhi. If any question was answered incorrectly, teams would have to serve a 15-minute penalty. After the three questions had been answered, teams were directed to the Pit Stop at Humayun's Tomb.

=== Leg 9 (India → South Korea) ===
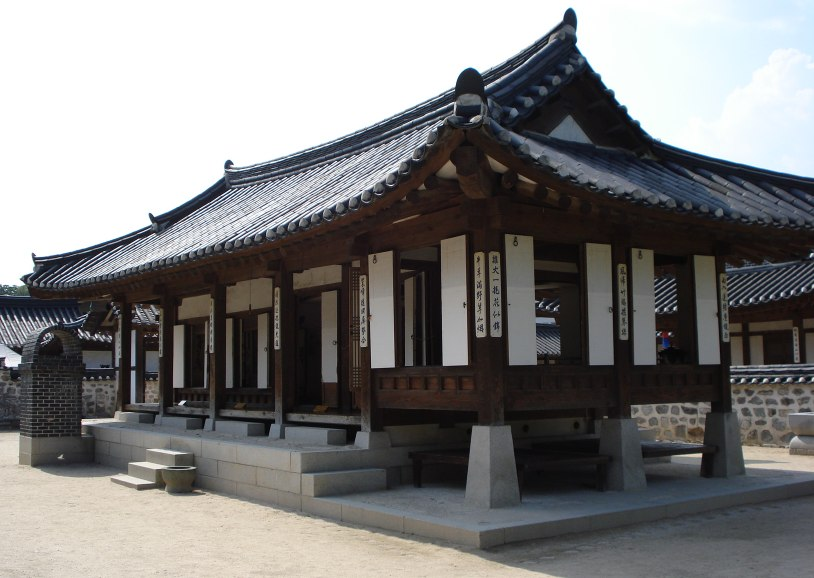
While in Seoul, teams visited Namsangol Hanok Village, known for the famed traditional Korean houses.

Airdates: 9, 14, 16 & 21 August 2016

- Delhi (Holiday Inn) (Pit Start)
- Delhi (Indira Gandhi International Airport) to Seoul, South Korea (Incheon International Airport)
- Gwacheon (Seoul Land)
- Seoul (Noryangjin Fisheries Wholesale Market)
- Seoul (Yangcheon Haenuri Sports Park)
- Seoul (Kolon Sporex)
- Seoul (Namsangol Hanok Village)
- Seoul (Gyeongbokgung – Gwanghwamun Gate)
- Seoul (Luxury Karaoke)
- Seoul (Seocho District – Samsung D'light)
- Seoul (Su Noraebang)
- Seoul (Sogang University)
- Seoul (Changcheon-dong)
- Seoul (Olympic Park)

For this leg's Duel, one team member had to dress a mouse and the team member from the opposing team dressed as a cat. Their respective partners had to guide them through a maze to achieve their objectives – for the Mouse team, they had to find the block of cheese and for the Cat team, they had to find the mouse. Whichever team achieved their objective first won the point. The first team to win two matches received their next clue, while the losers had to wait for the next team to arrive. The team that lost the final Duel had to wait out a 15-minute penalty.

Additional tasks

- At Seoul Land, teams had to ride a rollercoaster and look for a complex mathematical equation that was being held up on a sign as they rode the ride. If they solved it by the end of the ride, they would receive their next clue. Otherwise, they had to ride the rollercoaster again.
- At Noryangjin Fisheries Wholesale Market, there were six boxes with live seafood in them, each with a number written on them. Teams had to transport their given number of seafood items across the market to a vendor to receive their next clue. There was a 30-minute time limit to transport their items.
- At Kolon Sporex, teams had to take part in a Korean game show, in which one team member was wrapped in bubble wrap and their partner had to paddle them like a boat to move eleven floating puzzle pieces so that they would form the flag of South Korea and receive their next clue.
- At Namsangol Hanok Village, teams had to find the one piece of plastic food that was hidden on a buffet of Korean delicacies to receive their next clue. Anything teams picked up had to be eaten.
- At the Gwanghwamun Gate, teams had to find the five cards written in Korean characters from the ninety that were written in Chinese and Japanese. Then, they had to ask locals to help them work out what the five characters spelt – their next destination. They can only take five cards with them at a time.
- At Luxury Karaoke, teams take part in the bamboo game called tuho. They were given twenty bamboo sticks and had to successfully throw five of them into a narrow pot. If they landed five in the pot, they received their next clue. If not, they had to spend 10 minutes singing karaoke, before attempting the task again. After teams finished this task, they had to vote for which team they wished to Yield.
- At Samsung D'light, teams had to search the ground floor for a message on a screen from the host, who directed them to the second floor of the store. There, they were surprised with a video chat with loved ones from home before receiving their next clue.
- At Su Noraebang, teams had to find "K-Food Express", where they would pick up a cart and load it with a serving of Israeli food. Their first serving contained pita with hummus, a falafel, and a spicy egg. Teams had to convince a single Korean local to eat all of this food, otherwise they would have to go back and get a new dish. Then, teams would have to find a local to eat a single serving of gefilte fish to receive their next clue.
- At Sogang University, one team member were given a listing of six electronic cables that were required to hook up a home theatre system, while their partner had to find them in a huge tangle of wires. The team member looking at the sign had to stand behind a line and could not physically help, while the one untangling the wires could not see the sign. Once the six wires were retrieved and used to properly hook up the home theatre system, it would turn on and display the team's next destination. Here, teams would discover if they received the Yield.
- At Changcheon-Dong, teams would observe a photograph of Miss Korea 2015 Lee Min-ji and had to search the nearby streets for her. Once they thought they had found her, they had to hand her a tiara and sash and say a Korean phrase meaning "You are very beautiful". If they had found the real Miss Korea, teams would receive their next clue, directing them to the Pit Stop at Olympic Park. There, Joezi & Alex had to serve their Yield penalty before checking-in at the mat.

=== Leg 10 (South Korea → Vietnam) ===
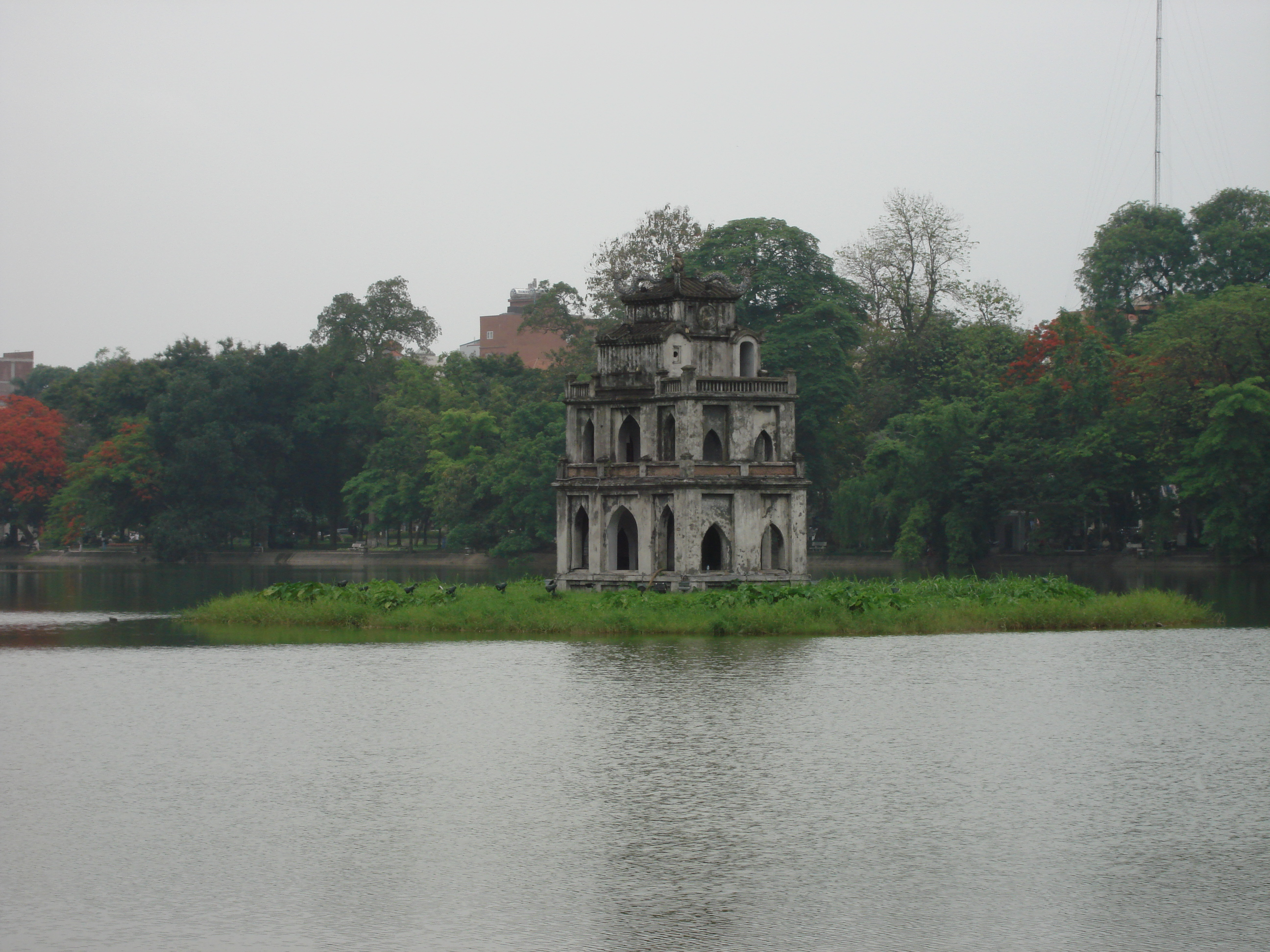
The view of Turtle Tower around Hoàn Kiếm Lake in Hanoi was the setting of the Detour.

Airdates: 30 August, 4 & 6 September 2016

- Seoul (Millennium Hilton Seoul) (Pit Start)
- Seoul (Incheon International Airport) to Hanoi, Vietnam (Noi Bai International Airport)
- Hanoi (Hanoi Opera House)
- Hanoi (Hoàn Kiếm Lake)
- Hanoi (Trúc Bạch Lake)
- Hanoi (Hau Hoc Van)
- Hanoi (Temple of Literature)
- Hanoi (Lenin Park)
- Hanoi (Nghia Mai (in Vietnamese))
- Hanoi (Thu Le Park Zoo)
- Hanoi (Huong Lien Bun Cha Restaurant)
- Hanoi (Vietnam Museum of Ethnology)
- Hanoi (Imperial Citadel of Thăng Long)

This season's final Detour was a choice between איטי (Slow) or מהיר (Fast). In Slow, teams had to perform 30 minutes of tai chi to receive their next clue. In Fast, teams had to perform cardio aerobics to receive their next clue.

For this season's final Duel, one team member from each team had to balance themselves on a thin pole whilst trying to hit their opponent off of the pole with a pillow to score a point. The first team to score two points received their next clue, while the loser had to wait for the next team. The team that lost the final Duel had to wait out a 15-minute penalty.

Additional tasks

- At the Hanoi Opera House, teams had to stand on the roof and watch the busy roundabout underneath the building, looking for seven numbers on vehicles and people below. Once they had all seven, they had to head to a nearby motorcycle parking lot and find one of a few number plates with all seven numbers on it to receive their next clue. This lot was also where they had to vote for which team they wished to U-Turn.
- At Trúc Bạch Lake Marina, teams had to ride in a swan boat, where they took a mandatory break from the leg.
- At the Temple of Literature, teams would pick up a pair of shoulder harnesses with baskets and fill them with rice. They would then carry the rice along a marked path around the temple until they reached a set of scales, where they would weigh their rice. Once teams reached a total of 284 kg (626 lb) of rice – the amount that an average Vietnamese family consumes in a year – they would receive their next clue.
- At Lenin Park, teams would find a series of blocks on the ground. One team member would stand on the starting block, while their partner would retrieve bamboo ladders of varying lengths from a large pile. They could only lay down ladders if they fit perfectly between a pair of blocks. Teams needed to find a way to use their limited amount of ladders to cross all of the blocks to reach their next clue.
- At Nghia Mai, teams had to find a marked coal shop, where team would use local tools to make 30 coal bricks, a traditional Vietnamese fuel source, using wet coal. Once complete, they had to use tongs to pick up four bricks, two per team member, and carry them through the neighborhood without damaging them or putting them down. Once they delivered them to a marked vendor, she would use them to power her stoves and give the teams the next clue.
- At Thu Le Park Zoo, teams had to learn how to perform a traditional Chinese lion dance. During the dance, teams had to jump across a series of platforms while wearing the lion costume, taking care not to fall off. If successful, teams would receive their next clue.
- At Huong Lien Bun Cha Restaurant, teams had to eat the entire contents of a foul-smelling durian, freshly picked off of the tree, to receive their next clue.
- At the Vietnam Museum of Ethnology, one team member had to look through 1500 Vietnamese nón lá hats for one with a tiny Amazing Race flag on the underside to receive their next clue. For every hat they picked up, they would have to place it on the head of their partner, continuing to stack them up higher and higher. If the hats fell off of their head at any point, the team would have to serve a 10-minute penalty before continuing.

=== Leg 11 (Vietnam → Cambodia) ===
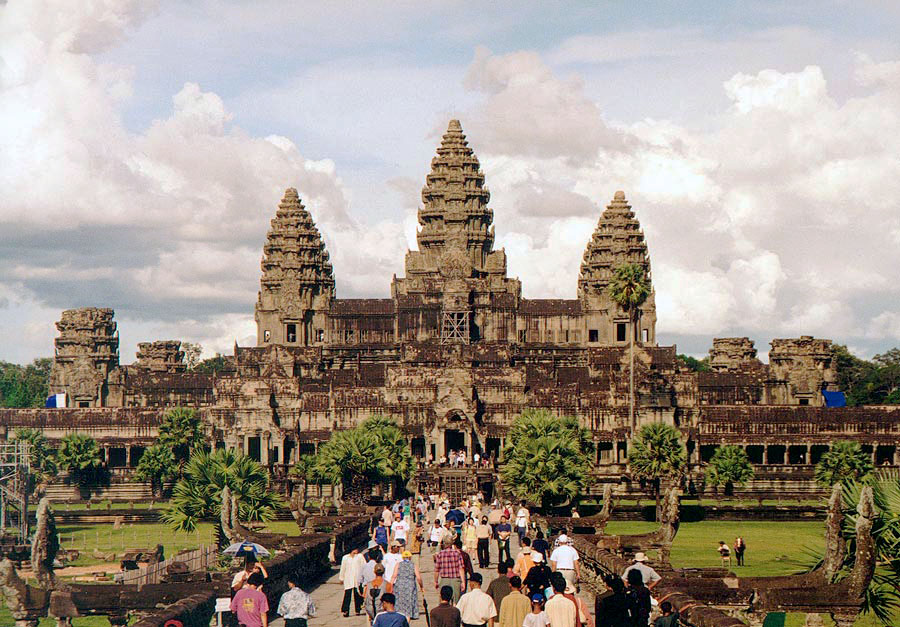
While in Cambodia, teams visited the world-famous Angkor Wat temple complex in Siem Reap.

Airdates: 11, 12 & 13 September 2016

- Hanoi (Noi Bai International Airport) to Siem Reap, Cambodia (Siem Reap International Airport)
- Siem Reap (Siem Reap Harbor) to Tonlé Sap (Dock)
- Tonlé Sap (School)
- Tonlé Sap (Kho Andeth)
- Tonlé Sap (Houseboat)
- Siem Reap (Wat Damnak to Wat Preah Prom Rath)
- Sokha (Sita's Farm)
- Sokha (Basket Selling Stall)
- Sokha (Rice Farm)
- Siem Reap (9th Street)
- Siem Reap (Angkor Wat)
- Siem Reap (Wat Tang Tok)
- Siem Reap (Baphuon Temple)

In this season's final Roadblock, one team member had to ride a bike laden with a very heavy load of fish traps along the main road until they reached a farm. There, they had to search through all of the fish traps for the one with a small Amazing Race flag attached to receive their next clue.

Additional tasks

- At the school, teams would spend time with the pupils for a short time before receiving their next clue.
- At Kho Andeth, teams had to follow a set of precise instructions to build their own bamboo raft. They would then use it to solve a real-life version of a classic brain teaser. Teams would be given one of two sets of figures. They would either have a lion, pig, tortoise and bananas, or they would have a tiger, rooster, parrot and corn. Teams had to transport the predator, the farm animal, and the food over to a nearby houseboat, but could only carry one item at a time. The predator could not be left alone with the farm animal or it would be eaten. Likewise, the farm animal could not be left alone with the food, or it would be eaten. The tortoise and parrot were not part of the puzzle, but teams were not told this. Once teams solved the puzzle, they would receive their next clue.
- On the houseboat, teams would spend a predetermined amount of time taking a break from racing, during which time they could eat tropical fruit and rest on hammocks, before receiving their next clue.
- At Wat Damnak, teams had to observe an intricate Buddha shrine, memorizing where all of the little pieces were located. They would then take it apart and load it onto a cyclo to take it to their next destination.
- At Wat Preah Prom Rath, teams had to assemble the Buddha shrine back together so that it matched the configuration that they saw at Wat Damnak to receive their next clue. Teams were free to return to Wat Danmak at any point to check the example. After receiving their clue, teams voted for who they would like to receive this leg's Yield.
- After the Roadblock, teams had to use a basket to catch fish in the farm's pond and then reach in through a hole in the top to pick them up with their bare hands. Once they caught five fish, teams would receive their next clue. Teams would then discover if they were Yielded.
- At Sita's Farm, teams had to herd 500 ducks along a marked field and bring them to a lake, where they would rest with the ducks for 10 minutes. They then had to herd all 500 of them back to their holding pen to receive their next clue.
- On 9th Street, teams had to set up a food stall and fill a pot with oil to prepare for deep frying. Teams would then cook with the ingredients they had been given. Unbeknownst to the teams, these ingredients were beetles, crickets, worms and spiders. One team member had to pick up the bugs with their bare hands and pass them to their team member, who would deep fry them. Once everything was cooked and prepared, teams had to sell the food they had just made. In total, teams would have to earn 20,000 riels. Any customer they sold food to would have to take a bite of the food to prove that they would not just throw away what they had bought. Once teams had earned enough money, they would receive their next clue.
- At Angkor Wat, teams would find five different offerings on the outskirts of the temple and had to choose one. They then had to climb a very steep set of stairs to reach one of three monks and present their offering. Each monk would only accept a single type of offering. If teams brought the wrong kind, the monk would say a Buddhist proverb to them in English, which would subtly hint at what they wanted. Once all three monks received their proper offerings, teams would receive their next clue.
- At Wat Tang Tok, teams had to pick one of 50 bowls of coins and then drop one coin into each of the 102 small cups set up near the Buddha statue. If teams chose a bowl with exactly 102 coins, they would receive their next clue. Otherwise, they would have to try again with a different bowl.

Additional note

- While in Tonlé Sap, teams travelled by rowboat.

=== Leg 12 (Cambodia → Australia) ===
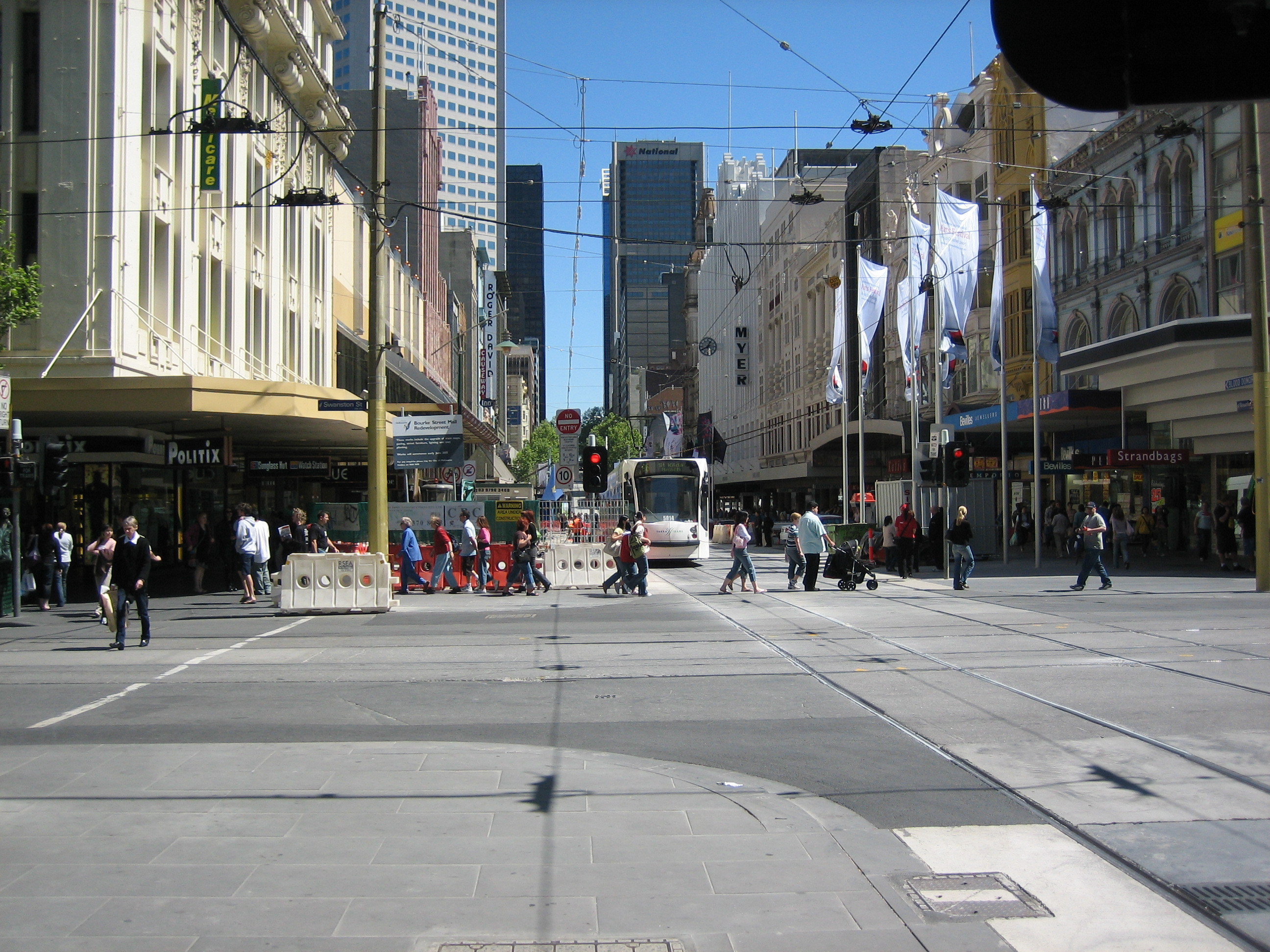
While in Melbourne, teams visited Bourke Street on the overlooking street mall.

Airdates: 18, 19 & 20 September 2016

- Siem Reap (Angkor Century Resort and Spa) (Pit Start)
- Siem Reap (Siem Reap International Airport) to Melbourne, Victoria, Australia (Melbourne Airport)
- Melbourne (Brighton Beach)
- Melbourne (Albert Park – Melbourne Sports & Aquatic Centre)
- Melbourne (Carlton – Royal Exhibition Building)
- Melbourne (Docklands Pier – City Marina)
- Melbourne (Carlton – Melbourne Museum)
- Melbourne (City Centre – Bourke Street)
- Melbourne (Southbank – National Gallery of Victoria)
- Melbourne (South Melbourne – Chez Dré)
- Geelong (South Geelong – Simonds Stadium)
- Geelong (Geelong Town Hall)

Additional tasks

- At Brighton Beach, teams had to search Melbourne's iconic colorful beach huts for the one which could be unlocked with a key included with the clue. Then, they had to look amongst many items on a beach each with a sticker corresponding to a hut. If the sticker matched the teams' hut, they would receive their next clue, otherwise teams had to carry the item to whichever hut was on the sticker before grabbing another item.
- At Melbourne Sports and Aquatic Centre, teams had to surf on a standing wave for 2 minutes and 50 seconds total. Each team member was required to surf for at least one minute. When the team's combined times reached the necessary length, they would their next clue.
- At the Royal Exhibition Building, one team member had to roll their partner, who was strapped inside a giant wheel, a distance of 300 metres (980 ft) around the courtyard within a five-minute limit. Once they successfully completed the course, they would get their next clue.
- At the Docklands City Marina, teams changed into a kangaroo costume with spring shoes and sorted through 20 photos of landmarks, foods, and celebrities. If teams correctly chose the 12 pictures that were Australian, the judge would give them their next clue.
- At Melbourne Museum, teams had to play a giant trivia board game, which was divided into the countries they visited during the season. Then, teams had to roll the dice to advance their token to a space where they would draw a card which contained a question and a penalty related to the leg from that space's country, with the exception of the Australia spaces which contained questions about previous seasons of HaMerotz LaMillion. If teams answered the question correctly they could roll the dice again; however, if their answer was wrong teams had to complete the penalty task before rolling again. Additionally, each country had a space where, if landed on, teams drew a card that would instruct them to move their token to a specific country. Once the teams reached the end of the board, a man dressed as Captain Cook would hand them their next clue.
- The next clue where teams instructed to find the neighbour Charlene Robinson at Bourke Street, which they had to figure out was a character in the soap opera Neighbours portrayed by Kylie Minogue. Then, they had to find a Kylie Minogue impersonator, who would sing "Especially for You" for them and give the teams a tablet with a special message from loved ones back at home. When finished, the impersonator would give teams their next clue.
- At the National Gallery of Victoria, one team member had to hang upside down in a harness and spray paint a picture using stencils. The team member on the ground had to pull ropes to move them in each direction. After painting with two stencils, team members would swap places for the last stencil. Once they done, the art director would hand them their next clue.
- At Chez Dré, one team member had to don a screen over their eyes that showed video from a camera that was on their partner's head. The team member with the screen had to prepare and decorate a Pavlova cake to the standards of a baker to receive their next clue.
- At Simonds Stadium, teams had to count the number of players running around the stadium's pitch. Then, they would use this number to find a seat with a clue envelope attached to the chair. If the number was correct, they would find their next clue. If the number was wrong, the envelope instructed teams to do exercises as a penalty before trying again.

=== Leg 13 (Australia) ===
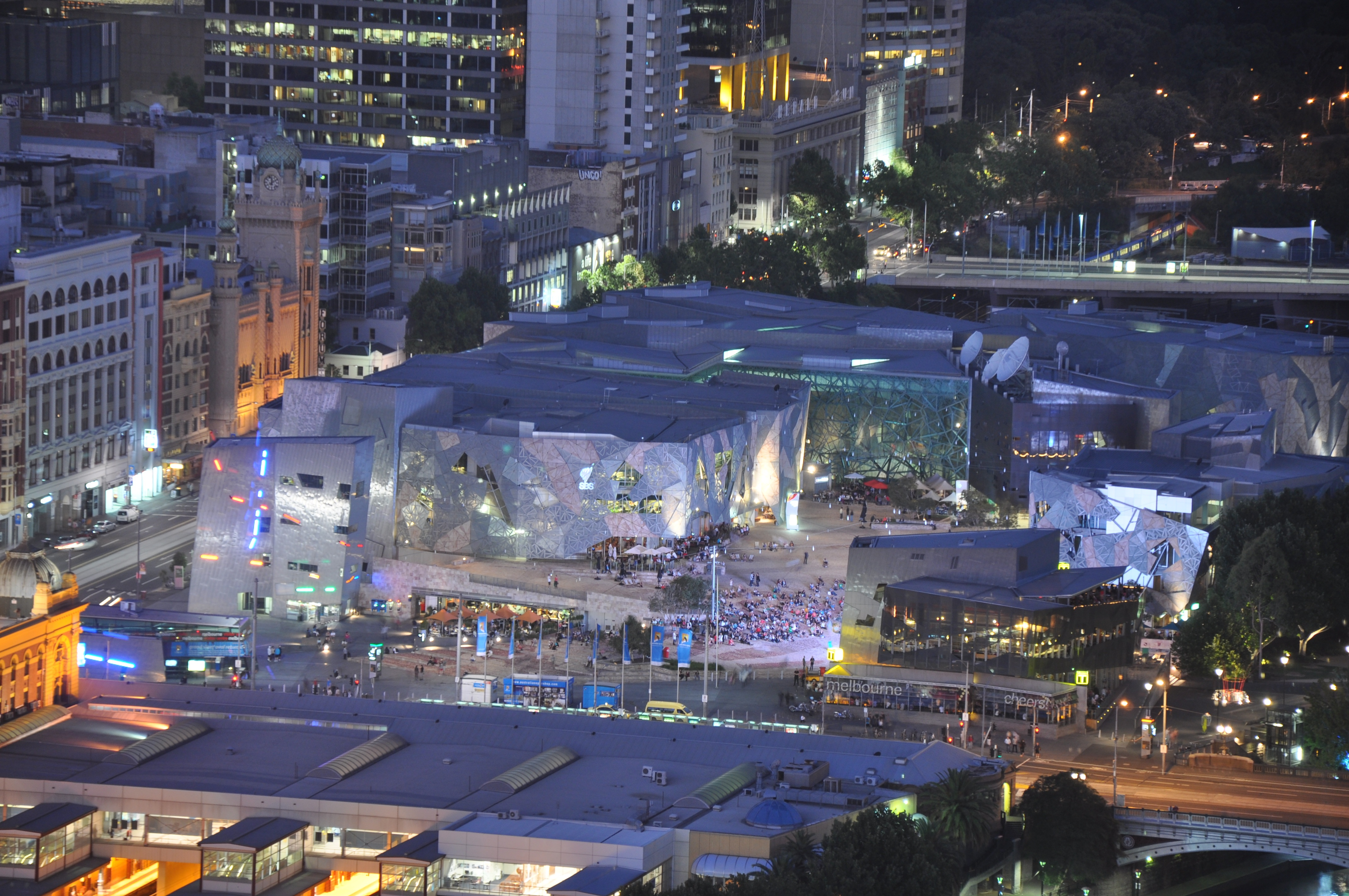
Teams visited the Federation Square overlooking the view of Melbourne city centre for the final leg of HaMerotz LaMillion.

Airdate: 26 September 2016

- Melbourne (Docklands Pier to St Kilda – St Kilda Beach)
- Melbourne (City Centre – Federation Square)
- Melbourne (Docklands – Melbourne Star)
- Healesville (Hedgend Maze)

Additional tasks

- At Docklands Pier, teams had to choose a yacht and sail towards their next destination at St Kilda Beach.
- At St Kilda Beach, teams had to pick a circle of flags, containing the names of the cities visited this season and the word for "hello" in the city's language. They would be attached by the waist with an elastic band with a globe hanging on a wire in between team member. They had to position themselves carefully, because if the globe moved out of the circle flags in the center, they would serve the one-minute penalty. Teams had match each city with the way to say 'hello' in the city's country. The correct answers were:

Language	Hello
Italian	Ciao
Romanian	Salut
Afrikaans	Hallo
Swahili	Jambo
Hindi	नमस्ते (Namaste)
Korean	안녕 (Annyeong)
Vietnamese	Xin Chào
Khmer	ជំរាបសួរ (Chum Reap Suor)
English	Hello

Once these words were correctly matched, teams would receive their next clue.

- At Federation Square, teams had to gather 50 people and give each them a shirt of a particular color. They would then proceed to the grounds and assemble a group to say the phrase, "!שם הקבוצה) היא הקבוצה הכי טובה בעולם) ((Team name) is the best team in the world!)". Once the crowd recited the phrase, teams would assemble a director, cameraman and sound technician to shoot a short video that would explain why they should win a million and would end with a crowd shouting the phrase. If the video was approved, the director would give them their next clue.
- At the Melbourne Star, teams had to choose one of the cars at the ferris wheel and had to climb up to the girders into the opposite direction. Once teams made into a halfway mark, they would transfer to another car from the ladder to the outside one. Once at the top, they could climb into one of the cars and had to wait to go back to the ground, where they would receive their next clue.
- At Hedgend Maze, teams had to navigate a huge extreme maze that spanned the length of one kilometre (0.62 mi) to the Finish Line at the end. There, teams would find the empty Pit Stop mat and another clue box, which informed them that they had finished and that they had to fly to Israel and learn their ultimate placement at Ariel Sharon Park.

== Ratings ==
Data courtesy of the Israeli Rating Committee, according to individuals aged 4+ from the general population.

No.	Air date	Episode	Percentage	Nightly Rank	Ref
1	17 May 2016	"Jumpstart Debut"	15.1%	1	
2	22 May 2016	"The New Teams Arrive"	13.7%	1	
3	24 May 2016	"Landing in Italy"	11.5%	1	
4	29 May 2016	"Climbing in Italy"	11.3%	1	
5	31 May 2016	"Who Will Be Eliminated in Rome?"	11.2%	1	
6	5 June 2016	"Fast and Furious"	11.7%	1	
7	7 June 2016	"Lost in Italy"	11.0%	1	
8	14 June 2016	"Leaving Italy in an Elimination Episode"	10.9%	1	
9	20 June 2016	"Landing in Romania"	9.4%	1	
10	27 June 2016	"The Dark Side of Romania"	10.2%	1	
11	28 June 2016	"The Final Elimination in Europe"	9.8%	1	
12	4 July 2016	"Landing in Africa"	10.9%	1	
13	5 July 2016	"Elimination in Africa"	10.4%	1	
14	11 July 2016	"Summit of Fear"	10.1%	1	
15	12 July 2016	"Mount Salt"	10.5%	1	
16	17 July 2016	"Dunes or Not to Be"	11.9%	1	
17	19 July 2016	"Landing in Zanzibar"	11.8%	1	
18	24 July 2016	"Dancing in Africa"	12.1%	1	
19	26 July 2016	"Leaving Zanzibar in Elimination"	12.8%	1	
20	31 July 2016	"Landing in India"	11.5%	1	
21	2 August 2016	"Indian Wedding"	12.6%	1	
22	7 August 2016	"A Colorful Farewell from India"	13.2%	1	
23	9 August 2016	"Welcome to South Korea"	12.7%	1	
24	14 August 2016	"The Mission of the Century"	12.1%	1	
25	16 August 2016	"Korean Karaoke"	12.5%	1	
26	21 August 2016	"Who Will Be Eliminated in Korea?"	11.6%	1	
27	28 August 2016	"The Big Six"	8.4%	1	
28	30 August 2016	"Landing in Vietnam"	11.7%	1	
29	4 September 2016	"The Rice Mountain"	12.2%	1	
30	6 September 2016	"Elimination from Vietnam"	12.3%	1	
31	11 September 2016	"Landing in Cambodia"	10.2%	1	
32	12 September 2016	"Bike Race"	10.5%	1	
33	13 September 2016	"Leaving Cambodia in Elimination"	10.6%	1	
34	18 September 2016	"Semifinals in Australia"	10.4%	1	
35	19 September 2016	"The Semifinals"	9.8%	1	
36	20 September 2016	"The Last Elimination"	10.9%	1	
37	26 September 2016	"Grand Finale"	13.9%	1	
38	27 September 2016	"Reunion"	8.2%	2	
