= Survivor: VIP (2019 Israeli season) =

- Season 9
- Presented by: Guy Zu-Aretz
- No. of days: 46
- No. of castaways: 18
- Winner: Đovani Roso
- Runners-up: Simcha Gueta; Naama Kasry
- Location: Caramoan, Camarines Sur, Philippines
- No. of episodes: 37

Release
- Original network: Reshet 13
- Original release: March 9 – July 13, 2019

Additional information
- Filming dates: August, 2018 – October, 2018

Season chronology
- ← Previous; Palawan Next → VIP (2020)

The 2019 season of Survivor: VIP (Hebrew: הישרדות VIP, romanized: Hisardut VIP) is the ninth season overall of the Israeli reality program Survivor and the second VIP season. The season featured 18 celebrity contestants competing against each other for the 1 million NIS prize. The season was filmed in the Philippines between August and October 2018, and aired on Reshet 13 on March 9, 2019 until July 13, 2019, when former footballer Đovani Roso was named the Sole Survivor over previous Survivor winner Naama Kasry and plus-sized model Simcha Gueta during the live finale; Kasry was named the audience's favourite player after winning a public vote.

This marks the third season to include celebrities, following the 2012 Survivor VIP season and the half-celebrity Survivor: Honduras. With the inclusion of Kasry as the season's sole returning player, this season is the second overall to include former players, after Survivor: Fans vs. Survivors. This was the first season to air on Reshet 13 following the closure of Channel 2, and the third consecutive season to air on Reshet.

This season reintroduced duels, in which two castaways were sent to a secluded location immediately following the immunity challenge to compete for a reward, as last seen in the fifth season. Before the merge, one castaway from each tribe was sent to compete; if the representative from the tribe that won the immunity challenge won the duel, they would cast a vote for the losing tribe's upcoming Tribal Council on behalf of their tribe, which was publicly revealed at the start of the losing tribe's individual immunity challenge. After the merge, the immunity challenge winner chose the two duelists. The winner spun a wheel to earn one of three prizes, while the loser received a corresponding punishment.

== Contestants ==
List of Survivor: VIP contestants
Contestant	Original tribe	Post-temptation (Note: At the Negotiation Cabin, Einat and Lihi were offered a secret advantage in exchange for eliminating one of their tribemates, who would then be replaced by Naama. Lihi took the offer and eliminated Rotem, and Naama returned to the game.)	Switched tribe	Merged tribe	Finish
Naama Kasry; Returned to game	Kankai				1st voted out Day 2
Rotem Rabi; 23, Jerusalem; Miss Israel 2017	Ipogo				Eliminated; Day 3
Moshe Primo; 58, Netanya; Sports commentator	Ipogo	Ipogo			Quit; Day 4
Dror Refael; 44, Kadima-Tzoran; Radio personality	Kankai	Kankai			2nd voted out Day 7
Einat Erlich; 50, Netanya; Actress	Kankai	Kankai			3rd voted out Day 10
Orin Julie; 24, Kiryat Ono; Model	Kankai	Kankai	Ipogo		4th voted out Day 13
Alexa Dol; 25, Tel Aviv; HaMerotz LaMillion 4, model	Ipogo	Ipogo	Ipogo		5th voted out Day 16
Lihi Griner; Returned to game	Ipogo	Ipogo	Kankai		6th voted out (Note: For accepting the Negotiation Cabin temptation on Day 3, Lihi was given a note stating that if she were voted out unanimously at the joint Tribal Council on Day 19, she would return to the game with "tremendous power"; these conditions were met, and Lihi returned to the game the following day.); Day 19
Mishel Taroni; 34, Ramat Gan; Bodybuilder	Ipogo	Ipogo	Ipogo		Medically evacuated Day 20
Jonathan "Joezi" Zirah; 30, Tel Aviv; HaMerotz LaMillion 5	Kankai	Kankai	Kankai	Tanaw	Eliminated (Note: For completing her mission of getting voted out unanimously on Day 19, Lihi returned to the game with the power to choose two contestants to compete in a duel, with the loser being eliminated from the game. Lihi chose Joezi and Shaked to compete; Shaked won and Joezi was eliminated.); 1st jury member Day 20
Eyal Berkover; 28, Lima, Peru; Actor, model	Ipogo	Ipogo	Ipogo	Tanaw	7th voted out 2nd jury member Day 22
Assaf Ashtar; 54, Hadera; Actor, comedian	Kankai	Kankai	Kankai	Tanaw	8th voted out 3rd jury member Day 25
Luna Mansour; Returned to game	Kankai	Kankai	Ipogo	Tanaw	9th voted out (Note: On Day 3, all the players drew rocks at random, to be broken upon being voted out; if the rock contained the golden fossil, the vote would be nullified and the player would immediately return to the game. Upon being voted out on Day 28, Luna's rock was revealed to contain the golden fossil, and she returned to the game.); Day 28
Simcha Gueta; Returned to game	Ipogo	Ipogo	Ipogo	Tanaw	10th voted out (Note: At the Survivor Auction, Meni and Simcha bought rocks, one with a golden fossil and one without. Upon being voted out on Day 31, Simcha's rock was revealed to contain the golden fossil, and she returned to the game.); Day 31
Luna Mansour; 26, Acre; Actress	Kankai	Kankai	Ipogo	Tanaw	11th voted out 4th jury member Day 35
Lihi Griner; 34, Petah Tikva; HaAh HaGadol 3	Ipogo	Ipogo	Kankai	Tanaw	12th voted out 5th jury member Day 39
Ira Dolfin; 37, Tel Aviv; Fitness personality	Kankai	Kankai	Ipogo	Tanaw	Eliminated (Note: For losing the elimination challenge on Day 39, Ira was immediately eliminated from the game.); 6th jury member Day 40
Shaked Komemy; 27, Rosh HaAyin; Singer	Kankai	Kankai	Kankai	Tanaw	13th voted out 7th jury member Day 42
Menahem "Meni" Naftali; 40, Afula; Benjamin Netanyahu's ex-housekeeper	Ipogo	Ipogo	Kankai	Tanaw	14th voted out 8th jury member Day 45
Simcha Gueta; 30, Bat Yam; Model	Ipogo	Ipogo	Ipogo	Tanaw	Co-runner-up
Naama Kasry; 40, Herzliya; Survivor: The Caribbean Islands winner	Kankai	Ipogo	Kankai	Tanaw	Co-runner-up
Đovani Roso; 46, Kiryat Ata; Former footballer	Ipogo	Ipogo	Kankai	Tanaw	Sole Survivor

== Season summary ==
Pre-merge challenge winners and eliminations by cycle
Episode(s)	Original air date(s)	Challenge winner(s)			Duel		Voted out	Finish
Episode(s)	Original air date(s)	Reward	Tribal immunity	Individual immunity	Winner	Loser	Voted out	Finish
1 & 2	March 9 & 11, 2019	Ipogo		None			Naama (Note: At the Negotiation Cabin, Einat and Lihi were offered a secret advantage in exchange for eliminating one of their tribemates, who would then be replaced by Naama. Lihi took the offer and eliminated Rotem, and Naama returned to the game.)	1st voted out Day 2
1 & 2	March 9 & 11, 2019	Ipogo		None			Rotem	Eliminated; Day 3
2 & 3	March 11 & 13, 2019	None	Kankai	Mishel	Alexa	Joezi	Moshe	Quit; Day 4
4 & 5	March 16 & 20, 2019	Ipogo	Ipogo	Joezi	Eyal	Orin	Dror	2nd voted out Day 7
6 & 7	March 23 & 24, 2019	Ipogo	Ipogo	Ira	Lihi	Shaked	Einat	3rd voted out Day 10
8, 9 & 10	March 27 & 30, April 3, 2019	Kankai	Kankai	Ira	Đovani	Ira	Orin	4th voted out Day 13
11, 12 & 13	April 6, 10 & 13, 2019	Ipogo	Kankai	Luna	Meni	Mishel	Alexa	5th voted out Day 16

Post-merge challenge winners and eliminations by cycle
Episode(s)	Original air date(s)	Challenge winner(s)			Duel		Voted out	Finish
Episode(s)	Original air date(s)	Reward	Immunity	Veto	Winner	Loser	Voted out	Finish
14 & 15 (Note: This cycle featured a joint Tribal Council, where both tribes went to Tribal Council to eliminate a single player; as a result, it followed the typical post-merge schedule with a veto challenge and no tribal immunity challenge.)	April 14 & 15, 2019	Ipogo	Assaf (Note: At the Negotiation Cabin, Assaf and Mishel chose one tribemate to not participate in the upcoming immunity challenge; Assaf chose himself and Mishel chose Simcha. Assaf and Simcha then earned individual immunity as a result.)	Luna	None		Lihi (Note: For accepting the Negotiation Cabin temptation on Day 3, Lihi was given a note stating that if she were voted out unanimously at the joint Tribal Council on Day 19, she would return to the game with "tremendous power"; these conditions were met, and Lihi returned to the game the following day.)	6th voted out Day 19
14 & 15	April 14 & 15, 2019	Ipogo	Simcha	Luna	None		Lihi	6th voted out Day 19
14 & 15	April 14 & 15, 2019	Ipogo	Đovani	Luna	None		Lihi	6th voted out Day 19
16, 17 & 18	April 29, May 6 & 9, 2019	Eyal (Note: The challenge was a duel between one member of each tribe; Eyal defeated Joezi. After Eyal chose whom to share his reward with, the tribes were merged.) [Assaf, Đovani, Ira, Joezi, Luna, Meni, Simcha]	Luna	Đovani	None		Mishel	Medically evacuated Day 20
16, 17 & 18	April 29, May 6 & 9, 2019	Eyal [Assaf, Đovani, Ira, Joezi, Luna, Meni, Simcha]	Luna	Đovani	None		Joezi	Eliminated (Note: For completing her mission of getting voted out unanimously on Day 19, Lihi returned to the game with the power to choose two contestants to compete in a duel, with the loser being eliminated from the game. Lihi chose Joezi and Shaked to compete; Shaked won and Joezi was eliminated.); 1st jury member Day 20
16, 17 & 18	April 29, May 6 & 9, 2019	Eyal [Assaf, Đovani, Ira, Joezi, Luna, Meni, Simcha]	Luna	Đovani	None		Eyal	7th voted out 2nd jury member Day 22
19, 20 & 21	May 11, 12 & 15, 2019	Lihi [Naama]	Shaked	Luna, Meni, Shaked (Note: The challenge was competed by teams of three; the winners collectively assigned the veto bracelet at that night's Tribal Council.)	Đovani	Assaf	Assaf	8th voted out 3rd jury member Day 25
22, 23 & 24	May 19, 25 & 26, 2019	Meni [Đovani, Luna, Naama]	Simcha	Naama	Shaked	Lihi	Luna (Note: On Day 3, all the players drew rocks at random, to be broken upon being voted out; if the rock contained the golden fossil, the vote would be nullified and the player would immediately return to the game. Upon being voted out on Day 28, Luna's rock was revealed to contain the golden fossil, and she returned to the game.)	9th voted out Day 28
25, 26 & 27	May 29, June 1 & 5, 2019	Survivor; Auction	Luna	Lihi	Ira	Simcha	Simcha (Note: At the Survivor Auction, Meni and Simcha bought rocks, one with a golden fossil and one without. Upon being voted out on Day 31, Simcha's rock was revealed to contain the golden fossil, and she returned to the game.)	10th voted out Day 31
28 & 29	June 12 & 15, 2019	Đovani [Naama]	Meni	Meni	Meni	Lihi	Luna	11th voted out 4th jury member Day 35
30, 31 & 32	June 19, 22 & 26, 2019	Meni	Naama	Meni	Shaked	Ira	Lihi	12th voted out 5th jury member Day 39
33 & 34	June 29 & July 3, 2019	None (Note: No reward challenge due to elimination challenge.)	Naama	Naama	Naama	Đovani	Ira	Eliminated (Note: For losing the elimination challenge on Day 40, Ira was immediately eliminated from the game.); 6th jury member Day 40
33 & 34	June 29 & July 3, 2019	None	Naama	Naama	Naama	Đovani	Shaked	13th voted out 7th jury member Day 42
35 & 36	July 6 & 8, 2019	Đovani	Naama	Meni (Note: For winning the final veto challenge, Meni earned the power to stop one of the jurors from voting for the winner.)	None		Meni	14th voted out 8th jury member Day 45
37	July 13, 2019						Jury vote	
37	July 13, 2019						Simcha	Runners-up
37	July 13, 2019						Naama	Runners-up
37	July 13, 2019						Đovani	Sole Survivor

== Voting history ==
	Original tribes		Post-temptation (Note: At the Negotiation Cabin, Einat and Lihi were offered a secret advantage in exchange for eliminating one of their tribemates, who would then be replaced by Naama. Lihi took the offer and eliminated Rotem, and Naama returned to the game.)			Switched tribes				Merged tribe										
Episode #	2		3	5	7	10	13	15	17		18	21	24	27	29		32	33	34	36
Day #	2	3	4	7	10	13	16	19 (Note: On Day 19, a joint Tribal Council was held where both tribes voted together to eliminate one castaway.)	20		22	25	28	31	35		39	40	42	45
Eliminated	Naama	Rotem	Moshe	Dror	Einat	Orin	Alexa	Lihi	Mishel	Joezi	Eyal	Assaf	Luna	Simcha	Luna		Lihi	Ira	Shaked	Meni
Votes	7–2	Eliminated	Quit (Note: After the votes were cast at Tribal Council but before they were read, Moshe decided to quit the game, thus cancelling the votes.)	5–4	5–2–0 (Note: Ira won the individual immunity challenge, therefore the Ipogo tribe's vote against her did not count.)	4–4 (Note: The initial vote resulted in a tie between Alexa and Orin; as such, the tie was resolved by a firemaking competition, which Alexa won.)	6–1	11–0 (Note: For accepting the Negotiation Cabin temptation on Day 3, Lihi was given a note stating that if she were voted out unanimously at the joint Tribal Council on Day 19, she would return to the game with "tremendous power"; these conditions were met, and Lihi returned to the game the following day.)	Evacuated (Note: Mishel was medically evacuated from the game.)	Challenge (Note: For completing her mission of getting voted out unanimously on Day 19, Lihi returned to the game with the power to choose two contestants to compete in a duel, with the loser being eliminated from the game. Lihi chose Joezi and Shaked to compete; Shaked won and Joezi was eliminated.)	4–0 (Note: Naama played a hidden immunity idol on Lihi, therefore the five votes against her were not counted.)	5–4	5–2 (Note: On Day 3, all the players drew rocks at random, to be broken upon being voted out; if the rock contained the golden fossil, the vote would be nullified and the player would immediately return to the game. Upon being voted out on day 28, Luna's rock was revealed to contain the golden fossil, and she returned to the game.)	4–2–1 (Note: At the Survivor Auction, Meni and Simcha bought rocks, one with a golden fossil and one without. Upon being voted out on Day 31, Simcha's rock was revealed to contain the golden fossil, and she returned to the game.)	5–3		3–1–0 (Note: Ira played a hidden immunity idol on Meni, therefore the three votes against him were not counted.)	Challenge (Note: For losing the elimination challenge on Day 40, Ira was immediately eliminated from the game.)	3–1	3–1
Voter	Vote																			
Đovani			~~?~~					Lihi			~~Lihi~~	Assaf	Luna	Shaked	Luna		~~Meni~~		Shaked	Meni
Naama	Dror		~~?~~					Lihi			Eyal	Assaf	Luna	Meni	Luna		~~Meni~~		Shaked	Meni
Simcha			~~?~~			Orin	Alexa	Lihi			~~Lihi~~	Assaf	Luna	Shaked	Luna	Luna (Note: Simcha played an extra vote advantage, allowing her to cast two ballots during a single vote.)	~~Meni~~		Shaked	Meni
Meni			~~Lihi~~					Lihi			~~Lihi~~	Naama	None (Note: This castaway was given the veto bracelet, and was therefore not eligible to vote.)	Simcha	Đovani		Lihi		None	Simcha
Shaked	Naama			Dror	Einat			Lihi		Win	Eyal	Naama	Ira	Simcha	Đovani		Lihi		Simcha	
Ira	Naama			Orin	Einat	Alexa	Alexa	Lihi			Eyal	Assaf	Luna	None (Note: At the Survivor Auction, Meni bought an additional veto bracelet to be used at the next Tribal Council, which he gave on Ira.)	None		Lihi	Lose		
Lihi			~~Meni~~					None			None	None	Luna	Simcha	Luna		None			
Luna	Naama			Dror	Einat	Alexa	Alexa	Lihi			~~Lihi~~	Naama	Ira	None	Đovani					
Assaf	Naama			Orin	Orin			Lihi			Eyal	Naama								
Eyal			~~?~~			Orin	Alexa	Lihi			~~Lihi~~									
Joezi	Naama			Dror	Einat			Lihi		Lose										
Mishel			~~Lihi~~			Orin	Alexa	Lihi												
Alexa			~~?~~			Orin	Eyal													
Orin	Naama			Dror	Einat	Alexa														
Einat	Dror			Orin	Orin															
Dror	Naama			Orin																
Moshe			~~?~~																	
Rotem																				
Penalty				Dror (Note: As the immunity challenge-losing tribe's representative lost the subsequent duel, the winning tribe collectively cast a vote for the losing tribe's Tribal Council.)	~~Ira~~	Alexa	Alexa					Assaf (Note: For losing the duel, this contestant was punished with a penalty vote at the next Tribal Council.)		Simcha (Note: At the Negotiation Cabin, Lihi and Luna had to choose to cast a penalty vote against one competitor; they chose Simcha.)			Ira			

Jury vote
Episode #	37		
Day #	46		
Finalist	Simcha	Naama	Đovani
Votes	7–0–0		
Juror	Vote		
Meni			Đovani
Shaked			Đovani
Ira			Đovani
Lihi	None (Note: For winning the final veto challenge, Meni earned the power to stop one of the jurors from voting for the winner; He chose Lihi.)		
Luna			Đovani
Assaf			Đovani
Eyal			Đovani
Joezi			Đovani
