= Flag throwing =

Sport

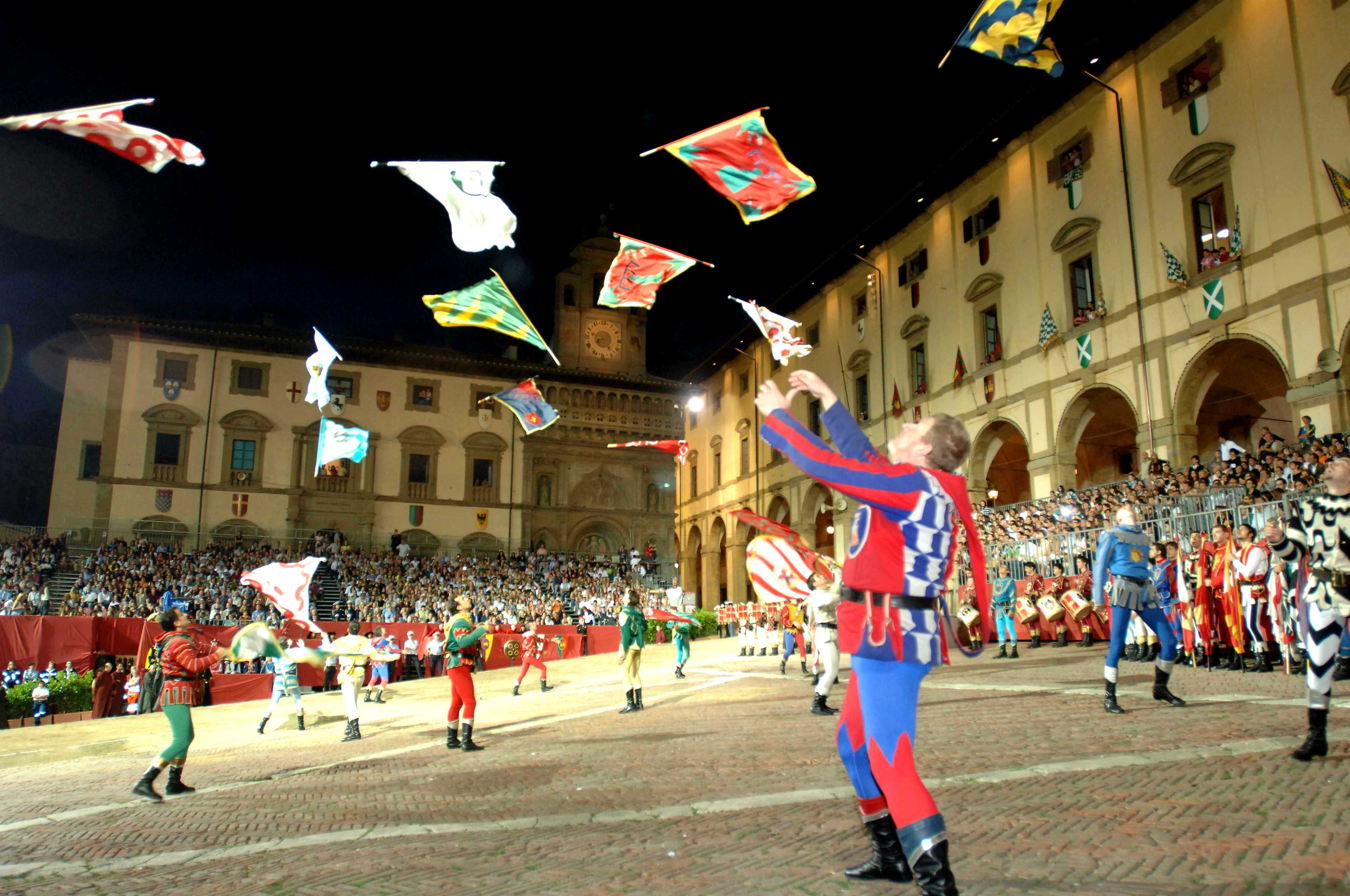
Sbandieratori

Flag throwing, known in the US as "color guard" and in Italy as "sbandieratore", is considered both an art and a sport combined. Historically, it would accompany military or marching bands, however it has now become a competitive sport in its own right.

== History ==
The origins of flag throwing are difficult to pinpoint - it has possible roots in Roman, Babylonian and Assyrian history. It was popular with medieval guilds (principally in Italy, Germany, Switzerland, Flanders, and Southern Netherlands) for use during times of war, to allow troops to communicate to each other across the battleground. A guild's banner or flag was considered a symbol of purity, and as such it was not allowed to touch the ground. After a battle was won, flag bearers, along with military bands, would take part in victory parades on their return home.

Today, flag throwing is part of many traditional festivals in Italy, such as Siena's Palio. It is also a popular sport in schools in the US, where it is known as "color guard". Color guard is practiced along with marching bands.
