= Who Wants to Be a Millionaire? (Israeli game show) =

Israeli television quiz show

- Titlecard of the show (2006–2007)
- Hebrew: מי רוצה להיות מיליונר
- Presented by: Erez Tal
- Country of origin: Israel

Production
- Production location: Tel Aviv (2020-2021)
- Running time: Up to 49 minutes

Original release
- Network: Channel 2
- Release: November 18, 1999 – October 31, 2003
- Network: Channel 10
- Release: May 3, 2006 – April 30, 2007
- Network: Channel 12
- Release: July 16, 2020 – April 16, 2021

Logo (2000–2003)

מי רוצה להיות מיליונר?, translit. Mi Rotze Lihyot Milyoner?, is an Israeli game show based on the original British format of Who Wants to Be a Millionaire?. The show started broadcasting in 1999 on Channel 2 with Yoram Arbel as host, and moved to Channel 10 in 2006. It returned in 2020 on Channel 12 with Erez Tal, who had guest hosted an episode in 2003.

The main goal of the game was to win ₪1,000,000 by answering 15 multiple-choice questions correctly. Contestants who answered their fifth question correctly won at least ₪1000, and those who answered their tenth question correctly won at least ₪32,000.

One contestant, Izhar Nevo, won the top prize, on 7 August 2000. Nevo used his final lifeline, 50/50, on the last question and when still unsure of the answer tossed a coin to pick from the remaining two to win the top prize.

== Payout structure ==
Question number	Question value
Question number	(Yellow zones are the guaranteed levels)
1	₪100
2	₪200
3	₪300
4	₪500
5	₪1,000
6	₪2,000
7	₪4,000
8	₪8,000
9	₪16,000
10	₪32,000
11	₪64,000
12	₪125,000
13	₪250,000
14	₪500,000
15	₪1,000,000
