= Isla del Rey, Panama =

Island in Panama

Coordinates: 8°22′N 78°55′W

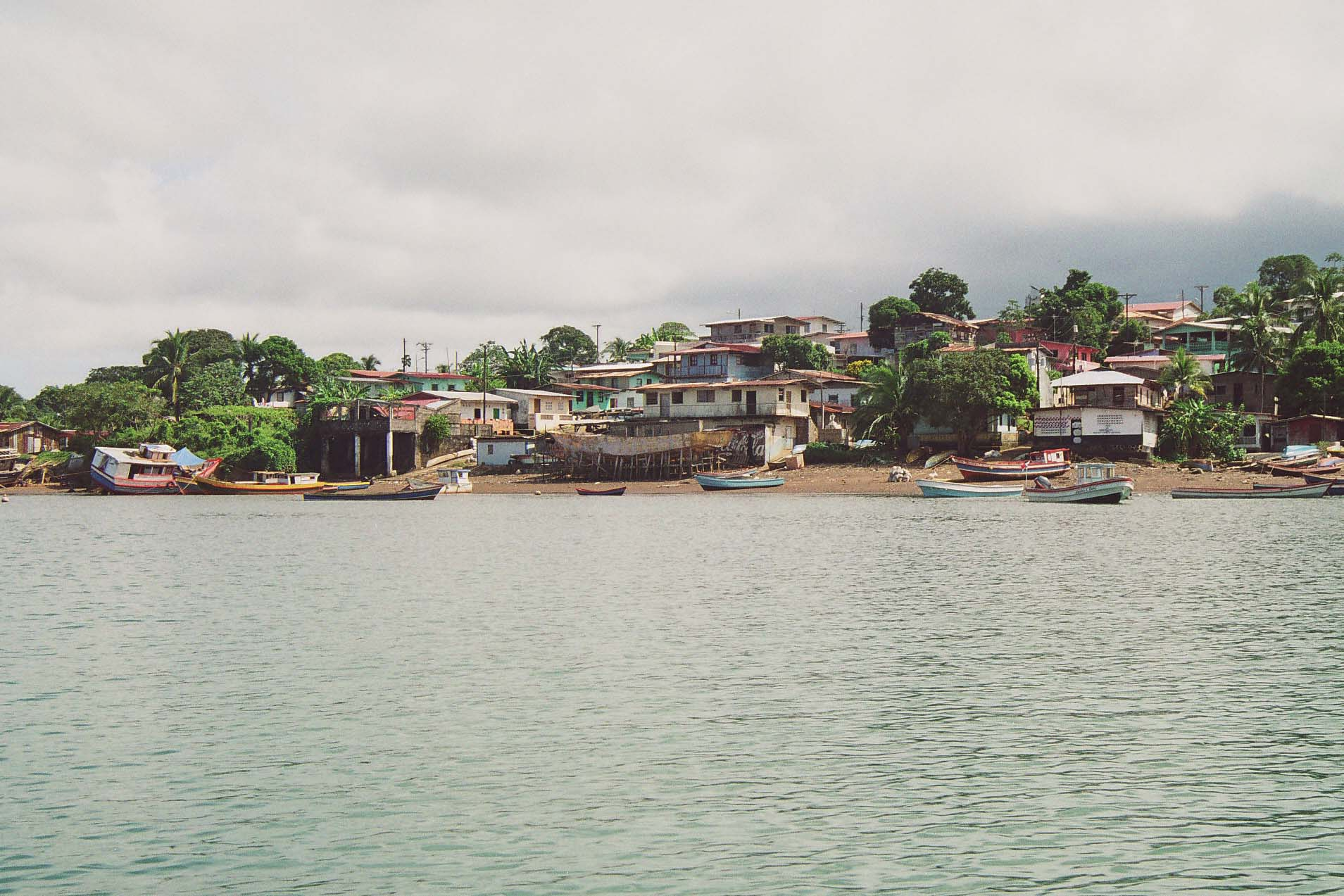
San Miguel, Isla del Rey, 2003

Isla del Rey is the largest island in the Pearl Islands in the Gulf of Panama. It spans 234 square kilometres (90 sq mi), and hosts a population of 1,676 (census 2000). Its name is probably more a reference to Christ the King than to a secular king.

The four settlements are San Miguel (pop. 967), La Esmeralda (pop. 524), La Ensenada (pop. 94) and La Guinea (pop. 83). It is larger than the other Pearl Islands combined, and is the second largest island in Panama, after Coiba.

The first European to see Isla del Rey was Vasco Núñez de Balboa in October 1513 on his first expedition to the Pacific Ocean. He could see the islands only from afar, as poor weather prevented his canoes from landing. He named the island Isla Rica (Rich Island).

Survivor:Pearl Islands was filmed on Isla del Rey.
