= Isla Gibraleón =

Island in Panama

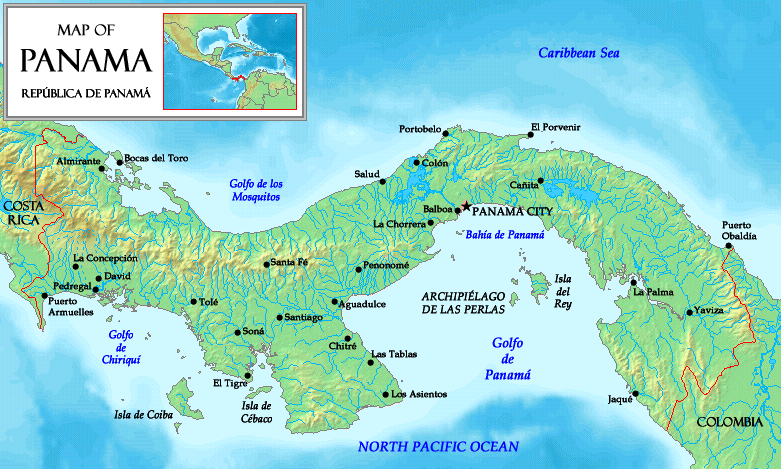
- Location of the Pearl Islands archipelago

- Location within Panama

Geography
- Location: Gulf of Panama
- Coordinates: 8°31′N 79°03′W
- Archipelago: Pearl Islands archipelago
- Adjacent to: Gulf of Panama
- Area: 112.35 ha (277.6 acres)
- Coastline: 8 km (5 mi)
- Highest elevation: 11 m (36 ft)

Administration
- Panama

Additional information
- Time zone: Eastern (UTC-5)

Isla Gibraleón is a small, uninhabited Panamanian island that is part of the Pearl Islands archipelago (Spanish: Archipielago de las Perlas) in the Gulf of Panama. It is located 2 km (1.2 mi) west of Isla Casaya, and is part of a group of 200 or more islands and islets (many tiny and uninhabited) lying about 30 miles (48 km) off the Pacific coast of Panama. The island has an eight-kilometre (5.0-mile) coastline, five beaches, a mangrove swamp, and is covered in 153.18 acres (61.99 ha) of dense jungle. It has a total surface area of 277.62 acres (112.35 ha), which makes it the 12th largest island in the archipelago. Isla Gibraleón rises to a height of 11 metres (36 ft) above sea level, and is in the Eastern Time Zone (UTC−05:00).

== Climate ==
The Intertropical Convergence Zone (ITCZ), known by sailors as the Doldrums, governs the climate of Isla Gibraleón. March is the warmest month, with an average temperature of 32.5 °C (90.5 °F); January is the coldest, averaging 21.9 °C (71.4 °F) at night. Due to its proximity to the equator, Isla Gibraleón does not have distinct seasons. Variations in the location of the ITCZ drastically affect rainfall in many equatorial regions, resulting in the wet-and-dry seasons of the tropics rather than the cold-and-warm seasons of higher latitudes. Isla Gibraleón's wet season occurs from May to December, when the ITCZ is over (or slightly north of) Panama. This period is characterised by light, variable winds and heavy rainfall. The dry season, characterised by clear skies and predominantly northeastern Caribbean trade winds, is from January to April (when the ITCZ is south of Panama). The island's location in the Pearl Islands archipelago protects it from the effects of El Niño and allows the surrounding waters—usually between 28 and 29 °C (82 and 84 °F) during the wet season—to sustain the uninterrupted evolution of new marine species, including whale and tiger sharks, sperm whales, sea turtles, angel rays and large schools of fish.

== In popular culture ==
Isla Gibraleon was used for the Morgan Tribe on the television show Survivor: Pearl Islands in 2003. Isla Gibraleón was the men's island in the first series of The Island with Bear Grylls, and the women's island in the second series. In the first series (which began on 5 May 2014), thirteen British men were taken to the island by Bear Grylls for a month; they were left alone, with the clothes they wore and some basic tools, to film themselves. For the second series (in April 2015) the format was repeated, with a team of 14 British men living on another island in the archipelago—Isla San Telmo—and Isla Gibraleón home to 14 British women.

In 2021 the swedish version of the television series The Island Sverige was filmed on the island. 8 famous swedish men and women was stranded there for 14 days.

== See also ==
- Desert island
- List of islands
