= San Miguel Airport (Panama) =

- IATA: NMG; ICAO: MPMI

Summary
- Airport type: Public
- Serves: San Miguel, Panama
- Location: Isla del Rey (Pearl Islands)
- Elevation AMSL: 70 ft / 21 m
- Coordinates: 8°27′25″N 78°56′00″W

Map
- Location of the airport in Panama

Runways
Direction	Length		Surface
Direction	m	ft	Surface
02/20	580	1,903	Concrete
- Source: HERE Maps GCM

San Miguel Airport (IATA: NMG, ICAO: MPMI) is an airport serving San Miguel, a town in the Pearl Islands of Panama. It is just east of the town, on the northern side of Isla del Rey, the largest of the islands.

Northeast approach and departure are over the water. There is rising terrain south of the airport.

The Taboga Island VOR-DME (Ident: TBG) is located 42.2 nautical miles (78 km) west-northwest of San Miguel. The La Palma VOR (Ident: PML) is located 47.4 nautical miles (88 km) east of the airport.

== See also ==
- Transport in Panama
- List of airports in Panama
