= Fernando Eleta Airport =

- IATA: none; ICAO: MPFE

Summary
- Airport type: Public
- Serves: Isla Pedro Gonzalez, Panama
- Elevation AMSL: 311 ft / 95 m
- Coordinates: 8°24′40″N 79°06′40″W

Map
- Location of the airport in Panama

Runways
Direction	Length		Surface
Direction	m	ft	Surface
01/19	1,000	3,281	Asphalt
- Sources: Aviapages

Fernando Eleta Airport (ICAO: MPFE) is an airport serving the village of Pedro de Cocal on Isla Pedro Gonzalez, one of the Pearl Islands of Panama.

== See also ==
- Transport in Panama
- List of airports in Panama
