= The Island with Bear Grylls =

British reality television show

- Also known as: Treasure Island with Bear Grylls
- Genre: Reality
- Directed by: Matt Bennett; Danny Etheridgel; Rupert Smith
- Starring: Bear Grylls
- Narrated by: Bear Grylls
- Country of origin: United Kingdom
- Original language: English
- No. of series: 6
- No. of episodes: 44

Production
- Executive producers: Bear Grylls; Ben Mitchell; Delbert Shoopman; Tim Whitwell
- Production locations: Isla Gibraleón, Isla San Telmo and Isla Bayoneta, Pearl Islands, Panama
- Running time: 60 minutes (inc. adverts)
- Production companies: Shine TV; Bear Grylls Ventures

Original release
- Network: Channel 4
- Release: 5 May 2014 – 6 October 2019

Related
- Celebrity Island with Bear Grylls; Surviving the Island with Bear Grylls

The Island with Bear Grylls is a British reality television programme which premiered on Channel 4 on 5 May 2014 and ran for five series, plus a renamed sixth series and a spin-off series. Narrated by Bear Grylls, participants in the show are placed on remote uninhabited islands as a test of their survival skills. They are left completely alone, filming themselves, with only the clothes they are wearing and some basic tools and training.

Initially pitched as an assessment of the capabilities of British men in the 21st century, the first series (2014) featured 13 male participants. Following accusations of sexism, the second series (2015) used two islands, with 14 women on one, and 14 men on the other. The third series (2016) featured eight men and eight women abandoned on opposite sides of a single island with the groups merging in episode 2. The fourth series (2017) focused primarily on age rather than gender and featured initially separate tribes of older (30- to 66-year-old) people versus younger people (18 to 30 years old). The fifth series (2018) involved people from different social classes based on their yearly salary earnings.

The sixth series, now renamed Treasure Island with Bear Grylls, started airing on 8 September 2019. This series is the first to involve cash prizes, dropped from air to the island for the participants to find. A celebrity spin-off version, Celebrity Island with Bear Grylls, was first broadcast as part of a charity campaign for Stand Up to Cancer UK in September 2016.

On 22 September 2019, Channel 4 confirmed that The Island would not return for a seventh series in 2020. The seventh series was due to be filmed and aired in 2020, but due to the COVID-19 pandemic, both the civilian and celebrity series would not return for 2021.

== Premise ==
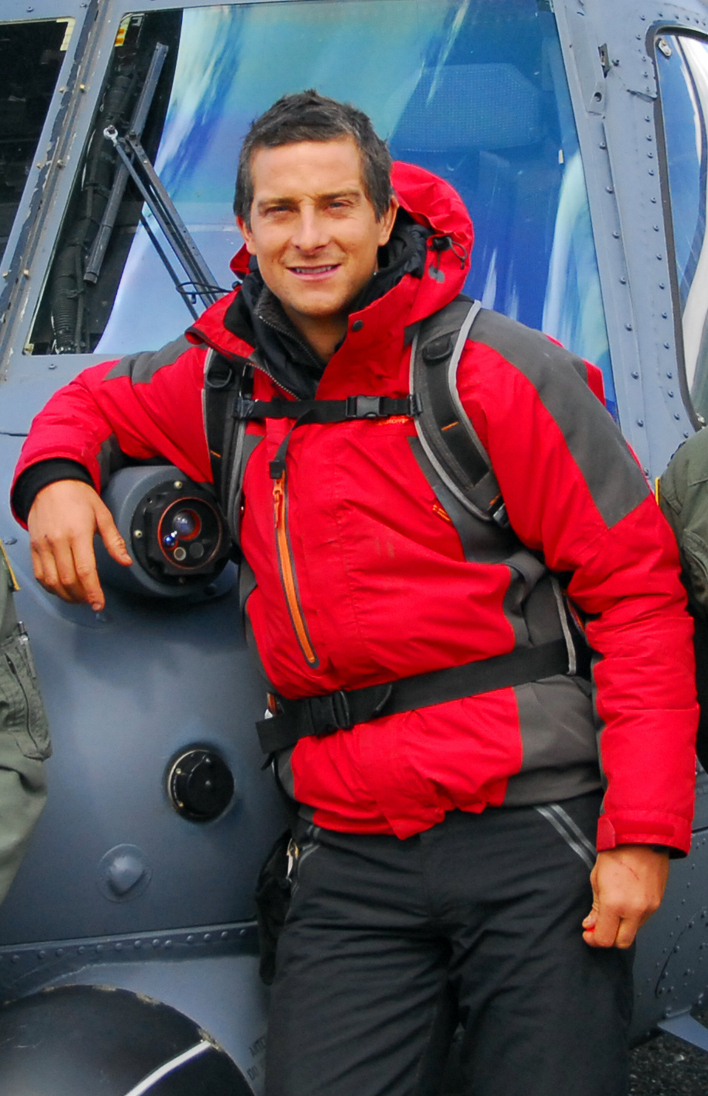
Bear Grylls is the survivor celebrity face behind the franchise.

In promoting the first series, the show was pitched as a challenge for modern men, to see if they can survive when marooned on a Pacific island armed only with minimal tools and their own initiative. According to Bear Grylls, masculinity (and machismo) is in crisis, and he is interested if men can survive after being stripped of the luxuries of 21st-century living; the show is therefore also a social experiment to see if man can recapture his primeval instincts.

For the first series, the participants had to survive for one month. For the second series, this was extended to six weeks. The participants stayed on the island for five weeks in the fifth series, and cash prize was introduced.

== Production ==
=== Locations ===
The first series was filmed on an uninhabited Pacific island, Isla Gibraleón, which is one of the Pearl Islands off the coast of Panama. The island has an 8-kilometre (5.0-mile) coastline, five beaches, a mangrove swamp, and is covered with jungle. The mangrove swamp is located on the east coast of the island where the men were dropped off, and the main sandy beach is on the west coast where the men set camp.

The second series used two islands in the same archipelago, the women reusing the island from the first series, Isla Gibraleón, while the men were allocated Isla San Telmo. This series was filmed in the rainy season which presented additional challenges. Isla San Telmo was again used in the third series. In the fourth series, a larger island, Isla Bayoneta, and a smaller neighbouring island, close enough to reach at low tide, were used for two sets of participants of different age groups. In the fifth series, the two teams were left to survive again on Isla Gibraleón. The sixth series (Treasure Island) features Isla Bayoneta once again.

=== Resources and training ===
According to Channel 4, an island that has the natural resources necessary for the men to survive a month was chosen. Additional yuca plants were planted in order to supplement the existing supply, extra animals indigenous to the islands such as caiman were also added, and a fresh water source was topped up before filming. The participants were given training about animals native to the island that are on the protected species list, and each received one day's survival training, including advice on how to catch and humanely kill caiman. The men were given machetes and knives, head torches, an initial one-day water supply, and an emergency medical kit. In addition, the participants had GPS spot trackers, and access to radio and satellite phone in case of an emergency. The second series participants were given two days survival training.

== Controversy ==
=== Allegations of fakery ===
The press made claims about fakery in the show, for its first series, saying that the water was supplied on the island by adding a rubber-lined pool, and two caiman crocodiles were released on the island, and that some of the trained crew had experience of surviving in extreme environments in the wild. Grylls, however, rejected the claims, and said that it was necessary to make sure that there would be just enough resources to sustain the participants, and that caiman crocodiles were added to the island so that if the men or women were to kill them, the natural ecosystem would not be damaged.

=== Sexism claim ===
The first series was criticised as "sexist" by female survival experts for excluding women from the challenge. Lisa Fenton suggested that it was "sexism and it's deeply rooted", and Ruth England expressed disappointment with Channel 4's decision as it "perpetuates the myth that women need to be taken care of", while Sarah Outen criticised the "male-oriented bias with adventure TV programmes". In response, Bear Grylls denied that the show was sexist, and said that the series was intended as a study of masculinity of modern man and their struggles. He then indicated an interest in doing an all-women version and that he "can't wait to do modern women's struggles."

Rupert Hawksley of The Daily Telegraph felt that the second series, despite the presence of women, was "every bit as sexist" as the first series, saying the sexes were needlessly segregated and stereotypes allowed to flourish.

=== Use of wildlife ===
The killing of the caiman in the first series sparked a number of complaints to Ofcom, a British government agency. A spokesman for PETA said that it showed "a deep ignorance of who animals are and a callous disregard for life", and that the ones who caught and tied up the animal "should be prosecuted". Ofcom however judged that the show did not break the rules.

In the second series, there were further criticisms after it was revealed that a crocodile killed by the men was not a caiman but a protected species: the American crocodile. Channel 4 apologised for the error and said, "The relevant national environment agency are aware of the incident and have granted a license to replace the animal which has now been done." The second series elicited more than 600 complaints from viewers (450 to Channel 4, 185 to Ofcom); most of the complainants accused the show of "killing animals to boost ratings".

== Reception ==
=== Reviews ===
Grace Dent of The Independent thought the show is interesting television as it is "an attempt to form a show around utterly normal, non-fame hungry, not particularly pretty, non-celeb males", but found the first episode to be "an hour of rather plotless bumbling and twig friction." Euan Ferguson of The Observer expressed concern about the "producer selection" of mollycoddled males who might fail to cope with the wilds of the island, but thought that the participants might "make a fist of surviving, and confound a few lazy stereotypes", and that he was "semi-hooked".

Regarding the second series, Charlotte Runcie of The Daily Telegraph thought that watching people learning to "cooperate in extreme situations is always strangely compelling." The participants' struggle with survival prompted joking references to Lord of the Flies.

=== Awards and nominations ===
The first series was nominated in the Reality & Constructed Factual category in the 2015 British Academy Television Awards and won.

Year	Award	Category	Recipient	Results	Ref.
2015	RTS Programme Awards	Popular, Factual and Features	The Island with Bear Grylls	Won	
2015	BAFTA TV Awards	Reality & Constructed Factual	The Island with Bear Grylls	Won	

=== Ratings ===
The first series had an average figure of 3.1 million viewers per episode. The average viewing figure for the second series was 2.9 million.

== Series overview ==
Series	Episodes	Originally released	
Series	Episodes	First released	Last released
1	6	5 May 2014	2 June 2014
2	13	8 April 2015	21 May 2015
3	7	28 March 2016	3 May 2016
4	6	23 April 2017	14 May 2017
5	6	2 April 2018	1 May 2018
6	6	8 September 2019	6 October 2019

== Episodes ==
Episode viewing figures below from BARB but do not include Channel 4 +1. Ratings starting 2019 give total viewing figures including all platforms.

=== Series 1 (2014) ===
The first series was first broadcast on Monday nights.

No. overall	No. in series	Title	Original air date	UK viewers (millions)
1	1	Episode 1	5 May 2014	2.74
2	2	Episode 2	12 May 2014	2.69
3	3	Episode 3	19 May 2014	2.90
4	4	Episode 4	26 May 2014	2.36
5	5	Episode 5	2 June 2014	2.48
6	6	Surviving the Island	2 June 2014	1.66

=== Series 2 (2015) ===
On 23 May 2014, it was announced that The Island had been recommissioned for a second series to air in 2015. In the second series, the men and women were featured on separate episodes on consecutive nights each week. Two episodes were broadcast each week – a Wednesday episode focused on the men's island, while the Thursday episode was for the women. Due to the United Kingdom general election on 7 May 2015, only the women's episode was shown that week, and the men's episode was pushed back a week. A final special episode, Surviving the Island, followed on 21 May. The competitors remained on the island for five weeks.

No. overall	No. in series	Title	Original air date	UK viewers (millions)
7	1	Episode 1	8 April 2015	2.28
8	2	Episode 2	9 April 2015	2.28
9	3	Episode 3	15 April 2015	3.02
10	4	Episode 4	16 April 2015	3.18
11	5	Episode 5	22 April 2015	2.86
12	6	Episode 6	23 April 2015	3.11
13	7	Episode 7	29 April 2015	2.90
14	8	Episode 8	30 April 2015	2.68
15	9	Episode 9	6 May 2015	2.95
16	10	Episode 10	13 May 2015	3.08
17	11	Episode 11	14 May 2015	3.01
18	12	Episode 12	20 May 2015	2.80
19	13	Surviving the Island	21 May 2015	1.99

=== Series 3 (2016) ===
The third series was broadcast on Monday nights, a return to the scheduling of the first series.

No. overall	No. in series	Title	Original air date	UK viewers (millions)
20	1	Episode 1	28 March 2016	3.33
21	2	Episode 2	4 April 2016	2.93
22	3	Episode 3	11 April 2016	2.90
23	4	Episode 4	18 April 2016	2.72
24	5	Episode 5	25 April 2016	2.78
25	6	Episode 6	2 May 2016	2.35
26	7	Surviving the Island	3 May 2016	1.32

=== Series 4 (2017) ===
The fourth series was broadcast from 23 April 2017.

No. overall	No. in series	Title	Original air date	UK viewers (millions)
27	1	Episode 1	23 April 2017	2.46
28	2	Episode 2	24 April 2017	1.91
29	3	Episode 3	1 May 2017	2.35
30	4	Episode 4	8 May 2017	2.06
31	5	Episode 5	14 May 2017	1.92
32	6	Surviving the Island	14 May 2017	1.29

=== Series 5 (2018) ===
The fifth series was broadcast from 2 April 2018. It took largely the same format as the fourth series with two different groups of people. However, the groups were made up of high-earning people (with an average salary of more than £100,000) and low-earning people (each with a salary lower than the UK national average).

No. overall	No. in series	Title	Original air date	UK viewers (millions)
33	1	Episode 1	2 April 2018	2.93
34	2	Episode 2	9 April 2018	2.64
35	3	Episode 3	16 April 2018	2.50
36	4	Episode 4	23 April 2018	2.63
37	5	Episode 5	30 April 2018	2.58
38	6	Surviving the Island	1 May 2018	1.17

=== Series 6: Treasure Island with Bear Grylls (2019) ===
On 1 May 2018, it was confirmed at the end of the fifth series that The Island would return for a sixth and final series, set to air on 8 September 2019. It was confirmed in February 2019 that for the first time there would be a winners cash prize and that the islanders will be against each other. It was also confirmed that the show will be renamed Treasure Island with Bear Grylls. In the course of series, £100,000 were parachuted from air to the island for the participants to find. Episode 44 'Surviving Treasure Island' was the last ever episode to air.

No. overall	No. in series	Title	Original air date	UK viewers (millions)
39	1	Episode 1	8 September 2019	1.99
40	2	Episode 2	15 September 2019	2.04
41	3	Episode 3	22 September 2019	1.77
42	4	Episode 4	29 September 2019	1.76
43	5	Episode 5	6 October 2019	1.98
44	6	Surviving Treasure Island	6 October 2019	TBC

== Celebrity Island with Bear Grylls ==
A celebrity version of The Island was first broadcast as part of a charity campaign for Stand Up to Cancer UK in September 2016. It was confirmed on 3 May 2017 that a second series of Celebrity Island with Bear Grylls, which aired later in August 2017 and would raise money for Stand Up to Cancer as the first series did.

There were three celebrity series which ran from 18 September 2016 to 7 October 2018.

== International adaptations ==
The American version of the show was announced on 28 January 2015, and it premiered on 25 May 2015 on NBC.

The Spanish adaptation of the show, titled La Isla, premiered on 17 May 2017 on laSexta.

The Dutch adaption of the show, simply titled The Island, premiered on 21 January 2016 on Net5.

Furthermore, there is a French, a Swedish and a Danish version.

== See also ==
- Alone
- Survivor
