= Balboa District =

Balboa
- District
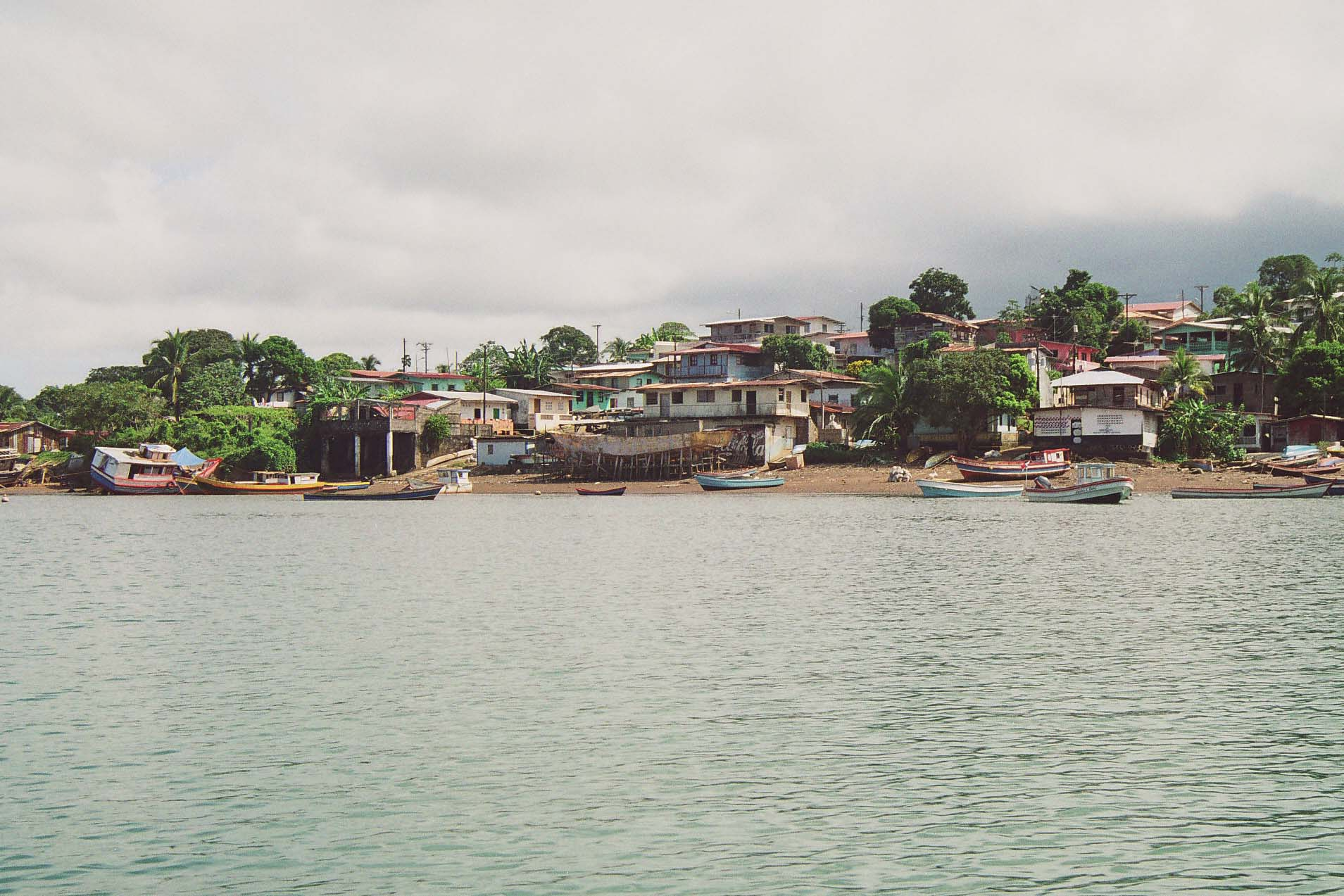
- San Miguel

- Location of the district capital in Panama
- Coordinates: 8°22′9″N 78°54′37″W
- Country: Panama
- Province: Panamá
- Capital: San Miguel

Area
  - Total: 333 km^{2} (129 sq mi)

Population (2019)
  - Total: 3,332
  - Density: 10.0/km^{2} (25.9/sq mi)
- official estimate
- Time zone: UTC-5 (ETZ)

Balboa is an island district (distrito) of Panamá Province in Panama, covering the offshore Pearl Islands lying in the Gulf of Panama southeast of Panama City. The population according to the 2000 census was 2,336; the latest official estimate (for 2019) is 3,332. The district covers a total area of 333 km^{2}. The capital lies at the town of San Miguel.

== Administrative divisions ==
Balboa District is divided administratively into the following corregimientos:

- San Miguel (capital)
- La Ensenada
- La Esmeralda
- La Guinea
- Pedro González
- Saboga
