= San Miguel, Panamá Province =

Coordinates: 8.4572°N 78.9369°W

San Miguel
- Corregimiento
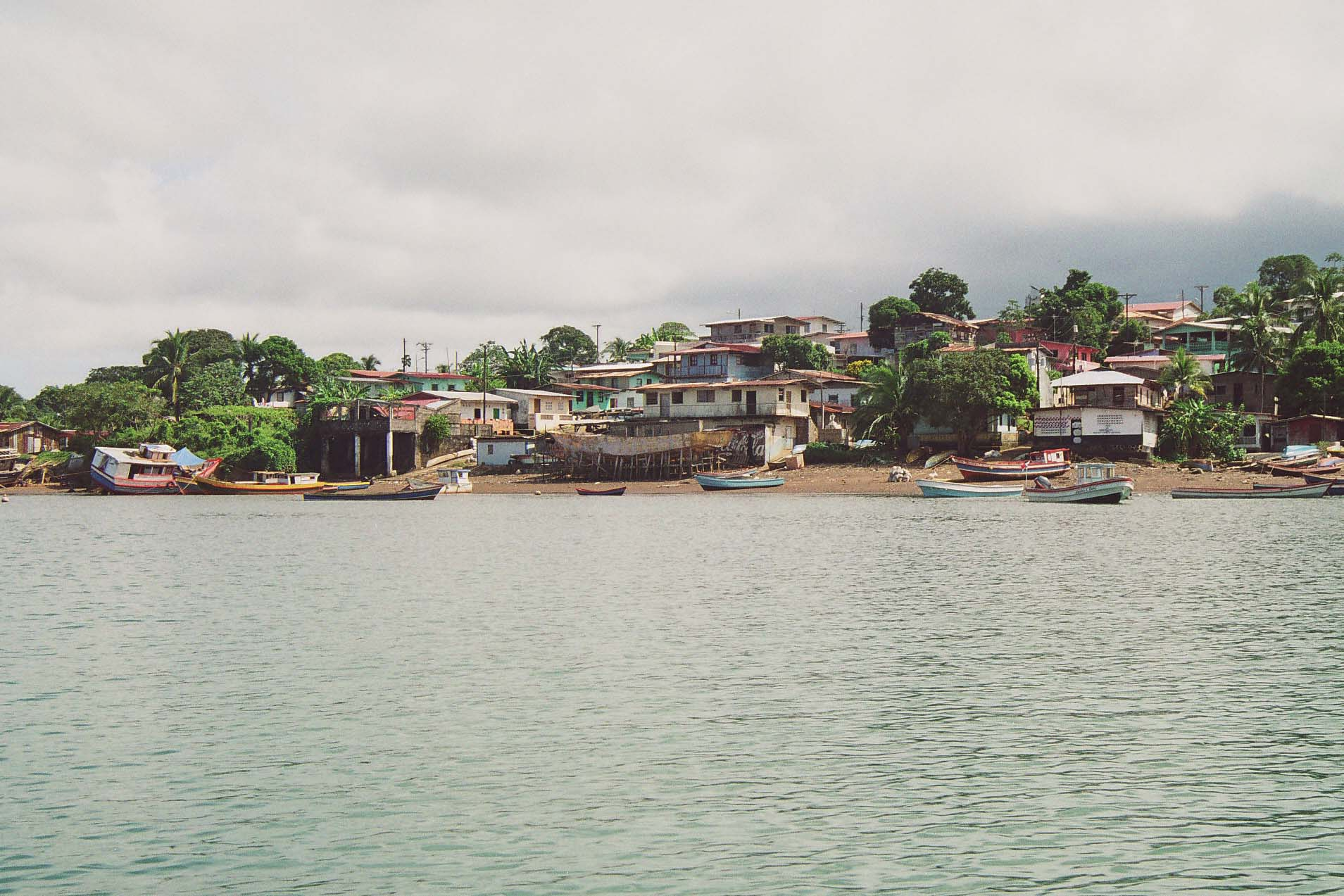

- Location within Panama
- Country: Panama
- Province: Panamá
- District: Balboa

Area
  - Land: 129.9 km^{2} (50.2 sq mi)

Population (2010)
  - Total: 1,044
  - Density: 8/km^{2} (21/sq mi)
- Population density calculated based on land area.
- Time zone: UTC−5 (EST)

San Miguel is a corregimiento in Balboa District, Panamá Province, Panama with a population of 1,044 as of 2010. It is the seat of Balboa District. Its population as of 1990 was 1,179; its population as of 2000 was 817.

The town is on the northern shore of Isla del Rey, the largest island in the Pearl Islands archipelago. It is served by San Miguel Airport.
