= Pedro González, Panama =

Coordinates: 8.4167°N 79.1000°W

Pedro González
- Corregimiento
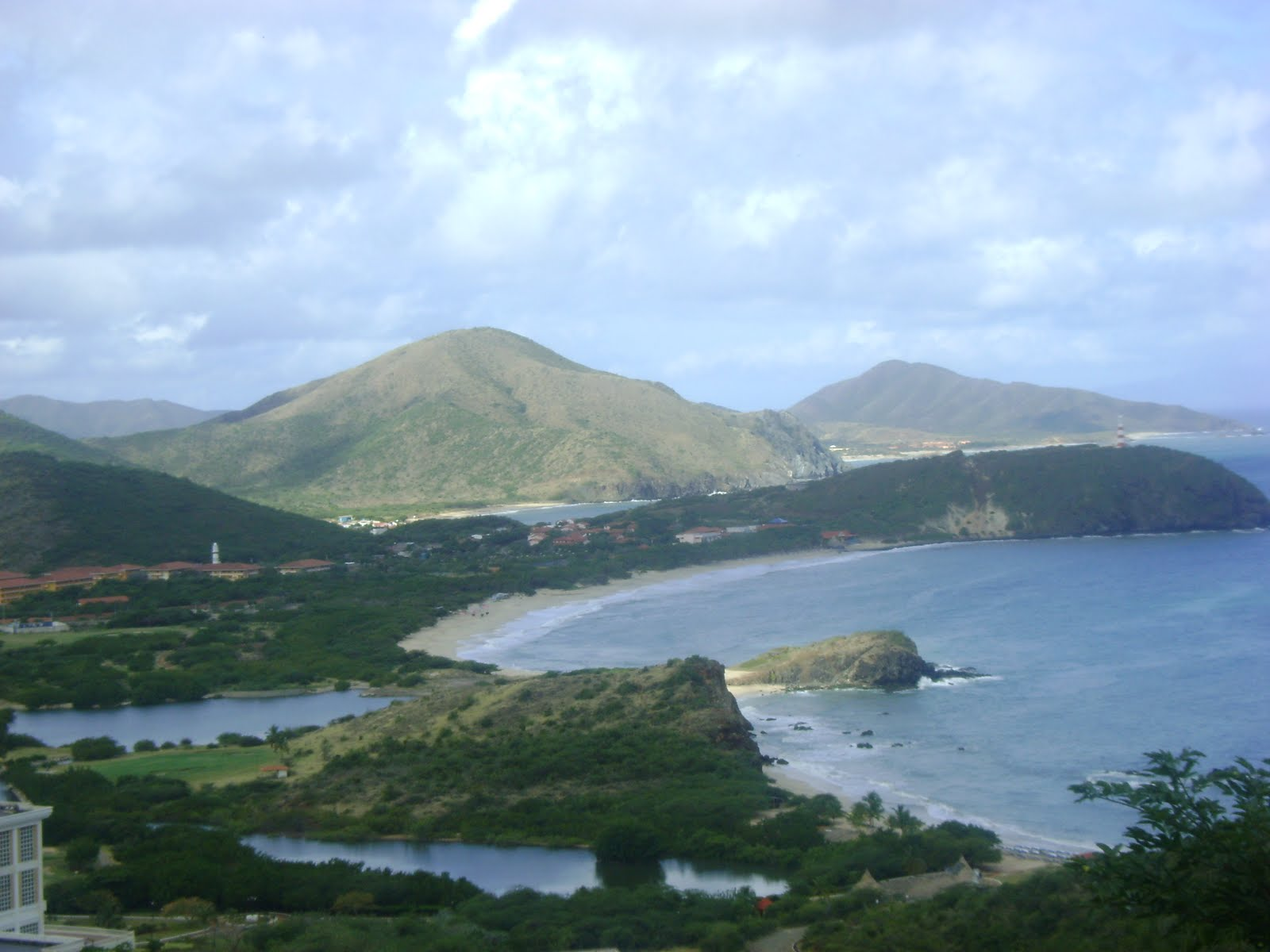
- Pedro Gonzalez looks from the road

- Location within Panama
- Country: Panama
- Province: Panamá
- District: Balboa

Area
  - Land: 59.7 km^{2} (23.1 sq mi)

Population (2010)
  - Total: 263
  - Density: 4.4/km^{2} (11/sq mi)
- Population density calculated based on land area.
- Time zone: UTC−5 (EST)

Pedro González is one of the Pearl Islands of Panama. It is a corregimiento in Balboa District, Panamá Province with a population of 263 as of 2010, mostly in the village of Pedro de Cocal. Its population as of 1990 was 440; its population as of 2000 was 247.

It is served by Fernando Eleta Airport.
