= Survivor: Pearl Islands =

Season of television series

- Season 7
- Region 1 DVD cover
- Presented by: Jeff Probst
- No. of days: 39
- No. of castaways: 16
- Winner: Sandra Diaz-Twine
- Runner-up: Lillian Morris
- Location: Isla Del Rey, Pearl Islands, Panama
- No. of episodes: 15

Release
- Original network: CBS
- Original release: September 18 – December 14, 2003

Additional information
- Filming dates: June 23 – July 31, 2003

Season chronology
- ← Previous; The Amazon Next → All-Stars

Survivor: Pearl Islands (also broadcast as Survivor: Pearl Islands — Panama) is the seventh season of the American CBS competitive reality television series Survivor. It was filmed from June 23, 2003, through July 31, 2003, and premiered on September 18, 2003. The season was filmed on the Pearl Islands, off the coast of Panama, and had a pirate culture theme. Hosted by Jeff Probst, it consisted of the usual 39 days of gameplay with 16 competitors. Office clerk Sandra Diaz-Twine defeated scoutmaster Lillian Morris in a 6–1 jury vote.

== Format ==
Survivor is a reality television show created by Mark Burnett and Charlie Parsons and based on the Swedish show Expedition Robinson. The series follows a number of participants who are isolated in a remote location, where they must provide food, fire, and shelter for themselves. Every three days, one participant is removed from the series by majority vote, with challenges being held to give a reward (ranging from living and food-related prizes to a car) and immunity from being voted off the show. The last remaining player is awarded a prize of $1,000,000.

== Contestants ==
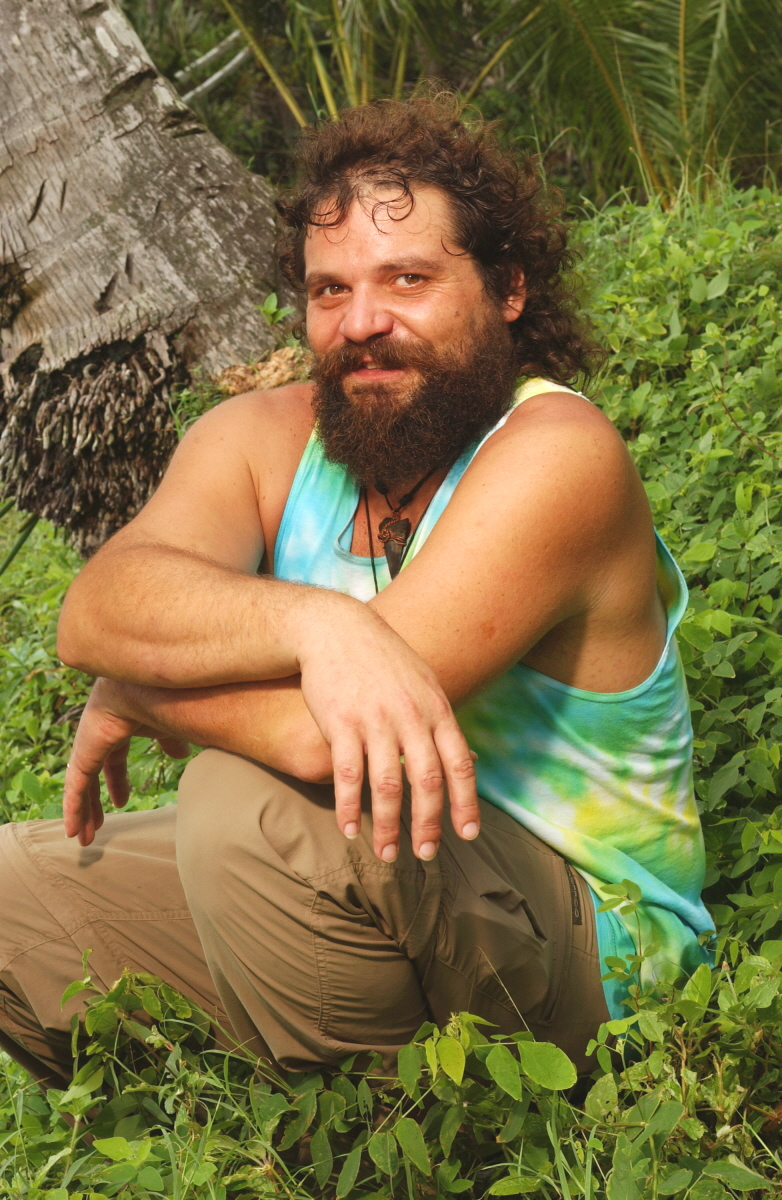
Rupert Boneham

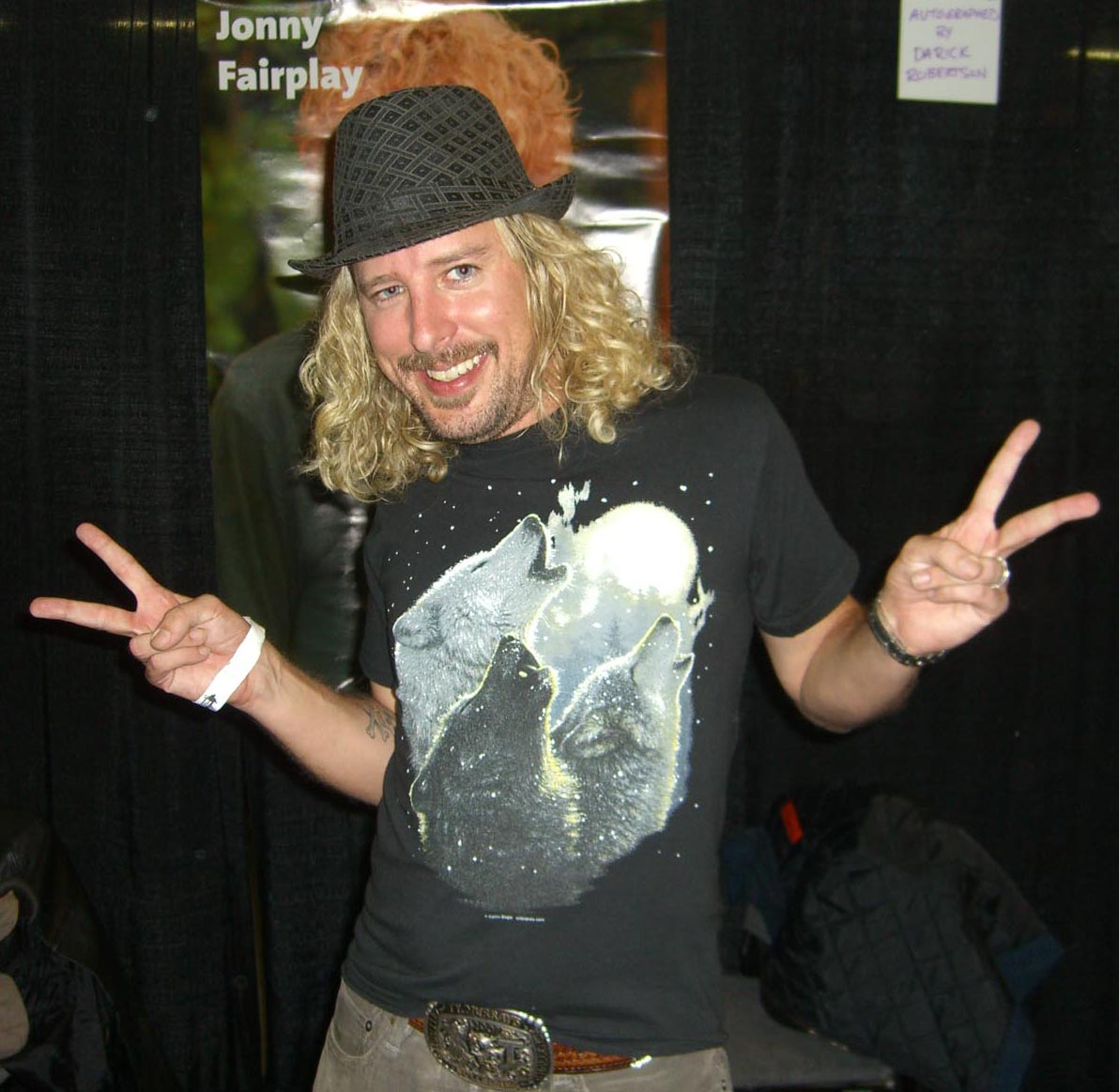
Jon "Jonny Fairplay" Dalton

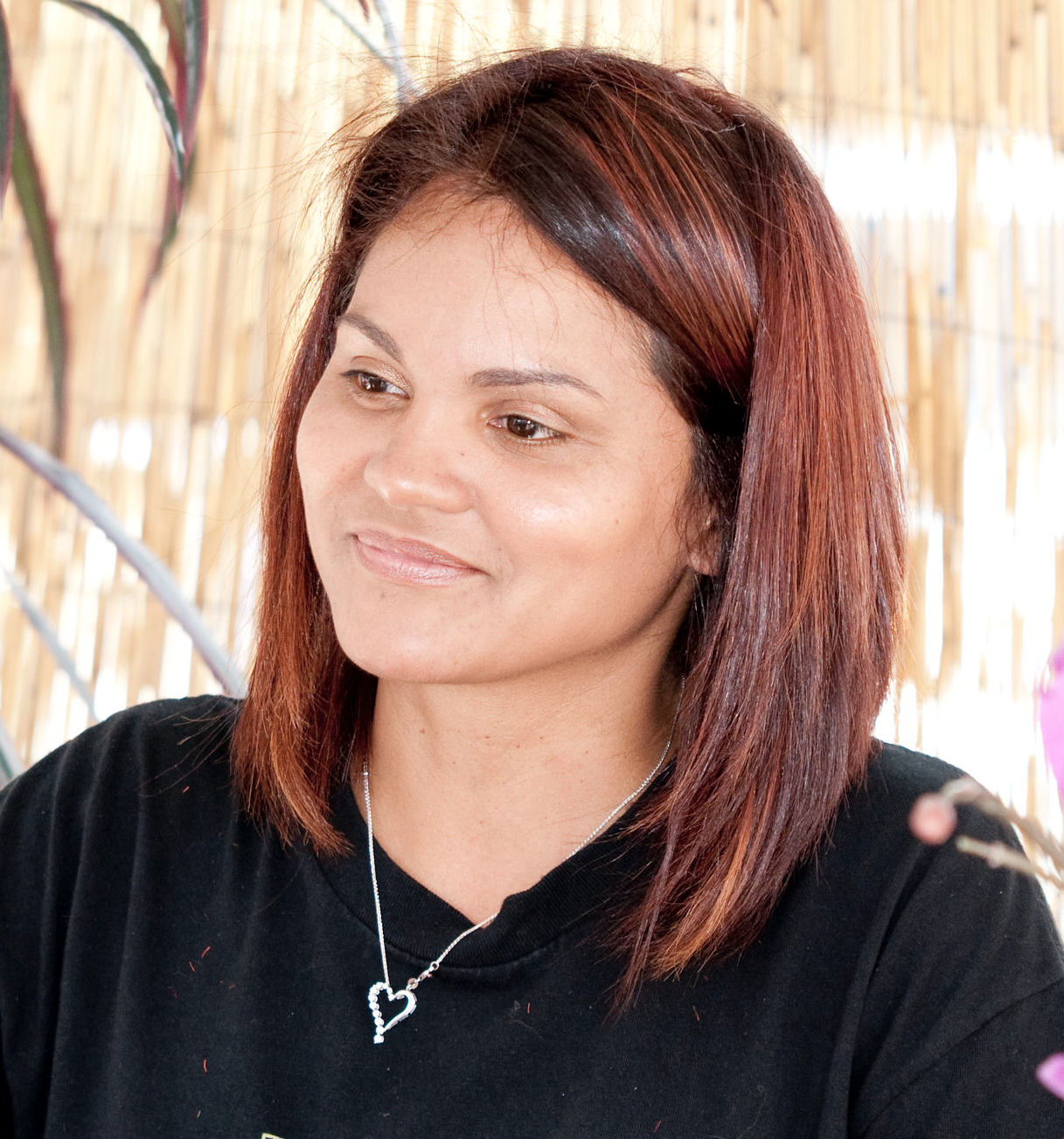
Sandra Diaz-Twine

The sixteen players were split into two original tribes, Drake and Morgan, named after English explorer Sir Francis Drake and Welsh explorer Henry Morgan respectively. With ten contestants remaining, the two were merged into the Balboa tribe, named after an injured snake found by contestant Rupert Boneham.

List of Survivor: Pearl Islands contestants
Contestant	Age	From	Tribe			Finish	
Contestant	Age	From	Original	Outcasts	Merged	Placement	Day
Nicole Delma	24	Hermosa Beach, California	Morgan	Outcasts		1st voted out	Day 3
Ryan Shoulders	23	Clarksville, Tennessee	Morgan	Outcasts		2nd voted out	Day 6
Lillian Morris (Returned to game)			Morgan	Outcasts		3rd voted out	Day 9
Burton Roberts (Returned to game)			Drake	Outcasts		4th voted out	Day 12
Michelle Tesauro	22	Washington, D.C.	Drake	Outcasts		5th voted out	Day 15
Trish Dunn	42	Annapolis, Maryland	Drake	Outcasts		6th voted out	Day 18
Shawn Cohen	28	Hollywood, California	Drake			7th voted out	Day 19
Osten Taylor	27	Boston, Massachusetts	Morgan			Quit	Day 19
Andrew Savage	39	Chicago, Illinois	Morgan		Balboa	8th voted out	Day 21
Ryan Opray	30	Los Gatos, California	Morgan		Balboa	9th voted out 1st jury member	Day 24
Rupert Boneham	39	Indianapolis, Indiana	Drake		Balboa	10th voted out 2nd jury member	Day 27
Tijuana Bradley	26	St. Louis, Missouri	Morgan		Balboa	11th voted out 3rd jury member	Day 30
Christa Hastie	24	Los Angeles, California	Drake		Balboa	12th voted out 4th jury member	Day 33
Burton Roberts	31	San Francisco, California	Drake	Outcasts	Balboa	13th voted out 5th jury member	Day 36
Burton Roberts	31	San Francisco, California	Drake	Drake (Note: On day 19, Burton and Lillian were voted back into the game as part of the Outcast twist. They briefly returned to their original tribes before merging the day after.)	Balboa	13th voted out 5th jury member	Day 36
Darrah Johnson	22	Liberty, Mississippi	Morgan		Balboa	14th voted out 6th jury member	Day 37
Jon Dalton	29	Los Angeles, California	Drake		Balboa	15th voted out 7th jury member	Day 38
Lillian Morris	51	Loveland, Ohio	Morgan	Outcasts	Balboa	Runner-up	Day 39
Lillian Morris	51	Loveland, Ohio	Morgan	Morgan	Balboa	Runner-up	Day 39
Sandra Diaz-Twine	29	Fort Lewis, Washington	Drake		Balboa	Sole Survivor	Day 39

=== Future appearances ===
Rupert Boneham returned for Survivor: All-Stars, Survivor: Heroes vs. Villains, and Survivor: Blood vs. Water with his wife, Laura. Boneham also appeared as a special guest on the third season of the Israeli production of Survivor. Jonny Fairplay returned for Survivor: Micronesia. Sandra Diaz-Twine later returned on Survivor: Heroes vs. Villains, Survivor: Game Changers, and Survivor: Winners at War, as well as on Survivor: Island of the Idols to serve as a mentor alongside Rob Mariano. Diaz-Twine also competed on Australian Survivor: Blood V Water with her daughter Nina. Andrew Savage returned for Survivor: Cambodia.

Outside of Survivor, Dalton competed with Survivor: Vanuatu castaway Twila Tanner on a Reality Star episode of Fear Factor in 2006. He later competed on the first season of House of Villains. In 2019, Boneham competed on The Amazing Race 31 with his wife Laura. Ryan Opray competed with Survivor: South Pacific castaway Mikayla Wingle on the Amazon Prime Video series World's Toughest Race: Eco-Challenge Fiji as part of Team Peak Traverse. In 2024, Diaz-Twine competed on the second season of The Traitors. In 2025, Sandra Diaz-Twine competed on 99 to Beat. In 2026, Diaz-Twine also competed on the second season of Extracted.

== Season summary ==
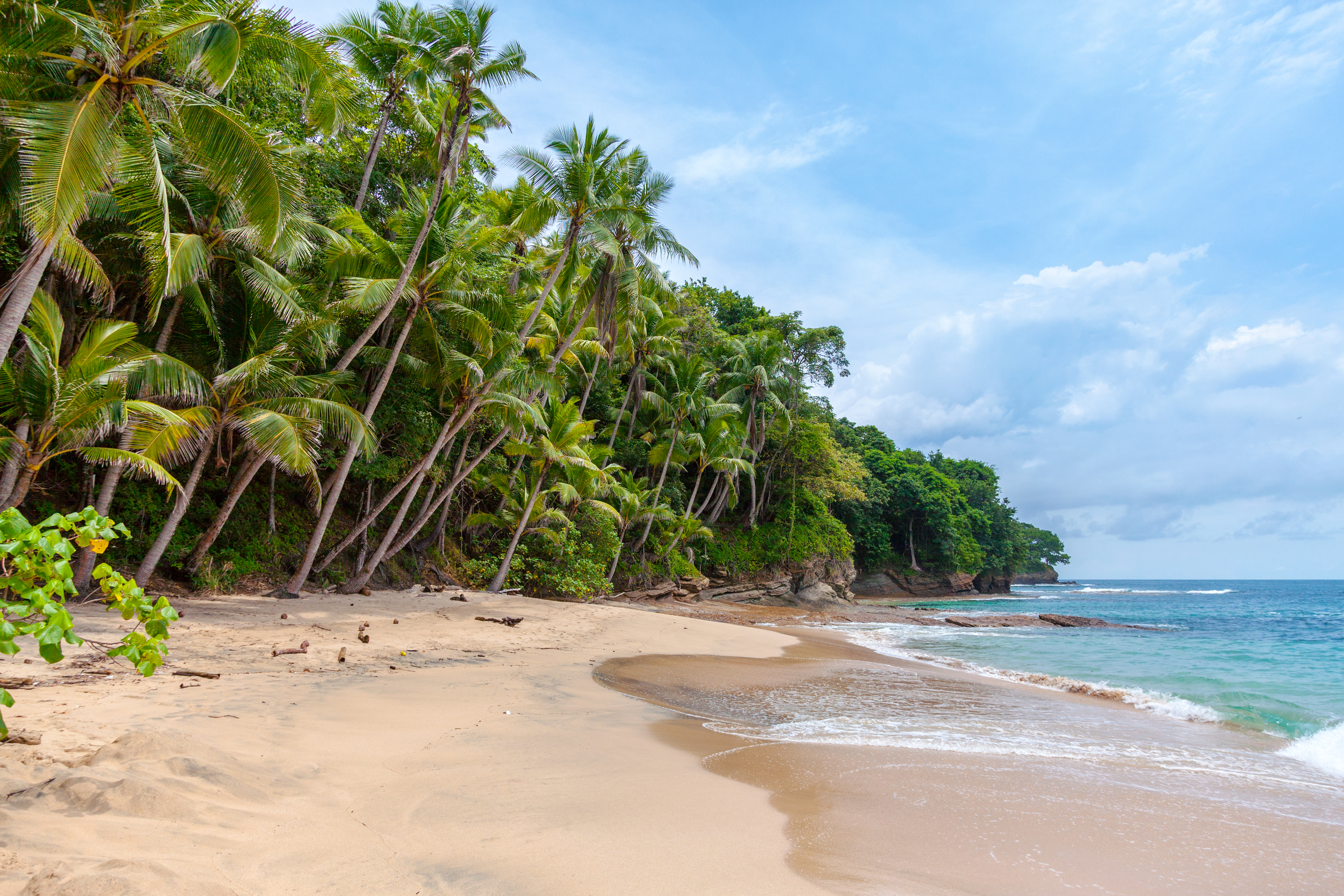
The season was filmed in the Pearl Islands in Panama.

The start of the game was announced as a surprise to the contestants, most of whom believed that they were on their way to a photo shoot. After being told they would begin the game with only the clothes on their back, they were divided into two tribes of eight, Morgan and Drake, and were given some money and sent to a small village to barter and buy supplies for their camps in lieu of being given them as in seasons past. Drake, thanks to Sandra's ability to speak Spanish and Rupert stealing the other tribe's abandoned shoes to barter, was able to acquire better supplies than Morgan, and thus went on an early winning streak, dwindling Morgan to five members.

Despite Drake's winning streak, member Burton conspired to throw an immunity challenge to eliminate a weaker player. The reluctant Drake tribe threw the challenge, but Burton was voted off for his cunning. This resulted in a major shift: Morgan, led by Andrew, experienced a renewal, and Drake began to splinter due to fighting between de facto leader Rupert and the conniving Jon. Morgan's newfound momentum led them to win the next two immunity challenges, leaving both tribes with five players each.

Upon arrival at their next challenge, the tribes were surprised by the "Outcast" tribe, consisting of the six eliminated players competing against the remaining players for a chance to return to the game. The Outcasts beat both Morgan and Drake in the challenge, forcing them both to go to Tribal Council and resulting in two of the Outcasts returning to the game. Former Drake member Burton and former Morgan castaway Lillian returned to the game, and joined the eight other castaways in forming the merged Balboa tribe. While Burton made up with his former tribe, Lillian's return was resented by the Morgan members. Lillian enacted revenge against her former tribemates, siding with the Drake alliance to eliminate Andrew.

While the Drake alliance had the upper hand, Jon, Burton, and Lillian decided that Rupert, as the strongest member of the Drake alliance, was an immunity threat, and worked with the remaining Morgan members to blindside him from the game. The three navigated between the Drake and Morgan factions to take out members of both sides, until they were the dominant alliance with only five players remaining. Lillian was swayed by Darrah and Sandra to break up the duo of Jon and Burton, and Burton was voted out for a second time. In another twist, the first five jurors were able to compete for immunity with four players remaining. They subsequently won the competition, thus leaving no one immune; challenge threat Darrah was then eliminated.

In the final immunity challenge, Lillian beat Jon and Sandra to secure a space in the final Tribal Council. Knowing that she would likely lose for having already been voted out of the game, she chose to take Sandra to the end for she felt Sandra deserved the victory more than Jon. The jury awarded Sandra the title of Sole Survivor over Lillian in a 6–1 vote.

Challenge winners and eliminations by episode
Episode			Challenge winner(s)		Eliminated	
No.	Title	Original air date	Reward	Immunity	Tribe	Player
1	"Beg, Barter, Steal"	September 18, 2003	None	Drake	Morgan	Nicole
2	"To Quit or Not to Quit"	September 25, 2003	Drake	Drake	Morgan	Ryan S.
3	"United We Stand, Divided We...?"	October 2, 2003	Drake	Drake	Morgan	Lillian
4	"Pick a Castaway...Any Castaway"	October 9, 2003	Drake	Morgan	Drake	Burton
4	"Pick a Castaway...Any Castaway"	October 9, 2003	Drake	Rupert (Note: Rupert was "kidnapped" by Morgan, granting him exemption from the following Tribal Council.)	Drake	Burton
5	"Everyone's Hero"	October 16, 2003	Morgan	Morgan	Drake	Michelle
6	"Me and My Snake"	October 23, 2003	Drake	Morgan	Drake	Trish
7	"What the...?, Part 1"	October 30, 2003	None	Outcasts (Note: Both tribes lost a challenge to the Outcasts; as a result, both tribes had to vote out a player, while the Outcasts voted two of their own back into the game.)	Drake	Shawn
7	"What the...?, Part 1"	October 30, 2003	None	Outcasts	Morgan	Osten
8	"What the...?, Part 2"	November 6, 2003	None (Note: There was no reward challenge due to the merge.)	Burton (Note: As part of their return to the game, Burton and Lillian were given immunity at their next Tribal Council. Burton won the subsequent immunity challenge, and chose to give the challenge immunity to Rupert.)	Balboa	Andrew
8	"What the...?, Part 2"	November 6, 2003	None	Lillian	Balboa	Andrew
8	"What the...?, Part 2"	November 6, 2003	None	~~Burton~~ (Rupert)	Balboa	Andrew
9	"Shocking! Simply Shocking!"	November 13, 2003	~~Rupert~~ (Note: Rupert chose to give his reward to Burton.) (Burton) [Lillian]	Rupert	Balboa	Ryan O.
10	"Swimming With Sharks"	November 20, 2003	~~Burton~~ (Note: Burton chose to give his reward to Jon.) (Jon), Lillian	Burton	Balboa	Rupert
11	"The Great Lie"	November 26, 2003	Jon	Darrah (Note: Burton was initially awarded immunity, but it was rescinded after Jeff Probst realized that Burton had spelled a word incorrectly, thus eliminating him from the challenge. A runoff between the non-eliminated castaways was conducted, with Darrah winning.)	Balboa	Tijuana
12	"Would You Be My Brutus Today?"	December 4, 2003	Darrah, Jon, Lillian	Darrah	Balboa	Christa
13	"Mutiny"	December 11, 2003	Burton [Jon]	Darrah	Balboa	Burton
14	"Flames and Endurance"	December 14, 2003	None	The Jury (Note: The jury was allowed to collectively compete against the four remaining castaways competing individually; the jury won the challenge, leaving all four remaining players without immunity.)	Balboa	Darrah
14	"Flames and Endurance"	December 14, 2003	None	Lillian	Balboa	Jon
15	"Reunion"	December 14, 2003				

In the case of multiple tribes or castaways who win reward or immunity, they are listed in order of finish, or alphabetically where it was a team effort; where one castaway won and invited others, the invitees are in brackets.

== Episodes ==
No. overall	No. in season	Title	CBS recap	Original release date	U.S. viewers (millions)	Rating/share (18-49)
91	1	"Beg, Barter, Steal"	Recap	September 18, 2003	21.50	8.4/23
The sixteen contestants arrived at the Pearl Islands onboard the luxury yacht, Rembrandt Van Rijn, still dressed in their street clothes. The contestants were shocked when they were told that they would be participating in the clothes on their backs, most believing they were getting publicity pictures prior to the game. Host Jeff Probst threw the contestants' sneakers overboard, and they were given a sack of Panamanian currency. The two tribes, Morgan and Drake, were sent to buy surviving essentials at a local village. When they reached the village, Morgan was scrambling to get supplies, while Drake was more successful, as Sandra was able to speak Spanish with the locals. Morgan had left their shoes unattended, so Rupert took the opportunity to steal their shoes so he could buy goods for his tribe. Meanwhile, Morgan member Osten traded all of his clothing, except for his boxers to buy goods for his tribe. After they were finished buying goods, the tribes got on their marine vessels and traveled to their respective islands. On night 1, Morgan had trouble sleeping, as rocks were falling from above, and crabs were biting the members. Meanwhile, Drake decided to celebrate their new home by drinking Panamanian wine, which they had bought at the village. Jon became incredibly drunk, which annoyed his tribemates. When morning came, the dehydrated Morgan tribe was relieved to find directions to a freshwater well on their map. At the well, Lillian and Ryan S. bonded while filling their canteens.: Immunity challenge: Each tribe must transport a cannon through the jungle along a course that runs from one side of the island to the other. Along the course, the castaways must avoid several obstacles. The first tribe to bring their cannon to the finish line wins immunity.; At the immunity challenge, Osten took off his boxers, which had been loose due to the weight he had lost. Other male members of Morgan also stripped naked. Morgan had a lead, however just before the finish line, their cannon got stuck in the sand, causing Drake to pull ahead and win the challenge. After they had lost, the Morgan tribe was upset, but Andrew tried to cheer his tribe up by giving them a pep talk. Lillian was at risk of possibly being voted out because she was the oldest woman, and therefore considered to be potentially a liability at future challenges, and Nicole wanted to oust Tijuana, but when Lillian told Tijuana of Nicole's plan, Tijuana decided she couldn't trust her. In the end, Lillian saved herself and the vote went against Nicole.
92	2	"To Quit or Not to Quit"	Recap	September 25, 2003	19.86	7.5/21
The Morgan tribe had trouble sleeping as the cold nights had taken their toll on the contestants. Over at Drake, Rupert caught fish for his tribe. After receiving tree mail about the upcoming reward challenge, Ryan S. felt that he was under a lot of pressure to do well in the challenge.: Reward challenge: Each tribe has a designated treasure chest underwater. Each player must dive into the ocean to retrieve a pre-placed item and put it into their tribe's treasure chest. Once all the items are in the chest, the contestants, as a tribe, must grab the chest and swim it to the shore. First tribe to bring their chest to the shore wins reward. For the reward, both tribes were given a shovel. Probst explained that there is an actual treasure buried at each camp. The winning tribe would be given the first of three pieces to a map that will help them find the treasure. In addition, the winning tribe would have to send one member to the losing tribe's camp to take an item of their choosing back to their camp.; As Ryan S. started swimming during the challenge, he had trouble with his mask as well as staying underwater giving Drake an early lead. Morgan never recovered, giving Drake their second win in a row. In a twist, the winning tribe, Drake, had to send one member to the Morgan camp to take one of their items back with them. Drake sent Sandra, who chose to take Morgan's tarp. Morgan was sullen around Sandra and after they snapped at her for taking the tarp and asking them to help so she didn't damage their shelter doing so, Sandra simply tore the tarp down and left the shelter in bad shape, ignoring Morgan's whining and leaving without any pleasantries. While trying to rebuild their shelter, Osten announced that he was considering quitting the game, which upset Andrew. Meanwhile, at Drake, Shawn went fishing and lost the head of his tribe's fishing spear, which upset Rupert. Rupert searched underwater for the lost head, and wound up finding it.: Immunity challenge: Each tribe would capture three members of the opposing tribe. The other castaways must try to free their captured tribemates, and then overcome a series of obstacles in order to raise their flag. First tribe to raise their flag wins immunity.; Once again, Morgan lost the immunity challenge. Osten surprised his tribemates by asking to be voted off, which disappointed Tijuana. In the end, Osten did not get his wish, as the majority alliance valued Osten more than the physically weak Ryan S. and sent him home.
93	3	"United We Stand, Divided We...?"	Recap	October 2, 2003	19.68	7.5/21
The Morgan tribe quietly thought about their misfortunes. The Drake tribe decided to look for their buried treasure. They had guessed that it would be along the shoreline, therefore it would only be accessible during the low tide. However, the Drake tribe did not succeed in finding the treasure, so they decided to take a break and check another time.: Reward challenge: Each tribe was given two boats and a fisherman's grappling hook. They must try to sink both of the opposite tribe's boats. The hooks could be used to remove plugs that covered holes along the sides of each boat. The last tribe still floating wins blankets, mattresses, pillows, and a piece of the map to the buried treasure.; Jon wanted Sandra to sit out at the reward challenge, as he thought she was a weak swimmer, which angered Sandra. Once again, Drake ended up winning the reward challenge, which left Morgan distraught. The next morning, Lillian woke up early to go on a fishing trip and lost the tribe's fishing hook. Meanwhile, Drake decided not to look for the treasure, so they discussed what item they should take from the Morgan camp. They decided they should take Morgan's water pot. Christa was sent to the Morgan camp to take the pot. When Christa arrived at Morgan's camp, the Morgan tribe asked many questions about Drake. Christa tried not to reveal too much about her tribe, which she found difficult.: Immunity challenge: The strongest member of each tribe must suspend the smallest member above the ocean using a rope-and-pulley system. The first person to drop the rope and their suspended tribemate would lose immunity.; At the immunity challenge, it came down to Morgan's Osten, and Drake's Rupert. Probst decided to add difficulty to the challenge by forcing Osten and Rupert to stand, and then he forbade them to rest the rope on the wooden braces in front of them. Osten couldn't hold the rope any longer, giving Drake immunity for the third consecutive time. At Morgan, Andrew had decided Lillian was the least valuable tribe member, and took pains to let Lillian know that she should generally be OK with losing her spot in the game because it would benefit the people who were voting her out. Andrew spoke with Lillian to let her know that she was on the chopping block but apparently didn't honor her request to be explicitly told her time was up before Tribal Council. Lillian became the third person voted out.
94	4	"Pick a Castaway...Any Castaway"	Recap	October 9, 2003	20.00	7.6/20
The Morgan tribe was at risk of losing their shelter due to the rising tide, and built a breaker wall out of sand to try to protect it. Meanwhile, having never voted anyone off, there was some tension at Drake due to clashing personalities.: Reward challenge: Each tribe must retrieve sixteen puzzle pieces; eight buried in the sand and eight hidden out at sea. The tribes must collect all sixteen pieces in order to solve a puzzle. First tribe to solve their giant puzzle wins a sewing kit and a piece of the map to the buried treasure.; At the reward challenge, Morgan fell behind as Osten had trouble swimming, giving Drake a lead. However Drake member Trish had trouble digging out one of Drake's pieces, allowing Morgan to make a comeback. However, Drake solved their puzzle just before Morgan could, giving Drake yet another win, and the final piece to their treasure map. With all three pieces, Drake had a good idea where to look for the treasure. They got somewhat confused when they had to find a spot on the map called "Devil's Fork". Drake was overcome with joy when Shawn hit the treasure chest with the shovel. The tribe gathered to see what the chest contained. Inside, there were goblets, candles, candleholders, canned foods, sugar, honey, blankets, coffee beans, and chocolate. Over at Morgan, Andrew and Ryan O. went to the other side of the island to fish, however they came back with no fish. The Drake tribe sent Trish to the Morgan camp, who Morgan greeted. Trish decided to take Morgan's lantern. Over at Drake, Burton proposed to Rupert that they throw the next immunity challenge to get rid of one of the weaker women, to which Rupert agreed.: Immunity challenge: Each castaway must cross a human checkerboard over water. When a castaway is face-to-face with an opposing tribe member, a hand-to-hand clash would occur. Whichever castaway loses balance first will have to start over. First tribe to get all of their members across wins immunity. In addition, the winning tribe will have the right to kidnap a member of the opposing tribe.; At the immunity challenge, Drake sat out two of their strongest players, Burton and Rupert, to increase the chances of Morgan winning the challenge. Morgan won their first challenge, sending Drake to Tribal Council for the first time. After Morgan won, Probst announced that they had the right to kidnap one member of Drake; they chose Rupert. At Drake, many alliances scrambled, with Jon as a swing vote. Jon showed up drunk to Tribal Council and awkwardly answered hostile questions from Jeff Probst. In the end, the vote went against Burton, who was blindsided by a secret alliance that included his closest friend, Shawn.
95	5	"Everyone's Hero"	Recap	October 16, 2003	19.35	7.4/20
With Rupert still at their camp, the Morgan tribe moved their shelter to avoid the rising tide. Meanwhile, Drake decided to save their last can of spam for Rupert upon his return. Some Drake members were worried that Rupert may have given too much information to the Morgan tribe.: Reward challenge: Each tribe must retrieve rungs for a ladder from the water. In addition, they must retrieve a golden idol hidden in an old Spanish well in the jungle. First tribe to assemble their ladder and place the golden idol at the top of their platform wins a portable shower, a pot for boiling water, two jerrycans, rain jackets, sponges, shampoo and conditioner.; At the reward challenge, Drake fell behind as they lost control of their boat due to Jon's faulty navigating. Morgan found their golden idol and quickly assembled their ladder, winning their first reward challenge. After Morgan won, Rupert was offered a chance to return to the Morgan camp to enjoy a shower, however Rupert decided to return to his Drake camp. Winning the challenge, Morgan had to send one member to the Drake camp to take one item. They chose Andrew, who took a bag of rice from Drake. When Drake got tree mail inviting them to an immunity challenge that likely involved eating exotic seafood, they decided to strategize. Michelle claimed to have a high tolerance for eating undesirable foods, so Drake decided to use her as a decoy. Their plan was that Michelle would pretend to have trouble downing the food in order to fool Morgan into competing with her in the event of a tiebreaker.: Immunity challenge: Each castaway must spin a wheel, which will determine which two ingredients would be blended together for them to drink. The ingredients were red shellfish, sardines, razor clams, bleeding clams, sea water, squid, mango, rock oysters, conch, octopus, coconut juice, and an ingredient of Jeff's choice. The first person unable to keep their concoction down will lose immunity for their whole tribe.; The immunity challenge initially resulted in a tie, with all contestants managing to swallow the concoctions. However, when it was time for Morgan to choose a Drake member, they chose Sandra and not Michelle. Sandra was able to drink her concoction, however she had trouble swallowing the sardine, allowing Morgan's Darrah to win immunity for her tribe. Sandra and Michelle both felt vulnerable. Jon was upset at Michelle for not pretending to have trouble drinking the concoction, and she was ultimately unanimously eliminated.
96	6	"Me and My Snake"	Recap	October 23, 2003	20.19	7.5/20
Rupert was upset when an injured baby snake he named Balboa died overnight. A local pelican nicknamed "Pelican Pete" came to the Morgan camp; Osten feared the pelican and threatened it with a machete, amusing his tribemates. After Rupert suggested that they raise the floor of the Drake shelter, the Drake tribe got to work. Jon and Sandra were annoyed at Shawn due to his complaining.: Reward challenge: Each tribe must fire a cannon and try to hit designated targets. First tribe to hit all of their designated targets wins a grill, spices, lobsters, and steak. Should Morgan win, they would receive their second piece of the map to their treasure.; At the reward challenge, it was a very close competition. It came down to Andrew from Morgan and Christa from Drake. Andrew missed his target, allowing Christa to hit her target. Christa was successful, winning reward for Drake. The Drake barbecued their steaks, and enjoyed their feast. Jon was sent to the Morgan camp to take an item. Jon took their water pot and enjoyed shampoo. While at Morgan, Jon revealed that Drake had thrown one of the immunity challenges, which irritated Andrew.: Immunity challenge: Tribe members would hold a pole on their shoulders behind their neck. Periodically, weight would be added to the poles. The castaways would decide which poles the weight would added on for the opposing tribe. Last tribe standing wins immunity.; At the immunity challenge, Morgan chose to add all of the weight to Rupert's pole, while Drake decided to spread the weight evenly among the Morgan tribe. Morgan's strategy worked, as Rupert could not hold the weight. In the end, Christa couldn't compete against that last two Morgan men left, giving Morgan yet another immunity win. After losing immunity, Trish wanted to oust Rupert as she saw him as a threat. Her alliance needed Shawn to complete the plan. But Christa caught the exchange and she and Sandra told Rupert about the plan, and they started a secret alliance of their own. In the end, Shawn flipped and Trish's plan backfired as she was voted off.
97	7	"What the...?, Part 1"	Recap	October 30, 2003	20.70	7.8/21
While returning to camp from Tribal Council, Rupert was enraged at Jon as Rupert had suspected that Jon had voted for him. Jon admitted to voting for Rupert, and the two apologized for the good of their tribe. Over at Morgan, the rainy weather prevented the hungry tribe members from fishing. They were eating their diminishing supply of rice and beans. When the contestants arrived at the challenge, they were shocked to see the castaways they had previously voted off return as a ghost tribe, the Outcasts. The immunity challenge would be between three tribes, the first one in Survivor history.: Immunity challenge: Each castaway except for one designated "rescuer" from each tribe will be prisoners in a set of cages. The rescuer must free all of their tribemates. First tribe to free all of their prisoners and cross the finish line with their flag wins.; Additional stipulation: Drake and Morgan are competing against the Outcasts, rather than each other. Any tribe that finishes behind the Outcasts must go to Tribal Council and vote out a member. The Outcasts will then hold a special Tribal Council in which they will vote members back into the game, enough to replace each person that just left. Those returning will be given automatic immunity for the next Tribal Council. If the Outcasts finish last, Drake and Morgan will be safe, and all six Outcasts leave the game permanently.; Morgan fell behind in the challenge as Drake took the lead, with the Outcasts not far behind. In the end, the Outcasts managed to unlock the last door, cross the finish line, and win the challenge, sending both Morgan and Drake to Tribal Council. After the challenge, Morgan was upset that they would have to let one of the Outcasts back into their tribe, as Andrew's blustering about immediately voting out any returning Outcast was snuffed when Tijuana reminded him that said returnee would be immune from their first vote back on a new tribe. Osten asked his tribemates to vote him off. Over at Drake, Jon and Shawn were both on the chopping block. The tribe decided to let the two make their case as to why they should stay. Shawn spoke of trust, while Jon spoke of work ethic. In the end, work ethic proved to be more important as Shawn was voted out. Soon after, at the Morgan Tribal Council, Osten decided to take the opportunity to quit the game, to the lengthy and pointed disgust of Jeff Probst. For the first time, voting was done verbally and was unanimous, as Osten's torch was snuffed and put to rest on the ground for the remainder of the season. In addition, because his reasons for quitting were deemed insufficient, he did not get a closing speech; instead, all viewers saw was footage of the Morgan tribe departing Tribal Council and ending with a final shot of his laid-down torch.
98	8	"What the...?, Part 2"	Recap	November 6, 2003	21.30	8.1/21
The Outcasts, a tribe consisting of the first six departed castaways, had to vote two people back into the game. At the Outcasts' Tribal Council, each Outcast made their plea as to why they should be voted back into the game. It was decided, in a 3–3–2–2–1–1 vote, that Burton and Lillian would return to represent the Outcasts. After randomly selecting who would go to which tribe, Burton returned to Drake and Lillian returned to Morgan. When Burton returned to Drake, his tribe apologized, and were happy to have him back. When Lillian returned to Morgan, she was welcomed by her old tribe, but she wasn't remotely appeased by the general niceness of everyone but Andrew, and Andrew stupidly complained to Lillian at length about how he hated the Outcast twist and felt it should never have happened. Over at Drake, Burton, Christa, and Rupert made an alliance to vote out Jon at their next Tribal Council. They thought that Jon's lack of honesty could work against them once the tribes merge. When the two tribes arrived at what they thought would be a reward challenge, Probst announced that the tribes were merging and it was decided that Drake's camp would be better to live in.: Immunity challenge: Each castaway must pull themselves along a rope under a floating wood platform without coming up for air. The challenge ran in two heats. The two winners of each heat would compete against each other in the final heat. The winner of the final heat wins individual immunity.; After the announcement of the merge, the first individual immunity challenge took place, in which Burton won narrowly over Rupert. When the castaways arrived at camp, they named the merged tribe "Balboa" after Rupert's pet snake. The hungry castaways then saw a merge feast ready for them. Having been voted out of Morgan and then returned, Lillian was the potential swing vote for the next Tribal Council. Andrew begged her to rejoin the Morgans and vote out a Drake member, but Lillian had already made plans to vote with the Drakes and left Andrew speechless when she coldly told him that he'd previously screwed her over and blindsided her, making it plain she was not interested in anything he had to say. At Tribal Council, Burton decided to give the immunity necklace to Rupert, since he was already immune due to the Outcast twist. In the end, Lillian joined the former Drake members to pay revenge to Andrew, who was eliminated in a 6–4 decision against Jon.
99	9	"Shocking! Simply Shocking!"	Recap	November 13, 2003	22.10	8.3/21
As morning came, Lillian got up early and celebrated her renewed life in the game by being the first to get to work. After his strongest ally was ousted, Ryan O. feared that he was on the chopping block. While fishing, Ryan O. tried to align himself with Burton to oust former Drake members Christa, Rupert, and Sandra. When Burton returned from fishing, he returned with an electric ray, although he still wanted to cook it and enjoy the meat.: Reward challenge: The challenge was done in three heats. Each castaway would use a slingshot to fire marbles at targets. Whenever a target is hit, it will ignite a flame that would climb to the next target. The first person from each heat to hit their three targets in ascending order would move on to the final round. The first person in the final round to hit their three targets wins pancakes and maple syrup, bacon and eggs, sweet rolls, orange juice to enjoyed in a remote, attractive location.; At the reward challenge, Ryan O. won the first heat, Rupert won the second, and Lillian won the third. Rupert won the final round. Rupert decided to give his reward to Burton, who took Lillian along with him. While Burton and Lillian were having breakfast, Burton brought up a plan to eliminate Rupert as soon as possible. The plan was for Lillian to eliminate Rupert by creating an alliance with Darrah and Tijuana, while lying to Christa and Rupert. At camp, Sandra and Christa contemplated eliminating Rupert and Burton.: Immunity challenge: The immunity challenge involved a trivia test based on local pirate lore. Each castaway who answers correctly would get to place coconuts in the bins of those who answered incorrectly. When a castaway receives five coconuts, they are out of the challenge. Last castaway standing wins immunity.; At the immunity challenge, Ryan O. was quickly eliminated. The challenge's final two were Rupert and Christa. Rupert answered the final question correctly and placed the fifth coconut into Christa's bin, winning immunity. Knowing that he could be next to go, Ryan O. tried to create alliances with Burton, then Tijuana and Darrah. Rupert was worried that Ryan O. could be successful. In the end, Rupert's fears were for naught as Ryan O. was unanimously sent to the jury.
100	10	"Swimming with Sharks"	Recap	November 20, 2003	19.90	7.0/19
Jon was annoyed at the arrogance from the Christa, Rupert, and Sandra alliance. Jon and Burton made a plan to break that alliance, as both players knew that their only real chance to win the game was face off with each other in an all-Outcast final two. They planned to align with Darrah and Tijuana. While Rupert was fishing and Christa and Sandra were getting lemons, Jon and Burton made efforts to align with Darrah and Tijuana. The two women agreed to align with Jon and Burton.: Reward challenge: The challenge took place at the wreck of an old Spanish galleon. The castaways must team up in pairs to complete two rounds. Each pair must race up a cargo net, and then swing on a rope to the other side of the ship. Then they must climb up to a crow's nest and slide down a large canvas sail. The winning pairs would then play against each other, but to make it more difficult, they must carry bags of puzzle pieces that they must assemble at the end of the course. The pair to win the final round wins a trip on a luxury catamaran with pizza and beer.; At the reward challenge, it was a tight race between the team of Burton and Lillian and the team of Christa and Darrah. Darrah missed the rope that Christa tossed, allowing Burton and Lillian to advance to the final round. Meanwhile, over at the other round, Rupert and Jon had a lead over Tijuana and Sandra. In the end, despite Jon forgetting to ring the bell, Rupert and Jon won their round. The final round was between the team of Burton and Lillian and the team of Rupert and Jon. It was a tight race, however Burton and Lillian finished the puzzle first, winning reward. Burton decided to give his reward to Jon, while Lillian kept hers. Back at camp, Rupert's trust for Burton was dwindling after Burton chose to give his reward to Jon over Rupert. While Jon and Lillian enjoyed their reward, Jon told Lillian how she could convince Rupert, Christa, and Sandra that she was on their side, when in reality, she's actually aligned with Burton, Darrah, Jon, and Tijuana. When Lillian and Jon returned to camp, Rupert tried to align with Lillian. Lillian managed to convince Rupert that she was loyal to his alliance, when in reality she was aligned with Burton, Darrah, Jon, and Tijuana.: Immunity challenge: The castaways must use a blowgun. Each castaway was designated an area on a large target. The castaways must try to use their blowgun to knock out the other player's darts into the other castaways areas. Last player left in the challenge wins immunity.; At the immunity challenge, Rupert had an early lead. However, in the end, it came down to Burton, Jon, and Lillian. Burton ended up winning immunity. Back at camp, the alliance of Burton, Darrah, Jon, Lillian, and Tijuana pretended that Darrah was going to be next one to go, however Rupert didn't trust them fully. Still convinced that Lillian was on his side, Rupert thought that there would be a tie. At Tribal Council, Rupert was blindsided after Lillian voted against him, and he was sent to the jury.
101	11	"The Great Lie"	Recap	November 26, 2003	20.06	7.2/22
After Rupert was voted out, Sandra was furious at Jon for breaking their alliance. After Sandra's yelling, the Balboa tribe members noticed that someone had thrown away a bucket of fish Rupert had caught. Christa was blamed for it; however Sandra admitted in an interview that she had spilled the fish. At the reward challenge, the castaways were reunited with their loved ones. Before the challenge started, Jon was saddened to hear from his best friend Dan that his grandmother had died.: Reward challenge: Probst brought the castaways' loved ones to the challenge. The castaways would ask questions about themselves. Both the castaways and their loved ones would write down an answer. When the two answers matched, the castaway would get to choose which loved one to take a step towards walking off a plank, falling into the ocean. The last loved one left gets to stay at the Balboa camp for a day.; When the challenge started, Sandra chose Dan to take a step on the plank. Jon was upset, as he wanted to hear the details about his grandmother's death. Sandra's husband was the first loved one sent into the ocean, followed by Christa's fiancé, Darrah's boyfriend, Burton's mother, then Tijuana's friend. With Lillian's husband and Jon's friend left, Burton was the one who decided which one would jump off the plank. Feeling sorry for Jon, Burton sent Lillian's husband off the plank. When Jon won reward, he learned that he and his friend would share the camp on their own, with the other castaways banished to another beach without their loved ones. While Jon and his friend Dan were alone at the Balboa camp, the two of them revealed that the story about Jon's grandmother's death was pre-planned and that she was actually still alive, as Jon had decided to use this tactic to gain sympathy and any possible edge at a relatively late point in the game. Jon and Dan celebrated alone. When the rest of Balboa returned, Sandra and Christa attempted to get Tijuana to break her alliance with Burton, Jon, and Lillian. During the night, as Burton and Jon went away from camp to talk about strategy, Sandra called Tijuana to come with her and listen to Burton and Jon's strategic talk. Sandra did this to ensure there was no doubt about the alliance between Burton, Jon, and Lillian. Sandra and Tijuana returned before Jon and Burton, and Tijuana told Darrah what she heard.: Immunity challenge: Each castaway has a board with individual letter blocks spelling "SURVIVOR PEARL ISLANDS". Immunity will be earned by the first castaways to successfully use the letters to form twenty new, correctly spelled English words, excluding plurals, proper nouns, acronyms, and the original three words. Each contestant can submit their work only once, and is eliminated if their results are invalid.; Christa, Tijuana, and Jon were all eliminated for misspellings, and Burton then initially won immunity; however, Probst recalled the departing castaways and stripped Burton of immunity, announcing he had overlooked Burton's misspelling of "LIAISON" as "LIASON". As the contestants had already seen and discussed each others' results, remaining contestants Darrah, Lillian, and Sandra were given a new challenge: from the phrase "OUTWIT OUTPLAY OUTLAST", write as many words of four or more letters as possible in one minute. Darrah won. Jon and Burton were worried that they were on the chopping block as the women outnumbered the men. Knowing that women of the former Morgan tribe wanted Burton out, Jon tried to create an alliance with Sandra and Christa; however Sandra said she didn't trust Jon. In the end, Jon ended up convincing the former Drake tribe and Lillian to vote out Tijuana, and she became the third member of the jury.
102	12	"Would You Be My Brutus Today?"	Recap	December 4, 2003	22.20	8.1/22
After returning from Tribal Council in which Tijuana was voted out, Sandra and Christa had second thoughts about their alliance with Jon. They tried to break their alliance with him by attempting to align with Darrah.: Reward challenge: The castaways would compete in teams of three. Beginning on a platform in the water, one team member would cross a balance beam, then dive underwater to retrieve paddles tied to floating boxes. The other two must then untie three barrels from an underwater cable and move on to a ladder, where the last paddle is tied. All three team members would then jump into the water to retrieve their designated boat and then they would race the boat to the first floating platform. First team to touch the platform wins a night at a spa where the team would enjoy a shower and a massage followed by dinner.; The team of Darrah, Jon, and Lillian won the reward challenge. After returning from the reward, Jon and Burton discussed voting out Christa next due to her being aligned with Rupert previously.: Immunity challenge: Each castaway would use old muskets to shoot at designated targets covered with kerosene. First castaway to set all three of their targets ablaze wins immunity.; At the immunity challenge, Christa took an early lead even though she had no experience of using guns, however Darrah quickly tied with Christa when she hit two of her targets. Christa just missed her final target, allowing Darrah to hit her final target and win immunity for the second time in a row. After the immunity challenge, Lillian and Christa were both told that the other was going home. In the end, Christa was voted out and became the fourth member of the jury.
103	13	"Mutiny"	Recap	December 11, 2003	22.41	8.2/23
After voting out Christa, Jon and Burton decided they were going to betray Darrah for being an immunity threat, while Sandra tried to plot revenge after losing her last ally.: Reward challenge: Each castaway must untie themselves from a post, find a key buried in the sand, escape from a jail cell, fire a slingshot at plates, and then solve a puzzle. First castaway to complete the challenge wins a GMC Envoy along with a night in Panama City where the winner and an invitee would camp out in ruins and enjoy a feast.; Burton won the reward challenge and took Jon with him on the trip, which unfortunately for him and Jon allowed the women to openly discuss Burton and Jon's schemes. Lillian told Darrah that Jon and Burton wanted to betray her for being a physical threat, so Lillian, Darrah, and Sandra all decided to form an all-female final three alliance. The women decided to vote off Burton, or Jon if Burton wins immunity. The next day, Lillian expressed doubt over the plan to vote Burton or Jon out, and afraid that they would berate her for their betrayal. Sandra decided to feign sadness to stop the guys from realizing there was a plot against them. When Burton and Jon returned to camp, only Darrah and Lillian were there to welcome them. Darrah and Lillian told the guys that Sandra was ready to leave and didn't strategize to vote either of them out. Burton was sceptical about it and asked Lillian questions about if it was true, while Jon approached Sandra and then decided to make a deal that it won't be her next to go home and sticking with the plan to vote off Darrah at the next Tribal Council by making Sandra swear on her kids. In reality, Sandra mouthed to herself that she swore on her kids to get rid of Jon and Burton.: Immunity challenge: Each castaway must use a canteen to pour water in a tube that will lift a key to open a lock. The lock releases a rope, allowing the castaway to lower a plank into the water. First castaway to lower five planks and walk them wins immunity.; Darrah won immunity for the third consecutive time. Jon realized that Lillian was being withdrawn and questioned her loyalty. Jon told Burton that he thought that the women made a deal to get rid of Burton, so the two men tried to lobby Sandra and Darrah to vote out Lillian with them. In the end, the women stuck together to send Burton to the jury, making the first player in Survivor history be voted out twice in a single season.
104	14	"Flames and Endurance"	Recap	December 14, 2003	25.23	9.7/22
The final four was awakened by a motorboat to find host Jeff Probst with breakfast and champagne. After their meal, they were excited to see letters from home. Knowing that he was on the chopping block, Jon told Darrah that it would be a good strategic move to vote out Lillian because she was a threat to gain jury votes. Lillian convinced Sandra that Darrah should go because of her three straight immunity wins.: Immunity challenge: The challenge would be a test of survival and pirate folklore knowledge. In a twist, the final four castaways would be competing against each other and the jury, which will be playing as a team. Should the jury win, none of the final four castaways would be immune. Should one of the remaining castaways win, that castaway would be safe from elimination.; At the immunity challenge, the jury took an early lead, however Jon quickly tied the score. In the end, the jury answered the final question correctly, meaning that none of the remaining castaways were immune. At Tribal Council, Darrah was seen as a physical threat and she was voted out. After receiving tree mail at midnight, the final three got up early to paddle to a shipwreck. Jeff Probst told them that they were about to take part in the ceremony for fallen castaways. After all the torches of those voted out (Osten's was left at Tribal Council) were placed on the wreck, the final three shot muskets at the shipwreck and it erupted and burned to the ground.: Immunity challenge: The final three must balance themselves on a small raft floating in the water. They could use their hands and feet for balance, but not their behind or knees. Last castaway on their raft wins immunity and a guaranteed spot in the final two.; At the immunity challenge, Jon and Sandra felt uncomfortable, while Lillian felt fine. Sandra fell early. Jon tried to make a final two deal with Lillian, however she refused because she felt she could beat him without a deal. After over two hours, Jon lost his balance, guaranteeing Lillian a spot in the final two. After Lillian won the final immunity challenge, Jon and Sandra both lobbied Lillian to take them to the final two. Jon argued that he was widely hated by the jury and that taking him to the final two would guarantee Lillian a million dollars. Sandra told Lillian that she has a family she'd like to provide for. Lillian was still unsure of whom to take to the final two. After much consideration, Lillian decided to vote out Jon due to Sandra's motivation of providing for her family. At the final Tribal Council, Lillian talked about her honesty in her speech and admitted that it was a mistake to bring her Boy Scout uniform to the game, as most of the jury members were much harsher towards her than Sandra. Sandra talked about her work ethic and said that she didn't ride any coattails, not even Rupert's.
105	15	"Reunion"	N/A	December 14, 2003	26.19	9.2/21
Months later, the votes were revealed and it was announced Sandra beat out Lillian to become the Sole Survivor in a 6–1 vote, with Lillian only receiving Tijuana's vote (and that vote largely came when Sandra told Tijuana that Lillian was responsible for everyone's ouster to the jury and Tijuana decided that Lillian doing so made her an effective player who deserved her vote) and Sandra getting all the rest. The castaways discuss the season with host, Jeff Probst.

== Voting history ==
	Original tribes						Outcasts twist (Note: Both tribes lost a challenge to the Outcasts, composed of the first six departed players; as a result, both tribes had to vote out a player, while the Outcasts voted two of their own back into the game. Outcast players were not allowed to vote for themselves.)		Merged tribe							
Episode	1	2	3	4	5	6	7		8	9	10	11	12	13	14	
Day	3	6	9	12	15	18	19		21	24	27	30	33	36	37	38
Tribe	Morgan	Morgan	Morgan	Drake	Drake	Drake	Drake	Morgan	Balboa	Balboa	Balboa	Balboa	Balboa	Balboa	Balboa	Balboa
Eliminated	Nicole	Ryan S.	Lillian	Burton	Michelle	Trish	Shawn	Osten	Andrew	Ryan O.	Rupert	Tijuana	Christa	Burton	Darrah	Jon
Votes	7–1	5–2	5–1	5–2	6–1	4–2	4–1	Quit (Note: No vote; Osten chose to quit the game.)	6–4	8–1	5–2–1	5–2	4–2	3–2	3–1	1–0
Voter	Votes															
Sandra				Burton	Michelle	Trish	Shawn		Andrew	Ryan O.	Jon	Tijuana	Lillian	Burton	Darrah	None (Note: Jon and Sandra were not eligible to vote as the only eligible players they could vote for were each other.)
Lillian	Nicole	Osten	Darrah						Andrew	Ryan O.	Rupert	Tijuana	Christa	Burton	Darrah	Jon
Jon				Burton	Michelle	Rupert	Shawn		Andrew	Ryan O.	Rupert	Tijuana	Christa	Lillian	Darrah	None
Darrah	Nicole	Ryan S.	Lillian						Jon	Ryan O.	Rupert	Burton	Christa	Burton	Lillian	
Burton				Christa					Andrew	Ryan O.	Rupert	Tijuana	Christa	Lillian		
Christa				Burton	Michelle	Trish	Shawn		Andrew	Ryan O.	Darrah	Tijuana	Lillian			
Tijuana	Nicole	Ryan S.	Lillian						Jon	Ryan O.	Rupert	Burton				
Rupert				Kidnapped (Note: For winning the immunity challenge, Morgan earned the right to "kidnap" a member of Drake; they selected Rupert, who was granted exemption from Tribal Council.)	Michelle	Trish	Shawn		Andrew	Ryan O.	Darrah					
Ryan O.	Nicole	Ryan S.	Lillian						Jon	Christa						
Andrew	Nicole	Ryan S.	Lillian						Jon							
Osten	Nicole	Ryan S.	Lillian					Quit								
Shawn				Burton	Michelle	Trish	Jon									
Trish				Burton	Michelle	Rupert										
Michelle				Christa	Shawn											
Ryan S.	Nicole	Osten														
Nicole	Ryan S.															

Outcasts vote
Episode	8					
Day	19					
Candidate	Burton	Lillian	Nicole	Ryan S.	Michelle	Trish
Vote	3	3	2	2	1	1
Voter	Votes					
Trish	Yes	Yes				
Michelle	Yes		Yes			
Burton			Yes		Yes	
Lillian				Yes		Yes
Ryan S.	Yes	Yes				
Nicole		Yes		Yes		

Jury vote
Episode	15	
Day	39	
Finalist	Sandra	Lillian
Vote	6–1	
Juror	Votes	
Jon	Yes	
Darrah	Yes	
Burton	Yes	
Christa	Yes	
Tijuana		Yes
Rupert	Yes	
Ryan O.	Yes	

== Reception ==
Survivor: Pearl Islands was met with critical acclaim and is generally considered to be one of the show's best seasons. It was ranked by host Jeff Probst as his 5th favorite season. Dalton Ross of Entertainment Weekly ranked it eighth, citing Rupert Boneham and Jonny Fairplay as memorable players. Both Andrea Deiher of Zap2it and Joe Reid of The Wire ranked it as the 9th-greatest season; Deiher called Fairplay's lie about his grandmother "some next-level shenanigans never before seen on reality TV," and Reid described Rupert and Fairplay as "two of the series' signature players" who "pretty much made the season." Since 2012, "Survivor Oz" has consistently ranked Pearl Islands in the top 5 greatest seasons, in its annual polls ranking every season of the series; it was 4th in 2012, 3rd in 2013 and 2015, and 5th in 2014. "The Purple Rock Podcast," ranked it as the 6th best season out of 40. In the official issue of CBS Watch commemorating Survivor's 15th anniversary, Pearl Islands was voted by viewers as the #2 greatest season of the series, only behind Heroes vs. Villains, and thus was the highest-ranking season with an entirely new cast. Also, Sandra Diaz-Twine was ranked in another poll, in the same magazine, as the 6th greatest contestant in the series, and was the highest-ranking contestant on the list to win her first time playing. Additionally, Fairplay's infamous lie about his grandmother's death was voted as the #10 most memorable moment in the series. In 2015, a poll by Rob Has a Podcast ranked Pearl Islands 2nd out of 30, behind Heroes vs. Villains, with Rob Cesternino ranking this season 3rd. This was updated in 2021 during Cesternino's podcast, Survivor All-Time Top 40 Rankings, ranking 3rd out of 40th. In 2020, Inside Survivor ranked this season as the show's best out of the first 40 calling it "the quintessential Survivor season, containing everything that makes the show so great: an incredible cast, exciting gameplay, a well-worked theme, fun challenges, jawdropping moments, humor, drama, emotion, etc." In 2024, Nick Caruso of TVLine ranked this season 8th out of 47.
