= La Ensenada =

Coordinates: 8.3664°N 78.8469°W

- Corregimiento
- Location within Panama
- Country: Panama
- Province: Panamá
- District: Balboa

Area
  - Land: 66.2 km^{2} (25.6 sq mi)

Population (2010)
  - Total: 94
  - Density: 1.4/km^{2} (3.6/sq mi)
- Population density calculated based on land area.
- Time zone: UTC−5 (EST)

La Ensenada is a corregimiento in Balboa District, Panamá Province, Panama with a population of 94 as of 2010. Its population as of 1990 was 97; its population as of 2000 was 89.
