= La Guinea =

Coordinates: 8.3425°N 78.9311°W

- Corregimiento
- Location within Panama
- Country: Panama
- Province: Panamá
- District: Balboa

Area
  - Land: 29.6 km^{2} (11.4 sq mi)

Population (2010)
  - Total: 83
  - Density: 2.8/km^{2} (7.3/sq mi)
- Population density calculated based on land area.
- Time zone: UTC−5 (EST)

La Guinea is a corregimiento in Balboa District, Panamá Province, Panama with a population of 83 as of 2010. Its population as of 1990 was 245; its population as of 2000 was 90.
