= Saboga =

Coordinates: 8.6167°N 79.0667°W

- Corregimiento
- Location within Panama
- Country: Panama
- Province: Panamá
- District: Balboa

Area
  - Land: 8.1 km^{2} (3.1 sq mi)

Population (2010)
  - Total: 713
  - Density: 88.5/km^{2} (229/sq mi)
- Population density calculated based on land area.
- Time zone: UTC−5 (EST)

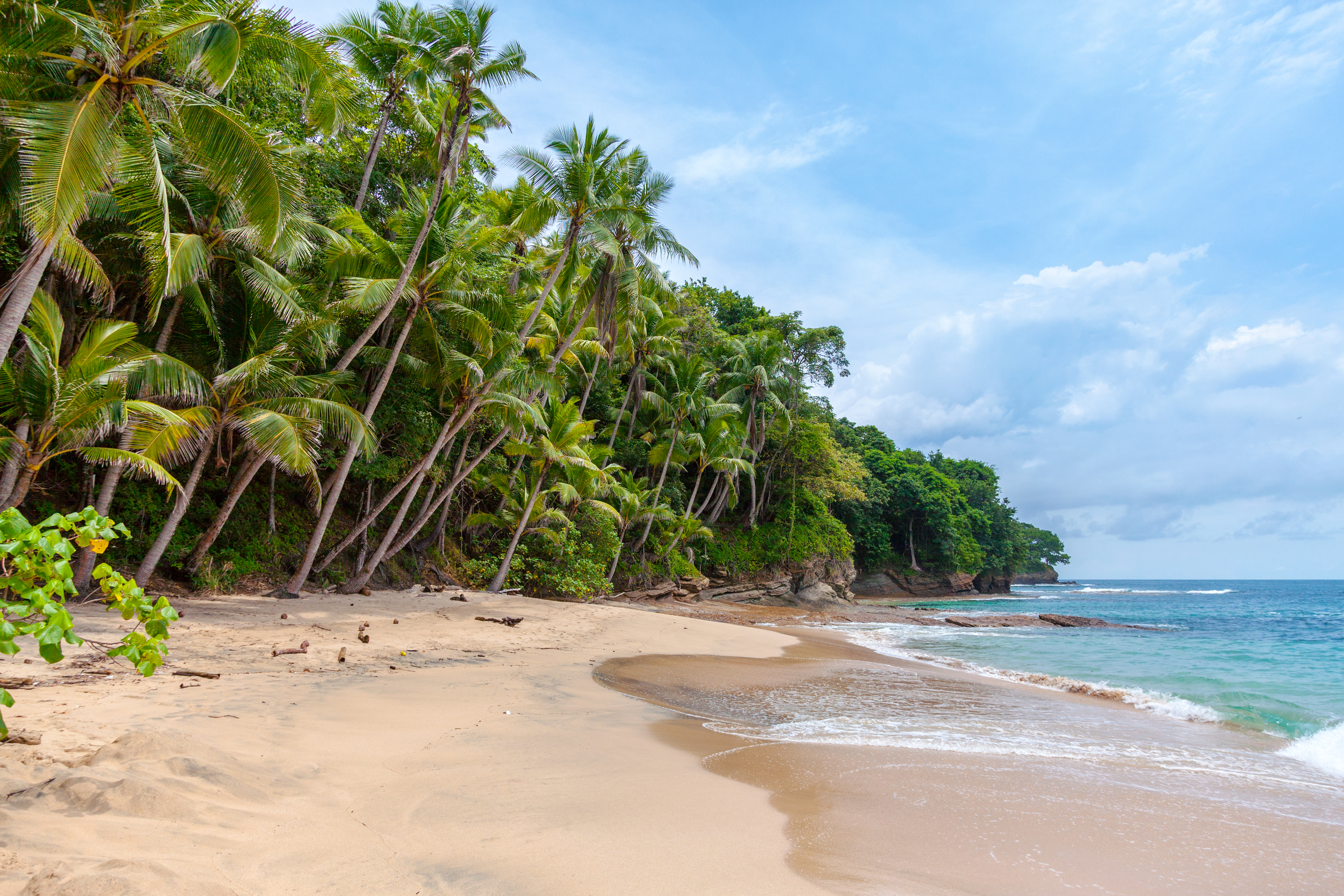
Playa Blanca in Saboga

Saboga is a corregimiento in Balboa District, Panamá Province, Panama with a population of 713 as of 2010. Its population as of 1990 was 344; its population as of 2000 was 680.
