= La Esmeralda, Panama =

Coordinates: 8.2675°N 78.9233°W

La Esmeralda
- Corregimiento
- Location within Panama
- Country: Panama
- Province: Panamá
- District: Balboa

Area
  - Land: 39.5 km^{2} (15.3 sq mi)

Population (2010)
  - Total: 524
  - Density: 13.3/km^{2} (34/sq mi)
- Population density calculated based on land area.
- Time zone: UTC−5 (EST)

La Esmeralda is a corregimiento in Balboa District, Panamá Province, Panama with a population of 524 as of 2010. Its population as of 1990 was 446; its population as of 2000 was 413.
