= Survivor: The Philippines (Israeli season) =

- Season 3
- Survivor: The Philippines logo
- Presented by: Guy Zu-Aretz
- No. of days: 52
- No. of castaways: 25
- Winner: Shay Arel
- Runner-up: Tom Altagar
- Location: Caramoan Peninsula, Camarines Sur, Philippines
- No. of episodes: 35 (+4)

Release
- Original network: Channel 10
- Original release: August 29 – December 30, 2009

Additional information
- Filming dates: February – April, 2009

Season chronology
- ← Previous; Pearl Islands Next → Fans vs. Survivors

Survivor: The Philippines (Hebrew: הישרדות הפיליפינים, Hisardut HaPhilipinim) is the third season of Israeli competitive reality television show Survivor. It was filmed in February and April 2009 in the Philippines, and aired on Channel 10 from August 29 until December 30 of that year, when Shay Arel was named the winner over Tom Altagar and Leora Goldberg by a vote of 6–3–0, and Tal Englander was named the audience's favorite player by winning a public vote.

This season featured the most competitors to date, with 25. Seven of these contestants were eliminated from the main game in the first two days, and sent to another island to compete against each other for a chance to return. This was shown in a four-part companion series, Survivor: The Philippines – The Hidden Island (Hebrew: הישרדות הפיליפינים – האי הנעלם, Hisardut HaPhilipinim — HaAi HaNaalam), which aired separately from the main series during the first four weeks of broadcast.

The game largely followed the format from the previous season, but hidden immunity idols and Exile Island duels were modified for this season only. Instead of hidden immunity idols being hidden at tribe camps or Exile Island, the winner of each post-merge duel received half an idol, which could only be used at the following two Tribal Councils; castaways could either try to win the subsequent duel for the other half, or combine halves with the castaway who won an adjacent duel. For the duels, the Exile Island component was removed, and the dueling castaways returned to their tribes immediately following the challenge.

This season also featured an appearance from Rupert Boneham, a contestant from the American version of Survivor, who appeared as part of a reward in a reward challenge.

== The Hidden Island ==
This season introduced the Hidden Island, a secluded location where eliminated contestants competed against each other to return to the game. During the first two days, the 25 contestants competed in a series of challenges; one castaway was eliminated on Day 1 after losing two challenges, while six more were eliminated the following day after not being chosen for tribes. These seven castaways were sent to the Hidden Island, unbeknownst to the other castaways.

On the Hidden Island, the castaways competed in challenges; the first-place competitor won a reward and the power to nominate a castaway for banishment, while the last-place competitor automatically became the other nominee. The five non-nominated castaways then voted between the two nominees to permanently eliminate one from the game, at which point they were replaced with the latest castaway eliminated from the main game (the new arrivals were immune from nomination for one round, but were still eligible to compete in the challenge). After four rounds, the seven remaining Hidden Island residents competed for four spots to return to the game: one by being chosen by the other residents as the "best social player" and three by winning a two-stage challenge. The four returning contestants then became the captains for two new tribes, and the Hidden Island was retired.

The Hidden Island contestants were given an additional method of re-entry by way of a team challenge. The castaways sent four representatives to one of the tribe camps, where they were given ten minutes to find a special flag; doing so would result in all seven Hidden Island contestants returning to the game, with that tribe taking their place on the Hidden Island. The Hidden Island contestants lost this challenge.

== Contestants ==
Contestant	Original tribe	Switched tribe	Merged tribe	Main game (Note: Elimination order is based on when the contestant was voted out at Tribal Council.)	Hidden Island
Ori Lapid; 32, Tel Aviv	None			Eliminated; Day 1	1st banished Day 3
Eitan Bernat; 23, Herzliya	None			Not chosen Day 2	Quit; Day 6
Liran Giladi; 23, Caesarea	None			Not chosen Day 2	2nd banished Day 9
Merav Fishelson; 44, Tel Aviv	None			Not chosen Day 2	Lost challenge Day 14
Avital Eisman; Returned to game	None			Not chosen Day 2	4th returnee Day 14
Liad Farkash; Returned to game	None			Not chosen Day 2	2nd returnee Day 14
Tal "Talco" Cohen; Returned to game	None			Not chosen Day 2	1st returnee Day 14
Meital Ben David; 31, Kiryat Ono	Carao			1st voted out Day 4	Lost challenge Day 14
Noa Waintraub; 26, Ra'anana	Carao			2nd voted out Day 7	3rd banished Day 12
Riki Shemesh; Returned to game	Tinago			3rd voted out Day 10	3rd returnee Day 14
Yael Zucker; 23, Tel Aviv	Carao			4th voted out Day 13	Lost challenge Day 14
Yakov Crispel; 40, Haifa	Tinago	Tinago		Evacuated; Day 20	
Inna Bakelman; 19, Gan Yavne	Tinago	Carao		5th voted out Day 20	
Avital Eisman; 23, Hadera	None	Carao		Evacuated; Day 21	
Natalie Niv; 28, Nahariya	Carao	Tinago		Quit; Day 23	
Tal Ben David; 29, Sdot Yam	Tinago	Tinago		6th voted out Day 26	
Avi Raz; 27, Mevaseret Zion	Carao	Carao		7th voted out Day 29	
Tal Englander; 30, Tel Aviv	Tinago	Carao	Mansaka	8th voted out 1st jury member Day 33	
Hanoch Budin; 46, Ness Ziona	Carao	Carao	Mansaka	9th voted out 2nd jury member Day 36	
Ziv Gelbart; 39, Megadim	Carao	Tinago	Mansaka	10th voted out 3rd jury member Day 39	
Riki Shemesh; 33, Gan Sorek	Tinago	Carao	Mansaka	11th voted out 4th jury member Day 42	
Avigail Perl; 25, Tel Aviv	Tinago	Tinago	Mansaka	12th voted out 5th jury member Day 45	
Ohad Taib; 23, Rishon LeZion	Tinago	Tinago	Mansaka	13th voted out 6th jury member Day 45	
Liad Farkash; 22, Ramat Yishai	None	Tinago	Mansaka	14th voted out 7th jury member Day 48	
Hadas Hornblass; 27, Elkana	Carao	Carao	Mansaka	15th voted out 8th jury member Day 51	
Tal "Talco" Cohen; 29, Haifa	None	Tinago	Mansaka	Eliminated (Note: Talco was eliminated during the live finale by a public vote.); 9th jury member Finale	
Leora Goldberg; 50, Ra'anana	Tinago	Carao	Mansaka	2nd runner-up	
Tom Altagar; 23, Ganei Tikva	Tinago	Tinago	Mansaka	Runner-up	
Shay Arel; 31, Kiryat Ata	Carao	Carao	Mansaka	Sole Survivor	

== Season summary ==
Main game and Hidden Island challenge winners and eliminations by cycle
Main game						The Hidden Island						
Episodes		Challenge winner(s)		Voted out	Finish	Episode		Challenge winner	Challenge loser	Winner's nominee	Eliminated	Finish
No.	Original air date	Reward	Immunity	Voted out	Finish	No.	Original air date	Challenge winner	Challenge loser	Winner's nominee	Eliminated	Finish
1	August 29, 2009	None		Ori	Eliminated (Note: Noa, Riki and Ori lost the initial challenge; they competed in a second challenge where the two winners would become the tribe captains, while the loser would be sent to the Hidden Island.); Day 1	HI1	September 3, 2009	Eitan	Merav	Ori	Ori	1st banished Day 3
1	August 29, 2009	None		Liad	Not chosen (Note: The 22 contestants who won the first challenge — 12 men and 10 women — competed in an endurance challenge, through which they were divided into groups of three based on their performance. The captains then began choosing the tribes, drafting one member of each group per tribe, sending the third member to the Hidden Island; all members of the top group per gender were guaranteed to be chosen for a tribe. Due to the number of women, the top performer became the sole member of the top group.); Day 2	HI1	September 3, 2009	Eitan	Merav	Ori	Ori	1st banished Day 3
1	August 29, 2009	None		Liran	Not chosen Day 2	HI1	September 3, 2009	Eitan	Merav	Ori	Ori	1st banished Day 3
1	August 29, 2009	None		Avital	Not chosen Day 2	HI1	September 3, 2009	Eitan	Merav	Ori	Ori	1st banished Day 3
1	August 29, 2009	None		Eitan	Not chosen Day 2	HI1	September 3, 2009	Eitan	Merav	Ori	Ori	1st banished Day 3
1	August 29, 2009	None		Merav	Not chosen Day 2	HI1	September 3, 2009	Eitan	Merav	Ori	Ori	1st banished Day 3
1	August 29, 2009	None		Talco	Not chosen Day 2	HI1	September 3, 2009	Eitan	Merav	Ori	Ori	1st banished Day 3
2	September 2, 2009	Carao	Tinago	Meital	1st voted out Day 4	HI2	September 10, 2009	Eitan	Avital	Merav	Eitan (Note: During the elimination vote between nominees Avital and Merav, Eitan chose to quit the game instead, thus cancelling the vote.)	Quit; Day 6
3 & 4	September 5 & 9, 2009	Carao	Tinago	Noa	2nd voted out Day 7	HI3	September 17, 2009	Merav	Meital	Liran	Liran	2nd banished Day 9
3 & 4	September 5 & 9, 2009	Carao	Hadas (Note: For winning the immunity challenge, Tinago had to send a representative to the Carao camp, to reward a member of Carao with individual immunity. Avigail was sent, and she gave individual immunity to Hadas.)	Noa	2nd voted out Day 7	HI3	September 17, 2009	Merav	Meital	Liran	Liran	2nd banished Day 9
5 & 6	September 12 & 16, 2009	Tinago	Carao	Riki	3rd voted out Day 10	HI4	September 24, 2009	Riki	Talco	Noa	Noa	3rd banished Day 12
7 & 8	September 23 & 26, 2009	Tinago	Tinago	Yael	4th voted out Day 13	9	September 30, 2009	Talco (Note: The seven final Hidden Island residents were asked to designate among them the "best social player". They chose Talco, who automatically returned to the game as a result.)	None		Meital	Lost challenge Day 14
7 & 8	September 23 & 26, 2009	Tinago	Tinago	Yael	4th voted out Day 13	9	September 30, 2009	Liad (Note: Returned to game upon winning final Hidden Island challenge.)	None		Yael	Lost challenge Day 14
7 & 8	September 23 & 26, 2009	Tinago	Tinago	Yael	4th voted out Day 13	9	September 30, 2009	Riki	None		Merav	Lost challenge Day 14
7 & 8	September 23 & 26, 2009	Tinago	Tinago	Yael	4th voted out Day 13	9	September 30, 2009	Avital	None		Merav	Lost challenge Day 14

Post-tribe swap challenge winners and eliminations by cycle
Episode		Challenge winner(s)			Duel		Voted out	Finish
No.	Original air date	Reward	Tribal immunity	Individual immunity	Winner	Loser	Voted out	Finish
9 & 10	September 30 & October 3, 2009	None	Tinago	Tal E.	None		Crispel	Evacuated; Day 20
9 & 10	September 30 & October 3, 2009	None	Tinago	Tal E.	None		Inna	5th voted out Day 20
11 & 12	October 7 & 10, 2009	Both tribes (Note: Due to Avital's injury during the challenge and subsequent evacuation from the game, the challenge was not completed and both tribes received a reward.)	Carao	Ohad	None		Avital	Evacuated; Day 21
11 & 12	October 7 & 10, 2009	Both tribes	Carao	Ohad	None		Natalie	Quit; Day 23
13 & 14	October 14 & 17, 2009	Multiple (Note: The castaways voted for tribemates to receive various rewards.)	Carao	Talco	Tom	Tal E.	Tal B.	6th voted out Day 26
15 & 16	October 21 & 24, 2009	Tinago	Tinago	Tal E.	Shay	Ohad	Avi	7th voted out Day 29

Post-merge swap challenge winners and eliminations by cycle
Episodes		Challenge winner(s)			Duel		Eliminated	Finish
No.	Original air date	Reward	Immunity	Veto	Winner	Loser	Eliminated	Finish
17, 18 & 19	October 28 & 31, November 4, 2009	Hadas, Hanoch, Liad, Riki, Tom, Ziv	Tom	Ziv	Shay	Hanoch	Tal E.	8th voted out 1st jury member Day 33
20 & 21	November 7 & 11, 2009	Hadas, Liad, Leora, Shay, Ziv	Tom	Tom	Ziv	Shay	Hanoch	9th voted out 2nd jury member Day 36
22 & 23	November 14 & 18, 2009	Shay [Riki]	Avigail	Hadas	Tom	Liad	Ziv	10th voted out 3rd jury member Day 39
24 & 25	November 21 & 25, 2009	Avigail, Leora, Ohad, Tom	Ohad	Ohad	Tom	Leora	Riki	11th voted out 4th jury member Day 42
26 & 27	November 28 & December 2, 2009	Ohad, Shay, Talco, Tom	Tom	Leora	Shay	Ohad	Avigail	12th voted out 5th jury member Day 45
26 & 27	November 28 & December 2, 2009	Ohad, Shay, Talco, Tom	Tom	Leora	Shay	Ohad	Ohad	13th voted out 6th jury member Day 45
28 & 29	December 5 & 9, 2009	Hadas [Leora]	Shay	Hadas	Hadas	Talco	Liad	14th voted out 7th jury member Day 48
30 & 31	December 12 & 16, 2009	Shay [Hadas]	Leora	Tom	Shay	Tom	Hadas	15th voted out 8th jury member Day 51
33 & 35 (Note: Episodes 32 and 34 were recap episodes.)	December 23 & 30, 2009	None	Leora	None			Talco	Eliminated (Note: Talco was eliminated during the live finale by a public vote.); 9th jury member Finale
33 & 35	December 23 & 30, 2009						Jury vote	
33 & 35	December 23 & 30, 2009						Leora	2nd runner-up
33 & 35	December 23 & 30, 2009						Tom	Runner-Up
33 & 35	December 23 & 30, 2009						Shay	Sole Survivor

== Voting history ==
	Original tribes				Switched tribes							Merged tribe								
Episode #	2	4	6	8	10		11	12		14	16	19	21	23	25	27		29	31	35
Day #	4	7	10	13	20		21	23		26	29	33	36	39	42	45		48	51	Finale (Note: Talco was eliminated during the live finale by a public vote.)
Eliminated	Meital	Noa	Riki	Yael	Crispel	Inna	Avital	Tie (Note: The initial vote resulted in a tie between Tal B. and Talco; the tie was to be resolved by a firemaking competition, but Natalie chose to quit the game instead, thus cancelling the tiebreaker.)	Natalie	Tal B.	Avi	Tal E.	Hanoch	Ziv	Riki	Avigail	Ohad	Liad	Hadas	Talco
Votes	7–2	5–2–1	6–3	5–2	Evacuated (Note: No vote; Crispel was medically evacuated from the game.)	6–3	Evacuated (Note: No vote; Avital was medically evacuated from the game.)	4–4	Quit (Note: No vote; Natalie chose to quit the game.)	4–3	4–2–1	7–2–1–1	8–2	6–2–1	6–1–1	6–1	4–1–1	3–2	4–0	Public vote
Voter	Vote																			
Shay	Meital	Noa		Yael		Inna					Leora	None (Note: This castaway was given the veto bracelet, and was therefore not eligible to vote.)	Hanoch	Talco	Riki	Avigail	Ohad	Liad	Hadas	
Tom			Riki					Talco		Ziv		Tal E.	Hanoch	Ziv	Riki	None (Note: Tom was given the veto bracelet for the double Tribal Council, and was therefore not eligible to vote for either ballot.)		None	Hadas	
Leora			Riki			Inna					Avi	Tal E.	Hanoch	Ziv	Riki	Avigail	Liad	Liad	Hadas	Immune (Note: Leora won the final immunity, therefore, was immune at the live finale public vote.)
Talco								Tal B.		Tal B.		Tal E.	Hanoch	Tom	Riki	Avigail	Ohad	Tom	Hadas	
Hadas	Meital	Noa		Yael		Inna					Avi	Avigail	Hanoch	Ziv	None	Avigail	Ohad	Liad	None	
Liad								Tal B.		Tal B.		Tal E.	Hanoch	Tom	Tom	Avigail	Ohad	Tom		
Ohad			Riki					Talco		Ziv		Tal E.	Hanoch	Ziv	Riki	Avigail	Shay			
Avigail			Crispel					Talco		Tal B.		Tal E.	Ziv	Ziv	Riki	Shay				
Riki			Crispel			Leora					Leora	Leora	None	Ziv	Leora					
Ziv	Meital	Noa		Yael				Tal B.		Tal B.		Tal E.	Hanoch	None						
Hanoch	Meital	Ziv		Yael		Inna					Avi	Ziv	Ziv							
Tal E.			Riki			Inna					Avi	Ziv								
Avi	Meital	Yael		Yael		Leora					Riki									
Tal B.			Riki					Talco		Ziv										
Natalie	Meital	Noa		Hadas				Tal B.												
Avital						Inna														
Inna			Crispel			Leora														
Crispel			Riki																	
Yael	Meital	Noa		Hadas																
Noa	Ziv	Ziv																		
Meital	Ziv																			

Jury vote
Episode #	35		
Finalist	Leora	Tom	Shay
Votes	6–3–0		
Juror	Vote		
Talco			Shay
Hadas		Tom	
Liad			Shay
Ohad		Tom	
Avigail		Tom	
Riki			Shay
Ziv			Shay
Hanoch			Shay
Tal E.			Shay

=== Hidden Island voting history ===
Hidden Island
Episode #	HI1	HI2	HI3	HI4	9		
Day #	3	6	9	12	14		
Eliminated	Ori	Eitan	Liran	Noa	Meital	Yael	Merav
Votes	3–0	None (Note: No vote; Eitan chose to quit the game.)	3–0	3–1	None (Note: The seven final Hidden Island residents competed in a two-stage challenge to return to the game.)		
Voter	Vote				Result		
Talco	Ori		– (Note: As three votes had already been cast against one of the nominees for banishment, there was no need for this castaway to vote.)	None (Note: This castaway was a nominee for banishment, and was thus ineligible to vote.)	Return (Note: The seven final Hidden Island residents were asked to designate among them the "best social player". They chose Talco, who automatically returned to the game as a result.)		
Liad	Ori		Liran	Noa	Win		Return (Note: Returned to game upon winning final Hidden Island challenge.)
Riki				Noa	Win		Return
Avital	–		Liran	–	Win		Return
Merav	None		Liran	Noa	Win		Lose
Yael					Lose		
Meital			None	Talco	Lose		
Noa			–	None			
Liran	Ori		None				
Eitan	–						
Ori	None						
