= Isla San Telmo =

Island in Panama

Coordinates: 8°16′36″N 78°50′42″W

Isla San Telmo is located in the southeast area of the Pearl Islands in Panama. It is the first landsighting when sailing to the port of Panama. The Reserva Natural Isla San Telmo was established in 1996 as a protection measure for the island; marine turtles are noted on the beaches, endemic birds and animals are found in the premontane forest, and the island waters are a whale breeding area.

== Geography ==
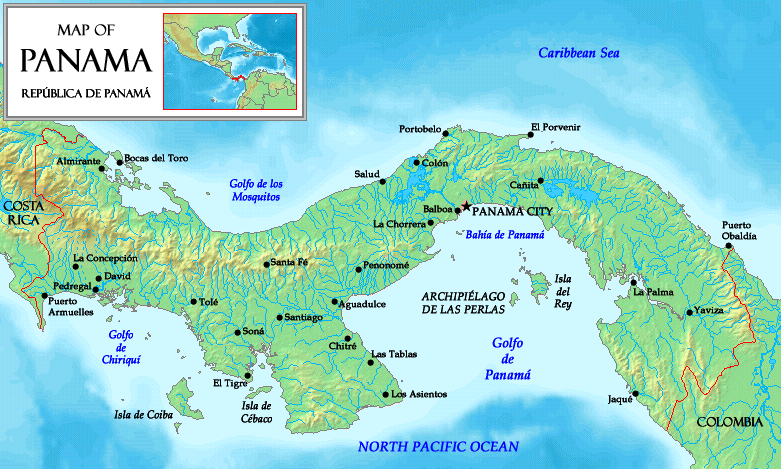
Archipelago de las Perlas

Isla San Telmo is a small island measuring 1.73 square kilometres (0.67 sq mi) in area. The island is located on the triangle shaped Bay of Panama, facing the Pacific Ocean to its west. The smallest of the many volcanic islands in the Archipelago de las Perlas to the southeast of the main island, it is heavily forested and was once a coastal valley. The bay is full of marine fauna with molluscs and fish. Rio Cacique is approximately 3 nautical miles (5.6 km; 3.5 mi) to the northwest. There is a reef measuring 1.25 nautical miles (2.32 km; 1.44 mi) between Isla San Telmo and Isla del Rey. Isla Galera is approximately 5.5 nautical miles (10.2 km; 6.3 mi) nautical miles to the southeast.

== History ==
Isla San Telmo is named after St. Elmo, also called Saint Erasmus, who was a 4th-century martyr; he is the patron saint of mariners. Spanish marine charts show this island in their maps. Indigenous people lived in the forested area near the shores till the arrival of Spaniards. Shell fish, found in profusion in these islands, were named "Perlas" by the Europeans. Following overexploitation, the original settlers left, and only the black descendants of slaves inhabit the islands in the present day, engaged in subsistence farming and fishing.

== Submarine wreck ==
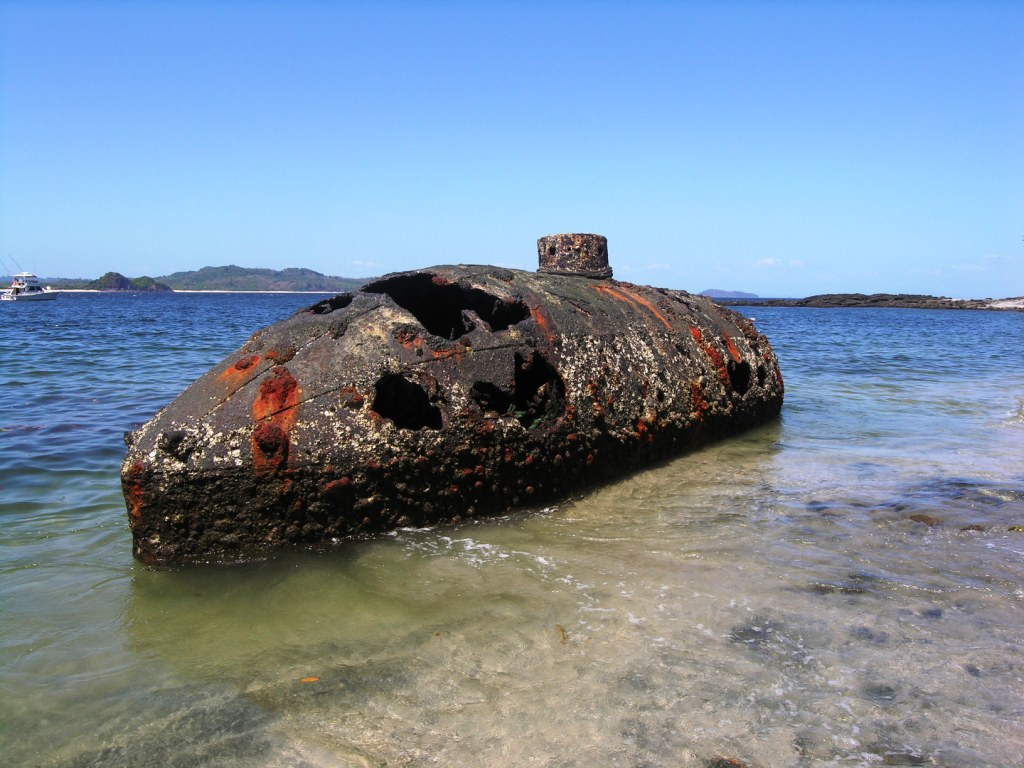
Hull of Sub Marine Explorer wreck in the Panama Canal

The wreck of a submarine can be seen off the beach during low tide. The Japanese had examined this submarine and stated that it did not belong to them. However, a subsequent underwater study by German divers reported that it belonged to the Japanese, having wrecked when the Japanese intended to destroy the strategically important Panama Canal in 1942. It was conjectured that the submarine was abandoned by its crew due to technical problems and the crew had taken refuge on the island.

Subsequently, Jim Delgado of the Vancouver Maritime Museum investigated the wreck. A local fisherman told Delgado about the wreck that he had observed during the low tide, a rusted and weed covered metal body off the coast of St. Thelmo. Delgado saw this wreck sitting on the coastline of St. Thelmo, but did not believe the fisherman's conjecture that the wreck was of a Japanese submarine that operated in the Panama Canal during World War II. He explored the wreck, recorded its dimensions, but could not link it to any known vessels as it resembled more of a science fantasy vessel. After five years, it was identified as the "Sub Marine Explorer", an underwater craft designed by Julius H. Kroehl, a German engineer who also reportedly died because of this vessel, that was one of the world's first submarines. It is now established that it was a pioneering vessel, of which a few more examples are also stated to have been preserved, which did underwater explorations during the 19th century. Richard Wills, an American Civil War submarine specialist, confirmed that details about the Sub Marine Explorer were published in a scientific article in 1902. Investigations revealed that there were several technical problems in the vessel which had resulted in several tragedies and the submarine was an "iron coffin" in the Pacific Ocean bed. As the story of the submarine was widely circulated, Delgado set out to explore the submarine further, in 2002 and 2004.

== Bibliography ==
- Baker, Christopher P. (3 January 2011). Explorer's Guide Panama: A Great Destination (Explorer's Great Destinations). Countryman Press. ISBN 978-1-58157-944-4.
- Delgado, James P. (19 March 2012). Misadventures of a Civil War Submarine: Iron, Guns, and Pearls. Texas A&M University Press. ISBN 978-1-60344-381-4.
- Doggett, Scott (1999). Panama. Lonely Planet.
- Rains, Patricia Miller; Miller, Patricia (1 June 2000). Cruising Ports: The Central American Route. Mexico Boating Guide. ISBN 978-0-9638470-2-7.
