= Pearl Islands =

Group of islands off of Panama

Coordinates: 8°20′N 79°07′W

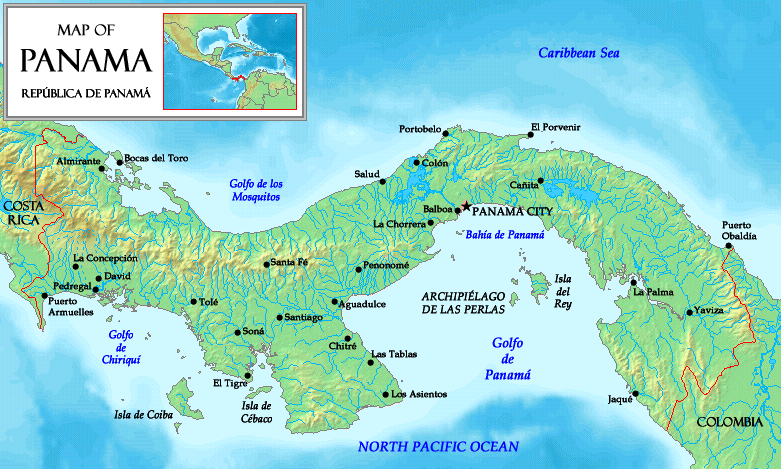
Location of the Pearl Islands (Archipiélago de las Perlas) in the Gulf of Panama

The Pearl Islands (Spanish: Archipiélago de las Perlas or Islas de las Perlas) is a group of 200 or more islands and islets (many tiny and uninhabited) lying about 30 miles (48 km) off the Pacific coast of Panama in the Gulf of Panama.

== Islands ==
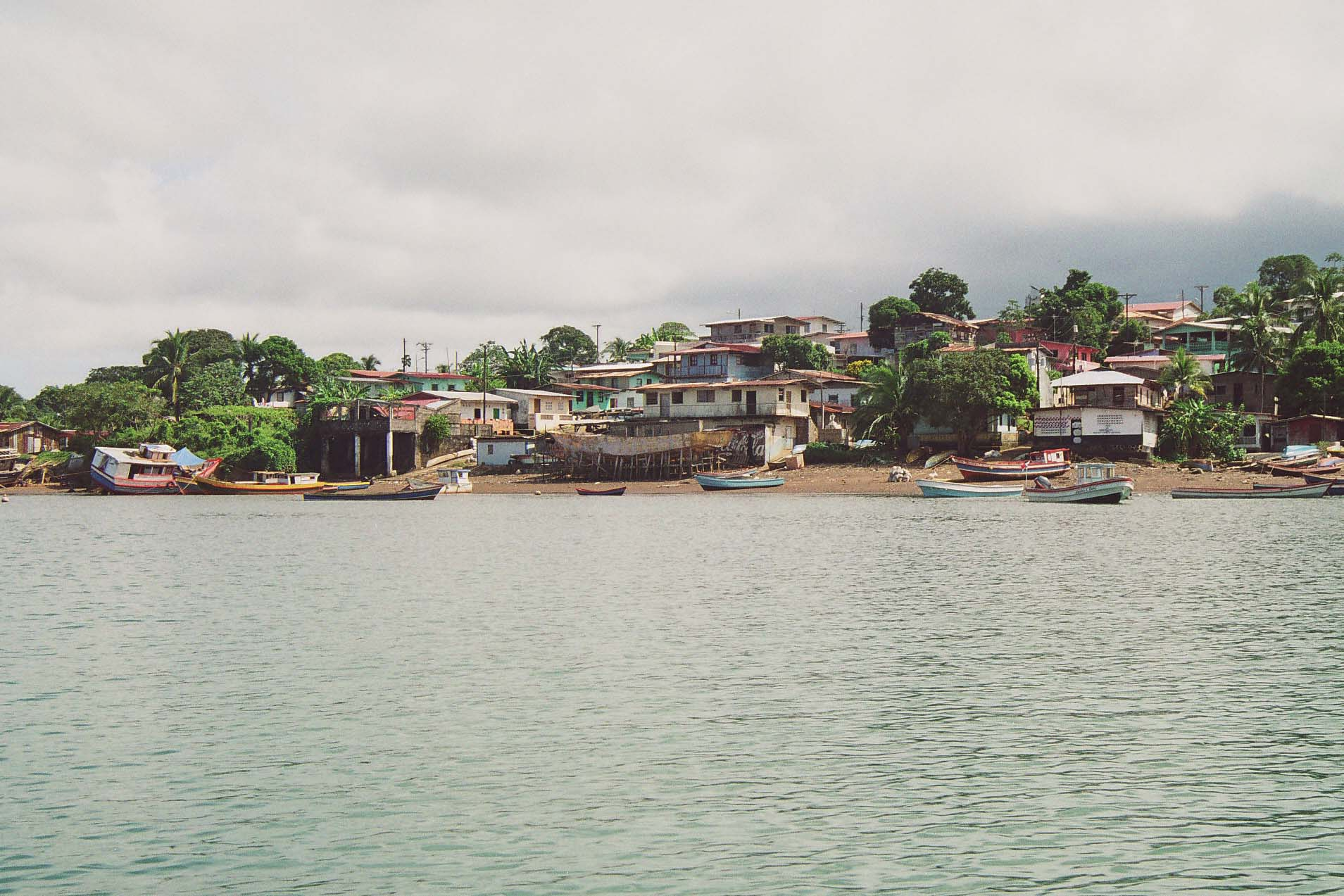
San Miguel, Isla del Rey

The most notable island is Contadora Island (or Isla Contadora in Spanish), known for its resorts. Contadora was said to be used by the Spanish conquistadors as a stop for taking inventory of booty prior to returning to Spain, hence the name (contador means counter or bookkeeper in Spanish). Contadora is a resort island, with many homes owned by wealthy Panamanians. There are a large hotel and other cabins available. Most of the resort workers live on nearby Isla Saboga.

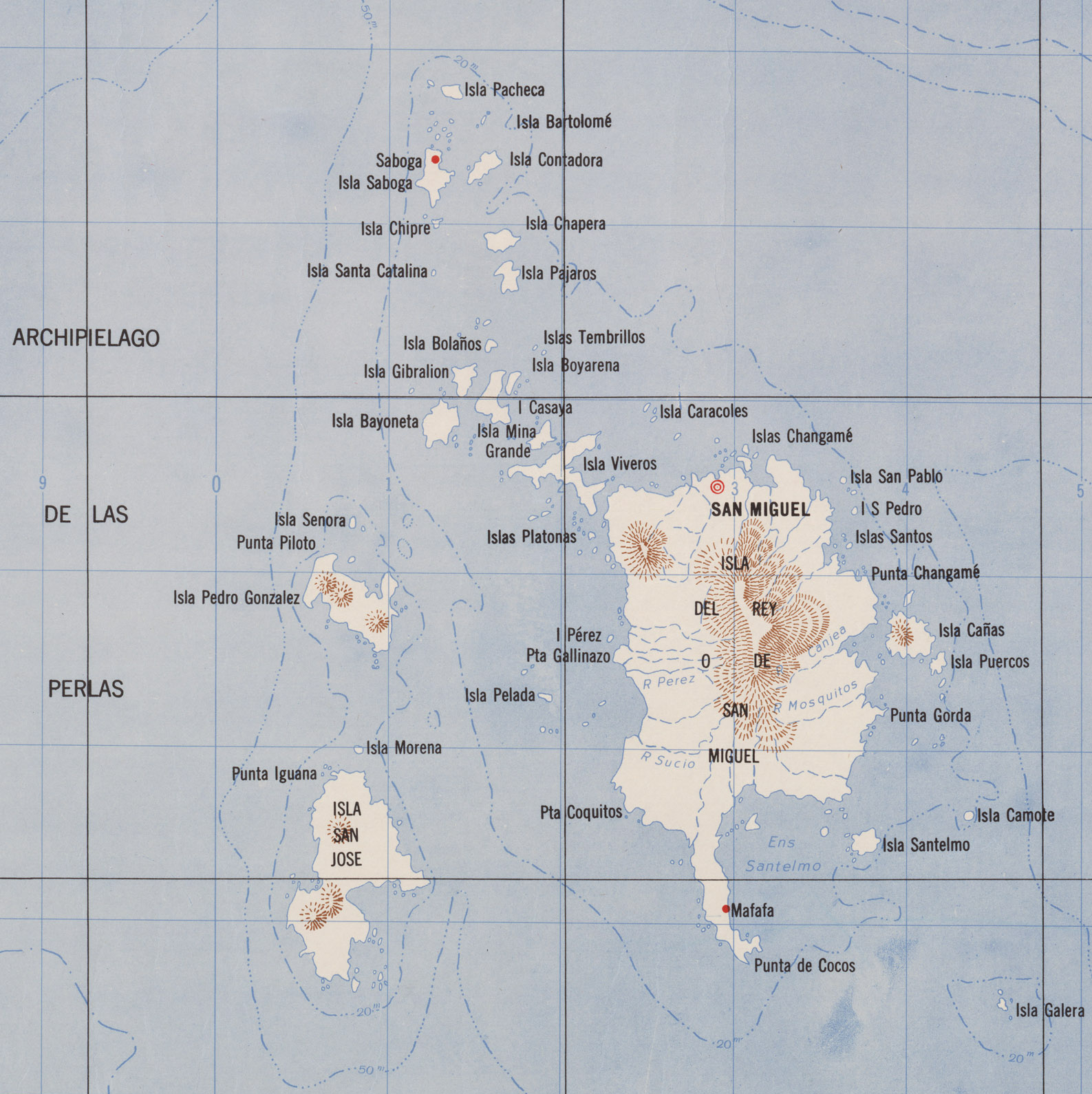
1949 map of the Pearl Islands

Domestic airline Air Panama no longer flies between Panama City and Contadora and Isla San José. FlyTrip, a new domestic airline, flies on Fridays and Sundays. While Sea de Las Perlas Ferry does daily trips to Contadora and Saboga islands (which are islands near Las Perlas). This ferry also goes to Vivieros, San Miguel and Isla Bolaños. There are a few hotel options in Contadora which are mostly boutique hotels, bed and breakfasts, inns and some vacation homes. Saboga, Isla Bolaños, Viveros and Isla San Jose have lodging options.

The largest island, at 234 square kilometres (90 sq mi), is Isla del Rey ("Island of the King"), its name probably referring to Christ the King rather than to a secular king. Isla del Rey has several towns, most notably San Miguel. It is easily larger than the other Pearl Islands combined, and is the second largest island in Panama, after Coiba.

Other islands in the archipelago include Bayoneta Island, Bolano Island, Buena Vista Island, Cana Island, Casaya Island, Chapera Island, Chitre Island, Cocos Island, Espiritu Santo Island, Galera Island, Gallo Island, Isla Gibraleón, Isla Bayoneta, Lampon Island, Marin Island, Mina Island, Mogo Mogo o Pajaro, Pacheca Island, Pachequille Island, Pedro Gonzalez Island, Puerco Island, Isla San José, Senora Island, Vivenda Island, and Viveros Island.

The island of Galera has a façade of very tall coconut palm trees and a white sandy beach. Strong currents, combined with shallows and jagged reefs surrounding the island, make navigation near the island perilous.

== History ==
Three million years ago the Isthmus of Panama was created. Until then North and South America were divided by sea. It was the biggest and reportedly the most significant geological event in 60 million years. Prior to that date as the Earth's plates had begun to join the Pearl Islands were created and they emerged from the sea. On Contadora Island and other islands in the group pre-Columbian artifacts have been found. The biggest island is Isla del Rey where more than fifteen pre-Columbian recognised archeological sites of the “Cuevas” and “Cocle” cultures have been identified. However, none of the original population remain.

The islands were first occupied by native populations who were (with their leader Terarequí) wiped out within two years of the islands' discovery by the Spanish. Spaniard Vasco Nunez de Balboa named the islands Pearl Islands on his discovery of them in 1513 due to the many pearls which were found there. Another Spaniard, Gaspar de Morales, part of a rogue group not under Balboa's authority, murdered 20 local Indian chiefs not long after and gave them to his dogs to tear to pieces. The Spaniards then needed workers to harvest pearls and imported slave labour in the 16th century from Africa whose descendants now live on the islands, particularly del Rey.

The islands were frequently used by pirates in the following years and were relatively undisturbed until the 1960s and 1970s. The Shah of Iran retreated to the resort building on Contadora in 1979.

== Environment ==
The Chamber for Sustainable Tourism Las Perlas aims to preserve the islands' delicate ecological balance.

=== Important Bird Area ===
The archipelago has been designated an Important Bird Area (IBA) by BirdLife International because it supports significant breeding colonies of brown pelicans.

== Publicity ==
The Pearl Islands are a popular location for reality TV programs, particularly Survivor. The American edition has had 3 seasons (namely Survivor: Pearl Islands, Survivor: All-Stars and Survivor: Panama) set on the islands. Season 2 of the Israeli version of the program (titled Survivor: Pearl Islands), season 1 of Survivor South Africa (titled Survivor South Africa: Panama), season 4 of the French edition (titled Koh-Lanta: Panama), season 3 of the Bulgarian version (titled Survivor BG: Pearl Islands) and Ukrainian versions of the show were all set on the islands.

Other programs, namely BBC TV series The Real Swiss Family Robinson, the British TV series The Island with Bear Grylls (which used the islands of Isla Gibraleón and Isla San Telmo) and season 1 of the Dutch television series Adam Looking for Eve used Mogo Mogo Island as location. The third season of The Challenge: All Stars filmed its final challenge on San José Island. MrBeast's Beast Games also used Isla La Vivienda as a filming location.

== See also ==
- Contadora Group
