= Buzaglo (surname) =

Buzaglo (Hebrew: בוזאגלו, Arabic: بوزاجلو or بوزاغلو) is a surname of Moroccan Jewish origin which today is mostly found in Israel. Notable people with the surname include:

- Asi Buzaglo, Israeli footballer
- Jacob Buzaglo, Israeli footballer
- Maor Buzaglo, Israeli footballer
- Shalom Buzaglo, Moroccan kabbalist
- Tim Buzaglo, English footballer and cricketer
- William Buzaglo, incorrect name for Abraham Buzaglo, Moroccan-British inventor
