= Survivor: VIP (2021 Israeli season) =

- Season 11
- Presented by: Guy Zu-Aretz
- No. of days: 40
- No. of castaways: 19
- Winner: Alla Eibinder
- Runners-up: Jacqueline "Jackie" Azoulay, Odelya Swisa
- Location: Philippines
- No. of episodes: 56

Release
- Original network: Reshet 13
- Original release: 16 October 2021 – 2 April 2022

Additional information
- Filming dates: 5 April – 14 May 2021

Season chronology
- ← Previous; VIP Next → Manila

The 2021 season of Survivor: VIP (Hebrew: הישרדות VIP, romanized: Hisardut VIP) is the eleventh season overall of the Israeli reality program Survivor and the fourth VIP season. The season featured 19 celebrity contestants competing against each other for the 1 million NIS prize. The season was filmed in the Philippines between April and May 2021 and aired on Reshet 13 from October 16, 2021 until April 2, 2022, when model Alla Eibinder defeated chef Jackie Azoulay in a live firemaking challenge after initially tying the jury's votes.

The season included the return of the Cabin Guard from the previous season, in which eliminated players lived at the Negotiation Cabin and competed in duels to remain in or return to the game. In this season, if the Cabin Guard won the duel to steal a former tribemate's vote at Tribal Council, the Cabin Guard and the newly eliminated player were subject to a vote by the remaining tribe members to determine who between them would be the Cabin Guard and who would be permanently eliminated from the game, replacing the challenges from the previous season.

== Contestants ==
The 19 castaways include three former Survivor players — Liya Gil (who became famous after appearing in the first season in 2007), Michael Lewis (who was medically evacuated from the 2012 VIP season) and Zohar Strauss (who competed in the 2020 VIP season) — and formerly married couple Ohad Buzaglo (brother of Survivor: VIP 2020 winner Asi Buzaglo) and Fani Bar Moha.

Initially, Strauss was introduced as "the Masked Survivor" and sat out of the opening challenge, in which the 18 other players were divided into two tribes of nine: Apolaki, named after the Tagalog and Pangasinan god of the sun, and Libulan, named after the Visayan god of the moon. At the conclusion of the challenge, Strauss chose to join the victorious Apolaki tribe and revealed his identity to the others. On Day 23, the remaining players were merged into the Pag-asa tribe, named after the Filipino word for "hope".

List of Survivor: VIP contestants
Contestant	Original tribe	Post-Cabin swap (Note: At the Negotiation Cabin on Day 11, Kobi and Liza chose one member to switch to the other tribe; they chose Shira and Vered, respectively.)	Switched tribe	Merged tribe	Main game	Cabin Guard
Henry David; 42, Matat; Actor	Libulan				1st voted out Day 2	Lost duel 2 Day 7
Ohad Buzaglo; 39, Bat Yam; Former footballer	Apolaki				2nd voted out Day 4	Lost duel 4 Day 10
Maayan Ashkenazi; 30, Herzliya; Model, Big Brother 8	Apolaki				4th voted out Day 10	Lost duel 5 Day 12
Fani Bar Moha; 34, Akko; Model	Libulan				3rd voted out Day 7	Quit; Day 14
Liza Bikh; 25, Beersheba; Influencer	Libulan	Libulan	Apolaki		7th voted out Day 19	Lost duel 7 Day 19
Michael Lewis; 33, Herzliya; Model, Survivor: VIP (2012)	Libulan	Libulan	Apolaki		8th voted out Day 21	Lost duel 9 Day 21
Vered Buskila; 37, Tel Aviv; Olympic sailor	Libulan	Apolaki	Libulan		6th voted out Day 16	Lost duel 11; Day 22
Kobi Maor; 43, Petah Tikva; Actor	Apolaki	Apolaki	Apolaki	Pag-asa	10th voted out Day 23	Lost duel 12; 1st jury member Day 23
Zohar Strauss; Returned to game	Apolaki (Note: As “the Masked Survivor,” Zohar was able to join either tribe after they were both formed. He chose Apolaki, and revealed his identity immediately thereafter.)	Apolaki			5th voted out Day 13	1st returnee Day 23
Yuval Shem-Tov; 48, Neve Yarak; Children’s performer	Libulan	Libulan	Libulan	Pag-asa	11th voted out Day 26	Lost duel 14; 2nd jury member Day 26
Gad "Gadi" Panivilov; 23, Kiryat Haim; Big Brother 10	Apolaki	Apolaki	Libulan	Pag-asa	12th voted out Day 28	Lost duel 16; 3rd jury member Day 28
Liya Gil; 48, Tel Aviv; Home stylist, Survivor: The Caribbean Islands	Libulan	Libulan	Libulan		9th voted out Day 22	Lost duel 17; 4th jury member Day 30
Jonathan Bashan; 31, Herzliya; Actor	Apolaki	Apolaki	Libulan	Pag-asa	13th voted out Day 30	Lost duel 19; 5th jury member Day 32
David "Dudu" Aouate; 43, Nof HaGalil; Former footballer	Apolaki	Apolaki	Apolaki	Pag-asa	15th voted out Day 34	Lost duel 21; 6th jury member Day 34
Dan "Dandan" Bolotin; 62, Ranen; Wilderness expert	Libulan	Libulan	Libulan	Pag-asa	14th voted out Day 32	Lost duel 22; 7th jury member Day 36
Zohar Strauss; 49, Ramat Gan; Actor, Survivor: VIP (2020)	Apolaki	Apolaki		Pag-asa	16th voted out 8th jury member Day 36	
Shira Farber; 52, Tel Aviv; Filmmaker	Apolaki	Libulan	Apolaki	Pag-asa	17th voted out 9th jury member Day 39	
Odelya Swisa; 34, Yeruham; Big Brother 10	Libulan	Libulan	Apolaki	Pag-asa	2nd runner-up	
Jacqueline "Jackie" Azoulay; 48, Tel Aviv; MasterChef 3	Apolaki	Apolaki	Apolaki	Pag-asa	Runner-up	
Alla Eibinder; 33, Ramat Gan; Model, The Amazing Race 4 and 8	Apolaki	Apolaki	Libulan	Pag-asa	Sole Survivor	

== Season summary ==
Pre-merge challenge winners and eliminations by cycle
Episode(s)	Original air date(s)	Challenge winner(s)			Vote duel		Voted out	Finish	Cabin Guard duel	
Episode(s)	Original air date(s)	Reward	Tribal immunity	Individual immunity	Winner	Loser	Voted out	Finish	Winner	Loser
1 & 2	October 16 & 17, 2021	Apolaki		None			Henry	1st voted out Day 2	None	
3 & 4	October 18 & 19, 2021	Apolaki	Libulan	Shira (Note: This player earned individual immunity by being the first member of their tribe to ring the bell after losing the immunity challenge.)	None		Ohad	2nd voted out Day 4	None	
5–8	October 23, 25, 27 & 30, 2021	Auction		Odelya	Henry	Odelya	Fani	3rd voted out Day 7	Fani	Henry
5–8	October 23, 25, 27 & 30, 2021	Apolaki		Yuval	Henry	Odelya	Fani	3rd voted out Day 7	Fani	Henry
9–12	November 2, 6, 8 & 13, 2021	Libulan	Libulan	~~Dudu~~; Jackie (Note: At Tribal Council, Dudu gave his individual immunity to Jackie.)	Ohad	Maayan	Maayan	4th voted out Day 10	Maayan	Ohad
13–16	November 15, 17, 20 & 22, 2021	Libulan	Libulan	Vered (Note: For switching tribes, Vered and Shira would receive individual immunity if their new tribe lost the next immunity challenge. Apolaki lost, and Vered became immune.)	Gadi	Maayan	Zohar	5th voted out Day 13	None	
13–16	November 15, 17, 20 & 22, 2021	Libulan	Libulan	Jonathan	Gadi	Maayan	Zohar	5th voted out Day 13	None	
17–21	November 24 & 27, December 1, 4 & 6, 2021	Libulan	Apolaki	Liya	None (Note: There was no vote duel as Fani, Libulan's Cabin Guard, had quit the game on Day 14.)		Vered	6th voted out Day 16	None	
17–21	November 24 & 27, December 1, 4 & 6, 2021	Libulan	Apolaki	Yuval	None		Vered	6th voted out Day 16	None	
22–25	December 8, 11, 13 & 15, 2021	Apolaki	Libulan	Kobi	Zohar	Shira	Liza	7th voted out Day 19	Zohar	Liza
22–25	December 8, 11, 13 & 15, 2021	Apolaki	Libulan	Michael	Zohar	Shira	Liza	7th voted out Day 19	Zohar	Liza
26–30	December 20, 22, 25, 27 & 29, 2021	Libulan	None (Note: Due to both tribes being sent to Tribal Council, there was no tribal immunity challenge.)	Kobi	Zohar	Odelya	Michael	8th voted out Day 21	Zohar	Michael
26–30	December 20, 22, 25, 27 & 29, 2021	Libulan	None	Gadi	Vered	Alla	Liya	9th voted out Day 22	Liya	Vered
26–30	December 20, 22, 25, 27 & 29, 2021	Libulan	None	Jonathan	Vered	Alla	Liya	9th voted out Day 22	Liya	Vered

Post-merge challenge winners and eliminations by cycle
Episode(s)	Original air date(s)	Challenge winner(s)		Reward duel		Vote duel		Voted out	Finish	Cabin Guard duel	
Episode(s)	Original air date(s)	Reward	Immunity	Winner	Loser	Winner	Loser	Voted out	Finish	Winner	Loser
31–33	January 1, 5 & 8, 2022	None	Dandan (Note: At the Negotiation Cabin, Odelya and Yuval were to choose one member of the other tribe to be excluded from the merge feast and, unknowingly, earn immunity from that day's Tribal Council. As they were unable to come to a decision, Zohar, as the longest-lasting Cabin Keeper, chose Dandan and Jackie.)	None		None (Note: There was no vote duel due to the merge.)		Kobi	10th voted out Day 23	Zohar (Note: For placing first in the Cabin Guard challenge, Zohar returned to the game with individual immunity at the next Tribal Council.)	Kobi
31–33	January 1, 5 & 8, 2022	None	Jackie	None		None		Kobi	10th voted out Day 23	Liya	Kobi
33–35	January 8, 12 & 15, 2022	Dudu [Jackie, Odelya]	Zohar	None		Liya	Alla	Yuval	11th voted out Day 26	Liya	Yuval
33–35	January 8, 12 & 15, 2022	Dudu [Jackie, Odelya]	Dudu	None		Liya	Alla	Yuval	11th voted out Day 26	Liya	Yuval
33–35	January 8, 12 & 15, 2022	Dudu [Jackie, Odelya]	Dandan	None		Liya	Alla	Yuval	11th voted out Day 26	Liya	Yuval
36–39	January 19, 22, 25 & 26, 2022	Dudu (Note: The Reward Challenge divided into two, Dudu won the Boys challenge and Jackie won the Girls challenge.)	Dandan	Alla	Liya	Liya	Odelya	Gadi	12th voted out Day 28	Liya	Gadi
36–39	January 19, 22, 25 & 26, 2022	Jackie	Zohar	Alla	Liya	Liya	Odelya	Gadi	12th voted out Day 28	Liya	Gadi
40–42	January 29, February 2, & 8, 2022	Dudu [Alla, Jonathan, Jackie]	Jackie	Liya	Jonathan	Alla	Liya	Jonathan	13th voted out Day 30	None	
43–45	February 13, 16 & 20, 2022	Shira [Jackie, Odelya, Alla]	Dudu	Zohar	Jonathan	Jonathan	Zohar	Dandan	14th voted out Day 32	Dandan	Jonathan
43–45	February 13, 16 & 20, 2022	Shira [Jackie, Odelya, Alla]	Alla	Zohar	Jonathan	Jonathan	Zohar	Dandan	14th voted out Day 32	Dandan	Jonathan
46–49	February 27, March 2, 6, & 9, 2022	Dudu	Jackie	Odelya	Dandan	Dandan	Odelya	Dudu	15th voted out Day 34	Dandan	Dudu
46–49	February 27, March 2, 6, & 9, 2022	Dudu	Zohar	Odelya	Dandan	Dandan	Odelya	Dudu	15th voted out Day 34	Dandan	Dudu
50–52	March 13, 16, & 21, 2022	Auction	~~Zohar~~ (Note: Jackie used the immunity cancellation advantage she received in the Auction to nullify Zohar's immunity.)	Shira	Dandan	Odelya	Dandan	Zohar	16th voted out Day 36		
53–55	March 23, 28, & 30, 2022	Odelya	Jackie	None				Shira	17th voted out Day 39		
56	April 2, 2022							Jury vote			
56	April 2, 2022							Odelya	2nd runner-up		
56	April 2, 2022							Jackie	Runner-up		
56	April 2, 2022							Alla	Sole Survivor		

== Voting history ==
	Original tribes				Post-Cabin swap	Switched tribes				Merged tribe							
Episode #	2	4	8	12	16	21	25	28	30	32	35	39	42	45	49	52	55
Day #	2 (Note: Both tribes voted at Libulan's Tribal Council on Day 2.)	4	7	10	13	16	19	21	22	23	26	28	30	32	34	36	39
Eliminated	Henry	Ohad	Fani	Maayan	Zohar	Vered	Liza	Michael	Liya	Kobi	Yuval	Gadi	Jonathan	Dandan	Dudu	Zohar	Shira
Votes	10–8–2	7–3	6–2	5–4	5–3	4–3	5–3	4–2	3–3 (Note: The initial vote resulted in a tie between Dandan and Liya; as such, the tie was resolved by a fire-making competition, which Dandan won.)	5–3–2	5–4–1-1	5–4–1	7-2	4–3–0 (Note: After ringing the bell, the penalty vote incurred against Alla was not counted.)	4–2–0 (Note: After ringing the bell, the penalty vote incurred against Jackie was not counted.)	4–1	3–1
Voter	Vote																
Alla	Henry	Gadi		Maayan	Kobi	Dandan			None (Note: For losing the duel, this castaway was unable to vote at the next Tribal Council, while the Cabin Guard voted in their stead.)	Kobi	None	Dudu	Zohar	Dandan	Dudu	Zohar	Shira
Jackie	Henry	Ohad		Gadi	Zohar		Liza	Michael		Gadi	Yuval	Gadi	Jonathan	Dandan	Dudu	Zohar	Shira
Odelya	Michael		None				Liza	None		Jonathan	Yuval	None	Jonathan	Dandan	None	Zohar	Shira
Shira	Henry	Ohad		Maayan			None	Michael		Jonathan	Yuval	Gadi	Jonathan	Dandan	Dudu	Zohar	Alla
Zohar	Henry	Ohad		Maayan	Kobi		Liza (Note: For winning the duel, the Cabin Guard voted at the next Tribal Council in the place of the castaway they defeated.)	Shira			Jackie	Gadi	Jonathan	None	Shira	Jackie	
Dudu	Henry	Gadi		Gadi	Zohar		Liza	Michael		Gadi	Yuval	Gadi	Jonathan	Shira	Shira		
Dandan	Fani		Fani			Vered			Liya	Kobi	Odelya	Dudu	Jonathan	Shira	Dudu		
Jonathan	Henry	Ohad		Gadi	Zohar	Vered			Dandan	Kobi	Odelya	Dudu	Zohar	Shira			
Gadi	Henry	Ohad		Maayan	Kobi	Dandan			Dandan	Kobi	Odelya	Dudu					
Yuval	Fani		Fani			Vered	Dudu (Note: At the Negotiation Cabin, Dudu and Jonathan chose one member of their tribe to vote at the other tribe's Tribal Council, should their tribe win the tribal immunity challenge; they chose Odelya and Yuval, respectively. Libulan won the challenge and Yuval voted at Apolaki's Tribal Council.)		Liya	Kobi	Odelya						
Kobi	Henry	Ohad		Gadi	Zohar		Liza	Michael		Gadi							
Liya	Fani		Fani			Vered			Dandan		Yuval	Jackie					
Michael	Fani		Fani				Dudu	Shira									
Liza	Fani		Fani				Dudu										
Vered	Fani		Fani		Zohar	Dandan			Liya								
Maayan	Henry	Ohad		None													
Fani	Michael		Vered														
Ohad	Henry	Gadi		Maayan													
Henry	Fani		Vered														
Penalty	Fani (Note: For losing the final duel in the Day 1 tribe selection challenge, Fani received a penalty vote at the first Tribal Council.)										Alla (Note: For placing last in the immunity challenge, this castaway received a penalty vote at Tribal Council.)	Gadi	Jonathan	~~Alla~~	~~Jackie~~	Shira	

Jury vote
Episode #	56		
Day #	40		
Finalist	Jackie	Alla	Odelya
Votes	4-4-0 (Note: The initial vote resulted in a tie between Jackie and Alla; as such, the tie was resolved by a fire-making competition, which Alla won.)		
Juror	Vote		
Shira	Jackie		
Zohar	Jackie		
Dandan		Alla	
Dudu	Jackie		
Jonathan		Alla	
Liya	None (Note: For winning the final reward challenge, Odelya earned the power to stop one of the jurors from voting for the winner; she chose Liya.)		
Gadi		Alla	
Yuval		Alla	
Kobi	Jackie		
