= Buzaglo =

Buzaglo may refer to:

- Buzaglo (surname), a Moroccan Jewish surname
- The Buzaglo, a stove invented by Abraham Buzaglo (1716-1788)
- The Buzaglo test, an idiom in Israel
