= Almog Buzaglo =

Israeli footballer

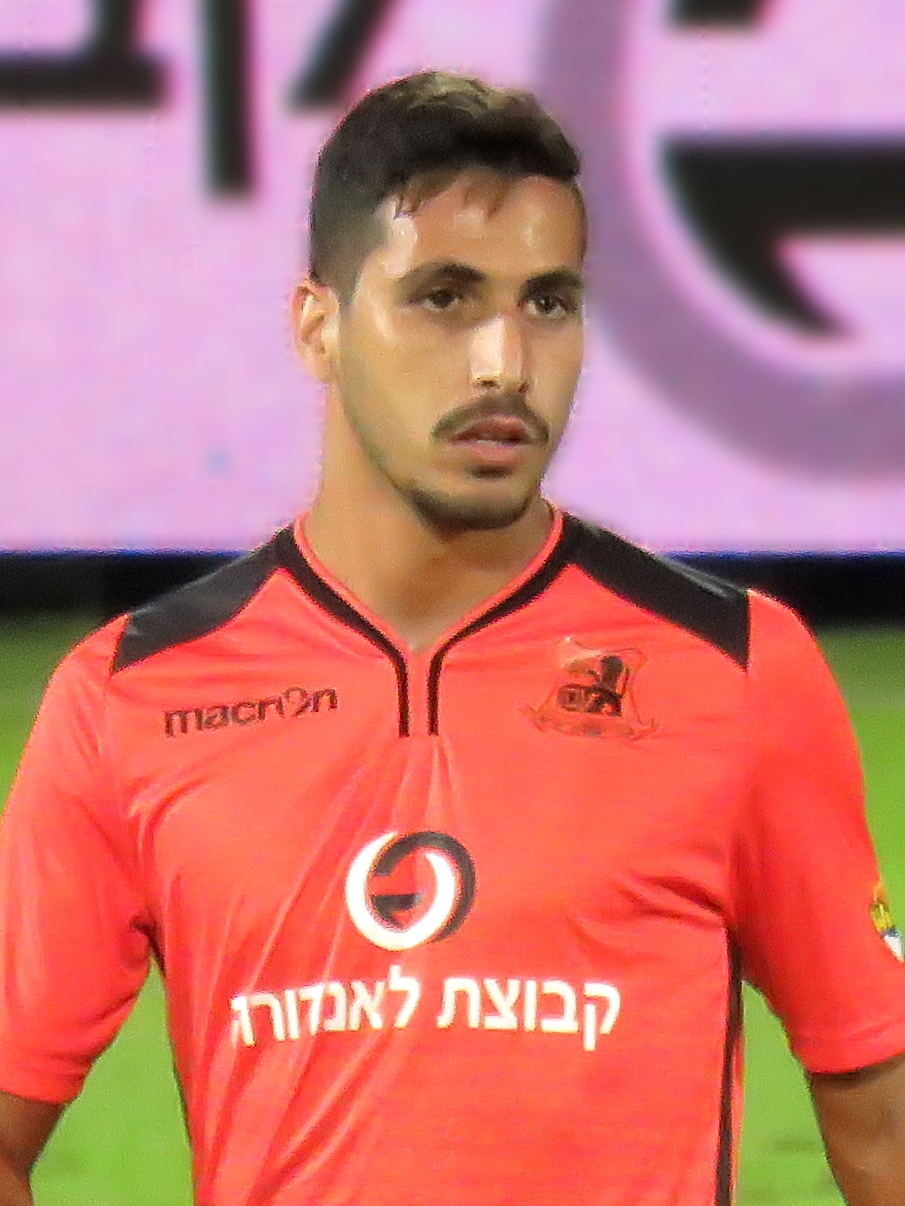
- Buzaglo playing for Bnei Yehuda Tel Aviv in 2015

Personal information
- Full name: Almog Buzaglo
- Date of birth: December 8, 1992 (age 33)
- Place of birth: Holon, Israel
- Position: Midfielder

Youth career
- Hapoel Tel Aviv
- Hapoel Petah Tikva
- Bnei Sakhnin
- Hapoel Petah Tikva
- Maccabi Amishav Petah Tikva

Senior career*
Years	Team	Apps	(Gls)
2009–2010	Hapoel Petah Tikva	1	(0)
2010–2013	Maccabi Amishav Petah Tikva	52	(16)
2013–2015	Hapoel Ramat Gan	63	(15)
2015–2018	Bnei Yehuda Tel Aviv	89	(11)
2018–2021	Hapoel Haifa	30	(1)
2021–2022	Bnei Yehuda Tel Aviv	53	(13)
2022–2023	Sektzia Ness Ziona	30	(8)
2023–2025	Bnei Yehuda Tel Aviv	32	(10)
2025	Maccabi Yavne	6	(0)

International career
2008	Israel U-16	2	(0)
- * Club domestic league appearances and goals

Almog Buzaglo (Hebrew: אלמוג בוזגלו; born December 8, 1992) is an Israeli former professional footballer who played as Midfielder.

== Personal life ==
Almog's father is Jacob Buzaglo a former player who played in the 70's and 80's in Hapoel Tel Aviv, Beitar Jerusalem and Hapoel Jerusalem. His older brothers are Maor Buzaglo of Hapoel Be'er Sheva and Asi Buzaglo who also plays in Maccabi Amishav Petah Tikva. and Ohad Buzaglo Manager at Hapoel Jerusalem.

== Career ==
On 5 December 2009, Buzaglo made his Israeli Premier League debut in Hapoel Petah Tikva's 2–0 loss to Hapoel Be'er Sheva in a match where his older brother Asi also played. He came on the 70th minute as a substitute for Armon Ben-Naim.

== Honours ==
=== Club ===
Bnei Yehuda

- Israel State Cup (1): 2016–17
