= Survivor: VIP (2020 Israeli season) =

- Season 10
- Presented by: Guy Zu-Aretz
- No. of days: 37
- No. of castaways: 18
- Winner: Asi Buzaglo
- Runner-up: Israel Ogalbo
- Location: Philippines
- No. of episodes: 62

Release
- Original network: Reshet 13
- Original release: May 2 – September 13, 2020

Additional information
- Filming dates: August, 2019 – October, 2019

Season chronology
- ← Previous; 2019 Next → 2021

The 2020 season of Survivor: VIP (Hebrew: הישרדות VIP, romanized: Hisardut VIP) is the tenth season overall of the Israeli reality program Survivor and the third VIP season. The season featured 18 celebrity contestants competing against each other for the 1 million NIS prize. The season was filmed in the Philippines between August and October 2019, and began airing on Reshet 13 on May 2, 2020.

== Format changes ==
This season largely retained the format of previous seasons, with several changes:

- Airing format: This season aired four to five episodes per three-day cycle, compared to the two episodes per cycle schedule of previous seasons.
- Cabin Guard: Voted out players became Cabin Guards, who lived at the Negotiation Cabin (as seen in all seasons since the 2012 VIP season), where representatives from each tribe met to broker deals, such as allocating resources or picking contestants to switch tribes. If the deliberating contestants could not come to a conclusion in the allotted time, the Cabin Guard who had been there the longest would make the decision for them.
- Duels: There were three types of duels involving the Cabin Guards, of which the first two were similar to the zombie's duels from season seven, Survivor: Honduras.
  - Vote duel: Immediately after each tribal immunity challenge, the losing tribe's Cabin Guard would challenge one of the tribe members to a duel. If the Cabin Guard won the duel, they voted in the duel loser's stead at the upcoming Tribal Council, and had the power to summon one member of the losing tribe to the Cabin to strategize for the vote. If the Cabin Guard lost the duel, they exited the game. After the merge, these duels occurred immediately before the immunity challenge.
  - Cabin Guard duel: If the Cabin Guard won the vote duel, they duelled the player voted out at the next Tribal Council for the right to remain the Cabin Guard. At two predetermined points, winners of these duels returned to the game.
  - Reward duel: After the merge, one tribe member competed in a duel against the Cabin Guard. If the player won the duel, one of their tribemates received a video call from a loved one. If the Cabin Guard won two consecutive duels, they would immediately return to the game. These duels were held in lieu of the veto challenges seen in all seasons since the second season, Survivor: Pearl Islands.
- Popularity ratings: Contestants regularly ranked their tribemates throughout the game. On the first day, players ranked the others; the nine most popular players formed the Kapre tribe, while the remaining nine formed the Anting Anting tribe. Before each reward challenge, players ranked their tribemates. Before the merge, the player from each tribe with the lowest rating was unable to enjoy the reward should their tribe win the challenge, and were unable to compete in the individual immunity challenge should their tribe lose the tribal immunity challenge. After the merge, the player with the lowest rating was unable to compete in the reward challenge.
- Penalty vote: After the merge, the contestant who placed last in the immunity challenge received a penalty vote at that night's Tribal Council. This was similar to the veto challenge penalty votes from the 2012 VIP season.

== Contestants ==
List of Survivor: VIP contestants
Contestant	Original tribe	Post-Cabin swap (Note: At the Negotiation Cabin on Day 4, Israel and Alina chose one member to switch to the other tribe; they chose Adi and Nava, respectively.)	Post-mutiny (Note: On Day 11, Benny and Israel were temporarily switched to the other tribe. At the immunity challenge later that day, they were given the opportunity to remain with their new tribes; they both accepted.)	Switched tribe	Merged tribe	Main game (Note: Elimination order is based on when the contestant was voted out at Tribal Council.)	Cabin Guard
Dana Ron; 48, Tel Aviv; Television presenter, Big Brother 3	Anting Anting					Quit; Day 1	
Ilana Avital; 60, Ramat HaSharon; Singer	Kapre					1st voted out Day 3	Lost duel 13; 2nd jury member Day 26
Zohar Strauss; 48, Ramat Gan; Actor	Anting Anting	Anting Anting				2nd voted out Day 6	Lost duel 4 Day 14
Nava Boker; 49, Hadera; Journalist, politician	Anting Anting	Kapre				Quit; Day 9	
Nikol Reznikov; 20, Afula; Miss Israel 2018	Kapre	Kapre	Kapre			3rd voted out Day 12	Lost duel 3 Day 12
Adi Bity; 18, Hod HaSharon; Singer, actress	Kapre	Anting Anting	Anting Anting			4th voted out Day 15	Lost duel 6 Day 18
Semion Grafman; 45, Bat Yam; Activist	Kapre	Kapre	Kapre	Anting Anting		5th voted out Day 18	Lost duel 7 Day 20
Ido Kozikaro; Returned to game	Kapre	Kapre	Kapre	Anting Anting		6th voted out Day 21	1st returnee Day 22
David Dvir; 70, Ramat Gan; Dancer, choreographer	Anting Anting	Anting Anting	Anting Anting	Kapre		7th voted out Day 22	Lost duel 8 Day 22
Lital Smadja; 32, Petah Tikva; Beauty and the Geek 2 winner	Kapre	Kapre	Kapre	Anting Anting	Tondo	8th voted out Day 24	Lost duel 11; 1st jury member Day 24
Ido Kozikaro; 42, Haifa; Former basketball player	Kapre	Kapre	Kapre	Anting Anting	Tondo	9th voted out Day 26	Lost duel 15; 3rd jury member Day 28
Alina Levy; Returned to game	Anting Anting	Anting Anting	Anting Anting	Anting Anting	Tondo	10th voted out Day 28	2nd returnee Day 31
Regev Hod; 39, Rehovot; Singer, The Amazing Race 6	Anting Anting	Anting Anting	Anting Anting	Kapre	Tondo	11th voted out Day 30	Lost duel 18; 4th jury member Day 30
Israel Ogalbo; Returned to game	Kapre	Kapre	Anting Anting	Anting Anting	Tondo	12th voted out Day 32	3rd returnee Day 35
Ella Ayalon; 22, Tel Aviv; Model	Anting Anting	Anting Anting	Anting Anting	Kapre	Tondo	13th voted out Day 32	Lost duel 20; 5th jury member Day 32
Benny Bruchim; 47, Kfar Saba; Comedian	Anting Anting	Anting Anting	Kapre	Kapre	Tondo	14th voted out Day 34	Lost duel 21; 6th jury member Day 35
Alina Levy; 29, Ra'anana; Actress, model, Big Brother 2	Anting Anting	Anting Anting	Anting Anting	Anting Anting	Tondo	15th voted out 7th jury member Day 37	
Yarden Gerbi; 30, Netanya; Olympic judo bronze medalist	Kapre	Kapre	Kapre	Kapre	Tondo	2nd runner-up 8th jury member (Note: The Final Tribal Council vote resulted in a tie for first place between Asi and Israel. As the other finalists, Idan and Yarden became the 8th and 9th members of the jury, and the jury revoted between the two remaining finalists.)	
Idan Haviv; 40, Tel Aviv; Singer, Survivor: Pearl Islands	Kapre	Kapre	Kapre	Kapre	Tondo	2nd runner-up 9th jury member	
Israel Ogalbo; 29, Tel Aviv; Big Brother 9 winner	Kapre	Kapre	Anting Anting	Anting Anting	Tondo	Runner-up	
Asi Buzaglo; 37, Petah Tikva; Former footballer	Anting Anting	Anting Anting	Anting Anting	Anting Anting	Tondo	Sole Survivor	

== Season summary ==
Pre-merge challenge winners and eliminations by cycle
Episode(s)	Original air date(s)	Challenge winner(s)			Vote duel		Voted out	Finish	Cabin Guard duel	
Episode(s)	Original air date(s)	Reward	Tribal immunity	Individual immunity	Winner	Loser	Voted out	Finish	Winner	Loser
1 & 2	May 2 & 5, 2020	Kapre		None			Dana	Quit; Day 1	None	
2 & 3	May 5 & 9, 2020	Kapre	Anting Anting	None			Ilana	1st voted out Day 3	None	
4, 5 & 6	May 12, 16 & 19, 2020	Anting Anting	Kapre	Adi (Note: For switching tribes, Adi and Nava would receive individual immunity if their new tribe lost the next immunity challenge. Anting Anting lost, and Adi became immune.)	None		Zohar	2nd voted out Day 6	None	
4, 5 & 6	May 12, 16 & 19, 2020	Anting Anting	Kapre	Asi	None		Zohar	2nd voted out Day 6	None	
7, 8, 9 & 10	May 23, 26, 27 & 30, 2020	Kapre	Anting Anting	Yarden	Ilana	Nava	Nava	Quit; Day 9	None	
11, 12, 13 & 14	June 2, 6, 9 & 13, 2020	Kapre	Anting Anting	Yarden	Ilana	Benny	Nikol	3rd voted out Day 12	Ilana	Nikol
11, 12, 13 & 14	June 2, 6, 9 & 13, 2020	Ido (Note: For winning the reward challenge, the Kapre tribe competed in a bonus reward challenge for an extra vote at a future Tribal Council, which Ido won.)	Anting Anting	Yarden	Ilana	Benny	Nikol	3rd voted out Day 12	Ilana	Nikol
15, 16, 17 & 18	June 14, 15, 16 & 17, 2020	Kapre	Kapre	Regev	Ella	Zohar	Adi	4th voted out Day 15	None	
19, 20, 21, 22 & 23	June 20, 21, 22, 23 & 27, 2020	Kapre	Kapre	Ido (Note: At the Negotiation Cabin before the tribes were switched, Asi and Idan gave individual immunity to one member from the other tribe; they chose Ido and Israel, respectively.)	Adi	Semion	Semion	5th voted out Day 18	Semion	Adi
19, 20, 21, 22 & 23	June 20, 21, 22, 23 & 27, 2020	Kapre	Kapre	Israel	Adi	Semion	Semion	5th voted out Day 18	Semion	Adi
19, 20, 21, 22 & 23	June 20, 21, 22, 23 & 27, 2020	Kapre	Kapre	Asi	Adi	Semion	Semion	5th voted out Day 18	Semion	Adi
24, 25, 26 & 27	June 28, 29, 30, & July 4, 2020	Anting Anting	Kapre	Israel	Lital	Semion	Ido	6th voted out Day 21	None	
28, 29 & 30	July 5, 7 & 8, 2020	Anting Anting		Regev (Note: For winning the reward/immunity challenge, the Anting Anting tribe observed Kapre's Tribal Council and voted to give immunity to one player from their tribe; Regev won the vote.)	None (Note: There was no vote duel due to the upcoming merge.)		David	7th voted out Day 22	Ido (Note: Returned to game upon winning duel.)	David
28, 29 & 30	July 5, 7 & 8, 2020	Anting Anting		Regev	None		David	7th voted out Day 22	Ilana	David

Post-merge challenge winners and eliminations by cycle
Episode(s)	Original air date(s)	Challenge winner(s)		Reward duel		Vote duel		Voted out	Finish	Cabin Guard duel	
Episode(s)	Original air date(s)	Reward	Immunity	Winner	Loser	Winner	Loser	Voted out	Finish	Winner	Loser
31, 33 & 34 (Note: Episode 32, which aired on July 12, 2020, was a recap episode.)	July 11, 14 & 15, 2020	Idan	Ido (Note: For placing first in the previous Cabin Guard challenge, Ido returned to the game with individual immunity at the next Tribal Council.)	Israel	Ilana	Ilana	Benny	Lital	8th voted out Day 24	Ilana	Lital
31, 33 & 34	July 11, 14 & 15, 2020	Idan	Asi	Israel	Ilana	Ilana	Benny	Lital	8th voted out Day 24	Ilana	Lital
35, 36, 37 & 38	July 18, 19, 21 & 22, 2020	Israel, Yarden [Ella, Ido]	Yarden	Asi	Ilana	Benny	Ilana	Ido	9th voted out Day 26	None	
39, 40, 41, 42 & 43	July 25, 26, 28, August 1 & 2, 2020	Alina [Idan]	Benny	Ido	Benny	Benny	Ido	Alina	10th voted out Day 28	None	
44, 45, 46, 47 & 48	August 4, 8, 9, 11 & 12, 2020	Survivor; Auction	~~Yarden~~; Benny (Note: At Tribal Council, Yarden chose to give her immunity to Benny.)	Alina	Regev	Alina	Regev	Regev	11th voted out Day 30	Alina	Regev
49, 50, 51 & 52	August 15, 16, 18 & 22, 2020	Idan [Alina, Asi]	Ella	Alina	Asi	None		Israel	12th voted out Day 32	None	
53	August 23, 2020	None (Note: Immediately after Israel was voted out, Tondo was instructed to vote out another member; there were no challenges.)						Ella	13th voted out Day 32	Israel	Ella
54, 55, 56, 57 & 58	August 25, 29, 31, September 1 & 2, 2020	Idan	Asi	None				Benny	14th voted out Day 34	Israel	Benny
59, 60 & 61	September 5, 8 & 12, 2020	Yarden	Idan	None				Alina	15th voted out Day 37		
62	September 13, 2020							Jury vote			
62	September 13, 2020							Idan	2nd runner-up		
62	September 13, 2020							Yarden	2nd runner-up		
62	September 13, 2020							Israel	Runner-up		
62	September 13, 2020							Asi	Sole Survivor		

== Voting history ==
	Original tribes		Post-Cabin swap		Post-mutiny		Switched tribes				Merged tribe								
Episode #	2	3	6	10	14	18	23		27	29	34	38	43	47	52	53		57	61
Day #	1	3	6	9	12	15	18		21	22	24	26	28	30	32			34	37
Eliminated	Dana	Ilana	Zohar	Nava	Nikol	Adi	Semion		Ido	David	Lital	Ido	Alina	Regev	Israel	Ella		Benny	Alina
Votes	Quit (Note: No vote; Dana chose to quit the game.)	8–1	5–3	Quit (Note: No vote; Nava chose to quit the game.)	5–2	6–1	3–2		3–2	1–0 (Note: For winning the reward/immunity challenge, the Anting Anting tribe got to vote to give immunity to one member of Kapre; Regev won the vote, therefore the five votes cast against him were not counted.)	5–4–1	5–4–1	4–4–0 (Note: The initial vote resulted in a tie between Alina and Regev; as such, the tie was resolved by a firemaking competition, which Regev won. Idan played a hidden immunity idol on Yarden, therefore the one vote against her was not counted.)	4–2–1–0 (Note: Yarden gave her immunity to Benny, therefore the penalty vote against him was not counted.)	5–3	4–2–1		4–2	3–1
Voter	Vote																		
Asi			Zohar			Adi	Semion		Lital		None (Note: For winning the reward challenge, Idan got to block another player from voting at the next Tribal Council; he chose Asi.)	Ido	Alina	Yarden	Alina	Ella	Ella (Note: Asi played an extra vote advantage, allowing him to cast two ballots during a single vote.)	Alina	Alina
Israel		Ilana				Adi	Semion		Ido		Yarden	Ido	Alina	Yarden	Alina				None (Note: For winning the reward challenge, Yarden got to block another player from voting at the next Tribal Council; she chose Israel.)
Yarden		Ilana			Nikol					~~Regev~~	Lital	Regev	Regev	Regev	Israel	Asi		Benny	Alina
Idan		Ilana			Nikol					~~Regev~~	Lital	Regev	Regev	Regev	Israel	Ella		Benny	Alina
Alina			Benny			Adi	None (Note: At the Negotiation Cabin before the tribes were switched, Asi and Idan chose one member of the other tribe to lose their vote at the next Tribal Council; they chose Lital and Alina, respectively.)		None (Note: At the Negotiation Cabin, Israel and Yarden chose one member of their tribe to vote at the other tribe's Tribal Council in the place of one of that tribe's members, should their tribe win the tribal immunity challenge; they chose Ella and Ido, respectively. Kapre won the challenge and Ella was sent to Anting Anting's Tribal Council, where she chose to take Alina's vote.)		Lital	Regev	Regev	Regev (Note: For winning the duel, the Cabin Guard voted at the next Tribal Council in the place of the castaway they defeated.)	Israel	Asi		Benny	Israel
Benny			Zohar		None (Note: For losing the duel, this castaway was unable to vote at the next Tribal Council, while the Cabin Guard voted in their stead.)					~~Regev~~	None	Ido	Regev	Regev	Israel	Ella		Alina	
Ella			Zohar			Adi			Ido	~~Regev~~	Yarden	Ido	Alina	Idan	Alina	Benny			
Regev			Zohar			Adi				David	Yarden	Ido	Alina	None					
Ido		Ilana			Nikol		Lital	Lital (Note: Ido played an extra vote advantage, allowing him to cast two ballots during a single vote.)	Lital		Lital	Regev							
Lital		Ilana			Ido		None		Ido		Yarden								
David			Benny			Adi				~~Regev~~									
Semion		Ilana			Nikol		None												
Adi		Ilana	Zohar			Alina	Semion												
Nikol		Ilana			Ido														
Nava																			
Zohar			Benny																
Ilana		Israel			Nikol						Lital								
Dana																			
Penalty (Note: The player who came in last place during the immunity challenge automatically received a penalty vote at the next Tribal Council.)											Benny	Benny	~~Yarden~~	~~Benny~~	Israel			Benny	

Jury vote
Episode #	62			
Day #	37			
Finalist	Idan	Yarden	Israel	Asi
Votes	2–2–1–1 (Note: For violating the laws of survival, one vote was disqualified. As a result, the vote was tied between Asi and Israel; Idan and Yarden joined the jury in a new ballot between Asi and Israel to determine the winner. All The votes from this ballot were not revealed.)			
Juror	Vote			
Alina				
Benny				
Ella				
Regev				
Ido				
Ilana				
Lital				

Jury revote
Episode #	62	
Day #	Finale	
Finalist	Israel	Asi
Votes	6–3	
Juror	Vote	
Yarden		Asi
Idan		Asi
Alina		Asi
Benny	Israel	
Ella	Israel	
Regev		Asi
Ido		Asi
Ilana		Asi
Lital	Israel	
