= 1984 Israel Super Cup =

Maccabi Haifa	Hapoel Lod
1	4
- Date: 6 June 1984
- Venue: Gaon Stadium, Tel Aviv
- Referee: Itzhak Ben-Itzhak
- Attendance: 2,000

The 1984 Israel Super Cup was the 14th Israel Super Cup (19th, including unofficial matches, as the competition wasn't played within the Israel Football Association in its first 5 editions, until 1969), an annual Israel football match played between the winners of the previous season's Top Division and Israel State Cup.

The match was played between Maccabi Haifa, champions of the 1983–84 Liga Leumit and Hapoel Lod, winners of the 1984–85 Israel State Cup.

This was Maccabi Haifa's 2nd Israel Super Cup appearance (including unofficial matches) and Hapoel Lod's first. At the match, played at Maccabi Jaffa's Gaon Stadium, Hapoel Lod won 4–1.

== Match details ==
6 June 1984

Maccabi Haifa	1–4	Hapoel Lod
Armeli 9'		Zaitun 27'; Ben Mamas 42'; Na'aman 50'; Buzaglo 76'

Gaon Stadium, Tel Aviv
Attendance: 2,000
Referee: Itzhak Ben-Itzhak
