= Nava Boker =

Israeli journalist and politician

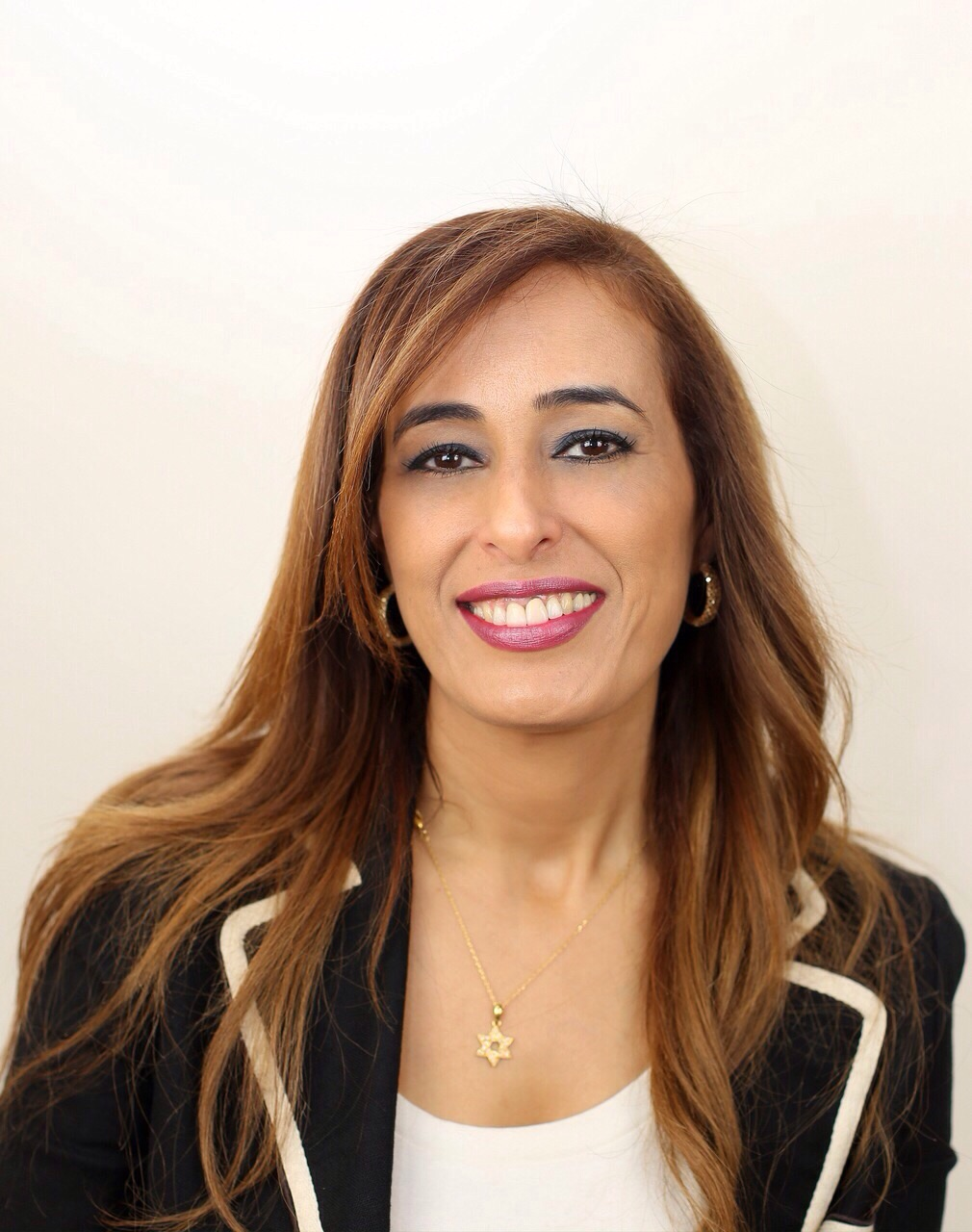
- Boker in 2015

Faction represented in the Knesset
- 2015–2019: Likud

Personal details
- Born: 15 November 1970 (age 55) Israel

Nava Prehi-Boker (Hebrew: נאוה פרחי-בוקר; born 15 November 1970) is an Israeli journalist and politician who served as a member of the Knesset for Likud between 2015 and 2019.

== Biography ==
Nava Boker was born and raised in Pardes Hanna-Karkur. Her parents were Jewish immigrants from Yemen. A journalist by profession, Boker worked for both Yedioth Ahronoth and Ma'ariv, as well as Channel 1. She married and had two daughters, then divorced. At age 27, as a reporter, she met Hadera police chief Lior Boker, and married him. Due to difficulties with obtaining a marriage certificate from the Israeli rabbinate, she married Boker in what she described as an "alternative marriage." In 2010 Lior was killed in the 2010 Mount Carmel forest fire. She subsequently established a foundation to support fire and rescue workers.

Prior to the 2015 Knesset elections she was placed 25th on the Likud list, and was elected to the Knesset as Likud won 30 seats. She lost her seat in the April 2019 elections. She subsequently participated in the 2020 VIP season of Survivor.

Boker lives in Hadera and has two daughters.
