= Ohad Buzaglo =

Israeli footballer and manager

Ohad Buzaglo אוהד בוזגלו
Personal information
- Full name: Ohad Buzaglo
- Date of birth: January 9, 1982 (age 44)
- Place of birth: Holon, Israel

Youth career
- Maccabi Tel Aviv

Senior career*
Years	Team	Apps	(Gls)
2001–2003	Hapoel Lod		
2003–2004	Hapoel Jerusalem		
2004–2005	Maccabi Ramat Amidar		
2005–2006	Hakoah Amidar Ramat Gan		
2006–2008	F.C. Ironi Ariel		

Managerial career
- 2008–2009: F.C. Ironi Ariel
- 2009–2013: Maccabi Amishav Petah Tikva
- 2013: Maccabi Kiryat Malakhi
- 2013–2014: Beitar Kfar Saba
- 2014: Maccabi Kiryat Malakhi
- 2015: Maccabi Ironi Amishav Petah Tikva
- 2015–2016: Sektzia Ness Ziona
- 2016–2017: Hapoel Jerusalem
- 2017–2018: F.C. Kafr Qasim
- 2018: Hapoel Ironi Baqa al-Gharbiyye
- 2021: Maccabi Amishav Petah Tikva
- 2022: Hapoel Qalansawe
- 2023–2024: Maccabi Amishav Petah Tikva
- * Club domestic league appearances and goals

Ohad Buzaglo (Hebrew: אוהד בוזגלו; born 9 January 1982) is a former Israeli footballer turned football manager.

== Personal life ==
Buzaglo is the son of Hani and Jacob Buzaglo- a former player who played in the 70's and 80's in Hapoel Tel Aviv, Beitar Jerusalem and Hapoel Jerusalem. His younger brothers are the footballers Asi Buzaglo, Maor Buzaglo and Almog Buzaglo. Buzaglo is divorced, and has 4 children from his marriage.
