= Jacob Buzaglo =

Israeli footballer (born 1957)

Jacob Buzaglo יעקב בוזגלו
Personal information
- Date of birth: 20 May 1957 (age 69)
- Place of birth: Jerusalem, Israel
- Height: 5 ft 8 in (1.73 m)
- Position: Midfielder

Senior career*
Years	Team	Apps	(Gls)
1974–1979	Hapoel Jerusalem F.C.		
1979–1981	Hapoel Tel Aviv		(4)
1981–1984	Hapoel Lod		
1985–1986	Hapoel Jerusalem		
1986–1987	Beitar Jerusalem	11	(0)

International career
1979	Israel	1	(0)
- * Club domestic league appearances and goals

Jacob Buzaglo (or Yaakov, Hebrew: יעקב בוזגלו; born 1957) is a former Israeli footballer. He is also the father to four professional footballers, including Maor Buzaglo, Almog Buzaglo, Asi Buzaglo and Ohad Buzaglo.

== Honours ==
=== Club ===
Hapoel Tel Aviv

- Israeli Premier League (1): 1980-81

Hapoel Lod F.C.

- Israeli Second Division (1): 1981–82
- Israeli State Cup (1): 1983-84
- Israel Super Cup (1): 1984

Beitar Jerusalem

- Israeli Premier League (1): 1986-87
