= Abraham Buzaglo =

British inventor

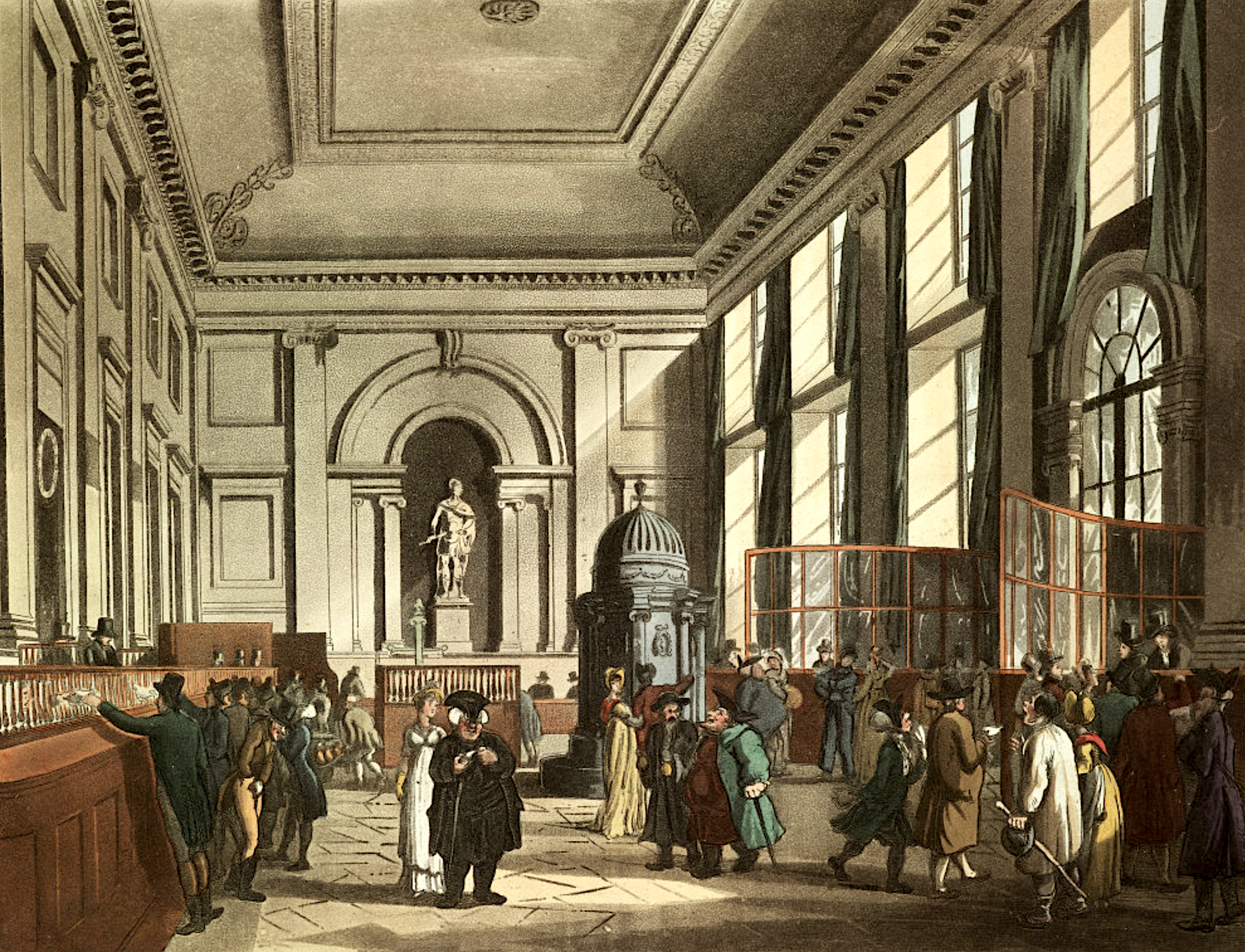
A cast iron Buzaglo stove (centre) at the Bank of England (Thomas Rowlandson and Augustus Pugin, 1788, RIBA)

Abraham Buzaglo (incorrectly called William Buzaglo) was an 18th-century Moroccan-British inventor. He invented a new plan of stoves to heat large public buildings, and a foot-warmer. He later introduced a cure for gout through regular muscular exercise. He praised it so extravagantly in his advertisements that he was satirised as a quack. Despite his detractors, his 'cure' may have been effective. Buzaglo died in London in 1788; his death was reported respectfully.

== Early life ==
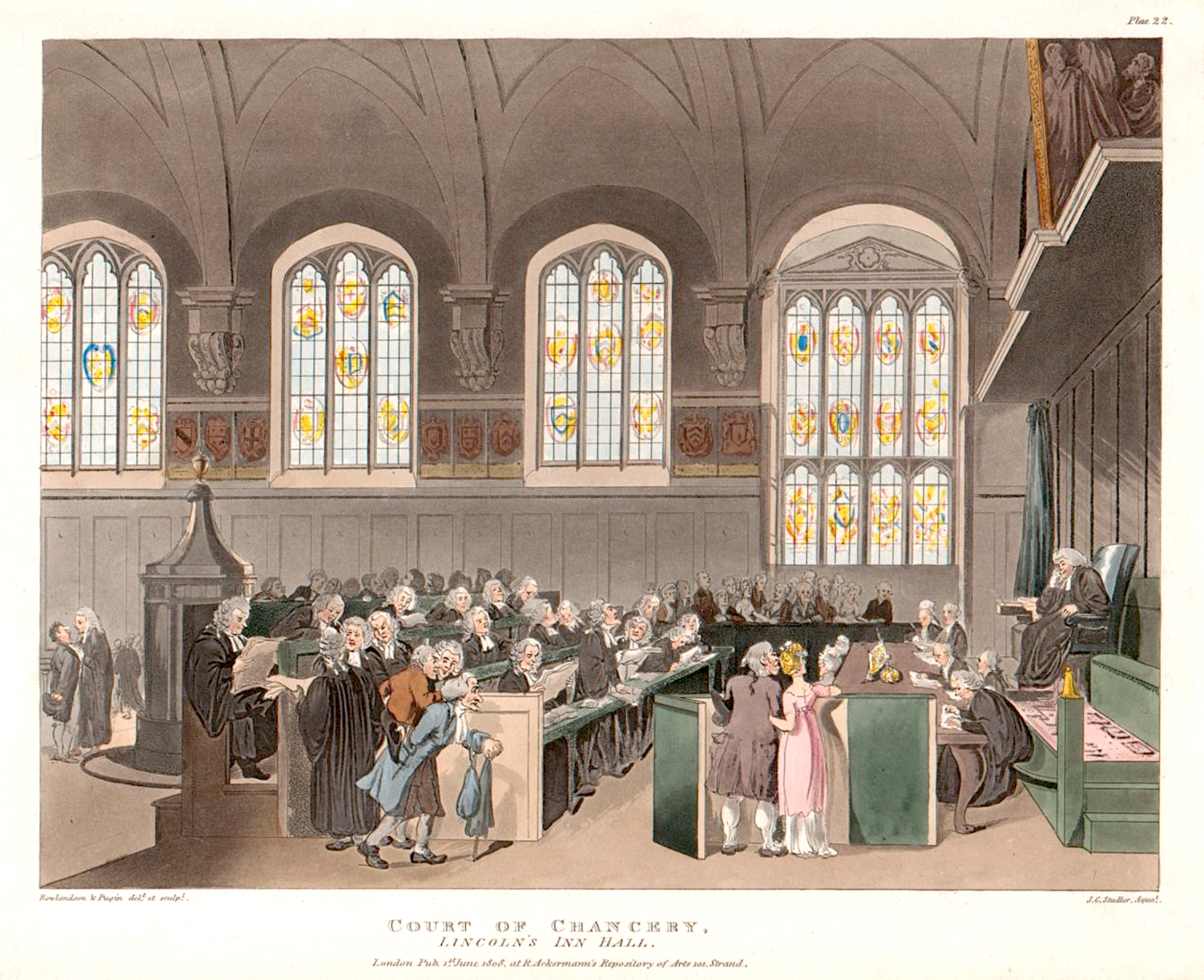
Another specimen (left) warms the Court of Chancery, Lincoln's Inn Old Hall, 1808 (same artists, Yale Center for British Art)

Abraham Buzaglo was born in Morocco in about 1716, into a Sephardic Jewish family, the second son of Moses Buzaglo, who may have been a rabbi. In a brief article in the 1901 edition of the Jewish Encyclopedia he is called William Buzaglo, but this appears to be a mistake. Cecil Roth, who wrote a more detailed note of Buzaglo's life, called him "The last but by no means the least of an extraordinary band of brothers". Getting into trouble with the Moroccan authorities, he spent some years in prison under sentence of death by burning. He arrived in England in 1762 (if not before: his brothers were merchants in London) and, as was permissible in Jewish law, married his niece, Esther Rosa, daughter of his brother Haham Shalom Buzaglo. It appears he was soon successful in business and he became British by denization in 1771.

== The Buzaglo stove ==
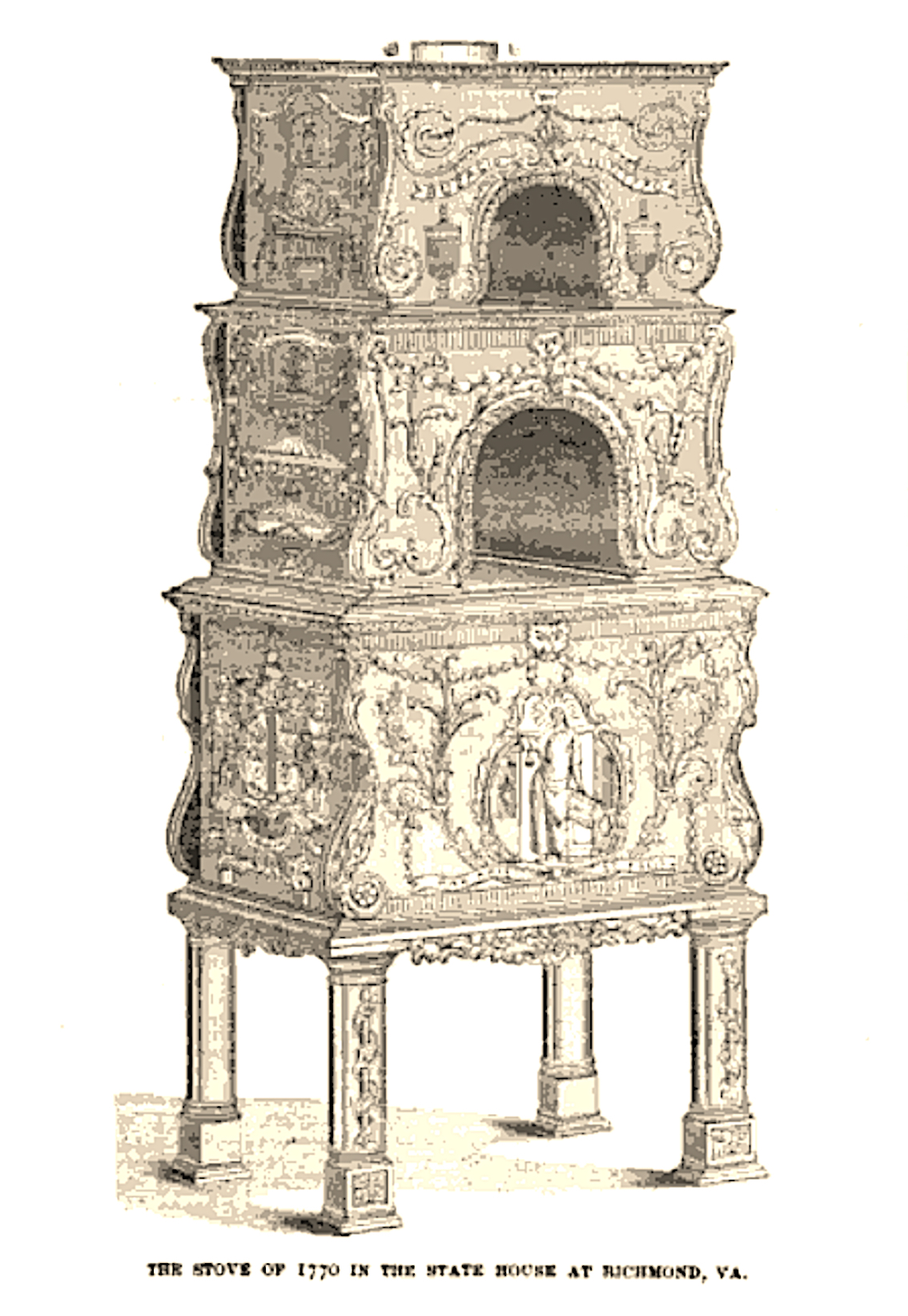
Buzaglo stove, different ornamentation, 7-foot tall, still on display in Virginia

Winters being cold in England and heating inadequate ("a man roasted one part of his anatomy in front of a coal fire while his posterior was freezing"), Buzaglo turned his mind to improvements. On 23 April 1765 he was granted a patent for 'Machine for warming rooms equally in every part and without offensive smell, by means of a coal fire'.

This machine, commonly called a Buzaglo, consisted of a cast iron superstructure containing a coal-fired stove. Unlike an ordinary coal fire, where the air passed upwards through coals burning on a grate, hence sending smoke and most of the heat up the chimney, it worked on an opposite principle. The air was sucked downwards through the burning coals, under the floor in pipes, and hence up a chimney. Thus the fire tended to consume its own smoke, the floor was heated, and so was the cast iron work of the stove, which was enormous, and behaved like a radiator.

As an added attraction it could be, and was, cast into aesthetically pleasing shapes. Benjamin Franklin, who visited London, noticed two specimens, one in the Great Hall of the Bank of England (see title image), the other in the Hall of Lincoln's Inn. Franklin described them as "temples cast in iron, with columns, cornishes, and every member of elegant architecture". Another specimen, described as a "seven-foot Chippendale-style marvel" was given by colonial governor Lord Botetourt to the House of Burgesses, Virginia, and can be seen today at Williamsburg Courthouse.

== The Buzaglo foot-warmer ==
Buzaglo's next invention was for "a warming machine made either of copper, brass, tin, pewter, lead, steel, iron-plate, bell or other metal and acting without fire, for the purpose of warming the feet of persons riding in carriages", for which he received a patent in 1769. It may have been an early hot water bottle; an 18th-century description of a medical case said:

... but her feet were still cold. One of those vessels with hot water, contrived for warmth by Buzaglo, was put into the bed toward the feet: and after about an hour, a plentiful sweat came on.

== Gout doctor ==
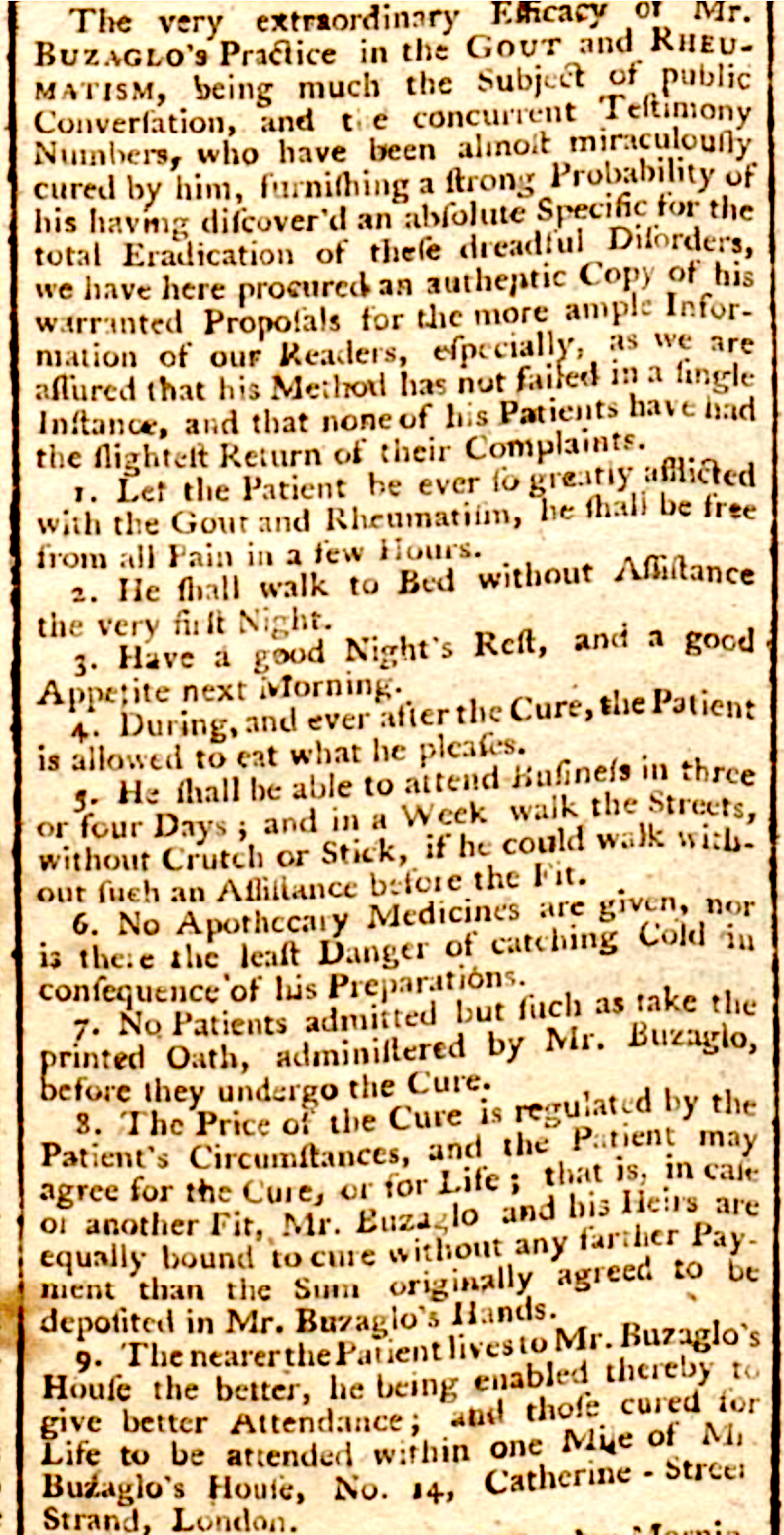
Specimen advertisement for his celebrated gout cure

Gout is a metabolic disorder in which sodium urate is deposited in the joints, notably the big toe, and can be very painful. In Buzaglo's time the complaint was believed to afflict mature, sexually active males, and to be associated with an opulent lifestyle and excess. Paradoxically, there was a widespread belief that gout was a blessing in disguise, because it was Nature's way of eliminating toxins, thus preventing other, worse, afflictions. Propensity to gout was inherited; the disease could be managed, but nor cured. According to Roy Porter "the very idea of some sure-fire cure for gout was widely repudiated as quackish, un-English, almost treasonable".

On 11 February 1779 Buzaglo was granted a patent for 'Machines, instruments and necessaries for exercise (muscular strength and restoring exercise). The concept was to cure gout by vigorous physical exercise and sweating (preferably before a Buzaglo stove). In a treatise Buzaglo claimed to have been "dreadfully afflicted by the Gout" himself until he discovered his cure, which he did by years of reading "the Works of some famous Eastern Hebrew Writers". Buzaglo's method was contrary to prevailing medical ideas but was not absurd; present-day scientific papers on gout have reported the benefits of exercise. Horace Walpole wrote (1777)

Taafe has been cured by Buzaglo and sent for the former, who told him fairly that Buzaglo had removed his gout in four hours, but said that the operation would kill any man less strong.

From the satirical print it appears that patients were required to exercise before a Buzaglo stove, their affected limbs being protectively bound and encased. Nevertheless, Buzaglo got a reputation as a quack or, in more polite language, an 'empiric'. Since patients had to be induced to undergo a vigorous programme of exercise, Buzaglo used inflated advertising to persuade them.

Invalids were assured that they would be rid of pain within a few hours, and completely cured in ten days, and that by similar means corpulency, indigestion, want of appetite, and so on could likewise be cured.

According to Lysons (1795):

Whatever was the real efficacy of his method, the advertisements which he inserted in the newspapers abounded with such absurd puffs, that he was generally considered as an empiric. His patients were to be free from pain, and out of danger in a few hours, perfectly cured within a week or ten days at furthest, to enjoy afterwards a better state of health than before, and to receive additional vigour both in body and mind; he professed also to rectify corpulency, want of appetite, and indigestion, to any wished degree ; and added, that his patients might agree for a perfect cure, or by the month, or by the year, or for life. All this was parodied with much humour by the late facetious Capt. Grose, in a handbill, given with a caricature, entitled, "Patent Exercise, "or Les Caprices de la Goute, Ballet Arthritique."

Buzaglo satirised as a gout doctor

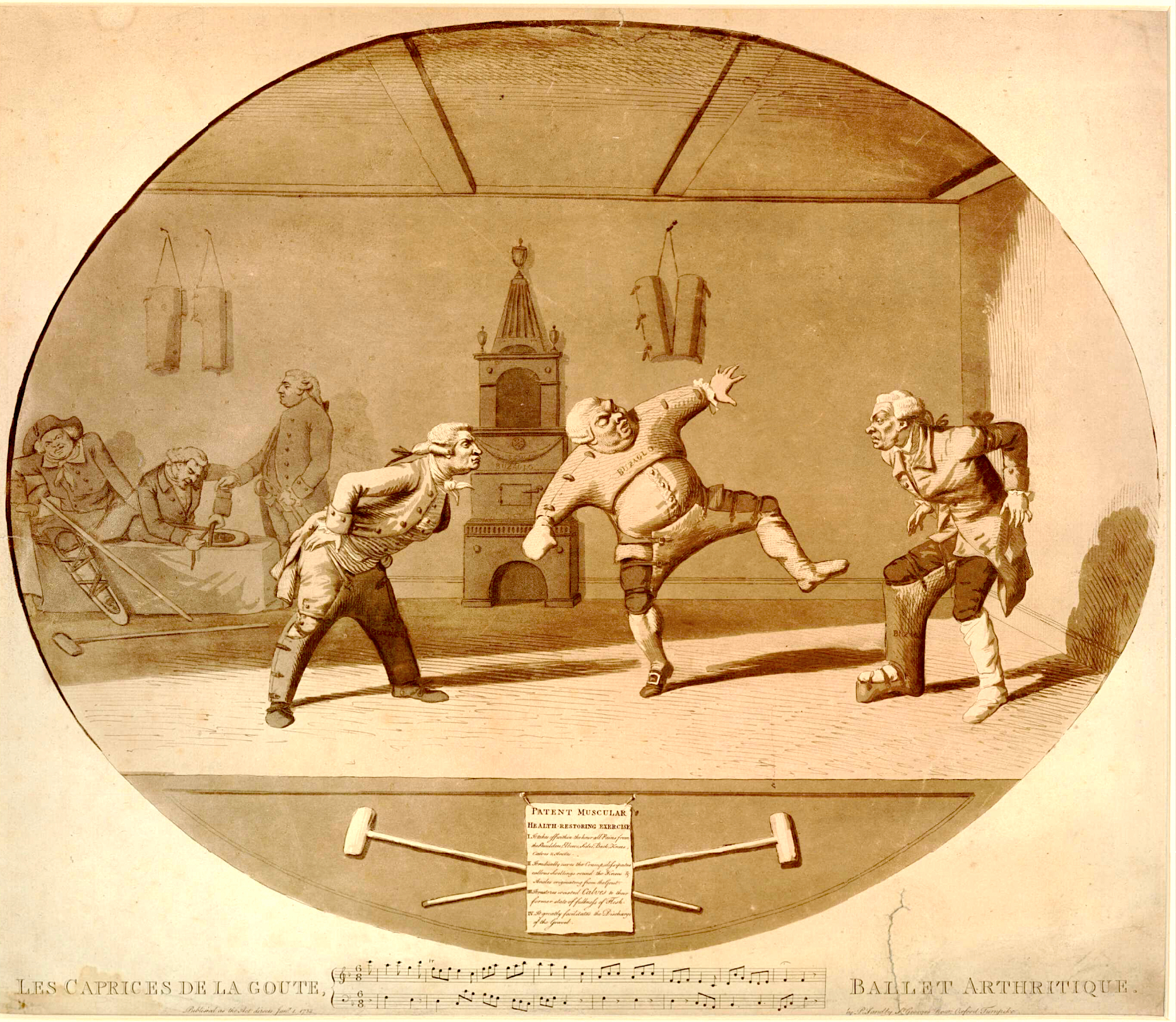
1. Les Caprices de la Goute

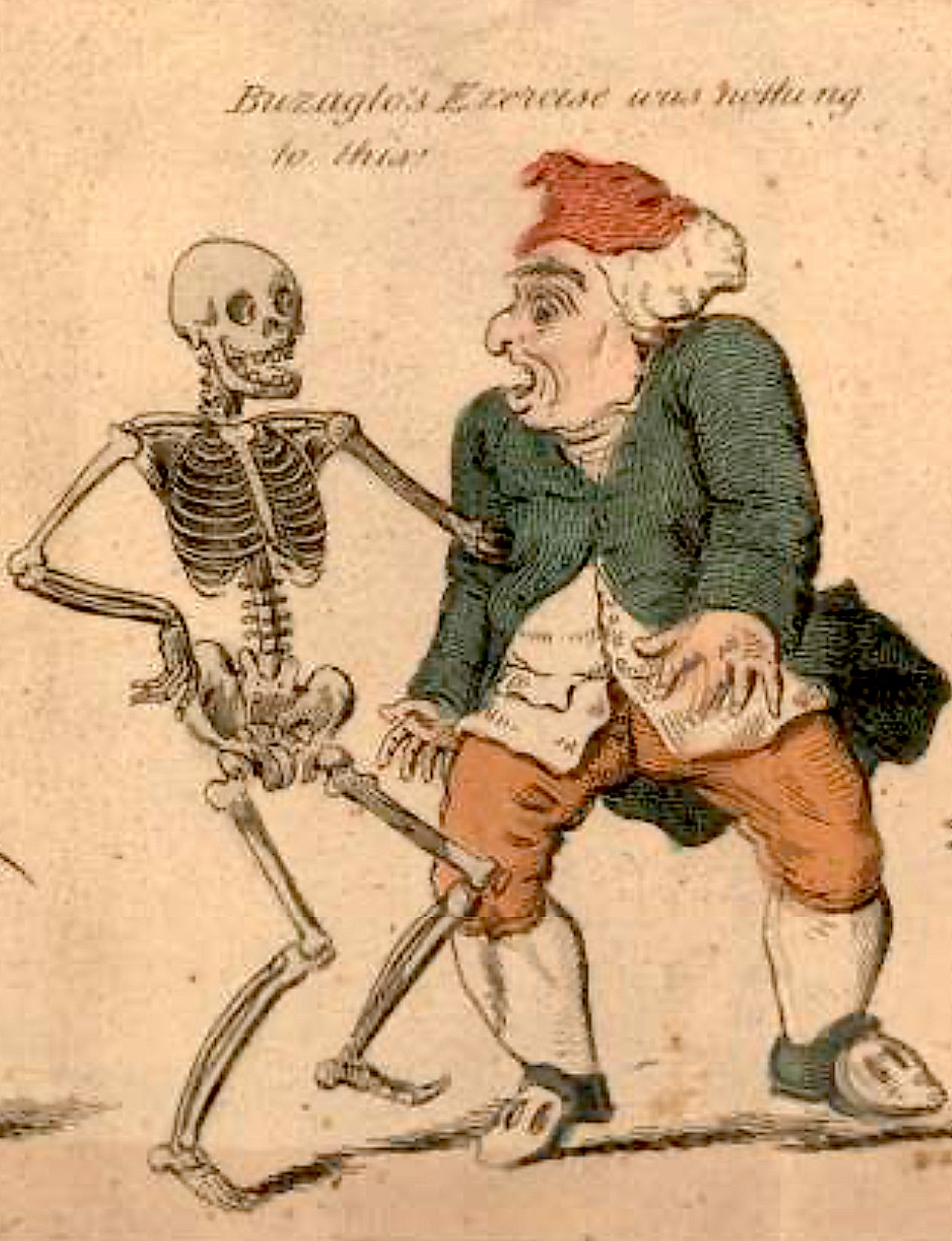
2. Dance of death modernised

1. Paul Sandby, satirical print, British Museum. Patients exercise before a Buzaglo stove (centre background), affected limbs protectively encased. The middle character may denote Buzaglo himself.
2. Isaac Cruikshank after George Moutard Woodward, detail, British Museum. The figure is one of 24 in which a character ends up in a dance with death. In this one (No. 22) a gouty old man exclaims "Buzaglo's Exercise was nothing to this!"

== Death ==
Abraham Buzaglo died at his house in Dean Street, Soho in 1788, aged 72; his death was reported "not disrespectfully" in the press. The Gentleman's Magazine, a prestigious publication, did so under the heading Obituary of considerable persons. He is interred in the Novo burial ground for Portuguese Jews, Mile End Road, London.

== Sources ==
- Buzaglo, A. (1778). A Treatise on the Gout. London: H. Sharp and others.
- Edgerton, Samuel T. (1961). "Heat and Style: Eighteenth-Century House Warming by Stoves". Journal of the Society of Architectural Historians. 20 (1): 20–26. doi:10.2307/988150. JSTOR 988150.
- Hill, J. (1771). Cautions Against the Use of Violent Medicines in Fevers and Instances of the Virtues in Petasite Roots. London: E. & C. Dilly.
- Jablonski, Kyle; Young, Nicholas A; Henry, Caitlin (2020). "Physical activity prevents acute inflammation in a gout model by downregulation of TLR2 on circulating neutrophils as well as inhibition of serum CXCL1 and is associated with decreased pain and inflammation in gout patients". PLoS ONE. 15 (10) e0237520. Bibcode:2020PLoSO..1537520J. doi:10.1371/journal.pone.0237520. PMC 7529261. PMID 33002030.
- Jacobs, Joseph; Lipkind, Goodman (1901). "William Buzaglo". In Singer, Isidore (ed.). Jewish Encyclopedia. Vol. 3. New York: Funk & Wagnalls.
- Loewe, Herbert (1945). "Solomon ben Joseph Buzaglo". Transactions (Jewish Historical Society of England). 16 (1945-1951), pp.: 35–45. JSTOR 29777858.
- Lysons, Daniel (1795). The Environs of London. Vol. III. London: T. Cadell.
- Porter, Roy (1994). "Gout: Framing and Fantasizing Disease". Bulletin of the History of Medicine. 68 (1): 1–28. JSTOR 44451544. PMID 8173299.
- Roth, Cecil (1969). "The Amazing Clan of Buzaglo". Transactions & Miscellanies (Jewish Historical Society of England), 1969-1970. 23: 11–21. JSTOR 29778782.
- "Obituary of considerable persons". The Gentleman's Magazine. Sylvanus Urban. 1788. p. 562.
- Williams, Paul T. (2008). "Effects of diet, physical activity and performance, and body weight on incident gout in ostensibly healthy, vigorously active men". American Journal of Clinical Nutrition. 87 (5): 1480–1487. doi:10.1093/ajcn/87.5.1480. PMC 4090353. PMID 18469274.
