= Armon Ben-Naim =

Israeli footballer

Armon Ben-Naim ארמון בן-נעים
Personal information
- Full name: Armon Ben-Naim
- Date of birth: 6 February 1990 (age 36)
- Place of birth: Petah Tikva, Israel
- Position: Striker

Team information
- Current team: Maccabi Ironi Amishav Petah Tikva
- Number: 9

Youth career
- Hapoel Petah Tikva

Senior career*
Years	Team	Apps	(Gls)
2008–2013	Hapoel Petah Tikva	82	(9)
2010–2011	→ Hapoel Nir Ramat HaSharon	5	(0)
2013–2014	Beitar Kfar Saba	7	(0)
2014	Maccabi Ironi Amishav Petah Tikva	12	(1)

International career
2008	Israel U19	5	(1)
- * Club domestic league appearances and goals

Armon Ben-Naim (Hebrew: ארמון בן-נעים; born 6 February 1990) is an Israeli professional association football player and current under-19 international.

== Biography ==
=== Playing career ===
Ben-Naim made his league debut in a Liga Leumit match against Hapoel Acre on 24 April 2008 when he replaced Daniel Heidman in the 65th minute.
