= Maor Buzaglo =

Israeli footballer (born 1988)

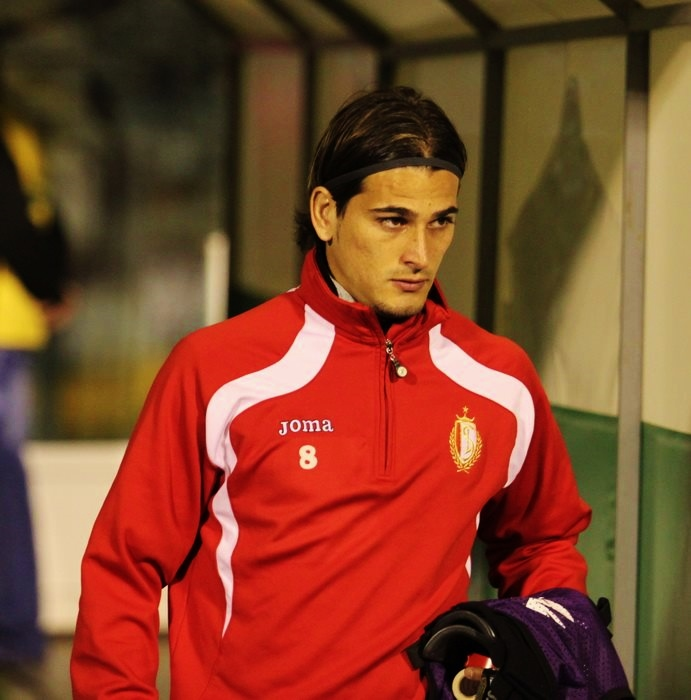
- Buzaglo with Standard Liège in 2011

Personal information
- Full name: Maor Bar Buzaglo
- Date of birth: 14 January 1988 (age 38)
- Place of birth: Holon, Israel
- Height: 1.77 m (5 ft 10 in)
- Position: Midfielder

Youth career
- 1996–1999: Maccabi Tel Aviv
- 1999–2000: Hapoel Tel Aviv
- 2000–2001: Beitar Jerusalem
- 2001–2002: Hapoel Tel Aviv
- 2002–2003: Lyon
- 2003–2006: Maccabi Haifa

Senior career*
Years	Team	Apps	(Gls)
2005–2008	Maccabi Haifa	2	(0)
2006–2007	→ Hapoel Petah Tikva (loan)	21	(5)
2007–2008	→ Bnei Sakhnin (loan)	33	(9)
2008–2011	Maccabi Tel Aviv	84	(17)
2011–2013	Standard Liège	25	(1)
2013–2017	Hapoel Beer Sheva	122	(36)
2017–2018	Maccabi Haifa	5	(0)
2018–2019	Beitar Jerusalem	24	(4)
2019–2020	Hapoel Tel Aviv	21	(3)
Total		337	(75)

International career
2004–2005	Israel U17	12	(9)
2005–2007	Israel U19	34	(21)
2007–2010	Israel U21	15	(8)
2007–2016	Israel	23	(1)
- * Club domestic league appearances and goals

Maor Bar Buzaglo (Hebrew: מאור בוזגלו; born 14 January 1988) is an Israeli former professional footballer who played as a midfielder.

== Early life ==
Buzaglo was born in Holon, Israel, to a Sephardic Jewish family.

He also holds a Portuguese passport, which eased his moved to some European football leagues.

== Club career ==
=== Youth career ===
Buzaglo played for the youth clubs of Maccabi Tel Aviv, Hapoel Tel Aviv and Beitar Jerusalem. In 2002, he went on trial to Juventus and participated in a youth tournament. At this tournament he was scouted by Lyon with whom he signed. After a year in France he returned to Israel joining Maccabi Haifa.

=== Hapoel Petah Tikva (loan) ===
Buzaglo played two matches for Maccabi Haifa, before being loaned out to Hapoel Petah Tikva for the 2006–07 season. In 21 league matches for the club he scored five goals including a hat-trick against Hakoah Amidar Ramat Gan in a 3–2 victory.

=== Bnei Sakhnin (loan) ===
Buzaglo spent the following 2007–08 season on loan at newly promoted club Bnei Sakhnin. He scored nine goals in the season while the club finished fourth in the league earning qualification for the opening rounds of the Intertoto Cup. He was named Discovery of the Year at the end of the season.

=== Maccabi Tel Aviv ===
On 30 July 2008, Buzaglo left Maccabi Haifa and signed to a four-year contract with Maccabi Tel Aviv after long negotiations between Haifa and his father (who is also his agent). In the last game of 2008–09 season Buzaglo tore his knee ligaments forcing him out of action for seven months. He returned midway through the 2009–10 season and went on to score 3 goals and assisting 5. He finished the 2010–11 season with four goals. At the end of the 2010–11 season he criticised the club publicly in an interview to the Israeli press which, along with his father's criticism, resulted in a misconduct fine and suspension from the club. On 26 June club owner Mitchell Goldhar announced that Buzaglo would no longer be part of the first-team's plans and instead be placed on the transfer list.

=== Standard Liège ===
On 19 August 2011, Buzaglo signed a two-year contract with Belgian club Standard Liège for a transfer fee of €440,000. In his first season with the club he made ten caps without any goals or assists. In his second and last season with the club he made 21 caps with a goal and two assists to his name.

=== Hapoel Be'er Sheva ===
On 1 July 2013, Buzaglo signed a one-year contract with Hapoel Be'er Sheva, with option for two more years. In his first season at Be'er Sheva, he scored ten goals and assisted 14 becoming the highest assist provider of the 2013–14 season. On 15 September 2016, Buzaglo scored the second goal versus Inter Milan at San Siro in a Europa League match, which lead to a 2–0 victory for his team (Hapoel Be'er Sheva 5–2 Inter Milan on aggregate).

=== Maccabi Haifa ===
In December 2017 Buzaglo re-injured one of his ACLs after a long period of recuperation, meaning that he would be unable to participate in the rest of the season as a Maccabi Haifa player.

=== Beitar Jerusalem ===
In August 2018, Buzaglo signed for Beitar Jerusalem. Still not fully fit following the knee injury that had kept him out during the previous season, it was expected that he would be able to resume full training after a month. The transfer was subject to an agreement between the clubs that the contract would be cancelled if Buzaglo were to suffer a recurrence of the injury. He scored his first goal at Beitar Jerusalem on 5 November 2018 with a free kick from 20 meters against Maccabi Haifa. On 21 May 2019, Buzaglo scored twice in a friendly match versus Atlético Madrid, at the Teddy Stadium of Jerusalem, where Beitar finished with a 2–1 win.

=== Hapoel Tel Aviv ===
On 29 June 2019, Buzaglo signed at Hapoel Tel Aviv for two years.

=== Retirement ===
Buzaglo announced his retirement from playing in January 2022, aged 34.

== International career ==
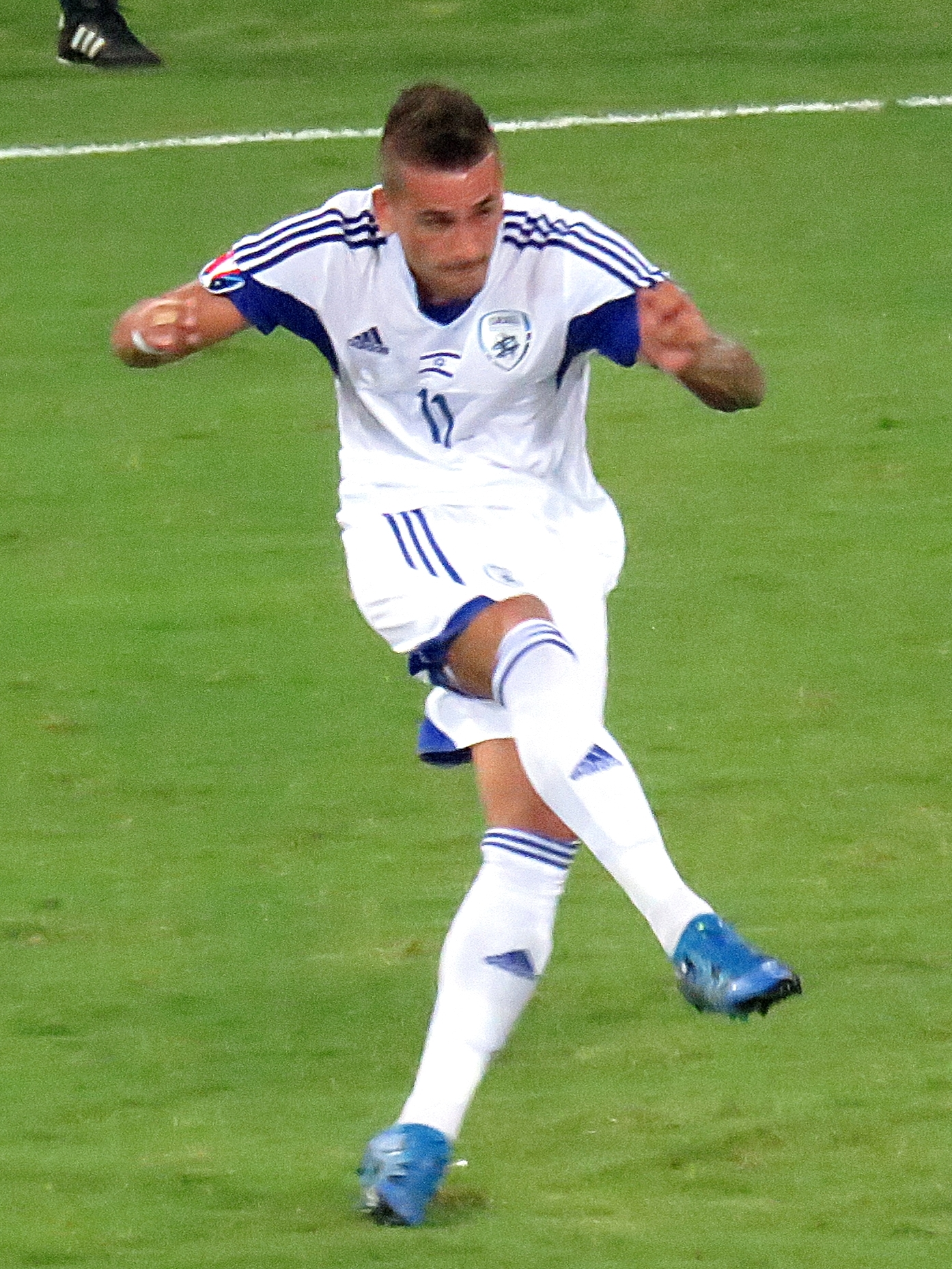
Buzaglo playing for Israel in 2015

Buzaglo has represented his country from a very early age, from the U17 level to the senior team. At U19 level, Buzaglo scored 21 goals in 34 matches, including four goals in one game against Denmark in a Milk Cup match in 2007. For the Israel U21 team, Buzaglo scored three times in eight matches.

Buzaglo made his senior international debut for the Israel national team against the Russia in a EURO 2008 qualifier on 17 November 2007.

== Personal life ==
Maor's father is Jacob Buzaglo a former Israeli footballer who played in the 70's and 80's for Hapoel Tel Aviv, and Beitar Jerusalem. Older brother Asi Buzaglo is also a former footballer, youngest brother Almog Buzaglo is an active player, and eldest brother Ohad Buzaglo is a football manager.

Maor is married to Miran Nimni, Israeli former footballer Avi Nimni's niece (as well as his former manager at Maccabi Tel Aviv). They had their first set of twins in 2012, and another set of twins in 2017.

== Career statistics ==
Appearances and goals by club, season and competition
Club	Season	League		National cup		League cup		Super cup		Europe		Total	
Club	Season	Apps	Goals	Apps	Goals	Apps	Goals	Apps	Goals	Apps	Goals	Apps	Goals
Maccabi Haifa	2005–06	2	0	0	0	5	0	–		0	0	7	0
Hapoel Petah Tikva (loan)	2006–07	21	5	1	0	1	0	–		0	0	23	5
Bnei Sakhnin (loan)	2007–08	33	9	1	1	8	0	–		0	0	42	10
Maccabi Tel Aviv	2008–09	33	9	1	0	8	3	–		0	0	42	12
Maccabi Tel Aviv	2009–10	17	4	1	0	1	0	–		0	0	19	4
Maccabi Tel Aviv	2010–11	34	4	1	0	6	1	–		6	0	47	5
Maccabi Tel Aviv	Total	84	17	3	0	15	4	0	0	6	0	108	21
Standard Liège	2011–12	5	0	1	0	–		–		4	0	10	0
Standard Liège	2012–13	20	1	1	0	–		–		0	0	21	1
Standard Liège	Total	25	1	2	0	0	0	0	0	4	0	31	1
Hapoel Be'er Sheva	2013–14	35	10	4	1	–		–		0	0	39	11
Hapoel Be'er Sheva	2014–15	35	13	5	1	3	0	–		2	1	45	15
Hapoel Be'er Sheva	2015-16	25	6	5	0	5	0	–		2	0	37	6
Hapoel Be'er Sheva	2016-17	27	7	1	0	3	2	2	1	11	2	44	12
Hapoel Be'er Sheva	Total	122	36	15	2	11	2	2	1	15	3	165	44
Maccabi Haifa	2017–18	5	0	0	0	1	0	0	0	0	0	6	0
Beitar Jerusalem	2018–19	24	4	1	0	0	0	0	0	0	0	25	4
Hapoel Tel Aviv	2019–20	21	3	2	0	5	0	0	0	0	0	28	3
Career total		337	75	25	3	46	6	2	1	25	3	435	88

== Honours ==
Maccabi Haifa

- Israeli Premier League: 2005–06

Maccabi Tel Aviv

- Toto cup top Division: 2008–09

Hapoel Be'er Sheva

- Israeli Premier League: 2015–16, 2016–17
- Israel Super Cup: 2016
- Toto cup top Division: 2016–17

Individual

- Israeli Premier League Discovery of the Year: 2007–08
- Israeli Premier League Top Assist Provider: 2013–14 (14), 2014–15 (10)
