= Courthouse (Colonial Williamsburg) =

Historic courthouse in Virginia, US

- Colonial Williamsburg Courthouse
- U.S. National Historic Landmark District – Contributing property
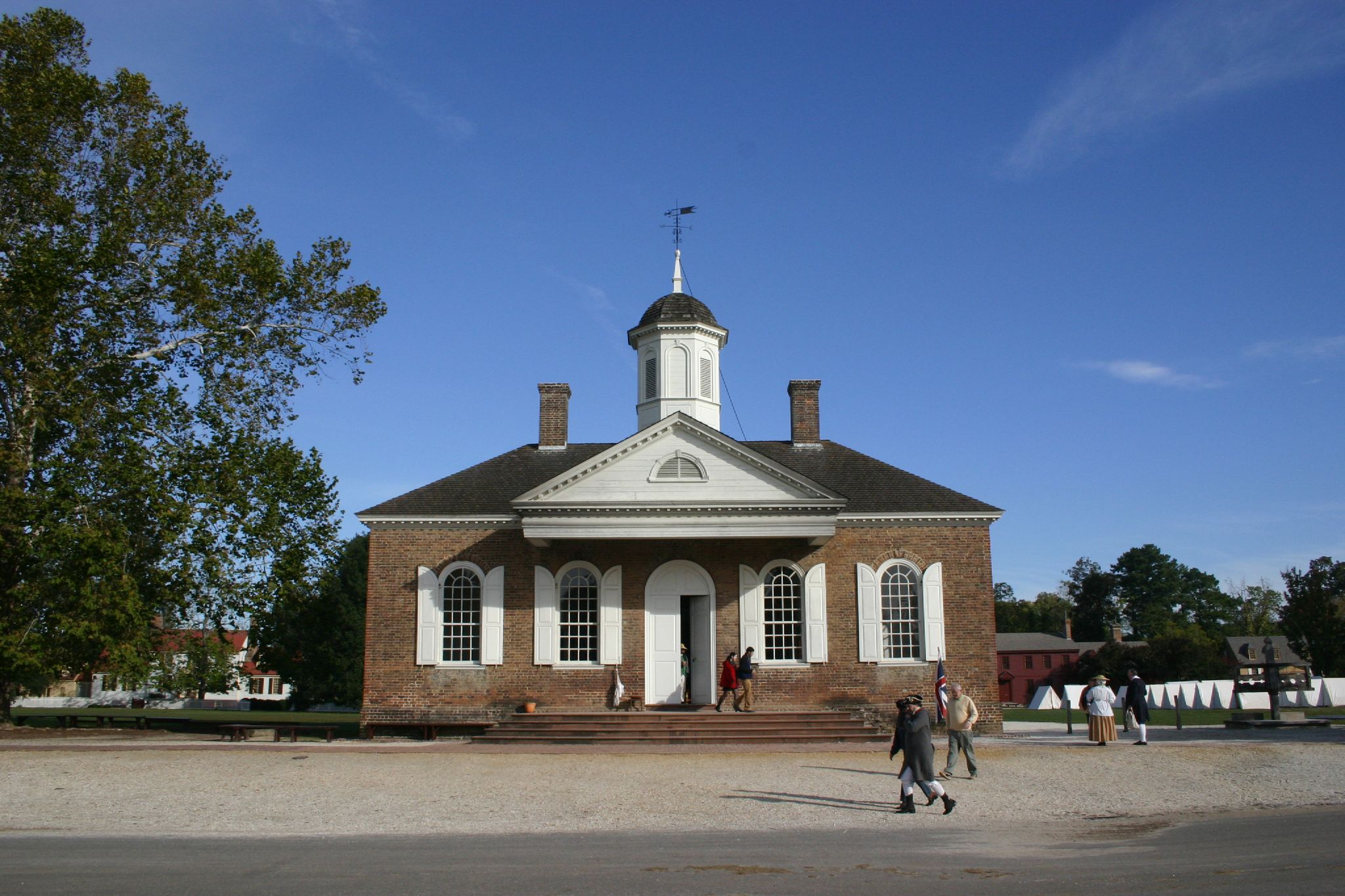
- The courthouse in Colonial Williamsburg

- Location within Virginia Location within the United States
- Interactive map showing the location of Colonial Williamsburg Courthouse
- Location: Duke of Gloucester Street between Palace Green and Queen Street
- Coordinates: 37°16′17.38″N 76°42′0.82″W
- Built: 1771
- Architectural style: Georgian style
- Part of: Williamsburg Historic District (ID66000925)
- Designated NHLDCP: October 15, 1966

The Colonial Williamsburg Courthouse was constructed from 1770 to 1771 in the Georgian style. The courthouse is located facing Market Square with Duke of Gloucester Street running directly behind it. The property was acquired by Colonial Williamsburg in 1928, and was added to the National Register as a contributing property to the Williamsburg Historic District on October 15, 1966.

The courthouse once housed two separate court systems, one being the James City County Court, responsible for carrying out county cases, and the other, the Hustings Court, responsible for the city cases. The courthouse was built with red bricks with white wooden trim-boards and long arched windows with white shutters. A projected portico is located over one of the entrances and is unique in Georgian architecture. The hipped roof rests on an entablature with dentil moldings. The roof is pierced on both sides by a chimney and a central octagonal drum capped with a dome and a spire.

The courthouse was the site where Benjamin Waller read aloud the Declaration of Independence on July 25, 1776, after it arrived from Philadelphia.

The building was used as a hospital for the Confederate Army after the Battle of Williamsburg.
