= Asi Buzaglo =

Israeli footballer

Asaf (Asi) Buzaglo אסף (אסי) בוזגלו
Personal information
- Full name: Asaf (Asi) Buzaglo
- Date of birth: December 3, 1982 (age 43)
- Place of birth: Holon, Israel
- Height: 1.68 m (5 ft 6 in)
- Position: Right back

Youth career
- Maccabi Tel Aviv

Senior career*
Years	Team	Apps	(Gls)
2001–2002	Hapoel Lod		
2002–2003	Hapoel Tzafririm Holon		
2003–2004	Hapoel Ra'anana		
2004–2005	Maccabi Netanya		
2005–2006	Hapoel Haifa		
2006–2007	Hakoah Ramat Gan	9	(0)
2007–2008	Hapoel Rishon LeZion	28	(2)
2008–2009	Hapoel Jerusalem	24	(3)
2009–2010	Hapoel Petah Tikva	5	(0)
2010–2012	Maccabi Amishav Petah Tikva	52	(5)
2012–2013	Maccabi Bat Yam	15	(1)
2013–2014	Beitar Kfar Saba	11	(1)
2014	Kafr Qasim	7	(1)
2014–2017	Hapoel Ashkelon	52	(0)
2017–2018	Hapoel Marmorek	1	(0)
- * Club domestic league appearances and goals as of 8 May 2014

Asi Buzaglo (Hebrew: אסי בוזגלו; born 3 December 1982) is a former Israeli footballer.

== Personal life ==
Asi's father is Jacob Buzaglo a former player who played in the 70's and 80's in Hapoel Tel Aviv, Beitar Jerusalem and Hapoel Jerusalem and his younger brother is Maor Buzaglo Older brother Ohad Buzaglo and younger brother Almog Buzaglo also play football.

== Honours ==
- Liga Leumit:
  - Runner-up (2): 2004–05, 2015–16
- Toto Cup (Leumit):
  - Winner (1): 2004–05
- Liga Alef:
  - Winner (1): 2014-15
