= Survivor Greece season 10 =

Survivor: All-Star
- Season 10
- Presented by: Giorgos Lianos
- No. of days: 184
- No. of castaways: 38
- Winner: Sakis Katsoulis
- Runner-up: Nikos Bartzis
- Location: La Romana, Dominican Republic
- No. of episodes: 118

Release
- Original network: Skai TV
- Original release: January 8 – July 11, 2023

Additional information
- Filming dates: January 5 – July 11, 2023

Season chronology
- ← Previous; Season 9 Next → Season 11

Survivor 10, also known as Survivor: All-Star, was the tenth season of the popular reality show Survivor Greece. The season premiered on January 8, 2023, and was broadcast on Skai TV in Greece and simulcast on Sigma TV in Cyprus. Giorgos Lianos returned as the host. Celebrating the show's tenth anniversary milestone, the season featured 38 returning competitors from seasons five to nine, who have to survive on a deserted beach, at the exotic La Romana in Dominican Republic, having their luggage, the necessary clothes and basic food supplies.

== Contestants ==
The game started with 26 returning castaways from seasons 5 to 9. Twelve more players were added to the cast, make it a total of 38 contestants. The third week (episode 9), three new contestants entered the game: George "Koro" Koromi for the Diasimoi team, Chris Stamoulis and Ria Kolovou for the Machites team. The fourth week (episode 13), Sozon Palaistros-Charos was added to the blue team. The seventh week (episode 28) Eleftheria Eleftheriou, Evridiki Papadopoulou and Christina Kefala were added to the Diasimoi team and Nikolas Agorou, Panagiotis Konstantinidis and Jo Maridaki were added to Machites team. The eighth week (episode 33) Giorikas Pilidis was added to Machites team and Nikoleta Mavridi to the Diasimoi team, which were, the last additions to the cast.

List of Survivor: All-Star contestants
| Contestant | Original tribe | Switched tribe | Switched tribe 2 | Switched tribe 3 | Merged tribe | Personal Statistics | Finish |
|---|---|---|---|---|---|---|---|
| Vrisiida Andriotou; 26, Thessaloniki, Model; Survivor (2022) | Machites | | | | | 50% | Walked; Episode 3 |
| Periklis Kondylatos; 43, Athens, Jewelry Designer; Survivor (2021) | Machites | | | | | 0% | 1st Voted Out; Episode 4 |
| Evridiki Valavani; 35, Athens, Sports Journalist; Survivor (2017) | Diasimoi | | | | | 31% | 2nd Voted Out; Episode 8 |
| Carolina Jacqueline Kalyva; 33, Toronto, Pilates Instructor; Survivor (2021) | Machites | | | | | 33% | 3rd Voted Out; Episode 12 |
| Asimina Chatziandreou; 23, Athens, Football player Survivor (2022) | Diasimoi | | | | | 55% | Expelled; Episode 15 |
| Katerina Dalaka; 30, Katerini, Athlete; Survivor (2018), Winner Survivor (2019) | Diasimoi | | | | | 71% | Expelled; Episode 15 |
| Kostas Anagnostopoulos; 38, Athens, Ex-Mercenary; Survivor (2017) | Machites | | | | | 29% | 4th Voted Out; Episode 17 |
| Sozon Palaistros-Charos; 44, Lemnos, Field hockey coach Survivor (2018) | Machites | | | | | 23% | 5th Voted Out; Episode 22 |
| Chris Stamoulis; 34, Thessaloniki, Lawyer, Writer; Survivor (2021) | Machites | | | | | 26% | 6th Voted Out; Episode 27 |
| Costas Papadopoulos; 39, Russia, Pastry Chef; Survivor (2021) | Diasimoi | | | | | 45% | 7th Voted Out; Episode 32 |
| Christina Kefala; 30, Athens, Influencer; Survivor (2021) | Diasimoi | | | | | 15% | 8th Voted Out; Episode 37 |
| Stathis Schizas; 30, Athens, Entrepreneur; Winner Survivor (2022) | Diasimoi | | | | | 71% | Walked; Episode 38 |
| Evridiki Papadopoulou; 38, Haidari, Jewelry designer Survivor (2022) | Diasimoi | | | | | 33% | 9th Voted Out; Episode 42 |
| Georgia Jo Maridaki; 20, Sitia, Veterinary student Survivor (2022) | Machites | | | | | 48% | 10th Voted Out; Episode 47 |
| Nikoleta Mavridi; 28, Athens, Dancer; Survivor (2021) | Diasimoi | | | | | 31% | 11th Voted Out; Episode 52 |
| Georgios Pilidis; 23, Athens, Wrestling Champion; Survivor (2022) | Machites | Blue | | | | 65% | Expelled; Episode 54 |
| Ilias Gotsis; 33, Athens, Personal Trainer; Winner Survivor (2018) | Machites | Blue | | | | 62% | Expelled; Episode 54 |
| Eleni Haberi; 28, Volos, Gymnast; Survivor (2021) | Diasimoi | Blue | | | | 50% | 12th Voted Out; Episode 57 |
| Eleftheria Eleftheriou; 33, Paralimni, Singer; Survivor (2021) | Diasimoi | Blue | | | | 29% | 13th Voted Out; Episode 62 |
| Afroditi Skafida; 40, Athens, Trainer; Survivor (2019) | Diasimoi | Red | Red | | | 57% | Expelled; Episode 65 |
| Panagiotis Konstantinidis; 29, Athens, Nutritionist; Survivor (2019) | Machites | Red | Red | | | 35% | 14th Voted Out; Episode 69 |
| Evi Saltaferidou; 32, Thessaloniki, Fitness Coach; Survivor (2018) | Machites | Red | Red | | | 46% | 15th Voted Out; Episode 74 |
| Stelios Hantampakis; 37, Volos, TV Host, Entrepreneur; Survivor (2017) | Diasimoi | Red | Red | | | 50% | Walked; Episode 78 |
| Nikolas Agorou; 31, Athens, Farmer; Survivor (2018) | Machites | Blue | Blue | | | 44% | 16th Voted Out; Episode 79 |
| Ria Kolovou; 34, Edessa, Entrepreneur; Survivor (2019) | Machites | Blue | Blue | | | 41% | 17th Voted Out; Episode 82 |
| Giorgos Koromi; 35, Athens, Entrepreneur; Survivor (2021) | Diasimoi | Red | Red | | | 48% | 18th Voted Out; Episode 86 |
| Spyros Martikas; 46, Keratsini, Pharmacist; Survivor (2022) | Diasimoi | Blue | Blue | | | 36% | 19th Voted Out; Episode 89 |
| Takis Karagounias; 49, Aigio, Mercenary; Survivor (2022) | Machites | Red | Red | | | 50% | 20th Voted Out; Episode 94 |
| Giorgos Asimakopoulos; 31, Patras, Entrepreneur; Survivor (2021) | Machites | Blue | Blue | | | 39% | 21st Voted Out; Episode 98 |
| Melina Metaxa; 36, Limassol, Dancer, Gymnast; Survivor (2018) | Machites | Blue | Red | | | 37% | 22nd Voted Out; Episode 102 |
| Konstantinos Vasalos; 33, Athens, Personal trainer Survivor (2017) | Machites | Red | Red | Red | Merged Tribe | 42% | 23rd Voted Out; Episode 106 |
| Ilias Bogdanos; 31, Athens, Singer; Survivor (2021) | Machites | Red | Blue | Blue | Merged Tribe | 54% | 24th Voted Out; Episode 108 |
| Stavroula Chrysaeidi; 26, Athens, Track and field champion Survivor (2022) | Diasimoi | Red | Blue | Red | Merged Tribe | 61% | 25th Voted Out; Episode 110 |
| Stella Andreadou; 31, Thessaloniki, Physical Teacher; Survivor (2022) | Machites | Blue | Blue | Blue | Merged Tribe | 57% | 26th Voted Out; Episode 114 |
| Marios Priamos Ioannidis; 36, Nicosia, Cyprus, Diving instructor Survivor (2017) | Diasimoi | Blue | Blue | Blue | Merged Tribe | 46% | Quarter-final; Episode 117 |
| Marialena Roumelioti; 27, Athens, Personal Trainer; Survivor (2021) | Machites | Red | Red | Red | Merged Tribe | 51% | Semi-final; Episode 117 |
| Nikos Bartzis; 28, Corinth, Farmer; Survivor (2021) | Diasimoi | Blue | Blue | Blue | Merged Tribe | 41% | Runner up Episode 118 |
| Sakis Katsoulis; 32, Euboea, Entrepreneur; Winner Survivor (2021) | Diasimoi | Red | Red | Red | Merged Tribe | 74% | Sole Survivor; Episode 118 |

== Voting history ==
=== Nominations table ===
| | Original tribes | | | | | | | | | | | | | | | | | | | | | | | | | | | | | | | | | | | | | Switched tribes | | | | | | | | | | | | | | | | | | | | | | | | | | | | | | | | Merged tribe | | | | | | | | |
| Week # | 1 | | | | | 2 | | | 3 | | | 4 | | | | 5 | | | 6 | | | 7 | | | 8 | | | 9 | | | | 10 | | | 11 | | | 12 | | | | 13 | | | 14 | | | 15 | | 16 | | | 17 | | | 18 | | 19 | | 20 | | 21 | | 22 | | | 23 | | | 24 | | | 25 | | | | 26 | |
| Episode # | 1 | 2 | 3 | | | 5 | 6 | 7 | 9 | 10 | 11 | 13 | 14 | 15 | | 18 | 19 | 20 | 23 | 24 | 25 | 28 | 29 | 30 | 33 | 34 | 35 | 38 | | 39 | 40 | 43 | 44 | 45 | 48 | 49 | 50 | 53 | 54 | | 55 | 58 | 59 | 60 | 63 | 64 | 65 | 66 | 67 | 71 | 72 | 73 | 76 | 77 | 78 | 80 | 81 | 84 | 85 | 87 | 88 | 91 | 92 | 95 | 96 | 97 | 99 | 100 | 101 | 104 | 105 | 106 | 107 | 108 | 109 | 110 | 113 | 114 |
|---|---|---|---|---|---|---|---|---|---|---|---|---|---|---|---|---|---|---|---|---|---|---|---|---|---|---|---|---|---|---|---|---|---|---|---|---|---|---|---|---|---|---|---|---|---|---|---|---|---|---|---|---|---|---|---|---|---|---|---|---|---|---|---|---|---|---|---|---|---|---|---|---|---|---|---|---|---|---|
| Tribe | Machites | Diasimoi | Machites | | Machites | Diasimoi | Diasimoi | Machites | Machites | Diasimoi | Machites | Machites | Machites | Machites | Diasimoi | Machites | Machites | Diasimoi | Machites | Machites | Diasimoi | Diasimoi | Machites | Diasimoi | Diasimoi | Machites | Diasimoi | Diasimoi | | Diasimoi | Machites | Machites | Machites | Machites | Diasimoi | Machites | Diasimoi | Blue | Blue | | Blue | Blue | Blue | Blue | Red | Blue | None | Blue | Blue | Blue | Red | Red | Red | Blue | Red | Blue | Blue | Red | Red | Blue | Blue | Red | Red | Red | Blue | Blue | Red | Blue | Blue | Sakis | Marialena | Stella | Sakis | Sakis | Sakis | Marios | Sakis | Sakis |
| Nominated by MVP | | | | | | | | | | | | | | | | | | | | | | | | | | | | | | | | | | | | | | | | | | | | | | | | | | | | | | | | | | | | | | | | | Ilias B. | | Stavroula | | Marios | | | | | | | | | |
| Nominated by Group | Pericles | Costas | Kostas; ~~Vrisiida~~* | George | None | Costas | Evridiki; Spyros | Carolina | Takis | Spyros | Carolina; George | Chris | Kostas; Evi | Ria | None | Chris | Sozon; Marialena | Costas | Chris | Melina; George | Spyros | Costas | Melina | George K. Afroditi | Christina | Panagiotis | Evridiki; Eleni | None | Eleftheria | Evridiki; Spyros | George | George | Panagiotis; Jo; Konstantinos | Melina | Nikoleta | Takis | Eleftheria; Spyros; George K. | Eleftheria | None | Spyros; Nikolas | Eleni | Eleftheria | Nikos; Spyros | Ria | Panagiotis; Takis | Spyros | None | Nikos | George | Spyros | Evi; George K. | Takis; Melina | ~~Stelios~~* | Nikolas; Spyros | George K. Takis | Spyros | Ria; George; Nikos | George K. | Melina; Takis | Spyros | George; Ilias B. Nikos | Konstantinos | Takis; Melina | Konstantinos | George | Nikos | Melina | Nikos | Stella; Ilias B. | Nikos | Konstantinos | Stavroula | Nikos | Stavroula | Nikos | Sakis | Nikos | Stella |
| Votes | 12-1 | 8-2-2-1 | 10-2-1 | 7-5 | None | 5-3-3-1-1 | 8-3-1-1 | 7-4 | 7-6 | 6-5-1-1 | 5-4-3-1 | 10-1-1-1 | 4-3-2-2-1-1 | 7-6 | None | 6-3-3 | 7-4-1 | 10-1 | 8-3 | 10-1 | 7-3-1 | 6-4-2-1-1 | 12-1 | 6-4-2-2 | 9-4-1 | 6-5-1-1-1 | 7-4-3 | None | 6-4-2 | 9-2-1 | 9-3-2 | 7-3-2-2 | 6-4-4 | 6-3-1-1-1-1-1 | 4-3-3-1 | 6-5-1-1 | 5-3-3 | 10-2 | None | 8-2 | 5-3-2 | 8-1 | 3-3-2-1 | 4-3-1-1 | 5-5 | 8-1 | None | 7-2 | 5-4 | 6-3 | 3-3-1-1 | 3-3-1-1 | 3-2-1-1 | 3-3-1-1-1 | 4-2 | 5-3 | 6-1-1 | 3-2-1 | 3-2-1 | 4-2-1 | 3-2-2 | 3-2 | 3-2 | 3-1 | 4-2 | 4-2 | 3-1 | 4-1 | 2-2-1 | 3-2-1-1-1 | 3-2-2-1 | 4-3-1 | 4-2-1 | 5-2 | 4-1-1 | 4-1-1 | 4-1 | 3-2 |
| Against public vote | Pericles; Costas; Kostas; George | | | | None | Costas; Evridiki; Spyros; Carolina | | | Takis; Spyros; Carolina; George | | | Chris; Kostas; Evi; Ria | | | | Chris; Sozon; Marialena; Costas | | | Chris; Melina; George; Spyros | | | Costas; Melina; George K. Afroditi | | | Christina; Panagiotis; Evridiki; Eleni | | | None | Eleftheria; Evridiki; Spyros; George | | | George; Panagiotis; Jo; Konstantinos; Melina | | | Nikoleta; Takis; Eleftheria; Spyros; George K. | | | Eleftheria; Spyros; Nikolas; Eleni | | | | Eleftheria; Spyros; Nikos; Ria | | | Takis; Panagiotis; Spyros; Nikos; George | | | | | Spyros; Evi; George K. Takis; Melina | | | Nikolas; Spyros; George K. Takis | | | Spyros; Ria; George; Nikos | | George K. Melina; Takis | | Spyros; George; Ilias B. Nikos | | Konstantinos; Takis; Melina | | Konstantinos; George; Nikos | | | Melina; Nikos; Stella; Ilias B. | | | Nikos; Konstantinos; Stavroula | | | Nikos; Stavroula; Ilias B. | | Nikos; Sakis; Stavroula | | Nikos; Marios; Stella | |
| Eliminated | Pericles; Fewest votes by public to save | | | | Vrisiida; Walked | Evridiki; Fewest votes by public to save | | | Carolina; Fewest votes by public to save | | | Kostas; Fewest votes by public to save | | | Asimina; Katerina; Expelled | Sozon; Fewest votes by public to save | | | Chris; Fewest votes by public to save | | | Costas; Fewest votes by public to save | | | Christina; Fewest votes by public to save | | | Stathis; Walked | Evridiki; Fewest votes by public to save | | | Jo; Fewest votes by public to save | | | Nikoleta; Fewest votes by public to save | | | Ilias G. Giorikas; Expelled | | Eleni; Fewest votes by public to save | | Eleftheria; Fewest votes by public to save | | | | | Afroditi; Expelled | Panagiotis; Fewest votes by public to save | | Evi; Fewest votes by public to save | | | Stelios; Walked | Nikolas; Fewest votes by public to save | | Ria; Fewest votes by public to save | | George K. Fewest votes by public to save | | Spyros; Fewest votes by public to save | | Takis; Fewest votes by public to save | | George; Fewest votes by public to save | | | Melina; Fewest votes by public to save | | | Konstantinos; Fewest votes by public to save | | | Ilias B. Fewest votes by public to save | | Stavroula; Fewest votes by public to save | | Stella; Fewest votes by public to save | |
| Voter | Vote | | | | | | | | | | | | | | | | | | | | | | | | | | | | | | | | | | | | | | | | | | | | | | | | | | | | | | | | | | | | | | | | | | | | | | | | | | | | | |
| Sakis | | Costas | | | | Costas | Evridiki | | | Spyros | | | | | | | | Costas | | | Spyros | Afroditi | | Afroditi | Christina | | Evridiki | | Evridiki | Evridiki | | | | | Nikoleta | | Eleftheria | | | | | | | | Panagiotis | | | | | | Evi | Konstantinos | Konstantinos | | Takis | | | Melina | Melina | | | Konstantinos | Takis | Konstantinos | | | Melina | | | Konstantinos | Konstantinos | Stavroula | Nikos | Stavroula | Nikos | Stavroula | Nikos | Stella |
| Nikos | | Afroditi | | | | Asimina | Asimina | | | Eleni | | | | | | | | Costas | | | Costas | Afroditi | | George K. | Evridiki | | Evridiki | | Evridiki | Evridiki | | | | | George K. | | George K. | Eleftheria | | Spyros | Ria | Eleftheria | Ria | Ria | | Spyros | | Nikolas | Nikolas | Spyros | | | | Spyros | | Spyros | Ria | | | Spyros | Ilias B. | | | | Stella | Stella | | Ilias B. | Stella | Marios | Stella | Stavroula | Stavroula | Stavroula | Stavroula | Sakis | Stella | Stella |
| Marialena | Pericles | | Vrisiida | Takis | | | | Stella | Takis | | Kostas | Chris | Ria | Ria | | Chris | Sozon | | Chris | Melina | | | Melina | | | Melina | | | | | Jo | Jo | Jo | Nikolas | | Nikolas | | | | | | | | | Panagiotis | | | | | | George K. | Melina | George K. | | George K. | | | George K. | Takis | | | Konstantinos | Takis | Konstantinos | | | Melina | | | Ilias B. | Ilias B. | Stavroula | Nikos | Stavroula | Nikos | Sakis | Nikos | Stella |
| Marios | | Stavroula | | | | Costas | Evridiki | | | Spyros | | | | | | | | Costas | | | Spyros | Costas | | Spyros | Christina | | Evridiki | | Eleftheria | Spyros | | | | | Nikoleta | | Eleftheria | Eleftheria | | Spyros | Eleni | Eleftheria | Spyros | Nikolas | | Spyros | | Nikos | Nikolas | Spyros | | | | Ria | | Spyros | Ria | | | Spyros | George | | | | George | Nikos | | Nikos | Ilias B. | Konstantinos | Konstantinos | Stavroula | Nikos | Stavroula | Nikos | Sakis | Nikos | Marialena |
| Stella | Pericles | | Kostas | George | | | | Carolina | George | | George | Chris | Kostas | Marialena | | Chris | Marialena | | Chris | Melina | | | Melina | | | Jo | | | | | George | George | Panagiotis | Melina | | Panagiotis | | Eleftheria | | Spyros | Eleni | Eleftheria | Nikos | Nikolas | | Spyros | | Nikos | George | Spyros | | | | Spyros | | Spyros | Nikos | | | Spyros | George | | | | George | Nikos | | Nikos | Ilias B. | Nikos | Konstantinos | Marialena | Nikos | Stavroula | Nikos | Sakis | Nikos | Marialena |
| Stavroula | | Costas | | | | Costas | Spyros | | | Spyros | | | | | | | | Costas | | | Spyros | Costas | | Afroditi | Christina | | Eleftheria | | Eleftheria | Evridiki | | | | | Spyros | | Eleftheria | | | | | | | | | Spyros | | Nikos | Nikolas | Nikolas | | | | Nikos | | Ria | Ria | | | Nikos | Nikos | | | | George | Nikos | | Nikos | Marios | Nikos | Sakis | Marialena | Marialena | Marialena | Marialena | Stella | Eliminated | |
| Ilias B. | Pericles | | Vrisiida | Takis | | | | Stella | Takis | | Evi | Chris | Kostas | Ria | | Sozon | Sozon | | Chris | Melina | | | Melina | | | Panagiotis | | | | | Panagiotis | George | Panagiotis | Melina | | Panagiotis | | | | | | | | | | Spyros | | Nikos | George | Nikolas | | | | Nikolas | | Ria | Ria | | | George | George | | | | George | Nikos | | Nikos | Stella | Nikos | Sakis | Marialena | Marialena | Marialena | Eliminated | | | |
| Konstantinos | Pericles | | Vrisiida | George | | | | Carolina | George | | Carolina | Chris | George | Ria | | Chris | Sozon | | Chris | Melina | | | Melina | | | Jo | | | | | George | Jo | Jo | Melina | | Panagiotis | | | | | | | | | Panagiotis | | | | | | George K. | Stelios | Stelios | | George K. | | | George K. | Melina | | | Melina | Melina | Melina | | | Melina | | | Stella | Stella | Marios | Eliminated | | | | | |
| Melina | Pericles | | Vrisiida | George | | | | Carolina | George | | George | Chris | George | Marialena | | Chris | Marialena | | Chris | George | | | George | | | Jo | | | | | Panagiotis | Konstantinos | Konstantinos | Nikolas | | Takis | | Spyros | | Spyros | Stella | Eleftheria | Spyros | Ria | Takis | | | | | | Evi | Takis | Stelios | | George K. | | | Takis | Konstantinos | | | Konstantinos | Takis | Konstantinos | | | Konstantinos | | | Eliminated | | | | | | | | |
| George | Pericles | | Vrisiida | Takis | | | | Stella | Takis | | Kostas | Chris | Kostas | Ria | | Chris | Sozon | | Melina | Melina | | | Melina | | | Panagiotis | | | | | Panagiotis | Panagiotis | Konstantinos | Ria | | Panagiotis | | Eleftheria | | Nikolas | Stella | Eleftheria | Spyros | Ria | | Spyros | | Nikolas | Nikolas | Spyros | | | | Nikolas | | Spyros | Ria | | | Spyros | Ilias B. | | | | Stella | Stella | Eliminated | | | | | | | | | | | |
| Takis | Pericles | | Vrisiida | George | | | | Carolina | George | | George | Chris | Evi | Ria | | Chris | Sozon | | Melina | Melina | | | Melina | | | Panagiotis | | | | | George | Panagiotis | Panagiotis | Melina | | Panagiotis | | | | | | | | | Panagiotis | | | | | | George K. | Melina | Stelios | | George K. | | | George K. | Melina | | | Melina | Melina | Eliminated | | | | | | | | | | | | | | |
| Spyros | | Costas | | | | Evridiki | Evridiki | | | Eleni | | | | | | | | Costas | | | Costas | Costas | | George K. | Christina | | Eleni | | Eleftheria | Evridiki | | | | | Eleftheria | | Eleftheria | Eleftheria | | Nikolas | Stella | Eleftheria | Stella | Stella | | Stella | | Nikos | George | Nikolas | | | | Nikolas | | Ria | Ria | | | George | Nikos | Eliminated | | | | | | | | | | | | | | | | |
| George K. | Not in the Game | | | | | | | | | Spyros | | | | | | | | Costas | | | Spyros | Afroditi | | Afroditi | Christina | | Evridiki | | Evridiki | Evridiki | | | | | Eleftheria | | Spyros | | | | | | | | Panagiotis | | | | | | Takis | Takis | Takis | | Takis | | | Takis | Takis | Eliminated | | | | | | | | | | | | | | | | | | |
| Ria | Not in the Game | | | | | | | | Takis | | Carolina | Kostas | Kostas | Marialena | | George | Marialena | | Chris | Melina | | | Melina | | | Panagiotis | | | | | George | George | Panagiotis | Melina | | Takis | | Eleftheria | | Spyros | Eleni | Eleftheria | Nikos | Nikolas | | Spyros | | Nikos | George | Spyros | | | | George | | Spyros | George | Eliminated | | | | | | | | | | | | | | | | | | | | |
| Nikolas | Not in the Game | | | | | | | | | | | | | | | | | | | | | | Melina | | | Panagiotis | | | | | George | George | Jo | Melina | | Takis | | Eleftheria | | Spyros | Eleni | Eleftheria | Nikos | George | | Spyros | | Nikos | George | Spyros | | | | Spyros | | | Eliminated | | | | | | | | | | | | | | | | | | | | | |
| Stelios | | Asimina | | | | Evridiki | Evridiki | | | Costas | | | | | | | | Costas | | | Spyros | Afroditi | | Afroditi | Christina | | Evridiki | | Eleftheria | Evridiki | | | | | Nikoleta | | Eleftheria | | | | | | | | Takis | | | | | | Evi | Melina | Konstantinos | | Walked | | | | | | | | | | | | | | | | | | | | | | | |
| Evi | Pericles | | Vrisiida | Takis | | | | Carolina | Takis | | Carolina | Chris | Takis | Ria | | Sozon | Sozon | | Chris | Melina | | | Melina | | | Jo | | | | | George | George | Panagiotis | Ilias B. | | Takis | | | | | | | | | Takis | | | | | | Stelios | Takis | Eliminated | | | | | | | | | | | | | | | | | | | | | | | | | |
| Panagiotis | Not in the Game | | | | | | | | | | | | | | | | | | | | | | Melina | | | Jo | | | | | Jo | Konstantinos | Konstantinos | Evi | | Takis | | | | | | | | | Takis | | | | | Eliminated | | | | | | | | | | | | | | | | | | | | | | | | | | | | |
| Afroditi | | Costas | | | | Stavroula | Stavroula | | | Eleni | | | | | | | | Costas | | | Costas | Costas | | George K. | Evridiki | | Evridiki | | Evridiki | Evridiki | | | | | Eleftheria | | George K. | | | | | | | | Takis | | Expelled | | | | | | | | | | | | | | | | | | | | | | | | | | | | | | | |
| Eleftheria | Not in the Game | | | | | | | | | | | | | | | | | | | | | Costas | | George K. | Christina | | Eleni | | Nikos | Spyros | | | | | Nikoleta | | George K. | Spyros | | Spyros | Eleni | Spyros | Stella | Ria | Eliminated | | | | | | | | | | | | | | | | | | | | | | | | | | | | | | | | | |
| Eleni | | Costas | | | | Costas | Spyros | | | Spyros | | | | | | | | Costas | | | Spyros | Spyros | | Spyros | Christina | | Eleftheria | | Eleftheria | Evridiki | | | | | Spyros | | Spyros | Eleftheria | | Spyros | Ria | Eliminated | | | | | | | | | | | | | | | | | | | | | | | | | | | | | | | | | | | | |
| Giorikas | Not in the Game | | | | | | | | | | | | | | | | | | | | | | | | | Evi | | | | | George | George | Jo | Stella | | George | | Eleftheria | Expelled | | | | | | | | | | | | | | | | | | | | | | | | | | | | | | | | | | | | | | | |
| Ilias G. | Pericles | | Vrisiida | George | | | | Carolina | George | | Carolina | Chris | Marialena | Marialena | | Sozon | Sozon | | Chris | Melina | | | Melina | | | Panagiotis | | | | | George | George | Panagiotis | Takis | | Takis | | Eleftheria | Expelled | | | | | | | | | | | | | | | | | | | | | | | | | | | | | | | | | | | | | | | |
| Nikoleta | Not in the Game | | | | | | | | | | | | | | | | | | | | | | | | Christina | | Eleftheria | | Eleftheria | Evridiki | | | | | Spyros | | Spyros | Eliminated | | | | | | | | | | | | | | | | | | | | | | | | | | | | | | | | | | | | | | | | |
| Jo | Not in the Game | | | | | | | | | | | | | | | | | | | | | | Melina | | | Ilias B. | | | | | George | Konstantinos | Konstantinos | Nikolas | Eliminated | | | | | | | | | | | | | | | | | | | | | | | | | | | | | | | | | | | | | | | | | | | |
| Evridiki | Not in the Game | | | | | | | | | | | | | | | | | | | | | Marios | | Eleni | Eleni | | Eleni | | Nikos | Nikos | Eliminated | | | | | | | | | | | | | | | | | | | | | | | | | | | | | | | | | | | | | | | | | | | | | | | |
| Stathis | | Asimina | | | | Evridiki | Evridiki | | | Eleni | | | | | | | | Costas | | | Stelios | Costas | | George K. | Evridiki | | Evridiki | Walked | | | | | | | | | | | | | | | | | | | | | | | | | | | | | | | | | | | | | | | | | | | | | | | | | | |
| Christina | Not in the Game | | | | | | | | | | | | | | | | | | | | | George K. | | George K. | Evridiki | | Eleni | Eliminated | | | | | | | | | | | | | | | | | | | | | | | | | | | | | | | | | | | | | | | | | | | | | | | | | | |
| Costas | | Stavroula | | | | Stavroula | Evridiki | | | Eleni | | | | | | | | Spyros | | | Spyros | Spyros | | Eleni | Eliminated | | | | | | | | | | | | | | | | | | | | | | | | | | | | | | | | | | | | | | | | | | | | | | | | | | | | | |
| Chris | Not in the Game | | | | | | | | Takis | | Carolina | Ilias G. | Evi | Marialena | | George | Marialena | | Melina | Melina | | Eliminated | | | | | | | | | | | | | | | | | | | | | | | | | | | | | | | | | | | | | | | | | | | | | | | | | | | | | | | | |
| Sozon | Not in the Game | | | | | | | | | | | Evi | Evi | Marialena | | George | George | | Eliminated | | | | | | | | | | | | | | | | | | | | | | | | | | | | | | | | | | | | | | | | | | | | | | | | | | | | | | | | | | | |
| Kostas | Pericles | | Vrisiida | George | | | | Carolina | George | | George | Chris | Ria | Ria | | Eliminated | | | | | | | | | | | | | | | | | | | | | | | | | | | | | | | | | | | | | | | | | | | | | | | | | | | | | | | | | | | | | | |
| Asimina | | Costas | | | | Stavroula | Evridiki | | | Nikos | | | | Expelled | | | | | | | | | | | | | | | | | | | | | | | | | | | | | | | | | | | | | | | | | | | | | | | | | | | | | | | | | | | | | | | | |
| Katerina | | Costas | | | | Stelios | Evridiki | | | Spyros | | | | Expelled | | | | | | | | | | | | | | | | | | | | | | | | | | | | | | | | | | | | | | | | | | | | | | | | | | | | | | | | | | | | | | | | |
| Carolina | Pericles | | Vrisiida | Takis | | | | Stella | Takis | | Kostas | Eliminated | | | | | | | | | | | | | | | | | | | | | | | | | | | | | | | | | | | | | | | | | | | | | | | | | | | | | | | | | | | | | | | | | | |
| Evridiki | | Costas | | | | Costas | Spyros | | Eliminated | | | | | | | | | | | | | | | | | | | | | | | | | | | | | | | | | | | | | | | | | | | | | | | | | | | | | | | | | | | | | | | | | | | | | |
| Pericles | Melina | | George | George | | Eliminated | | | | | | | | | | | | | | | | | | | | | | | | | | | | | | | | | | | | | | | | | | | | | | | | | | | | | | | | | | | | | | | | | | | | | | | | |
| Vrisiida | Pericles | | Kostas | Walked | | | | | | | | | | | | | | | | | | | | | | | | | | | | | | | | | | | | | | | | | | | | | | | | | | | | | | | | | | | | | | | | | | | | | | | | | | |

- Vrisiida was nominated, but she decided to leave due to health issues.
- Stelios was nominated, but he decided to leave voluntarily.

== Matches ==
=== Team matches ===
| Episode | | | Winner | Score | Reward |
| Week | No. | Air date | Winner | Score | Reward |
|---|---|---|---|---|---|
| 1 | 1 | January 8, 2023 | Diasimoi | 10-8 | Immunity, fire & lentil |
| 1 | 2 | January 9, 2023 | Machites | 10-9 | Immunity |
| 1 | 3 | January 10, 2023 | Diasimoi | 10-7 | Immunity |
| 1 | 4 | January 11, 2023 | Diasimoi | 10-7 | Rice |
| 2 | 5 | January 15, 2023 | Machites | 10-9 | Immunity & Dessert |
| 2 | 6 | January 16, 2023 | Machites | 10-9 | Immunity |
| 2 | 7 | January 17, 2023 | Diasimoi | 7-2 | Quiz (Toast) |
| 2 | 7 | January 17, 2023 | Diasimoi | 10-4 | Immunity |
| 2 | 8 | January 18, 2023 | Diasimoi | 10-7 | Omelette & fizzy drinks |
| 3 | 9 | January 22, 2023 | Diasimoi | 10-4 | Immunity & Peanut butter |
| 3 | 10 | January 23, 2023 | Diasimoi | 10-5 | Mini game (crepes) |
| 3 | 10 | January 23, 2023 | Machites | 10-8 | Immunity |
| 3 | 11 | January 24, 2023 | Diasimoi | 10-8 | Immunity & Local fruits |
| 3 | 12 | January 25, 2023 | Machites | 10-6 | Pies |
| 4 | 13 | January 29, 2023 | Diasimoi | 10-2 | Immunity, coca cola & club sandwich |
| 4 | 14 | January 30, 2023 | Machites | 3-1 | Mini Game (Cake) |
| 4 | 14 | January 30, 2023 | Diasimoi | 10-2 | Immunity |
| 4 | 15 | January 31, 2023 | Diasimoi | 10-7 | Immunity & Fishing kit |
| 4 | 16 | February 1, 2023 | Diasimoi | 10-2 | Communication Reward & Bread with tahini |
| 4 | 16 | February 1, 2023 | Machites | 7-3 | Quiz (pancakes) |
| 4 | 17 | February 2, 2023 | - | 8-6* | Pizza |
| 5 | 18 | February 5, 2023 | Diasimoi | 10-9 | Immunity & Mousakas |
| 5 | 19 | February 6, 2023 | Diasimoi | 10-7 | Immunity |
| 5 | 20 | February 7, 2023 | Machites | 10-9 | Immunity & Kagianas |
| 5 | 21 | February 8, 2023 | Diasimoi | 10-8 | Communication Reward & Pancakes |
| 5 | 22 | February 9, 2023 | Diasimoi | 7-4 | Mini Game (Biscuits) |
| 5 | 22 | February 9, 2023 | Diasimoi | 10-7 | Pizza |
| 6 | 23 | February 12, 2023 | Diasimoi | 10-3 | Immunity & Pinnacles with wizzy drinks |
| 6 | 24 | February 13, 2023 | Diasimoi | 10-9 | Immunity |
| 6 | 25 | February 14, 2023 | Machites | 10-6 | Immunity |
| 6 | 26 | February 15, 2023 | Diasimoi | 10-3 | Communication Reward & Legumes |
| 6 | 27 | February 16, 2023 | Machites | 10-8 | Mini rollitos |
| 7 | 28 | February 19, 2023 | Machites | 10-4 | Immunity & meat |
| 7 | 29 | February 20, 2023 | Diasimoi | 10-8 | Immunity |
| 7 | 30 | February 21, 2023 | Machites | 10-2 | Immunity |
| 7 | 31 | February 22, 2023 | Diasimoi | 10-7 | Communication Reward & Croissants |
| 7 | 32 | February 23, 2023 | Diasimoi | 10-6 | Halva |
| 8 | 33 | February 26, 2023 | Machites | 10-8 | Immunity & Clean Monday Meal |
| 8 | 34 | February 27, 2023 | Diasimoi | 10-8 | Immunity |
| 8 | 35 | February 28, 2023 | Machites | 7-5 | Mini Game (Pudding) |
| 8 | 35 | February 28, 2023 | Machites | 10-6 | Immunity |
| 8 | 36 | March 3, 2023 | Machites | 10-6 | Communication Reward |
| 8 | 36 | March 3, 2023 | Machites | 7-5 | Quiz (Toast) |
| 8 | 37 | March 4, 2023 | Machites | 10-8 | Hot Dogs |
| 9 | 38 | March 5, 2023 | Machites | 10-8 | Immunity & Tortilles |
| 9 | 39 | March 6, 2023 | Machites | 10-4 | Immunity |
| 9 | 40 | March 7, 2023 | Diasimoi | 10-4 | Immunity |
| 9 | 41 | March 8, 2023 | Machites | 10-7 | Communication Reward & Pasta |
| 9 | 42 | March 9, 2023 | Machites | 10-9 | Healthy Chips |
| 10 | 43 | March 12, 2023 | Diasimoi | 10-9 | Immunity & Soutzoukakia with puree |
| 10 | 44 | March 13, 2023 | Diasimoi | 10-8 | Immunity |
| 10 | 45 | March 14, 2023 | Diasimoi | 10-9 | Immunity |
| 10 | 46 | March 15, 2023 | Machites | 10-8 | Communication Reward |
| 10 | 47 | March 16, 2023 | Machites | 10-4 | Pizza & fruits |
| 11 | 48 | March 19, 2023 | Machites | 10-9 | Immunity |
| 11 | 49 | March 20, 2023 | Diasimoi | 10-7 | Immunity |
| 11 | 50 | March 21, 2023 | Machites | 10-6 | Immunity |
| 11 | 51 | March 22, 2023 | Diasimoi | 10-7 | Communication Reward |
| 11 | 52 | March 23, 2023 | Diasimoi | 10-8 | 25 March Traditional Menu |
| 12 | 53 | March 26, 2023 | Red | 10-6 | Immunity & Chicken |
| 12 | 54 | March 27, 2023 | Red | 10-7 | Immunity |
| 12 | 55 | March 28, 2023 | Red | 10-8 | Immunity |
| 12 | 56 | March 29, 2023 | Blue | 7-6 | Communication Reward |
| 12 | 57 | March 30, 2023 | Blue | 10-7 | Pies |
| 13 | 58 | April 2, 2023 | Red | 2-0 | Immunity & Cereal with milk |
| 13 | 59 | April 3, 2023 | Red | 2-0 | Immunity |
| 13 | 60 | April 4, 2023 | Red | 2-0 | Immunity |
| 13 | 61 | April 5, 2023 | Red | 2-1 | Communication Reward |
| 13 | 62 | April 6, 2023 | Red | 2-0 | Tsoureki with tahini |
| 14 | 63 | April 9, 2023 | Blue | 10-8 | Immunity & Kebab |
| 14 | 64 | April 10, 2023 | Red | 10-9 | Immunity |
| 14 | 65 | April 11, 2023 | Red | 10-9 | Fish |
| 14 | 65 | April 11, 2023 | Blue | 10-6 | Quiz (Cheesecake) |
| 15 | 66 | April 17, 2023 | Red | 10-8 | Immunity & Easter Meal |
| 15 | 67 | April 18, 2023 | Red | 10-4 | Immunity |
| 15 | 67 | April 18, 2023 | Blue | 5-3 | Hot dogs |
| 15 | 68 | April 19, 2023 | Blue | 2-1 | Dinner with the Turkish team |
| 15 | 69 | April 20, 2023 | Red | 10-8 | Pasta |
| 16 | 70 | April 23, 2023 | Ria | - | Merge Party: Singing contest |
| 16 | 71 | April 24, 2023 | Red | 10-3 | Immunity |
| 16 | 72 | April 25, 2023 | Blue | 10-6 | Immunity & cheese pies |
| 16 | 73 | April 26, 2023 | Blue | 10-1 | Immunity & pizza & burger |
| 16 | 73 | April 26, 2023 | Red | 7-5 | Cake |
| 16 | 74 | April 27, 2023 | Blue | 10-6 | Meat, hot dogs & sausages |
| 17 | 75 | April 30, 2023 | Blue | 5-2 | Quiz (cheese cake) |
| 17 | 75 | April 30, 2023 | Blue | 2-1 | Trip to London |
| 17 | 76 | May 1, 2023 | Blue | 2-0 | Immunity |
| 17 | 77 | May 2, 2023 | Red | 2-1 | Immunity |
| 17 | 78 | May 3, 2023 | Blue | 2-0 | Immunity |
| 17 | 79 | May 4, 2023 | Red | 2-0 | Communication Reward |
| 18 | 80 | May 7, 2023 | Red | 2-0 | Immunity |
| 18 | 81 | May 8, 2023 | Red | 2-0 | Immunity |
| 18 | 82 | May 9, 2023 | Red | 2-0 | Trip to Miami |
| 19 | 83 | May 14, 2023 | Sakis | - | Car and Trip to Punta Cana |
| 19 | 84 | May 15, 2023 | Blue | 2-1 | Immunity |
| 19 | 85 | May 16, 2023 | Blue | 2-0 | Immunity |
| 19 | 86 | May 17, 2023 | Red | 2-0 | Ice cream & Zip Line |
| 20 | 87 | May 23, 2023 | Red | 2-1 | Immunity |
| 20 | 88 | May 24, 2023 | Red | 2-0 | Immunity |
| 20 | 89 | May 25, 2023 | Red | 2-1 | Trip to New York |
| 21 | 90 | May 28, 2023 | Stavroula | - | Car |
| 21 | 91 | May 29, 2023 | Blue | 2-0 | Immunity |
| 21 | 92 | May 30, 2023 | Blue | 2-1 | Immunity |
| 21 | 92 | May 30, 2023 | Men | 2-0 | Greek and Turkish men vs women |
| 21 | 93 | May 31, 2023 | Red | 2-0 | Communication Reward |
| 21 | 94 | June 1, 2023 | Red | 2-1 | Communication Reward |
| 22 | 95 | June 5, 2023 | Blue | 7-5 | Quiz (cannoli) |
| 22 | 95 | June 5, 2023 | Blue | 2-0 | Immunity |
| 22 | 96 | June 6, 2023 | Red | 2-0 | Immunity |
| 22 | 97 | June 7, 2023 | Red | 2-0 | Immunity & Pizza |
| 22 | 98 | June 8, 2023 | Red | 2-1 | Trip to Punta Cana |
| 23 | 99 | June 11, 2023 | Blue | 2-0 | Immunity & Souvlaki |
| 23 | 100 | June 12, 2023 | Red | 2-1 | Immunity |
| 23 | 101 | June 13, 2023 | Red | 2-1 | Immunity |
| 23 | 102 | June 14, 2023 | Blue | 2-1 | Trip to Punta Cana |
| 23 | 102 | June 14, 2023 | Red | 3-1 | Mini Game (Donuts) |
| 24 | 103 | June 18, 2023 | Stavroula | - | Captains Game |
| 24 | 103 | June 18, 2023 | Red | 2-0 | Water sports |
| 24 | 104 | June 19, 2023 | Red | 5-4 | Mini game (cupcakes) |
| 24 | 104 | June 19, 2023 | Sakis | - | Individual immunity |
| 24 | 105 | June 20, 2023 | Marialena | - | Individual immunity & Burgers with french fries |
| 24 | 106 | June 21, 2023 | Stella | - | Individual immunity & Meal |
| 25 | 107 | June 26, 2023 | Sakis | - | Individual immunity |
| 25 | 108 | June 27, 2023 | Sakis | - | Individual immunity |
| 25 | 109 | June 28, 2023 | Sakis | - | Individual immunity & Ice cream |
| 25 | 110 | June 29, 2023 | Marios | - | Individual immunity & Breakfast |
| 26 | 111 | July 2, 2023 | Sakis | - | Shower, Chocolate Massage and Italian Meal |
| 26 | 112 | July 3, 2023 | Red | 4-3 | Mini games (Chocolate Cake) |
| 26 | 113 | July 4, 2023 | Sakis | - | Individual immunity |
| 26 | 114 | July 5, 2023 | Sakis | - | Individual immunity |
| 26 | 115 | July 6, 2023 | Sakis | - | Qualified to Semi-final & Hot-dog and french fries |
| 27 | 116 | July 9, 2023 | Marialena | - | Qualified to Semi-final |

*Machites were ahead 8-6, but they quit and the game was cancelled.

== Finals ==
| Episode | Winner | Notes |
|---|---|---|
| 116 | Sakis; Marialena | Sakis and Marialena won the immunity and qualify to the semifinal. |
| 117 | Nikos; ~~Marios~~ | Nikos and Marios who didn't win the immunity, went through the public vote to qualify to the Semi-final. Nikos qualified and Marios was eliminated. |
| 117 | Nikos; Sakis; ~~Marialena~~ | At the Semifinal the last three contestants went through public vote and the two would qualify to the grand final. Sakis and Nikos qualified and Marialena was eliminated. |
| 118 | Sakis Katsoulis | At the Final, Sakis Katsoulis was named Sole Survivor All Star 2023. Season finale |

== Ratings ==
Official ratings are taken from AGB Hellas.

| Week | Episode | Air date | Timeslot (EET) | Ratings | Viewers (in millions) | Rank | | Share | | Source |
| Week | Episode | Air date | Timeslot (EET) | Ratings | Viewers (in millions) | Daily | Weekly | Household | Adults 18-54 | Source |
|---|---|---|---|---|---|---|---|---|---|---|
| 1 | 1 | January 8, 2023 | Sunday 9:00pm | 15.6% | 1.572 | #1 | #1 | 39.2% | 39.7% | |
| 1 | 2 | January 9, 2023 | Monday 9:00pm | 13.2% | 1.331 | #1 | #2 | 31.5% | 33.7% | |
| 1 | 3 | January 10, 2023 | Tuesday 9:00pm | 13.3% | 1.340 | #1 | #1 | 32.4% | 34.5% | |
| 1 | 4 | January 11, 2023 | Wednesday 9:00pm | 11.9% | 1.202 | #1 | #3 | 30.8% | 31.6% | |
| 2 | 5 | January 15, 2023 | Sunday 9:00pm | 11.2% | 1.133 | #2 | #5 | 27.8% | 28.6% | |
| 2 | 6 | January 16, 2023 | Monday 9:00pm | 7.7% | 0.776 | #4 | #19 | 18.4% | 19.9% | |
| 2 | 7 | January 17, 2023 | Tuesday 9:00pm | 7.8% | 0.792 | #3 | #17 | 19.1% | 19.3% | |
| 2 | 8 | January 18, 2023 | Wednesday 9:00pm | 8.5% | 0.856 | #3 | #14 | 21.4% | 23.9% | |
| 3 | 9 | January 22, 2023 | Sunday 9:00pm | 10.9% | 1.101 | #2 | #7 | 26.6% | 27.4% | |
| 3 | 10 | January 23, 2023 | Monday 9:00pm | 9.1% | 0.921 | #3 | #13 | 20.3% | 21.2% | |
| 3 | 11 | January 24, 2023 | Tuesday 9:00pm | 8.0% | 0.809 | #5 | - | 19.6% | 20.4% | |
| 3 | 12 | January 25, 2023 | Wednesday 9:00pm | 8.2% | 0.828 | #4 | - | 20.1% | 20.5% | |
| 4 | 13 | January 29, 2023 | Sunday 9:00pm | 9.7% | 0.974 | #2 | #12 | 24.3% | 25.1% | |
| 4 | 14 | January 30, 2023 | Monday 9:00pm | 8.2% | 0.823 | #4 | - | 19.9% | 19.9% | |
| 4 | 15 | January 31, 2023 | Tuesday 9:00pm | 9.3% | 0.940 | #3 | #13 | 23.6% | 26.3% | |
| 4 | 16 | February 1, 2023 | Wednesday 9:00pm | 8.0% | 0.810 | #4 | - | 20.3% | 21.5% | |
| 4 | 17 | February 2, 2023 | Thursday 9:00pm | 9.1% | 0.916 | #3 | #17 | 21.4% | 22.1% | |
| 5 | 18 | February 5, 2023 | Sunday 9:00pm | 10.6% | 1.073 | #2 | #12 | 25.6% | 26.3% | |
| 5 | 19 | February 6, 2023 | Monday 9:00pm | 8.2% | 0.829 | #4 | - | 19.8% | 19.8% | |
| 5 | 20 | February 7, 2023 | Tuesday 9:00pm | 8.4% | 0.846 | #4 | #20 | 20.5% | 20.4% | |
| 5 | 21 | February 8, 2023 | Wednesday 9:00pm | 7.5% | 0.759 | #5 | - | 18.4% | 19.6% | |
| 5 | 22 | February 9, 2023 | Thursday 9:00pm | 8.1% | 0.815 | #5 | - | 20.2% | 21.1% | |
| 6 | 23 | February 12, 2023 | Sunday 9:00pm | 8.9% | 0.899 | #3 | #17 | 22.4% | 22.4% | |
| 6 | 24 | February 13, 2023 | Monday 9:00pm | 7.6% | 0.770 | #5 | - | 19.0% | 20.0% | |
| 6 | 25 | February 14, 2023 | Tuesday 9:00pm | 7.4% | 0.747 | #5 | - | 18.9% | 19.5% | |
| 6 | 26 | February 15, 2023 | Wednesday 9:00pm | 8.6% | 0.872 | #3 | #18 | 21.6% | 21.3% | |
| 6 | 27 | February 16, 2023 | Thursday 9:00pm | 7.4% | 0.742 | #4 | - | 20.0% | 20.1% | |
| 7 | 28 | February 19, 2023 | Sunday 9:00pm | 10.6% | 1.073 | #2 | #11 | 27.2% | 28.6% | |
| 7 | 29 | February 20, 2023 | Monday 9:00pm | 7.5% | 0.755 | #5 | - | 19.0% | 19.0% | |
| 7 | 30 | February 21, 2023 | Tuesday 9:00pm | 8.0% | 0.809 | #4 | #18 | 20.2% | 21.2% | |
| 7 | 31 | February 22, 2023 | Wednesday 9:00pm | 8.9% | 0.899 | #3 | #15 | 23.0% | 21.5% | |
| 7 | 32 | February 23, 2023 | Thursday 9:00pm | 7.9% | 0.794 | #5 | #20 | 20.1% | 20.2% | |
| 8 | 33 | February 26, 2023 | Sunday 9:00pm | 9.2% | 0.932 | #2 | #14 | 25.6% | 23.7% | |
| 8 | 34 | February 27, 2023 | Monday 9:00pm | 8.3% | 0.841 | #3 | #15 | 21.0% | 23.1% | |
| 8 | 35 | February 28, 2023 | Tuesday 9:00pm | 7.8% | 0.785 | #4 | #16 | 18.6% | 19.5% | |
| 8 | 36 | March 3, 2023 | Friday 9:00pm | 9.0% | 0.911 | #2 | #14 | 21.2% | 21.2% | |
| 8 | 37 | March 4, 2023 | Saturday 9:00pm | 10.3% | 1.037 | #2 | #10 | 25.8% | 25.7% | |
| 9 | 38 | March 5, 2023 | Sunday 9:00pm | 10.5% | 1.059 | #2 | #9 | 25.3% | 27.2% | |
| 9 | 39 | March 6, 2023 | Monday 9:00pm | 9.0% | 0.903 | #3 | #14 | 21.2% | 20.2% | |
| 9 | 40 | March 7, 2023 | Tuesday 9:00pm | 7.8% | 0.788 | #5 | - | 19.1% | 18.3% | |
| 9 | 41 | March 8, 2023 | Wednesday 9:00pm | 8.5% | 0.862 | #3 | #17 | 22.0% | 19.7% | |
| 9 | 42 | March 9, 2023 | Thursday 9:00pm | 8.1% | 0.820 | #4 | - | 21.7% | 19.2% | |
| 10 | 43 | March 12, 2023 | Sunday 9:00pm | 8.3% | 0.833 | #3 | #18 | 20.4% | 19.9% | |
| 10 | 44 | March 13, 2023 | Monday 9:00pm | 8.0% | 0.802 | #4 | - | 19.8% | 18.7% | |
| 10 | 45 | March 14, 2023 | Tuesday 9:00pm | 7.9% | 0.798 | #5 | - | 19.5% | 19.3% | |
| 10 | 46 | March 15, 2023 | Wednesday 9:00pm | 9.2% | 0.931 | #2 | #14 | 23.0% | 19.7% | |
| 10 | 47 | March 16, 2023 | Thursday 9:00pm | 8.2% | 0.826 | #4 | #18 | 20.0% | 16.9% | |
| 11 | 48 | March 19, 2023 | Sunday 9:00pm | 9.4% | 0.951 | #2 | #12 | 24.0% | 23.5% | |
| 11 | 49 | March 20, 2023 | Monday 9:00pm | 7.8% | 0.791 | #4 | - | 20.0% | 18.4% | |
| 11 | 50 | March 21, 2023 | Tuesday 9:00pm | 7.8% | 0.784 | #4 | - | 19.1% | 17.9% | |
| 11 | 51 | March 22, 2023 | Wednesday 9:00pm | 8.7% | 0.879 | #4 | #17 | 23.9% | 21.6% | |
| 11 | 52 | March 23, 2023 | Thursday 9:00pm | 8.8% | 0.889 | #3 | #16 | 22.1% | 19.6% | |
| 12 | 53 | March 26, 2023 | Sunday 9:00pm | 10.1% | 1.019 | #2 | #11 | 25.3% | 24.6% | |
| 12 | 54 | March 27, 2023 | Monday 9:00pm | 8.2% | 0.828 | #3 | #16 | 19.6% | 18.7% | |
| 12 | 55 | March 28, 2023 | Tuesday 9:00pm | 7.6% | 0.764 | #4 | - | 18.9% | 15.3% | |
| 12 | 56 | March 29, 2023 | Wednesday 9:00pm | 9.1% | 0.916 | #3 | #12 | 23.3% | 21.6% | |
| 12 | 57 | March 30, 2023 | Thursday 9:00pm | 8.3% | 0.834 | #3 | #14 | 20.1% | 18.3% | |
| 13 | 58 | April 2, 2023 | Sunday 9:00pm | 8.1% | 0.817 | #2 | #19 | 19.8% | 17.9% | |
| 13 | 59 | April 3, 2023 | Monday 9:00pm | 7.4% | 0.747 | #5 | - | 17.9% | 14.5% | |
| 13 | 60 | April 4, 2023 | Tuesday 9:00pm | 7.6% | 0.763 | #4 | - | 19.1% | 16.7% | |
| 13 | 61 | April 5, 2023 | Wednesday 9:00pm | 7.5% | 0.754 | #4 | - | 20.2% | 18.8% | |
| 13 | 62 | April 6, 2023 | Thursday 9:00pm | 7.7% | 0.773 | #4 | #19 | 19.4% | 16.9% | |
| 14 | 63 | April 9, 2023 | Sunday 9:00pm | 8.7% | 0.880 | #2 | #16 | 21.9% | 22.3% | |
| 14 | 64 | April 10, 2023 | Monday 9:00pm | 8.4% | 0.851 | #3 | #6 | 21.7% | 17.8% | |
| 14 | 65 | April 11, 2023 | Tuesday 9:00pm | 8.2% | 0.832 | #3 | #7 | 21.3% | 17.6% | |
| 15 | 66 | April 17, 2023 | Monday 9:00pm | 7.9% | 0.796 | #1 | #13 | 23.0% | 16.7% | |
| 15 | 67 | April 18, 2023 | Tuesday 9:00pm | 8.0% | 0.811 | #2 | #11 | 21.6% | 19.5% | |
| 15 | 68 | April 19, 2023 | Wednesday 9:00pm | 7.5% | 0.751 | #4 | #17 | 19.8% | 15.1% | |
| 15 | 69 | April 20, 2023 | Thursday 9:00pm | 7.2% | 0.729 | #4 | #18 | 19.8% | 15.9% | |
| 16 | 70 | April 23, 2023 | Sunday 9:00pm | 7.7% | 0.778 | #2 | #16 | 22.6% | 21.3% | |
| 16 | 71 | April 24, 2023 | Monday 9:00pm | 6.9% | 0.693 | #5 | - | 17.5% | 15.1% | |
| 16 | 72 | April 25, 2023 | Tuesday 9:00pm | 7.2% | 0.722 | #5 | - | 18.7% | 16.8% | |
| 16 | 73 | April 26, 2023 | Wednesday 9:00pm | 7.7% | 0.781 | #5 | #18 | 20.5% | 18.1% | |
| 16 | 74 | April 27, 2023 | Thursday 9:00pm | 6.8% | 0.686 | #5 | - | 18.1% | 16.3% | |
| 17 | 75 | April 30, 2023 | Sunday 9:00pm | 8.0% | 0.810 | #1 | #13 | 24.6% | 18.8% | |
| 17 | 76 | May 1, 2023 | Monday 9:00pm | 6.3% | 0.639 | #6 | - | 16.5% | 13.4% | |
| 17 | 77 | May 2, 2023 | Tuesday 9:00pm | 6.9% | 0.700 | #4 | - | 18.4% | 15.8% | |
| 17 | 78 | May 3, 2023 | Wednesday 9:00pm | 7.6% | 0.771 | #4 | #15 | 20.3% | 18.8% | |
| 17 | 79 | May 4, 2023 | Thursday 9:00pm | 7.3% | 0.735 | #4 | #19 | 19.0% | 15.5% | |
| 18 | 80 | May 7, 2023 | Sunday 9:00pm | 7.5% | 0.760 | #2 | #17 | 20.2% | 16.2% | |
| 18 | 81 | May 8, 2023 | Monday 9:00pm | 5.8% | 0.581 | #5 | - | 15.7% | 13.0% | |
| 18 | 82 | May 9, 2023 | Tuesday 9:00pm | 5.6% | 0.565 | #7 | - | 14.3% | 10.7% | |
| 19 | 83 | May 14, 2023 | Sunday 10:10pm | 5.9% | 0.596 | #6 | - | 18.9% | 16.2% | |
| 19 | 84 | May 15, 2023 | Monday 9:00pm | 6.7% | 0.671 | #6 | - | 16.4% | 13.6% | |
| 19 | 85 | May 16, 2023 | Tuesday 9:00pm | 6.5% | 0.660 | #4 | - | 17.3% | 13.9% | |
| 19 | 86 | May 17, 2023 | Wednesday 9:00pm | 6.9% | 0.694 | #4 | #19 | 18.7% | 14.0% | |
| 20 | 87 | May 23, 2023 | Tuesday 9:00pm | 6.8% | 0.682 | #5 | - | 17.8% | 15.3% | |
| 20 | 88 | May 24, 2023 | Wednesday 9:00pm | 6.7% | 0.676 | #5 | - | 18.1% | 15.9% | |
| 20 | 89 | May 25, 2023 | Thursday 9:00pm | 6.3% | 0.637 | #5 | - | 17.7% | 14.8% | |
| 21 | 90 | May 28, 2023 | Sunday 9:00pm | 7.0% | 0.703 | #2 | #20 | 19.4% | 16.3% | |
| 21 | 91 | May 29, 2023 | Monday 9:00pm | 6.3% | 0.639 | #4 | - | 17.4% | 15.3% | |
| 21 | 92 | May 30, 2023 | Tuesday 9:00pm | 6.4% | 0.644 | #4 | - | 18.1% | 15.5% | |
| 21 | 93 | May 31, 2023 | Wednesday 9:00pm | 7.3% | 0.740 | #4 | #16 | 19.8% | 17.8% | |
| 21 | 94 | June 1, 2023 | Thursday 9:00pm | 7.8% | 0.789 | #3 | #13 | 22.4% | 20.4% | |
| 22 | 95 | June 5, 2023 | Monday 9:00pm | 6.3% | 0.633 | #5 | - | 17.1% | 14.0% | |
| 22 | 96 | June 6, 2023 | Tuesday 9:00pm | 6.1% | 0.613 | #5 | - | 17.3% | 14.4% | |
| 22 | 97 | June 7, 2023 | Wednesday 9:00pm | 5.9% | 0.593 | #5 | - | 16.8% | 14.0% | |
| 22 | 98 | June 8, 2023 | Thursday 9:00pm | 5.9% | 0.595 | #6 | - | 17.0% | 15.5% | |
| 23 | 99 | June 11, 2023 | Sunday 9:00pm | 6.5% | 0.654 | #3 | - | 18.9% | 15.8% | |
| 23 | 100 | June 12, 2023 | Monday 9:00pm | 6.1% | 0.614 | #5 | - | 16.8% | 14.3% | |
| 23 | 101 | June 13, 2023 | Tuesday 9:00pm | 6.0% | 0.601 | #5 | - | 16.9% | 13.4% | |
| 23 | 102 | June 14, 2023 | Wednesday 9:00pm | 5.6% | 0.564 | #5 | - | 16.8% | 13.7% | |
| 24 | 103 | June 18, 2023 | Sunday 9:00pm | 6.3% | 0.634 | #4 | - | 17.7% | 12.9% | |
| 24 | 104 | June 19, 2023 | Monday 9:00pm | 5.7% | 0.579 | #4 | - | 17.1% | 12.9% | |
| 24 | 105 | June 20, 2023 | Tuesday 9:00pm | 5.9% | 0.592 | #4 | #19 | 17.4% | 13.9% | |
| 24 | 106 | June 21, 2023 | Wednesday 9:00pm | 6.2% | 0.625 | #4 | #17 | 19.4% | 15.4% | |
| 25 | 107 | June 26, 2023 | Monday 9:00pm | 5.7% | 0.577 | #5 | #19 | 17.4% | 12.6% | |
| 25 | 108 | June 27, 2023 | Tuesday 9:00pm | 5.6% | 0.561 | #4 | #20 | 17.0% | 13.3% | |
| 25 | 109 | June 28, 2023 | Wednesday 9:00pm | 5.5% | 0.551 | #4 | - | 18.3% | 13.3% | |
| 25 | 110 | June 29, 2023 | Thursday 9:00pm | 5.3% | 0.538 | #4 | - | 17.7% | 12.5% | |
| 26 | 111 | July 2, 2023 | Sunday 9:00pm | 5.4% | 0.545 | #3 | - | 17.8% | 12.6% | |
| 26 | 112 | July 3, 2023 | Monday 9:00pm | 4.7% | 0.471 | #5 | - | 14.6% | 12.6% | |
| 26 | 113 | July 4, 2023 | Tuesday 9:00pm | 4.7% | 0.478 | #6 | - | 14.9% | 13.4% | |
| 26 | 114 | July 5, 2023 | Wednesday 9:00pm | 4.8% | 0.479 | #7 | - | 14.7% | 12.0% | |
| 26 | 115 | July 6, 2023 | Thursday 9:00pm | 4.2% | 0.419 | #5 | - | 13.1% | 10.8% | |
| 27 | 116 | July 9, 2023 | Sunday 9:00pm | 5.3% | 0.538 | #3 | #16 | 18.8% | 13.5% | |
| 27 | 117 | July 10, 2023 | Monday 9:00pm | 7.1% | 0.714 | #2 | #6 | 25.3% | 21.2% | SEMI-FINAL |
| 27 | 118 | July 11, 2023 | Tuesday 9:00pm | 7.4% | 0.749 | #2 | #5 | 25.7% | 20.1% | FINAL |
