= Survivor Greece season 9 =

Survivor Greece
- Season 9
- Presented by: Giorgos Lianos
- No. of days: 198
- No. of castaways: 39
- Winner: Stathis Schizas
- Runner-up: Aristidis "Aris" Soiledis
- Location: La Romana, Dominican Republic
- No. of episodes: 134

Release
- Original network: Skai TV
- Original release: December 26, 2021 – July 6, 2022

Additional information
- Filming dates: December 21, 2021 – July 6, 2022

Season chronology
- ← Previous; Season 8 Next → Season 10

The ninth season of Survivor Greece, the Greek version of the popular reality show Survivor, began airing on December 26, 2021, on Skai TV and also in Cyprus on Sigma TV. Giorgos Lianos returned as the host. Twelve players and twelve celebrities, who have been known in Greece through their work, are invited to survive on a deserted island, the exotic La Romana in Dominican Republic, having their luggage, the necessary clothes and basic food supply.

== Contestants ==
The names of the original tribes were Mαχητές (Machites, meaning warriors), and Διάσημοι (Diasimoi, meaning celebrities). On the first day, 24 contestants entered the game.

In the fifth week, three new contestants entered the game: Aris Soiledis for the Diasimoi team, and Andreas Matthaiakakis and Thomaïs Emmanouilidou for the Machites team. In the eighth week, five new contestants entered the game: Katia Tarabanko, Giorgos Talantsev, Takis Karagounias and Sakis Arseniou for the Diasimoi team and Aggelos Poulis for the Machites team.

On the tenth week the new contestant Stavroula Chrisaeidi for the Machites team entered the game. On the eleventh week, two new contestants entered the game: Jo Maridaki for Machites team and Stathis Schizas for Diasimoi team. In Episode 59 the two new tribes Red and Blue were created.

On the fourteenth week, there were four new contestants: Konstantinos Emmanouil and Stella Andreadou for Blue team and Nikos Antonopoulos and Nikos Giannis for Red team.

List of Survivor Greece season 9 contestants
Contestant	Original tribe	Switched tribe	New tribe1	New tribe2	Merged tribe	Personal Statistics	Finish
Elisavet Spanou; 40, Athens, Singer	Diasimoi					60%	1st Voted Out; Episode 4
Giannis Chatzigeorgiou; 31, Athens, Actor, Singer	Diasimoi					0%	Walked; Episode 8
Paraskevi Stamatopoulou; 26, Athens, Strongman coach	Machites					62%	2nd Voted Out; Episode 13
Krystallia Koutsimani; 27, Trikala, Stay-at-home mom	Machites					30%	Evacuated; Episode 15
Stamatis Kalafatas; 35, Rhodes, Umbrella salesman	Machites					48%	Walked; Episode 15
Thanasis Bellos; 54, Athens, Football coach	Machites					86%	Walked; Episode 15
Chrisovalantis "Valantis" Avgenikos; 46, Athens, Singer	Diasimoi					15%	3rd Voted Out; Episode 18
Thanasis Viskadourakis; 53, Athens, Actor	Diasimoi					28%	4th Voted Out; Episode 23
Giorikas Pilidis; 21, Athens, World wrestling champion	Diasimoi					76%	Evacuated; Episode 24
Aspa Predari; 23, Athens, Businesswoman	Machites					42%	5th Voted Out; Episode 28
Lambros Konstantaras; 42, Athens, Journalist	Diasimoi					36%	6th Voted Out; Episode 33
Athina Evmorfiadi; 32, Patras, World kick boxing champion	Diasimoi					43%	Walked; Episode 33
Aggelos Poulis; 38, Los Angeles, Hollywood stuntman, parkourist	Machites	Machites				0%	Evacuated; Episode 38
Pelagia "Bella" Kazolea; 31, Athens, HR manager	Machites	Machites				36%	7th Voted Out; Episode 38
Sakis Arseniou; 34, Thessaloniki, Singer	Diasimoi	Diasimoi				36%	8th Voted Out; Episode 43
Giannis Tsolakis; 31, Alexandroupoli, Firefighter, radio producer	Machites	Machites				49%	9th Voted Out; Episode 48
Savvas Kalfas; 25, Athens, Psychologist	Machites	Machites				40%	10th Voted Out; Episode 53
Katia Tarabanko; 25, Mariupol, Model, Actress	Diasimoi	Diasimoi				39%	11th Voted Out; Episode 58
Andreas Matthaiakakis; 28, Athens, Professional poker player	Machites	Machites	Red			43%	12th Voted Out; Episode 63
Myriella Kourenti; 34, Athens, Actress	Diasimoi	Diasimoi	Red			41%	13th Voted Out; Episode 68
Evridiki Papadopoulou; 36, Haidari, Jewelry designer	Diasimoi	Diasimoi	Blue			44%	14th Voted Out; Episode 73
Nikos Antonopoulos; 26, Pyrgos, Model			Red			33%	15th Voted Out; Episode 78
Georgia "Jo" Maridaki; 19, Sitia, Veterinary student	Machites	Machites	Red			57%	16th Voted Out; Episode 82
Sofianna Avramaki; 26, Thessaloniki, Physiotherapist	Machites	Machites	Blue			47%	17th Voted Out; Episode 90
Giorgos Katsaounis; 27, Farsala, Farmer	Machites	Machites	Red			43%	Expelled; Episode 92
Apostolos Rouvas; 44, Athens, Chef	Diasimoi	Diasimoi	Red			48%	18th Voted Out; Episode 95
Nafsika Panagiotakopoulou; 28, Peristeri, Actress, Model	Diasimoi	Diasimoi	Red			43%	Evacuated; Episode 96
Takis Karagounias; 48, Aigio, Mercenary	Diasimoi	Diasimoi	Blue	Red		51%	19th Voted Out; Episode 100
Konstantinos Emmanouil; 37, Athens, Make up artist			Blue	Blue		23%	20th Voted Out; Episode 104
Stella Andreadou; 30, Thessaloniki, Special physical education teacher			Blue	Red		55%	21st Voted Out; Episode 110
Vrisiida Andriotou; 25, Thessaloniki, Model	Diasimoi	Diasimoi	Blue	Blue		43%	22nd Voted Out; Episode 115
Giorgos Talantsev; 28, Athens, Hotel manager	Diasimoi	Machites	Blue	Red	Merged Tribe	50%	23rd Voted Out; Episode 120
Spyros Martikas; 45, Piraeus, Pharmacist	Machites	Machites	Blue	Red	Merged Tribe	33%	24th Voted Out; Episode 125
Nikos Giannis; 39, Athens, Choreographer			Red	Blue	Merged Tribe	56%	25th Voted Out; Episode 128
Stavroula Chrisaeidi; 25, Athens, Track and field champion	Machites	Machites	Red	Blue	Merged Tribe	58%	26th Voted Out; Episode 131
Thomaïs Emmanouilidou; 24, Kastoria, World rowing champion	Machites	Machites	Blue	Red	Merged Tribe	51%	Quarter-Final; Episode 133
Asimina Chatziandreou; 22, Athens, Football player	Machites	Machites	Red	Blue	Merged Tribe	52%	Semi-Final; Episode 133
Aristidis "Aris" Soiledis; 30, Thiva, Football player	Diasimoi	Diasimoi	Blue	Blue	Merged Tribe	76%	Runner-up; Episode 134
Stathis Schizas; 30, Athens, Businessman	Diasimoi	Diasimoi	Red	Red	Merged Tribe	52%	Sole Survivor; Episode 134

== Voting history ==
=== Nominations table ===
	Original tribes																														Switched tribes																																		
Week #	1			2 (Note: Elimination cancelled, because Giannis C. decided to leave the game, due to personal reasons. But Evridiki, Myriella and Valantis will stay against the public vote for the third week.)			3		4					5		6			7		8		9		10		11		12		13		14		15		16		17		19		20			21			22		23		24			25			26			27		28	
Episode #	1	2	3	6	7	8	10	11	15				16	20	21	24	25	26	30	31	35	36	40	41	45	46	50	51	55	56	60	61	65	66	70	71	75	76	80	81	87	88	92	93		96	98	99	101	102	107	108	112	113	114	117	118	119	122	123	124	126	127	129	130
Tribe	Diasimoi	Diasimoi	Machites	Diasimoi	Diasimoi	Diasimoi	Diasimoi	Machites	Machites	Machites	Machites	Diasimoi	Diasimoi	Diasimoi	Machites	Diasimoi	Machites	Machites	Diasimoi	Diasimoi	Machites	Machites	Diasimoi	Diasimoi	Diasimoi	Machites	Machites	Machites	Machites	Diasimoi	Red	Blue	Red	Red	Blue	Blue	Blue	Red	Red	Blue	Blue	Blue	Red	Red	Blue	Red	Red	Red	Red	Blue	Red	Red	Red	Blue	Red	Merge									
Immunity	none			Giannis C.		none	Athena	Spyros	none			Lambros		Myriella	Savvas	none	Spyros		Vrisiida		Savvas		Aris		Apostolos	Savvas	Thomais		Asimina	Nafsika	George	Aris	Nafsika		Sofianna		Sofianna	Stathis	Nafsika	Konstantinos	Stella		Nafsika	none	Takis	none	Stella		none	Aris	Giorgos T.		none			Aris		Thomais	Aris		Nikos G.	Aris	Nikos G.	Aris	
Nominated by Immune	none			Evridiki		none	Nafsika	Stamatis	none			Thanasis V.		Athena	Asimina	none	Aspa		Lambros		Spyros		Myriella		Myriella	Giannis T.	Stavroula		Jo	Katia	Myriella	Spyros	Jo		Evridiki		Stella	Nikos G.	Jo	Aris	Sofianna		Apostolos	none	Aris	none	Stathis		none	none	Stella		none												
Nominated by Group	Valantis	Elizabeth	Spyros	Valantis	Myriella	none	Lambros	Paraskevi	none			Valantis	Giorikas	Thanasis V.	Sofianna	none	George	Andreas	Athena; Evridiki	Myriella; Apostolos	Andreas	Pelagia	Sakis	Nafsika	Vrisiida	Spyros	Spyros	Savvas	Spyros	Vrisiida	Andreas	Takis	Myriella	Apostolos	Konstantinos	Vrisiida	Konstantinos	Nikos A.	George	Sofianna	Takis	Vrisiida	Asimina	none	Konstantinos	none	Spyros	Takis	Spyros	Konstantinos	Spyros	Thomais	Spyros	Vrisiida	Giorgos T.	Spyros	Asimina	Giorgos T. Stathis	Asimina	Thomais	Spyros; Stavroula	Nikos G. Thomais	Aris; Stavroula	Stavroula	Stathis
Votes	8-2-1-1	6-4-1-1	11-1	8-2-1	6-3-1-1	none	6-2-2	10-1	none			7-2-1	8-1-1	5-4	5-3-1-1	none	8-1-1	6-2-1-1	5-1; 5-3	5-1; 4-3-1										5-2-1-1		5-2		5-4-1										none		none			4-1	5-1	4-1	3-2	4-1	4-1	3-2	7-1	6-1-1	4-4	4-3	4-3	3-3-1	3-3	3-3	3-2	3-2
Against public vote	Elizabeth; Spyros; Valantis			Evridiki; Myriella; Valantis		none	Evridiki; Lambros; Myriella; Nafsika; Paraskevi; Stamatis; Valantis		none			Giorikas; Thanasis V. Valantis		Asimina; Athena; Sofianna; Thanasis V.		none	George; Andreas; Aspa		Athena; Evridiki; Myriella; Apostolos; Lambros		Andreas; Pelagia; Spyros		Sakis; Nafsika; Myriella		Vrisiida; Spyros; Myriella; Giannis T.		Spyros; Savvas; Stavroula		Spyros; Vrisiida; Jo; Katia		Andreas; Takis; Myriella; Spyros		Myriella; Apostolos; Jo		Konstantinos; Vrisiida; Evridiki		Konstantinos; Nikos A. Stella; Nikos G.		George; Sofianna; Jo; Aris		Takis; Vrisiida; Sofianna		Asimina; Konstantinos; Apostolos; Aris			Spyros; Takis; Stathis			Spyros; Konstantinos		Spyros; Thomais; Stella		Spyros; Vrisiida; Giorgos T.			Spyros; Asimina; Giorgos T. Stathis			Asimina; Thomais; Spyros; Stavroula			Nikos G. Thomais; Stavroula; Aris		Stavroula; Stathis	
Eliminated	Elizabeth; Fewest votes by public to save			Elimination; Cancelled		Giannis C. Walked	Paraskevi; Fewest votes by public to save		Krystallia; Evacuated	Stamatis; Walked	Thanasis; Walked	Valantis; Fewest votes by public to save		Thanasis V. Fewest votes by public to save		Giorikas; Evacuated	Aspa; Fewest votes by public to save		Lambros; Fewest votes by public to save		Pelagia; Fewest votes by public to save		Sakis; Fewest votes by public to save		Giannis T. Fewest votes by public to save		Savvas; Fewest votes by public to save		Katia; Fewest votes by public to save		Andreas; Fewest votes by public to save		Myriella; Fewest votes by public to save		Evridiki; Fewest votes by public to save		Nikos A. Fewest votes by public to save		Jo; Fewest votes by public to save		Sofianna; Fewest votes by public to save			George; Expelled	Apostolos; Fewest votes by public to save	Nafsika; Evacuated	Takis; Fewest votes by public to save		Konstantinos; Fewest votes by public to save		Stella; Fewest votes by public to save		Vrisiida; Fewest votes by public to save			Giorgos T. Fewest votes by public to save			Spyros; Fewest votes by public to save			Nikos G. Fewest votes by public to save		Stavroula; Fewest votes by public to save	
Voter	Vote																																																																
Apostolos	Valantis	Giannis C.		Valantis	Athena		Thanasis V.					Valantis	Giorikas	Thanasis V.																																																			
Aris	Not in the Game													Thanasis V.																																																			
Athena	Valantis	Giannis C.		Valantis	Myriella		Lambros					Valantis	Giorikas	Lambros																																																			
Evridiki	Giorikas	Giannis C.		Lambros	Myriella		Lambros					Myriella	Giorikas	Lambros																																																			
Giorgos T.	Not in the Game																																																																
Katia	Not in the Game																																																																
Lambros	Thanasis V.	Elizabeth		Valantis	Thanasis V.		Vrisiida					Valantis	Giorikas	Thanasis V.																																																			
Myriella	Valantis	Elizabeth		Valantis	Thanasis V.		Thanasis V.					Valantis	Giorikas	Thanasis V.																																																			
Nafsika	Valantis	Elizabeth		Valantis	Thanasis V.		Vrisiida					Valantis	Giorikas	Thanasis V.																																																			
Nikos A.	Not in the Game																																																																
Nikos G.	Not in the Game																																																																
Sakis	Not in the Game																																																																
Stathis	Not in the Game																																																																
Takis	Not in the Game																																																																
Vrisiida	Valantis	Elizabeth		Valantis	Myriella		Lambros					Valantis	Giorikas	Lambros																																																			
Aggelos	Not in the Game																																																																
Andreas	Not in the Game														Sofianna		George	Sofianna																																															
Asimina			Spyros					Paraskevi							Spyros		George	Andreas																																															
Aspa			Spyros					Paraskevi							Spyros		George	Andreas																																															
George			Spyros					Paraskevi							Aspa		Savvas	Aspa																																															
Giannis T.			Spyros					Paraskevi							Sofianna		Andreas	Andreas																																															
Jo	Not in the Game																																																																
Konstantinos	Not in the Game																																																																
Pelagia			Spyros					Paraskevi							George		George	Andreas																																															
Savvas			Spyros					Paraskevi							Sofianna		George	Giannis T.																																															
Sofianna			Spyros					Paraskevi							Spyros		George	Andreas																																															
Spyros			Sofianna					Paraskevi							Sofianna		George	Andreas																																															
Stavroula	Not in the Game																																																																
Stella	Not in the Game																																																																
Thomais	Not in the Game														Sofianna		George	Sofianna																																															
Giorikas	Valantis	Thanasis V.		Myriella	Myriella		Lambros					Myriella	Vrisiida	—N/a (Note: In Episode 20 & 21, Giorikas wasn't present at the council of the island, as he was in hospital due to illness. Also, he couldn't be voted by the players of Diasimoi tribe.)			Evacuated																																																
Thanasis V.	Valantis	Elizabeth		Valantis	Myriella		Lambros					Valantis	Giorikas	Lambros		Eliminated																																																	
Valantis	Giannis C.	Myriella		Myriella	Myriella		Lambros					Athena	Myriella	Eliminated																																																			
Krystallia			Spyros					—N/a (Note: In Episode 10 & 11, Krystallia wasn't present at the council of the island, as she was in hospital due to illness. Also, she couldn't be voted by the players of Machites tribe.)				Evacuated																																																					
Stamatis			Spyros					Paraskevi				Walked																																																					
Thanasis B.			Spyros					Paraskevi				Walked																																																					
Paraskevi			Spyros					Thanasis B.	Eliminated																																																								
Giannis C.	Valantis	Elizabeth		Valantis	Evridiki	Walked																																																											
Elizabeth	Giorikas	Giannis C.		Eliminated																																																													

== Matches ==
=== Team matches ===
Episode			Winner	Score	Reward
Week	No.	Air date	Winner	Score	Reward
1	1	December 26, 2021	Diasimoi	4-3	Survival Kit
1	1	December 26, 2021	Machites	10-9	Immunity Game
1	2	December 27, 2021	Machites	10-6	Immunity Game
1	3	December 28, 2021	Diasimoi	10-7	Immunity Game
1	4	December 29, 2021	Machites	10-4	Flour; Oil; Fire
2	5	January 2, 2022	Machites	10-8	Snorkel; Swimfin
2	5	January 2, 2022	Diasimoi	7-5	Quiz Game (Toast)
2	6	January 3, 2022	Machites	10-3	Immunity Game
2	7	January 4, 2022	Machites	10-7	Immunity Game
2	8	January 5, 2022	Machites	10-5	Lentils
3	9	January 8, 2022	Diasimoi	10-7	Honey
3	9	January 8, 2022	Machites	10-9	Quiz Game (Butter Croissant)
3	10	January 9, 2022	Machites	10-7	Immunity Game
3	11	January 10, 2022	Diasimoi	10-7	Immunity Game
3	12	January 11, 2022	Diasimoi	10-5	Communication Reward
3	13	January 12, 2022	Machites	10-5	Cheese pies
4	14	January 15, 2022	Diasimoi	10-9	Pulses
4	14	January 15, 2022	Machites	7-4	Quiz Game (Cereal with milk)
4	15	January 16, 2022	Machites	10-5	Immunity Game
4	16	January 17, 2022	Machites	10-7	Immunity Game
4	17	January 18, 2022	Diasimoi	10-9	Communication Reward
4	17	January 18, 2022	Diasimoi	5-0	Omelette
4	18	January 19, 2022	Machites	10-8	Jam
5	19	January 22, 2022	Diasimoi	10-3	Honey
5	19	January 22, 2022	Machites	10-6	Quiz Game (Crêpe)
5	20	January 23, 2022	Machites	10-8	Immunity Game
5	21	January 24, 2022	Diasimoi	10-5	Immunity Game
5	22	January 25, 2022	Machites	10-5	Communication Reward; French Fries; Coca-Cola
5	22	January 25, 2022	Machites	5-3	Peinirli
5	23	January 26, 2022	Machites	10-4	Toast; Tea
5	23	January 26, 2022	Machites	10-6	Fishing Kit
6	24	January 29, 2022	Diasimoi	10-6	Pizza
6	24	January 29, 2022	Diasimoi	5-0	Quiz Game (Vanilla Cap Cake)
6	25	January 30, 2022	Diasimoi	10-3	Immunity Game
6	26	January 31, 2022	Diasimoi	10-3	Immunity Game
6	27	February 1, 2022	Diasimoi	10-2	Communication Reward; Cookies and Juice
6	27	February 1, 2022	Diasimoi	10-2	Hot Dogs and potatoes
6	28	February 2, 2022	Diasimoi	10-8	Mini Pies
7	29	February 5, 2022	Diasimoi	10-7	
7	30	February 6, 2022	Machites	10-7	Immunity Game
7	31	February 7, 2022	Machites	10-9	Immunity Game
7	32	February 8, 2022	Diasimoi	10-6	Communication Reward
7	32	February 8, 2022	Diasimoi	5-4	
7	33	February 9, 2022	Diasimoi	2-1	
8	34	February 12, 2022	Diasimoi	10-8	
8	35	February 13, 2022	Diasimoi	10-8	Immunity Game
8	36	February 14, 2022	Diasimoi	10-4	Immunity Game
8	37	February 15, 2022	Diasimoi	10-5	Communication Reward
8	38	February 16, 2022	Machites	2-0	
9	39	February 19, 2022	Machites	10-3	
9	40	February 20, 2022	Machites	10-7	Immunity Game
9	41	February 21, 2022	Machites	10-5	Immunity Game
9	42	February 22, 2022	Diasimoi	10-9	Communication Reward
9	43	February 23, 2022	Machites	10-3	
9	43	February 23, 2022	Diasimoi	5-4	
10	44	February 26, 2022	Machites	10-8	
10	45	February 27, 2022	Machites	10-7	Immunity Game
10	46	February 28, 2022	Diasimoi	10-6	Immunity Game
10	47	March 1, 2022	Machites	2-0	Communication Reward
10	48	March 2, 2022	Machites	10-7	
11	49	March 5, 2022	Machites	10-9	
11	50	March 6, 2022	Diasimoi	2-1	Immunity Game
11	51	March 7, 2022	Diasimoi	2-1	Immunity Game
11	52	March 8, 2022	Diasimoi	2-1	Communication Reward
11	53	March 9, 2022	Diasimoi	2-1	
12	54	March 12, 2022	Machites	2-1	
12	55	March 13, 2022	Diasimoi	2-0	Immunity Game
12	56	March 14, 2022	Machites	2-1	Immunity Game
12	57	March 15, 2022	Diasimoi	2-0	Communication Reward
12	57	March 15, 2022	Machites	5-3	
12	58	March 16, 2022	Diasimoi	12-7	
13	59	March 19, 2022	Blue	12-5	
13	60	March 20, 2022	Blue	12-7	Immunity Game
13	61	March 21, 2022	Red	15-10	Immunity Game
13	62	March 22, 2022	Red	12-7	Communication Reward
13	63	March 23, 2022	Blue	12-9	
14	64	March 26, 2022	Red	2-1	
14	65	March 27, 2022	Blue	2-1	Immunity Game
14	66	March 28, 2022	Blue	2-1	Immunity Game
14	67	March 29, 2022	Red	2-0	Communication Reward
14	67	March 29, 2022	Blue	3-0	
14	68	March 30, 2022	Blue	2-0	
15	69	April 2, 2022	Blue	2-0	
15	70	April 3, 2022	Red	2-1	Immunity Game
15	71	April 4, 2022	Red	2-1	Immunity Game
15	72	April 5, 2022	Blue	2-1	Communication Reward
15	73	April 6, 2022	Red	2-1	
16	74	April 9, 2022	Red	2-0	
16	75	April 10, 2022	Red	2-0	Immunity Game
16	76	April 11, 2022	Blue	2-1	Immunity Game
16	77	April 12, 2022	Blue	2-1	Communication Reward
16	78	April 13, 2022	Blue	2-1	
17	79	April 16, 2022	Spyros		Join Party
17	80	April 17, 2022	Blue	2-0	Immunity Game
17	81	April 18, 2022	Red	2-1	Immunity Game
17	82	April 19, 2022	Red	2-0	Communication Reward
18	83	April 25, 2022	Blue	7-5	
18	83	April 25, 2022	Red	10-9	Trip to Miami
18	84	April 26, 2022	Red	10-4	
18	85	April 27, 2022	Red	10-7	Communication Reward
19	86	April 30, 2022	Blue	10-5	
19	87	May 1, 2022	Red	10-9	Game with the Turkish teams
19	88	May 2, 2022	Blue	2-0	Immunity Game
19	89	May 3, 2022	Blue	2-1	Immunity Game
19	90	May 4, 2022	Red	2-0	Communication Reward
20	91	May 7, 2022	Blue	10-5	
20	92	May 8, 2022	Blue	2-0	Immunity Game
20	93	May 9, 2022	Red	2-0	Immunity Game
20	94	May 10, 2022	Blue	2-1	Immunity Game
20	95	May 11, 2022	Red	2-0	Communication Reward
21	96	May 15, 2022	Blue	2-1	
21	97	May 16, 2022	Blue		Game with the Turkish teams
21	98	May 17, 2022	Blue	2-0	Immunity Game
21	99	May 18, 2022	Blue	2-1	Immunity Game
21	100	May 19, 2022	Red	2-0	Communication Reward
22	101	May 22, 2022	Blue	2-1	Immunity Game
22	102	May 23, 2022	Red	2-1	Immunity Game
22	103	May 24, 2022	Blue	10-3	
22	104	May 25, 2022	Blue	10-5	Communication Reward
22	105	May 26, 2022	Blue		Game with the Turkish teams
23	106	May 29, 2022	Blue	10-7	Trip to Mexico
23	107	May 30, 2022	Blue	2-0	Immunity Game
23	108	May 31, 2022	Blue	2-0	Immunity Game
23	109	June 1, 2022	Blue	2-0	Communication Reward
23	110	June 2, 2022	Blue	2-0	
24	111	June 5, 2022	Blue	2-0	
24	112	June 6, 2022	Blue	2-0	Immunity Game
24	113	June 7, 2022	Red	2-1	Immunity Game
24	114	June 8, 2022	Blue	2-0	
24	115	June 9, 2022	Blue	2-0	
25	116	June 12, 2022	Blue	2-0	
25	117	June 13, 2022	Aris		Immunity Game
25	118	June 14, 2022	Aris		Immunity Game
25	119	June 15, 2022	Thomais		Immunity Game
25	120	June 16, 2022	Red	2-0	
26	121	June 19, 2022	Aris		
26	122	June 20, 2022	Aris		Immunity Game
26	123	June 21, 2022	Aris		Immunity Game
26	124	June 22, 2022	Nikos		Immunity Game
26	125	June 23, 2022	Asimina		
27	126	June 26, 2022	Aris		Immunity Game
27	127	June 27, 2022	Nikos		Immunity Game
27	128	June 28, 2022	Aris		
27	129	June 29, 2022	Aris		Immunity Game
27	130	June 30, 2022	Aris		Immunity Game
28	131	July 3, 2022	Aris		
28	132	July 4, 2022	Stathis		1st Qualified to Semi-Final
28	132	July 4, 2022	Aris		2nd Qualified to Semi-Final

=== Individual matches ===
Episode			Winner	Reward
Week	No.	Air date	Winner	Reward
2	6	January 3, 2022	Giannis C.	Immunity Challenge
3	10	January 9, 2022	Athena	Immunity Challenge
3	11	January 10, 2022	Spyros	Immunity Challenge
4	15	January 16, 2022	Lambros	Immunity Challenge
5	20	January 23, 2022	Myriella	Immunity Challenge
5	21	January 24, 2022	Savvas	Immunity Challenge
6	25	January 30, 2022	Spyros	Immunity Challenge
7	30	February 6, 2022	Vrisiida	Immunity Challenge
8	35	February 13, 2022	Savvas	Immunity Challenge
9	40	February 20, 2022	Aris	Immunity Challenge
10	45	February 27, 2022	Apostolos	Immunity Challenge
10	46	February 28, 2022	Savvas	Immunity Challenge
11	50	March 6, 2022	Thomais	Immunity Challenge
12	55	March 13, 2022	Asimina	Immunity Challenge
12	56	March 14, 2022	Nafsika	Immunity Challenge
13	60	March 20, 2022	George	Immunity Challenge
13	61	March 21, 2022	Aris	Immunity Challenge
14	65	March 27, 2022	Nafsika	Immunity Challenge
15	70	April 3, 2022	Sofianna	Immunity Challenge
16	75	April 10, 2022	Sofianna	Immunity Challenge
16	76	April 11, 2022	Stathis	Immunity Challenge
17	80	April 17, 2022	Nafsika	Immunity Challenge
17	81	April 18, 2022	Konstantinos	Immunity Challenge
19	87	May 1, 2022	Stella	Immunity Challenge
20	92	May 8, 2022	Nafsika	Immunity Challenge
20	93	May 9, 2022	Takis	Immunity Challenge
21	98	May 17, 2022	Stella	Immunity Challenge
22	102	May 23, 2022	Aris	Immunity Challenge
23	107	May 30, 2022	Giorgos T.	Immunity Challenge

== Finals ==
Episode	Winner	Notes
132	Stathis; Aris	Stathis and Aris won the immunity and qualify to the semifinal.
133	Asimina; ~~Thomais~~	Asimina and Thomais who didn't win the immunity, went through the public vote to qualify to the Semi-final. Asimina qualified and Thomais was eliminated.
133	Aris; Stathis; ~~Asimina~~	At the Semifinal the last three contestants went through public vote and the two would qualify to the grand final. Aris and Stathis qualified and Asimina was eliminated.
134	Stathis Schizas	At the Final, Stathis Schizas was named Sole Survivor 2022. Season finale

== Ratings ==
Official ratings are taken from AGB Hellas.

Week	Episode	Air date	Timeslot (EET)	Ratings	Viewers (in millions)	Rank		Share		Source
Week	Episode	Air date	Timeslot (EET)	Ratings	Viewers (in millions)	Daily	Weekly	Household	Adults 18-54	Source
1	1	December 26, 2021	Sunday 9:00pm	12.1%	1.250	#2	#9	27.6%	28.1%	
1	2	December 27, 2021	Monday 9:00pm	10.8%	1.118	#3	#11	24.1%	22.0%	
1	3	December 28, 2021	Tuesday 9:00pm	9.9%	1.028	#3	#12	22.6%	20.4%	
1	4	December 29, 2021	Wednesday 9:00pm	9.7%	1.006	#3	#14	21.3%	19.3%	
2	5	January 2, 2022	Sunday 9:00pm	11.4%	1.176	#2	#9	24.7%	21.9%	
2	6	January 3, 2022	Monday 9:00pm	11.1%	1.146	#3	#11	24.2%	21.6%	
2	7	January 4, 2022	Tuesday 9:00pm	10.1%	1.049	#3	#13	23.0%	25.3%	
2	8	January 5, 2022	Wednesday 9:00pm	12.0%	1.247	#2	#8	27.3%	26.6%	
3	9	January 8, 2022	Saturday 9:00pm	12.4%	1.288	#1	#7	28.2%	27.0%	
3	10	January 9, 2022	Sunday 9:00pm	13.8%	1.431	#2	#3	30.9%	30.7%	
3	11	January 10, 2022	Monday 9:00pm	9.2%	0.948	#3	#15	19.8%	21.0%	
3	12	January 11, 2022	Tuesday 9:00pm	9.6%	0.994	#3	#14	21.2%	21.7%	
3	13	January 12, 2022	Wednesday 9:00pm	11.1%	1.154	#3	#13	25.3%	27.2%	
4	14	January 15, 2022	Saturday 9:00pm	12.8%	1.327	#1	#7	29.2%	27.4%	
4	15	January 16, 2022	Sunday 9:00pm	12.6%	1.301	#2	#9	29.0%	22.4%	
4	16	January 17, 2022	Monday 9:00pm	9.0%	0.936	#4	#15	19.7%	19.3%	
4	17	January 18, 2022	Tuesday 9:00pm	9.0%	0.928	#3	#16	19.5%	18.7%	
4	18	January 19, 2022	Wednesday 9:00pm	11.8%	1.221	#3	#12	25.8%	24.9%	
5	19	January 22, 2022	Saturday 9:00pm	12.2%	1.264	#1	#11	26.9%	25.5%	
5	20	January 23, 2022	Sunday 9:00pm	12.8%	1.325	#2	#7	26.9%	25.7%	
5	21	January 24, 2022	Monday 9:00pm	10.1%	1.046	#3	#15	20.4%	13.5%	
5	22	January 25, 2022	Tuesday 9:00pm	9.3%	0.968	#5	#20	19.5%	20.2%	
5	23	January 26, 2022	Wednesday 9:00pm	11.3%	1.170	#3	#13	23.1%	22.4%	
6	24	January 29, 2022	Saturday 9:00pm	12.3%	1.270	#1	#10	27.6%	26.2%	
6	25	January 30, 2022	Sunday 9:00pm	12.2%	1.267	#2	#11	26.3%	27.0%	
6	26	January 31, 2022	Monday 9:00pm	8.9%	0.921	#3	#16	19.1%	18.6%	
6	27	February 1, 2022	Tuesday 9:00pm	8.5%	0.877	#5	#20	18.5%	23.2%	
6	28	February 2, 2022	Wednesday 9:00pm	10.3%	1.066	#3	#13	22.9%	22.5%	
7	29	February 5, 2022	Saturday 9:00pm	10.8%	1.114	#1	#12	24.4%	22.9%	
7	30	February 6, 2022	Sunday 9:00pm	12.0%	1.245	#2	#8	27.0%	25.3%	
7	31	February 7, 2022	Monday 9:00pm	9.2%	0.953	#4	#16	20.1%	19.4%	
7	32	February 8, 2022	Tuesday 9:00pm	8.6%	0.887	#3	#20	18.9%	19.0%	
7	33	February 9, 2022	Wednesday 9:00pm	9.1%	0.940	#3	#17	20.5%	21.7%	
8	34	February 12, 2022	Saturday 9:00pm	11.0%	1.136	#1	#13	25.1%	24.3%	
8	35	February 13, 2022	Sunday 9:00pm	11.7%	1.207	#2	#11	26.2%	27.3%	
8	36	February 14, 2022	Monday 9:00pm	9.8%	1.014	#3	#15	21.8%	22.6%	
8	37	February 15, 2022	Tuesday 9:00pm	9.2%	0.952	#4	#19	19.8%	20.7%	
8	38	February 16, 2022	Wednesday 9:00pm	10.7%	1.106	#3	#14	23.5%	21.3%	
9	39	February 19, 2022	Saturday 9:00pm	11.6%	1.199	#1	#11	25.1%	23.2%	
9	40	February 20, 2022	Sunday 9:00pm	11.5%	1.190	#2	#12	26.1%	26.6%	
9	41	February 21, 2022	Monday 9:00pm	8.9%	0.921	#3	#18	22.8%	17.1%	
9	42	February 22, 2022	Tuesday 9:00pm	9.1%	0.939	#4	#17	18.4%	18.8%	
9	43	February 23, 2022	Wednesday 9:00pm	9.9%	1.021	#4	#15	20.7%	20.3%	
10	44	February 26, 2022	Saturday 9:00pm	11.2%	1.155	#1	#10	24.2%	22.1%	
10	45	February 27, 2022	Sunday 9:00pm	10.5%	1.092	#2	#13	22.4%	21.1%	
10	46	February 28, 2022	Monday 9:00pm	8.2%	0.854	#3	#17	17.1%	17.6%	
10	47	March 1, 2022	Tuesday 9:00pm	8.3%	0.854	#4	#16	17.8%	16.1%	
10	48	March 2, 2022	Wednesday 9:00pm	8.6%	0.889	#3	#14	18.4%	17.8%	
10	-	March 3, 2022	Thursday 9:00pm	-	-	-	-	10.5%	10.2%	
11	49	March 5, 2022	Saturday 9:00pm	10.7%	1.113	#1	#11	25.6%	22.6%	
11	50	March 6, 2022	Sunday 9:00pm	9.5%	0.981	#2	#13	22.7%	22.8%	
11	51	March 7, 2022	Monday 9:00pm	8.2%	0.850	#3	-	17.8%	17.4%	
11	52	March 8, 2022	Tuesday 9:00pm	8.5%	0.883	#4	#20	18.4%	16.6%	
11	53	March 9, 2022	Wednesday 9:00pm	8.8%	0.909	#4	#17	19.4%	17.2%	
11	-	March 10, 2022	Thursday 9:00pm	-	-	-	-	10.1%	10.2%	
12	54	March 12, 2022	Saturday 9:00pm	10.1%	1.043	#1	#13	23.9%	18.9%	
12	55	March 13, 2022	Sunday 9:00pm	10.8%	1.114	#2	#11	24.2%	22.7%	
12	56	March 14, 2022	Monday 9:00pm	8.8%	0.915	#3	#19	20.2%	16.8%	
12	57	March 15, 2022	Tuesday 9:00pm	7.7%	0.799	#5	-	17.7%	15.9%	
12	58	March 16, 2022	Wednesday 9:00pm	9.2%	0.950	#4	#17	20.7%	18.2%	
12	-	March 17, 2022	Thursday 9:00pm	-	-	-	-	9.8%	8.4%	
13	59	March 19, 2022	Saturday 9:00pm	10.6%	1.095	#1	#12	25.1%	20.5%	
13	60	March 20, 2022	Sunday 9:00pm	11.4%	1.181	#2	#10	27.4%	25.5%	
13	61	March 21, 2022	Monday 9:00pm	7.6%	0.787	#6	-	15.7%	14.7%	
13	62	March 22, 2022	Tuesday 9:00pm	7.9%	0.819	#4	-	18.9%	18.9%	
13	63	March 23, 2022	Wednesday 9:00pm	9.1%	0.939	#4	#17	19.7%	19%	
14	64	March 26, 2022	Saturday 9:00pm	9.1%	0.941	#1	#16	23.3%	19.6%	
14	65	March 27, 2022	Sunday 9:00pm	11.1%	1.153	#2	#10	26.1%	25.8%	
14	66	March 28, 2022	Monday 9:00pm	8.3%	0.863	#3	#19	18.7%	19.3%	
14	67	March 29, 2022	Tuesday 9:00pm	7.8%	0.811	#4	-	18.1%	16.7%	
14	68	March 30, 2022	Wednesday 9:00pm	8.7%	0.905	#3	#15	19.1%	19.8%	
15	69	April 2, 2022	Saturday 9:00pm	9.8%	1.018	#1	#14	24.0%	21.9%	
15	70	April 3, 2022	Sunday 9:00pm	10.8%	1.123	#2	#12	25.1%	25.1%	
15	71	April 4, 2022	Monday 9:00pm	8.3%	0.860	#3	#20	18.8%	17.7%	
15	72	April 5, 2022	Tuesday 9:00pm	8.5%	0.879	#3	#19	20.3%	25.9%	
15	73	April 6, 2022	Wednesday 9:00pm	8.8%	0.910	#3	#15	20.8%	18.6%	
16	74	April 9, 2022	Saturday 9:00pm	9.2%	0.956	#1	#14	23.8%	21.2%	
16	75	April 10, 2022	Sunday 9:00pm	9.8%	1.014	#2	#13	23.5%	23.6%	
16	76	April 11, 2022	Monday 9:00pm	8.7%	0.902	#3	#15	19.8%	18.6%	
16	77	April 12, 2022	Tuesday 9:00pm	8.5%	0.876	#4	#17	20.0%	18.5%	
16	78	April 13, 2022	Wednesday 9:00pm	9.1%	0.940	#3	#13	21.5%	18.9%	
17	79	April 16, 2022	Saturday 9:00pm	9.9%	1.021	#1	#10	28.5%	24.5%	
17	80	April 17, 2022	Sunday 9:00pm	9.7%	1.004	#2	#11	22.2%	20.8%	
17	81	April 18, 2022	Monday 9:00pm	8.8%	0.911	#3	#7	21.5%	19.9%	
17	82	April 19, 2022	Tuesday 9:00pm	9.9%	1.021	#3	#6	23.7%	21.5%	
18	83	April 25, 2022	Monday 9:00pm	9.4%	0.977	#1	#7	27.7%	21.8%	
18	84	April 26, 2022	Tuesday 9:00pm	9.0%	0.928	#2	#8	23.8%	21.5%	
18	85	April 27, 2022	Wednesday 9:00pm	8.5%	0.876	#2	#11	22.7%	19.3%	
19	86	April 30, 2022	Saturday 9:00pm	8.7%	0.902	#1	#10	24.9%	19.6%	
19	87	May 1, 2022	Sunday 9:00pm	10.0%	1.030	#2	#5	25.3%	22.8%	
19	88	May 2, 2022	Monday 9:00pm	8.9%	0.925	#3	#14	19.8%	18.8%	
19	89	May 3, 2022	Tuesday 9:00pm	8.6%	0.886	#3	#15	20.9%	20.8%	
19	90	May 4, 2022	Wednesday 9:00pm	9.0%	0.932	#3	#13	21.3%	19.1%	
20	91	May 7, 2022	Saturday 9:00pm	9.0%	0.934	#1	#12	24.1%	21.6%	
20	92	May 8, 2022	Sunday 9:00pm	9.6%	0.995	#2	#10	23.4%	20.7%	
20	93	May 9, 2022	Monday 9:00pm	8.5%	0.879	#3	#14	20.7%	18.8%	
20	94	May 10, 2022	Tuesday 9:00pm	7.6%	0.783	#3	#17	18.5%	16.8%	
20	95	May 11, 2022	Wednesday 9:00pm	8.3%	0.859	#3	#15	20.4%	19.2%	
21	96	May 15, 2022	Sunday 9:00pm	10.7%	1.107	#3	#12	28.7%	25.6%	
21	97	May 16, 2022	Monday 9:00pm	7.1%	0.732	#5	-	17.8%	15.5%	
21	98	May 17, 2022	Tuesday 9:00pm	7.7%	0.793	#4	#17	18.9%	16.9%	
21	99	May 18, 2022	Wednesday 9:00pm	7.9%	0.816	#3	#14	19.9%	18.0%	
21	100	May 19, 2022	Thursday 9:00pm	7.5%	0.773	#4	#18	18.7%	18.2%	
22	101	May 22, 2022	Sunday 9:00pm	9.6%	0.996	#1	#11	25.1%	19.5%	
22	102	May 23, 2022	Monday 9:00pm	8.0%	0.829	#3	#14	18.9%	17.4%	
22	103	May 24, 2022	Tuesday 9:00pm	7.9%	0.817	#4	#17	19.2%	16.5%	
22	104	May 25, 2022	Wednesday 9:00pm	8.0%	0.823	#3	#16	19.0%	16.4%	
22	105	May 26, 2022	Thursday 9:00pm	7.1%	0.731	#4	-	18.0%	16.8%	
23	106	May 29, 2022	Sunday 9:00pm	10.0%	1.031	#1	#12	24.4%	19.9%	
23	107	May 30, 2022	Monday 9:00pm	7.4%	0.762	#4	#18	17.3%	16.2%	
23	108	May 31, 2022	Tuesday 9:00pm	7.1%	0.732	#4	#20	19.2%	16.5%	
23	109	June 1, 2022	Wednesday 9:00pm	7.2%	0.747	#4	#19	18.2%	15.8%	
23	110	June 2, 2022	Thursday 9:00pm	7.7%	0.797	#3	#16	19.6%	18.5%	
24	111	June 5, 2022	Sunday 9:00pm	7.6%	0.784	#2	#17	21.8%	16.6%	
24	112	June 6, 2022	Monday 9:00pm	6.8%	0.700	#4	#20	17.0%	15.0%	
24	113	June 7, 2022	Tuesday 9:00pm	6.9%	0.714	#3	#19	18.4%	17.1%	
24	114	June 8, 2022	Wednesday 9:00pm	6.7%	0.689	#4	-	16.1%	13.7%	
24	115	June 9, 2022	Thursday 9:00pm	7.0%	0.728	#4	#18	20.6%	19.3%	
25	116	June 12, 2022	Sunday 9:00pm	7.9%	0.822	#2	#14	22.2%	18.9%	
25	117	June 13, 2022	Monday 9:00pm	7.7%	0.797	#4	#15	18.5%	17.1%	
25	118	June 14, 2022	Tuesday 9:00pm	6.8%	0.699	#3	#18	16.3%	14.6%	
25	119	June 15, 2022	Wednesday 9:00pm	6.9%	0.716	#4	#17	17.2%	15.7%	
25	120	June 16, 2022	Thursday 9:00pm	7.4%	0.764	#4	#16	19.3%	17.7%	
26	121	June 19, 2022	Sunday 9:00pm	8.0%	0.829	#1	#12	23.4%	19.8%	
26	122	June 20, 2022	Monday 9:00pm	6.7%	0.689	#4	#17	16.0%	14.5%	
26	123	June 21, 2022	Tuesday 9:00pm	6.6%	0.686	#4	#18	16.6%	14.6%	
26	124	June 22, 2022	Wednesday 9:00pm	6.3%	0.657	#4	#19	16.4%	14.7%	
26	125	June 23, 2022	Thursday 9:00pm	6.9%	0.716	#4	-	18.8%	15.4%	
27	126	June 26, 2022	Sunday 9:00pm	7.8%	0.808	#1	#13	24.5%	19.5%	
27	127	June 27, 2022	Monday 9:00pm	5.9%	0.611	#4	#16	15.5%	14.3%	
27	128	June 28, 2022	Tuesday 9:00pm	6.2%	0.641	#4	#15	18.2%	14.2%	
27	129	June 29, 2022	Wednesday 9:00pm	6.8%	0.705	#4	#12	17.9%	14.2%	
27	130	June 30, 2022	Thursday 9:00pm	6.3%	0.648	#3	#14	16.7%	15.7%	
28	131	July 3, 2022	Sunday 9:00pm	6.5%	0.675	#1	#13	21.7%	15.5%	
28	132	July 4, 2022	Monday 9:00pm	6.9%	0.716	#3	#11	19.0%	13.9%	
28	133	July 5, 2022	Tuesday 9:00pm	8.0%	0.829	#3	#8	26.3%	21.6%	SEMI-FINAL
28	134	July 6, 2022	Wednesday 9:00pm	7.7%	0.801	#3	#9	25.3%	21.8%	FINAL
