= Survivor Greece season 8 =

Survivor Greece
- Season 8
- Presented by: Giorgos Lianos
- No. of castaways: 34
- Winner: Sakis Katsoulis
- Runner-up: Ilias Bogdanos
- Location: La Romana, Dominican Republic
- No. of episodes: 108

Release
- Original network: Skai TV
- Original release: December 27, 2020 – July 5, 2021

Additional information
- Filming dates: December 20, 2020 – July 5, 2021

Season chronology
- ← Previous season 7 Next → Season 9

The eighth season of Survivor Greece, the Greek version of the popular reality show Survivor, began airing on December 27, 2020 on Skai TV and also in Cyprus on Sigma TV. Giorgos Lianos host alone for the first time, as Sakis Tanimanidis decided not to be a host for this season, due to his wife's pregnancy. Ten players and ten celebrities, who have been known in Greece through their work, are invited to survive on a deserted island, the exotic La Romana in Dominican Republic, having their luggage, the necessary clothes and basic food supply.

For the first time in the show, the nominations for the elimination can be from both tribes in each week. The TV viewers votes for their favorite player and not favorite player. The Most Popular player by the public vote will have immunity and must give a name to be nominated for eviction. Then all contestants have to nominate and then two are nominated for eviction, the player with the fewest votes from the previous TV viewers votes is eliminated. Since week 5, the voting system changed. So, a player is immuted if he won a challenge for the immunity and won't be voted by his tribe. Also, the player will be eliminated if he has the fewest votes to be saved from the public vote between the nominated players and not from the Most Popular Player voting. This is also the same voting system, as in the last three previous seasons.

== Contestants ==
The names of the original tribes were Mαχητές (Machites, meaning warriors), and Διάσημοι (Diasimoi, meaning celebrities). On the first week 20 contestants entered the game. On the second week, Anthi Salagoudi and Asimina Igglezou entered the game. On the third week, Elizabeth Elechi entered the game. In Episode 14, the tribes were switched, so the new tribe are the Red Tribe and the Blue Tribe. On the fifth week, Marianthi Kasdagli and Valeria Chopsonidou entered the game. On the sixth week, Ilias Bogdanos, Dimitris Makropoulos and Carolina Kalyva entered the game. On the ninth week, Christina Kefala, George Tavladakis, Nikoleta Mavridi, Pavlos Galakteros and Sakis Katsoulis entered the game. On the tenth week, Eleni Chamberi entered the game as the last player. In Episode 57 the Tribes are switched again and created the new Red tribe and the new Blue tribe.

List of Survivor Greece season 8 contestants
Contestant	Original tribe	Switched tribe	New tribe	Merged tribe	Statistics	Finish
Elena Liliopoulou; 24, Kallithea, Baker	Machites				50%	Walked; Episode 2
Mike Arnaoutis; 41, Athens, Boxer	Diasimoi				38%	1st Voted Out; Episode 4
Angeliki Lampri; 45, Ioannina, Actress	Diasimoi				23%	2nd Voted Out; Episode 8
Katia Tarabanko; 24, Mariupol, Model	Diasimoi				65%	Evacuated; Episode 13
Elizabeth Elechi; 37, Athens, TV Reporter	Diasimoi	Red			52%	3rd Voted Out; Episode 16
Asimina Igglezou; 41, Athens, Mountain Jogging Athlete	Machites	Red			35%	4th Voted Out; Episode 20
Valeria Chopsonidou; 32, Thessaloniki, Sportswear Designer		Blue			29%	5th Voted Out; Episode 24
Dimitris Makropoulos; 30, Athens, Agronomist		Blue			29%	6th Voted Out; Episode 28
Elena Mariposa Kremlidou; 24, Thessaloniki, Instagrammer	Machites	Blue			60%	Walked; Episode 30
Pericles Kondylatos; 41, Athens, Jewelry Designer	Diasimoi	Red			35%	7th Voted Out; Episode 32
Anthi Salagoudi; 36, Thessaloniki, Journalist, Presenter	Diasimoi	Red			17%	8th Voted Out; Episode 36
Sofia Margariti; 41, Trikala, Car Mechanic	Machites	Red			60%	Evacuated; Episode 40
Chris Stamoulis; 31, Thessaloniki, Lawyer	Machites	Blue			48%	9th Voted Out; Episode 40
George Tavladakis; 37, Crete, Public Relations		Blue			53%	10th Voted Out; Episode 44
Panos Kalidis; 43, Drama, Singer	Diasimoi	Blue			22%	Walked; Episode 45
George Kopsidas; 45, Athens, Actor	Diasimoi	Red			57%	11th Voted Out; Episode 48
Anna Maria Velli; 30, Athens, YouTuber, Actress	Diasimoi	Blue			55%	12th Voted Out; Episode 52
Marianthi Kasdagli; 29, Thessaloniki, Merchant Navy Lieutenant		Red			49%	13th Voted Out; Episode 56
Christina Kefala; 28, Athens, Model		Blue	Blue		39%	14th Voted Out; Episode 60
Eleftheria Eleftheriou; 31, Paralimni, Singer	Diasimoi	Blue	Red		31%	15th Voted Out; Episode 64
Alexis Pappas; 34, Actor	Diasimoi	Blue	Red		47%	16th Voted Out; Episode 68
Costas Papadopoulos; 36, Russia, Pastry Chef	Machites	Red	Blue		47%	17th Voted Out; Episode 72
Pavlos Galakteros; 23, Thessaloniki, Audio & Light Expert		Red	Blue		46%	18th Voted Out; Episode 75
James Kafetzis; 24, Rhodes, Boat Party Organizer	Machites	Blue	Blue		64%	Walked; Episode 78
Nikos Bartzis; 26, Corinth, Farmer	Machites	Blue	Blue		50%	Evacuated; Episode 80
Nikoleta Mavridi; 26, Athens, Dancer		Red	Red	Merged Tribe	42%	19th Voted Out; Episode 83
Triantaphillos Chatzinicolaou; 43, Rhodes, Singer	Diasimoi	Red	Red	Merged Tribe	25%	20th Voted Out; Episode 91
Carolina Jacqueline Kalyva; 31, Toronto, Pilates Instructor		Red	Red	Merged Tribe	55%	21st Voted Out; Episode 95
Eleni Haberi; 26, Volos, Personal Trainer		Red	Blue	Merged Tribe	49%	22nd Voted Out; Episode 99
George Asimakopoulos; 29, Patras, Fashion Designer	Machites	Red	Red	Merged Tribe	43%	23rd Voted Out; Episode 103
George "Koro" Koromi; 33, Athens, Businessman	Machites	Red	Blue	Merged Tribe	47%	Quarter-Final; Episode 107
Marialena Roumelioti; 25, Athens, Personal Trainer	Machites	Blue	Blue	Merged Tribe	55%	Semi-Final; Episode 107
Ilias Bogdanos; 29, Athens, Singer		Red	Red	Merged Tribe	58%	Runner Up; Episode 108
Sakis Katsoulis; 30, Euboea, Businessman		Blue	Red	Merged Tribe	73%	Sole Survivor; Episode 108

== Voting history ==
=== Nominations table ===
	Original tribes								Switched tribes																									New tribes														Merged Tribe													
Week #	1			2 (Note: Anthi and Asimina, as the new players, had immunity for the second week.)		3 (Note: Elizabeth, as the new player, had immunity for the third week.) (Note: Elimination cancelled, because Katia had a very serious illness, so it is unknown if she continues and the tribe of Diasimoi is very weak at matches. The votes for the Most Popular Player of Diasimoi will be added in the next voting, when Diasimoi lose the Immunity.)		4			5 (Note: Marianthi and Valeria, as the new players, had immunity for the 5th week.)		6 (Note: Carolina, Dimitris and Ilias, as the new players, had immunity for the 6th week.)		7		8			9 (Note: Christina, George T., Nikoleta, Pavlos and Sakis, as the new players, had immunity for the 9th week.)		10 (Note: Eleni, as a new player, had immunity for the 10th week.)			11		12 (Note: In Episode 45, Panos announced that he walked from the game as he believed he didn't deserve to reach so high in that game.)			13		14		15 (Note: In Episode 57, new tribes were announced as the switched tribes were cancelled.)		16		17		18		19		20			21			23		24			25			26			27
Episode #	2 (Note: In Episode 2, Elena Liliopoulou decided to leave the game, as she said she couldn't live in such bad conditions.)	4		8		12		13 (Note: In Episode 13, Katia Tarabanko evacuated from the game, due to her serious health issues.)	16		20		24		28		30 (Note: In Episode 30, Elena Mariposa Kremlidou walked from the game, due to health issues.)	32		36		40			44		45	48		52		56		60		64		68		72		75		79 (Note: After James walked from the game, the elimination was cancelled.)		78 (Note: James after the voting of the second council, decided to walk from the game as he thinks he cannot continue to play in these conditions.)	80	83		91		95			99			103			104
Tribe	Machites	Diasimoi	Diasimoi	Diasimoi	Machites	Diasimoi	Diasimoi	Diasimoi	Red	Red	Red	Red	Blue	Blue	Blue	Blue	Blue	Blue	Red	Red	Red	Red	Blue	Blue	Blue	Red	Blue	Red	Red	Blue	Blue	Red	Red	Red	Blue	Blue	Red	Red	Red	Blue	Red	Blue	Blue	Blue	Blue	Blue	Blue	Merge													
Nominated by Group	No One	George K. Triantaphillos	Anna Maria; Mike	Angeliki	Costas	George K. Panos	Anthi	No One	Anthi	Pericles	Asimina	Anthi	Valeria	Eleftheria	Eleftheria	Chris	No One	Alexis	Anthi	Anthi	Sofia	No One	Chris	Alexis	Nikos	Marianthi	No One	Triantaphillos	Marianthi	Anna Maria	James	Triantaphillos	Marianthi	Triantaphillos	Christina	Costas	Triantaphillos	Triantaphillos	Alexis	Costas	Triantaphillos	James	Nikos	Koro	James	No One		Triantaphillos	Marialena	Triantaphillos	Marialena	No One									
Votes	No One	4-4-1-1	3-3-2-2	5-3-2	6-4	4-4-2	6-4	No One	8-2	7-2-1	6-2-1-1	7-2-1	6-2-1-1-1	5-3-2-1	7-1-1	4-2-1-1-1	No One	6-1-1	6-1-1-1-1-1	6-4-2	8-4	No One	5-4-2	9-2	5-3-2	9-1-1	No One	9-2	9-2	4-3-1	5-3	8-1-1	8-1-1	6-2	6-2	6-1	4-3-1	4-3	4-3	6-1	4-2	4-2	4-2	3-2	3-2	No One		8-1	5-4	7-1	5-3	—N/a									
Most Popular Player (Immune)	No One	Katia		Katia	Nikos	Unknown		No One	Anthi; George K.		No One						No One	No One				No One	No One				No One	No One																		No One		No One													
Immunity	No One	No One						No One	No One		George K.		Nikos		Alexis		No One	Panos	Koro	Carolina		No One	James		Anna Maria	Koro	No One	Nicoleta		Nikos		Pavlos		Ilias	Koro	Nikos	Ilias	Sakis		Pavlos	Ilias	Koro		Nikos		No One		George A.	Sakis	Carolina	Sakis	Sakis	Marialena	Ilias	Sakis	Sakis	Sakis	Koro	Sakis	Sakis	—N/a
Nominated by Immune	No One	Angeliki		Eleftheria	Sofia	No One		No One	Elizabeth; Asimina		Pericles		Mariposa		Dimitris		No One	Chris	Pericles	Marianthi		No One	Panos		George T.	Triantaphillos	No One	George K.		Christina		Eleni		Alexis	Costas	Pavlos	Eleftheria	George A.		James	George A.	Pavlos		Marialena		No One		Sakis	Nicoleta	Sakis	Carolina	Carolina	Eleni	Marialena	Eleni	George A.	Koro	Marialena	George A.	Koro	—N/a
Against public vote	No One	Angeliki; Anna Maria; George K. Mike; Triantaphillos		Angeliki; Costas; Eleftheria; Sofia		Anthi; George K. Panos		No One	Asimina; Elizabeth; Pericles		Anthi; Asimina; Pericles		Eleftheria; Mariposa; Valeria		Chris; Dimitris; Eleftheria		No One	Alexis; Anthi; Chris; Pericles		Anthi; Marianthi; Sofia		No One	Alexis; Chris; Panos		George T. Marianthi; Nikos; Triantaphillos		No One	George K. Marianthi; Triantaphillos		Anna Maria; Christina; James		Eleni; Marianthi; Triantaphillos		Alexis; Christina; Costas; Triantaphillos		Costas; Eleftheria; Pavlos; Triantaphillos		Alexis; George A. Triantaphillos		Costas; George A. James; Triantaphillos		James; Nikos; Pavlos		James; Koro; Marialena		No One		Triantaphillos; Sakis; Marialena; Nicoleta		Triantaphillos; Sakis; Marialena; Carolina		Carolina; Eleni; Marialena			Eleni; George A. Koro			Marialena; George A. Koro			—N/a
Eliminated	Elena; Walked	Mike; Fewest votes to most popular player		Angeliki; Fewest votes to most popular player		Elimination; Cancelled		Katia; Evacuated	Elizabeth; Fewest votes to most popular player		Asimina; Fewest votes by public to save		Valeria; Fewest votes by public to save		Dimitris; Fewest votes by public to save		Mariposa; Walked	Pericles; Fewest votes by public to save		Anthi; Fewest votes by public to save		Sofia; Evacuated	Chris; Fewest votes by public to save		George T. Fewest votes by public to save		Panos; Walked	George K. Fewest votes by public to save		Anna Maria; Fewest votes by public to save		Marianthi; Fewest votes by public to save		Christina; Fewest votes by public to save		Eleftheria; Fewest votes by public to save		Alexis; Fewest votes by public to save		Costas; Fewest votes by public to save		Pavlos; Fewest votes by public to save		Elimination; Cancelled		James; Walked	Nikos; Evacuated	Nicoleta; Fewest votes by public to save		Triantaphillos; Fewest votes by public to save		Carolina; Fewest votes by public to save			Eleni; Fewest votes by public to save			George A. Fewest votes by public to save			—N/a
Voter	Vote																																																												
Koro					Nikos				Anthi	Pericles	Asimina	Anthi							Anthi	Anthi	Sofia					Marianthi		Triantaphillos	Marianthi			Triantaphillos	Marianthi		Christina	Costas				Costas		James	Nikos	James	James			Triantaphillos	Marialena	Triantaphillos	Marialena										Finalist
Marialena					Costas								Mariposa	Eleftheria	Eleftheria	Chris		Alexis					Chris	Alexis	James					James	James				Costas	Costas				Costas		James	Nikos	Koro	James			Triantaphillos	Nicoleta	Triantaphillos	Carolina										Finalist
Ilias	Not in the Game																		Anthi	Anthi	Sofia					Marianthi		Triantaphillos	Marianthi			Triantaphillos	Marianthi	Triantaphillos			Triantaphillos	Triantaphillos	Alexis		Triantaphillos							Triantaphillos	Marialena	Triantaphillos	Marialena										Finalist
Sakis	Not in the Game																						Chris	Alexis	Nikos					Anna Maria	James			Triantaphillos			Eleftheria	George A.	George A.		George A.							Triantaphillos	Nicoleta	Triantaphillos	Carolina										Finalist
George A.					Nikos				Anthi	Pericles	Asimina	Anthi							Anthi	Anthi	Sofia					Marianthi		Triantaphillos	Marianthi			Triantaphillos	Marianthi	Triantaphillos			Triantaphillos	Triantaphillos	Alexis		Triantaphillos							Triantaphillos	Marialena	Triantaphillos	Marialena										Eliminated
Eleni	Not in the Game																									Marianthi		Triantaphillos	Marianthi			Triantaphillos	Marianthi		Christina	Costas				Costas		James	Nikos	James	James			Triantaphillos	Marialena	Triantaphillos	Marialena							Eliminated			
Carolina	Not in the Game																		Costas	Sofia	Sofia					Marianthi		Triantaphillos	Marianthi			Triantaphillos	Marianthi	Triantaphillos			Triantaphillos	Triantaphillos	Alexis		Triantaphillos							Triantaphillos	Nicoleta	Triantaphillos	Marialena				Eliminated						
Triantaphillos		George K.	Eleftheria	Angeliki		Panos	Anthi		Anthi	Pericles	Asimina	Anthi							Anthi	Anthi	Sofia					Marianthi		Koro	Koro			Ilias	Costas	George A.			Nicoleta	George A.	George A.		George A.							Nicoleta	Nicoleta	George A.	Carolina	Eliminated									
Nicoleta	Not in the Game																			Anthi	Sofia					Marianthi		Triantaphillos	Marianthi			Triantaphillos	Marianthi	Triantaphillos			Triantaphillos	Triantaphillos	Alexis		Triantaphillos							Triantaphillos	Marialena	Eliminated											
Nikos					Costas								Valeria	Eleftheria	Eleftheria	James		Alexis					Chris	Alexis	Panos					Eleftheria	Eleftheria				Christina	Costas				Costas		Pavlos	Pavlos	Koro	Eleni			Evacuated													
James					Costas								Valeria	Mariposa	Eleftheria	Nikos		Alexis					Christina	Alexis	Panos					Eleftheria	Eleftheria				Christina	Costas				Costas		Pavlos	Pavlos	Koro	Eleni		Walked														
Pavlos	Not in the Game																			Anthi	Sofia					Costas		Triantaphillos	Marianthi			Triantaphillos	Marianthi		Christina	Costas				Costas		James	Nikos	Eliminated																	
Costas					Nikos				Anthi	Pericles	Asimina	Anthi							Anthi	Triantaphillos	Triantaphillos					Marianthi		Triantaphillos	Marianthi			Triantaphillos	Marianthi		Christina	Pavlos				James		Eliminated																			
Alexis		George K.	Anna Maria	Angeliki		Panos	Anthi						Valeria	Eleftheria	Eleftheria	Dimitris		Nikos					Panos	Panos	Nikos					Anna Maria	James			George A.			Nicoleta	George A.	George A.	Eliminated																					
Eleftheria		Triantaphillos	Mike	Angeliki		George K.	Katia						Anna Maria	Anna Maria	Anna Maria	Chris		Alexis					Panos	Alexis	Nikos					Anna Maria	James			Triantaphillos			Nicoleta	Eliminated																							
Christina	Not in the Game																						Panos	Alexis	Nikos					Anna Maria	James				Costas	Eliminated																									
Marianthi	Not in the Game										Anthi	Anthi							Sofia	Triantaphillos	Triantaphillos					Triantaphillos		Koro	Koro			Koro	George A.	Eliminated																											
Anna Maria		Triantaphillos	Alexis	George K.		George K.	Katia						Valeria	Eleftheria	Eleftheria	Chris		Alexis					Chris	Alexis	Panos					Eleftheria	Eleftheria	Eliminated																													
George K.		Triantaphillos	Mike	Angeliki		Panos	Anthi		Anthi	Pericles	Asimina	Anthi							Anthi	Sofia	Sofia					Marianthi		Triantaphillos	Marianthi	Eliminated																															
Panos		George K.	Anna Maria	George K.		Anthi	Anthi						Valeria	Eleftheria	Dimitris	Chris		Alexis					Chris	Alexis	Nikos			Walked																																	
George T.	Not in the Game																						Christina	Alexis	James		Eliminated																																		
Chris					Costas								Valeria	Mariposa	Eleftheria	Dimitris		James					Panos	Panos	Eliminated																																				
Sofia					Nikos				Anthi	Pericles	Asimina	Anthi							Marianthi	Triantaphillos	Triantaphillos		Evacuated																																						
Anthi	Not in the Game			George K.		George K.	Katia		George K.	George K.	Triantaphillos	Triantaphillos							Triantaphillos	Triantaphillos	Triantaphillos	Eliminated																																							
Pericles		Anna Maria	Anna Maria	Triantaphillos		George K.	Katia		George K.	George K.	Triantaphillos	Triantaphillos							George K.	Eliminated																																									
Mariposa					Costas								Chris	Panos	(Note: In Episode 26, Mariposa wasn't present at the council of the island, as she was in hospital due to illness. Also, she couldn't be voted by the players of Blue tribe.)			Walked																																											
Dimitris	Not in the Game												Panos	Mariposa	Eleftheria	Marialena	Eliminated																																												
Valeria	Not in the Game												Anna Maria	Anna Maria	Eliminated																																														
Asimina	Not in the Game				Costas				Anthi	Elizabeth	Costas	Costas	Eliminated																																																
Elizabeth	Not in the Game					Anthi	Anthi		Anthi	Pericles	Eliminated																																																		
Katia		Triantaphillos	Mike	Angeliki		Panos	Anthi		Evacuated																																																				
Angeliki		Alexis	Alexis	Triantaphillos		Eliminated																																																							
Mike		George K.	Eleftheria	Eliminated																																																									
Elena		Walked																																																											

== Matches ==
=== Team matches ===
Episode			Winner	Score	Reward
Week	No.	Air date	Winner	Score	Reward
1	1	December 27, 2020	Machites	10-6	15 litre fresh water for cooking; flour
1	2	December 28, 2020	Machites	10-3	Immunity Game; 2 Eggs for each player
1	3	December 29, 2020	Machites	10-5	Immunity Game
1	4	December 30, 2020	Diasimoi	10-9	Roof for the hut; Lighter
2	5	January 3, 2021	Machites	10-6	Two omelettes for each player
2	5	January 3, 2021	Diasimoi	7-2	Quiz Game (Fruit Salad)
2	6	January 4, 2021	Machites	10-5	Immunity Game
2	7	January 5, 2021	Diasimoi	10-7	Immunity Game
2	8	January 7, 2021	Machites	10-5	Fishing kit
3	9	January 10, 2021	Machites	10-2	Two empanadas for each player
3	9	January 10, 2021	Diasimoi	10-6	Quiz Game (5 Biscuits for each Player)
3	10	January 11, 2021	Machites	10-2	Immunity Game
3	11	January 12, 2021	Machites	10-3	Immunity Game
3	12	January 13, 2021	Machites	10-7	Communication Reward
4	13	January 17, 2021	Machites	10-6	Traditional Cheese (Talagani) & Fried Potatoes
4	14	January 18, 2021	Blue	10-4	Immunity Game
4	15	January 19, 2021	Blue	10-6	Immunity Game; Pasta
4	16	January 20, 2021	Blue	10-7	Peanut butter with bread
5	17	January 24, 2021	Blue	10-9	Pizza
5	17	January 24, 2021	Blue	7-4	Quiz Game (2 vanilla muffins for each player)
5	18	January 25, 2021	Blue	10-3	Immunity Game
5	18	January 25, 2021	George K.	—N/a	Individual Immunity Challenge
5	19	January 26, 2021	Blue	10-9	Immunity Game; Cereal bars
5	20	January 27, 2021	Blue	10-9	Communication Reward
6	21	January 31, 2021	Blue	10-4	2 pieces of Cheese Pie for each player; 2 pieces of Green Pie for each player
6	21	January 31, 2021	Blue	7-6	Quiz Game (3 mini croissants for each player)
6	22	February 1, 2021	Red	10-7	Immunity Game
6	22	February 1, 2021	Nikos	—N/a	Individual Immunity Challenge
6	23	February 2, 2021	Red	10-3	Immunity Game; Bougatsa
6	24	February 3, 2021	Blue	10-6	Communication Reward
7	25	February 7, 2021	Red	10-4	Legumes & Salad
7	25	February 7, 2021	Blue	7-5	Quiz Game (1 crepe for each player)
7	26	February 8, 2021	Red	10-6	Immunity Game
7	26	February 8, 2021	Alexis	—N/a	Individual Immunity Challenge
7	27	February 9, 2021	Red	10-8	Immunity Game; Vegan Grilled Cheese sandwiches & Salad
7	28	February 10, 2021	Blue	10-9	Communication Reward; 2 Croissants with praline filling for each player
8	29	February 14, 2021	Blue	10-7	Pizza Al Forno
8	29	February 14, 2021	Blue	7-5	Quiz Game
8	30	February 15, 2021	Red	10-3	Immunity Game
8	30	February 15, 2021	Panos	—N/a	Individual Immunity Challenge
8	31	February 16, 2021	Blue	10-8	Immunity Game; Chocolate pie & Milk pie
8	31	February 16, 2021	Koro	—N/a	Individual Immunity Challenge
8	32	February 17, 2021	Red	10-9	Communication Reward
9	33	February 21, 2021	Blue	10-6	2 jars of Tahini for each player
9	34	February 22, 2021	Blue	10-5	Immunity Game
9	34	February 22, 2021	Carolina	—N/a	Individual Immunity Challenge
9	35	February 23, 2021	Blue	10-9	Immunity Game; Protein food
9	36	February 24, 2021	Red	10-8	Communication Reward
10	37	February 28, 2021	Red	10-8	Black Angus beef
10	37	February 28, 2021	Blue	7-5	Quiz Game
10	38	March 1, 2021	Red	10-4	Immunity Game
10	38	March 1, 2021	James	—N/a	Individual Immunity Challenge
10	39	March 2, 2021	Red	10-8	Immunity Game
10	40	March 3, 2021	Blue	10-8	Communication Reward
11	41	March 7, 2021	Blue	10-3	Lunch on a yacht
11	41	March 7, 2021	Red	7-2	Quiz Game
11	42	March 8, 2021	Red	10-6	Immunity Game
11	42	March 8, 2021	Anna Maria	—N/a	Individual Immunity Challenge
11	43	March 9, 2021	Blue	10-9	Immunity Game
11	43	March 9, 2021	Koro	—N/a	Individual Immunity Challenge
11	44	March 10, 2021	Blue	10-7	Communication Reward
12	45	March 14, 2021	Blue	10-7	3 tortillas for each player
12	45	March 14, 2021	Red	5-0	Quiz Game
12	46	March 15, 2021	Blue	10-6	Immunity Game
12	46	March 15, 2021	Nicoleta	—N/a	Individual Immunity Challenge
12	47	March 16, 2021	Blue	10-9	Immunity Game
12	48	March 17, 2021	Red	10-8	Communication Reward
13	49	March 21, 2021	Blue	10-9	Breakfast
13	49	March 21, 2021	Blue	5-2	Quiz Game
13	50	March 22, 2021	Red	10-4	Immunity Game
13	50	March 22, 2021	Nikos	—N/a	Individual Immunity Challenge
13	51	March 23, 2021	Red	10-4	Immunity Game
13	52	March 24, 2021	Blue	10-6	Communication Reward
14	53	March 28, 2021		—N/a	A party was held to celebrate the merge of the tribes' beaches
14	54	March 29, 2021	Blue	10-6	Immunity Game
14	54	March 29, 2021	Pavlos	—N/a	Individual Immunity Challenge
14	55	March 30, 2021	Blue	10-7	Immunity Game
14	56	March 31, 2021	Blue	10-5	Communication Reward
15	57	April 4, 2021	Blue	10-3	Lunch
15	58	April 5, 2021	Blue	10-9	Immunity Game
15	58	April 5, 2021	Ilias	—N/a	Individual Immunity Challenge
15	59	April 6, 2021	Red	10-5	Immunity Game
15	59	April 6, 2021	Koro	—N/a	Individual Immunity Challenge
15	60	April 7, 2021	Blue	10-4	Lunch
15	60	April 7, 2021	Blue	5-4	Quiz Game
16	61	April 11, 2021	Blue	10-6	2 pieces of Chicken pie, leek pie, cheese pie & green-cheese pie for each player
16	61	April 11, 2021	Red	7-4	Quiz Game
16	62	April 12, 2021	Red	10-8	Immunity Game
16	62	April 12, 2021	Nikos	—N/a	Individual Immunity Challenge
16	63	April 13, 2021	Blue	10-5	Immunity Game
16	63	April 13, 2021	Ilias	—N/a	Individual Immunity Challenge
16	64	April 14, 2021	Blue	10-6	Communication Reward
17	65	April 18, 2021	Blue	10-9	Dinner
17	65	April 18, 2021	Red	5-2	Quiz Game
17	66	April 19, 2021	Blue	10-6	Immunity Game
17	66	April 19, 2021	Sakis	—N/a	Individual Immunity Challenge
17	67	April 20, 2021	Blue	10-6	Immunity Game
17	68	April 21, 2021	Red	10-5	Communication Reward
18	69	April 25, 2021	Red	10-7	Lunch
18	69	April 25, 2021	Red	10-7	Quiz Game
18	70	April 26, 2021	Red	10-8	Immunity Game
18	70	April 26, 2021	Pavlos	—N/a	Individual Immunity Challenge
18	71	April 27, 2021	Blue	10-9	Immunity Game
18	71	April 27, 2021	Ilias	—N/a	Individual Immunity Challenge
18	72	April 28, 2021	Blue	10-8	Communication Reward
19	73	May 3, 2021	Red	10-8	Immunity Game
19	73	May 3, 2021	Koro	—N/a	Individual Immunity Challenge
19	74	May 4, 2021	Red	10-2	Immunity Game
19	75	May 5, 2021	Blue	10-6	Communication Reward
20	76	May 9, 2021	Blue	10-9	Trip at Dolphin Park in Punta Cana; Breakfast
20	76	May 9, 2021	Blue	5-4	Quiz Game
20	77	May 10, 2021	Red	10-9	Immunity Game
20	77	May 10, 2021	Nikos	—N/a	Individual Immunity Challenge
20	78	May 11, 2021	Red	10-4	Immunity Game
20	79	May 12, 2021	Blue	10-5	Communication Reward
21	80	May 16, 2021	Ilias	—N/a	The battles for the team captains
21	80	May 16, 2021	Carolina	—N/a	The battles for the team captains
21	80	May 16, 2021	Blue	10-9	Food reward
21	81	May 17, 2021	Giorgos A.	—N/a	Immunity Game
21	82	May 18, 2021	Sakis	—N/a	Immunity Game
21	83	May 19, 2021	Red	10-7	Communication Reward
22	84	May 23, 2021	Sakis	—N/a	The battles for the team captains
22	84	May 23, 2021	Carolina	—N/a	The battles for the team captains
22	84	May 23, 2021	Red	10-9	Catamaran ride
22	85	May 24, 2021	Blue	10-5	Communication Reward
22	86	May 25, 2021	Red	10-9	Rafting & Dinner
22	87	May 26, 2021	Red	10-8	Travel to Miami
23	88	May 30, 2021	Marialena	—N/a	NBA game in Miami
23	88	May 30, 2021	Ilias	—N/a	NBA game in Miami
23	89	May 31, 2021	Carolina	—N/a	Immunity Game
23	90	June 1, 2021	Sakis	—N/a	Immunity Game
23	91	June 2, 2021	Red	10-9	Dinner in a villa with oriental dancers
24	92	June 6, 2021	Sakis	—N/a	Immunity Game
24	93	June 7, 2021	Marialena	—N/a	Immunity Game
24	94	June 8, 2021	Ilias	—N/a	Immunity Game
25	95	June 13, 2021	Blue	10-5	Game with the Turkish teams and trip to Bahamas
25	96	June 14, 2021	Sakis	—N/a	Immunity Game
25	97	June 15, 2021	Sakis	—N/a	Immunity Game
25	98	June 16, 2021	Sakis	—N/a	Immunity Game
26	99	June 20, 2021	Red	10-6	Game with the Romanian teams
26	100	June 21, 2021	Koro	—N/a	Immunity Game
26	101	June 22, 2021	Sakis	—N/a	Immunity Game
26	102	June 23, 2021	Sakis	—N/a	Immunity Game
27	103	June 27, 2021	Blue	10-6	Game with the Romanian teams

== Finals ==
Episode	Winner	Notes
106	Sakis; Ilias	Sakis and Ilias won the immunity and qualify to the semifinal.
107	Marialena; ~~G.Koromi~~	Marialena and G.Koromi who didn't win the immunity, went through the public vote to qualify to the semi-final. Marialena qualified and G.Koromi was eliminated.
107	Sakis; Iias; ~~Marialena~~	At the Semifinal the last three contestants went through public vote and the two would qualify to the grand final. Sakis and Ilias qualified and Marialena was eliminated.
108	Sakis Katsoulis	At the Final, Sakis Katsoulis was named Sole Survivor 2021. Season finale

== Ratings ==
Official ratings are taken from AGB Hellas.

Week	Episode	Air date	Timeslot (EET)	Ratings	Viewers (in millions)	Rank		Share		Source
Week	Episode	Air date	Timeslot (EET)	Ratings	Viewers (in millions)	Daily	Weekly	Household	Adults 18-54	Source
1	1	December 27, 2020	Sunday 9:00pm	17.6%	1.825	#1	#2	35.8%	34.9%	
1	2	December 28, 2020	Monday 10:15pm	13.9%	1.444	#1	#5	34.5%	32.6%	
1	3	December 29, 2020	Tuesday 10:15pm	15.5%	1.610	#1	#3	38.6%	38.5%	
1	4	December 30, 2020	Wednesday 10:15pm	15.8%	1.632	#1	#2	40.1%	40.5%	
2	5	January 3, 2021	Sunday 9:00pm	16.3%	1.688	#1	#1	33.4%	34.2%	
2	6	January 4, 2021	Monday 10:15pm	13.1%	1.353	#2	#8	30.2%	31.8%	
2	7	January 5, 2021	Tuesday 10:15pm	14.3%	1.479	#2	#6	31.8%	33.8%	
2	8 (Note: The 8th episode did not air on January 6, 2021, as Skai TV on that day broadcast breaking news about 2021 storming of the United States Capitol.)	January 7, 2021	Thursday 10:15pm	14.2%	1.475	#2	#7	36.6%	37.3%	
3	9	January 10, 2021	Sunday 9:00pm	16.1%	1.667	#1	#5	34.2%	33.9%	
3	10	January 11, 2021	Monday 10:00pm	14.0%	1.447	#2	#6	31.2%	30.8%	
3	11	January 12, 2021	Tuesday 10:00pm	13.5%	1.395	#2	#7	31.6%	31.8%	
3	12	January 13, 2021	Wednesday 10:00pm	12.6%	1.302	#2	#8	28.7%	27.8%	
4	13	January 17, 2021	Sunday 9:00pm	16.2%	1.678	#1	#5	33.7%	33.6%	
4	14	January 18, 2021	Monday 10:00pm	14.0%	1.452	#2	#7	35.8%	35.3%	
4	15	January 19, 2021	Tuesday 10:00pm	13.9%	1.440	#2	#8	34.3%	37.3%	
4	16	January 20, 2021	Wednesday 10:00pm	13.2%	1.359	#2	#9	32.2%	33.8%	
5	17	January 24, 2021	Sunday 9:00pm	16.7%	1.727	#1	#6	36.4%	33.4%	
5	18	January 25, 2021	Monday 10:00pm	12.2%	1.264	#2	#8	27.9%	29.9%	
5	19	January 26, 2021	Tuesday 10:00pm	14.1%	1.460	#2	#6	33.1%	34.1%	
5	20	January 27, 2021	Wednesday 10:00pm	13.8%	1.424	#2	#7	31.9%	33.9%	
6	21	January 31, 2021	Sunday 9:00pm	16.1%	1.665	#1	#5	35.2%	33.1%	
6	22	February 1, 2021	Monday 10:00pm	14.1%	1.464	#2	#6	33.7%	36.7%	
6	23	February 2, 2021	Tuesday 10:00pm	13.2%	1.370	#2	#7	30.6%	35.1%	
6	24	February 3, 2021	Wednesday 10:00pm	12.7%	1.317	#2	#8	30.9%	34.9%	
7	25	February 7, 2021	Sunday 9:00pm	16.1%	1.666	#1	#5	36.9%	38.5%	
7	26	February 8, 2021	Monday 10:00pm	12.1%	1.253	#2	#7	29.5%	34.4%	
7	27	February 9, 2021	Tuesday 10:00pm	12.5%	1.293	#2	#6	29.3%	32.3%	
7	28	February 10, 2021	Wednesday 10:00pm	11.7%	1.211	#2	#8	28.8%	30.7%	
8	29	February 14, 2021	Sunday 9:00pm	17.5%	1.816	#1	#2	35.6%	35.3%	
8	30	February 15, 2021	Monday 10:00pm	12.3%	1.277	#2	#10	27.1%	29.4%	
8	31	February 16, 2021	Tuesday 10:00pm	13.9%	1.443	#2	#7	31.4%	33.5%	
8	32	February 17, 2021	Wednesday 10:00pm	13.8%	1.434	#2	#8	31.2%	33.2%	
9	33	February 21, 2021	Sunday 9:00pm	18.8%	1.944	#1	#2	38.0%	38.7%	
9	34	February 22, 2021	Monday 10:00pm	12.6%	1.306	#2	#9	28.9%	32.0%	
9	35	February 23, 2021	Tuesday 10:00pm	12.6%	1.301	#2	#10	29.9%	33.1%	
9	36	February 24, 2021	Wednesday 10:00pm	13.1%	1.354	#2	#8	29.9%	36.0%	
10	37	February 28, 2021	Sunday 9:00pm	14.7%	1.524	#1	#5	30.8%	31.3%	
10	38	March 1, 2021	Monday 10:00pm	11.4%	1.185	#2	#10	27.4%	31.4%	
10	39	March 2, 2021	Tuesday 10:00pm	12.5%	1.291	#2	#7	30.8%	35.2%	
10	40	March 3, 2021	Wednesday 10:00pm	12.4%	1.284	#2	#8	29.7%	34.5%	
11	41	March 7, 2021	Sunday 9:00pm	15.1%	1.561	#1	#6	31.5%	32.0%	
11	42	March 8, 2021	Monday 10:00pm	12.8%	1.321	#2	#9	28.6%	31.4%	
11	43	March 9, 2021	Tuesday 10:00pm	13.1%	1.361	#2	#8	32.6%	39.1%	
11	44	March 10, 2021	Wednesday 10:00pm	14.3%	1.479	#2	#7	32.7%	38.5%	
12	45	March 14, 2021	Sunday 9:00pm	16.7%	1.725	#1	#2	32.8%	33.7%	
12	46	March 15, 2021	Monday 10:00pm	13.7%	1.423	#2	#9	30.8%	33.9%	
12	47	March 16, 2021	Tuesday 10:00pm	14.1%	1.463	#2	#8	31.5%	34.0%	
12	48	March 17, 2021	Wednesday 10:00pm	13.1%	1.352	#2	#11	29.1%	32.1%	
13	49	March 21, 2021	Sunday 9:00pm	16.3%	1.692	#1	#2	33.1%	33.4%	
13	50	March 22, 2021	Monday 10:00pm	12.2%	1.258	#3	#14	26.2%	29.7%	
13	51	March 23, 2021	Tuesday 10:00pm	12.8%	1.325	#3	#12	29.5%	31.5%	
13	52	March 24, 2021	Wednesday 10:00pm	14.9%	1.545	#2	#8	35.0%	37.1%	
14	53	March 28, 2021	Sunday 9:00pm	17.4%	1.802	#1	#3	38.4%	39.5%	
14	54	March 29, 2021	Monday 10:00pm	13.6%	1.413	#3	#7	29.9%	31.7%	
14	55	March 30, 2021	Tuesday 10:00pm	13.0%	1.344	#3	#12	28.9%	31.8%	
14	56	March 31, 2021	Wednesday 10:00pm	13.1%	1.356	#2	#10	27.2%	30.3%	
15	57	April 4, 2021	Sunday 9:00pm	16.6%	1.717	#1	#2	33.8%	34.2%	
15	58	April 5, 2021	Monday 10:00pm	13.4%	1.389	#2	#8	30.9%	33.7%	
15	59	April 6, 2021	Tuesday 10:00pm	12.5%	1.296	#3	#12	27.7%	29.5%	
15	60	April 7, 2021	Wednesday 10:00pm	13.5%	1.395	#2	#6	31.4%	33.3%	
16	61	April 11, 2021	Sunday 9:00pm	15.8%	1.632	#1	#3	34.4%	33.7%	
16	62	April 12, 2021	Monday 10:00pm	11.6%	1.205	#3	#13	28.3%	29.5%	
16	63	April 13, 2021	Tuesday 10:00pm	13.0%	1.350	#2	#10	31.0%	31.5%	
16	64	April 14, 2021	Wednesday 10:00pm	12.8%	1.330	#3	#11	29.9%	31.9%	
17	65	April 18, 2021	Sunday 9:00pm	15.9%	1.649	#1	#2	34.7%	32.6%	
17	66	April 19, 2021	Monday 10:00pm	13.3%	1.374	#2	#7	30.9%	33.2%	
17	67	April 20, 2021	Tuesday 10:00pm	12.7%	1.316	#3	#9	29.8%	29.1%	
17	68	April 21, 2021	Wednesday 10:00pm	12.6%	1.299	#2	#10	29.7%	31.0%	
18	69	April 25, 2021	Sunday 9:00pm	14.4%	1.493	#1	#5	31.1%	31.6%	
18	70	April 26, 2021	Monday 9:00pm	13.8%	1.427	#1	#2	29.8%	29.0%	
18	71	April 27, 2021	Tuesday 9:00pm	13.3%	1.374	#1	#3	29.1%	27.4%	
18	72	April 28, 2021	Wednesday 9:00pm	15.6%	1.610	#1	#1	34.9%	35.3%	
19	73	May 3, 2021	Monday 10:00pm	12.9%	1.337	#2	#6	32.9%	30.7%	
19	74	May 4, 2021	Tuesday 10:00pm	13.0%	1.350	#2	#5	32.0%	31.8%	
19	75	May 5, 2021	Wednesday 10:00pm	12.2%	1.258	#2	#8	29.2%	28.2%	
20	76	May 9, 2021	Sunday 9:00pm	12.6%	1.307	#1	#7	28.1%	29%	
20	77	May 10, 2021	Monday 10:00pm	11.9%	1.232	#2	#6	31.5%	33.8%	
20	78	May 11, 2021	Tuesday 10:00pm	11.5%	1.189	#2	#9	29.3%	29.6%	
20	79	May 12, 2021	Wednesday 10:00pm	10.7%	1.104	#2	#10	29.3%	29.6%	
21	80	May 16, 2021	Sunday 09:00pm	13.3%	1.379	#1	#5	31.6%	27.8%	
21	81	May 17, 2021	Monday 10:00pm	10.8%	1.114	#2	#8	28.6%	26.3%	
21	82	May 18, 2021	Tuesday 10:00pm	10.7%	1.112	#2	#9	27.7%	26.7%	
21	83	May 19, 2021	Wednesday 10:00 pm	9.6%	997	#2	#10	25.3%	25.1%	
22	84	May 23, 2021	Sunday 09:00pm	12.9%	1.333	#1	#6	32.0%	28.7%	
22	85	May 24, 2021	Monday 10:00pm	8.8%	913	#3	#13	23.5%	21.2%	
22	86	May 25, 2021	Tuesday 10:00pm	10.6%	1.095	#2	#7	27.7%	27.5%	
22	87	May 26, 2021	Wednesday 10:00 pm	9.4%	970	#2	#10	24.1%	21.9%	
23	88	May 30, 2021	Sunday 09:00pm	12.8%	1.320	#1	#5	30.5%	27.6%	
23	89	May 31, 2021	Monday 10:00pm	10.2%	1.061	#3	#9	27.5%	27.4%	
23	90	June 1, 2021	Tuesday 10:00pm	9.9%	1.028	#3	#10	25.6%	27.4%	
23	91	June 2, 2021	Wednesday 10:00 pm	9.8%	1.014	#3	#11	25.7%	23.7%	
24	92	June 6, 2021	Sunday 09:00pm	13.2%	1.371	#1	#5	33.3%	31.2%	
24	93	June 7, 2021	Monday 10:00pm	11.8%	1.224	#1	#5	31.2%	31.7%	
24	94	June 8, 2021	Tuesday 10:00pm	10.2%	1.055	#2	#8	26.6%	24.4%	
25	95	June 13, 2021	Sunday 09:00pm	12.2%	1.264	#2	#3	30.6%	25.5%	
25	96	June 14, 2021	Monday 10:00pm	11.2%	1.164	#1	#4	31%	27.6%	
25	97	June 15, 2021	Tuesday 10:00pm	11.1%	1.150	#2	#5	30.1%	25.6%	
25	98	June 16, 2021	Wednesday 10:00 pm	10.8%	1.116	#1	#6	30.8%	26.5%	
26	99	June 20, 2021	Sunday 09:00pm	10.1%	1.044	#1	#7	31.1%	24.0%	
26	100	June 21, 2021	Monday 10:00pm	10.7%	1.108	#1	#2	32.4%	28.4%	
26	101	June 22, 2021	Tuesday 10:00pm	10.4%	1.077	#1	#3	31.2%	26.7%	
26	102	June 23, 2021	Wednesday 10:00 pm	10.2%	1.055	#1	#4	30.5%	27.4%	
27	103	June 27, 2021	Sunday 09:00pm	10.2%	1.054	#2	#5	30.1%	26.0%	
27	104	June 28, 2021	Monday 10:00pm	9.0%	0.928	#2	#13	26.4%	20.4%	
27	105	June 29, 2021	Tuesday 10:00pm	10.0%	1.030	#1	#9	29.9%	25.6%	
27	106	June 30, 2021	Wednesday 10:00pm	8.9%	0.926	#1	#14	29.4%	24.4%	
28	107	July 4, 2021	Sunday 09:00pm	10.9%	1.126	#1	#6	33.4%	30.7%	
28	108	July 5, 2021	Monday 09:00pm	13.2%	1.362	#1	#10	40.8%	38.9%	
