= Survivor Greece =

- Genre: Reality
- Created by: Charlie Parsons
- Presented by: Grigoris Arnaoutoglou; Konstantinos Markoulakis; Giannis Aivazis; Sakis Tanimanidis; Giorgos Lianos
- Country of origin: Greece
- Original language: Greek
- No. of seasons: 13
- No. of episodes: 1050

Original release
- Network: Mega TV
- Release: 18 September 2003 – 2 June 2010
- Network: Skai TV
- Release: 13 February 2017 – present

Related
- Expedition Robinson; Survivor (American TV series)

Survivor Greece is the Greek version of the reality show Survivor.

This version of the show was aired on Mega TV for two seasons from 2003 to 2004. While the series was titled Survivor, it also took elements from Survivor's predecessor Expedition Robinson, such as that of the North and South teams. The series did not achieve the ratings that Mega TV had hoped for, and it was cancelled at the end of its second season. It was brought back two years later, for a joint season with Turkey. After seven years, on 13 February 2017, the show came back on Skai TV, with Sakis Tanimanidis as host. The following year, Giorgos Lianos joined the show as a co-host. In 2020, Tanimanidis left the programme, and Lianos became the main host.

== Format and rules ==
For the Mega TV editions (seasons 1–4) Greek Survivor followed the format of the American Survivor, with added twists such as Redemption Island (where voted out players could return). The show produced more episodes than the American version, usually splitting a week's episodes between the reward and the immunity challenges, but the main format remained close to the original CBS one.

In the event of a tie at Tribal Councils, contestants competed in a duel in order to determine who would be eliminated. Additionally, when a player was forced out of the game due to sickness, he/she couldn't be a member of jury. As seen in season two, if jury members did not wish to cast a vote for a winner they were not required to.

After Skai TV picked up the production rights in a collaboration with producer Acun Ilıcalı, the format of the game completely changed. Challenges pitted people in 1v1 (or sometimes 2v2 or 3v3) situations, with the winner gifting their team a point. Teams that reached 10 points first won the challenge (like a volleyball match).

Another major change was the introduction of fan voting. The tribe who lost Immunity Challenge had to select two or three players to be in the Elimination Vote. The fans, through calls and texts, then chose the Survivor who should leave the game. This change required the game to be broadcast with minimal delay (usually 2 days) in order for the fans to vote in time. Fans voting was the deciding factor in the Semi Final and Final too, with no jury in place.

The general success of the show, pushed the production team to extend the duration of the game, usually by introducing new players in later stages. This tactic pushed Season 6 to drag for 177 days, which many considered it made it stale.

== Series overview ==
List of Greek Survivor seasons
Season	Premiere date	Finale date	Network	Location	Episodes	Days	Castaways	Initial tribes	Winner	Runner-up	Grand Prize	Host(s)
1	September 18, 2003	December 28, 2003	Mega TV	Malaysia, Southeast Asia	29	42	17	Two tribes of eight	Evangelia Dermetzoglou	Nikos Labrinakis	€200,000	Grigoris Arnaoutoglou
2	September 26, 2004	December 28, 2004	Mega TV	Malaysia, Southeast Asia	42	42	20	Two tribes of ten	Konstantinos Hristodoulakis	Anna Mazour	€200,000	Grigoris Arnaoutoglou
Greece vs. Turkey	September 23, 2006	December 28, 2006	Mega TV	Pearl Islands, Panama	27	53+	20	Two tribes of ten	Derya Durmuşlar	Amfikratis Zachariadis	€250,000	Konstantinos Markoulakis
Patagonia	February 15, 2010	June 2, 2010	Mega TV	Patagonia, South America	20	—N/a	18	Two tribes of nine	Vangelis Gerasimou	Kleanthis Koktsidis	€150,000	Giannis Aivazis
5	February 13, 2017	July 5, 2017	Skai TV	Las Terrenas, Samaná, Dominican Republic	90	148	25	Two tribes of twelve	Giorgos Aggelopoulos	Marios Priamos-Ioannidis	€100,000	Sakis Tanimanidis
6	January 21, 2018	July 13, 2018	Skai TV	Las Terrenas, Samaná, Dominican Republic	117	177	32	Two tribes of twelve	Ilias Gotsis	Katerina Dalaka	€100,000	Sakis Tanimanidis; Giorgos Lianos
Greece vs. Turkey	February 2, 2019	June 30, 2019	Skai TV	La Romana, Dominican Republic	119	149	33	Two tribes of twelve	Katerina Dalaka	Dimitra Vamvakousi	€100,000	Sakis Tanimanidis; Giorgos Lianos
8	December 27, 2020	July 5, 2021	Skai TV	La Romana, Dominican Republic	108	198	34	Two tribes of ten	Sakis Katsoulis	Ilias Bogdanos	€100,000	Giorgos Lianos
9	December 26, 2021	July 6, 2022	Skai TV	La Romana, Dominican Republic	134	198	39	Two tribes of twelve	Stathis Schizas	Aris Soiledis	€100,000	Giorgos Lianos
All-Star	January 8, 2023	July 11, 2023	Skai TV	La Romana, Dominican Republic	118	184	38	Two tribes of thirteen	Sakis Katsoulis	Nikos Bartzis	€100,000	Giorgos Lianos
11	January 7, 2024	June 26, 2024	Skai TV	La Romana, Dominican Republic	116	174	36	Two tribes of ten	Daniel Nurka	Fanis Boletsis; Katerina Dalaka	€100,000	Giorgos Lianos
12	September 16, 2024	December 12, 2024	Skai TV	La Romana, Dominican Republic	61	92	25	Two tribes of nine	Nino Nikolaidis	Giannis Alkeo Keli	€100,000	Giorgos Lianos
13	January 11, 2026	May 20, 2026	Skai TV	La Romana, Dominican Republic	68	130	37	Two tribes of twelve	Stavros Floros (Note: The 13th season was permanently halted in May 2026, following a serious accident involving player Stavros Floros. The player was injured by a boat propellers while spearfishing, which led to the amputation of his left leg and the immediate cessation of the show by the network. Following the suspension, the prize money and title of "Sole Survivor" was awarded to Stavros Floros)	None	€250,000	Giorgos Lianos

== Greek Survivor season ==
=== Season One ===
- Date: 18 September 2003 – 28 December 2003 (29 episodes).
- Location: Malaysia, Southeast Asia.
- Hosted: Grigoris Arnaoutoglou

Survivor 1, was the first edition of the Greek version of the popular reality show Survivor and it aired from September 2003 to December 2003, every Thursday and Sunday night.

The winner of season one was Evangelia Dermetzoglou.

List of Survivor season 1 contestants
Contestant	Original Tribes	Episode Cycle 2 Tribes	Unification of the Islands	Finish
Rena Dimitriou; 40, Xanthi	South Team			Expelled; Day 2
Sandra Boura; 60, Nafplio	North Team			1st Voted Out; Day 4
Giannis Veronis; 60, Mykonos	South Team			2nd Voted Out; Day 9
Theodoros Sfantos; 46, Crete	South Team			3rd Voted Out; Day 13
Dimitris Katranis; 33, Athens	North Team			4th Voted Out; Day 17
Tzeni Katsarou; 24, Athens	South Team			5th Voted Out; Day 21
Konstantinos Sotiriou; 32, Athens	North Team			6th Voted Out; Day 24
Efimia Fakatseli; 29, Athens	North Team		Unification of the Islands	7th Voted Out; 1st Jury Member; Day 28
Maria Solonaki; 24, Thessaloniki	South Team		Unification of the Islands	8th Voted Out; 2nd Jury Member; Day 31
Katerina Darmi; 24, Athens	South Team		Unification of the Islands	Left Competition; 3rd Jury Member; Day 34
Andreas Nasioudis; 25, Thessaloniki	South Team		Unification of the Islands	9th Voted Out; 4th Jury Member; Day 34
Ilias Valasis; 32, Syros	North Team	South Team	Unification of the Islands	10th Voted Out; 5th Jury Member
Spyros Soulis; 28, Athens	North Team		Unification of the Islands	11th Voted Out; 6th Jury Member
Despina Siakou; 40, Athens	South Team		Unification of the Islands	12th Voted Out; 7th Jury Member
Orthoula Papadakou; 33, Athens	North Team		Unification of the Islands	Lost Challenge; 8th Jury Member
Nikos Lamprinakis; 47, Crete	South Team	North Team	Unification of the Islands	Runner-Up
Evangelia Dermetzoglou; 31, Athens	North Team		Unification of the Islands	Sole Survivor

=== Season Two ===
- Date: September 26, 2004 – December 28, 2004 (42 episodes).
- Location: Malaysia, Southeast Asia.
- Hosted: Grigoris Arnaoutoglou.

Survivor 2, was the second edition of the Greek version of the popular reality show Survivor and it aired from September 2004 to December 2004, every Friday, Saturday and Sunday night

The winner of season two was Konstantinos Hristodoulakis.

List of Survivor season 2 contestants
Contestant	Original Tribes	Episode Cycle 3 Tribes	Episode Cycle 5 Tribes	Merged Tribe	Finish
Eleni Karadimou; 32, Athens	Women				Evacuated
Maria Velli; 24, Athens	Women				Left Competition
Vicky Sapouna; 26, Alexandria	Women				1st Voted Out; Lost Duel
Athanasia Markoudi; 24, Thessaloniki	Women				2nd Voted Out; Lost Duel
Michalis Apazoglou; 21, Athens	Men	North Team			3rd Voted Out; Lost Duel
Mara Kopanou; 34, Athens	Women	South Team			Left Competition
Vasilis Boutsoris; 46, Athens	Men	North Team			4th Voted Out; Lost Duel
Gerasimos Pylarinos; 25, Corinth	Men	South Team			5th Voted Out; Evacuated at Duel
Pavlos Papadakis; 26, Chania	Men	South Team			6th Voted Out; Lost Duel
Giannis Tsiolis; 21, Athens	Men	North Team			Lost Challenge
Konstantina Golia; 24, Athens	Women	South Team			7th Voted Out; Lost Duel; Voted back in 4th Jury Member
Giorgos Papasotiriou; 36, Athens	Men	South Team		Unification of the Islands	9th Voted Out; Lost Duel; 1st Jury Member
Melina Patakiouta; 26, Athens	Women	North Team		Unification of the Islands	Evacuated
Katerina Vasilopoulou; 24, Athens	Women	South Team		Unification of the Islands	10th Voted Out; Refused Duel; 2nd Jury Member
Paola Voutos; 25, Athens	Women	North Team	South Team	Unification of the Islands	11th Voted Out; Refused Duel; 3rd Jury Member
Nikos Soures; 31, Chalcis	Men	South Team	North Team	Unification of the Islands	8th Voted Out; Lost Duel; 5th Jury Member
Manolis Bouzakis; 46, Chania	Men	South Team		Unification of the Islands	Won Final Duel; Lost Challenge; 6th Jury Member
Giorgos Synetos; 29, Athens	Men	North Team		Unification of the Islands	Lost Challenge; 7th Jury Member
Anna Mazour; 32, Athens	Women	North Team		Unification of the Islands	Runner-Up
Konstantinos Christodoulakis; 42, Athens	Men	North Team		Unification of the Islands	Sole Survivor

=== Season Three ===
- Date: September 23, 2006 – December 28, 2006 (27 episodes).
- Location: Pearl Islands, Panama (Final: Buenos Aires, Argentina).
- Hosted: Konstantinos Markoulakis.

Survivor 3 or Greece vs. Turkey was the third season of the Survivor to air in Greece and the second season to air in Turkey.

This season premiered on Saturday, September 23, 2006, and it aired from September 2006 to December of that same year, every Tuesday and Thursday night. This was the first time that either country's branch of the franchise competed with another country and because of this, the major twist this season was that the tribes were divided up by country of origin.

The winner of season three was Derya Durmuşlar.

List of Survivor: Greece vs. Turkey contestants
Contestant	Tribe	Finish
Vasilis Athanasopoulos; 24, Anavyssos	Greece	Left Competition; Day 2
Maria Nikoloutsou; 21, Ioannina	Greece	1st Voted Out; Day 3
Fulya Gürkan; 25, Istanbul	Turkey	2nd Voted Out; Day 7
Onur Alper Sarmusak; 23, Istanbul	Turkey	3rd Voted Out; Day 10
Ioanna Nikolaou; 26, Messolonghi	Greece	4th Voted Out; Day 16
Çiğdem Mısırlı; 24, Malatya	Turkey	5th Voted Out; Day 21
Stella Kalenderoglou; 36, Athens	Greece	6th Voted out Day 23
Melita Gouait; 30, Nea Makri	Greece	7th Voted Out; Day 25
Giannis Zisis; 31, Chalcis	Greece	8th Voted Out; Day 30
Teymuralp Merter Fosforoğlu; 36, Ankara	Turkey	9th Voted Out; Day 34
Arzu Gazioğlu; 18, Istanbul	Turkey	10th Voted Out; Day 40
Metin Gülgez; 35, Ankara	Turkey	11th Voted Out; Day 44
Nadia Zagli; 22, Athens	Greece	Team Duel; Day 45
İpek Esin; 36, Istanbul	Turkey	Team Duel; Day 45
Pantelis Papakonstantinou; 39, Thessaloniki	Greece	12th Voted Out; Day 48
Selim Sabah; 25, Istanbul	Turkey	13th Voted Out; Day 53
Aytuğ Yüksel; 22, Ankara	Turkey	Turkish Semi-final
Platonas Lemonopoulos; 29, Katerini	Greece	Greek Semi-final
Amfikratis Zachariadis; 31, Thessaloniki	Greece	Runner-Up
Derya Durmuşlar; 45, Istanbul	Turkey	Sole Survivor

=== Season Four ===
- Date: February 15, 2010 – June 2, 2010 (20 episodes).
- Location: Patagonia, South America.
- Hosted: Giannis Aivazis

Survivor: Patagonia or Patagonia: The Edge of the World was the fourth season of the Survivor to air in Greece. This season premiered on Monday, February 15, 2010, and it aired from February 2010 to June of that same year, every Sunday night.

The winner of season four was Vangelis Gerasimou.

List of Survivor: Patagonia contestants
Contestant	Tribe	Finish
Giannis Karaouzas; 37, Zografou; Unemployed	Alepoudes	1st Elimination
Nikos Nikolaou; 40, Athens; Businessman	Kondores	2nd Elimination
Natalia Andreadi; 27, Athens; English Teacher	Alepoudes	3rd Elimination
Tzeni Arfani; 29, English Teacher	Alepoudes	4th Elimination
Ioanna Gerodimitriou; 35, Avia; Gymnast	Alepoudes	5th Elimination
Sossana Manousaridou; 30, Thessaloniki; Private Employee	Kondores	6th Elimination
Chara Katsaouni; 32, Chalcis; Real estate agent	Alepoudes	7th Elimination
Nadia Asimakopoulou; 26, Athens; Nurse	Kondores	8th Elimination (Walked)
Dionysia Bompoli; 28, Physical Therapist	Kondores	9th Elimination (due to injury)
Nikol Rafa; 33, Athens; Molecular Biologist	Kondores	10th Elimination (Walked)
Giorgos Gidakos; 27, Sparta; Electrical engineer	Alepoudes	11th Elimination
Vangelis Kavalaris; 38, Athens; Businessman	Kondores	12th Elimination
Eirini Mavraki; 26, Veterinarian	Kondores	13th Elimination
Giannis Laitsos; 27, Grevena; Teacher of Informatics	Kondores	14th Elimination
Nikolas Dagalakis; 24, Crete; Τrainer	Kondores	15th Elimination
Kostas Manioudakis; 36, Crete; Accountant	Alepoudes	Runner-Up
Kleanthis Koktsidis; 25, Athens; Student Undergraduate	Alepoudes	Runner-Up
Vangelis Gerasimou; 29, Kalamata; Cook	Alepoudes	Winner

=== Season Five ===
- Date: February 13, 2017 – July 5, 2017 (90 episodes).
- Location: Las Terrenas, Samaná, Dominican Republic.
- Hosted: Sakis Tanimanidis (From the island). Eleonora Meleti (Survivor Panorama - From Greece).

Survivor 2017 was the fifth season of the Survivor to air in Greece from Skai TV and in Cyprus from Sigma TV. Premiered on February 13, 2017, and the final was on July 5, 2017, with the host Sakis Tanimanidis. It aired 4 nights a week, from Sunday to Wednesday (for some time it also aired on Thursdays)

Twelve players and twelve celebrities have been known in Greece through their work are invited to survive on a deserted island, the exotic Dominican Republic, for 5 months, having their luggage, the necessary clothes and basic food supply.

The winner of season five was Giorgos 'Danos' Angelopoulos.

List of Survivor Greece 2017 contestants
Contestants	Original Team	Second Team	Finish
Dimitris Paschoulas; 24, Naousa	Volunteers		Walked; Episode 4
Marianna Kalergi; 24, Athens	Celebrities		1st Voted Out; Episode 4
Eirini Ainatzioglou; 23, Athens	Volunteers		2nd Voted Out; Episode 8
Elisavet Dovliatidou; 24, Thessaloniki	Volunteers		3rd Voted Out; Episode 12
Gouili Kalvourtzis; 35, Thessaloniki	Volunteers		4th Voted Out; Episode 16
Eleni Darra; 32, Patras	Volunteers		5th Voted Out; Episode 21
Sofi Paschali; 41, Athens	Celebrities		6th Voted Out; Episode 26
Eirini Kolida; 34, Athens	Volunteers		Evacuated; Episode 31
Panos Argianidis; 35, Athens	Volunteers		7th Voted Out; Episode 36
Stelios Chantampakis; 31, Athens	Celebrities		8th Voted Out; Episode 39
Eirini Papadopoulou; 31, Athens	Celebrities		Walked; Episode 40
Lampros Choutos; 37, Athens	Celebrities		9th Voted Out; Episode 42
Orestis Chang; 27, Thessaloniki	Volunteers		10th Voted Out; Episode 50
Laura Narges; 26, Athens	Celebrities		11th Voted Out; Episode 54
Elisavet Ainatzioglou; 23, Athens	Volunteers		12th Voted Out; Episode 58
Kostas Kokkinakis; 41, Athens	Celebrities		13th Voted Out; Episode 68
Charalampos Xenidis (Bo); 43, Athens	Celebrities		14th Voted Out; Episode 72
Giorgos Chraniotis; 43, Athens	Celebrities		15th Voted Out; Episode 76
Sara Eskenazy; 29, Athens	Volunteers		16th Voted Out; Episode 80
Evrydiki Valavani; 29, Athens	Celebrities		17th Voted Out; Episode 82
Giannis Spaliaras; 41, Athens	Celebrities	Volunteers	18th Voted Out; Episode 85
Kostas Anagnostopoulos; 32, Athens	Volunteers		Quarter-Final; Episode 86
Konstantinos Vasalos; 27, Athens	Volunteers		Semi-Final; Episode 87
Marios Priamos Ioannidis; 30, Cyprus	Volunteers		Runner Up; Episode 90
Giorgos Angelopoulos; 35, Skiathos	Volunteers	Celebrities	Sole Survivor; Episode 90

=== Season Six ===
- Date: January 21, 2018 – July 13, 2018 (117 episodes).
- Location: Las Terrenas, Samaná, Dominican Republic.
- Hosted: Sakis Tanimanidis and Giorgos Lianos (From the island). Doretta Papadimitriou (Survivor Panorama or Edo Survivor - From Greece).

Survivor 2018 was the sixth season to air in Greece from Skai TV and in Cyprus from Sigma TV. This series premiered on January 21, 2018, with Sakis Tanimanidis as the host. It aired 4 nights a week, from Sunday to Wednesday (for some time it also aired on Thursdays)

Twelve players; and twelve celebrities; have been known in Greece through their work are invited to survive on a deserted island, the exotic Dominican Republic, for 6 months, having their luggage, the necessary clothes and basic food supply. More players joined the game later.

Winner of season six was Ilias Gotsis.

List of Survivor Greece 2018 contestants
Contestant	Original tribe	Second tribe	Merged tribe	Final Symbols	Finish
Alexandros Parthenis; 43, Actor, Model	Diasimoi			0	1st Voted Out; Episode 4
Angeliki Kokalitsa; 26, Trikala, Kick Boxer	Machites			0	2nd Voted Out; Episode 8
Katerina Chalikia; 39, Kaisariani, Basketball Player	Diasimoi			0	3rd Voted Out; Episode 12
Marina Pichou; 25, Trikala, Gymnast	Machites			0	4th Voted Out; Episode 16
Nikos Thomas; 43, Piraeus, Cinematographer	Machites			0	5th Voted Out; Episode 20
Zoi Andronikidou; 20, Thessaloniki, Taekwondo Athlete	Machites			0	Walked; Episode 24
Eleni Chatzidou; 37, Thessaloniki, Singer	Diasimoi			0	6th Voted Out; Episode 25
Maria Samarinou; 22, Thessaloniki, Skier	Diasimoi			0	Walked; Episode 29
Xenia - Rec; 28, Singer	Diasimoi			0	7th Voted Out; Episode 30
Giannis Drymonakos; 33, European Swimming Champion	Diasimoi			0	8th Voted Out; Episode 35
Konstantina Spyropoulou; 29, Rhodes, TV Presenter	Diasimoi			0	9th Voted Out; Episode 40
Evi Skaroni; 27, Athens, Personal Trainer	Diasimoi			0	10th Voted Out; Episode 45
Thodoris Theodoropoulos; 37, Athens, Model	Machites			0	Evacuated; Episode 47
Maria Pantazi; Melissia, Kickboxer World Champion	Machites			0	11th Voted Out; Episode 48
Olga Farmaki; 32, Fashion blogger, Βusinessman	Diasimoi			0	Walked; Episode 52
Felisia Tsalapati; Athens, Journalist	Machites			0	12th Voted Out; Episode 56
Stelios Kritikos; 44, Rhodes, Actor	Diasimoi			0	13th Voted Out; Episode 66
Sozon Palaistros Charos; 39, Lemnos, Field hockey coach	Diasimoi			0	14th Voted Out; Episode 71
Konstantinos Tsepanis; 32, Koukaki, Wrestling Champion, Plumber	Machites	Diasimoi		0	15th Voted Out; Episode 76
Daria Turovnik; 20, Cyprus, Model	Machites	Machites		1	16th Voted Out; Episode 81
Nasos Papargyropoulos; 32, Βusinessman, Actor	Diasimoi	Machites		2	17th Voted Out; Episode 86
Michalis Mouroutsos; 37, Athens, Olympic Taekwondo Champion	Diasimoi	Diasimoi		0	18th Voted Out; Episode 91
Rodanthi Kaparou Kaparaki; 19, Heraklion, P.E.Student	Machites	Machites		0	19th Voted Out; Episode 96
Evi Saltaferidou; 28, Thessaloniki, Gymnast	Diasimoi	Machites		3	20th Voted Out; Episode 101
Giannis Tsilis; 31, Ioannina, Rowing Athlete	Diasimoi	Diasimoi	Merged Tribe	3	21st Voted Out; Episode 106
Panos Theodorou; 36, Volos, P.E. Teacher, Sports Programs Creator	Machites	Machites	Merged Tribe	1	22nd Voted Out; Episode 109
Nikolas Agorou; 26, Athens, Μeter Focus Center	Machites	Machites	Merged Tribe	3	23rd Voted Out; Episode 111
Charis Giakoumatos; 36, Chalandri, Βusinessman	Machites	Diasimoi	Merged Tribe	1	24th Voted Out; Episode 113
Virginia Dikaioulia; 22, Mytilene, Volleyball Player	Machites	Diasimoi	Merged Tribe	2	Quarter-Final; Episode 115
Melina Metaxa; 31, Limassol, Zakynthos, Breakdancer	Machites	Diasimoi	Merged Tribe	0	Semi-Final; Episode 116
Katerina Dalaka; 25, Katerini, Athlete	Diasimoi	Diasimoi	Merged Tribe	5	Runner-Up; Episode 117
Ilias Gotsis; 28, Athens, Personal Trainer	Machites	Machites	Merged Tribe	1	Sole Survivor; Episode 117

=== Season Seven ===
- Date: February 2, 2019 – June 30, 2019 (118 episodes).
- Location: La Romana, Dominican Republic.
- Hosted:
  - Greece: Sakis Tanimanidis and Giorgos Lianos (From the island). Bagia Antonopoulou (Survivor Panorama - From Greece).
  - Turkey: Acun Ilicali and Murat Ceylan.

Survivor 7 or Greece vs. Turkey is the seventh season of Survivor airing in Greece and the thirteenth season airing in Turkey. It aired 5 nights a week, from Saturday to Wednesday (for some time it also aired on Thursdays)

The Greek winner was Katerina Dalaka.

The Turkish winner was Yusuf Karakaya.

List of Survivor Greece vs. Turkey 2019 contestants
Contestant	Original tribe	Switched tribe	Final Symbols	Finish
Dimitris Margaritis; 45, Athens, Jailer	Greece		0	Evacuated; Episode 3
Dimitra (Demi) Tsaganou; 27, Lamia, Referee	Greece		0	1st Voted Out; Episode 4
Erdem Ekşioğlu; 25, Istanbul	Turkey		0	Walked; Episode 7
Nadia Mavroudea; 27, Athens, Personal Trainer	Greece		0	Walked; Episode 8
Kader Karakaya; 22, Osmangazi, Football Player and Coach	Turkey		0	2nd Voted Out; Episode 9
Ioulieta Kitrinou; 26, Chios, Model, Actor	Greece		0	3rd Voted Out; Episode 14
Azim Kaan Güvenilir; 29, Istanbul, DJ/Artist	Turkey		0	4th Voted Out; Episode 19
Ecem Onaran; 29, İzmir, Athlete	Turkey		1	5th Voted Out; Episode 24
Vasilis Simos; 27, Athens, Fishmonger	Greece		0	6th Voted Out; Episode 29
Hakan Kanık; 19, Istanbul, Chef	Turkey		3	7th Voted Out; Episode 34
Patrick Ogunsoto; 35, Lagos, Former Football Player	Greece		0	8th Voted Out; Episode 39
Vasilis Vasilikos; 28, Athens, Businessman	Greece		1	9th Voted Out; Episode 44
Melisa Emirbayer; 23, İzmir, Swimmer	Turkey	Black	2	10th Voted Out; Episode 50
Tony Stavratis; 34, Salamina, Football player	Greece	White	0	11th Voted Out; Episode 56
Elpida Meziridou; 28, Cyprus, Personal Trainer	Greece	Black	0	12th Voted Out; Episode 66
Sabriye Şengül; 30, Şalpazarı, Kickboxing	Turkey	White	1	13th Voted Out; Episode 72
Atakan Işıktutan; 24, Istanbul, Journalist	Turkey	Black	1	14th Voted Out; Episode 78
Ria Kolovou; 30, Edessa, Gymnastics Academy	Greece	White	3	15th Voted Out; Episode 84
Hikmet Tuğsuz; 32, Antalya, Personal Trainer	Turkey	White	2	Evacuated; Episode 88
Büşra Yalçın; 21, Istanbul, Volleyball Player and Coach	Turkey	White	5	16th Voted Out; Episode 96
Spyros Gourdoupis; 28, Patras, Structural Biologist, Rapper	Greece	Black	3	17th Voted Out; Episode 104
Kyriakos Pelekanos; 39, Nicosia, Cyprus, Personal Trainer	Greece	White	1	18th Voted Out; Episode 108
Sude Burcu; 22, İzmir, Taekwondo	Turkey	Black	3	19th Voted Out; Episode 110
Panagiotis Konstantinidis; 24, Athens, Nutritionist, Training	Greece	Black	2	20th Voted Out; Episode 113
Bora Edin; 34, Istanbul, Personal Trainer	Turkey	White	1	21st Voted Out; Episode 116
Emre Durak; 22, Adana, University student	Turkey	Black	4	Turkish; 4th Place; Episode 118
Afroditi Skafida; 36, Athens, Trainer	Greece	White	2	Greek; 4th Place; Episode 118
Okay Köksal; 31, Artvin, Taekwondo	Turkey	White	3	Turkish; 3rd Place; Episode 118
Nikos Kosmas; 25, Athens, Karate	Greece	White	3	Greek; 3rd Place; Episode 118
Dimitra Vamvakousi; 23, Athens, Model, P.E. Teacher	Greece	Black	3	Greek; Runner-up; Episode 118
Katerina Dalaka; 26, Katerini, Athlete	Greece	Black	2	Greek; Sole Survivor; Episode 118
Seda Ocak; 34, Bursa, Athlete	Turkey	White	6	Turkish; Runner-up; Episode 119
Yusuf Karakaya; 24, Elazığ, Kickboxing	Turkey	Black	4	Turkish; Sole Survivor; Episode 119

=== Season Eight ===
- Date: December 27, 2020 - July 5, 2021 (108 episodes).
- Location: La Romana, Dominican Republic.
- Hosted: Giorgos Lianos

Survivor 8 was the eighth season of Survivor airing in Greece. It aired 4 nights a week, from Sunday to Wednesday. It was the first season that Giorgos Lianos was the main host.

The winner was Sakis Katsoulis

List of Survivor Greece season 8 contestants
Contestant	Original tribe	Switched tribe	New tribe	Merged tribe	Statistics	Finish
Elena Liliopoulou; 24, Kallithea, Baker	Machites				50%	Walked; Episode 2
Mike Arnaoutis; 41, Athens, Boxer	Diasimoi				38%	1st Voted Out; Episode 4
Angeliki Lampri; 45, Ioannina, Actress	Diasimoi				23%	2nd Voted Out; Episode 8
Katia Tarabanko; 24, Mariupol, Model	Diasimoi				65%	Evacuated; Episode 13
Elizabeth Elechi; 37, Athens, TV Reporter	Diasimoi	Red			52%	3rd Voted Out; Episode 16
Asimina Igglezou; 41, Athens, Mountain Jogging Athlete	Machites	Red			35%	4th Voted Out; Episode 20
Valeria Chopsonidou; 32, Thessaloniki, Sportswear Designer		Blue			29%	5th Voted Out; Episode 24
Dimitris Makropoulos; 30, Athens, Agronomist		Blue			29%	6th Voted Out; Episode 28
Elena Mariposa Kremlidou; 24, Thessaloniki, Instagrammer	Machites	Blue			60%	Walked; Episode 30
Pericles Kondylatos; 41, Athens, Jewelry Designer	Diasimoi	Red			35%	7th Voted Out; Episode 32
Anthi Salagoudi; 36, Thessaloniki, Journalist, Presenter	Diasimoi	Red			17%	8th Voted Out; Episode 36
Sofia Margariti; 41, Trikala, Car Mechanic	Machites	Red			60%	Evacuated; Episode 40
Chris Stamoulis; 31, Thessaloniki, Lawyer	Machites	Blue			48%	9th Voted Out; Episode 40
George Tavladakis; 37, Crete, Public Relations		Blue			53%	10th Voted Out; Episode 44
Panos Kalidis; 43, Drama, Singer	Diasimoi	Blue			22%	Walked; Episode 45
George Kopsidas; 45, Athens, Actor	Diasimoi	Red			57%	11th Voted Out; Episode 48
Anna Maria Velli; 30, Athens, YouTuber, Actress	Diasimoi	Blue			55%	12th Voted Out; Episode 52
Marianthi Kasdagli; 29, Thessaloniki, Merchant Navy Lieutenant		Red			49%	13th Voted Out; Episode 56
Christina Kefala; 28, Athens, Model		Blue	Blue		39%	14th Voted Out; Episode 60
Eleftheria Eleftheriou; 31, Paralimni, Singer	Diasimoi	Blue	Red		31%	15th Voted Out; Episode 64
Alexis Pappas; 34, Actor	Diasimoi	Blue	Red		47%	16th Voted Out; Episode 68
Costas Papadopoulos; 36, Russia, Pastry Chef	Machites	Red	Blue		47%	17th Voted Out; Episode 72
Pavlos Galakteros; 23, Thessaloniki, Audio & Light Expert		Red	Blue		46%	18th Voted Out; Episode 75
James Kafetzis; 24, Rhodes, Boat Party Organizer	Machites	Blue	Blue		64%	Walked; Episode 78
Nikos Bartzis; 26, Corinth, Farmer	Machites	Blue	Blue		50%	Evacuated; Episode 80
Nikoleta Mavridi; 26, Athens, Dancer		Red	Red	Merged Tribe	42%	19th Voted Out; Episode 83
Triantaphillos Chatzinicolaou; 43, Rhodes, Singer	Diasimoi	Red	Red	Merged Tribe	25%	20th Voted Out; Episode 91
Carolina Jacqueline Kalyva; 31, Toronto, Pilates Instructor		Red	Red	Merged Tribe	55%	21st Voted Out; Episode 95
Eleni Haberi; 26, Volos, Personal Trainer		Red	Blue	Merged Tribe	49%	22nd Voted Out; Episode 99
George Asimakopoulos; 29, Patras, Fashion Designer	Machites	Red	Red	Merged Tribe	43%	23rd Voted Out; Episode 103
George "Koro" Koromi; 33, Athens, Businessman	Machites	Red	Blue	Merged Tribe	47%	Quarter-Final; Episode 107
Marialena Roumelioti; 25, Athens, Personal Trainer	Machites	Blue	Blue	Merged Tribe	55%	Semi-Final; Episode 107
Ilias Bogdanos; 29, Athens, Singer		Red	Red	Merged Tribe	58%	Runner Up; Episode 108
Sakis Katsoulis; 30, Euboea, Businessman		Blue	Red	Merged Tribe	73%	Sole Survivor; Episode 108

=== Season Nine ===
- Date: December 26, 2021 - July 6, 2022 (135 episodes).
- Location: La Romana, Dominican Republic.
- Hosted by: Giorgos Lianos

The winner was Stathis Schizas

Survivor 9 was the ninth season of Survivor airing in Greece. It aired 4 nights a week, from Sunday to Wednesday.

List of Survivor Greece season 9 contestants
Contestant	Original tribe	Switched tribe	New tribe1	New tribe2	Merged tribe	Personal Statistics	Finish
Elisavet Spanou; 40, Athens, Singer	Diasimoi					60%	1st Voted Out; Episode 4
Giannis Chatzigeorgiou; 31, Athens, Actor, Singer	Diasimoi					0%	Walked; Episode 8
Paraskevi Stamatopoulou; 26, Athens, Strongman coach	Machites					62%	2nd Voted Out; Episode 13
Krystallia Koutsimani; 27, Trikala, Stay-at-home mom	Machites					30%	Evacuated; Episode 15
Stamatis Kalafatas; 35, Rhodes, Umbrella salesman	Machites					48%	Walked; Episode 15
Thanasis Bellos; 54, Athens, Football coach	Machites					86%	Walked; Episode 15
Chrisovalantis "Valantis" Avgenikos; 46, Athens, Singer	Diasimoi					15%	3rd Voted Out; Episode 18
Thanasis Viskadourakis; 53, Athens, Actor	Diasimoi					28%	4th Voted Out; Episode 23
Giorikas Pilidis; 21, Athens, World wrestling champion	Diasimoi					76%	Evacuated; Episode 24
Aspa Predari; 23, Athens, Businesswoman	Machites					42%	5th Voted Out; Episode 28
Lambros Konstantaras; 42, Athens, Journalist	Diasimoi					36%	6th Voted Out; Episode 33
Athina Evmorfiadi; 32, Patras, World kick boxing champion	Diasimoi					43%	Walked; Episode 33
Aggelos Poulis; 38, Los Angeles, Hollywood stuntman, parkourist	Machites	Machites				0%	Evacuated; Episode 38
Pelagia "Bella" Kazolea; 31, Athens, HR manager	Machites	Machites				36%	7th Voted Out; Episode 38
Sakis Arseniou; 34, Thessaloniki, Singer	Diasimoi	Diasimoi				36%	8th Voted Out; Episode 43
Giannis Tsolakis; 31, Alexandroupoli, Firefighter, radio producer	Machites	Machites				49%	9th Voted Out; Episode 48
Savvas Kalfas; 25, Athens, Psychologist	Machites	Machites				40%	10th Voted Out; Episode 53
Katia Tarabanko; 25, Mariupol, Model, Actress	Diasimoi	Diasimoi				39%	11th Voted Out; Episode 58
Andreas Matthaiakakis; 28, Athens, Professional poker player	Machites	Machites	Red			43%	12th Voted Out; Episode 63
Myriella Kourenti; 34, Athens, Actress	Diasimoi	Diasimoi	Red			41%	13th Voted Out; Episode 68
Evridiki Papadopoulou; 36, Haidari, Jewelry designer	Diasimoi	Diasimoi	Blue			44%	14th Voted Out; Episode 73
Nikos Antonopoulos; 26, Pyrgos, Model			Red			33%	15th Voted Out; Episode 78
Georgia "Jo" Maridaki; 19, Sitia, Veterinary student	Machites	Machites	Red			56%	16th Voted Out; Episode 82
Sofianna Avramaki; 26, Thessaloniki, Physiotherapist	Machites	Machites	Blue			46%	17th Voted Out; Episode 90
Giorgos Katsaounis; 27, Farsala, Farmer	Machites	Machites	Red			49%	Expelled; Episode 92
Apostolos Rouvas; 44, Athens, Chef	Diasimoi	Diasimoi	Red			44%	18th Voted Out; Episode 95
Nafsika Panagiotakopoulou; 28, Peristeri, Actress, Model	Diasimoi	Diasimoi	Red			42%	Evacuated; Episode 96
Takis Karagounias; 48, Aigio, Mercenary	Diasimoi	Diasimoi	Blue	Red		48%	19th Voted Out; Episode 100
Kostantinos Emmanouil; 37, Athens, Make up artist			Blue	Blue		22%	20th Voted Out; Episode 104
Stella Andreadou; 30, Thessaloniki, Special physical education teacher			Blue	Red		52%	21st Voted Out; Episode 110
Vrisiida Andriotou; 25, Thessaloniki, Model	Diasimoi	Diasimoi	Blue	Blue		43%	22nd Voted Out; Episode 115
Giorgos Talantsev; 29, Athens, Hotel manager	Diasimoi	Machites	Blue	Red	Merged Tribe	52%	23rd Voted Out; Episode 120
Spyros Martikas; 45, Piraeus, Pharmacist	Machites	Machites	Blue	Red	Merged Tribe	32%	24th Voted Out; Episode 125
Nikos Giannis; 39, Athens, Choreographer			Red	Blue	Merged Tribe	57%	25th Voted Out; Episode 128
Stavroula Chrisaeidi; 25, Athens, Track and field champion	Machites	Machites	Red	Blue	Merged Tribe	56%	26th Voted Out; Episode 131
Mei Emmanouilidou; 24, Kastoria, World rowing champion	Machites	Machites	Blue	Red	Merged Tribe	50%	Quarter-Final; Episode 133
Asimina Chatziandreou; 22, Athens, Football player	Machites	Machites	Red	Blue	Merged Tribe	49%	Semi-Final; Episode 133
Aristidis "Aris" Soiledis; 30, Athens, Football player	Diasimoi	Diasimoi	Blue	Blue	Merged Tribe	76%	Runner-up; Episode 134
Stathis Schizas; 30, Athens, Businessman	Diasimoi	Diasimoi	Red	Red	Merged Tribe	51%	Sole Survivor; Episode 134

=== Season Ten ===
- Date: January 8, 2023 - July 11, 2023 (118 episodes).
- Location: La Romana, Dominican Republic.
- Hosted by: Giorgos Lianos

The winner was Sakis Katsoulis, who is the only Greek contestant having won the show more than once.

Survivor All Star was the tenth season of Survivor, airing in Greece. It aired 5 nights a week, from Sunday to Thursday. At the game participated 38 returning castaways from seasons 5 to 9. Sakis Katsoulis was the winner, making him the only person who have won the game twice.

List of Survivor: All-Star contestants
Contestant	Original tribe	Switched tribe	Switched tribe 2	Switched tribe 3	Merged tribe	Personal Statistics	Finish
Vrisiida Andriotou; 26, Thessaloniki, Model; Survivor (2022)	Machites					50%	Walked; Episode 3
Periklis Kondylatos; 43, Athens, Jewelry Designer; Survivor (2021)	Machites					0%	1st Voted Out; Episode 4
Evrydiki Valavani; 35, Athens, Sports Journalist; Survivor (2017)	Diasimoi					31%	2nd Voted Out; Episode 8
Karolina Jacqueline Kalyva; 33, Toronto, Pilates Instructor; Survivor (2021)	Machites					33%	3rd Voted Out; Episode 12
Asimina Chatziandreou; 23, Athens, Heptathlon Athlete; Survivor (2022)	Diasimoi					55%	Expelled; Episode 15
Katerina Dalaka; 30, Katerini, Athlete; Survivor (2018), Winner Survivor (2019)	Diasimoi					62%	Expelled; Episode 15
Kostas Anagnostopoulos; 38, Athens, Ex-Mercenary; Survivor (2017)	Machites					29%	4th Voted Out; Episode 17
Sozon Palaistros-Charos; 44, Lemnos, Field hockey coach Survivor (2018)	Machites					23%	5th Voted Out; Episode 22
Chris Stamoulis; 34, Thessaloniki, Lawyer, Writer; Survivor (2021)	Machites					26%	6th Voted Out; Episode 27
Kostas Papadopoulos; 39, Russia, Pastry Chef; Survivor (2021)	Diasimoi					45%	7th Voted Out; Episode 32
Christina Kefala; 30, Athens, Influencer; Survivor (2021)	Diasimoi					15%	8th Voted Out; Episode 37
Stathis Schizas; 30, Athens, Entrepreneur; Winner Survivor (2022)	Diasimoi					71%	Walked; Episode 38
Evrydiki Papadopoulou; 38, Haidari, Jewelry designer Survivor (2022)	Diasimoi					33%	9th Voted Out; Episode 42
Tzo Maridaki; 20, Sitia, Veterinary student Survivor (2022)	Machites					48%	10th Voted Out; Episode 47
Nikoleta Mavridi; 28, Athens, Dancer; Survivor (2021)	Diasimoi					31%	11th Voted Out; Episode 52
Giorikas Pilidis; 23, Athens, Wrestling champion Survivor (2022)	Machites	Blue				65%	Expelled; Episode 54
Ilias Gotsis; 33, Athens, Personal Trainer; Winner Survivor (2018)	Machites	Blue				62%	Expelled; Episode 54
Eleni Haberi; 28, Volos, Gymnast; Survivor (2021)	Diasimoi	Blue				50%	12th Voted Out; Episode 57
Eleftheria Eleftheriou; 33, Paralimni, Singer; Survivor (2021)	Diasimoi	Blue				29%	13th Voted Out; Episode 62
Afroditi Skafida; 40, Athens, Trainer; Survivor (2019)	Diasimoi	Red	Red			57%	Expelled; Episode 65
Panagiotis Konstantinidis; 29, Athens, Nutritionist; Survivor (2019)	Machites	Red	Red			35%	14th Voted Out; Episode 69
Evi Saltaferidou; 32, Thessaloniki, Fitness Coach; Survivor (2018)	Machites	Red	Red			46%	15th Voted Out; Episode 74
Stelios Chantampakis; 37, Volos, TV Host, Entrepreneur; Survivor (2017)	Diasimoi	Red	Red			50%	Walked; Episode 78
Nikolas Agorou; 31, Athens, Farmer; Survivor (2018)	Machites	Blue	Blue			44%	16th Voted Out; Episode 79
Ria Kolovou; 34, Edessa, Entrepreneur; Survivor (2019)	Machites	Blue	Blue			41%	17th Voted Out; Episode 82
Giorgos Koromi; 35, Athens, Entrepreneur; Survivor (2021)	Diasimoi	Red	Red			48%	18th Voted Out; Episode 86
Spyros Martikas; 46, Keratsini, Pharmacist; Survivor (2022)	Diasimoi	Blue	Blue			36%	19th Voted Out; Episode 89
Takis Karagounias; 49, Aigio, Mercenary; Survivor (2022)	Machites	Red	Red			50%	20th Voted Out; Episode 94
Giorgos Asimakopoulos; 31, Patras, Entrepreneur; Survivor (2021)	Machites	Blue	Blue			39%	21st Voted Out; Episode 98
Melina Metaxa; 36, Limassol, Dancer, Gymnast; Survivor (2018)	Machites	Blue	Red			37%	22nd Voted Out; Episode 102
Konstantinos Vasalos; 33, Athens, Personal trainer Survivor (2017)	Machites	Red	Red	Red	Merged Tribe	42%	23rd Voted Out; Episode 106
Ilias Bogdanos; 31, Athens, Singer; Survivor (2021)	Machites	Red	Blue	Blue	Merged Tribe	54%	24th Voted Out; Episode 108
Stavroula Chrysaeidi; 26, Athens, Track and field champion Survivor (2022)	Diasimoi	Red	Blue	Red	Merged Tribe	61%	25th Voted Out; Episode 110
Stella Andreadou; 31, Thessaloniki, Physical Teacher; Survivor (2022)	Machites	Blue	Blue	Blue	Merged Tribe	57%	26th Voted Out; Episode 114
Marios Priamos Ioannidis; 36, Cyprus, Diving instructor Survivor (2017)	Diasimoi	Blue	Blue	Blue	Merged Tribe	46%	Quarter-final; Episode 117
Marialena Roumelioti; 27, Athens, Personal Trainer; Survivor (2021)	Machites	Red	Red	Red	Merged Tribe	51%	Semi-final; Episode 117
Nikos Bartzis; 28, Corinth, Farmer; Survivor (2021)	Diasimoi	Blue	Blue	Blue	Merged Tribe	41%	Runner up Episode 118
Sakis Katsoulis; 32, Euboea, Entrepreneur; Winner Survivor (2021)	Diasimoi	Red	Red	Red	Merged Tribe	74%	Sole Survivor; Episode 118

=== Season Eleven ===
- Date: January 7, 2024 - June 26, 2024 (116 episodes).
- Location: La Romana, Dominican Republic.
- Hosted by: Giorgos Lianos

Survivor 11 was the eleventh season of Survivor airing in Greece. It aired 5 nights a week, from Sunday to Thursday.

The winner was Daniel Nurka.

Contestant	Original tribe	Switched tribe	Switched tribe 2	Switched tribe 3	Merged tribe	Win rate	Finished
Andriana Kagia; 29, Athens, Aerial Performer	Machites					25%	1st Eliminated; Episode 4
Paulos Papadopoulos; 31, Chalkidiki, Bodyguard, Author	Diasimoi					21%	2nd Eliminated; Episode 8
Christos Volikakis; 35, Volos, World Champion Cyclist	Diasimoi					35%	Walked; Episode 12
Kristi Kathargia; 32, Thessaloniki, Psychologist	Diasimoi					37%	3rd Eliminated; Episode 12
Sotiris Lamai; 38, Peristeri, Nightclub P.R.	Machites					17%	4th Eliminated; Episode 16
Aggelos Georgoudakis; 21, Aigio, MMA Athlete	Machites					65%	Evacuated; Episode 17
Rob James Seymour; 28, Inverurie/Athens, Model	Machites					32%	5th Eliminated; Episode 20
Kostas Vougioukalakis; 29, Chania, Real Estate Agent	Machites					100%	Evacuated; Episode 23
Zoi Asoumanaki; 22, Rethymno, Miss International Greece 2023	Diasimoi					24%	6th Eliminated; Episode 24
Olga Piliaki; 35, Athens, Athlete	Diasimoi					45%	Evacuated; Episode 28
Nikos Ganos; 40, Athens, Singer	Diasimoi					37%	7th Eliminated; Episode 28
Elena Amanatidou; 25, Thessaloniki, Heptathlon Athlete	Diasimoi					27%	8th Eliminated; Episode 32
Maria Antona; 34, Thessaloniki, Journalist	Diasimoi					42%	9th Eliminated; Episode 37
Pantelis Giannakakis; 23, Siteia, Project Manager	Machites					14%	Walked; Episode 38
Marilina Vakondiou; 30, Syros, Glute Makeover Specialist	Machites	Blue				32%	10th Eliminated; Episode 42
Nikos Rikounakis; 28, Chania, Water Sports Trainer	Diasimoi	Red	Red			23%	11th Eliminated; Episode 47
Evgenia Borla; 32, Karditsa, Trainer	Diasimoi	Blue	Blue			13%	12th Eliminated; Episode 52
Ioanna Tzavela; 24, Athens, Athlete	Machites	Red	Red			50%	13th Eliminated; Episode 57
Aira Adomaityte; 23, Athens, Model	Machites	Red	Red			44%	14th Eliminated; Episode 62
James Kafetzis; 27, Rhodes, Businessman; Survivor (2021)	Machites	Blue	Blue			52%	15th Eliminated; Episode 67
Alexis Pappas; 37, Athens, Actor, Model; Survivor (2021)	Diasimoi	Red	Red			49%	Walked; Episode 68
Savvas Gentsoglou; 34, Kavala, Football player	Diasimoi	Blue	Blue			42%	Evacuated; Episode 70
Giannis Perpataris; 34, Peristeri, Olive Grower	Machites	Red	Red			50%	16th Eliminated; Episode 72
Chrysa Chatzigeorgiou; 20, Athens, Maritime Student	Machites	Blue	Blue			42%	Walked; Episode 73
Thodoris Tourkogeorgos; 30, Athens, Fitness Manager	Diasimoi	Blue	Blue			38%	17th Eliminated; Episode 77
Anastasia Tserou; 29, Athens, Basketball Player	Diasimoi	Red	Blue			50%	Evacuated; Episode 78
Asimina Chatziandreou; 24, Athens, Football player Survivor (2022)	Diasimoi	Red	Red			63%	18th Eliminated; Episode 82
Stavroula Chrysaeidi; 27, Athens, Track and field champion Survivor (2022)	Machites	Blue	Blue			63%	Walked; Episode 85
Giorgos Papacharalampous; 29, Paphos/Athens, Trainer	Diasimoi	Blue	Red	Red		44%	19th Eliminated; Episode 97
Stamatis Taladianos; 32, Volos, Nightclub Owner	Machites	Blue	Blue	Blue		43%	20th Eliminated; Episode 102
Christoforos Taxidis; 23, Aspropyrgos, Courier	Machites	Red	Red	Red		41%	21st Eliminated; Episode 107
Dora Nikoli; 46, Thessaloniki, English Teacher	Machites	Blue	Red	Blue	Merged Tribe	46%	22nd Eliminated; Episode 112
Giorgos Gioulekas; 29, Thessaloniki, Businessman	Machites	Red	Red	Red	Merged Tribe	57%	Semi-final; Episode 115
Katerina Dalaka; 31, Katerini, Heptathlon Athlete; Survivor (2019) Winner	Diasimoi	Red	Red	Red	Merged Tribe	61%	3rd place Episode 116
Fanis Boletsis; 27, Athens, Business Development Manager	Machites	Red	Blue	Blue	Merged Tribe	71%	Runner up Episode 116
Daniel Nurka; 27, Athens, Actor	Diasimoi	Blue	Blue	Blue	Merged Tribe	56%	Sole Survivor; Episode 116

=== Season Twelve ===
- Date: September 16, 2024 - December 12, 2024 (61 episodes).
- Location: La Romana, Dominican Republic.
- Hosted by: Giorgos Lianos

Survivor 12 was the twelfth season of Survivor airing in Greece. It aired 4 nights a week, from Monday to Thursday.

The winner was Ninos Nikolaidis.

Contestant	Original tribe	Switched tribe 1	Switched tribe 2	Switched tribe 3	Merged tribe	Statistics	Finished
Tasos Panas; 38, Athens, Trainer	Tigers					53%	Walked; Episode 5
Gesthimani Koutouzoglou; 36, Thessaloniki, Special Forces NCO	Tigers					47%	Walked; Episode 8
Paraskevi Kerasioti; 23, Patras, Model	Tigers					27%	Walked; Episode 10
Maria Kerasioti; 25, Patras, Trainer	Tigers					0%	1st Eliminated; Episode 10
Giannis Grimanelis; 31, Athens, Welder	Tigers					55%	Walked; Episode 12
Stefanos Vlachos; 20, Athens, Nurse	Eagles	Eagles				23%	2nd Eliminated; Episode 15
Aggeliki Katsini; 36, Athens, Journalist	Eagles	Eagles				53%	3rd Eliminated; Episode 20
Panagiotis Tsakalakos; 45, Athens, Musician, Singer	Tigers	Tigers				48%	4th Eliminated; Episode 25
Ekaterina Litvinova; 26, Thessaloniki, Actress, Tik Toker	Eagles	Eagles				44%	5th Eliminated; Episode 30
Vladimiros Siikis; 36, Paphos, Businessman	Tigers	Eagles	Tigers			39%	6th Eliminated; Episode 35
Apostolos Mixail; 30, Limassol, Content Creator	Eagles	Eagles	Eagles			36%	7th Eliminated; Episode 40
Mairi Peteinari; 20, Kalamata, Model	Eagles	Eagles	Eagles	Tigers		51%	8th Eliminated; Episode 49
Maria Lymperopoulou; 23, Athens, Marketing Director	Tigers	Tigers	Tigers	Tigers		52%	9th Eliminated; Episode 51
Georgia Georgopoulou; 50, Athens, Event Planner	Tigers	Tigers	Tigers	Tigers		38%	10th Eliminated; Episode 53
Michalis Kondylas; 24, Syros, Journalist	Eagles	Eagles	Eagles	Tigers	Merged Tribe	39%	11th Eliminated; Episode 57
Phoebe Delikoura; 27, Athens, Actress	Tigers	Tigers	Eagles	Eagles	Merged Tribe	55%	12th Eliminated; Episode 58
Eleni Katsara; 34, Thessaloniki, Trainer	Eagles	Eagles	Eagles	Eagles	Merged Tribe	50%	13th Eliminated; Episode 58
Christiana Grigoraskou; 22, Athens, Fitness Champion	Tigers	Tigers	Tigers	Eagles	Merged Tribe	45%	14th Eliminated; Episode 59
Vicky Peteinari; 20, Kalamata, Model	Eagles	Eagles	Eagles	Tigers	Merged Tribe	49%	15th Eliminated; Episode 59
Aggelos Tsakas; 32, Larissa, Dancer	Eagles	Eagles	Eagles	Eagles	Merged Tribe	54%	16th Eliminated; Episode 60
Orfeas Genkianidis; 24, Athens, Content Creator	Eagles	Tigers	Tigers	Eagles	Merged Tribe	54%	17th Eliminated; Episode 60
Stefania Glara; 23, Kalabaka, Martal Arts Trainer		Tigers	Tigers	Eagles	Merged Tribe	61%	18th Eliminated; Episode 61
John Rigakis; 39, Athens, DJ, Event Manager	Eagles	Eagles	Eagles	Tigers	Merged Tribe	44%	19th Eliminated; Episode 61
Giannis Alkeo Keli; 31, Athens, Cross fit Trainer		Tigers	Tigers	Eagles	Merged Tribe	62%	Runner Up; Episode 61
Ninos Nikolaidis; 26, Volos, World Rowing Champion	Tigers	Tigers	Tigers	Tigers	Merged Tribe	55%	Sole Survivor; Episode 61
