= World Party (disambiguation) =

World Party were a British musical group led by Karl Wallinger.

World Party may also refer to:

- World Party (TV series), a 2013–2016 Greek travel show
- World Party (album), a 1999 studio album by Goodie Mob
- "World Party" (song), a 1988 track by The Waterboys
- Worms World Party, a 2001 video game
- Zumba Fitness: World Party, a 2013 video game
