= Survivor Greece season 11 =

Survivor Greece
- Season 11
- Presented by: Giorgos Lianos
- No. of days: 174
- No. of castaways: 36
- Winner: Daniel Nurka
- Runners-up: Fanis Boletsis; Katerina Dalaka
- Location: La Romana, Dominican Republic
- No. of episodes: 116

Release
- Original network: Skai TV
- Original release: January 7 – June 26, 2024

Additional information
- Filming dates: January 4 – June 26, 2024

Season chronology
- ← Previous; Season 10 Next → Season 12

The eleventh season of the popular reality show Survivor Greece, premiered on January 7, 2024 on Skai TV in Greece and (via simulcast) Sigma TV in Cyprus. Giorgos Lianos returned as host for his sixth consecutive season. Broadly following the format established by earlier seasons, a team of civilians named the Machites ("Fighters") and a team of celebrities named the Diasimoi ("Celebrities") are invited to compete against one another for several months in a series of physical challenges on a deserted island at the exotic La Romana in the Dominican Republic. The competitors are only permitted to bring a very minimal amount of clothing and basic food supplies.

For the first time in the programme's history, the producers decided to alter the elimination process such that competitors would be eliminated by athletic challenges instead of by viewer votes.

== Contestants ==
The game began with twenty competitors divided equally into two teams of ten: the civilian Machites, colour-coded in blue, and the celebrity Diasimoi, in red. Three of the ten initial Diasimoi members – Alexis, Asimina, and Katerina – were competitors in earlier Survivor seasons.

At the beginning of week 3, four additional competitors joined, with each team gaining two: Daniel Nurka and Zoi Asoumanaki joined the Diasimoi, and Aira Adomaityte and Sotiris Lamai joined the Machites.

A total of six new competitors joined the competition in week 6. In episode 21, each team gained three new players: past season contestants James Kafetzis and Stavroula Chrysaeidi both joined the Machites along with new contestant Kostas Vougioukalakis, while Elena Amanatidou and Thodoris Tourkogeorgos went to the Diasimoi. When Kostas fell ill and was taken to hospital after competing in only one match, he was removed from the competition in episode 22 and replaced by Giorgos Gioulekas.

Four new contestants joined at the start of week 8 (episode 29). Evgenia Borla, Anastasia Tserou, and Nikos Rikounakis all went to the Diasimoi, while Christoforos Taxidis joined the Machites, meaning that at that point in the game, there were 11 Diasimoi and 12 Machites.

Two new male contestants entered at the beginning of week 9 (episode 33): Giorgos Papacharalampous joined the Diasimoi and Pantelis Giannakakis joined the Machites.

At the start of week 10 (episode 38), the two teams were shuffled and had their "Diasimoi" and "Machites" names dropped in favour of exclusively referring to both teams by the colours with which they were coded. Giorgos Gioulekas, Fanis, Giannis, Christoforos, Ioanna, and Aira were moved from the Machites to the new version of the Red Team, while Giorgos Papacharalampous, Savvas, Daniel, Thodoris, and Evgenia moved from the Diasimoi to the new Blue Team. The other players stayed at their original teams.

A second reshuffle happened at the start of week 11 (episode 43), whereby Fanis and Anastasia from the Red Team were switched with Giorgos Papacharalampous and Dora from the Blue Team.

Contestant	Original tribe	Switched tribe	Switched tribe 2	Switched tribe 3	Merged tribe	Win rate	Finished
Andriana Kagia; 29, Athens, Aerial Performer	Machites					25%	1st Eliminated; Episode 4
Paulos Papadopoulos; 31, Chalkidiki, Bodyguard, Author	Diasimoi					21%	2nd Eliminated; Episode 8
Christos Volikakis; 35, Volos, World Champion Cyclist	Diasimoi					35%	Walked; Episode 12
Kristi Kathargia; 32, Thessaloniki, Psychologist	Diasimoi					37%	3rd Eliminated; Episode 12
Sotiris Lamai; 38, Peristeri, Nightclub P.R.	Machites					17%	4th Eliminated; Episode 16
Aggelos Georgoudakis; 21, Aigio, MMA Athlete	Machites					65%	Evacuated; Episode 17
Rob James Seymour; 28, Inverurie/Athens, Model	Machites					32%	5th Eliminated; Episode 20
Kostas Vougioukalakis; 29, Chania, Real Estate Agent	Machites					100%	Evacuated; Episode 23
Zoi Asoumanaki; 22, Rethymno, Miss International Greece 2023	Diasimoi					24%	6th Eliminated; Episode 24
Olga Piliaki; 35, Athens, Athlete	Diasimoi					45%	Evacuated; Episode 28
Nikos Ganos; 40, Athens, Singer	Diasimoi					37%	7th Eliminated; Episode 28
Elena Amanatidou; 25, Thessaloniki, Heptathlon Athlete	Diasimoi					27%	8th Eliminated; Episode 32
Maria Antona; 34, Thessaloniki, Journalist	Diasimoi					42%	9th Eliminated; Episode 37
Pantelis Giannakakis; 23, Siteia, Project Manager	Machites					14%	Walked; Episode 38
Marilina Vakondiou; 30, Syros, Glute Makeover Specialist	Machites	Blue				32%	10th Eliminated; Episode 42
Nikos Rikounakis; 28, Chania, Water Sports Trainer	Diasimoi	Red	Red			23%	11th Eliminated; Episode 47
Evgenia Borla; 32, Karditsa, Trainer	Diasimoi	Blue	Blue			13%	12th Eliminated; Episode 52
Ioanna Tzavela; 24, Athens, Athlete	Machites	Red	Red			50%	13th Eliminated; Episode 57
Aira Adomaityte; 23, Athens, Model	Machites	Red	Red			44%	14th Eliminated; Episode 62
James Kafetzis; 27, Rhodes, Businessman; Survivor (2021)	Machites	Blue	Blue			52%	15th Eliminated; Episode 67
Alexis Pappas; 37, Athens, Actor, Model; Survivor (2021)	Diasimoi	Red	Red			49%	Walked; Episode 68
Savvas Gentsoglou; 34, Kavala, Football player	Diasimoi	Blue	Blue			42%	Evacuated; Episode 70
Giannis Perpataris; 34, Peristeri, Olive Grower	Machites	Red	Red			50%	16th Eliminated; Episode 72
Chrysa Chatzigeorgiou; 20, Athens, Maritime Student	Machites	Blue	Blue			42%	Walked; Episode 73
Thodoris Tourkogeorgos; 30, Athens, Fitness Manager	Diasimoi	Blue	Blue			38%	17th Eliminated; Episode 77
Anastasia Tserou; 29, Athens, Basketball Player	Diasimoi	Red	Blue			50%	Evacuated; Episode 78
Asimina Chatziandreou; 24, Athens, Football player Survivor (2022)	Diasimoi	Red	Red			63%	18th Eliminated; Episode 82
Stavroula Chrysaeidi; 27, Athens, Track and field champion Survivor (2022)	Machites	Blue	Blue			63%	Walked; Episode 85
Giorgos Papacharalampous; 29, Paphos/Athens, Trainer	Diasimoi	Blue	Red	Red		44%	19th Eliminated; Episode 97
Stamatis Taladianos; 32, Volos, Nightclub Owner	Machites	Blue	Blue	Blue		43%	20th Eliminated; Episode 102
Christoforos Taxidis; 23, Aspropyrgos, Courier	Machites	Red	Red	Red		42%	21st Eliminated; Episode 107
Dora Nikoli; 46, Thessaloniki, English Teacher	Machites	Blue	Red	Blue	Merged Tribe	46%	22nd Eliminated; Episode 112
Giorgos Gioulekas; 29, Thessaloniki, Businessman	Machites	Red	Red	Red	Merged Tribe	57%	Semi-final; Episode 115
Katerina Dalaka; 31, Katerini, Heptathlon Athlete; Survivor (2019) Winner	Diasimoi	Red	Red	Red	Merged Tribe	61%	Runner up Episode 116
Fanis Boletsis; 27, Athens, Business Development Manager	Machites	Red	Blue	Blue	Merged Tribe	69%	Runner up Episode 116
Daniel Nurka; 27, Albania, Actor	Diasimoi	Blue	Blue	Blue	Merged Tribe	56%	Sole Survivor; Episode 116

== Match Results ==
Episode			Winner	Score	Reward
Week	No.	Air date	Winner	Score	Reward
1	1	January 7, 2024	Machites	-	Fire kit
1	1	January 7, 2024	Diasimoi	10-4	Immunity
1	2	January 8, 2024	Diasimoi	10-8	Immunity
1	3	January 9, 2024	Diasimoi	10-9	Immunity
1	4	January 10, 2024	Diasimoi	10-5	Omelette / golden eggs
2	5	January 14, 2024	Machites	10-6	Immunity and pancakes with honey
2	6	January 15, 2024	Machites	10-8	Immunity
2	7	January 16, 2024	Diasimoi	10-9	Immunity
2	8	January 17, 2024	Machites	10-6	Fishing kit
3	9	January 21, 2024	Diasimoi	12-11	Immunity and pizza
3	10	January 22, 2024	Machites	12-11	Immunity
3	11	January 23, 2024	Machites	12-11	Immunity
3	12	January 24, 2024	Diasimoi	10-8	Croissants with tahini
4	13	January 28, 2024	Diasimoi	12-11	Immunity and rice
4	14	January 29, 2024	Diasimoi	10-4	Donuts (quiz)
4	14	January 29, 2024	Diasimoi	10-4	Immunity
4	15	January 30, 2024	Machites	12-9	Immunity
4	16	January 31, 2024	Machites	12-9	Golden eggs / salad & jelly
5	17	February 4, 2024	Diasimoi	10-8	Immunity and moussaka with salad & cake
5	18	February 5, 2024	Diasimoi	10-6	Immunity
5	19	February 6, 2024	Diasimoi	10-7	Immunity
5	19	February 6, 2024	Diasimoi	7-3	Cupcakes (mini game)
5	20	February 7, 2024	Diasimoi	10-6	Loukoumades with honey
6	21	February 11, 2024	Machites	12-8	Immunity and Energy food
6	22	February 12, 2024	Machites	12-4	Immunity
6	23	February 13, 2024	Machites	12-8	Immunity
6	24	February 14, 2024	Diasimoi	12-10	Communication Reward and Coffee
7	25	February 18, 2024	Machites	12-10	Immunity and Pasta
7	26	February 19, 2024	Diasimoi	12-8	Immunity
7	27	February 20, 2024	Machites	10-7	Immunity
7	28	February 21, 2024	Diasimoi	10-7	Communication Reward and peanut butter
8	29	February 25, 2024	Machites	10-7	Immunity
8	29	February 25, 2024	Acun Medya	3-0	Special footvolley^{1} game
8	30	February 26, 2024	Machites	12-10	Immunity
8	31	February 27, 2024	Machites	12-8	Immunity
8	32	February 28, 2024	Diasimoi	10-7	Communication Reward
9	33	March 3, 2024	Diasimoi	10-8	Immunity and meat
9	34	March 4, 2024	Machites	10-5	Immunity
9	35	March 5, 2024	Machites	10-8	Immunity
9	36	March 6, 2024	Machites	10-6	Immunity
9	36	March 6, 2024	Machites	5-4	Carrot Cake (mini game)
9	37	March 7, 2024	Machites	10-7	Biftekia, Caesar salad and dessert (ravani)
10	38	March 10, 2024	Red	12-9	Immunity and Burger
10	39	March 11, 2024	Red	12-10	Immunity
10	40	March 12, 2024	Blue	12-8	Immunity
10	40	March 13, 2024	Red	7-5	Cheesecake (quiz)
10	41	March 13, 2024	Red	12-7	Immunity & Halvas
10	42	March 14, 2024	Red	12-5	Omelette, cherry juice and pillows for 1 night
11	43	March 17, 2024	Blue	12-4	Immunity & Halvas
11	44	March 18, 2024	Blue	12-10	Immunity
11	45	March 19, 2024	Blue	12-9	Immunity
11	46	March 20, 2024	Blue	12-9	Immunity & Sarakostiana with ouzo
11	47	March 21, 2024	Red	12-10	Bakaliaros (European hake), skordalia and sarakostiana
12	48	March 24, 2024	Red	12-4	Immunity & Empanadas and churros with chocolate
12	49	March 25, 2024	Blue	12-8	Immunity
12	50	March 26, 2024	Red	12-10	Immunity
12	51	March 27, 2024	Red	10-6	Immunity
12	52	March 28, 2024	Blue	10-9	Communication reward & Coffee and fruit salad
13	53	March 31, 2024	Blue	12-7	Immunity & Pizza
13	54	April 1, 2024	Red	12-10	Immunity
13	55	April 2, 2024	Blue	12-5	Immunity
13	56	April 3, 2024	Red	12-11	Immunity
13	57	April 4, 2024	Red	12-5	Communication reward & Crepes with honey, fruit and orange juice
14	58	April 7, 2024	Blue	12-7	Immunity & Meal
14	59	April 8, 2024	Red	12-11	Immunity
14	60	April 9, 2024	Blue	12-8	Immunity
14	61	April 10, 2024	Blue	12-6	Immunity
14	62	April 11, 2024	Red	6-4	Communication reward & Lunch
15	63	April 14, 2024	James & Giorgos G.		Merge Party
15	64	April 15, 2024	Blue	12-11	Immunity
15	65	April 16, 2024	Blue	12-9	Immunity
15	66	April 17, 2024	Red	12-3	Immunity
15	67	April 18, 2024	Red	12-9	Immunity & trip to Punta Cana and Coco Bongo club
16	68	April 21, 2024	Blue	12-6	Immunity, Pizza and Burgers
16	69	April 22, 2024	Blue	12-6	Immunity
16	70	April 23, 2024	Blue	12-10	Immunity
16	71	April 24, 2024	Red	12-8	Immunity & Club sandwich with rice chips
16	72	April 25, 2024	Blue	10-8	Trip to New York City
17	73	April 28, 2024	Blue	12-11	Immunity & Water sports & Lunch
17	74	April 29, 2024	Red	8-7	Quiz - Donuts
17	74	April 29, 2024	Red	12-7	Immunity
17	75	April 30, 2024	Blue	12-8	Immunity
17	76	May 1, 2024	Blue	5-4	Quiz - Oreo Cheesecake
17	76	May 1, 2024	Red	12-6	Immunity
17	77	May 2, 2024	Blue	12-8	Trip to Curaçao (Mixed game with Turkish Survivor)
18	78	May 5, 2024	Red	10-8	Immunity & Easter meal
18	79	May 6, 2024	Blue	10-5	Immunity
18	80	May 7, 2024	Red	10-7	Immunity
18	81	May 8, 2024	Blue	10-4	Immunity
18	82	May 9, 2024	Red	10-2	Communication Reward & Pita gyros
19	83	May 12, 2024	Blue	12-11	Immunity (Mixed game with Turkish Survivor)
19	84	May 13, 2024	Blue	12-10	Immunity (Mixed game with Turkish Survivor)
19	85	May 14, 2024	Blue	12-11	Immunity (Mixed game with Turkish Survivor)
19	86	May 15, 2024	Red	12-10	Immunity (Mixed game with Turkish Survivor)
19	87	May 16, 2024	Blue	8-3	Communication Reward
20	88	May 19, 2024	Red	12-8	Immunity & Water sports & Lunch (Mixed game with Turkish Survivor)
20	89	May 20, 2024	Blue	12-7	Immunity (Mixed game with Turkish Survivor)
20	90	May 21, 2024	Red	12-9	Immunity (Mixed game with Turkish Survivor)
20	91	May 22, 2024	Blue	12-7	Immunity (Mixed game with Turkish Survivor)
20	92	May 23, 2024	Blue	8-7	Communication Reward & BBQ
21	93	May 26, 2024	Blue	12-9	Immunity (Mixed game with Turkish Survivor)
21	94	May 27, 2024	Red	12-10	Immunity (Mixed game with Turkish Survivor)
21	95	May 28, 2024	Blue	12-11	Immunity (Mixed game with Turkish Survivor)
21	96	May 29, 2024	Red	12-11	Lunch and relax at a villa
21	97	May 30, 2024	Blue	8-5	Communication Reward
22	98	June 2, 2024	Blue	12-7	Immunity (Mixed game with Turkish Survivor)
22	99	June 3, 2024	Red	12-10	Immunity (Mixed game with Turkish Survivor)
22	100	June 4, 2024	Blue	12-7	Immunity (Mixed game with Turkish Survivor)
22	101	June 5, 2024	Red	12-7	Immunity (Mixed game with Turkish Survivor)
23	103	June 10, 2024	Blue	12-7	Immunity (Mixed game with Turkish Survivor)
23	104	June 11, 2024	Blue	10-2	Immunity (Mixed game with Turkish Survivor)
23	105	June 12, 2024	Red	12-10	Immunity (Mixed game with Turkish Survivor)
23	106	June 13, 2024	Blue	10-5	Communication Reward
24	108	June 16, 2024	Daniel	-	Individual immunity
24	109	June 17, 2024	Fanis	-	Individual immunity
24	110	June 18, 2024	Fanis	-	Individual immunity
24	111	June 19, 2024	Blue	10-6	Communication Reward
25	113	June 23, 2024	Daniel	-	Car reward Semi - Final (Mother's quiz)
25	114	June 24, 2024	Giorgos G.	-	Car reward Final

^{1} In episode 29, the second task was a footvolley match between pairs of contestants (both Diasimoi and Machites) and a team consisting of Acun Ilıcalı (owner of Survivor Greece production company Acun Medya) and Brazilian football legend Ronaldinho.

== Finals ==
Episode	Winner	Notes
110	Fanis; Katerina	Fanis and Katerina qualified to the semifinal.
115	Daniel; Fanis; ~~Giorgos G.~~; Katerina	At the semi final after picking numbers Giorgos G. faced Katerina and Daniel competed against Fanis. Katerina defeated Giorgos G. with a 5-3 score and qualified to the final. Fanis defeated Daniel with a 5-3 score and qualified to the final. Daniel and Giorgos G. competed against each other for the last place at the final. Daniel won with 5-1 score. Daniel, Fanis and Katerina qualified to the final, while Giorgos G. was eliminated.
116	Daniel Nurka	At the Final, Daniel, Katerina and Fanis competed against each other starting with 7 lives. At the end Daniel disqualified Katerina and then Fanis and was named Sole Survivor 2024. Season finale

== Eliminations ==
At the ends of three out of four episodes, whatever team lost the episode's immunity match must vote to nominate one of their teammates to compete in that week's elimination challenge. These elimination challenges were newly introduced for this season, replacing the viewer votes that had previously determined who would be eliminated from the competition each week.

In the third vote of each week, once the team votes have been cast and a third nominee chosen, the gender group majority of those three nominees determines the gender of all competitors who will compete in the elimination challenge, since all competitors entering the elimination challenge must be of the same gender to avoid unreasonable gendered physiological inequality between the challengers. If all three nominees are of the same gender, no further team voting is required. Otherwise, the nominee who does not belong to the gender of the other two is automatically removed from the challenge, and a second vote for that episode (and final one for that week) is cast to nominate an appropriately gendered challenger to replace them.

Once three team-voted nominees of the same gender group have been determined, one "MVP" competitor – chosen based on their performance statistics for the week – nominates a fourth and final challenger from their opposing team (who must also belong to the previously determined gender group). The MVP also selects the specific task that will form the basis of the elimination challenge.

Finally, the four challengers compete in the elimination challenge set by the MVP. They initially compete in pairs, with each pair's winner securing their ongoing participation in the competition. The losing challengers of each pair then compete against each other to determine the overall loser of the challenge, who is then eliminated from the competition.

There was a format change in week 9 necessitated by the addition of a fifth weekly episode from that point onward. Since there would henceforth be four rather than three episodes of matches with an elimination vote at the end, the MVP would no longer nominate the fourth elimination challenge player. The MVP would, however, continue to be recognised and choose the task used for the elimination challenge. Additionally, if any vote were to result in a tie, the MVP would be given the final decision on which of the tied players to nominate for the elimination challenge.

=== Elimination Challenge Nominations and Results ===
Week #		1				2			3^{3}				4			5				6^{3}			7				8			9				10				11				12				13					14					15				16				17				18				19				20				21			22				23			24			
Episode #		1	2	3		5	6	7	9	10	11		13	14	15	17		18^{7}	19^{7}	21	22	23	25	26	27		29	30	31	33	34	35	36	38	39	40	41	43	44	45	46	48	49	50	51	53	54	55		56	58	59	60		61	64	65	66	67	68	69	70	71	73	74	75	76	78	79	80	81	83	84	85	86	88	89	90	91	93	94	95	98	99	100	101	103	104	105	108	109	110	
Losing Tribe		Machites	Machites	Machites	Substitution^{1}	Diasimoi	Diasimoi	Machites	Machites	Diasimoi	Diasimoi	Substitution^{1}	Machites	Machites	Diasimoi	Machites		Machites	Machites	Diasimoi	Diasimoi	Diasimoi	Diasimoi	Machites	Diasimoi	Substitution^{1}	Diasimoi	Diasimoi	Diasimoi	Machites	Diasimoi	Diasimoi	Diasimoi	Blue	Blue	Red	Blue	Red	Red	Red	Red	Blue	Red	Blue	Blue	Red	Blue	Red	Substitution	Blue	Red	Blue	Red	Substitution	Red	Red	Red	Blue	Blue	Red	Red	Red	Blue	Red	Blue	Red	Blue	Blue	Red	Blue	Red	Red	Red	Red	Blue	Blue	Red	Blue	Red	Red	Blue	Red	Red	Blue	Red	Blue	Red	Red	Blue	-	-	-	
Voted for by...	Daniel	Not competing yet								Kristi	Olga				Alexis					Zoi	Olga	Maria	Thodoris		Alexis		Elena	Maria	Default^{11}		Evgenia	Anastasia	Default	Evgenia	Marilina		Marilina					Evgenia		Anastasia	Chrysa		Thodoris		Chrysa	Stavroula		Thodoris		Chrysa				James	Thodoris				Thodoris		Thodoris		Anastasia	Stavroula		Stamatis					Stamatis	Stamatis		Fanis			Stamatis			Dora		Stamatis			Dora	Dora	Giorgos G.	Katerina	
Voted for by...	Fanis	Dora	Rob James	Andriana	Unwell^{2}			Rob James	Rob James			Dora	Rob James	Sotiris		Zoi^{6}	Aira^{6}	Aira	Default^{7}					Marilina		Stamatis				Marilina						Aira						Evgenia		Anastasia	Stavroula		Stamatis		Chrysa	Stavroula		Thodoris		Chrysa				James	Thodoris				Thodoris		Thodoris		Anastasia	Stavroula		Stamatis					Daniel	Stamatis		Daniel			Stamatis			Dora		Stamatis			Dora	Dora	Giorgos G.	Katerina	
Voted for by...	Katerina					Paulos	Alexis			Kristi	Maria				Nikos G.					Zoi	Olga	Maria	Thodoris		Daniel		Elena		Default^{11}		Evgenia	Maria	Default			Aira		Nikos R.	Giorgos P.	Giannis	Christoforos		Aira			Ioanna		Aira			Aira		Dora		Asimina	Giorgos P.	Christoforos			Giannis	Dora	Christoforos		Giorgos P.		Asimina			Asimina		Dora	Christoforos	Christoforos	Giorgos P.			Christoforos		Giorgos P.	Christoforos		Giorgos G.	Christoforos		Giorgos G.		Christoforos	Giorgos G.		Fanis	Daniel	Daniel	
Voted for by...	Giorgos G.	Not competing yet																						Marilina		Stamatis				Marilina						Aira		Nikos R.	Giorgos P.	Christoforos	Christoforos		Aira			Aira		Aira			Aira		Dora		Asimina	Giorgos P.	Christoforos			Giannis	Dora	Christoforos		Giorgos P.		Asimina			Asimina		Dora	Dora	Christoforos	Giorgos P.			Christoforos		Giorgos P.	Christoforos		Katerina	Christoforos		Katerina		Christoforos	Katerina		Dora	Daniel	Daniel	
Voted for by...	Dora	Marilina	Stamatis	Ioanna	Marilina			Rob James	Chrysa			Marilina	Giannis	Sotiris		Zoi^{6}	Chrysa^{6}	Giannis	Default^{7}					Marilina		Stamatis				Marilina				Evgenia	Chrysa		Marilina	Nikos R.	Giorgos P.	Giannis	Christoforos		Aira			Ioanna		Aira			Aira		Giorgos P.		Asimina	Giorgos P.	Christoforos			Giannis	Christoforos	Christoforos		Giorgos P.		Asimina			Asimina		Giorgos P.	Christoforos	Christoforos	Giorgos P.		Stamatis		Daniel			Stamatis			Stamatis		Stamatis			Daniel	Giorgos G.	Giorgos G.	Daniel	Eliminated
Voted for by...	Christoforos	Not competing yet																												Marilina						Aira		Nikos R.	Giorgos P.	Giannis	Giorgos G.		Aira			Ioanna		Aira			Aira		Dora		Asimina	Giorgos P.	Alexis			Giannis	Dora	Giorgos P.		Dora		Asimina			Asimina		Dora	Dora	Giorgos P.	Giorgos P.			Giorgos P.		Giorgos P.	Katerina		Katerina	Giorgos G.		Giorgos G.		Giorgos G.	Giorgos G.		Eliminated			
Voted for by...	Stamatis	Dora	Rob James	Andriana	Marilina			Rob James	Rob James			Dora	Rob James	Sotiris		Zoi^{6}	Rob James^{6}	Aira	Default^{7}					Aira		James				James				Evgenia	Chrysa		Marilina					Evgenia		Anastasia	Chrysa		Chrysa		Chrysa	Stavroula		Thodoris		Chrysa				James	Thodoris				Thodoris		Thodoris		Anastasia	Stavroula		Daniel					Daniel	Daniel		Daniel			Daniel			Dora		Daniel	Eliminated						
Voted for by...	Giorgos P.	Not competing yet																													Evgenia	Anastasia	Default	Evgenia	Chrysa		Marilina	Nikos R.	Giannis	Christoforos	Christoforos		Aira			Aira		Aira			Aira		Dora		Asimina	Christoforos	Christoforos			Giannis	Dora	Christoforos		Dora		Asimina			Asimina		Dora	Dora	Christoforos	Katerina			Christoforos		Katerina	Christoforos		Katerina	Eliminated										
Voted for by...	Stavroula	Not competing yet																						Marilina		Stamatis				Marilina				Evgenia	Marilina		Injured					Evgenia		Anastasia	Chrysa		Stamatis		Chrysa	Anastasia		Thodoris		Chrysa				Thodoris	Thodoris				-		Thodoris		Anastasia	Daniel		Stamatis				Walked																			
Voted for by...	Asimina					Paulos	Alexis			Kristi	Olga				Daniel					Zoi	Olga	Maria	Thodoris		Alexis		Elena	Maria	Default^{11}		Evgenia	Anastasia	Default			Aira		Nikos R.	Giorgos P.	Giannis	Christoforos		Aira			Ioanna		-			Aira		Dora		Katerina	Giorgos P.	Christoforos			Giannis	Dora	Christoforos		Giorgos P.		Christoforos			Dora		Dora	Eliminated																					
Voted for by...	Anastasia	Not competing yet																									Elena		Default^{11}		Evgenia	Maria	Default			Aira						Stamatis		Stavroula	Stavroula		Stamatis		Chrysa	Stavroula		Thodoris		Chrysa				James	-				Thodoris		Thodoris		Daniel	Evacuated																									
Voted for by...	Thodoris	Not competing yet																		Zoi	Olga	Maria	Olga		Alexis		Maria		Default^{11}		Evgenia	Anastasia	Default	Evgenia	Chrysa		Marilina					Evgenia		Anastasia	Chrysa		Daniel		Chrysa	Stavroula		Savvas		Stavroula				James	Stamatis				Stamatis		Stamatis		Anastasia	Eliminated																									
Voted for by...	Chrysa	Dora	Rob James	Andriana	Marilina			Rob James	Rob James			Dora	Rob James	Sotiris		Zoi^{6}	Rob James^{6}	Giannis	Default^{7}					Aira		Stamatis				Marilina				Evgenia	Marilina		Marilina					Evgenia		Anastasia	Stavroula		Stamatis		Anastasia	Anastasia		Thodoris		Anastasia				James	Thodoris				-	Walked																													
Voted for by...	Giannis	Dora	Rob James	Andriana	Marilina			Rob James	Dora			Dora	Rob James	Aira		Zoi^{6}	Aira^{6}	Aira	Default^{7}					Marilina		Stamatis				Marilina						Aira		Giorgos P.	Giorgos P.	Christoforos	Christoforos		Aira			Aira		Aira			Aira		Dora		Asimina	Christoforos	Christoforos			Dora	Dora	Christoforos		Eliminated																													
Voted for by...	Savvas					Paulos	Nikos G.			Kristi	Maria				Daniel					Zoi	Olga	Maria	Thodoris		Daniel		Elena		Default^{11}		Evgenia	Anastasia	Default	Evgenia	Marilina		Marilina					Evgenia		Anastasia	Chrysa		Thodoris		Chrysa	Stavroula		Thodoris		Chrysa				James	-			Evacuated																															
Voted for by...	Alexis					Christos	Christos			Kristi	Maria				Nikos G.					Zoi	Maria	Maria	Thodoris		Daniel		Elena		Default^{11}		Evgenia	Anastasia	Default			Aira		Nikos R.	Giorgos P.	Giannis	Christoforos		Aira			Ioanna		Aira			Aira		Dora		Asimina	Giorgos P.	Christoforos			Walked																																	
Voted for by...	James	Not competing yet																						Marilina		Stamatis				Marilina				Evgenia	Marilina		Injured					Evgenia		Anastasia	Chrysa		Stamatis		Chrysa	Anastasia		Thodoris		Chrysa				Thodoris	-	Eliminated																																	
Voted for by...	Aira	Not competing yet							Rob James			Chrysa	Rob James	Sotiris		Zoi^{6}	Giannis^{6}	Giannis	Default^{7}					Marilina		Stamatis				Marilina						Ioanna		Nikos R.	Giorgos P.	Giannis	Christoforos		Giorgos P.			Ioanna		Dora			Giorgos P.		Dora		Asimina	Eliminated																																					
Voted for by...	Ioanna	Dora	Rob James	Andriana	Chrysa			Rob James	Rob James			Dora	Rob James	Sotiris		Zoi^{6}	Rob James^{6}	Giannis	Default^{7}					Aira		James				Marilina						Aira		Nikos R.	Giorgos P.	Giannis	Christoforos		Aira			Aira		Aira			Eliminated																																										
Voted for by...	Evgenia	Not competing yet																									Elena		Default^{11}		Nikos R.	Maria	Default	Chrysa	Chrysa		Marilina					Daniel		Anastasia	Chrysa	Eliminated																																															
Voted for by...	Nikos R.	Not competing yet																									Elena		Default^{11}		Evgenia	Anastasia	Default			Aira		Aira	Giorgos P.	Christoforos	Christoforos	Eliminated																																																			
Voted for by...	Marilina	Dora	Rob James	Andriana	Chrysa			Rob James	Rob James			Dora	Rob James	Sotiris		Zoi^{6}	Rob James^{6}	Giannis	Default^{7}					Aira		James				James				Evgenia	Chrysa		Dora	Eliminated																																																							
Voted for by...	Pantelis^{12}	Not competing yet																												Marilina				Left (injury)^{12}																																																											
Voted for by...	Maria					Paulos	Alexis			Alexis	Olga				Alexis					Daniel	Olga	Asimina	Thodoris		Alexis		Elena	Daniel	Default^{11}		Evgenia	Anastasia	Default	Eliminated																																																											
Voted for by...	Elena	Not competing yet																		Zoi	Olga	Maria	Alexis		Alexis		Maria		Default^{11}	Eliminated																																																															
Voted for by...	Nikos G.					Paulos	Alexis			Alexis	Olga				Alexis					Savvas	Olga	Maria	Thodoris		Alexis		Eliminated																																																																		
Voted for by...	Olga^{9}					Paulos	Christos			Kristi	Maria				Nikos G.					Zoi	Maria	Maria	Thodoris		Daniel		Removed due to injury^{9}																																																																		
Voted for by...	Zoi	Not competing yet								Alexis	Olga				Alexis					Olga	Olga	Katerina	Eliminated																																																																						
Voted for by...	Kostas^{8}	Not competing yet																		Unwell^{8}	Removed for health issues^{8}																																																																								
Voted for by...	Rob James	Stamatis	Stamatis	Andriana	Marilina			Aggelos	Chrysa			Chrysa	Giannis	Sotiris		Zoi^{6}	Aira^{6}	Aira	Default^{7}	Eliminated																																																																									
Voted for by...	Aggelos^{3}	Chrysa	Rob James	Andriana	Marilina			Fanis	Chrysa			Unwell^{4}				Left^{4}																																																																													
Voted for by...	Sotiris	Not competing yet							Giannis			Chrysa	Fanis	Stamatis		Eliminated																																																																													
Voted for by...	Kristi					Paulos	Alexis			Alexis	Olga		Eliminated																																																																																
Voted for by...	Christos^{5}					Paulos	Alexis			Alexis	Maria		Left^{5}																																																																																
Voted for by...	Paulos					Nikos G.	Christos		Eliminated																																																																																				
Voted for by...	Andriana	Marilina	Stamatis	Ioanna	Chrysa	Eliminated																																																																																							
Nominated by Team Vote		Dora	~~Rob James~~^{1}	Andriana	Marilina^{1}	Paulos	Alexis	Rob James	~~Rob James~~^{1}	Kristi	Olga	Dora^{1}	Rob James	Sotiris	Alexis	~~Zoi~~^{6}	Rob James^{6}	Giannis	Fanis^{7}	Zoi	Olga	Maria	Thodoris	~~Marilina~~^{1}	Alexis	Stamatis^{1}	Elena	Maria	Katerina^{11}	Marilina	Evgenia	Anastasia	Maria	Evgenia	Chrysa	Aira	Marilina	Nikos R.	Giorgos P.	Giannis	Christoforos	Evgenia	Aira	Anastasia	Chrysa	Ioanna	~~Stamatis~~	Aira	Chrysa	Stavroula	Aira	~~Thodoris~~	Dora	Chrysa	Asimina	Giorgos P.	Christoforos	James	Thodoris	Giannis	Dora	Christoforos	Thodoris	Giorgos P.	Thodoris	Asimina	Anastasia	Stavroula	Asimina	Stamatis	Dora	Dora	Christoforos	Giorgos P.	Daniel	Stamatis	Christoforos	Daniel	Giorgos P.	Christoforos	Stamatis	Katerina	Christoforos	Dora	Giorgos G.	Stamatis	Christoforos	Giorgos G.	Dora	Dora	Giorgos G.	Daniel	
Vote Split		6-2-1-1	7-3	8-2	6-3	8-1-1	6-3-1	7-1-1	6-3-1-1	6-5	6-5	6-3-1	7-2-1	8-1-1	4-3-2	9-0^{6}	4-3-1-1^{6}	5-4	Default^{7}	8-1-1-1	9-2	9-1-1	8-1-1	7-4	6-4	8-3	8-2	≥6-1-?	Default^{11}	11-2	10-1	8-3	Default	10-1	6-5	10-1	8-1	9-2	10-1	7-4	10-1	8-1-1	9-1	9-1	7-3	6-4	6-2-1	8-1	8-1	6-3	8-1	8-1	8-1	7-1-1	8-1	6-2	7-1	7-2	5-1	6-1	6-1	6-1	4-1	4-2	5-1	5-1	5-1	3-1	5-1	3-1	5-1	3-2	4-1	4-1	2-1	3-1	3-1	3-1	3-1	3-1	3-1	3-1	2-1	3-1	2-1	3-1	2-1	2-1	2-1	3-1-1	3-2	3-2	
MVP		Asimina				Giannis			Katerina				Savvas			Katerina				Fanis			Ioanna				Katerina			Stavroula				Thodoris				James				Anastasia				Giorgos G.					Daniel					Fanis				Fanis				Fanis				Katerina				Fanis				Fanis				Giorgos G.			Giorgos G.				Fanis			Daniel	Fanis	Fanis	
Nominated by MVP		Ioanna				Nikos G.			Chrysa				Stamatis			N/A^{7}				Katerina			Nikos G.				Chrysa			N/A																																																															
Eliminated in Challenge		Andriana				Paulos			Kristi				Sotiris			Rob James				Zoi			Nikos G.				Elena			Maria				Marilina				Nikos R.				Evgenia				Ioanna					Aira					James				Giannis				Thodoris				Asimina				Dora				Giorgos P.				Giorgos P.			Stamatis				Christoforos			Dora			

^{1} The original nominee was rescued from the elimination challenge due to a mismatch with the other two nominees' gender group after the third vote determined a gender majority, so a fourth vote had to be cast to determine a substitute nominee from the majority gender group (see above explanation of elimination challenge process).

^{2} Fanis was unwell during episode 3, so did not compete and was not present in person for the vote. A vote was still cast on his behalf in the initial poll, but his absence meant that this proxy voting could not be repeated when it became necessary to run an additional vote due to Andriana's nomination removing Rob James from the elimination challenge for that week by creating a female majority (along with Dora).

^{3} New players joining midway through the competition are granted immunity in their first week. In week 3, the new joiners were Daniel, Zoi, Aira, and Sotiris. In week 6, they were James, Stavroula, Kostas, Elena, Thodoris, and Giorgos.

^{4} Aggelos was absent from episodes 11 to 16 due to the sudden onset of a health condition reportedly caused by exposure to toxic coral. Having still not fully recovered by episode 17 two weeks later, he opted to withdraw from the competition.

^{5} Christos voluntarily withdrew from the competition in episode 12 after expressing intense frustration with the conduct of Diasimoi members (and veteran Survivor competitors) Alexis and Asimina.

^{6} In episode 17, the entire team of nine Machites initially protest voted for Zoi from the Diasimoi due to a conflict over her conduct, each showing their votes to the camera and explaining their reasoning one by one. Since the voting team cannot nominate a member of the opposing team for elimination, a second vote was cast to nominate one of the Machites (Rob James, meaning that he had been nominated for elimination in all five weeks of the competition to date).

^{7} Stamatis did not compete in episode 18 due to injury, granting him immunity from elimination until medical advice deemed his injury sufficiently recovered for him to re-enter the competition. In addition to this, Marilina successfully convinced all of the women to vote for the same man (Giannis) in order to ensure that the women would stay out of the challenge, which was guaranteed to work as long as all of the women complied since there were five women and only four men. This was justified as a strategy to eliminate Rob James, but was heavily criticised by both teams. Consequently, the only remaining competitor from the Machites able to participate in the week 5 elimination challenge was Fanis, which could only be avoided if both remaining elimination nominees came from the Diasimoi in episode 19. The Machites lost the episode 19 immunity match, so Fanis had to join the elimination challenge by default (therefore there was no vote), which also meant that the Diasimoi MVP – Katerina – had nobody left to nominate from the Machites, so the elimination challenge went ahead with only three challengers.

^{8} Kostas only competed in one match in his first episode (episode 21) before being removed from the remainder of the episode's matches and, following on-site medical advice, taken to hospital. In episode 22, he was permanently removed from the competition and replaced by Giorgos.

^{9} Olga was suffering from a neck injury in episode 27 and was subsequently permanently removed from the competition on medical grounds in episode 28.

^{10} No-one revealed their own votes except for Maria and Daniel, and presenter Giorgos stopped revealing votes after six votes for Maria had been pulled out (there were only another four votes left of the total eleven, which could not create a majority for anyone else).

^{11} Asimina was injured in week 8 so did not compete and was immune from the votes. With Elena and Maria already nominated, the only remaining female Diasimoi member was Katerina, so no vote was required. Katerina was defaulted into the elimination challenge in the same episode she was nominated as MVP for week 8.

^{12} Pantelis did not return in episode 38, having left voluntarily after suffering from injuries since almost immediately after joining the game. Notably, in episode 34, the Diasimoi repeatedly nominated him for a total of five consecutive matches, knowing that he had sustained a shoulder injury.

== Ratings ==
Official ratings are taken from AGB Hellas.

Week	Episode	Air date	Timeslot (EET)	Ratings	Viewers (in millions)	Rank		Share		Source
Week	Episode	Air date	Timeslot (EET)	Ratings	Viewers (in millions)	Daily	Weekly	Household	Adults 18-54	Source
1	1	January 7, 2024	Sunday 9:00pm	11.5%	1.160	#1	#1	28.7%	24.1%	
1	2	January 8, 2024	Monday 9:00pm	9.8%	0.987	#1	#2	24.6%	21.7%	
1	3	January 9, 2024	Tuesday 9:00pm	8.3%	0.842	#1	#6	24.4%	20.6%	
1	4	January 10, 2024	Wednesday 9:00pm	8.4%	0.853	#1	#4	24.5%	19.7%	
2	5	January 14, 2024	Sunday 9:00pm	8.6%	0.868	#2	#3	20.9%	20%	
2	6	January 15, 2024	Monday 9:00pm	-	-	-	-	15.3%	12.8%	
2	7	January 16, 2024	Tuesday 9:00pm	6.2%	0.625	#8	-	16.3%	13.1%	
2	8	January 17, 2024	Wednesday 9:00pm	6.9%	0.694	#6	-	18.9%	16.6%	
3	9	January 21, 2024	Sunday 9:00pm	6.9%	0.697	#5	-	17.3%	14.1%	
3	10	January 22, 2024	Monday 9:00pm	6.8%	0.689	#9	-	17.5%	16.0%	
3	11	January 23, 2024	Tuesday 9:00pm	-	-	-	-	15.8%	15.0%	
3	12	January 24, 2024	Wednesday 9:00pm	6.4%	0.648	#7	-	17.2%	16.5%	
4	13	January 28, 2024	Sunday 9:00pm	7.1%	0.722	#3	-	17.3%	15.6%	
4	14	January 29, 2024	Monday 9:00pm	-	-	-	-	13.2%	12.1%	
4	15	January 30, 2024	Tuesday 9:00pm	-	-	-	-	12.4%	11.8%	
4	16	January 31, 2024	Wednesday 9:00pm	5.9%	0.594	#7	-	15.7%	13.4%	
5	17	February 4, 2024	Sunday 9:00pm	7.4%	0.752	#3	-	20.7%	17.2%	
5	18	February 5, 2024	Monday 9:00pm	6.2%	0.626	#9	-	15.2%	14.0%	
5	19	February 6, 2024	Tuesday 9:00pm	-	-	-	-	15.3%	14.6%	
5	20	February 7, 2024	Wednesday 9:00pm	5.9%	0.597	#10	-	15.6%	14.1%	
6	21	February 11, 2024	Sunday 9:00pm	8.8%	0.891	#2	#8	22.5%	19.5%	
6	22	February 12, 2024	Monday 9:00pm	7.2%	0.734	#4	#17	17.7%	16.4%	
6	23	February 13, 2024	Tuesday 9:00pm	6.5%	0.659	#8	-	16.6%	16.2%	
6	24	February 14, 2024	Wednesday 9:00pm	6.9%	0.702	#5	-	19.1%	15%	
7	25	February 18, 2024	Sunday 9:00pm	7.6%	0.767	#3	#12	20.6%	18.0%	
7	26	February 19, 2024	Monday 9:00pm	6.3%	0.639	#9	-	15.6%	13.5%	
7	27	February 20, 2024	Tuesday 9:00pm	6.4%	0.645	#8	-	16.1%	14.0%	
7	28	February 21, 2024	Wednesday 9:00pm	6.8%	0.689	#4	-	19.3%	15.7%	
8	29	February 25, 2024	Sunday 9:00pm	6.7%	0.681	#4	-	18.7%	16.3%	
8	30	February 26, 2024	Monday 9:00pm	6.4%	0.646	#8	-	16.0%	14.0%	
8	31	February 27, 2024	Tuesday 9:00pm	6.3%	0.642	#7	-	15.6%	14.0%	
8	32	February 28, 2024	Wednesday 9:00pm	5.7%	0.578	#9	-	16.3%	14.2%	
9	33	March 3, 2024	Sunday 9:00pm	6.3%	0.640	#4	-	16.8%	13.2%	
9	34	March 4, 2024	Monday 9:00pm	5.8%	0.585	#10	-	15.1%	11.8%	
9	35	March 5, 2024	Tuesday 9:00pm	5.7%	0.574	#10	-	15.7%	13.3%	
9	36	March 6, 2024	Wednesday 9:00pm	5.9%	0.599	#6	-	16.1%	12.9%	
9	37	March 7, 2024	Thursday 9:00pm	6.0%	0.604	#5	-	17.1%	14.7%	
10	38	March 10, 2024	Sunday 9:00pm	6.6%	0.665	#4	-	18.3%	15.2%	
10	39	March 11, 2024	Monday 9:00pm	5.7%	0.578	#10	-	14.9%	12.5%	
10	40	March 12, 2024	Tuesday 9:00pm	-	-	-	-	13.9%	10.6%	
10	41	March 13, 2024	Wednesday 9:00pm	5.5%	0.553	#9	-	14.8%	12.6%	
10	42	March 14, 2024	Thursday 9:00pm	5.4%	0.543	#7	-	15.1%	11.8%	
11	43	March 17, 2024	Sunday 9:00pm	5.4%	0.542	#4	-	16.3%	12.2%	
11	44	March 18, 2024	Monday 9:00pm	5.4%	0.543	#10	-	15.0%	10.5%	
11	45	March 19, 2024	Tuesday 9:00pm	-	-	-	-	14.8%	11.5%	
11	46	March 20, 2024	Wednesday 9:00pm	5.9%	0.595	#8	-	16.9%	14.5%	
11	47	March 21, 2024	Thursday 9:00pm	5.8%	0.590	#5	-	16.5%	12.6%	
12	48	March 24, 2024	Sunday 9:00pm	6.0%	0.609	#3	-	16.1%	12.7%	
12	49	March 25, 2024	Monday 9:00pm	5.9%	0.595	#8	-	15.5%	13.9%	
12	50	March 26, 2024	Tuesday 9:00pm	5.2%	0.527	#8	-	13.7%	10.5%	
12	51	March 27, 2024	Wednesday 9:00pm	5.3%	0.540	#8	-	14.9%	12.4%	
12	52	March 28, 2024	Thursday 9:00pm	5.8%	0.589	#7	-	17.2%	12.0%	
13	53	March 31, 2024	Sunday 9:00pm	6.3%	0.633	#3	-	18.0%	14.3%	
13	54	April 1, 2024	Monday 9:00pm	5.9%	0.597	#7	-	15.5%	12.8%	
13	55	April 2, 2024	Tuesday 9:00pm	5.7%	0.574	#8	-	15.3%	13.0%	
13	56	April 3, 2024	Wednesday 9:00pm	5.5%	0.554	#7	-	14.8%	11.9%	
13	57	April 4, 2024	Thursday 9:00pm	5.7%	0.581	#5	-	16.2%	12.5%	
14	58	April 7, 2024	Sunday 9:00pm	6.1%	0.616	#4	-	16.2%	12.5%	
14	59	April 8, 2024	Monday 9:00pm	5.6%	0.565	#8	-	15.4%	13.1%	
14	60	April 9, 2024	Tuesday 9:00pm	5.4%	0.551	#9	-	14.8%	11.3%	
14	61	April 10, 2024	Wednesday 9:00pm	6.2%	0.629	#5	-	16.8%	13.8%	
14	62	April 11, 2024	Thursday 9:00pm	5.9%	0.595	#3	-	16.5%	11.5%	
15	63	April 14, 2024	Sunday 9:00pm	6.5%	0.653	#3	#19	20.8%	17.5%	
15	64	April 15, 2024	Monday 9:00pm	5.2%	0.528	#7	-	13.3%	11.3%	
15	65	April 16, 2024	Tuesday 9:00pm	5.6%	0.571	#4	-	14.9%	13.3%	
15	66	April 17, 2024	Wednesday 9:00pm	5.7%	0.578	#7	-	15.0%	12.0%	
15	67	April 18, 2024	Thursday 9:00pm	5.7%	0.578	#5	-	16.7%	12.5%	
16	68	April 21, 2024	Sunday 9:00pm	6.0%	0.605	#4	-	16.0%	13.4%	
16	69	April 22, 2024	Monday 9:00pm	5.4%	0.547	#8	-	14.6%	11.6%	
16	70	April 23, 2024	Tuesday 9:00pm	5.5%	0.561	#8	-	16.0%	12.0%	
16	71	April 24, 2024	Wednesday 9:00pm	5.0%	0.510	#6	-	14.3%	10.8%	
16	72	April 25, 2024	Thursday 9:00pm	5.7%	0.582	#6	-	17.0%	12.6%	
17	73	April 28, 2024	Sunday 9:00pm	5.4%	0.551	#3	-	15.8%	13.1%	
17	74	April 29, 2024	Monday 9:00pm	5.2%	0.527	#5	#18	14.6%	11.9%	
17	75	April 30, 2024	Tuesday 9:00pm	5.0%	0.509	#6	-	14.1%	11.9%	
17	76	May 1, 2024	Wednesday 9:00pm	5.3%	0.536	#4	#17	15.9%	11.2%	
17	77	May 2, 2024	Thursday 9:00pm	6.2%	0.624	#1	#10	19.9%	14.8%	
18	78	May 5, 2024	Sunday 9:00pm	5.3%	0.538	#1	#16	18.7%	11.4%	
18	79	May 6, 2024	Monday 9:00pm	6.0%	0.603	#1	#20	19.6%	12.3%	
18	80	May 7, 2024	Tuesday 9:00pm	5.8%	0.583	#4	-	15.9%	9.8%	
18	81	May 8, 2024	Wednesday 9:00pm	5.6%	0.567	#5	-	15.9%	10.8%	
18	82	May 9, 2024	Thursday 9:00pm	5.5%	0.553	#6	-	14.1%	8.2%	
19	83	May 12, 2024	Sunday 9:00pm	5.6%	0.566	#3	-	15.6%	12.4%	
19	84	May 13, 2024	Monday 9:00pm	5.7%	0.577	#6		14.9%	12.4%	
19	85	May 14, 2024	Tuesday 9:00pm	5.7%	0.572	#6		15.6%	13.2%	
19	86	May 15, 2024	Wednesday 9:00pm	4.8%	0.490	#7		14.2%	12.4%	
19	87	May 16, 2024	Thursday 9:00pm	5.7%	0.574	#6		16.3%	11.4%	
20	88	May 19, 2024	Sunday 9:00pm	5.0%	0.506	#4		14.0%	10.3%	
20	89	May 20, 2024	Monday 9:00pm	4.9%	0.493	#8		13.8%	11.3%	
20	90	May 21, 2024	Tuesday 9:00pm	4.7%	0.471	#8		13.2%	10.6%	
20	91	May 22, 2024	Wednesday 9:00pm	4.9%	0.496	#8		13.4%	11.0%	
20	92	May 23, 2024	Thursday 9:00pm	5.2%	0.523	#7		14.6%	9.8%	
21	93	May 26, 2024	Sunday 9:00pm	4.9%	0.492	#4		13.9%	12%	
21	94	May 27, 2024	Monday 9:00pm	-	-	-	-	10.5%	8.7%	
21	95	May 28, 2024	Tuesday 9:00pm	4.8%	0.482	#8		13.1%	10.1%	
21	96	May 29, 2024	Wednesday 9:00pm	-	-	-	-	8%	5.7%	
21	97	May 30, 2024	Thursday 9:00pm	4.9%	0.496	#8		14.4%	12.1%	
22	98	June 2, 2024	Sunday 9:00pm	4.8%	0.489	#5		14.2%	11%	
22	99	June 3, 2024	Monday 9:00pm	-	-	-	-	10.4%	9.1%	
22	100	June 4, 2024	Tuesday 9:00pm	4.1%	0.418	#9	-	14.2%	8.2%	
22	101	June 5, 2024	Wednesday 9:00pm	-	-	-	-	9.4%	7.7%	
22	102	June 6, 2024	Thursday 9:00pm	4.4%	0.444	#8	-	12.1%	11.2%	
23	103	June 10, 2024	Monday 9:00pm	-	-	-	-	11.5%	8.8%	
23	104	June 11, 2024	Tuesday 9:00pm	-	-	-	-	10.6%	8.9%	
23	105	June 12, 2024	Wednesday 9:00pm	-	-	-	-	10.2%	7.2%	
23	106	June 13, 2024	Thursday 9:00pm	-	-	-	-	11.5%	9.3%	
23	107	June 14, 2024	Friday 9:00pm	4.1%	0.412	#9	-	12.6%	9.9%	
24	108	June 16, 2024	Sunday 9:00pm	4.8%	0.491	#5	-	15%	10.2%	
24	109	June 17, 2024	Monday 9:00pm	-	-	-	-	10.5%	9.4%	
24	110	June 18, 2024	Tuesday 9:00pm	-	-	-	-	10.6%	8.4%	
24	111	June 19, 2024	Wednesday 9:00pm	-	-	-	-	10.8%	7.2%	
24	112	June 20, 2024	Thursday 9:00pm	-	-	-	-	10.5%	7%	
25	113	June 23, 2024	Sunday 9:00pm	3.5%	0.350	#7	-	13.8%	8.7%	
25	114	June 24, 2024	Monday 9:00pm	3.8%	0.384	#10	-	11.7%	8%	
25	115	June 25, 2024	Tuesday 9:00pm	4.9%	0.498	#7	-	16.6%	12.1%	SEMI- FINAL
25	116	June 26, 2024	Wednesday 9:00pm	5.2%	0.528	#6	-	17.6%	16.3%	FINAL
