= Survivor Greece (2017) =

- Presented by: Sakis Tanimanidis
- No. of days: 148
- No. of castaways: 25
- Winner: Giorgos Aggelopoulos
- Runner-up: Marios Priamos Ioannidis
- Location: Las Terrenas, Samaná, Dominican Republic
- No. of episodes: 90

Release
- Original network: Skai TV
- Original release: February 13 – July 5, 2017

Additional information
- Filming dates: February 8 – July 5, 2017

Season chronology
- ← Previous; Season 4 Next → Season 6

Survivor 2017 was the fifth season of Survivor Greece, the Greek version of the popular reality show Survivor. The Game started airing on Skai TV on February 13, 2017 in Greece and in Cyprus it started airing the same day on Sigma TV. It is also being broadcast abroad via SKAI's international stations. It is hosted by Sakis Tanimanidis and two episodes were hosted by the Turkish producer of the Greek version of Survivor, Acun Ilıcalı.

Twelve players and twelve celebrities have been known in Greece through their work are invited to survive on a deserted island, the exotic Dominican Republic, for 5 months, having their luggage, the necessary clothes and basic food supply. On episode 77, the last team match took place and on episode 78, individual matches started. Immunity matches after episode 80 will be held twice a week. Also, the tribe merge held in episode 44, but individual matches started in episode 78. The Finals were held on 3, 4 & 5 July live in the open theatre of Alsos Veikou, Galatsi, Athens. The winner of season five was Giorgos Angelopoulos from the team "Celebrities" (Διάσημοι).

== Contestants ==
The names of the original tribes were Mαχητές (Machites, meaning warriors), and Διάσημοι (Diasimoi, meaning celebrities). On Second week Willie joined Machites team.

List of Survivor Greece 2017 contestants
Contestant	Original tribe	Switched tribe	Merged tribe	Personal Statistics	Finish
Dimitris Paschoulas; 24, Naousa, Unemployed	Machites	Machites		66%	Walked; Episode 4
Marianna Kalergi; 24, Muay Thai Fighter	Diasimoi	Diasimoi		50%	1st Voted Out; Episode 4
Irini Ainatzioglou; 23, Athens, Student, Model	Machites	Machites		0%	2nd Voted Out; Episode 8
Elisavet Dobliatidou; 24, Thessaloniki, Model	Machites	Machites		36%	3rd Voted Out; Episode 12
Willie Kalvourtzis; 35, Thessaloniki, Speech Therapist	Machites	Machites		30%	4th Voted Out; Episode 16
Eleni Darra; 32, Patras, Gymnast	Machites	Machites		38%	5th Voted Out; Episode 21
Sofi Paschali; 41, Gymnast	Diasimoi	Diasimoi		54%	6th Voted Out; Episode 26
Eirini Kolida; 34, Athens, Personal Trainer	Machites	Machites		66%	Evacuated; Episode 31
Panos Argianidis; 35, Athens, Rugby Manager	Machites	Machites		48%	7th Voted Out; Episode 36
Stelios Chantabakis; 31, Presenter, Model	Diasimoi	Diasimoi		57%	8th Voted Out; Episode 39
Eirini Papadopoulou; 31, Singer	Diasimoi	Diasimoi		66%	Walked; Episode 40
Lampros Choutos; 37, Former football player	Diasimoi	Diasimoi		50%	9th Voted Out; Episode 42
Orestis Chang; 27, Thessaloniki, Entrepreneur	Machites	Machites		44%	10th Voted Out; Episode 50
Laura Narjes; 26, TV Presenter	Diasimoi	Diasimoi		34%	11th Voted Out; Episode 54
Elisavet Ainatzioglou; 23, Student, Model	Machites	Machites		40%	12th Voted Out; Episode 58
Kostas Kokkinakis; 41, Water polo player	Diasimoi	Diasimoi		41%	13th Voted Out; Episode 68
Charalambos "Bo" Xenidis; 43, Rapper	Diasimoi	Diasimoi		35%	14th Voted Out; Episode 72
Giorgos Chraniotis; 43, Actor	Diasimoi	Diasimoi		46%	15th Voted Out; Episode 76
Sara Eskenazi; 29, Athens, Actress	Machites	Machites	Merged Tribe	45%	16th Voted Out; Episode 80
Evridiki Valavani; 29, Sports Journalist	Diasimoi	Diasimoi	Merged Tribe	54%	17th Voted Out; Episode 82
Giannis Spaliaras; 41, Actor, model	Diasimoi	Machites	Merged Tribe	31%	18th Voted Out; Episode 85
Kostas Anagnostopoulos; 32, Athens, Ex-Mercenary	Machites	Machites	Merged Tribe	54%	Quarter-Final; Episode 86
Konstantinos Vasalos; 27, Athens, Personal trainer	Machites	Machites	Merged Tribe	54%	Semi-Final; Episode 87
Marios Priamos Ioannidis; 30, Nicosia, Cyprus, Scuba diving instructor	Machites	Machites	Merged Tribe	59%	Runner Up; Episode 88
Giorgos Agelopoulos; 35, Skiathos, Gas Station Operative	Machites	Diasimoi	Merged Tribe	61%	Sole Survivor; Episode 88

== Voting history ==
=== Nominations table ===
	Original tribes																				Merged Tribe		
Episode #	1	4	4	8	12	16	21	26	31	33	36	39	40	42	50	54	58	68	72	76	80	82	85
Tribe	Machites	Machites	Diasimoi	Machites	Machites	Machites	Machites	Diasimoi	Machites	Diasimoi	Machites	Diasimoi	Diasimoi	Diasimoi	Machites	Diasimoi	Machites	Diasimoi	Diasimoi	Diasimoi	Merge		
Immunity	No one	No one	Kokkinakis & Stelios	Orestis & Panos	Orestis & Konstantinos	Orestis & Sara	Orestis & Marios	Evridiki & Chraniotis	Anagnostopoulos & Marios	No one	Orestis & Elisavet	Papadopoulou & Evridiki	No one	Chraniotis & Bo	Anagnostopoulos & Konstantinos	Danos & Chraniotis	Anagnostopoulos & Marios	Chraniotis	Danos	Evridiki	Konstantinos & Marios	Anagnostopoulos & Marios	Marios & Danos
Nominated by Immune	No one	No one	Lampros & Sofi	Elisavet & Anagnostopoulos	Elisavet & Eleni	Willie & Kolida	Elisavet & Eleni	Danos & Sofi	Panos & Sara	No one	Anagnostopoulos & Konstantinos	Stelios & Chraniotis	No one	Kokkinakis & Lampros	Elisavet & Orestis	Kokkinakis & Evridiki	Sara & Elisavet	Bo	Chraniotis	No one	Danos & Sara	Evridiki & Danos	No one
Nominated by Group	Danos	No one	Marianna	Irini	Dobliatidou	Elisavet	Panos	Giannis	Elisavet & Orestis	Giannis	Panos	Danos	No one	Danos & Laura	Giannis	Laura & Bo	Giannis	Kokkinakis	Evridiki & Bo	No one	Evridiki & Giannis	Giannis	No one
Nominated	-	-	Marianna, Lampros & Sofi	Irini, Elisavet & Anagnostopoulos	Dobliatidou, Elisavet & Eleni	Elisavet, Willie & Kolida	Panos, Elisavet & Eleni	Giannis, Danos & Sofi	Elisavet, Orestis, Panos & Sara	-	Panos, Anagnostopoulos & Konstantinos	Danos, Stelios & Chraniotis	-	Danos, Laura, Kokkinakis & Lampros	Giannis, Elisavet & Orestis	Laura, Bo, Kokkinakis & Evridiki	Giannis, Sara & Elisavet	Kokkinakis & Bo	Evridiki, Bo & Chraniotis	Chraniotis & Danos	Evridiki, Giannis, Danos & Sara	Giannis, Evridiki & Danos	Konstantinos, Giannis & Anagnostopoulos
Votes	8/13	Walked	5/12	6/11	6/11	5/10	0/9	3/11	Vote Cancelled*	4(5)/10	4/7	1/9	Walked	0/7	0/7	3/6	1/6	3/5	2/4	The player eliminated directly through the public vote	1/7	2/6	The player eliminated directly through the public vote
Eliminated	Change Tribe	Dimitris; Walked	Marianna; Fewest votes by public to save	Irini; Fewest votes by public to save	Dobliatidou; Fewest votes by public to save	Willie; Fewest votes by public to save	Eleni; Fewest votes by public to save	Sofi; Fewest votes by public to save	Kolida; Evacuated	Change Tribe	Panos; Fewest votes by public to save	Stelios; Fewest votes by public to save	Papadopoulou; Walked	Lampros; Fewest votes by public to save	Orestis; Fewest votes by public to save	Laura; Fewest votes by public to save	Elisavet; Fewest votes by public to save	Kokkinakis; Fewest votes by public to save	Bo; Fewest votes by public to save	Chraniotis; Fewest votes by public to save	Sara; Fewest votes by public to save	Evridiki; Fewest votes by public to save	Giannis; Fewest votes by public to save
Voter	Vote																						
Agelopoulos	Elisavet		Sofi					Sofi		Laoura		Stelios		Laoura		Laoura		Kokkinakis	Bo	-	Sara	Giannis	-
Marios	Danos			Irini	Dobliatidou	Elisavet	Elisavet		Elisavet		Evacuated				Giannis		Giannis				Giannis	Giannis	-
Konstantinos	Danos			Irini	Dobliatidou	Elisavet	Elisavet		Elisavet		Sara				Giannis		Giannis				Giannis	Giannis	-
Anagnostopoulos	Danos			Dobliatidou	Panos	Willie	Panos		Orestis		Panos				Giannis		Giannis				Evridiki	Evridiki	-
Giannis			Sofi					Sofi		Laoura	Panos				Elisavet		Elisavet				Evridiki	Evridiki	-
Evridiki			Lampros					Giannis		Giannis		Danos		Danos		Bo		Bo	Bo	-	Giannis	Giannis	Eliminated
Sara	Danos			Eleni	Panos	Panos	Panos		Orestis		Panos				Giannis		Giannis				Evridiki	Eliminated	
Chraniotis			Marianna					Sofi		Papadopoulou		Kokkinakis		Laoura		Laoura		Kokkinakis	Evridiki	-	Eliminated		
Bo			Evridiki					Giannis		Giannis		Danos		Danos		Laoura		Kokkinakis	Evridiki	Eliminated			
Kokkinakis			Bo					Giannis		Papadopoulou		Chraniotis		Laoura		Bo		Bo	Eliminated				
Elisavet	Danos			Eleni	Panos	Willie	Panos		Orestis		Panos				Giannis		Giannis	Eliminated					
Laoura			Giannis					Giannis		Giannis		Danos		Kokkinakis		Bo	Eliminated						
Orestis	Irini A.			Irini	Dobliatidou	Elisavet	Elisavet		Elisavet		Sara				Giannis	Eliminated							
Lampros			Marianna					Giannis		Giannis		Danos		Danos	Eliminated								
Papadopoulou			Marianna					Giannis		Stelios		Bo		Walked									
Stelios			Marianna					Giannis		Giannis		Danos	Eliminated										
Panos	Danos			Irini	Dobliatidou	Elisavet	Elisavet		Elisavet		Sara	Eliminated											
Kolida	Danos			Eleni	Panos	Panos	Panos		Orestis	Walked													
Sofi			Marianna					Giannis	Eliminated														
Eleni	Dimitris			Irini	Dobliatidou	Willie	Panos	Eliminated															
Willie	Not in the game			Enter	Dobliatidou	Elisavet	Eliminated																
Dobliatidou	Orestis			Irini	Panos	Eliminated																	
Irini	Danos			Eleni	Eliminated																		
Marianna			Lampros	Eliminated																			
Dimitris	Anagnostopoulos	Walked																					

-The vote was canceled due to Irini Kolida's injury

=== Results of the finals ===
Color key
Result details

- Player was proclaimed as the Winner by the public
- Player was proclaimed as the Runner-Up by the public
- Player was saved by the public
- Two Players won immunity in episodes 84 and 85 & passed directly to the Semi-Final
- Player was eliminated by the public
- Player was eliminated

Finals
Episode #	86 (Quarter Final)	87 (Semi Final)	88 (Final)
Date	3/7/2017	4/7/2017	5/7/2017
Saved	Konstantinos; 78,3%	Giorgos A. 42%	Giorgos A. Winner; 72%
Saved	Konstantinos; 78,3%	Marios; 36%	Giorgos A. Winner; 72%
Eliminated	Kostas A. 21,7%	Konstantinos; 22%	Marios; Runner-Up; 28%
Players	Public Vote		
Giorgos A.	Won immunity	Saved by the public	Most votes by the public to win Winner
Marios	Won immunity	Saved by the public	Fewest votes by the public to win Runner-Up
Konstantinos	Saved by the public	Eliminated by the public 3rd Place	Eliminated
Kostas A.	Eliminated by the public 4th Place	Eliminated	

== Team matches ==
Episode	Winner	Score	Notes
1	Machites	10-8	
2	Diasimoi	10-6	
3	Machites	10-9	Immunity Game
4	Diasimoi	10-4	
5	Machites	10-5	
6	Diasimoi	10-8	Immunity Game
7	Diasimoi	10-5	
8	Diasimoi	10-7	
9	Diasimoi	10-8	
10	Diasimoi	10-9	Immunity Game
11	Diasimoi	10-4	
12	Machites	10-6	
13	Diasimoi	10-6	
14	Diasimoi	10-3	Immunity Game
15	Diasimoi	10-7	
16	Machites	10-1	
17	Machites	10-6	
18	Diasimoi	10-8	Immunity Game
19	Diasimoi	10-3	
20	Diasimoi	10-7	
21	Machites	10-3	
22	Machites	10-8	
23	Machites	10-4	Immunity Game
24	Machites	10-9	
25	Machites	10-9	
26	Machites	10-6	
27	Machites	10-6	
28	Diasimoi	10-6	Immunity Game
29	Diasimoi	10-3	
30	Diasimoi	10-9	
31		—N/a	Because of an accident, the game didn't take place.
32	Diasimoi	10-9	
33	Diasimoi	10-5	
34	Diasimoi	10-9	Immunity Game
35	Machites	10-4	
36	Diasimoi	10-7	
37 (Quiz)	Diasimoi	10-7	
37	Machites	10-6	Immunity Game
38	Diasimoi	10-8	
39	Machites	10-7	
40	Machites	10-7	Immunity Game
41	Machites	10-4	
42	Machites	10-8	
43	Machites	10-6	
44		—N/a	A party was held to celebrate the Merge of the tribes and a match didn't take place.
45	Diasimoi	10-8	
46	Machites	10-8	
47	Machites	10-5	
48	Diasimoi	10-1	Immunity Game
49	Diasimoi	10-4	
50	Machites	10-6	
51	Machites	10-9	
52	Machites	10-3	Immunity Game
53	Diasimoi	10-9	
54	Diasimoi	10-8	
55	Machites	10-7	
56	Diasimoi	10-3	Immunity Game
57	Diasimoi	10-7	
58	Machites	10-5	
59		—N/a	In these episodes, a friendly match hosted between Greek and Turkish players of Survivor took place.
60		—N/a	In these episodes, a friendly match hosted between Greek and Turkish players of Survivor took place.
61	Machites	10-7	
62	Diasimoi	10-7	
63	Machites	10-9	
64	Diasimoi	10-8	
65	Machites	10-5	
66	Machites	10-9	Immunity Game
67	Machites	10-2	
68	Diasimoi	10-5	
69	Diasimoi	10-4	
70	Diasimoi	10-7	
71	Machites	10-6	
72	Machites	10-8	Immunity Game
73	Machites	10-7	
74	Diasimoi	10-7	
75	Diasimoi	10-8	
76	Machites	10-6	Immunity Game
77	Diasimoi	10-6	Last Team Match

== Individual matches ==
In the individual matches, the winner has the ability to choose two players to enjoy the reward with him/her, except the immunities.

Episode	Winner	Lives/Points	Notes
78	Giorgos A.	1/5 Lives	
79	Marios	1/5 Lives	
80	Konstantinos	Winner: 5/6 Points (Konstantinos); Runner-Up: 4/6 Points (Marios)	The winner and the runner-up who have won the immunity must choose two of four candidates who may leave the game.
81	Kostas A.	1/5 Lives	The winner who won the immunity must choose one of three candidates who may leave the game.
82	Marios	5/5 Lives	The winner who won the immunity must choose one of three candidates who may leave the game.
83 (Quiz)	Konstantinos	11/15 Points (1st Round) & 3-2 against Kostas A. (2nd Round)	The winner won a car.
84	Marios	1/6 Lives	The winner won the immunity and is one of the three players who will play in the semi-final in Greece.
85	Giorgos A.	2/6 Lives	The winner won the immunity and is one of the three players who will play in the semi-final in Greece. It's also the last match of this season.

== Finals ==
Episode	Winner	Notes
86	Giorgos A. Marios	Giorgos A. and Marios won the immunity and qualify to the semifinal.
87	Konstantinos; ~~Kostas~~	Konstantinos and Kostas who didn't win the immunity, went through the public vote to qualify to the Semi-final. Konstantinos qualified and Kostas was eliminated.
87	Giorgos A. Marios; ~~Konstantinos~~	At the Semifinal the last three contestants went through public vote and the two would qualify to the grand final. Giorgos A. and Marios qualified and Konstantinos was eliminated.
88	Giorgos Aggelopoulos	At the Final, Giorgos Aggelopoulos was named Sole Survivor 2017. Season finale

== Ratings ==
Episode	Date	Ratings	Share	S15-44	Viewers (in millions)
1	13/2/2017	12.2%	27.3%	33.5%	1.269
2	14/2/2017	11.9%	23.5%	27.1%	1.239
3	15/2/2017	11.7%	24.4%	30.4%	1.213
4	17/2/2017	12.7%	30.0%	36.2%	1.318
5	19/2/2017	12.5%	28.4%	37.9%	1.302
6	20/2/2017	11.9%	29.9%	40.4%	1.232
7	21/2/2017	12.9%	29.8%	39.2%	1.339
8	22/2/2017	13.1%	31.5%	42.6%	1.364
9	26/2/2017	12.4%	32.2%	39.8%	1.284
10	27/2/2017	16.2%	37.7%	47.0%	1.684
11	28/2/2017	16.4%	37.8%	51.6%	1.707
12	1/3/2017	16.5%	39.1%	56.1%	1.711
13	5/3/2017	14.9%	34.8%	48.3%	1.544
14	6/3/2017	15.6%	36.0%	50.0%	1.625
15	7/3/2017	16.7%	39.2%	55.6%	1.738
16	8/3/2017	16.2%	36.4%	49.7%	1.683
17	12/3/2017	17.5%	39.0%	52.5%	1.818
18	13/3/2017	18.1%	42.2%	57.7%	1.878
19	14/3/2017	18.2%	42.6%	59.2%	1.89
20	15/3/2017	18.0%	40.5%	57.6%	1.865
21	16/3/2017	17.4%	39.2%	57.7%	1.809
22	19/3/2017	19.3%	42.6%	58.0%	2.005
23	20/3/2017	18.7%	42.0%	57.7%	1.941
24	21/3/2017	19.9%	46.8%	63.6%	2.07
25	22/3/2017	19.2%	45.5%	62.0%	1.998
26	23/3/2017	19.5%	43.1%	60.4%	2.024
27	26/3/2017	20.1%	42.9%	55.0%	2.089
28	27/3/2017	20.9%	46.6%	64.6%	2.172
29	28/3/2017	19.9%	44.2%	59.7%	2.068
30	29/3/2017	20.6%	45.6%	60.6%	2.141
31	30/3/2017	19.7%	41.5%	61.6%	2.049
32	2/4/2017	19.6%	42.8%	54.7%	2.039
33	3/4/2017	19.2%	44.4%	58.8%	1.99
34	4/4/2017	20.0%	48.0%	65.0%	2.074
35	5/4/2017	18.7%	45.0%	61.5%	1.939
36	6/4/2017	19.4%	45.9%	63.2%	2.016
37	9/4/2017	19.0%	44.1%	56.8%	1.976
38	10/4/2017	20.0%	47.8%	61.9%	2.076
39	11/4/2017	19.3%	48.4%	64.7%	2.002
40	18/4/2017	20.9%	51.4%	64.6%	2.173
41	19/4/2017	19.5%	47.1%	64.1%	2.021
42	20/4/2017	20.2%	48.4%	60.9%	2.102
43	23/4/2017	18.1%	41.9%	55.8%	1.884
44	24/4/2017	23.6%	55.5%	72.9%	2.449
45	25/4/2017	20.4%	48.1%	66.0%	2.116
46	26/4/2017	19.5%	47.9%	61.7%	2.024
47	30/4/2017	17.5%	46.1%	57.5%	1.818
48	1/5/2017	21.4%	50.7%	62.5%	2.219
49	2/5/2017	19.2%	44.9%	57.4%	1.999
50	3/5/2017	19.8%	48.0%	60.3%	2.057
51	7/5/2017	20.2%	49.8%	62.2%	2.097
52	8/5/2017	20.1%	50.7%	63.3%	2.087
53	9/5/2017	21.1%	47.7%	59.4%	2.194
54	10/5/2017	19.3%	45.8%	58.7%	2.002
55	14/5/2017	19.4%	46.9%	58.5%	2.015
56	15/5/2017	20.6%	49.8%	61.4%	2.136
57	16/5/2017	20.1%	48.1%	63.2%	2.083
58	17/5/2017	20.1%	48.4%	60.3%	2.09
59	18/5/2017	21.5%	49.4%	60.4%	2.229
60	19/5/2017	21.5%	50.7%	60.0%	2.235
61	21/5/2017	18.3%	42.9%	53.3%	1.905
62	22/5/2017	21.5%	50.7%	59.2%	2.173
63	23/5/2017	21.7%	52.9%	65.4%	2.255
64	24/5/2017	19.8%	47.7%	59.3%	2.053
65	28/5/2017	22.2%	51.4%	60.8%	2.309
66	29/5/2017	21.8%	49.9%	62.6%	2.268
67	30/5/2017	21.2%	49.5%	62.3%	2.204
68	31/5/2017	19.6%	47.7%	58.3%	2.038
69	4/6/2017	17.1%	47.4%	57.3%	1.774
70	5/6/2017	18.7%	47.4%	57.3%	1.941
71	6/6/2017	18.9%	46.3%	59.0%	1.961
72	7/6/2017	20.5%	52.7%	64.2%	2.128
73	11/6/2017	19.5%	49.1%	56.8%	2.028
74	12/6/2017	19.5%	47.6%	60.8%	2.026
75	13/6/2017	18.1%	46.3%	58.5%	1.881
76	14/6/2017	20.2%	50.7%	64.2%	2.095
77	18/6/2017	21.3%	51.4%	60.5%	2.21
78	19/6/2017	21.0%	52.8%	65.6%	2.176
79	20/6/2017	20.6%	51.1%	64.2%	2.135
80	21/6/2017	21.4%	55.3%	65.9%	2.227
81	25/6/2017	18.9%	52.3%	60.2%	1.961
82	26/6/2017	19.1%	53.3%	62.7%	1.979
83	27/6/2017	20.0%	56.0%	63.4%	2.079
84	28/6/2017	19.1%	52.3%	60.2%	1.98
85	2/7/2017	18.3%	52.3%	62.4%	1.905
86	3/7/2017	17.9%	52.1%	60.6%	1.86
87	4/7/2017	21.0%	57.6%	68.4%	2.179
88	5/7/2017	21.8%	60.7%	70.6%	2.268
