= Survivor Greece 1 =

- Season 1
- Presented by: Grigoris Arnaoutoglou
- No. of days: 42
- No. of castaways: 17
- Winner: Evagelina Dermetzoglou
- Runner-up: Nikos Lamprinakis
- Location: Mensirip Island, Besar Island, Johor
- No. of episodes: 29

Release
- Original release: September 2003 – December 2003

Season chronology
- Next → Season 2

Survivor 1 was the first edition of the Greek version of the popular reality show Survivor and it aired from September 2003 to December 2003.

This season being the inaugural season of Survivor in Greece did not involve many twists; however, there were a few notable twists that did occur. The first of these twists occurred in the second episode cycle in which North team member Elias Valasis and South team member Nikos Lamprinakis swapped tribes. In this same episode cycle, Eugenia Katsarou entered the game and joined the South team following their win at the second reward challenge. All three of the contestants previously mentioned had immunity at their tribes first tribal council after the second immunity challenge. When the merge came, the two teams initially stuck with their former tribe members and voted against their former opponents; however, as time went on alliances were made within teams. The most powerful of these alliances was that of the trio Evagelina Dermetzoglou, Nikos Lamprinakis, and Orthoula Papdaki, who controlled the later stages of the game and ultimately made up the final three. When it came time for the final three they competed in two challenges in order to decide who would be in the final two. Eventually, it was Evagelina Dermetzoglou who won the season over Nikos Lamprinakis with a jury vote of 8-0.

== Finishing order ==
Contestant	Original Tribes	Episode Cycle 2 Tribes	Merged Tribe	Finish
Rena Dimitriou; 40, Xanthi	South Team			Walked; Day 2
Sandra Boura; 60, Nafplio	North Team			1st Voted Out
Giannis Veronis; 60, Mykonos	South Team	South Team		2nd Voted Out
Thodoros Sfantos; 46, Crete	South Team	South Team		3rd Voted Out
Dimitris Katranis; 33, Athens	North Team	North Team		4th Voted Out
Eugenia Katsarou; 24, Athens		South Team		5th Voted Out
Konstantinos Sotiriou; 32, Athens	North Team	North Team		6th Voted Out
Efimia Fakatseli; 29, Athens	North Team	North Team	Robinson	7th Voted Out; 1st Jury Member
Maria Solonaki; 24, Thessaloniki	South Team	South Team	Robinson	8th Voted Out; 2nd Jury Member
Katerina Darmi; 24, Athens	South Team	South Team	Robinson	Left Competition; 3rd Jury Member
Andreas Nasioudis; 25, Thessaloniki	South Team	South Team	Robinson	9th Voted Out; 4th Jury Member
Elias Valasis; 32, No permanent residence	North Team	South Team	Robinson	10th Voted Out; 5th Jury Member
Spyros Soulis; 28, Athens	North Team	North Team	Robinson	11th Voted Out; 6th Jury Member
Despina Siakou; 40, Athens	South Team	South Team	Robinson	12th Voted Out; 7th Jury Member
Orthoula Papadakou; 33, Athens	North Team	North Team	Robinson	Lost Challenge; 8th Jury Member
Nikos Lamprinakis; 47, Crete	South Team	North Team	Robinson	Runner-Up; Day 42
Evagelia Dermetzoglou; 31, Athens	North Team	North Team	Robinson	Sole Survivor; Day 42

== Voting history ==
	Original Tribes		Tribal Swap					Merged Tribe										
Episode; Cycle #:	1		2	3	4	5	6	7	8	9	10	11	12	13	14		Reunion	
Eliminated:	Rena; Walked	Sandra; 7/8 votes	Giannis; 5/8 votes^{1}	Thodoros; 6/7 votes^{2}	Dimitris; 4/7 votes	Eugenia; 5/6 votes	Konstantinos; 4/6 votes	Efimia; 5/10 votes^{3}	Maria; 7/9 votes	Katerina; No vote	Andreas; 4/7 votes	Elias; 3/6 votes	Spyros; 3/5 votes	Despina; 3/4 votes	Orthoula; No vote		Nikos; 0/8 votes	Evagelia; 8/8 votes
Voter	Vote																	
Evagelia		Sandra			Dimitris		Konstantinos	Despina	Maria		Elias	Elias	Spyros	Despina		Won	Jury Vote	
Nikos					Dimitris		Spyros	Despina	Maria		Andreas	Elias	Spyros	Despina	Won		Jury Vote	
Orthoula		Sandra			Dimitris		Konstantinos	Despina	Maria		Andreas	Elias	Spyros	Despina		Lost		Evagelia
Despina			Giannis	Thodoros		Eugenia		Efimia	Maria		Nikos	Nikos	Nikos	Nikos				Evagelia
Spyros		Sandra			Nikos		Konstantinos	Despina	Maria		Andreas	Nikos	Nikos					Evagelia
Elias		Sandra	Thodoros	Thodoros		Eugenia		Efimia	Maria		Andreas	Evagelia						Evagelia
Andreas			Giannis	Thodoros		Eugenia		Efimia	Nikos		Nikos							Evagelia
Katerina			Giannis	Thodoros		Eugenia		Efimia	Maria									Evagelia
Maria			Giannis	Thodoros		Eugenia		Efimia	Nikos									Evagelia
Efimia		Sandra			Dimitris		Konstantinos	Despina										Evagelia
Konstantinos		Sandra			Orthoula		Spyros											
Eugenia	Not in the game		Maria	Thodoros		Elias												
Dimitris		Sandra			Efimia													
Thodoros			Giannis	Walked														
Giannis			Maria															
Sandra		Elias																
Rena																		

^1 At the second tribal council, both Elias and Eugenia had immunity.

^2 This was an open vote because Thodoris decided to leave.

^3 At the seventh tribal council, both Despina and Efimia received five votes. Because of this the two were forced to compete in a duel which Despina won.
