= Survivor Greece 2 =

- Season 2
- Presented by: Grigoris Arnaoutoglou
- No. of days: 42
- No. of castaways: 20
- Winner: Konstantinos Christodoulopoulos
- Runner-up: Anna Majuro
- Location: Johor, Malaysia (Sribuat Island, Sembilang Island, Tengah Island)
- No. of episodes: 42

Release
- Original release: September 2004 – December 2004

Season chronology
- ← Previous; Season 1 Next → Season 3

Survivor 2, was the second edition of the Greek version of the popular reality show Survivor and it aired from September 2004 to December 2004.

There were a few main twists this season, the first being that the tribes were initially divided by gender. However, this twist was short lived due to the evacuation of Helen and Maria's voluntary exit both which took place in week two of the shows airing. The other twist for this season was that of "Gkoal", when a contestant was voted out they would be given a chance to go to Gkoal where they would duel other contestants for a spot in the game. The winner of Gkoal was Manolis. Right before the merge, the contestants took part in a challenge which Giannis lost and was eliminated. When it came time for the final four, all remaining contestants were asked to vote for someone to return to the game from the eliminated contestants, Konstantina who had been voted out right after the elimination challenge that took place before the merge, received the most votes and returned to the game. When given the opportunity to vote for a winner only three jury members chose to vote as the others didn't feel either of the final two deserved to win the season. Ultimately, it was Konstantinos Christodoulopoulos won this season over Anna Majuro with a jury vote of 3-0.

== Finishing order ==
Contestant	Original Tribes	Episode Cycle 3 Tribes	Episode Cycle 5 Tribes	Merged Tribe	Finish
Elene Karadimou; 32, Athens	Women				Evacuated
Maria Vella; 24, Athens	Women				Left Competition
Vicky Sapounas; 26, Alexandria	Women				1st Voted Out; Lost Duel
Anthanasia Markoydi; 24, Thessaloniki	Women				2nd Voted Out; Lost Duel
Mihalis Arpazoglou; 21, Athens	Men	North Team			3rd Voted Out; Lost Duel
Mara Kopanoy; 34, Athens	Women	South Team			Left Competition
Basilis poutsoris 46, Athens	Men	North Team			4th Voted Out; Lost Duel
Gerasimos Pylarinos; 25, Corinth	Men	South Team	South Team		5th Voted Out; Evacuated at Duel
Paulos Papadakis; 26, Chania	Men	South Team	South Team		6th Voted Out; Lost Duel
Giannis Tsiolis; 21, Athens	Men	North Team	North Team		Lost Challenge
Konstantina Psolia; 24, Athens	Women	South Team	South Team		7th Voted Out; Lost Duel; Voted back in 4th Jury Member
Giorgos Papafidis; 36, Athens	Men	South Team	South Team	Robinson	9th Voted Out; Lost Duel; 1st Jury Member
Melina Patakiouta; 26, Athens	Women	North Team	North Team	Robinson	Evacuated
Katerina Arxipoyloy; 24, Athens	Women	South Team	South Team	Robinson	10th Voted Out; Refused Duel; 2nd Jury Member
Paola Voutes; 25, Athens	Women	North Team	South Team	Robinson	11th Voted Out; Refused Duel; 3rd Jury Member
Nikos Soupias; 31, Chalcis	Men	South Team	North Team	Robinson	8th Voted Out; Lost Duel; 5th Jury Member
Manolis Bouzakis; 46, Chania	Men	South Team	South Team	Robinson	Won Final Duel; Lost Challenge; 6th Jury Member
Giorgos Sunetos; 29, Athens	Men	North Team	North Team	Robinson	Lost Challenge; 7th Jury Member
Anna Majuro; 32, Athens	Women	North Team	North Team	Robinson	Runner-Up; Day 42
Konstantinos Christodoulakis; 42, Athens	Men	North Team	North Team	Robinson	Sole Survivor; Day 42
