= Sakis Tanimanidis =

Greek TV host, producer and entrepreneur (born 1981)

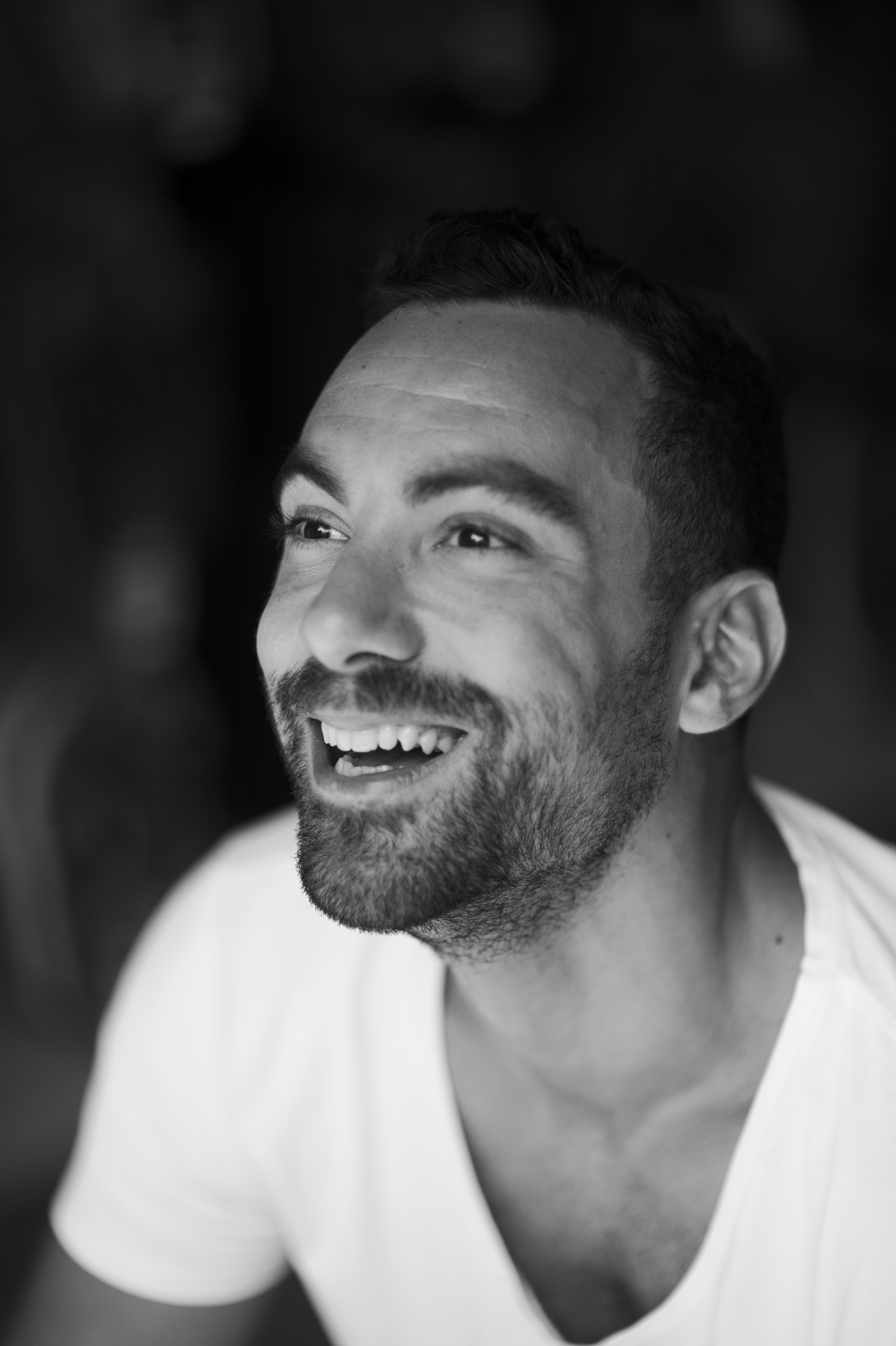
- Born: 30 April 1981 (age 45); Thessaloniki, Greece
- Other name: (Greek: Σάκης Τανιμανίδης)
- Spouse: Christina Bompa (m. 2018)
- Children: 2

Sakis Tanimanidis (Greek: Σάκης Τανιμανίδης; born 30 April 1981) is a Greek entrepreneur, TV host and producer. Tanimanidis became known in his native country as the host, creator, producer and director of the travel show World Party that aired on Alpha TV from 2014 to 2016. In 2017, he became a household name as the Greek host and co-producer of Survivor 2017 (the adaptation of the international franchise for the Turkish and Greek television). He is a serial entrepreneur. He is the co-founder of Paradox Museum, and has opened more than 20 museums around the world. He is the co-founder of BeWell festival, the largest wellness & fitness festival in Europe. He has invested/founded multiple start-ups in Greece and abroad.

== Early life ==
Tanimanidis was born in Thessaloniki, Greece on 30 April 1981. He showed an early interest in showbusiness: While still an engineer student in the state university of Thessaloniki, Tanimanidis co-hosted the TV show Asteria kai Labara on TV 100 before moving to Boston for a 2-year MBA in Babson College.

== Career ==
=== World Party (2013–2016) ===
Upon his return to Greece from the United States, Tanimanidis created his own TV production company, and the concept of the travel show World Party. In this show he and his friends visited more than 40 countries and engaged in risky experiences and challenges. World Party's mission was to explore the world through its people and places. Tanimanidis was the host, creator, producer and director of the show.

=== Survivor (2017–2019) ===
In 2017, Tanimanidis was chosen by Acun Medya as the host of Survivor. The show is filmed in the Dominican Republic for both Turkish and Greek audiences with Tanimanidis being the host of the Greek cast version. TV ratings have been record-breaking for a prime-time reality programme.

=== Greece Got Talent (2017–2018) ===
In 2017, he was selected to be one of the judges in season 5 of this show alongside Giorgos Kapoutzidis and Maria Bakodimou.

=== Boom! (2019–2020) ===
In 2019, he was the presenter on a new game show called Boom! on Skai TV. The game show was cancelled due to low ratings in December of the same year; some episodes aired on repeat in the summer of 2020.

=== Dragons’ Den (2023–present) ===
The Greek version of Dragons' Den began airing in January 2023 on ANT1, hosted by Tanimanidis.

Tanimanidis maintains his own travel agency and founded Baby Blue Project, a production company for TV shows, concept creation, commercial videos, content development and more. Baby Blue Project is based in Athens.

== Personal life ==
Tanimanidis announced in 2017 that he is in a relationship with Christina Bompa. The couple married Saturday 1 September 2018 in the Greek Island of Sifnos. In December 2020, they announced that they are expecting twins.
