= World Party (TV series) =

Greek travel show

- Genre: travel show
- Created by: Giorgos Mavridis (presenter, director); Sakis Tanimanidis (presenter, producer)
- Directed by: Sakis Tanimanidis; George Mavridis
- Theme music composer: Onirama
- Country of origin: Greece
- Original language: Greek
- No. of seasons: 4
- No. of episodes: 64

Production
- Running time: 44-60 minutes

Original release
- Network: ET3 (2013); Alpha TV (2014-2016)
- Release: 2013 – June 2016

World Party was a Greek travel show, hosted by George (or Giorgos) Mavridis and Sakis Tanimanidis. It aired on ET3 in 2013 and on Alpha TV from 2014 to 2016.

== Overview ==
World Party was presented by George Mavridis and Sakis Tanimanidis, and produced and edited by George Lentzas and Thodoris Plakidis. It was the second TV show for Tanimanidis.

The first season aired on ET3 in 2013. Between 2014 and 2016 it was shown on Alpha TV, where it was very successful, reaching between 30% and 40% of Greece's population. Since December 2016 it has aired occasionally, in the summer of 2017 and 2018, and at Christmas 2018 and 2019. Repeats have also attracted high viewership.
