= Elikonas Hill =

Low hill in Kypseli, Athens

Coordinates: 38.008306°N 23.743306°E

Elikonas
- Alepotrypa
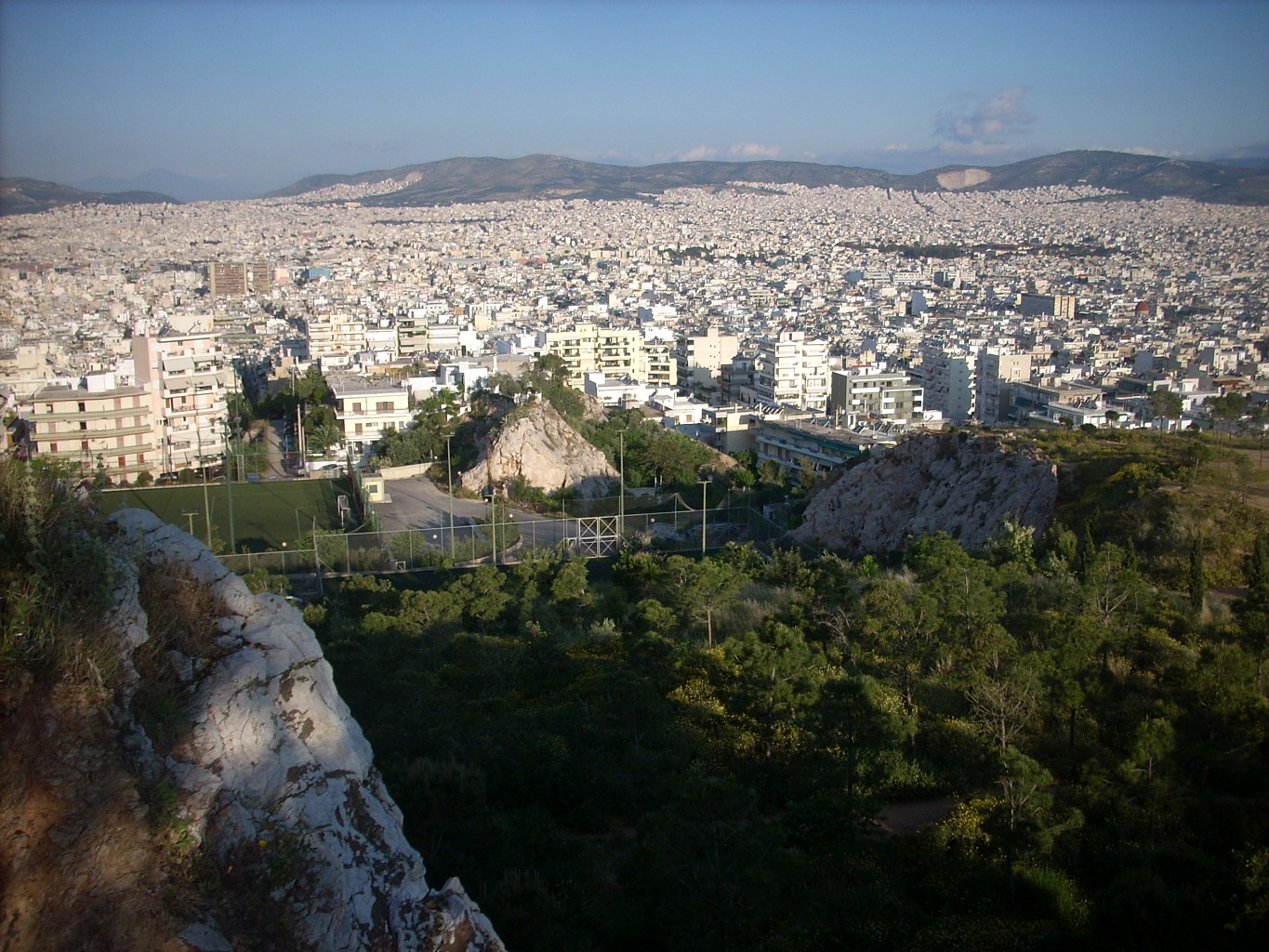

Highest point
- Elevation: 184 m (604 ft)

Naming
- Native name: Ελικώνας/Αλεπότρυπα (Greek)

Geography
- Location: Kypseli, Greece

Geology
- Mountain type: Hill

Elikonas, also known as Alepotrypa, is a low hill in Athens, located in the Kypseli district, north of Kypseli Square and on the border with Galatsi. It is located east of Patision Avenue, at the end of Amorgou and Anafi streets. It is a small hill with a peak at an altitude of 184 meters, which occupies an area of approximately 140 acres. It is enclosed by Travlantoni, Amorgou, Megistis, Astypalaias, Armonias and Elikonos streets, from which the hill takes its name. In the past, quarries owned by the Kourousis brothers operated on it. Since 1934, it has been declared a reforestation area. In the late 1980s, a youth center was built on part of the hill, which includes sports facilities, where the Athinais football team is based. Metro Line 4 will pass underground from the hill starting in 2027, and near the hill, in the park at the intersection of Hopf, Parnithos and Agias Glykerias streets, will be the Elikonos metro station, which will bear the name of the hill.
