= Killing of Elisabeth Ross =

Killing of Lisa Ross
- Location: Kypseli, Athens, Greece
- Date: July 15, 2026
- Attack type: Homicide by asphyxiation
- Victim: Elisabeth (Lisa) Ross
- Accused: Sharif Ahmadzai (aged 26)
- Charges: Homicide with intent; Robbery; Weapons offences

The body of Scottish aid worker, Elisabeth Ross, was found in a suitcase in a derelict building in the Kypseli area of Athens on 18 July 2026. Sharif Ahmadzai, 26, a boxer from Afghanistan, has been accused of her murder as well as robbery and weapons offences.

== Prelude ==
Sharif Ahmadzai's American wife, Alaina Hall, told police that the two met Lisa in February 2026 while volunteering for a refugee charity in Athens.

Ross is from Edinburgh and came to Greece to volunteer with a refugee support group based in Athens. She arrived in Greece on 26 June and stayed until at least 10 July in the Keratsini area of Piraeus.

== Timeline of the killing ==
Elisabeth Ross was found dead inside of a suitcase on 18 July 2026. Ahmadzai is believe to have killed Ross and then used her phone to send messages to her friends and family where he impersonated an jihadist saying he had killed Ross due to her religion. Ahmadzai's American wife, Alaina Hall, alerted police that she woke up on 15 July and Ahmadzai's location was at were Ross was staying, the day she is thought to have been killed. Ahmadzai was brought into a police station on 30 July.

== Personal details ==
Alaina Hall has a child with Ahmadzai.
