= Survivor Greece season 13 =

Survivor Greece
- Season 13
- Presented by: Giorgos Lianos
- No. of castaways: 37
- Winner: None
- Location: La Romana, Dominican Republic
- No. of episodes: 69

Release
- Original network: Skai TV
- Original release: January 11 – May 20, 2026

Additional information
- Filming dates: January 4 – May 20, 2026

Season chronology
- ← Previous; Season 12

The thirteenth season of the popular reality show Survivor Greece, premiered on January 11, 2026 on Skai TV in Greece and (via simulcast) Sigma TV in Cyprus. Giorgos Lianos returned as host for his eighth consecutive season. The shows format changed to Athenians vs Provincials (Αθηναίοι vs Επαρχιώτες) are invited to compete against one another for several months in a series of physical challenges on a deserted island at the exotic La Romana in the Dominican Republic. The competitors are only permitted to bring a very minimal amount of clothing and basic food supplies.

Τhe producers decided to change the format of the game from Diasimoi vs Machites and make people who live in Athens to compete against people from the Greek province. The final reward was raised from 100.000 euro to 250.000 euro, one of the biggest ever given to a Greek tv show. On November 8 the first trailer was released and on December 28 the first contestants names were announced.

== Contestants ==
The game began with twenty four players divided equally to two teams of twelve.

- On episode 17 (week 5), five new contestants entered the game. Benzy Karantonis, Valantis Pakos, Ariadni Dimitrelou and Antonis Nikolopoulos joined the Athinaioi team, while Eutixia Kirkosta was added to the Eparchiotes team.

- On episode 24 (week 7), two new contestants entered the game, Alexandros Tsilimigras was added to the Eparchiotes team and Lyda Mylona to the Athinaioi team.

- On episode 32 (week 8), Milena Sdrenia was added to the Athinaioi team.

- On episode 40 (week 11), five new contestants entered the game. Christiana Michaloudi and Konstantina Bakarou for the Eparxiotes team, Dimitra Kamtsi, Nikos Kappos and Olga Lovera for the Athinaioi team, which were the last additions to the cast.

- On episode 57 (week 15), after the merge party, the first switch of players happened. Michalis Sifakis joined the Athinaioi team and Dimitris Theodoropoulos was moved to the Eparxiotes team.

-On episode 68 (week 18), Ioanna Desylla switched to the Athinaioi team and Milena Sdrenia to the Eparxiothes team.

Contestant	Original tribe	Switched tribe 1	Switched tribe 2	Win rate	Finished
Elisavet Sekertzi; 30, Spata, Beauty Center owner	Athinaioi			28%	Evacuated; Episode 4
Stauroula Potiri; 31, Peristeri, Personal Trainer	Athinaioi			20%	1st Eliminated; Episode 4
Eleni Zaraga; 30, Karditsa, Teacher	Eparxiotes			28%	2nd Eliminated; Episode 8
Giannis Stinis; 41, Glyfada, Gym Owner	Athinaioi			39%	Evacuated; Episode 11
Foteini Kalevra; 34, Megalopoli, Businesswoman	Eparxiotes			25%	Walked; Episode 12
Gio Karantonis; 28, Terpsithea, Entrepreneur	Athinaioi			40%	Walked; Episode 13
Evelina Lykoudi; 22, Faliro, Marine Student	Athinaioi			50%	Walked; Episode 14
Giorgos Tsoukalas; 35, Kifisia, VIP Security	Athinaioi			52%	Walked; Episode 16
Christos Milonas; 41, Toumba, Αdministrative Αssistant	Eparxiotes			23%	3rd Eliminated; Episode 16
Eutixia Kirkosta; 30, Thessaloniki, Courier	Eparxiotes			25%	Walked; Episode 22
Kelly Bofiliou; 28, Kypseli, Medical Rep.	Athinaioi			34%	4th Eliminated; Episode 23
Lyda Mylona; 26, Vouliagmeni, Padel Player	Athinaioi			50%	Evacuated; Episode 27
Vasiliki Mounti; 24, Marousi, Personal Trainer	Athinaioi			36%	5th Eliminated; Episode 27
Fani Pantelaki; 34, Galatas, Football Player	Eparxiotes			56%	6th Eliminated; Episode 31
Valantis Pakos; 46, Athens, Correctional Officer	Athinaioi			41%	7th Eliminated; Episode 35
Antonis Nikolopoulos; 36, Pagkrati, Commercial Actor	Athinaioi			44%	Evacuated; Episode 38
Giorgos Karaisalidis; 27, Chalandri, Model	Athinaioi			59%	8th Eliminated; Episode 39
Alexandros Tsilimigras; 31, Nauplio, Watchmaker	Eparxiotes			24%	9th Eliminated; Episode 43
Dimitra Kamtsi; 29, Amsterdam, Pilates Instructor	Athinaioi			50%	Evacuated; Episode 44
Christiana Michaloudi; 23, Larissa, Personal Trainer	Eparxiotes			16%	10th Eliminated; Episode 47
Konstantina Bakarou; 22, Larissa, Pilates Instructor	Eparxiotes			8%	Evacuated; Episode 51
Olga Lovera; 36, Votanikos, Dancer	Athinaioi			44%	11th Eliminated; Episode 55
Dimitra Liaga; 28, Farsala, Security	Eparxiotes	Eparxiotes		31%	12th Eliminated; Episode 63
Mantisa Tsota; 27, Zografou, Volleyball Player	Athinaioi	Athinaioi		57%	13th Eliminated; Episode 67
Alexandros Kourtovik; 29, Agios Dimitrios, Hotel Manager	Athinaioi	Athinaioi	Athinaioi	49%	Production Suspended; Episode 69
Alex "Benzy" Karantonis; 25, Glyfada, Trapper	Athinaioi	Athinaioi	Athinaioi	51%	Production Suspended; Episode 69
Anastasia Stergiou; 25, Polichni, Constructor	Eparxiotes	Eparxiotes	Eparxiotes	75%	Production Suspended; Episode 69
Ariadni Dimitrelou; 26, Peristeri, Former Policewoman	Athinaioi	Athinaioi	Athinaioi	50%	Production Suspended; Episode 69
Dimitris Theodoropoulos; 29, Kalithea, Sportscaster	Athinaioi	Eparxiotes	Eparxiotes	71%	Production Suspended; Episode 69
Giorgos Polychros; 25, Chalastra, Fisherman	Eparxiotes	Eparxiotes	Eparxiotes	60%	Production Suspended; Episode 69
Ioanna Desylla; 26, Larissa, Taekwondo champion	Eparxiotes	Eparxiotes	Athinaioi	63%	Production Suspended; Episode 69
Ioannis Revis; 31, Igoumenitsa, Hotelier	Eparxiotes	Eparxiotes	Eparxiotes	51%	Production Suspended; Episode 69
Manos Malliaros; 27, Rethymno, Swim Coach	Eparxiotes	Eparxiotes	Eparxiotes	55%	Production Suspended; Episode 69
Michalis Sifakis; 41, Heraklion, Goalkeeper	Eparxiotes	Athinaioi	Athinaioi	48%	Production Suspended; Episode 69
Milena Sdrenia; 24, Piraeus, Basketball Player	Athinaioi	Athinaioi	Eparxiotes	49%	Production Suspended; Episode 69
Nikos Kappos; 27, Athens, Parkourist	Athinaioi	Athinaioi	Athinaioi	39%	Production Suspended; Episode 69
Stavros Floros; 21, Kavala, Apiarist	Eparxiotes	Eparxiotes	Eparxiotes	37%	Sole Survivor; Episode 69

== Nominations and elimination process ==
=== Nominations table ===
	Original tribes																																																				
Week #	1			2			3			4			5			6			7			8			9			10			11			12			13			14			15			16			17			18	
Episode #	1	2	3	5	6	7	9	10	11	13	14	15	17	18	19	20	21	22	24	25	26	28	29	30	32	33	34	36	37	38	40	41	42	44	45	46	48	49	50	52	53	54	57	58	59	60	61	62	64	65	66	68	69
Losing Tribe	Athinaioi	Athinaioi	Athinaioi	Eparxiotes	Athinaioi	Eparxiotes	Eparxiotes	Eparxiotes	Eparxiotes	Athinaioi	Eparxiotes	Eparxiotes	Athinaioi	Athinaioi	Eparxiotes	Athinaioi	Athinaioi	Eparxiotes	Athinaioi	Athinaioi	Eparxiotes	Eparxiotes	Eparxiotes	Eparxiotes	Athinaioi	Athinaioi	Eparxiotes	Eparxiotes	Eparxiotes	Athinaioi	Eparxiotes	Eparxiotes	Eparxiotes	Eparxiotes	Athinaioi	Eparxiotes	Athinaioi	Eparxiotes	Athinaioi	Athinaioi	Athinaioi	Athinaioi	Athinaioi	Athinaioi	Athinaioi	Eparxiotes	Eparxiotes	Eparxiotes	Athinaioi	Athinaioi	Athinaioi	Athinaioi	Production suspended
Votes	5–2–2–1–1–1	11–1	6–2–2–1–1	10–1–1	6–2–1–1	6–6	4–4–1	8–2–1	8–1–1–1	6–1–1	4–2–2–1–1	9–1	8–1–1	6–3–1	8–2	6–2–2	6–2–1–1	3–3–2–1	8–3	6–2–1	7–3	7–3	6–3–1	6–4	6–2–1–1	5–2–1–1	6–2–2	7–2	5–4	4–2–1–1	7–3–1	7-4	10–1	10–1	7–1–1	5–4–1	5–2–1	9–1	3–3–2	6–2	3–3–1–1	4–3–1	6–2	6–1	5–2	7–1	5–3	7–1	5–2	5–2	4–2–1	5–1	Production suspended
Nominees	Stauroula	Gio	Kelly	Eleni	Giannis	Foteini; Stavros	Dimitra; Christos	Fani	Foteini	~~Evelina~~*	Christos; Stavros; Ioannis	Michalis; Giorgos P.	Kelly	Alexandros	Ioannis	Valantis	Vasiliki	Fani; Dimitra	Vasiliki	Dimitris	Dimitra	Dimitra	Fani	Michalis	Mantisa	Valantis	Michalis	Alexandros	Stavros; Manos	Giorgos K.	Stavros	Alexandros; Manos	Michalis	Christiana	Olga	Konstantina; Stavros	Mantisa	Konstantina	Nikos; Olga	Olga	Mantisa; Nikos	Benzy	Nikos	Alexandros	Mantisa	Dimitra	Manos	Stavros	Mantisa	Nikos	Alexandros	Nikos	Production suspended
Saved by public vote	Gio			Giannis	Stavros		Christos & Fani			Michalis, Giorgos P. & Stavros			Alexandros, Valantis & Vasiliki			Fani & Dimitra			Dimitris			Michalis			Michalis			Manos & Alexandros			Michalis & Manos			Olga	Stavros		Mantisa & Nikos			Benzy & Mantisa			Alexandros & Mantisa			Manos & Stavros							Production suspended
Immunity winner																																																	Alexandros				Production suspended
Eliminated in Challenge	Stauroula			Eleni			Foteini			Christos			Kelly						Vasiliki			Fani			Valantis			Giorgos K.			Alexandros			Christiana			Konstantina*			Olga			Dimitra						Mantisa				Production suspended
Voter	Vote																																																				
Stavros				Eleni		Foteini	Christos	Foteini	Foteini		Ioannis	Michalis			Ioannis			Manos			Dimitra	Dimitra	Fani	Michalis			Michalis	Dimitra	Manos		Manos	Manos	Michalis	Christiana x2		Dimitra		Konstantina								Dimitra	Manos	Ioannis					WINNER
Alexandros	Elisavet	Gio	Kelly		Giannis					Kelly			Kelly	Dimitris		Valantis	Vasiliki		Vasiliki	Dimitris					Giorgos K.	Giorgos K.				Giorgos K. x2					Olga		Mantisa		Olga	Olga	Mantisa	Benzy	Nikos	Mantisa	Mantisa				Mantisa	Nikos	Milena	Nikos	Production suspended
Ariadni	Not competing yet												Kelly	Dimitris		Vasiliki	Dimitris		Vasiliki x2	Dimitris					Antonis	Antonis				Benzy					Olga		Mantisa		Olga	Olga	Mantisa	Benzy	Nikos	Alexandros	Mantisa				Nikos	Nikos	Alexandros	Nikos	Production suspended
Benzy	Not competing yet												Kelly	Dimitris		Dimitris	Vasiliki		Vasiliki	Dimitris					Mantisa	Antonis				Giorgos K.					Olga		Olga		Nikos	Olga	Nikos	Dimitris	Nikos	Alexandros	Ariadni				Mantisa	Nikos	Alexandros	Nikos x2	Production suspended
Ioanna				Eleni		Stavros	Dimitra	Fani	Foteini		Giorgos P.	Michalis			Ioannis			Michalis			Dimitra	Dimitra	Fani	Michalis			Michalis	Alexandros	Stavros		Manos	Alexandros	Michalis	Christiana		Konstantina		Konstantina								Dimitra	Manos	Stavros				Nikos	Production suspended
Michalis				Eleni		Foteini	Fani	Fani	Giorgos P.		Christos	Giorgos P.			Ioannis			Fani			Stavros	Alexandros	Alexandros	Alexandros			Alexandros; Stavros	Alexandros	Manos		Stavros	Manos	Giorgos P.	Christiana		Konstantina		Konstantina					Nikos	Alexandros	Mantisa				Mantisa	Nikos	Alexandros	Blocked	Production suspended
Nikos	Not competing yet																																		Dimitris		Alexandros		Alexandros	Mantisa	Milena	Alexandros	Alexandros x2	Alexandros	Mantisa				Mantisa	Michalis	Michalis	Michalis	Production suspended
Anastasia				Eleni		Stavros	Dimitra	Fani	Foteini		Christos	Michalis			Ioannis			Dimitra			Dimitra	Dimitra	Fani	Michalis			Michalis	Alexandros	Manos		Manos	Alexandros	Michalis	Christiana		Konstantina		Konstantina								Dimitra	Manos	Stavros					Production suspended
Dimitris	Mantisa	Gio	Evelina		Giannis					Evelina			Kelly	Alexandros		Valantis	Ariadni		Alexandros	Antonis					Mantisa x2	Valantis				Mantisa					Olga x2		Mantisa		Olga	Olga	Nikos	Benzy				Dimitra	Manos	Stavros					Production suspended
Giorgos P.				Eleni		Foteini	Christos	Ioannis	Foteini		Christos	Michalis			Ioannis			Dimitra			Dimitra	Dimitra	Fani	Michalis			Michalis	Alexandros	Stavros		Stavros	Alexandros	Michalis	Christiana		Stavros		Konstantina								Dimitra	Manos	Stavros					Production suspended
Ioannis				Eleni		Foteini	Dimitra	Fani	Foteini		Stavros	Michalis			Fani			Fani			Stavros	Alexandros	Alexandros	Alexandros			Alexandros	Alexandros	Stavros		Stavros	Alexandros	Michalis	Christiana		Stavros		Konstantina								Dimitra	Stavros	Stavros					Production suspended
Manos				Eleni		Foteini	Christos	Fani	Foteini		Ioannis	Michalis			Ioannis			Michalis			Dimitra	Dimitra	Fani	Michalis			Michalis	Alexandros	Stavros		Stavros	Alexandros	Michalis	Christiana		Konstantina		Konstantina								Dimitra	Stavros	Stavros					Production suspended
Milena	Not competing yet																								Valantis	Valantis				Benzy					Olga		Mantisa		Nikos	Olga	Mantisa	Benzy	Nikos	Alexandros	Mantisa				Mantisa	Nikos	Alexandros		Production suspended
Mantisa	Dimitris	Gio	Kelly		Giannis					Evelina			Kelly	Alexandros		Valantis	Vasiliki		Vasiliki	Dimitris					Valantis	Valantis				Giorgos K.					Olga		Alexandros		Nikos	Olga	Nikos	Alexandros	Nikos	Alexandros	Ariadni				Nikos	Michalis	Michalis	Eliminated	
Dimitra				Eleni		Stavros	Christos	Fani	Stavros		Christos	Michalis			Fani			Fani			Stavros	Alexandros	Alexandros	Alexandros			Stavros	Alexandros	Stavros		Stavros	Alexandros	Michalis	Christiana		Stavros		Konstantina x2								Stavros	Stavros	Stavros	Eliminated				
Olga	Not competing yet																																		Alexandros		Mantisa		Alexandros	Mantisa	Alexandros	Alexandros	Eliminated										
Konstantina	Not competing yet																														Stavros	Alexandros	Michalis	Christiana		Stavros		Dimitra		Evacuated													
Christiana	Not competing yet																														Stavros	Manos	Michalis	Konstantina		Konstantina	Eliminated																
Dimitra	Not competing yet																																	Evacuated																			
Alexandros	Not competing yet																				Dimitra	Dimitra	Fani	Michalis			Michalis	Dimitra	Manos		Michalis	Manos	Michalis	Eliminated																			
Giorgos K.	Stauroula	Gio	Kelly		Evelina					Evelina			Kelly	Alexandros		Valantis	Mantisa		Alexandros	Antonis					Mantisa	Valantis				Alexandros	Eliminated																						
Antonis	Not competing yet												Kelly	Alexandros		Vasiliki	Vasiliki		Vasiliki	Dimitris					Mantisa	Valantis				Evacuated																							
Valantis	Not competing yet												Dimitris	Giorgos K.		Vasiliki	Vasiliki		Vasiliki	Dimitris					Mantisa	Benzy		Eliminated																									
Fani				Eleni		Stavros	Dimitra	Foteini	Foteini		Stavros	Michalis			Ioannis			Dimitra			Dimitra	Dimitra	Michalis	Alexandros	Eliminated																												
Vasiliki	Mantisa	Gio	Kelly		Giannis					Evelina			Kelly	Alexandros		Valantis	Mantisa		Alexandros	Ariadni		Eliminated																															
Lyda	Not competing yet																		Vasiliki	Unwell		Evacuated																															
Kelly	Giorgos K.	Gio	Giorgos T.		Giannis					Evelina			Mantisa	Alexandros		Valantis	Antonis		Eliminated																																		
Eutixia	Not competing yet														Ioannis			Walked																																			
Christos				Eleni		Foteini	Blocked	Fani	Foteini		Manos	Michalis	Eliminated																																								
Giorgos T.	Stauroula	Gio	Kelly		Evelina					Evelina			Walked																																								
Evelina	Giorgos K.	Gio	Giorgos K.		Giorgos T. Giannis					Giorgos T.	Walked																																										
Gio	Stauroula	Giorgos T.	Giorgos T.		Unwell					Walked																																											
Foteini				Dimitra		Stavros	Blocked	Fani	Ioannis	Walked																																											
Giannis	Stauroula	Gio	Kelly		Vasiliki				Evacuated																																												
Eleni				Christos		Stavros	Eliminated																																														
Stauroula	Giannis	Gio	Giannis	Eliminated																																																	
Elisavet	Stauroula	Gio	Evelina	Evacuated																																																	

- Evelina was nominated on the 13th episode but she decided to leave the competition.
- Konstantina was nominated from public vote to compete in elimination challenge but she left due to illness.

== Matches ==
=== Team matches ===
Episode			Winner	Score	Reward
Week	No.	Air date	Winner	Score	Reward
1	1	January 11, 2026	Eparxiotes	10-4	Immunity & Survivor kit
1	2	January 12, 2026	Eparxiotes	10-9	Immunity
1	3	January 13, 2026	Eparxiotes	10-7	Immunity
1	4	January 14, 2026	Eparxiotes	10-8	Shelter tools & Beans
2	5	January 18, 2026	Athinaioi	10-8	Immunity
2	6	January 19, 2026	Eparxiotes	10-8	Immunity
2	7	January 20, 2026	Athinaioi	10-7	Immunity & Lunch
2	8	January 21, 2026	Eparxiotes	7-3	Souvlaki & Kebab
3	9	January 25, 2026	Athinaioi	10-6	Immunity
3	10	January 26, 2026	Athinaioi	10-5	Immunity
3	11	January 27, 2026	Athinaioi	10-2	Immunity & Lunch
3	12	January 28, 2026	Athinaioi	10-6	Fishing Kit
4	13	February 1, 2026	Eparxiotes	10-7	Immunity & Snack
4	14	February 2, 2026	Athinaioi	10-8	Immunity
4	15	February 3, 2026	Athinaioi	10-7	Immunity
4	16	February 4, 2026	Eparxiotes	7-3	Noodles
5	17	February 8, 2026	Eparxiotes	10-5	Immunity & Lunch
5	18	February 9, 2026	Eparxiotes	10-8	Immunity
5	19	February 10, 2026	Athinaioi	10-6	Immunity
6	20	February 15, 2026	Eparxiotes	10-8	Immunity & Halvas
6	21	February 16, 2026	Eparxiotes	10-9	Immunity
6	22	February 17, 2026	Athinaioi	10-7	Immunity
6	23	February 19, 2026	Eparxiotes	7-6	Souvlaki
7	24	February 22, 2026	Eparxiotes	10-5	Immunity
7	25	February 23, 2026	Eparxiotes	10-7	Immunity & Communication Reward
7	26	February 25, 2026	Athinaioi	10-7	Immunity & Lunch
7	27	February 26, 2026	Athinaioi	10-7	Lunch
8	28	March 1, 2026	Athinaioi	10-8	Immunity
8	29	March 2, 2026	Athinaioi	10-7	Immunity & Pasta
8	30	March 3, 2026	Athinaioi	10-7	Immunity & Burgers
8	31	March 4, 2026	Athinaioi	10-5	Communication Reward
9	32	March 7, 2026	Eparxiotes	10-6	Immunity & Sandwiches
9	33	March 8, 2026	Eparxiotes	10-6	Immunity
9	34	March 9, 2026	Athinaioi	10-7	Immunity & Hot Dogs
9	35	March 10, 2026	Athinaioi	10-7	Lunch
10	36	March 14, 2026	Athinaioi	10-5	Immunity
10	37	March 15, 2026	Athinaioi	10-5	Immunity & Lunch
10	38	March 16, 2026	Eparxiotes	10-7	Immunity & Legumes
10	39	March 17, 2026	Eparxiotes	10-8	Communication Reward
11	40	March 22, 2026	Athinaioi	10-4	Immunity
11	41	March 23, 2026	Athinaioi	10-6	Immunity
11	42	March 24, 2026	Athinaioi	10-8	Immunity
11	43	March 25, 2026	Eparxiotes	10-9	Resort stay and Dinner
12	44	March 29, 2026	Athinaioi	10-6	Immunity
12	45	March 30, 2026	Eparxiotes	10-9	Immunity & Lunch
12	46	March 31, 2026	Athinaioi	10-6	Immunity & Lunch
12	47	April 1, 2026	Athinaioi	10-6	Communication Reward
13	48	April 5, 2026	Eparxiotes	10-4	Immunity & Lunch
13	49	April 6, 2026	Athinaioi	10-8	Immunity & Lunch
13	50	April 7, 2026	Eparxiotes	10-8	Immunity
13	51	April 8, 2026	Eparxiotes	10-9	Communication Reward
14	52	April 12, 2026	Eparxiotes	10-5	Immunity & Lunch
14	53	April 13, 2026	Eparxiotes	10-8	Immunity
14	54	April 14, 2026	Eparxiotes	10-2	Immunity
14	55	April 15, 2026	Athinaioi	10-4	Communication Reward
15	56	April 19, 2026	Giorgos P.	-	Merge Party: Singing contest
15	57	April 20, 2026	Eparxiotes	10-8	Immunity
15	58	April 21, 2026	Eparxiotes	10-3	Immunity
15	59	April 22, 2026	Eparxiotes	10-7	Immunity
16	60	April 26, 2026	Athinaioi	10-9	Immunity
16	61	April 27, 2026	Athinaioi	10-6	Immunity
16	62	April 28, 2026	Athinaioi	10-4	Immunity
16	63	April 29, 2026	Red	15-14	Mixed Game with Turkish contestants: 80's party
17	64	May 3, 2026	Eparxiotes	10-6	Immunity
17	65	May 4, 2026	Eparxiotes	10-7	Immunity
17	66	May 5, 2026	Eparxiotes	10-1	Immunity
17	67	May 7, 2026	Blue	15-7	Mixed Game with Turkish contestants : Lunch
18	68	May 10, 2026	Eparxiotes	10-5	Immunity

== Ratings ==
Official ratings are taken from AGB Hellas.

Week	Episode	Air date	Timeslot (EET)	Ratings	Viewers (in millions)	Rank		Share		Source
Week	Episode	Air date	Timeslot (EET)	Ratings	Viewers (in millions)	Daily	Weekly	Household	Adults 18-54	Source
1	1	January 11, 2026	Sunday 9:00pm	9.9%	0.995	#1	#1	23.8%	19.6%	
1	2	January 12, 2026	Monday 9:00pm	8.6%	0.872	#1	#1	21.9%	18.0%	
1	3	January 13, 2026	Tuesday 9:00pm	8.3%	0.837	#1	#2	21.9%	18.5%	
1	4	January 14, 2026	Wednesday9:40pm	7.3%	0.734	#1	#4	20.7%	18.2%	
2	5	January 18, 2026	Sunday 9:00pm	5.7%	0.582	#5	-	13.9%	8.9%	
2	6	January 19, 2026	Monday 9:00pm	-	-	-	-	10.8%	11.9%	
2	7	January 20, 2026	Tuesday 9:00pm	-	-	-	-	11.2%	9.5%	
2	8	January 21, 2026	Wednesday 10:15pm	-	-	-	-	16.6%	14.2%	
3	9	January 25, 2026	Sunday 9:00pm	6.4%	0.648	#1	-	16.2%	13.3%	
3	10	January 26, 2026	Monday 9:00pm	-	-	-	-	10.5%	11.1%	
3	11	January 27, 2026	Tuesday 9:00pm	-	-	-	-	11.1%	11.2%	
3	12	January 28, 2026	Wednesday 9:40pm	-	-	-	-	11.8%	9.8%	
4	13	February 1, 2026	Sunday 9:00pm	6.4%	0.615	#5	-	14.9%	12.4%	
4	14	February 2, 2026	Monday 10:00pm	-	-	-	-	10.3%	9.6%	
4	15	February 3, 2026	Tuesday 9:00pm	-	-	-	-	8.8%	7.0%	
4	16	February 4, 2026	Wednesday 9:40pm	-	-	-	-	10.8%	9.1%	
5	17	February 8, 2026	Sunday 9:00pm	5.5%	0.559	#4	-	13.7%	9.8%	
5	18	February 9, 2026	Monday 9:00pm	-	-	-	-	9.8%	8.4%	
5	19	February 10, 2026	Tuesday 9:00pm	-	-	-	-	8.8%	7.1%	
6	20	February 15, 2026	Sunday 9:00pm	4.5%	0.457	#9	-	10.6%	7.0%	
6	21	February 16, 2026	Monday 9:00pm	-	-	-	-	11.2%	11.6%	
6	22	February 17, 2026	Tuesday 9:00pm	-	-	-	-	10.1%	10.3%	
6	23	February 19, 2026	Thursday 9:00pm	-	-	-	-	10.0%	8.5%	
7	24	February 22, 2026	Sunday 9:00pm	5.3%	0.539	#2	-	14.3%	7.0%	
7	25	February 23, 2026	Monday 10:10pm	-	-	-	-	13.5%	10.9%	
7	26	February 25, 2026	Wednesday 9:40pm	-	-	-	-	10.5%	9.2%	
7	27	February 26, 2026	Thursday 9:00pm	-	-	-	-	8.7%	6.4%	
8	28	March 1, 2026	Sunday 9:00pm	5.2%	0.526	#4	-	13.7%	8.7%	
8	29	March 2, 2026	Monday 10:10pm	-	-	-	-	12.9%	11.6%	
8	30	March 3, 2026	Tuesday 9:00pm	-	-	-	-	10.2%	9.7%	
8	31	March 4, 2026	Wednesday 9:40pm	-	-	-	-	12.1%	9.9%	
9	32	March 7, 2026	Saturday 9:00pm	4.8%	0.488	#6	-	13.6%	9.2%	
9	33	March 8, 2026	Sunday 9:00pm	5.3%	0.535	#4	-	14.0%	10.0%	
9	34	March 9, 2026	Monday 10:10pm	-	-	-	-	13.2%	12.2%	
9	35	March 10, 2026	Tuesday 9:00pm	-	-	-	-	10.0%	8.5%	
10	36	March 14, 2026	Saturday 9:00pm	4.3%	0.434	#7	-	12.4%	6.6%	
10	37	March 15, 2026	Sunday 9:00pm	5.6%	0.566	#5	-	15.0%	10.7%	
10	38	March 16, 2026	Monday 10:10pm	-	-	-	-	12.7%	11.0%	
10	39	March 17, 2026	Tuesday 9:00pm	-	-	-	-	10.3%	9.7%	
11	40	March 22, 2026	Sunday 9:00pm	5.4%	0.540	#4	-	14.9%	10.2%	
11	41	March 23, 2026	Monday 10:10pm	-	-	-	-	13.0%	12.2%	
11	42	March 24, 2026	Tuesday 9:00pm	-	-	-	-	8.5%	6.5%	
11	43	March 25, 2026	Wednesday 9:40pm	-	-	-	-	13.2%	10.2%	
12	44	March 29, 2026	Sunday 9:00pm	5.7%	0.573	#4	-	14.2%	10.0%	
12	45	March 30, 2026	Monday 10:10pm	-	-	-	-	11.5%	10.2%	
12	46	March 31, 2026	Tuesday 9:00pm	-	-	-	-	8.8%	7.0%	
12	47	April 1, 2026	Wednesday 9:40pm	-	-	-	-	12.7%	10.3%	
13	48	April 5, 2026	Sunday 9:00pm	5.0%	0.502	#3	-	12.9%	8.3%	
13	49	April 6, 2026	Monday 9:00pm	-	-	-	-	9.8%	9.2%	
13	50	April 7, 2026	Tuesday 9:00pm	4.0%	0.406	-	-	10.8%	9.0%	
13	51	April 8, 2026	Wednesday 9:00pm	4.0%	0.402	#8	-	11.4%	6.9%	
14	52	April 12, 2026	Sunday 9:00pm	4.7%	0.469	#1	-	14.0%	9.0%	
14	53	April 13, 2026	Monday 9:00pm	4.6%	0.466	#2	-	13.3%	9.8%	
14	54	April 14, 2026	Tuesday 9:00pm	4.9%	0.495	#7	-	13.3%	10.1%	
14	55	April 15, 2026	Wednesday 9:00pm	4.2%	0.428	#8	-	11.4%	7.6%	
15	56	April 19, 2026	Sunday 9:00pm	5.0%	0.503	#4	-	12.8%	8.0%	
15	57	April 20, 2026	Monday 9:00pm	-	-	-	-	9.3%	8.8%	
15	58	April 21, 2026	Tuesday 9:00pm	-	-	-	-	9.3%	9.0%	
15	59	April 22, 2026	Wednesday 9:00pm	-	-	-	-	10.0%	8.7%	
16	60	April 26, 2026	Sunday 9:00pm	4.7%	0.475	#4	-	12.2%	8.2%	
16	61	April 27, 2026	Monday 9:00pm	-	-	-	-	9.5%	8.9%	
16	62	April 28, 2026	Tuesday 9:00pm	-	-	-	-	8.1%	6.6%	
16	63	April 29, 2026	Wednesday 9:00pm	4.2%	0.429	#10	-	12.3%	9.1%	
17	64	May 3, 2026	Sunday 9:00pm	4.5%	0.450	#6	-	11.5%	8.0%	
17	65	May 4, 2026	Monday 10:30pm	-	-	-	-	14.9%	13.3%	
17	66	May 5, 2026	Tuesday 9:00pm	-	-	-	-	9.0%	7.9%	
17	67	May 7, 2026	Thursday 9:00pm	-	-	-	-	10.9%	9.2%	
18	68	May 10, 2026	Sunday 9:00pm	4.5%	0.457	#3	-	11.9%	8.5%	
18	69	May 20, 2026	Wednesday 9:00pm	-	-	-	-	9.2%	6.8%	

== Spearfishing accident and early suspension ==
On May 10, while all the contestants were relaxing at the beach, Stavros Floros and Manos Malliaros decided to go spearfishing. Τhey were far away from the coast and they had placed a buoy, when a tourist boat going to Saona Island passed and hit Stavros with the propellers. The driver realized that something had happened, returned and with the help of Manos, they transported Stavros to the port, where an ambulance took him to the hospital with very serious injuries.

After a very serious surgery, the doctors amputated his left leg from the knee down and he also had a serious injury to his right ankle. Manos Malliaros suffered a nervous breakdown from the shock and was also hospitalized. The production company Acun Medya and the network issued statements acknowledging the incident and expressing their support to the victim's family. Producer Acun Ilicali and network execs traveled to Dominican Republic to review the situation closely. Authorities are investigating how the accident happened and until the causes of the incident are fully investigated, the network temporarily suspended the show.

On Saturday 16th, Manos Malliaros returned to Greece and at the airport his family and press were expecting him.

On Wednesday 20th the network released a press release announcing the finale of the show. A special 12 minute episode was aired that night with the host Giorgos Lianos and the final contestants saying goodbye and sending their best wishes to Stavros, Manos and their families.

Stavros Floros was named sole survivor 2026.
