= Athinais F.C. =

Athinais
- Full name: Athlitikos Omilos "Athinais" Kypseli
- Founded: 1938; 88 years ago
- Ground: Kypseli Municipal Stadium
- Capacity: 320
- Chairman: Georgios Tatsis
- Manager: Konstantinos Vogatsas
- League: Athens FCA Second Division
- 2025–26: Athens FCA Second Division (Group 3), 4th
- Website: athinaidafc.gr
Home colours	Away colours	Third colours

Athinais Kypseli F.C. (Greek: Αθλητικός Όμιλος «Αθηναΐς» Κυψέλης, full name Athlitikos Omilos "Athinais" Kypseli) is an football club officially founded in 1938 and stands as the oldest sports club in the Athens neighborhood of Kypseli. It currently competes in the Athens FCA local leagues, though it has previously featured in the Gamma Ethniki and Delta Ethniki national divisions.

== History ==
=== Foundation ===
Athinais was founded in 1938 by local football enthusiasts in Kypseli, who chose the name "Athinais" after one of the ancient Attic tribes from the era of Erichthonius.

During the 1937–38 season, the "Federation of Independent Football Clubs of Athens" (OPASA) was founded by local neighborhood clubs, with Athinais being among its founding members. The club continued to compete in OPASA's unofficial league during the 1938–39 season. In 1939, it received official recognition from the HFF with HFF Registration Number (AM) 133, joining the ranks of the Athens FCA and making its official competitive debut in the Athens FCA Third Division during the 1939–40 season.

=== 1940–1972 ===
Thereafter, the club competed continuously in the Athens FCA Third Division, securing promotion to the Second Division in 1969. In 1972, as runners-up of the Second Division, Athinais achieved promotion to the top tier of the Athens FCA regional league for the first time in its history.

=== 1972–1981 ===
The club established itself in the top tier of the Athens FCA starting in the 1972–73 season. The following 1973–74 season, Athinais finished 8th, followed by an 11th-place finish in 1977–78. In the 1978–79 campaign, it placed 4th in the Athens FCA First Division behind champion Athinaikos. In 1980, the team won the Athens FCA First Division title for the first time in its history, earning promotion to the National Amateur Category (then serving as the Greek third tier). During the 1980–81 season, Athinais finished 19th out of 21 teams in Group 1 of the National Amateur Division with 17 points, narrowly suffering relegation back to the local leagues.

=== 1981–2000 ===
During the 1989–90 season, Athinais finished 4th in Group 1 of the Athens FCA First Division, while the club's youth academy team reached the final of the Athens FCA Youth Championship. By the 1995–96 campaign, the team was competing in Group 3 of the Athens FCA Second Division, battling to avoid relegation. Eventually, in the 1999–2000 season, the club secured promotion and returned to the Athens FCA First Division.

=== 2000–2007 ===
During the 2000–01 season, the club finished 9th in the Athens FCA First Division. The following 2001–02 season, Athinais narrowly missed promotion to the Delta Ethniki after losing in a play-off match, featuring future head coach Evans Pavlopoulos in its playing squad.

In 2003, the "Lady of Kypseli" captured its second Athens FCA First Division championship title, earning promotion to the Delta Ethniki. In its debut Delta Ethniki campaign during the 2003–04 season, Athinais finished as runners-up, qualifying for the promotion play-off match against Anagennisi Arta held at Prosfygika Stadium in Patras, where it lost 3–0. However, following a league restructuring, the club was granted promotion to the official Gamma Ethniki third tier.

During the 2004–05 season, the club competed in the Gamma Ethniki for the first time in its history. It finished second-to-last in 16th place in the Southern Group and was relegated back to the Delta Ethniki.

In 2007, the club suffered another relegation back to the local regional leagues, a campaign marked by one of its heaviest home defeats, losing 2–7 to Athinaikos at the Alepotrypa Stadium.

=== 2007–2025 ===
The initial years in the regional divisions proved challenging, with Athinais eventually falling to the Athens FCA Third Division in 2013. During the 2015–16 season, the team rebounded back to the Second Division. At the end of that season, the club organized a friendly match against Panathinaikos U-17 and honored key figures who had contributed to the organization. Guests of honor included Mimis Domazos, Juan Ramón Rocha, Kostas Frantzeskos, Spiros Marangos, Kostas Batsinilas, and Giorgos Gonios.

During the 2016–17 season, Athinais achieved promotion to the First Division, though it suffered immediate relegation the following 2017–18 campaign. In the 2022–23 season, the club finished as champions of Group 1 in the Second Division, before facing relegation once again in the 2023–24 season.

In the 2024–25 season, the team competed in the Athens FCA Second Division, finishing in 7th place. That season was marked by a unique achievement in Greek football history: on 2 November 2024, brothers Iason and Filippos Filos each scored a hat-trick in a 6–1 victory over Asteras Glyfadas at the Alepotrypa Stadium.

== Crest and Colours ==
The club's traditional colors are blue and white, while light blue and black are also used, and its crest features an eagle.

== Stadium ==
The synthetic turf stadium of Athinais, commonly known as Alepotrypa (capacity: 320), features a notable history. The concept of establishing a football ground in Ano Kypseli, specifically on Elikonas Hill, dates back to the 1960s. Construction of the initial pitch on Elikonas was initiated in the late 1980s by the Municipality of Athens Youth and Sports Organization (ONAD) alongside regional authorities. Over time, the facility was upgraded to full regulation pitch dimensions, gradually acquiring grandstands, changing rooms, perimeter fencing, and floodlighting.

Until 2000, the Kypseli club played its home matches at Zirineio Municipal Stadium in Kifisia, in Pefki, and later at the Veikou Park stadium in Galatsi. Up until the turn of the millennium, the pitch at Alepotrypa remained a dirt field like most grounds of that era, with artificial turf being installed several years later. On 20 February 2016, the fully renovated Alepotrypa football stadium was officially inaugurated.

== Honours ==
=== Regional ===
- Athens FCA Championship (2): 1979–80, 2002–03

== Personnel ==
=== Board of directors ===
Position	Name
President	Giorgos Tatsis
1st Vice President	Konstantinos Tatsis
2nd Vice President	Katerina Tatsi
General Secretary	Stavroula Kontoggona
Special Secretary	Adam Gropatsakis
Treasurer	Dimitrios Pantazopoulos
General Team Manager	Georgios Sakkas
Director of Football Operations	Dimitrios Tatsis
Board Member	Ioannis Palyvos
