= ULEB Cup 2007–08 Regular Season Group F =

These are the Group F Standings and Results:

Key to colors
Top three places in each group, plus five highest-ranked four-places teams, advance to Top 32
Eliminated

== Standings ==
	Team	Pld	W	L	PF	PA	Diff
1.	(Russia) Dynamo Moscow	10	8	2	913	809	104
2.	(Belgium) Telindus BC Oostende	10	6	4	814	799	15
3.	(Serbia) Red Star Belgrade	10	6	4	839	848	-9
4.	(Czech Republic) CEZ Nymburk	10	5	5	825	802	23
5.	(Italy) UPIM Bologna	10	4	6	745	759	-14
6.	(Greece) Panellinios GS	10	1	9	722	841	-119

== Results/Fixtures ==
All times given below are in Central European Time.

=== Game 1 ===
November 6, 2007

November 6
17:00

Panellinios GS (Greece)	84–77	(Belgium) Telindus BC
Scoring by quarter: 19-18, 20-25, 22-20, 23-14

Kypseli

November 6
18:00

Dynamo Moscow (Russia)	91–66	(Italy) UPIM Bologna
Scoring by quarter: 22-15, 27-24, 17-12, 25-15

Moscow

November 6
19:30

CEZ Nymburk (Czech Republic)	87–94 (OT) (OT)	(Serbia) Red Star
Scoring by quarter: 23-15, 18-26, 16-22, 22-16, Overtime: 8-15

Nymburk

=== Game 2 ===
November 13, 2007

November 13
19:00

Red Star (Serbia)	79–69	(Greece) Panellinios GS
Scoring by quarter: 29-13, 16-22, 18-22, 16-12

Belgrade

November 13
20:30

Telindus BC (Belgium)	89–83	(Russia) Dynamo Moscow
Scoring by quarter: 21-21, 22-18, 27-14, 19-30

Ostend

November 13
20:30

UPIM Bologna (Italy)	82–71	(Czech Republic) CEZ Nymburk
Scoring by quarter: 15-17, 24-15, 19-19, 24-20

Bologna

=== Game 3 ===
November 20, 2007

November 20
18:00

CEZ Nymburk (Czech Republic)	75–65	(Greece) Panellinios GS
Scoring by quarter: 17-14, 17-24, 14-14, 27-13

Nymburk

November 20
18:15

Dynamo Moscow (Russia)	97–76	(Serbia) Red Star
Scoring by quarter: 27-23, 17-15, 32-14, 21-24

Moscow

November 20
20:30

UPIM Bologna (Italy)	76–89	(Belgium) Telindus BC
Scoring by quarter: 11-20, 25-22, 21-25, 19-22

Bologna

=== Game 4 ===
November 27, 2007

November 27
17:30

Panellinios GS (Greece)	76–83	(Russia) Dynamo Moscow
Scoring by quarter: 28-18, 14-30, 21-14, 13-21

Kypseli

November 27
18:00

CEZ Nymburk (Czech Republic)	81–75	(Belgium) Telindus BC
Scoring by quarter: 25-20, 15-18, 19-16, 22-21

Nymburk

November 27
19:00

Red Star (Serbia)	99–66	(Italy) UPIM Bologna
Scoring by quarter: 29-15, 28-17, 24-12, 18-22

Belgrade

=== Game 5 ===
December 4, 2007

December 4
18:15

Dynamo Moscow (Russia)	94–83	(Czech Republic) CEZ Nymburk
Scoring by quarter: 19-21, 23-16, 24-17, 28-29

Moscow

December 4
20:30

UPIM Bologna (Italy)	83–59	(Greece) Panellinios GS
Scoring by quarter: 19-18, 23-18, 19-10, 22-13

Bologna

December 4
20:30

Telindus BC (Belgium)	72–73	(Serbia) Red Star
Scoring by quarter: 16-25, 22-16, 15-11, 19-21

Ostend

=== Game 6 ===
December 11, 2007

December 11
19:00

Red Star (Serbia)	74–96	(Czech Republic) CEZ Nymburk
Scoring by quarter: 19-26, 19-22, 23-23, 13-25

Belgrade

December 11
20:30

Telindus BC (Belgium)	83–71	(Greece) Panellinios GS
Scoring by quarter: 21-24, 22-13, 17-16, 23-18

Ostend

December 11
20:30

UPIM Bologna (Italy)	81–62	(Russia) Dynamo Moscow
Scoring by quarter: 14-11, 30-18, 22-17, 15-16

Bologna

=== Game 7 ===
December 18, 2007

December 18
17:30

Panellinios GS (Greece)	81–83	(Serbia) Red Star
Scoring by quarter: 30-20, 15-21, 16-19, 20-23

Kypseli

December 18
18:00

CEZ Nymburk (Czech Republic)	82–70	(Italy) UPIM Bologna
Scoring by quarter: 21-17, 22-16, 20-22, 19-15

Nymburk

December 18
18:15

Dynamo Moscow (Russia)	104–84	(Belgium) Telindus BC
Scoring by quarter: 26-18, 24-22, 25-23, 29-21

Moscow

=== Game 8 ===
January 8, 2008

January 8
17:30

Panellinios GS (Greece)	77–86	(Czech Republic) CEZ Nymburk
Scoring by quarter: 13-21, 14-23, 21-16, 29-26

Kypseli

January 8
19:00

Red Star (Serbia)	98–104	(Russia) Dynamo Moscow
Scoring by quarter: 26-26, 31-37, 23-17, 18-24

Belgrade

January 8
20:30

Telindus BC (Belgium)	62–60	(Italy) UPIM Bologna
Scoring by quarter: 13-15, 19-13, 19-10, 11-22

Ostend

=== Game 9 ===
January 15, 2008

January 15
18:15

Dynamo Moscow (Russia)	107–73	(Greece) Panellinios GS
Scoring by quarter: 40-20, 17-24, 24-12, 26-17

Moscow

January 15
20:30

UPIM Bologna (Italy)	76–77	(Serbia) Red Star
Scoring by quarter: 18-15, 21-24, 21-18, 10-13

Bologna

January 15
20:30

Telindus BC (Belgium)	83–81	(Czech Republic) CEZ Nymburk
Scoring by quarter: 16-14, 2-27, 8-16, 33-24

Ostend

=== Game 10 ===
January 22, 2008

January 22
17:45

CEZ Nymburk (Czech Republic)	83–88	(Russia) Dynamo Moscow
Scoring by quarter: 22-23, 13-19, 18-21, 30-25

Nymburk

January 22
17:45

Panellinios GS (Greece)	67–85	(Italy) UPIM Bologna
Scoring by quarter: 11-19, 20-16, 19-28, 17-22

Kypseli

January 22
17:45

Red Star (Serbia)	86–100	(Belgium) Telindus BC
Scoring by quarter: 20-31, 22-27, 13-17, 31-25

Belgrade
