= Survivor Greece season 12 =

Survivor Greece
- Season 12
- Presented by: Giorgos Lianos
- No. of days: 92
- No. of castaways: 25
- Winner: Ninos Nikolaidis
- Runner-up: Giannis Alkeo Keli
- Location: La Romana, Dominican Republic
- No. of episodes: 61

Release
- Original network: Skai TV
- Original release: September 16 – December 12, 2024

Additional information
- Filming dates: September 13 – December 12, 2024

Season chronology
- ← Previous; Season 11 Next → Season 13

The twelfth season of the reality show Survivor Greece premiered on September 16, 2024, on Skai TV in Greece and (via simulcast) on Sigma TV in Cyprus. Giorgos Lianos returned as host for his seventh consecutive season. In August 2024, the official trailer was released, announcing the show's return. This season marks the first time the show has premiered earlier than January.

The format of the game changed significantly from previous seasons, as the producers decided to follow the Mexican version of the show, which is also produced by Acun Medya. The teams were renamed and given new colors: The yellow team became the Tigers, and the green team became the Eagles.

== Contestants ==
The game began with eighteen contestants, divided into two teams: the Tigers (yellow) and the Eagles (green).

In the second episode, five new contestants—Christiana Grigoraskou, Mairi Peteinari, Maria Kerasioti, Michalis Kondylas, and Vladimiros Siikis—joined Ekaterina on Exile Island, awaiting their entry into the game.

In episode 7, Ekaterina was informed that she would be returning to the game. As the teams prepared to compete, Ekaterina made her entrance, leaving everyone speechless. She and Giorgos Lianos informed the players about Exile Island and that five new contestants would soon be joining the game. Ekaterina rejoined her former team, the Eagles, and the five new players arrived. The teams then competed for a reward, which also included the first pick of a new player to join their team. The green team won and chose Mairi Peteinari, Vicky's twin sister, while the yellow team selected Vladimiros. Christiana, Maria, and Michalis returned to Exile Island.

In episode 8, Michalis and Maria returned once again to enter the game. Giorgos Lianos announced that Christiana had decided to leave the show. The yellow team won and chose Paraskevi's sister, while Maria and Michalis joined the green team. Later, Christiana changed her mind and rejoined the yellow team.

In episode 12, Giannis Grymanelis decided to leave the game voluntarily. Giorgos Lianos announced that two new contestants—a man and a woman—would soon join the yellow team, marking the final additions to the cast.

In episode 13, Vladimiros from the yellow team and Orfeas from the green team switched tribes following a decision made by their team leaders.

In episode 14, Giannis Keli entered the game.

In episode 19, Stefania Glara was added to the yellow team, becoming the final addition to the cast.

Contestant	Original tribe	Switched tribe 1	Switched tribe 2	Switched tribe 3	Merged tribe	Statistics	Finished
Tasos Panas; 38, Athens, Trainer	Tigers					53%	Walked; Episode 5
Gesthimani Koutouzoglou; 36, Thessaloniki, Special Forces NCO	Tigers					47%	Walked; Episode 8
Paraskevi Kerasioti; 23, Patras, Model	Tigers					27%	Walked; Episode 10
Maria Kerasioti; 25, Patras, Trainer	Tigers					0%	1st Eliminated; Episode 10
Giannis Grimanelis; 31, Athens, Welder	Tigers					55%	Walked; Episode 12
Stefanos Vlachos; 20, Athens, Nurse	Eagles	Eagles				23%	2nd Eliminated; Episode 15
Aggeliki Katsini; 36, Athens, Journalist	Eagles	Eagles				53%	3rd Eliminated; Episode 20
Panagiotis Tsakalakos; 45, Athens, Musician, Singer	Tigers	Tigers				48%	4th Eliminated; Episode 25
Ekaterina Litvinova; 26, Thessaloniki, Actress, Tik Toker	Eagles	Eagles				44%	5th Eliminated; Episode 30
Vladimiros Siikis; 36, Paphos, Businessman	Tigers	Eagles	Tigers			39%	6th Eliminated; Episode 35
Apostolos Mixail; 30, Limassol, Content Creator	Eagles	Eagles	Eagles			36%	7th Eliminated; Episode 40
Mairi Peteinari; 20, Kalamata, Model	Eagles	Eagles	Eagles	Tigers		51%	8th Eliminated; Episode 49
Maria Lymperopoulou; 23, Athens, Marketing Director	Tigers	Tigers	Tigers	Tigers		52%	9th Eliminated; Episode 51
Georgia Georgopoulou; 50, Athens, Event Planner	Tigers	Tigers	Tigers	Tigers		38%	10th Eliminated; Episode 53
Michalis Kondylas; 24, Syros, Journalist	Eagles	Eagles	Eagles	Tigers	Merged Tribe	39%	11th Eliminated; Episode 57
Phoebe Delikoura; 27, Athens, Actress	Tigers	Tigers	Eagles	Eagles	Merged Tribe	55%	12th Eliminated; Episode 58
Eleni Katsara; 34, Thessaloniki, Trainer	Eagles	Eagles	Eagles	Eagles	Merged Tribe	50%	13th Eliminated; Episode 58
Christiana Grigoraskou; 22, Athens, Fitness Champion	Tigers	Tigers	Tigers	Eagles	Merged Tribe	45%	14th Eliminated; Episode 59
Vicky Peteinari; 20, Kalamata, Model	Eagles	Eagles	Eagles	Tigers	Merged Tribe	49%	15th Eliminated; Episode 59
Aggelos Tsakas; 32, Larissa, Dancer	Eagles	Eagles	Eagles	Eagles	Merged Tribe	54%	16th Eliminated; Episode 60
Orfeas Genkianidis; 24, Athens, Content Creator	Eagles	Tigers	Tigers	Eagles	Merged Tribe	54%	17th Eliminated; Episode 60
Stefania Glara; 23, Kalabaka, Martal Arts Trainer		Tigers	Tigers	Eagles	Merged Tribe	61%	18th Eliminated; Episode 61
John Rigakis; 39, Athens, DJ, Event Manager	Eagles	Eagles	Eagles	Tigers	Merged Tribe	44%	19th Eliminated; Episode 61
Giannis Alkeo Keli; 31, Athens, Crossfit Trainer		Tigers	Tigers	Eagles	Merged Tribe	62%	Runner Up; Episode 61
Ninos Nikolaidis; 26, Volos, World Rowing Champion	Tigers	Tigers	Tigers	Tigers	Merged Tribe	55%	Sole Survivor; Episode 61

== Nominations table ==
	Original tribes						Switched tribe 1						Switched tribe 2				Switched tribe 3								Merged Tribe					
Week #	1		2		3		4		5		6		7		8		9		10		11				12		13			
Episodes #	1-5		6-10		11-15		16-20		21-25		26-30		31-35		36-40		41-45		46-49		50-53				54-57		58	59	60	FINAL
Team Leaders	Giannis	Eleni	Giannis	John	Ninos	John	Ninos	John	Ninos	Aggelos	Ninos	Aggelos	Ninos	Aggelos	Ninos	Aggelos	Ninos	Aggelos	Ninos	Aggelos	Ninos		Aggelos		Ninos	Michalis	None			
Losing Tribe	Tigers		Tigers		Eagles		Eagles		Tigers		Eagles		Tigers		Eagles		Tigers		Tigers		Tigers		Tigers		Merge					
Nominated by Group	Tasos; Georgia		Vladimiros; Georgia		Michalis; Stefanos		Ekaterina; Michalis		Panagiotis; Phoebe		Ekaterina; Michalis		Georgia; Christiana		Phoebe; Eleni		Georgia; John		Georgia; John		Georgia; Michalis		~~Michalis~~**; Georgia		Eleni; Michalis; Vicky		Eleni; Phoebe; Christiana; Orfeas	John; Christiana; Vicky	John; Orfeas; Aggelos	
Vote split	7-1		3-3-2-1		5-3-2-1		6-3-1		4-3-2		6-2-1		7-1		4-3-1		3-3-1		3-3-1		3-2-1		3-1-1		5-3-3		3-2-2-2-1	3-3-2	4-1-1	
Exile Island	Ekaterina		None				Georgia	Vladimiros	Panagiotis	Ekaterina	Phoebe	Michalis	Georgia	Eleni	None															
Individual Immunity	None		Ninos	Orfeas	Christiana	Eleni	Ninos	John	Georgia	Michalis	Ninos	Vladimiros	Orfeas	Apostolos	Christiana	Michalis	Ninos	Giannis K.	Michalis	Orfeas	John	Christiana	Vicky	Eleni	Ninos	Giannis K.	Giannis K.	Ninos	Stefania	
Nominated by Immune	None		Maria K.		Vladimiros		Aggeliki		Christiana		Eleni		Vladimiros		Apostolos		Mairi		Mairi		Maria L.		Ninos**		None					
Eliminated in Challenge	None		Maria K.		Stefanos		Aggeliki		Panagiotis		Ekaterina		Vladimiros		Apostolos		None*		Mairi		Maria L.		Georgia		Michalis		Phoebe; Eleni	Christiana; Vicky	Aggelos; Orfeas	
Voter	Vote																													
Ninos	Tasos		Georgia						Panagiotis				Georgia				Georgia		Georgia		Georgia		Michalis		Michalis		Christiana	Christiana	Aggelos	WINNER
Giannis K.	Not competing yet								Panagiotis				Georgia												Eleni		Eleni	Vicky	John	Runner Up
John					Stefanos		Michalis				Ekaterina				Phoebe		Georgia		Georgia		Georgia		Georgia		Michalis		Phoebe	Christiana	Orfeas	Eliminated
Stefania	Not competing yet								Panagiotis				Georgia												Eleni		Eleni	John	John	Eliminated
Orfeas									Panagiotis				Georgia												Eleni		Phoebe	John	John	Eliminated
Aggelos					Ekaterina		Ekaterina				Ekaterina				Eleni										Eleni		Eleni	John	John	Eliminated
Vicky					Michalis		Michalis				Michalis				Phoebe		John		John		Michalis		Michalis		Michalis		Christiana	Christiana	Eliminated	
Christiana	Exile Island		Vladimiros						Phoebe				Georgia												Eleni		Ninos	Vicky	Eliminated	
Eleni					Stefanos		Ekaterina				Ekaterina				Phoebe										Vicky		Orfeas	Eliminated		
Phoebe	Tasos		Christiana						Christiana						Eleni										Vicky		Orfeas	Eliminated		
Michalis	Exile Island				Vicky		Ekaterina				Ekaterina				Vicky		John		John		Georgia		John		Vicky		Eliminated			
Georgia	Tasos		Christiana						Phoebe				Christiana				Maria L.		Maria L.		Maria L.		Michalis		Eliminated					
Maria L.	Tasos		Vladimiros						Phoebe				Georgia				Georgia		John		Michalis		Eliminated							
Mairi	Exile Island				Michalis		Michalis				Michalis				Eleni		John		Georgia		Eliminated									
Apostolos					Ekaterina		Ekaterina				Ekaterina				Phoebe		Eliminated													
Vladimiros	Exile Island		Georgia		Stefanos		Ekaterina				Ekaterina		Georgia		Eliminated															
Ekaterina	Exile Island				Michalis		Vladimiros				Eleni		Eliminated																	
Panagiotis	Tasos		Vladimiros						Christiana		Eliminated																			
Aggeliki					Michalis		Ekaterina		Eliminated																					
Stefanos					Michalis		Eliminated																							
Giannis G.	Tasos		Maria K.		Walked																									
Maria K.	Exile Island		Georgia		Eliminated																									
Paraskevi	Tasos		Walked																											
Gesthimani	Tasos		Walked																											
Tasos	Georgia		Walked																											

In the first episode, although the teams did not compete in an immunity challenge, one player from each team was nominated: Maria Lymperopoulou from the Tigers and Ekaterina Lidvinova from the Eagles.

After competing in a challenge, Maria won, and Ekaterina was eliminated. After leaving, she found a note informing her that she was not leaving the game but instead moving to Exile Island.

- Mairi Peteinari lost the elimination challenge, but she used the totem of reset (given to her by Aggelos) and she cancelled her elimination.
  - At the final council before the merge, Vicky had won the individual immunity. Michalis was nominated, but he played his immunity idol and he was saved. Eleni from the green team gave her idol to John who decided to play it for himself. Georgia with one vote was nominated along with Ninos who also had no immunity.

== Rewards Results ==
Episode			Winner	Score	Reward
Week	No.	Air date	Winner	Score	Reward
1	1	September 16, 2024	Tigers	-	Fire kit
1	1	September 16, 2024	Tigers	3-2	Food Supplies
1	2	September 17, 2024	Eagles	3-2	Tools
1	2	September 17, 2024	Eagles	3-1	Eggs
1	3	September 18, 2024	Tigers	5-3	Croissants
1	3	September 18, 2024	Tigers	2-0	Fishing Kit
1	4	September 19, 2024	Eagles	3-2	Potatoes
1	5	September 20, 2024	Eagles	7-3	Immunity
2	6	September 23, 2024	Tigers	3-1	Food Supplies
2	6	September 23, 2024	Eagles	3-0	Omelette
2	7	September 24, 2024	Tigers	4-2	Shelter Roof Cover
2	7	September 24, 2024	Eagles	2-1	Coffee, cookies and selection of new player
2	8	September 25, 2024	Tigers	5-4	Fruits and selection of new player
2	9	September 26, 2024	Eagles	3-0	Donuts
2	10	September 27, 2024	Eagles	2-1	Immunity
3	11	September 30, 2024	Eagles	3-1	Food Supplies
3	11	September 30, 2024	Tigers	3-2	Empanadas
3	12	October 1, 2024	Tigers	3-1	Tools for shelter improvements
3	12	October 1, 2024	Eagles	3-1	Cheese Pies
3	13	October 2, 2024	Eagles	5-4	Hot Dogs, beverages and family letters
3	14	October 3, 2024	Eagles	4-1	Trip to Punta Cana
3	15	October 4, 2024	Tigers	10-2	Immunity
4	16	October 7, 2024	Tigers	3-1	Food Supplies
4	16	October 7, 2024	Eagles	7-3	Breakfast
4	17	October 8, 2024	Eagles	3-0	Tea and carrot cake
4	17	October 8, 2024	Eagles	6-3	Burgers with fries and salad
4	18	October 9, 2024	Tigers	7-6	Cruise at the Caribbean
4	19	October 10, 2024	Tigers	6-5	Communication Reward and waffles
4	20	October 11, 2024	Tigers	5-1	Immunity
5	21	October 14, 2024	Tigers	3-2	Double Bed
5	21	October 14, 2024	Eagles	5-2	Food Supplies
5	22	October 15, 2024	Tigers	3-1	Gyros
5	22	October 15, 2024	Tigers	5-2	Moussaka
5	23	October 16, 2024	Eagles	7-5	Restaurant Meal
5	24	October 17, 2024	Tigers	7-1	Communication Reward
5	25	October 18, 2024	Eagles	5-0	Immunity
6	26	October 21, 2024	Eagles	5-3	Food Supplies
6	26	October 21, 2024	Tigers	5-2	Gemista
6	27	October 22, 2024	Tigers	4-2	Salad
6	27	October 22, 2024	Tigers	5-3	Picnic
6	28	October 23, 2024	Eagles	5-4	Movie Night
6	29	October 24, 2024	Tigers	5-1	Communication reward and Tarts
6	30	October 25, 2024	Tigers	4-1	Immunity
7	31	October 28, 2024	Tigers	4-2	Food Supplies
7	31	October 28, 2024	Eagles	5-3	Lamb Chops
7	32	October 29, 2024	Eagles	4-2	Corn Dogs
7	32	October 29, 2024	Tigers	4-1	Buffet
7	33	October 30, 2024	Tigers	7-3	Villa pool party
7	34	October 31, 2024	Tigers	5-4	Kolokithokeftedes and Loukoumades
7	35	November 1, 2024	Eagles	5-0	Immunity
8	36	November 4, 2024	Eagles	5-3	Food supplies
8	36	November 4, 2024	Tigers	5-0	Kleftiko
8	37	November 5, 2024	Eagles	3-0	Burritos
8	37	November 5, 2024	Tigers	5-3	Chicken with mashed potatoes
8	38	November 6, 2024	Tigers	8-3	Trip to Panama
8	39	November 7, 2024	Tigers	6-4	Communication reward and Tarts
8	40	November 8, 2024	Tigers	7-6	Immunity
9	41	November 11, 2024	Tigers	3-2	Food Supplies
9	41	November 11, 2024	Eagles	4-1	Lahmacun
9	42	November 12, 2024	Eagles	4-2	Souvlaki
9	42	November 12, 2024	Tigers	5-3	Lunch
9	43	November 13, 2024	Eagles	6-2	Villa party & massage
9	44	November 14, 2024	Tigers	6-5	Communication Reward
9	45	November 15, 2024	Eagles	5-4	Immunity
10	46	November 18, 2024	Eagles	3-0	Food supplies
10	46	November 18, 2024	Eagles	4-2	Papoutsakia
10	47	November 19, 2024	Eagles	5-1	Tiramisu with coffee
10	47	November 19, 2024	Eagles	5-1	Seafood plate & pineapple juice
10	48	November 20, 2024	Eagles	5-2	Communication reward
10	49	November 21, 2024	Eagles	6-2	Immunity
11	50	November 25, 2024	Eagles	5-4	Food supplies
11	50	November 25, 2024	Eagles	5-4	Villa party
11	51	November 26, 2024	Eagles	5-2	Immunity
11	52	November 27, 2024	Eagles	4-2	Profiterole
11	52	November 27, 2024	Eagles	7-5	Communication reward
11	53	November 28, 2024	Eagles	5-3	Immunity
12	54	December 2, 2024	Orfeas; Vicky	-	Merge Party - Song Contest
12	55	December 3, 2024	Stefania	-	Pastitsio (shared with Orfeas and Ninos)
12	55	December 3, 2024	Tigers	6-5	Communication Reward
12	56	December 4, 2024	Eagles	5-4	Lunch
12	57	December 5, 2024	Tigers	-	Communication Reward
13	58	December 9, 2024	Giannis K.	-	Immunity & lunch (shared with Orfeas and Aggelos)
13	59	December 10, 2024	Ninos	-	Immunity & lunch (shared with Vicky and Stefania)
13	60	December 11, 2024	Stefania	-	Immunity & lunch (shared with Orfeas and Ninos)

== Finals ==
Episode	Result	Notes
61	Giannis K. John; Ninos; ~~Stefania~~	The final four players competed on a game, Stefania came last and was eliminated and she became the last member of the jury.
61	Giannis K. Ninos; ~~John~~	The jury members voted for Giannis K. to go straight to the finals. John and Nino competed on a game. Nino won and John was eliminated.
61	Ninos Nikolaidis	At the final Ninos defeated Giannis K. with a 3-0 score and he was named Sole Survivor. Season finale

Jury Vote
Episode	61		
Finalist	Giannis K.	John	Ninos
Votes	6–2–0		
Juror	Vote		
Aggelos	Yes		
Christiana	Yes		
Eleni		Yes	
Michalis	Yes		
Orfeas	Yes		
Phoebe	Yes		
Stefania	Yes		
Vicky		Yes	

== Ratings ==
Official ratings are taken from AGB Hellas.

Week	Episode	Air date	Timeslot (EET)	Ratings	Viewers (in millions)	Rank		Share		Source
Week	Episode	Air date	Timeslot (EET)	Ratings	Viewers (in millions)	Daily	Weekly	Household	Adults 18-54	Source
1	1	September 16, 2024	Monday 9:00pm	8.4%	0.843	#1	#2	23%	18.6%	
1	2	September 17, 2024	Tuesday 10:15pm	6.0%	0.607	#1	#9	20.4%	15.2%	
1	3	September 18, 2024	Wednesday 10:15pm	6.5%	0.657	#1	#4	21.6%	17.8%	
1	4	September 19, 2024	Thursday 10:15pm	6.6%	0.664	#1	#3	22.3%	17.2%	
1	5	September 20, 2024	Friday 9:00pm	5.5%	0.557	#2	#17	15.8%	13.2%	
2	6	September 23, 2024	Monday 10:15pm	-	-	-	-	11.3%	12.2%	
2	7	September 24, 2024	Tuesday 10:15pm	4.6%	0.463	#8	-	11.9%	15.3%	
2	8	September 25, 2024	Wednesday 10:15pm	4.6%	0.462	#7	-	11%	15.2%	
2	9	September 26, 2024	Thursday 10:15pm	4.3%	0.432	#8	-	9.4%	14.1%	
2	10	September 27, 2024	Friday 10:15pm	4.4%	0.447	#6	-	10.1%	16.3%	
3	11	September 30, 2024	Monday 10:15pm	-	-	-	-	12%	9.3%	
3	12	October 1, 2024	Tuesday 10:15pm	-	-	-	-	11.2	9%	
3	13	October 2, 2024	Wednesday 10:15pm	-	-	-	-	11.1%	8.8%	
3	14	October 3, 2024	Thursday 10:15pm	-	-	-	-	10.5%	8.1%	
3	15	October 4, 2024	Friday 10:15pm	4.1%	0.414	#8	-	13.5%	9.8%	
4	16	October 7, 2024	Monday 10:15pm	-	-	-	-	10.8%	8.4%	
4	17	October 8, 2024	Tuesday 10:15pm	-	-	-	-	11.1%	9.2%	
4	18	October 9, 2024	Wednesday 10:15pm	-	-	-	-	9.3%	7.3%	
4	19	October 10, 2024	Thursday 10:15pm	-	-	-	-	10%	7.3%	
4	20	October 11, 2024	Friday 10:15pm	-	-	-	-	10.4%	9.2%	
5	21	October 14, 2024	Monday 10:15pm	-	-	-	-	7.6%	9.2%	
5	22	October 15, 2024	Tuesday 10:15pm	-	-	-	-	10.1%	6.7%	
5	23	October 16, 2024	Wednesday 10:15pm	-	-	-	-	11.6%	9.8%	
5	24	October 17, 2024	Thursday 10:15pm	-	-	-	-	10.1%	7.7%	
5	25	October 18, 2024	Friday 10:15pm	-	-	-	-	11.8%	7.9%	
6	26	October 21, 2024	Monday 10:15pm	-	-	-	-	8.7%	7%	
6	27	October 22, 2024	Tuesday 10:15pm	-	-	-	-	10.3%	8.6%	
6	28	October 23, 2024	Wednesday 10:15pm	-	-	-	-	11.1%	8.5%	
6	29	October 24, 2024	Thursday 10:15pm	-	-	-	-	11.1%	7.7%	
6	30	October 25, 2024	Friday 10:15pm	-	-	-	-	9.9%	6.2%	
7	31	October 28, 2024	Monday 10:15pm	-	-	-	-	8.6%	7.1%	
7	32	October 29, 2024	Tuesday 10:15pm	-	-	-	-	8.9%	7.5%	
7	33	October 30, 2024	Wednesday 10:15pm	-	-	-	-	8.1%	6.7%	
7	34	October 31, 2024	Thursday 10:15pm	-	-	-	-	9.8%	6.9%	
7	35	November 1, 2024	Friday 10:15pm	-	-	-	-	7.6%	4.6%	
8	36	November 4, 2024	Monday 10:15pm	-	-	-	-	7.5%	5.9%	
8	37	November 5, 2024	Tuesday 10:15pm	-	-	-	-	5.8%	4.7%	
8	38	November 6, 2024	Wednesday 10:15pm	-	-	-	-	6.9%	3.6%	
8	39	November 7, 2024	Thursday 10:15pm	-	-	-	-	7.6%	5%	
8	40	November 8, 2024	Friday 10:15pm	-	-	-	-	8.3%	5.4%	
9	41	November 11, 2024	Monday 10:15pm	-	-	-	-	8%	6.2%	
9	42	November 12, 2024	Tuesday 10:15pm	-	-	-	-	7.8%	5.1%	
9	43	November 13, 2024	Wednesday 10:15pm	-	-	-	-	7%	5.2%	
9	44	November 14, 2024	Thursday 10:15pm	-	-	-	-	6.3%	4%	
9	45	November 15, 2024	Friday 10:15pm	-	-	-	-	7.7%	4.1%	
10	46	November 18, 2024	Monday 10:15pm	-	-	-	-	8.4%	6%	
10	47	November 19, 2024	Tuesday 10:00pm	-	-	-	-	8%	6,1%	
10	48	November 20, 2024	Wednesday 9:00pm	-	-	-	-	5.6%	4,2%	
10	49	November 21, 2024	Thursday 9:00pm	-	-	-	-	6%	4,2%	
11	50	November 25, 2024	Monday 10:15pm	-	-	-	-	7.6%	5.9%	
11	51	November 26, 2024	Tuesday 9:00pm	-	-	-	-	6%	3.6%	
11	52	November 27, 2024	Wednesday 9:00pm	-	-	-	-	5.5%	3.2%	
11	53	November 28, 2024	Thursday 9:00pm	-	-	-	-	6.8%	3.9%	
12	54	December 2, 2024	Monday 10:15pm	-	-	-	-	9.1%	5.2%	MERGE PARTY
12	55	December 3, 2024	Tuesday 9:00pm	-	-	-	-	8.5%	4.9%	
12	56	December 4, 2024	Wednesday 9:00pm	-	-	-	-	5.1%	2.5%	
12	57	December 5, 2024	Thursday 9:00pm	-	-	-	-	7.8%	4.9%	
13	58	December 9, 2024	Monday 10:15pm	-	-	-	-	7.5%	4.2%	
13	59	December 10, 2024	Tuesday 9:00pm	-	-	-	-	4.6%	2.6%	
13	60	December 11, 2024	Wednesday 9:00pm	-	-	-	-	6.3%	3.3%	
13	61	December 12, 2024	Thursday 9:00pm	-	-	-	-	8.1%	4%	FINAL
