= Omorfokklisia =

12th-century church in Galatsi, Greece

Coordinates: 38.0289°N 23.7638°E

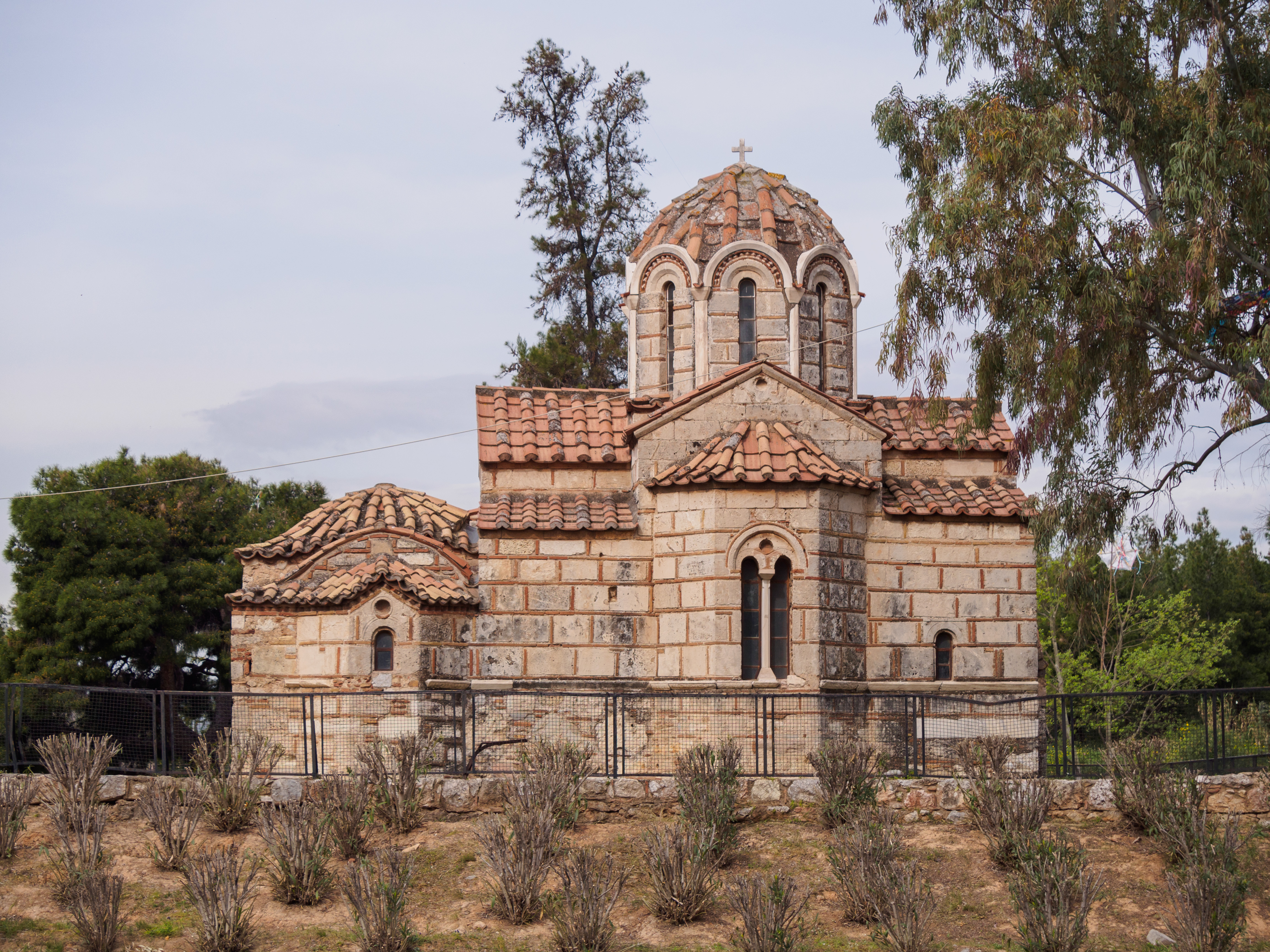
The Omorfokklisia

Omorfokklisia (Greek: Ομορφοκκλησιά, "beautiful church") is a 12th-century Greek Orthodox church in Galatsi, a northeastern suburb of Athens, Greece. This church dedicated to Saint George is considered one of the landmarks of the area.

== History ==
It is estimated that the church was built in the second half of the 12th century over an earlier Christian temple, which in turn had been built over an earlier pagan temple. Around the church, Greek antiquities have been found as well as ancient human remains and it is probable that an ancient cemetery existed nearby.

== Art ==
The church was decorated with wall paintings in the last quarter of the 13th century. Because of the stunning beauty of the icons and wall paintings housed within the church, it has been labeled as a "museum of hagiography".

Some of the scenery found on the walls, are images from the life of St. George and from the Old Testament, while on the ceiling, the image of Jesus Christ is found. Other images of prophets, angels and other saints can be found throughout.
