= Tourkovounia =

Hill range in Athens, Greece

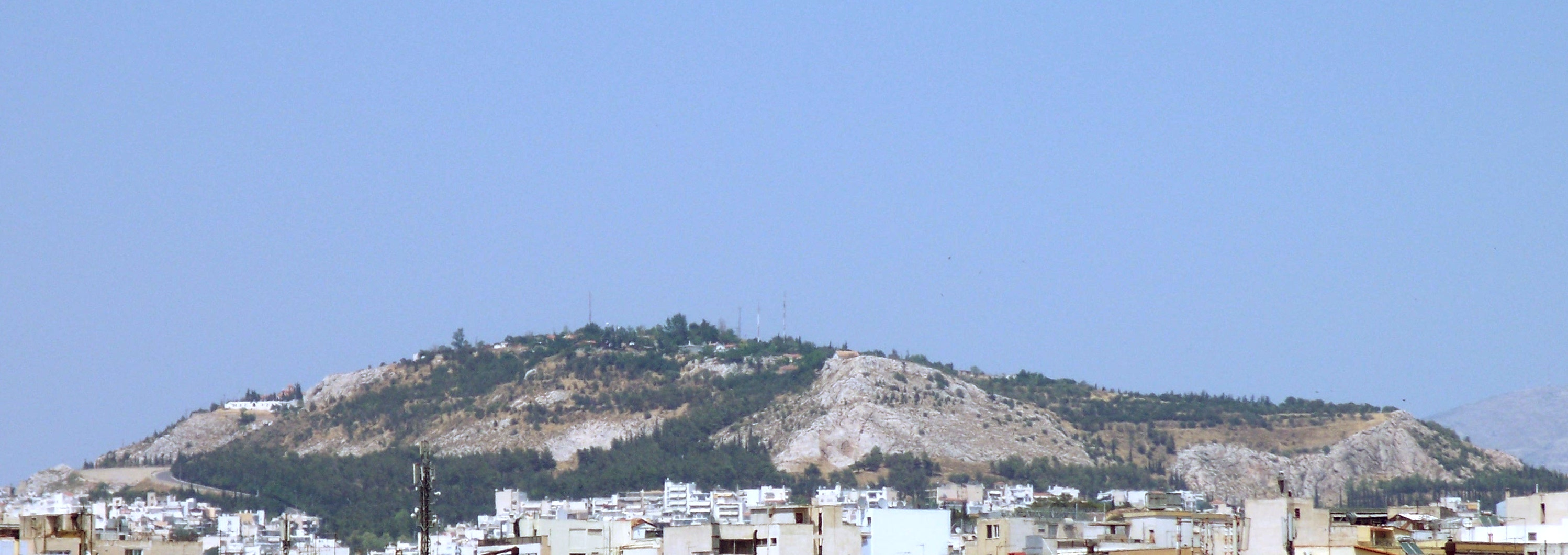
The Tourkovounia seen from the slopes of Philopappos Hill.

The Tourkovounia (Greek: Τουρκοβούνια), also known as Lykovounia (Λυκοβούνια, "wolf mountains") and in Antiquity called Anchesmos (Ἀγχεσμός), is a hill range in Athens, Attica. The name has also been transferred to a neighbourhood in Central Athens and a neighbourhood in Keratsini.

Tourkovounia means "Turkish mountains". They are so named because of a large Turkish cemetery that existed there during the Ottoman period in Greece.

The Tourkovounia are the tallest and most extensive hill range in central Attica, dividing the Athens basin into eastern and western parts. The range forms the boundary between the municipalities of Galatsi (to the west and northwest), Filothei (to the north) and Psychiko (to the northeast), while the southern part of the range belongs to the municipality of Athens.

The ancient name, Anchesmos, refers to the sharp peaks of the range, while the modern name is said to derive either from a Turkish cemetery during the Ottoman rule or because the troops of Omar Pasha had their camp there in the last years of the Greek War of Independence. In the later 19th century, the hills were the lair of the notorious brigand Kakaras. During the Regime of the Colonels (1967-1974), a huge church dedicated to the Saviour was planned to be built on the hills as a "National Votive", but the project was never carried out.

In ancient times, the Greek god Zeus had an epithet derived from Anchesmos: Zeus Anchesmius (Greek: Ancient Greek: Ἀγχέσμιος). There was a statue of him on the hill.

Today, the Attic Forest, the Youth Center of Galatsi, and the Monastery of prophet Helias are located on the hills. The quarters of Polygono and Panorama Galatsiou are situated on their slopes.
