= Kypseli, Athens =

Kypseli Κυψέλη
- Neighborhood
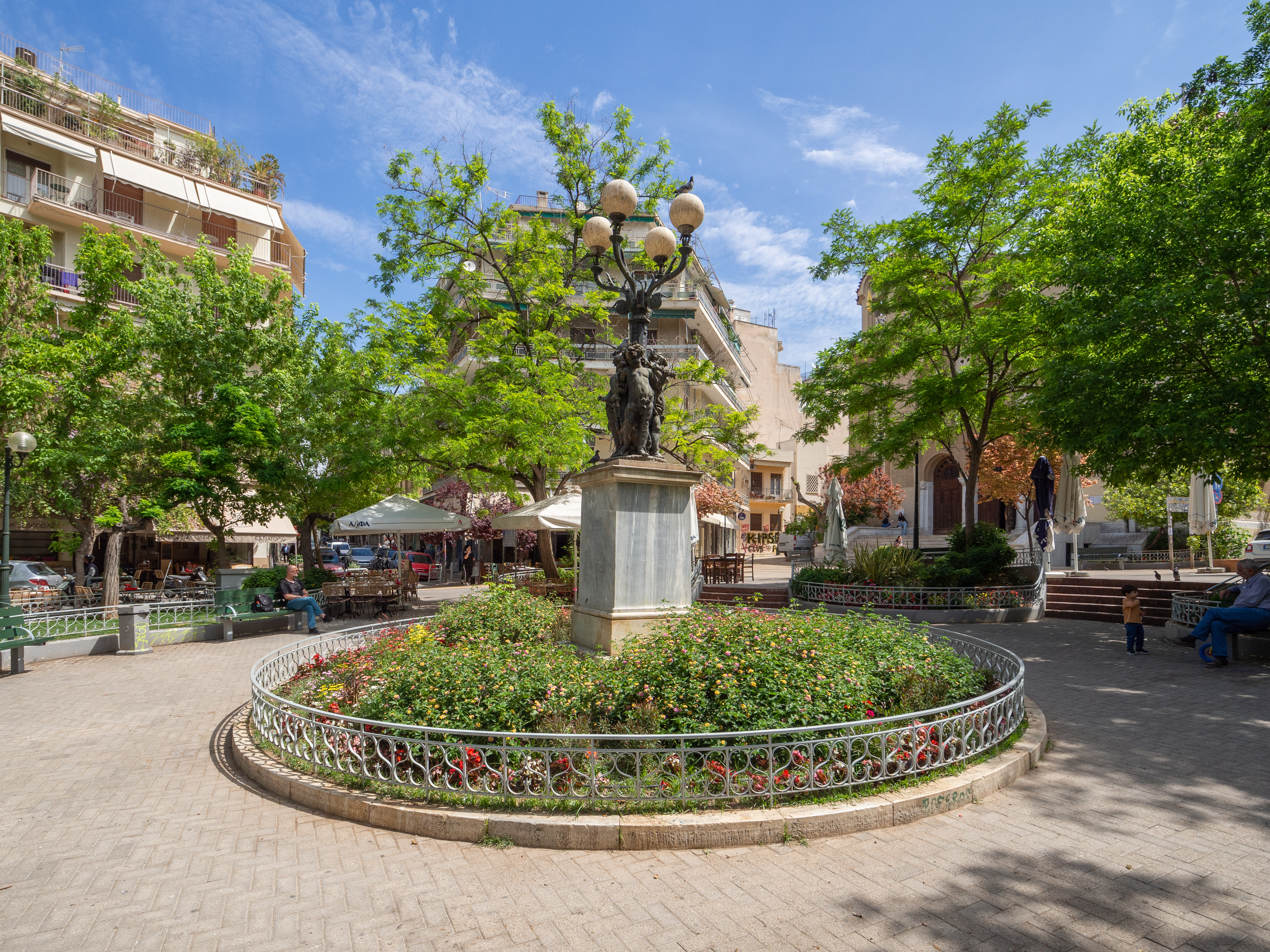
- Agiou Georgiou square, 2022.

- Location within Athens municipality
- Coordinates: 38°00′09″N 23°44′29″E
- Country: Greece
- Region: Attica
- City: Athens
- Website: www.cityofathens.gr

Kypseli (Greek: Κυψέλη, pronounced [ciˈpseli]) is a neighbourhood in central Athens, Greece. It occupies much of the 6th municipal department of the municipality of Athens, and had a population of around 100,000 in 2001.

== Boundaries ==
The boundaries of Kypseli are set by Patission Street at the west, by Tourkovounia hill at the east, by the Municipality of Galatsi at the north and by Pedion Areos park at the south. Extensions of Kypseli are Nea ('New') Kypseli which ends at Gkyzi neighbourhood and Ano ('Upper') Kypseli which borders with Attiko Park, Papandreou neighbourhood and Galatsi.

== Districts ==
1. Ano Kypseli (Agias Zonis, Alepotrypa, Agios Athanasios, Kyprion)
2. Kypseli (Fokionos Negri, Plateia Kanari, Agios Georgios, Polygono)
3. Nea Kypseli (Nea Kypseli I./Dikastiria, Nea Kypseli II./Timios Stavros)

== History and architecture ==
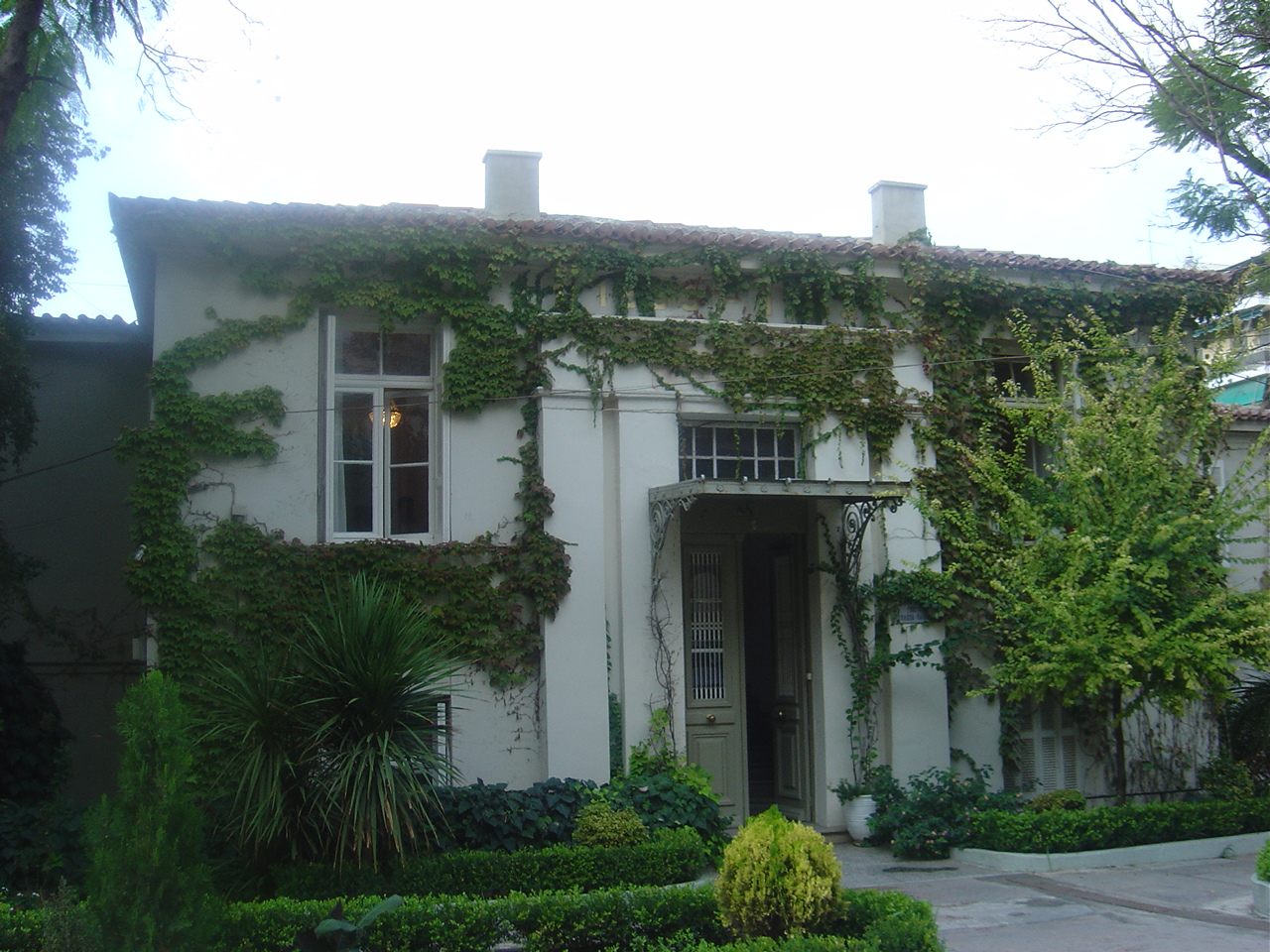
The house of admiral Pulteney Malcolm. Today it houses the House for the Disabled of Athens.

Until 1908, when the county engineer Athanasios Georgiadis first bounded and planned Kypseli, Kypseli was a rural area with estates and country houses. In such a house Konstantinos Kanaris, fighter of the Greek revolution and later prime minister of Greece, lived and died. Also, in 1831, the British admiral Pulteney Malcolm had architects Eduard Schaubert and Stamatios Kleanthis build him a house which now lies on Agias Zonis Street and houses the Hospice for the Disabled of Athens.

A clearly urban development of Kypseli began in the 1930s with the construction of family houses and the first modern apartment buildings in Athens. The development of apartment buildings was contemporary with Kolonaki and other central neighbourhoods. Although many of the earlier houses were built in a neoclassical or eclectic style, from the 1930s onwards, the designs of newer houses and apartment buildings were influenced by international trends such as modernism, Bauhaus and Art Deco. Adjacent large green areas such as Pedion Areos and Fokionos Negri Street pushed Kypseli to become an upmarket district with many apartment buildings built until the 1960s that addressed to the middle and upper-middle class.

In 1937 the municipal market of Kypseli on Fokionos Negri Street, designed by architect Alexandros Metaxas, was inaugurated by the dictator Ioannis Metaxas. Moreover, the shops on the street level made Kypseli a shopping area. Shopping districts were Kypselis Square, Patission Street, Kypselis Street, Fokionos Negri Street and Amerikis Square. During the 1960s Kypseli also had a vibrant nightlife with many theatres and cinemas, restaurants and cafés, bars and clubs.

Beginning in the 1980s many residents of Kypseli moved to the northern suburbs of Athens and, later, immigrants started using the basements and the small apartments of the buildings as cheap residences. Consequently, the value of real estate decreased even if high apartments on Fokionos Negri Street can be sold more expensively in comparison to the rest of the district. Several areas have remained commercial such as Patission and Fokionos Negri Streets and Kypseli is still known for its many theatres.

Gentrification and multiculturalism has seen Kypseli become a popular neighbourhood again in more recent years.

== Transportation ==
Kypseli is served by plenty of bus lines. In the next decade Athens Metro line 4 will have some of its stations in Kypseli.

== Trivia ==
The Greek band Keep Shelly in Athens is named after a pun on Kypseli.

== Sports ==
Kypseli is the seat of Panellinios G.S., which was founded in 1891. Other sport clubs based in Kypseli include Athinais F.C., a football club founded in 1938

== Gallery ==
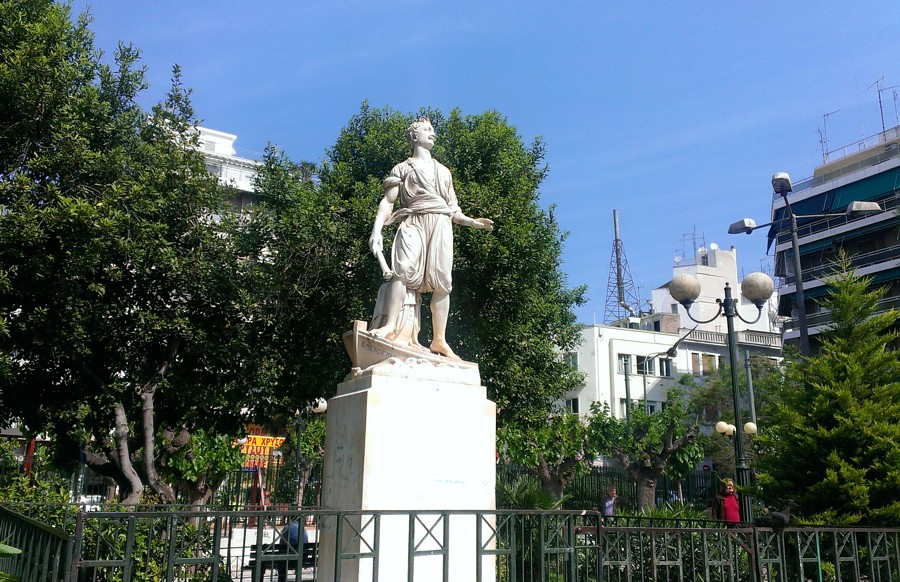
Statue of Konstantinos Kanaris, Kypselis Square.

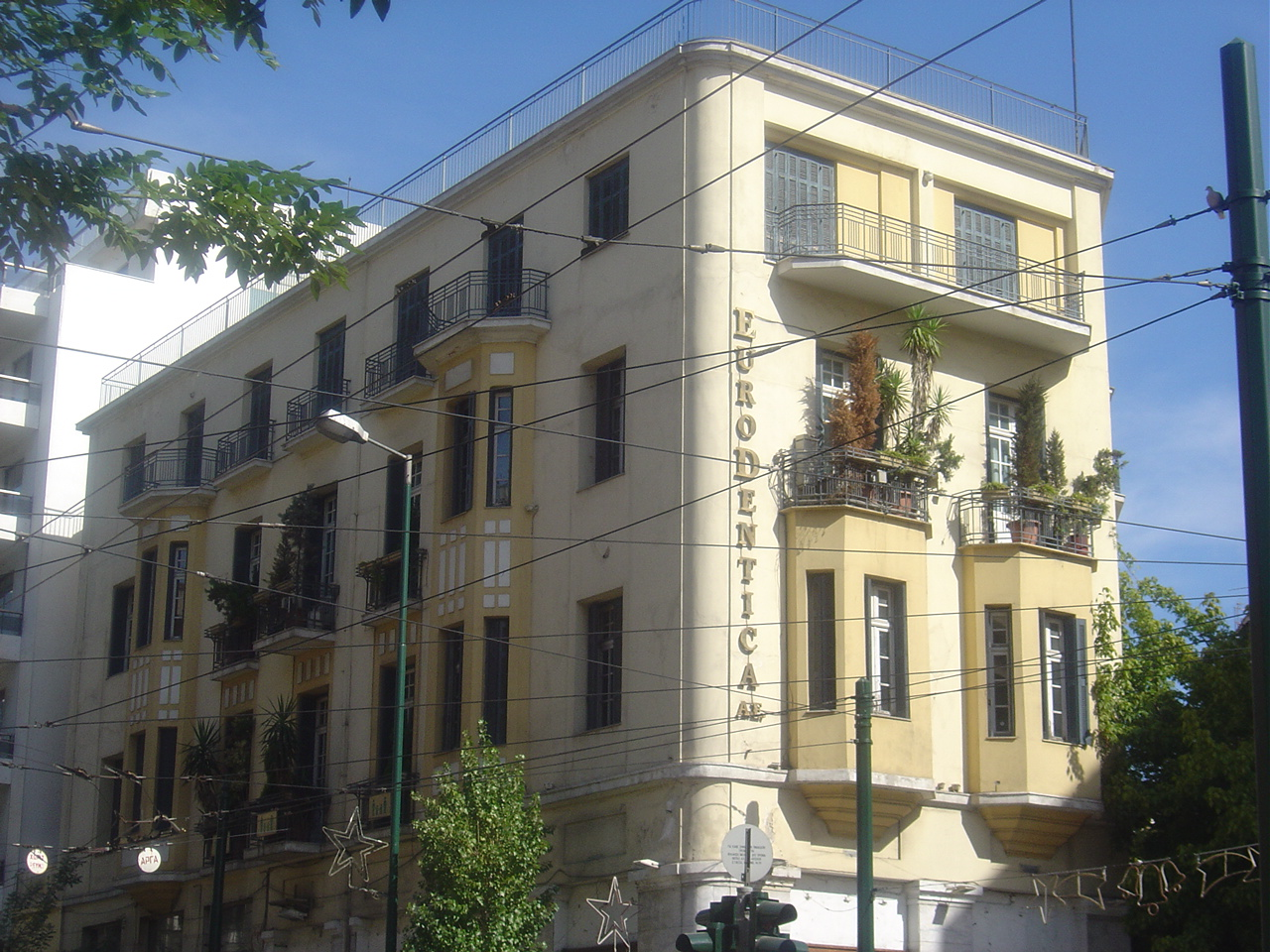
Apartment building and house of Ioannis Metaxas (1928).

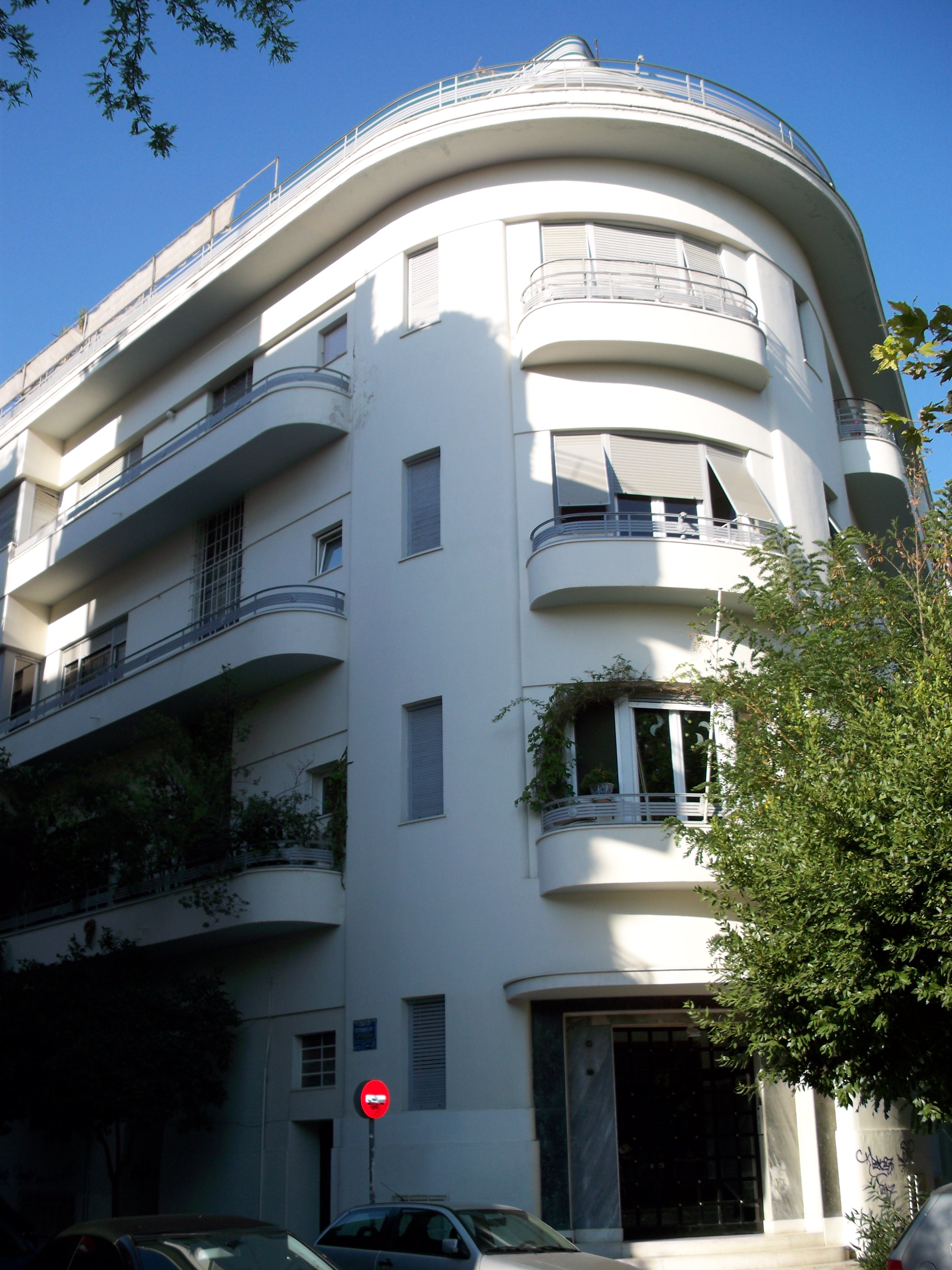
Apartment building built by Ioannis Zolotas for the Lanaras family (1938).

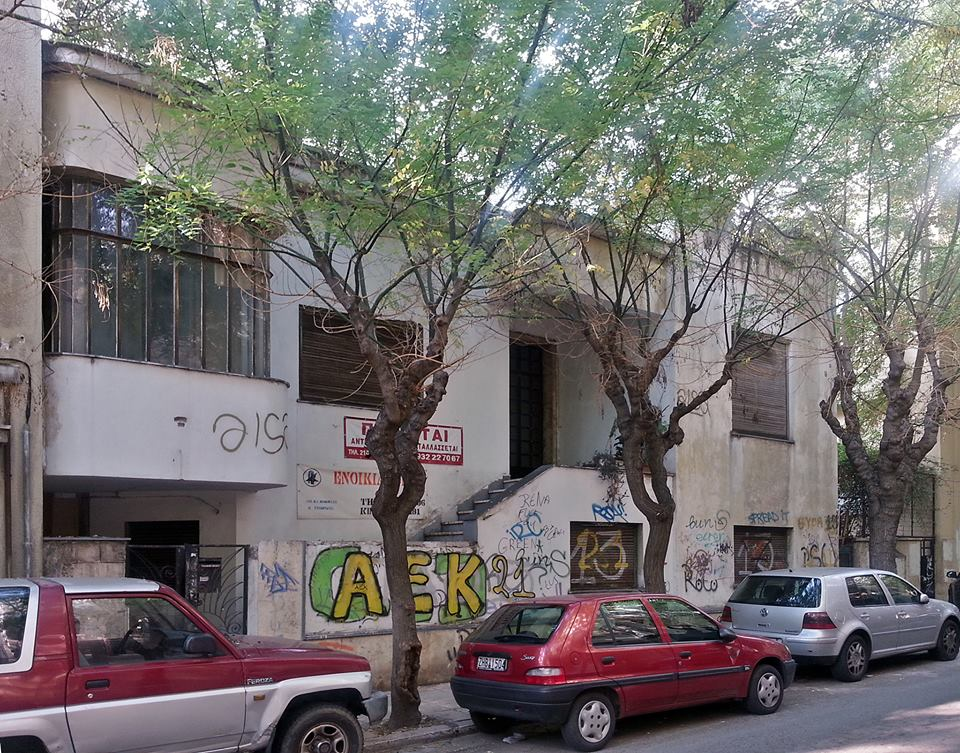
House on Spetson Street built for Panagiotis J. Carras (1939).

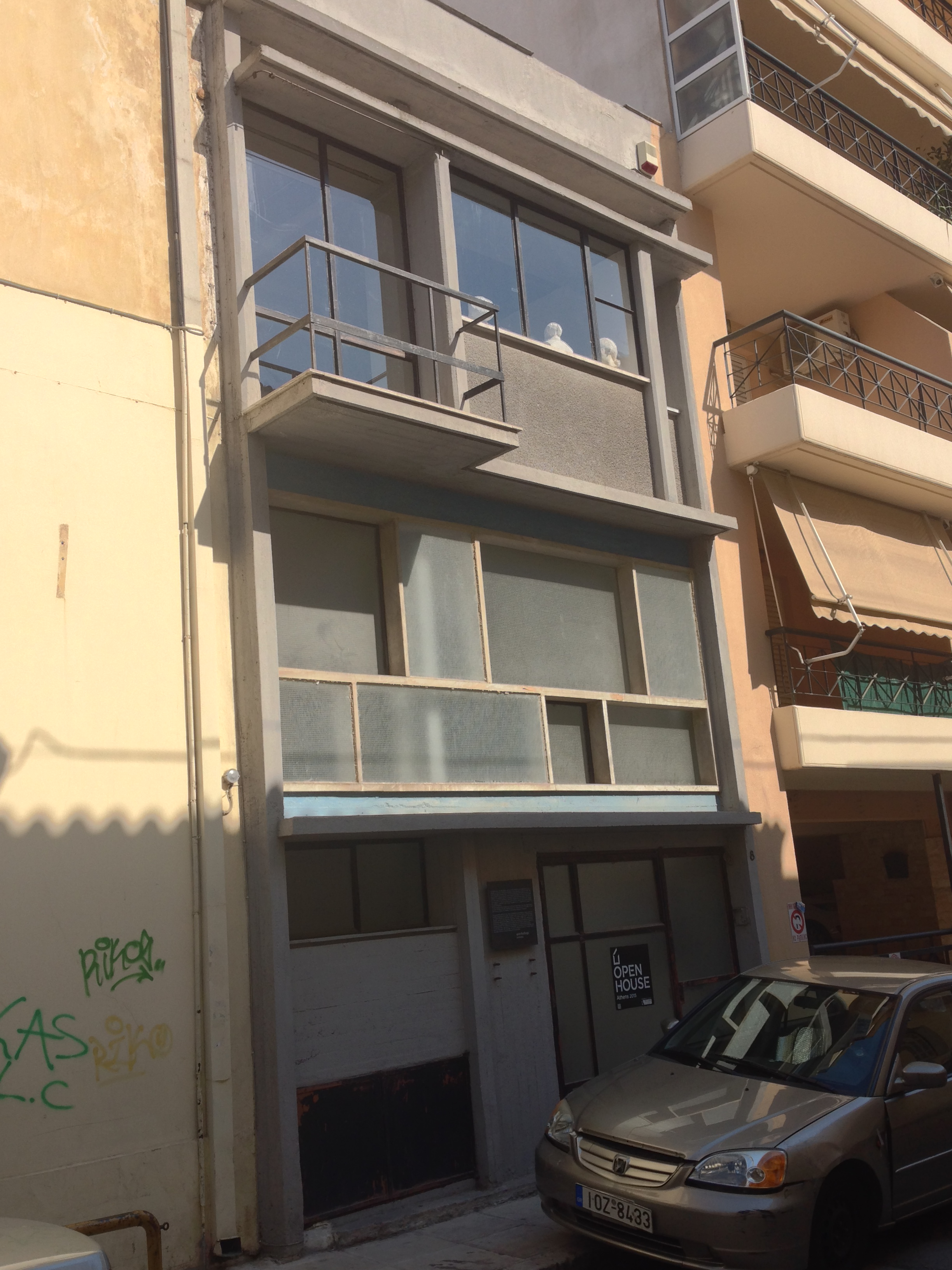
Tonis and Ioanna Spiteris's home and atelier on Kykladon Street. It was designed in 1955 by Aristomenis Provelengios.

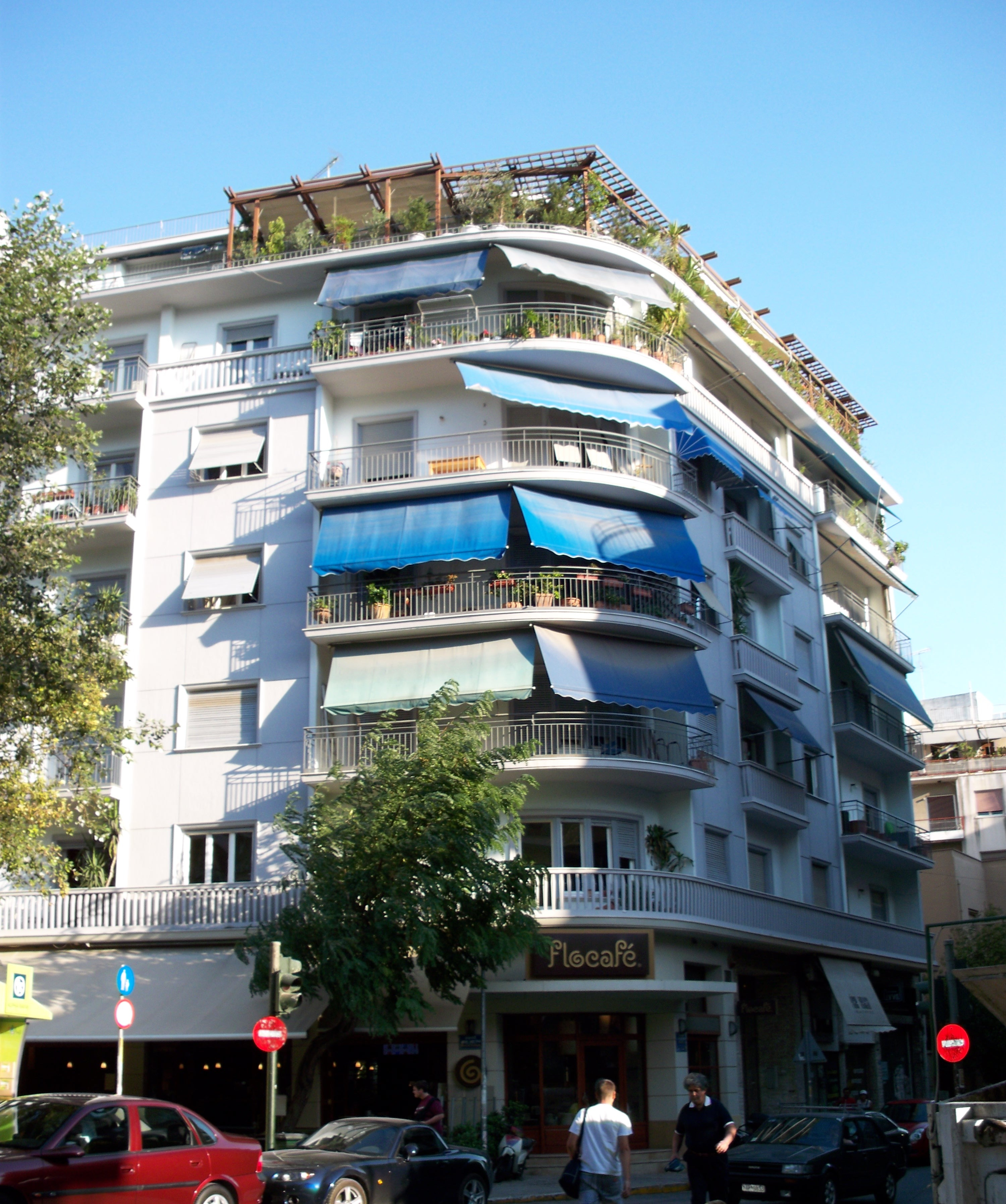
One of the many apartment buildings that can be found in Kypseli, built in the 1950s and early 1960s. These buildings tend to be made up of large apartment units and very rarely surpass six storeys in height.

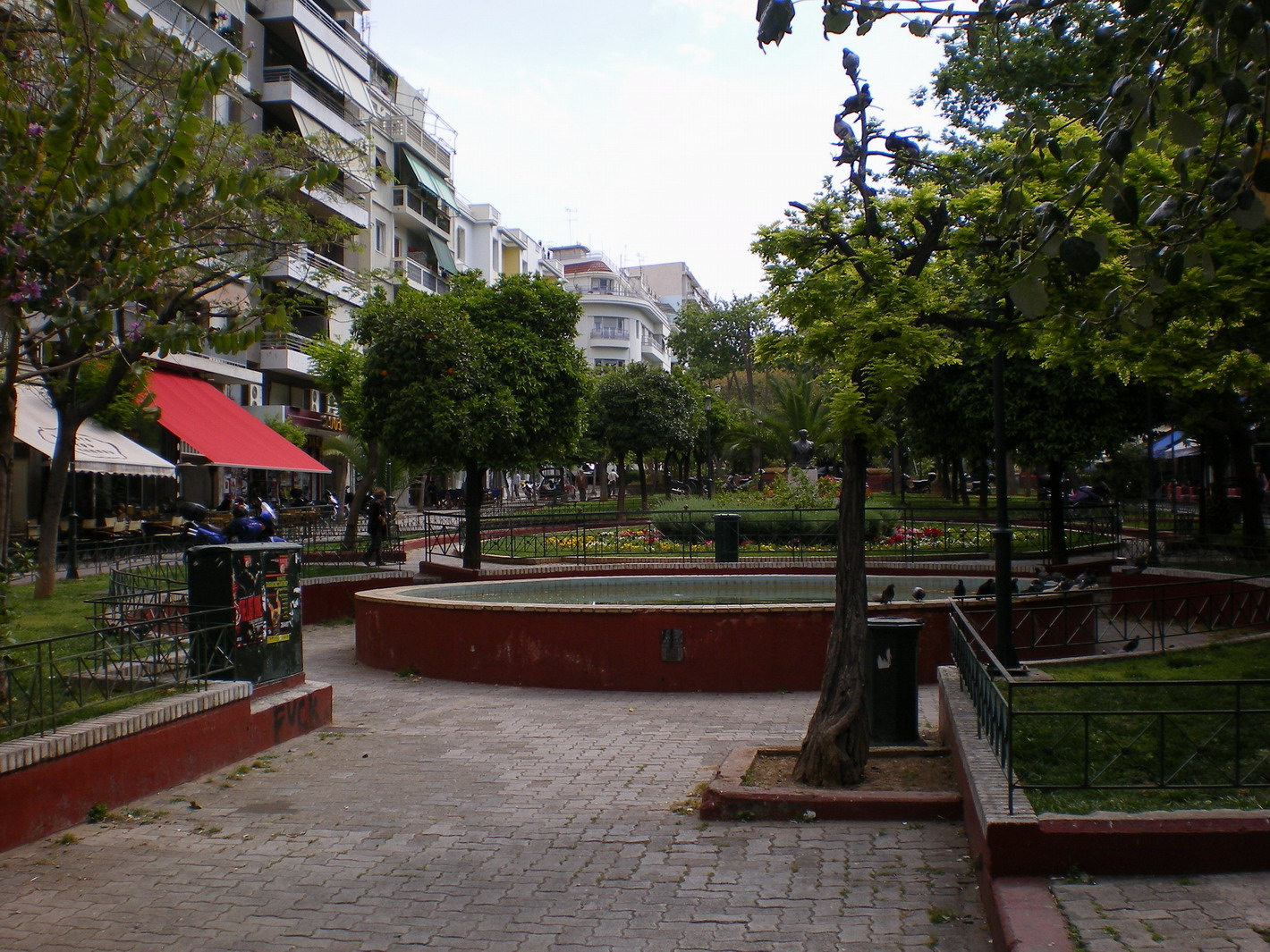
The historic Fokionos Negri Street, now pedestrianised with numerous cafés and a park along its length, runs through the middle of the district.

== See also ==
- Modern architecture in Athens
