= Galatsi =

Northern suburb of Athens, Greece

Galatsi Γαλάτσι
- Municipality
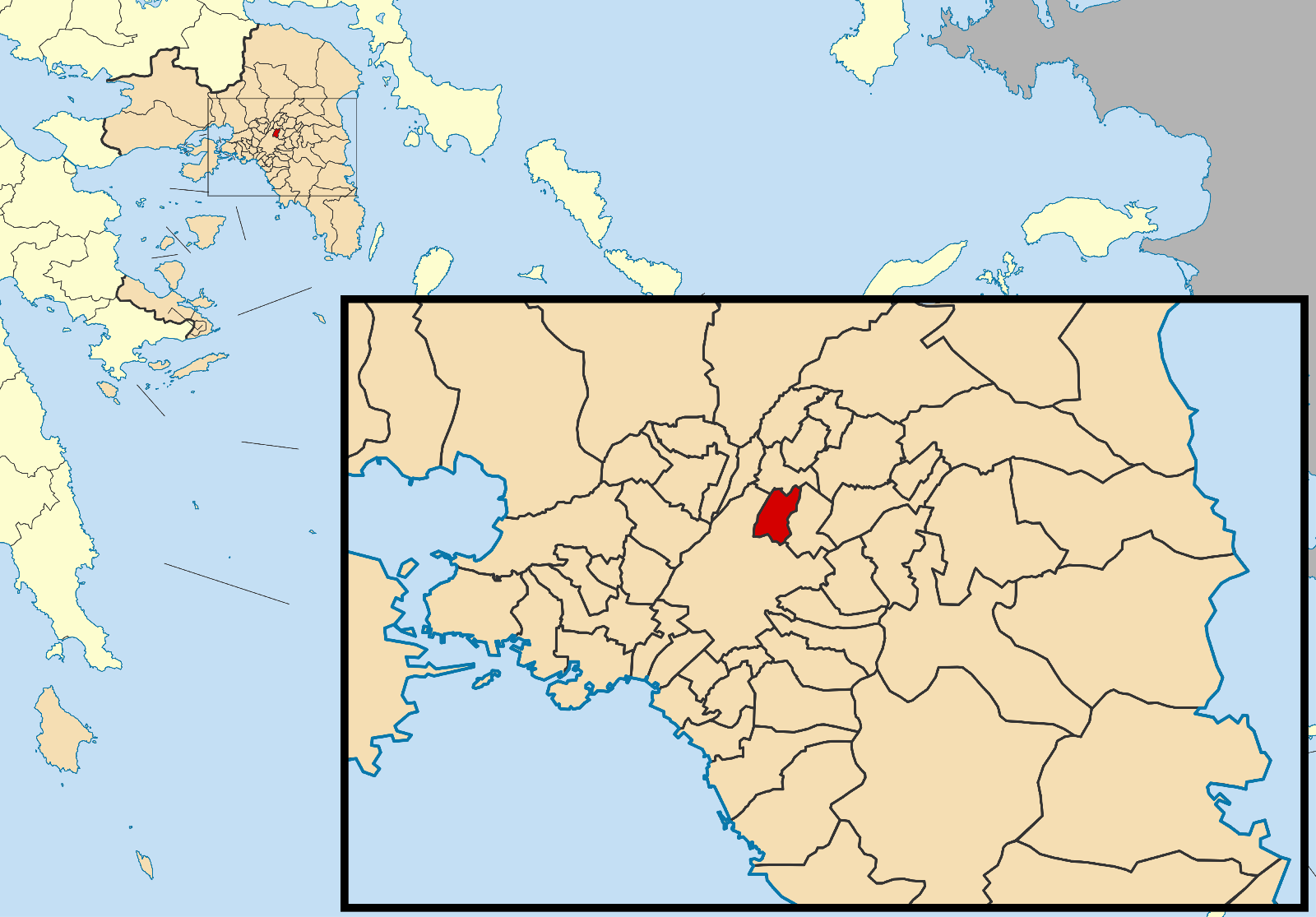

- Location within Greece
- Coordinates: 38°01′N 23°45′E
- Country: Greece
- Administrative region: Attica
- Regional unit: Central Athens
- Districts: 1

Area
  - Municipality: 4.026 km^{2} (1.554 sq mi)
- Elevation: 160 m (520 ft)

Population (2021)
  - Municipality: 57,909
  - Density: 14,380/km^{2} (37,250/sq mi)
- Time zone: UTC+2 (EET)
  - Summer (DST): UTC+3 (EEST)
- Postal code: 111 xx
- Area code: 210
- Vehicle registration: Z
- Website: www.galatsi.gr

Galatsi (Greek: Γαλάτσι, Galátsi [ɣaˈlatsi]), called in Katharevousa Galatsion (Greek: Γαλάτσιον, Galátsion), is a town, a northern suburb of Athens agglomeration, Greece, and a municipality of the Attica region. The municipality has an area of 4.026 km^{2}. Until the mid-20th century, the area was mainly made up of farmlands but due to the continuous expansion of the Greek capital, Galatsi was rapidly urbanised and has come to lie in the center of the Athens agglomeration.

== Etymology ==
Although several etymologies have been proposed about the origin of the name Galatsi, which already appears in the book of 1870, History of Athens, it originates from the surname of Symeon Galakis, a squire who purchased lands around the church of Agia Glykeria in 1851. Consequently, the whole area was given his name, which, according to the phenomenon featuring the old Athenian phonology and known as tsitakism, was pronounced 'Galatsis', thus the name of the area was finally Galatsi. An alternative theory suggests that it derived from gala, the Greek word for the milk that the shepherds of the area's rangelands yelled hovering around in order to sell their products.

== Geography ==
Galatsi is an inner suburb of the Athens urban area and is located 4 km (2 mi) northeast of the city centre. Its built-up area is continuous with those of Central Athens and neighbouring suburb Nea Ionia. It is one of the most densely populated areas of Athens, with a high percentage of its lands covered by flora though, as the hill of Tourkovounia with its forests and the park Alsos Veikou are among the major "green lungs" within the centre of Athens. The famous Grava school complex is located there, as are many other educational foundations and public and private institutes.

== Demography ==
| Year | Population |
|---|---|
| 1981 | 50,096 |
| 1991 | 57,230 |
| 2001 | 58,042 |
| 2011 | 59,345 |
| 2021 | 57,909 |

== Sites of interest ==
- Alsos Veikou, a beautiful leafy park
- Galatsi Olympic Hall - where table tennis and gymnastics were played. It holds up to 6,200 seats Website:
- Omorfokklisia, a 12th-century church in an area known for its peace and calmness

== Transportation ==
- Trolleys: 5 & 14
- Busses: 608, 444, 036, 622. From 5 April 2019 the line Ano Galatsi - Lamprini (with a second phase the extension to the rest of Galatsi and Metro Stations)
- Metro: Line 4 by 3 stations: Alsos Veikou, Galatsi and Elikonos (est. 2029-2030)
