= Pich Sophea =

Pich Sophea (ពេជ្រ សោភា)
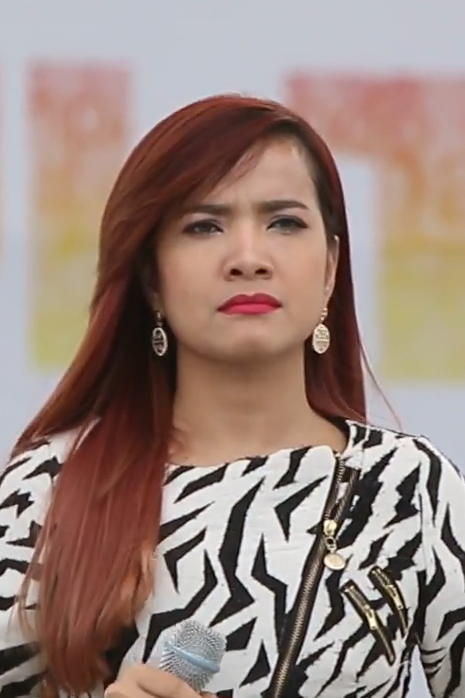
- Pich in 2015

Background information
- Born: 9 June 1985 (age 40); Phnom Penh, People's Republic of Kampuchea
- Origin: Cambodia
- Genres: Khmer traditional music, pop, R&B, rock & hip hop
- Occupations: Singer, songwriter, actress & brand ambassador
- Years active: 2004–present
- Label: Rasmey Hang Meas Production (2004–present)

Pich Sophea (Khmer: ពេជ្រ សោភា, born June 9, 1985) is a Cambodian singer and songwriter. First in the song (Better Day) with rapper "DJ-Sdey" released by Hang Meas Production (2004) This song made her gain recognition from She is also an actress, a goodwill ambassador for a well-known brand, and is known as a judge and a member of the audit committee, which evaluates the reality of the sound presented during the Blind audition, The Voice Cambodia.

== Early life ==
Pich Sophea was born on June 9, 1985, in Sangkat Boeung Salang, Khan Toul Kork, Phnom Penh. She has a father named Pich Savann and a mother named Sour Sopheap and four siblings. Her parents were business people. As a child, Sophea helped her family sell food to support her education. When she got older, Sophea started to sing for a restaurant in Phnom Penh up until she graduated high school. In 2003, she made a career move to sing for an entertainment center called "Spark Entertainment Center". Just one year later, Sophea was approached by a talent scout and was signed to a very high profile and established production company in Cambodia known as "Hang Meas Production" where her first solo album was released. The album was called, "Better Day," setting her debut into the Cambodian artistry world with the title track.

== Music career ==
From 2005 to 2010 Sophea's popularity gradually increased and she became popular in Cambodia, making her one of the top singers in Cambodia. Many of Sophea's most popular songs, released during 2005, U Better Not Come Home, Dream about you, became the Hits Album of the Year in Cambodia, becoming the most-listened-to song on Cambodian radio stations. She gained a lot of popularity and support during that time when the song (U Better Not Come Home) was included in Top1 Music Radio FM.97 (2005) by Apsara Radio FM 97. Invite her to perform in Australia as well.

From 2006 to 2008 Sophea released a series of songs and also appeared in the biggest concert in Cambodia, the Best of The Best concert 2006-2007-2008, this big concert was attended by Tens of thousands of spectators lined the grounds of the Phnom Penh Olympic Stadium. During 2009, Sophea was invited by her fans to perform in France, and she received more support than expected until now. In 2010, Sophea was invited by Channel 5 (Cambodia TV5) to perform at the Asean Top10 Music Concert.

== Pich Sophea Music Tour (2011–2013) ==
During 2011–2013 Pich Sophea was invited by her fans to perform a two-month tour of the United States through the Cambodian Arts Association there, which earned her a lot of support. Cambodians living in the United States as well. During 2012, Pich Sophea participated in an encouraging presentation on education in Sols 24/7 GDI Cambodia Free Education For All, an organization to support education and education in Cambodia as a charity, For the society as well. During 2013, Sophea was invited to perform on her second US tour in Stockton, California, which was her success in building a reputation for growing popularity among Cambodians. Americans who love and support her as well as help raise Cambodian artists.

== The Voice Coach (2014–2016, 2023) ==
Sophea is known as the Judge Coach and a member of the Audit Committee, which evaluates the reality of the soundtrack shown during the Blind audition of The Voice Cambodia on Hang Meas-HDTV Season 1. And the second season since its inception in 2014, when her first team, Soy Rattanak, qualified for The Final (Runner-up) Episode 16 of Week 6 and the second season in 2016 The second group, Miss (San Srey Lai / Death), made it to The Final (Runner-up) Episode 16 of Week 6. After The Voice Cambodia, Sophea also left Cambodia for France for a medical check-up.

Sophea returned for the show's third season in 2023, winning the show with her artist Lim Serey HanNika.

== Pich Sophea Pop Music (2015–2016) ==
During 2015–2016, Sophea released many popular songs known as (Pop Music) teaming up with rapper G-Devith, who is a Sound Mixed Editing musician. Also, the two dropped the song "Coffee 1500" is an original song that was popular during that time, which attracted a large number of fans from young people, this song Coffee 1500 was Sophea to compete in MAMF Migrant's Arirang Multicultural Festival 2015 in South Korea, and this song also ranked third, representing the culture, art, music from Cambodia.

In 2016 Sophea and David released a joint album during the Khmer New Year, "រាំញីកែងជើង" / "Heel Dance", which is the most popular hit album in Cambodia, which is the most popular on social media and External society, and was announced by the Prime Minister of Cambodia, Mr. Hun Sen, the most popular song of the year (Music of the years) and give bonuses to singers. Both of them received 162 million riels, equivalent to about 40,000 US dollars.

== Pich Sophea Brand Ambassador ==
During 2016 Guangdong-based mobile telecommunications company Oppo officially selected singer Pich Sophea to be the brand ambassador of Oppo Cambodia. Mr. Soeur Rithya, Marketing Manager of OPPO Cambodia, said that OPPO has more than 2 present. Years ago in Cambodia and today the company chose the top singer Pich Sophea to represent its products because he Assume that the promotion of Dara's products that are gaining popularity in Cambodia will increase the number of supporters, On Oppo Cambodia as well.

== Hits Songs (2017–2019) ==
In 2017–2018, even though she did not have a singing partner with G-Devith, Sophea's popularity still supported her, and she released a series of popular songs that received more than over 20 million views on YouTube, including the song: What's Your Names, Huy Huy, Frog wearing a hat, which has more than 20 million views on YouTube. Make her songs popular at that time.

=== Cambodia Top 50 Billboard (2019) ===
In 2019 Sophea released a song with Mr. Khemarak Sereymun, released by Reaksmey Hang Meas Production, entitled "My wife is not good" which put the song rights to the music player (Pleng) Developed by Smart Mobile, which selects only the most popular songs from the listeners to be among the top 50 song choices that can stand at the top of the Weekly of Cambodia Top 50. Billboard's Sophea Song Top 4 in the Top 50 Songs in Cambodia.

== Achievement ==
Year	Enter	Awards	Result	Media Publication
2005	U Better Not Come Home	Top1 Music Apsara FM	Nominated	Apsara Radio FM.97 Cambodia
2009	NO BODY	700k Dislike On YouTube	1st	YouTube Music SEA
2015	Cafe 1500	Top 3	Nominated	(MAMF) South Korea
2016	រាំញីកែងជើង (Heel Dance)	Music of the year	Nominated	Hun Sen Prime Minister of Cambodia
2019	My wife is not good	Top 4 Cambodia Top 50 Billboard	Nominated	Pleng By Smart Music

== Discography ==
Album	Genres	Artist	Released	Label
Better Day	Hip hop	Pich Sophea ft. DJ-Sdey	2004	Rasmey Hang Meas CD Vol.219
Dream about you	Classic	Pich Sophea	2005	Rasmey Hang Meas CD Vol.248
U Better Not Come Home	Hip hop	Pich Sophea ft. DJ-Sdey, Preap Sovath	2005	Rasmey Hang Meas CD Vol.255
Dhoom Dhoom	Hip hop	Pich Sophea ft. B.I.G	2006	Rasmey Hang Meas CD Vol.294
NO BODY	POP	Aok Sokunkanha Pich Sophea Sokun Nisa Chhet Sovanpanha	2009	Rasmey Hang Meas CD Vol.276

== TV shows ==
- Coach for The Voice Cambodia (season 1) 2014 with Nop Bayyareth, Aok Sokunkanha, and Chhorn Sovannareach.
- Coach for The Voice Cambodia (season 2) 2016 with Nop Bayyareth, Aok Sokunkanha, and Chhorn Sovannareach.
