= Cambodian Idol season 1 =

Cambodian Idol
- Season 1
- Hosted by: Chea Vibol; Chan Keonimol
- Judges: Preap Sovath; Aok Sokunkanha; Nop Bayyareth; Chhorn Sovannareach
- Winner: Ny Rathana
- Runners-up: Mao Hachi & Sao Oudom

Release
- Original network: Hang Meas HDTV
- Original release: July 12 – November 1, 2015

The first season of Cambodian reality singing competition program Cambodian Idol premiered on 12 July 2015 on Hang Meas HDTV. Based on the reality singing competition Pop Idol, the series was created by British television producer Simon Fuller. It is part of an international series.

== The Judges Auditions ==
| Key | Contestants who were eliminated in this round |

=== Episode 1: July 12, 2015 ===
| Order | Contestants | Order | Contestant | Order | Contestant |
|---|---|---|---|---|---|
| 1 | Eam Vanny | 2 | Sun Chanthorn | 3 | Pom Sophal |
| 4 | Chea Sophea | 5 | San Sreynich | 6 | Lonn Sobinn |
| 7 | Say Chankanika | 8 | Putt Ra | 9 | Ret Pov |
| 10 | Bolam Kakrai | 11 | Yong Nita | 12 | Ron Kimsorn |
| 13 | Pov Sophearany | 14 | Kang Dararith | 15 | Sean Seyla |
| 16 | Som Meta | 17 | Cheng Sangha | | |

=== Episode 2: July 19, 2015 ===
| Order | Contestants | Order | Contestant | Order | Contestant |
|---|---|---|---|---|---|
| 1 | Eng Tongleng | 2 | Sun Chanthida | 3 | Sun Sreynun |
| 4 | Chour Sreyroth | 5 | Yem Vandy | 6 | Seoum Samnith |
| 7 | Leng Sopheak | 8 | Kanha Yuti | 9 | Doung Chansey |
| 10 | Meoun Soknan | 11 | Sem Dina | 12 | Sem Kimleang |
| 13 | Chhem Chivorn | 14 | Noun Lineang | 15 | Huy Sreyhouch |
| 16 | Mao Hachi | 17 | Eal Chandara | 18 | Houn Theoun |
| 19 | Yorn Samnang | 20 | Preung Phorn | | |

=== Episode 3: July 26, 2015 ===
| Order | Contestants | Order | Contestant | Order | Contestant |
|---|---|---|---|---|---|
| 1 | Mot Savai | 2 | Saki Hanernafi | 3 | Koh Sokha |
| 4 | Sound Sovannchanny | 5 | Sok Pheakdey | 6 | Oum Parinha |
| 7 | Phorn Chomnan | 8 | Chhaem Chomreoun | 9 | Seng Chatvichea |
| 10 | Penh Sreypich | 11 | Vattanak Khun | 12 | Sok Pheakdey |
| 13 | Mao Chandina | 14 | Ny Rathana | 15 | Sous Som Arn |
| 16 | Hy Chanya | 17 | Thorn Sokban | 18 | Eng Sreyoun |
| 19 | Sam Narak | 20 | Kouy Ratin | | |

=== Episode 4: August 2, 2015 ===
| Order | Contestants | Order | Contestant | Order | Contestant |
|---|---|---|---|---|---|
| 1 | Nom Chanrathanak | 2 | Kola Rachana | 3 | Chea Nim |
| 4 | Kosal Houtsreypov | 5 | Vong Daro | 6 | Mao Povmeas |
| 7 | Mao Chhunchan | 8 | Thol Sreyleak | 9 | Sovathdy Thearika |
| 10 | Ouch Thaiheng | 11 | Hang Sonisa | 12 | Meas Monyreach |
| 13 | Hang Rathanak | 14 | Ngoun Sreypheap | 15 | Yong Khaneth |
| 16 | Mann Chantha | 17 | Khun Chandaravatey | 18 | Por Sina |
| 19 | Ke Sothida | 20 | Pankhem Theavy | 21 | Ngout Bora |

=== Episode 5: August 9, 2015 ===
| Order | Contestants | Order | Contestant | Order | Contestant |
|---|---|---|---|---|---|
| 1 | Ly Seang | 2 | Noy Sarn | 3 | Eoun Bunna |
| 4 | Din Dyna | 5 | Krouch Poli | 6 | Sothy Panha |
| 7 | Ly Chansreypov | 8 | Houn Rathana | 9 | Chhun Balo |
| 10 | Long Damy | 11 | San Pisey | 12 | Chhim Sophorn |
| 13 | Sao Oudom | 14 | Bun Chantha | 15 | Touch Seakmeng |
| 16 | Nut Vannak | 17 | Phatt Sokhomviseth | | |

== Theater Round ==
| Key | Contestants who were eliminated in this round |

=== Episode 6: August 16, 2015 ===
| Group Order | Member #1 | Member #2 | Member #3 | Member #4 | Member #5 |
|---|---|---|---|---|---|
| 1 | Ngoun Bora | Yorn Samnang | Sao Oudom | Sean Seyla | |
| 2 | Meas Monyreach | Cheng Sangha | Kanha Yuti | Chea Sophea | |
| 3 | Hang Rathanak | Sous Sam Arn | Sam Narak | Meoun Soknan | Sok Pheakdey |
| 4 | Chhun Balo | Ny Rathana | Sothy Panha | Nut Vannak | |
| 5 | Yong Nita | Long Damy | Ngoun Sreyphea | Krouch Poli | |
| 6 | Lonn Sobinn | Eng Sreyoun | Sem Kimleang | Mann Chantha | |
| 7 | Sun Sreynun | Mot Savai | Sovathdy Thearika | Ly Seang | |
| 8 | Ouch Thaiheng | Say Chankanika | Khun Chandaravatey | Kosal Houtsreypov | Sun Chanthorn |
| 9 | Eng Tongleng | Phatt Sokhomviseth | Noun Lyneang | Kola Rachana | |
| 10 | Kouy Ratin | Chhem Chomreoun | Eoun Bunna | Ret Pov | |
| 11 | Chea Nim | Putt Ra | Sun Pisey | Chhem Chivorn | |
| 12 | Soeum Samnith | Ron Kimsorn | Den Dina | Penh Sreypich | |
| 13 | Sound Sovannchanny | Touch Seakmeng | San Sreynich | Sun Chanthida | |
| 14 | Eam Vanny | Mao Hachi | Preung Phorn | Mao Chandina | |
| 15 | Kang Darith | Vattanak Phumi | Bolam Kakrai | Yem Vandy | |
| 16 | Pankhem Theavy | Por Sina | Hy Chanya | Bun Chantha | |

=== Episode 7: August 23, 2015 ===
| Order | Contestant #1 | Contestant #2 |
|---|---|---|
| 1 | Mao Chandina | Eng Tongleng |
| 2 | Sun Chanthorn | Kanha Yuti |
| 3 | Ngoun Sreypheap | Noun Lyneang |
| 4 | Chea Sophea | Yem Vandy |
| 5 | Bolam Kakrai | Sean Seyla |
| 6 | Sok Pheakdey | Ron Kimsorn |
| 7 | Eam Vanny | Soeum Samnith |
| 8 | Buth Chantha | Sovathdy Thearika |
| 9 | Ny Rathana | Chhun Balo |
| 10 | Sam Narak | Por Sina |
| 11 | Meas Monyreach | Lonn Sobinn |
| 12 | Yong Nita | Preung Phorn |
| 13 | Chea Nim | Kouy Ratin |
| 14 | Mao Hachi | Chhem Chivorn |
| 15 | Khun Chandaravatey | Say Chankanika |
| 16 | Sao Oudom | Yorn Samnang |

== Green Miles ==
| Key | Contestants who were eliminated in this round | Contestants who advanced to the Live Show |

=== Episode 8: August 30, 2015 ===
| Order | Contestant | Order | Contestant |
|---|---|---|---|
| 1 | Sun Chanthorn | 2 | Chhem Chivorn |
| 3 | Soeum Samnith | 4 | Sean Seyla |
| 5 | Ny Rathana | 6 | Mao Hachi |
| 7 | Yorn Samnang | 8 | Yong Nita |
| 9 | Sok Pheakdey | 10 | Ron Kimsorn |
| 11 | Eam Vanny | 12 | Chea Nim |
| 13 | Chhun Balo | 14 | Sovathdy Thearika |
| 15 | Kanha Yuti | 16 | Chea Sophea |
| 17 | Kouy Ratin | 18 | Eng Tongleng |
| 19 | Lonn Sobinn | 20 | Sao Oudom |
| 21 | Bolam Kakrai | 22 | Meas Monyreach |

== Live Show ==
| Key | Contestants who were eliminated in this round |

=== Episode 9: September 6, 2015 ===
| Order | Contestant | Order | Contestant |
|---|---|---|---|
| 1 | Soeum Samnith | 2 | Lonn Sobinn |
| 3 | Sao Oudom | 4 | Ny Rathana |
| 5 | Kouy Ratin | 6 | Sun Chanthorn |
| 7 | Eng Tongleng | 8 | Meas Monyreach |
| 9 | Yong Nita | 10 | Eam Vanny |
| 11 | Mao Hachi | 12 | Sovathdy Thearika |

=== Episode 10: September 13, 2015 ===
| Order | Contestant | Order | Contestant |
|---|---|---|---|
| 1 | Eng Tongleng | 2 | Sao Oudom |
| 3 | Meas Monyreach | 4 | Eam Vanny |
| 5 | Sun Chanthorn | 6 | Soeum Samnith |
| 7 | Sovathdy Thearika | 8 | Kouy Ratin |
| 9 | Ny Rathana | 10 | Mao Hachi |
| 11 | Yong Nita | | |

=== Episode 11: September 20, 2015 ===
| Order | Contestant | Order | Contestant |
|---|---|---|---|
| 1 | Yong Nita | 2 | Sun Chanthorn |
| 3 | Kouy Ratin | 4 | Meas Monyreach |
| 5 | Soeum Samnith | 6 | Sao Oudom |
| 7 | Ny Rathana | 8 | Eam Vanny |
| 9 | Sovathdy Thearika | 10 | Mao Hachi |

=== Episode 12: September 27, 2015 ===
| Order | Contestant | Order | Contestant |
|---|---|---|---|
| 1 | Sao Oudom | 2 | Mao Hachi |
| 3 | Ny Rathana | 4 | Sovathdy Thearika |
| 5 | Meas Monyreach | 6 | Soeum Samnith |
| 7 | Sun Chanthorn | 8 | Eam Vanny |

=== Episode 13: October 4, 2015 ===
| Order | Contestant | Order | Contestant |
|---|---|---|---|
| 1 | Eam Vanny | 2 | Sun Chanthorn |
| 3 | Meas Mony Reach | 4 | Ny Rathana |
| 5 | Mao Hachi | 6 | Sovathdy Thearika |
| 7 | Sao Oudom | | |

=== Episode 14: October 11, 2015 ===
==== First round ====
| Order | Contestant | Order | Contestant |
|---|---|---|---|
| 1 | Eam Vanny | 2 | Sao Oudom |
| 3 | Meas Mony Reach | 4 | Ny Rathana |
| 5 | Mao Hachi | 6 | Sovathdy Thearika |

==== Second Round: In Pair ====
| Pair Order | Contestant 1 | Contestant 2 |
|---|---|---|
| 1 | Sovathdy Thearika | Ny Rathana |
| 2 | Mao Hachi | Sao Oudom |
| 3 | Eam Vanny | Meas Mony Reach |

=== Episode 15: October 18, 2015 ===
| Order | Contestant |
|---|---|
| 1 | Sovathdy Thearika |
| 2 | Mao Hachi |
| 3 | Eam Vanny |
| 4 | Sao Oudom |
| 5 | Ny Rathana |

This episode generated a small political controversy around the releasing of vote counts.

=== Episode 16: October 25, 2015 ===
| Order | Contestant |
|---|---|
| 1 | Mao Hachi |
| 2 | Sovathdy Thearika |
| 3 | Sao Oudom |
| 4 | Ny Rathana |

=== Episode 17: November 1, 2015 ===
| Order | Contestant |
|---|---|
| 1 | Ny Rathana |
| 2 | Mao Hachi |
| 3 | Sao Oudom |

== Season 1 Finalist Chart ==
| Key | Winner | Top 3 | Eliminated Contestants | Week that the contestant was eliminated |

| Contestant | Live Show 1 | Live Show 2 | Live Show 3 | Live Show 4 | Live Show 5 | Live Show 6 | Live Show 7 | Semi-Final | Final |
|---|---|---|---|---|---|---|---|---|---|
| Ny Rathana | | | | | | | | | |
| Mao Hachi | | | | | | | | | |
| Sao Oudom | | | | | | | | | |
| Sovathdy Thearika | | | | | | | | | |
| Eam Vanny | | | | | | | | | |
| Meas Monyreach | | | | | | | | | |
| Sun Chanthorn | | | | | | | | | |
| Soeum Samnith | | | | | | | | | |
| Kouy Ratin | | | | | | | | | |
| Yong Nita | | | | | | | | | |
| Eng Tongleng | | | | | | | | | |
| Lonn Sobinn | | | | | | | | | |
