= Tep Boprek =

Tep Boprek ទេពបូព្រឹក្ស
- Born: Sim Tepboprek; 22 December 1993 (age 32); Phnom Penh, Cambodia
- Other names: Tep Boprek; TBP
- Occupations: Singer; rapper
- Years active: 2012–present
- Spouse: G-Devith
- Children: 1
- Musical career
- Origin: Phnom Penh, Cambodia
- Genres: Pop; hip hop; R&B
- Label: Dit-Way Nation (currently)

Sim Tepboprek (Khmer: សុឹម ទេពបូព្រឹក្ស; born December 22, 1993), better known by her stage name TBP (Khmer: ធីប៊ីភី), is a Cambodian singer and rapper. Boprek began her career in 2012.

== Discography ==
=== Solo albums ===
- 2012: No More Lonely
- 2013: ព្រមបែកព្រោះស្រលាញ់
- 2013: Right Here Waiting For You
- 2014: សង្សារថ្មីល្អនឹងបងទេ?
- 2015: មិនជឿថាបងមិនស្រលាញ់អូន
- 2016: Twerk
- 2016: Bad Wonder Woman
- 2017: My សង្សារ
- 2017: ឲ្យអូនភ្លេចបងដូចឲ្យអូនភ្លេចដកដង្ហើម
- 2021: Top Of The Lady

== Performances ==
- 2014: Teen Zone Concert (Khmer:តំបន់យុវវ័យ)
- 2015: Water Music Concert (Khmer:តន្ត្រីលើទឹក)
- 2016: Special Concert (Khmer:តន្ត្រីពិសេស)
- 2017: Expert Concert on Hang Meas HDTV
- 2017: ICHITAN Concert on Hang Meas HDTV
- 2014–present: Hang Meas Tour Concerts (Tour Concerts are available on special events)

== Filmography ==
=== Television ===
- 2016: I Am a Singer Cambodia on Hang Meas HDTV
- 2016: Killer Karaoke Cambodia (season 2) on Hang Meas HDTV
