= The Voice Cambodia =

Cambodian reality singing competition

- Genre: Reality television
- Created by: John de Mol Jr.
- Presented by: Sok Rasy; Chan Keonimol
- Judges: Aok Sokunkanha; Chhorn Sovannareach; Pich Sophea; Nop Bayyareth
- Country of origin: Cambodia
- Original language: Khmer
- No. of seasons: 3
- No. of episodes: 32

Production
- Production companies: Hang Meas; Talpa (2014-2016); ITV Studios (2023-present)

Original release
- Network: Hang Meas HDTV
- Release: 3 August 2014 – 19 June 2016
- Release: June 4 – October 1, 2023

Related
- The Voice (franchise)

The Voice Cambodia is a Cambodian reality singing competition. The first season premiered on Hang Meas HDTV on August 3, 2014. One of the important premises of the show is the quality of the singing talent. Four coaches, themselves popular performing artists, train the talents in their group. Talents are selected in blind auditions, where the coaches cannot see, but only hear the auditioner. The winner will receive 100 million Cambodian riel ($25,000), and become a singer for Hang Meas Production.

It is the fifth national franchise in the Southeast Asian region after Vietnam, Thailand, Indonesia, and Philippines.

== Format ==
The series consists of three phases:

- Blind Auditions
- Battle Round
- Live Shows

=== Blind Auditions ===
Four judges/coaches, all famous musicians, will choose teams of contestants through a blind audition process. Judges have the length of the auditionee's performance to decide whether to select that singer for their team. If two or more judges want the same singer then the singer gets to choose which coach they want to work with.

=== Battle Round ===
Each team of singers will be mentored and developed by their coach. In the second stage, coaches will have two of their team members battle against each other by singing the same song, with the coach choosing which team member will advance to the next stage, but the one who is not chosen by the coach still has another chance from another coaches' steal to advance them to the next stage too.

=== Live Shows ===
In the final phase, the remaining contestants will compete against each other in live broadcasts. The television audience will help to decide who moves on. When one team member remains for each coach, the contestants will compete against each other in the finale.

== Hosts and coaches ==
The show is hosted by Chea Vibol and Chan Keonimol, while the judges are Aok Sokunkanha, Chhorn Sovannareach, Pich Sophea and Nop Bayyareth, four prominent singers in Cambodia.

== Season summary ==
Colour key

Team Reach
Team Sophea
Team Kanha
Team Bayareth

Season	Premiere	Finale	Winner	Other finalists			Winning coach	Presenters	Coaches (chair's order)			
Season	Premiere	Finale	Winner	Other finalists			Winning coach	Presenters	1	2	3	4
1	August 3, 2014	November 16, 2014	Buth Seiha	Soy Ratanak	Khun Vutha	Chamroeun Sopheak	Chhorn Sovannareach	Chea Vibol; Chan Keonimol	Bayareth	Kanha	Sophea	Reach
2	March 6, 2016	June 19, 2016	Thel Thai	Chinn Rattanak	Khy Sokhun	San Sreylai	Aok Sokunkanha	Chea Vibol; Chan Keonimol	Bayareth	Kanha	Sophea	Reach
3	June 4, 2023	October 1, 2023	Lim Serey HanNika	Kim Sovann	Soun Sovanchany	Sal Bati	Pich Sophea	Keonimol; Rasy Sok	Reach	Kanha	Sophea	Bayareth

=== Coaches' teams ===
Color key

- – Winner
- – Finalist

Season	Coaches and their finalists			
1	Chhorn Sovannareach	Pich Sophea	Aok Sokunkanha	Nop Bayareth
1	Buth Seiha; Van Phally; Ban Monileak; Lach Sear; Pach Kimmouy; Sun Lyheang	Soy Ratanak; Eum Run; So Vannita; Keo Bunthea; Vichet Damara; Sok Channea	Khun Vutha; Ly Sokneth; Vong Dara Ratana; Sou Siryka; Chenda Vita; Keo Sopanha	Chamreun Sopheak; Chheav Loeun; Samut Sreyka; Chhay Sovy; Sok Marin; Chhin Samnang
2	Khy Sokhun; Nget Soraingsey; So Sophalin; Tit Sophat; Chom Somphors; Tak Narita; Chhoeun Chet; Khun Veasnan	San Sreylai; En Sereyvong; Mak Teprindaro; Long Rattana; Chheng Danich; Khem Lyhong; Houn Som Oul; Run Rotha	Thel Thai; Reth Suzana; Chhay Nakhim; Ton Chanseyma; Chhun Bunheng; Sam Loka; Chhean Narin; Nav Ruthy	Chinn Rattanak; Sorm Saosovanna; Leng Thida; Oung Sovannarith; Pom Phearom; Sothy Panha; Bi Kimsim; Sorm Pisey
3	Sal Bati; Hun Malis; Nhean Tey	Lim Serey HanNika; Sun Veha; Hu Yingfeng	Kim Sovann; Sok Saravita; Khun Vithet	Soun Sovanchany; Neang Sambath; Mothe
