= The Voice Cambodia season 2 =

The Voice Cambodia
- Season 2
- Hosted by: Chea Vibol; Chan Keonimol
- Judges: Aok Sokunkanha; Chhorn Sovannareach; Pich Sophea; Nop Bayyareth
- Winner: Thel Thai
- Runners-up: Khy Sokhun; San Sreylai; Chhin Rattanak

Release
- Original network: Rasmey Hang Meas HDTV
- Original release: 6 March – 19 June 2016

Season chronology
- ← Previous; Season 1

The Voice Cambodia (season 2) is a Cambodian reality talent show that was aired from 6 March to 19 June 2016 on Rasmey Hang Meas HDTV.

== Teams ==
Color key

- Winner
- Finalist
- Eliminated in the Semi-final
- Eliminated in Week 4 of live shows
- Eliminated in Week 3 of live shows
- Eliminated in Week 1/2 of live shows
- Artist stolen by another coach
- Eliminated in the Battle rounds

| Coaches | Top 48 artists | | | |
|---|---|---|---|---|
| Chhorn Sovannareach | | | | |
| Chhorn Sovannareach | Khy Sokhun | Nget Soraingsey | So Sophalin | Tit Sophat |
| Chhorn Sovannareach | Chom Somphors | Tak Narita | Khun Veasna | Chhoeun Chet |
| Chhorn Sovannareach | ~~Sothy Panha~~ | ~~Nav Puthy~~ | Yen Mouyheng | Choun Nakry |
| Chhorn Sovannareach | Ket Veasna | Koek Sovanneang | | |
| Pich Sophea | | | | |
| Pich Sophea | San Sreylai | En Sereyvong | Mak Teprindaro | Long Rattana |
| Pich Sophea | Khem Lyhong | Chheng Danich | Houn Som Oul | Run Rotha |
| Pich Sophea | Preung Chanmony | Phay Kakkada | Im Hoklin | Chan Sovannara |
| Pich Sophea | Chea Sarun | Tang Lin Alene | | |
| Aok Sokunkanha | | | | |
| Aok Sokunkanha | Thel Thai | Reth Suzana | Chhay Nakhim | Ton Chanseyma |
| Aok Sokunkanha | Chhun Bunheng | Sam Loka | Chhean Narin | Nav Puthy |
| Aok Sokunkanha | ~~Pom Phearom~~ | ~~Long Rattana~~ | ~~Khy Sokhun~~ | Oeng Mouykea |
| Aok Sokunkanha | Soun Sreynak | Pov Veasna | | |
| Nop Bayyareth | | | | |
| Nop Bayyareth | Chhin Rattanak | Sorm Saosovanna | Leng Thida | Oung Sovannarith |
| Nop Bayyareth | Pom Phearom | Sothy Panha | Sorm Pisey | Bi Kimsim |
| Nop Bayyareth | ~~Sam Loka~~ | ~~Chhoeun Chet~~ | Run Rotha | Sorm Pisey |
| Nop Bayyareth | Morm Sreynou | Thy Vandy | | |
Note: Italicized names are stolen artists (names struck through within former teams).

== The First Phase: The Blind Auditions ==
A new feature within the Blind Auditions this season is the Block, which each coach can use once to prevent one of the other coaches from getting a contestant.

Color key

| | Coach pressed "I WANT YOU" button |
| | Artist defaulted to a coach's team |
| | Artist elected a coach's team |
| | Artist eliminated with no coach pressing their button |
| ✘ | Coach pressed the "I WANT YOU" button, but was blocked by Reach from getting the artist |
| ✘ | Coach pressed the "I WANT YOU" button, but was blocked by Sophea from getting the artist |
| ✘ | Coach pressed the "I WANT YOU" button, but was blocked by Kanha from getting the artist |
| ✘ | Coach pressed the "I WANT YOU" button, but was blocked by Rith from getting the artist |

=== Episode 1: March 06, 2016 ===
| Order | Artist | Song | Coaches and artists choices | | | |
| Order | Artist | Song | Reach | Sophea | Kanha | Reth |
|---|---|---|---|---|---|---|
| 1 | Pom Phearom _{24, from Tboung Khmum} | "Propun Rot Choal" | — | | | — |
| 2 | Nget Sophanna _{33, from Phnom Penh} | "Sou Kleat" | — | — | — | — |
| 3 | Chhin Rattanak _{20, from Kampong Cham} | "Saxophone Bat Sneh" | | | ✘ | |
| 4 | Koek Sovanneang _{29, from Siem Reap} | "Oun Nov Sneh Bong Doch Thngai Mon Te" | | — | — | — |
| 5 | Khem Lyhong _{27, from Kampot} | "Kong Mean Thngai Oun Deng" | — | | — | — |
| 6 | Morm Sreynou _{18, from Phnom Penh} | "Besdong Ekka" | — | — | — | |
| 7 | Sorm Saosovanna _{19, from Phnom Penh} | "Lady" | | | | |
| 8 | Yeng Dena _{29, from Kampong Cham} | "Toeng Trung Ster Thleay Niyey Min Chenh" | — | — | — | — |
| 9 | Chheng Danich _{24, from Pursat} | "1000 Reatrey" | — | | — | — |
| 10 | Thon Sreyleak _{17, from Phnom Penh} | "Oy Oun Som Srolanh Pong" | — | — | — | — |
| 11 | Khun Veasna _{24, from Prey Veng} | "Songsa Oun Chea Pa Bong" | | | | |
| 12 | Chhean Narin _{27, from Battambang} | "Thgai Bak Roseal" | — | | | — |

=== Episode 2: March 13, 2016 ===
| Order | Artist | Song | Coaches and artists choices | | | |
| Order | Artist | Song | Reach | Sophea | Kanha | Reth |
|---|---|---|---|---|---|---|
| 1 | San Sreylai _{23, from Poipet} | "Som Tver Neak Ti 3" | — | | — | — |
| 2 | Reth Suzana _{16, from Phnom Penh} | "The Power Of Love" | | | | ✘ |
| 3 | Sorn Phearat _{28, from Phnom Penh} | "Keng Min Louk Call Mok Bong" | — | — | — | — |
| 4 | Preung Chanmony _{25, from Battambang} | "Deng Te Tha Khnom Chheu Chab" | — | | — | — |
| 5 | Rech Sela _{29, from Tboung Khmum} | "Ruk Oun Nis Hery" | — | — | — | — |
| 6 | Sam Loka _{28, from Pailin} | "Besdong Neak Brodal" | | | | |
| 7 | Chea Bano _{26, from Kompong Speu} | "Som Chet Kom La-eang" | — | — | — | — |
| 8 | Tak Narita _{22, from Takeo} | "Prous Bong Srolanh Ke Klang" | | | | ✘ |
| 9 | Chhay Nakhim _{24, from Phnom Penh} | "Keng Min Louk Call Mok Bong" | — | | | |
| 10 | Nel Lida _{23, from Phnom Penh} | "Ors Chet Ors Thmor" | — | — | — | — |
| 11 | Hach Vireak & Sokhak Vibol _{24 & 31, from Battambang} | "Trorm Rous Prous Cham Merl Oun" | — | — | — | — |
| 12 | Thy Vandy _{23, from Battambang} | "Chkout Prous Sneh Bong" | | — | | |
| 13 | Phay Kakkada _{27, from Kandal} | "Chheu Chheu" | — | | — | — |

=== Episode 3: March 20, 2016 ===
| Order | Artist | Song | Coaches and artists choices | | | |
| Order | Artist | Song | Reach | Sophea | Kanha | Reth |
|---|---|---|---|---|---|---|
| 1 | Chao Sokmey _{27, from Kandal} | "You Raise Me Up" | | — | — | |
| 2 | Nav Puthy _{25, from Koh Kong} | "Ors Sneh Tae Min Chong Bat Borng Oun" | | — | — | — |
| 3 | Thel Thai _{25, from Phnom Penh} | "Songsa Kro Junpo Oun" | | | | |
| 4 | Houn Som Oul _{25, from Kampot} | "Nerk Songsa Chas" | — | | — | — |
| 5 | Chea Sarun _{28, from Kompong Speu} | "Besdong 100" | | | | |
| 6 | Kin Pheareak _{24, from Preah Vihear} | "Sou Kleat" | — | — | — | — |
| 7 | Heu Sreynheat _{24, from Phnom Penh} | "Som Choub Mon Bek" | — | — | — | — |
| 8 | Sorm Pisey _{18, from Phnom Penh} | "Mercy" | | — | — | — |
| 9 | Ket Veasna _{25, from Prey Veng} | "Toeng Trung Ster Thleay Niyey Min Chenh" | | | | |
| 10 | Ton Chanseyma _{17, from Takeo} | "Kom Bach Denh Oun Oy Srolanh Ke" | — | — | | — |
| 11 | Rum Ran _{20, from Siem Reap} | "Puk Ery Mae Ery Neang Ka Choal Khnom Hery" | — | — | — | — |
| 12 | Yen Mony _{25, from Kandal} | "Bong Khos Hery" | — | — | — | — |
| 13 | Yen Mouyheng _{16, from Kampong Cham} | "Prous Bong Srolanh Ke Klang" | | — | — | — |

=== Episode 4: March 27, 2016 ===
| Order | Artist | Song | Coaches and artists choices | | | |
| Order | Artist | Song | Reach | Sophea | Kanha | Reth |
|---|---|---|---|---|---|---|
| 1 | Leng Thida _{19, from Preah Sihanouk} | "Ors Sneh Tae Min Chong Bat Borng Bong" | | | | |
| 2 | Nou Rattana _{16, from Banteay Meanchey} | "Sarang Oun" | — | — | — | — |
| 3 | Chhoeun Chet _{19, from Battambang} | "Srolanh Bong Kmean Anakot Te" | | | — | |
| 4 | Mak Teprindaro _{21, from Phnom Penh} | "Deng Te Tha Khnom Chheu Chab" | — | | — | |
| 5 | Touch Sovankiri _{23, from Phnom Penh} | "Tov Yok Bdey Barang" | — | — | — | — |
| 6 | So Sophalin _{17, from Kampot} | "She's Gone" | | | | |
| 7 | Ly Chetra _{21, from Phnom Penh} | "Yerng Chea Neak Sre Trov Cher Neak Sre Doch Knea" | — | — | — | — |
| 8 | En Sereyvong _{21, from Kampong Cham} | "Deng Te Tha Knhom Chheu Chab" | — | | — | — |
| 9 | Cheat Sochchaka _{16, from Phnom Penh} | "Nerk Ptas" | — | — | — | — |
| 10 | Sothy Panha _{22, from Kompong Speu} | "Mean Songsa Doch Ort Songsa" | | — | | |
| 11 | Vuth Polene _{31, from Phnom Penh} | "Songsa Kro Chunpo Oun" | — | — | — | — |
| 12 | Khy Sokhun _{22, from Kompong Thom} | "Chheu Pek Terb Yum" | | — | | |
| 13 | Long Rattana _{19, from Battambang} | "Ter Mean Bot Chomreang Mouy Na Oy Bong Nerk Oun" | | — | | — |

=== Episode 5: April 03, 2016 ===
| Order | Artist | Song | Coaches and artists choices | | | |
| Order | Artist | Song | Reach | Sophea | Kanha | Reth |
|---|---|---|---|---|---|---|
| 1 | Ouch Songva _{21, from Kandal} | "Knhom Som Sroverng" | — | — | — | — |
| 2 | Choun Nakry _{22, from Oddor Meanchey} | "Oun Nov Sneh Bong Doch Tngai Mon Te" | | | | |
| 3 | Bi Kimsin _{25, from Preah Vihear} | "Reatrey Bat Oun" | — | — | — | |
| 4 | Tang Lin Alene _{20, from Phnom Penh} | "Ber Sin Kmean Neary Mneak Nus Bong Srolanh Oun Te" | — | | — | |
| 5 | Oeng Mouykea _{21, from Phnom Penh} | "Flashlight" | | — | | — |
| 6 | Oern Dith _{21, from Siem Reap} | "Tov Yok Bdey Barang" | — | — | — | — |
| 7 | Srey Neang _{22, from Phnom Penh} | "Chkout Prous Sneh Bong" | — | — | — | — |
| 8 | Pov Veasna _{22, from Battambang} | "Chenh Chean Neang Dai" | | — | | — |
| 9 | Im Hoklin _{20, from Phnom Penh} | "Kompul Sneh Ery Oun Yum Reong Avey" | — | | — | — |
| 10 | Soerng Sreyleak _{19, from Phnom Penh} | "Hav Soben" | — | — | — | — |
| 11 | Sovath Tana _{26, from Siem Reap} | "Sbot Muk Preah" | — | — | — | — |
| 12 | Oung Sovannarith _{22, from Takeo} | "Deng Te Tha Knhom Chheu Chab" | | | — | |
| 13 | Chom Somphors _{32, from Phnom Penh} | "Ber Min Srolanh Anet Tver Avey" | | — | — | — |

=== Episode 6: April 10, 2016 ===
| Order | Artist | Song | Coaches and artists choices | | | |
| Order | Artist | Song | Reach | Sophea | Kanha | Reth |
|---|---|---|---|---|---|---|
| 1 | Nget Soraingsey _{22, from Phnom Penh} | "Krodas" | | | | |
| 2 | Ngin Sophat _{19, from Kandal} | "Snam Sneh Tnoat Te" | — | — | — | — |
| 3 | Run Rotha _{26, from Kandal} | "Kompul Sneh Ery Oun Yum Reong Avey" | | ✘ | — | |
| 4 | Ngoun Sreynich _{19, from Kandal} | "Sdab Bot Chomreang Ho Terk Pnek" | — | — | — | — |
| 5 | Chan Sovannara _{22, from Kracheh} | "Everyday" | — | | — | — |
| 6 | Eam Banna _{24, from Takeo} | "Bontob Choul Aphorb" | — | — | — | — |
| 7 | Soun Sreynak _{22, from Phnom Penh} | "Chan Knong Besdong" | | | | |
| 8 | Khin Hunchiva _{27, from Battambang} | "Terk Ler Sleuk Chuk" | — | — | — | — |
| 9 | Chhun Bunheng _{29, from Prey Veng} | "Monus Srae Doch Yerng" | — | — | | — |
| 10 | Tuy Rattanak _{23, from Kandal} | "Deng Te Tha Knhom Chheu Chab" | — | — | — | — |
| 11 | Tit Sophat _{30, from Kracheh} | "Krav Pi Oun Min Yok Propun" | | | | |

== The Second Phase: The Battle ==
Colour Key
Coach hit his/her "I WANT YOU" button
Artist defaulted to this coaches team
Artist elected to join this coaches team
Artist won the Battle and advanced to the Live shows
Artist lost the Battle and was eliminated
Artist lost the Battle but was stolen by another coach and advances to the Live shows

=== Episode 7: April 17, 2016 ===
| Order | Coach | Artists | | Song | Coaches and artists choices | | | |
| Order | Coach | Artists | | Song | Reach | Sophea | Kanha | Reth |
|---|---|---|---|---|---|---|---|---|
| 1 | Chhorn Sovannareach | Chom Somphors | Koek Sovanneang | "Panher Sneh" | — | - | - | - |
| 2 | Nop Bayyareth | Sorm Saosovanna | Sam Loka | "Yob Mouy Nov Phnom Penh" | - | - | | — |
| 3 | Pich Sophea | Chheng Danich | Tang Lin Alene | "Kmean Tngai Banh Chob" | - | — | - | - |
| 4 | Nop Bayyareth | Oung Sovannarith | Chhoeun Chet | "Neak Na Chea Mchas Besdong Oun" | | | | — |
| 5 | Aok Sokunkanha | Chhay Nakhim | Pov Veasna | "Saob" | - | - | — | - |
| 6 | Chhorn Sovannareach | Tak Narita | Ket Veasna | "Phleang Tlak Knong Besdong" | — | - | - | - |

=== Episode 8: April 24, 2016 ===
| Order | Coach | Artists | | Song | Coaches and artists choices | | | |
| Order | Coach | Artists | | Song | Reach | Sophea | Kanha | Reth |
|---|---|---|---|---|---|---|---|---|
| 1 | Aok Sokunkanha | Reth Suzana | Oeng Mouykea | "Girl On Fire" | - | - | — | - |
| 2 | Chhorn Sovannareach | So Sophalin | Choun Nakry | "Yum Oy Thleay Trung" | — | - | - | - |
| 3 | Aok Sokunkanha | Chhun Bunheng | Pom Phearom | "Lombak Tae Aeng" | | - | — | |
| 4 | Pich Sophea | Mak Teprindaro | Chea Sarun | "Kom Ael Sneh" | - | — | - | - |
| 5 | Nop Bayyareth | Bi Kimsin | Thy Vandy | "Haek Besdong" | - | - | - | — |
| 6 | Aok Sokunkanha | Ton Chanseyma | Long Rattana | "Mouy Neaty" | - | | — | - |

=== Episode 9: May 01, 2016 ===
| Order | Coach | Artists | | Song | Coaches and artists choices | | | |
| Order | Coach | Artists | | Song | Reach | Sophea | Kanha | Reth |
|---|---|---|---|---|---|---|---|---|
| 1 | Pich Sophea | Houn Som Oul | Chan Sovannara | "Cham Terk Pnek Bong Sngout Sin" | - | — | - | - |
| 2 | Aok Sokunkanha | Thel Thai | Khy Sokhun | "Kherng Reu Saob Arch Chae Bong Ban" | | | — | |
| 3 | Nop Bayyareth | Leng Thida | Morm Sreynou | "Sngat Sngat Som Bek" | — | - | - | — |
| 4 | Chhorn Sovannareach | Tit Sophat | Sothy Panha | "Nerk Monus Mneak Del Min Thlorb Chob Srolanh Knhom" | — | - | - | |
| 5 | Pich Sophea | Khem Lyhong | Im Hoklin | "Lers Pi Fan Ban Ort" | — | — | - | — |
| 6 | Chhorn Sovannareach | Nget Soraingsey | Yen Mouyheng | "Banh Chhop Chet Nerk" | — | - | - | — |

=== Episode 10: May 08, 2016 ===
| Order | Coach | Artists | | Song | Coaches and artists choices | | | |
| Order | Coach | Artists | | Song | Reach | Sophea | Kanha | Reth |
|---|---|---|---|---|---|---|---|---|
| 1 | Nop Bayyareth | Chhin Rattanak | Run Rotha | "Srolanh Knea Yu Hery Mdech Bontor Teat Min Ban" | — | | | — |
| 2 | Pich Sophea | San Sreylai | Phay Kakkada | "Choal Ruk Bong Tov Sneh Neak Na" | — | — | - | — |
| 3 | Chhorn Sovannareach | Khun Veasna | Nav Puthy | "Chong Boboul Oun Mok Chheu Chab" | — | — | | — |
| 4 | Nop Bayyareth | Chao Sokmey | Sorm Pisey | "Sorry Seem To Be The Hardest Word" | — | — | — | — |
| 5 | Aok Sokunkanha | Chhean Narin | Soun Sreynak | "Arunnortey" | — | — | — | — |
| 6 | Pich Sophea | En Sereyvong | Preung Chanmony | "Somrach Chet" | — | — | — | — |

== The Third Phase: Live Show ==
Artist automatically advanced by public vote
Artist was saved by coach's choice
Artist was eliminated

=== Episode 11: Week 1, May 15, 2016 ===
| Order | Coach | Artists | Song | Result |
|---|---|---|---|---|
| 1 | Nop Bayyareth | Sorm Pisey | "I Got You" | Eliminated |
| 2 | Nop Bayyareth | Oung Sovannarith | "Cham Tang Trodor" | Rith's Choice |
| 3 | Nop Bayyareth | Bi Kimsim | "Min Arch Khvas Thlai | Eliminated |
| 4 | Nop Bayyareth | Chhin Rattanak | "Baby I'm Sorry" | Public Vote |
| 5 | Aok Sokunkanha | Chhean Narin | "Dork Chet" | Eliminated |
| 6 | Aok Sokunkanha | Nav Puthy | "Dermbey Avey Tov Oun" | Eliminated |
| 7 | Aok Sokunkanha | Ton Chanseyma | "100 Pheak Roy" | Kanha's Choice |
| 8 | Aok Sokunkanha | Thel Thai | "Bong Pi Mon Chkout Bat Hery" | Public Vote |
| 9 | Pich Sophea | En Sereyvong | "Chheu Chab Kandal Phlov" | Sophea's Choice |
| 10 | Pich Sophea | Houn Som Oul | "Preah Vihear Saksey Sneh" | Eliminated |
| 11 | Pich Sophea | Run Rotha | "Thnorm" | Eliminated |
| 12 | Pich Sophea | Long Rattana | "Som Choup Mouy Morng Chong Kroy Mon Bek" | Public Vote |
| 13 | Chhorn Sovannareach | Khun Veasna | "Nov Neng Ke Oun Ban Sok Ort" | Eliminated |
| 14 | Chhorn Sovannareach | Nget Soraingsey | "Som Pel Ley Lok" | Reach's Choice |
| 15 | Chhorn Sovannareach | Chhoeun Chet | "Sok Sok Songsa Som Bek" | Eliminated |
| 16 | Chhorn Sovannareach | Tit Sophat | "Kbot Hous Tov Hery" | Public Vote |

=== Episode 12: Week 2, May 22, 2016 ===
| Order | Coach | Artists | Song | Result |
|---|---|---|---|---|
| 1 | Aok Sokunkanha | Chhun Bunheng | "Mchas Steung Brae Chet" | Eliminated |
| 2 | Aok Sokunkanha | Chhay Nakhim | "Dork Dongherm Ho Terk Phnek" | Kanha's Choice |
| 3 | Aok Sokunkanha | Sam Loka | "Snam Nangkorl Sneh" | Eliminated |
| 4 | Aok Sokunkanha | Reth Suzana | "My Heart Will Go On" | Public Vote |
| 5 | Pich Sophea | Mak Teprindaro | "Mean Neak Na Laor Cheang Bong Oun Srolanh Ke Tov" | Sophea's Choice |
| 6 | Pich Sophea | Chheng Danich | "Srolanh Knea Rorb Chhnam Ban Troem Songsa" | Eliminated |
| 7 | Pich Sophea | Khem Lyhong | "Songsa Chas Nov Tae Somkhan" | Eliminated |
| 8 | Pich Sophea | San Sreylai | "Kom Lerk Tourasab Ke Pel Nov Kbae Oun" | Public Vote |
| 9 | Chhorn Sovannareach | Tak Narita | "Songsa Chas Nov Tae Somkhan" | Eliminated |
| 10 | Chhorn Sovannareach | Chom Somphors | "Ber Bong Mean Thmey Oun Sabay Chet Te" | Eliminated |
| 11 | Chhorn Sovannareach | So Sophalin | "You Better Stop" | Reach's Choice |
| 12 | Chhorn Sovannareach | Khy Sokhun | "Mean Songsa Chrern Mles" | Public Vote |
| 13 | Nop Bayyareth | Sorm Saosovanna | "Robam Chong Sneh" | Public Vote |
| 14 | Nop Bayyareth | Leng Thida | "Ke Tha Oun Lngong Nas Del Nov Sneh Bong" | Rith's Choice |
| 15 | Nop Bayyareth | Pom Phearom | "Bdey Deng Khos Hery" | Eliminated |
| 16 | Nop Bayyareth | Sothy Panha | "Chong Tver Songsa Oun" | Eliminated |

=== Episode 13: Week 3, May 29, 2016 ===
| Order | Coach | Artists | Song | Result |
|---|---|---|---|---|
| 1 | Pich Sophea | San Sreylai | "Kchol Bork Chol Pnek" | Public Vote |
| 2 | Pich Sophea | Mak Teprindaro | "Srolanh Oun Rohot" | Sophea's Choice |
| 3 | Pich Sophea | Long Rattana | Nov Kroy Knong Bong | Eliminated |
| 4 | Pich Sophea | En Sereyvong | "Donderng Kon Ke" | Public Vote |
| 5 | Chhorn Sovannareach | Tit Sophat | Ah Neth Meas Bong | Eliminated |
| 6 | Chhorn Sovannareach | So Sophalin | "Terk Pnek Pel Yob" | Reach's Choice |
| 7 | Chhorn Sovannareach | Khy Sokhun | "Mon Bong Skorl Ke Oun Nov Aena" | Public Vote |
| 8 | Chhorn Sovannareach | Nget Soraingsey | "Sayonara Sneh" | Public Vote |
| 9 | Nop Bayyareth | Chhin Rattanak | "Bong Mean Thmey Oun Mean Ke" | Rith's Choice |
| 10 | Nop Bayyareth | Oung Sovannarith | "Besdong 100" | Eliminated |
| 11 | Nop Bayyareth | Leng Thida | "Chheu Chab Mouy Lean Dong" | Public Vote |
| 12 | Nop Bayyareth | Sorm Saosovanna | "When A Man Loves A Woman" | Public Vote |
| 13 | Aok Sokunkanha | Ton Chanseyma | "Cry Me Out" | Eliminated |
| 14 | Aok Sokunkanha | Thel Thai | "Saob" | Kanha's Choice |
| 15 | Aok Sokunkanha | Reth Suzana | "Rolling in The Deep" | Public Vote |
| 16 | Aok Sokunkanha | Chhay Nakhim | "Chheu Chab Toch Tach" | Public Vote |

=== Episode 14: Week 4, June 05, 2016 ===
| Order | Coach | Artists | Song | Result |
|---|---|---|---|---|
| 1 | Chhorn Sovannareach | Nget Soraingsey | "Come Back To Me" | Reach's Choice |
| 2 | Chhorn Sovannareach | So Sophalin | I am Sorry | Eliminated |
| 3 | Chhorn Sovannareach | Khy Sokhun | "Smos Pon Neng Min Lmorm" | Public Vote |
| 4 | Nop Bayyareth | Sorm Saosovanna | "Domnaeng Sneh" | Public Vote |
| 5 | Nop Bayyareth | Chhin Rattanak | "Prous Ke Chong Chob" | Rith's Choice |
| 6 | Nop Bayyareth | Leng Thida | "Sabay Nas Reu Pel Del Khernh Srey Yum" | Eliminated |
| 7 | Aok Sokunkanha | Chhay Nakhim | "Deng Ort Tha Bong Kompong Nerk Oun" | Eliminated |
| 8 | Aok Sokunkanha | Reth Suzana | "Ti Nis Mean Monus Khoch Chet" | Kanha's Choice |
| 9 | Aok Sokunkanha | Thel Thai | "Kom Oy Ke Chheu Chab Doy Sa Bong" | Public Vote |
| 10 | Pich Sophea | En Sereyvong | "Prom Oy Boak Prom Tver Thoak Prom Srolanh Oun" | Sophea's Choice |
| 11 | Pich Sophea | San Sreylai | "Dors Sa" | Public Vote |
| 12 | Pich Sophea | Mak Teprindaro | "Vettanea Chet" | Eliminated |

=== Episode 15: Week 5, Semi-Final, June 12, 2016 ===
| Order | Coach | Artists | First Song | Second Song | Result |
|---|---|---|---|---|---|
| 1 | Nop Bayyareth | Chhin Rattanak | "Terk Luy Somlab Terk Chet Knhom" | "Ches Tae Sromai" | Advanced |
| 2 | Nop Bayyareth | Sorm Saosovanna | "Kbot Bong Dermbey Avey" | "Reab Ka Neng Bong Ban Te" | Eliminated |
| 3 | Aok Sokunkanha | Thel Thai | "Chom Ngeu Khvas Neak Thae Rous Ban Yu Pon Na" | "Sbot Hous Samai" | Advanced |
| 4 | Aok Sokunkanha | Reth Suzana | "Pka Rik Knong Samot Terk Pnek" | "Blank Space" | Eliminated |
| 5 | Pich Sophea | En Sereyvong | "Songsa Louch Leak" | "Jrul Pek Hery" | Eliminated |
| 6 | Pich Sophea | San Sreylai | "Tous Yang Na Kor Nov Min Saob Bong" | "Min Kchey Tro" | Advanced |
| 7 | Chhorn Sovannareach | Khy Sokhun | "Lo Leam" | "Ban Hery" | Advanced |
| 8 | Chhorn Sovannareach | Nget Soraingsey | "Kron Tae Srolanh Bong Ter Oun Khos Trong Na" | "Merl Ey Neng" | Eliminated |

=== Episode 16: Week 6, Final, June 19, 2016 ===
Key
Winner
Runner-up

| Order | Coach | Artists | First Song | Second Song (Duet) | Third Song | Result |
|---|---|---|---|---|---|---|
| 1 | Reach | Khy Sokhun | "Nisai Chea Prean Kor Mean Besdong" | "Right Here Waiting" | "Chet Oun Yang Na" | Runner-up |
| 2 | Sophea | San Sreylai | "Chhob Chheu Chhob Terk Pnek" | "Pherk Loung Kloun Aeng" | "Bong Ches Kbot Oun Oun Kor Ches Kbot Bong" | Runner-up |
| 3 | Kanha | Thel Thai | "Tourasab Atreat Kleat Sneh" | "Pel Bong Chas Tov" | "Kromom Lerng Thlai" | Winner |
| 4 | Rith | Chhin Rattanak | "Songsa Ery Plech Bong Min Ban" | "Bong Neng Oun" | "Songsa Loy Pek" | Runner-up |

== Elimination Chart ==
=== Overall ===
Color key
Artist's info

- Team Reach
- Team Sophea
- Team Kanha
- Team Reth

Result details

- Winner
- Runner-up
- Artist was saved by public vote
- Artist was saved by his/her coach
- Artist was eliminated
- Artist did not perform on that particular week

Live show results per week
| Artist | Week 1 | Week 2 | Week 3 | Week 4 | Week 5 | Finals |
|---|---|---|---|---|---|---|
| Thel Thai | Safe | | Safe | Safe | Safe | Winner |
| Chinn Rattanak | Safe | | Safe | Safe | Safe | Runner-up |
| Khy Sokhun | | Safe | Safe | Safe | Safe | Runner-up |
| San Sreylai | | Safe | Safe | Safe | Safe | Runner-up |
| En Sereyvong | Safe | | Safe | Safe | Eliminated | Eliminated (Week 5) |
| Nget Soraingsey | Safe | | Safe | Safe | Eliminated | Eliminated (Week 5) |
| Reth Suzana | | Safe | Safe | Safe | Eliminated | Eliminated (Week 5) |
| Sorm Saosovanna | | Safe | Safe | Safe | Eliminated | Eliminated (Week 5) |
| Chhay Nakhim | | Safe | Safe | Eliminated | Eliminated (Week 4) | |
| Leng Thida | | Safe | Safe | Eliminated | Eliminated (Week 4) | |
| Mak Teprindaro | | Safe | Safe | Eliminated | Eliminated (Week 4) | |
| So Sophalin | | Safe | Safe | Eliminated | Eliminated (Week 4) | |
| Long Rattana | Safe | | Eliminated | Eliminated (Week 3) | | |
| Oung Sovannarith | Safe | | Eliminated | Eliminated (Week 3) | | |
| Tit Sophat | Safe | | Eliminated | Eliminated (Week 3) | | |
| Ton Chanseyma | Safe | | Eliminated | Eliminated (Week 3) | | |
| Chheng Danich | | Eliminated | Eliminated (Week 2) | | | |
| Chhun Bunheng | | Eliminated | Eliminated (Week 2) | | | |
| Chom Somphors | | Eliminated | Eliminated (Week 2) | | | |
| Khem Lyhong | | Eliminated | Eliminated (Week 2) | | | |
| Pom Phearom | | Eliminated | Eliminated (Week 2) | | | |
| Sam Loka | | Eliminated | Eliminated (Week 2) | | | |
| Sothy Panha | | Eliminated | Eliminated (Week 2) | | | |
| Tak Narita | | Eliminated | Eliminated (Week 2) | | | |
| Bi Kimsim | Eliminated | Eliminated (Week 1) | | | | |
| Chhean Narin | Eliminated | Eliminated (Week 1) | | | | |
| Chhoeun Chet | Eliminated | Eliminated (Week 1) | | | | |
| Houn Som Oul | Eliminated | Eliminated (Week 1) | | | | |
| Khun Veasnan | Eliminated | Eliminated (Week 1) | | | | |
| Nav Ruthy | Eliminated | Eliminated (Week 1) | | | | |
| Run Rotha | Eliminated | Eliminated (Week 1) | | | | |
| Sorm Pisey | Eliminated | Eliminated (Week 1) | | | | |
