= The Voice Cambodia season 1 =

The Voice Cambodia
- Season 1
- Hosted by: Chea Vibol; Chan Keonimol
- Judges: Aok Sokunkanha; Pich Sophea; Chhorn Sovannareach; Nop Bayyareth
- Winner: Buth Seiha
- Runners-up: Soy Ratanak; Khun Vutha; Chamreun Sopheak

Release
- Original network: Hang Meas HDTV
- Original release: 3 August – 16 November 2014

Season chronology
- Next → Season 2

The Voice Cambodia (Season 1) is a Cambodian reality talent show that was aired from 3 August to 16 November 2014 on Hang Meas HDTV. Based on the reality singing competition The Voice of Holland, the series was created by Dutch television producer John de Mol. It is part of an international series.

== The First Phase: The Blind Auditions ==
Key	Coach hit his or her "I WANT YOU" button	Contestant eliminated with no coach pressing his or her "I WANT YOU" button	Contestant defaulted to this coach's team	Contestant elected to join this coach's team

=== Episode 1: August 03, 2014 ===
Order	Contestant	Song	Coaches' and Contestants' Choices			
Order	Contestant	Song	Reach	Sophea	Kanha	Rith
1	Van Phally _{21, from Battambang}	"Sday Kroy - ស្តាយក្រោយ "				—
2	Meas Rachana _{25, from Kampong Cham}	"Chkout Jet Prous Srolanh Oun - ឆ្កួតចិត្តព្រោះស្រលាញ់អូន "				
3	So Vannita _{24, from Phnom Penh}	"Janh Krup Yang Prous Oun Srolanh Bong - ចាញ់គ្រប់យ៉ាងព្រោះអូនស្រលាញ់បង "			—	
4	Kosal Houtchenda _{20, from Battambang}	"Bong Nek Ke Dol Thnak Jong Chheu - បងនឹកគេដល់ថ្នាក់ចង់ឈឺ "	—	—	—	—
5	Eum Run _{23, from Siem Reap}	"Pel Oun Mean Thmey Bong Tver Avey Kor Khos - ពេលបងមានថ្មីបងធ្វើអ្វីក៏បាន"	—		—	—
6	Neak Phoung Sophy _{23, from Kampot}	"Bong Pi Mun Bat Tov Na - បងពីមុនបាត់ទៅណា "			—	
7	Rith Borey _{19, from Battambang}	"Aknusavry Battambang - អនុស្សាវរីយបាត់ដំបង "	—	—	—	—
8	Vong Dara Ratana _{31, from Phnom Penh}	"Kon Bros Khos Hery - កូនប្រុសខុសហើយ "		—		
9	Lach Sear _{20, from Phnom Penh}	"She Will Be Loved"		—		—
10	Prok Chanthorn _{37, from Kampong Cham}	"Ronoch Khae Prang - រនោចខែប្រាំង "	—	—	—	—
11	Reth Reachany _{22, from Kampong Cham}	"1000 Reatrey - ១ពាន់រាត្រី "	—	—	—	—
12	Sou Siryka _{18, from Phnom Penh}	"Kmean Tngai Oun Min Yum - គ្មានថ្ងៃអូនមិនយំ "				

=== Episode 2: August 10, 2014 ===
Order	Contestant	Song	Coaches' and Contestants' Choices			
Order	Contestant	Song	Reach	Sophea	Kanha	Rith
1	You Bandith _{22, from Phnom Penh}	"Nek Nas Cham Turasab Thlai - នឹកណាស់ចាំទូរស័ព្ទថ្លៃ "	—	—	—	—
2	Mong Vimean _{25, from Pailin}	"Si Chhnoul Thae Songsa Oy Ke - ស៊ីឈ្នួលថែសង្សារឲ្យគេ "		—	—	—
3	Tav Bopha _{27, from Siem Reap}	"Sdab Ring Ring Tune Bong Oun Srok Tek Phnek - ស្តាប់ Ring Ring Tune បងអូនស្រក់ទឹកភ្នែក "			—	—
4	Mam Sopharath _{18, from Phnom Penh}	"I Won't Let You Go"	—			
5	Kheng Vannak _{23, from Prey Veng}	"Saob Kloun Eng - ស្អប់ខ្លួនឯង "	—	—	—	—
6	Roeun Makara _{18, from Battambang}	"175 Tngai - ១៧៥ថ្ងៃ "	—	—	—	—
7	Chhay Sovy _{24, from Siem Reap}	"Phnom Penh Nek Kampong Cham - ភ្នំពេញនឹកកំពង់ចាម "	—	—	—	
8	Meas Narin _{25, from Preah Vihear}	"Knhom Som Sro Veng - ខ្ញុំសុំស្រវឹង "				
9	Lee Lin _{24, from Kampong Cham}	"Pram Chnam Reu Pram Khae - ៥ឆ្នាំ៥ខែ "	—	—	—	—
10	Ol Sokchan _{22, from Kampong Cham}	"Besdong Neak Prodal - បេះដូងអ្នកប្រដាល់ "		—		—
11	Vichet Damara _{20, from Preah Sihanouk}	"Boyfriend"	—		—	—
12	Pich Sika _{16, from Battambang}	"Srolanh Keu Leas Bong - ស្រលាញ់គឺលះបង់ "			—	
13	Huy Sreyhouch _{22, from Siem Reap}	"101 Het Phal - ១០១ ហេតុផល "	—	—		—

=== Episode 3: August 17, 2014 ===
Order	Contestant	Song	Coaches' and Contestants' Choices			
Order	Contestant	Song	Reach	Sophea	Kanha	Rith
1	Thida & Voleak _{18 & 16, from Phnom Penh}	"Let It Go"	—		—	
2	Rous Serey Sophea _{25, from Kampong Cham}	"Tuk Orkas Oy Bong Klas Ban te? - ទុកឱកាសឲ្យបងខ្លះបានទេ? "			—	—
3	Yeung Dalin _{19, from Phnom Penh}	"Tver Mech Knhom Men Saart Doch Ke - ធ្វើម៉ិចខ្ញុំមិនស្អាតដូចគេ "	—	—	—	—
4	Keo Samnang _{27, from Kampong Cham}	"Krav Pi Oun Min Yok Propun - ក្រៅពីអូនមិនយកប្រពន្ធ "			—	
5	Phan Vanda _{18, from Kompong Cham}	"Srolanh Pek Terb Ho Tek Phnek - ស្រលាញ់ពេកទើបទឹកភ្នែកហូរ "	—	—	—	—
6	Sen Sai _{34, from Siem Reap}	"Set Trem Jea Mit - សិទ្ធិត្រឹមជាមិត្ត "	—	—	—	—
7	Sorn Sreypov _{23, from Takeo}	"Chkout Prous Sneah Bong - ឆ្កួតព្រោះស្នេហ៍បង "				
8	Noun Vuthy _{25, from Battambang}	"Sonya Srok Sre - សន្យាស្រុកស្រែ "	—		—	—
9	Va Sochetra _{25, from Phnom Penh}	"Skinny Love"	—	—		—
10	Khan Sokhean _{23, from Kampong Cham}	"Dermbey Avey Tov Oun - ដើម្បីអ្វីអូន "				
11	Chum Sokha _{23, from Siem Reap}	"Tver Mech Knhom Min Saart Doch Ke - ធ្វើម៉ិចខ្ញុំមិនស្អាតដូចគេ "	—	—	—	—
12	Heang Sopheaktra _{24, from Battambang}	"Mouy Khae Dob Tngai - មួយខែដប់ថ្ងៃ "			—	
13	Soy Ratanak _{24, from Kampong Chhnang}	"Kmean Lerk Ti Pi - គ្មានលើកទីពីរ "	—		—	—

=== Episode 4: August 24, 2014 ===
Order	Contestant	Song	Coaches' and Contestants' Choices			
Order	Contestant	Song	Reach	Sophea	Kanha	Rith
1	Ban Monileak _{19, from Battambang}	"Chkout Prous Sneah Bong - ឆ្កួតព្រោះស្នេហ៍បង "		—	—	
2	Ly Sokneth _{25, from Battambang}	"Mun Bong Skorl Ke Oun Nov Eh Na? - មុនបងស្គាល់គេអូននៅឯណា? "				—
3	Sok Channea _{34, from Tbong Khmum}	"Mneak Srolanh Mneak Anit - ម្នាក់ស្រលាញ់ ម្នាក់អាណិត "	—		—	—
4	Som Ol Odes _{23, from Phnom Penh}	"Your Man"	—	—	—	—
5	Chhin Sreynech _{20, from Kampong Speu}	"Kmean Nak Na Laor Jeang Sangsa Knhom - គ្មានអ្នកណាល្អជាងសង្សារខ្ញុំ "	—	—	—	—
6	Chheav Loeun _{29, from Siem Reap}	"Tek Ler Slek Chhouk - ទឹកលើស្លឹកឈូក "				
7	Chum Dara _{21, from Preah Sihanouk}	"Bong Pi Mun Chkout Bat Hery - បងពីមុនឆ្កួតបាត់ហើយ "		—	—	
8	Keo Sopanha _{21, from Phnom Penh}	"Pentuk 100 - ពិន្ទុ ១០០ "		—		
9	Chea Sophea _{24, from Kampong Speu}	"Mern Yoch Sneah - ម៉ឺនយោជន៍ស្នេហ៍ "	—	—	—	—
10	Heng Chan Visal _{21, from Phnom Penh}	"Besdong Nak Prodal - បេះដូងអ្នកប្រដាល់ "	—		—	—
11	Meak Phalkun _{17, from Phnom Penh}	"Sonya Mun Keng - សន្យាមុនគេង "	—	—	—	—
12	Sun Lyheang _{21, from Kampong Cham}	"Nek Oun Pel Pleang Tlak - នឹកអូនពេលភ្លៀងធ្លាក់ "		—	—	—
13	Sophea Samnang _{33, from Phnom Penh}	"Besdong Torl Chrok - បេះដូងទាល់ច្រក "		—	—	

=== Episode 5: August 31, 2014 ===
Order	Contestant	Song	Coaches' and Contestants' Choices			
Order	Contestant	Song	Reach	Sophea	Kanha	Rith
1	Sok Chenda _{29, from Banteay Meanchey}	"Propun Neak Na Pnher Tek Pnek Mok"	—		—	—
2	Khun Vutha _{23, from Prey Veng}	"Men Srolanh Anet Tver Avey"				
3	Heng Kihour _{18, from Phnom Penh}	"Ter Ke Deng Bong Chheu Jab Te?"	—	—	—	—
4	So Pheach _{22, from Siem Reap}	"Sarapheap Sneah Te Oun Men Srolanh"	—			—
5	Samut Sreyka _{23, from Phnom Penh}	"Besdong Eka"	—	—	—	
6	Koeun Nophealey _{20, from Phnom Penh}	"When I Was Your Man"			—	—
7	Chhim Chivorn _{21, from Phnom Penh}	"Chkout Jet Prous Srolanh Oun"	—	—	—	—
8	Mam Sina _{21, from Prey Veng}	"Mean Jeat Kroy Jam Joub Knea"		—	—	—
9	Da Somavatey _{17, from Phnom Penh}	"Sdab Bot Jomreang Ho Tek Pnek"	—	—	—	—
10	Chenda Vita _{23, from Phnom Penh}	"Ter Mean Bot Jomreang Mouy Na Tver Oy Bong Nek Oun?"				
11	Sok Marin _{26, from Kampong Cham}	"Chheu Chheu Chheu"	—	—	—	
12	Som Sodalin _{22, from Phnom Penh}	"Ke Laor Krop Yang Te Oun Srolanh Bong"	—	—	—	—
13	Keo Bunthea _{26, from Battambang}	"Mean Songsa Doch Ot Songsa"			—	—

=== Episode 6: September 7, 2014 ===
Order	Contestant	Song	Coaches' and Contestants' Choices			
Order	Contestant	Song	Reach	Sophea	Kanha	Rith
1	Yim Dara _{36, from Battambang}	"Boros Mneak Del Ket Dol Oun"	—	—	—	—
2	Buth Seiha _{18, from Kampong Speu}	"Deng Te Tha Knhom Chheu"			—	
3	Sound Sovan Channy _{17, from Phnom Penh}	"Deng Te Tha Knhom Chheu"	—	—	—	
4	Nun Dem _{23, from Kampot}	"Call Mok Bong Pel Ke Bosbong Oun"	—	—	—	—
5	Kak Sokheng _{26, from Siem Reap}	"Bong Pi Mun Chkout Bat Hery"	—	—		—
6	Tray Doch _{23, from Preah Sihanouk}	"Yoo Ponna Kor Jam"	—		—	—
7	Chamreun Sopheak _{23, from Phnom Penh}	"Kmean Tngai Oun Min Yum"		—	—	
8	Khat Sreynech _{21, from Phnom Penh}	"Hurt"		—		
9	San Chanleakhena _{18, from Phnom Penh}	"Bleeding Love"	—	—	—	—
10	Pach Kimmouy _{20, from Battambang}	"Ter Mean Bot Jomreang Mouy Na Tver Oy Bong Nek Oun?"		—	—	
11	Ven Sotheara _{26, from Battambang}	"Khum Jet"	—	—	—	—
12	Keo Pilika _{20, from Siem Reap}	"Kmean Tngai Oun Min Yum"				

== The Second Phase: The Battle ==
Key	Artist won the Battle and advanced to the Live shows	Artist lost the Battle and was eliminated

=== Episode 7: September 14, 2014 ===
Order	Coach	Artists			Song
1	Sophea	Keo Bunthea	Noun Vuthy		"Khom Ham Jet De Te Men Chneah"
2	Reach	Pach Kimmouy	Mam Sina		"Songsa Leng Leng Srolanh Men Ten"
3	Kanha	Khun Vutha	Kak Sokheng		"Tuk Orkas Oy Bong Klas Ban Te"
4	Bayarith	Samuth Sreyka	Neak Phoung Sophy	Pich Sika	"Besdong 100"
5	Reach	Heang Sopheaktra	Sun Lyheang		"Mean Neang Kor Thunh Kmean Neang Kor Thunh"
6	Bayarith	Chheav Loeun	Mam Sopharath		"Slak Tek Phnek"

=== Episode 8: September 21, 2014 ===
Order	Coach	Artists			Song
1	Sophea	So Vannita	Sok Chenda		"Chheu Jab Mouy Lean Dong"
2	Reach	Ol Sokchan	Van Phally		"Beam Preah Mok Sbot Kor Men Jer"
3	Kanha	Sou Siryka	Va Sochetra	Khat Sreynech	"To Love Somebody"
4	Bayarith	Chamreun Sopheak	Sound Sovann Channy		"Kbot Hous Tov Hery"
5	Sophea	Sok Channea	Meas Narin		"Tov Yok Pdey Barang"
6	Kanha	Ly Sokneth	So Pheach		"Kmean Plov"

=== Episode 9: September 28, 2014 ===
Order	Coach	Artists			Song
1	Reach	Lach Sear	Koeun Nophealey		"Bad Day"
2	Kanha	Keo Pilika	Chenda Vita		"Ter Srey Deng Te"
3	Bayarith	Chhin Samnang	Sophea Samnang		"Chomnes Jis Kor Eng"
4	Reach	Mong Vimean	Rous Serey Sophea	Buth Seiha	"Os Sneah Te Men Jong Batbong Oun"
5	Bayarith	Meas Rachana	Sok Marin		"Mouy Lean Chnam"
6	Reach	Chum Dara	Ban Monileak		"Tek Phnek Pi Por"

=== Episode 10: October 5, 2014 ===
Order	Coach	Artists			Song
1	Kanha	Vong Dara Ratana	Sorn Sreypov		"Kou Sneah Kou Jomreang Jreang Bat Kou"
2	Sophea	Vichet Damara	Thida & Voleak		"Mercy"
3	Kanha	Huy Sreyhouch	Keo Sopanha		"Besdong Krodas"
4	Sophea	Soy Ratanak	Heng Chan Visal		"Luy Bong Min Dol Ke"
5	Sophea	Tray Doch	Tav Bopha	Eum Run	"Turosab Brab Oun"
6	Bayarith	Chhay Sovy	Khan Sokhean		"Het Avey Banhchheu Bong Teat?"

== The Third Phase: Live Show ==
Key	Artist automatically advanced by public vote	Artist saved by coach's choice

=== Episode 11: Week 1, October 12, 2014 ===
Order	Coach	Artists	Song	Result
1	Reach	Ban Monileak	"Pko Lorn Pailin"	Reach's Choice
2	Reach	Van Phally	"Somrek Besdong"	Public Vote
3	Reach	Sun Lyheang	"Srolanh Oun Klang Klang"	Eliminated
4	Sophea	Sok Channea	"Tngai Bak Roseal"	Eliminated
5	Sophea	Keo Bunthea	"Bak Jontol"	Sophea's Choice
6	Sophea	Eum Run	"Tek Chet Kon Bros"	Public Vote
7	Kanha	Vong Dara Ratana	"My Love Don't Cry"	Kanha's Choice
8	Kanha	Keo Sopanha	"Srolanh Monus Mnak Sen Pibak"	Eliminated
9	Kanha	Ly Sokneth	"Oh! Kdey Sneha"	Public Vote
10	Bayarith	Chhin Samnang	"Srok Tek Phnek Min Men Kmean Panhha Te"	Eliminated
11	Bayarith	Samut Sreyka	"Bong Dok Oun Smer Son"	Bayarith's Choice
12	Bayarith	Chheav Loeun	"Mean Het Phal Avey Klas Oy Oun SaOb Bong"	Public Vote

=== Episode 12: Week 2, October 19, 2014 ===
Order	Coach	Artists	Song	Result
1	Bayarith	Sok Marin	"Kom Oy Ke Chheu Jab Doy Sa Bong"	Eliminated
2	Bayarith	Chamreun Sopheak	"Ber Yerng Klay Chea Nak Dortey"	Bayarith's choice
3	Bayarith	Chhay Sovy	"Plech Sonya Sayorn"	Public Vote
4	Kanha	Chenda Vita	"Arom Pel Bek Knea"	Eliminated
5	Kanha	Khun Vutha	"Nak Tang Os Knea Neng Knhom"	Public Vote
6	Kanha	Sou Siryka	"Oun Chheu Jab Nas Bong Deng Te"	Kanha's choice
7	Sophea	Vichet Damara	"Happy"	Eliminated
8	Sophea	So Vannita	"Jong Ban Sneah Smos Pi Monus Kbot"	Sophea's choice
9	Sophea	Soy Ratanak	"Chheu Pek Terb Yum"	Public Vote
10	Reach	Buth Seiha	"Smos Bong Oun Slab Ey?"	Public Vote
11	Reach	Pach Kimmouy	"Monus Srey Mnak Nis Men Tun Chreay"	Eliminated
12	Reach	Lach Sear	"Price Tag"	Reach's choice

=== Episode 13: Week 3, October 26, 2014 ===
Order	Coach	Artists	Song	Result
1	Kanha	Ly Sokneth	"Songsa Dara"	Public Vote
2	Kanha	Khun Vutha	"Bros Na Min Yum"	Public Vote
3	Kanha	Vong Dara Ratana	"Smos Pon Ning Min Lmom"	Kanha's choice
4	Kanha	Sou Siryka	"Heartbreaker"	Eliminated
5	Reach	Van Phally	"Krub Kron"	Reach's choice
6	Reach	Ban Monileak	"Srolanh Bong Min Sday Kroy"	Public Vote
7	Reach	Lach Sear	"One More Night"	Eliminated
8	Reach	Buth Seiha	"Dak Tean Chet Smos"	Public Vote
9	Bayarith	Chhay Sovy	"Monus Sre Doch Yerng"	Eliminated
10	Bayarith	Chamreun Sopheak	"Ke Laor Ponna Terb Bong Plech Oun"	Public Vote
11	Bayarith	Chheav Loeun	"Dok Dongherm Ho Tek Phnek"	Public Vote
12	Bayarith	Samut Sreyka	"Songsa Ptorl Kloun"	Bayarith's choice
13	Sophea	Eum Run	"Bek Pi Oun Min Men Bong Mean Tmey"	Public Vote
14	Sophea	So Vannita	"Love VS. Friend"	Sophea's choice
15	Sophea	Keo Samnang	"Besdong Chet Dach Kyol"	Eliminated
16	Sophea	Soy Ratanak	"Troung Bram Hat Keu Bong"	Public Vote

=== Episode 14: Week 4, November 2, 2014 ===
Order	Coach	Artists	Song	Result
1	Sophea	Soy Ratanak	"Chheu Jab Bontech Mdong"	Sophea's choice
2	Sophea	So Vannita	"Chlery Somnour Oun Sen"	Eliminated
3	Sophea	Eum Run	"Jong Deng"	Public Vote
4	Bayarith	Samut Sreyka	"Bong Leng Serch Te Ke Men Ten"	Eliminated
5	Bayarith	Chheav Loeun	"Soben Kondal Atreat"	Bayarith's choice
6	Bayarith	Chamreun Sopheak	"Don't Walk Away"	Public Vote
7	Reach	Buth Seiha	"Khor Chev Tne Bram"	Public Vote
8	Reach	Van Phally	"Chhub Khoch Jet Teat Tov"	Reach's choice
9	Reach	Ban Monileak	"Bad Boy"	Eliminated
10	Kanha	Vong Dara Ratana	"Oy Bong Som Srolanh Phong"	Eliminated
11	Kanha	Khun Vutha	"Kloy Sneah Tnot Te"	Kanha's choice
12	Kanha	Ly Sokneth	"Somnob Chet"	Public Vote

=== Episode 15: Week 5, Semi-Final, November 9, 2014 ===
Order	Coach	Artists	First Song	Second Song	Result
1	Reach	Van Phally	"Kech Norok"	"Jrul Pek Hery"	Eliminated
2	Reach	Buth Seiha	"Chhub Trom"	"What Can I Do?"	Advanced
3	Kanha	Ly Sokneth	"Kom Pjea Yeam Somrok Tek Phnek"	"Mean Tmey Mdech Min Brab"	Eliminated
4	Kanha	Khun Vutha	"Em Men Ten"	"Bong Khos Hery"	Advanced
5	Bayarith	Chamreun Sopheak	"Sngob Chet"	"Hek Sneah Kbot Kombang Muk"	Advanced
6	Bayarith	Chheav Loeun	"Jam Bong Mean Sen"	"Dok Chet"	Eliminated
7	Sophea	Soy Ratanak	"Roy Pon Pnher Sa"	"Sexy Lady"	Advanced
8	Sophea	Eum Run	"Tuy Muy"	"Sat Momeach"	Eliminated

=== Episode 16: Week 6, Final, November 16, 2014 ===
Order	Coach	Artists	First Song	Second Song (Duet)	Third Song	Result
1	Sophea	Soy Ratanak	"Sbot Muk Preah Kor Bong Min Cheur"	"Chet Banhjea"	"Reung Ngeay Te"	Runner-up
2	Kanha	Khun Vutha	"Komdor Songsa Ke Chheu Chab"	"Leas Bong Oy Nak Ti Bey"	"Oun Som Bek Bong Som Lea"	Runner-up
3	Bayarith	Chamreun Sopheak	"Chomnong Bram Brokar"	"Sondan Chet Kbot Knong Kloun Monus Kbot"	"Songkear Besdong"	Runner-up
4	Reach	Buth Seiha	"Srolanh Bong Kmean Anakot Te"	"Ti Krong Kmean Mek"	"Kmean Oun Bong Nov Chea Bong"	Winner
