= Khemarak Sereymun =

Oknha Khemarak Sereymon
- ខេមរៈ សិរីមន្ត
- Born: Khem Bunthai; 3 November 1985 (age 40); Kampong Cham Province, People's Republic of Kampuchea
- Years active: 2003–present
- Musical career
- Genres: Pop, Khmer traditional music, blues
- Labels: U2 Entertainment (2003–2007); Sunday Production (2007–2017); Rasmey Hang Meas (2017–2022) Galaxy Navatra (2023–present)

Khem Bunthai (Khmer: ខេម ប៊ុនថៃ; born 3 November 1985), also known by his stage name Khemarak Sereymun (Khmer: ខេមរៈ សិរីមន្ត), is a Cambodian singer, actor and brand ambassador is known as a judge and a member of the Audit Committee, which evaluates the reality of the judge audition on X Factor Cambodia.

== Music career ==
=== Introduction to songs in U2 Entertainment 2003–2007 ===
In 2003 Khemarak Sereymun was selected by U2 Entertainment to sing in the production, and the first song that rocked U2 Production at the time and pushed him to rise to fame in the art world was "Heart of a Boxer." This song also made him a lot of support and many people began to know his name as a newcomer star and the next song is" as well as "Prom Tang ahlai" song "Prolit Bat Beong" are all songs Which received overwhelming support at the time. Until 2007, U2 Entertainment also announced the closure of its production due to bankruptcy due to competition and the size of the loss on the copying of U2 production to put on the market.

=== Participation in Sunday Production 2008–2016 ===
After the production of U2 Entertainment closed its company. Later, during 2008, Khemarak Sereymun joined Sunday Production, he continued to release albums as well as beautiful cover songs such as "Worried with the Moon" "I was wrong" "Leave the opportunity Some of you can" "Get a French husband" "Farmers also have dollars ", including some sweet songs released during the Khmer New Year, such as "Want a wife" and "Lost shoes". Sereymun also sang abroad, especially at the Cambodia–Thailand Friendship Concert to celebrate the 60th anniversary of Cambodian-Thai relations. In November 2010, he performed in Bangkok, Thailand. Khemarak Sereymun also went on to perform in the United States on August 17, 2011, with his sister (Khemarak Srey Pov), his singing partner in the Sunday production together for two months in that. Khemarak Sereymun also participated in the third large-scale Khmer film of Sunday Production, "Vampire" was opened and Officially released on November 21, 2012. Finally, he left Sunday Production in 2016 and joined Reaksmey Hang Meas Production in 2017, a giant production and one of the leading productions in Cambodia.

=== Participation in Reaksmey Hang Meas production 2017–2022 ===
In 2017, Khemarak Sereymun joined Reaksmey Hang Meas production. After taking refuge under the roof of Hang Meas production of singer Khemarak Sereymun is not easy, also immediately exploded support for the song, The first song released in this new production is "Stung Treng Bong Ery". Until 2018, Khemarak Sereymun wakes up his audience with a handshake with Thai veteran singer Tik Shiro, whose collaboration song is titled "Sad Man" and the two also sang together on the stage with a broadcast on Thai TV Channel 3.

== Achievements ==
Year	Category	Institution or publication	Result	Notes	Ref.
1999	Top 1 Singer Nestlé-Cambodia	Apsara TV-11	Won	Nestlé-Cambodia	
2011	Best Male Singer of Cambodia	Anachak Dara Awards	Won	Sabay Company	
2013	Cambodia Top Singer	Anachak Dara Awards	Won	Sabay Company	

== Discography ==
=== Solo albums ===
Title	Type	Artist	Released	Label
បេះដូងអ្នកប្រដាល់	Cover Version Khmer	Khemarak Sereymun	2003	U2 Entertainment
ព្រមទាំងអាល័យ	Cover Version Khmer	Khemarak Sereymun	2004	U2 Entertainment
អងន្ទងស្នេហ៍	Cover Version Khmer	Khemarak Sereymun	2005	U2 Entertainment

=== Partner albums ===
Title	Type	Artist	Released	Label
ម៉ែថា	Cover Version Khmer	Khemarak Sereymun ft. Aok Sokunkanha	2006	U2 Entertainment
Slow Motion	Cover Version Khmer	Khemarak Sereymun ft. Khemarak Serey Pov	2007	U2 Entertainment

== Performances ==
- 2013: Christmas Concert on Hang Meas HDTV
- 2014: K-POP Dream Concert on ETV Cambodia
- 2015: Coca-Cola Concert on MYTV
- 2016: Carabao Tour Concert on Hang Meas HDTV
- 2017: Phum Angkor Concert on Hang Meas HDTV

== TV Show ==
- Judge of "X factor Cambodia Season 1" 2019 with his co-worker at Hang Meas Production Aok Sokunkanha, Nop Bayyareth, Sok Seylalin
