= Cambodia's Got Talent season 1 =

Cambodia's Got Talent
- Season 1
- Hosted by: Nhem Sokun; Pen Chamrong
- Judges: Neay Koy; Preap Sovath; Khat Sokhim
- Winner: Yoeun Pisey

Release
- Original network: Hang Meas HDTV
- Original release: 30 November 2014 – 5 March 2015

Season one of the reality competition series Cambodia's Got Talent and started on 30 November 2014 and finished on 5 March 2015, it was host by Nhem Sokun and Per Chamrong and on the judging panel was Preap Sovath, Khat Sokhim and Neavy Koy. the golden buzzer was including in this series as it's been introduce in many other got talent shows in the Got Talent series as the act who revises the golden buzzer will be sent straight through to the live shows it can be only used by each judge only once. The season was won by 15-year-old blind singer Yoeun Pisey.

== Live Shows ==
The live shows began on 2 January 2015.

The judges can use their buzzers if they dislike an act. If three buzzers are used the act will be over but can still be voted.

Key	Buzzed	Advanced	Judges' Choice	Won Judges' Choice	Lost Judges' Choice

=== Live Shows Week 1 (January 2, 2015) ===
Act	Order	Performance description	Buzzes and judges vote			Result
Act	Order	Performance description	Koy	Sovath	Sokhim	Result
TTNJ	1	Dance Group				Eliminated
Chhorn Sovannara	2	Novelty				Eliminated
Pum Sreypich Dance Group	3	Traditional Dance Group				Eliminated
Ouch Sopheak	4	Drummer And Singer				Lost Judges Vote
Cam Sophoan	5	Singer				Eliminated
Nouy Ke	6	Michael Jackson impressionist				Eliminated
Keo Sarith & Ieng Sipho	7	Danger Act				Advanced
Eng Sovandara & Sat Oudom	8	Beatboxer And Singer				Won Judges Vote

=== Live Shows Week 2 (January 11, 2015) ===
Act	Order	Performance description	Buzzes and judges vote			Result
Act	Order	Performance description	Koy	Sovath	Sokhim	Result
Yat Bunthet	1	Singer				Eliminated
Koeung Narith	2	Squirt Milk Out Of Eyes				Eliminated
Horm Chanthoeun	3	Singer				Eliminated
Phorn Rattanak & Muth Borey	4	Dancers				Lost Judges Vote
Vong Vannak & Phon Chanpisey	5	Acrobat Dancers				Won Judges Vote
Sar Sophal	6	Shadow Act				Advanced
Hiek Nith	7	Singer				Eliminated
Sary Sopheap & Keo Pongnaro	8	Beatboxer And Singer				Eliminated

=== Live Shows Week 3 (January 16, 2015) ===
Act	Order	Performance description	Buzzes and judges vote			Result
Act	Order	Performance description	Koy	Sovath	Sokhim	Result
Sambath Rachana	1	Dancer				Eliminated
Leng Sovit	2	Speaker				Eliminated
Tao Nhim David	3	Singer				Eliminated
Van Chesda	4	Singer/Rapper				Won Judges Vote
Vat Chhay Kongkea & Seng Rattanak	5	Dancers				Wildcard
Nung Kanol	6	Opera Singer				Eliminated
Ek Samidi & Mak Samrith	7	Danger Act				Lost Judges Vote
Hey Thanrith and Chhun Marinet	8	Acting				Advanced

=== Live Shows Week 4 (January 23, 2015) ===
Act	Order	Performance description	Buzzes and judges vote			Result
Act	Order	Performance description	Koy	Sovath	Sokhim	Result
Yan David	1	Singer				Eliminated
Suon Borey	2	Drummer				Lost Judges Vote
Lim Chandara	3	Novelty Dancer				Eliminated
Chea Socheat	4	Singer				Won Judges Vote
Electric Boy	5	Robotic Dance Group				Eliminated
Miech Brother	6	Magician/Danger Act Group				Eliminated
Adam Mary	7	Singers/Dancers/Rappers Group				Eliminated
Hun Pen	8	Acrobats				Advanced

=== Live Shows Week 5 (January 30, 2015) ===
Act	Order	Performance description	Buzzes and judges vote			Result
Act	Order	Performance description	Koy	Sovath	Sokhim	Result
Piv Tha	1	Football Skill Act				Eliminated
Nan Samnak	2	Indian Dance				Eliminated
San Karim	3	Strong Act				Eliminated
Phal Sochea	4	Singer Impressionist				Eliminated
Samurai Top	5	Dance Group				Eliminated
Yoeun Pisey	6	15-year-old blind singer				Advanced
Yim Pisal	7	Acrobat				Won Judges Vote
Soeun Sreynet	8	Hula Hooper				Lost Judges Vote (Wildcard)

=== Live Shows Week 6 (February 6, 2015) ===
Act	Order	Performance description	Buzzes and judges vote			Result
Act	Order	Performance description	Koy	Sovath	Sokhim	Result
Loch Lychum	1	Dancer				Eliminated
Hardy Hood Band	2	Music Band				Eliminated
Kang Sopha	3	Singer				Eliminated
Hem Linda & Chhuon Vannath	4	Dancers				Eliminated
Teng Borith	5	Musician				Lost Judges Vote
Kong Sarun	6	Dancer				Eliminated
Reachsey Circus	7	Dance Group				Won Judges Vote
Prohm Sokrina	8	Dancer				Advanced

== Finale ==
Key	Winner	Runner-up

Act	Order	Performance description	Buzzes and judges vote			Result
Act	Order	Performance description	Koy	Sovath	Sokhim	Result
Chea Socheat	1	Singer				Eliminated
Van Chesda	2	Singer/Rapper				Eliminated
Vat Chhay Kongkea & Seng Rattanak	3	Dancers				Eliminated
Keo Sarith & Ieng Sipho	4	Danger Act				Eliminated
Yoeun Pisey	5	15-year-old blind singer				Winner
Prohm Sokrina	6	Dancer				Eliminated
Yim Pisal	7	Acrobat				Eliminated
Eng Sovandara & Sat Oudom	8	Beat boxer And Singer				Eliminated
Hun Pen	9	Acrobats				Runner's Up
Soeun Sreynet	10	Hula Hooper				Eliminated
Sar Sophal	11	Shadow Act				Eliminated
Reachsey Circus	12	Dance Group				Eliminated
Hey Thanrith and Chhun Marinet	13	Acting				Eliminated
Vong Vannak & Phon Chanpisey	14	Acrobats				Runner's Up
