= Ton Chanseyma =

Cambodian singer

- Born: 13 July 1999 (age 25); Takeo, Cambodia
- Genres: Pop, hip hop
- Years active: 2019–present
- Labels: Galaxy Navatra Production
- Website: navatra.com

Ton Chanseyma (Khmer: តន់ ចន្ទសីម៉ា; born 13 July 1999) is a Cambodian singer. She is known for her singles "Cambodian Pride", "Lambo Toy" and "Are You OK?", as well as for reaching the live shows of The Voice Cambodia as part of Aok Sokunkanha's team. With a strong following on social media, Ton often sees her latest TikToks rack up tens of thousands of views in a short time. Her content has more than 47 million total likes.

== Discography ==
- 2019: បើមិនស្មោះស្រឡាញ់គ្នារកងាប់អី
- 2019: យល់ច្រឡំថាគេស្រឡាញ់យើង
- 2019: គេនោះជាស្រីកាប់ដាវ
- 2019: ឡានសារ៉ែនអ
- 2020: បែកគ្នាព្រោះចិត្តឆេវឆាវ
- 2020: ក្រមុំឦសាន
- 2020: បងទុកអូនជាអាហារពេលព្រឹក
- 2020: មនុស្សអត់គ្នា
- 2020: ចេះយំនៅពេលស្គាល់បង
- 2020: ជាង៣០០ថ្ងៃ
- 2020: ស្មុគស្មាញ
- 2020: ដឹងប្រវត្តិបងច្បាស់ចេះតែចង់បែក
- 2020: ប្រុសល្អៗដាច់ស្តុកអស់ហើយ
- 2020: អារម្មណ៌ Sad
- 2020: OK, I Know
- 2021: Are You OK?
- 2021: Lambo Toy
- 2022: Cambodian Pride
- 2023: Sugar Mommy

== Tours ==
- 2019: Teen Zone Concert (Khmer: តំបន់យុវវ័យ)
- 2019: Water Music Concert (Khmer: តន្ត្រីលើទឹក)
- 2019: MYTV A1 Modern Concert (Khmer: តន្ត្រីសម័យទំនើបអេវ័ន)
- 2019: Ton Chanseyma Special Concert (Khmer: តន្ត្រីពិសេស)
- 2019: Ton Chanseyma Reborn (Khmer: ការប្រគំតន្រ្តីរីបន)
- 2020: Hang Meas Tour (Khmer: ការប្រគុំតន្ត្រីទេសចរណ៍ហង្សមាស)
