= Cambodia's Got Talent =

Cambodian televised talent competition

- Genre: Reality; Talent contest
- Created by: Sab Kduy
- Presented by: Nhem Sokun; Pen Chamrong; San Visal; Chheang Davuth; Sok Rasy
- Judges: Neay Koy; Khat Sokhim; Chea Vibol; Neay Krem
- Country of origin: Cambodia
- Original language: Khmer
- No. of seasons: 3

Production
- Running time: approx. 180 minutes

Original release
- Network: Hang Meas HDTV
- Release: 30 November 2014 – November 2023

Cambodia's Got Talent is a Cambodian televised talent competition, and is part of the global Got Talent franchise created by Simon Cowell. The program premiered on Hang Meas HDTV on 30 November 2014 and was presented by Nhem Sokun and Per Chamrong.

The program attracts a variety of participants, from across Cambodia, to take part and who possess some form of talent, with acts ranging from singing, dancing, comedy, magic, stunts, variety, and other genres. Each participant who auditions attempts to secure a place in the live episodes of a season by impressing a panel of judges - consisting of Neay Koy, Chea Vibol, Khat Sokhim, and Neay Krem. Those who make it into the live episodes compete against each other for both the judges' and the public's votes to reach the live final, where the winner receives a large cash prize.

== Format ==
=== Auditions ===
Each year's competition begins with a set of audition stages, the first of which is conducted by production teams across various cities in Cambodia. This stage is open to all forms of acts and judged by an independent group, and thus determines who will take part in the next stage of auditions titled "Judges' Auditions" - these are held in a public venue within select cities across the country and are attended by the judges handling that year's contest.

Each participant that reaches this stage of auditions is held offstage from the main performing area in a waiting room, and given a number that denotes when they will perform. Upon being called before the judges, the participant is given 90 seconds to demonstrate their act, with a live audience present for all performances. Each judge is given a buzzer, and may use it during a performance if they are unimpressed, hate what is being performed, or feel the act is a waste of their time; if a participant is buzzed by all judges, their performance is automatically over. At the end of a performance, the judges give constructive criticism and feedback about what they saw, whereupon they each give a vote - a participant requires a majority vote approving their performance to proceed to the next stage, otherwise they are eliminated from the program at that stage. Many acts that move on may be cut by producers and may be forced to forfeit their place due to the limited slots available for the next stage. Filming for each season always begins when the Judges' Auditions are taking place, with the show's presenter standing in the wings of each venue's stage to interview and give personal commentary on a participant's performance.

In addition, during the auditions, the "Golden Buzzer" is placed in the center of the judging panel. During auditions, each judge is allowed to use the Golden Buzzer to send an act automatically into the live shows, regardless of the opinion of the other judges; when it was initially used, the buzzer simply saved an act from elimination. The only rule to the buzzer was that a judge could use it only once per season.

=== Semi-finals and Final ===
Contestants who make it into the semi-finals by passing the auditions or receiving a Golden Buzzer are divided into groups for each round, where they must perform before the audience and judges, as well as on live television. As with the audition stage, each semi-finalist must conduct a performance before the judges – a new routine of their act – with the judges' role being to watch what is conducted and give feedback towards the end of the performance; buzzers may still be used by each judge, and the performance can be ultimately terminated if all buzzers are used. Because all semi-finalists are performing live, they are given time to prepare in advance with rehearsals, while production staff can assist those in preparing their performance – in the case of those conducting routines that incorporate a level of risk, production staff will ensure precautions are in place, including paramedics, and sometimes set up off-site venues for performances to use either live or for a pre-recorded film for the episode's live broadcast.

Each semi-final can only have two participants advance into the final, and these are determined by public vote – via a special SMS message, consisting of a two-digit number corresponding to each semi-finalist – that takes place once all semi-finalists have performed and during a break in the semi-final to allow for votes to be made. Once the voting period is ended and the results are counted and fully verified, the two semi-finalists with the highest total of votes secures their place in the final.

The finals operate similarly to the semi-finals, though all participants in this stage compete primarily to win votes from the public with a new routine; the judges can still buzz and give opinions on the performance they view but have little impact on the public's voting intention. Once the public vote has been completed, once all finalists have performed, and the votes verified and counted, the hosts announce who is placed as the top two acts of the vote, before revealing the winner who received the most votes from the public. Finalists who win receive a cash prize of ៛100 million (US$24,580).

== Season 1 ==
Season 1 aired from November 30, 2014, to March 5, 2015, and was hosted by Nhem Sokun and Per Chamrong. The judges were Neay Koy, Preap Sovath, and Khat Sokhim. The first season was won by 16-year-old blind singer Yoeun Pisey.

== Season 2 ==
Season 2 premiered in June 2018 and was hosted by Chea Vibol and San Visal. Neay Koy, Khat Sokhim, Preap Sovath remained as judges, and Neay Krem joined in as a fourth judge. The second season was won by the dance crew The King.

== Season 3 ==
Season 3 premiered on 26 August 2023 after a nearly five-year hiatus, and was presented by Chheang Davuth and Sok Rasy. Chea Vibol replaced Preap Sovath in the judging panel. The third season was won by MjM Dance Crew.

== Series summary ==
Season	Premiere date	Finale date	Winner	Presenters	Judges
1	30 November 2014	5 March 2015	Yoeun Pisey	Nhem Sokun; Per Chamrong	Neay Koy; Preap Sovath; Khat Sokhim
2	June 2018	November 2018	The King	Chea Vibol; San Visal	Neay Koy; Khat Sokhim; Preap Sovath; Neay Krem
3	26 August 2023	20 November 2023	MjM Dance Crew	Chheang Davuth; Sok Rasy	Chea Vibol; Khat Sokhim; Neay Krem; Neay Koy
