= G-Devith =

Cambodian singer and producer (born 1994)

G-Devith ជី ដេវីត
- Born: Ngoun Chan Devith; 5 October 1994 (age 31); Battambang Province, Cambodia
- Other name: Dit-Way
- Occupations: Singer; rapper; songwriter; record producer
- Years active: 2014–present
- Height: 188 cm (6 ft 2 in)
- Spouse: Tep Boprek
- Children: 1
- Musical career
- Origin: Phnom Penh, Cambodia
- Genres: Pop; hip hop
- Label: Rasmey Hang Meas Production (2014-2018) Dit-Way Nation (currently)

Ngoun Chan Devith (Khmer: ងួន ចាន់ ដេវីត; born 5 October 1994), known professionally as G-Devith (Khmer: ជី-ដេវីត) or Dit-Way (Khmer: ឌីតវ៉េ), is a Cambodian rapper, singer, songwriter, and record producer. He was previously a singer under Rasmey Hang Meas Production, but created his own label, Dit-Way Nation, in 2019. Devith began his career in 2014.

== Discography ==
=== Re-recorded albums ===
- LIVE FAST DIE YOUNG (2014)
- REBORN (2019)
- PASSION (2022)
- PASSION2THESKY 1 Dinosaur - EP (2023)
- B2B (2023)

== Performances ==
- 2014: Teen Zone Concert (Khmer: តំបន់យុវវ័យ)
- 2015: Water Music Concert (Khmer: តន្ត្រីលើទឹក)
- 2016: MYTV A1 Modern Concert (Khmer: តន្ត្រីសម័យទំនើបអេវ័ន)
- 2016: Special Concert (Khmer: តន្ត្រីពិសេស)
- 2014–present: Hang Meas Tour Concerts (Tour Concerts are available on special events)
- 2019: G-devith Reborn concert (Khmer: ការប្រគំតន្រ្តីរីបន)
- 2022: FFF PARTY (DOT CLUB)
- 2022: PASSION THE ALBUM CONCERT BY STING MUSICVERSE (ELLYSEE KOH PICH)
- 2023: PS2 X វ CONCERT
- 2023: FFF ASEAN PARTY 2023 (HOTEL CABODIANA) PHNOM PENH
