= Cover Version =

Compilation album by Steven Wilson
- Released: 30 June 2014
- Recorded: 2003–2010
- Genre: Pop rock, progressive rock
- Length: 55:13
- Label: Kscope
- Producer: Steven Wilson

Steven Wilson chronology
The Raven That Refused to Sing (And Other Stories) (2013)	Cover Version (2014)	Hand. Cannot. Erase. (2015)

Professional ratings
Review scores
Source	Rating
Allmusic	3.5/5 stars

Cover Version is a compilation album released in 2014 by British musician and record producer Steven Wilson. The album compiles the 12 songs originally released as six "2 song" singles. Every release was made up of one original song and one cover song that involved new interpretations of other artist's songs in ways much different from their original versions. The only exception to this format is in "The Unquiet Grave" which is actually an old English folk song, and not an original song written by Wilson.

== Track listing ==
No.	Title	Original artist	Length
1.	"Thank U"	Alanis Morissette	4:39
2.	"Moment I Lost"	Steven Wilson	3:12
3.	"The Day Before You Came"	ABBA	5:06
4.	"Please Come Home"	Steven Wilson	3:30
5.	"A Forest"	The Cure	6:04
6.	"Four Trees Down"	Steven Wilson	3:33
7.	"The Guitar Lesson"	Momus	4:03
8.	"The Unquiet Grave"	Traditional	6:57
9.	"Sign o' the Times"	Prince	3:55
10.	"Well You're Wrong"	Steven Wilson	3:35
11.	"Lord of the Reedy River"	Donovan	5:03
12.	"An End to End"	Steven Wilson	5:12

== Original release chart ==
Album	Release date	Label	Format	Covered Song	Original Song
Cover Version	March, 2003; June, 2005	Headphone Dust; Tonefloat	CD; 7" Single	"Thank U" by Alanis Morissette.	"Moment I Lost"
Cover Version II	October, 2004; June, 2005	Headphone Dust; Tonefloat	CD; 7" Single	"The Day Before You Came" by ABBA.	"Please Come Home"
Cover Version III	September, 2005; September, 2006	Headphone Dust; Tonefloat	CD; 7" Single	"A Forest" by The Cure.	"Four Trees Down"
Cover Version IV	July, 2006; September, 2006	Headphone Dust; Tonefloat	CD; 7" Single	"The Guitar Lesson" by Momus.	"The Unquiet Grave"
Cover Version V	July, 2008	Headphone Dust	CD; 7" Single	"Sign O' the Times" by Prince.	"Well You're Wrong"
Cover Version VI	February, 2010	Headphone Dust	CD; 7" Single	"Lord of the Reedy River" by Donovan.	"An End to End"
