= I Am a Singer Cambodia =

- Genre: Reality television
- Presented by: Chan Keonimol & Sun Visal
- Country of origin: Cambodia
- Original language: Khmer
- No. of seasons: 2
- No. of episodes: 1

Original release
- Network: Hang Meas HDTV
- Release: July 23, 2016 – present

I Am a Singer Cambodia is a Cambodian television singing competition program. It started its first season on July 23, 2016, on Hang Meas HDTV, with an advertised prize of 100 million Cambodian riel for the winner.

== Results ==
Safe	First	Bottom	Eliminated	Winner	Other Ranking	Withdrew

	Singer	Broadcast Date (2016)																	
	Singer	July 23	Jan 28		Feb 4	Feb 11		Feb 18	Feb 25		Mar 4	Mar 11		Mar 18	Mar 25		Apr 1	Sept 24	
	Singer	1st Round			2nd Round			3rd Round			4th Round			5th Round			Semifinal	Final Round	
	Singer	Qualifying	Knockout	Overall	Qualifying	Knockout	Overall	Qualifying	Knockout	Overall	Qualifying	Knockout	Overall	Qualifying	Knockout	Overall	Semifinal	1st Round	2nd Round
1	Doung Virakseth	—	—	—	1	1	1	1	1	1	1	1	1	1	—	—	—	—	1
2	Sous Visa	—	—	—	3	2	2	3	2	2	3	2	2	2	—	—	—	—	—
3	Youk Doungdara	—	—	—	—	—	—	2	3	3	2	4	3	3	—	—	—	—	—
4	Phorn Sreykhouch	—	—	—	2	4	3	4	5	4	5	3	4	4	—	—	—	—	—
5	Vy Dyneth	—	—	—	4	3	4	6	6	6	4	5	5	5	—	—	—	—	—
4	Arn Visal																		
3	Chhet Sovanpanha																		
2	Zono																		
1	Tep Boprek																		

== List of episodes ==
=== Season 1 ===
==== Episode 1 - Round 1 Week 1 ====
- Broadcast: July 23, 2016

Order of Performances	Singer	Song Title	Ranking
1	វី ឌីណែត-Vy Dyneth	ខ្យល់បក់ចូលភ្នែក	
2	ដួង វីរៈសិទ្ធ-Doung Virakseth	អូនគ្មានសិទ្ធទៅចោលបងទេ	
3	ទេព បូព្រឹក្ស-Tep Boprek	មិនជឿថាបងមិនស្រឡាញ់អូនទេ	
4	ឈិត សុវណ្ណបញ្ញា-Chhet Sovannpanha	ស្រក់ទឹកភ្នែកមិនមែនគ្មានបញ្ហា	
5	សួស វីហ្សា-Sous Visa	គេល្អប៉ុនណាទើបបងភ្លេចអូន	
6	ហ្សូណូ-Zono	My Love Don't Cry	
7	នៅ ស៊ីនឿន-Nov Sinoeun	១៧៥ថ្ងៃជាមួយការឈឺចាប់	

==== Episode 2 - Round 1 Week 2 ====
- Broadcast: July 30, 2016

Order of Performances	Singer	Song Title	Ranking
1	ឈិត សុវណ្ណបញ្ញា-Chhet Sovannpanha	យំកំដរភ្នែក	
2	សួស វីហ្សា-Sous Visa	អ្នកណាមិនស្នេហ៍បែរជាស្នេហ៍បង	
3	នៅ ស៊ីនឿន-Nov Sinoeun	ស្នេហ៍ខ្ញុំដូចរឿងនិទាន	
4	ហ្សូណូ-Zono	បងល្អគ្រប់យ៉ាងតែអូនស្រឡាញ់គេ	
5	វី ឌីណែត-Vy Dyneth	ស្រីល្ងង់ម្នាក់នេះស្អប់បងហើយ	
6	ទេព បូព្រឹក្ស-Tep Boprek	Right Here Waiting For You	
7	ដួង វីរៈសិទ្ធ-Doung Virakseth	បងក្រមិនសមគិតអនាគតអូន	

- Eliminated: Tep Boprek

==== Episode 3 - Round 2 Week 3 ====
- Broadcast: August 6, 2016

2nd round, Phorn Sreykhouch join the competitions, as the first singer to fill the seat, substitute Tep Boprek in 1st round is eliminated.

Order of Performances	Singer	Song Title	Ranking
1	ឈិត សុវណ្ណបញ្ញា-Chhet Sovannpanha	ស្រក់ទឹកភ្នែកពេលកំពុងញញឹម	5
2	ដួង វីរៈសិទ្ធ-Doung Virakseth	ប្រុសណាមិនយំ	1
3	ហ្សូណូ-Zono	នឹកមនុស្សម្នាក់ដែលមិនធ្លាប់ឈប់ស្រលាញ់ខ្ញុំ	6
4	សួស វីហ្សា-Sous Visa	ឆ្គួតព្រោះស្នេហ៍បង	3
5	វី ឌីណែត-Vy Dyneth	បងមានថ្មីអូនមានគេ	4
6	នៅ ស៊ីនឿន-Nov Sinoeun	មានចម្រៀងមួយណាឲ្យអូននឹកបង	7
7	ផន ស្រីខួច-Phorn Sreykhouch	អស្ចារ្យណាស់មែនទេ	2

==== Episode 4 - Round 2 Week 4 ====
- Broadcast: August 13, 2016

Order of Performances	Singer	Song Title	Ranking
1	ហ្សូណូ-Zono	នារីសក់ខ្លី	7
2	សួស វីហ្សា-Sous Visa	ចាំដប់ខែទៀតសិន	2
3	នៅ ស៊ីនឿន-Nov Sinoeun	សក់ខ្មៅរលោង	6
4	វី ឌីណែត-Vy Dyneth	ខ្ញុំមិនសុខចិត្តទេ	3
5	ផន ស្រីខួច-Phorn Sreykhouch	កុំមកញញឹមញញែម	4
6	ដួង វីរៈសិទ្ធ-Doung Virakseth	ស្រលាញ់បងចុះ	1
7	ឈិត សុវណ្ណបញ្ញា-Chhet Sovannpanha	ស្វារាំមុនឃីស	5

- Eliminated: Zono

==== Episode 5 - Round 3 Week 5 ====
- Broadcast: August 20, 2016

3rd round, Youk Doungdara join the competitions, as the second singer to fill the seat, substitute Zono in 2nd round is eliminated.

Order of Performances	Singer	Song Title	Ranking
1	សួស វីហ្សា-Sous Visa	ប្រទានស្នេហ៍	3
2	នៅ ស៊ីនឿន-Nov Sinoeun	រ៉ៃអើយ! រ៉ៃយំ	5
3	វី ឌីណែត-Vy Dyneth	នឹកម្ដាយស្រណោះប្តី	6
4	ផន ស្រីខួច-Phorn Sreykhouch	ទាវចូលម្លប់	4
5	ដួង វីរៈសិទ្ធ-Doung Virakseth	ចេញមកណាទាវ	1
6	ឈិត សុវណ្ណបញ្ញា-Chhet Sovannpanha	ភ័យអីម៉្លេះ	7
7	យក់ ដួងតារា-Youk Doungdara	ឆោមឆើត	2

==== Episode 6 - Round 3 Week 6 ====
- Broadcast: August 27, 2016

Order of Performances	Singer	Song Title	Ranking
1	យក់ ដួងតារា-Youk Doungdara	រំដួលដងស្ទឹងសៀមរាប	3
2	ដួង វីរៈសិទ្ធ-Doung Virakseth	សម្រស់បុប្ផាកំពង់ធំ	1
3	ផន ស្រីខួច-Phorn Sreykhouch	កំពង់សោមដែលខ្ញុំនឹក	5
4	សួស វីហ្សា-Sous Visa	កំរៀងស្នេហ៍ខ្ញុំ	2
5	វី ឌីណែត-Vy Dyneth	បណ្ដាំទន្លេបួនមុខ	6
6	នៅ ស៊ីនឿន-Nov Sinoeun	កុលាបបាត់ដំបង	4
7	ឈិត សុវណ្ណបញ្ញា-Chhet Sovannpanha	ដៃសមុទ្រត្រពាំងរូង	7

- Eliminated: Chhet Sovanpanha

==== Episode 7 - Round 4 Week 7 ====
- Broadcast: September 3, 2016

Arn Visal join the competitions, as the third singer to fill the seat, substitute Chhet Sovanpanha in 3rd round is eliminated.

Order of Performances	Singer	Song Title	Ranking
1	ផន ស្រីខួច-Phorn Sreykhouch	ស៊ូឃ្លាត	5
2	សួស វីហ្សា-Sous Visa	ស្មោះប៉ុណ្ណឹងមិនល្មម	3
3	វី ឌីណែត-Vy Dyneth	ក្បត់ហួសទៅហើយ	4
4	នៅ ស៊ីនឿន-Nov Sinoeun	នៅសុខៗមានអារម្មណ៍ចង់យំ	6
5	យក់ ដួងតារា-Youk Doungdara	វាលស្រែវាលស្រូវ	2
6	ដួង វីរៈសិទ្ធ-Doung Virakseth	ស្រលាញ់បងមិនស្ដាយក្រោយ	1
7	អាន វិសាល-Arn Visal	ទឹកភ្នែកខ្ទើយ	7

==== Episode 8 - Round 4 Week 8 ====
- Broadcast: September 10, 2016

Order of Performances	Singer	Song Title	Ranking
1	នៅ ស៊ីនឿន-Nov Sinoeun	កុលាបមួយទង	6
2	អាន វិសាល-Arn Visal	មហាស្រណោះ	7
3	វី ឌីណែត-Vy Dyneth	យក្សមេម៉ាយ	5
4	យក់ ដួងតារា-Youk Doungdara	យក្សចេញត្រួតកោះ	4
5	ផន ស្រីខួច-Phorn Sreykhouch	កម្សត់កាត់ព្រៃ	3
6	ដួង វីរៈសិទ្ធ-Doung Virakseth	ស្រណោះដីខ្មែរ	1
7	សួស វីហ្សា-Sous Visa	សម្រស់បុប្ផាព្រៃ	2

- Eliminated: Arn Visal

==== Episode 9 - Round 5 Week 9 ====
- Broadcast: September 17, 2016

Matin join the competitions, as the last singer to fill the seat, substitute Arn Visal in 4th round is eliminated.

Order of Performances	Singer	Song Title	Ranking
1	ផន ស្រីខួច-Phorn Sreykhouch	បើនាងបុកស្រូវ	4
2	យក់ ដួងតារា-Youk Doungdara	រាំវង់ឯករាជ្យជាតិ	3
3	ដួង វីរៈសិទ្ធ-Doung Virakseth	ឱ! ផ្ទៃស្រុកខ្មែរ	1
4	វី ឌីណែត-Vy Dyneth	សារិកាកែវអើយ	5
5	នៅ ស៊ីនឿន-Nov Sinoeun	ទូកត្នោត	6
6	សួស វីហ្សា-Sous Visa	ឱ! ផ្កាយលើមេឃ	2
7	ម៉ាទីន-Matin	កញ្ចាញ់ចេក	7

==== Episode 10 - Round 5 Week 10 ====
- Broadcast: September 24, 2016

Order of Performances	Singer	Song Title	Ranking
1	ដួង វីរៈសិទ្ធ-Doung Virakseth	សែនជូនដំណើរ	
2	នៅ ស៊ីនឿន-Nov Sinoeun	សកវាទិ៍ផ្កាម្រុំ	
3	សួស វីហ្សា-Sous Visa	វេចអន្សមភ្ជុំ	
4	ផន ស្រីខួច-Phorn Sreykhouch	មេឃរលំ	
5	យក់ ដួងតារា-Youk Doungdara	ទៅភ្ជុំវត្តណា ?	
6	ម៉ាទីន-Matin	ខ្យងក្កក់ទឹកជន់	
7	វី ឌីណែត-Vy Dyneth	ទេសភាពរដូវបុណ្យភ្ជុំ	

- Eliminated: Phorn Sreykhouch, Nov Sinoeun, Matin

==== Episode 11 - Semi-Final Week 11 ====
- Broadcast: October 1, 2016

Order of Performances	Singer	Song Title	Ranking
1	នៅ ស៊ីនឿន-Nov Sinoeun	ប្រាសាទព្រះវិហារ	
2	អាន វិសាល-Arn Visal	ចូលឆ្នាំចូលខែ	
3	ផន ស្រីខួច-Phorn Sreykhouch	បងស្រអែមស្រស់	
4	ម៉ាទីន-Matin	ម៉ាស្រុកក៏មានមួយ	
5	ទេព បូព្រឹក្ស-Tep Boprek	អត់ដឹងនិយាយថាម៉េច	
6	ហ្សូណូ-Zono	អ្នកស្រែអ្នកក្រុងផឹកស៊ីក្លែមខុសគ្នា	
7	ឈិត សុវណ្ណបញ្ញា-Chhet Sovanpanha	បងខ្មៅរើសប្រពន្ធ	

==== Episode 10 - Final Round 1 Week 12 ====
- Broadcast: September 24, 2016

Order of Performances	Singer	Song Title	Ranking
1	ផន ស្រីខួច-Phorn Sreykhouch	មួយលានបញ្ហា	
2	ដួង វីរៈសិទ្ធ-Doung Virakseth	យល់សប្តិឃើញពុក	
3	ឈិត សុវណ្ណបញ្ញា-Chhet Sovanpanha	សប្បាយចិត្តជាងគេបានកើតជាខ្មែរ	
4	សួស វីហ្សា-Sous Visa	ក្មេងក្បាលរឹង	
5	នៅ ស៊ីនឿន-Nov Sinoeun	អង្វរដួងចន្ទ	
6	យក់ ដួងតារា-Youk Doungdara	ស៊ីការទៀតហើយ	
7	វី ឌីណែត-Vy Dyneth	កំហឹង	

==== Episode 10 - Final Round 2 Week 13 ====
- Broadcast: September 24, 2016

Order of Performances	Singer	First Song	Second Song	Final Results
1	ផន ស្រីខួច-Phorn Sreykhouch	ព្រៃប្រសិទ្ធិ៍	ឲ្យបងសុំស្រឡាញ់ផង	—
2	យក់ ដួងតារា-Youk Doungdara	ផ្កាយស្នេហា	តាមបេះដូងដល់ទីបំផុត	—
3	វី ឌីណែត-Vy Dyneth	សែនស្រឡាញ់	តាំងយូស្នេហ៍	—
4	នៅ ស៊ីនឿន-Nov Sinoeun	កែវស្នេហា	ហួសពេលហើយអូន	—
5	សួស វីហ្សា-Sous Visa	ភ្នំពេញ	ជីវិតអ្នករត់ទូកដរ	—
6	ដួង វីរៈសិទ្ធ-Doung Virakseth	សក្រវាទិ៍	ស្នេហ៍ស្រីង៉ក់ងរ	Gold Medal
7	ឈិត សុវណ្ណបញ្ញា-Chhet Sovanpanha	ទីកែប	កាមទេពស្នេហ៍	—

== See also ==
- Hang Meas HDTV
