= Cambodian Idol =

- Genre: Reality Television
- Created by: Simon Fuller
- Presented by: Chea Vibol (Season1-5); Chan Keonimol (Season1-3); Thorn Leakhena (Seasons 4-5)
- Judges: Preap Sovath (Seasons 1-3); Aok Sokunkanha (Seasons 1-5); Nop Bayyareth (Seasons 1-5); Chhorn Sovannareach (Seasons 1-5); Sok Seylalin (Seasons 4-5)
- Country of origin: Cambodia
- Original language: Khmer
- No. of seasons: 5

Production
- Production company: Hang Meas

Original release
- Network: Hang Meas HDTV
- Release: July 12, 2015 – present

Related
- Idols (franchise)

Cambodian Idol is a Cambodian reality singing competition program. It premiered on July 12, 2015, on Hang Meas HDTV and was hosted by Chea Vibol and Chan Keonimol. The winner of the inaugural season was Ny Rathana. The second season concluded on Christmas Day 2016 and was won by Chhen Manich. In early 2018, Kry Thaipov won the final season of Cambodian Idol. The fourth season won by Lim Tichmeng in 2022.

== Format ==
The series consists of three phases:

- The Judges Auditions
- Theater Round 1
- Theater Round 2
- Green Miles
- Live Show

=== The Judges Auditions ===
All the contestants sing in front of the four judges and let the judges decide whether they can go to the next round or not. If they receive three or four "YES" from the judges, they can go to the next round. If they receive two, one, or no "YES", they cannot go through the next round. The winners of this round will receive a golden envelope which is to show that they are able to go to the next round.

=== Theater Round 1 ===
In this round, all the contestants find their own group in four or five and pick their song to sing in front of the judges. The judges then will decide who can go through the next round.

=== Theater Round 2 ===
The contestants are picked to sing a song in pair by the judges. The judges will decide who can go to the Green Miles.

=== Green Miles ===
More contestants have to be eliminated in this round. Contestants pick their song to sing and need to perform well in order to proceed to the Live Show. Only 12 contestants may continue onto the Live Show.

=== Live Show ===
Contestants have to perform live on stage with the presence of an audience. Live voting occurs each round, so as to decide who will be eliminated in that particular round. After weeks of elimination, the winner of Cambodian Idol will be chosen.

== Judges ==
All of the four judges are pop singers in Cambodia. They are Preap Sovath, Chhorn Sovannareach, Aok Sokunkanha, and Nop Bayyareth.

== Hosts ==
The first season of Cambodian Idol was presented by Chea Vibol who has worked for many years as a presenter on television shows. Chan Keonimol is a great presenter and has worked on many programs as a presenter.

== Season 1 & Finalists ==
| Key | Winner | Runner-Up | Eliminated Contestants | Songs that are performed by artists who are eliminated |

| Contestant | Live Show 1 | Live Show 2 | Live Show 3 | Live Show 4 | Live Show 5 | Live Show 6 | Live Show 7 | Semi-Final | Final |
|---|---|---|---|---|---|---|---|---|---|
| Ny Rathana | Yerng Nak Srer Trov Cher Nak Srer Douch Knea | Pi Mdong Pi | Sleuk Cher | Bet Tvea Bes Dong | Neang Ko Kor Knhom Srolanh | Phkar Mrom - Ro Dov Ben Pchum | Su Kleat - Knhom Kor Tlorb Mean Songsa Dae | Bong Pi Mun Chkout Bat Hery - Prot Chos - Neuk A Srolanh B | Somros Bopha Kampong Thom - Yu Vek Chun Koach Jet - Srolanh Oun Men Kvol Pi Arom Nek Dor Tey |
| Mao Hachi | Pu Moto Dub | Boak | Battambang Bondol Chet | Teuk Pnek Chonous Vea Cha | Lok Sre Chol Bar | Sombour Meas - Kathen Wat Yerng | Bdey Men Ban Kar - Chob Call Na Tlai | Ku Sneh Ku Chomreang Chreang Bat Ku - Kech Norouk - Call Tune Chlorng Chlery | Romdoul Steung Sangker - Cheur Chab Bon Tic Mdong - Mak Sin Neary Tmey |
| Sao Oudom | Yab Nis Yab | Srolanh Srey Doung | Knhom Srolanh Srey Touch | Lea Srey Chet Pi | Cheang Kat Sok Dai Aek | Sen Sronos - Kathen Wat Yerng | Chkout Chet Prous Srolanh Oun - Chis Dom Rei Tam Rok Srey Kmov | Dak Tean Chet Smos - My Love Don't Cry - Pisoath Sneh Breh Cheu Chab | Bopha Svay Reang - Rom Chongvak Rock and Roll - Dol Velea Bek Terb Deng Ta Bong Men Sak Som |
| Sovathdy Thearika | Rous Rer Besdong | Vern Ta Kmov Arv Sbek | Yob Nis Hert Avei Knhom Prouy | Derm Bey Nak Mday | Smarn Tae Sros Hery Neng | Tes Pheap Nea Rodov Pchum - Rodov Ben Pchum | Ro Seal Tngai Chre - Deb Deb Ouy | Nov Sok Sok Mean Ah Rom Chong Yom - Pleang - Chob Douy Kmean Vea Ja | |
| Eam Vanny | Louk Kro Bei Prous Mae | Cham Bong Mean Sen | Pkar Rik Knong Chet | Veal Sre Veal Srov | Kolab Meas Bong | Oun Tov Pchum Wat Na - Til Moung | Prous Oun Terb Bong Kmean Songsa - Dom Rei Tnorm Sneh | | |
| Meas Monyreach | Srok Krouch Chmar Sneha Knhom | Mean Tmey Mdech Men Brab | Tngai Saek Bong Lea | Rong Ka Kmean Kon Kromom | Sronos Pkar Ktum | Kom Plech Preh Rous - Til Moung | | | |
| Sun Chanthorn | Neuk | Boak Kon Chrouk Tov Leng Srok | Pkar Rik Ler Mek | Srey Na Men Yom | Chom No Pailin | | | | |
| Soeum Samnith | Som Chet Som Sneh | Bak Chun Tol | Kheng Prous Srolanh | Mern Pon Soniya | | | | | |
| Kouy Ratin | Chorb Bak Dub Chob Sneh | Sok Sok Mok Sneh Bong | Phnom Bros Phnom Srey | | | | | | |
| Yong Nita | Kon Brosa Tver Srer Mae Men Penh Chet | Kom Barom Tha Oun Men Smos | Tom Mun Srokeal | | | | | | |
| Eng Tongleng | Rhythm of the Rain | Mlob Tnoat Rom Noy | | | | | | | |
| Lonn Sobinn | Ontong Sneh | | | | | | | | |

== Season 2 & Finalists ==
| Key | Winner | Runner-Up | Eliminated Contestants | Songs that are performed by artists who are eliminated |

| Contestant | Live Show 1 | Live Show 2 | Live Show 3 | Live Show 4 | Live Show 5 | Live Show 6 | Live Show 7 | Semi-Final | Final |
|---|---|---|---|---|---|---|---|---|---|
| Chhen Manich (ឈិន ម៉ានិច្ច) | Besdong 100 (បេះដូង ១០០) | Spean Kompong Loung (ស្ពានកំពង់ហ្លួង) | Pleang Thlak Knong Besdong (ភ្លៀងធ្លាក់ក្នុងបេះដូង) | Dan Cherng Krobey (ដានជើងក្របី) | Bak Omnout (បាក់អំនួត) | Sen Alai (សែនអាល័យ) | Penh Chet Tae Bong Mouy (ពេញចិត្តតែបងមួយ) - Oy Tae Ban (អោយតែបាន) | Chop (ឈប់) - Borey Chou Long (បុរីជូឡុង) | Chheu Chab Mouy Lean Dong (ឈឺចាប់មួយលានដង) - Chot May Machareach (ចុតម្មាយមជ្ឈរាជ) - Serch Sol (សើចសល់) |
| Hin Lida (ហ៊ិន លីដា) | I Have Nothing | Besdong Komprea (បេះដូងកំព្រា) | Bong Srolanh Ke Oy Slab Jos (បងស្រឡាញ់គេអោយស្លាប់ចុះ) | Kon Brosa Tver Srae Mae Min Penh Chet (កូនប្រសារធ្វើស្រែម៉ែមិនពេញចិត្ត) | Kom Leng Dai Thngon (កុំលេងដៃធ្ងន់) | Terk Ho (ទឹកហូរ) | Chnam Oun 16 (ឆ្នាំអូន១៦) - Trocheak Chet (ត្រជាក់ចិត្ត) | Arom Pel Klas (អារម្មណ៌ពេលខ្លះ) - Phnom Neang Kongrey (ភ្នំនាងកង្រី) | Boy - Nerk Phum Phnom Thom (នឹកភូមិភ្នំធំ) - Watch Me Shine |
| Noun Sothearak (នួន សុធារ័ក្ស) | I Who Have Nothing | Somros Neang Chaev Tuk (សម្រស់នាងចែវទូក) | Vik Pak De Sarey (វិប្បដិសារី) | Ma Orm Srae (ម្អមស្រែ) | Lerng Rorm Chong Vak Thmey (ឡើងរាំចង្វាក់ថ្មី) | Chom Nes Jis Kor Aeng (ចំណេះជិះកឯង) | Rorm Chongvak Mon Kis (រាំចង្វាក់ Mon Kis) - Min Del Khernh Sos (មិនដែលឃើញសស់) | Baby I'm Sorry - Romdoul Posat (រំដួលពោធ៌សាត់) | Toch Chet (តូចចិត្ត) - Pel Del Trov Yum (ពេលដែលត្រូវយំ) - Chongvak Nis Rorm Sabay (ចង្វាក់នេះរាំសប្បាយ) |
