= Chhorn Sovannareach =

Cambodian singer-songwriter

- Born: 10 October 1985 (age 39); Kampong Speu, Kampuchea
- Origin: Cambodia
- Genres: Pop, traditional Khmer song, blues
- Occupation(s): Singer-songwriter, actor
- Years active: 2005–present
- Labels: U2 Production (2005) Chenla Brothers Production (2005–2007) Rasmey Hang Meas Production (2007–present)

Chhorn Sovannareach (Khmer: ឆន សុវណ្ណារាជ; born 10 October 1985), simply known as Reach, is a Cambodian singer-songwriter. He began his singing career in the mid-2000s under three different record labels and is also an actor, brand ambassador and prominent celebrity in Cambodia with over 595,000 Instagram followers.

== Discography ==
=== Solo albums ===
Year	Single
2005	បើអូនប្រែផ្សេង
2005	ពេលណាអូនស្មោះ
2006	សប្បាយចិត្តទេអូន
2007	ចាំទាំងត្រដរ
2007	ទីក្រុងគ្មានមេឃ
2008	អង្វរព្រះ
2009	គង់មានថ្ងៃអូនដឹងខ្លួន
2015	ស្រលាញ់ខ្លួនឯងម្តងពេលអូនស្រលាញ់គេ
2016	ខ្ញុំមិនល្ងង់ទេ
2017	សុំទោសដែលទុកអូនចោល

== Filmography ==
=== Television series ===
Year	Title	Role	Network	Remarks
2017	Autumn in My Heart (សិសិររដូវក្នុងបេះដូង)	Chetra	Hang Meas HDTV	Remake of Korean drama of the same title
2021	ខ្ញុំមានញាណលើស		Hang Meas HDTV	

== TV Show ==
Year	Title	Role	Season	
2014	The Voice Cambodia	Coach	1	
2015	Cambodia Idol	Judge	1	
2016	The Voice Cambodia	Coach	2	
2016	Cambodia Idol	Judge	2	
2017	Cambodia Idol	Judge	Judge	3
2019	Cambodia Idol Junior	Judge	Judge	1
2020	Cambodia Idol Junior	Judge	Judge	2
2023	The Voice Cambodia	Coach	3	
