= Aok Sokunkanha =

Cambodian singer

Aok Sokunkanha ឱក សុគន្ធកញ្ញា
- Born: 14 September 1987 (age 38); Phnom Penh, Cambodia
- Origin: Cambodia
- Genres: Pop, traditional Khmer music, blues
- Occupations: Singer, actress, brand ambassador
- Years active: 1999–present
- Labels: Rasmey Stung Sangkae (1999–2005); U2 Entertainment (2006–2007); Rock Music Production (2008); Rasmey Hang Meas (2008–present)

Aok Sokunkanha (Khmer: ឱក សុគន្ធកញ្ញា; born 14 September 1987), simply known as Kanha, is a Cambodian singer, actress and brand ambassador. She is known for being a judge in the reality shows The Voice Cambodia, Cambodian Idol, The Voice Kids Cambodia and The X Factor Cambodia.

== Early life ==
Aok Sokunkanha was born on 14 September 1987 in Chamkarmon District, Phnom Penh. Her father, Aok Boni, was a musician, and her mother, In Sokun, was a teacher and dance instructor at the Royal University of Fine Arts. She is the eldest among three children. After graduating from high school, she also went on to study art at the Royal School of Fine Arts. Sokunkanha started to have a passion for arts at the age of 10. At first, her father never knew she could sing, so one day he was surprised to hear his daughter sang so he got off the wall while teaching other students to sing. From then on, her father would take her with him every time he performed. Her father wrote a song for a dance performance wishing her a happy day in the absence of his band singer. Sokunkanha also had the opportunity to sing in the performance. She and her mother often went to Eav Vathana's house to sing karaoke. Eav Vathana, who later became the producer of Rasmey Stoeng Sangke Production, at that time, Sokunkanha entered the art field during 1999. She joined the first song that was produced by the production.

== Career ==
=== 1999–2005: Start of music career in (RSK) Production ===
Aok Sokunkanha first entered the art world in 1999. The production that she first sang was Steong Sangke Production, which during the years (1999–2004), Reaksmey Steong Sangke Production did not have many songs for her. In 2005, RSK started releasing many songs for her to sing, which included a song that made Sokunkanha began to get noticed and known: (Where Did You Get My Number) RSK Vol.25 2005 And later in 2005, Reaksmey Steong Sangke Production announced its closure. Sokun Kanha also went out to sing at U2 Entertainment Club at night. Started a career at U2 Entertainment Club was led her to know the new production, U2 Entertainment Production in 2006.

=== 2006–2007: U2 Entertainment Production ===
In 2006, Sokunkanha released a series of songs for U2 Production, but did not receive any support. That year, she had many song competitions in various productions. In 2007, Sokunkanha released a joint album with members of U2 production, including Mr. Khemarak Sereymun, whose song seems to have received a lot of support from young people, which made her very popular in the song "Mae tha" U2 Vol.17 2007 This song is a cover version from the Thai Band Bazoo. In the same year 2007, U2 Entertainment Production announced the closure due to lack of sufficient support, and when Sokunkanha went to Rock Music Production in 2008.

=== 2008: Rock Music Production ===
In 2008, Sokunkanha provided a song for the CTN series Snam Sneh Samuth Ream. That same year, Rock Music Production released her song "Khmer National Pride" which was well received by the public. At the end of 2008, Sokunkanha left Rock Production to join Rasmey Hangmeas Production.

== Brand Ambassador ==
=== 2020–present: Chip Mong Land and Chip Mong Bank ===
In 2020, Aok Sokunkanha signed agreements and has officially become the brand ambassador with Chip Mong Land and Chip Mong Bank, Cambodia.

== Achievements ==
=== Awards and recognition ===
Year	Nominated work	Category	Award	Result	Notes	Ref.
2010	Top 1 Music Show	imuzik A Award of Music	Nominated	Metfone imuzik Concert		
2012	Top1 Singer Music Billboards	Top10 Music Billboards By Cool FM	Nominated	Cool FM Cambodia		
2018	Best Female Artist of The Year	NRG Music Award	Won	NRG 89FM Cambodia		

== Discography ==
Album name	Artist	Released	Label
Where Did You Get My Number	ASK	2005	RSK Production
Snam Sne Samuth Ream	ASK	2006	U2 Production
Khmer National Pride	Rock Zone	2008	Rock Production

== Live performances ==
- Best of the Best: Live Concert is a concert performed annually
- Hang Meas Music Top Show: Live Concert
- The Voice Cambodia Tour Concert 2014
- Cambodian's Idol Tour Concert 2015
- Solo Tour Concert

== Filmography ==
=== Film ===
- Kmouch Pchea Bat: Supporting role
- Pdey Laor: Lead role
- Coffee Shop Girl – The Star: Main role
- Momeach Proleng Plarng: Supporting role

=== TV shows ===
- 2014: Judge, The Voice Cambodia Season 1
- 2015: Judge, Cambodian Idol Season 1
- 2016: Coach, Cambodian Idol Season 2
- 2016: Coach, The Voice Cambodia Season 2
- 2017: Coach, The Voice Kid Cambodia Season 1
- 2017: Judge, Cambodian Idol Season 3
- 2018: Coach, The Voice Kid Cambodia Season 2
- 2019: Judge, The X Factor Cambodia Season 1
