= Preap Sovath =

Cambodian singer and actor

Oknha Preap Sovath
- ព្រាប សុវត្ថិ
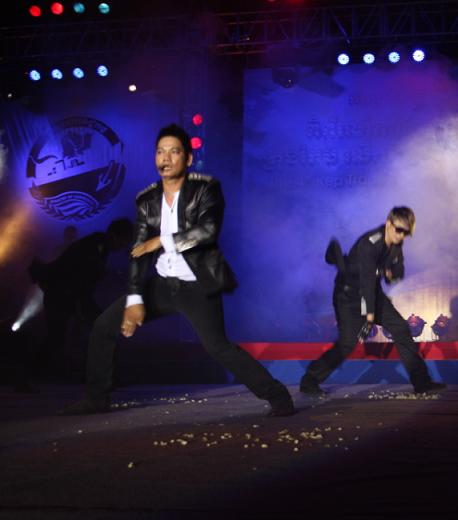
- Sovath (front) in 2011
- Born: 25 January 1975 (age 51); Khmer Republic
- Occupations: Singer; actor; brand ambassador
- Years active: 1995–present
- Spouse: Long Sreymom (m. 1997)
- Children: 3, including N'John
- Musical career
- Genre: Pop
- Instrument: Vocals
- Labels: Rasmey Hang Meas (1997–2020); Galaxy Navatra (2020–present)

Preap Sovath (Khmer: ព្រាប សុវត្ថិ [priəp so.ˈʋat]; born 25 January 1975) is a Cambodian singer, actor and brand ambassador. He began his singing career in the early 1990s. He also appeared in Cambodian movies such as The Crocodile. He was also an audition judge for the first season of Cambodian Idol, first season of Cambodia's Got Talent, as well as The Voice Kid Cambodia. In 2022, he received the royal title of Oknha.

== Career ==
Oknha Preap Sovath's career as a singer started in the 1990s when he joined the army and became a political commissar. He worked during the daytime and sang at restaurants or bars at nighttime. He sang with Touch Sunnix for a year, from 1995 to 1996, and released his first song.

He represented Cambodia in the 2014 World Music Awards and was nominated.

Contracting with Rasmey Hang Meas Production since 1994, Oknha Preap Sovath joined Galaxy Navatra in 2020 with the hope to promote Khmer Music and artists to the international stage.

== Performances ==
Oknha Preap Sovath took part in the MTV EXIT Concert in Phnom Penh on December 12, 2008. The concert was part of a campaign to raise awareness to end exploitation and human trafficking in Asia.

Oknha Preap Sovath has performed at the Best of the Best: Live Concert, a concert which has taken place annually since 2004 at Phnom Penh Olympic Stadium and has included performances by Cambodian singers from Raksmey Hang Meas and more. The concert is free to the public; DVD sales cover the costs. He also performed at Best of the Best 2012 on February 14, 2012 at Koh Pich's Concert Hall.

Oknha Preap Sovath has also been involved in many international concerts such as:

- Japan Music Festival – 2003
- Thai-Cambodian Friendship Concert 2010
- Japan ASEAN Music Festival for Healing 2013

== Achievements ==
Year	Category	Institution or publication	Result	Notes	Ref.
2007	Cambodia Best Actor	Top Honor at Cambodian Film	Won	The Crocodile (IMDb-2005)	
2012	Cambodia Top Singer Award	Anachak Dara	Won	Sabay Company	
2013	Best Male Singer Award	Anachak Dara	Won	Sabay Company	
2014	Representation of Cambodia	World Music Awards	Nominated	Monte Carlo Monaco 2014	

Logo Brand	Brand Name	Brand Ambassador Institution	Year
	Isuzu	Isuzu-Cambodia	2019
	Vivo	Vivo Mobile-Cambodia	2019

== Discography ==
Album name	Released	Label
Beam Preah Mok Sbot Kor Min Jer	2002	Rasmey Hang Meas VCD Vol.56
Sexy Lady	2002	Rasmey Hang Meas VCD Vol.59
Rodern Mean Sneh	2004	Rasmey Hang Meas VCD Karaoke Vol.85
U Better Not Come Home	2005	Rasmey Hang Meas CD Vol.255
So Cool-So Hot	2005	Rasmey Hang Meas CD Vol.276
Last Year	2007	Rasmey Hang Meas CD Vol.324
My Sexy Lady	2018	Rasmey Hang Meas CD Vol.603

=== Solo albums ===
Album name	Released	Label
Soft Rock	2002	Rasmey Hang Meas VCD Vol.55
Koa Tnei Pram	2003	Rasmey Hang Meas VCD Karaoke Vol.44
Slight Pain	2004	Rasmey Hang Meas VCD Karaoke Vol.87
Preap Sovath Noodle	2006	Rasmey Hang Meas CD Vol.268
Real Rock	2006	Rasmey Hang Meas CD Vol.316
Early Morning	2007	Rasmey Hang Meas CD Vol.331
Lady	2016	Rasmey Hang Meas CD Vol.530
Ah Neth Meas Bong	2016	Rasmey Hang Meas CD Vol.545

=== Compilation albums ===
Album name	Released	Label
Better Day	2004	Rasmey Hang Meas VCD Karaoke Vol.53
Cham Bong Mean Sen	2004	Rasmey Hang Meas VCD Karaoke Vol.86
Chet Prey Psai	2004	Rasmey Hang Meas VCD Karaoke Vol.90
Style Snae	2005	Rasmey Hang Meas VCD Vol.69

== Filmography ==
- 2005: The Crocodile ("នេសាទក្រពើ")
- 2013: Have You Ever Loved Me? ("ធ្លាប់ស្រលាញ់ខ្ញុំទេ?")
