= Hang Meas HDTV =

- Country: Cambodia
- Broadcast area: Cambodia (Isan and ) Laos (southern portion); Vietnam (Central Highlands, Southeast and Mekong Delta)
- Headquarters: No. 134 E0, St. 182, Sk. Boeng Prolit, Kh. Prampir Meakkakra, Phnom Penh, Cambodia

Programming
- Picture format: HDTV

Ownership
- Owner: Rasmey Hang Meas Video Production
- Sister channels: Rasmey Hang Meas HDTV

History
- Launched: 2012; 14 years ago

Hang Meas HDTV (Khmer: ហង្សមាស HDTV) is a TV channel in Cambodia. Hang Meas HDTV is part of Rasmey Hang Meas Video Group Production, a media conglomerate entertainment company in Cambodia. It claims to own approximately 70% of Cambodia's entertainment industry, with a range of media platforms counting video and music video productions, radio stations, and TV stations covering news, sport, and entertainment.

Although privately owned, Hang Meas TC is controlled indirectly by the ruling Cambodian People's Party (CPP).

The TV channel began broadcasting in 2012 and became the first channel in the country to broadcast in high-definition. The TV channel also exclusively owns licenses to produce the format shows such as The Voice Cambodia, Cambodian Idol, X Factor Cambodia, and Cambodia's Got Talent, The Voice Kids Cambodia, Cambodian Idol Junior, Killer Karaoke Cambodia, The Mask Singer Cambodia, and I Am a Singer Cambodia. It also produces Khmer drama series, leading local news and big tour concerts for many brands in Cambodia.

== Programming ==
News

- Hang Meas Morning Express News (Khmer: ហង្សមាសព័ត៌មានពេលព្រឹក) - live every Monday to Friday
- Hang Meas Flash News - live every Monday to Friday
- Hang Meas Updates Today - live every Monday to Friday

International reality/game shows

- The Voice Cambodia - completed 4 seasons
- X Factor Cambodia - completed 2 seasons
- The Voice Kids Cambodia - completed 3 seasons
- Cambodian Idol - completed 5 seasons
- Cambodia's Got Talent - completed 3 seasons
- I am a Singer Cambodia - completed 2 seasons
- Killer Karaoke Cambodia - completed 8 seasons
- 200 Million Money Drop - completed 2 seasons
- I Can See Your Voice Cambodia - completed 3 seasons
- The Mask Singer Cambodia - completed 2 seasons
- Don't Lose the Money Cambodia - completed 1 season
- Cambodian Idol Junior - completed 2 seasons
- Beat The Best - completed 2 seasons
- Duet Song Festival Cambodia - completed 1 season
- The Amazing Star - completed 1 season
- Iron Chef - season 1

Upcoming shows

- Got To Dance Cambodia
- Star King Cambodia

Concert

The channel broadcasts concerts every weekend.

- Special Concert (Khmer: តន្ត្រីពិសេស)
- Branding Concert in Studio:
  - Ganzberg Uber Concert
  - Cambodia Brew The Beat Concert
  - Boostrong Concert 2021
  - Freshy Hero Kids Concert
  - M150 extra Concert
  - Oishi Greentea Concert
- Hang Meas Tour Concerts at provinces (Tour concerts are available on special events.)

Khmer drama

- Hang Meas Khmer Drama broadcasting on Hang Meas HDTV every Monday - Wednesday at 19:00-20:00 and 20:00-21:00
- Completed Drama:
  - សិសិរដូវក្នុងបេះដូង (Autumn In My Heart)
  - បិសាចគួរឲ្យស្រលាញ់ (My Little Devil)
  - ផ្កាថ្ម
  - កូនពស់កេងកង (Pous Keng Kang)
  - រាជនីភូមិគ្រឹះ
  - កូនប្រសារអ្នកមាន
  - រាជបុត្រកង្កែប (The Frog Prince)
  - តាមដាន (Music Series)
  - សង្សារមួយខែពីរខែ (Music Series)
  - ប្រពន្ធបងមិនល្អមែនទេ (Music Series)
  - ប្រពន្ធ (Wife)
  - ម៉ែក្មេកចេញពីក្នុងព្រះចន្ទ
  - ឋានសួគ៌ទារុណ
  - អ្នកម៉ាក់គ្មានកូន
  - ខ្ញុំមានញាណលើស (I Have A Plus Sense)
  - សុំទោសមួយលានដង (Music Series)
  - បើមេឃគ្មានផ្កាយ
  - ម្តាយពីរ (Two Mothers)
  - កញ្ញាមុខឈើ (My Office Mate)
  - សុំទោសលាហើយស្នេហា

Sports

- King Of Fighter
- Xtreme Kun Khmer
- CAMBODIA កំពូលអ្នកចម្បាំង គុនខ្មែរ
- Empire Gen Z Kun Khmer
- Bundesliga
- Olympic Games (licensed to LIVE Olympic Summer 2021 in Cambodia)
- 32nd Southeast Asian Games 2023
- 2026 FIFA World Cup (licensed to LIVE FIFA World Cup 2026™ in Cambodia)

Foreign drama

- Naagin (Khmer: ប្រពន្ធពស់)
- Korean dramas

Animation series

- Regal Academy
- Winx Club
- Mia and Me

More

- Wipeout (Khmer: ល្បែងមួយលានឧបសគ្គ)
- Ultimate Fighting Championship

== Availability ==
Hang Meas HDTV is available and the transmitter location is Tiger Beer Road in Phnom Penh, Cambodia.

== See also ==
- The Voice Cambodia
- Cambodian Idol
