= List of I Can See Your Voice Cambodia episodes =

Television game show episode list

About the series
- I Can See Your Voice Cambodia is a Cambodian television mystery music game show broadcast by Hang Meas HDTV, featuring its format based on the South Korean programme of the same title.
- More about the series

Episodes overview
- Total episode(s): 56
- Aired episode(s): 54
- Special episode(s): 2

The Cambodian television mystery music game show I Can See Your Voice Cambodia has played a total of four seasons and 56 episodes; broadcasting on Hang Meas HDTV with its first run from 10 February 2019 to 22 July 2022, and a second since 25 September 2026.

== Series overview ==
| Series | Episodes | Originally released | | Good singers | Bad singers |
| Series | Episodes | First released | Last released | Good singers | Bad singers |
|---|---|---|---|---|---|
| 1 | 15 | 10 February 2019 | 19 May 2019 | 10 | 5 |
| 2 | 15 | 5 April 2020 | 12 June 2020 | 15 | 0 |
| 3 | 15 | 1 April 2022 (Note: The 3rd season began airing on this date, earlier than its initially scheduled fourth quarter of 2023.) | 22 July 2022 | 12 | 3 |
| 4 | 9 | 25 September 2026 | present | 7 | 2 |
| Sp | 2 | 30 June 2019 | 15 August 2020 | —N/a | —N/a |

== Episodes ==
=== Season 1 (2019) ===
List of season 1 episodes
| No. overall | No. in season | Guest artist(s) | Player order (Note: It refers to the guest artist(s) that have played in according to their first game; returning guest artists (which also include foreigners or former good singers, with their names displaying in italics) are not counted.) | Original release date |
|---|---|---|---|---|
| 1 | 1 | Pich Sophea | 1 | 10 February 2019 |
| 2 | 2 | Nop Bayyareth | 2 | 17 February 2019 |
| 3 | 3 | Sokun Nisa | 3 | 24 February 2019 |
| 4 | 4 | Zono | 4 | 3 March 2019 |
| 5 | 5 | Reth Suzana | 5 | 10 March 2019 |
| 6 | 6 | Step | 6 | 17 March 2019 |
| 7 | 7 | Sok Sreyneang | 7 | 24 March 2019 |
| 8 | 8 | Chhorn Sovannareach | 8 | 31 March 2019 |
| 9 | 9 | Tep Boprek | 9 | 7 April 2019 |
| 10 | 10 | Khan Makara | 10 | 14 April 2019 |
| 11 | 11 | Vy Dyneth | 11 | 21 April 2019 |
| 12 | 12 | Ek Siday | 12 | 28 April 2019 |
| 13 | 13 | Ny Ratanna | 13 | 5 May 2019 |
| 14 | 14 | Chheng Mearnich | 14 | 12 May 2019 |
| 15 | 15 | Hour Lavy | 15 | 19 May 2019 |

=== Season 2 (2020) ===
List of season 2 episodes
| No. overall | No. in season | Guest artist(s) | Player order | Original release date |
|---|---|---|---|---|
| 1 | 1 | En Sereyvong | 16 | 5 April 2020 |
| 2 | 2 | Sim Thaina | 17 | 12 April 2020 |
| 3 | 3 | Chhom Chhorvin | 18 | 19 April 2020 |
| 4 | 4 | Sok Mearch | 19 | 26 April 2020 |
| 5 | 5 | Oeun Sreymom | 20 | 3 May 2020 |
| 6 | 6 | Leng Bunna | 21 | 10 May 2020 |
| 7 | 7 | Chann Samphors | 22 | 17 May 2020 |
| 8 | 8 | Pich Ponleu | 23 | 24 May 2020 |
| 9 | 9 | Sopheak Kosoma | 24 | 31 May 2020 |
| 10 | 10 | Noy Vanneth | 25 | 7 June 2020 |
| 11 | 11 | Chum Lino | 26 | 14 June 2020 |
| 12 | 12 | Chamroeun Sopheak | 27 | 21 June 2020 |
| 13 | 13 | Nov Sinoern | 28 | 28 June 2020 |
| 14 | 14 | Chhuon Sovannchhai | 29 | 5 July 2020 |
| 15 | 15 | Yem Samonn | 30 | 12 July 2020 |

=== Season 3 (2022) ===
List of season 3 episodes
| No. overall | No. in season | Guest artist(s) | Player order | Original release date |
|---|---|---|---|---|
| 31 | 1 | Sok Pisey | 31 | 1 April 2022 |
| 32 | 2 | Khan James | 32 | 10 April 2022 |
| 33 | 3 | Sokun Nisa | — | 17 April 2022 |
| 34 | 4 | Pich Sophea | — | 24 April 2022 |
| 35 | 5 | Thy Chanthea | 33 | 8 May 2022 |
| 36 | 6 | Ny Ratanna | — | 20 May 2022 |
| 37 | 7 | Vy Dyneth | — | 27 May 2022 |
| 38 | 8 | Chhorn Sovannareach | — | 3 June 2022 |
| 39 | 9 | Sok Seylalin | 34 | 10 June 2022 |
| 40 | 10 | Nop Bayyareth | — | 17 June 2022 |
| 41 | 11 | Zono | — | 24 June 2022 |
| 42 | 12 | Sopheak Kosoma | — | 1 July 2022 |
| 43 | 13 | Ann Visal | 35 | 8 July 2022 |
| 44 | 14 | Chhin Ratanak | 36 | 15 July 2022 |
| 45 | 15 | Tel Thai | 37 | 22 July 2022 |

=== Season 4 (2026) ===
List of season 4 episodes
| No. overall | No. in season | Guest artist(s) | Player order | Original release date |
|---|---|---|---|---|
| 46 | 1 | Sok Seylalin | — | 25 September 2026 |
| 47 | 2 | Nop Bayyareth | — | 2 October 2026 |
| 48 | 3 | Suos Viza | 38 | 9 October 2026 |
| 49 | 4 | Vong Dara Ratana | 39 | 16 October 2026 |
| 50 | 5 | Phorn Sreykhouch | 40 | 23 October 2026 |
| 51 | 6 | Pich Sophea | — | 30 October 2026 |
| 52 | 7 | Kong Chamroeun | 41 | 6 November 2026 |
| 53 | 8 | Chamroeun Sopheak | — | 13 November 2026 |
| 54 | 9 | Lim Tichmeng | 42 | 20 November 2026 |
| 55 | 10 | TBA | TBA | 27 November 2026 |
| 56 | 11 | TBA | TBA | 4 December 2026 |
| 57 | 12 | TBA | TBA | 11 December 2026 |

== Specials ==
List of special episodes
| No. | Title | Guest artist(s) | Player order | Original release date |
|---|---|---|---|---|
| 1 | "Encore concert (Note: Highlights: Returning guest artist Zono appeared on both two specials involving Oppo's co-brand ambassadors: encore concert (of the 1st season) Pich Sophea and Step; and celebrity special (of the 2nd season) played along with Reth Suzana featuring DJ Sdey, Heng Bunleap, Heng Veasna, Keo Sokpheng, Keo Veasna, Janny Min, and Ravan Blaze as mystery singers.)" | — | — | 30 June 2019 |
| 2 | "Celebrity special" | Zono and Reth Suzana | — | 15 August 2020 |
