= 2022 FIFA World Cup qualification (AFC) =

Tournament details
- Dates: 6 June 2019 – 7 June 2022
- Teams: 46 (Note: North Korea withdrew after five matches. Qatar participated to reach the AFC Asian Cup.) (from 1 confederation)

Tournament statistics
- Matches played: 229
- Goals scored: 676 (2.95 per match)
- Attendance: 2,332,162 (10,184 per match)
- Top scorer(s): (United Arab Emirates) Ali Mabkhout (14 goals)

The Asian section of the 2022 FIFA World Cup qualification acted as qualifiers for the 2022 FIFA World Cup, held in Qatar, for national teams who were members of the Asian Football Confederation (AFC). Apart from Qatar (who qualified automatically as hosts), a total of 4.5 slots (4 direct slots and 1 inter-confederation play-off slot) in the final tournament were available for AFC teams.

The qualification process involved four rounds; the first two doubled as the qualification for the 2023 AFC Asian Cup. Despite qualifying as hosts, Qatar participated in these rounds to seek Asian Cup qualification. The first round would have acted as qualifiers for the cancelled 2020 AFC Solidarity Cup.

== Format ==
The qualification structure is as follows:

- First round: 12 teams (ranked 35–46) played home-and-away over two legs. The six winners advanced to the second round.
- Second round: 40 teams (ranked 1–34 and six first-round winners) were divided into eight groups of five teams to play home-and-away round-robin matches. The eight group winners and the four best group runners-up advanced to the third round. Since Qatar won their group, the fifth-best runners-up took their place in the third round.
- Third round: 12 teams which advanced from the second round were divided into two groups of six teams to play home-and-away round-robin matches. The top two teams of each group qualified for the World Cup, and the third-placed teams advanced to the fourth round.
- Fourth round: Two third-placed teams from the third round played a single match. The winner advanced to the inter-confederation play-offs.

== Entrants ==
All 46 FIFA-affiliated nations from the AFC entered qualification. The FIFA World Rankings of April 2019 were used to determine which nations would compete in the first round. For seeding in the second round and third round draws, the most recent FIFA Rankings prior to those draws will be used.

According to the joint format of the World Cup and Asian Cup qualifiers, both Qatar (as the host nation of the 2022 World Cup) and also entered the second round of the qualifiers.

Timor-Leste was banned from participating in the Asian Cup qualification after being found to have fielded a total of 12 ineligible players in 2019 AFC Asian Cup qualification matches among other competitions. However, as FIFA did not ban them from the World Cup qualifiers, Timor-Leste was allowed to enter the competition, but ineligible to qualify for the Asian Cup.

From the April 2019 FIFA World Rankings
Bye to the second round (Ranked 1st to 34th)	Competing in first round (Ranked 35th to 46th)
1. Iran (21); 2. Japan (26); 3. South Korea (37); 4. Australia (41); 5. Qatar (55); 6. United Arab Emirates (67); 7. Saudi Arabia (72); 8. China (74); 9. Iraq (76); 10. Syria (83); 11. Uzbekistan (85); 12. Lebanon (86); 13. Oman (86); 14. Kyrgyzstan (95); 15. Jordan (97); 16. Vietnam (98); 17. Palestine (96); 18. India (99); 19. Bahrain (111); 20. Thailand (114); 21. Tajikistan (120); 22. North Korea (121); 23. Philippines (124); 24. Chinese Taipei (125); 25. Turkmenistan (136); 26. Myanmar (140); 27. Hong Kong (141); 28. Yemen (146); 29. Afghanistan (149); 30. Maldives (151); 31. Kuwait (156); 32. Indonesia (159); 33. Singapore (160); 34. Nepal (161)	35. Malaysia (168); 36. Cambodia (173); 37. Macau (183); 38. Laos (184); 39. Bhutan (186); 40. Mongolia (187); 41. Bangladesh (188); 42. Guam (193); 43. Brunei (194); 44. Timor-Leste (195); 45. Pakistan (200); 46. Sri Lanka (202)

== Schedule ==
The schedule of the competition is expected to be as follows, according to the FIFA International Match Calendar.

On 9 March 2020, FIFA and AFC announced that the second round matches on matchdays 7–10 due to take place in March and June 2020 were postponed by the COVID-19 pandemic, with the new dates to be confirmed. However, subject to approval by FIFA and AFC, and agreement of both member associations, the matches may be played as scheduled provided that the safety of all individuals involved meets the required standards. On 5 June, AFC confirmed that matchdays 7 and 8 were scheduled to take place on 8 and 13 October respectively while matchdays 9 and 10 were also scheduled to kick off on 12 and 17 November. On 12 August, FIFA announced that the matches scheduled for October and November 2020 would be rescheduled to 2021.

On 25 June 2020, FIFA announced that the inter-confederation play-offs, originally scheduled to be played in March 2022, were moved to June.

On 11 November 2020, the AFC Competitions Committee announced that all the Asian qualifiers second round matches should be completed by 15 June 2021 with matchdays 7 and 8 in March 2021 and matchdays 9 and 10 in June 2021 with the final round of the Asian qualifiers beginning in September 2021. Also all 10 matchdays of the Asian qualifiers final round should be finished by the end of March 2022 with the Asian and inter-continental play-offs proposed for the FIFA window of May/June 2022. The Asian play-off for the World Cup in Qatar was proposed as a single match. On the same day, however, FIFA, along with the Bangladeshi and Qatari associations, gave approval to the only second round match originally scheduled for 2020, Qatar v. Bangladesh, which was played on 4 December.

On 19 February 2021, FIFA and AFC postponed the majority of the upcoming matches to June.

Round	Matchday	Date(s)
First round	First leg	6 June 2019
First round	Second leg	11 June 2019
Second round	Matchday 1	5 September 2019
Second round	Matchday 2	10 September 2019
Second round	Matchday 3	10 October 2019
Second round	Matchday 4	15 October 2019
Second round	Matchday 5	14 November 2019
Second round	Matchday 6	19 November 2019
Second round	Matchday 7	25 March, 28 May and 3 June 2021
Second round	Matchday 8	4 December 2020, 30 March and 7 & 9 June 2021
Second round	Matchday 9	30 March, 30 May and 11 June 2021
Second round	Matchday 10	13 and 15 June 2021

Round	Matchday	Date
Third round	Matchday 1	2 September 2021
Third round	Matchday 2	7 September 2021
Third round	Matchday 3	7 October 2021
Third round	Matchday 4	12 October 2021
Third round	Matchday 5	11 November 2021
Third round	Matchday 6	16 November 2021
Third round	Matchday 7	27 January 2022
Third round	Matchday 8	1 February 2022
Third round	Matchday 9	24 March 2022
Third round	Matchday 10	29 March 2022
Fourth round	Single leg	7 June 2022

Original qualifying schedule
Stage	Matchday	Date
Second round	Matchday 7	26 March 2020, later 8 October
Second round	Matchday 8	31 March 2020, later 13 October
Second round	Matchday 9	4 June 2020, later 12 November, then 7 June 2021
Second round	Matchday 10	9 June 2020, later 17 November
Third round	Matchday 1	3 September 2020
Third round	Matchday 2	8 September 2020
Third round	Matchday 3	13 October 2020
Third round	Matchday 4	12 November 2020
Third round	Matchday 5	17 November 2020
Third round	Matchday 6	25 March 2021
Third round	Matchday 7	30 March 2021
Third round	Matchday 8	8 June 2021
Third round	Matchday 9	7 September 2021
Third round	Matchday 10	12 October 2021
Fourth round	First leg	11 November 2021
Fourth round	Second leg	16 November 2021

== First round ==
The draw for the first round was held on 17 April 2019 at 11:00 MST (UTC+8), at the AFC House in Kuala Lumpur, Malaysia.

Team 1	Agg.	Team 2	1st leg	2nd leg
Mongolia	3–2	Brunei	2–0	1–2
Macau	1–3	Sri Lanka	1–0	0–3 (Note: The match was awarded as a 3–0 victory to Sri Lanka, after Macau did not send their team for the match due to safety reasons following the 2019 Sri Lanka Easter bombings.)
Laos	0–1	Bangladesh	0–1	0–0
Malaysia	12–2	Timor-Leste	7–1	5–1
Cambodia	4–1	Pakistan	2–0	2–1
Bhutan	1–5	Guam	1–0	0–5

== Second round ==
The draw for the second round was held on 17 July 2019 at 17:00 MST (UTC+8), at AFC House in Kuala Lumpur, Malaysia.

=== Summary ===
Qualified for the third round (except Qatar) and Asian Cup as winners or top five runners-up
Advanced to the Asian Cup third qualifying round as bottom three runners-up, third-placed, fourth-placed and top three fifth-placed team
Advanced to the AFC Asian Cup qualifying play-off round.
Denotes a team that withdrew.

Group A	Group B	Group C	Group D	Group E	Group F	Group G	Group H
Syria China	Australia	Iran Iraq	Saudi Arabia	Qatar (Note: Qatar had already qualified as hosts of the 2022 FIFA World Cup, so they were only competing for Asian Cup qualification.) Oman	Japan	United Arab Emirates Vietnam	South Korea Lebanon
Philippines Maldives	Kuwait Jordan Nepal	Bahrain Hong Kong	Uzbekistan Palestine Singapore Yemen	India Afghanistan Bangladesh	Tajikistan Kyrgyzstan Mongolia Myanmar	Malaysia Thailand	Turkmenistan Sri Lanka
Guam	Chinese Taipei	Cambodia				Indonesia	
							North Korea

=== Group A ===
Pos	Team	Pld	W	D	L	GF	GA	GD	Pts	Qualification	United Arab Republic	People's Republic of China	Philippines	Maldives	Guam
1	Syria	8	7	0	1	22	7	+15	21	World Cup qualifying third round and Asian Cup	—	2–1	1–0	2–1	4–0
2	China (Note: China qualified for the Asian Cup as the host nation. They withdrew as the host in May 2022.)	8	6	1	1	30	3	+27	19	World Cup qualifying third round and Asian Cup	3–1	—	2–0	5–0	7–0
3	Philippines	8	3	2	3	12	11	+1	11	Asian Cup qualifying third round	2–5	0–0	—	1–1	3–0
4	Maldives	8	2	1	5	7	20	−13	7	Asian Cup qualifying third round	0–4	0–5	1–2	—	3–1
5	Guam	8	0	0	8	2	32	−30	0	Asian Cup qualifying play-off round	0–3	0–7	1–4	0–1	—

Source: FIFA
Rules for classification: Qualification tiebreakers

=== Group B ===
Pos	Team	Pld	W	D	L	GF	GA	GD	Pts	Qualification	Australia	Kuwait	Jordan	Nepal	Chinese Taipei for Olympic games
1	Australia	8	8	0	0	28	2	+26	24	World Cup qualifying third round and Asian Cup	—	3–0	1–0	5–0	5–1
2	Kuwait	8	4	2	2	19	7	+12	14	Asian Cup qualifying third round	0–3	—	0–0	7–0	9–0
3	Jordan	8	4	2	2	13	3	+10	14	Asian Cup qualifying third round	0–1	0–0	—	3–0	5–0
4	Nepal	8	2	0	6	4	22	−18	6	Asian Cup qualifying third round	0–3	0–1	0–3	—	2–0
5	Chinese Taipei	8	0	0	8	4	34	−30	0	Asian Cup qualifying play-off round	1–7	1–2	1–2	0–2	—

Source: FIFA
Rules for classification: Qualification tiebreakers

=== Group C ===
Pos	Team	Pld	W	D	L	GF	GA	GD	Pts	Qualification	Iran	Iraq	Bahrain	Hong Kong	Cambodia
1	Iran	8	6	0	2	34	4	+30	18	World Cup qualifying third round and Asian Cup	—	1–0	3–0	3–1	14–0
2	Iraq	8	5	2	1	14	4	+10	17	World Cup qualifying third round and Asian Cup	2–1	—	0–0	2–0	4–1
3	Bahrain	8	4	3	1	15	4	+11	15	Asian Cup qualifying third round	1–0	1–1	—	4–0	8–0
4	Hong Kong	8	1	2	5	4	13	−9	5	Asian Cup qualifying third round	0–2	0–1	0–0	—	2–0
5	Cambodia	8	0	1	7	2	44	−42	1	Asian Cup qualifying play-off round	0–10	0–4	0–1	1–1	—

Source: FIFA
Rules for classification: Qualification tiebreakers

=== Group D ===
Pos	Team	Pld	W	D	L	GF	GA	GD	Pts	Qualification	Saudi Arabia	Uzbekistan	Palestine	Singapore	Yemen
1	Saudi Arabia	8	6	2	0	22	4	+18	20	World Cup qualifying third round and Asian Cup	—	3–0	5–0	3–0	3–0
2	Uzbekistan	8	5	0	3	18	9	+9	15	Asian Cup qualifying third round	2–3	—	2–0	5–0	5–0
3	Palestine	8	3	1	4	10	10	0	10	Asian Cup qualifying third round	0–0	2–0	—	4–0	3–0
4	Singapore	8	2	1	5	7	22	−15	7	Asian Cup qualifying third round	0–3	1–3	2–1	—	2–2
5	Yemen	8	1	2	5	6	18	−12	5	Asian Cup qualifying third round	2–2	0–1	1–0	1–2	—

Source: FIFA
Rules for classification: Qualification tiebreakers

=== Group E ===
Pos	Team	Pld	W	D	L	GF	GA	GD	Pts	Qualification	Qatar	Oman	India	Afghanistan	Bangladesh
1	Qatar (Note: Qatar has already qualified for the World Cup as the host nation. They are later selected as host replacement within the qualified teams of the Asian Cup.)	8	7	1	0	18	1	+17	22	Asian Cup	—	2–1	0–0	6–0	5–0
2	Oman	8	6	0	2	16	6	+10	18	World Cup qualifying third round and Asian Cup	0–1	—	1–0	3–0	4–1
3	India	8	1	4	3	6	7	−1	7	Asian Cup qualifying third round	0–1	1–2	—	1–1	1–1
4	Afghanistan	8	1	3	4	5	15	−10	6	Asian Cup qualifying third round	0–1	1–2	1–1	—	1–0
5	Bangladesh	8	0	2	6	3	19	−16	2	Asian Cup qualifying third round	0–2	0–3	0–2	1–1	—

Source: FIFA
Rules for classification: Qualification tiebreakers

=== Group F ===
Pos	Team	Pld	W	D	L	GF	GA	GD	Pts	Qualification	Japan	Tajikistan	Kyrgyzstan	Mongolia	Myanmar
1	Japan	8	8	0	0	46	2	+44	24	World Cup qualifying third round and Asian Cup	—	4–1	5–1	6–0	10–0
2	Tajikistan	8	4	1	3	14	12	+2	13	Asian Cup qualifying third round	0–3	—	1–0	3–0	4–0
3	Kyrgyzstan	8	3	1	4	19	12	+7	10	Asian Cup qualifying third round	0–2	1–1	—	0–1	7–0
4	Mongolia	8	2	0	6	3	27	−24	6	Asian Cup qualifying third round	0–14	0–1	1–2	—	1–0
5	Myanmar	8	2	0	6	6	35	−29	6	Asian Cup qualifying third round	0–2	4–3	1–8	1–0	—

Source: FIFA
Rules for classification: Qualification tiebreakers

=== Group G ===
Pos	Team	Pld	W	D	L	GF	GA	GD	Pts	Qualification	United Arab Emirates	Vietnam	Malaysia	Thailand	Indonesia
1	United Arab Emirates	8	6	0	2	23	7	+16	18	World Cup qualifying third round and Asian Cup	—	3–2	4–0	3–1	5–0
2	Vietnam	8	5	2	1	13	5	+8	17	World Cup qualifying third round and Asian Cup	1–0	—	1–0	0–0	4–0
3	Malaysia	8	4	0	4	10	12	−2	12	Asian Cup qualifying third round	1–2	1–2	—	2–1	2–0
4	Thailand	8	2	3	3	9	9	0	9	Asian Cup qualifying third round	2–1	0–0	0–1	—	2–2
5	Indonesia	8	0	1	7	5	27	−22	1	Asian Cup qualifying play-off round	0–5	1–3	2–3	0–3	—

Source: FIFA
Rules for classification: Qualification tiebreakers

=== Group H ===
North Korea withdrew from the qualifying round due to safety concerns related to the COVID-19 pandemic, therefore the results of their matches were excluded from the group standings.

Pos	Team	Pld	W	D	L	GF	GA	GD	Pts	Qualification	South Korea	Lebanon	Turkmenistan	Sri Lanka	North Korea
1	South Korea	6	5	1	0	22	1	+21	16	World Cup qualifying third round and Asian Cup	—	2–1	5–0	8–0	~~Canc.~~
2	Lebanon	6	3	1	2	11	8	+3	10	World Cup qualifying third round and Asian Cup	0–0	—	2–1	3–2	~~0–0~~
3	Turkmenistan	6	3	0	3	8	11	−3	9	Asian Cup qualifying third round	0–2	3–2	—	2–0	~~3–1~~
4	Sri Lanka	6	0	0	6	2	23	−21	0	Asian Cup qualifying third round	0–5	0–3	0–2	—	~~0–1~~
5	North Korea (Note: North Korea withdrew due to safety concerns related to the COVID-19 pandemic: their results were expunged.)	0	0	0	0	0	0	0	0	Withdrew, results expunged	~~0–0~~	~~2–0~~	~~Canc.~~	~~Canc.~~	—

Source: FIFA
Rules for classification: Qualification tiebreakers

=== Ranking of runner-up teams ===
Since North Korea withdrew from Group H, results against the fifth-placed teams of each group were not counted in determining the ranking of the runner-up teams.

Pos	Grp	Team	Pld	W	D	L	GF	GA	GD	Pts	Qualification
1	A	China (Note: China already qualified for the Asian Cup as host nation. They withdrew their hosting right in May 2022.)	6	4	1	1	16	3	+13	13	World Cup qualifying third round and Asian Cup
2	E	Oman	6	4	0	2	9	5	+4	12	World Cup qualifying third round and Asian Cup
3	C	Iraq	6	3	2	1	6	3	+3	11	World Cup qualifying third round and Asian Cup
4	G	Vietnam	6	3	2	1	6	4	+2	11	World Cup qualifying third round and Asian Cup
5	H	Lebanon	6	3	1	2	11	8	+3	10	World Cup qualifying third round and Asian Cup
6	F	Tajikistan	6	3	1	2	7	8	−1	10	Asian Cup qualifying third round
7	D	Uzbekistan	6	3	0	3	12	9	+3	9	Asian Cup qualifying third round
8	B	Kuwait	6	2	2	2	8	6	+2	8	Asian Cup qualifying third round

Source: FIFA
Rules for classification: Tiebreakers

== Third round ==
The third round consisted of two groups of six teams. The first two teams in each group qualified for the World Cup. The two third-placed teams proceeded to the fourth round. The draw was held on 1 July 2021 in Kuala Lumpur, Malaysia.

=== Group A ===
Pos	Team	Pld	W	D	L	GF	GA	GD	Pts	Qualification	Iran	South Korea	United Arab Emirates	Iraq	United Arab Republic	Lebanon
1	Iran	10	8	1	1	15	4	+11	25	2022 FIFA World Cup	—	1–1	1–0	1–0	1–0	2–0
2	South Korea	10	7	2	1	13	3	+10	23	2022 FIFA World Cup	2–0	—	1–0	0–0	2–1	1–0
3	United Arab Emirates	10	3	3	4	7	7	0	12	Fourth round	0–1	1–0	—	2–2	2–0	0–0
4	Iraq	10	1	6	3	6	12	−6	9		0–3	0–3	1–0	—	1–1	0–0
5	Syria	10	1	3	6	9	16	−7	6		0–3	0–2	1–1	1–1	—	2–3
6	Lebanon	10	1	3	6	5	13	−8	6		1–2	0–1	0–1	1–1	0–3	—

Source: FIFA, AFC
Rules for classification: Tiebreakers

=== Group B ===
Pos	Team	Pld	W	D	L	GF	GA	GD	Pts	Qualification	Saudi Arabia	Japan	Australia	Oman	People's Republic of China	Vietnam
1	Saudi Arabia	10	7	2	1	12	6	+6	23	2022 FIFA World Cup	—	1–0	1–0	1–0	3–2	3–1
2	Japan	10	7	1	2	12	4	+8	22	2022 FIFA World Cup	2–0	—	2–1	0–1	2–0	1–1
3	Australia	10	4	3	3	15	9	+6	15	Fourth round	0–0	0–2	—	3–1	3–0	4–0
4	Oman	10	4	2	4	11	10	+1	14		0–1	0–1	2–2	—	2–0	3–1
5	China	10	1	3	6	9	19	−10	6		1–1	0–1	1–1	1–1	—	3–2
6	Vietnam	10	1	1	8	8	19	−11	4		0–1	0–1	0–1	0–1	3–1	—

Source: FIFA, AFC
Rules for classification: Tiebreakers

== Fourth round ==
The two third-placed teams in each group from the third round played against each other in a single match to determine which team advanced to the inter-confederation play-offs.

The match was played in Qatar (host country of the World Cup) on 7 June 2022.

Team 1	Score	Team 2
United Arab Emirates	1–2	Australia

== Inter-confederation play-off ==
The inter-confederation play-offs was determined by a draw held on 26 November 2021. The AFC fourth round winners was drawn against the fifth-placed team from CONMEBOL qualification. The play-off was played also as a single match in Qatar on 13 June 2022.

Team 1	Score	Team 2
Australia	0–0 (a.e.t.) (5–4 p)	Peru

== Qualified teams ==
Status of AFC countries with respect to the 2022 FIFA World Cup: Team has qualified for World Cup Team failed to qualify Team withdrew Country not an AFC member

The following six teams from AFC qualified for the final tournament.

Team	Qualified as	Qualified on	Previous appearances in FIFA World Cup^{1}
Qatar	Hosts	2 December 2010	Debut
Iran	Third round group A winners	27 January 2022	5 (1978, 1998, 2006, 2014, 2018)
South Korea	Third round group A runners-up	1 February 2022	10 (1954, 1986, 1990, 1994, 1998, 2002, 2006, 2010, 2014, 2018)
Japan	Third round group B runners-up	24 March 2022	6 (1998, 2002, 2006, 2010, 2014, 2018)
Saudi Arabia	Third round group B winners	24 March 2022	5 (1994, 1998, 2002, 2006, 2018)
Australia	AFC v CONMEBOL play-off winners	13 June 2022	5 (1974^{2}, 2006^{2}, 2010, 2014, 2018)

^{1} Italic indicates hosts for that year.
^{2} Australia qualified as a member of the OFC in 1974 and 2006 (qualifying took place until 2005 and they left the OFC and joined the AFC in 2006).

== Top goalscorers ==
There were 676 goals scored in 229 matches, for an average of 2.95 goals per match.

14 goals

- (United Arab Emirates national football team) Ali Mabkhout

12 goals

- (China national football team) Wu Lei

10 goals

- (Iran national football team) Sardar Azmoun
- (Japan national football team) Takumi Minamino
- (Japan national football team) Yuya Osako

9 goals

- (Syria national football team) Omar Al Somah

8 goals

- (Vietnam national football team) Nguyễn Tiến Linh

7 goals

- (Australia men's national soccer team) Jamie Maclaren
- (Iran national football team) Karim Ansarifard
- (Iran national football team) Mehdi Taremi
- (Saudi Arabia national football team) Salem Al-Dawsari
- (Saudi Arabia national football team) Saleh Al-Shehri
- (South Korea national football team) Son Heung-min
- (Uzbekistan national football team) Eldor Shomurodov

Below are full goalscorer lists for each round:

- First round
- Second round
- Third round
- Fourth round

== See also ==
- 2023 AFC Asian Cup qualification
