= I Can See Your Voice Cambodia season 1 =

Television game show season

I Can See Your Voice Cambodia
- Season 1
- Starring: Khat Sokhim; Madonna; Nuon Sary; Ou Bunnarat
- Hosted by: Chea Vibol; Sok Rasy
- Winners: Good singers: 10; Bad singers: 5
- No. of episodes: Regular: 15; Special: 1; Overall: 16

Release
- Original network: Hang Meas HDTV
- Original release: Regular season: 10 February – 19 May 2019; Special: 30 June 2019

Season chronology
- Next → Season 2

The first season of the Cambodian television mystery music game show I Can See Your Voice Cambodia premiered on Hang Meas HDTV on 10 February 2019.

== Gameplay ==
=== Format ===
According to the original South Korean rules, the guest artist must attempt to eliminate bad singers during its game phase. At the final performance, the last remaining mystery singer is revealed as either good or bad by means of a duet between them and one of the guest artists.

If the last remaining mystery singer is good, they will have to perform again at the encore concert; if a singer is bad, they win 1,000,000៛.

=== Rounds ===
1. Visual round
  The guest artist is given some time to observe and examine each mystery singer based on their appearance. Afterward, a muted video of each mystery singer that reveals only 0.3 seconds of their singing voice is played as an additional hint.
2. Introduction round
  Each mystery singer introduces to the guest artist and panelists with its own voice. Good singers are telling the truth, while bad singers are allowed to lie.
3. Lip sync round
  Each mystery singer performs a lip sync to a song; good singers mime to a recording of their own, while bad singers mime to a backing track by another vocalist.
4. Talent round
  The guest artist must describe one of the mystery singer's other talents, except "singing" itself. This may not be related to the "stage of truth", but depends on their identity.

== Episodes ==
=== Guest artists ===
Legend:
Good singer
Bad singer

Episode		Guest artist (Note: Players' note: For the returning guest artists (who also include foreigners and former good singers), names are displayed in italics.)	Winner
#	Date	Guest artist	Winner
1	10 February 2019	Pich Sophea	Good
2	17 February 2019	Nop Bayyareth	Good
3	24 February 2019	Sokun Nisa	Good
4	3 March 2019	Zono	Good
5	10 March 2019	Reth Suzana	Good
6	17 March 2019	Step	Bad
7	24 March 2019	Sok Sreyneang	Good
8	31 March 2019	Chhorn Sovannareach	Good
9	7 April 2019	Tep Boprek	Bad
10	14 April 2019	Khan Makara	Good
11	21 April 2019	Vy Dyneth	Good
12	28 April 2019	Ek Siday	Bad
13	5 May 2019	Ny Ratanna	Bad
14	12 May 2019	Chheng Mearnich	Bad
15	19 May 2019	Hour Lavy	Good
Special	30 June 2019	Encore concert (Note: Season highlight: Returning guest artist Zono appeared in an encore concert along with Oppo's co-brand ambassadors, Pich Sophea and Step.)	

=== Panelists ===
Legend:
Regular panelist
Additional panelist
Guest panelist

Apps		Panelists in attendance (Sorted by first appearance, with episode designations)
g#	p#	Panelists in attendance (Sorted by first appearance, with episode designations)
10	1	Ou Bunnarat (1–9, 11)
7	3	Nuon Sary (3, 5, 7, 9, 11, 13–14); Khat Sokhim (4, 6–8, 10, 12, 15); Madonna (6, 8–9, 11, 13–15)
5	1	Un Sopheun (7–8, 10–11, 14)
4	2	Chuong Chi (1, 4, 10, 12); Neay Kcheab (5, 10, 13, 15)
3	2	Touch Sreyleak (1, 3, 9); Vong Dara Ratana (2, 6, 12)
2	4	Yeuk Duongdara (1, 11); Chab Chean (2–3); Sao Danita (4, 13); You Soksothea (12, 14)
1	17	Keav Channimol (1); Srey Leap and Suos Viza (2); Sok Seylalin (3); Noy Vanneth (4); Eh Phouthong and Kong Socheat (5); Hang Socheata (6); Trey Vichat (7); John Chanleakna (8); Nueon Sunnary (9); Nhim Chanthorn (10); Poppy (12); Horm Choerong (13); Suong Hun (14); Noum Phearoul and Tim Rotha (15)
