= I Can See Your Voice Cambodia season 3 =

Television game show season

I Can See Your Voice Cambodia
- Season 3
- Starring: Khat Sokhim; Madonna; Ou Bunnarat
- Hosted by: Chea Vibol; Sok Rasy
- Winners: Good singers: 12; Bad singers: 3
- No. of episodes: 15

Release
- Original network: Hang Meas HDTV
- Original release: 1 April – 22 July 2022

Season chronology
- ← Previous; Season 2 Next → Season 4

The third season of the Cambodian television mystery music game show I Can See Your Voice Cambodia was originally scheduled to premiere on Hang Meas HDTV for the fourth quarter of 2023, but it began airing earlier on 1 April 2022.

== Gameplay ==
=== Format ===
According to the original South Korean rules, the guest artist must attempt to eliminate bad singers during its game phase. At the final performance, the last remaining mystery singer is revealed as either good or bad by means of a duet between them and one of the guest artists.

If the last remaining mystery singer is good, they will have to perform again at the encore concert; if a singer is bad, they win 1,000,000៛.

=== Rounds ===
1. Visual round
  The guest artist is given some time to observe and examine each mystery singer based on their appearance. Afterward, a muted video of each mystery singer that reveals only 0.3 seconds of their singing voice is played as an additional hint.
2. Introduction round
  Each mystery singer introduces to the guest artist and panelists with its own voice. Good singers are telling the truth, while bad singers are allowed to lie.
3. Lip sync round
  Each mystery singer performs a lip sync to a song; good singers mime to a recording of their own, while bad singers mime to a backing track by another vocalist.
4. Talent round
  The guest artist must describe one of the mystery singer's other talents, except "singing" itself. This may not be related to the "stage of truth", but depends on their identity.

== Episodes ==
=== Guest artists ===
Legend:
Good singer
Bad singer

Episode		Guest artist (Note: Players' note: For the returning guest artists (who also include foreigners and former good singers), names are displayed in italics.)	Winner
#	Date	Guest artist	Winner
1	1 April 2022	Sok Pisey	Good
2	10 April 2022	Khan James	Bad
3	17 April 2022	Sokun Nisa	Good
4	24 April 2022	Pich Sophea	Good
5	8 May 2022	Thy Chanthea	Good
6	20 May 2022	Ny Ratanna	Good
7	27 May 2022	Vy Dyneth	Good
8	3 June 2022	Chhorn Sovannareach	Bad
9	10 June 2022	Sok Seylalin	Good
10	17 June 2022	Nop Bayyareth	Good
11	24 June 2022	Zono	Good
12	1 July 2022	Sopheak Kosoma	Good
13	8 July 2022	Ann Visal	Bad
14	15 July 2022	Chhin Ratanak	Good
15	22 July 2022	Tel Thai	Good

=== Panelists ===
Legend:
Regular panelist
Additional panelist
Guest panelist

Apps		Panelists in attendance (Sorted by first appearance, with episode designations)
g#	p#	Panelists in attendance (Sorted by first appearance, with episode designations)
10	1	Ou Bunnarat (1–8, 14–15)
9	1	Madonna (1, 3, 5–6, 8, 10, 12–14)
8	1	Khat Sokhim (1, 2, 5, 7, 9, 11, 13–14)
5	1	Nuon Sary (6, 8, 10, 12, 15)
3	5	Un Sopheun (2, 7, 13); Srey Leap (3–4, 15); Aun Sorng (4, 7, 12); Chhuon Rithy (4, 9, 13); Neay Kcheab (5, 9–10)
2	1	Chuong Chi (11–12)
1	26	Sarai Sakna and Tho Ratanakpiseth (1); Kim Liza, and Phea Sopheaktra (2); Doung Manich and Lean Sony (3); Yem Samonn (4); Chan Sreyneat (5); Srey Pov and Van Sun (6); Nakhon (7); Kong Vicheka and Suong Hun (8); Hang Socheata and Jruk Prey (9); H.E.N.G. and Nhim Chanthorn (10); Ny Sonita, Srey Rong, and Vong Dara Ratana (11); Pen Sarav (12); Tep Anak (13); Kong Sothearith and Pov Lida (14); Poppy and Pov Piseth (15)
