= 2020 AFC Solidarity Cup =

Tournament details
- Dates: Cancelled
- Teams: 8 (from 1 confederation)

The 2020 AFC Solidarity Cup was originally planned to be the 2nd edition of the AFC Solidarity Cup, an international football tournament organized by the Asian Football Confederation (AFC).

In April 2016, it was proposed to take place in September 2020 but was rescheduled to December. In May 2019, it was rescheduled once more to March 2020. The AFC announced on 17 September 2019 that it was to be played between 30 November and 13 December 2020. However, because of the COVID-19 pandemic in Asia, the Solidarity Cup could not be played as scheduled. On 10 September 2020, the AFC announced that the 2020 tournament would be cancelled, with the next edition planned to be played in 2024; the 2024 edition would never take place as AFC abolished the tournament in November 2023.

Nepal were the defending champions.

== Qualified teams ==
The competition would have been contested by a maximum of ten teams. All teams which were neither competing in the third round of the 2022 FIFA World Cup qualifiers nor the third round of the 2023 AFC Asian Cup qualifiers would have been eligible to enter, including:

- The six teams which were eliminated from the first round of the 2022 FIFA World Cup and 2023 AFC Asian Cup joint qualifiers.
- The four teams which were eliminated from the play-off round of the 2023 AFC Asian Cup qualifiers. The AFC later changed the format (after the cancellation of the tournament) due to which only two teams were eliminated from the play-off round, and thus there were no confirmed teams from the play-off round which qualified for the tournament.

Team	Qualified as	Qualified on	Previous appearances in tournament (Note: Bold indicates champion for that year. Italic indicates host for that year.)	Previous best performance
Bhutan	AFC first round loser	11 June 2019	0 (debut)	—
Brunei	AFC first round loser	11 June 2019	1 (2016)	Fourth place (2016)
Timor-Leste	AFC first round loser	11 June 2019	1 (2016)	Group stage (2016)
Laos	AFC first round loser	11 June 2019	1 (2016)	Third place (2016)
Pakistan	AFC first round loser	11 June 2019	0 (debut) (Note: Pakistan had qualified for the 2016 edition but later withdrew. Therefore, this would be Pakistan's 1st appearance.)	—
Macau	AFC first round loser	27 June 2019 (Note: Macau did not send their team for the second leg due to safety reasons following the 2019 Sri Lanka Easter bombings. The AFC referred the matter to FIFA, which announced on 27 June 2019 that the match was declared a 3–0 forfeit victory to Sri Lanka, and consequently qualifying Sri Lanka to the second round.)	1 (2016)	Runners-up (2016)
Chinese Taipei	AFC playoff round loser (Note: The play-off round was originally supposed to be consisted of 12 teams playing for 2 rounds. Following both Qatar and China's qualifications to the 2023 AFC Asian Cup, the number was reduced from 12 to 4 (after the cancellation of the tournament). Therefore, there were no confirmed teams from the play-off round which qualified for the tournament.)	11 October 2021	0 (debut)	—
Guam	AFC playoff round loser	12 October 2021	0 (debut)	—
