= I Can See Your Voice Cambodia season 2 =

Television game show season

I Can See Your Voice Cambodia
- Season 2
- Starring: Nuon Sary; Ou Bunnarat
- Hosted by: Chea Vibol; Sok Rasy
- Winners: Good singers: 15; Bad singers: 0
- No. of episodes: Regular: 15; Special: 1; Overall: 16

Release
- Original network: Hang Meas HDTV
- Original release: Regular season: 5 April – 12 June 2020; Special: 15 August 2020

Season chronology
- ← Previous; Season 1 Next → Season 3

The second season of the Cambodian television mystery music game show I Can See Your Voice Cambodia premiered on Hang Meas HDTV on 5 April 2020.

At the time of filming during the COVID-19 pandemic, health and safety protocols are also implemented.

== Gameplay ==
=== Format ===
According to the original South Korean rules, the guest artist must attempt to eliminate bad singers during its game phase. At the final performance, the last remaining mystery singer is revealed as either good or bad by means of a duet between them and one of the guest artists.

If the last remaining mystery singer is good, they will have to perform again at the encore concert; if a singer is bad, they win 1,000,000៛.

=== Rounds ===
1. Visual round
  The guest artist is given some time to observe and examine each mystery singer based on their appearance. Afterward, a muted video of each mystery singer that reveals only 0.3 seconds of their singing voice is played as an additional hint.
2. Introduction round
  Each mystery singer introduces to the guest artist and panelists with its own voice. Good singers are telling the truth, while bad singers are allowed to lie.
3. Lip sync round
  Each mystery singer performs a lip sync to a song; good singers mime to a recording of their own, while bad singers mime to a backing track by another vocalist.
4. Talent round
  The guest artist must describe one of the mystery singer's other talents, except "singing" itself. This may not be related to the "stage of truth", but depends on their identity.

== Episodes ==
=== Guest artists ===
Legend:
Good singer
Bad singer

Episode		Guest artist (Note: Players' note: For the returning guest artists (who also include foreigners and former good singers), names are displayed in italics.)	Winner
#	Date	Guest artist	Winner
1	5 April 2020	En Sereyvong	Good
2	12 April 2020	Sim Thaina	Good
3	19 April 2020	Chhom Chhorvin	Good
4	26 April 2020	Sok Mearch	Good
5	3 May 2020	Oeun Sreymom	Good
6	10 May 2020	Leng Bunna	Good
7	17 May 2020	Chann Samphors	Good
8	24 May 2020	Pich Ponleu	Good
9	31 May 2020	Sopheak Kosoma	Good
10	7 June 2020	Noy Vanneth	Good
11	14 June 2020	Chum Lino	Good
12	21 June 2020	Chamroeun Sopheak	Good
13	28 June 2020	Nov Sinoern	Good
14	5 June 2020	Chhuon Sovannchhai	Good
15	12 June 2020	Yem Samonn	Good
Special	15 August 2020	Celebrity special (Note: Season highlight: Returning guest artist Zono played along with Oppo's co-brand ambassador Reth Suzana in a celebrity special, featuring DJ Sdey, Heng Bunleap, Heng Veasna, Keo Sokpheng, Keo Veasna, Janny Min, and Ravan Blaze as mystery singers.)	

=== Panelists ===
Legend:
Regular panelist
Guest panelist

Apps		Panelists in attendance (Sorted by first appearance, with episode designations)
g#	p#	Panelists in attendance (Sorted by first appearance, with episode designations)
12	1	Ou Bunnarat (1, 3, 5–10, 12, 14–15; sp. 1)
9	1	Nuon Sary (1–5, 7, 9, 11, 13)
7	1	Un Sopheun (1–2, 6, 8–9, 12; sp. 1)
5	2	Madonna (1, 3, 8, 13–14); Chhuon Rithy (9, 11–13, 15)
4	1	Chuong Chi (2, 5, 7, 11)
3	4	Neay Kcheab (2, 4, 15); Suon Samoeun (3, 10, 15); Khat Sokhim (6, 12; sp. 1); You Soksothea (10, 14–15)
2	3	Prem Prey (4, 11); Tho Ratanakpiseth (7; sp. 1); Srey Leap (9, 14)
1	19	Meas Rithy (1); Vong Dara Ratana (2); Rin Savath (3); Tim Rotha and Yeuk Duongdara (4); Horm Chhora and Thorn Leakena (5); Leng Chenla and Pich Sophea (6); Pen Sreypech (7); DJ Maily and Step (8); Suong Hun (10); Ny Monineath (11); Ret Sozana (12); Neay Kloeup and Nhim Chanthorn (13); Doctor Rith (14); Phancake (sp. 1)
