= I Can See Your Voice Cambodia =

Cambodian television game show

- Genre: Game show
- Based on: I Can See Your Voice by CJ ENM
- Presented by: Chea Vibol (s1–4); Sok Rasy (s1–4); Pen Sreypich (s4)
- Starring: The celebrity panelists (see cast)
- Country of origin: Cambodia
- Original language: Khmer
- No. of seasons: 4
- No. of episodes: Regular: 54; Special: 2; Overall: 56

Production
- Camera setup: Multi-camera
- Production company: Rasmey Hang Meas Production

Original release
- Network: Hang Meas HDTV
- Release: 10 February 2019 – 22 July 2022
- Release: 25 September 2026 – present

Related
- I Can See Your Voice franchise

I Can See Your Voice Cambodia is a Cambodian television mystery music game show based on the South Korean programme of the same title, featuring its format where guest artist(s) attempt to eliminate bad singers from the group, until the last mystery singer remains for a duet performance. It first aired on Hang Meas HDTV on 10 February 2019.

== Gameplay ==
=== Format ===
Over the course of four rounds, the guest artist(s) must attempt to eliminate bad singers from a group of seven "mystery singers", identified only by their occupation or alias, without ever hearing them perform live. They are assisted by clues regarding the singers' backgrounds, style of performance, and observations from a celebrity panel. At the end of a game, the last remaining mystery singer is revealed as either good or bad by means of a duet between them and one of the guest artists.

If the last remaining mystery singer is good, they will have to perform again at the encore concert; if a singer is bad, they win 1,000,000៛.

=== Rounds ===
==== Visual round ====
- s1–3: The guest artist is given some time to observe and examine each mystery singer based on their appearance. Afterward, a muted video of each mystery singer that reveals only 0.3 seconds of their singing voice is played as an additional hint.

==== Introduction round ====
- s1–3: Each mystery singer introduces to the guest artist and panelists with its own voice. Good singers are telling the truth, while bad singers are allowed to lie.

==== Lip sync round ====
- s1–3: Each mystery singer performs a lip sync to a song; good singers mime to a recording of their own, while bad singers mime to a backing track by another vocalist.

==== Talent round ====
- s1–3: The guest artist must describe one of the mystery singer's other talents, except "singing" itself. This may not be related to the "stage of truth", but depends on their identity.

== Production ==
The Asia Business Daily provisionally announced a Cambodian adaptation of I Can See Your Voice, at the time when (South Korean) third season of the same title concluded on 15 September 2016; this was subsequently confirmed by Rasmey Hang Meas Media Group in January 2019.

== Broadcast history ==
I Can See Your Voice Cambodia debuted on 10 February 2019, with filming taking place at Hang Meas Studio 2 inside Aeon Mall Sen Sok in Phnom Penh. An encore concert was held on 30 June 2019, featuring guest performers Zono, as well as Oppo's co-brand ambassadors Pich Sophea and Step.

In the second season that premiered on 5 April 2020, returning guest artists Zono and Reth Suzana played in a celebrity special on 15 August 2020, featuring DJ Sdey, Heng Bunleap, Heng Veasna, Keo Sokpheng, Keo Veasna, Janny Min, and Ravan Blaze as mystery singers. At the time of production during the COVID-19 pandemic, health and safety protocols had also implemented.

In March 2022, a series of trailers formally announced that the third season would premiere on 1 April 2022, earlier than its originally scheduled fourth quarter of 2023. This similar approach in August 2026 has also announced the fourth season, which began airing on 25 September 2026.

== Cast ==
The series employs a panel of celebrity "detectives" who assist the guest artists in identifying good and bad mystery singers throughout the game. Along with regular members, guest panelists also appear since the first season. Overall, four celebrities have served as panelists, with their original lineup consisting of Khat Sokhim, Madonna, Nuon Sary, and Ou Bunnarat.

Designations:
Main cast member	H Hosting duties
Additional cast member	g# Total games attended, by panelists

Cast member	Seasons			
Cast member	1	2	3	4
Chea Vibol	H	H	H	H
Sok Rasy	H	H	H	H
Khat Sokhim	7		8	TBA
Madonna	7		9	TBA
Nuon Sary	7	9		TBA
Ou Bunnarat	11	12	10	TBA
Pen Sreypich				H

== Series overview ==
Series	Episodes	Originally released		Good singers	Bad singers
Series	Episodes	First released	Last released	Good singers	Bad singers
1	15	10 February 2019	19 May 2019	10	5
2	15	5 April 2020	12 June 2020	15	0
3	15	1 April 2022	22 July 2022	12	3
4	9	25 September 2026	present	7	2
Sp	2	30 June 2019	15 August 2020	—N/a	—N/a
