= 2023 AFC Asian Cup qualification – play-off round =

Tournament details
- Dates: 7–12 October 2021
- Teams: 4 (from 1 confederation)

Tournament statistics
- Matches played: 4
- Goals scored: 10 (2.5 per match)
- Top scorer(s): Ten players (1 goal each)

The play-off round of the 2023 AFC Asian Cup qualification was played between 7 and 12 October 2021. It was originally scheduled for 3–8 September, 13 October and 17 November 2020, but the AFC changed the dates due to the COVID-19 pandemic in Asia.

== Format ==
A total of four teams (the four lowest fifth-placed teams of the Asian Cup qualifying second round) competed in the play-off round. The two play-off winners joined the 22 teams which advanced directly from the Asian Cup qualifying second round to the third round, to compete for the final 11 slots in the 2023 AFC Asian Cup.

The play-off round was originally supposed to be consisted of 12 teams playing for 2 rounds. Following both Qatar and China's qualifications for the final tournament, the number was reduced from 12 to 4. The play-off losers would have joined the six teams which lost in the Asian Cup qualifying first round. They were to compete for the 2020 AFC Solidarity Cup, which was cancelled.

== Qualified teams ==
Group (Second round)	Fifth place (worst 4)
A	Guam
B	Chinese Taipei
C	Cambodia
G	Indonesia

== Draw ==
The draw for the play-off round was held on 24 June 2021, 15:00 MYT (UTC+8), at the AFC House in Kuala Lumpur, Malaysia. The four teams (Cambodia, Chinese Taipei, Guam, and Indonesia) were drawn into two pairings. The team drawn first in each pairing hosted the first leg, and the team drawn second in each pairing hosted the second leg.

== Matches ==
Each tie was played on a home-and-away two-legged basis. The away goals rule, extra time (away goals do not apply in extra time) and penalty shoot-out would have been used to decide the winner if necessary (Regulations Article 8.4).

The first leg was played on 7 and 9 October, and the return leg was played on 11 and 12 October 2021. Due to the COVID-19 pandemic, these fixtures were held in neutral grounds, with Bahrain and Thailand hosting these occasions.

=== Summary ===
Team 1	Agg.	Team 2	1st leg	2nd leg
Guam	1–3	Cambodia	0–1	1–2
Indonesia	5–1	Chinese Taipei	2–1	3–0

=== Details ===
9 October 2021
20:30 UTC+3

Guam	0–1	Cambodia
	Report	Vathanaka 26'

Khalifa Sports City Stadium, Isa Town (Bahrain)
Attendance: 0
Referee: Hussein Abo Yehia (Lebanon)
12 October 2021
18:30 UTC+3

Cambodia	2–1	Guam
Suhana 51'; Sokpheng 55'	Report	Mendiola 36'

Khalifa Sports City Stadium, Isa Town (Bahrain)
Attendance: 0
Referee: Ismaeel Habib (Bahrain)

Cambodia won 3–1 on aggregate.

7 October 2021
19:00 UTC+7

Indonesia	2–1	Chinese Taipei
Rumakiek 16'; Evan 48'	Report	Hsu Heng-pin 90'

Buriram Stadium, Buriram (Thailand)
Attendance: 0
Referee: Payam Heydari (Iran)
11 October 2021
20:00 UTC+7

Chinese Taipei	0–3	Indonesia
	Report	Egy 26'; Kambuaya 55'; Witan 90+3'

Buriram Stadium, Buriram (Thailand)
Attendance: 0
Referee: Mohammad Arafah (Jordan)

Indonesia won 5–1 on aggregate.

== Goalscorers ==
There were 10 goals scored in 4 matches, for an average of 2.5 goals per match.

1 goal

- (Cambodia national football team) Chan Vathanaka
- (Cambodia national football team) Keo Sokpheng
- (Cambodia national football team) Sos Suhana
- (Chinese Taipei national football team) Hsu Heng-pin
- (Guam national football team) Devan Mendiola
- (Indonesia national football team) Evan Dimas
- (Indonesia national football team) Egy Maulana Vikri
- (Indonesia national football team) Ricky Kambuaya
- (Indonesia national football team) Ramai Rumakiek
- (Indonesia national football team) Witan Sulaeman
