= I Can See Your Voice Cambodia season 4 =

Television game show season

I Can See Your Voice Cambodia
- Season 4
- Hosted by: Chea Vibol; Pen Sreypich; Sok Rasy
- Winners: Good singers: 7; Bad singers: 2
- No. of episodes: 9

Release
- Original network: Hang Meas HDTV
- Original release: 25 September 2026 – present

Season chronology
- ← Previous; Season 3

The fourth season of the Cambodian television mystery music game show I Can See Your Voice Cambodia premiered on Hang Meas HDTV on 25 September 2026.

== Gameplay ==
=== Format ===
According to the original South Korean rules, the guest artist must attempt to eliminate bad singers during its game phase. At the final performance, the last remaining mystery singer is revealed as either good or bad by means of a duet between them and one of the guest artists.

If the last remaining mystery singer is good, they will have to perform again at the encore concert; if a singer is bad, they win 1,000,000៛.

=== Rounds ===
1. Visual round
  The guest artist is given some time to observe and examine each mystery singer based on their appearance. Afterward, a muted video of each mystery singer that reveals only 0.3 seconds of their singing voice is played as an additional hint.
2. Introduction round
  Each mystery singer introduces to the guest artist and panelists with its own voice. Good singers are telling the truth, while bad singers are allowed to lie.
3. Lip sync round
  Each mystery singer performs a lip sync to a song; good singers mime to a recording of their own, while bad singers mime to a backing track by another vocalist.
4. Talent round
  The guest artist must describe one of the mystery singer's other talents, except "singing" itself. This may not be related to the "stage of truth", but depends on their identity.

== Episodes ==
=== Guest artists ===
Legend:
Good singer
Bad singer

Episode		Guest artist (Note: Players' notes: For the returning guest artists (who also include foreigners and former good singers), names are displayed in italics.; For the mixed groups, names who identified as bad singers are displayed in italics.)	Mystery singers (In their respective numbers and aliases)						
#	Date	Guest artist	Elimination order						Winner
#	Date	Guest artist	Visual round	Introduction round	Lip sync round		Talent round		Winner
1	25 September 2026	Sok Seylalin	6. Ou Ou; (Cosmetics Shop CEO)	2. Bakha; (Content Creator)	1. Saman; (TikTok Star)	7. Ah Saek; (Hair Salon Manager)	4. Ah Khroun; (Hairdresser)	5. Khan Sey; (Dentist)	3. Kotha; Sports Equipment Saleswoman
2	2 October 2026	Nop Bayyareth	2. Ros Yeab; (Delivery Rider)	6. Bao You; (Cafeteria Employee #1)	7. Avuth; (Businesswoman)	3. Meulu; (Promotional Model)	1. Srey Leap; (Barista)	4. Ah Teong; (Footballer)	5. Leta; Acoustic Singer
3	9 October 2026	Suos Viza	1. Bak Chhong; (Fruit Vendor)	7. Lulu; (Fashion Designer #1)	2. CM; (Furniture Salesman)	3. Zin; (Aroma Analyst)	6. Ah Chrauch; (Clothing Sales Associate)	5. Kraopum; (Salon Owner)	4. Kip Sey; Sales Professional
4	16 October 2026	Vong Dara Ratana	1. Tete; (Fashion Designer #2)	6. Asangha; (Real Estate Sales Associate)	7. Hem; (Watchmaker)	2. C-Reus; (Busker)	3. Ah Chhit; (Cafeteria Owner)	5. Dosae; (Facial Masseuse)	4. Basout; Perfume Specialist
5	23 October 2026	Phorn Sreykhouch	5. Ah Heum; (Vehicle Service Expert)	6. Khluot Sey; (Doll Designer)	2. Auyesh; (Lounge Singer #1)	3. Bros Tauch; (Designer)	7. Lee Yeong-jae; (Club Singer)	1. Leuk Sey; (Wedding Invitation Printer)	4. Pim Him; Cafeteria Employee #2
6	30 October 2026	Pich Sophea	4. Kraopum; (Beverage Shop Owner)	6. Josie; (Young Entrepreneur)	7. Ah Chhert; (Chef)	5. Ah Veng; (Auto Garage Mechanic)	1. Ah Khlay; (Painting Sales Associate)	3. P.C.; (Culinary Influencer)	2. Sara; Fashion Designer #3
7	6 November 2026	Kong Chamroeun	1. Jinhu; (House Painting Company Manager)	2. David; (Drummer)	5. Achek; (Rural Singer)	7. Daro; (Cafeteria Manager)	4. Kaka; (Car Sales Promoter)	3. Sena; (Cafeteria Employee #3)	6. Pressy; Automotive Service Manager
8	13 November 2026	Chamroeun Sopheak	3. Kaki; (Lounge Singer #2)	1. Champa; (Cafeteria Employee #4)	2. Bandeth; (Violinist)	4. Srey Touch; (Tour Boat Manager)	5. Chamroeun; (Sculptor)	7. Kashen; (Pastry Chef)	6. Luka; Hotel Employee
9	20 November 2026	Lim Tichmeng	4. Chai Thom; (Traditional Clothing Designer)	6. Chong Hoe; (Real Estate Sales Representative)	2. Ningning; (Spa Employee)	3. Ah Dambong; (Rice Vendor)	7. Virya; (Song Maker)	5. John; (Florist)	1. Acho; Barber
10	27 November 2026	TBA	1. ()	2. ()	3. ()	4. ()	5. ()	6. ()	7. ()
11	4 December 2026	TBA	1. ()	2. ()	3. ()	4. ()	5. ()	6. ()	7. ()
12	11 December 2026	TBA	1. ()	2. ()	3. ()	4. ()	5. ()	6. ()	7. ()

=== Panelists ===
Legend:
Regular panelist
Guest panelist

Apps		Panelists in attendance (Sorted by first appearance, with episode designations)
g#	p#	Panelists in attendance (Sorted by first appearance, with episode designations)
6	1	Madonna (1–5, 9)
4	2	Ou Bunnarat (1–2, 4, 7); Khat Sokhim (1, 3, 5, 8)
3	4	Suong Hun (2–3, 5); Neay Kcheab and Pu Noy (3, 6, 9); Chuong Chi (5, 7–8)
2	3	Chea Sarman (1, 7); Seng Chenda (2, 4); Srey Leap (4, 9)
1	13	Tep Rindaro (1); Ros Sotheavy (2); Nob Dane (4); Pha Pheung (5); Chem Saroeun, Chhin Manich, and Hang Socheata (6); Oeun Saeng and Sim Chanponloue (7); Hung Bunleap, Neang Teav, and Prem Prey (8); Suong Thithiany (9)
