= 2023 AFC Asian Cup qualification =

Tournament details
- Dates: 6 June 2019 – 14 June 2022
- Teams: 46 (Note: North Korea withdrew after five matches. Timor-Leste participated to reach the World Cup.) (from 1 confederation)

Tournament statistics
- Matches played: 208
- Goals scored: 665 (3.2 per match)
- Attendance: 2,080,030 (10,000 per match)
- Top scorer: (United Arab Emirates) Ali Mabkhout (11 goals)

The 2023 AFC Asian Cup qualification was the qualification process organized by the Asian Football Confederation (AFC) to determine the participating teams for the 2023 AFC Asian Cup, the 18th edition of the international men's football championship of Asia.

The qualification process involved four rounds, where the first two rounds doubled as the 2022 FIFA World Cup qualification for Asian teams. Only the first round acted as qualifiers for the cancelled 2020 AFC Solidarity Cup as the six teams which were eliminated from the first round of the 2022 World Cup and 2023 Asian Cup joint qualifiers. The two teams that were eliminated from the play-off round of the Asian Cup qualifiers were among the four teams that would have qualified for the Solidarity Cup.

== Format ==
The qualification structure was as follows:

- First round: 12 teams (ranked 35–46) played home-and-away over two legs. The six winners advanced to the second round.
- Second round: 40 teams (ranked 1–34 and six first round winners) were divided into eight groups of five teams to play home-and-away round-robin matches.
  - The eight group winners and the five best group runners-up qualified for the AFC Asian Cup (and advance to the third round of 2022 FIFA World Cup qualifiers).
  - The next 22 highest ranked teams (the remaining three group runners-up, the eight third-placed teams, the eight fourth-placed teams and the three best groups fifth-placed teams) advanced directly to the third round of Asian Cup qualification.
  - The remaining 4 teams entered the play-off round to contest the remaining two spots in the third round of Asian Cup qualification.
- Play-off round: There was one round of home-and-away two-legged play-off matches that determined the final two qualifiers for the third round.
- Third round: The 24 teams were divided into six groups of four to play single round-robin matches in six centralised venues, and they competed for the remaining slots of the Asian Cup.

== Entrants ==
The 46 FIFA-affiliated nations from the AFC entered qualification, with the April 2019 FIFA Men's World Rankings used to determine which nations would compete in the first round and which nations would receive a bye through to the second round. For seeding in the second round and third round draws, the most recent FIFA Rankings prior to those draws have been expected to be used.

Due to the joint format of the World Cup and Asian Cup qualifiers, Qatar (as the host nation of the 2022 FIFA World Cup) also entered the second round of Asian Cup qualifiers.

The following restrictions were applied:

- Northern Mariana Islands, which was not a FIFA member, could not enter.
- Timor-Leste was barred from participating in the Asian Cup qualification after being found to have fielded a total of twelve ineligible players in 2019 AFC Asian Cup qualification matches, among other competitions. However, as FIFA did not ban Timor-Leste from the World Cup qualifiers, the country was allowed to enter the competition, but was ineligible to qualify for the Asian Cup.

From the April 2019 FIFA World Rankings
Bye to the second round (Ranked 1st to 34th)	Competing in first round (Ranked 35th to 46th)
1. Iran (21); 2. Japan (26); 3. South Korea (37); 4. Australia (41); 5. Qatar (55); 6. United Arab Emirates (67); 7. Saudi Arabia (72); 8. China (74); 9. Iraq (76); 10. Syria (83); 11. Uzbekistan (85); 12. Lebanon (86); 13. Oman (86); 14. Kyrgyzstan (95); 15. Jordan (97); 16. Vietnam (98); 17. Palestine (99); 18. India (101); 19. Bahrain (111); 20. Thailand (114); 21. Tajikistan (120); 22. North Korea (121); 23. Philippines (124); 24. Chinese Taipei (125); 25. Turkmenistan (136); 26. Myanmar (140); 27. Hong Kong (141); 28. Yemen (146); 29. Afghanistan (149); 30. Maldives (151); 31. Kuwait (156); 32. Indonesia (159); 33. Singapore (160); 34. Nepal (161)	35. Malaysia (168); 36. Cambodia (173); 37. Macau (183); 38. Laos (184); 39. Bhutan (186); 40. Mongolia (187); 41. Bangladesh (188); 42. Guam (193); 43. Brunei (194); 44. Timor-Leste (195); 45. Pakistan (200); 46. Sri Lanka (202)

== Schedule ==
The schedule of the competition was as follows in the tables below.

On 9 March 2020, FIFA and AFC announced that the second round matches on matchdays 7–10 due to take place in March and June 2020 were postponed to later dates due to the COVID-19 pandemic, with the new dates to be confirmed. However, subject to approval by FIFA and AFC, and agreement of both member associations, the matches could be played as scheduled provided that the safety of all individuals involved met the required standards. On 5 June, AFC confirmed that matchdays 7 and 8 were scheduled to take place on 8 and 13 October respectively, while matchdays 9 and 10 were also scheduled to kick off on 12 and 17 November. On 12 August, AFC announced that the upcoming qualifying matches for the 2022 World Cup and 2023 Asian Cup, originally scheduled to take place during the international match windows in October and November 2020, were rescheduled to 2021.

On 11 November 2020, the AFC Competitions Committee agreed at its meeting that all remaining second round matches were to be completed by 15 June 2021, with matchdays 7 and 8 in March, and matchdays 9 and 10 in June. However, on the same day, FIFA, along with the Bangladeshi and Qatari member associations, gave approval to the only second round match originally scheduled for 2020, Qatar v Bangladesh, which was played on 4 December.

On 19 February 2021, FIFA and AFC postponed the majority of the upcoming matches to June. On 20 October, the AFC reported that the third round would begin in June 2022, with the final round draw to be held earlier in February.

Round	Matchday	Date(s)
First round	First leg	6 June 2019
First round	Second leg	11 June 2019
Second round	Matchday 1	5 September 2019
Second round	Matchday 2	10 September 2019
Second round	Matchday 3	10 October 2019
Second round	Matchday 4	15 October 2019
Second round	Matchday 5	14 November 2019
Second round	Matchday 6	19 November 2019
Second round	Matchday 7	25 March, 28 May and 3 June 2021
Second round	Matchday 8	4 December 2020, 30 March and 7 and 9 June 2021
Second round	Matchday 9	30 March, 30 May and 11 June 2021
Second round	Matchday 10	13 and 15 June 2021

Round	Matchday	Date
Play-off round	First leg	7 and 9 October 2021
Play-off round	Second leg	11 and 12 October 2021
Third round	Matchday 1	8 June 2022
Third round	Matchday 2	11 June 2022
Third round	Matchday 3	14 June 2022

Original qualifying schedule
Stage	Matchday	Date
Second round	Matchday 7	26 March 2020, later 8 October
Second round	Matchday 8	31 March 2020, later 13 October
Second round	Matchday 9	4 June 2020, later 12 November, then 7 June 2021
Second round	Matchday 10	9 June 2020, later 17 November
Play-off round	Round 1 first leg	3 September 2020
Play-off round	Round 1 second leg	8 September 2020
Play-off round	Round 2 first leg	13 October 2020
Play-off round	Round 2 second leg	17 November 2020
Third round	Matchday 1	30 March 2021, later 11 November
Third round	Matchday 2	8 June 2021, later 16 November
Third round	Matchday 3	7 September 2021, later 1 February 2022
Third round	Matchday 4	12 October 2021, later 24 March 2022
Third round	Matchday 5	16 November 2021, later 29 March 2022
Third round	Matchday 6	29 March 2022, later 14 June

== First round ==
The draw for the first round took place on 17 April 2019 at 11:00 MST (UTC+8), at the AFC House in Kuala Lumpur, Malaysia.

The six teams eliminated from this round progressed to the cancelled 2020 AFC Solidarity Cup.

Team 1	Agg.	Team 2	1st leg	2nd leg
Mongolia	3–2	Brunei	2–0	1–2
Macau	1–3	Sri Lanka	1–0	0–3 (Note: The match was awarded as a 3–0 victory to Sri Lanka, after Macau did not send their team for the match due to safety reasons following the 2019 Sri Lanka Easter bombings.)
Laos	0–1	Bangladesh	0–1	0–0
Malaysia	12–2	Timor-Leste	7–1	5–1
Cambodia	4–1	Pakistan	2–0	2–1
Bhutan	1–5	Guam	1–0	0–5

== Second round ==
The draw for the second round was held on 17 July 2019 at 17:00 MST (UTC+8), at AFC House in Kuala Lumpur, Malaysia.

=== Groups ===
==== Group A ====
Pos	Team	Pld	W	D	L	GF	GA	GD	Pts	Qualification	United Arab Republic	People's Republic of China	Philippines	Maldives	Guam
1	Syria	8	7	0	1	22	7	+15	21	World Cup qualifying third round and Asian Cup	—	2–1	1–0	2–1	4–0
2	China (Note: China qualified for the Asian Cup as the host nation. They withdrew as the host in May 2022.)	8	6	1	1	30	3	+27	19	World Cup qualifying third round and Asian Cup	3–1	—	2–0	5–0	7–0
3	Philippines	8	3	2	3	12	11	+1	11	Asian Cup qualifying third round	2–5	0–0	—	1–1	3–0
4	Maldives	8	2	1	5	7	20	−13	7	Asian Cup qualifying third round	0–4	0–5	1–2	—	3–1
5	Guam	8	0	0	8	2	32	−30	0	Asian Cup qualifying play-off round	0–3	0–7	1–4	0–1	—

Source: FIFA
Rules for classification: Qualification tiebreakers

==== Group B ====
Pos	Team	Pld	W	D	L	GF	GA	GD	Pts	Qualification	Australia	Kuwait	Jordan	Nepal	Chinese Taipei for Olympic games
1	Australia	8	8	0	0	28	2	+26	24	World Cup qualifying third round and Asian Cup	—	3–0	1–0	5–0	5–1
2	Kuwait	8	4	2	2	19	7	+12	14	Asian Cup qualifying third round	0–3	—	0–0	7–0	9–0
3	Jordan	8	4	2	2	13	3	+10	14	Asian Cup qualifying third round	0–1	0–0	—	3–0	5–0
4	Nepal	8	2	0	6	4	22	−18	6	Asian Cup qualifying third round	0–3	0–1	0–3	—	2–0
5	Chinese Taipei	8	0	0	8	4	34	−30	0	Asian Cup qualifying play-off round	1–7	1–2	1–2	0–2	—

Source: FIFA
Rules for classification: Qualification tiebreakers

==== Group C ====
Pos	Team	Pld	W	D	L	GF	GA	GD	Pts	Qualification	Iran	Iraq	Bahrain	Hong Kong	Cambodia
1	Iran	8	6	0	2	34	4	+30	18	World Cup qualifying third round and Asian Cup	—	1–0	3–0	3–1	14–0
2	Iraq	8	5	2	1	14	4	+10	17	World Cup qualifying third round and Asian Cup	2–1	—	0–0	2–0	4–1
3	Bahrain	8	4	3	1	15	4	+11	15	Asian Cup qualifying third round	1–0	1–1	—	4–0	8–0
4	Hong Kong	8	1	2	5	4	13	−9	5	Asian Cup qualifying third round	0–2	0–1	0–0	—	2–0
5	Cambodia	8	0	1	7	2	44	−42	1	Asian Cup qualifying play-off round	0–10	0–4	0–1	1–1	—

Source: FIFA
Rules for classification: Qualification tiebreakers

==== Group D ====
Pos	Team	Pld	W	D	L	GF	GA	GD	Pts	Qualification	Saudi Arabia	Uzbekistan	Palestine	Singapore	Yemen
1	Saudi Arabia	8	6	2	0	22	4	+18	20	World Cup qualifying third round and Asian Cup	—	3–0	5–0	3–0	3–0
2	Uzbekistan	8	5	0	3	18	9	+9	15	Asian Cup qualifying third round	2–3	—	2–0	5–0	5–0
3	Palestine	8	3	1	4	10	10	0	10	Asian Cup qualifying third round	0–0	2–0	—	4–0	3–0
4	Singapore	8	2	1	5	7	22	−15	7	Asian Cup qualifying third round	0–3	1–3	2–1	—	2–2
5	Yemen	8	1	2	5	6	18	−12	5	Asian Cup qualifying third round	2–2	0–1	1–0	1–2	—

Source: FIFA
Rules for classification: Qualification tiebreakers

==== Group E ====
Pos	Team	Pld	W	D	L	GF	GA	GD	Pts	Qualification	Qatar	Oman	India	Afghanistan	Bangladesh
1	Qatar (Note: Qatar has already qualified for the World Cup as the host nation. They are later selected as host replacement within the qualified teams of the Asian Cup.)	8	7	1	0	18	1	+17	22	Asian Cup	—	2–1	0–0	6–0	5–0
2	Oman	8	6	0	2	16	6	+10	18	World Cup qualifying third round and Asian Cup	0–1	—	1–0	3–0	4–1
3	India	8	1	4	3	6	7	−1	7	Asian Cup qualifying third round	0–1	1–2	—	1–1	1–1
4	Afghanistan	8	1	3	4	5	15	−10	6	Asian Cup qualifying third round	0–1	1–2	1–1	—	1–0
5	Bangladesh	8	0	2	6	3	19	−16	2	Asian Cup qualifying third round	0–2	0–3	0–2	1–1	—

Source: FIFA
Rules for classification: Qualification tiebreakers

==== Group F ====
Pos	Team	Pld	W	D	L	GF	GA	GD	Pts	Qualification	Japan	Tajikistan	Kyrgyzstan	Mongolia	Myanmar
1	Japan	8	8	0	0	46	2	+44	24	World Cup qualifying third round and Asian Cup	—	4–1	5–1	6–0	10–0
2	Tajikistan	8	4	1	3	14	12	+2	13	Asian Cup qualifying third round	0–3	—	1–0	3–0	4–0
3	Kyrgyzstan	8	3	1	4	19	12	+7	10	Asian Cup qualifying third round	0–2	1–1	—	0–1	7–0
4	Mongolia	8	2	0	6	3	27	−24	6	Asian Cup qualifying third round	0–14	0–1	1–2	—	1–0
5	Myanmar	8	2	0	6	6	35	−29	6	Asian Cup qualifying third round	0–2	4–3	1–8	1–0	—

Source: FIFA
Rules for classification: Qualification tiebreakers

==== Group G ====
Pos	Team	Pld	W	D	L	GF	GA	GD	Pts	Qualification	United Arab Emirates	Vietnam	Malaysia	Thailand	Indonesia
1	United Arab Emirates	8	6	0	2	23	7	+16	18	World Cup qualifying third round and Asian Cup	—	3–2	4–0	3–1	5–0
2	Vietnam	8	5	2	1	13	5	+8	17	World Cup qualifying third round and Asian Cup	1–0	—	1–0	0–0	4–0
3	Malaysia	8	4	0	4	10	12	−2	12	Asian Cup qualifying third round	1–2	1–2	—	2–1	2–0
4	Thailand	8	2	3	3	9	9	0	9	Asian Cup qualifying third round	2–1	0–0	0–1	—	2–2
5	Indonesia	8	0	1	7	5	27	−22	1	Asian Cup qualifying play-off round	0–5	1–3	2–3	0–3	—

Source: FIFA
Rules for classification: Qualification tiebreakers

==== Group H ====
North Korea withdrew due to safety concerns related to the COVID-19 pandemic: their results were expunged.

Pos	Team	Pld	W	D	L	GF	GA	GD	Pts	Qualification	South Korea	Lebanon	Turkmenistan	Sri Lanka	North Korea
1	South Korea	6	5	1	0	22	1	+21	16	World Cup qualifying third round and Asian Cup	—	2–1	5–0	8–0	~~Canc.~~
2	Lebanon	6	3	1	2	11	8	+3	10	World Cup qualifying third round and Asian Cup	0–0	—	2–1	3–2	~~0–0~~
3	Turkmenistan	6	3	0	3	8	11	−3	9	Asian Cup qualifying third round	0–2	3–2	—	2–0	~~3–1~~
4	Sri Lanka	6	0	0	6	2	23	−21	0	Asian Cup qualifying third round	0–5	0–3	0–2	—	~~0–1~~
5	North Korea (Note: North Korea withdrew due to safety concerns related to the COVID-19 pandemic: their results were expunged.)	0	0	0	0	0	0	0	0	Withdrew, results expunged	~~0–0~~	~~2–0~~	~~Canc.~~	~~Canc.~~	—

Source: FIFA
Rules for classification: Qualification tiebreakers

=== Ranking of runner-up teams ===
Group H contained only four teams compared to five teams in all other groups after North Korea withdrew from the competition. Therefore, the results against the fifth-placed team were not counted when determining the ranking of the runner-up teams.

Pos	Grp	Team	Pld	W	D	L	GF	GA	GD	Pts	Qualification
1	A	China (Note: China already qualified for the Asian Cup as host nation. They withdrew their hosting right in May 2022.)	6	4	1	1	16	3	+13	13	World Cup qualifying third round and Asian Cup
2	E	Oman	6	4	0	2	9	5	+4	12	World Cup qualifying third round and Asian Cup
3	C	Iraq	6	3	2	1	6	3	+3	11	World Cup qualifying third round and Asian Cup
4	G	Vietnam	6	3	2	1	6	4	+2	11	World Cup qualifying third round and Asian Cup
5	H	Lebanon	6	3	1	2	11	8	+3	10	World Cup qualifying third round and Asian Cup
6	F	Tajikistan	6	3	1	2	7	8	−1	10	Asian Cup qualifying third round
7	D	Uzbekistan	6	3	0	3	12	9	+3	9	Asian Cup qualifying third round
8	B	Kuwait	6	2	2	2	8	6	+2	8	Asian Cup qualifying third round

Source: FIFA
Rules for classification: Tiebreakers

=== Ranking of fifth-placed teams ===
Pos	Grp	Team	Pld	W	D	L	GF	GA	GD	Pts	Qualification
1	F	Myanmar	8	2	0	6	6	35	−29	6	Asian Cup qualifying third round
2	D	Yemen	8	1	2	5	6	18	−12	5	Asian Cup qualifying third round
3	E	Bangladesh	8	0	2	6	3	19	−16	2	Asian Cup qualifying third round
4	G	Indonesia	8	0	1	7	5	27	−22	1	Asian Cup qualifying play-off round
5	C	Cambodia	8	0	1	7	2	44	−42	1	Asian Cup qualifying play-off round
6	B	Chinese Taipei	8	0	0	8	4	34	−30	0	Asian Cup qualifying play-off round
7	A	Guam	8	0	0	8	2	32	−30	0	Asian Cup qualifying play-off round

Source: FIFA
Rules for classification: Tiebreakers

== Play-off round ==
Four teams competed in a single round for two slots to the third round. It was planned to have a total of eight slots for the third round be available from this round (four from round 1, four from round 2) and the four teams that were to be eliminated from this stage would have progressed to the later cancelled 2020 AFC Solidarity Cup.

Team 1	Agg.	Team 2	1st leg	2nd leg
Guam	1–3	Cambodia	0–1	1–2
Indonesia	5–1	Chinese Taipei	2–1	3–0

== Third round ==
A total of 24 teams competed in the third round of AFC Asian Cup qualifiers. Since the then-2023 hosts China advanced to the 2022 FIFA World Cup qualifying third round, the automatic slot for the hosts was no longer necessary, and a total of 11 slots for the Asian Cup were available from this round.

=== Groups ===
2023 AFC Asian Cup qualification tiebreakers
The teams were ranked according to points (3 points for a win, 1 point for a draw, 0 points for a loss). If tied on points, tiebreakers were applied in the following order (Regulations Article 7.3):
1. Points in head-to-head matches among tied teams;
2. Goal difference in head-to-head matches among tied teams;
3. Goals scored in head-to-head matches among tied teams;
4. Away goals scored in head-to-head matches among tied teams; (was not applied as the qualifiers were played in centralized venues)
5. If more than two teams were tied, and after applying criteria 1 to 3, a subset of teams was still tied, criteria 1 to 3 were reapplied exclusively to this subset of teams;
6. Goal difference in all group matches;
7. Goals scored in all group matches;
8. Penalty shoot-out if only two teams were tied and they met in the last round of the group;
9. Disciplinary points (yellow card = 1 point, red card as a result of two yellow cards = 3 points, direct red card = 3 points, yellow card followed by direct red card = 4 points);
10. Drawing of lots.

==== Group A ====
Pos	Team	Pld	W	D	L	GF	GA	GD	Pts	Qualification	Jordan	Indonesia	Kuwait	Nepal
1	Jordan	3	3	0	0	6	0	+6	9	2023 AFC Asian Cup	—	—	3–0	2–0
2	Indonesia	3	2	0	1	9	2	+7	6	2023 AFC Asian Cup	0–1	—	—	7–0
3	Kuwait (H)	3	1	0	2	5	6	−1	3		—	1–2	—	—
4	Nepal	3	0	0	3	1	13	−12	0		—	—	1–4	—

Source: AFC
(H) Hosts

==== Group B ====
Pos	Team	Pld	W	D	L	GF	GA	GD	Pts	Qualification	Palestine	Philippines	Mongolia	Yemen
1	Palestine	3	3	0	0	10	0	+10	9	2023 AFC Asian Cup	—	4–0	1–0	—
2	Philippines	3	1	1	1	1	4	−3	4		—	—	—	0–0
3	Mongolia (H)	3	1	0	2	2	2	0	3		—	0–1	—	—
4	Yemen	3	0	1	2	0	7	−7	1		0–5	—	0–2	—

Source: AFC
(H) Hosts

==== Group C ====
Pos	Team	Pld	W	D	L	GF	GA	GD	Pts	Qualification	Uzbekistan	Thailand	Maldives	Sri Lanka
1	Uzbekistan (H)	3	3	0	0	9	0	+9	9	2023 AFC Asian Cup	—	2–0	—	3–0
2	Thailand	3	2	0	1	5	2	+3	6	2023 AFC Asian Cup	—	—	3–0	—
3	Maldives	3	1	0	2	1	7	−6	3		0–4	—	—	1–0
4	Sri Lanka	3	0	0	3	0	6	−6	0		—	0–2	—	—

Source: AFC
(H) Hosts

==== Group D ====
Pos	Team	Pld	W	D	L	GF	GA	GD	Pts	Qualification	India	Hong Kong	Afghanistan	Cambodia
1	India (H)	3	3	0	0	8	1	+7	9	2023 AFC Asian Cup	—	4–0	—	2–0
2	Hong Kong	3	2	0	1	5	5	0	6	2023 AFC Asian Cup	—	—	2–1	—
3	Afghanistan	3	0	1	2	4	6	−2	1		1–2	—	—	2–2
4	Cambodia	3	0	1	2	2	7	−5	1		—	0–3	—	—

Source: AFC
(H) Hosts

==== Group E ====
Pos	Team	Pld	W	D	L	GF	GA	GD	Pts	Qualification	Bahrain	Malaysia	Turkmenistan	Bangladesh
1	Bahrain	3	3	0	0	5	1	+4	9	2023 AFC Asian Cup	—	—	1–0	2–0
2	Malaysia (H)	3	2	0	1	8	4	+4	6	2023 AFC Asian Cup	1–2	—	—	4–1
3	Turkmenistan	3	1	0	2	3	5	−2	3		—	1–3	—	—
4	Bangladesh	3	0	0	3	2	8	−6	0		—	—	1–2	—

Source: AFC
(H) Hosts

==== Group F ====
Pos	Team	Pld	W	D	L	GF	GA	GD	Pts	Qualification	Tajikistan	Kyrgyzstan	Singapore	Myanmar
1	Tajikistan	3	2	1	0	5	0	+5	7	2023 AFC Asian Cup	—	—	—	4–0
2	Kyrgyzstan (H)	3	2	1	0	4	1	+3	7	2023 AFC Asian Cup	0–0	—	2–1	—
3	Singapore	3	1	0	2	7	5	+2	3		0–1	—	—	—
4	Myanmar	3	0	0	3	2	12	−10	0		—	0–2	2–6	—

Source: AFC
(H) Hosts

==== Ranking of runner-up teams ====
Pos	Grp	Team	Pld	W	D	L	GF	GA	GD	Pts	Qualification
1	F	Kyrgyzstan	3	2	1	0	4	1	+3	7	2023 AFC Asian Cup
2	A	Indonesia	3	2	0	1	9	2	+7	6	2023 AFC Asian Cup
3	E	Malaysia	3	2	0	1	8	4	+4	6	2023 AFC Asian Cup
4	C	Thailand	3	2	0	1	5	2	+3	6	2023 AFC Asian Cup
5	D	Hong Kong	3	2	0	1	5	5	0	6	2023 AFC Asian Cup
6	B	Philippines	3	1	1	1	1	4	−3	4	

Source: AFC
Rules for classification: Tiebreakers

== Qualified teams ==
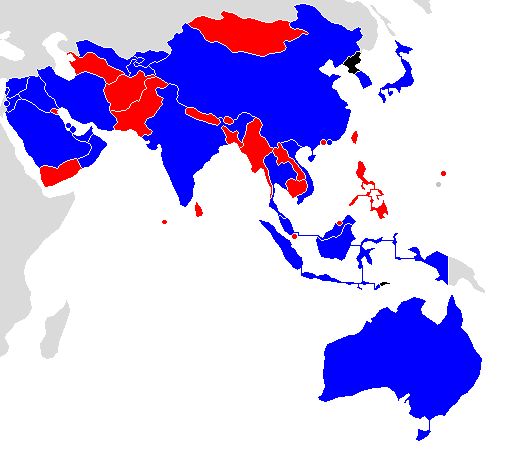
Qualified for Asian Cup Failed to qualify Disqualified or withdrew Not an AFC member

The following 24 teams qualified for the final tournament in Qatar.

Team	Method of qualification	Date of qualification	Finals appearances	Last appearance	Previous best performance
China	Former hosts and Second round Group A runners-up	4 June 2019 (Note: China was awarded hosting rights on 4 June 2019. They later finished as second round Group A runners-up on 15 June 2021, which would have qualified them for the tournament regardless. China later withdrew their hosting rights on 14 May 2022.)	13th	2019	Runners-up (1984, 2004)
Japan	Second round Group F winners	28 May 2021	10th	2019	Winners (1992, 2000, 2004, 2011)
Syria	Second round Group A winners	7 June 2021	7th	2019	Group stage (1980, 1984, 1988, 1996, 2011, 2019)
Qatar	Second round Group E winners and hosts	7 June 2021	11th	2019	Winners (2019)
South Korea	Second round Group H winners	9 June 2021	15th	2019	Winners (1956, 1960)
Australia	Second round Group B winners	11 June 2021	5th	2019	Winners (2015)
Iran	Second round Group C winners	15 June 2021	15th	2019	Winners (1968, 1972, 1976)
Saudi Arabia	Second round Group D winners	15 June 2021	11th	2019	Winners (1984, 1988, 1996)
United Arab Emirates	Second round Group G winners	15 June 2021	11th	2019	Runners-up (1996)
Iraq	Second round Group C runners-up	15 June 2021	10th	2019	Winners (2007)
Oman	Second round Group E runners-up	15 June 2021	5th	2019	Round of 16 (2019)
Vietnam	Second round Group G runners-up	15 June 2021	5th	2019	Fourth place (1956, (Note: As South Vietnam) 1960)
Lebanon	Second round Group H runners-up	15 June 2021	3rd	2019	Group stage (2000, 2019)
Palestine	Third round Group B winners	14 June 2022	3rd	2019	Group stage (2015, 2019)
Uzbekistan	Third round Group C winners	14 June 2022	8th	2019	Fourth place (2011)
Thailand	Third round Group C runners-up	14 June 2022	8th	2019	Third place (1972)
India	Third round Group D winners	14 June 2022	5th	2019	Runners-up (1964)
Hong Kong	Third round Group D runners-up	14 June 2022	4th	1968	Third place (1956)
Tajikistan	Third round Group F winners	14 June 2022	1st	Debut	None
Kyrgyzstan	Third round Group F runners-up	14 June 2022	2nd	2019	Round of 16 (2019)
Bahrain	Third round Group E winners	14 June 2022	7th	2019	Fourth place (2004)
Malaysia	Third round Group E runners-up	14 June 2022	4th	2007	Group stage (1976, 1980, 2007)
Jordan	Third round Group A winners	14 June 2022	5th	2019	Quarter-finals (2004, 2011)
Indonesia	Third round Group A runners-up	14 June 2022	5th	2007	Group stage (1996, 2000, 2004, 2007)

== Top goalscorers ==
There were 665 goals scored in 208 matches, for an average of 3.2 goals per match.

11 goals

- (United Arab Emirates national football team) Ali Mabkhout

10 goals

- (Uzbekistan national football team) Eldor Shomurodov

9 goals

- (Japan national football team) Takumi Minamino
- (Kuwait national football team) Yousef Nasser

8 goals

- (China national football team) Wu Lei
- (Japan national football team) Yuya Osako

7 goals

- (India national football team) Sunil Chhetri
- (Iran national football team) Karim Ansarifard
- (Iran national football team) Sardar Azmoun
- (Malaysia national football team) Safawi Rasid
- (Syria national football team) Omar Al Somah

6 goals

- (Australia men's national soccer team) Harry Souttar
- (Jordan national football team) Baha' Faisal
- (Palestine national football team) Oday Dabbagh
- (Qatar national football team) Almoez Ali
- (Singapore national football team) Ikhsan Fandi
- (South Korea national football team) Kim Shin-wook
- (Syria national football team) Mahmoud Al-Mawas

Below is full goalscorers lists for all rounds:

- First round
- Second round
- Play-off round
- Third round

== See also ==
- 2022 FIFA World Cup qualification (AFC)
