= Mohammed Yameen =

Palestinian footballer (born 1994)

Personal information
- Full name: Mohammed Iyad Ghaleb Yamin
- Date of birth: 19 September 1994 (age 32)
- Place of birth: Tel Aviv, Israel
- Height: 1.78 m (5 ft 10 in)
- Position: Midfielder

Team information
- Current team: Jabal Al-Mukaber
- Number: 6

Senior career*
Years	Team	Apps	(Gls)
2013–2016	Islami Kalkelea		
2016–2017	Thaqafi Tulkarem		
2017–2020	Hilal Al-Quds		
2020–2023	Shabab Al-Khalil		
2023–	Jabal Al-Mukaber		

International career^{‡}
2016–	Palestine	25	(1)
- * Club domestic league appearances and goals as of 22:13, 16 February 2021 (UTC) ‡ National team caps and goals as of 22:13, 16 February 2021 (UTC)

Mohammed Iyad Ghaleb Yamin (Arabic: محمد إياد غالب يامين; born 19 September 1994) is a professional footballer who plays as a midfielder for West Bank Premier League club Jabal Al-Mukaber. Born in Israel, he represents the Palestine national team.

== International goals ==
List of international goals scored by Mohammed Yameen
No.	Date	Venue	Opponent	Score	Result	Competition
1	11 June 2022	MFF Football Centre, Ulaanbaatar	Yemen	3–0	5–0	2023 AFC Asian Cup qualification
2	14 June 2022	MFF Football Centre, Ulaanbaatar	Philippines	3–0	4–0	2023 AFC Asian Cup qualification
