= 2022 FIFA World Cup qualification – AFC first round =

International football competition

Tournament details
- Dates: 6-11 June 2019
- Teams: 12 (from 1 confederation)

Tournament statistics
- Matches played: 12
- Goals scored: 32 (2.67 per match)
- Attendance: 91,876 (7,656 per match)
- Top scorer(s): (Malaysia) Shahrel Fikri (4 goals)

The AFC first round of 2022 FIFA World Cup qualification, which also served as the first round of 2023 AFC Asian Cup qualification, was played from 6 to 11 June 2019.

== Format ==
A total of twelve teams (teams ranked 35–46 in the AFC entrant list) played home-and-away over two legs. The six winners advanced to the second round.

The six losers were eligible to enter the 2020 AFC Solidarity Cup, which was subsequently cancelled.

Timor-Leste were barred from participating in the qualification tournament after being found to have fielded a total of twelve ineligible players in 2019 AFC Asian Cup qualification matches, among other competitions. However, as FIFA did not bar Timor-Leste from the 2022 FIFA World Cup qualifiers, they were still allowed to enter the competition, but were ineligible to qualify for the Asian Cup.

== Seeding ==
The draw for the first round was held on 17 April 2019 at 11:00 MST (UTC+8), at the AFC House in Kuala Lumpur, Malaysia.

The seeding was based on the FIFA World Rankings of April 2019 (shown in parentheses below). Teams from Pot A hosted the first leg, while teams from Pot B hosted the second leg.

Note: Bolded teams qualified for the second round.

| Pot A | Pot B |
|---|---|
| 1. **Malaysia** (168); 2. **Cambodia** (173); 3. Macau (183); 4. Laos (184); 5. Bhutan (186); 6. **Mongolia** (187) | 7. **Bangladesh** (188); 8. **Guam** (193); 9. Brunei (194); 10. Timor-Leste (195) (Note: Timor-Leste was already barred for the 2023 AFC Asian Cup but were competing to qualify for the 2022 FIFA World Cup.); 11. Pakistan (200); 12. **Sri Lanka** (202) |

== Summary ==
The first legs were played on 6–7 June, and the second legs on 11 June 2019.

| Team 1 | Agg. | Team 2 | 1st leg | 2nd leg |
|---|---|---|---|---|
| **Mongolia** | 3–2 | Brunei | 2–0 | 1–2 |
| Macau | 1–3 | **Sri Lanka** | 1–0 | 0–3 (Note: The match was awarded as a 3–0 victory to Sri Lanka, after Macau did not send their team for the match due to safety reasons following the 2019 Sri Lanka Easter bombings.) |
| Laos | 0–1 | **Bangladesh** | 0–1 | 0–0 |
| **Malaysia** | 12–2 | Timor-Leste | 7–1 | 5–1 |
| **Cambodia** | 4–1 | Pakistan | 2–0 | 2–1 |
| Bhutan | 1–5 | **Guam** | 1–0 | 0–5 |

== Matches ==
6 June 2019
17:00 UTC+8

| Mongolia | 2–0 | Brunei |
|---|---|---|
| Tsedenbal 9'; Naranbold 69' | Report (FIFA); Report (AFC) |

MFF Football Centre, Ulaanbaatar
Attendance: 1,685
Referee: Pranjal Banerjee (India)
11 June 2019
20:15 UTC+8

| Brunei | 2–1 | Mongolia |
|---|---|---|
| Razimie 5', 34' | Report (FIFA); Report (AFC) | Tsedenbal 47' (pen.) |

Hassanal Bolkiah National Stadium, Bandar Seri Begawan
Attendance: 17,210
Referee: Ahmad Yacoub Ibrahim (Jordan)

Mongolia won 3–2 on aggregate and advanced to the second round.

6 June 2019
19:30 UTC+8

| Macau | 1–0 | Sri Lanka |
|---|---|---|
| Duarte 52' | Report (FIFA); Report (AFC) |

Zhuhai Sports Center Stadium, Zhuhai (China) (Note: Macau played their home match in Zhuhai, China, due to ongoing maintenance of Estádio Campo Desportivo.)
Attendance: 901
Referee: Kim Dae-yong (South Korea)
11 June 2019
15:30 UTC+5:30

| Sri Lanka | 3–0 Awarded | Macau |
|---|---|---|
| | Report (FIFA); Report (AFC) |

Sugathadasa Stadium, Colombo
Referee: Çarymyrat Kurbanow (Turkmenistan)

Sri Lanka won 3–1 on aggregate and advanced to the second round.

6 June 2019
18:30 UTC+7

| Laos | 0–1 | Bangladesh |
|---|---|---|
| | Report (FIFA); Report (AFC) | Rabiul 72' |

New Laos National Stadium, Vientiane
Attendance: 4,572
Referee: Ho Wai Sing (Hong Kong)
11 June 2019
19:00 UTC+6

| Bangladesh | 0–0 | Laos |
|---|---|---|
| | Report (FIFA); Report (AFC) |

Bangabandhu National Stadium, Dhaka
Attendance: 7,453
Referee: Timur Faizullin (Kyrgyzstan)

Bangladesh won 1–0 on aggregate and advanced to the second round.

7 June 2019 (Note: The Malaysia v Timor-Leste match, originally to be played on 6 June 2019, was postponed due to Eid al-Fitr celebrations following a request from the Football Association of Malaysia.)
20:45 UTC+8

| Malaysia | 7–1 | Timor-Leste |
|---|---|---|
| Corbin-Ong 12'; Shahrel 23'; Norshahrul 43'; Safawi 45', 59'; Faiz 78'; Akhyar 89' | Report (FIFA); Report (AFC) | João Pedro 52' |

Bukit Jalil National Stadium, Kuala Lumpur
Attendance: 4,244
Referee: Sherzod Kasimov (Uzbekistan)
11 June 2019
20:45 UTC+8

| Timor-Leste | 1–5 | Malaysia |
|---|---|---|
| Gama 72' | Report (FIFA); Report (AFC) | Shahrel 11', 17', 64'; Sumareh 37'; Akhyar 55' |

Bukit Jalil National Stadium, Kuala Lumpur (Malaysia) (Note: Timor-Leste played their home match in Malaysia due to a lack of a suitable venue in their country.)
Attendance: 12,776
Referee: Yusuke Araki (Japan)

Malaysia won 12–2 on aggregate and advanced to the second round.

6 June 2019
18:30 UTC+7

| Cambodia | 2–0 | Pakistan |
|---|---|---|
| Chanthea 81'; Sokumpheak 84' | Report (FIFA); Report (AFC) |

Phnom Penh Olympic Stadium, Phnom Penh
Attendance: 33,706
Referee: Shaun Evans (Australia)
11 June 2019
19:00 UTC+3

| Pakistan | 1–2 | Cambodia |
|---|---|---|
| Bashir 17' (pen.) | Report (FIFA); Report (AFC) | Rosib 64'; Bunheing 89' |

Hamad bin Khalifa Stadium, Doha (Qatar) (Note: Pakistan played their home match in Qatar.)
Attendance: 300
Referee: Hanna Hattab (Syria)

Cambodia won 4–1 on aggregate and advanced to the second round.

6 June 2019
18:00 UTC+6

| Bhutan | 1–0 | Guam |
|---|---|---|
| Ts. Dorji 35' | Report (FIFA); Report (AFC) |

Changlimithang Stadium, Thimphu
Attendance: 8,000
Referee: Omar Al-Yaqoubi (Oman)
11 June 2019
15:15 UTC+10

| Guam | 5–0 | Bhutan |
|---|---|---|
| Lagutang 23'; Cunliffe 27', 82', 90+4'; Malcolm 51' | Report (FIFA); Report (AFC) |

Guam F.A. National Training Center, Dededo
Attendance: 1,029
Referee: Yu Ming-hsun (Chinese Taipei)

Guam won 5–1 on aggregate and advanced to the second round.

== Goalscorers ==
There were 32 goals scored in 11 matches, for an average of 2.91 goals per match.

4 goals

- (Malaysia national football team) Shahrel Fikri

3 goals

- (Guam national football team) Jason Cunliffe

2 goals

- (Brunei national football team) Razimie Ramlli
- (Malaysia national football team) Akhyar Rashid
- (Malaysia national football team) Safawi Rasid
- (Mongolia national football team) Norjmoogiin Tsedenbal

1 goal

- (Bangladesh national football team) Robiul Hasan
- (Bhutan national football team) Tshering Dorji
- (Cambodia national football team) Kouch Sokumpheak
- (Cambodia national football team) Reung Bunheing
- (Cambodia national football team) Sath Rosib
- (Cambodia national football team) Sieng Chanthea
- (Guam national football team) Isiah Lagutang
- (Guam national football team) Shane Malcolm
- (Macau national football team) Filipe Duarte
- (Malaysia national football team) La'Vere Corbin-Ong
- (Malaysia national football team) Faiz Nasir
- (Malaysia national football team) Norshahrul Idlan
- (Malaysia national football team) Mohamadou Sumareh
- (Mongolia national football team) Nyam-Osor Naranbold
- (Pakistan national football team) Hassan Bashir
- (Timor-Leste national football team) Rufino Gama
- (Timor-Leste national football team) João Pedro
