= 2023 AFC Asian Cup qualification – third round =

Tournament details
- Dates: 8–14 June 2022
- Teams: 24 (from 1 confederation)

Tournament statistics
- Matches played: 36
- Goals scored: 104 (2.89 per match)
- Attendance: 393,645 (10,935 per match)
- Top scorer(s): (India) Sunil Chhetri (4 goals)

The third round of 2023 AFC Asian Cup qualification was played from 8 to 14 June 2022 in six centralised venues. It was originally scheduled for 30 March 2021 to 29 March 2022, but the Asian Football Confederation (AFC) changed the dates on multiple occasions due to postponements of matches in the second round, impacted by the COVID-19 pandemic in Asia.

== Format ==
A total of 24 teams (22 teams which advanced from the second round and two teams which advanced from the play-off round) participated in the third round to compete for the final eleven slots in the 2023 AFC Asian Cup. Since the 2023 former hosts China advanced to the third round of the 2022 FIFA World Cup qualifiers, the automatic slot for the hosts was no longer necessary.

The 24 teams were divided into six groups of four teams to play single round-robin matches in six centralised venues. The group winners and the best five runners-up across all groups qualified for the Asian Cup, where they were joined by China and the twelve teams which qualified directly from the second round.

On 17 February 2022, the AFC announced the six countries that would be hosting the third round: India, Kuwait, Kyrgyzstan, Malaysia, Mongolia and Uzbekistan.

== Qualified teams ==
Teams qualified
Group	Runners-up (bottom 3) (Note: Since Qatar qualified for the Asian Cup as second round group winner, the fifth runner-up also qualified for the third round of AFC qualification for the World Cup, while the three bottom-ranked runners-up competed in the third round of the 2023 AFC Asian Cup qualification.)	Third place	Fourth place	Fifth place (best 3)	Play-off round
A	—	Philippines	Maldives	—	—
B	Kuwait	Jordan	Nepal	—	—
C	—	Bahrain	Hong Kong	—	Cambodia
D	Uzbekistan	Palestine	Singapore	Yemen	—
E	—	India	Afghanistan	Bangladesh	—
F	Tajikistan	Kyrgyzstan	Mongolia	Myanmar	—
G	—	Malaysia	Thailand	—	Indonesia
H	—	Turkmenistan	Sri Lanka	—	—

== Seeding ==
The seeding was based on the FIFA World Rankings at the time of the draw on 24 February 2022. Teams from the host countries were placed in a separate pot allotted for hosts member associations (MAs), although their final group positions reflected their original draw seeding.

- Host Pot contained the teams from the host countries (group positions reflected their original draw seeding positions).
- Pot 1 contained the teams ranked 1–6 (except Uzbekistan, Kyrgyzstan and India).
- Pot 2 contained the teams ranked 7–12 (except Kuwait).
- Pot 3 contained the teams ranked 13–18 (except Malaysia).
- Pot 4 contained the teams ranked 19–24 (except Mongolia).

The 24 teams were drawn into six groups of four. Each group contained one team from the host pot and the remaining seeding pots, except for the original seeding pot of the host country. (Note: The arrangement was based upon the FIFA World Rankings of February 2022.)

The national teams which qualified are presented in bold.

	Pot 1	Pot 2	Pot 3	Pot 4
Hosts pot	1. **Uzbekistan** (85) **(H)**; 4. **Kyrgyzstan** (96) **(H)**; 6. **India** (104) **(H)**	11. Kuwait (143) **(H)**	16. **Malaysia** (154) **(H)**	22. Mongolia (184) **(H)**
Remaining teams	2. **Bahrain** (89); 3. **Jordan** (90); 5. **Palestine** (100)	7. **Thailand** (112); 8. **Tajikistan** (115); 9. Philippines (129); 10. Turkmenistan (134); 12. **Hong Kong** (148)	13. Afghanistan (150); 14. Yemen (151); 15. Myanmar (152); 17. Maldives (157); 18. **Indonesia** (160)	19. Singapore (161); 20. Nepal (167); 21. Cambodia (171); 23. Bangladesh (186); 24. Sri Lanka (204)

== Schedule ==
Matchday	Date	Original date	Matches
Matchday 1	8 June 2022	24 March 2021	2 vs 3, 1 vs 4
Matchday 2	11 June 2022	8 June 2021	3 vs 1, 4 vs 2
Matchday 3	14 June 2022	7 September 2021	3 vs 4, 1 vs 2

== Groups ==
The winner of each group (qualified directly for the final tournament).
The runner-up of each group (could qualify for the final tournament if they were among the five best runners-up). (Note: Since thirteen teams instead of twelve qualified for the finals from the second round, there were only eleven remaining slots available. Hence, the best five second placed teams out of six groups qualified for the Asian Cup finals.)

Tiebreakers

The teams were ranked according to points (3 points for a win, 1 point for a draw, 0 points for a loss). If tied on points, tiebreakers were applied in the following order (Regulations Article 7.3):

1. Points in head-to-head matches among tied teams;
2. Goal difference in head-to-head matches among tied teams;
3. Goals scored in head-to-head matches among tied teams;
4. Away goals scored in head-to-head matches among tied teams; (was not applied as the qualifiers were played in centralized venues)
5. If more than two teams were tied, and after applying criteria 1 to 3, a subset of teams was still tied, criteria 1 to 3 were reapplied exclusively to this subset of teams;
6. Goal difference in all group matches;
7. Goals scored in all group matches;
8. Penalty shoot-out if only two teams were tied and they met in the last round of the group;
9. Disciplinary points (yellow card = 1 point, red card as a result of two yellow cards = 3 points, direct red card = 3 points, yellow card followed by direct red card = 4 points);
10. Drawing of lots.

=== Group A ===
Pos	Team	Pld	W	D	L	GF	GA	GD	Pts	Qualification	Jordan	Indonesia	Kuwait	Nepal
1	Jordan	3	3	0	0	6	0	+6	9	2023 AFC Asian Cup	—	—	3–0	2–0
2	Indonesia	3	2	0	1	9	2	+7	6	2023 AFC Asian Cup	0–1	—	—	7–0
3	Kuwait (H)	3	1	0	2	5	6	−1	3		—	1–2	—	—
4	Nepal	3	0	0	3	1	13	−12	0		—	—	1–4	—

Source: AFC
(H) Hosts
8 June 2022
19:15 UTC+3

Kuwait	1–2	Indonesia
Nasser 41'	Report	Klok 44' (pen.); Irianto 46'

Jaber Al-Ahmad International Stadium, Kuwait City
Attendance: 6,100
Referee: Nasrullo Kabirov (Tajikistan)
8 June 2022
22:15 UTC+3

Jordan	2–0	Nepal
Olwan 69'; Al-Dardour 82' (pen.)	Report

Jaber Al-Ahmad International Stadium, Kuwait City
Attendance: 1,262
Referee: Chae Sang-hyeop (South Korea)

11 June 2022
19:15 UTC+3

Nepal	1–4	Kuwait
D. Gurung 90+4'	Report	Al-Rashidi 28'; Nasser 48', 70'; Al-Faneeni 73'

Jaber Al-Ahmad International Stadium, Kuwait City
Attendance: 10,360
Referee: Pranjal Banerjee (India)
11 June 2022
22:15 UTC+3

Indonesia	0–1	Jordan
	Report	Al-Naimat 48'

Jaber Al-Ahmad International Stadium, Kuwait City
Attendance: 2,410
Referee: Yaqoob Abdul Baki (Oman)

14 June 2022
19:15 UTC+3

Jordan	3–0	Kuwait
Olwan 62'; Al-Mardi 89'; Al-Rawabdeh 90+5'	Report

Jaber Al-Ahmad International Stadium, Kuwait City
Attendance: 18,170
Referee: Mohd Amirul Izwan Yaacob (Malaysia)
14 June 2022
22:15 UTC+3

Indonesia	7–0	Nepal
Dimas 6'; Witan 43', 81'; Fachruddin 54'; Saddil 55'; Baggott 80'; Marselino 90'	Report

Jaber Al-Ahmad International Stadium, Kuwait City
Attendance: 3,145
Referee: Hussein Abo Yehia (Lebanon)

=== Group B ===
Pos	Team	Pld	W	D	L	GF	GA	GD	Pts	Qualification	Palestine	Philippines	Mongolia	Yemen
1	Palestine	3	3	0	0	10	0	+10	9	2023 AFC Asian Cup	—	4–0	1–0	—
2	Philippines	3	1	1	1	1	4	−3	4		—	—	—	0–0
3	Mongolia (H)	3	1	0	2	2	2	0	3		—	0–1	—	—
4	Yemen	3	0	1	2	0	7	−7	1		0–5	—	0–2	—

Source: AFC
(H) Hosts
8 June 2022
12:30 UTC+8

Philippines	0–0	Yemen
	Report

MFF Football Centre, Ulaanbaatar
Attendance: 25
Referee: Kim Dae-yong (South Korea)
8 June 2022
17:00 UTC+8

Palestine	1–0	Mongolia
Dabbagh 85' (pen.)	Report

MFF Football Centre, Ulaanbaatar
Attendance: 1,828
Referee: Shukri Al Hanfosh (Saudi Arabia)

11 June 2022
12:30 UTC+8

Mongolia	0–1	Philippines
	Report	Holtmann 90+3'

MFF Football Centre, Ulaanbaatar
Attendance: 1,287
Referee: Chen Hsin-chuan (Chinese Taipei)
11 June 2022
17:00 UTC+8

Yemen	0–5	Palestine
	Report	Dabbagh 14'; Rashid 45+2'; Yameen 47'; Chihadeh 58'; Al-Wajih 64' (o.g.)

MFF Football Centre, Ulaanbaatar
Attendance: 21
Referee: Nazmi Nasaruddin (Malaysia)

14 June 2022
12:30 UTC+8

Palestine	4–0	Philippines
Chihadeh 31'; Seyam 42'; Yameen 55'; Abu Warda 72'	Report

MFF Football Centre, Ulaanbaatar
Attendance: 92
Referee: Mooud Bonyadifard (Iran)
14 June 2022
17:00 UTC+8

Yemen	0–2	Mongolia
	Report	G. Ganbold 8', 53'

MFF Football Centre, Ulaanbaatar
Attendance: 1,567
Referee: Dayirbek Abdildaev (Kyrgyzstan)

=== Group C ===
Pos	Team	Pld	W	D	L	GF	GA	GD	Pts	Qualification	Uzbekistan	Thailand	Maldives	Sri Lanka
1	Uzbekistan (H)	3	3	0	0	9	0	+9	9	2023 AFC Asian Cup	—	2–0	—	3–0
2	Thailand	3	2	0	1	5	2	+3	6	2023 AFC Asian Cup	—	—	3–0	—
3	Maldives	3	1	0	2	1	7	−6	3		0–4	—	—	1–0
4	Sri Lanka	3	0	0	3	0	6	−6	0		—	0–2	—	—

Source: AFC
(H) Hosts
8 June 2022
17:00 UTC+5

Thailand	3–0	Maldives
Sarach 40'; Teerasil 45+2'; Pansa 80'	Report

Markaziy Stadium, Namangan
Attendance: 1,100
Referee: Mohammad Arafah (Jordan)
8 June 2022
20:30 UTC+5

Uzbekistan	3–0	Sri Lanka
Masharipov 36'; Khamdamov 48'; Sayfiev 61'	Report

Markaziy Stadium, Namangan
Attendance: 12,400
Referee: Thoriq Alkatiri (Indonesia)

11 June 2022
17:00 UTC+5

Sri Lanka	0–2	Thailand
	Report	Thitiphan 34'; Worachit 90+5'

Markaziy Stadium, Namangan
Attendance: 570
Referee: Khaled Al-Shaqsi (Oman)
11 June 2022
20:30 UTC+5

Maldives	0–4	Uzbekistan
	Report	Shomurodov 2', 51', 80'; Urunov 86'

Markaziy Stadium, Namangan
Attendance: 9,066
Referee: Masoud Tufaylieh (Syria)

14 June 2022
17:00 UTC+5

Maldives	1–0	Sri Lanka
Mohamed 63'	Report

Markaziy Stadium, Namangan
Attendance: 920
Referee: Ali Reda (Lebanon)
14 June 2022
20:30 UTC+5

Uzbekistan	2–0	Thailand
Masharipov 8'; Turgunboev 23'	Report

Markaziy Stadium, Namangan
Attendance: 21,405
Referee: Hasan Akrami (Iran)

=== Group D ===
Pos	Team	Pld	W	D	L	GF	GA	GD	Pts	Qualification	India	Hong Kong	Afghanistan	Cambodia
1	India (H)	3	3	0	0	8	1	+7	9	2023 AFC Asian Cup	—	4–0	—	2–0
2	Hong Kong	3	2	0	1	5	5	0	6	2023 AFC Asian Cup	—	—	2–1	—
3	Afghanistan	3	0	1	2	4	6	−2	1		1–2	—	—	2–2
4	Cambodia	3	0	1	2	2	7	−5	1		—	0–3	—	—

Source: AFC
(H) Hosts
8 June 2022
17:00 UTC+5:30

Hong Kong	2–1	Afghanistan
Wong Wai 23'; Orr 27'	Report	Noor 81'

Salt Lake Stadium, Kolkata
Attendance: 1,115
Referee: Ahmed Al-Ali (Jordan)
8 June 2022
20:30 UTC+5:30

India	2–0	Cambodia
Chhetri 14' (pen.), 60'	Report

Salt Lake Stadium, Kolkata
Attendance: 26,118
Referee: Baraa Aisha (Palestine)

11 June 2022
17:00 UTC+5:30

Cambodia	0–3	Hong Kong
	Report	Orr 19'; Sun Ming Him 21'; Chan Siu Kwan 63'

Salt Lake Stadium, Kolkata
Attendance: 1,078
Referee: Yousif Saeed Hasan (Iraq)
11 June 2022
20:30 UTC+5:30

Afghanistan	1–2	India
Zu. Amiri 88'	Report	Chhetri 86'; Samad 90+1'

Salt Lake Stadium, Kolkata
Attendance: 44,216
Referee: Razlan Joffri Ali (Malaysia)

14 June 2022
17:00 UTC+5:30

Afghanistan	2–2	Cambodia
Shayesteh 16'; Zazai 35'	Report	Thiva 37'; Sokpheng 81'

Salt Lake Stadium, Kolkata
Attendance: 982
Referee: Payam Heidari (Iran)
14 June 2022
20:30 UTC+5:30

India	4–0	Hong Kong
Ali 1'; Chhetri 45+1'; M. Singh 85'; Pandita 90+3'	Report

Salt Lake Stadium, Kolkata
Attendance: 48,216
Referee: Qasim Al-Hatmi (Oman)

=== Group E ===
Pos	Team	Pld	W	D	L	GF	GA	GD	Pts	Qualification	Bahrain	Malaysia	Turkmenistan	Bangladesh
1	Bahrain	3	3	0	0	5	1	+4	9	2023 AFC Asian Cup	—	—	1–0	2–0
2	Malaysia (H)	3	2	0	1	8	4	+4	6	2023 AFC Asian Cup	1–2	—	—	4–1
3	Turkmenistan	3	1	0	2	3	5	−2	3		—	1–3	—	—
4	Bangladesh	3	0	0	3	2	8	−6	0		—	—	1–2	—

Source: AFC
(H) Hosts
8 June 2022
17:15 UTC+8

Bahrain	2–0	Bangladesh
Haram 34'; Al-Aswad 42'	Report

Bukit Jalil National Stadium, Kuala Lumpur
Attendance: 826
Referee: Tejas Nagvenkar (India)
8 June 2022
21:00 UTC+8

Turkmenistan	1–3	Malaysia
Annadurdyýew 37'	Report	Safawi 11'; Faisal 16'; Corbin-Ong 45+2'

Bukit Jalil National Stadium, Kuala Lumpur
Attendance: 21,591
Referee: Omar Al-Yaqoubi (Oman)

11 June 2022
17:15 UTC+8

Bangladesh	1–2	Turkmenistan
Ibrahim 12'	Report	Annadurdyýew 7'; Amanow 77'

Bukit Jalil National Stadium, Kuala Lumpur
Attendance: 5,598
Referee: Clifford Daypuyat (Philippines)
11 June 2022
21:00 UTC+8

Malaysia	1–2	Bahrain
Sumareh 55'	Report	Haram 57'; Helal 81' (pen.)

Bukit Jalil National Stadium, Kuala Lumpur
Attendance: 63,925
Referee: Sadullo Gulmurodi (Tajikistan)

14 June 2022
17:15 UTC+8

Bahrain	1–0	Turkmenistan
Helal 23' (pen.)	Report

Bukit Jalil National Stadium, Kuala Lumpur
Attendance: 2,970
Referee: Nivon Robesh Gamini (Sri Lanka)
14 June 2022
21:00 UTC+8

Malaysia	4–1	Bangladesh
Safawi 16' (pen.); Cools 38'; Syafiq 47'; D. Lok 73'	Report	Ibrahim 31'

Bukit Jalil National Stadium, Kuala Lumpur
Attendance: 52,964
Referee: Zaid Thamer Mohammed (Iraq)

=== Group F ===
Pos	Team	Pld	W	D	L	GF	GA	GD	Pts	Qualification	Tajikistan	Kyrgyzstan	Singapore	Myanmar
1	Tajikistan	3	2	1	0	5	0	+5	7	2023 AFC Asian Cup	—	—	—	4–0
2	Kyrgyzstan (H)	3	2	1	0	4	1	+3	7	2023 AFC Asian Cup	0–0	—	2–1	—
3	Singapore	3	1	0	2	7	5	+2	3		0–1	—	—	—
4	Myanmar	3	0	0	3	2	12	−10	0		—	0–2	2–6	—

Source: AFC
(H) Hosts
8 June 2022
16:30 UTC+6

Tajikistan	4–0	Myanmar
Mabatshoev 9', 57'; Dzhalilov 56' (pen.); Panjshanbe 84'	Report

Dolen Omurzakov Stadium, Bishkek
Attendance: 50
Referee: Ammar Mahfoodh (Bahrain)
8 June 2022
21:00 UTC+6

Kyrgyzstan	2–1	Singapore
Kichin 77' (pen.); Maier 82'	Report	Song Ui-young 57'

Dolen Omurzakov Stadium, Bishkek
Attendance: 7,322
Referee: Feras Taweel (Syria)

11 June 2022
16:30 UTC+6

Singapore	0–1	Tajikistan
	Report	Mabatshoev 53'

Dolen Omurzakov Stadium, Bishkek
Attendance: 84
Referee: Mohammad Ghabayen (Jordan)
11 June 2022
21:00 UTC+6

Myanmar	0–2	Kyrgyzstan
	Report	Maier 25', 45'

Dolen Omurzakov Stadium, Bishkek
Attendance: 7,522
Referee: Rowan Arumughan (India)

14 June 2022
16:30 UTC+6

Myanmar	2–6	Singapore
Win Naing Tun 53'; Aung Kaung Mann 66'	Report	Ikhsan 9', 54', 69'; Song Ui-young 16'; G. Quak 42'; Hafiz 89'

Dolen Omurzakov Stadium, Bishkek
Attendance: 0
Referee: Bijan Heydari (Iran)
14 June 2022
21:00 UTC+6

Kyrgyzstan	0–0	Tajikistan
	Report

Dolen Omurzakov Stadium, Bishkek
Attendance: 17,340
Referee: Ko Hyung-jin (South Korea)

=== Ranking of runner-up teams ===
Pos	Grp	Team	Pld	W	D	L	GF	GA	GD	Pts	Qualification
1	F	Kyrgyzstan	3	2	1	0	4	1	+3	7	2023 AFC Asian Cup
2	A	Indonesia	3	2	0	1	9	2	+7	6	2023 AFC Asian Cup
3	E	Malaysia	3	2	0	1	8	4	+4	6	2023 AFC Asian Cup
4	C	Thailand	3	2	0	1	5	2	+3	6	2023 AFC Asian Cup
5	D	Hong Kong	3	2	0	1	5	5	0	6	2023 AFC Asian Cup
6	B	Philippines	3	1	1	1	1	4	−3	4	

Source: AFC
Rules for classification: Tiebreakers

== Goalscorers ==
There were 104 goals scored in 36 matches, for an average of 2.89 goals per match.

4 goals

- (India) Sunil Chhetri

3 goals

- (Kuwait) Yousef Nasser
- (Kyrgyzstan) Viktor Maier
- (Singapore) Ikhsan Fandi
- (Tajikistan) Shervoni Mabatshoev
- (Uzbekistan) Eldor Shomurodov

2 goals

- (Bahrain) Ali Haram
- (Bahrain) Abdulla Yusuf Helal
- (Bangladesh) Mohammad Ibrahim
- (Hong Kong) Matt Orr
- (Indonesia) Witan Sulaeman
- (Jordan) Ali Olwan
- (Malaysia) Safawi Rasid
- (Mongolia) Ganbayar Ganbold
- (Palestine) Saleh Chihadeh
- (Palestine) Oday Dabbagh
- (Palestine) Mohammed Yameen
- (Singapore) Song Ui-young
- (Turkmenistan) Altymyrat Annadurdyýew
- (Uzbekistan) Jaloliddin Masharipov

1 goal

- (Afghanistan) Zubayr Amiri
- (Afghanistan) Farshad Noor
- (Afghanistan) Faysal Shayesteh
- (Afghanistan) Mustafa Zazai
- (Bahrain) Kamil Al-Aswad
- (Cambodia) Brak Thiva
- (Cambodia) Keo Sokpheng
- (Hong Kong) Chan Siu Kwan
- (Hong Kong) Sun Ming Him
- (Hong Kong) Wong Wai
- (India) Anwar Ali
- (India) Ishan Pandita
- (India) Sahal Abdul Samad
- (India) Manvir Singh
- (Indonesia) Elkan Baggott
- (Indonesia) Dimas Drajad
- (Indonesia) Fachruddin Aryanto
- (Indonesia) Marselino Ferdinan
- (Indonesia) Marc Klok
- (Indonesia) Rachmat Irianto
- (Indonesia) Saddil Ramdani
- (Jordan) Hamza Al-Dardour
- (Jordan) Mahmoud Al-Mardi
- (Jordan) Yazan Al-Naimat
- (Jordan) Noor Al-Rawabdeh
- (Kuwait) Mobarak Al-Faneeni
- (Kuwait) Fahad Al-Rashidi
- (Kyrgyzstan) Valery Kichin
- (Malaysia) Dion Cools
- (Malaysia) La'Vere Corbin-Ong
- (Malaysia) Faisal Halim
- (Malaysia) Darren Lok
- (Malaysia) Mohamadou Sumareh
- (Malaysia) Syafiq Ahmad
- (Maldives) Hamza Mohamed
- (Myanmar) Aung Kaung Mann
- (Myanmar) Win Naing Tun
- (Nepal) Darshan Gurung
- (Palestine) Mahmoud Abu Warda
- (Palestine) Mohammed Rashid
- (Palestine) Tamer Seyam
- (Philippines) Gerrit Holtmann
- (Singapore) Hafiz Nor
- (Singapore) Gabriel Quak
- (Tajikistan) Manuchekhr Dzhalilov
- (Tajikistan) Ehson Panjshanbe
- (Thailand) Teerasil Dangda
- (Thailand) Pansa Hemviboon
- (Thailand) Worachit Kanitsribampen
- (Thailand) Thitiphan Puangchan
- (Thailand) Sarach Yooyen
- (Turkmenistan) Arslanmyrat Amanow
- (Uzbekistan) Dostonbek Khamdamov
- (Uzbekistan) Farrukh Sayfiev
- (Uzbekistan) Azizbek Turgunboev
- (Uzbekistan) Oston Urunov

1 own goal

- (Yemen) Ahmed Al-Wajih (against Palestine)

== See also ==
- 2022 FIFA World Cup qualification – AFC third round
- 2022 FIFA World Cup qualification – AFC fourth round
- 2023 AFC Asian Cup qualification
