= Keo Sokpheng =

Cambodian footballer

Keo Sokpheng កែវ សុខផេង
Personal information
- Full name: Keo Sokpheng
- Date of birth: 3 March 1992 (age 34)
- Place of birth: Kratié Province, State of Cambodia
- Height: 1.70 m (5 ft 7 in)
- Positions: Forward; winger

Senior career*
Years	Team	Apps	(Gls)
2012–2015	Boeung Ket Angkor	37	(21)
2015–2017	Phnom Penh Crown	51	(27)
2018	PKNP	4	(1)
2018–2023	Visakha	94	(51)

International career^{‡}
2015	Cambodia U-23	6	(3)
2015–2023	Cambodia	62	(15)
Khmer name
Khmer	កែវ សុខផេង
Romanization	Kêv Sŏkh Phéng
IPA	[kaew sok.pʰeːŋ]
- * Club domestic league appearances and goals as of 11 February 2018 ‡ National team caps and goals as of 29 December 2022

Keo Sokpheng (Khmer: កែវ សុខផេង; born on 3 March 1992) is a former Cambodian footballer who last played for Visakha. He was born in Kratié in Cambodia. He played for Visakha in the Cambodian Premier League and the Cambodia national football team. Sokpheng played mainly as a forward or a winger. He is Keo Sokngon's younger brother who is a retired footballer.

== Club career ==
In June 2015 both Sokpheng and his brother Sokngon were signed by Phnom Penh Crown to play in the 2015 Cambodian League. Ironically Phnom Penh Crown's first game of the season was against the Keo brothers' former team, Boeung Ket Angkor.

Sokpheng signed for Malaysia's PKNP F.C. for one season, for the 2018 Malaysia Super League. On his league debut for the club on 1 February 2018, Sokpheng became the first Cambodian to play in the Malaysian league, and the first Cambodian to score in the league, when his goal helps his team defeat Negeri Sembilan F.A. 1–0. He was released by PKNP in May 2018, but despite rumors he rejoined Phnom Penh Crown, Sokpheng joined another C-League team, Visakha FC in June 2018.

== International career ==
Sokpheng was a member of Cambodia's squad at the 2015 Southeast Asian Games football tournament, scoring three goals in four games. Soon after he was called up to the senior side to take part in 2018 World Cup qualification, where he started in a 1–0 home defeat to Afghanistan. He scored his first international goal in a friendly match against Bhutan.

Sokpheng scored 4 goals at the 2019 Southeast Asian Games football tournament in the Philippines. He was one of the most important players contributed to the historic achievement of Cambodian football (4th place).

== Personal life ==
He was born from a Chinese-Vietnamese family, lived in Vietnam until 14 years old and was a big fan of the Vietnamese footballer Lê Công Vinh.

== Career statistics ==
=== International goals ===
As of match played 14 June 2022. Cambodia score listed first, score column indicates score after each Sokpheng goal.

International goals by date, venue, cap, opponent, score, result and competition
No.	Date	Venue	Cap	Opponent	Score	Result	Competition
1	20 August 2015	Olympic Stadium, Phnom Penh, Cambodia	2	Bhutan	2–0	2–0	Friendly
2	3 November 2015	Olympic Stadium, Phnom Penh, Cambodia	7	Brunei	4–1	6–1	Friendly
3	3 November 2015	Olympic Stadium, Phnom Penh, Cambodia	7	Brunei	5–1	6–1	Friendly
4	2 June 2016	National Stadium, Kaohsiung, Taiwan	11	Chinese Taipei	1–1	2–2	2019 AFC Asian Cup qualification
5	9 October 2016	Olympic Stadium, Phnom Penh, Cambodia	16	Sri Lanka	3–0	4–0	Friendly
6	9 October 2016	Olympic Stadium, Phnom Penh, Cambodia	16	Sri Lanka	4–0	4–0	Friendly
7	18 October 2016	Olympic Stadium, Phnom Penh, Cambodia	18	Brunei	2–0	3–0	2016 AFF Championship qualification
8	14 January 2017	Zayed Sports City Stadium, Abu Dhabi, United Arab Emirates	24	Saudi Arabia	2–3	2–7	Friendly
9	20 November 2018	Olympic Stadium, Phnom Penh, Cambodia	38	Laos	3–1	3–1	2018 AFF Championship
10	5 September 2019	Olympic Stadium, Phnom Penh, Cambodia	42	Hong Kong	1–1	1–1	2022 FIFA World Cup qualification
11	14 November 2019	Olympic Stadium, Phnom Penh, Cambodia	46	Mongolia	1–1	1–1	Friendly
12	12 October 2021	Khalifa Sports City Stadium, Isa Town, Bahrain	51	Guam	2–1	2–1	2023 AFC Asian Cup qualification
13	2 June 2022	Morodok Techo National Stadium, Phnom Penh, Cambodia	54	Timor-Leste	1–1	2–1	Friendly
14	14 June 2022	Salt Lake Stadium, Kolkata, India	57	Afghanistan	2–2	2–2	2023 AFC Asian Cup qualification
15	29 December 2022	Morodok Techo National Stadium, Phnom Penh, Cambodia	38	Brunei	3–1	5–1	2022 AFF Championship

== Honours ==
Boeung Ket Rubber Field

- C-League: 2012

Phnom Penh Crown

- C-League: 2015
