= Sokun Nisa =

Cambodian singer and actress

- សុគន្ធ និសា
- Born: Pon Sokunthea; 1 May 1983 (age 42); Kratié, People's Republic of Kampuchea
- Occupations: Singer; actress
- Musical career
- Instrument: Vocals
- Years active: 1999–present
- Labels: Rasmey Steung Sangkae (2003–2005); Spark Music (2006); Rasmey Hang Meas Production (2007–2011); Town Production (2012–2015); Rasmey Hang Meas Production (2016–present)

Sokun Nisa (Khmer: សុគន្ធ និសា, romanized: Sŏkônth Nĭsa [sokɔn nisaː]; born 1 May 1983) is a Cambodian singer and actress. In 2003, she started her career as a singer with Rasmey Steung Sangke Production. Currently she is a singer under Rasmey Hang Meas Production.

In 2017, she made her acting debut on television in a remake of the Korean drama Autumn in My Heart as Lead Actress of the series.

== Discography ==
=== Solo albums ===
Year	Album title		Vol	Production
2009	No Other ^{(LIT.)}	គ្មានអ្នកផ្សេង	394	Rasmey Hang Meas Production
2010	Little Girl		423	Rasmey Hang Meas Production
2015	Loving You Is My Karma ^{(LIT.)}	ស្រឡាញ់បងជាកម្មរបស់អូន	84	Town Production
2016	Why Leaving Me Alone If You Love Me ^{(LIT.)}	បើស្រឡាញ់ម្ដេចទុកអូនចោល	566	Rasmey Hang Meas Production
2018	Miss ^{(LIT.)}	នឹកម្ចាស់សន្យា	617	Rasmey Hang Meas Production

== Filmography ==
=== Television series ===
Year	Title		Role	Network	Remarks
2017	Autumn in My Heart	សិសិររដូវក្នុងបេះដូង	Liny	Hang Meas HDTV	Remake of Korean drama of the same title
2019	Queen of the Mansion ^{(LIT.)}	រាជិនីភូមិគ្រឹះ	Chorvy & Many	Hang Meas HDTV	

=== Music video (drama) ===
Year	Title		Role	Volume	Production	Note
2010	Just Love	ដើម្បីស្នេហ៍	Herself	HM 122	Hang Meas Production	with Nop Bayyareth and Chhorn Sovannareach
2011	Just Love 2	ដើម្បីស្នេហ៍ ២	Herself	HM 127	Hang Meas Production	with Nop Bayyareth and Chhorn Sovannareach

=== Television show ===
Year	Show Title	Network	Note
2016	Cambodian Idol (season 2)	Hang Meas HDTV	Special Performance (Final episode)
2017	The Voice Kids Cambodia (Season 1)	Hang Meas HDTV	Coach with Preap Sovath and Aok Sokunkanha

== Live performances ==
Year	Show	Production	Note
2007	Best of the Best	Rasmey Hang Meas Production	On Valentine's Day
2008	Top Music Show	Rasmey Hang Meas Production	
2009	Best of the Best	Rasmey Hang Meas Production	On Valentine's Day
2009	Top Music Show	Rasmey Hang Meas Production	
2010	Top Music Show	Rasmey Hang Meas Production	

== Awards ==
Year	Award	Category	Result	Ref.
2009	Dara Music Awards	700k Disliked song On YouTube (NO BODY)	Won	
2012	Anachak Dara	Sentimental Singer	Won	
