= Holland's Next Top Model season 8 =

Holland's Next Top Model
- Season 8
- Judges: Anouk Smulders; Dirk Kikstra; May-Britt Mobach
- No. of contestants: 13
- Winner: Loiza Lamers
- No. of episodes: 9

Release
- Original network: RTL 5
- Original release: 31 August – 26 October 2015

Season chronology
- ← Previous; Cycle 7 Next → Cycle 9

The eighth cycle of Holland's Next Top Model premiered on 31 August 2015 on RTL 5. The panel from the show's previous cycle remained unchanged. The prizes for this cycle included a modelling contract with Touché Models valued at €50,000, an online feature in the style and fashion website Amayzine.com, and a brand new car.

The winner of the competition was 20 year-old Loiza Lamers from Driel, Gelderland. Lamers is the first ever transgender winner of the Top Model franchise.

== Format changes ==
With the exception of the first two episodes, this was the first cycle of the show to be filmed entirely outside of the Netherlands. The contestants were flown to Los Angeles in episode two, and spent the remainder of the competition in the United States.

The winner of this years' wildcard competition was 19 year-old Laurie Kruitbosch from Apeldoorn. In contrast to the previous cycle's contest, the judges narrowed their selection down to the top ten applicants with the most votes from the public on the show's website.

== Cast ==
=== Contestants ===
(Ages stated are at start of contest)

Name	Age	Height	Hometown	Finish	Place
Eline Stapel	18	1.79 m (5 ft 10 1/2 in)	Wognum	Episode 1	13 (DQ)
Mandy Fiege	22	1.81 m (5 ft 11 1/2 in)	Hoorn	Episode 2	12 (quit)
Fleurine van Dalen	21	1.81 m (5 ft 11 1/2 in)	Leusden	Episode 2	11
Demi Leussink	20	1.80 m (5 ft 11 in)	Zutphen	Episode 3	10
Yara Fay Burgers	21	1.77 m (5 ft 9 1/2 in)	Arnhem	Episode 4	9
Amy van Hattem	16	1.75 m (5 ft 9 in)	Zoetermeer	Episode 5	8
Jackie Hendrix	20	1.80 m (5 ft 11 in)	Venlo	Episode 6	7
Sterre Noa Groot	19	1.82 m (5 ft 11 1/2 in)	Oostwoud	Episode 7	6–5
Laurie Kruitbosch	19	1.78 m (5 ft 10 in)	Apeldoorn	Episode 7	6–5
Celine Koningstein	19	1.80 m (5 ft 11 in)	Utrecht	Episode 9	4
Lisa Kapper	16	1.76 m (5 ft 9 1/2 in)	Ovezande	Episode 9	3
Rachel Swaab	22	1.77 m (5 ft 9 1/2 in)	Amsterdam	Episode 9	2
Loiza Lamers	20	1.83 m (6 ft 0 in)	Driel	Episode 9	1

=== Judges ===
- Anouk Smulders (host)
- Dirk Kikstra
- May-Britt Mobach

=== Other cast members ===
- Fred van Leer

== Episodes ==
No. overall	No. in season	Title	Original release date
67	1	"Episode 1"	31 August 2015
The judges made their selection for the final 12 at a mass casting, and later visited each finalist to break the good news. The models then met for the first time and received makeovers, where Eline was disqualified for refusing to cut her hair. Unbeknownst to the other contestants the winner of the wildcard contest, Laurie, was posing as one of the hairdressers. The following day the models found out that Laurie would be joining them in the competition, and also shot the show's opening sequence and promotional photos. At the end of the week Anouk Smulders visited the models with a final copy of the opening titles, and announced that the model not featured in the opening would be eliminated from the show. Amy and Yara Fay landed in the bottom two, but were both allowed to stay.: Special guests: Freek Koster, Tamara Weijenberg
68	2	"Episode 2"	7 September 2015
The models were introduced to actor Mark van Eeuwen, and had an exercise where they had to revisit painful memories. Loiza came out as transgender to mentor Fred van Leer, though the other contestants remained unaware of her story. The contestants later had a casting and runway challenge for LaDress by Simone, won by Lisa, and received a visit from cycle 2 winner Kim Feenstra. They also learned that the remainder of the competition would be taking place in Los Angeles, and took part in an underwater photo shoot. On set, Mandy decided to quit the competition after the stylists suggested that she cut her hair shorter. At elimination, Lisa was revealed to be the winner of the runway challenge. Fleurine and Rachel landed in the bottom two, and Fleurine was eliminated from the competition.: Special guests: Mark van Eeuwen, Simone van Trojen, Kim Feenstra
69	3	"Episode 3"	14 September 2015
The remaining 10 models were flown to Los Angeles and moved into their new mansion. They later had a workout session with personal trainer Jörgen de Mey at Venice Beach. Celine, Jackie, Loiza, Rachel, and Yara Fay were chosen as the best performers, and took on a boxing challenge at Amenzone Fitness where Rachel and Jackie were chosen as the winners. The two models got to shoot a campaign for DTLAcustom. The following day, the contestants had a red carpet photo shoot for Colgate at Hollywood Boulevard, wearing gowns designed by Kevin Hall. At elimination, Sterre was deemed to be the best performer, and her photo was chosen as a national advertisement for Colgate. Demi and Yara Fay landed in the bottom two, and Demi was eliminated from the competition.: Special guests: Jörgen de Mey, Tara Martin, Kevin Hall; Featured photographer: Solmaz Saberi, Sharon Mor Yosef
70	4	"Episode 4"	21 September 2015
The contestants met actress Martha Byrne at the CBS Studio Center for an acting lesson, and attended an audition with casting director Christy Dooley for a scene with Scott Clifton in The Bold and the Beautiful where Laurie was chosen as the winner. They were later taken to the Sheats–Goldstein Residence in Beverly Hills, where they were photographed with a male model in a luxurious photo shoot for Zinzi jewelry. At elimination, Sterre and Yara Fay landed in the bottom two. Sterre was given another chance, and Yara Fay became the fifth contestant to leave the competition.: Special guests: Martha Byrne, Christy Dooley, Casey Kasprzyk, Rhonda Friedman, Scott Clifton; Featured photographer: Randall Slavin
71	5	"Episode 5"	28 September 2015
The models met judge May-Britt Mobach and It girl Sonya Esman for a lesson on social media success. They then had a video diary challenge in teams, which was won by Jackie. In a dramatic turn of events, Loiza decided to come out as transgender to the judges and the remaining contestants. The models were later taken to Venice Beach for a colorful urban street style photo shoot where they were photographed in pairs wearing roller skates. At elimination, Amy, Jackie, and Sterre landed in the bottom three. Jackie and Sterre were given another chance, and Amy was eliminated from the competition.: Special guests: Sonya Esman; Featured photographer: Anaïs & Dax
72	6	"Episode 6"	5 October 2015
Lisa celebrated her 17th birthday. The models received a runway lesson, and learned that they would be taking part in a go-see challenge in groups with L.A. Models, Marco Marco, and bridal designer Mark Zunino. Rachel was chosen as the winner, and was treated to an at-home spa session. The following day the contestants were driven to Joshua Tree National Park for their photo shoot, where they were photographed by an antique camera and asked to portray different emotions. At elimination, Jackie and Lisa landed in the bottom two, and Jackie became the seventh contestant to leave the competition.: Special guests: Heinz Holba, Marco Morante, Mark Zunino, Rene Horsch; Featured photographer: Dirk Kikstra
73	7	"Episode 7"	12 October 2015
The contestants had a styling lesson which required them to create outfits based on different themes. They also attended a casting for Sav Noir, where Lisa was chosen to shoot a video campaign for the brand. The models were later driven to the Los Angeles River, and were stripped bare in a body painting photo shoot with a vintage car where they had to select their own props. At elimination, Laurie, Loiza, and Sterre landed in the bottom three. Laurie and Sterre left the competition in a double elimination, leaving Celine, Lisa, Loiza, and Rachel as the four remaining finalists.: Special guests: Edwin Haynes
74	8	"Episode 8"	19 October 2015
The episode recapped the events leading up to the final, and focused on the day-to-day lives of the four finalists as they prepared for the cycle's live finale. The show also went over footage of the finalists walking for designer Monique Collignon during Amsterdam Fashion Week.
75	9	"Episode 9"	26 October 2015
The finalists performed in a series of live runway shows alongside the previously eliminated contestants. The show also went over footage of the finalists' street-style photo shoot for Amayzine.com some weeks prior, and after the final results were shown, Celine was eliminated from the competition. Former hosts Daphne Deckers and Yfke Sturm made an appearance to walk with the three remaining finalists, after which Lisa was eliminated. The SMS voting began, and at the end of the night, Loiza was crowned as the winner.: Special guests: Daphne Deckers, Yfke Sturm; Featured photographer: Dirk Kikstra

== Results ==
Order	Episodes							
Order	1	2	3	4	5	6	7	9
1	Laurie	Demi	Laurie	Celine	Laurie	Rachel	Lisa	Loiza
2	Rachel	Yara Fay	Sterre	Amy	Celine	Laurie	Celine	Rachel
3	Sterre	Laurie	Amy	Loiza	Rachel	Loiza	Rachel	Lisa
4	Lisa	Lisa	Rachel	Laurie	Lisa	Celine	Loiza	Celine
5	Jackie	Loiza	Lisa	Lisa	Loiza	Sterre	Laurie	
6	Celine	Amy	Jackie	Jackie	Jackie	Lisa	Sterre	
7	Loiza	Celine	Celine	Rachel	Sterre	Jackie		
8	Fleurine	Jackie	Loiza	Sterre	Amy			
9	Demi	Sterre	Yara Fay	Yara Fay				
10	Mandy	Rachel	Demi					
11	Amy	Fleurine						
12	Yara Fay	Mandy						
13	Eline							

The contestant was disqualified
The contestant was part of a non-elimination bottom two
The contestant was eliminated
The contestant was immune from elimination
The contestant won the competition
