= Holland's Next Top Model season 3 =

Holland's Next Top Model
- Season 3
- Judges: Daphne Deckers; Rosalie van Breemen; Philip Riches; Karin Swerink; Mariana Verkerk
- No. of contestants: 12
- Winner: Cecile Sinclair
- No. of episodes: 9

Release
- Original network: RTL 5
- Original release: 15 October – 17 December 2007

Season chronology
- ← Previous; Cycle 2 Next → Cycle 4

The third cycle of Holland's Next Top Model premiered on 15 October 2007 on RTL 5. This was the first cycle of the series to be hosted by Dutch model Daphne Deckers, who replaced the previous host, Yfke Sturm after two cycles. All of the previous season's judges returned for the new cycle, with the exception of photographer and creative director Carli Hermès, who was replaced by photographer Philip Riches. Bastiaan van Schaik also replaced stylist Ruud van der Pijl as a mentor for the contestants.

The prizes for this cycle included a modelling contract with Modelmasters The Agency valued at €75,000, a cover feature for Glamour magazine, an advertising campaign for L'Oreal, and the opportunity to represent the Netherlands at the 2008 Ford Models Supermodel of the World contest.

The winner of the competition was 20-year-old Cecile Sinclair from Middelburg, Zeeland.

== Cast ==
=== Contestants ===
(Ages stated are at start of contest)

Contestant	Age	Height	Hometown	Finish	Place
Iris Maren Dekkers	18	1.80 m (5 ft 11 in)	Amsterdam	Episode 1	12
Cicilia Kembel	19	1.76 m (5 ft 9 1/2 in)	Rotterdam	Episode 2	11 (quit)
Shardene van den Boorn	19	1.80 m (5 ft 11 in)	Utrecht	Episode 2	10
Nana Kwakye	23	1.78 m (5 ft 10 in)	Amsterdam	Episode 3	9
Monique Berends	19	1.83 m (6 ft 0 in)	Vennep	Episode 4	8–7
Anna Jonckers	21	1.81 m (5 ft 11 1/2 in)	Rijswijk	Episode 4	8–7
Anne Nolet	20	1.81 m (5 ft 11 1/2 in)	The Hague	Episode 5	6
Lilly Naarden	22	1.78 m (5 ft 10 in)	Amsterdam	Episode 6	5
Sophie Deahl	18	1.74 m (5 ft 8 1/2 in)	Leiden	Episode 7	4
Carmen Klaassen	20	1.78 m (5 ft 10 in)	Harderwijk	Episode 9	3
Kassandra Schreuder	21	1.77 m (5 ft 9 1/2 in)	Leiden	Episode 9	2
Cecile Sinclair	20	1.73 m (5 ft 8 in)	Middelburg	Episode 9	1

=== Judges ===
- Daphne Deckers (host)
- Rosalie van Breemen
- Philip Riches
- Karin Swerink
- Mariana Verkerk

=== Other cast members ===
- Hildo Groen
- Bastiaan van Schaik

== Episodes ==
No. overall	No. in season	Title	Original release date
19	1	"Episode 1"	15 October 2007
The 100 semi-finalists attended casting week, and the judges chose the final 12 contestants. The finalists later moved into the model home, and had their promotional photos taken. At the end of the episode, Iris was eliminated from the competition.
20	2	"Episode 2"	22 October 2007
The contestants received makeovers, and Cicilia decided to quit the competition. The remaining 10 models later shot a campaign for luxury watches, and at elimination, Shardene was eliminated from the competition.
21	3	"Episode 3"	29 October 2007
Anna and Lilly won the week's reward challenges. The models took part in an extreme bungee jumping photo shoot where they were suspended upside down. At elimination, Monique and Nana landed in the bottom two. Monique was given a second chance, and Nana became the fourth contestant to leave the competition.
22	4	"Episode 4"	5 November 2007
The models shot a campaign featuring roller skating streetwear, and had their polaroids taken by judge and photographer Philip Riches. Sophie won the week's reward challenge, and at elimination, Anna and Monique were asked to leave the competition.
23	5	"Episode 5"	12 November 2007
Cecile and Kassandra won the week's reward challenges. The remaining six contestants shot a commercial for L'Oreal, and were later photographed in a steamy photo shoot with a male model. At the end of episode, Anne was eliminated from the competition. Host Daphne Deckers revealed that the remainder of the competition would be taking place in São Paulo, Brazil.
24	6	"Episode 6"	19 November 2007
The models arrived in Brazil, and had a rooftop swimwear photo shoot with a helicopter. At elimination, Carmen and Lilly landed in the bottom two. Carmen was saved, and Lilly became the eighth contestant to leave the competition.
25	7	"Episode 7"	26 November 2007
Karmen won the week's reward challenge, and the remaining four contestants had a nude photo shoot on the beach. At the end of the episode, Sophie was eliminated from the competition, leaving Carmen, Cecile, and Kassandra as the three remaining finalists.
26	8	"Episode 8"	3 December 2007
This episode focused on the day-to-day lives of the four finalists as they were visited by the judges and prepared for the cycle's live finale. The voting lines for each of the four models opened during this episode, and remained open until the following week.
27	9	"Episode 9"	17 December 2007
The contestants performed in a series of live challenges, and the show went over footage of the models performing in a photo shoot for the cover of Glamour magazine. At the end of the night, the judges scored the remaining models on a scale from one to ten, and after adding the public vote to the judge's vote, Cecile was revealed to be the winner of the competition.

== Results ==
Order	Episodes								
Order	1 (Note: In episode 1, the pool of 100 semi-finalists was reduced to the final 12 contestants. Iris was eliminated at the end of the episode.)		2 (Note: In episode 2, Cicilia refused her makeover and quit the competition.)	3	4 (Note: In episode 4, the contestants were called forward in pairs and told their verdict.)	5	6	7	9 (Note: During the live final, each of the judges was allowed to vote for one of the three remaining models. The weight of each individual vote was ten points, with a possible total of 50 points. These totals were then tallied with the percentages of the viewer vote among the remaining three contestants, which counted for half of the overall total. Cecile accumulated the most points at the end of the night, and was crowned the winner.)
1	Nana	Anna; Anne; Carmen; Cecile; Cicilia; Kassandra; Lilly; Monique; Nana; Shardene; Sophie	Cecile	Lilly	Lilly; Sophie	Lilly	Kassandra	Kassandra	Cecile
2	Iris	Anna; Anne; Carmen; Cecile; Cicilia; Kassandra; Lilly; Monique; Nana; Shardene; Sophie	Sophie	Sophie	Lilly; Sophie	Carmen	Sophie	Cecile	Kassandra
3	Cicilia	Anna; Anne; Carmen; Cecile; Cicilia; Kassandra; Lilly; Monique; Nana; Shardene; Sophie	Carmen	Carmen	Cecile; Kassandra	Cecile	Cecile	Carmen	Carmen
4	Carmen	Anna; Anne; Carmen; Cecile; Cicilia; Kassandra; Lilly; Monique; Nana; Shardene; Sophie	Kassandra	Kassandra	Cecile; Kassandra	Sophie	Carmen	Sophie	
5	Kassandra	Anna; Anne; Carmen; Cecile; Cicilia; Kassandra; Lilly; Monique; Nana; Shardene; Sophie	Lilly	Cecile	Anna; Monique	Kassandra	Lilly		
6	Monique	Anna; Anne; Carmen; Cecile; Cicilia; Kassandra; Lilly; Monique; Nana; Shardene; Sophie	Anna	Anna	Anna; Monique	Anne			
7	Anna	Anna; Anne; Carmen; Cecile; Cicilia; Kassandra; Lilly; Monique; Nana; Shardene; Sophie	Monique	Anne	Anne; Carmen				
8	Sophie	Anna; Anne; Carmen; Cecile; Cicilia; Kassandra; Lilly; Monique; Nana; Shardene; Sophie	Anne	Monique	Anne; Carmen				
9	Cecile	Anna; Anne; Carmen; Cecile; Cicilia; Kassandra; Lilly; Monique; Nana; Shardene; Sophie	Nana	Nana					
10	Lilly	Anna; Anne; Carmen; Cecile; Cicilia; Kassandra; Lilly; Monique; Nana; Shardene; Sophie	Shardene						
11	Anne	Anna; Anne; Carmen; Cecile; Cicilia; Kassandra; Lilly; Monique; Nana; Shardene; Sophie	Cicilia						
12	Shardene	Iris							

The contestant was eliminated outside of judging panel
The contestant was put through collectively to the next round
The contestant quit the competition
The contestant was eliminated
The contestant won the competition

=== Final scores ===
Place	Final scores			
Place	Contestant	Judge's vote	Viewer vote	Total score
1	Cecile	30 points	35 points (70%)	65 points
2	Kassandra	20 points	12 points (24%)	32 points
3	Carmen	0 points	3 points (6%)	3 points
