= Holland's Next Top Model season 11 =

Holland's Next Top Model
- Season 11
- Judges: Anna Nooshin; Nigel Barker; Kim Feenstra; JeanPaul Paula
- No. of contestants: 11
- Winner: Soufyan Ghini
- No. of episodes: 9

Release
- Original network: RTL 5
- Original release: 3 September – 29 October 2018

Season chronology
- ← Previous; Cycle 10 Next → Season 12

The eleventh cycle of Holland's Next Top Model premiered on 3 September 2018 on RTL 5. Anna Nooshin is again the show's host. The panel of judges was again composed of cycle 2 winner Kim Feenstra, photographer Nigel Barker and stylist JeanPaul Paula.

The prizes for this cycle included a modelling contract with VDM Model Management, a fashion spread in Elle magazine, and a campaign for Colgate Max White.

On October 22, 2018 it was announced that the winner of the competition was 19 -year- old Soufyan Gnini.

== Contestants ==
(Ages stated are at start of contest)

Contestant	Age	Height	Hometown	Finish	Place
Sara Slikkeveer	19	1.78 m (5 ft 10 in)	Rotterdam	Episode 3	11 (quit)
Fee van der Meijs	17	1.84 m (6 ft 1/2 in)	Breda	Episode 3	10
Ramanda van Eyck	26	1.78 m (5 ft 10 in)	Almere	Episode 4	9
Bart van Houten	19	1.87 m (6 ft 1 1/2 in)	Amsterdam	Episode 5	8
Danilo Julliet	22	1.89 m (6 ft 2 1/2 in)	Rotterdam	Episode 5	7
Naomi Sauer	21	1.79 m (5 ft 10 1/2 in)	Andijk	Episode 6	6
Daan Sanders	18	1.88 m (6 ft 2 in)	Groessen	Episode 7	5
Tim van Riel	21	1.86 m (6 ft 1 in)	Purmerend	Episode 8	4-2
Rikkie Kolle	17	1.80 m (5 ft 11 in)	Den Helder	Episode 8	4-2
Cecilia Zevenhek	22	1.74 m (5 ft 8 1/2 in)	Heerhugowaard	Episode 8	4-2
Soufyan Gnini	19	1.80 m (5 ft 11 in)	Breda	Episode 8	1

== Episodes ==
=== Episode 1 ===
Original airdate: September 3, 2018

This was the first casting episode. Out of 80 model hopefuls the top 20 semi-finalists were chosen.

- Featured photographer: Marinke Davelaar

=== Episode 2 ===
Original airdate: September 10, 2018

This was the second casting episode. The 20 semifinalists had a shoot where they all had to style the same blouse. With only 15 frames per contestant. The top 10 was chosen, who moved into a hostel.

- Featured photographer: Jos Kottman

=== Episode 3 ===
Original airdate: September 17, 2018

- Quit: Sara Slikkeveer
- Replacement: Naomi Sauer
- Best photo: Ramanda van Eyck
- Bottom two: Danilo Julliet & Fee van der Meijs
- Eliminated: Fee van der Meijs
- Featured photographer: Feriet Tunc

=== Episode 4 ===
Original airdate: September 24, 2018

- Challenge winner: Naomi Sauer
- Best photo: Danilo Julliet
- Bottom two: Naomi Sauer & Ramanda van Eyck
- Eliminated: Ramanda van Eyck
- Featured photographer: Nigel Barker

=== Episode 5 ===
Original airdate: October 1, 2018

- Challenge winner: Cecilia Zevenhek
- Best photo: Tim van Riel
- Bottom three: Bart van Houten, Danilo Julliet & Naomi Sauer
- First eliminated: Bart van Houten
- Second eliminated: Danilo Julliet
- Featured photographer: TBA

=== Episode 6 ===
Original airdate: October 8, 2018

- Best photo: Soufyan Gnini
- Bottom two: Cecilia Zevenhek & Naomi Sauer
- Eliminated: Naomi Sauer
- Featured photographer: Jeroen Mantel

=== Episode 7 ===
Original airdate: October 15, 2018

- Best photo: Cecilia Zevenhek
- Bottom two: Daan Sanders & Soufyan Gnini
- Eliminated: Daan Sanders
- Featured photographer:

=== Episode 8 ===
Original airdate: October 22, 2018

- Final four: Cecilia Zevenhek, Rikkie Kolle, Soufyan Gnini & Tim van Riel
- Holland's Next Top Model: Soufyan Gnini
- Special Guests:

=== Episode 9 ===
Original airdate: October 29, 2018

This was the recap episode where the top 4 contestants were interviewed and had a photo shoot for Elle Netherlands.

== Results ==
Place	Model	Episodes						
Place	Model	2	3 (Note: In episode 3, Sara quit the competition after refusing her makeover. Naomi, who'd been eliminated as a semifinalist, entered the competition as her replacement.)	4	5 (Note: In episode 5, after Bart, Danilo, and Naomi re-entered the judging room, Anna immediately announced that Bart was eliminated. After Bart left the judging room, Anna immediately announced that Danilo was eliminated, sparing Naomi.)	6	7	8
1	Soufyan	SAFE	LOW	SAFE	SAFE	WIN	LOW	Winner
2-4	Cecilia	SAFE	SAFE	LOW	SAFE	LOW	WIN	OUT
2-4	Rikkie	SAFE	SAFE	SAFE	SAFE	SAFE	SAFE	OUT
2-4	Tim	SAFE	SAFE	SAFE	WIN	SAFE	SAFE	OUT
5	Daan	SAFE	SAFE	SAFE	SAFE	LOW	OUT	
6	Naomi	OUT	SAFE	LOW	LOW	OUT		
7	Danilo	SAFE	LOW	WIN	OUT			
8	Bart	SAFE	LOW	SAFE	OUT			
9	Ramanda	SAFE	WIN	OUT				
10	Fee	SAFE	OUT					
11	Sara	SAFE	QUIT					

The contestant was eliminated
The contestant quit the competition
The contestant won photo of the week
The contestant was declared safe despite receiving two or three "no's" from the judges
The contestant was in the bottom
The contestant won the competition
