= Holland's Next Top Model season 10 =

Holland's Next Top Model
- Season 10
- Judges: Anna Nooshin; Nigel Barker; Kim Feenstra; JeanPaul Paula
- No. of contestants: 12
- Winner: Montell van Leijen
- No. of episodes: 9

Release
- Original network: RTL 5
- Original release: 4 September – 30 October 2017

Season chronology
- ← Previous; Cycle 9 Next → Cycle 11

The tenth cycle of Holland's Next Top Model premiered on 4 September 2017 on RTL 5. Anouk Smulders was replaced by cycle 9 judge Anna Nooshin as the show's new host. Judges Alek Bruessing and Fred van Leer did not return for the new cycle. The new panel of judges was composed of cycle 2 winner Kim Feenstra, photographer Nigel Barker and stylist JeanPaul Paula.

The prizes for this cycle included a modelling contract with VDM Model Management, a fashion spread in Elle magazine, and a campaign for HEMA.

The winner of the competition was 19 year-old Montell van Leijen from Deventer.

== Format changes ==
This cycle introduced the participation of male contestants. Application was restricted exclusively to female contestants in prior cycles of the show. The show also saw the return of linear call-outs at elimination. The last cycle to follow the format was cycle 5 in 2011.

== Cast ==
=== Contestants ===
(Ages stated are at start of contest)

| Contestant | Age | Hometown | Finish | Place |
|---|---|---|---|---|
| Senna van Plateringen | 21 | Utrecht | Episode 2 | 12 |
| Quincy Sedney | 20 | Amsterdam | Episode 3 | 11-10 |
| Sanne Jansen | 22 | Duiven | Episode 3 | 11-10 |
| Chelsey van der Heijden | 20 | Arnhem | Episode 4 | 9 |
| Milan Carvalho | 19 | Amsterdam | Episode 5 | 8-7 |
| Daila Barneveld | 17 | Luttelgeest | Episode 5 | 8-7 |
| Jamie Traets | 18 | Roosendaal | Episode 6 | 6 |
| Bonita van Nijen | 22 | Wolvega | Episode 8 | 5 |
| Latanya Renfrum | 17 | Capelle aan den IJssel | Episode 9 | 4 |
| Sanne de Kramer | 17 | Capelle aan den IJssel | Episode 9 | 3 |
| Ritse de Jong | 17 | Balk | Episode 9 | 2 |
| Montell van Leijen | 19 | Deventer | Episode 9 | 1 |

=== Judges ===
- Anna Nooshin (host)
- Nigel Barker
- Kim Feenstra
- JeanPaul Paula

== Episodes ==
| No. overall | No. in season | Title | Original release date |
|---|---|---|---|
| 85 | 1 | "Episode 1" | 4 September 2017 |
The sixteen semi-finalists converged in Amsterdam and met the judges for the first time, before taking part in a comp-card photo shoot with judge and photographer Nigel Barker. After moving into the model home, the contestants took part in a series of mock castings for Tony Cohen, Elle, and urban menswear label Forcerepublik by Sunnery James. The models who failed to impress would be denied entry at the cycle's launch party. At the end of the week, the judges chose the final twelve contestants. Chris Driessen, Fabiola Folkers, Lohrenz Amatkasan and Veranique Scheepstra did not advance to the launch party.: Special guests: Tony Cohen, Esther Coppoolse, Edine Russel, Sunnery James; Featured photographer: Nigel Barker
| 86 | 2 | "Episode 2" | 11 September 2017 |
The contestants received makeovers, and later had a makeup tutorial challenge which was won by Quincy and Bonita. On set, the models had their promotional photos taken by photographer Feriet Tunc while wearing eclectic and bold designs. At elimination, Chelsey received best photo. Quincy and Senna landed in the bottom two, and Senna became the first contestant to leave the competition.: Special guests: Xelly Cabau van Kasbergen; Featured photographer: Feriet Tunc
| 87 | 3 | "Episode 3" | 18 September 2017 |
The models had a nutrition and fitness lesson with personal trainer Jeroen Krak, and later had a go see challenge for the statement sockwear label, Alfredo Gonzales, with designer Dennis Ebeli. Ritse was later revealed to be the winner of the challenge, earning extra frames for the upcoming photo shoot, where the models were photographed individually and in pairs wearing colorful socks for the new Alfredo Gonzales lookbook. On set, Ritse, Sanne K., Bonita, and Latanya were chosen to front the brand's new campaign. At elimination, Ritse was awarded best photo, while Milan, Quincy, and Sanne J. landed in the bottom three. Milan was given another chance, while the latter two were asked to leave the competition.: Special guests: Jeroen Krak, Dennis Ebeli, Dominique Samuel; Featured photographers: Jos Kottmann, Mark Bolk
| 88 | 4 | "Episode 4" | 25 September 2017 |
The contestants received a visit from choreographer and Waacking dancer Amber Vineyard, who coached them on personalizing and perfecting their runway walks. They were later taken to the ABE club and lounge to put their newfound knowledge to the test in front of an audience, where Latanya was deemed to be the best performer. On set, the models were styled in suits by Bonne Reijn and photographed by Wikkie Hermkens in a black and white photo shoot where they had to showcase their personalities. At elimination, Sanne received best photo. Chelsey and Milan landed in the bottom two, and Chelsey became the fourth contestant to leave the competition.: Special guests: Amber Vineyard, Bonne Reijn, Sonny Groo; Featured photographer: Wikkie Hermkens
| 89 | 5 | "Episode 5" | 2 October 2017 |
The contestants were paired off in a photo challenge for A-dam Underwear on the streets of Amsterdam, with the best performing contestant, Daila, being chosen to front a campaign for the brand. They later had a photo shoot for Zinzi jewelry where they had to perform individually and in pairs, with Kim Feenstra working as their photographer on set. At elimination, Latanya was deemed to be the best performer for the shoot, and was rewarded with a set of jewelry from the brand. No contestants were eliminated. Anna Nooshin announced that the contestants would be heading to Norway, but explained that only six contestants would be flying abroad. At the airport check-in, it was revealed Milan and Dalia would not be continuing on in the competition.: Special guests: Steven Borghouts, Bram van Leeuwen, Nicky-Bob van Beijnen, Dominique Samuel; Featured photographer: Kim Feenstra
| 90 | 6 | "Episode 6" | 9 October 2017 |
The six remaining models arrived at their hotel in Tromsø, and met Kim Feenstra for a photo lesson and challenge which required them to master their facial expressions. Sanne was chosen as the challenge winner, and was allowed to take Jamie for a spa session on board a boat. The models were later paired off in a photo shoot for Nivea on the beach with judge Nigel Barker. At elimination, Latanya received best photo. Jamie and Montell landed in the bottom two, and Jamie became the seventh contestant to leave the competition.: Special guest: Famke Jonker; Featured photographer: Nigel Barker
| 91 | 7 | "Episode 7" | 16 October 2017 |
The contestants met Anna Nooshin for a closer look at their Instagram profiles, and the image they exuded with their posts. They then had a styling and photography challenge in groups, where Ritse was chosen as the winner. For the photo shoot they were taken to the coast in Lyngen Municipality, and were photographed by Jeroen Mantel in groups in an editorial for Elle magazine. The creative director of the magazine, Esther Coppoolse, and the magazine's editor in chief, Edine Russel, were also on set to view the models as they worked. At elimination, Ritse and Montell secured their spots in the final. Bonita, Latanya, and Sanne landed in the bottom three, and Anna announced that their verdict would remain pending until the following week.: Special guests: Esther Coppoolse, Edine Russel; Featured photographer: Jeroen Mantel
| 92 | 8 | "Episode 8" | 23 October 2017 |
The final five contestants were flown back to the Netherlands, and attended a casting with former model Wendy Dubbeld at VDM Model Management, the agency with which the winner would sign a contract at the end of the competition. Models Rianne ten Haken and Sara van der Hoek coached the contestants on their runway walks in preparation for their debut at Amsterdam Fashion Week. At the end of the episode, Anna ask the 3 judges to vote for who doesn't deserve to be in the final. And with 2 votes, Bonita was eliminated from the competition.: Special guests: Wendy Dubbeld, Rianne ten Haken, Sara van der Hoek, Merel van Glabbeek, Schepers Bosman (Anne Bosman & Sanne Schepers), Liesbeth Sterkenburg, Kim Feenstra
| 93 | 9 | "Episode 9" | 30 October 2017 |
The finalists performed in a series of live runway shows accompanied by live performances from various artists alongside the previously eliminated contestants. Throughout the night, the models were updated on the lead for the SMS voting that would determine the winner of the competition. The show went over previously filmed footage of the finalists participating in a final paparazzi shoot for HEMA. Latanya received the fewest votes and became the first contestant to be eliminated. She was later followed by Sanne, and out of the two remaining finalists, Montell and Ritse, Montell was crowned as the winner.: Special guests: Kris Kross Amsterdam, Jorge Blanco

== Results ==
| Order | Episodes | | | | | | | | | |
| Order | 1 (Note: In episode 1, the pool of 16 semi-finalists was narrowed down to the top 12 contestants. The first official elimination took place in episode 2.) | 2 | 3 | 4 | 5 (Note: In episode 5, Latanya received best photo at panel. No elimination ceremony was held that week. Milan and Daila were eliminated at the airport immediately before the flight to Norway. The contestants were called forward one by one to learn whether or not they would be given a ticket on board the plane.) | 6 | 7 (Note: In episode 7, Ritse and Montell advanced to the final, while Bonita, Latanya, and Sanne K. landed in the bottom three. The elimination was postponed until the end of the following episode.) | 8 (Note: In episode 8, the judges decided to vote for who doesn't deserve to be in the final. And with 1 vote for Sanne K. and 2 votes for Bonita, Bonita was eliminated from the competition.) | 9 (Note: In episode 9, Latanya was the first contestant to be eliminated during the live finale, while the other three contestants advanced to the final round. At the end of the night, the final results were revealed in regressive order, and Montell was crowned as the winner.) | |
|---|---|---|---|---|---|---|---|---|---|---|
| 1 | Senna | Chelsey | Ritse | Sanne K. | Latanya | Latanya | Ritse | Montell; Ritse | Ritse | Montell |
| 2 | Chelsey | Ritse | Sanne K. | Latanya | Sanne K. | Sanne K. | Montell | Montell; Ritse | Montell | Ritse |
| 3 | Jamie | Sanne J. | Montell | Ritse | Bonita | Ritse | Bonita; Latanya; Sanne K. | Latanya | Sanne K. | Sanne K. |
| 4 | Quincy | Montell | Bonita | Bonita | Milan | Bonita | Bonita; Latanya; Sanne K. | Sanne K. | Latanya | |
| 5 | Montell | Latanya | Jamie | Montell | Montell | Montell | Bonita; Latanya; Sanne K. | Bonita | | |
| 6 | Sanne J. | Milan | Latanya | Jamie | Jamie | Jamie | | | | |
| 7 | Sanne K. | Daila | Chelsey | Daila | Daila | | | | | |
| 8 | Milan | Jamie | Daila | Milan | Ritse | | | | | |
| 9 | Latanya | Bonita | Milan | Chelsey | | | | | | |
| 10 | Bonita | Sanne K. | Quincy; Sanne J. | | | | | | | |
| 11 | Daila | Quincy | Quincy; Sanne J. | | | | | | | |
| 12 | Ritse | Senna | | | | | | | | |

The contestant was eliminated
The contestant was eliminated outside of judging panel
The contestant advanced to the final
The contestants were collectively put through to the next round
The contestant won the competition
