= Holland's Next Top Model season 12 =

Holland's Next Top Model
- Season 12
- Judges: Anna Nooshin; Nigel Barker; Kim Feenstra
- No. of contestants: 16
- Winner: Marcus Hansma
- Runners-up: Jay Hofstede & Silke Otten
- No. of episodes: 16

Release
- Original network: RTL 5
- Original release: 2 September – 16 December 2019

Season chronology
- ← Previous; Cycle 11 Next → Cycle 13

The twelfth cycle of Holland's Next Top Model premiered on 2 September 2019 on RTL 5. Anna Nooshin reprised the role the show's host. The panel of judges was again composed of cycle 2 winner Kim Feenstra and photographer Nigel Barker. JeanPaul Paula did not return, in his place there will be a different guest judge each week.

The winner will be on the cover ELLE Netherlands and win a contract with The Movement model agency

== Contestants ==
(Ages stated are at start of contest)

House	Contestant	Age	Height	Hometown	Finish	Place
House 1	Marnix Baas	18	1.87 m (6 ft 1 1/2 in)	Heerhugowaard	Episode 3	16-15
House 2	Joëlla Ajayi	23	1.71 m (5 ft 7 1/2 in)	Woudenberg	Episode 4	16-15
House 1	Anouk Borgman	20	1.72 m (5 ft 7 1/2 in)	Amsterdam	Episode 5	14-13
House 2	Sinio Sanchez	20	1.87 m (6 ft 1 1/2 in)	Almere	Episode 6	14-13
House 1	Samuel Verissimo	19	1.82 m (5 ft 11 1/2 in)	Strijen	Episode 7	12-11
House 1	Tenisha Ramazan	17	1.78 m (5 ft 10 in)	Oost-Souburg	Episode 7	12-11
House 2	Sam Hofman	23	1.79 m (5 ft 10 1/2 in)	Amsterdam	Episode 9	10 (quit)
House 1	Jahawir Khalifa	19	1.65 m (5 ft 5 in)	's-Hertogenbosch	Episode 9	9
House 2	Maha Eljak	19	1.73 m (5 ft 8 in)	Sneek	Episode 10	8
House 2	Nick Bonsink	21	1.86 m (6 ft 1 in)	Zwolle	Episode 11	7
House 1	Bibi Doesburg	18	1.73 m (5 ft 8 in)	Eindhoven	Episode 12	6
House 1	Benjamin van Dam	18	1.88 m (6 ft 2 in)	Zoetermeer	Episode 13	5
House 2	Lenny Kruider	20	1.75 m (5 ft 9 in)	Sommelsdijk	Episode 16	4
House 2	Jay Hofstede	20	1.86 m (6 ft 1 in)	Hoorn	Episode 16	3-2
House 2	Silke Otten	21	1.74 m (5 ft 8 1/2 in)	Rottum	Episode 16	3-2
House 1	Marcus Hansma	17	1.86 m (6 ft 1 in)	Hoogeveen	Episode 16	1

== Episodes ==
=== Episode 1 ===
Original airdate: September 2, 2019

This was the first casting episode where the top 20 will be chosen.

=== Episode 2 ===
Original airdate: September 9, 2019

This was the second casting episode. After a tough model bootcamp and the promo shoot the top 20 was narrowed down to the top 16 who, in 2 groups of 8 moved into two different model houses.

- Eliminated: Mirthe Dijksta, Jippe Lasschuijt, Jordan van der Heijden & Joy Blijd

=== Episode 3 ===
Original airdate: September 16, 2019

This episode focused on the models in modelhouse 1. The model had their make overs and did this year's promo shoot.

- First call-out: Bibi Doesburg
- Bottom two: Anouk Borgman & Marnix Baas
- Eliminated: Marnix Baas
- Featured photographers: Meis Belle Wahr & Jip Merkies
- Guest judge: Nikkie Plessen

=== Episode 4 ===
Original airdate: September 23, 2019

This week it was modelhouse 2's models turn to undergo their make overs and to do their promo shoot.

- First call-out: Jay Hofstede
- Bottom two: Joëlla Ajayi & Sam Hofman
- Eliminated: Joëlla Ajayi
- Featured photographers: Meis Belle Wahr & Jip Merkies
- Guest judge: Loiza Lamers

=== Episode 5 ===
Original airdate: September 30, 2019

- First call-out: Marcus Hansma
- Bottom two: Anouk Borgman & Benjamin van Dam
- Eliminated: Anouk Borgman
- Featured photographer: Nigel Barker
- Guest judge: Paultje Column

=== Episode 6 ===
Original airdate: October 7, 2019

- Challenge winner: Nick Bonsink
- First call-out: Jay Hofstede
- Bottom two: Silke Otten & Sinio Sanchez
- Eliminated: Sinio Sanchez
- Featured photographer: Cooper Seykens
- Guest judge: Jill Kortleve

=== Episode 7 ===
Original airdate: October 14, 2019

- Challenge winner: Bibi Doesburg
- First call-out: Marcus Hansma
- Bottom two: Sam Veri & Tenisha Ramazan
- Eliminated: Sam Veri & Tenisha Ramazan
- Featured photographer: TBA
- Guest judge: Olaf Hussein

=== Episode 8 ===
Original airdate: October 21, 2019

- First call-out: Maha Eljak
- Bottom two: Jay Hofstede & Silke Otten
- Eliminated: None
- Featured photographer: Kim Feenstra
- Guest judge: Famke Louise Meijer

=== Episode 9 ===
Original airdate: October 28, 2019

- Challenge winners: Benjamin van Dam & Silke Otten
- Quit: Sam Hofman
- First call-out: Marcus Hansma
- Bottom two: Bibi Doesburg & Jawahir Khalifa
- Eliminated: Jawahir Khalifa
- Featured photographer: Richard Monsieurs
- Guest judge: Natasja Keizer

=== Episode 10 ===
Original airdate: November 4, 2019

- First call-out: Silke Otten
- Bottom two: Bibi Doesburg & Maha Eljak
- Eliminated: Maha Eljak
- Featured photographer:
- Guest judge: Julian Jansen

=== Episode 11 ===
Original airdate: November 11, 2019

- First call-out: Lenny Kruider
- Bottom two: Marcus Hansma & Nick Bonsink
- Eliminated: Nick Bonsink
- Featured photographer: Jeroen W. Mantel
- Guest judge: Edine Russel

=== Episode 12 ===
Original airdate: November 18, 2019

- Challenge winner: Silke Otten
- First call-out: Jay Hofstede
- Bottom two: Bibi Doesburg & Silke Otten
- Eliminated: Bibi Doesburg
- Featured photographer: Kim Feenstra
- Guest judge: None

=== Episode 13 ===
Original airdate: November 25, 2019

- Challenge winner: Benjamin van Dam
- First call out: Silke Otten
- Bottom two: Benjamin van Dam & Lenny Kruider
- Eliminated: Benjamin van Dam
- Featured photographer: Nigel Barker
- Guest judge: None

=== Episode 14 ===
Original airdate: December 2, 2019

This was the recap episode. Anna sat down with the Top 10 contestant and talked about their journey throughout the competition.

=== Episode 15 ===
Original airdate: December 9, 2019

This episode the four finalists were being filmed coming home. Furthermore they had a meet & greet in Veenendaal. The next day they had their last photo shoot.

- Featured photographer: Philippe Vogelenzang

=== Episode 16 ===
Original airdate: December 16, 2019

- Final four: Jay Hofstede, Lenny Kruider, Marcus Hansma & Silke Otten
- Eliminated: Lenny Kruider
- Final three: Jay Hofstede, Marcus Hansma & Silke Otten
- Runners-up: Jay Hofstede & Silke Otten
- Holland's Next Top Model: Marcus Hansma

== Results ==
Order	Episodes													
Order	2 (Note: In episode 2, the top 16 was divided into 2 groups before learning their verdict and moved into two different modelhouses. Without them knowing about the other group.)	3	4	5	6	7	8	9 (Note: In episode 9, the 2 modelhouses merged. Furthermore Sam decided to quit the competition.)	10	11	12	13	16	
1	Anouk; Benjamin; Bibi; Jawahir; Marcus; Marnix; Samuel; Tenisha	Bibi	Jay	Marcus	Jay	Marcus	Maha	Marcus	Silke	Lenny	Jay	Silke	Jay	Marcus
2	Anouk; Benjamin; Bibi; Jawahir; Marcus; Marnix; Samuel; Tenisha	Marcus	Nick	Jawahir	Nick	Bibi	Nick	Silke	Nick	Silke	Marcus	Jay	Silke	Jay; Silke
3	Anouk; Benjamin; Bibi; Jawahir; Marcus; Marnix; Samuel; Tenisha	Benjamin	Lenny	Tenisha	Sam	Benjamin	Lenny	Nick	Jay	Jay	Lenny	Marcus	Marcus	Jay; Silke
4	Anouk; Benjamin; Bibi; Jawahir; Marcus; Marnix; Samuel; Tenisha	Tenisha	Sinio	Bibi	Lenny	Jawahir	Sam	Benjamin	Marcus	Bibi	Benjamin	Lenny	Lenny	
5	Anouk; Benjamin; Bibi; Jawahir; Marcus; Marnix; Samuel; Tenisha	Samuel	Silke	Samuel	Maha	Samuel; Tenisha	Jay; Silke	Jay	Benjamin	Benjamin	Silke	Benjamin		
6	Anouk; Benjamin; Bibi; Jawahir; Marcus; Marnix; Samuel; Tenisha	Jawahir	Maha	Benjamin	Silke	Samuel; Tenisha	Jay; Silke	Lenny	Lenny	Marcus	Bibi			
7	Anouk; Benjamin; Bibi; Jawahir; Marcus; Marnix; Samuel; Tenisha	Anouk	Sam	Anouk	Sinio			Maha	Bibi	Nick				
8	Anouk; Benjamin; Bibi; Jawahir; Marcus; Marnix; Samuel; Tenisha	Marnix	Joëlla					Bibi	Maha					
9	Sinio							Jawahir						
10	Nick							Sam						
11	Silke													
12	Joëlla													
13	Jay													
14	Maha													
15	Sam													
16	Lenny													

The contestant was eliminated
The contestant was part of a non-elimination bottom two
The contestant quit the competition
The contestant won the competition
