= Holland's Next Top Model season 1 =

Holland's Next Top Model
- Season 1
- Judges: Yfke Sturm; Rosalie van Breemen; Carli Hermès; Karin Swerink
- No. of contestants: 10
- Winner: Sanne Nijhof
- No. of episodes: 8

Release
- Original network: RTL 5
- Original release: 4 September – 23 October 2006

Season chronology
- Next → Cycle 2

The first cycle of Holland's Next Top Model premiered on 4 September 2006 on RTL 5. Model Yfke Sturm served as the show's first host, with a panel consisting of Dutch photographer and director Carli Hermès, journalist and editor Karin Swerink, and presenter Rosalie van Breemen. Makeup artist Dominique Samuel and creative director Ruud van der Peijl also served minor roles throughout this first cycle.

The prizes for this cycle included a modelling contract with Max Models valued at €50,000, a cover feature for Glamour magazine, and the opportunity to represent the Netherlands at the 2007 Ford Models Supermodel of the World contest.

The winner of the competition was 19-year-old Sanne Nijhof from Den Ham, Overijssel. Nijhof went on to win the Ford Models Supermodel of the World contest the year following her victory in Holland's Next Top Model, winning an additional US$250,000 contract with Ford Models.

== Cast ==
=== Contestants ===
(Ages stated are at start of contest)

Contestant	Age	Hometown	Finish	Place
Kathelijn Brouwers	19	Lieshout	Episode 1	10
Stefanie Kouwen	21	Warmenhuizen	Episode 2	9
Annika Elschot	18	Dordrecht	Episode 3	8
Charmayne de Bruijn	18	Bergschenhoek	Episode 4	7
Anna Marie van Vliet	21	Hillegom	Episode 5	6
Marcia Bunk	26	Amsterdam	Episode 6	5
Ovo Drenth	21	Zuidlaren	Episode 7	4
Daisy van Belzen	21	Alkmaar	Episode 8	3
Sylvia Geersen	21	Rotterdam	Episode 8	2
Sanne Nijhof	19	Den Ham	Episode 8	1

=== Judges ===
- Yfke Sturm (host)
- Rosalie van Breemen
- Carli Hermès
- Karin Swerink

=== Other cast members ===
- Ruud van der Peijl
- Dominique Samuel
- Mariana Verkerk

== Episodes ==
No. overall	No. in season	Title	Original release date
1	1	"Episode 1"	4 September 2006
The semi-finalists attended a mass-casting, after which the judges chose the final 10 contestants. The finalists moved into the model home, and later had a lingerie photo shoot for Hunkemöller with photographer Jan Francis. At elimination Charmayne and Kathelijn landed in the bottom two, with Kathelijn becoming the first contestant to leave the competition.: Special guests: Lucia Marthas, John Beerens; Featured photographer: Jan Francis
2	2	"Episode 2"	11 September 2006
The contestants received waxes, and later had to style their own clothes, hair, makeup, and accessories for a casual photo shoot at a construction site. They later received makeovers, and were taken to the Percy Irausquin lounge to meet the designer. Daisy made the best impression, and was allowed to take Anna Marie and Annika along with her to a party with Irausquin. At elimination, Stefanie and Sylvia landed in the bottom two, and Stefanie was eliminated from the competition.: Special guests: John Beerens, Percy Irausquin, Marvy Rieder, Nicolette van Dam; Featured photographer: Ray Christian
3	3	"Episode 3"	18 September 2006
Special guests: Rodney Faro, Mariana Verkerk, Jetteke van Lexmond; Featured photographer: Paul Bellaart
4	4	"Episode 4"	25 September 2006
Special guests: Mylène Kroon, Bas, Rodrigo Otazu; Featured photographer: Carli Hérmes
5	5	"Episode 5"	2 October 2006
Featured photographer: Ruud Baam
6	6	"Episode 6"	9 October 2006
Special guests: Frederique van der Wal, Katie Ford, Mac Folker, John Beerens, Mariana Verkerk; Featured photographer: Ben Watts
7	7	"Episode 7"	16 October 2006
Special guests: Gary, Nicole Miller, Richard Kirschenbaum, Michelle Lee; Featured photographer: Todd Barry
8	8	"Episode 8"	23 October 2006
Featured photographer: Carli Hérmes

== Results ==
Order	Episodes									
Order	1		2	3	4	5	6	7 (Note: In episode 7, Ovo was called forward and told she was eliminated. The remaining three contestants were put through simultaneously.)	8	
1	Annika	Anna Marie	Sanne	Ovo	Marcia	Ovo	Ovo	Ovo	Sanne	Sanne
2	Daisy	Sanne	Daisy	Charmayne	Anna Marie	Daisy	Sanne	Daisy; Sanne; Sylvia	Sylvia	Sylvia
3	Anna Marie	Marcia	Ovo	Sanne	Sylvia	Marcia	Sylvia	Daisy; Sanne; Sylvia	Daisy	
4	Sanne	Ovo	Marcia	Sylvia	Sanne	Sanne	Daisy	Daisy; Sanne; Sylvia		
5	Kathelijn	Daisy	Annika	Daisy	Daisy	Sylvia	Marcia			
6	Stefanie	Sylvia	Charmayne	Anna Marie	Ovo	Anna Marie				
7	Charmayne	Annika	Anna Marie	Marcia	Charmayne					
8	Ovo	Stefanie	Sylvia	Annika						
9	Sylvia	Charmayne	Stefanie							
10	Marcia	Kathelijn								

The contestant was eliminated
The contestant was put through collectively to the next round
The contestant won the competition
