= Holland's Next Top Model =

Dutch reality television series

- Created by: Tyra Banks
- Presented by: Yfke Sturm (1–2); Daphne Deckers (3–5); Anouk Smulders (6-9); Anna Nooshin (10-12); Loiza Lamers (13- )
- Country of origin: Netherlands
- No. of seasons: 13
- No. of episodes: 130

Production
- Running time: c. 45 minutes (c. 60 with commercials)

Original release
- Network: RTL 5 (1-12); Videoland (13)
- Release: 4 September 2006 – present

Holland's Next Top Model (often abbreviated as HNTM and previously subtitled Modelmasters: Holland's Next Top Model from 2006 to 2007, signifying the show's partnership with the agency ModelMasters of Dennis Kuperus and Tijmen Bos) is a Dutch reality television series, produced by Endemol, based on Tyra Banks' America's Next Top Model. The series began airing in November 2006 on RTL 5, and has enjoyed a fair amount of success in the years since its inception. It has been relatively effective in its mission to find new talent, most notably with discoveries like those of cycle 4 contestant and finalist Patricia van der Vliet, cycle 5 winner Tamara Weijenberg and cycle 7 runner up Sanne De Roo.

== History and background ==
Holland's Next Top Model logo used from 2006–2016

The first cycle of the show, which featured 10 contestants, was hosted by model Yfke Sturm, with a panel consisting of Dutch photographer and artistic director Carli Hermès, journalist and editor Karin Swerink, and presenter Rosalie van Breemen. The first winner of the series was 19 year-old Sanne Nijhof, who also went on to win the Ford Models Supermodel of the World contest in 2007. Daphne Deckers replaced Sturm as the host of the show in 2007.

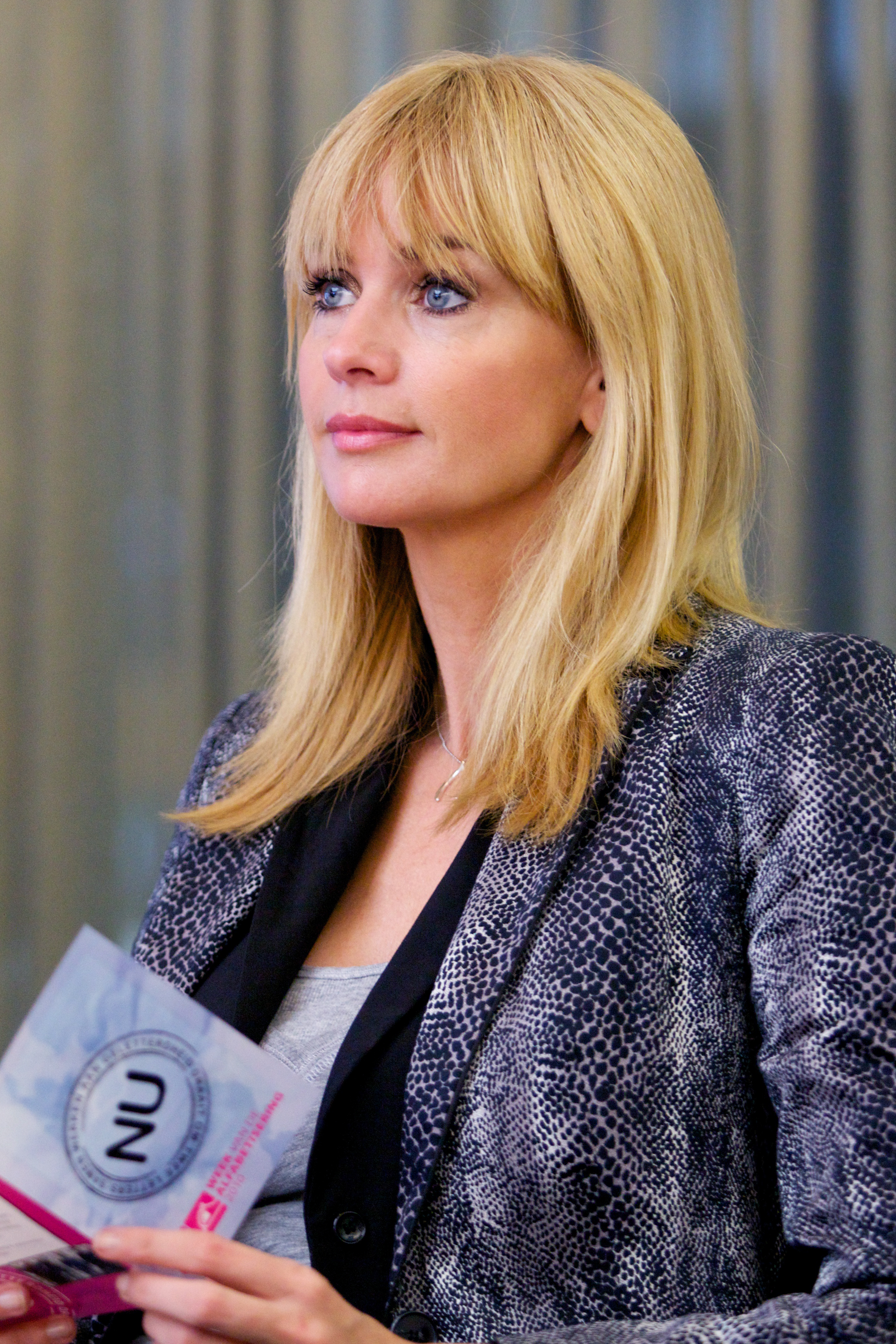
Host Daphne Deckers, pictured at a conference in 2010.

=== Benelux' Next Top Model ===
Following the conclusion of the series' fourth cycle in 2008, production began on a joint adaptation of the show with neighboring Belgium. The new show was titled Benelux' Next Top Model, but despite the Benelux reference in the title, the program was not broadcast in Luxembourg or Wallonia, and did not feature contestants from Luxembourg. After a two-season run, producers of the show abandoned the concept, opting to work on independent cycles again instead. The first cycle following the merger began airing in 2011. Three of the five panel members from the last cycle of Benelux' Next Top Model, including host Daphne Deckers, Bastiaan van Schaik, and Mariana Verkerk returned to the newly independent production, as did many other staff and crew members of the show. The two winners of Benelux' Next Top Model, Rosalinde Kikstra and Melissa Baas, were also included among the show's past winners on its official website. After a short hiatus in 2012, Anouk Smulders replaced Deckers as the host of the show.

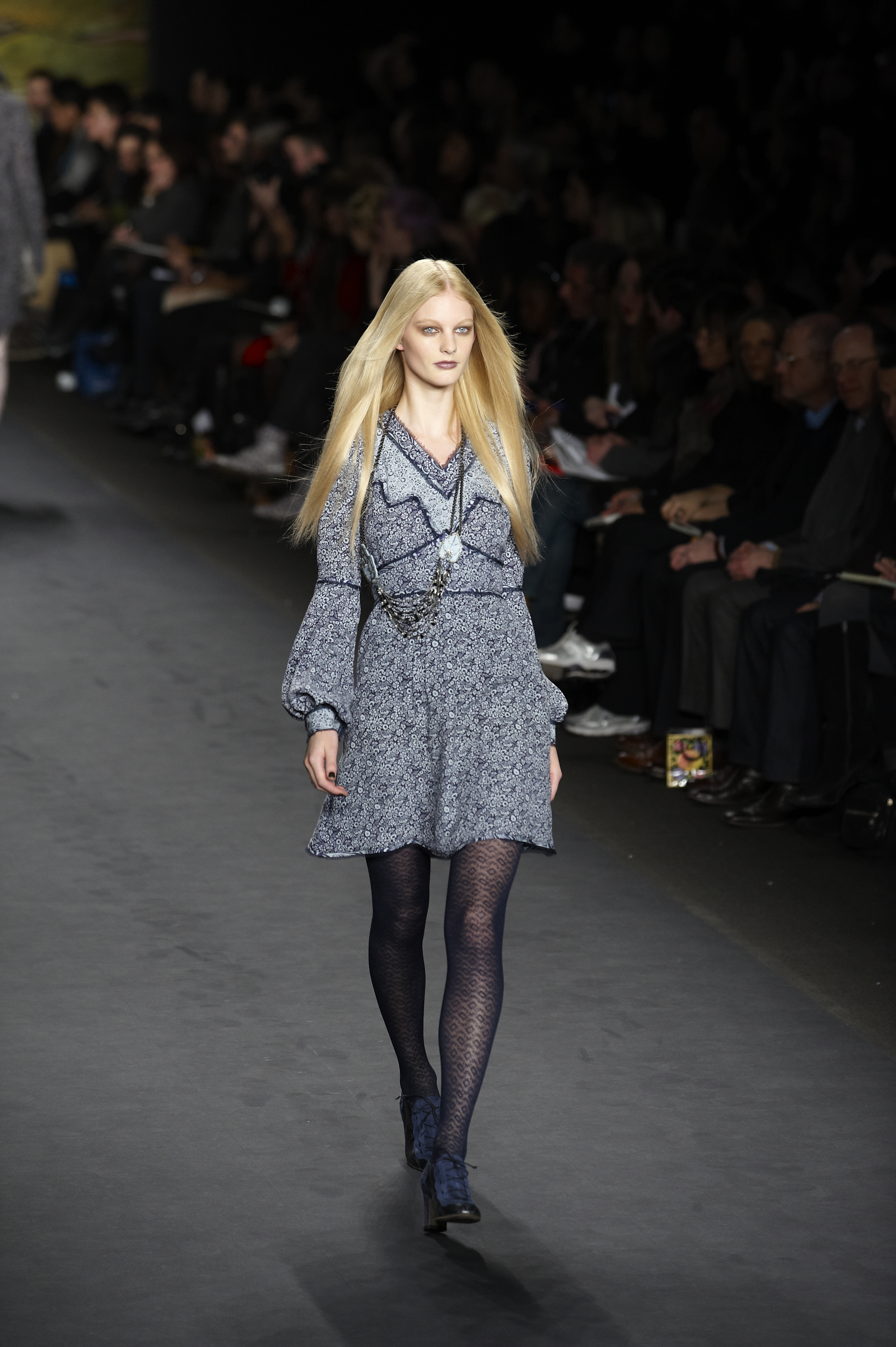
Patricia van der Vliet, pictured walking for Anna Sui's fall-winter collection in 2010, has been the show's most successful contestant to date. She was ranked 29th on the international model ranking website models.com.

=== Post BnlxNTM ===
While the series had initially followed the format of the American version of the show, it later began adding some alterations. This included the adoption of a non-linear call-out from cycles 6-9, much like that of Heidi Klum's Germany's Next Top Model, though the show has recently reverted to linear rankings during eliminations. In cycle 11, they worked with a linear judging system again where the judges could vote 'yes' or 'no'. The models with the most 'no', were in the bottom of that week. Overseas they got rid of the system.

In 2015, the show crowned the first openly transgender contestant in the history of the franchise when Loiza Lamers was chosen as the winner of the eighth cycle by the Dutch public.

In 2016, social media and public voting were important aspects. In the last 3 episodes, all the eliminations were determined by public voting during live episodes. During the live finale, the previously eliminated model with the best social media skills would make a come back in the competition. Colette Kanza who originally ended 6th came back, and ended as runner-up.

In 2017, it was announced that the show would begin allowing the participation of male contestants, becoming the 11th adaptation in the franchise to convert to a co-ed show since 2013. The current judging panel consists of fashion blogger and model Anna Nooshin, stylist JeanPaul Paula, former America's Next Top Model panelist Nigel Barker, and cycle 2 winner Kim Feenstra.

In 2019, there were 2 model houses. The models lived separately without knowing of each other's existence. After a few episodes, the 2 houses merged.

In 2022, Loiza Lamers replaced Anna Nooshin as host.

== Show format ==
Each cycle of Holland's Next Top Model consists of 8–16 episodes and begins with about 10–16 contestants. Each episode one contestant is eliminated, though there have been several cases where a double elimination takes place, or more rarely, a non-elimination by consensus of the judging panel. In most cycles of the show, the first elimination is often unceremonious, with the first eliminated contestant(s) being eliminated outside of judging panel.

Makeovers are administered to contestants early in the cycle, and at least one trip to an international destination is scheduled sometime during filming. Each episode covers roughly about one week of real time, though this varies. Episodes are divided into several segments, generally featuring a fashion challenge, photo shoot or commercial, judging, and critique of each contestant and her performance by the judging panel. Each episode is usually associated with a theme in the world of modeling, such as dealing with the press in interviews, selling a commercial product, appearing in a runway show or going on castings.

=== Challenges and photo shoots ===
Each episode usually begins with the contestants receiving training in an area concurrent with the week's theme. For example, contestants may get coached in runway walking, improvisational acting, or applying make-up to suit various occasions. A related challenge soon follows, such as a mock runway show or interview, and a winner is chosen by a judge. They receive a prize, such as clothing, a night out, or an advantage at the next photo shoot, and they are usually allowed to share the benefits with a certain number of other contestants of their choice. The next segment is a photo shoot, and each contestant's performance will reflect heavily on their judging for that week. Usually, one photo shoot per season is replaced with a commercial shoot.

=== Judging and elimination ===
The final segment of each episode is judging. Each contestant's photo is evaluated by the judging panel. After all the photos have been evaluated, the contestants leave the room as the judges deliberate. The elimination process is ceremonious, as the host hands out photos to the safe contestants one by one, in order of merit. The bottom two contestants are called forward for criticism before it is revealed which of the two has been eliminated. In later years of the show, the structure of eliminations became much less rigid, adopting instead a format similar to that of shows like Project Runway. In contrast to the American version of the show, the final episode of each cycle features the last three or four contestants competing in a live finale.

== Judges ==
Judge/Mentor	Cycle												
Judge/Mentor	1 (2006)	2 (2007)	3 (2007)	4 (2008)	5 (2011)	6 (2013)	7 (2014)	8 (2015)	9 (2016)	10 (2017)	11 (2018)	12 (2019)	13 (2022)
Hosts
Yfke Sturm	Host	Host			Guest			Guest					
Daphne Deckers			Host	Host	Host			Guest					
Anouk Smulders						Host	Host	Host	Host				
Anna Nooshin									Main	Host	Host	Host	
Loiza Lamers								Contestant				Guest	Host
Judging Panelists
Carli Hermès	Main	Main											
Karin Swering	Main	Main	Main						Guest				
Rosalie van Breemen	Main	Main	Main	Main									
Mariana Verkerk	Guest	Main	Main	Main	Main								
Philip Riches		Guest	Main	Main	Guest								
Bastiaan van Schack		Guest	Mentor	Mentor	Main								
Hilmar Mulder				Main									
Paul Berends					Main								
Fred van Leer					Mentor	Mentor	Mentor	Mentor	Main				
Sabine Geurten						Main							
Sharon Mor Yosef						Main		Guest					
Dirk Kikstra						Guest	Main	Main					
May-Britt Mobach							Main	Main					
Alek Bruessing					Guest				Main				
JeanPaul Paula										Main	Main		
Nigel Barker										Main	Main	Main	
Kim Feenstra		Contestant	Guest	Guest	Guest	Guest	Guest	Guest		Main	Main	Main	
Yolanda Hadid													Main
Philippe Vogelzang												Guest	Main
Guillaume Philibert Chin													Main

=== Guest jury member ===
In season 1, 2 and 5, the 5th spot in judging panel was taken by a guest jury member. In season 3, there was only a guest judge added in episode 5. In the first five seasons, a main judge could be replaced with the mentor or a make-up/styling coach of that season in some episodes. In season 6, 7 and 8 the 4th spot in the judging panel was also a guest.

In the twelfth season in 2019, there were several well-known guest jury members such as Famke Louise and Loiza Lamers who supported the permanent jury.

== Cycles ==
Cycle	Premiere date	Winner	Runner-up	Other contestants in order of elimination	Number of contestants	International Destinations
1	4 September 2006	Sanne Nijhof	Sylvia Geersen	Kathelijn Brouwers, Stefanie Kouwen, Annika Elschot, Charmayne de Bruijn, Anna Marie van Vliet, Marcia Bunk, Ovo Drenth, Daisy van Belzen	10	New York City
2	12 March 2007	Kim Feenstra	Christa Verboom	Gioia de Bruijn, Sharmyla de Jong, Maan Limburg & Bengü Orhan, Tanimara Teterissa, Sandra van Amstel, Loïs Hoeboer, River Hoeboer, Bodil de Jong, Sabrina van der Donk	12	Cape Town
3	15 October 2007	Cecile Sinclair	Kassandra Schreuder	Iris Maren Dekkers, Cicilia Kembel (quit), Shardene van den Boorn, Nana Kwakye, Monique Berends & Anna Jonckers, Anne Nolet, Lilly Naarden, Sophie Deahl, Carmen Klaassen	12	São Paulo
4	31 March 2008	Ananda Marchildon	Yvette Broch	Franca Nieuwenhuys & Anna Esajan, Joosje de Grave (quit), Laura Gerot, Daniëlle Marcus, Claudia Stegeman, Victoria Rerikh, Annika Schippers, Maj-Britt Zantkuijl, Patricia van der Vliet, Jennifer Melchers	13	Bangkok
5	5 September 2011	Tamara Slijkhuis	Elise Winklaar	Leontine Sijtsma, Sonja Kester, Gésanne Jongman, Jellena van Mill, Jildis Deumens (quit), Tirza Tjon Kwan Paw, Claudia van den Driest, Roxanne Wassmer, Mandy Engels, Mieke Rozeman, Nancy Halsema, Michelle Zwoferink, Riquelle Pals	15	London; Berlin; Reykjavík; Ibiza
6	26 August 2013	Nikki Steigenga	Anke Jabroer	Cheyenne van Altena, Sharon Pieksma, Rosalie Boekholt, Milou van den Bosch & Demy Ben Yanes, Soraya Schipper, Lotte Keijser, Kelsey Hendrix, Baldijntje Klip, Daelorian van der Kolk, Bo Kossen	13	Copenhagen; Milan; Como; London
7	1 September 2014	Nicky Opheij	Sanne de Roo	Quinty Henskens, Aniek Arisse, Sagal Suleiman & Roos Samwel, Allison Augustus, Holly Brood & Lincey Hegener, June Walton, Liz Lucasse, Aisha Kazumba, Debbie Dhillon	13	New York City
8	31 August 2015	Loiza Lamers	Rachel Swaab	Eline Stapel (disqualified), Mandy Fiege (quit), Fleurine van Dalen, Demi Leussink, Yara Fay Burgers, Amy Van Hattem, Jackie Hendrix, Sterre Noa Groot & Laurie Kruitbosch, Celine Koningstein, Lisa Kapper	13	Los Angeles
9	30 August 2016	Akke Marije Marinus	Colette Kanza	Nynke Bakker, Cherie Fransen (quit), Lyanne Bierings, Lena Damen, Sarah Liebregts & Arantxa Oosterwolde, Anne-Wytske Hoekstra, Denise Bon, Noor van Velzen, Emma Hagers	12	Ibiza
10	4 September 2017	Montell van Leijen	Ritse de Jong	Senna van Plateringen, Sanne Jansen & Quincy Sedney, Chelsey van der Heijden, Milan Carvalho & Daila Barneveld, Jaimie Traets, Bonita van Nijen, Latanya Renfrum, Sanne de Kramer	12	Tromsø; Lyngen
11	3 September 2018	Soufyan Gnini	Cecilia Zevenhek & Rikkie Kolle & Tim van Riel	Sara Slikkeveer (quit), Fee van der Meijs, Ramanda van Eyck, Bart van Houten & Danilo Julliet, Naomi Sauer, Daan Sanders	11	Ischgl
12	2 September 2019	Marcus Hansma	Jay Hofstede & Silke Otten	Marnix Baas, Joëlla Ayaji, Anouk Borgman, Sinio Sanchez, Tenisha Ramazan & Samuel Verissimo, Sam Hofman (quit), Jawahir Khalifa, Maha Eljak, Nick Bonsink, Bibi Doesburg, Benjamin van Dam, Lenny Kruider	16	Tbilisi
13	5 September 2022	Lando van der Schee	Jazz Ben Khalifa & Philip Cossee	Shané van den Brom & Hamdi Abdullah & Davey Janssen, Jerrold Gunther, Jamilcia Mandinga, Stijn Wanders & Folmer Boersen, Rosa van Gessel, Winson Ngoh & Lisa Fraenk, Valerie de Ruijter, Raphael Bouman, Giel van Asten, Esmee Suierveld	17	Athens
14	7 October 2024	Gitte van Elst	Fleur Muambi & Sterre de Goede	Nikki Wolfs & Julia Messing, Royano Donyea Poeketi, Melike Özçakıl, Prince Schoutissen, Jearnisa Meinders, Tobias Min-Te van Estrik, Jort Runia, Justus van Eijk, Stef Leenen & Arshea Gits	14	None

== See also ==
- Benelux' Next Top Model
