= Holland's Next Top Model season 13 =

Holland's Next Top Model
- Season 13
- Judges: Loiza Lamers; Guillame Philibert Chin; Phillippe Vogelenzang; Yolanda Hadid
- No. of contestants: 17
- No. of episodes: 12

Release
- Original network: Videoland
- Original release: 5 September 2022

Season chronology
- ← Previous; Cycle 12

The thirteenth cycle of Holland's Next Top Model premiered on 5 September 2022 on Videoland. Loiza Lamers replaced Anna Nooshin and reprised as the show's host. The panel of judges has been refreshed and is composed of Guillame Philibert Chin, Phillippe Vogelenzang, and Yolanda Hadid.

The winner of the competition was 22-year-old Lando van der Schee from Enschede. She has won a contract with The Movement Models agency and an exclusive magazine shoot in Vogue Nederland, for a fresh start to her career as a top model.

== Contestants ==
(Ages stated are at start of contest)

Contestant	Age	Height	Hometown	Finish	Place
Shané van den Brom	22	1.75 m (5 ft 9 in)	Amsterdam	Episode 1	17-15
Hamdi Abdullah	20	1.82 m (5 ft 11 1/2 in)	Breda	Episode 1	17-15
Davey Janssen	20	1.83 m (6 ft 0 in)	Amsterdam	Episode 1	17-15
Jerrold Gunther	23	1.91 m (6 ft 3 in)	Amsterdam	Episode 2	14
Jamilcia Mandinga	22	1.73 m (5 ft 8 in)	Amsterdam	Episode 3	13
Stijn Wanders	21	1.87 m (6 ft 1 1/2 in)	Leiderdorp	Episode 4	12-11
Folmer Boersen	19	1.83 m (6 ft 0 in)	Castricum	Episode 4	12-11
Rosa van Gessel	19	1.76 m (5 ft 9 1/2 in)	Amsterdam	Episode 6	10
Winson Ngoh	22	1.84 m (6 ft 1/2 in)	Dordrecht	Episode 7	9-8
Lisa Fraenk	24	1.77 m (5 ft 9 1/2 in)	Rotterdam	Episode 7	9-8
Valerie de Ruijter	22	1.78 m (5 ft 10 in)	Amsterdam	Episode 8	7
Raphael Bouman	18	1.85 m (6 ft 1 in)	Amsterdam	Episode 9	6
Giel van Asten	23	1.86 m (6 ft 1 in)	Maastricht	Episode 10	5
Esmee Suierveld	24	1.79 m (5 ft 10 1/2 in)	Hoorn	Episode 11	4
Jazzmine 'Jazz' Ben Khalifa	26	1.70 m (5 ft 7 in)	Amsterdam	Episode 12	3-2
Philip Cossee	20	1.84 m (6 ft 1/2 in)	Apeldoorn	Episode 12	3-2
Lando van der Schee	22	1.76 m (5 ft 9 1/2 in)	Enschede	Episode 12	1

== Episodes ==
=== Episode 1: Beauty is Personality ===
Original airdate: September 5, 2022

This was the first casting episode where the 13 models meet each other for the first time and the new panel judges. They start with a compcard shoot and a runway/personality teach.

- Best photo: Jamilcia Mandinga
- Eliminated: Davey Janssen & Hamdi Abdullah & Shané van de Brom
- Featured photographer: Jorien Koers
- Guests: Marcus Hansma, Phoebe de Winter, Jessica Gyasi

=== Episode 2: Beauty is Natural ===
Original airdate: September 5, 2022

The 10 remaining models had a casting at The Movement Models and Vogue Magazine. Jerrold and Lando did the best and their prize was choosing the duo's for a shoot with Phillipe Vogelenzang where all the judges were watching.

- Challenge winner: Jerrold Gunther & Lando van der Schee
- Best photo: Esmee Suierveld & Philip Cossee
- Bottom two: Jerrold Gunther & Lisa Fraenk
- Eliminated: Jerrold Gunther
- Featured photographer: Philippe Vogelenzang
- Guests: Yeliz Çiçek, Robbie Baauw, Wietske Norbart, Koen Hendriks

=== Episode 3: Beauty is Focus ===
Original airdate: September 12, 2022

Four new models join the group but they aren't welcomed, especially Lisa isn't happy with this twist. Loiza isn't happy with the stories about the arrival of the 4 new models and explains the focus is on itself and not on the other models.

- Entered the competition: Giel van Asten, Jazz Ben Khalifa, Stijn Wanders & Valerie de Ruijter
- Best photo: Jazz Ben Khalifa
- Bottom two: Jamilcia Mandinga & Rosa van Gessel
- Eliminated: Jamilcia Mandinga
- Featured photographer: Passian Smit

=== Episode 4: Beauty is Vulnerable ===
Original airdate: September 19, 2022

The models talk to a psychologist and turns out to be more sensitive than expected. They gonna need if because they also learn how important social media is, both for private and business use. They get their first high fashion shoot.

- Best photo: Esmee Suierveld & Raphael Bouman
- Bottom three: Folmer Boersen, Rosa van Gessel & Stijn Wanders
- Eliminated: Folmer Boersen & Stijn Wanders
- Featured photographer: Dion Bal

=== Episode 5: Beauty is Versatility ===
Original airdate: September 26, 2022

The models receive a workshop from top model Marjan Jonkman and she appears to have a strong opinion. The models are instructed to throw shame aside. At the end their gonna need it for a special photo shoot as a black sheep.

- Best photo: Lando van der Schee
- Bottom two: Lisa Fraenk & Valerie de Ruijter
- Eliminated: None
- Featured photographer: Lois Cohen

=== Episode 6: Beauty is Selling ===
Original airdate: October 3, 2022

The models have go-sees and notice that not everyone goes well with the different brands. The shoot takes place with judge Guillaume for his clothing brand, but as a client he turns out to be even stricter than as a judge.

- Best photo: Philip Cossee
- Bottom two: Rosa van Gessel & Valerie de Ruijter
- Eliminated: Rosa van Gessel
- Featured photographer: Mikah de Wolf

=== Episode 7: Beauty is Sin ===
Original airdate: October 10, 2022

The models are told that this is their last week in the Netherlands before they abroad, but there are nine candidates and only seven tickets. The models have to pull out all the stops to properly portray one of the seven sins.

- Best photo: Giel van Asten
- Bottom three: Lisa Fraenk, Philip Cossee & Winson Ngoh
- Eliminated: Lisa Fraenk & Winson Ngoh
- Featured photographer: Ramona Deckers

=== Episode 8: Beauty is Marble ===
Original airdate: October 17, 2022

- Best photo: Esmee Suierveld
- Bottom two: Lando van der Schee & Valerie de Ruijter
- Eliminated: Valerie de Ruijter
- Featured photographer:

== Results ==
Order	Episodes											
Order	1	2	3 (Note: Giel, Jazz, Stijn & Valerie entered the competition in Episode 3.)	4	5	6	7	8	9	10	11	12
1	Jamilcia	Esmee; Philip	Lando; Lisa; Stijn; Valerie; Winson	Jazz; Lando; Lisa; Philip	Esmee; Rosa; Winson	Philip	Giel	Esmee	Lando	Lando	Lando	Lando
2	Philip	Esmee; Philip	Lando; Lisa; Stijn; Valerie; Winson	Jazz; Lando; Lisa; Philip	Esmee; Rosa; Winson	Lando	Valerie	Philip	Philip	Philip	Philip	Philip; Jazz
3	Winson	Lando; Winson	Lando; Lisa; Stijn; Valerie; Winson	Jazz; Lando; Lisa; Philip	Esmee; Rosa; Winson	Giel	Lando	Raphael	Jazz	Jazz	Jazz	Philip; Jazz
4	Esmee	Lando; Winson	Lando; Lisa; Stijn; Valerie; Winson	Jazz; Lando; Lisa; Philip	Lando	Jazz	Raphael	Jazz	Esmee	Esmee	Esmee	
5	Folmer	Raphael; Rosa	Lando; Lisa; Stijn; Valerie; Winson	Esmee; Raphael	Raphael	Esmee	Esmee	Giel	Giel	Giel		
6	Raphael	Raphael; Rosa	Jazz	Esmee; Raphael	Philip	Raphael	Jazz	Lando	Raphael			
7	Jerrold	Folmer; Jamilcia	Raphael	Giel	Jazz	Lisa	Philip	Valerie				
8	Rosa	Folmer; Jamilcia	Esmee	Winson	Giel	Winson	Lisa; Winson					
9	Lisa	Lisa	Giel	Valerie	Lisa; Valerie	Valerie	Lisa; Winson					
10	Lando	Jerrold	Philip	Rosa	Lisa; Valerie	Rosa						
11	Davey; Hamdi; Shané		Folmer	Folmer; Stijn								
12	Davey; Hamdi; Shané		Rosa	Folmer; Stijn								
13	Davey; Hamdi; Shané		Jamilcia									

The contestants were called prior to panel, and were deemed safe
The contestant was eliminated
The contestant was part of a non-elimination bottom two
The contestant won the competition
