= Sanne Nijhof =

Dutch model (born 1987)

- Born: 20 October 1987 (age 38); Den Ham, Overijssel, The Netherlands
- Modeling information
- Height: 5 ft 10 in (1.78 m)
- Hair color: Blonde
- Eye color: Gray/Blue

Sanne Nijhof (born 20 October 1987 in Den Ham, The Netherlands) is a Dutch model.

== Early life ==
Before being a contestant in the first cycle of Holland's Next Top Model, Nijhof was at a high level of horse riding, but had to quit because she suffered from infectious mononucleosis.

== Career ==
Nijhof was named the winner of the first cycle of Holland's Next Top Model after making it to the finals with Sylvia Geertsen. Her prize was a €50,000 modeling contract with Max Models, a cover for Glamour magazine, and the right to represent the Netherlands at Ford Models Supermodel of the World competition. On 17 January 2007, she won the Ford Models Supermodel of the World competition, winning a US$250,000 contract with the world-renowned agency. However, she has since left Ford Models. She signed with Women Model Management in Paris and in Milan in October 2007. She also switched agencies in Amsterdam, where she left Max Models for Wilma Wakker Models. She has had magazine spreads in Vogue, Elle, Harpers Bazaar, Marie Claire, Tatler, Style, Figaro as well as a cover for L'Officiel magazine. She has walked in New York, Paris and Milan fashion week as well as Haute Couture fashion week in Paris and has had a campaign with Maybelline.
