= Akke Marije Marinus =

Dutch model

- Born: 4 December 1995 (age 30); Dokkum, Netherlands
- Modeling information
- Height: 1.80 m (5 ft 11 in)

Akke Marije Marinus is a Dutch model. She is the winner of the 9th season of Holland's Next Top Model.
