= Cecile Sinclair =

British-Dutch model

- Born: 21 February 1987 (age 39)
- Modelling information
- Height: 5 ft 8 in (1.73 m)
- Hair colour: Red
- Eye colour: Green
- Agency: Union Models, Touche Models, Wilhelmina Models, Fashion Model Management, Premium Models, PMA Models,

Cecile Sinclair (born 21 February 1987) is a British-Dutch model. She is best known as the winner of the third cycle of Holland's Next Top Model.

== Biography ==
Sinclair was born to a Kiwi father of English descent and Dutch mother in Manama, Bahrain. Due to her father's occupation, Sinclair has spent her childhood living in various places, including San Francisco, Hong Kong and England.

Sinclair finished the International Baccalaureate at the International school in Surrey, United Kingdom. She also attended the Roosevelt Academy in Middelburg, Netherlands.

== Modelling career ==
Sinclair's modelling career began during the second year of university, when she was scouted for a fashion show in a regional museum. In 2007, she competed in the third cycle of Holland's Next Topmodel, winning the competition. Following her victory, she earned a contract at MTA Models, the cover of Dutch Glamour Magazine, a L'oreal Paris Campaign, and 75,000 Euros.

In 2008, Sinclair was asked to compete in Ford Models Supermodel of the World Contest. She then signed with IMM Models in Brussels, Group Models in Barcelona, Silent Models in Paris. That same year, she did a campaign for Mary Katratzou.

2009 proved to be a good year for Sinclair who posed for the cover of Elle Italia as well as appeared in editorials for Flaunt Magazine, Surface Magazine, Weekend Knack, Lula, Makeup Store, Dazed & Confused. She was featured in campaigns such as Zuneta and she starred in the short film "Treasure Box" by Gemma Booth. She even participated in London Fashion Week walking for Eun Jeong, Jasmine Di Milo, Future Classics, Dean Quin and Ashish. That same year, Sinclair signed with Ford Models in New York.

In 2010, both her German agency, PMA Models, and her New York agency, Ford Models began grooming her for the Fall/Winter 2010/2011 show season. Sinclair walked for Rachel Comey, Salvor Projects, Boy by Band, Band of Outsiders, Betsey Johnson, Ecco Domani, Matthew Ames, and Nanette Lepore in New York. In London, Sinclair walked for Acne. Editorially, Sinclair was featured in Elle Italia, Dansk Magazine, PIG Magazine, and Elle Russia. Following the success of Fall/Winter 2011, Sinclair took part of the Spring/Summer 2011 season in Germany. She landed campaigns for Piazza Sempione, Baldinini, Badgley Mischka and Janet Sport.

By 2011, MTA Models merged with Elite Model Management in Amsterdam. With Elite Model Management as her mother agency, Sinclair was placed with Elite Models in Milan and Paris. That same year, Sinclair was featured in campaigns for Tesco's F&F, Mackintosh, Harrods, and D.S. Dundee. In edition, she appeared in editorials for She Magazine, Cosmopolitan UK, German Glamour Magazine, Be Magazine, and The Rake Magazine.

In 2012, Sinclair left Elite Models in Amsterdam for De Boekers. Due to her success in England, she decided to move to London and made her mother agency Union Models. Following this move, Sinclair signed with Ford Models in Paris, Fashion Model Management in Milan, Mega Models in Miami, and Elmer Olsen in Toronto. Also in 2012, she appeared in campaigns for Andrew Barton, George, H&M, Mews, New Look and Mimi Jewelry. She did editorial work for Easy Living Magazine and Brides Magazine. She also appeared on the cover of Annabelle Magazine.

In 2013, Sinclair left Ford Models in New York, Mega Models in Miami, and De Boekers in Amsterdam for Wilhelmina Models in both New York and Miami as well as Touche Models in Amsterdam. Sinclair spent most of the year in the United States appearing in several American editorials. She was also featured on the cover of Health & Beauty in England as well as appearing in Relapse Magazine and Alt for Damerne. That year, Sinclair's campaigns included Superdrug, Sensibiafine, and Lowie Knitwear.

In January 2014, Sinclair was featured in Look Magazine in the United Kingdom.

She is currently signed to Union Models in London, Wilhelmina Models New York, Wilhelmina Models Miami, Touche Models in Amsterdam, PMA Models in Hamburg, IMM Models Brussels, Group Models in Barcelona, Fashion Model Management in Milan, Premium Models in Paris, and Elmer Olsen in Toronto.

== Filmography ==
=== Film ===
Year	Title	Role	Notes
2018	The Lost Children	Person 01	Short
2019	Some Other Beach	Victoria	Short
2020	Persephone	Persephone	Short
2020	The (Un)Holy Trinity	Salome	Short
2020	Ride with the Guilt	Monica Caravan	Short
2020	Show Me The End Of Time	Cecilia	Short
2020	Fatalism	Cee	Short
2021	Coffee And Water	Lucy	Short
2023	Tell Me	Stephany	Short
2023	Losing Us	Teske	Short
2023	Dune: Part Two	Imperial Councillor 4	

=== Television ===
Year	Title	Role	Notes
2007	Holland's Next Top Model	Herself	Winner of Holland's Next Top Model (season 3)
2023	Ted Lasso	Welmoed	Episode: "Sunflowers (Ted Lasso)"
