= Loiza Lamers =

Dutch model and businesswoman

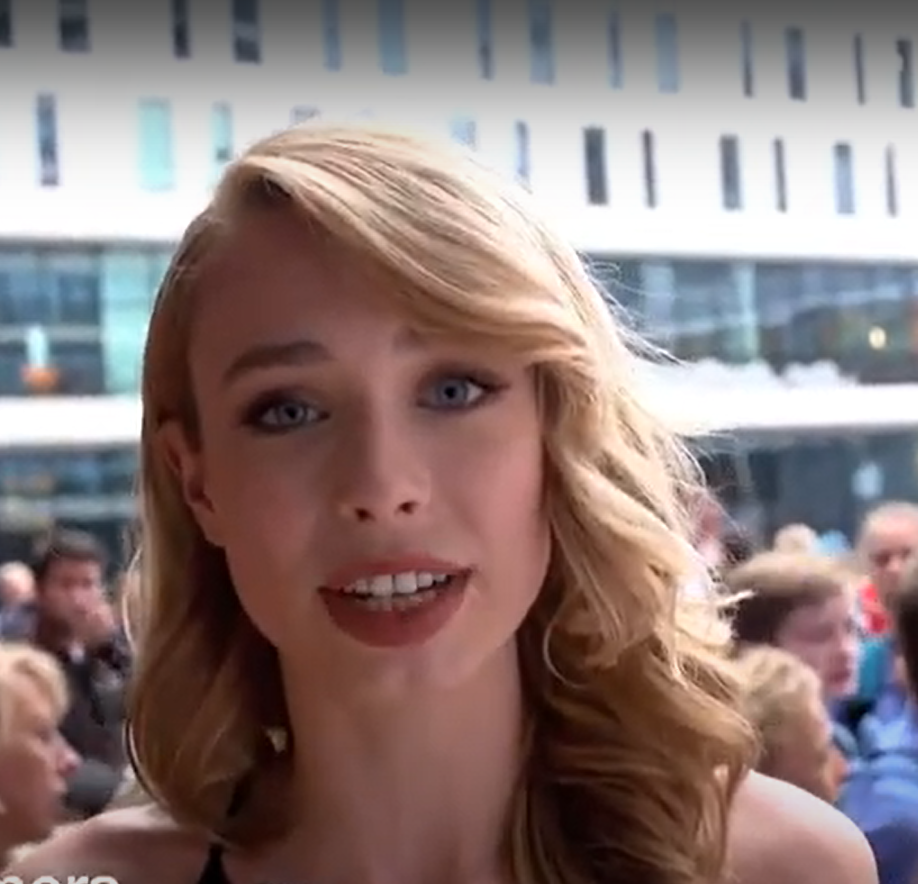
- Lamers in 2017
- Born: 9 January 1995 (age 31); Driel, Netherlands
- Occupations: Model, Businesswoman
- Years active: 2015–present
- Modeling information
- Height: 6 ft 0.5 in (184 cm)
- Hair color: Blonde
- Eye color: Blue
- Website: www.loizalamers.com

Loiza Lamers (born 9 January 1995) is a Dutch model and businesswoman best known for being the winner of the eighth cycle of Holland's Next Top Model, and the world's first transgender winner of the global Top Model TV-franchise.

== Early life ==
Lamers, a Gelderland native, was born in Driel in 1995. Lamers expressed her gender nonconformity early in life, beginning her gender transition early in her childhood. At the age of 10, Lamers was featured in a 2005 documentary by Charlotte Hoogakker titled Van Lucas naar Luus (From Lucas to Luus), which focused on her transition. Lamers underwent gender-affirming surgery at the age of 18, two years before her appearance on the Dutch adaptation of Top Model.

== Holland's Next Top Model ==
Lamers worked as a hairdresser prior to auditioning for the eighth season of Holland's Next Top Model in early 2015. She was ultimately chosen as one of the final thirteen contestants. Producers of the show were unaware of her status as a trans woman until she disclosed the information after rumors circulated on the internet.

On 26 October 2015 Lamers was voted the winner of the competition by the Dutch public in the show's live finale. Her prizes included a modelling contract valued at €50,000, which she rejected.

In 2019 Lamers was guest jury member in the twelfth season of Holland's Next Top Model.

January 2020, Lamers was confirmed to be one of the contestants on Let's Dance Germany 2020 she was eliminated in week 7 after having done Paso Doble to "Rhythm Is a Dancer", and been part of Team Gonzalez for the group dance to "Vogue" and "Push the Feeling On".

In 2022, Lamers was one of masked singers in the Dutch television program The Masked Singer, she dropped out in her mermaid costume in the sixth episode. That same year, she self-presented Holland's Next Top Model under Simone van den Ende, and in September 2023, Lamers was a guest panelist on the RTL 4 program DNA Singers. In October of the same year, she was a guest on the television program Ik hou van Holland.

== Career ==
In 2016, she starred in a modeling shoot for Diesel and About You alongside German model and trans man Benjamin Melzer.

The same year, she starred in PETA's "I'd rather go naked than wear fur" campaign alongside Melzer.

In 2021, she appeared in the first season of the television show De Verraders, where she ended up in second position. In 2022, she appeared on the Dutch edition of the television show The Masked Singer.

=== Performances in Let's Dance Germany (paired with Andrzej Cibis) ===
Week #	Song choice	Original artist	Result	
Launch Show (part of Team Cha Cha Cha)	"Evacuate The Dancefloor"	Cascada	score=5+5+5=15	no immunity
Week 1	"Born This Way"	Lady GaGa	score=6+6+4=16	Safe
Week 2	"Schon Genug"	Lina Maly	score=7+7+5=19	Safe
Week 3	"Under The Moon of Love"	Showaddywaddy	score=7+6+4=17	Bottom 2
Week 4	"Naked"	James Arthur	score=6+6+4=16	Eliminated but returned to the competition after withdrawal of John Kelly
Week 5	"Cotton Eyed Joe"	Rednex	score=9+8+7=24	Safe
Week 6	"Bang Bang (My Baby Shot Me Down)"	Nancy Sinatra	score=8+8+5=21	Safe
Week 7	"Rhythm is a Dancer"	Snap	score=9+8+6=23	
Week 8	"Vogue" & "Push the Feeling On"	Madonna & Nightcrawlers	score=8+7=15	Eliminated

=== Performances in The Masked Singer ===
Week #	Song choice	Original artist	Result
Show 1	"Yes Sir, I Can Boogie"	Baccara	Bottom 2
Show 2	"Who Do You Think You Are"	Spice Girls	Bottom 3
Show 3	"Get the Party Started"	Pink	Eliminated
