= Daphne Deckers =

Dutch host, writer and actress

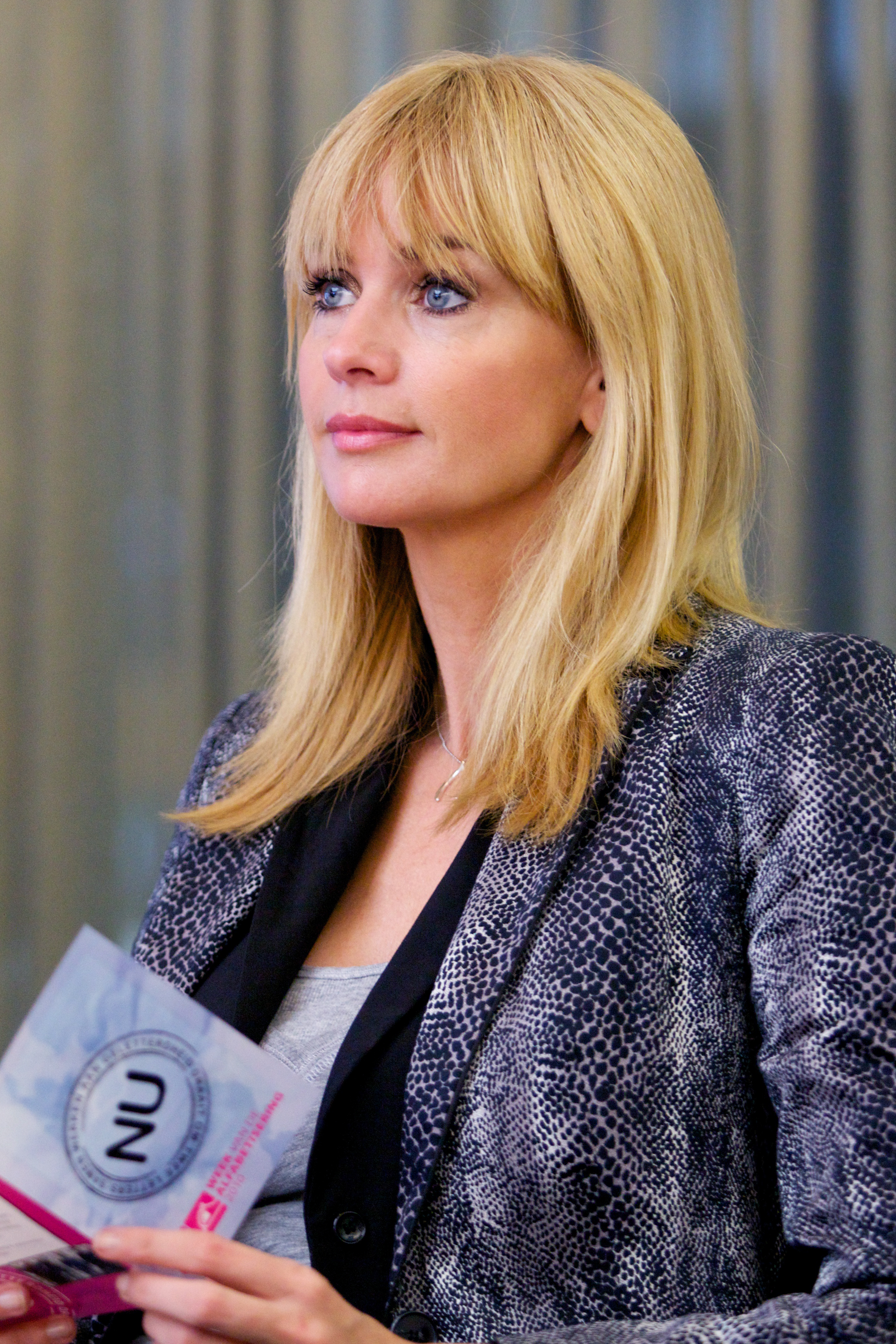
- Deckers in 2010.
- Born: Daphne Muriël Deckers; 10 November 1968 (age 57); Nijmegen, Netherlands
- Years active: 1989–present
- Spouse: Richard Krajicek (m. 1999)
- Children: 2
- Website: daphnedeckers.nl

Daphne Muriël Deckers (Nijmegen, 10 November 1968) is a Dutch television presenter, writer and occasional actress. In 1989 she started her career at RTL-Véronique, where she eventually became the host of Holland's Next Top Model, which she took over after the second season from Yfke Sturm.

Deckers began her career as a model, and later took up acting. In 1997 she appeared in the James Bond movie Tomorrow Never Dies and co-presented the first series of Big Brother. She now writes children's books and books about family life and related subjects.

== Early life ==
Soon after Deckers was born in Nijmegen, her family moved nearby to the small village of Persingen. While studying mass communications, she became a model. In 1997, she posed for Playboy and appeared in the 1998 February issue of the magazine.

== Career ==
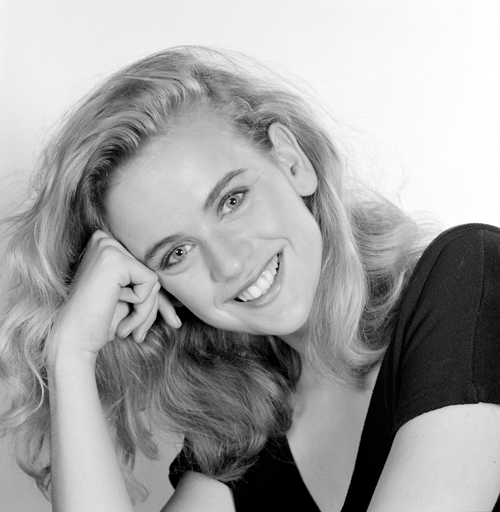
Deckers in 1989

=== Acting ===
Deckers was part of the American NBC-mini series Remember, based on Barbara Taylor Bradford's novel, where she happened to appear with another Dutch actor, Derek de Lint. She also appeared in the movie All Stars; and had a small part in the James Bond movie Tomorrow Never Dies as a PR representative of villain Elliot Carver, played by Jonathan Pryce.

=== Television ===
Deckers has also hosted multiple television shows, such as Big Brother, Reisgids, TV Woonmagazine en 101 Vrouwen. In July 2007, she began presenting her first season as a judge on Holland's Next Top Model, later called Benelux's Next Top Model. Since 2007, she has also been a fashion expert for RTL Boulevard, and in September 2012 became the permanent replacement for presenter Winston Gerschtanowitz. She currently has her own weekend television programme on 100%NL, Naakte Waarheid, which is in its second season.

=== Author ===
In 1993 Deckers wrote columns for Veronicablad. Not long after she was asked to write a weekly column for a newspaper in Limburg. At the end of 1994, she began writing a weekly column for Viva. Then in 1999, she combined all of these columns and wrote the book De Echte Deckers (1999). After the publishing of her book, she continued writing a weekly column for the De Telegraaf. She bundled these columns into two books: Opwaartse drukte (2002) and Decksels (2005). Today she continues to write a weekly column for the De Telegraaf and she also writes columns for Reader's Digest.

Deckers has published two books, which have earned her the name as 'example mother'. She published De geboorte van een moeder and De geboorte van een gezin. In 2003 her book De geboorte van een gezin was nominated for the NS Publiekprijs. Not only does Deckers write about upbringing, but she also writes children's books, such as De veschrikkelijke ijstaart, De matroos in de doos and Marijn in de woestijn. Her second children's novel was adapted into a play in 2007. In 2012 she wrote her first romance novel, Alles is zoals het zou moeten zijn. This novel was adapted to film in 2020. The film Life as It Should Be won the Golden Film award and became the third highest-grossing Dutch film of 2020.

== Personal life ==
On 7 July 1999, Deckers married tennis player Richard Krajicek. They have two children. On 21 May 2010 she won the Lifetime Achievement Award for her extensive modelling career at the Dutch Model Awards in Amsterdam. She is also an ambassador for the Nationaal Fonds Kinderhulp. In 2010 she launched her own lingerie line, TC World of Women.

== Filmography ==
Year	Title	Role	Notes
1997	All Stars	Claire	
1997	Tomorrow Never Dies	PR Lady	
