= Sabrina van der Donk =

Dutch model

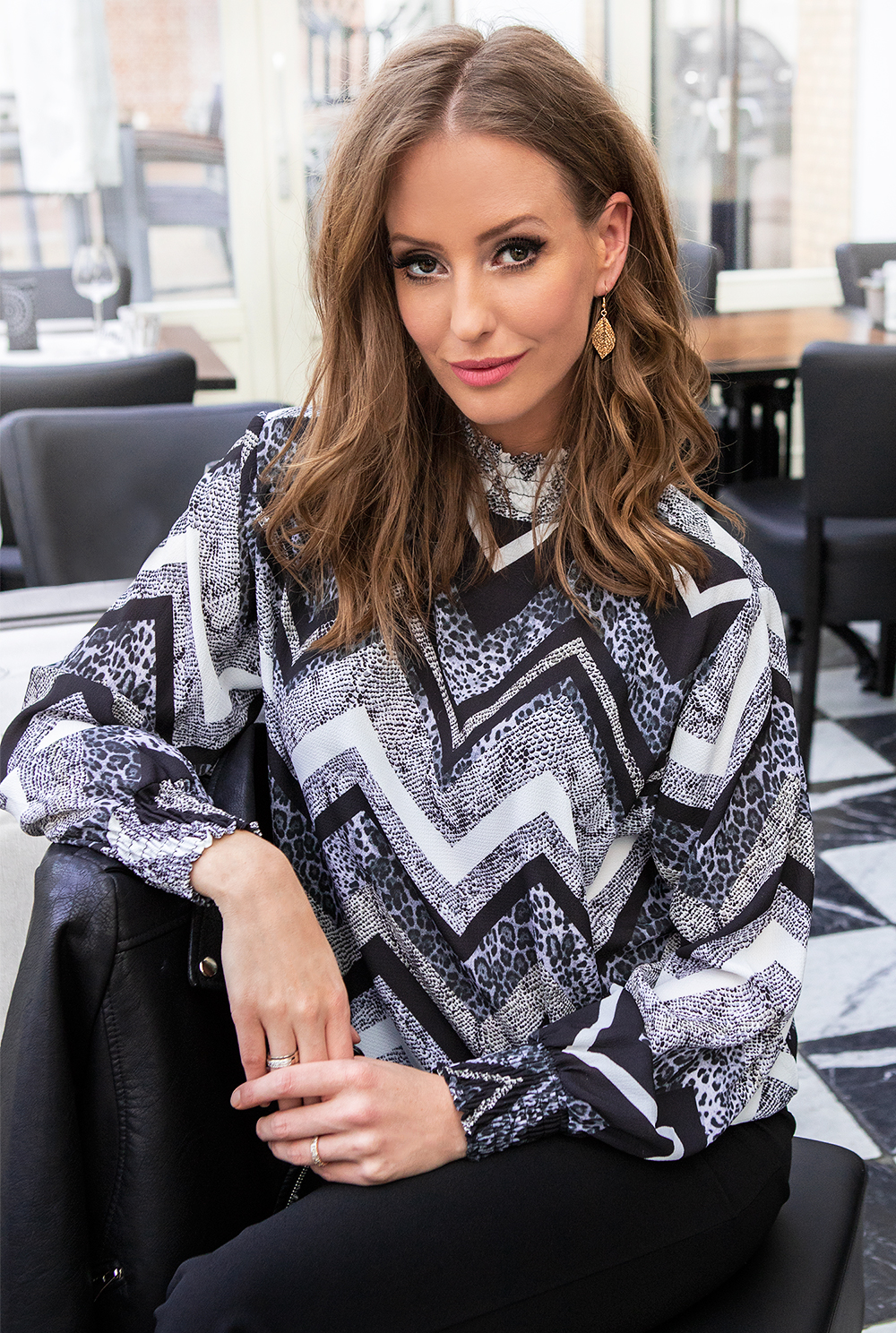
- Sabrina van der Donk in 2019
- Born: 29 July 1988 (age 38); Zeewolde, Netherlands
- Modeling information
- Height: 5 ft 10 in (1.78 m)
- Hair color: Brown
- Eye color: Brown/Green

Sabrina van der Donk (born 29 July 1988 in Zeewolde) is a Dutch model and beauty pageant titleholder who participated in the Miss Earth 2006 beauty pageant in the Philippines.

Van der Donk assumed the title of Miss Netherlands Earth 2006 after the winner, Lara Seveke, failed to perform her duties and therefore was dethroned. Van der Donk was appointed to take over the Miss Netherlands Earth title from a selection of contestants, who placed as finalists in the competition.

She also participated in Miss Kemer 2006 pageant in Turkey, where she emerged as the second runner-up.

Sabrina van der Donk was a contestant in Holland's Next Top Model, Cycle 2. She made it to the finals but did not win the contest.
