= Mark Zunino =

American fashion designer

- Born: Mark Stephen Zunino
- Education: Pepperdine University
- Occupation: Fashion designer
- Years active: 1982–present
- Website: markzunino.com

Mark Stephen Zunino is an American fashion designer.

== Early life and education ==
Mark Zunino was born in Fairfield, California. He and his family later moved to Vacaville, CA for work. He grew interested in sports following his dad's encouragement. After graduating high school, Zunino attended the University of California at Davis for a short time. He later transferred to Pepperdine University in Malibu, CA to study architecture.

== Career ==
His first entry into his career was when he was recommended for an internship with Aaron Spelling and Nolan Miller, a television producer and fashion designer respectively. Through his work with Nolan, Zunino was able to work with multiple people, such as Nancy Reagan, Elizabeth Taylor, Joan Collins, Mariah Carey, Jennifer Lopez and Britney Spears. These experiences, combined with his exposure to the couture business among others, helped inform his focus on an “old Hollywood” style. Zunino later launched a fashion line in 1998, which was designed to have more “modern” sensibilities. He later debuted the “Mark Zunino” line and accepted a partnership with Miller. The partnership lasted from 1998-2007 when it was dissolved due to Miller being diagnosed with lung cancer. Zunino relaunched it under his own name. He toured internationally from 2007–2011 in partnership with General Motors. He launched multiple fashion lines in 2011, including Mark Zunino Bridal and MZ2, which was relatively budget-priced. He opened a salon in Beverly Hills, CA in 2015.
