= Driel =

- Village
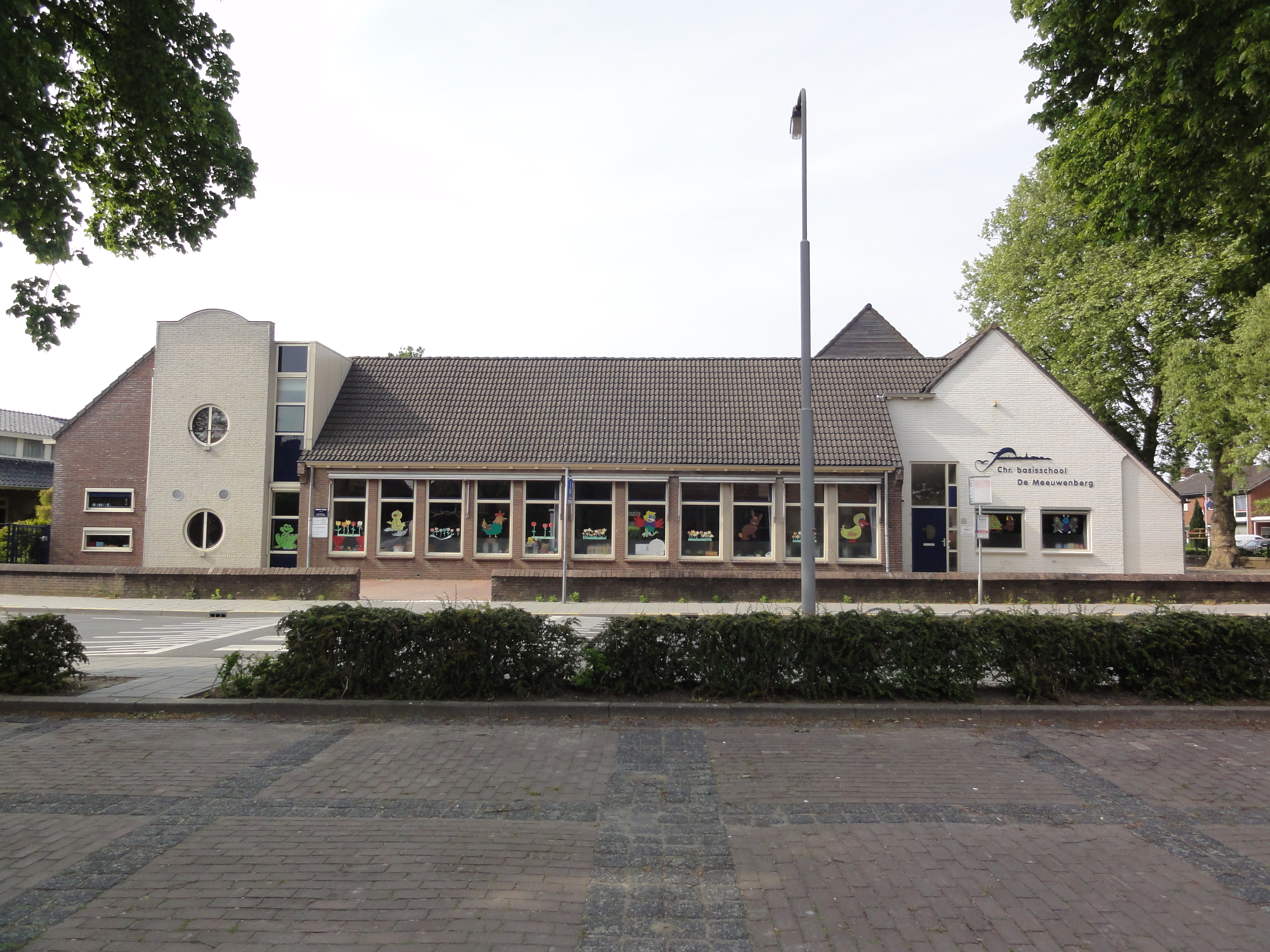
- School in Driel

- Location in the Netherlands Driel (Netherlands)
- Coordinates: 51°58′N 5°49′E
- Country: Netherlands
- Province: Gelderland
- Municipality: Overbetuwe

Area
  - Total: 8.70 km^{2} (3.36 sq mi)
- Elevation: 9 m (30 ft)

Population (2021)
  - Total: 4,375
  - Density: 503/km^{2} (1,300/sq mi)
- Time zone: UTC+1 (CET)
  - Summer (DST): UTC+2 (CEST)
- Postal code: 6665
- Dialing code: 026

Driel (Dutch pronunciation: [dril]) is a village in the municipality of Overbetuwe, approximately four kilometers southwest of Arnhem on the south bank of the Rhine, in the Netherlands.

== History ==
On 21 September 1944, Driel was the drop zone of the Polish 1st Independent Parachute Brigade which participated in Operation Market Garden. The brigade was under the command of Major General Sosabowski. After World War II, in the 1960s, the Polish monument was placed at the 'Polish Square' (Dutch: 'Polenplein', Polish: ' Plac Polski'). A nearby plaque commemorates the ninety-four Polish soldiers who fell nearby. There are several other plaques, including one in honour of the 1st Airborne Division, along the dike between Heteren, Driel and Arnhem.

On 19 September 2009 the Dutch premier Jan Peter Balkenende and the Polish premier Donald Tusk visited Driel to commemorate the 65th anniversary of Operation Market Garden.

== Gallery ==
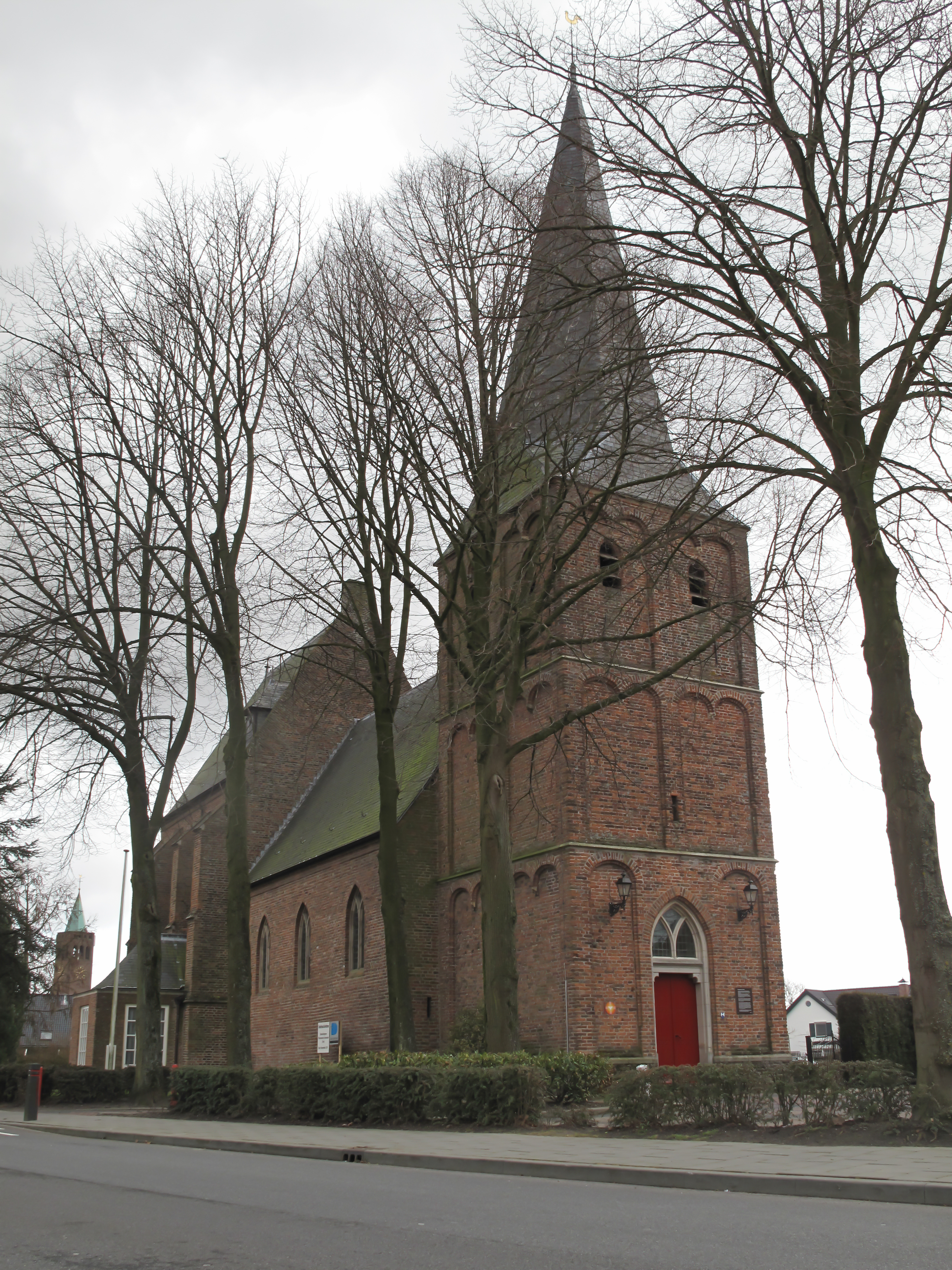
Driel, reformed church

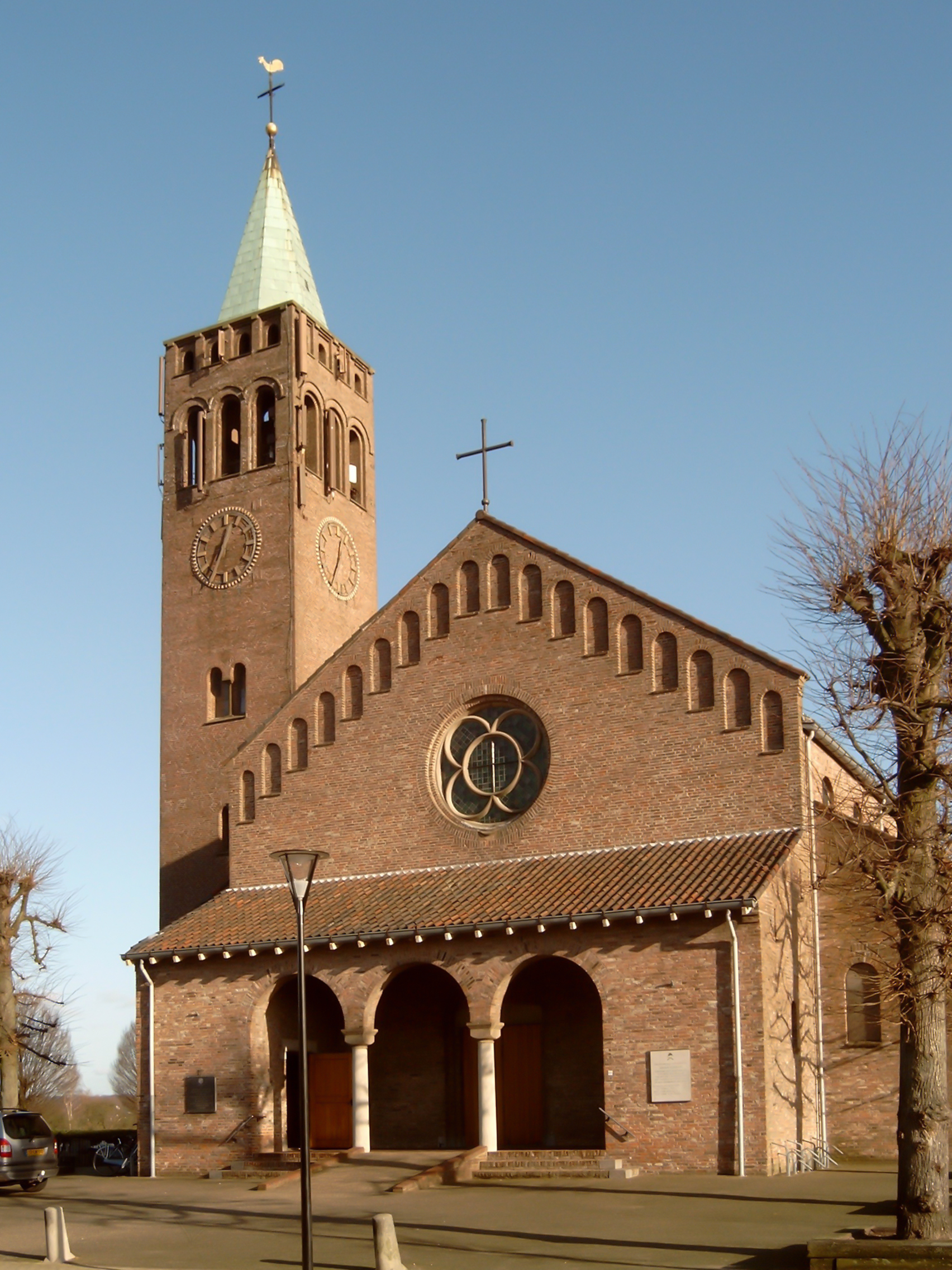
Driel, church: Maria Geboortekerk

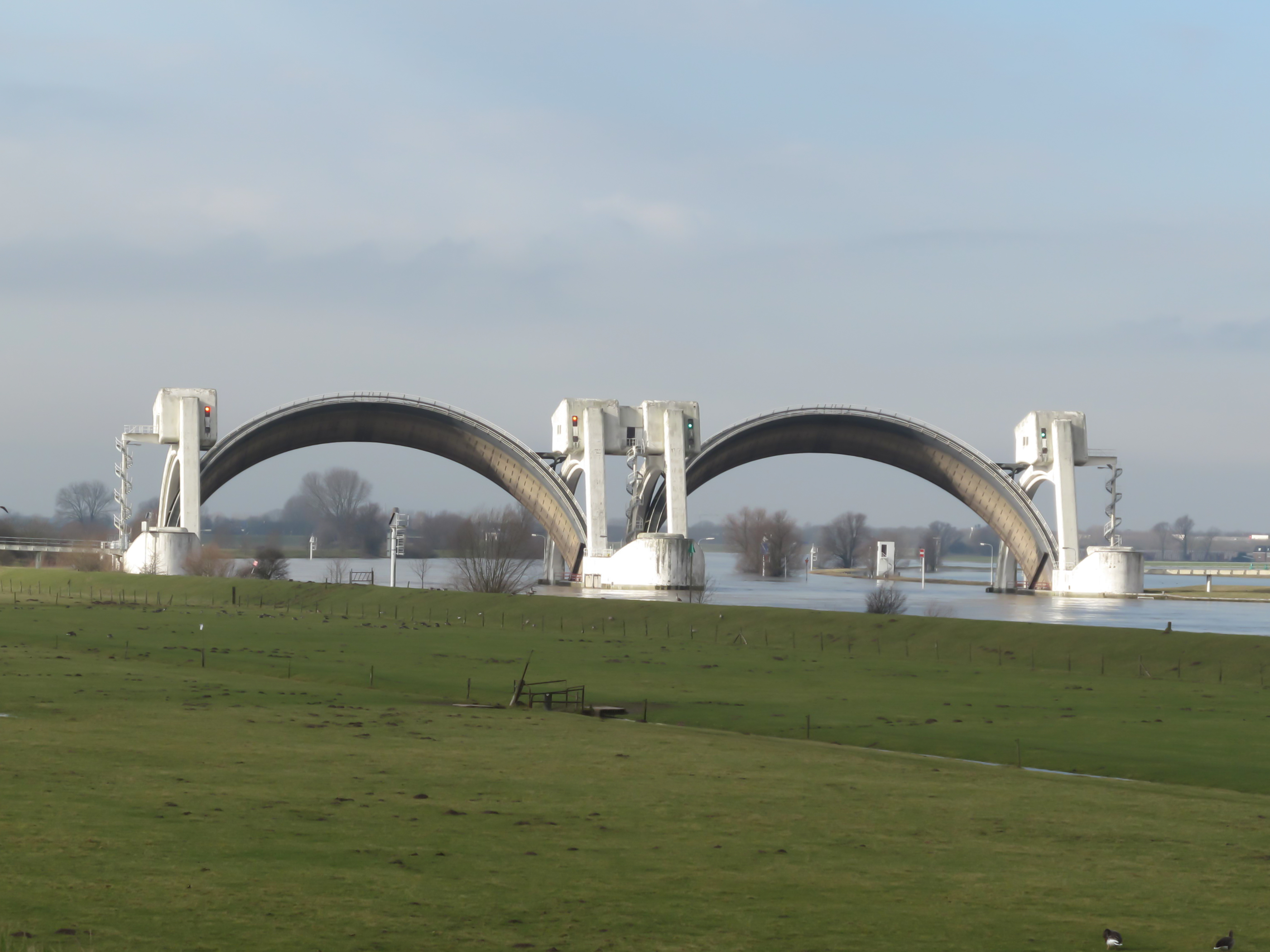
Driel, weir

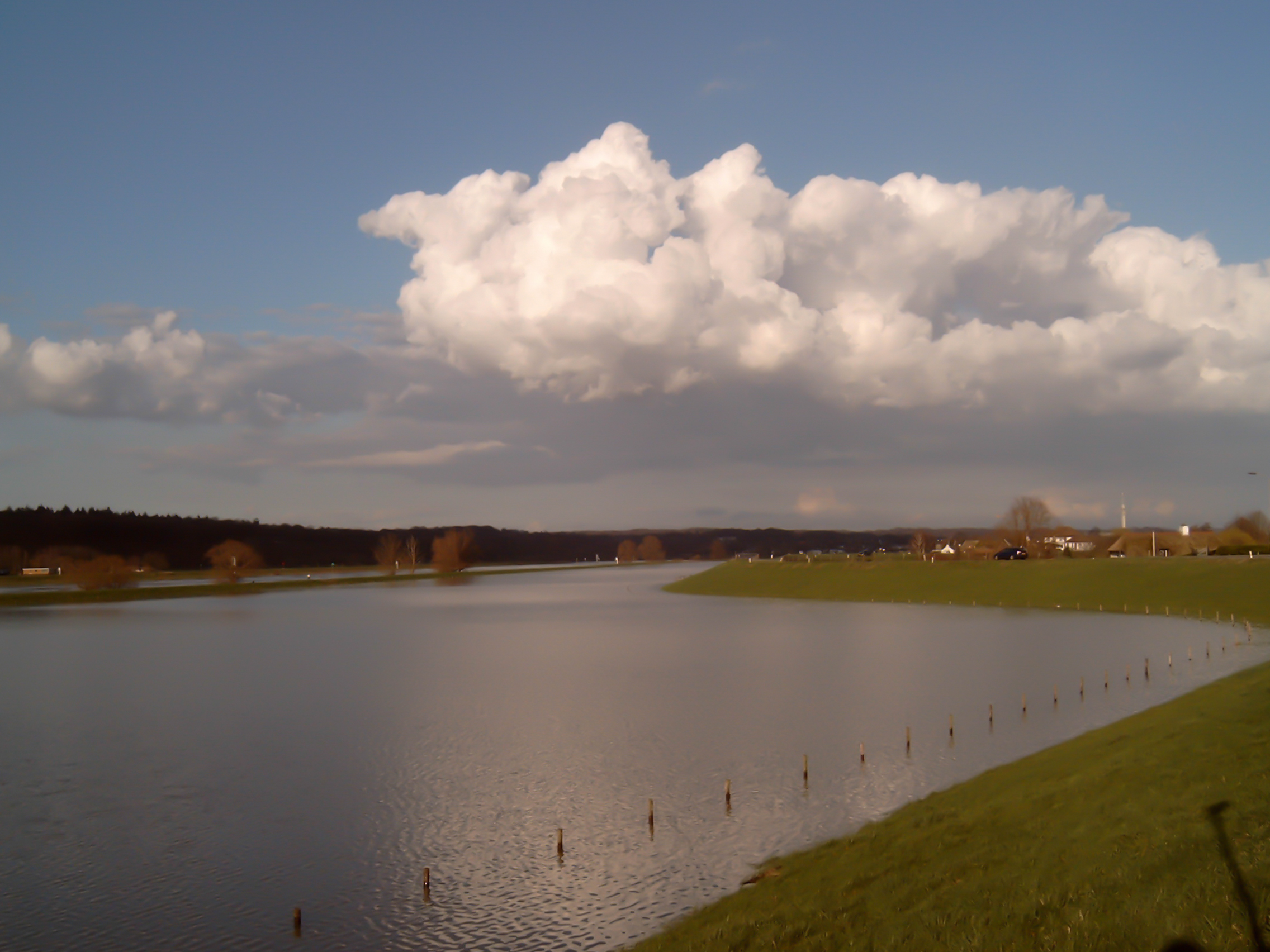
Driel, river: Rhine

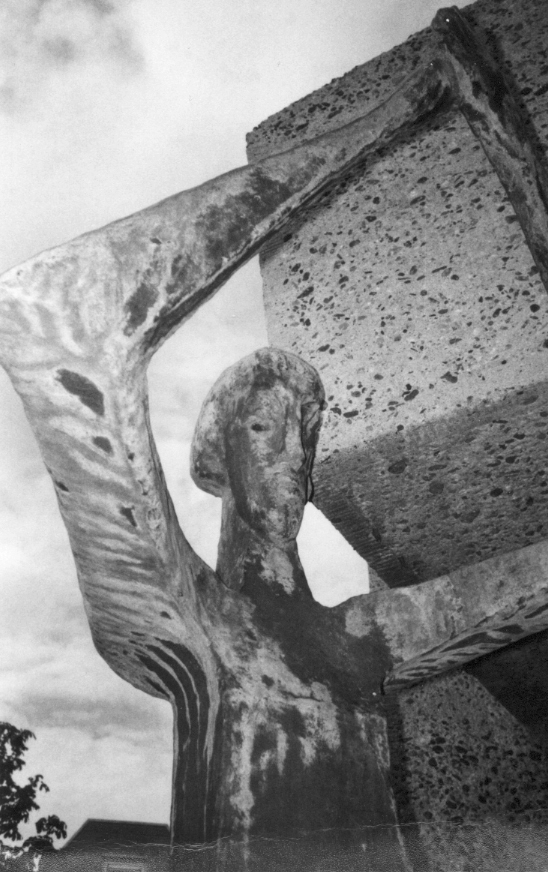
Monument

== Notable inhabitants ==
- Jacob Jan Cremer (1827–1880) – novelist
- Kenny van Hummel (born 1982) – professional cyclist
- Loiza Lamers (born 1995) - model
