= Holland's Next Top Model season 2 =

Holland's Next Top Model
- Season 2
- Judges: Yfke Sturm; Rosalie van Breemen; Carli Hermès; Karin Swerink; Mariana Verkerk
- No. of contestants: 12
- Winner: Kim Feenstra
- No. of episodes: 10

Release
- Original network: RTL 5
- Original release: 12 March – 14 May 2007

Season chronology
- ← Previous; Cycle 1 Next → Cycle 3

The second cycle of Holland's Next Top Model premiered on 12 March 2007 on RTL 5. All of the previous season's judges returned for the new cycle, with the addition of former model and runway coach Mariana Verkerk as a new panel member. Stylist Hildo Groen replaced makeup artist Dominique Samuel as a mentor for the contestants. This was the first cycle of the show to feature a live finale, with a combined vote from the public and the judges to determine the winner.

The prizes for this cycle included a modelling contract with Max Models valued at €50,000, an additional contract with Ice Models in South Africa, a cover feature for Glamour magazine, and a brand new Mercedes-Benz.

The winner of the competition was 21-year-old Kim Feenstra from Groningen.

== Cast ==
=== Contestants ===
(Ages stated are at start of contest)

Contestant	Age	Height	Hometown	Finish	Place
Gioia de Bruijn	20	1.73 m (5 ft 8 in)	Amsterdam	Episode 1	12
Sharmyla de Jong	21	1.77 m (5 ft 9 1/2 in)	Haarlem	Episode 2	11
Maan Limburg	18	1.85 m (6 ft 1 in)	Utrecht	Episode 3	10–9
Bengü Orhan	20	1.75 m (5 ft 9 in)	Gorinchem	Episode 3	10–9
Tanimara Teterissa	19	1.74 m (5 ft 8 1/2 in)	Amsterdam	Episode 4	8
Sandra van Amstel	20	1.77 m (5 ft 9 1/2 in)	Huizen	Episode 5	7
Loïs Hoeboer	17	1.74 m (5 ft 8 1/2 in)	Haarlem	Episode 6	6
River Hoeboer	17	1.74 m (5 ft 8 1/2 in)	Haarlem	Episode 7	5
Bodil de Jong	18	1.80 m (5 ft 11 in)	Leeuwarden	Episode 8	4
Sabrina van der Donk	18	1.78 m (5 ft 10 in)	Zeewolde	Episode 10	3
Christa Verboom	20	1.79 m (5 ft 10 1/2 in)	Apeldoorn	Episode 10	2
Kim Feenstra	21	1.80 m (5 ft 11 in)	Groningen	Episode 10	1

=== Judges ===
- Yfke Sturm (host)
- Rosalie van Breemen
- Carli Hermès
- Karin Swerink
- Mariana Verkerk

=== other cast members ===
- Hildo Groen
- Ruud van der Peijl

== Episodes ==
No. overall	No. in season	Title	Original release date
9	1	"Episode 1"	12 March 2007
The semi-finalists attended casting week, and the judges chose the final 12 contestants. The finalists moved into the model home, and later went topless in a jeans photo shoot for Vero Moda. At elimination, Gioia and Sabrina landed in the bottom two. Sabrina was given a second chance, and Gioia became the first contestant to leave the competition.
10	2	"Episode 2"	19 March 2007
The remaining 11 contestants received a modeling crash course from Bastiaan van Schaijk and Angelique Westerhog, and later had to put their knowledge to the test in a styling challenge, which was won by Sandra. They also received makeovers, and had Marilyn Monroe inspired photo shoot at the frigate warship in Den Helder. At elimination, Maan and Sharmyla landed in the bottom two, and Sharmyla was eliminated from the competition.: Special guest: Angelique Westerhog
11	3	"Episode 3"	26 March 2007
The models received a catwalk lesson from judge Mariana Verkerk. Bodil and Kim were deemed to be the best performers, and were given the opportunity to be cast in a Gavin Rajah show in Paris, with Bodil ultimately being picked. Back in Holland, the other eight contestants took part in a trampoline photo shoot. Upon arriving back in Amsterdam Bodil and Kim learned that they had been given immunity for that week's elimination. At panel Bengü and Maan landed in the bottom two, and left the competition in a double elimination.: Special guest: Gavin Rajah
12	4	"Episode 4"	2 April 2007
The contestants received a fitness training session, where Sabrina was chosen as the best performer. As her prize, she received a pampering session for two, which she chose to share with Tanimara. On set, the models had an emotional crying photo shoot with photographer Paul Bellaart. At elimination, Christa, Kim, and Tanimara landed in the bottom three, and Tanimara became the fifth contestant to leave the competition.: Featured photographer: Paul Bellaart
13	5	"Episode 5"	9 April 2007
The contestants were given the opportunity to star in a video for the Dutch hip-hop group R.O.O.O.M, with Bodil being chosen as the best performer and winning a spot in their clip. They later had a photo shoot with judge and photographer Carli Hermès where they had to pose with a male model in an ad for LG. At elimination, Sabrina and Sandra landed in the bottom two. Sabrina was allowed to remain in the competition, and Sandra was eliminated.: Featured photographer: Carli Hermès
14	6	"Episode 6"	16 April 2007
The models attended castings. The best performers, Bodil, Christina, and Sabrina, were given knowledge about the nature of the upcoming photo shoot as a leg up on the competition. On set, the contestants were photographed in a beauty shoot for L'Oreal. They later met host Yfke Sturm at Vero Moda, and learned that the remainder of the competition would be taking place in Cape Town, South Africa. At elimination, Kim and Loïs landed in the bottom two, and Loïs became the seventh contestant to leave the competition.
15	7	"Episode 7"	23 April 2007
The models arrived at Cape Town, and moved into their luxury hotel. They later received a dance and gymnastics lesson, and learned to channel their expressions in a challenge which was ultimately won by Kim. As her reward, she received a stay at the hotel's honeymoon suite with a friend of her choosing, while the other three contestants had to sleep in the middle of the jungle. On set, the contestants were styled in urban African wear as they posed with wild animals in a photo shoot for Glamour. At elimination, Bodil and River landed in the bottom two, and River was asked to leave the competition.
16	8	"Episode 8"	30 April 2007
The contestants were taken to Gavin Rajah's shop, where they were asked to choose a dress suitable for a cocktail party. Kim was chosen as the challenge winner. The models later attended castings around the city, and had a photo shoot with body paint where they had to embody different animals. At elimination, Bodil and Sabrina landed in the bottom two. Bodil was eliminated, leaving Christa, Kim, and Sabrina as the three remaining finalists.: Featured photographer: Gavin Rajah
17	9	"Episode 9"	7 May 2007
This episode focused on the day-to-day lives of the three finalists as they were visited by the judges and prepared for the cycle's live finale. The voting lines for each of the three models opened during this episode, and remained open until the following week.
18	10	"Episode 10"	14 May 2007
The contestants performed in a series of live challenges, and the show went over footage of the models performing in a photo shoot for the cover of Glamour magazine. At the end of the night, the judges scored the remaining models on a scale from one to ten, and after adding the public vote to the judge's vote, Kim was revealed to be the winner of the competition.

== Results ==
Order	Episodes									
Order	1 (Note: In episode 1, the pool of 20 semi-finalists was reduced to the final 12 contestants.)		2	3 (Note: In episode 3, Bodil and Kim were immune from elimination after winning a challenge. Bengü and Maan were both eliminated when they landed in the bottom two.)	4 (Note: In episode 4, there was a bottom three, as opposed to the usual bottom two.)	5	6	7	8	10 (Note: During the live final, each of the judges was allowed to vote for one of the three remaining models. The weight of each individual vote was ten points, with a possible total of 50 points. Kim received the overwhelming majority of the viewer vote with a total of 40 points, equal to roughly 80% of the total votes, with the remaining 20% (10 points) split evenly between Christa and Sabrina. After Kim met the 50 point mark with 10 points from Yfke Sturm, she was declared the winner, as it would have been mathematically impossible for the other two contestants to win with the remainder of the votes.)
1	Christa	Bengü	River	Bodil	Loïs	Kim	River	Sabrina	Kim	Kim
2	Bodil	Tanimara	Kim	Kim	Bodil	Christa	Christa	Kim	Christa	Christa
3	River	Bodil	Christa	Sabrina	Sabrina	Loïs	Bodil	Christa	Sabrina	Sabrina
4	Kim	Kim	Sabrina	Loïs	Sandra	River	Sabrina	Bodil	Bodil	
5	Tanimara	Sandra	Tanimara	River	River	Bodil	Kim	River		
6	Gioia	Christa	Bodil	Sandra	Christa	Sabrina	Loïs			
7	Sandra	River	Bengü	Tanimara	Kim	Sandra				
8	Sabrina	Sharmyla	Sandra	Christa	Tanimara					
9	Maan	Loïs	Loïs	Bengü; Maan						
10	Bengü	Maan	Maan	Bengü; Maan						
11	Sharmyla	Sabrina	Sharmyla							
12	Loïs	Gioia								

The contestant was eliminated
The contestant was immune from elimination
The contestant won the competition

=== Final scores ===
Place	Final scores			
Place	Contestant	Judge's vote	Viewer vote	Total score
1	Kim	10 points	40 points (80%)	50 points
2	Christa	20 points	5 points (10%)	25 points
3	Sabrina	0 points	5 points (10%)	5 points
