= Kim Feenstra =

Dutch model (born 1985)

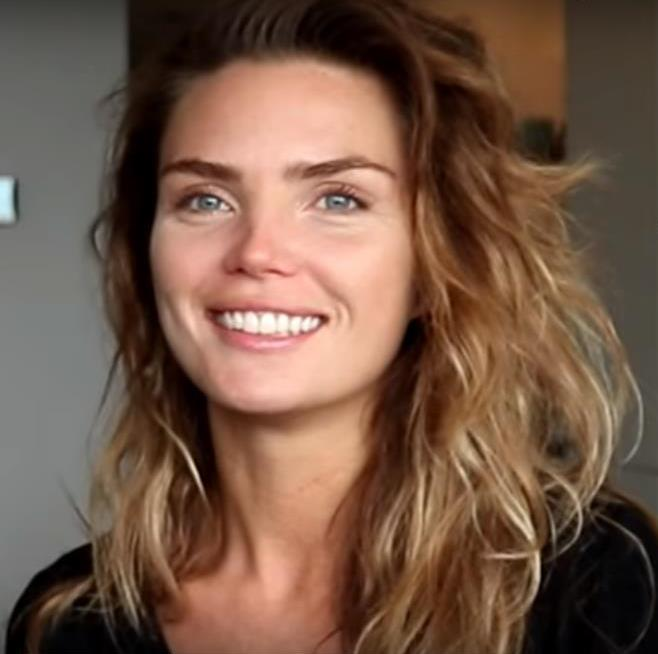
- Kim Feenstra in 2018
- Born: 23 August 1985 (age 41); Groningen, Netherlands
- Spouse: Jimmy van Dijk
- Modeling information
- Height: 5 ft 11 in (1.80 m)
- Hair color: Brown
- Eye color: Blue
- Agency: VDM Model Management
- Website: www.k2im.nl

Kim Feenstra (Dutch pronunciation: [kɪɱ ˈfeːnstraː]; born 23 August 1985) is a Dutch model. She was the winning contestant of Cycle 2 of Holland's Next Top Model in 2007.

== Modelling ==
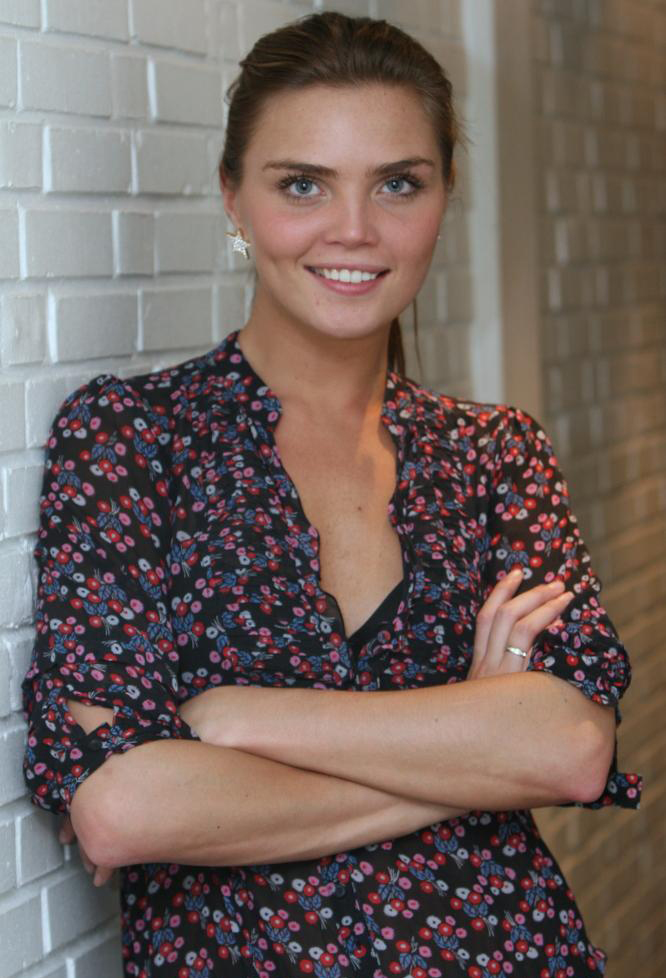
Feenstra (2009)

Feenstra came to prominence as a contestant on cycle two of Holland's Next Top Model. Later in the show she confessed to being partially deaf in both ears due to an accident when she was a child. In the final episode, host Yfke Sturm called her the perfect candidate with potential for both runway and photographic modelling, and that Feenstra had the most potential of all the contestants to make it on either the national or international stage. Her prize was a €50,000 modeling contract with Max Models, a cover for Glamour magazine, three months of all expenses paid modelling in South Africa for Ice Models, and a Mercedes-Benz A-Class. Feenstra subsequently starred on the cover of Glamour magazine's Summer edition.

Feenstra is signed to Scoop Models in Copenhagen, Denmark, and MP Management in Milan, Italy.

She played a part in the movie The Last Ottoman in a love scene with Turkish actor Kenan İmirzalıoğlu. In 2013 she played the leading role in two movies, one of which was Verliefd op Ibiza (in love with/on Ibiza), directed by Johan Nijenhuis, which reached the first place at the Dutch box office, with a total yield of more than 5,1 million.

Mannenharten, directed by Mark de Cloe, was another success in the Netherlands in 2013. It premiered on 28 November 2013, and during its first two weeks attracted 215,000 people to the movie theaters and earned a total of 1.6 million. At the end of the year it ranked 5th of the top films. The sequel is already there, with Kim Feenstra and most of the original cast members in the story of six urban men in a gym, at a turning point in their lives. They are looking for their place in life and to the person who they want on their side.

Iva Mirbach, editor in chief of FashionModelDirectory.com, the world's largest fashion database, established in 1998, choose Kim Feenstra "who looks up to Waris Dirie is the perfect choice to kick off the new year" to be the model of the month in 2014.

== Personal life ==
Feenstra is partly of Indonesian descent.

Before competing on Holland's Next Top Model, Feenstra worked as a call girl.

Since posing on Top Model, Feenstra has gone on to pose for many magazines, including Vogue Italia.

== Controversy ==
=== Promotion of conspiracy theories ===
Feenstra has attracted controversy for spreading debunked conspiracy theories through her social media accounts. She was first noted for spreading QAnon-style conspiracy theories in 2020.

In February 2023, Feenstra participated in a campaign initiated by far-right activists against writer Pim Lammers. Lammers was due to write a poem for the Kinderboekenweek, an annual event to promote Dutch literature for children. In 2015, Lammers wrote a work of fiction, which was aimed at adults, and which describes the way in which a young boy is groomed by an adult man. A far-right activist published an article containing portions of this text, branding Lammers a "gay activist" who spreads "fantasies about abuse by pedophiles". Feenstra cited this article on social media and accused Lammers of "glorifying pedophilia". The campaign resulted in Lammers receiving death threats and deciding to resign from writing the poem. Feenstra celebrated Lammers' decision to step down. In response to criticism, Feenstra affirmed her belief in the debunked Pizzagate-conspiracy theory.
