= Carli Hermès =

Dutch photographer and director (born 1963)

- Born: Carli Hermès; 23 April 1963; Schijndel, Netherlands
- Known for: Photography, film

Carli Hermès (born 23 April 1963 in Schijndel) is a Dutch photographer and director.

Carli Hermès studied photography at the Royal Academy of Art (The Hague) and The Arts Institute at Bournemouth in England. He became international known with his commercial photographs for brands like Martini, Swatch, Levi's, Mexx, Nike, WE, Philips, Sony, BMW, Suitsupply and Mercedes-Benz. In addition, he also made several fashion reports for known magazines like; Dutch, ELLE, Zoom, Max, Black & White, Madame Figaro en Avenue. He also photographed internationally famous people such as Edgar Davids, Inge de Bruijn, Leon de Winter, Natalie Imbruglia and Rutger Hauer.

Besides his work as a photographer he is also active as a director for commercials and videos for brands like; G-star, Royal Club, Marco Borsato (Dutch singer) and the Dutch Railroad company. In 2006 and 2007 Carli was a member of the jury of Holland's Next Top Model.

His latest work, "Elements", was presented from April until July 2008 in art gallery "Rademakers" in Amsterdam.

== Publishings ==
- Focus Cahier - Carli Hermès in Backstage (1990)
- Carli Hermès - Both Sides (1995)
- Smelik Stokking - Carli Hermès
- Carli Hermès - Glitz (2003)
- Carli Hermès - The Elements (2008)
