= Yfke Sturm =

Dutch model (born 1981)

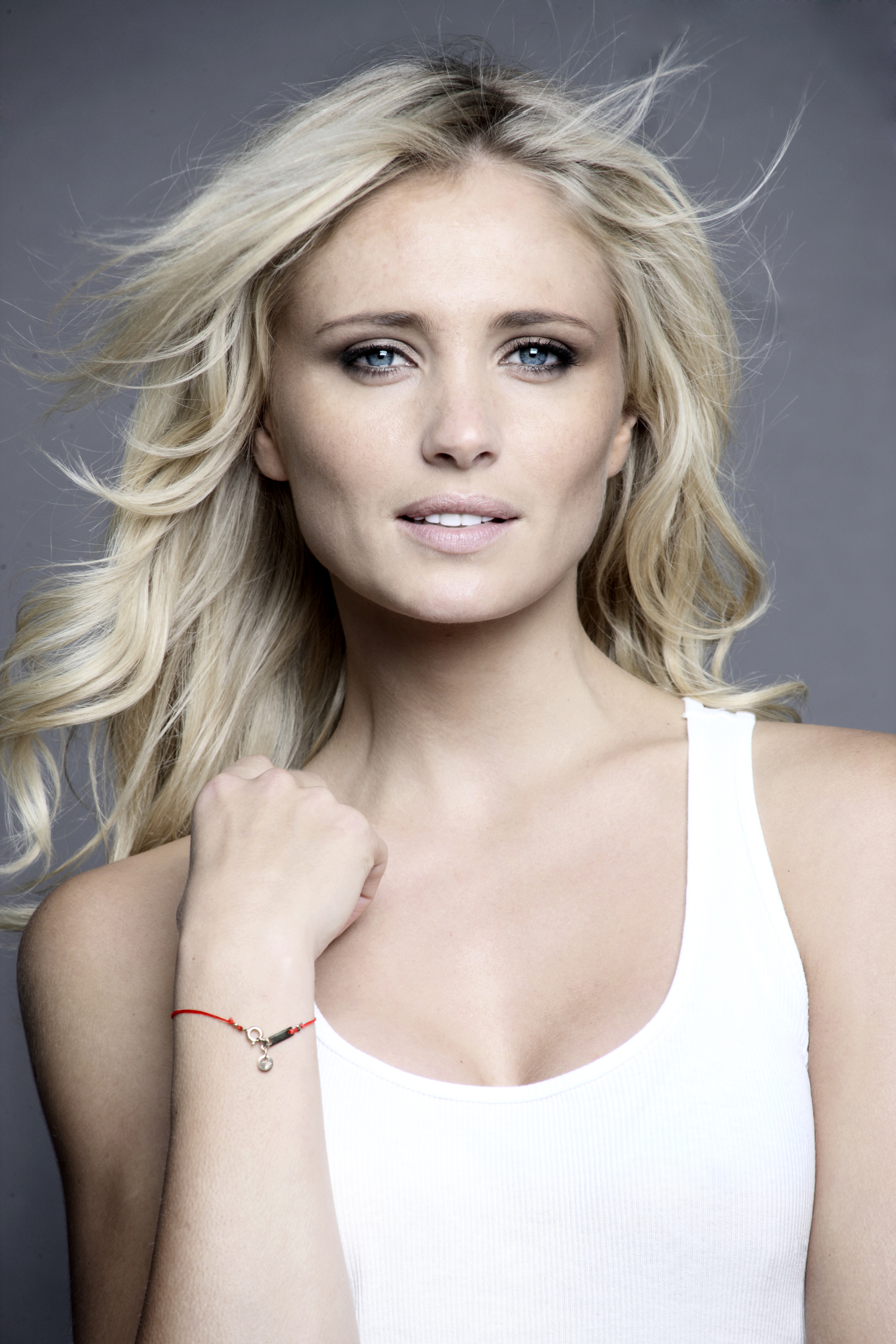
- Born: 19 November 1981 (age 44); Almere, Netherlands
- Spouse: Giles Coren
- Children: 1
- Modeling information
- Height: 1.80 m (5 ft 11 in)
- Hair color: Blonde
- Eye color: Blue
- Agency: Next Model Management (Paris); Touche Models (Amsterdam); Modelink (Gothenburg); Model Management (Hamburg); Munich Models (Munich); MP Stockholm (Stockholm)
- Website: http://www.yfke.tv

Yfke Sturm (born 19 November 1981) is a Dutch model.

== Life and career ==
Sturm was born on 19 November 1981 in Almere, Flevoland. She was discovered in 1997 in Almere, by an Elite Model Management scout. Shortly thereafter, she entered the Dutch Elite Model Look Contest. Winning this contest was followed by winning the 1997 International Elite Model Look Contest in Nice, France. Sturm was 15 years old at the time. After her win, she signed exclusive contracts with Ralph Lauren and Calvin Klein. She has also modelled for Victoria's Secret.

=== TV host ===
In 2006, Sturm became the host of Holland's Next Top Model, the Dutch version of America's Next Top Model, which is shown on prime-time TV and is popular. After the second season of HNTM, she decided to focus on her career as a model, as it was difficult to combine the TV work with her successful modeling career. In 2011 she made a guest appearance on Holland's Next Top Model. In December 2016 she started working for Fox Netherlands as a presenter, starting with the Victoria's Secret Fashion Show 2016, where she took backstage interviews.

=== Yfke's Model Secrets ===
Sturm is the co-author of the 2009 book Yfke's Model Secrets. It includes tips about exercise and diet and stories about the modeling industry.

== Personal life ==
Sturm is in a longterm relationship with businessman Giles Coren. She previously lived in New York City, and later moved to London. In 2015 she had a son with Giles.

In September 2015 Sturm was seriously injured when she fell off a surf jet off the island of Ischia and was sailed over by a boat. She was airlifted to the nearest hospital with a fractured skull and spinal fractures, and was placed in a medically induced coma.

In 2026, the US Department of Justice released parts of the Epstein Files, including email correspondence from 2011 to 2015, allegedly between Sturm and Jeffrey Epstein. The emails, which occurred after Epstein's 2008 conviction for solicitation of prostitution with a minor, include discussion about Sturm's divorce as well as sexually explicit messages. In the emails, Epstein asked Sturm to introduce him to other women, but there is no evidence that Sturm did so. Sturm has declared that her contact with Epstein was "naive" and a "serious error of judgement".

== Bibliography ==
- (2009) Yfke's Model Secrets with Martĳn van Stuyvenberg
