= Top Model =

Fashion-themed reality television show

- Created by: Tyra Banks
- Original work: America's Next Top Model
- Owner: Paramount Skydance
- Years: 2003–present

Films and television
- Television series: International versions, see below

Miscellaneous
- Genre: Reality television
- First aired: May 20, 2003
- Distributor: CBS Media Ventures

Top Model, also called Next Top Model, is a fashion-themed reality television show format produced in many countries throughout the world and seen in over 120 countries producing over 200 seasons (referred to as "cycles"). The show takes the form of a modeling competition whose winners typically receive a contract with a major modeling agency and a cover shoot and fashion photo spread in a fashion magazine. The format was created by Tyra Banks for the original series, America's Next Top Model, which first aired in 2003 and was produced by Ken Mok's 10 by 10 Entertainment.

== Format description ==
=== Contestants ===
Each cycle of the show consists of 6–40 episodes and begins with 9–52 contestants. In each episode one contestant is eliminated, though in some cases there may be double eliminations, multiple eliminations, or no elimination at all, based on the consensus of the judging panel. Makeovers are administered to contestants early in the cycle, usually before the first elimination or after the first or second elimination.

=== Challenges ===
Each episode usually begins with the contestants receiving training in an area concurrent with the week's theme. For example, contestants may get coached in runway walking, improvisational acting, and clothing to suit various occasions. A related challenge soon follows, such as a mock (or real) runway show or interview, where one of the models is chosen as the winner (sometimes more than 1 models win the challenge).

The winner of the challenge receives some prizes, such as a contract, a night out, or an advantage at the next photo shoot. The winning contestant is sometimes permitted to share their reward with other contestants of their choosing and on some occasions, may gain immunity from elimination at the next judging. Losing the challenge can result in some minor punishment, like losing frames for the next photo shoot. It can also end in the immediate elimination of the contestant.

Each episode, which covers the events of roughly one week of real time, is usually associated with a theme in the world of modeling, such as dealing with the press in interviews, selling a commercial product, appearing in a runway show, or visiting prospective employers in "go-sees".

In some franchises, the contestants will go to real-life castings. The model who is chosen will complete what is required for the casting, resulting in a leave of absence within the episode – sometimes skipping the photo shoot and other challenges – but is rewarded with immunity for booking the job.

=== Photo shoots ===
The next segment is usually a photo shoot, which may involve beauty shots (closeup photos emphasizing the face), posing in swimwear, lingerie or other clothing, posing nude or semi-nude, posing with a male model, or posing with animals among other themes. Usually, one photo shoot per cycle is replaced with a television commercial or music video shoot.

Performance in each week's photo or video shoot weighs heavily in the final judging.

=== Judging ===
The final segment of each episode involves judging by a panel of fashion industry experts. In addition to the regular judges, usually, there is a special guest judge related to that week's theme. Contestants are sometimes given a final challenge in some area of modeling such as posing, runway walking, selling a product, or choosing an appropriate outfit or makeup to satisfy a given situation. Each contestant's photo or video performance is then shown and evaluated by the panel. After all the content has been evaluated, the contestants leave the room and the judges deliberate. Germany, Austria, and Indonesia (cycle 2 - cycle 3) feature a themed runway segment in addition to the judging of the photos or videos.

The elimination process follows a rigid format, as the host reveals, one by one and in order of merit, the photos of the contestants who have not been eliminated. Each photo is given to the corresponding contestant, who is told by the host something similar to, "Congratulations. You are still in the running towards becoming [this country or region's] Next Top Model." The first-called contestant may receive additional benefits, such as having their photo displayed prominently in the contestants' living quarters or being allowed to share in the following week's challenge winnings, regardless of their performance in the challenge. The last two contestants who have not received their photos are brought forward for special critiques by the host before the final photo is revealed. The contestant who does not receive a photo is thus eliminated from the competition. Sometimes the last two contestants are both eliminated; rarely, neither is eliminated. Multiple eliminations can also take place.

In some versions of the show, contestants find out whether or not they will continue on in the competition in a completely random fashion. The contestants may be called forward in random order to find out whether or not they performed best during the week. The last two contestants are usually the worst performers. This format is followed by Denmark (cycle 4), the Netherlands (cycles 6–9) and Peru.

In other cases, the models are each called back into the elimination room after deliberation. Upon being called back, they are either eliminated on the spot, declared safe, or they are asked to wait for their results. If the latter happens, the process is repeated with the remaining pool of contestants in danger. This elimination format has been followed by several versions of the show, most notably Austria (cycles 2–9), Germany and Denmark (cycles 2–3,5–6) along with two former versions; Croatia and Serbia.

Episodes typically end with the image of the eliminated models fading away from a group shot of the remaining contestants.

=== International destinations ===
A trip to an international destination is typically scheduled at about two-thirds of the way through the competition, usually with five or six contestants remaining. While overseas, each episode covers roughly three to four days, totaling two weeks of filming abroad. In some international versions, contestants have traveled from two to six different countries.

=== Live shows ===
In some versions of the show, the winner is determined during a live broadcast. This has been done in Germany, Russia, Croatia, Israel, Belgium, the Netherlands (cycles 2-10), Benelux (a combination of the former two), Austria, Serbia, New Zealand (cycle 3), Australia (cycles 3–8), Britain (cycle 6), Poland, Vietnam and Greece (cycle 3). Votes are usually submitted via SMS or on any other given website. In cycle 17 of America's Next Top Model the first panel was presented in front of a live crowd, but this wasn't broadcast until the cycle premiere some months later. Also, the elimination process was shot privately during the production.

=== All-Stars ===
Cycle 17 of America's Next Top Model featured returning models from previous cycles with an All-Stars competition. In cycle 18 of the same version, seven British models from Britain's Next Top Model competed along with new American contestants. The eighth cycle of Vietnam's Next Top Model also featured returning models from previous cycles. The seventh cycle of Top Model po-ukrainsky also featured returning models from previous cycles.

=== Social media voting, Scoring and Comeback series ===
Through cycles 19-21, America's Next Top Model enabled social media fans to vote for each contestant's photos online based on a scale ranging from 1 (being the worst) to 10 (being the best). Voting took place as filming progressed, so that the results could be seen when the show began to air on television. Each judge also scored each picture based on the same scale, with the total fan vote weighing the same as the vote of a judge. Furthermore, one or more eliminated contestants received the opportunity to re-enter the competition if they earned the highest overall score average over a certain period of time. The social media voting was removed beginning with cycle 22.

The social media scoring system was also implemented in the sixth and seventh cycles of Austria's Next Topmodel. In contrast to the American adaptation, each voter is required to cast their votes on the show's website with accounts that link with Facebook. Furthermore, there is no grading scale. Each Facebook account is allotted three votes, which can be spent on any combination of contestants. The contestant with the highest number of votes each round is granted immunity, while the contestant with the lowest amount is automatically nominated for elimination along with three other contestants chosen by the judges. A comeback round also takes place about two thirds into the competition.

A separate scoring system, without social media voting, was introduced in the ninth cycle of Australia's Next Top Model. The combined challenge and judge scores are used to determine who will be eliminated each week. It was also the system used in the twenty-second cycle of America's Next Top Model, and adapted by other versions of the show.

== International Top Model series ==
The Top Model format has been adapted for numerous national and regional versions around the world.

Active
No longer active

Region/country	Name(s) of series	Network(s)	Cycle(s) & winner(s)	Host(s)
Africa	Africa's Next Top Model	M-net Africa Magic	Cycle 1, 2013–2014: Aamito Lagum	Oluchi Onweagba
Albania	Albania's Next Top Model	Top Channel (cycle 1); Supersonic TV (cycle 2)	Cycle 1, 2010–2011: Erida Lama; Cycle 2, 2011: Greis Drenn	Aurela Hoxha
Australia	Australia's Next Top Model	Fox8	Cycle 1, 2005: Gemma Sanderson; Cycle 2, 2006: Eboni Stocks; Cycle 3, 2007: Alice Burdeu; Cycle 4, 2008: Demelza Reveley; Cycle 5, 2009: Tahnee Atkinson; Cycle 6, 2010: Amanda Ware; Cycle 7, 2011: Montana Cox; Cycle 8, 2013: Melissa Juratowitch; Cycle 9, 2015: Brittany Beattie; Cycle 10, 2016: Aleyna FitzGerald	Erika Heynatz (cycles 1–2); Jodhi Meares (cycles 3–4) (Note: Charlotte Dawson was hosting the live final of cycle 4 while Jodhi Meares was not present at that event.); Sarah Murdoch (cycles 5–7); Jennifer Hawkins (cycles 8-10)
Austria	Austria's Next Topmodel	Puls 4 (cycles 1–7, 9); ATV (cycle 8)	Cycle 1, 2009: Larissa Marolt; Cycle 2, 2009–2010: Aylin Kösetürk; Cycle 3, 2011: Lydia Obute; Cycle 4, 2012: Antonia Hausmair; Cycle 5, 2013: Greta Uszkai; Cycle 6, 2014: Oliver Stummvoll; Cycle 7, 2015–2016: Fabian Herzgsell; Cycle 8, 2017: Isak Omorodion; Cycle 9, 2019: Taibeh Ahmadi	Lena Gercke (cycles 1–4); Melanie Scheriau (cycles 5–7); Eveline Hall (cycle 8); Franziska Knuppe (cycle 9)
Belgium	Topmodel	2BE	Cycle 1, 2007: Hanne Baekelandt; Cycle 2, 2008: Virginie Bleyaert	Ingrid Seynhaeve (cycle 1); An Lemmens (cycle 2)
Belgium	Belgium's Next Top Model	Streamz	Cycle 1, 2023: Gilles Verbruggen; Cycle 2, 2024: Bréseïs Simons	Hannelore Knuts
Benelux	Benelux' Next Top Model	2BE; RTL 5	Cycle 1, 2009: Rosalinde Kikstra; Cycle 2, 2010: Melissa Baas	Daphne Deckers
Brazil	Brazil's Next Top Model	Sony Entertainment Television	Cycle 1, 2007: Mariana Velho; Cycle 2, 2008: Maíra Vieira; Cycle 3, 2009: Camila Trindade	Fernanda Motta
Cambodia	Cambodia's Next Top Model	MYTV	Cycle 1, 2014–2015: Chan Kongkar	Yok Chenda
Canada	Canada's Next Top Model	City (cycles 1–2); CTV (cycle 3)	Cycle 1, 2006: Andrea Muizelaar; Cycle 2, 2007: Rebecca Hardy; Cycle 3, 2009: Meaghan Waller	Tricia Helfer (cycle 1); Jay Manuel (cycles 2–3)
Caribbean	Caribbean's Next Top Model	CaribVision (cycle 1); Flow TV (cycle 2–4)	Cycle 1, 2013: Treveen Stewart; Cycle 2, 2015: Kittisha Doyle; Cycle 3, 2017: Shamique Simms; Cycle 4, 2018: Le Shae Riley	Wendy Fitzwilliam
China	China's Next Top Model	Sichuan TV (cycles 1–3); Travel Channel (cycle 4); Chongqing TV (cycle 5)	Cycle 1, 2008: Yin Ge; Cycle 2, 2009: Meng Yao; Cycle 3, 2010: Mao Chu Yu; Cycle 4, 2013: Wang Xiao Qian; Cycle 5, 2015: Li Si Jia	Li Ai (cycles 1–3); Shang Wenjie (cycle 4); Lynn Hung & Zhang Liang (cycle 5)
Colombia	Colombia's Next Top Model	Caracol Televisión	Cycle 1, 2013: Mónica Castaño; Cycle 2, 2014: Yuriko Londoño; Cycle 3, 2017: Alejandra Merlano	Carolina Guerra (cycle 1); Carolina Cruz (cycles 2–3)
Croatia	Hrvatski Top Model	RTL	Cycle 1, 2008: Sabina Behlić; Cycle 2, 2010: Rafaela Franić	Tatjana Jurić (cycle 1); Vanja Rupena (cycle 2)
Denmark	Danmarks Næste Topmodel	Kanal 4	Cycle 1, 2010: Caroline Bader; Cycle 2, 2011: Julie Hasselby; Cycle 3, 2012: Line Rehkopff; Cycle 4, 2013: Louise Mikkelsen; Cycle 5, 2014: Sarah Madsen; Cycle 6, 2015: Daniel Madsen	Caroline Fleming (cycles 1–5); Cecilie Lassen (cycle 6)
Estonia	Eesti tippmodell	Kanal 2	Cycle 1, 2012: Helina Metsik; Cycle 2, 2013–2014: Sandra Ude; Cycle 3, 2014–2015: Aule Õun; Cycle 4, 2015–2016: Kätlin Hallik	Kaja Wunder (cycle 1); Liisi Eesmaa (cycle 2–4)
Far East	Asia's Next Top Model	Star World (cycles 1–5); Fox Life (cycle 6)	Cycle 1, 2012–2013: Jessica Amornkuldilok; Cycle 2, 2014: Sheena Liam; Cycle 3, 2015: Ayu Gani; Cycle 4, 2016: Tawan Kedkong; Cycle 5, 2017: Maureen Wroblewitz; Cycle 6, 2018: Dana Slosar	Nadya Hutagalung (cycles 1–2); Georgina Wilson (cycle 3); Cindy Bishop (cycles 4–6)
Finland	Suomen huippumalli haussa	Nelonen (cycles 1–6); MTV3 (cycle 7)	Cycle 1, 2008: Ani Alitalo; Cycle 2, 2009: Nanna Grundfeldt; Cycle 3, 2010: Jenna Kuokkanen; Cycle 4, 2011: Anna-Sofia Ali-Sisto; Cycle 5, 2012: Meri Ikonen; Cycle 6, 2017: Jerry Koivisto; Cycle 7, 2022: Jarrah Kollei	Anne Kukkohovi (cycles 1–5); Maryam Razavin (cycle 6); Veronica Verho (cycle 7)
France	Top Model	M6	Cycle 1, 2005: Alizée Gaillard; Cycle 2, 2007: Karen Pillet	Odile Sarron (cycle 1); Adriana Karembeu (cycle 2)
Georgia	TOP gogo	Rustavi 2	Cycle 1, 2012: Tako Mandaria; Cycle 2, 2013: Alisa Kuzmina	Salome Gviniashvili (cycle 1); Nino Tskitishvili (cycle 2)
Germany	Germany's Next Topmodel	ProSieben	Cycle 1, 2006: Lena Gercke; Cycle 2, 2007: Barbara Meier; Cycle 3, 2008: Jennifer Hof; Cycle 4, 2009: Sara Nuru; Cycle 5, 2010: Alisar Ailabouni; Cycle 6, 2011: Jana Beller; Cycle 7, 2012: Luisa Hartema; Cycle 8, 2013: Lovelyn Enebechi; Cycle 9, 2014: Stefanie Giesinger; Cycle 10, 2015: Vanessa Fuchs; Cycle 11, 2016: Kim Hnizdo; Cycle 12, 2017: Céline Bethmann; Cycle 13, 2018: Toni Dreher-Adenuga; Cycle 14, 2019: Simone Kowalski; Cycle 15, 2020: Jacky Wruck; Cycle 16, 2021: Alex-Mariah Peter; Cycle 17, 2022: Lou-Anne Gleissenebner; Cycle 18, 2023: Vivien Blotzki; Cycle 19, 2024: Jermaine Kokoú Kothé & Lea Oude Engberink; Cycle 20, 2025: Daniela Djokić & Moritz Rüdiger; Cycle 21, 2026: Aurélie Siewitz & Ibo Ouro-Bodi	Heidi Klum (Note: Christian Anwander was hosting the live final of Cycle 15 while Heidi Klum couldn't be there at the live event due to COVID-19 pandemic. Klum appeared remotely from her Los Angeles home.)
Greece	Next Top Model	ANT1	Cycle 1, 2009–2010: Seraina Kazamia; Cycle 2, 2010–2011: Cindy Toli	Vicky Kaya
Greece	Greece's Next Top Model	Star Channel	Cycle 1, 2018: Noune Kazaryan; Cycle 2, 2019: Anna-Maria Iliadou & Katia Tarabanko; Cycle 3, 2020: Hercules Chuzinov; Cycle 4, 2021: Kyvéli Hatziefstratiou; Cycle 5, 2022: Aléksia Trajko; Cycle 6, 2025: Xenia Tsirkova; Cycle 7, 2026: Upcoming season	No Host (cycles 1–6) (Note: The judges also served as hosts during the first six seasons.); Iliana Papageorgiou (cycle 7–present)
Hungary	Topmodell	Viasat 3	Cycle 1, 2006: Réka Nagy	Viktória Vámosi (episodes 1–11); Panni Epres (finale) (Note: Panni Epres replaced Viktória Vámosi for hosting duties at the final of Cycle 1. Eventually, Vámosi was fired before the final.)
Hungary	Next Top Model Hungary	TV2	Cycle 1, 2024: Lili Mészáros	Nóra Ördög
India	India's Next Top Model	MTV India	Cycle 1, 2015: Danielle Canute; Cycle 2, 2016: Pranati Prakash; Cycle 3, 2017: Riya Subodh; Cycle 4, 2018: Urvi Shetty	Lisa Haydon (cycles 1–2); Malaika Arora (cycles 3–4)
India	Top Model India	Colors Infinity	Cycle 1, 2018: Mahir Pandhi	Lisa Haydon
Indonesia	Indonesia's Next Top Model	NET.	Cycle 1, 2020–2021: Ilene Kurniawan; Cycle 2, 2021-2022: Sarah Tumiwa; Cycle 3, 2022-2023: Iko Bustomi	Luna Maya
Israel	הדוגמניות	Channel 10	Cycle 1, 2005: Victoria Katzman; Cycle 2, 2006: Niral Karantinaji; Cycle 3, 2008: Ella Mashkautzen	Galit Gutmann
Italy	Italia's Next Top Model	Sky Uno	Cycle 1, 2007–2008: Gilda Sansone; Cycle 2, 2008: Michela Maggioni; Cycle 3, 2009: Anastasia Silveri; Cycle 4, 2011: Alice Taticchi	Natasha Stefanenko
Kazakhstan	Ya krasivaya	HiT TV	Cycle 1, 2005: Altyn Baekenova	Ilya Urazakov
Malta	Malta's Top Model	Favourite Channel	Cycle 1, 2009: Audrienne Debono	Claire Amato
Mexico	Mexico's Next Top Model	Sony Entertainment Television	Cycle 1, 2009: Mariana Bayón; Cycle 2, 2011: Tracy Reuss; Cycle 3, 2012: Sahily Córdova; Cycle 4, 2013: Paloma Aguilar; Cycle 5, 2014: Vanessa Ponce	Elsa Benítez (cycles 1–3); Jaydy Michel (cycles 4–5)
Mongolia	The Models; Mongolia's Next Top Model (cycles 1-2)	EduTV	Cycle 1, 2017: Tserendolgor Battsengel; Cycle 2, 2018-2019: Anujin Baynerdene; Cycle 3, 2021-2022: Hanna Buyankhishig	Nora Dagva (cycles 1-2); Urantsetseg Ganbold (cycle 3)
The Netherlands	Holland's Next Top Model	RTL 5 (cycles 1-12); Videoland (cycle 13)	Cycle 1, 2006: Sanne Nijhof; Cycle 2, 2007: Kim Feenstra; Cycle 3, 2007: Cecile Sinclair; Cycle 4, 2008: Ananda Lândertine; Cycle 5, 2011: Tamara Weijenberg; Cycle 6, 2013: Nikki Steigenga; Cycle 7, 2014: Nicky Opheij; Cycle 8, 2015: Loiza Lamers; Cycle 9, 2016: Akke Marije Marinus; Cycle 10, 2017: Montell van Leijen; Cycle 11, 2018: Soufyan Gnini; Cycle 12, 2019: Marcus Hansma; Cycle 13, 2022: Lando van der Schee; Cycle 14, 2024: Gitte van Elst	Yfke Sturm (cycles 1–2); Daphne Deckers (cycles 3–5); Anouk Smulders (cycle 6–9); Anna Nooshin (cycle 10-12); Loiza Lamers (cycle 13-)
New Zealand	New Zealand's Next Top Model	TV3	Cycle 1, 2009: Christobelle Grierson-Ryrie; Cycle 2, 2010: Danielle Hayes; Cycle 3, 2011: Brigette Thomas	Sara Tetro
Norway	Top Model Norge; Top Model (cycles 1–4)	TV3	Cycle 1, 2006: Maria Eilertsen; Cycle 2, 2007: Kamilla Alnes; Cycle 3, 2008: Martine Lervik; Cycle 4, 2011: Claudia Bull; Cycle 5, 2013: Frida Solaker	Kathrine Sørland (cycle 1); Vendela Kirsebom (cycles 2–3); Mona Grudt (cycle 4); Siri Tollerød (cycle 5)
Peru	Peru's Next Top Model	Andina de Televisión	Cycle 1, 2013: Danea Panta	Valeria De Santis
Philippines	Philippines' Next Top Model	RPN (cycle 1); TV5 (cycle 2)	Cycle 1, 2007: Grendel Alvarado; Cycle 2, 2017: Angela Lehmann	Ruffa Gutierrez (cycle 1); Maggie Wilson (cycle 2)
Poland	Top Model; Top Model. Zostań modelką (cycles 1–3)	TVN	Cycle 1, 2010: Paulina Papierska; Cycle 2, 2011: Olga Kaczyńska; Cycle 3, 2013: Zuza Kołodziejczyk; Cycle 4, 2014: Osi Ugonoh; Cycle 5, 2015: Radek Pestka; Cycle 6, 2016: Patryk Grudowicz; Cycle 7, 2018: Kasia Szklarczyk; Cycle 8, 2019: Dawid Woskanian; Cycle 9, 2020: Mikołaj Śmieszek; Cycle 10, 2021: Dominika Wysocka; Cycle 11, 2022: Klaudia Nieścior; Cycle 12, 2023: Dominik Szymański; Cycle 13, 2024: Klaudia Zioberczyk; Cycle 14, 2025: Michał Kot	Joanna Krupa
Romania	Next Top Model by Cătălin Botezatu	Antena 1	Cycle 1, 2011: Emma Dumitrescu; Cycle 2, 2011: Laura Giurcanu; Cycle 3, 2012: Ramona Popescu	Cătălin Botezatu
Russia	Ty - supermodel	STS	Cycle 1, 2004: Ksenia Kahnovich; Cycle 2, 2005: Svetlana Sergienko; Cycle 3, 2006: Tatyana Pekurovskaya; Cycle 4, 2007: Tatyana Krokhina	Fedor Bondarchuk (cycles 1–2); Alexander Tsekalo (cycle 3); Svetlana Bondarchuk (cycle 4)
Russia	Top Model po-russki	Muz-TV (cycles 1–3); You-TV (cycles 4–5)	Cycle 1, 2011: Mariya Lesovaya; Cycle 2, 2011: Katya Bagrova; Cycle 3, 2012: Tanya Kozuto; Cycle 4, 2012: Yulya Farkhutdinova; Cycle 5, 2014: Evgeniya Nekrasova	Ksenia Sobchak (cycles 1–3); Irina Shayk (cycle 4); Natasha Stefanenko (cycle 5)
Russia	Ty - Topmodel	TNT	Cycle 1, 2021: Tina Tova	Anastasia Reshetova
Scandinavia	Top Model	TV3	Cycle 1, 2005: Kine Bakke; Cycle 2, 2005: Frøydis Elvenes; Cycle 3, 2006: Freja Borchies	Georgianna Robertson (cycle 1); Cynthia Garrett (cycles 2–3); Anne Pedersen; Mini Andén (cycles 1–2); Malin Persson (cycle 3); Kathrine Sørland
Scandinavia	Top Model Curves	TV3	Cycle 1, 2016: Ronja Manfredsson	Lina Rafn; Janka Polliani; Jonas Hallberg
Serbia	Srpski Top Model	Prva	Cycle 1, 2011: Neda Stojanović	Ivana Stanković
Slovakia	Hľadá sa Supermodelka	TV JOJ	Cycle 1, 2007: Ivana Honzová	Michal Hudák & Simona Krainova
Slovenia	Slovenski Top Model	TV3 Slovenia	Cycle 1, 2010: Maja Fučak	Nuša Šenk
South Korea	Korea's Next Top Model	On Style Media	Cycle 1, 2010: Lee Jimin; Cycle 2, 2011: Jin Jung-sun; Cycle 3, 2012: Choi So-ra; Cycle 4, 2013: Shin Hyun-ji; Cycle 5, 2014: Hwang Kibbeum	Jang Yoon-ju
Sweden	Top Model Sverige; Top Model (cycle 1)	TV3	Cycle 1, 2007: Hawa Ahmed; Cycle 2, 2012: Alice Herbst; Cycle 3, 2013: Josefin Gustafsson; Cycle 4, 2014: Feben Negash	Vendela Kirsebom (cycle 1); Izabella Scorupco (cycle 2); Caroline Winberg (cycles 3–4)
Switzerland	Switzerland's Next Topmodel	Puls 8 ProSieben Schweiz	Cycle 1, 2018: Saviour Anosike; Cycle 2, 2019: Gaby Gisler; Cycle 3, 2021: Dennis de Vree	Manuela Frey
Taiwan	Taiwan Supermodel No. 1	TVBS Entertainment Channel	Cycle 1, 2007: He Wan Ting; Cycle 2, 2008: Chen Chu Xiang	Bianca Bai; Kevin Tsai
Thailand	Thailand's Next Top Model	Channel 3	Cycle 1, 2005: You Kheawchaum	Sonia Couling
Turkey	Top Model Türkiye	Star TV	Cycle 1, 2006: Selda Car	Deniz Akkaya
Ukraine	Top Model po-ukrainsky Supermodel po-ukrainsky (cycles 1–3)	Novy TV	Cycle 1, 2014: Alyona Ruban; Cycle 2, 2015: Alina Panyuta; Cycle 3, 2016: Masha Hrebenyuk; Cycle 4, 2017: Samvel Tumanyan; Cycle 5, 2018: Yana Kutishevskaya; Cycle 6, 2019: Malvina Chuklya; Cycle 7, 2020: Tanya Bryk	Alla Kostromichova
United Kingdom & Ireland	Britain's Next Top Model; Britain & Ireland's Next Top Model (cycles 7–9)	Sky Living (cycles 1–9); Lifetime (cycles 10–12)	Cycle 1, 2005: Lucy Ratcliffe; Cycle 2, 2006: Lianna Fowler; Cycle 3, 2007: Lauren McAvoy; Cycle 4, 2008: Alex Evans; Cycle 5, 2009: Mecia Simson; Cycle 6, 2010: Tiffany Pisani; Cycle 7, 2011: Jade Thompson; Cycle 8, 2012: Letitia Herod; Cycle 9, 2013: Lauren Lambert; Cycle 10, 2016: Chloe Keenan; Cycle 11, 2017: Olivia Wardell; Cycle 12, 2017: Ivy Watson	Lisa Butcher (cycle 1); Lisa Snowdon (cycles 2–5); Elle Macpherson (cycles 6–9) (Note: Dave Berry was hosting the live final of Cycle 6 while Elle Macpherson was leading the judging panel.); Abbey Clancy (cycles 10–12) (Note: Cindy Bishop took over the shows hosting duties during the last three episodes of cycle 12, which were filmed overseas in Thailand. Abbey Clancy took a leave of absence from the series after learning she was pregnant.)
United States	America's Next Top Model	UPN (cycles 1–6); The CW (cycles 7–22); VH1 (cycles 23–24)	Cycle 1, 2003: Adrianne Curry; Cycle 2, 2004: Yoanna House; Cycle 3, 2004: Eva Pigford; Cycle 4, 2005: Naima Mora; Cycle 5, 2005: Nicole Linkletter; Cycle 6, 2006: Danielle Evans; Cycle 7, 2006: CariDee English; Cycle 8, 2007: Jaslene Gonzalez; Cycle 9, 2007: Saleisha Stowers; Cycle 10, 2008: Whitney Thompson; Cycle 11, 2008: McKey Sullivan; Cycle 12, 2009: Teyona Anderson; Cycle 13, 2009: Nicole Fox; Cycle 14, 2010: Krista White; Cycle 15, 2010: Ann Ward; Cycle 16, 2011: Brittani Kline; Cycle 17, 2011: Lisa D'Amato; Cycle 18, 2012: Sophie Sumner; Cycle 19, 2012: Laura James; Cycle 20, 2013: Jourdan Miller; Cycle 21, 2014: Keith Carlos; Cycle 22, 2015: Nyle DiMarco; Cycle 23, 2016–2017: India Gants; Cycle 24, 2018: Kyla Coleman	Tyra Banks (cycles 1–22, 24); Rita Ora (cycle 23)
Vietnam	Vietnam's Next Top Model	VTV3	Cycle 1, 2010–2011: Khiếu Thị Huyền Trang; Cycle 2, 2011–2012: Hoàng Thùy; Cycle 3, 2012: Mai Thị Giang; Cycle 4, 2013: Mâu Thị Thanh Thủy; Cycle 5, 2014–2015: Tạ Quang Hùng & Nguyễn Thị Oanh; Cycle 6, 2015: Nguyễn Thị Hương Ly; Cycle 7, 2016: Nguyễn Thị Ngọc Châu; Cycle 8, 2017: Lê Thị Kim Dung; Cycle 9, 2025: Lại Mai Hoa	Vũ Nguyễn Hà Anh (cycle 1) (Note: The series kicked off with an unclear host/head judge position at which Elizabeth Thủy Tiên was initially offered the ultimate power in judges' table and then Nathan Lee fought against her to become another male host of the worldwide Top Model franchise. They were both fired and Vũ Nguyễn Hà Anh was chosen as a replacement. Vũ Anh Tuấn was hosting the live final while the head judge was leading the panel.); Nguyễn Xuân Lan(cycles 2–3, 5); Trương Ngọc Ánh (cycle 8); Phạm Thị Thanh Hằng (cycles 4, 6–7, 9)

Table notes:

=== Winners over time ===
Please note: This is a collapsible table, click [show] to expand and see its contents.

Date Announced	Winner	Region/Country	Franchise	Cycle
July 8, 2003	Adrianne Curry	United States	America's Next Top Model	Cycle 1
March 23, 2004	Yoanna House	United States	America's Next Top Model	Cycle 2
May 2, 2004	Ksenia Kahnovich	Russia	Ty - supermodel	Cycle 1
December 15, 2004	Eva Pigford	United States	America's Next Top Model	Cycle 3
March 1, 2005	Gemma Sanderson	Australia	Australia's Next Top Model	Cycle 1
March 8, 2005	Svetlana Sergienko	Russia	Ty - supermodel	Cycle 2
April 27, 2005	Kine Bakke	Scandinavia	Top Model	Cycle 1
May 18, 2005	Naima Mora	United States	America's Next Top Model	Cycle 4
June 5, 2005	Victoria Katzman	Israel	HaDugmaniot	Cycle 1
August 25, 2005	Alizée Gaillard	France	Top Model	Cycle 1
August 28, 2005	You Kheawchaum	Thailand	Thailand's Next Top Model	Cycle 1
October 15, 2005	Altyn Baekenova	Kazakhstan	Ya krasivaya	Cycle 1
November 17, 2005	Lucy Ratcliffe	United Kingdom	Britain's Next Top Model	Cycle 1
November 21, 2005	Frøydis Elvenes	Scandinavia	Top Model	Cycle 2
December 7, 2005	Nicole Linkletter	United States	America's Next Top Model	Cycle 5
February 17,2005	Loredana Školaris	Slovenia	Slovenia's Next Top Model	Cycle 1
March 21, 2006	Niral Karantinaji	Israel	HaDugmaniot	Cycle 2
March 29, 2006	Lena Gercke	Germany	Germany's Next Topmodel	Cycle 1
April 1, 2006	Tatiana Pekurovskaya	Russia	Ty - supermodel	Cycle 3
May 2, 2006	Freja Kjellberg Borchies	Scandinavia	Top Model	Cycle 3
May 17, 2006	Danielle Evans	United States	America's Next Top Model	Cycle 6
July 19, 2006	Andrea Muizelaar	Canada	Canada's Next Top Model	Cycle 1
September 17, 2006	Selda Car	Turkey	Top Model Türkiye	Cycle 1
September 25, 2006	Lianna Fowler	United Kingdom	Britain's Next Top Model	Cycle 2
October 23, 2006	Sanne Nijhof	Netherlands	Holland's Next Top Model	Cycle 1
November 27, 2006	Maria Eilertsen	Norway	Top Model	Cycle 1
December 6, 2006	CariDee English	United States	America's Next Top Model	Cycle 7
December 22, 2006	Réka Nagy	Hungary	Topmodell	Cycle 1
March 30, 2007	Ivana Honzová	Slovakia	Hľadá sa Supermodelka	Cycle 1
May 14, 2007	Kim Feenstra	Netherlands	Holland's Next Top Model	Cycle 2
May 16, 2007	Jaslene Gonzalez	United States	America's Next Top Model	Cycle 8
May 31, 2007	Barbara Meier	Germany	Germany's Next Topmodel	Cycle 2
June 5, 2007	Alice Burdeu	Australia	Australia's Next Top Model	Cycle 3
June 12, 2007	Grendel Alvarado	Philippines	Philippines' Next Top Model	Cycle 1
July 18, 2007	Rebecca Hardy	Canada	Canada's Next Top Model	Cycle 2
September 3, 2007	Lauren McAvoy	United Kingdom	Britain's Next Top Model	Cycle 3
November 19, 2007	Kamilla Alnes	Norway	Top Model	Cycle 2
December 12, 2007	Hawa Ahmed	Sweden	Top Model	Cycle 1
December 12, 2007	Saleisha Stowers	United States	America's Next Top Model	Cycle 9
December 16, 2007	Hanne Baekelandt	Belgium	Topmodel	Cycle 1
December 17, 2007	Cecile Sinclair	Netherlands	Holland's Next Top Model	Cycle 3
December 19, 2007	Mariana Velho	Brazil	Brazil's Next Top Model	Cycle 1
December 21, 2007	Karen Pillet	France	Top Model	Cycle 2
December 22, 2007	Tatyana Krokhina	Russia	Ty - supermodel	Cycle 4
February 19, 2008	Gilda Sansone	Italy	Italia's Next Top Model	Cycle 1
March 5, 2008	He Wan Ting	Taiwan	Taiwan Supermodel No. 1	Cycle 1
March 23, 2008	Yin Ge	China	China's Next Top Model	Cycle 1
April 22, 2008	Ella Mashkautzen	Israel	HaDugmaniot	Cycle 3
May 14, 2008	Whitney Thompson	United States	America's Next Top Model	Cycle 10
June 1, 2008	Sabina Behlić	Croatia	Hrvatski Top Model	Cycle 1
June 2, 2008	Ananda Lândertine	Netherlands	Holland's Next Top Model	Cycle 4
June 5, 2008	Jennifer Hof	Germany	Germany's Next Topmodel	Cycle 3
June 8, 2008	Ani Alitalo	Finland	Suomen huippumalli haussa	Cycle 1
July 1, 2008	Demelza Reveley	Australia	Australia's Next Top Model	Cycle 4
July 7, 2008	Alex Evans	United Kingdom	Britain's Next Top Model	Cycle 4
July 23, 2008	Chen Chu Xiang	Taiwan	Taiwan Supermodel No. 1	Cycle 2
November 19, 2008	McKey Sullivan	United States	America's Next Top Model	Cycle 11
November 20, 2008	Maíra Vieira	Brazil	Brazil's Next Top Model	Cycle 2
November 24, 2008	Martine Lervik	Norway	Top Model	Cycle 3
December 16, 2008	Michela Maggioni	Italy	Italia's Next Top Model	Cycle 2
December 18, 2008	Virginie Bleyaert	Belgium	Topmodel	Cycle 2
February 9, 2009	Larissa Marolt	Austria	Austria's Next Topmodel	Cycle 1
March 13, 2009	Meng Yao	China	China's Next Top Model	Cycle 2
May 13, 2009	Teyona Anderson	United States	America's Next Top Model	Cycle 12
May 21, 2009	Sara Nuru	Germany	Germany's Next Topmodel	Cycle 4
June 5, 2009	Christobelle Grierson-Ryrie	New Zealand	New Zealand's Next Top Model	Cycle 1
June 15, 2009	Nanna Grundfeldt	Finland	Suomen huippumalli haussa	Cycle 2
July 6, 2009	Mecia Simson	United Kingdom	Britain's Next Top Model	Cycle 5
July 7, 2009	Tahnee Atkinson	Australia	Australia's Next Top Model	Cycle 5
July 14, 2009	Meaghan Waller	Canada	Canada's Next Top Model	Cycle 3
November 16, 2009	Rosalinde Kikstra	Benelux	Benelux' Next Top Model	Cycle 1
November 18, 2009	Nicole Fox	United States	America's Next Top Model	Cycle 13
December 3, 2009	Camila Trindade	Brazil	Brazil's Next Top Model	Cycle 3
December 17, 2009	Mariana Bayón	Mexico	Mexico's Next Top Model	Cycle 1
December 18, 2009	Anastasia Silveri	Italy	Italia's Next Top Model	Cycle 3
February 10, 2010	Aylin Kösetürk	Austria	Austria's Next Topmodel	Cycle 2
February 15, 2010	Seraina Kazamia	Greece	Next Top Model	Cycle 1
May 12, 2010	Krista White	United States	America's Next Top Model	Cycle 14
June 7, 2010	Jenna Kuokkanen	Finland	Suomen huippumalli haussa	Cycle 3
June 10, 2010	Alisar Ailabouni	Germany	Germany's Next Topmodel	Cycle 5
September 4, 2010	Mao Chu Yu	China	China's Next Top Model	Cycle 3
September 28, 2010	Amanda Ware	Australia	Australia's Next Top Model	Cycle 6
October 4, 2010	Tiffany Pisani	United Kingdom	Britain's Next Top Model	Cycle 6
October 29, 2010	Danielle Hayes	New Zealand	New Zealand's Next Top Model	Cycle 2
November 16, 2010	Melissa Baas	Benelux	Benelux' Next Top Model	Cycle 2
November 24, 2010	Caroline Bader	Denmark	Danmarks Næste Topmodel	Cycle 1
November 28, 2010	Rafaela Franić	Croatia	Hrvatski Top Model	Cycle 2
December 1, 2010	Ann Ward	United States	America's Next Top Model	Cycle 15
December 1, 2010	Paulina Papierska	Poland	Top Model. Zostań modelką	Cycle 1
December 11, 2010	Lee Ji-min	South Korea	Korea's Next Top Model	Cycle 1
December 22, 2010	Maja Fučak	Slovenia	Slovenski Top Model	Cycle 1
January 23, 2011	Khiếu Thị Huyền Trang	Vietnam	Vietnam's Next Top Model	Cycle 1
February 21, 2011	Cindy Toli	Greece	Next Top Model	Cycle 2
February 27, 2011	Lydia Obute	Austria	Austria's Next Topmodel	Cycle 3
March 18, 2011	Erida Lama	Albania	Albania's Next Top Model	Cycle 1
April 21, 2011	Emma Dumitrescu	Romania	Next Top Model	Cycle 1
May 2, 2011	Claudia Alette Bull	Norway	Top Model	Cycle 4
May 18, 2011	Brittani Kline	United States	America's Next Top Model	Cycle 16
May 22, 2011	Mariya Lesovaya	Russia	Top Model po-russki	Cycle 1
June 6, 2011	Neda Stojanović	Serbia	Srpski Top Model	Cycle 1
June 9, 2011	Jana Beller	Germany	Germany's Next Topmodel	Cycle 6
June 15, 2011	Alice Taticchi	Italy	Italia's Next Top Model	Cycle 4
September 2, 2011	Brigette Thomas	New Zealand	New Zealand's Next Top Model	Cycle 3
September 14, 2011	Greis Drenn	Albania	Albania's Next Top Model	Cycle 2
September 26, 2011	Jade Thompson	United Kingdom and Ireland	Britain & Ireland's Next Top Model	Cycle 7
October 1, 2011	Jin Jung-sun	South Korea	Korea's Next Top Model	Cycle 2
October 25, 2011	Montana Cox	Australia	Australia's Next Top Model	Cycle 7
November 6, 2011	Katya Bagrova	Russia	Top Model po-russki	Cycle 2
November 8, 2011	Tracy Reuss	Mexico	Mexico's Next Top Model	Cycle 2
November 14, 2011	Tamara Weijenberg	Netherlands	Holland's Next Top Model	Cycle 5
November 24, 2011	Julie Nyman Hasselby	Denmark	Danmarks Næste Topmodel	Cycle 2
November 28, 2011	Anna-Sofia Ali-Sisto	Finland	Suomen huippumalli haussa	Cycle 4
December 7, 2011	Lisa D'Amato	United States	America's Next Top Model	Cycle 17
December 7, 2011	Olga Kaczyńska	Poland	Top Model. Zostań modelką	Cycle 2
December 22, 2011	Laura Giurcanu	Romania	Next Top Model	Cycle 2
January 8, 2012	Hoàng Thị Thùy	Vietnam	Vietnam's Next Top Model	Cycle 2
March 11, 2012	Antonia Hausmair	Austria	Austria's Next Topmodel	Cycle 4
April 10, 2012	Alice Herbst	Sweden	Top Model Sverige	Cycle 2
May 27, 2012	Tatyana Kozuto	Russia	Top Model po-russki	Cycle 3
May 30, 2012	Sophie Sumner	United States	America's Next Top Model	Cycle 18
June 5, 2012	Helina Metsik	Estonia	Eesti tippmodell	Cycle 1
June 7, 2012	Luisa Hartema	Germany	Germany's Next Topmodel	Cycle 7
October 1, 2012	Letitia Herod	United Kingdom and Ireland	Britain & Ireland's Next Top Model	Cycle 8
October 20, 2012	Choi So-ra	South Korea	Korea's Next Top Model	Cycle 3
November 16, 2012	Laura James	United States	America's Next Top Model	Cycle 19
November 19, 2012	Meri Ikonen	Finland	Suomen huippumalli haussa	Cycle 5
November 20, 2012	Sahily Cordova	Mexico	Mexico's Next Top Model	Cycle 3
November 22, 2012	Line Rehkopff	Denmark	Danmarks Næste Topmodel	Cycle 3
November 25, 2012	Mai Thị Giang	Vietnam	Vietnam's Next Top Model	Cycle 3
December 1, 2012	Yulya Farhutdinova	Russia	Top Model po-russki	Cycle 4
December 27, 2012	Ramona Popescu	Romania	Next Top Model (Romanian TV series)	Cycle 3
February 1, 2013	Mónica Castaño	Colombia	Colombia's Next Top Model	Cycle 1
February 17, 2013	Jessica Amornkuldilok Thailand	Far East	Asia's Next Top Model	Cycle 1
March 3, 2013	Greta Uszkai	Austria	Austria's Next Topmodel	Cycle 5
March 25, 2013	Josefin Gustafsson	Sweden	Top Model Sverige	Cycle 3
May 27, 2013	Treveen Stewart	Caribbean	Caribbean's Next Top Model	Cycle 1
May 30, 2013	Lovelyn Enebechi	Germany	Germany's Next Topmodel	Cycle 8
June 5, 2013	Zuza Kołodziejczyk	Poland	Top Model. Zostań modelką	Cycle 3
September 5, 2013	Lauren Lambert	United Kingdom and Ireland	Britain & Ireland's Next Top Model	Cycle 9
September 24, 2013	Melissa Juratowitch	Australia	Australia's Next Top Model	Cycle 8
October 21, 2013	Nikki Steigenga	Netherlands	Holland's Next Top Model	Cycle 6
November 4, 2013	Paloma Aguilar	Mexico	Mexico's Next Top Model	Cycle 4
November 7, 2013	Shin Hyun-ji	South Korea	Korea's Next Top Model	Cycle 4
November 15, 2013	Jourdan Miller	United States	America's Next Top Model	Cycle 20
November 21, 2013	Louise Mørck Mikkelsen	Denmark	Danmarks Næste Topmodel	Cycle 4
November 23, 2013	Danea Panta	Peru	Peru's Next Top Model	Cycle 1
December 2, 2013	Frida Børli Solaker	Norway	Top Model Norge	Cycle 5
December 22, 2013	Mâu Thị Thanh Thủy	Vietnam	Vietnam's Next Top Model	Cycle 4
December 28, 2013	Wang Xiao Qian	China	China's Next Top Model	Cycle 4
January 12, 2014	Aamito Lagum Uganda	Africa	Africa's Next Top Model	Cycle 1
January 13, 2014	Sandra Ude	Estonia	Eesti tippmodell	Cycle 2
February 7, 2014	Yuriko Londoño	Colombia	Colombia's Next Top Model	Cycle 2
April 9, 2014	Sheena Liam Malaysia	Far East	Asia's Next Top Model	Cycle 2
May 1, 2014	Feben Negash	Sweden	Top Model Sverige	Cycle 4
May 8, 2014	Stefanie Giesinger	Germany	Germany's Next Topmodel	Cycle 9
October 27, 2014	Nicky Opheij	Netherlands	Holland's Next Top Model	Cycle 7
November 1, 2014	Hwang Kibbeum	South Korea	Korea's Next Top Model	Cycle 5
November 22, 2014	Alena Ruban	Ukraine	Supermodel po-ukrainsky	Cycle 1
November 24, 2014	Osi Ugonoh	Poland	Top Model	Cycle 4
November 27, 2014	Sarah Kildevæld Madsen	Denmark	Danmarks Næste Topmodel	Cycle 5
December 4, 2014	Aule Õun	Estonia	Eesti tippmodell	Cycle 3
December 4, 2014	Oliver Stummvoll	Austria	Austria's Next Topmodel	Cycle 6
December 5, 2014	Keith Carlos	United States	America's Next Top Model	Cycle 21
December 15, 2014	Vanessa Ponce	Mexico	Mexico's Next Top Model	Cycle 5
December 28, 2014	Evgeniya Nekrasova	Russia	Top Model po-russki	Cycle 5
January 17, 2015	Nguyễn Thị Oanh	Vietnam	Vietnam's Next Top Model	Cycle 5
January 17, 2015	Tạ Quang Hùng	Vietnam	Vietnam's Next Top Model	Cycle 5
March 27, 2015	Chan Kong Kar	Cambodia	Cambodia's Next Top Model	Cycle 1
May 28, 2015	Vanessa Fuchs	Germany	Germany's Next Topmodel	Cycle 10
June 17, 2015	Ayu Gani Indonesia	Far East	Asia's Next Top Model	Cycle 3
July 2, 2015	Brittany Beattie	Australia	Australia's Next Top Model	Cycle 9
August 6, 2015	Li Si Jia	China	China's Next Top Model	Cycle 5
September 27, 2015	Danielle Canute	India	India's Next Top Model	Cycle 1
October 11, 2015	Nguyễn Thị Hương Ly	Vietnam	Vietnam's Next Top Model	Cycle 6
October 26, 2015	Loiza Lamers	Netherlands	Holland's Next Top Model	Cycle 8
November 4, 2015	Daniel Kildevæld Madsen	Denmark	Danmarks Næste Topmodel	Cycle 6
November 30, 2015	Radek Pestka	Poland	Top Model	Cycle 5
December 4, 2015	Nyle DiMarco	United States	America's Next Top Model	Cycle 22
December 4, 2015	Alina Panyuta	Ukraine	Supermodel po-ukrainsky	Cycle 2
December 22, 2015	Kittisha Doyle	Caribbean	Caribbean's Next Top Model	Cycle 2
January 19, 2016	Fabian Herzgsell	Austria	Austria's Next Topmodel	Cycle 7
February 29, 2016	Kätlin Hallik	Estonia	Eesti tippmodell	Cycle 4
March 17, 2016	Chloe Keenan	United Kingdom and Ireland	Britain's Next Top Model	Cycle 10
May 12, 2016	Kim Hnizdo	Germany	Germany's Next Topmodel	Cycle 11
June 1, 2016	Tawan Kedkong Thailand	Far East	Asia's Next Top Model	Cycle 4
September 18, 2016	Pranati Prakash	India	India's Next Top Model	Cycle 2
October 2, 2016	Nguyễn Thị Ngọc Châu	Vietnam	Vietnam's Next Top Model	Cycle 7
October 25, 2016	Akke Marije Marinus	Netherlands	Holland's Next Top Model	Cycle 9
November 16, 2016	Ronja Manfredsson	Scandinavia	Top Model Curves	Cycle 1
November 22, 2016	Aleyna FitzGerald	Australia	Australia's Next Top Model	Cycle 10
November 29, 2016	Patryk Grudowicz	Poland	Top Model	Cycle 6
December 2, 2016	Masha Hrebenyuk	Ukraine	Supermodel po-ukrainsky	Cycle 3
February 10, 2017	Alejandra Merlano	Colombia	Colombia's Next Top Model	Cycle 3
March 8, 2017	India Gants	United States	America's Next Top Model	Cycle 23
March 12, 2017	Tserendolgor Battsengel	Mongolia	Mongolia's Next Top Model	Cycle 1
April 3, 2017	Shamique Simms	Caribbean	Caribbean's Next Top Model	Cycle 3
May 17, 2017	Jerry Koivisto	Finland	Suomen huippumalli haussa	Cycle 6
May 18, 2017	Olivia Wardell	United Kingdom and Ireland	Britain's Next Top Model	Cycle 11
May 25, 2017	Céline Bethmann	Germany	Germany's Next Topmodel	Cycle 12
May 30, 2017	Angela Lehmann	Philippines	Philippines' Next Top Model	Cycle 2
June 28, 2017	Maureen Wroblewitz	Far East	Asia's Next Top Model	Cycle 5
September 10, 2017	Lê Thị Kim Dung	Vietnam	Vietnam's Next Top Model	Cycle 8
October 30, 2017	Montell van Leijen	Netherlands	Holland's Next Top Model	Cycle 10
December 16, 2017	Riya Subodh	India	India's Next Top Model	Cycle 3
December 21, 2017	Ivy Watson	United Kingdom and Ireland	Britain's Next Top Model	Cycle 12
December 21, 2017	Isak Omorodion	Austria	Austria's Next Topmodel	Cycle 8
December 29, 2017	Samvel Tumanyan	Ukraine	Top Model po-ukrainsky	Cycle 4
April 7, 2018	Mahir Pandhi	India	Top Model India	Cycle 1
April 10, 2018	Kyla Coleman	United States	America's Next Top Model	Cycle 24
April 25, 2018	Le Shae Riley	Caribbean	Caribbean's Next Top Model	Cycle 4
May 24, 2018	Toni Dreher-Adenuga	Germany	Germany's Next Topmodel	Cycle 13
October 22, 2018	Soufyan Gnini	Netherlands	Holland's Next Top Model	Cycle 11
October 24, 2018	Dana Slosar	Far East	Asia's Next Top Model	Cycle 6
November 23, 2018	Saviour Chibueze Anosike	Switzerland	Switzerland's Next Topmodel	Cycle 1
November 26, 2018	Kasia Szklarczyk	Poland	Top Model (Poland)	Cycle 7
December 8, 2018	Urvi Shetty	India	India's Next Top Model	Cycle 4
December 19, 2018	Noune Kazaryan	Greece	Greece's Next Top Model	Cycle 1
December 28, 2018	Yana Kutishevska	Ukraine	Top Model po-ukrainsky	Cycle 5
January 20, 2019	Anujin Baynerdene	Mongolia	Mongolia's Next Top Model	Cycle 2
January 20, 2019	Chamia Chimedtseren †	Mongolia	Mongolia's Next Top Model	Cycle 2
May 23, 2019	Simone Kowalski	Germany	Germany's Next Topmodel	Cycle 14
November 5, 2019	Taibeh Ahmadi	Austria	Austria's Next Topmodel	Cycle 9
November 22, 2019	Gabriela Gisler	Switzerland	Switzerland's Next Topmodel	Cycle 2
November 25, 2019	Dawid Woskanian	Poland	Top Model	Cycle 8
December 16, 2019	Marcus Hansma	Netherlands	Holland's Next Top Model	Cycle 12
December 19, 2019	Anna Maria Iliadou	Greece	Greece's Next Top Model	Cycle 2
December 19, 2019	Katia Tarabanko	Greece	Greece's Next Top Model	Cycle 2
December 27, 2019	Malvina Chuklya	Ukraine	Top Model po-ukrainsky	Cycle 6
May 21, 2020	Jacky Wruck	Germany	Germany's Next Topmodel	Cycle 15
November 25, 2020	Mikołaj Śmieszek	Poland	Top Model	Cycle 9
December 15, 2020	Hercules Chuzinov	Greece	Greece's Next Top Model	Cycle 3
December 21, 2020	Tanya Brik	Ukraine	Top Model po-ukrainsky	Cycle 7
April 9, 2021	Ilene Kurniawan	Indonesia	Indonesia's Next Top Model	Cycle 1
May 27, 2021	Alex-Mariah Peter	Germany	Germany's Next Topmodel	Cycle 16
June 6, 2021	Tina Tova	Russia	Ty - Topmodel	Cycle 1
November 3, 2021	Dennis de Vree	Switzerland	Switzerland's Next Topmodel	Cycle 3
November 24, 2021	Dominika Wysocka	Poland	Top Model	Cycle 10
December 20, 2021	Kyvéli Hatziefstratiou	Greece	Greece's Next Top Model	Cycle 4
January 9, 2022	Hanna Buyankhishig	Mongolia	The Models	Cycle 3
March 18, 2022	Sarah Tumiwa	Indonesia	Indonesia's Next Top Model	Cycle 2
May 26, 2022	Lou-Anne Gleissenebner	Germany	Germany's Next Topmodel	Cycle 17
November 14, 2022	Lando van der Schee	Netherlands	Holland's Next Top Model	Cycle 13
November 17, 2022	Jarrah Kollei	Finland	Suomen huippumalli haussa	Cycle 7
December 7, 2022	Klaudia Nieścior	Poland	Top Model	Cycle 11
December 23, 2022	Aléksia Trajko	Greece	Greece's Next Top Model	Cycle 5
March 26, 2023	Iko Bustomi	Indonesia	Indonesia's Next Top Model	Cycle 3
June 15, 2023	Vivien Blotzki	Germany	Germany's Next Topmodel	Cycle 18
November 10, 2023	Gilles Verbruggen	Belgium	Belgium's Next Top Model	Cycle 1
November 25, 2023	Dominik Szymański	Poland	Top Model	Cycle 12
June 2, 2024	Lili Mészáros	Hungary	Next Top Model Hungary	Cycle 1
June 13, 2024	Jermaine Kokoú Kothe	Germany	Germany's Next Topmodel	Cycle 19
June 13, 2024	Lea Oude Engberink	Germany	Germany's Next Topmodel	Cycle 19
September 6, 2024	Bréseïs Simons	Belgium	Belgium's Next Top Model	Cycle 2
November 20, 2024	Klaudia Zioberczyk	Poland	Top Model	Cycle 13
December 2, 2024	Gitte van Elst	Netherlands	Holland's Next Top Model	Cycle 14
June 19, 2025	Daniela Djokić	Germany	Germany's Next Topmodel	Cycle 20
June 19, 2025	Moritz Rüdiger	Germany	Germany's Next Topmodel	Cycle 20
October 12, 2025	Lại Mai Hoa	Vietnam	Vietnam's Next Top Model	Cycle 9
November 19, 2025	Michał Kot	Poland	Top Model	Cycle 14
December 19, 2025	Xenia Tsirkova	Greece	Greece's Next Top Model	Cycle 6
May 28, 2026	Aurélie Siewitz	Germany	Germany's Next Topmodel	Cycle 21
May 28, 2026	Ibo Ouro-Bodi	Germany	Germany's Next Topmodel	Cycle 21

== Current and upcoming cycles ==
The following table contains current and upcoming cycles of Top Model listed in chronological order.

Currently airing

Show	Cycle	Premiere	Day(s)	Host	No. of contestants	Channel
Top Model	15	September 2, 2026	Wednesday	Joanna Krupa	17	TVN
Greece's Next Top Model	7	September 21, 2026	Monday & Tuesday	Iliana Papageorgiou	22	Star Channel
America's Next Top Model	25	TBA	TBA	Tyra Banks	TBA	TBA
Germany's Next Topmodel	22	2027	Thursday	Heidi Klum	44	ProSieben

== See also ==
- List of television show franchises
