= Suomen huippumalli haussa season 2 =

Suomen huippumalli haussa
- Season 2
- Presented by: Anne Kukkohovi
- Judges: Anne Kukkohovi; Saimi Hoyer; Sakari Majantie
- Location: Helsinki, Finland

Release
- Original network: Nelonen
- Original release: 13 April 2009 – June 15, 2009

Season chronology
- ← Previous; Season 1 Next → Season 3

The second season of Suomen huippumalli haussa began filming in the Autumn of 2008 and began airing 13 April 2009 at 20.00 on the Finnish channel Nelonen. The prize for the winner was a contract with Paparazzi Model Management, the front cover of Finnish Cosmopolitan and becoming the new spokesperson for Max Factor.

Nanna Grundfeldt won the competition, with Riina Roms and Anna-Kaisa Tyrväinen sharing second place. Grundfeldt is the first out lesbian to win any of the over 30 versions of Top Model around the world, including the original.

Self-proclaimed "supermodel" Janice Dickinson was a guest judge on the show for episode 7. She was in Helsinki for filming in November 2008. Tommi Kilponen, of Finland's version of Queer Eye for the Straight Guy, is this season's stylist.

== Episode summaries ==
=== "Premiere" ===
Original airdate: April 13, 2009

20 semifinalists are chosen for casting and walk in an Andiamo runway show to compete for being contestants. There were supposed to be 10 final contestants, but the panel (Anne Kukkohovi, Saimi Hoyer, and Sakari Majantie) decided to take 11 instead.

=== "Makeovers" ===
Original airdate: April 20, 2009

The girls move into their new house and get a visit from Anne Kukkohovi and then a catwalk lesson by drag queen Jarkko Valtee. The girls then get makeovers. The week's photos shoot is for a DNA campaign in which the girls are dressed as chess pieces. The girls either play the white or black queen with the winner expressing pride and the loser expressing anger.

- First call-out: Inka Tuominen
- Bottom two: Essi Hellstén & Suvi
- Eliminated: Essi Hellstén

=== "Skunk Girls" ===
Original airdate: April 27, 2009

This week's theme is health. The girls do a photo shoot for the Skunk Girl collection by Tiia Vanhatapio for the www.fressis.fi anti-smoking campaign. The following day, a personal trainer comes to visit and does a body assessment of the models and a workout with Nike gear. Next, a nutritionist visits the model house and gives the challenge of preparing a healthy snack. Nanna wins the challenge and chooses Laura, who had earlier hurt her leg. The reward is a day at the spa, but due to the injury, Laura cannot go, so Nanna chooses Blanche to go instead. The rest of the girls must clean up the house. The final assignment is filming Nelonen Jatkuu segments, which on Finnish television are seen before and after commercial breaks.

- First call-out: Riina Roms
- Bottom two: Inka Tuominen & Laura Merkel
- Eliminated: Inka Tuominen

=== "Girls That Fight" ===
Original airdate: May 4, 2009

Tensions at the house rise up, especially when everyone thinks that Blanche wants to be the center of attention. The girls go to a dance studio to practice movement. Janina wins the challenge and chooses Laura and Nanna to share in her prize: designing personalized Nike sneakers. The week's photo shoot is for Nike where the models must jump on a trampoline all the while showing body control. As it turned out, the first six models' photos did not come out, so they had to do it over again. Although Blanche is seen to be the diva in the house, Ida's non-presence in the competition leads to her elimination.

- First call-out: Riina Roms
- Bottom two: Blanche & Ida Piipari
- Eliminated: Ida Piipari

=== "Girls That Have the Look" ===
Original airdate: May 11, 2009

The week starts with the girls receiving a Polaroid camera to practice taking beauty shots. Judge Saimi Hoyer drops by and gives critiques and advice on the Polaroids. Next comes a lesson in make-up, in which the challenge is to prepare an evening look in 10 minutes. Blanche wins the make-up challenge and chooses Anastassia and Suvi to join in her prize: an evening with socialite queen of Finland Kaarina Kivilahti with champagne and caviar served with blinis. The photo shoot for the week is for a Max Factor campaign with an emphasis on intensity in the face. For the photo shoot, the models are wearing the Pisto summer collection by Annika Rantala. After the shoot, the girls model the collection in a boutique fashion show. At elimination, Anastassia is criticised for not being versatile, only having one expression, and is sent home. Immediately after elimination, Anne Kukkohovi gives the girls a hint that they should pack their bags for a trip.

- First call-out: Nanna Grundfeldt
- Bottom two: Anastassia Grishina & Riina Roms
- Eliminated: Anastassia Grishina

=== "The Girl That Got a Boy for a Gift" ===
Original airdate: May 18, 2009

The girls head off to Paris and meet model and artist Sanna Saastamoinen. In Paris, they go for casting at modeling agency Metropolitan. Afterwards, they meet with an actor claiming to be a modeling agency representative. The actor meets with each girl giving them harsh criticisms, then reveals that it was a test to see how much negative criticism they can stand. Back home, Anna-Kaisa gets a surprise visit from her little son Joose. The week's photo shoot is for Frozen chewing gum and the girls are asked to express their true selves and write a message, expressing the message in the black and white advertisement. Even though she didn't deliver in the photo, Riina was given a third chance and Blanche, who was hoping to make it to the top five, was eliminated.

Model	Message
Anna-Kaisa	I'm a proud mother
Blanche	I dare not cry in public
Janina	I love you dad
Laura	I am proud of myself
Nanna	Gay
Riina	I want to go beyond my limit
Suvi	I'd like to say no

- First call-out: Janina
- Bottom two: Blanche & Riina Roms
- Eliminated: Blanche

=== "The Girls and the Disastrous Dinner" ===
Original airdate: May 25, 2009

The models go to a photo shoot for the chameleon line of Bellinger eyewear where they must pose with a live chameleon. The product manager chooses Nanna as the best and rewards her with a €500 Synsam gift card. At home, the girls receive Anne Mail stating that they will have a special international guest. After guessing Tyra Banks and Miss J. Alexander, Janice Dickinson shows up at the front door. During her visit, Janice yells at Janina for being a slob and praises Suvi for being perfect. At dinner, where wine is served, Janice is becoming more and more incomprehensible. She leaves the table and falls down the stairs, screaming that her right leg and head are in pain. Janice demands that the girls call an ambulance, all the while yelling that the models are stupid and don't do anything but pose. The hospital claims that there are no visible injuries and there is no need to admit her. The next day, Janice returns to the house asking for forgiveness for her behavior. She claims to have accidentally taken a sleeping aid instead of vitamin c before dinner, which, when mixed with champagne, had a vulgar effect on her. The next photo shoot is a spread for Finnish fashion magazine Gloria, in which the models are wearing expensive jewelry. During elimination, Janice suggests that Riina cut off her hair and that Laura is just a catalogue model.

- First call-out: Janina
- Bottom two: Laura Merkel & Suvi
- Eliminated: Laura Merkel

=== "The Girl Who Got a Hair Cut" ===
Original airdate: June 1, 2009

The girls travel to Gran Canaria. At first the girls are unimpressed by their surroundings, but are wowed by their luxurious hotel. Stylist Tommy Kilponen arrives with clothing from Vero Moda that they must divide between each other. Later in the evening, the girls are welcomed by the owner of the hotel and receive mail from their tourist guide telling them they will have a tour of the island the next day. During the tour, the girls meet up with judge Saimi Hoyer at a church in a small town and challenges the girls: they must walk on a cobblestone street for as long as they can with raw eggs taped to their heels. To everyone's surprise, Nanna wins the challenge despite having previously struggled with her walk. Later that night per Janice Dickinson's suggestion, Riina has her hair cut into a short bob. The following day, the girls have a photo shoot by the pool with a male model called Hector. Janina developed a bit of a crush on the model, but her photos turned out sub par, while Nanna produced good photos despite being nervous about having to look sexy while posing with a man. In the end, Riina and Nanna were chosen as the best of the day and each received a jewelry prize. The following day, the girls have another photo shoot for Bonaqua on sand dunes, despite almost getting hit by a rainstorm. At elimination, Suvi receives criticism for her lack of contact and body control, Anna-Kaisa was seen as being too safe and Janina was found to be good in front of the camera but not necessarily a model. After a brief complaint from Janina that the judges have been forgiving Suvi too much in wake of her shy demeanor, the judges decide to send both Suvi and Janina home.

- First call-out: Riina Roms
- Bottom two: Janina & Suvi
- Eliminated: Janina & Suvi

=== "Girls Fit For a Funeral" ===
Original airdate: June 8, 2009

Still in Gran Canaria, the models meet one on one with Anne. Anne asks each girl what they think about the competition and how they are doing. The final three then head off to do a group photo in which they are portraying funeral goers, dressed in black. When getting of the bus, Nanna trips on her high heels and falls, ripping her stockings, however, doesn't get hurt. The girls then head off for a fun night at an amusement park. The week's photo shoot is a 1930s sepia tone look with a male model shooting the girls with an antique camera. Problems occur when the photographer is not pleased with the look of the male model that arrives. The modeling agency quickly finds a replacement with whom the photographer is satisfied. After the assignment, the girls get Anne Mail saying that elimination will be in back Finland. Back home, the final three discover how empty the house is without the other girls. After a tough deliberation, and Nanna and Riina being in the bottom two, Anne announces that all the girls will be in the finals.

- First call-out: Anna-Kaisa Tyrväinen
- Bottom two: Nanna Grundtfeld & Riina Roms
- Eliminated: No one

=== "The Girl for the Cosmopolitan Cover!" ===
Original airdate: 15 June 2009

The final three reminisce about their journey to the finale. The models first go to a photo shoot for their comp cards. Next, they meet with Finnish Cosmopolitan to shoot for the cover. At the final judging, the judges express that each model in her own right is deserving of being in the top three. Immediately after that, Nanna is chosen as the winner.

- Final three: Anna-Kaisa Tyrväinen, Nanna Grundtfeld & Riina Roms
- Finland's Next Top Model: Nanna Grundtfeld

== Contestants ==
(ages stated are at start of contest)

Contestant	Age	Height	Hometown	Finish	Place
Essi Hellstén	19	1.73 m (5 ft 8 in)	Uusikaupunki	Episode 2	11
Inka Tuominen †	19	1.75 m (5 ft 9 in)	Vantaa	Episode 3	10
Ida Piipari	21	1.77 m (5 ft 9 1/2 in)	Kotka	Episode 4	9
Anastassia Grishina	22	1.72 m (5 ft 7 1/2 in)	Lapua	Episode 5	8
Blanche Malaka	21	1.78 m (5 ft 10 in)	Helsinki	Episode 6	7
Laura Merkel	21	1.79 m (5 ft 10 1/2 in)	Lahti	Episode 7	6
Suvi Jokipii	19	1.81 m (5 ft 11 1/2 in)	Hämeenkyrö	Episode 8	5–4
Janina Stjernvall	20	1.68 m (5 ft 6 in)	Helsinki	Episode 8	5–4
Riina Roms	22	1.74 m (5 ft 8 1/2 in)	Jurva	Episode 10	3–2
Anna-Kaisa Tyrväinen	25	1.80 m (5 ft 11 in)	Joroinen	Episode 10	3–2
Nanna Grundfeldt	24	1.77 m (5 ft 9 1/2 in)	Espoo	Episode 10	1

== Summaries ==
=== Call-out order ===
Order	Episodes								
Order	2	3	4	5	6	7	8	9	10
1	Inka	Riina	Riina	Nanna	Janina	Janina	Riina	Anna-Kaisa	Nanna
2	Anna-Kaisa	Janina	Laura	Suvi	Nanna	Riina	Nanna	Nanna	Anna-Kaisa; Riina
3	Blanche	Blanche	Anna-Kaisa	Janina	Anna-Kaisa	Nanna	Anna-Kaisa	Riina	Anna-Kaisa; Riina
4	Nanna	Anna-Kaisa	Janina	Laura	Suvi	Anna-Kaisa	Janina; Suvi		
5	Riina	Anastassia	Suvi	Anna-Kaisa	Laura	Suvi	Janina; Suvi		
6	Ida	Nanna	Anastassia	Blanche	Riina	Laura			
7	Anastassia	Suvi	Nanna	Riina	Blanche				
8	Laura	Ida	Blanche	Anastassia					
9	Janina	Laura	Ida						
10	Suvi	Inka							
11	Essi								

The contestant was eliminated
The contestant was part of a non-elimination bottom two
The contestant won the competition

- In episode 1, the group of 20 girls was reduced to 11 who moved on to the main competition
- Episode 9 featured a non-elimination bottom-two.

=== Photo shoot guide ===
- Episode 1 photo shoot: Beauty shots (casting)
- Episode 2 photo shoot: DNA campaign
- Episode 3 photo shoot & video shoot: Skunk girl anti-smoking campaign; Nelonen Jatkuu segments
- Episode 4 photo shoot: Nike
- Episode 5 photo shoot: Max Factor beauty shots
- Episode 6 photo shoot: Frozen chewing gum
- Episode 7 photo shoot: Bellinger eyewear with lizard; beauty shoot with jewelry
- Episode 8 photo shoot: Bikini at the pool with male model; Bonaqua campaign on sand
- Episode 9 photo shoot: Funeral editorial; Old 1930s
- Episode 10 photo shoots: Model comp cards; Cosmopolitan covers
