= Suomen huippumalli haussa season 1 =

Suomen huippumalli haussa
- Season 1
- Presented by: Anne Kukkohovi
- Judges: Anne Kukkohovi; Saimi Hoyer; Sakari Majantie
- Location: Helsinki, Finland

Release
- Original network: Nelonen
- Original release: 6 April 2008 – June 8, 2008

Season chronology
- Next → Season 2

Cycle one of Suomen huippumalli haussa premiered on Sunday, April 6, 2008, on the Finnish channel Nelonen. The last episode aired on June 8, 2008. The winner for cycle one, Ani Alitalo, was awarded a €25,000 contract with Paparazzi Model Management, the front cover of Finnish Cosmopolitan and became a spokesperson for Max Factor.

== Episode summaries ==
=== The First Steps Of Models In Training (Mallikokelaiden Ensiaskeleet) ===
Original airdate: April 6, 2008

The girls move into their new house and meet the judges. Saimi Hoyer gives a catwalk lesson and the girls' first challenge is a Vero Moda spring 2008 show. Tatjana, however, did not participate due to her mother's funeral. In the end, Mariem is sent home due to the judges feeling she was too intimidated by the competition.

- Bottom two: Daniela & Mariem
- Eliminated: Mariem

=== Dolls Get Up To Speed (Nukkeneidit Vauhdissa) ===
Original airdate: April 13, 2008

The girls had their makeovers. After the makeovers, the girls had a makeup challenge to create a casting look in ten minutes. Anu won the challenge and chose Darina and Maria to go shopping with her while the other girls cleaned the house. The girls then had a photoshoot at the Helsinki Opera House, where they portrayed different dolls amongst the opera house mannequins. Each girl was given only twenty minutes to pose, adding the emphasis on being quick to take on a role.

- Challenge winner: Anu Jussila

Model	Doll
Ana	Happy
Ani	Dead
Anu	Evil
Armi	Feminine & noble
Daniela	Noble
Darina	Manly, raunchy & sexy
Manon	Dramatic
Mari	Wooden
Maria	Fragile & refined
Marje	Masculine
Tatjana	Dramatic

At panel, Manon was praised for her courage in front of the camera despite struggling somewhat, and both Daniela and Mari were applauded for their creativity on set.

- Bottom two: Armi & Darina
- Eliminated: Armi

=== Speed And Dangerous Situations (Vauhtia Ja Vaarallisia Tilanteita) ===
Original airdate: April 20, 2008

The girls are cheered up by two handsome young personal trainers visiting the house. Each girl gets some time with the trainers to talk about nutrition and fitness, and many of the girls are revealed to have rather unhealthy and irregular lifestyles. Finnish model Leena Sarvi visits the girls, giving them advice on handling demanding companies and situations. The challenge for this episode was a photo shoot on a trampoline. Each girl was asked to jump on the trampoline for ten minutes while simultaneously posing for the camera. Winners Marje and Ana were treated to a beauty spa treatment.

- Challenge winners: Marje & Ana

The photoshoot for the episode was sporty. The girls were asked to pose for a catalog while seated on a mountain bike suspended in the air by wires. At judging, Darina and Daniela gained the most positive feedback for their pictures. The bottom two were Mari and Manon. Manon was sent home after stating she didn't want to be a top model.

- Bottom two: Mari & Manon
- Eliminated: Manon

=== Art And Creativity (Taidetta Ja Luovuutta) ===
Original airdate: April 27, 2008

The girls get creative and make dresses out of garbage bags, aluminum foil and duct tape while getting advice from judge Saimi Hoyer on editorial poses. British photographer John Lander shoots for a Cosmopolitan fashion shoot with the theme of modern art and the artist's muse. With the fashion editor, Darina, Ani, and Maria are chosen as the best and get to continue with more photographs.

- Bottom two: Daniela & Tatjana
- Eliminated: Daniela

=== Episode 5 ===
Original airdate: May 4, 2008

The girls get a surprise visit and a runway walk lesson from special guest judge Miss J. Alexander. Jaana Saarinen teaches the girls about improvisational acting. Anne Kukkohovi directs a beauty shoot, shot by fellow judge Sakari Majantie, giving the models a specific characteristic to express. Ofer Amir photographs the girls for a Bonaqua ad campaign.

Model	Characteristic
Ana	Arrogant
Ani	Sorrowful
Anu	Feminine & sensual
Mari	Aggressive
Maria	Domineering
Marje	Sensitive & poetic
Darina	Wild & crazy
Tatjana	Flirty

- Bottom two: Marje & Tatjana
- Eliminated: Tatjana

=== Episode 6 ===
Original airdate: May 11, 2008

The girls do a commercial for Magnum ice cream, directed by Miikka Lommi. After getting their picture portfolios at Paparazzi Modeling Agency, the girls go to Stockholm, Sweden for casting tests.

- Bottom two: Mari & Marje
- Eliminated: Marje

=== Episode 7 ===
Original airdate: May 18, 2008

The girls fly north to Ylläs in Lapland where they face numerous challenges dealing with perseverance. The first challenge is a photo shoot in a sauna on a ski lift in pairs, showing that each girl can work well with others.

- Challenge winners: Ani Alitalo & Darina Shved

Next is the photo shoot for judging, posing as a Lapland witch in a reindeer skin bikini with a husky. The last challenge is a runway show on the snow wearing Lapland designs. Both Ana’s and Mari’s photos were a disappointment and because of Ana’s complaints about her fears and Mari’s inability to cooperate, both girls are sent home.

- Bottom two: Ana & Mari
- Eliminated: Ana & Mari

=== Episode 8 ===
Original airdate: May 25, 2008

The girls get a lesson in pole dancing. Darina wins the challenge and chooses Mari to share her prize: mountain bikes from Hobby Hall.

- Challenge winner: Darina Shved

The girls are then sent to be in ex-model Kim Herold's first music video Social Butterfly. Next, the girls are photographed as 50s Hollywood film stars, where the goal is to portray attractiveness.

- Bottom two: Anu Jussila & Darina Shved
- Eliminated: Anu Jussila

=== Episode 9 ===
Original airdate: June 1, 2008

The top three head to Turkey where they meet Tommy Kilponen, from Sillä silmällä, the Finnish version of Queer Eye For the Straight Guy. They must go to a local bazaar to find for the first photo shoot on the beach. In the second photo shoot, directed by Anne Kukkohovi, the girls portrayed Greek goddesses. The last one was a swimsuit photo shoot. All photography was shot by Sakari Majantie.

Model	Goddess
Ani	Athena
Darina	Hera
Maria	Aphrodite

- Bottom two: Ani Alitalo & Maria Rytkönen
- Eliminated: Maria Rytkönen

=== Episode 10 ===
Original airdate: June 8, 2008

Still in Turkey, Sakari Majantie photographs the two finalists at the hotel pool. The challenge is to show that they can work in an environment with background distractions. Back in Finland, Paparazzi Modelling Agency conducts interviews with the finalists. The final photo shoot with Max Factor helps determine the winner of the competition.

- Final two: Ani Alitalo & Darina Shved
- Finland's Next Top Model: Ani Alitalo

== Contestants ==
(ages are stated at start of contest)

Contestant	Age	Height	Hometown	Finish	Place
Mariem Sene	20	1.78 m (5 ft 10 in)	Helsinki	Episode 1	12
Armi Häikiö	20	1.73 m (5 ft 8 in)	Espoo	Episode 2	11
Manon Mariaud	18	1.74 m (5 ft 8 1/2 in)	Joutseno	Episode 3	10
Daniela Sorvo	22	1.70 m (5 ft 7 in)	Espoo	Episode 4	9
Tatjana Piper	21	1.70 m (5 ft 7 in)	Helsinki	Episode 5	8
Marje Lanz	18	1.75 m (5 ft 9 in)	Raisio	Episode 6	7
Mari Kohonen	19	1.78 m (5 ft 10 in)	Lappeenranta	Episode 7	6–5
Ana Bekteshi	18	1.75 m (5 ft 9 in)	Vaasa	Episode 7	6–5
Anu Jussila	18	1.80 m (5 ft 11 in)	Ähtäri	Episode 8	4
Maria Rytkönen	18	1.78 m (5 ft 10 in)	Lahti	Episode 9	3
Darina Shved	20	1.75 m (5 ft 9 in)	Helsinki	Episode 10	2
Ani Alitalo	18	1.81 m (5 ft 11 1/2 in)	Helsinki	Episode 10	1

== Summaries ==
=== Call-out order ===
Order	Episodes									
Order	1	2	3	4	5	6	7	8	9	10
1	Tatjana	Mari	Daniela	Darina	Anu	Darina	Darina	Maria	Darina	Ani
2	Darina	Ani	Ani	Ana	Mari	Anu	Anu	Ani	Ani	Darina
3	Ana	Maria	Darina	Maria	Ani	Maria	Maria	Darina	Maria	
4	Maria	Marje	Ana	Anu	Ana	Ani	Ani	Anu		
5	Manon	Anu	Tatjana	Ani	Darina	Ana	Ana; Mari			
6	Ani	Ana	Marje	Mari	Maria	Mari	Ana; Mari			
7	Mari	Manon	Maria	Marje	Marje	Marje				
8	Marje	Tatjana	Anu	Tatjana	Tatjana					
9	Anu	Daniela	Mari	Daniela						
10	Armi	Darina	Manon							
11	Daniela	Armi								
12	Mariem									

The contestant was eliminated
The contestant won the competition

=== Photo shoot guide ===
- Episode 1 photo shoot: Promo photos
- Episode 2 photo shoot: Helsinki opera house dolls
- Episode 3 photo shoot: Hobby Hall catalogue and expressive photos
- Episode 4 photo shoot: Cosmopolitan editorial fashion
- Episode 5 photo shoots: Emotion beauty shots; Bonaqua campaign
- Episode 6 commercial: Magnum ice cream
- Episode 7 photo shoot: Lapland witches
- Episode 8 photo shoot: B&W film noir
- Episode 9 photo shoots: Beach & body control; Greek goddesses; swimsuit photos
- Episode 10 photo shoots: Poolside photos; Max Factor
