= Suomen huippumalli haussa season 3 =

Suomen huippumalli haussa
- Season 3
- Presented by: Anne Kukkohovi
- Judges: Anne Kukkohovi; Saimi Hoyer; Sakari Majantie

Release
- Original network: Nelonen
- Original release: 12 April 2010 – June 14, 2010

Season chronology
- ← Previous; Season 2 Next → Season 4

Cycle three of Suomen huippumalli haussa aired from April to June 2010 on the Finnish channel Nelonen.

The winner of the competition was 19-year-old Jenna Kuokkanen from Porvoo. Her prizes were a contract with Paparazzi Model Management, a 6-page editorial spread in Finnish Elle and a special casting trip to New York City and a position as the new spokesperson for Max Factor. 3 contestants Stephanie Cook, Anna Nevala & Saara Sihvonen all have gone to have successful careers after the season aired.

== Episode summaries ==
=== Premiere ===
Original airdate: 12 April 2010

Saimi Hoyer holds open castings at Stockmanns in Oulu, Lappeenranta, Turku and Tampere. 50 women are chosen to come to Helsinki where they meet with stylist Tommy Kilponen and make-up artist Karoliina Kangas. After a clothing and make-up change and Polaroids, the judges choose 20 contestants for the next round of casting. The girls individually meet with the judges then get a 10-frame photo shoot with Sakari Majantie. After deliberation, Anne Kukkohovi announces the finalists.

=== Let the Games Begin (Kilpailu käynnistyy) ===
Original airdate: 19 April 2010

The girls move into the model house then meet Saimi Hoyer at Kamppi for a catwalk lesson. Tommi Kilponen gives the girls their challenge and Nina wins with a prize of 40 extra frames for the photo shoot and gets to keep her outfit from Vero Moda. The girls are suspended in the air for the photo shoot to show freshness and lightness in their faces for an advert for Subway. At panel, Jenna gets best photo of the week. Anette and Saara land in the bottom two for worse photos. In the end, Anette is sent home because the judges felt she was just a pretty girl.

- First call-out: Jenna Kuokkanen
- Bottom two: Anette Häikiö & Saara Sihvonen
- Eliminated: Anette Häikiö

=== The Mirror Shows your Good and Bad sides (Peili paljastaa hyvät ja huonot puolet) ===
Original airdate: 26 April 2010

Anne Kukkohovi visits the girls and discuss what they like and don’t like about themselves. Next Trainer4You reps Janne Mustonen and Tuomo Kilpeläinen pay a visit to do a body analysis and have a workout. The next day are makeovers with a French hair stylist Franck Provost for the Irresistible Summer 2010 collection. The weekly challenge is to see who is the most professional during the makeover. Tiia wins a gift basket and a pair of Christian Louboutin high heels. For the week's photo, the models must concentrate on themselves in the mirror.

At panel, Stephanie is eliminated for her lack of versatility.

- First call-out: Tiia Hakala
- Bottom two: Nelli & Stephanie Cook
- Eliminated: Stephanie Cook

=== Girls in a Store Window (Tytöt näyteikkunassa) ===
Original airdate: 4 May 2010

The girls get an improv lesson from Jaana Saarinen. For the challenge, the girls are split into three groups and pose in a Sokos window promoting Max Factor mascara. Team two wins, getting 10 extra frames for the photo shoot. The week's photo shoot is for Franck and Fabien Provost hairstyles where the girls must demonstrate teamwork while holding on to their individualities. At the judging panel, Jenna and Krista land in the bottom two, but in the end it is Krista who is sent home.

- First call-out: Tiia Hakala
- Bottom two: Jenna Kuokkanen & Krista Naumanen
- Eliminated: Krista Naumanen

=== Episode 5 ===
Original airdate: 10 May 2010

The girls do an underwater shoot for Classic ice cream. No one is eliminated and all the remaining girls are flown to Milan.

- First call-out: Anna Nevala
- Bottom three: Ira, Jenna Kuokkanen & Nina Puotiniemi
- Eliminated: None

=== Episode 6 ===
Original airdate: 17 May 2010

The girls go to Milan for go-sees and Jenna gets a new haircut. Mari and Nelli get the best feedback at the castings and get to go on a private jet to Stockholm. The week's photo shoot is for Hästens beds.

Nina and Saara are the bottom two, both for the second time. Nina leaves the competition.

- First call-out: Nelli
- Bottom two: Nina Puotiniemi & Saara Sihvonen
- Eliminated: Nina Puotiniemi

=== Episode 7 ===
Original airdate: 24 May 2010

Mari and Nelli go to a manor in Stockholm and the next day meet a special guest Miss J. Alexander. After returning from Sweden, all the girls meet with Miss J. for a runway lesson. Next the girls go to a Marimekko fashion show and cocktail party where the girls are being watched to find out who has the best social skills. In addition to the gift bags that all the girls get, the winner, Saara, receives a large Marimekko gift box. The photo shoot is an editorial for Elle with handbags as an accessory. Tiia was the best model of the week. Both Nelli and Anna are eliminated.

- First call-out: Tiia Hakala
- Bottom two/eliminated: Anna Nevala & Nelli
- Special guest: J. Alexander

=== Episode 8 ===
Original airdate: 31 May 2010

The girls fly to Egypt. They are given 100 Egyptian pounds, an adjective and 30 minutes to buy clothes at the bazaar to fit their adjective. Next the girls go to the beach and meet Saimi. The challenge of the week is to balance pitchers of red wine on their heads while walking on the sand in high heels. Saara wins the challenge. The photo shoot is tourist photos for the Tjäreborg travel company. Ira is criticised for not having model body requirements and Mari for having a negative attitude with the client. Ira is sent home.

- First call-out: Jenna Kuokkanen
- Bottom two: Ira & Mari
- Eliminated: Ira

=== Episode 9 ===
Original airdate: 7 June 2010

The girls go snorkeling after which Sakari meets them at Luxor Temple. The challenge is for the contestants to take photographs and present the best five. The idea is to know what it is like on the other side of the camera as a photographer. The photo shoot is for Fazer Geisha. The girls, dressed as geishas, must emulate softness as both the original Geisha chocolate bar and the new flavour Dreamy Caramel. Tiia is the best model of the week, and Mari is eliminated.

- First call-out: Tiia Hakala
- Bottom two: Mari & Saara Sihvonen
- Eliminated: Mari

=== Episode 10 ===
Original airdate: 14 June 2010

The season finale. The girls' final photo shoot is a beauty shoot for Max Factor. For the final judging, there is a runway challenge between the three finalists for Vero Moda in front of an audience of family and friends.

Jenna is declared the third winner of Finland's Next Top Model.

- Final three: Jenna Kuokkanen, Saara Sihvonen & Tiia Hakala
- Finland's Next Top Model: Jenna Kuokkanen

== Contestants ==
(ages stated are at start of contest)

Contestant	Age	Height	Hometown	Finish	Place
Anette Häikiö	18	175.5 cm (5 ft 9 in)	Jyväskylä	Episode 2	11
Stephanie Cook	18	175 cm (5 ft 9 in)	Askola	Episode 3	10
Krista Naumanen	18	175 cm (5 ft 9 in)	Kuopio	Episode 4	9
Nina Puotiniemi	19	179 cm (5 ft 10 1/2 in)	Oulu	Episode 6	8
Nelli Sorvo	19	186.5 cm (6 ft 1 1/2 in)	Helsinki	Episode 7	7–6
Anna Nevala	19	174 cm (5 ft 8 1/2 in)	Helsinki	Episode 7	7–6
Ira Kaitazis	19	181 cm (5 ft 11 1/2 in)	Turku	Episode 8	5
Mari Torni	18	182 cm (5 ft 11 1/2 in)	Helsinki	Episode 9	4
Tiia Hakala	18	183 cm (6 ft 0 in)	Tampere	Episode 10	3–2
Saara Sihvonen	18	179.5 cm (5 ft 10 1/2 in)	Helsinki	Episode 10	3–2
Jenna Kuokkanen	19	173.5 cm (5 ft 8 1/2 in)	Porvoo	Episode 10	1

== Summaries ==
=== Call-out order ===
Anne's call-out order
Order	Episodes									
Order	1	2	3	4	5	6	7	8	9	10
1	Mari	Jenna	Tiia	Tiia	Anna	Nelli	Tiia	Jenna	Tiia	Jenna
2	Nelli	Nelli	Saara	Ira	Mari	Ira	Jenna	Saara	Jenna	Saara; Tiia
3	Anette	Tiia	Mari	Nelli	Tiia	Anna	Ira	Tiia	Saara	Saara; Tiia
4	Stephanie	Ira	Nina	Nina	Nelli	Jenna	Mari	Mari	Mari	
5	Anna	Krista	Anna	Saara	Saara	Mari	Saara	Ira		
6	Ira	Anna	Ira	Anna	Ira	Tiia	Anna; Nelli			
7	Saara	Nina	Jenna	Mari	Jenna; Nina	Saara	Anna; Nelli			
8	Tiia	Stephanie	Krista	Jenna	Jenna; Nina	Nina				
9	Jenna	Mari	Nelli	Krista						
10	Krista	Saara	Stephanie							
11	Nina	Anette								

The contestant was eliminated
The contestant was part of a non-elimination bottom three
The contestant won the competition

- In episode 1, the finalists were selected. After the announcement of the top 10, Nina was added to the cast as the eleventh finalist.
- In episode 1, Ira's call-out was not shown due to a possible editing mistake.
- In episode 2, Anna's call-out was not shown due to a possible editing mistake.
- In episode 5, no one was eliminated.

=== Photo shoot guide ===
- Episode 1 photo shoot: Beauty shots (casting)
- Episode 2 photo shoot: Light and airy flying
- Episode 3 photo shoot: Konehelsinki ads
- Episode 4 photo shoot: Franck & Fabien Provost hair
- Episode 5 photo shoot: Classic ice cream pool
- Episode 6 photo shoot: Hästens bed commercials
- Episode 7 photo shoot: Editorial shoot for Elle
- Episode 8 photo shoot: Tourists for Tjäreborg
- Episode 9 photo shoot: Fazer geisha
- Episode 10 photo shoot: Max Factor ads
