= Suomen huippumalli haussa season 7 =

TV show season

Suomen huippumalli haussa
- Season 7

Release
- Original network: MTV Katsomo; MTV3
- Original release: September 15 – November 17, 2022

Season chronology
- ← Previous; Season 6

Suomen huippumalli haussa, Cycle 7 is the seventh season of the Suomen huippumalli haussa series that began to air on 12 September 2022 on streaming service MTV Katsomo, and air on 15 September 2022 on channel MTV3. The judging panel was revamped with Veronica Verho as the host, Saara Sihvonen as the main judge, and Jasmin Mishima, Juha Mustonen and Viivi Huuska as co-judges. Once again, male hopefuls were allowed to apply introducing a co-ed cycle.

The winner of the competition was 25-year-old Jarrah Kollei, from Espoo. As her prizes, she will be star in Zalando's campaign and feature on Vogue Scandinavia website.

== Contestants ==
(Ages stated are at start of contest)

Contestant	Age	Height	Hometown	Finish	Place
Ayse Ozkan	17	1.79 m (5 ft 10 1/2 in)	Vantaa	Episode 1	14
Hanna Marquez	21	1.68 m (5 ft 6 in)	Vantaa	Episode 2	13
Eeva Takamäki	19	1.73 m (5 ft 8 in)	Lahti	Episode 3	12-11
Jere Syrjäniemi	23	1.94 m (6 ft 4 1/2 in)	Tampere	Episode 3	12-11
Linda Kemppainen	26	1.75 m (5 ft 9 in)	Jyväskylä	Episode 4	10
Marié Kärkkäinen	19	1.74 m (5 ft 8 1/2 in)	Sipoo	Episode 6	9-8
Minttu Korvela	22	1.70 m (5 ft 7 in)	Helsinki	Episode 6	9-8
Venla Stirkkinen	27	1.74 m (5 ft 8 1/2 in)	Turku	Episode 7	7
Abas Ishetu	23	1.78 m (5 ft 10 in)	Helsinki	Episode 8	6
Eino Svartberg	23	1.86 m (6 ft 1 in)	Turku	Episode 9	5-4
Rosa Majava	17	1.83 m (6 ft 0 in)	Tampere	Episode 9	5-4
Leevi Suomela	26	1.82 m (5 ft 11 1/2 in)	Helsinki	Episode 10	3-2
Sirkka Konttila	20	1.75 m (5 ft 9 in)	Oulu	Episode 10	3-2
Jarrah Kollei	25	1.84 m (6 ft 1/2 in)	Espoo	Episode 10	1

== Episodes ==
=== Episode 1 ===
Original airdate: 15 September 2022

14 new models have their first challenge to self tape a video that shows their personality. After watching all the self tapes, Saara and Veronica meet the models and announced that they will compete in groups throughout the competition and each week, the group that performs better is safe and one model from the losing team is eliminated. And team captains for the first photoshoot, for winning the self tape challenge, are Rosa and Leevi and they are also get to pick the teams. The teams are:

Team leader	Models
Rosa	Jarrah, Eino, Eeva, Jere, Marié, Linda
Leevi	Ayse, Venla, Minttu, Abas, Sirkka, Hanna

The next day, they have their first photoshoot shooting indoor as a group and later posing on top of the rooftop as individuals. At the judging room, beside Saara are judge Viivi Huuska and the guest judge, photographer Tuukka Koski. But before judging happen, the models have a runway challenge. Later, the judges review the 2 group shoots and call the team leaders to announce the winning team and team Rosa win, which mean all members from team Rosa are safe. After individual deliberation from each teams, Saara instantly announced that Ayse is eliminated, and the judges decided that Eino & Eeva got best photo, and they'll be the team leader for next week.

- Challenge winner: Team Rosa
- Immune: Team Rosa
- Best photo: Eeva Takamäki & Eino Svartberg
- Eliminated: Ayse Ozkan
- Featured photographer: Tuukka Koski

=== Episode 2 ===
Original airdate: 22 September 2022

Fashion blogger Alexa Dagmar comes to hold their Zalando Closet challenge. The challenge is that two members of each team will be styled "Nordic", one member of the team is the one to pick the clothes and the rest will do the styling, and all this needs to happen in 30 minutes. Team Eeva win the challenge and will get a free dinner.

Team leader	Models
Eeva	Hanna, Venla, Rosa, Abas, Leevi
Eino	Jarrah, Linda, Sirkka, Jere, Minttu, Marié

The next day, they have their next photoshoot of Alter-ego theme. At the judging room, beside Saara are judge Viivi Huuska and the guest judge, shoe designer Minna Parikka. But before judging happen, the models have a runway challenge. Later, the judges review the 2 group shoots and call the team leaders to announce the winning team and team Eino win, which mean all members from team Eino are safe. After individual deliberation from each teams, Saara instantly announced that Hanna is eliminated, and the judges decided that Jarrah & Venla got best photo, and they'll be the team leader for next week.

- Challenge winner: Team Eeva
- Immune: Team Eino
- Best photo: Jarrah Kollei & Venla Stirkkinen
- Eliminated: Hanna Jaskara Marquez
- Featured photographer: Nana Simelius
- Guest judges: Minna Parikka

=== Episode 3 ===
Original airdate: 29 September 2022

The remaining 12 contestants received makeover. The next day, they have their next photoshoot for Niki Newd natural makeup company. The main focus is on their hands and they'll be posing in water that's freezing cold. But before that, Saara announced to them that his time there will be no group photos as one person from both teams will be eliminated.

Team leader	Models
Jarrah	Eeva, Minttu, Abas, Rosa, Jere
Venla	Leevi, Linda, Marié, Eino, Sirkka

At the judging room, beside Saara are judge Viivi Huuska and the guest judge, Niki Newd founder Kirsi Kaukonen. But before judging happen, the models have a runway challenge. After individual deliberation from each teams, The judges are impressed with all the photos from team Venla and decided that all members from team Venla are safe. At the end, Saara instantly announced that Jere & Eeva are eliminated, and the judges decided that Leevi & Linda got best photo, and they'll be the team leader for next week. But the episode end in cliffhanger, as Saara asked them to pick their teammates immediately.

- Best photo: Leevi Suomela & Linda Kemppainen
- Eliminated: Eeva Takamäki & Jere Syrjäniemi
- Featured photographer: Marko Rantanen
- Guest judges: Kirsi Kaukonen

=== Episode 4 ===
Original airdate: 6 October 2022

The remaining models have a make-up challenge, which they get to create makeup for themselves to showcase who they are but they also need to be creative with the products. Team Linda did the best, but it was Abas is the winner of this hallenge and will have a meeting with Maybelline client. The next day, they have a video shoot for Red Nose Day Fundraiser, where the models are supposed to sell non-existent Red Nose Fragrance in comedy adverts. The teams will do the same video script individually and in groups. The director Juho Konstig was telling the models shouldn't be afraid to let loose in the shoot.

Team leader	Models
Leevi	Jarrah, Rosa, Marié, Sirkka
Linda	Venla, Abas, Eino, Minttu

At the judging room, beside Saara are judge Jasmin Mishima and the guest judge, director Juho Konstig. But before judging happen, the models have a runway challenge in QHair wigs. Later, the judges review the 2 group shoots and call the team leaders to announce the winning team and team Leevi win, which mean all members from team Leevi are safe. After individual deliberation from each teams, Saara instantly announced that Linda is eliminated, and the judges decided that Marié & Jarrah got best performance, and they'll receive a gift cards from QHair, as well as become the team leader for next week.

- Challenge winner: Abas Ishetu
- Immune: Team Leevi
- Best photo: Jarrah Kollei & Marié Kärkkäinen
- Eliminated: Linda Kemppainen
- Director: Juho Konstig

=== Episode 5 ===
Original airdate: 13 October 2022

Choreographer Venla Vuorio came to teach runway walk to the models. Her own coach for runway was Benny Ninja from America's Next Top Model, which means her background is from ballroom. She tells she's going to teach the groups choreography that they will then perform at the judging. Vuorio also tells the runway will determine this week's winning team and both teams need a name for themselves. The next day, they have their next photoshoot for Helsinki Citycopter service, where the main thing was luxury and dynamic looks.

Team leader	Models
Jarrah	Eino, Rosa, Abas
Marié	Minttu, Venla, Leevi, Sirkka

At the judging room, beside Saara are judge Jasmin Mishima and the guest judge, choreographer Venla Vuorio. But before judging happen, the models have a runway challenge in ballroom theme. Later, the judges review the 2 group shoots and call the team leaders to announce the winning team and team Jarrah win, which mean all members from team Jarrah are safe. After individual deliberation from each teams, Saara called Marié & Venla up for elimination, but later announced that they are both save. At the end, the judges decided that Jarrah & Sirkka got best performance, and Helsinki Citycopter will bring them to watch the sunset on the helicopter, as well as become the team leader for next week.

- Immune: Team Jarrah
- Best photo: Jarrah Kollei & Sirkka Konttila
- Bottom 2: Marié Kärkkäinen & Venla Stirkkinen
- Eliminated: None
- Featured photographer: Jonas Lundqvist
- Guest judges: Venla Vuorio

=== Episode 6 ===
Original airdate: 20 October 2022

Veronica arrives to the model house telling the 9 remaining models about their future might include doing hosting and interviews themselves. Therefore, the models will be sent out to the streets to interview people of the street about their street style. They will do the tasks in groups over 20 mins. Veronica will be judging their social skills, contact with people and how they behave in group. Team Sirkka win the challenge and will be meeting with a lifestyle blogger to talk about brand building.

Team leader	Models
Jarrah	Eino, Rosa, Abas
Sirkka	Marié, Leevi, Minttu, Venla

The next day, they have their next photoshoot for Zalando. Unique style and personality, joy, bravery and unapologetic attitude were the main points for the shoot, which the photos will be use on their website. After the photoshoot finished, Saara announced that from now on, they will compete as individuals. At the judging room, beside Saara are judge Jasmin Mishima and the guest judge, photographer Janita Autio. But before judging happen, the models have a runway challenge. After individual deliberation, Saara and the judges decided that Rosa got best performance, and Marié & Minttu are eliminated.

- Challenge winner: Team Sirkka
- Best photo: Rosa Majava
- Eliminated: Marié Kärkkäinen & Minttu Korvela
- Featured photographer: Janita Autio

=== Episode 7 ===
Original airdate: 27 October 2022

The 7 remaining models have their next photoshoot for Relove Second Hand Store, and the theme for the social media campaign is you are what you wear, which means the models need to bring their own stories into the photos in form of their values.

At the judging room, beside Saara are judge Juha Mustonen and the guest judge, former Miss Finland and Relove Second Hand Store founder Noora Hautakangas. But before judging happen, the models have a runway challenge in ethereal theme. After individual deliberation, Saara and the judges decided that Abas got best performance, and Venla is eliminated.

- Best photo: Abas Ishetu
- Eliminated: Venla Stirkkinen
- Featured photographer: Jan Lönnberg
- Guest judges: Noora Hautakangas

=== Episode 8 ===
Original airdate: 3 November 2022

The remaining models receive the scroll of script in front of the model house which contains manuscript for acting challenge called "Model Noir", talk about a suspect who has been destroying the modelling world for the past five years. Later, they arrive in a studio to meet Saara alongside actress Minna Haapkylä, whom will be their acting partner for the challenge. Saara tells them that the challenge winner will win an individual immunity. The models are expected to bring out different emotions in the scene, and they're allowed to improv the lines as there's just outline to the story of what happens.

The next day, they have their next photoshoot for the cover of hairstyle magazine Pinni and they must carry the style and details in the shoot. At the judging room, beside Saara are judge Juha Mustonen and the guest judge, Qhair's artistic director Sedin Klapuh. But before judging happen, the models have a runway challenge. After individual deliberation, Saara announced the winner of the acting challenge and will be immuned from this elimination is Leevi. But surprise doesn't end here, the judges also decided that Leevi got best performance and his photo will be on the cover of Pinni magazine's new issue. At the end, Saara announced that Abas is eliminated.

- Challenge winner/Immune: Leevi Suomela
- Best photo: Leevi Suomela
- Eliminated: Abas Ishetu
- Featured photographer: Sanna Lehto
- Guest judges: Sedin Klapuh

=== Episode 9 ===
Original airdate: 10 November 2022

The remaining models receive a box fill with questions about modelling and their own views. Later, they meet Saara and have a therapy session, as Saara is also a mental wellbeing coach for models, actors and entrepreneurs on the side of her modelling career, and Saara later decided to grant them each 5 week private coaching sessions after the show.

The next day, they have their next photoshoot for four clients who all work within future of textiles, and they were looking for effortless looks. At the judging room, beside Saara are judge Juha Mustonen and the guest judge, model Saimi Hoyer. But before judging happen, the models have a runway challenge in Magpie Chicks theme. After individual deliberation, Saara announced that Leevi, Sirkka and Jarrah have made it to the final, while Eino and Rosa are eliminated. Right after they left, Saara surprised the top 3 finalists that they will all heading to Berlin.

- Eliminated: Eino Svartberg & Rosa Majava
- Featured photographer: Kanerva Mantila
- Guest judges: Saimi Hoyer

=== Episode 10 ===
Original airdate: 17 November 2022

The three finalists head out to Berlin. Once they arrived, they have a go-see with Claudia Lorenz from M4 Models Management, with whom one of them might get a contract with. Later, they have their final photoshoot for Klaus Haapaniemi, which the expectations for the shoot is a lot of improvisation as it's some experimental dance studio for whom they are the performers.

The next day, the final 3 return to Helsinki and they are taken to their last runway and judging by a limousine. They got to meet all the eliminated models. At the judging room, beside Saara are judges Juha Mustonen and Viivi Huuska. But before judging happen, Veronica give them a final advice to showcase their talent on the runway and wow the judges as it's their last moment. The eliminated models got to walk in the outfit they wearing right now, while the top three will walk in Ervin Latimer's design. In the end, Jarrah was crowned as the seventh winner of the competition.

- Final three: Jarrah Kollei, Leevi Suomela & Sirkka Konttila
- Finland's Next Top Model: Jarrah Kollei
- Featured photographer: Stefan Gräf

== Summaries ==
Place	Model	Episodes									
Place	Model	1	2	3	4	5	6	7	8	9	10
1	Jarrah	IMM	HIGH	SAFE	HIGH	HIGH	SAFE	SAFE	SAFE	LOW	WINNER
2-3	Leevi	SAFE	SAFE	HIGH	IMM	SAFE	SAFE	SAFE	HIGH	HIGH	OUT
2-3	Sirkka	SAFE	IMM	SAFE	IMM	HIGH	SAFE	SAFE	SAFE	SAFE	OUT
4-5	Eino	HIGH	IMM	SAFE	SAFE	IMM	SAFE	SAFE	SAFE	OUT	
4-5	Rosa	IMM	SAFE	SAFE	IMM	IMM	HIGH	SAFE	SAFE	OUT	
6	Abas	SAFE	SAFE	SAFE	SAFE	IMM	SAFE	HIGH	OUT		
7	Venla	SAFE	HIGH	SAFE	SAFE	LOW	SAFE	OUT			
8-9	Minttu	SAFE	IMM	SAFE	SAFE	SAFE	OUT				
8-9	Marié	IMM	IMM	SAFE	HIGH	LOW	OUT				
10	Linda	IMM	IMM	HIGH	OUT						
11-12	Eeva	HIGH	SAFE	OUT							
11-12	Jere	IMM	IMM	OUT							
13	Hanna	SAFE	OUT								
14	Ayse	OUT									

The contestant was eliminated
The contestant was immune from elimination
The contestant was in danger of elimination
The contestant won best photo
The contestant won the competition

=== Photo shoot guide ===
- Episode 1 photo shoot: Posing in the heights
- Episode 2 photo shoot: Alter-ego
- Episode 3 photo shoot: Into the cold water for Niki Newd
- Episode 4 video shoot: Comedic theme for Red Nose Day Fundraiser
- Episode 5 photo shoot: Luxury and dynamic for Helsinki Citycopter
- Episode 6 photo shoot: Zalando Campaign
- Episode 7 photo shoot: Visible values for Relove Töölöntori
- Episode 8 photo shoot: Pinni magazine covers
- Episode 9 photo shoot: Surreal-Futuristic Euphoria with Domestic Textile
- Episode 10 photo shoot: Klaus Haapaniemi artwork

== Judges ==
- Veronica Verho (host)
- Saara Sihvonen
- Jasmin Mishima
- Juha Mustonen
- Viivi Huuska
