= Suomen huippumalli haussa =

- Genre: Reality
- Created by: Tyra Banks
- Presented by: Anne Kukkohovi (2008–2012); Maryam Razavi (2017); Veronica Verho (2022)
- Judges: Current; Veronica Verho; Saara Sihvonen; Former; Maryam Razavi; Juri Silvennoinen; Marica Rosengård; Anne Kukkohovi; Saimi Hoyer; Sakari Majantie; Teri Niiti
- Country of origin: Finland

Production
- Production locations: Helsinki, Finland
- Running time: 60 minutes (including commercials)
- Production company: FremantleMedia Finland

Original release
- Network: Nelonen (2008-2017); MTV3 (2022)
- Release: 6 April 2008

Suomen huippumalli haussa (English: Search for Finland's top model) is a Finnish reality show based on America's Next Top Model. The series premiered on 6 April 2008, on the Finnish channel Nelonen. The show is produced by FremantleMedia.

The winner of cycle one, Ani Alitalo, was awarded a €25,000 contract with Paparazzi Model Management, the front cover of Finnish Cosmopolitan and became a spokesperson for Max Factor. The winners of cycles two (Nanna Grundfeldt) and three (Jenna Kuokkanen) also won the same awards, however, there was no announced cash prize for the modeling contract, and there were two additional casting trips to Milan for Grundfeldt, and a trip to New York for Kuokkanen as part of the prize.

== Show format ==
As on the American version of the show, each episode at least one reward challenge and at least one photo shoot take place, with one contestant eliminated at the end. The elimination process follows the same format as on the American version. This includes a call-out order based on each contestant's performance, and the two worst-performing contestants in danger of elimination (bottom two). In some cases, double eliminations and non-eliminations have taken place by consensus of the judging panel. Also, as on the American version the contestants receive sporadic "Anne mail" (Annepostia or posti Annelta) with hints for upcoming challenges. Each episode a guest judge sits on the panel.

== Differences from the original series ==
Unlike on the American version, which generally has 13 or 14 contestants, the Finnish series begins with only 11 or 12 models.

There are fewer reward challenges, or challenges with winners but no reward. In the early cycles there were more photo shoots than on the American version, usually two per episode.

The finalists do not participate in a fashion show at the end of the competition. The final decision is based solely on the contestants’ photo portfolio and overall performance during the competition.

Since cycle 6, male participants were allowed to apply introducing a co-ed edition.

== Judges ==
Judges	Seasons						
Judges	1 (2008)	2 (2009)	3 (2010)	4 (2011)	5 (2012)	6 (2017)	7 (2022)
Hosts
Anne Kukkohovi	Host	Host	Host	Host	Host		
Maryam Razavi						Host	
Veronica Verho							Host
Judging Panelists
Saimi Hoyer	Main	Main	Main	Main	Main		Guest
Sakari Majantie	Main	Main	Main	Main	Main		
Marica Rosengård						Main	
Juri Silvennoinen						Main	
Saara Sihvonen			Contestant				Main
Jasmin Mishima							Main
Juha Mustonen							Main
Viivi Huuska							Main

== Cycles ==
Cycle	Premiere date	Winner	Runner-up	Other contestants in order of elimination	Number of contestants	International Destinations
1	6 April 2008	Ani Alitalo	Darina Shved	Mariem Sene, Armi Häikiö, Manon Mariaud, Daniela Sorvo, Tatjana Piper, Marje Lanz, Mari Kohonen & Ana Bekteshi, Anu Jussila, Maria Rytkönen	12	Stockholm; Side
2	13 April 2009	Nanna Grundfeldt	Anna-Kaisa Tyrväinen & Riina Roms	Essi Hellstén, Inka Tuominen, Ida Piipari, Anastassia Grishina, Blanche Malaka, Laura Merkel, Suvi Jokipii & Janina Stjernvall	11	Paris; Las Palmas
3	12 April 2010	Jenna Kuokkanen	Saara Sihvonen & Tiia Hakala	Anette Häikiö, Stephanie Cook, Krista Naumanen, Nina Puotiniemi, Nelli Sorvo & Anna Nevala, Ira Kaitazis, Mari Torni	11	Milan; Stockholm; Cairo; Luxor
4	12 September 2011	Anna-Sofia Ali-Sisto	Helen Preis	Hilda Nissinen, Roosa Puonti, Sahra Ali Mohamud & Janni Puuppo, Veronica Kontio, Mari Viitanen, Nelli Junttila, Elsi Pulkkinen, Eevi Nieminen, Minna Puro	12	London; Lisbon
5	3 September 2012	Meri Ikonen	Matleena Helander & Polina Hiekkala	Nelli-Kaneli Wasenius (quit), Nevena Ek, Malla Hyytiäinen, Katja Soisalo, Vilma Karjalainen, Sanna Takalampi, Viivi Luopa, Annika Åkerfeldt	11	Reykjavík; Machakos
6	15 March 2017	Jerry Koivisto	Sofia Öster	Emilia Hölttä, Ville Mäkäräinen, Jesse Halt & Emilia Ylenius, Anniina Sankoh, Henrik Lyly, Roosa Marttila & Robert Tollet, Vilja Tuohisto-Kokko & Juuso Salpakari	12	Tallinn
7	15 September 2022	Jarrah Kollei	Leevi Suomela & Sirkka Konttila	Ayse Ozkan, Hanna Jaskara Marquez, Jere Syrjäniemi & Eeva Takamäki, Linda Kemppainen, Minttu Korvela & Marié Kärkkäinen, Venla Stirkkinen, Abas Ishetu, Rosa Majava & Eino Svartberg	14	Berlin

== See also ==
- Mallikoulu (Model School), another Finnish modelling competition, which aired in 2005, 2006 and 2015.
