= Top Model (Swedish TV series) season 1 =

Top Model
- Season 1
- No. of episodes: 12

Release
- Original release: September 12 – December 12, 2007

Top Model (or Top Model Stockholm; abbreviated as Top Model Sthlm) was the first individual season of the Swedish adaptation of Top Model, based in Stockholm. It was hosted by Vendela Kirsebom, who was hosting Norway's Next Top Model at the same time. The prize also included a worldwide campaign for Make Up Store and a contract with LA Models & New York Model Management

The winner of the competition was 18-year-old Hawa Ahmed. The runner-up, 19-year-old Margarita Maiseyenka, was deported from Sweden back to Belarus after the show aired, where she stayed for six months.

== Contestants ==
(ages stated at start of contest)

Name	Age	Height	Outcome	Place
Albulena Grajqevci	19	1.74 m (5 ft 8 1/2 in)	Episode 2	12
Linda Lindén	21	1.72 m (5 ft 7 1/2 in)	Episode 3	11
Hanna Markendahl	18	1.78 m (5 ft 10 in)	Episode 4	10
Pauline Naisubi	22	1.78 m (5 ft 10 in)	Episode 5	9
Daniella Pedersen	20	1.75 m (5 ft 9 in)	Episode 6	8-7
Nadia Borra	21	1.76 m (5 ft 9 1/2 in)	Episode 6	8-7
Malin Karlén	18	1.73 m (5 ft 8 in)	Episode 7	6
Jenny Andersson	16	1.77 m (5 ft 9 1/2 in)	Episode 8	5
Pia Cossa Åkesson	18	1.74 m (5 ft 8 1/2 in)	Episode 10	4
Sanna Lindfors	16	1.78 m (5 ft 10 in)	Episode 11	3
Margarita Maiseyenka	19	1.70 m (5 ft 7 in)	Episode 12	2
Hawa Ahmed	18	1.75 m (5 ft 9 in)	Episode 12	1

== Episodes ==
=== Episode 1:`Crying, Measuring Sticks & Glamor ===
Original Air Date: September 12, 2007

Casting episode.

=== Episode 2: Hard Awakening for the Models ===
Original Air Date: September 19, 2007

- First call-out: Daniella Pedersen
- Bottom two: Albulena Grajqevci & Jenny Andersson
- Eliminated: Albulena Grajqevci
- Featured photographer: Francis Hills

=== Episode 3: Make-over, Crying & Noise ===
Original Air Date: September 26, 2007

- First call-out: Hawa Ahmed
- Bottom two: Linda Lindén & Malin Karlén
- Eliminated: Linda Lindén
- Featured photographer: Carlo Bosco

=== Episode 4: Snygg-Lars greets... ===
Original Air Date: October 3, 2007

- First call-out: Hawa Ahmed
- Bottom two: Hanna Markendahl & Malin Karlén
- Eliminated: Hanna Markendahl
- Featured photographer: Francis Hills

=== Episode 5: Fatigue & Shortness of breath ===
Original Air Date: October 10, 2007

- First call-out: Jenny Andersson
- Bottom two: Nadia Borra & Pauline Naisubi
- Eliminated: Pauline Naisubi
- Featured photographer: Jacob Felländer

=== Episode 6: "Lack of respect!" ===
Original Air Date: October 17, 2007

- First call-out: Margarita Maiseyenka
- Bottom two: Daniella Pedersen & Nadia Borra
- Eliminated: Daniella Pedersen & Nadia Borra
- Featured photographer: Francis Hills

=== Episode 7: Ms. Jay says hello! ===
Original Air Date: October 24, 2007

- First call-out: Margarita Maiseyenka
- Bottom two: Jenny Andersson & Malin Karlén
- Eliminated: Malin Karlén
- Featured photographer: Francis Hills

=== Episode 8: Shameful & Noisy ===
Original Air Date: October 31, 2007

- First call-out: Pia Cossa Åkesson
- Bottom two: Jenny Andersson & Margarita Maiseyenka
- Eliminated: Jenny Andersson
- Featured photographer: Francis Hills

=== Episode 9: Drama on the Globe ===
Original Air Date: November 7, 2007

- Eliminated: None
- Featured photographer: Andreas von Gegerfelt

=== Episode 10 ===
Original Air Date: November 14, 2007

- First call-out: Hawa Ahmed
- Bottom two: Margarita Maiseyenka & Pia Cossa Åkesson
- Eliminated: Pia Cossa Åkesson

=== Episode 11: Frozen Berries & Perfume ===
Original Air Date: December 5, 2007

- First call-out: Margarita Maiseyenka
- Bottom two: Hawa Ahmed & Sanna Lindfors
- Eliminated: Sanna Lindfors
- Featured photographer: Francis Hills

=== Episode 12: The Final ===
Original Air Date: December 12, 2007

- Final two: Hawa Ahmed & Margarita Maiseyenka
- Top Model Sthlm: Hawa Ahmed

== Summaries ==
=== Call-out order ===
Order	Episodes									
Order	2	3	4	5	6	7	8	10	11	12
1	Pauline	Pia	Pia	Margarita	Jenny	Margarita	Hawa	Hawa	Hawa	Hawa
2	Margarita	Hawa	Daniella	Hawa	Pia	Sanna	Pia	Margarita	Margarita	Margarita
3	Sanna	Pauline	Pauline	Jenny	Margarita	Pia	Sanna	Sanna	Sanna	
4	Hawa	Nadia	Malin	Sanna	Hawa	Hawa	Margarita	Pia		
5	Nadia	Jenny	Sanna	Pia	Sanna	Jenny	Jenny			
6	Pia	Hanna	Margarita	Nadia	Malin	Malin				
7	Daniella	Sanna	Hawa	Malin	Daniella					
8	Hanna	Daniella	Jenny	Daniella	Nadia					
9	Jenny	Margarita	Nadia	Pauline						
10	Linda	Malin	Hanna							
11	Malin	Linda								
12	Albulena									

The contestant was eliminated
The contestant won the competition

- In episode 9, no-one was eliminated

=== Photo Shoot Guide ===
- Episode 1 Photoshoot: Pose in blue jeans and white shirt (casting)
- Episode 2 Photoshoot: Superheroes in Stockholm
- Episode 3 Photoshoot: Topless Beauty Shot
- Episode 4 Photoshoot: Posing Topless in Black and White with a Male Model
- Episode 5 Photoshoot: Yoga on the Water
- Episode 6 Photoshoot: Country Couture
- Episode 7 Photoshoot: Celebrity on the Red Carpet
- Episode 8 Photoshoot: Posing with Animals
- Episode 9 Photoshoot: Rooftop Shot atop the Globen
- Episode 10 Photoshoot: Vintage Pin-ups
- Episode 11 Photoshoot: Self-Provided and Directed Perfume Based on Personalities Endorsement
- Episode 12 Photoshoot: Ballroom Dancer
