= Soila Komi =

Finnish actress (1943–2022)

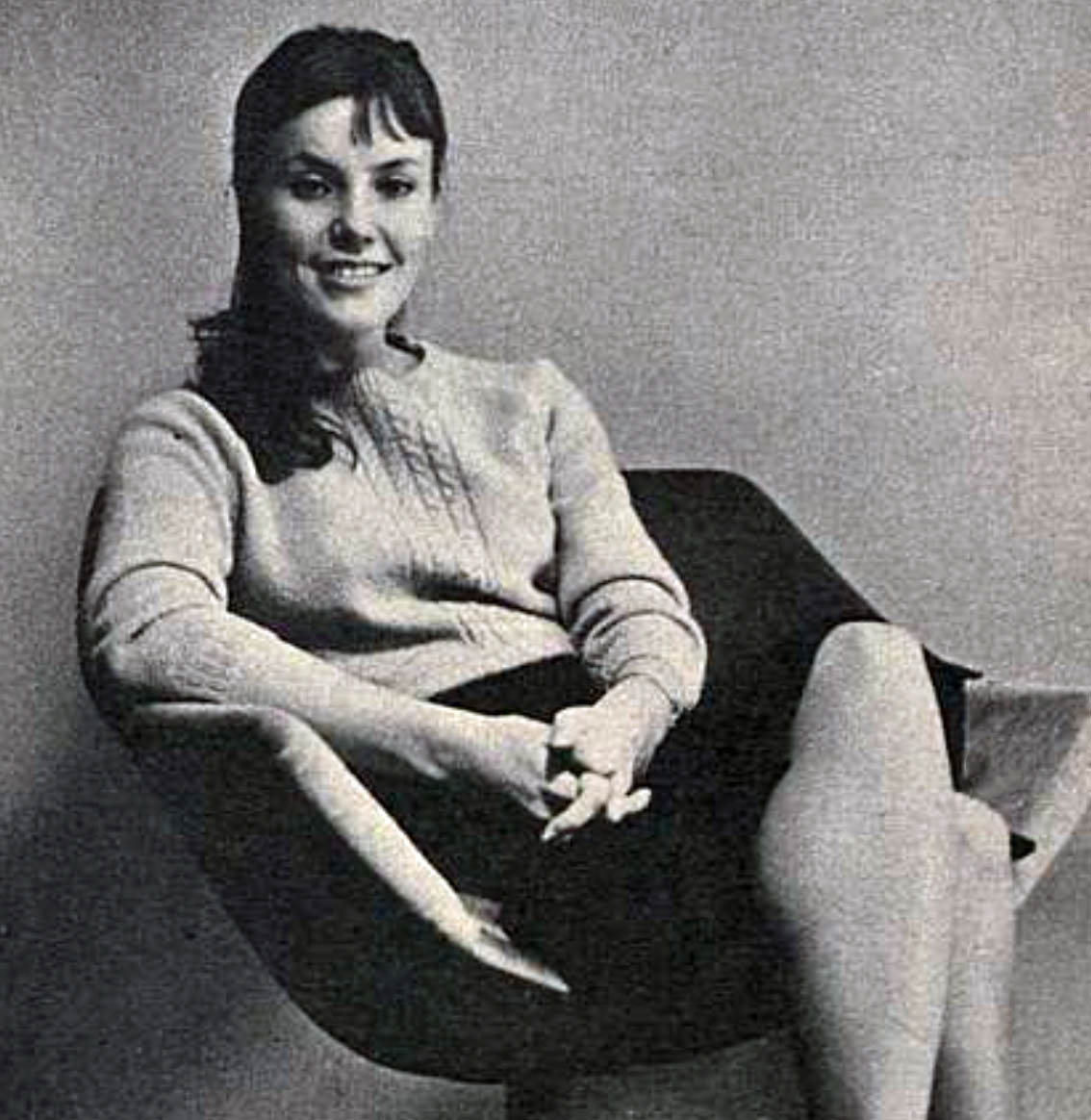
Komi in 1966

Soila Komi (28 April 1943 – 3 July 2022) was a Finnish actress. Komi was a long-time actor at the Finnish National Theatre.

Soila Komi was born in Seinäjoki in 1943 and attended school in Tampere. She graduated from Helsinki Theatre Academy in 1965 and began her career at the National Theatre. In 2011 she was selected an honorary member of the Finnish Actors Union. After retiring, Komi became ill with Lewy body dementia. She died on 3 July 2022 in Punkaharju.

Komi was married to actor Jyrki Nousiainen from 1967 until 2012. They had one daughter, model Saimi Hoyer.
