= Taiwan Supermodel No. 1 =

- Presented by: Bianca Bai; Kevin Tsai
- Country of origin: Taiwan
- Original language: Mandarin
- No. of seasons: 2

Production
- Running time: 60 minutes (including commercial) (season 1); 90 minutes (including commercial) (season 2)

Original release
- Network: TVBS Entertainment Channel
- Release: 28 November 2007 – 13 July 2008

Taiwan Supermodel No. 1 (決戰第一名 Supermodel No. 1), also known as Taiwan's Next Top Model, is based on American reality show America's Next Top Model, which was created by Tyra Banks. Taiwan Super Model No. 1 is the second Top Model franchise that features both genders. The first was Malaysia's I Wanna Be A Model. The show pits contestants against each other in a variety of competitions to determine who will win a modelling contract with Catwalk Production House and other prizes in hopes of a promising career start in the modeling industry.

The first season premiered in January 2008.

== Format ==
Each season of Taiwan Supermodel No. 1 starts with 10 pairs of contestants, male and female. In each episode, two contestants (male and female) are eliminated, although there have been cases in which no contestants were eliminated by consensus of the judging panel.

In each episode, the models are given three tasks. The first task is the catwalk, the second task is a challenge, and the third task is a photo shoot.

== Series summary ==
Season	Premiere date	Winner	Runner(s)-up	Other contestants in order of elimination	Number of contestants
1	November 28, 2007	Tina He	Sean Pai	Kelly Zhang (quit), Chris Chen & Joanne Yao & Tommy Gao, James Zhuang & Peggy Lin & Hennessy Liu & Pantin Pan, Joel Zhang & Alex Chen, Vic Shi & William Wang, Jenna Wang, Alice Qiu, Ivan Cao, Samantha Yu, Ellen Chen, Vickie Wang	20
2	May 16, 2008	Chen Chu Xiang	Yan Li Ting	Liu Yi Ting, Wu Zhong Yan, Zhao Yu Si, Wu Xiang Zhen, Li Xiu Wen, Wu Juan Yi, Liao Fang Ge, Chen Wei Bin, Lin Shi Qi, Li Shu Yan, Katie Zhang Shu Ning, Jian Zi Qi, Lin Jia Ling, Wu Shou Ming, Wu Min Fan, Lin Yi Jun, Huang Bai Lu, Liu Yu Rou, Chen Yi Lun, Zhang Yong Zheng	22

== Season 1 ==
The winner of the competition was 21-year-old He Wan Ting, better known as Tina He. She received: a modeling contract with Catwalk Production House and a brand new Nissan Micra worth ¥420.000.

=== Contestants ===
Contestant	Nickname	Age	Height	Outcome	Place
Zhang Yong Xin	Kelly	21	1.69 m (5 ft 6 1/2 in)	Week 1	20 (quit)
Chen Yan Liang	Chris	21	1.77 m (5 ft 9 1/2 in)	Week 1	19-17
Yao Shi Ying	Joanne	23	1.66 m (5 ft 5 1/2 in)	Week 1	19-17
Gao Zong Yu	Tommy	23	1.83 m (6 ft 0 in)	Week 1	19-17
Zhuang Yu Da	James	28	1.77 m (5 ft 9 1/2 in)	Week 2	16-13
Lin Pei Ru	Peggy	23	1.62 m (5 ft 4 in)	Week 2	16-13
Liu Han Qi	Hennessy	23	1.81 m (5 ft 11 1/2 in)	Week 2	16-13
Pan Ya Ting	Pantin	24	1.73 m (5 ft 8 in)	Week 2	16-13
Zhang Wei Cheng	Joel	21	1.77 m (5 ft 9 1/2 in)	Week 9	12-11
Wang Cheng Xuan	Alex	22	1.70 m (5 ft 7 in)	Week 9	12-11
Chen Kui	Vic	26	1.78 m (5 ft 10 in)	Week 11	10-9
Shi De Wei	William	22	1.82 m (5 ft 11 1/2 in)	Week 11	10-9
Wang Si Ping	Jenna	20	1.72 m (5 ft 7 1/2 in)	Week 13	8
Qiu Yu Fang	Alice	20	1.75 m (5 ft 9 in)	Week 13	7
Cao Shu He	Ivan	19	1.77 m (5 ft 9 1/2 in)	Week 13	6
Yu Qi	Samantha	21	1.71 m (5 ft 7 1/2 in)	Week 13	5
Chen Yi Jin	Ellen	19	1.72 m (5 ft 7 1/2 in)	Week 13	4
Wang Yu Ping	Vickie	21	1.74 m (5 ft 8 1/2 in)	Week 13	3
Pai Yi Hsiang	Sean	18	1.83 m (6 ft 0 in)	Week 13	2
He Wan Ting	Tina	21	1.68 m (5 ft 6 in)	Week 13	1

=== Challenge Guide ===
- Week 1 Photo shoot: Sexy couple
- Week 2 Photo shoot: Adam & Eve
- Week 4 Photo shoot: Bodysuit in pairs
- Week 5 Photo shoot: Celebrity couple for Cartier
- Week 6 Music video: "Innocent" - Gary Chaw
- Week 7 Challenge: Choreography dance with Bianca Bai for Taipei New Year's Eve Countdown Party 2007
- Week 8 Runway: Runway challenge for Big John Jeans
- Week 9 Talent show: "Who is the Big Star?"
- Week 10 Challenge: Live interview for Queen
- Week 11 Photo shoot: Angel & Devil
- Week 12 Photo shoot: Editorials for Queen Magazine

== Season 2 ==
The winner of the competition was 21-year-old Chen Chu Xiang. He received: a modeling contract with Catwalk Production House and a cash prizes worth ¥200.000.

=== Contestants ===
Contestant	Age	Height	Place
Liu Yi Ting	22	1.70 m (5 ft 7 in)	22-21
Wu Zhong Yan	24	1.77 m (5 ft 9 1/2 in)	22-21
Zhao Yu Si	19	1.84 m (6 ft 1/2 in)	20-19
Wu Xiang Zhen	18	1.84 m (6 ft 1/2 in)	20-19
Li Xiu Wen	21	1.77 m (5 ft 9 1/2 in)	18-16
Wu Juan Yi	23	1.69 m (5 ft 6 1/2 in)	18-16
Liao Fang Ge	18	1.73 m (5 ft 8 in)	18-16
Chen Wei Bin	26	1.75 m (5 ft 9 in)	15-13
Lin Shi Qi	21	1.80 m (5 ft 11 in)	15-13
Li Shu Yan	24	1.62 m (5 ft 4 in)	15-13
Katie Zhang Shu Ning	23	1.65 m (5 ft 5 in)	12-11
Jian Zi Qi	25	1.88 m (6 ft 2 in)	12-11
Lin Jia Ling	21	1.74 m (5 ft 8 1/2 in)	10
Wu Shou Ming	21	1.82 m (5 ft 11 1/2 in)	9
Wu Min Fan	22	1.85 m (6 ft 1 in)	8
Lin Yi Jun	23	1.73 m (5 ft 8 in)	7
Huang Bai Lu	26	1.68 m (5 ft 6 in)	6
Liu Yu Rou	21	1.75 m (5 ft 9 in)	5
Chen Yi Lun	23	1.87 m (6 ft 1 1/2 in)	4
Zhang Yong Zheng	23	1.70 m (5 ft 7 in)	3
Yan Li Ting	27	1.70 m (5 ft 7 in)	2
Chen Chu Xiang	21	1.86 m (6 ft 1 in)	1
