= Suomen huippumalli haussa season 5 =

Suomen huippumalli haussa
- Season 5

Release
- Original network: Nelonen
- Original release: September 3 – November 19, 2012

Season chronology
- ← Previous; Season 4 Next → Season 6

Cycle five of Suomen huippumalli haussa began airing on September 3, 2012 at 20.00 on the Finnish channel Nelonen. The winner of the competition was 22-year-old Meri Ikonen who won a modeling contract with Paparazzi Model Management, a spread in Finnish Elle, the chance to become the new spokesperson for Max Factor and a trip to the capital of Iceland.

== Episode summaries ==
=== Episode 1 ===
Original airdate: 3 September 2012

Casting episode.

=== Episode 2 ===
Original airdate: 10 September 2012

The 11 girls arrive at the house and head to the Blistek Ad photo shoot. At panel, Viivi was praised for her photograph. Despite landing in the bottom two, Nelli-Kaneli and Vilma are both saved but told to step up their game.

- First call-out: Viivi Luopa
- Bottom two: Nelli-Kaneli Wasenius & Vilma Karjalainen
- Eliminated: None

=== Episode 3 ===
Original airdate: 17 September 2012

At the house, Nelli-Kaneli doubts her place in the competition. The contestants participate in a Kalevara Jewellery ad. At the proceeding panel, Sanna and Matleena had stellar photos. Before Anne reveals the best model of the week, Nelli-Kaneli interrupts her and tells her that she wants to quit the competition due to her lack of motivation, despite taking a decent photo. Before the episode concludes, Malla and Nevena land in the bottom two, and Nevena is eliminated for being too inconsistent. Later, Anne announces that the contestants will go to Iceland.

- Quit: Nelli-Kaneli Wasenius
- First call-out: Sanna Takalampi
- Bottom two: Malla Hyytiäinen & Nevena Ek
- Eliminated: Nevena Ek

=== Episode 4 ===
Original airdate: 24 September 2012

The contestants head to Iceland to their photo shoot. The panel was removed for this episode in Iceland at a lake. Annika surprises the judges with a stellar photo; Meri and Malla land in the bottom two for having a weak photo. In the end, the judges felt that Meri had more potential, and Malla was sent home.

- First call-out: Annika Åkerfeld
- Bottom two: Malla Hyytiäinen & Meri Ikonen
- Eliminated: Malla Hyytiäinen

=== Episode 5 ===
Original airdate: 1 October 2012

Quite upset about the elimination, the contestants fly back to Finland for their next shoot. The brief was to show happiness. Although Katja brought positive energy, she couldn't deliver a decent shot, same as Sanna. Both land in the Bottom two; the judges felt Sanna had still more potential than Katja, and Katja was sent home.

- First call-out: Matleena Helander
- Bottom two: Katja Soisalo & Sanna Takalampi
- Eliminated: Katja Soisalo

=== Episode 6 ===
Original airdate: 8 October 2012

The contestants do their first edgy photo shoot. Meri received the most praise, giving her best photo of the week. Vilma and Viivi are the last to stand; Vilma for not giving enough, and Viivi for not showing any kind of desire to stay. In the end, the judges felt Vilma had shown enough, and she was sent packing.

- First call-out: Meri Ikonen
- Bottom two: Viivi Luopa & Vilma Karjalainen
- Eliminated: Vilma Karjalainen

=== Episode 7 ===
Original airdate: 15 October 2012

At the photo shoot, the contestants did an ad for lingerie, where Annika excelled. Sanna and Viivi are once again the last two standing; Sanna for having a weak photograph, and Viivi for still not showing desire. In the end, Viivi's photo was deemed better and Sanna became the sixth girl to leave the competition.

- First call-out: Annika Åkerfeld
- Bottom two: Sanna Takalampi & Viivi Luopa
- Eliminated: Sanna Takalampi

=== Episode 8 ===
Original airdate: 22 October 2012

The final five does a high photo shoot, where they have to portray gods. Meri showed once again a powerful shot, and gets picture of the week for a second time. Polina and Viivi struggled. Since it was her third consecutive time in the bottom two, Viivi was eliminated.

- First call-out: Meri Ikonen
- Bottom two: Polina Hiekkala & Viivi Luopa
- Eliminated: Viivi Luopa

=== Episode 9 ===
Original airdate: 29 October 2012

The final four does an ad for Clark shoes. Matleena excelled once again and got picture of the week. Meri and Annika land in the bottom two, Meri for her second time. The judges deemed Meri to be more ready than Annika; ultimately Meri was a part of the final three, and Annika was sent home.

- First call-out: Matleena Helander
- Bottom two: Annika Åkerfeld & Meri Ikonen
- Eliminated: Annika Åkerfeld

=== Episode 10 ===
Original airdate: 5 November 2012

- Eliminated: None

=== Episode 11 ===
Original airdate: 12 November 2012

- Eliminated: None

=== Episode 12 ===
Original airdate: 19 November 2012

The last three contestants, Meri, Matleena and Polina do a fashion show. The relatives come to watch the show. During final deliberation, Anne looks at every girl's performance and amendment. She compares; Matleena who hadn't stood one single time in the bottom two, Meri who made the biggest improvement, and Polina who has a funny personality and gets booked for that. In the end, Meri was selected to be the fifth winner of Finland's Next Top Model.

- Final three: Matleena Helander, Meri Ikonen & Polina Hiekkala
- Finland's Next Top Model: Meri Ikonen

== Contestants ==
(Ages stated are at start of contest)

Contestant	Age	Height	Hometown	Finish	Place
Nelli-Kaneli Wasenius	20	1.73 m (5 ft 8 in)	Joensuu	Episode 3	11 (quit)
Nevena Ek	18	1.75 m (5 ft 9 in)	Heinola	Episode 3	10
Malla Hyytiäinen	19	1.75 m (5 ft 9 in)	Kellokoski	Episode 4	9
Katja Soisalo	18	1.825 m (6 ft 0 in)	Ilmajoki	Episode 5	8
Vilma Karjalainen	18	1.80 m (5 ft 11 in)	Espoo	Episode 6	7
Sanna Takalampi	18	1.79 m (5 ft 10 1/2 in)	Hyllykallio	Episode 7	6
Viivi Luopa	18	1.81 m (5 ft 11 1/2 in)	Teuva	Episode 8	5
Annika Åkerfeldt	18	1.76 m (5 ft 9 1/2 in)	Helsinki	Episode 9	4
Polina Hiekkala	20	1.77 m (5 ft 9 1/2 in)	Lappeenranta	Episode 12	3–2
Matleena Helander	19	1.81 m (5 ft 11 1/2 in)	Espoo	Episode 12	3–2
Meri Ikonen	22	1.81 m (5 ft 11 1/2 in)	Tampere	Episode 12	1

== Summaries ==
=== Call-out order ===
Order	Episodes									
Order	1	2	3	4	5	6	7	8	9	12
1	Nelli-Kaneli	Viivi	Sanna	Annika	Matleena	Meri	Annika	Meri	Matleena	Meri
2	Viivi	Sanna	Matleena	Matleena	Viivi	Matleena	Matleena	Annika	Polina	Matleena; Polina
3	Polina	Polina	Viivi	Katja	Polina	Polina	Meri	Matleena	Meri	Matleena; Polina
4	Annika	Meri	Meri	Viivi	Vilma	Sanna	Polina	Polina	Annika	
5	Sanna	Matleena	Polina	Polina	Annika	Annika	Viivi	Viivi		
6	Matleena	Nevena	Katja	Vilma	Meri	Viivi	Sanna			
7	Vilma	Annika	Annika	Sanna	Sanna	Vilma				
8	Nevena	Malla	Vilma	Meri	Katja					
9	Katja	Katja	Malla	Malla						
10	Meri	Nelli-Kaneli; Vilma	Nevena							
11		Nelli-Kaneli; Vilma	Nelli-Kaneli							

The contestant was part of a non-elimination bottom two
The contestant withdrew from the competition
The contestant was eliminated
The contestant won the competition

- In Episode 1, the group of semi-finalists was whittled down to 10 finalists. Out of the four girls eliminated (Leena, Malla, Noora and Ruut), Malla was voted as the eleventh finalist by the public, joining the competition the following episode.
- In Episode 3, Nelli-Kaneli quit the competition before the elimination.
- In Episodes 10 and 11, there was no elimination.

=== Photo shoot guide ===
- Episode 1 photo shoots: Promotional shots; B&W beauty shots (casting)
- Episode 2 photo shoot: Blistex ads
- Episode 3 photo shoot: Kalevala jewelry ads
- Episode 4 photo shoot: Cailap hair accessories
- Episode 5 photo shoot: Sonera Buddy campaign
- Episode 6 photo shoot: TRESemmé campaign
- Episode 7 photo shoot: Change lingerie
- Episode 8 photo shoot: Goddesses on a rooftop
- Episode 9 photo shoot: Clarks shoe ads
- Episode 10 photo shoot: Fida campaign pictures
- Episode 11 photo shoot: Cosmopolitan
- Episode 12 photo shoot: Max Factor ads
