= Suomen huippumalli haussa season 4 =

Suomen huippumalli haussa
- Season 4

Release
- Original network: Nelonen
- Original release: September 12, 2011

Season chronology
- ← Previous; Season 3 Next → Season 5

Cycle four of Suomen huippumalli haussa began airing on 12 September 2011 at 20:00 on the Finnish channel Nelonen. It is the fourth cycle of Suomen huippumalli haussa (English: Search for Finland's top model), which is a Finnish reality show based on America's Next Top Model.

The winner of the competition was 20-year-old Anna-Sofia Ali-Sisto, from Oulu. As her prizes, she received a modeling contract with Paparazzi Model Management, a 6-page editorial spread in Finnish Trendi, a special casting trip to New York and the chance to become the new spokesperson for Max Factor.

== Episode 1 ==
Casting episode.

== Episode 2 ==
The 12 contestants arrive at the model house and head straight to the photo shoot with Nigel Barker. Barker is a former judge and photographer on America's Next Top Model.

== Episode 3 ==
The remaining contestants compete as they show their modeling skills in an advertisement for Pepsodent.

== Episode 4 ==
The remaining 10 contestants are facing with impressing a rock star, and work hard to separate themselves from the pack. Anne announces that the remaining girls (who survive elimination) are going to London as the competition continues.

== Episode 5 ==
The remaining 8 contestants fly to London for a photo shoots for a Vero Moda ad campaign. Eevi and Anna-Sofia were deemed the top two contenders and were selected to participate in a two-group-shot.

== Episode 6 ==
The remaining Top 7 do an ad for Kalevara Jewelry.

== Episode 7 ==
In the next photo shoot, the contestants are challenged to bring different emotions, and show their versatility.

== Episode 8 ==
The final five contestants arrive in Portugal and head to a photo shoots where they'll model various bikini and scarf items.

== Episode 10 ==
Recap Episode.

== Episode 11 ==
The final three contestants do a black & white photo shoot.

== Episode 12 ==
The final two contestants compete for the title with a Max Factor beauty shots and a runway show.

== Contestants ==
(ages stated are at start of contest)

Contestant	Age	Hometown	Height	Rank	Place
Hilda Nissinen	18	Kerava	5 ft 9.7 in (1.77 m)	Episode 2	12
Roosa Puonti	18	Kotka	5 ft 6.5 in (1.69 m)	Episode 3	11
Sahra Ali Mohamud	23	Espoo	5 ft 7.7 in (1.72 m)	Episode 4	10–9
Jannimaaria 'Janni' Puuppo	20	Tampere	5 ft 11 in (1.80 m)	Episode 4	10–9
Veronica Kontio	24	Helsinki	5 ft 11 in (1.80 m)	Episode 5	8
Mari Viitanen	18	Tampere	5 ft 7.7 in (1.72 m)	Episode 6	7
Nelli Junttila	20	Helsinki	5 ft 7 in (1.70 m)	Episode 7	6
Elsi Pulkkinen	19	Oulu	5 ft 8.5 in (1.74 m)	Episode 8	5
Eevi Nieminen	18	Siuntio	5 ft 11.5 in (1.82 m)	Episode 9	4
Minna Puro	20	Helsinki	5 ft 8 in (1.73 m)	Episode 11	3
Helen Preis	20	Lappeenranta	5 ft 9.3 in (1.76 m)	Episode 12	2
Anna-Sofia Ali-Sisto	20	Oulu	5 ft 9.4 in (1.76 m)	Episode 12	1

== Summaries ==
=== Call-out order ===
Order	Episodes										
Order	1	2	3	4	5	6	7	8	9	11	12
1	Sahra	Mari	Mari	Helen	Eevi	Anna-Sofia	Elsi	Helen	Minna	Helen	Anna-Sofia
2	Helen	Helen	Veronica	Nelli	Anna-Sofia	Nelli	Minna	Minna	Anna-Sofia	Anna-Sofia	Helen
3	Anna-Sofia	Eevi	Elsi	Eevi	Elsi	Eevi	Anna-Sofia	Eevi	Helen	Minna	
4	Hilda	Minna	Sahra	Veronica	Minna	Minna	Helen	Anna-Sofia	Eevi		
5	Minna	Sahra	Anna-Sofia	Anna-Sofia	Mari	Helen	Eevi	Elsi			
6	Elsi	Janni	Minna	Elsi	Helen	Elsi	Nelli				
7	Nelli	Anna-Sofia	Helen	Mari	Nelli	Mari					
8	Eevi	Nelli	Nelli	Minna	Veronica						
9	Mari	Elsi	Eevi	Janni; Sahra							
10	Roosa	Veronica	Janni	Janni; Sahra							
11	Veronica	Roosa	Roosa								
12	Janni	Hilda									

The contestant was eliminated
The contestant won the competition

- Episode 1 was the casting episode.
- In Episode 4 a trip to London was planned and both Janni and Sahra were eliminated at the airport.
- Episode 10 was the recap episode.
