= Suomen huippumalli haussa season 6 =

Suomen huippumalli haussa
- Season 6

Release
- Original network: Nelonen; Liv
- Original release: March 15 – May 17, 2017

Season chronology
- ← Previous; Season 5 Next → Season 7

Suomen huippumalli haussa, Cycle 6 is the sixth season of the Suomen huippumalli haussa series that began to air on 15 March 2017. The judging panel was revamped with Maryam Razavi as the host, and Juri Silvennoinen and Marica Rosengård as co-judges. Additionally, male hopefuls were allowed to apply introducing a co-ed cycle.

The winner of the competition was 20 year old Jerry Koivisto from Hämeenkyrö. He won a modeling contract with Paparazzi Model Management, appeared on the cover of Cosmopolitan, a trip to New York City for castings and a diamond jewelry box from Alexander Tillander.

== Cast ==
=== Contestants ===
(Ages stated are at start of contest)

Contestant	Age	Height	Hometown	Finish	Place
Emilia Hölttä	18	1.76 m (5 ft 9 1/2 in)	Mikkeli	Episode 2	12
Ville Mäkäräinen	19	1.91 m (6 ft 3 in)	Kuopio	Episode 3	11
Emilia Ylenius	18	1.82 m (5 ft 11 1/2 in)	Espoo	Episode 4	10-9
Jesse Halt	18	1.82 m (5 ft 11 1/2 in)	Vihti	Episode 4	10-9
Anniina Sankoh	20	1.84 m (6 ft 1/2 in)	Helsinki	Episode 5	8
Henrik Lyly	19	1.95 m (6 ft 5 in)	Järvenpää	Episode 6	7
Robert Tollet	17	1.90 m (6 ft 3 in)	Helsinki	Episode 7	6-5
Roosa Marttila	20	1.78 m (5 ft 10 in)	Jyväskylä	Episode 7	6-5
Juuso Salpakari	17	1.87 m (6 ft 1 1/2 in)	Kuopio	Episode 9	4-3
Vilja Tuohisto-Kokko	18	1.84 m (6 ft 1/2 in)	Ilmajoki	Episode 9	4-3
Sofia Öster	17	1.85 m (6 ft 1 in)	Veikkaala	Episode 10	2
Jerry Koivisto	20	1.86 m (6 ft 1 in)	Hämeenkyrö	Episode 10	1

=== Judges ===
- Maryam Razavi (host)
- Marica Rosengård
- Juri Silvennoinen

== Episodes ==
=== Episode 1 ===
Original airdate: March 15, 2017

This was the casting episode.

=== Episode 2 ===
Original airdate: March 22, 2017

- First call-out: Jerry Koivisto
- Bottom two: Emilia Hölttä & Emilia Ylenius
- Eliminated: Emilia Hölttä

=== Episode 3 ===
Original airdate: March 29, 2017

- First call-out: Sofia Öster
- Bottom three: Jesse Halt, Vilja Tuohisto-Kokko & Ville Mäkäräinen
- Eliminated: Ville Mäkäräinen

=== Episode 4 ===
Original airdate: April 5, 2017

- First call-out: Juuso Salpakari
- Bottom three: Emilia Ylenius, Jesse Halt & Robert Tollet
- Eliminated: Emilia Ylenius & Jesse Halt

=== Episode 5 ===
Original airdate: April 12, 2017

- First call-out: Henrik Lyly & Vilja Tuohisto-Kokko
- Bottom two: Anniina Sankoh & Juuso Salpakari
- Eliminated: Anniina Sankoh

=== Episode 6 ===
Original airdate: April 19, 2017

- Challenge winner: Juuso Salpakari
- First call-out: Robert Tollet
- Bottom two: Henrik Lyly & Roosa Marttila
- Eliminated: Henrik Lyly

=== Episode 7 ===
Original airdate: April 26, 2017

- Challenge winner: Juuso Salpakari & Robert Tollet
- First call-out: Vilja Tuohisto-Kokko
- Bottom four: Jerry Koivisto, Robert Tollet, Roosa Marttila & Sofia Öster
- Eliminated: Robert Tollet & Roosa Marttila

=== Episode 8 ===
Original airdate: May 3, 2017

- Challenge winner: Vilja Tuohisto-Kokko
- First call-out: Sofia Öster
- Bottom two: Jerry Koivisto & Juuso Salpakari
- Eliminated: None

=== Episode 9 ===
Original airdate: May 10, 2017

- Challenge winner: Jerry Koivisto
- First call-out: Jerry Koivisto
- Bottom three: Juuso Salpakari, Sofia Öster & Vilja Tuohisto-Kokko
- Eliminated: Juuso Salpakari & Vilja Tuohisto-Kokko

=== Episode 10 ===
Original airdate: May 17, 2017

- Final two: Jerry Koivisto & Sofia Öster
- Finland's Next Top Model: Jerry Koivisto

== Results ==
=== Call-out order ===
Order	Episodes									
Order	1	2	3	4	5	6	7	8	9	10
1	Sofia	Jerry	Sofia	Juuso	Henrik; Vilja	Robert	Vilja	Sofia	Jerry	Jerry
2	Jerry	Ville	Juuso	Sofia	Henrik; Vilja	Juuso	Juuso	Vilja	Sofia	Sofia
3	Robert	Juuso	Jerry	Roosa	Sofia	Jerry	Sofia; Jerry	Jerry; Juuso	Juuso; Vilja	
4	Vilja	Roosa	Roosa	Jerry	Robert	Vilja	Sofia; Jerry	Jerry; Juuso	Juuso; Vilja	
5	Roosa	Robert	Henrik	Vilja	Roosa	Sofia	Robert; Roosa			
6	Juuso	Sofia	Robert	Henrik	Jerry	Roosa	Robert; Roosa			
7	Emilia Y.	Anniina	Anniina	Anniina	Juuso	Henrik				
8	Anniina	Jesse	Emilia Y.	Robert	Anniina					
9	Jesse	Henrik	Jesse	Emilia Y. Jesse						
10	Henrik	Vilja	Vilja	Emilia Y. Jesse						
11	Ville	Emilia Y.	Ville							
12	Emilia H.	Emilia H.								

The contestant was eliminated
The contestant was part of a non-elimination bottom two
The contestant won the competition

=== Photo shoot guide ===
- Episode 1 photo shoot: Cosmopolitan casting shots
- Episode 2 video & photo shoot: Series launch
- Episode 3 photo shoot: Marianne candy advertisements
- Episode 4 photo shoot: Kultajousi jewelry beauty shot
- Episode 5 photo shoot: Dancing in pairs for Vogue Hosieery
- Episode 6 photo shoot: Labello smiling beauty shot
- Episode 7 photo shoot: Westerback catalogue
- Episode 8 commercial & photo shoot: Biozell campaigns
- Episode 9 photo shoot: Wedding couples for Alexander Tillander jewelry
- Episode 10 photo shoot: Cosmopolitan cover
