= Anne Kukkohovi =

Finnish model and television presenter

Anne Kukkohovi (née Laaksonen; born 3 October 1970 in Vaasa) is a presenter and a retired Finnish model who has worked as a model from 1990 to 1998. She worked as an art director in an advertising agency. Kukkohovi has also been a host on the Finnish television show Sinun unelmiesi tähden at the end of the 1990s. She is currently the host of the Finnish version of America's Next Top Model, Suomen huippumalli haussa. Anne is the co-founder of Supermood, a natural Finnish skincare and wellness brand. In 2021 it was reported that Supermood Oy was in great financial difficulties, it had defaulted in tax and other payments. It had also changed its name to Heartflip Oy. According to the Finnish Business Information System (government service), in 2023 Heartflip Oy had stopped operating entirely.

Kukkohovi was married to Joni Kukkohovi from 2001 to 2018 and has one child. In early 2024, she moved to the Los Angeles, California, to work as an advertising model.

On May 12, 2025, Finnish weekly magazine Seiska (published by Aller Media) reported that Anne Kukkohovi has expanded her business ventures to include selling used underwear, nude photographs of herself, and offering so called penis ratings.

According to investigative journalist Panu Hörkkö, Kukkohovi sells her used underwear for $500 and ships them in ziplocked plastic bags to preserve their scent. Additionally, Kukkohovi operates an OnlyFans account and provides a service called "penis ratings," where clients send her a picture of a penis, and she creates a video in which she describes and evaluates it in detail.
