= Saimi Hoyer =

Finnish model and television personality (born 1974)

Saimi Hoyer (née Nousiainen; born 18 June 1974) is a Finnish model and television personality. Her unique look helped her become one of the most successful models in Finland.

== Life ==
She was born on 18 June 1974 in Helsinki. Her parents were actors Soila Komi and Jyrki Nousiainen.

Before modeling, Hoyer studied at Sibelius Academy. After this, she studied Hungarian, Italian and literature at the University of Jyväskylä. Her modeling career began when a photographer "discovered" her at a concert while she was on exchange in Florence, Italy studying theatre. Hoyer got to walk the catwalk in Milan, Paris, London, New York City and Tokyo and worked for Diesel and Burberry. Her photos have been seen in Italy and featured on the pages of US Vogue and Marie Claire.

Hoyer retired from modeling in 2003 and became an editor for Image magazine and a columnist for the magazine MeNaiset. She has also written columns for Savon Sanomat and has been a weather reporter for Nelonen. She currently writes articles for the magazine Anna.

In 2005, Hoyer hosted the MTV3 show Mallikoulu 2005 where she taught promising models how to walk on the runway. In 2006, she did the MTV3 style show Unisex, along with Arman Alizad and Heli Roiha. In one episode, she criticised the Jokapoika collection by Marimekko as being old-fashioned. Marimekko CEO Kirsti Paakkanen gave a statement, which was later withdrawn.

Hoyer married financial director Thomas Hoyer in 2006. They have two children, Kaspar and Hektor. Hoyer and her husband filed for divorce in 2018.
