= Drag Race Holland season 2 =

Second season of Drag Race Holland

Drag Race Holland
- Season 2
- Promotional poster for season 2
- Hosted by: Fred van Leer
- Judges: Fred van Leer; Marieke Samallo
- No. of contestants: 10
- Winner: Vanessa Van Cartier
- Runner-up: My Little Puny
- Miss Congeniality: Tabitha
- No. of episodes: 8

Release
- Original network: Videoland (Netherlands); WOW Presents Plus (International)
- Original release: 6 August – 24 September 2021

Season chronology
- ← Previous; Season 1

The second and final season of Drag Race Holland premiered on 6 August and concluded on 24 September 2021. The competition is broadcast on Videoland in the Netherlands and on WOW Presents Plus internationally. The competition sees ten Dutch drag queens compete for the title of the next Dutch Drag Superstar, a cash prize of €15,000, a crown and scepter by Fierce Drag Jewels, and a stage on the 2022 edition of the Dutch Milkshake festival.

The cast was officially announced via social media on 27 July 2021.

The winner of the second season was Vanessa Van Cartier, with My Little Puny ending as runner-up.

== Contestants ==
Ages, names, and cities stated are at time of filming.

Contestants of Drag Race Holland season 2 and their backgrounds
Contestant	Age	Hometown	Outcome
Vanessa Van Cartier	41	Rotterdam, South Holland	Winner
My Little Puny	38	Amsterdam, North Holland	Runner-up
Vivaldi	22	Enschede, Overijssel	3rd place
Keta Minaj	40	Amsterdam, North Holland	4th place
Tabitha	46	Amsterdam, North Holland	5th place (Note: Tabitha was voted Miss Congeniality by fellow contestants.)
The Countess	21	Amsterdam, North Holland	6th place
Ivy-Elyse (Note: Ivy-Elyse Monroe is referred to as Ivy-Elyse on the show.)	35	Amsterdam, North Holland	7th place
Love Masisi	43	Amsterdam, North Holland	8th place
Reggy B (Note: Miss Reggy B is referred to as Reggy B on the show.)	25	Amsterdam, North Holland	9th place
Juicy Kutoure	24	Amsterdam, North Holland	10th place

== Contestant progress ==
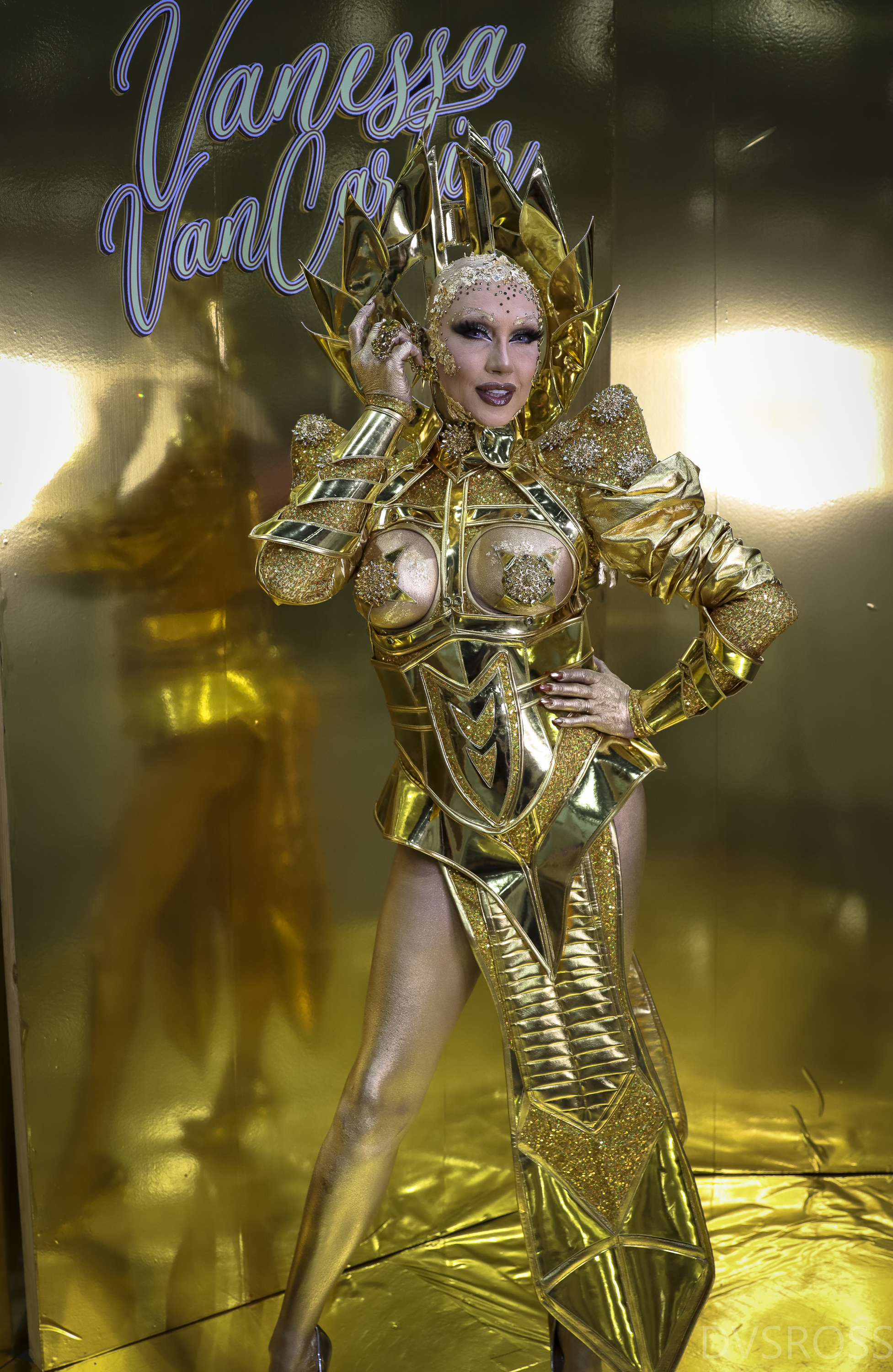
Vanessa Van Cartier in 2022

Legend:

Vanessa Van Cartier won Drag Race Holland season 2.
My Little Puny was the runner-up.
Tabitha was voted Miss Congeniality (Miss C).
WIN indicates that the contestant won the challenge.
SAFE indicates that the contestant was declared safe by the judges.
BTM (Bottom) indicates that the contestant was up for elimination.
ELIM (Eliminated) indicates that the contestant was eliminated.
Guest indicates that the contestant returned as a guest.

Contestants progress with placements in each episode
Contestant	Episode							
Contestant	1	2	3	4	5	6	7	8
Vanessa Van Cartier	SAFE	SAFE	SAFE	SAFE	WIN	SAFE	SAFE	Winner
My Little Puny	SAFE	SAFE	SAFE	WIN	BTM	SAFE	WIN	Runner-up
Vivaldi	SAFE	SAFE	WIN	SAFE	SAFE	BTM	BTM	Eliminated
Keta Minaj	WIN	SAFE	WIN	SAFE	SAFE	WIN	ELIM	Guest
Tabitha	SAFE	SAFE	SAFE	SAFE	BTM	ELIM		Miss C
The Countess	SAFE	WIN	SAFE	BTM	ELIM			Guest
Ivy-Elyse	SAFE	BTM	BTM	ELIM				Guest
Love Masisi	SAFE	SAFE	ELIM					Guest
Reggy B	BTM	ELIM						Guest
Juicy Kutoure	ELIM							Guest

== Lip syncs ==
Legend:

The contestant was eliminated after their first time in the bottom.
The contestant was eliminated after their second time in the bottom.
The contestant was eliminated after their third time in the bottom.
The contestant won the Lip Sync for the Crown and was declared the winner of the season.

Episode	Contestants			Song	Eliminated
1	Juicy Kutoure	vs.	Reggy B	"Physical" (Dua Lipa)	Juicy Kutoure
2	Ivy-Elyse	vs.	Reggy B	"Don't Leave Me This Way" (Thelma Houston)	Reggy B
3	Ivy-Elyse	vs.	Love Masisi	"It's All Coming Back to Me Now" (Celine Dion)	Love Masisi
4	Ivy-Elyse	vs.	The Countess	"Free Your Mind" (En Vogue)	Ivy-Elyse
5	My Little Puny vs. Tabitha vs. The Countess			"Call Me Mother" (RuPaul)	The Countess
6	Tabitha	vs.	Vivaldi	"Lekker met de meiden" (Merel Baldé)	Tabitha
7	Keta Minaj	vs.	Vivaldi	"Don't Stop Me Now" (Queen)	Keta Minaj
Episode	Contestants			Song	Winner
8	My Little Puny	vs.	Vanessa Van Cartier	"This Is My Life" (Shirley Bassey)	Vanessa Van Cartier

== Guest judges ==
On 4 August 2021, Marieke Samallo was confirmed to be Nikkie Plessen's replacement as main judge. Carlo Boszhard and Raven van Dorst were confirmed to be rotating judges.

Listed in chronological order:

- Elise Schaap, actress and singer
- Soundos El Ahmadi, actress and stand-up comedian
- Buddy Vedder, actor and presenter
- Freek Bartels, singer, actor and presenter
- Alex Klaasen, comedian, singer and actor
- Merol, singer and actress
- Tina de Bruin, actress
- Glennis Grace, singer
- Envy Peru, winner on the first season of Drag Race Holland

=== Special guests ===
Guests who appeared in episodes, but did not judge on the main stage.

Episode 1

- ChelseaBoy, contestant on the first season of Drag Race Holland
- Envy Peru, winner on the first season of Drag Race Holland
- Janey Jacké, runner-up on the first season of Drag Race Holland
- Madame Madness, contestant on the first season of Drag Race Holland
- Ma'Ma Queen, contestant on the first season of Drag Race Holland
- Megan Schoonbrood, contestant on the first season of Drag Race Holland
- Miss Abby OMG, contestant on the first season of Drag Race Holland
- Patty Pam-Pam, contestant on the first season of Drag Race Holland
- Roem, contestant on the first season of Drag Race Holland
- Sederginne, contestant on the first season of Drag Race Holland

Episode 3

- Elise Schaap, actress and singer

Episode 4

- Dusty Gersanowitz, drag queen
- Gerald van Windt, choreographer
- Damian Overduyn, assistant choreographer

Episode 5

- Dolf Pasker and Gert Kasteel, first legally recognized same-sex married couple worldwide

Episode 6

- Catherine Keyl, presenter

Episode 7

- Ferry Doedens, actor

Episode 8

- Famke Louise, YouTuber and singer
- Josephine Kay, Cosmopolitan editor
- Ma'Ma Queen, Miss Congenialty of season 1

== Episodes ==
No. overall	No. in season	Title	Original release date
9	1	"Who's That Queen?"	6 August 2021
Ten new queens enter the workroom.. For this week's maxi challenge, the queens will perform a talent show in front of the judges.: Ivy-Elyse - Silk Veil Poi; Juicy Kutoure - Posing/Spoken Word; Keta Minaj - Magic; Love Masisi - Singing; My Little Puny - Pole Dancing; Reggy B - Rapping; Tabitha - Salsa Dancing; The Countess - Piano; Vanessa Van Cartier - Performance Art; Vivaldi - Burlesque; On the runway, category is Nightlife Extravaganza. Keta Minaj, My Little Puny, Vanessa Van Cartier and Vivaldi receive positive critiques, with Keta Minaj winning the challenge. Ivy-Elyse, Juice Kutoure and Reggy B receive negative critiques, with Ivy-Elyse being safe. Juicy Kutoure and Reggy B lip-sync to "Physical" by Dua Lipa. Reggy B wins the lip-sync and Juicy Kutoure is the first queen to sashay away.: Alternating Judge: Carlo Boszhard; Guest Judge: Elise Schaap; Main Challenge: Perform a talent show in front of the judges; Runway Theme: Nightlife Extravaganza; Challenge Winner: Keta Minaj; Challenge Prize: A Badge and a Sonos speaker system, worth €1,000; Bottom Two: Juicy Kutoure and Reggy B; Lip-Sync Song: "Physical" by Dua Lipa; Eliminated: Juicy Kutoure; Farewell Message: "NIET VERGETEN, POSEREN TEEF x Juicy Stinkhoer ♥" ("DON'T FORGET, POSE BITCH x Juicy Stinkhoer ♥")
10	2	"Ooh, I Got Sunburned!"	13 August 2021
For this week's mini-challenge, the queens will do a photoshoot on a bicycle. The Countess wins the mini-challenge. For the main challenge, the queens will create a couture outfit made from camping materials. On the runway, category is Glamping Couture. Love Masisi, The Countess and Vivaldi receive positive critiques, with The Countess winning the challenge. Ivy-Elyse, Reggy B and Tabitha receive negative critiques, with Tabitha being safe. Ivy-Elyse and Reggy B lip-sync to "Don't Leave Me This Way" by Thelma Houston. Ivy-Elyse wins the lip-sync and Reggy B sashays away.: Alternating Judge: Carlo Boszhard; Guest Judge: Soundos El Ahmadi; Mini-Challenge: Photoshoot on a bicycle; Mini-Challenge Winner: The Countess; Main Challenge: Create a couture outfit made from camping materials; Runway Theme: Glamping Couture; Challenge Winner: The Countess; Challenge Prize: A Badge and a Bernina's sewing machine, worth €1,000; Bottom Two: Ivy-Elyse and Reggy B; Lip-Sync Song: "Don't Leave Me This Way" by Thelma Houston; Eliminated: Reggy B; Farewell Message: "This is the beginning of the rest of your lives ♥ Reggy B Always in your area"
11	3	"Icons Only (Snatch Game)"	20 August 2021
For this week's mini-challenge, the queens will play Hakken In Heels. Ivy-Elyse wins the mini-challenge. For the main challenge, the queens will play the Snatch Game. Carlo Boszhard and Elise Schaap star as the celebrity contestants. The cast consisted of: Ivy-Elyse as Cardi B; Keta Minaj as Sophie Anderson; Love Masisi as Grace Jones; My Little Puny as Marijke Helwegen; Tabitha as Kim Holland; The Countess as Louis XIV; Vanessa Van Cartier as Queen Mathilde; Vivaldi as Nikkie Plessen; On the runway, category is Monster Ball. Keta Minaj, My Little Puny and Vivaldi receive positive critiques, with Keta Minaj and Vivaldi both winning the challenge. Ivy-Elyse, Love Masisi and Tabitha receive negative critiques, with Tabitha being safe. Ivy-Elyse and Love Masisi lip-sync to "It's All Coming Back to Me Now" by Celine Dion. Ivy-Elyse wins the lip-sync and Love Masisi sashays away.: Alternating Judge: Carlo Boszhard; Guest Judge: Buddy Vedder; Mini-Challenge: Hakken In Heels; Mini-Challenge Winner: Ivy-Elyse; Main Challenge: Snatch Game; Runway Theme: Monster Ball; Challenge Winners: Keta Minaj and Vivaldi; Challenge Prize: A Badge and a €1,000 tip, courtesy of House of Bratz; Bottom Two: Ivy-Elyse and Love Masisi; Lip-Sync Song: "It's All Coming Back to Me Now" by Celine Dion; Eliminated: Love Masisi; Farewell Message: "Lieve girls, Please take care of your inner Masisi's cause no one else will Love I♥Masisi ♥"
12	4	"Cinderella in Mokum"	27 August 2021
For this week's mini-challenge, the queens will read each other to filth. My Little Puny wins the mini-challenge. For the main challenge, the queens will perform in Cinderulla: The Musical: Ivy-Elyse plays Gerda the Mermaid; Keta Minaj Plays Little Red Riding Hood; My Little Puny plays DJ Prince and Fairy Godmother; Tabitha plays Mama; The Countess plays Sleeping Beauty; Vanessa Van Cartier plays Cinderulla; Vivaldi plays Snow White; On the runway, category is Statements on the Runway. Keta Minaj, My Little Puny and Tabitha receive positive critiques, with My Little Puny winning the challenge. Ivy-Elyse, The Countess and Vanessa Van Cartier receive negative critiques, with Vanessa Van Cartier being safe. Ivy-Elyse and The Countess lip-sync to "Free Your Mind" by En Vogue. The Countess wins the lip-sync and Ivy-Elyse sashays away.: Alternating Judge: Raven van Dorst; Guest Judge: Freek Bartels; Mini-Challenge: Reading is Fundamental; Mini-Challenge Winner: My Little Puny; Main Challenge: Cinderulla: The Rusical; Runway Theme: Statements on the Runway; Challenge Winner: My Little Puny; Challenge Prize: A Badge €1000,- cheque courtesy of Loods 5.; Bottom Two: Ivy-Elyse and The Countess; Lip-Sync Song: "Free Your Mind" by En Vogue; Eliminated: Ivy-Elyse; Farewell Message: "Lieve meiden, ik ga jullie zo ontzettend missen. Love you all, en blijf altijd een trut. x Ivy-Elyse" ("Dear girls, I'm going to miss you all so much. Love you all, and always stay a bitch. x Ivy-Elyse")
13	5	"Dearly Beloved (Family Resemblance)"	3 September 2021
For this week's mini-challenge, the queens will makeover a family member, partner or friend. On the runway, category is Roots. Keta Minaj, Vanessa Van Cartier and Vivaldi receive positive critiques, with Vanessa Van Cartier winning the challenge. My Little Puny, Tabitha and The Countess receive negative critiques, and are announced as the bottom three. They lip-sync to "Call Me Mother" by RuPaul. My Little Puny and Tabitha win the lip-sync and The Countess sashays away.: Alternating Judge: Raven van Dorst; Guest Judge: Alex Klaasen; Mini-Challenge: Officiate a wedding; Mini-Challenge Winner: Keta Minaj; Main Challenge: Makeover a family member, partner or friend; Runway Theme: Roots; Challenge Winner: Vanessa Van Cartier; Challenge Prize: A Badge and a €1000,- cheque courtesy of The Make-Up Studio.; Bottom Three: My Little Puny, Tabitha and The Countess; Lip-Sync Song: "Call Me Mother" by RuPaul; Eliminated: The Countess; Farewell Message: "Lieve lieve queens. Dank jullie wel voor alles. Love you en juices. Hoogachtend The Countess" ("Dear dear queens. Thank you for everything. Love you and juices. Yours sincerely, The Countess")
14	6	"Spill the Coffee"	10 September 2021
For this week's mini-challenge, the queens will play a game of emoji memory. My Little Puny wins the mini-challenge. For the main challenge, the queens will overact in the daytime television show "Koffie Meid". On the runway, category is Opposites Attract. Keta Minaj and My Little Puny receive positive critiques, with Keta Minaj winning the challenge. Tabitha, Vanessa Van Cartier and Vivaldi receive negative critiques, with Vanessa Van Cartier being safe. Tabitha and Vivaldi lip-sync to "Lekker met de meiden" by Merol. Vivaldi wins the lip-sync and Tabitha sashays away.: Alternating Judge: Carlo Boszhard; Guest Judge: Merol; Mini-Challenge: Emoji memory; Mini-Challenge Winner: My Little Puny; Main Challenge: Overact in the daytime television show "Koffie Meid"; Runway Theme: Opposites Attract; Challenge Winner: Keta Minaj; Challenge Prize: A Badge and a €1000,- cheque courtesy of Mr B.; Bottom Two: Tabitha and Vivaldi; Lip-Sync Song: "Lekker met de meiden" by Merol; Eliminated: Tabitha; Farewell Message: "Meiden, dit is pas het begin! Ik hou van jullie. Zet het x Tabitha" ("Girls, this is only the beginning! I love you. Do it x Tabitha")
15	7	"Whodunnit"	17 September 2021
For this week's mini-challenge, the queens will impersonate a castmate in the Miss Match pageant. Vanessa Van Cartier wins the mini-challenge. For the main challenge, the queens will act in the murder mystery "De Moord op de Hak" (When the Heel Kills).: Keta Minaj plays Carla; My Little Puny plays Poes; Vanessa Van Cartier plays Pets; Vivaldi plays De Quoque; On the runway, category is Double Dutch. My Little Puny wins the challenge. Keta Minaj and Vivaldi receive negative critiques, and are announced as the bottom two. They lip-sync to "Don't Stop Me Now" by Queen. Vivaldi wins the lip-sync and Keta Minaj sashays away.: Guest Judges: Glennis Grace and Tina de Bruin; Mini-Challenge: Impersonate a castmate in the Miss Match pageant; Mini-Challenge Winner: Vanessa Van Cartier; Main Challenge: Act in the murder mystery "De Moord op de Hak" (When the Heel Kills); Runway Theme: Double Dutch; Challenge Winner: My Little Puny; Challenge Prize: A Badge and a handmade jewelry set courtesy of Aster Lab; Bottom Two: Keta Minaj and Vivaldi; Lip-Sync Song: "Don't Stop Me Now" by Queen; Eliminated: Keta Minaj; Farewell Message: "Lieve meiden, wat er ook gebeurt, wees truts op jezelf x Keta" ("Dear girls, whatever happens, be proud of yourself x Keta")
16	8	"Finale"	24 September 2021
For the final challenge of the season, the queens will write their own verse to and perform Famke Louise's song "Vieren". On the runway, the eliminated queens and the finalists present their Best Drag. It is announced that Tabitha is this season's Miss Congeniality. Vivaldi is eliminated, leaving My Little Puny and Vanessa Van Cartier as the top two queens of the season. They lip-sync to "This Is My Life" by Shirley Bassey. It is announced that Vanessa Van Cartier is the winner, leaving My Little Puny as the runner-up.: Alternating Judges: Carlo Boszhard and Raven van Dorst; Guest Judge: Envy Peru; Main Challenge: Write your own verse to and perform Famke Louise's song "Vieren"; Runway Theme: Best Drag; Miss Congeniality: Tabitha; Eliminated: Vivaldi; Top Two: My Little Puny and Vanessa Van Cartier; Lip-Sync Song: "This Is My Life" by Shirley Bassey; Runner-up: My Little Puny; Winner of Drag Race Holland Season Two: Vanessa Van Cartier
