= Drag Race Holland season 1 =

First season of Drag Race Holland

Drag Race Holland
- Season 1
- Promotional poster for season 1
- Hosted by: Fred van Leer
- Judges: Fred van Leer; Nikkie Plessen
- No. of contestants: 10
- Winner: Envy Peru
- Runner-up: Janey Jacké
- No. of episodes: 8

Release
- Original network: Videoland (Netherlands); WOW Presents Plus (International)
- Original release: 18 September – 6 November 2020

Season chronology
- Next → Season 2

The first season of Drag Race Holland premiered on 18 September and concluded on 6 November 2020. The season was available for streaming on Videoland in the Netherlands and on WOW Presents Plus internationally. The season ran for eight episodes.

The ten Dutch drag queens competed for the title of the first Dutch drag superstar, a crown, scepter and necklace by Fierce Drag Jewels, a cover shoot for Cosmopolitan magazine and a hand-made dress by Claes Iversen, worth €18,000.

The cast was officially announced on September 7, 2020.

The winner of the first season of Drag Race Holland was Envy Peru, with Janey Jacké as runner-up.

== Contestants ==
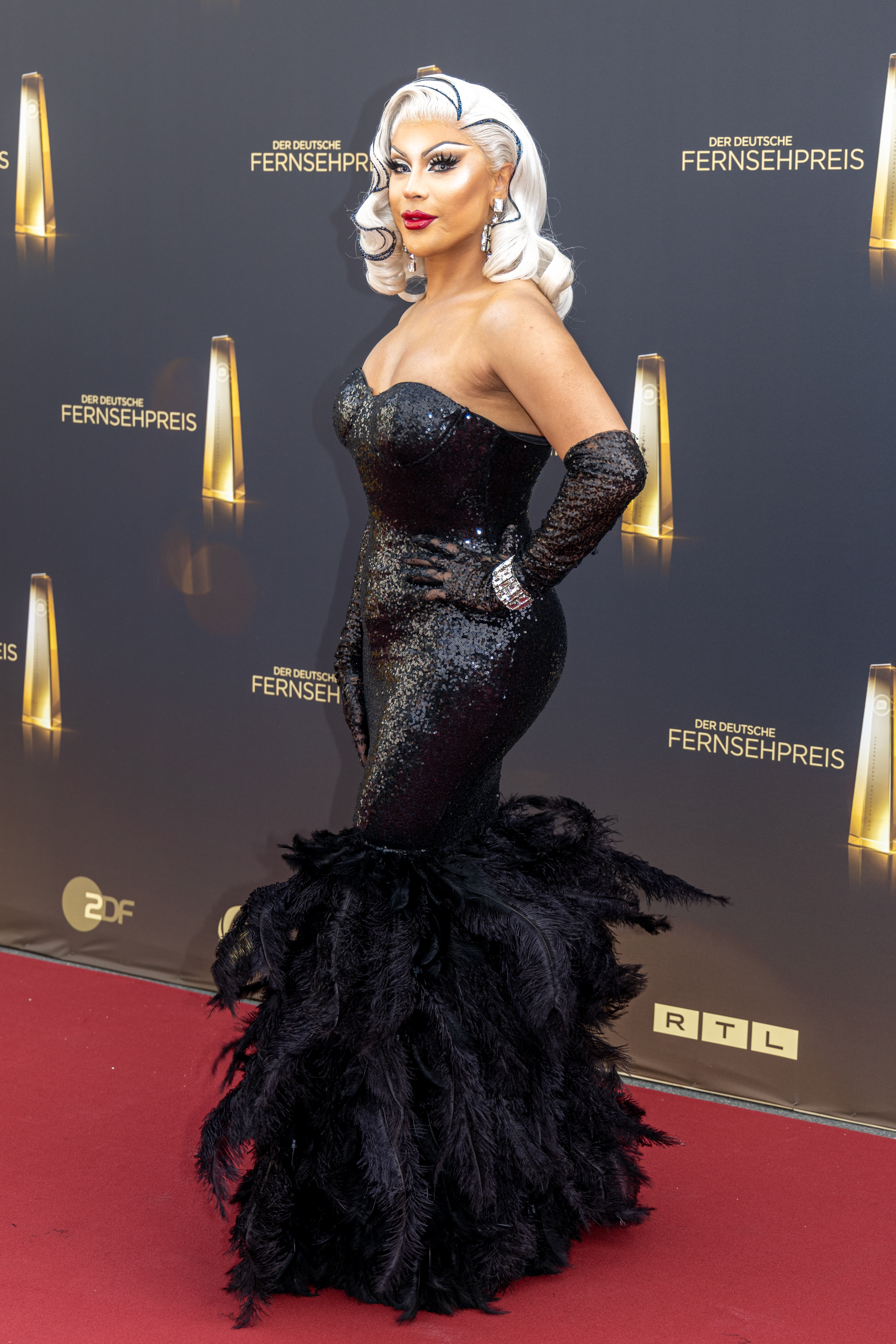
The winner, Envy Peru

Ages, names, and cities stated are at time of filming.

Contestants of Drag Race Holland season 1 and their backgrounds
Contestant	Age	Hometown	Outcome
Envy Peru	31	Amsterdam, North Holland	Winner
Janey Jacké	28	Volendam, North Holland	Runner-up
Ma'Ma Queen	30	Rotterdam, South Holland	3rd place (Note: While no Miss Congeniality was crowned on the show, Ma'Ma Queen was awarded the title unofficially by her competitors on a November 2020 reunion podcast. She later appeared on the season 2 finale to pass on the title.)
Miss Abby OMG	25	Breda, North Brabant	3rd place
ChelseaBoy	26	Amsterdam, North Holland	5th place
Sederginne	26	Antwerp, Belgium	6th place
Madame Madness	23	Amsterdam, North Holland	7th place
Megan Schoonbrood	30	Rotterdam, South Holland	8th place
Patty Pam-Pam	34	Amsterdam, North Holland	9th place
Roem	21	Urk, Flevoland	10th place

== Contestant progress ==
Legend:

Envy Peru won Drag Race Holland season 1.
Janey Jacké was the runner-up.
WIN indicates that the contestant won the challenge.
SAFE indicates that the contestant was declared safe by the judges.
BTM (Bottom) indicates that the contestant was up for elimination.
ELIM (Eliminated) indicates that the contestant was eliminated.
Guest indicates that the contestant returned as a guest.

Contestants progress with placements in each episode
Contestant	Episode							
Contestant	1	2	3	4	5	6	7	8
Envy Peru	SAFE	WIN	SAFE	WIN	WIN	WIN	SAFE	Winner
Janey Jacké	WIN	SAFE	SAFE	SAFE	SAFE	BTM	WIN	Runner-up
Ma'Ma Queen	SAFE	SAFE	WIN	BTM	SAFE	SAFE	BTM	Eliminated
Miss Abby OMG	SAFE	SAFE	BTM	BTM	BTM	SAFE	BTM	Eliminated
ChelseaBoy	SAFE	SAFE	SAFE	SAFE	SAFE	ELIM		Guest
Sederginne	SAFE	SAFE	SAFE	SAFE	ELIM			Guest
Madame Madness	SAFE	BTM	SAFE	ELIM				Guest
Megan Schoonbrood	BTM	SAFE	ELIM					Guest
Patty Pam-Pam	SAFE	ELIM						Guest
Roem	ELIM							Guest

== Lip syncs ==
Legend:

The contestant was eliminated after their first time in the bottom.
The contestant was eliminated after their second time in the bottom.
The contestant won the Lip Sync for the Crown and was declared the winner of the season.

Episode	Contestants			Song	Eliminated
1	Megan Schoonbrood	vs.	Roem	"Express Yourself" (Madonna)	Roem
2	Madame Madness	vs.	Patty Pam-Pam	"Roar" (Katy Perry)	Patty Pam-Pam
3	Megan Schoonbrood	vs.	Miss Abby OMG	"Why Tell Me, Why" (Anita Meyer)	Megan Schoonbrood
4	Madame Madness vs. Ma'Ma Queen vs. Miss Abby OMG			"I Wanna Dance with Somebody (Who Loves Me)" (Whitney Houston)	Madame Madness
5	Miss Abby OMG	vs.	Sederginne	"Girl" (Anouk)	Sederginne
6	ChelseaBoy	vs.	Janey Jacké	"9 to 5" (Dolly Parton)	ChelseaBoy
7	Ma'Ma Queen	vs.	Miss Abby OMG	"Stronger (What Doesn't Kill You)" (Kelly Clarkson)	None
Episode	Contestants			Song	Winner
8	Envy Peru	vs.	Janey Jacké	"Born This Way" (Lady Gaga)	Envy Peru

== Guest judges ==
Listed in chronological order:

- Claes Iversen, fashion designer
- Sanne Wallis de Vries, comedian
- Roxeanne Hazes, singer
- Nikkie de Jager, make-up artist, YouTuber
- Rick Paul van Mulligen, actor
- Amber Vineyard, choreographer
- Carlo Boszhard, TV host
- Ruth Jacott, singer
- Raven van Dorst, TV host
- Loiza Lamers, model, businesswoman
- Edsilia Rombley, singer

=== Special guests ===
Guests who appeared in episodes, but did not judge on the main stage.

Episode 1

- Jasper Suyk, photographer

Episode 2

- Olga Commandeur, athlete

Episode 4

- Diva Mayday, drag queen

Episode 5

- Rob Jacobs, photographer
- Monica Geuze, vlogger

Episode 6

- Niek Marijnissen, participant in The Bachelorette

Episode 7 & 8

- Gerald and Frank, choreographers

== Episodes ==
No. overall	No. in season	Title	Original release date
1	1	"Land of the Queens"	18 September 2020
Ten drag queens enter the workroom. For the first mini-challenge, the queens will do an underwater photoshoot. Miss Abby OMG wins the mini-challenge. For the main challenge, the queens will present a look based on their favorite queen.: ChelseaBoy: Alien Queen; Envy Peru: Máxima, Queen of the Night; Janey Jacké: Queen Bee; Madame Madness: Queen of Hearts; Ma'Ma Queen: Maria; Megan Schoonbrood: Diana Ross; Miss Abby OMG: Carnival Queen; Patty Pam-Pam: Freddie Mercury; Roem: Evil Queen; Sederginne: Marie Antoinette; On the runway, CheseaBoy, Janey Jacké and Sederginne receive positive critiques, with Janey Jacké winning the challenge. Ma'Ma Queen, Megan Schoonbrood and Roem receive negative critiques, with Ma'Ma Queen being safe. Megan Schoonbrood and Roem lip-sync to "Express Yourself" by Madonna. Megan Schoonbrood wins the lip-sync and Roem is the first queen to sashay away.: Alternating Judges: Claes Iversen and Sanne Wallis de Vries; Mini-Challenge: Underwater photoshoot; Mini-Challenge Winner: Miss Abby OMG; Main Challenge: Present a look based on your favorite queen; Challenge Winner: Janey Jacké; Challenge Prize: A prize package from Make-up Studio, worth €1,000; Bottom Two: Megan Schoonbrood and Roem; Lip-Sync Song: "Express Yourself" by Madonna; Eliminated: Roem; Farewell Message: "Meiden, het was gezellig. Ik ga een frikandel bakken xoxo Roem. P.S. Ik heb jullie pruiken doorgeknipt! ♡" ("Girls, it was fun. I'm going to bake a "frikandel" xoxo Roem. P.S. I cut all your wigs up! ♡")
2	2	"Give Face!"	25 September 2020
For this week's mini-challenge, the queens will design a pair of clogs and model them. ChelseaBoy and Envy Peru win the mini-challenge. For the main challenge, the queens will record a group workout video.: Team Gym Club 69: Envy Peru, Megan Schoonbrood, Patty Pam-Pam and Sederginne; Team Spice Up Your Sex Life: ChelseaBoy, Janey Jacké, Ma'Ma Queen, Madame Madness and Miss Abby OMG; On the runway, category is Give Face, Face, Face. Envy Peru, Miss Abby OMG and Sederginne receive positive critiques, with Envy Peru winning the challenge. Madame Madness, Megan Schoonbrood and Patty Pam-Pam receive negative critiques, with Megan Schoonbrood being safe. Madame Madness and Patty Pam-Pam lip-sync to "Roar" by Katy Perry. Madame Madness wins the lip-sync and Patty Pam-Pam sashays away.: Guest Judge: Nikkie de Jager; Alternating Judge: Roxeanne Hazes; Mini-Challenge: Design a pair of clogs and model them; Mini-Challenge Winners: ChelseaBoy and Envy Peru; Main Challenge: Record a group workout video; Runway Theme: Give Face, Face, Face; Challenge Winner: Envy Peru; Challenge Prize: A prize package of hair products and styling tools by John Beerens, worth €1,000; Bottom Two: Madame Madness and Patty Pam-Pam; Lip-Sync Song: "Roar" by Katy Perry; Eliminated: Patty Pam-Pam; Farewell Message: "Meiden, het was me een genoegen, maar ik heb er genoeg van. Wees lief." ("Girls, it was a pleasure, but I've had enough. Be kind.")
3	3	"Drama Queens"	2 October 2020
For this week's mini-challenge, the queens will play traditional Dutch games: Koekhappen (Cow Chops), Spijkerpoepen (Pooping Nails) and Zaklopen (Bag Walking). Madame Madness and Sederginne win the mini-challenge. For the main challenge, the queens will team up and act in a drag version of the series Gooische Vrouwen.: Team Madame Madness: Janey Jacké, Madame Madness, Miss Abby OMG and Megan Schoonbrood; Team Sederginne: ChelseaBoy, Envy Peru, Ma'Ma Queen and Sederginne; On the runway, category is Miss Holland. ChelseaBoy, Ma'Ma Queen and Sederginne receive positive critiques, with Ma'Ma Queen winning the challenge. Madame Madness, Megan Schoonbrood and Miss Abby OMG receive negative critiques, with Madame Madness being safe. Megan Schoonbrood and Miss Abby OMG lip-sync to "Why Tell Me, Why" by Anita Meyer. Miss Abby OMG wins the lip-sync and Megan Schoonbrood sashays away.: Guest Judge: Rick Paul van Mulligen; Alternating Judge: Claes Iversen; Mini-Challenge: Play traditional Dutch games Koekhappen (Cow Chops), Spijkerpoepen (Pooping Nails) and Zaklopen (Bag Walking); Mini-Challenge Winners: Madame Madness and Sederginne; Main Challenge: In teams, act in a drag version of the series Gooische Vrouwen; Runway Theme: Miss Holland; Challenge Winner: Ma'Ma Queen; Challenge Prize: A prize package worth €1,000, for make up products by Schminkspecialist; Bottom Two: Megan Schoonbrood and Miss Abby OMG; Lip-Sync Song: "Why Tell Me, Why" by Anita Meyer; Eliminated: Megan Schoonbrood; Farewell Message: "Jullie zijn als echte zussen voor mij. Ik ga dit missen, maar vooral jullie. Maar! Het is een game, wees eerlijk. Kus, Megan 💋" ("You guys are like real sisters to me. I'm going to miss this, but mostly you all. But! This is a game, be truthful. Kisses, Megan. 💋")
4	4	"Dancing Queens"	9 October 2020
For this week's mini-challenge, the queens will read each other to filth. Ma'Ma Queen and Sederginne win the mini-challenge. For the main challenge, the queens will group up and perform a vogue choreographed song.: Team Ma'Ma Queen: ChelseaBoy, Miss Abby OMG and Ma'Ma Queen; Team Sederginne: Envy Peru, Janey Jacké, Madame Madness and Sederginne; On the runway, category is Shine Bright Like A Diamond. ChelseaBoy, Envy Peru and Sederginne receive positive critiques, with Envy Peru winning the challenge. Ma'Ma Queen, Madame Madness and Miss Abby OMG receive negative critiques, and are announced as the bottom three. They lip-sync to "I Wanna Dance With Somebody (Who Loves Me)" by Whitney Houston. Ma'Ma Queen and Miss Abby OMG win the lip-sync and Madame Madness sashays away.: Guest Judge: Amber Vineyard; Alternating Judge: Sanne Wallis de Vries; Mini-Challenge: Reading is Fundamental; Mini-Challenge Winners: Ma'Ma Queen and Sederginne; Main Challenge: In groups, perform a vogue choreographed song; Runway Theme: Shine Bright Like A Diamond; Challenge Winner: Envy Peru; Challenge Prize: A voucher worth €1,000, courtesy of Mister B; Bottom Three: Ma'Ma Queen, Madame Madness and Miss Abby OMG; Lip-Sync Song: "I Wanna Dance With Somebody (Who Loves Me)" by Whitney Houston; Eliminated: Madame Madness; Farewell Message: "Nou meiden, het was een harige... situatie! De ballen! (Die zijn nu ook kaal) ((Ik heb voor iedereen een briefje geschreven ♡♡)) Lots of love, Madame Madness" ("Well girls, it was a hairy... situation! See y'all! ((I wrote a note for everyone ♡♡)) Lots of love, Madame Madness")
5	5	"Snatch Game"	16 October 2020
For this weeks mini-challenge, the queens will do a naked photoshoot. Janey Jacké wins the mini challenge. For the main challenge, the queens will play the Snatch Game. Carlo Boszhard and Monica Geuze star as guest judges. The cast consisted of: ChelseaBoy as Joe Exotic; Envy Peru as Patty Brard; Janey Jacké as Anny Schilder; Ma'Ma Queen as Ryanne van Dorst; Miss Abby OMG as Michella Kox; Sederginne as Mega Mindy; On the runway, category is Half Man, Half Queen. ChelseaBoy, Envy Peru and Janey Jacké receive positive critiques, with Envy Peru winning the challenge. Ma'Ma Queen, Miss Abby OMG and Sederginne receive negative critiques, with Ma'Ma Queen being safe. Miss Abby OMG and Sederginne lip-sync to "Girl" by Anouk. Miss Abby OMG wins the lip-sync and Sederginne sashays away.: Guest Judges: Carlo Boszhard and Ruth Jacott; Mini-Challenge: Naked photoshoot; Mini-Challenge Winner: Janey Jacké; Mini-Challenge Prize: A photoshoot by Rob Jacobs; Main Challenge: Snatch Game; Runway Theme: Half Man, Half Queen; Challenge Winner: Envy Peru; Challenge Prize: A voucher worth €1,000, for SofaCompany; Bottom Two: Miss Abby OMG and Sederginne; Lip-Sync Song: "Girl" by Anouk; Eliminated: Sederginne; Farewell Message: "Wat een feest X 💋 Sederginne X" ("What a party X 💋 Sederginne X")
6	6	"It Takes Two"	23 October 2020
For this week's mini-challenge, the queens will improv for Save the Date. Ma'Ma Queen wins the mini-challenge. For the main challenge, the queens will makeover a family member or friend. On the runway, category is We Are Family. Envy Peru and Miss Abby OMG receive positive critiques, with Envy Peru winning the challenge. ChelseaBoy, Janey Jacké and Ma'Ma Queen receive negative critiques, with Ma'Ma Queen being safe. ChelseaBoy and Janey Jacké lip-sync to "9 to 5" by Dolly Parton. Janey Jacké wins the lip-sync and ChelseaBoy sashays away.: Guest Judges: Ryanne van Dorst and Loiza Lamers; Mini-Challenge: Save the Date; Mini-Challenge Winner: Ma'Ma Queen; Mini-Challenge Prize: A weekend away in Rotterdam; Main Challenge: Makeover a family member or friend; Runway Theme: We Are Family; Challenge Winner: Envy Peru; Challenge Prize: A voucher for tooth whitening therapy for two; Bottom Two: ChelseaBoy and Janey Jacké; Lip-Sync Song: "9 to 5" by Dolly Parton; Eliminated: ChelseaBoy; Farewell Message: "Lieve schatten, keep on rising to new cosmic dimensions. I'm rooting for you all. We ChelseaBoy."
7	7	"Máxima - The Rusical"	30 October 2020
For this week's mini-challenge, the queens will have a bitchfest with puppets. Envy Peru wins the mini-challenge. For the main challenge, the queens will perform in Maxima, The Rusical.: Envy Peru as The Fiancée; Janey Jacke as The Temptress; Ma'Ma Queen as The Queen; Miss Abby OMG as The Party Girl; On the runway, categories were Red (Beachwear), White (Cocktail Dress), and Blue (Evening Gown). Janey Jacké wins the challenge. Ma'Ma Queen and Miss Abby OMG receive negative critiques, and are announced as the bottom two. They are both declared the winners of the lip-sync and no one goes home.: Guest Judge: Edsilia Rombley; Alternating Judge: Roxeanne Hazes; Mini-Challenge: Everybody Loves Puppets; Mini-Challenge Winner: Envy Peru; Main Challenge: Máxima, The Rusical; Runway Themes: Red (Beachwear), White (Cocktail Dress), and Blue (Evening Gown); Challenge Winner: Janey Jacké; Challenge Prize: A voucher worth €1,000, courtesy of Nikkie; Bottom Two: Ma'Ma Queen and Miss Abby OMG; Lip-Sync Song: "Stronger" by Kelly Clarkson; Eliminated: None
8	8	"The Grand Finale"	6 November 2020
For the final challenge of the season, the queens will perform in a choreographed lip-sync medley to RuPaul songs. On the runway, the eliminated queens and the finalists present their Best Drag. Ma'Ma Queen and Miss Abby OMG are eliminated, leaving Envy Peru and Janey Jacké as the top two queens of the season. They lip-sync to "Born This Way" by Lady Gaga. It is announced that Envy Peru is the winner, leaving Janey Jacké as the runner-up.: Guest Judge: Nikkie de Jager; Alternating Judges: Sanne Wallis de Vries and Claes Iversen; Main Challenge: Perform in a choreographed lip-sync medley to RuPaul songs; Runway Theme: Best Drag; Eliminated: Ma'Ma Queen and Miss Abby OMG; Top Two: Envy Peru and Janey Jacké; Lip-Sync Song: "Born This Way" by Lady Gaga; Runner-up: Janey Jacké; Winner of Drag Race Holland: Envy Peru
