= List of Drag Race Holland episodes =

Drag Race Holland is a Dutch reality competition streaming television series, based on the American RuPaul's Drag Race. The series is produced by Vincent TV and World of Wonder. The show premiered on Videoland in the Netherlands and on WOW Presents Plus internationally on 18 September 2020. The show documents Fred van Leer in his search for the "next Dutch drag superstar". The series was renewed for a second season in 2021, and the second season began airing on 6 August 2021.

== Series overview ==
Series	Episodes	Originally released	
Series	Episodes	First released	Last released
1	8	18 September 2020	6 November 2020
2	8	6 August 2021	24 September 2021

== Episodes ==
=== Season 1 (2020) ===
No. overall	No. in season	Title	Original release date
1	1	"Land of the Queens"	18 September 2020
2	2	"Give Face!"	25 September 2020
3	3	"Drama Queens"	2 October 2020
4	4	"Dancing Queens"	9 October 2020
5	5	"Snatch Game"	16 October 2020
6	6	"It Takes Two"	23 October 2020
7	7	"Máxima - The Rusical"	30 October 2020
8	8	"The Grand Finale"	6 November 2020

=== Season 2 (2021) ===
No. overall	No. in season	Title	Original release date
9	1	"Who's That Queen?"	6 August 2021
10	2	"Ooh, I Got Sunburned!"	13 August 2021
11	3	"Icons Only (Snatch Game)"	20 August 2021
12	4	"Cinderella in Mokum"	27 August 2021
13	5	"Dearly Beloved (Family Resemblance)"	3 September 2021
14	6	"Spill the Coffee"	10 September 2021
15	7	"Whodunnit"	17 September 2021
16	8	"Finale"	24 September 2021
