= Keta Minaj =

Dutch drag performer

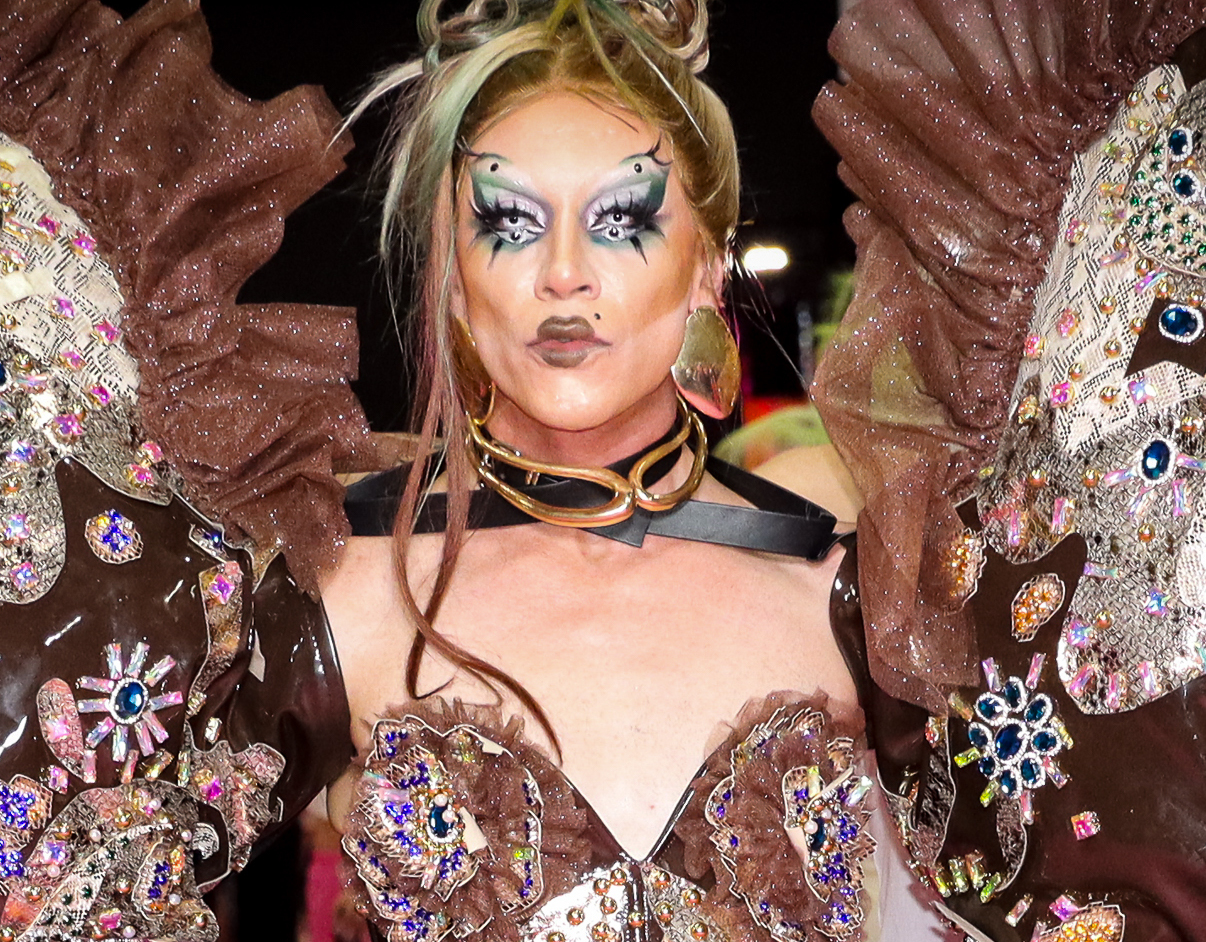
- Minaj at RuPaul's DragCon LA, 2024
- Born: Bobby Snijder
- Occupation: Drag queen
- Television: Drag Race Holland (season 2); RuPaul's Drag Race: UK vs. the World (series 2)
- Website: ketaminaj.com

Keta Minaj is the stage name of Bobby Snijder, a Dutch drag performer who competed on the second season of Drag Race Holland (2021), and in the second series of RuPaul's Drag Race: UK vs. the World (2024).

== Filmography ==
Year	Title	Role	Notes
2021	Drag Race Holland	Contestant	Season 2, 8 episodes
2024	RuPaul's Drag Race: UK vs. the World	Contestant	Series 2, 5 episodes

- Bring Back My Girls (2024)
