= Janey Jacké =

Dutch drag queen

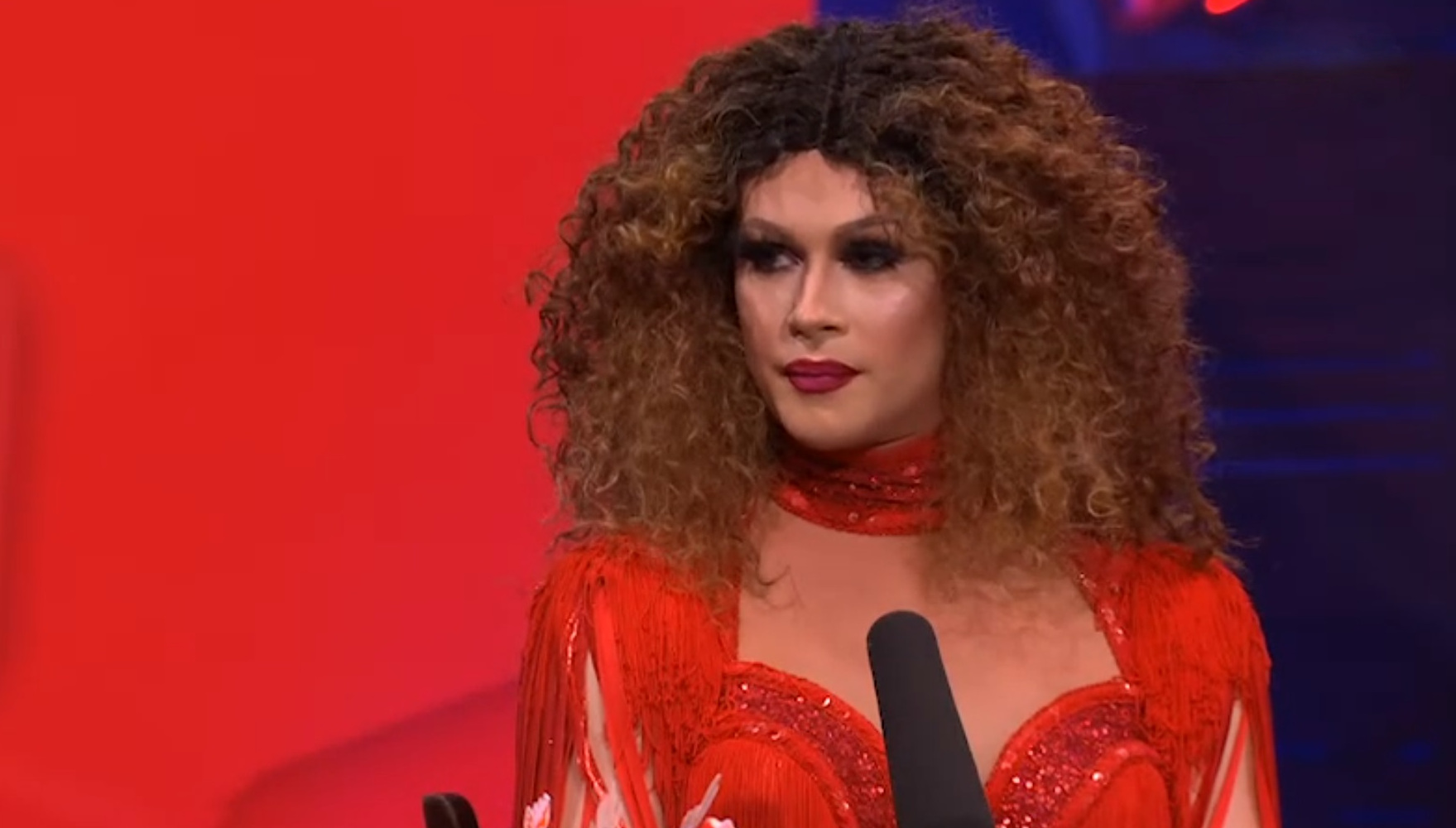
- Jacké in 2020
- Born: Justin Omar Mooijer; 9 April 1992 (age 33); Purmerend, Netherlands
- Occupations: Drag queen; actor; presenter
- Years active: 2017–present
- Television: Drag Race Holland (season 1); RuPaul's Drag Race: UK vs. the World (series 1)
- Website: janeyjacke.com

Justin Omar Mooijer (born 9 April 1992), known by the stage name Janey Jacké, is a Dutch drag queen, actor and presenter, most known for competing in the first season of Drag Race Holland (2020) and later the first series of RuPaul's Drag Race: UK vs. the World (2022).

== Career ==
At age 16, Mooijer dressed up as a woman for the first time during a classmate's birthday party.

In 2012, Mooijer completed his education at the Da Costa hotel school, for which he did internships at various hotels. After five years of working at Michelin restaurants and five-star hotels, he started a professional career as Janey Jacké.

On 9 September 2020, Janey Jacké was announced as one of ten cast members of the debut season of Drag Race Holland. Jacké made it to the finals and became runner-up.

On 17 January 2022, Janey Jacké was announced as one of the nine contestants on the first series of RuPaul's Drag Race: UK vs. the World, ultimately coming in fifth place.

== Personal life ==
Mooijer was born in Purmerend and grew up in Volendam. He is now based in Amsterdam.

== Discography ==
=== Singles ===
==== As lead artist ====
| Title | Year | Album |
|---|---|---|
| "Turned Heads" (featuring Lady Bee) | 2022 | Non-album singles |

==== As featured artist ====
| Title | Year | Album |
|---|---|---|
| "Living My Life in London (Cast Version)" (RuPaul featuring the cast of RuPaul's Drag Race UK vs The World) | 2022 | Non-album single |

== Filmography ==
=== Television ===
| Year | Title | Role | Notes | Ref. |
|---|---|---|---|---|
| 2019 | All Together Now | Himself | Judge | |
| 2020 | Cultuur in Actie! | Himself | Guest | |
| 2020 | Drag Race Holland | Himself | Runner-up; Season 1 | |
| 2020 | Jinek | Himself | Guest | |
| 2022 | RuPaul's Drag Race: UK vs. the World | Himself | 5th place Series 1 | |
| 2024 | Wie is de Mol? | Himself | 8th place | |

=== Film ===
| Year | Title | Role | Notes | Ref. |
|---|---|---|---|---|
| 2013 | Chez Nous (2013) | Drag queen | | |
| 2018 | Gewoon Vrienden | Friend Yad | | |

=== Music videos ===
| Year | Artist | Title |
|---|---|---|
| 2020 | Sederginne | Girls Just Wanna Have Fun! |

=== Web series ===
| Year | Title | Role | Notes | Ref. |
|---|---|---|---|---|
| 2020 | Dook duikt in | Himself (in drag) | Guest, 1 episode | |
| 2022 | Bring Back My Girls | Herself | Guest | |
