= Josha Stradowski =

Dutch actor

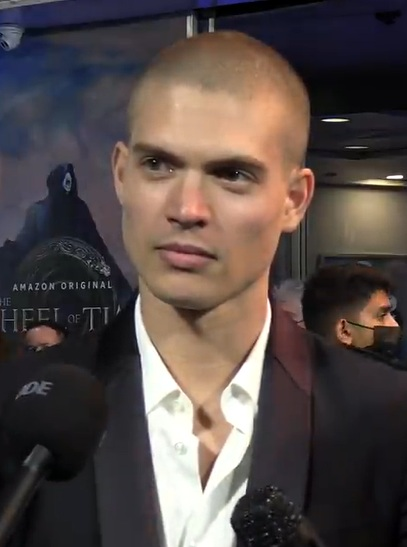
- Stradowski at The Wheel of Time London Premiere 2021
- Born: 7 August 1995 (age 31); Rotterdam, Netherlands
- Occupation: Actor
- Years active: 2011–present

Josha Stradowski (Dutch: [jˈə͡ʊʃə stɹadˈɒvskɪ]; born 7 August 1995) is a Dutch actor. He is known for portraying Rand al'Thor in the Amazon Prime Video fantasy series The Wheel of Time from 2021 to 2025, and racing car driver Nicholas Capa in the 2023 film Gran Turismo.

== Career ==
Stradowski was born on 7 August 1995 and is of Dutch and Polish descent. He began acting in 2006 in local theater productions of Kuifje: De Zonnetempel, Ciske de Rat, and The Sound of Music. He made his screen debut as one of the lead characters in a youth series titled Naranjina en de Kadekapers. Beginning in 2011 he played a recurring role in the Dutch youth series SpangaS, while also guest starring in a 2012 episode of Verborgen Verhalen. He also appeared in productions such as Gender and Bromance with the Oostpool Theater Group, and in Oedipus at the International Theater Amsterdam.

In 2018, he graduated from the AHK Theatre School in Amsterdam with a bachelor's degree in acting. That same year he starred in the Dutch-language film Just Friends as Joris. The film won the 2018 People's Choice Award at the Perth International Queer Film Festival and the 2018 Audience Choice Award at the OUT at the Movies International LGBT film fest.

In August 2019, Stradowski was cast as Rand al'Thor in the Amazon Prime Video series The Wheel of Time based on the fantasy book series of the same name by Robert Jordan and Brandon Sanderson. Owen Danoff of Screen Rant wrote that Stradowski was able to "blend smart acting choices with a firsthand knowledge of Robert Jordan’s source material to give the character the layers and depth he requires."

In 2020 Stradowski appeared as one of three main characters in the Dutch-language series High Flyers, which was billed as the "Dutch Top Gun". The following year he was signed to the talent management agency Range Media Partners.

In 2023, Stradowski appeared in Gran Turismo, a film based on the PlayStation racing simulation video game series of the same name, as antagonist Nicholas Capa. S.K. Sapiano of Collider wrote that "Capa is an effective villain, brought to life by Stradowski's intensity and steely gaze."

== Filmography ==
=== Film ===
Year	Title	Role	Notes
2018	Mannen van Mars	Difficult Boy #2	
2019	Instinct	Man	
2023	Gran Turismo	Nicholas Capa	

=== Television ===
Year	Title	Role	Notes
2011	Naranjina en de kadekapers	Freddie	
2011–2012	SpangaS	Pascal Roozen	27 episodes
2012	Verborgen Verhalen	Wil	1 episode
2018	Just Friends	Joris	TV Movie
2020	High Flyers	Rutger de Man	Main cast (8 episodes)
2021–2025	The Wheel of Time	Rand al'Thor	Main cast
