= Just Friends (2018 film) =

2018 television film directed by Ellen Smit

- Promotional poster
- Dutch: Gewoon Vrienden
- Written by: Henk Burger
- Directed by: Ellen Smit
- Starring: Majd Mardo; Josha Stradowski; Jenny Arean; Tanja Jess
- Composer: Rob Peters
- Country of origin: Netherlands
- Original language: Dutch

Production
- Producers: Marijn Wigman; Denis Wigman; Roen Kiewik
- Cinematography: Tjitte Jan Nieuwkoop
- Editor: Godelinde Pollmann
- Running time: 80 minutes
- Production company: CTM Films

Original release
- Network: BNNVARA
- Release: 7 March 2018

Just Friends (Dutch: Gewoon Vrienden) is a 2018 Dutch romantic comedy television film directed by Ellen Smit, starring Majd Mardo and Josha Stradowski. The film was shown on opening night of the Perth International Queer Film Festival and won the Audience Award after showing at the MIX Milano International Lesbian and Gay Film Festival. It premiered on BNNVARA on 7 March 2018.

== Synopsis ==
Joris is a 21-year-old nouveau riche Dutch man trying to come to terms with loss of his father 10 years earlier. His strong-willed, conservative, Islamophobic and racist mother is no help. Simone is caught up in her own emotions over her philandering late husband. Meanwhile, Yad, a 26-year-old Syrian refugee whose family settled in the Netherlands is employed to do chores for Joris' grandmother Ans. He has returned from Amsterdam after "Amsterdam was too fun. My studies too boring" to live with his family "temporarily". Yad has his own issues with his traditional upbringing and his dream to be a surfing instructor. Running his own business goes against the expectation that he continue his studies in medicine.

Despite different ages, backgrounds, and lifestyles there is an instant spark between the two. Drawn together through music and sports, mainly surfing, their feelings for each other grow, and they become more than "just friends".

Their mothers, Simone and Maryam, threaten to jeopardize their relationship. Due to the pressure Yad and Joris have a falling-out. Things turn better after; their mothers realize "you do not control love, love controls you", Joris reconciles with the loss of his father, and Yad finds the courage to embrace what he loves.

== Cast ==
- Majd Mardo as Yad
- Josha Stradowski as Joris
  - Stan Gobel as young Joris
- Jenny Arean as Ans
- Tanja Jess as Simone
- Melody Klaver as Moon
  - Renske Hettinga as young Moon
- Mohamad Alahmad as Elias
- Nazmiye Oral as Maryam
- Elène Zuidmeer as Fientje
- Roscoe Leijen as Gerlof
- Sjoerd Dragtsma as Mitch
- Younes Badrane as Trainer
- Anne Prakke as Bart
- Sonia Eijken as Lely
- Malcolm Hugo Glenn as Erwin
- Tessa du Mee as Crematory clerk
- Justin Mooijer as Yad's friend
