= Jenny Arean =

Dutch singer, actress and comedian

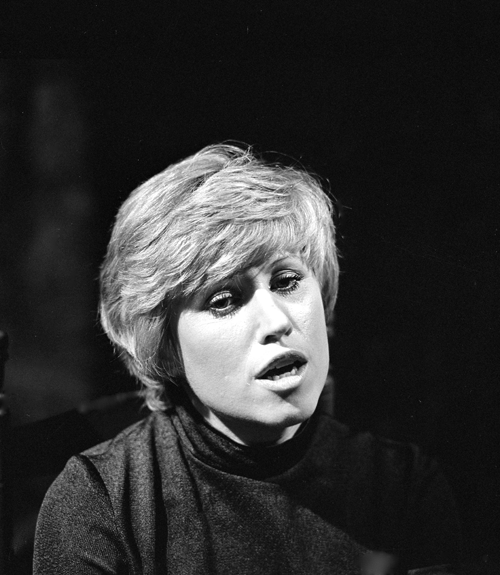
Jenny Arean in 1973

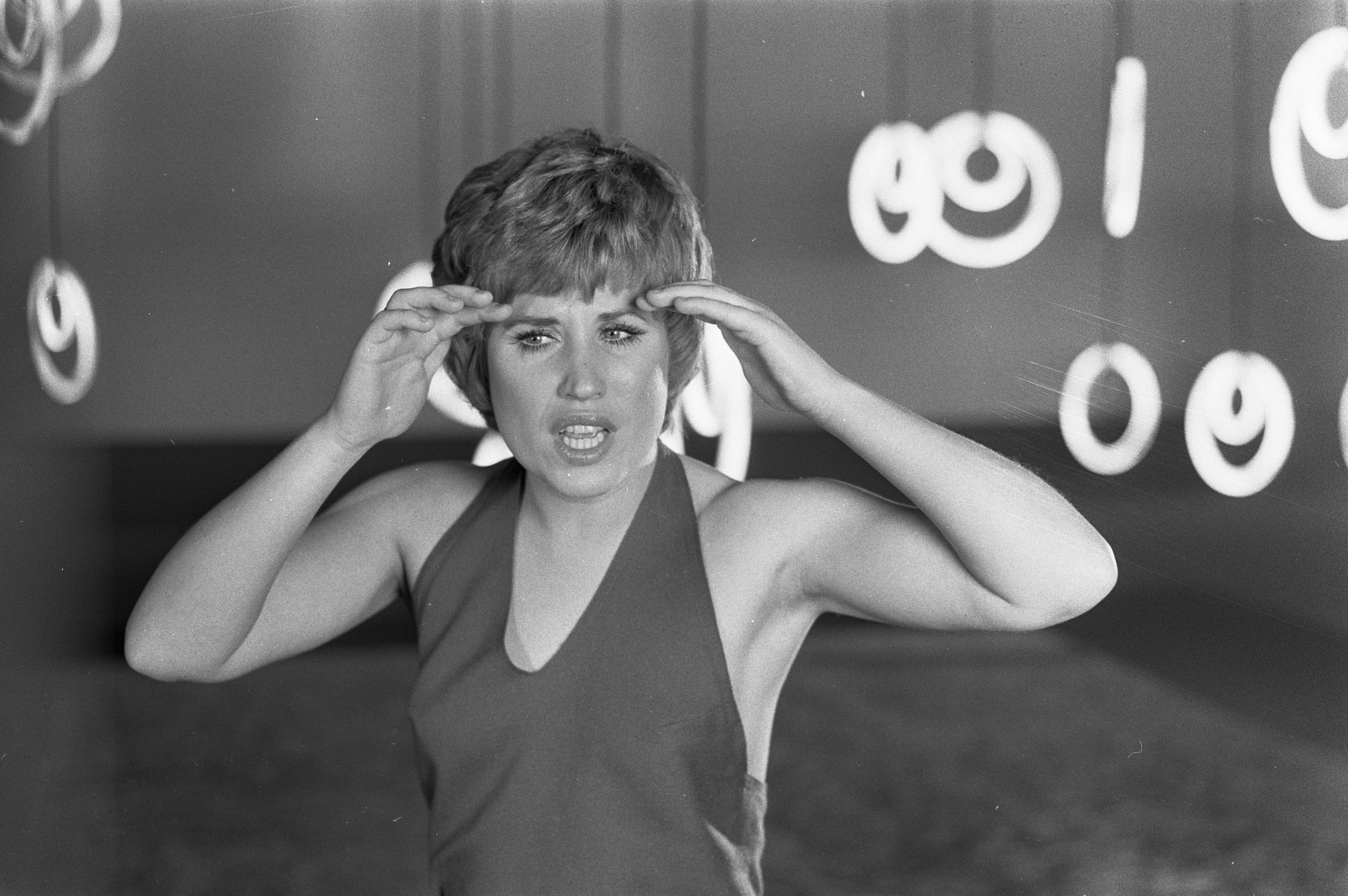
Jenny Arean (1972)

Jenny Arean (born Joanna Jenneke Josepha Klarenbeek, 4 October 1942) is a Dutch singer, actress and comedian. She is known for her contralto voice.

== Life and career ==
Arean was born in Lisse and raised in Amsterdam. Her father was a waiter and her mother was the singer Conny Renoir. Her mother's mother was also a singer, Henny Verra.

When Arean was 14 years old she saw a performance by the Dutch comedian Wim Sonneveld. At that moment she knew where she wanted to be: on stage. Her mother reckoned her too young for that and at the age of 15 Arean quit school and became a housekeeper. In 1960 she got employment at the ABC-cabaret, managed by Wim Kan] and his wife Corry Vonk. Vonk suggested she change her name to Jenny Arean.

In the late 1960s Arean played in plays, musicals (En nu naar bed by Annie M.G. Schmidt) and television series. From 1963 till 1973 she was married to the Dutch actor Huib Rooymans. They had one daughter, Myra, and divorced because Arean had an affair with her colleague Frans Halsema. In 1977 Arean and Halsema had a big hit with the song Vluchten kan niet meer. In the early 1980s Arean had a relationship with the Dutch journalist and writer Ischa Meijer. Together they played four productions all written by Meijer. He also stimulated her to play solo productions. In 1985 she played the first one in a long sequence: Gescheiden vrouw op oorlogspad. With that she won several awards, among them the Johan Kaart Prize and the Scheveningen Cabaret Prize. In 2018 she received a Knighthood in the Order of the Dutch Lion.

== Solo productions ==
- Gescheiden vrouw op oorlogspad (1985)
- Voort gaat i.e. weer (1986)
- Het Huishoudschoolsyndroom (1991)
- De dame zet zich schrap (1992)
- Alles heeft zijn prijs (1994)
- Voorwaarts en niet vergeten (2000)
- Jenny solo (2005)
- Jenny Arean in concert (2007)

== Theatre/musical ==
- Hooikoorts (1965/1966) (by Noël Coward)
- En nu naar bed (1971)
- En God Zag Dat Het Goed Was (1983) (with Ischa Meijer)
- Neem je een apie voor me mee (1988) (with George Groot)
- Tip Top (1995/1996)
- Heerlijk duurt het langst (1998)
- Chicago (1999)
- Foxtrot (2001)
- Klarenbeek and Verbrugge (2002) (with Willeke Alberti)
- Telkens weer het dorp (2004)
- De Jantjes (2005)
- Het Verschil (2007)
- New Grounds (2009) (with Tango Dorado)
- Jenny Arean and Louis van Dijk (2009)

== Film and television ==
- Het meisje met de blauwe hoed (1972/2004)
- 't Schaep met de 5 pooten (2006)
- 't Vrije Schaep (met de 5 pooten) (2009)
- 't Spaanse Schaep (2010)
- Gewoon Vrienden, English title Just Friends (2018)
