= Sederginne =

Belgian drag performer

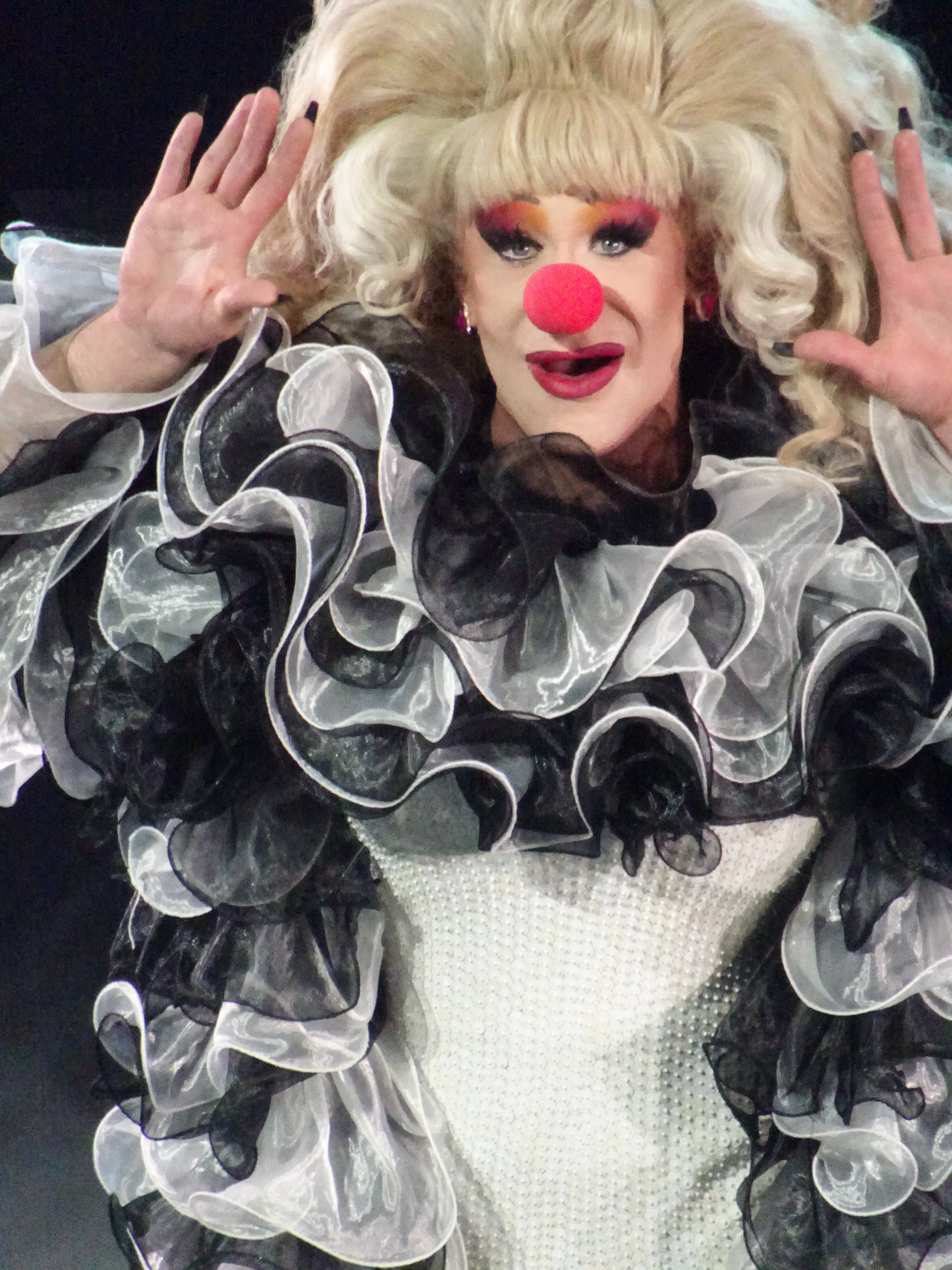
- Sederginne performs Send In the Clowns, 2024
- Born: Serge Quik; Deurne, Belgium
- Occupation: Drag queen
- Television: Drag Race Holland (season 1)
- Website: sederginne.com

Serge Quik, known by the stage name Sederginne, is a Belgian drag performer who competed on the first season of Drag Race Holland.

Quik has been performing as a drag queen since the age of 15. Originally his stage name was Serge La Femme, but it was changed when his colleagues started calling him Sederginne, after a Belgian effervescent tablet for headaches. Starting in 2014, Sederginne presented four seasons of shows at the gay hotel Elysium in Mykonos. In 2017, Sederginne played in the Flemish musical La Cage aux Folles.

== Filmography ==
=== Television ===
Year	Title	Role	Notes
2020	Drag Race Holland (season 1)	Himself	Contestant, 6th Place
2021	Drag Race Holland (season 2)	Himself	Guest, 1 episode

=== Web series ===
Year	Title	Role	Notes	Ref
2021	Review Met Sederginne	Himself	Host	

- Bring Back My Girls (2022)

== Gallery ==
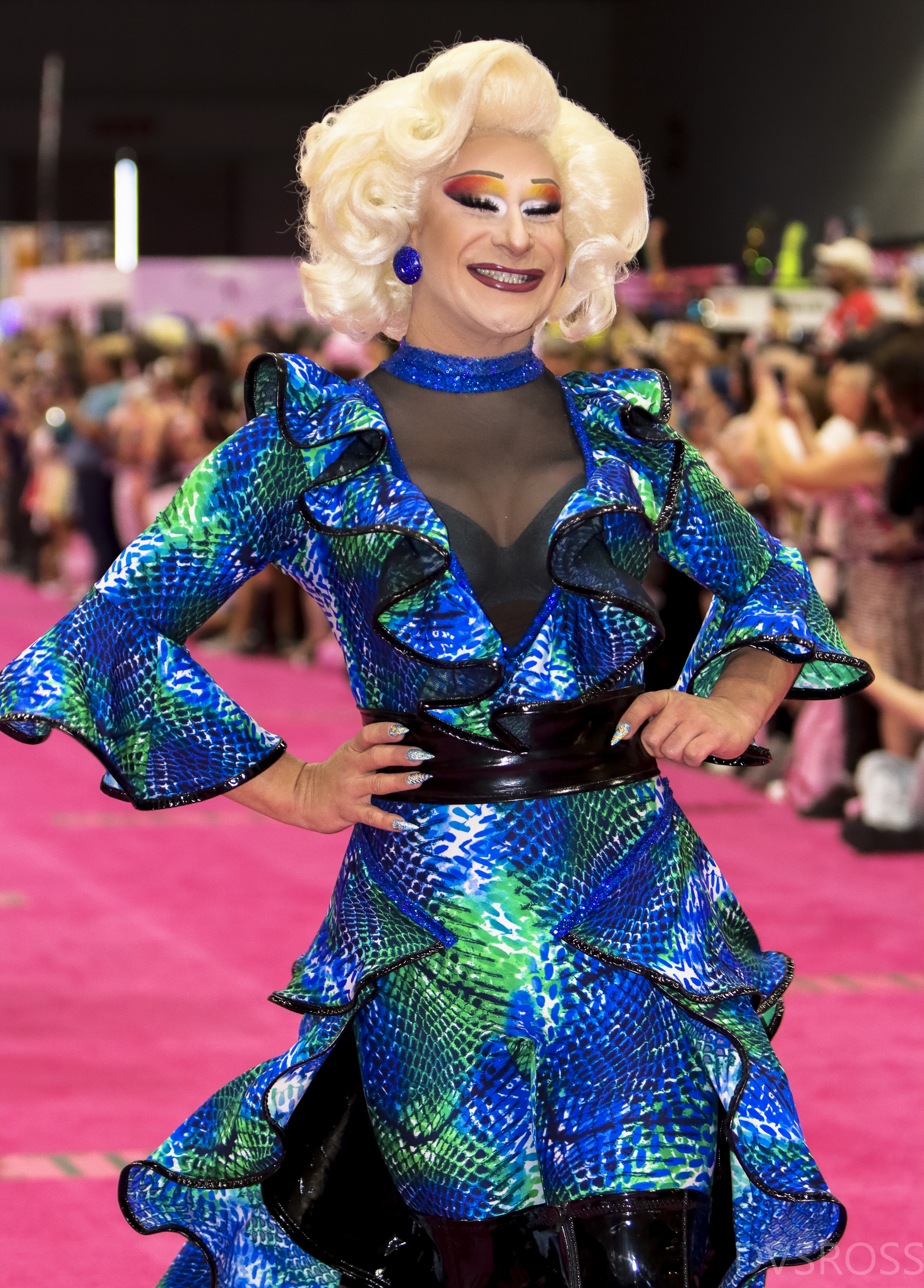
Sederginne at RuPaul's DragCon LA, 2022

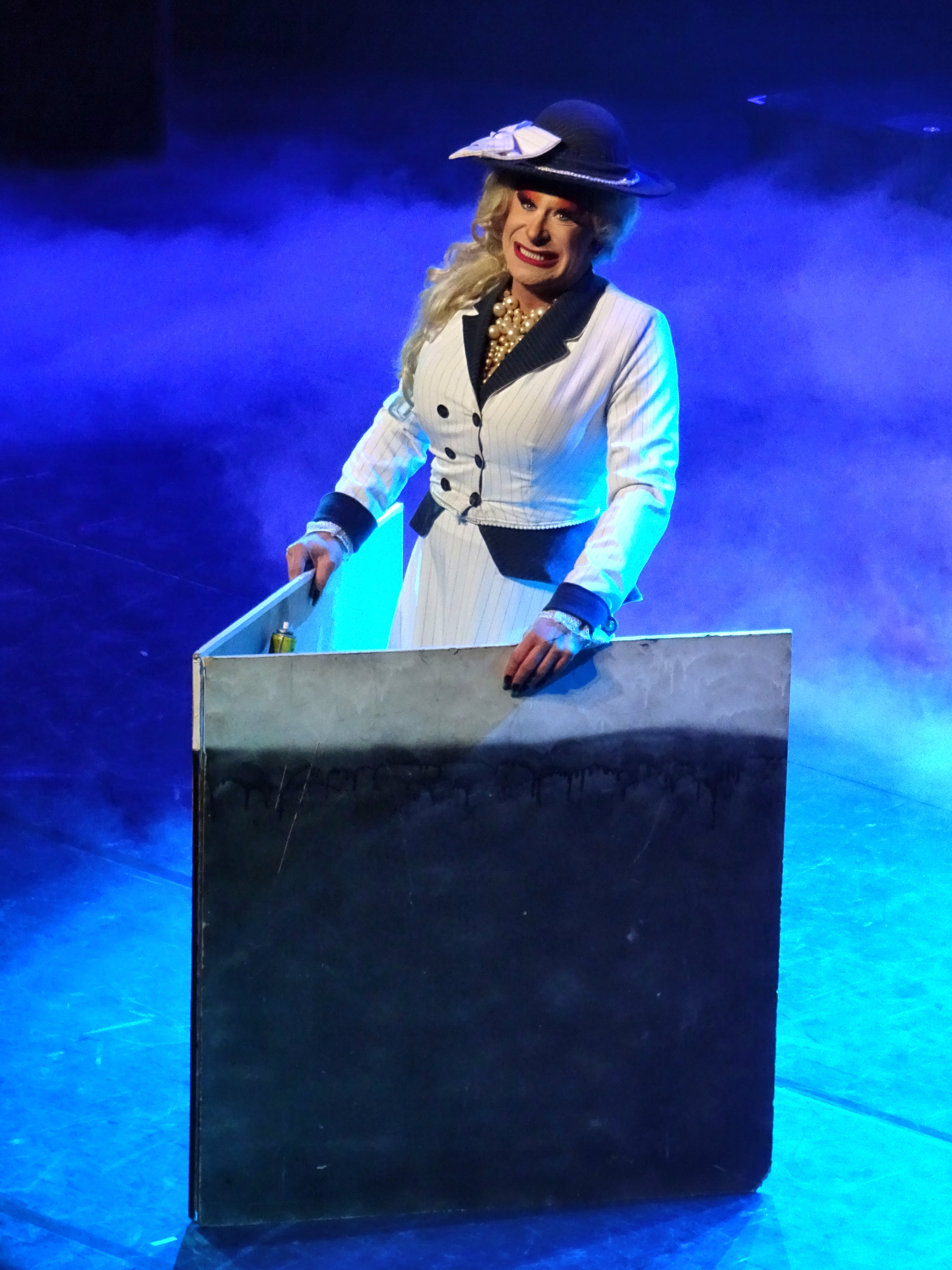
Sederginne performs a Titanic scene, 2024
