= Vanessa Van Cartier =

Drag performer

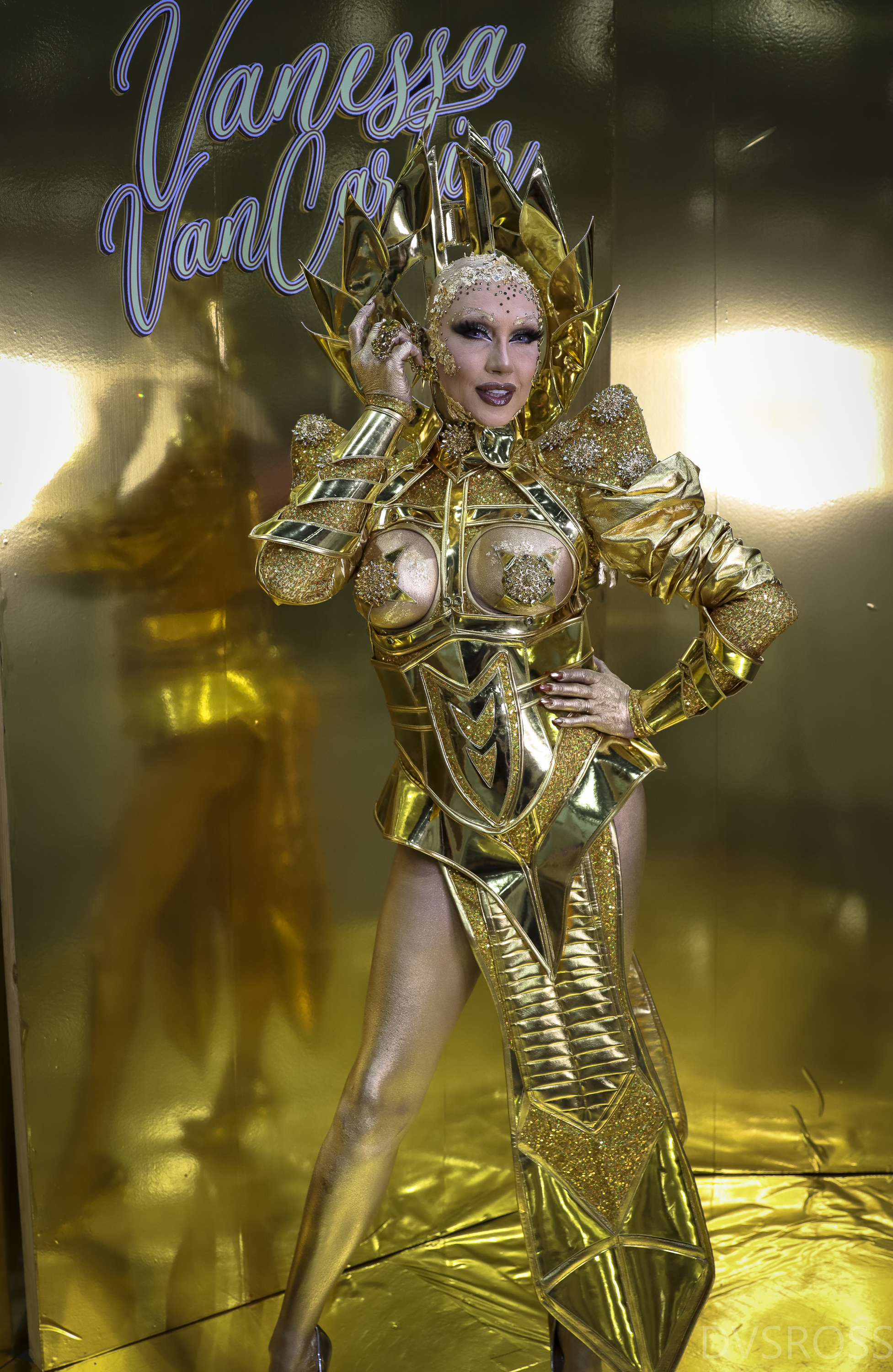
- Vanessa Van Cartier at RuPaul's DragCon LA, 2022
- Born: 3 December 1979 (age 46); Zele, Flanders, Belgium
- Other name: Vanessa Crokaert
- Citizenship: Belgium
- Television: Drag Race Holland (season 2)

Vanessa Crokaert (born 3 December 1979) better known by the stage name Vanessa Van Cartier is a Belgian-Dutch drag queen based in Rotterdam, The Netherlands. She is best known for winning the second season of Drag Race Holland. She became the franchise's third trans woman to win. Previously, she was named Miss Continental 2019 and reigned until 2021. She is the first Queen to be crowned “Miss Continental” prior to winning a season of RuPaul’s Drag Race.

Vanessa Van Cartier is the "drag mother" of season 1 winner Envy Peru. In 2021, Entertainment Weekly's Joey Nolfi described her as "a trans trailblazer who broke barriers" for her representation at Miss Continental.

== Television ==
Year	Title	Role	Notes
2021	Drag Race Holland (season 2)	Herself	Contestant (Winner)
2022-present	Make Up Your Mind	Herself	Original Dutch version: Judge, season 2-present
2022	Bring Back My Girls	Herself	One episode
2023	Drag Race Belgique	Herself	Guest judge; Episode: "Grande Finale" season 1
2023	Make Up Your Mind	Herself	Flemish version: Judge, season 1-present
2023	What a Drag	Herself	Documentary
2023	Non Sono Una Signora	Herself	Coach

== Discography ==
=== As featured artist ===
Title	Year
"Vieren (Cast Version)" (Famke Louise featuring The Cast of Drag Race Holland, Season 2 (Note: The queens on this track from the cast include Vanessa Van Cartier, My Little Puny and Vivaldi.))	2021
