= Envy Peru =

Dutch drag queen (born 1989)

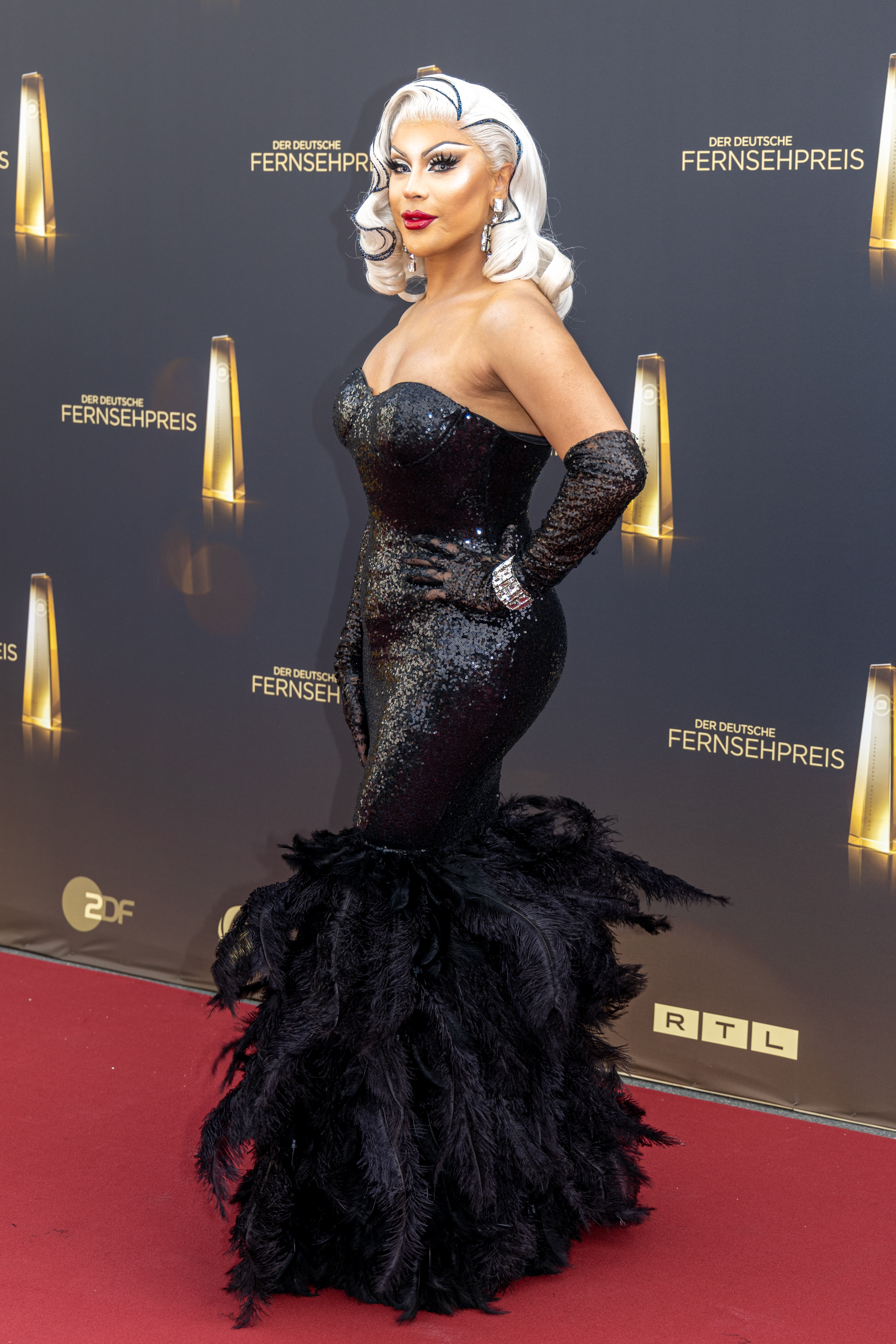
- Envy Peru in 2022
- Born: Boris Itzkovich Escobar; 22 April 1989 (age 37); Trujillo, Peru
- Occupations: Drag queen; model; actor; makeup artist
- Years active: 2019–present
- Television: Drag Race Holland (season 1)
- Successor: Vanessa Van Cartier
- Website: envyperu.com

Boris Itzkovich Escobar (born 22 April 1989), known by the stage name Envy Peru, is a Peruvian and Dutch drag queen, actor, model and makeup artist known for winning the first season of Drag Race Holland. Envy Peru is also known as a presenter for the BNNVARA television show De diva in mij.

== Early life ==
Boris Itzkovich Escobar was born in Trujillo, Peru, in 1989. At the age of four, they moved with their mother and aunt to the Netherlands, where they began working in the world of theater and makeup. She is the drag daughter of Vanessa Van Cartier and Tabitha.

== Career ==
In September 2020, Envy Peru was announced as one of ten cast members of the debut season of Drag Race Holland. Envy was the first-ever Peruvian contestant in the Drag Race franchise, and went on to win the season. Her track record was one of the best in the history of the show at the time of airing, with 4 challenge wins out of the 7 competitive episodes.

In July 2021, she was a featured guest judge for Drag Race España, becoming the first Drag Race contestant to act as a guest judge.

In July 2023, she revealed that she had recently been physically and verbally assaulted by four young men while riding a bus in Amsterdam. The same month, she announced that her U.S. visa had been approved.

As Envy Peru, she is the most-followed drag queen on social media in the Netherlands.

== Filmography ==
=== Television ===
Year	Title	Role	Notes
2019	De diva in mij	Herself	Presenter, 8 episodes
2020	Betreden op eigen risico	Herself	
2020	Drag Race Holland (season 1)	Herself	Winner
2020	Lieve Frogers	Herself	Episode 1
2021-2023	Make Up Your Mind	Herself (Head Chairwoman)	3 seasons
2021	Drag Race España (season 1)	Herself (Guest judge)	1 episode
2021	Drag Race Holland (season 2)	Herself (Special guest/guest judge)	2 episodes
2021	De Verraders	Herself (Contestant)	3 episodes
2021	Ranking the Stars	Herself (Guest)	1 episode
2026	Drag Race México: Latina Royale	Herself (Guest judge)	1 episode

- Bring Back My Girls (2022)
- Hey Qween! (2024)

=== Film ===
Year	Title	Role	Notes
2019	Cuban Love	Drag queen	Dutch film
2019	Wat je vind mag je houden	Lady LaBelle	

=== Music videos ===
Year	Artist	Title
2019	Mermaids Mansion	Love is Love
2019	Willie Wartaal	Daia
2020	Steff da Campo	Saving Your Soul

=== Webseries ===
Year	Title	Role	Notes	Ref
2019	The Gay Explorer	Herself	Season 2, episode 6	
2019	NikkieTutorials	Herself	Winter Wonder Week	
2019	Spuiten en Slikken	Herself		
2020	The Chop	Herself	Guest	
2021	Bootleg Opinions	Herself	Guest	
2021	Review Met Sederginne	Herself	Guest	
2021	Exposed	Herself	Guest	
2022	Bring Back My Girls	Herself	Episode: "Drag Race Holland 1 & 2"	
2024	Give It To Me Straight	Herself	Episode 41	
