= Denzel Slager =

Dutch-born Curaçaoan footballer

Personal information
- Full name: Denzel Slager
- Date of birth: 2 February 1993 (age 33)
- Place of birth: Amsterdam, Netherlands
- Height: 1.85 m (6 ft 1 in)
- Positions: Forward; winger

Youth career
- 2011–2012: FC Utrecht

Senior career*
Years	Team	Apps	(Gls)
2012–2014	RKC Waalwijk	14	(1)
2014	Coventry City	3	(0)
2015	Orange County Blues	21	(6)
2016	LA Galaxy II	19	(1)
Total		57	(8)

International career
2013	Curaçao U20		
- * Club domestic league appearances and goals

Denzel Slager (born 2 February 1993) is a Dutch-Curaçao former footballer who plays as a forward.

== Career ==
=== RKC Waalwijk ===
Slager started his football career at RKC Waalwijk and signed his first professional contract with the club, keeping him until 2014. In his first season at the club Slager made five appearances for RKC Waalwijk.

In the first half of the season, Slager made nine appearances for the club, including scoring his first goal against Go Ahead Eagles on 31 August 2013.

=== Coventry City ===
On 3 January 2014, Denzel agreed an 18-month deal which would keep him with the Sky Blues until the summer of 2015. He started his first match for the Sky Blues against Barnsley in the third round of the FA Cup on 4 January 2014, which was won 2–1.

On 18 February 2014 Slager had his contract cancelled by mutual consent.

=== Orange County Blues ===
Slager signed with third-tier US club Orange County Blues on 27 March 2015. Slager went on trial at SC Cambuur, but was unsuccessful of getting himself a contract.

=== LA Galaxy II ===
Slager joined United Soccer League side LA Galaxy II on 18 February 2016. He was released at the end of the 2016 season.

== Career statistics ==
As of 1 February 2014

Club	Season	League			FA Cup		League Cup		Other^{[A]}		Total	
Club	Season	Division	Apps	Goals	Apps	Goals	Apps	Goals	Apps	Goals	Apps	Goals
RKC Waalwijk	2012–13	Eredivise	5	0	0	0	0	0	0	0	5	0
RKC Waalwijk	2013–14	Eredivise	9	1	0	0	0	0	0	0	9	1
Total			14	1	0	0	0	0	0	0	14	1
Coventry City	2013–14	League One	3	0	1	0	0	0	0	0	4	0
Total			3	0	1	0	0	0	0	0	4	0
Orange County Blues	2015	USL	6	2	0	0	0	0	0	0	6	2
Total			6	2	0	0	0	0	0	0	6	2
Career totals			23	3	1	0	0	0	0	0	24	3

== International ==
In 2013, Denzel was part of the Curaçao under-20 side for the 2013 CONCACAF U-20 Championship

== Personal ==
On 10 August 2021 Slager confirmed his relation with singer Famke Louise after they appeared together on the cover of the Dutch Cosmopolitan. On January 9, 2022, Meijer gave birth to their first child, a son.
