= Famke Louise =

Dutch vlogger, model and singer

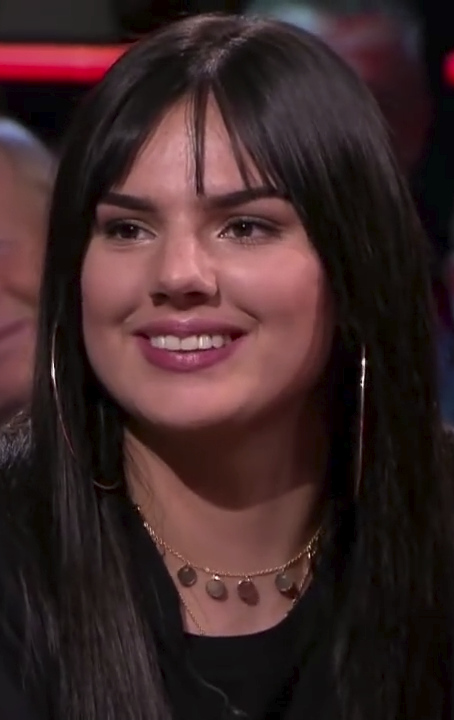
- Famke Louise at De Wereld Draait Door in 2018

Background information
- Born: Famke Jantina Louise Meijer; 9 December 1998 (age 27); Amsterdam, Netherlands
- Origin: Almere, Netherlands
- Genres: Pop; R&B; Hip hop; Nederhop
- Occupations: YouTuber; model; singer
- Instrument: Vocals
- Years active: 2016–present
- Website: www.famkelouise.nl

Famke Jantina Louise Meijer (pronounced [ˈfɛmkə jɑnˈtinaː luˈʋiːzə ˈmɛiər]; born 9 December 1998), better known as Famke Louise, is a Dutch YouTuber, model and singer from Amsterdam. She took part in the 19th season of the Dutch television series Expeditie Robinson.

== Life and career ==
Meijer was born in Amsterdam in the Netherlands. In February 2016, Meijer started her own YouTube channel under her nickname Famke Louise. After she became known, she began using Famke Louise as her stage name. At first Meijer made prank videos with several friends; several of her videos were criticized for being fake. Because of this criticism Meijer decided to delete all her previous videos. She then began making videos about beauty, fashion and started vlogging. In 2017 she appeared in the Dutch television series Models in Paris: Het Echte Leven, where she was guided into the life of modelling; after the series ended, Meijer took part in photo-shoots with various Dutch magazines.

At the end of 2017, Meijer started working on her singing career. In November 2017 she released the single "Op Me Monnie", (Dutch/Surinamese mixed slang for: "I'm on my Paper/ On my money") which received attention from national media in The Netherlands several times. After this Meijer released the singles "Vroom" and "Lit". In March 2018, she released the single "Fan" in collaboration with rapper Ronnie Flex. The single achieved one million streams within one day and reached first place on the Dutch Single Top 100 chart. Meijer then released various singles like "Evoluatie", "High", "Slangen"(Snakes) and "Zonder Jou".(Without You) In June 2018, Meijer released the single "Wine Slow (Remix)" in collaboration with the Dutch rappers Ronnie Flex, Idaly and Bizzey. Rapper Bizzey was also Meijer's manager from end 2017 until November 2018, he helped her with the start of her career.

Meijer appeared on the 19th season of the Dutch television series Expeditie Robinson in September 2018 and in StukTV's Het Jachtseizoen in November 2018. In November Meijer got her own documentary series on Videoland, which premiered at the Tuschinski cinema in Amsterdam. Since the end of 2018, Meijer has been signed to the Dutch Record label SPEC by Ali B. and Breghje Kommers.

In June 2019, Meijer won a FunX Music Award in the category Artist of the Year – Female; she was the first to win the Award in that category. In 2019 Meijer was guest jury member in Holland's Next Top Model and she appeared on Ik hou van Holland.

In 2020 she made a documentary called Bont Girl (translated as Fur Girl) in which she exposed the Chinese fur industry. That same year she appeared as Monkey in the Dutch television series The Masked Singer. In November 2020 Meijer released her debut album NEXT.

She faced criticism in September 2020 after she uploaded a video where she said she would no longer be following COVID-19 restrictions. She later removed the video and issued an apology.

== Personal ==
Meijer dated rapper Ronnie Flex from mid-2018 to early-2019; they confirmed this in their Christmas song "Alleen door jou".

On 10 August 2021 Meijer confirmed her relation with former professional footballer Denzel Slager after they appeared together on the cover of the Dutch Cosmopolitan. On 9 January 2022, Meijer gave birth to their first child, a son.

== Discography ==
=== Albums ===
Year	Title	NL 100	
Year	Title	Peak	Weeks
2020	"NEXT"	64	1

=== Singles ===
Year	Title	NL 100		Certifications
Year	Title	Peak	Weeks	Certifications
2017	"Op Me Monnie"	3	10	NVPI: Gold
2017	"Vroom" (featuring Bokoesam)	7	4	
2018	"Lit" (featuring LouiVos)	16	2	
2018	"Fan" (featuring Ronnie Flex)	1	15	NVPI: Platinum
2018	"High"	29	2	
2018	"Evoluatie" (featuring Bokoesam)	52	1	
2018	"Zonder Jou"	Tip 9	2	
2018	"Slangen"	23	2	
2018	"Wine Slow (Remix)" (featuring Ronnie Flex, Idaly and Bizzey)	3	35	NVPI: Platinum
2018	"Ben Je Down?" (featuring Jayh & Badd Dimes)	20	8	
2018	"Slide" (featuring Caza)	6	26	NVPI: Platinum
2018	"Alleen door jou" (featuring Ronnie Flex)	3	5	
2019	"Derrière"	8	5	
2019	"Boing Boing" (featuring Lauwtje & Poke)	21	6	
2019	"Alleen jou" (featuring Idaly)	55	3	
2019	"Boss Bitch"	36	4	
2019	"Alleen wij" (featuring Numidia)	25	6	
2019	"Badgyal" (featuring Jiri11 and Idaly)	Tip 16	1	
2019	"Faka" (featuring Poke)	36	4	
2019	"Powerwoman"	Tip 11	1	
2020	"Sexy Loca" (featuring Afro Bros)	66	1	
2020	"Amira" (featuring Numidia)	Tip 10	1	
2020	"Jouw moment"	-	-	
2020	"Emotieloos"	Tip 2	4	
2020	"Gister"	-	-	
2020	"Laten Zien"	-	-	
2021	"Vieren" (featuring Vanessa Van Cartier, My Little Puny and Vivaldi)	-	-	
