= Drag Race Holland =

Dutch reality competition television series

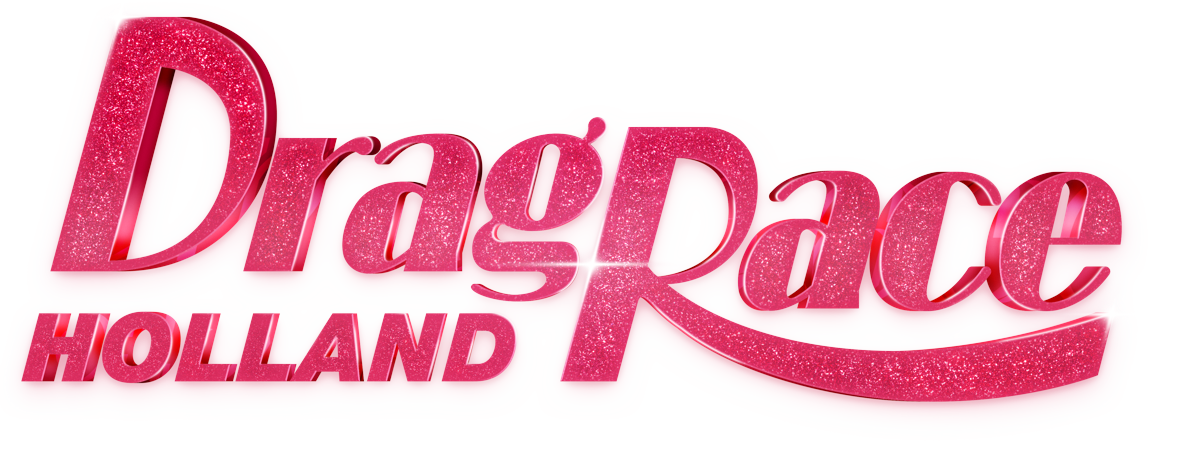
- Genre: Reality competition
- Created by: RuPaul
- Based on: RuPaul's Drag Race
- Presented by: Fred van Leer
- Judges: Fred van Leer; Nikkie Plessen; Marieke Samallo
- Opening theme: RuPaul's Drag Race theme
- Ending theme: "A Little Bit of Love"
- Country of origin: Netherlands
- Original language: Dutch
- No. of seasons: 2
- No. of episodes: 16 (list of episodes)

Production
- Executive producers: Vincent ter Voert; Gerard Martens; Valentijn Moerdijk; Josselien Meijs
- Running time: 50 minutes
- Production companies: World of Wonder; Vincent TV Producties NL

Original release
- Network: Videoland (NL); WOW Presents Plus (International)
- Release: 18 September 2020 – 24 September 2021

Related
- Drag Race franchise

Drag Race Holland is a Dutch reality competition television series based on the American RuPaul's Drag Race. The television series was produced by Vincent TV and World of Wonder. The show was broadcast on the Dutch platform Videoland, an online streaming service owned by RTL, and worldwide on WOW Presents Plus.

Drag Race Holland is the fifth international adaptation of the American reality competition series RuPaul's Drag Race.

The series premiered on 18 September 2020 and concluded 24 September 2021. In October 2024, Herriemakers Productions announced it had acquired the production rights for Drag Race Holland, suggesting the renewal of the series for a third season.

== Format ==
Like the American version, instead of RuPaul, Fred van Leer has several roles within the show, acting as host and judge. As the host, Fred introduces guests, announces the challenges the queens will take part in each week, and reveals who will be leaving the competition. For his role as a judge he critiques the queens on their overall performance of the challenge. The show uses progressive elimination to reduce the number of drag queens in the competition from the initial field of ten contestants, down until the final three or four, who compete in the final challenge, and the final two lip-syncing for the crown. Each episode follows a format consisting of a mini challenge, a main challenge, a runway walk, the judging panel, a lip sync battle, and the elimination of a contestant.

=== Mini challenges ===
In mini challenges, each contestant is asked to perform a different task with varying requirements and time limitations. Certain mini challenges are repeated from the original American seasons. A recurring mini challenge is dedicated to "reading", a drag term for making insulting observations about others for comedic effect, inspired by Paris Is Burning. The winner of a mini challenge is sometimes rewarded with an advantage in the main challenge. Though most episodes have a mini challenge, select episodes do not.

=== Main challenges and runways ===
The requirements of the main challenge vary across each episode, and can be individual or group challenges. The winner of the main challenge also receives a prize for their win, for example a voucher or prize package.

The goal of each maxi challenge involves a new theme and outcome. A recurring main challenge is to design and construct a custom outfit, sometimes incorporating unconventional materials. Other challenges focus on the contestants' ability to present themselves on camera, perform with music, or perform humorously. Some challenges became a tradition across international seasons, such as the "Snatch Game", a ball or a makeover. The contestants walk down a runway presenting outfits. If the main challenge involves the creation of an outfit, that outfit is presented to the judges in the runway. Otherwise, a runway theme is assigned and the contestants must put together a look that fits the theme, which is presented to the judges. The runway looks and presentation are judged along with the maxi challenge performance.

=== Judging panel ===
Season 1's main judges

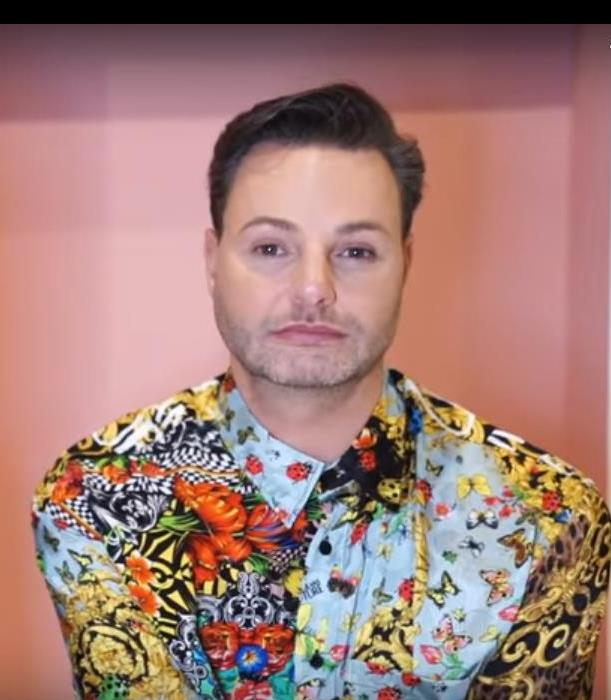
Fred van Leer

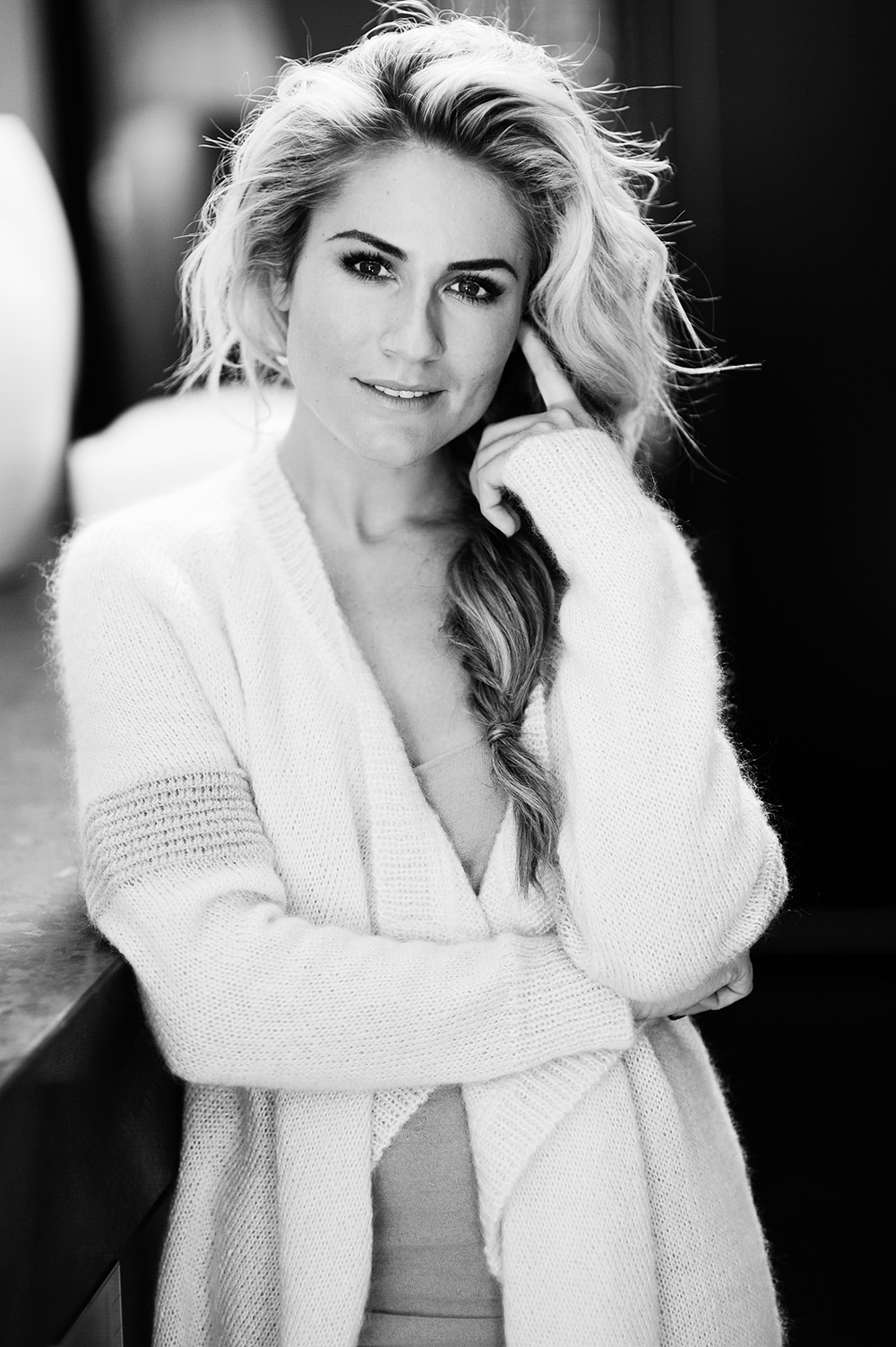
Nikkie Plessen

A panel of judges cast opinions about the challenge performances and runway looks, first to the contestants onstage, and then again with them offstage.

Fred van Leer acts as both the host and main judge, with Nikkie Plessen as supporting judge in the first season. In the second season, Marieke Samallo took over Nikkie Plessen's spot behind the judging table.

Rotating judges in the first season were Sanne Wallis de Vries and Claes Iversen. In the second season, these roles were taken over by Carlo Boszhard and Raven van Dorst.

Judges on Drag Race Holland
Judge	Season	
Judge	1	2
Fred van Leer	Main	Main
Nikkie Plessen	Main	
Marieke Samallo		Main

== Series overview ==
Season	Contestants	Episodes	Originally released		Winner	Runner-up	Miss Congeniality
Season	Contestants	Episodes	First released	Last released	Winner	Runner-up	Miss Congeniality
1	10	8	18 September 2020	6 November 2020	Envy Peru	Janey Jacké	Ma’Ma Queen
2	10	8	6 August 2021	24 September 2021	Vanessa Van Cartier	My Little Puny	Tabitha

=== Season 1 (2020) ===
The first season of Drag Race Holland began airing on 18 September 2020 on Videoland in the Netherlands and World of Wonder's WOW Presents Plus streaming service internationally, and ran for 8 episodes. The cast was announced on 7 September on YouTube. Envy Peru, Janey Jacké, Ma'Ma Queen and Miss Abby OMG made the final, with Envy Peru being crowned the First Dutch Drag Superstar.

=== Season 2 (2021) ===
The second season of Drag Race Holland was confirmed and casting was closed on 1 March 2021. A trailer for the second season was uploaded to YouTube and social media on 9 July. The cast was officially announced on 27 July 2021. The season started airing on 6 August and concluded on 24 September 2021. My Little Puny, Vanessa Van Cartier and Vivaldi made it to the finale, with Vanessa Van Cartier winning the season.

== Contestants ==
There have been a total of 20 contestants featured in the first two seasons of Drag Race Holland, with Envy Peru and Vanessa Van Cartier being crowned Holland's Next Drag Superstars.
