= Merel Baldé =

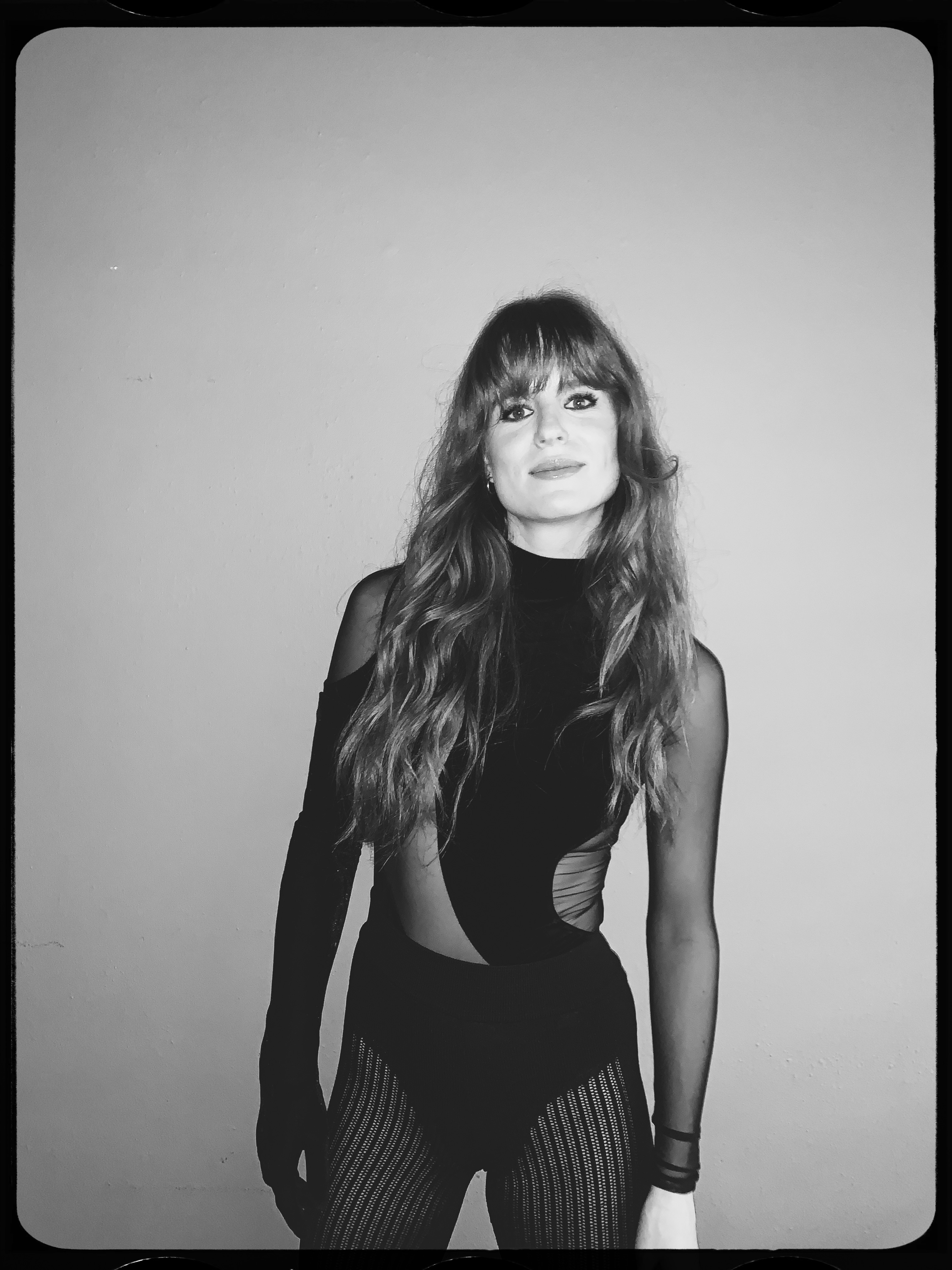
- Baldé in 2022

Background information
- Also known as: MEROL
- Born: 10 February 1991 (age 35); Dordrecht, Netherlands
- Genres: Pop; electronic
- Occupations: Singer; actress
- Years active: 2011–present
- Label: Ammehoela Records
- Website: merol.nl

Merel Baldé (born 10 February 1991), better known by the stage name Merol (stylized in all caps), is a Dutch singer and actress. She rose to fame with the release of the singles "Lekker met de meiden" and "Hou je bek en bef me" (which can be losely translated to "Fine with the girls" and "Shut up and eat me out"), released in 2018 and 2019, respectively.

== Early years ==
Baldé was born in Dordrecht. Her father is an account manager and her mother teaches Dutch. In 2014, she graduated from the Amsterdam Academy of Theatre and Dance. After graduating, she featured in various Dutch theatre plays, television shows and the feature film All You Need Is Love.

== Singing career ==
=== Breakthrough (2018) ===
In 2018, Baldé released her first EP, Boter, under the name MEROL, with her own label Ammehoela Records. From this EP, she released the song "Ik wil een kind van jou" (I want a child from you) as her debut single on Valentine's Day 2018, during which it was performed live on radio. In July of the same year, she released the summer single "Lekker met de meiden" (fun with the girls). The single mocks stereotypes of young (mainly Amsterdam) women, to whom Baldé incidentally includes herself. The single became a hit. She explained on the radio, that it first mainly was a hit among the "gays" and "then came the mainstream girls and now I get mainly straight guys in my DM who want to buy merchandise". The Christmas single Kerst met de fam about 'Christmas clichés' was released at the end of 2018.

=== Hou je bek en bef me (2019) ===
On Valentine's Day 2019, the controversial single "Hou je bek en bef me" (shut up and lick my pussy) was released. The explicit lyrics about women's sexual experience evoked many reactions. Baldé explained that she "always needs to be a little embarrassed about a song" and that although she herself found it "quite uncomfortable", the song is indeed "autobiographical". She wrote the song in response to the explicit sexuality in mostly male rappers' lyrics and wanted "a woman to also [sing] what she needs for once". Whereas the artist initially, especially in response to this single, called herself an "accidental feminist", she later backtracked on that and indicated that she considers feminism a very important cause. Apart from the success in the Netherlands, the song was also a hit in Belgium. According to Baldé, there was a more prudish and indignant reaction to the song in Belgium than in the Netherlands. At the end of 2019, "Hou je bek en bef me" won Baldé her first award; Song of the Year 2019.

Baldé at Song of the Year in 2018

=== After breakthrough (2019–2020) ===
In March 2019, Baldé gave her first and second public performances at Paradiso a major music podium in the Netherlands. The documentary Lekker met MEROL from July of that year shows the preparations for her first concert. Together with rapper Bokoesam, the singer released the single Geen reet (no ass) in mid-2019. According to Baldé, Geen reet was a body positivity statement against the reactions that ridiculed her body, and she cited American singer Lizzo as an inspiration. Furthermore, the single "Krijg het er geil van" (making me horny) was released in August in collaboration with rapper Gotu Jim. In October 2019, Baldé released her second EP titled "Superlatief" (superlative), of which the singles "Dan maar jij" (I guess then you) and "Superlatieven"' (Superlatives) had been previously released. To promote "Superlatief", Baldé went on a club tour through the Netherlands and Belgium and gave an end of the year concert at Paradiso, her fourth performance on the major pop stage that year.

As the first single of 2020, Baldé released "Slippertje" (little affair/accident/flip flop) in collaboration with the museum Mauritshuis. As part of the musical project View the Mauritshuis with your ears, she drew her inspiration for her adultery song from Joachim Wtewael's 1601 painting Mars and Venus Caught by Vulcan. She performed the song for the first time in the museum's foyer.

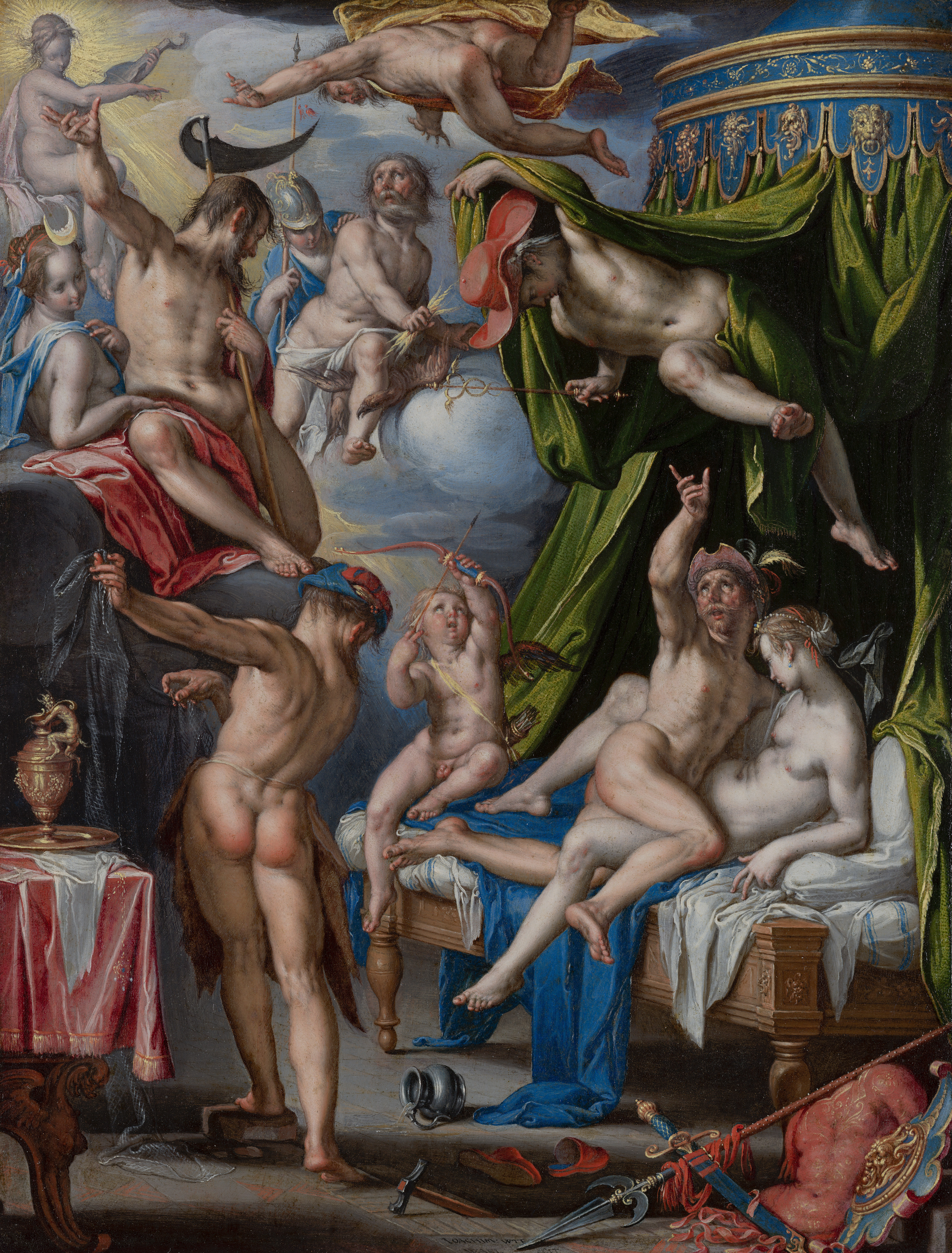
The painting Mars and Venus Caught by Vulcan, about two Roman gods caught in adultery, served as the inspiration for Baldé's single Slippertje.

=== During the COVID-19 pandemic (2020–2021) ===
To continue the tradition of Valentine's Day singles, the song "Binnendingen" (inside things) was released in February 2020. After the outbreak of the COVID-19 pandemic, Baldé posted a list of potential songs on her Instagram account. The song 'Houseparty' from that list, referring to the video calling app that exploded in popularity during the first COVID wave, was eventually recorded and released. That same week, in collaboration with comedian and television host Arjen Lubach, the song and music video "Ik **** je op afstand" (I **** you remotely) was released. Remotely referring to the COVID rules.

In the summer of 2020, the single "Je vais vite (op de campingdisco)" (I go fast (French) on the camping disco (Dutch)) was released, followed by "Knaldrang" (blast urge) in November. The music video for "Knaldrang" was shot in several Amsterdam clubs, which were closed for months due to the COVID crisis and received little government support or perspective. As such, the song was an "ode to nightlife". ' Baldé's first single in 2021 was the fourth Valentine's Day single called "Foefsafari" (pussy safari) in which, just as in "Hou je bek en bef me" she called attention to the orgasm gap between women and men. In April 2021, Baldé performed twice for so-called test events, where visitors were admitted based on a negative coronal test.

=== Troostprijs (2021–now) ===
In September 2021, Baldé released the single "Vol" (full). This song was the lead single of her debut album Troostprijs (Consolation Prize), released on 15 April 2022. The song was a hit in the Flemish charts due to her appearance in the Flemish program De Slimste Mens ter Wereld at the time.

== Music style ==
Baldé's style is described as pop with influences of "girl pop", "synth-pop" and "electropop", with a lot of camp. As for the lyrics, Baldé strives to "make fun of the Dutch language". She wants her songs to contain irony and multiple layers.

=== Merol, the character ===
The name 'Merol' came about when Baldé as a girl wanted to make a necklace of her name but only had one 'e'. Baldé wants to turn Merol into a real pop star, as she feels such a role is lacking in the down-to-earth Dutch music scene.

== Discography ==
=== Albums ===
Album title	Release date	Charting in the Dutch Album Top 100			Comments
Album title	Release date	Date of entry	Highest	Weeks	Comments
Troostprijs	2022	23–04–2022	8	5	

=== EPs ===
Boter (2018)
Nr.	Title	Writer(s)	Producer(s)	Duration
1.	TREK T UIT	Merel Baldé		3:17
2.	IK WIL EEN KIND VAN JOU	Merel Baldé		3:20
3.	BEDGIRL	Merel Baldé		3:17
4.	LIEFDESLIEDJE	Merel Baldé		3:11
Totaal:				13:05

Superlatief (2019)
Nr.	Title	Writer(s)	Producer(s)	Duration
1.	Plankje	Merel Baldé, Didier de Ruyter	Baldé, De Ruyter	2:20
2.	Superlatieven	Baldé	Soulsearchin	2:17
3.	Tien Voor Topo	Baldé, Koen van de Wardt	Baldé, Van de Wardt	3:09
4.	Dan Maar Jij	Baldé, Van de Wardt	Baldé, Van de Wardt	2:55
5.	Plek Voor Jack	Baldé, Max Oude Weernink, Tim Teunissen	Bart Possemis, Weernink	2:29
6.	Rick Lekker Bezig Pik	Baldé, Abel Tuinsta, De Ruyter, Jochem Smaal, Teunissen	De Ruyter, Tuinstra, Smaal	3:11
Totaal:				16:24

=== Singles ===
Song title	Release date	Comment
Ik wil een kind van jou	2018	–
Lekker met de meiden	26–07–2018	Nr. 85 in the Single Top 100
Borderline	05–10–2018	–
Kerst met de fam	07–12–2018	–
Hou je bek en bef me	08–02–2019	3voor12 Song of the year 2019
Geen reet	07–06–2019	Together with Bokoesam
Krijg het er geil van	16–08–2019	Together with Gotu Jim
Dan maar jij	27–09–2019	–
Superlatieven	11–10–2019	–
Slippertje	24–01–2020	–
Binnendingen	14–02–2020	–
Houseparty	10–01–2020	–
Ik **** je op afstand	18–04–2020	Together with Arjen Lubach
Je vais vite (op de campingdisco)	06–08–2020	–
Knaldrang	24–11–2020	–
Foefsafari	12–02–2021	–
Feromonen	04–06–2021	As promotion for the series Follow de SOA
Vol	15–09–2021	–
Patronen	14–01–2022	–
Gemengde signalen	18–03–2022	–

== Filmography and theatre ==
=== Music videos ===
Year	Song title
2020
2020	'Ik wil een kind van jou'
2020	'Lekker met de meiden'
2020	'Kerst met de fam'
2019
2019	'Hou je bek en bef me'
2019	'Barry Hayze'
2019	'Geen reet'
2019	'Krijg het er geil van'
2019	'Dan maar jij'
2020
2020	'Je vais vite (op de campingdisco)'
2020	'Knaldrang'
2021
2021	'Foefsafari'
2021	'Vol'

=== Television ===
Year	Film	Role	Comments
2012	De meisjes van Thijs	Odette	
2015	Flikken Maastricht	Julia Swaans	
2019	De Slimste Mens	Herself	In two episodes
2021	Follow de SOA	Math teacher Ms. Veurtsen	Videoland Original, in three episodes
2021	Drag Race Holland	Herself (Jury member)	Episode 6
2021	De Slimste Mens ter Wereld	Herself	In ten episodes, reached second place

=== Film ===
Year	Film	Role	Comment
2018	All You Need Is Love	Stephanie	
2019	Lekker met Merol	Herself	TV documentary leading up to Baldé's first concert in Paradiso

=== Theatre ===
Year	Theater play	Role/Comments
2013	Talloze namen	while studying at the Amsterdamse Toneelschool & Kleinkunstacademie
2013	Scrooge!	
2014	Schuinsmarcheerders	graduation play at the Amsterdamse Toneelschool & Kleinkunstacademie
2015	Kuyper & Wilhelmina	as young Wilhelmina
2015–2016	Soldier of Orange	as Charlotte
2015–2018	Trek 't Uit	
2017	Die Hermannsschlacht	
2018	Kwispelsteertje	
