= Raven van Dorst =

Dutch singer and television presenter

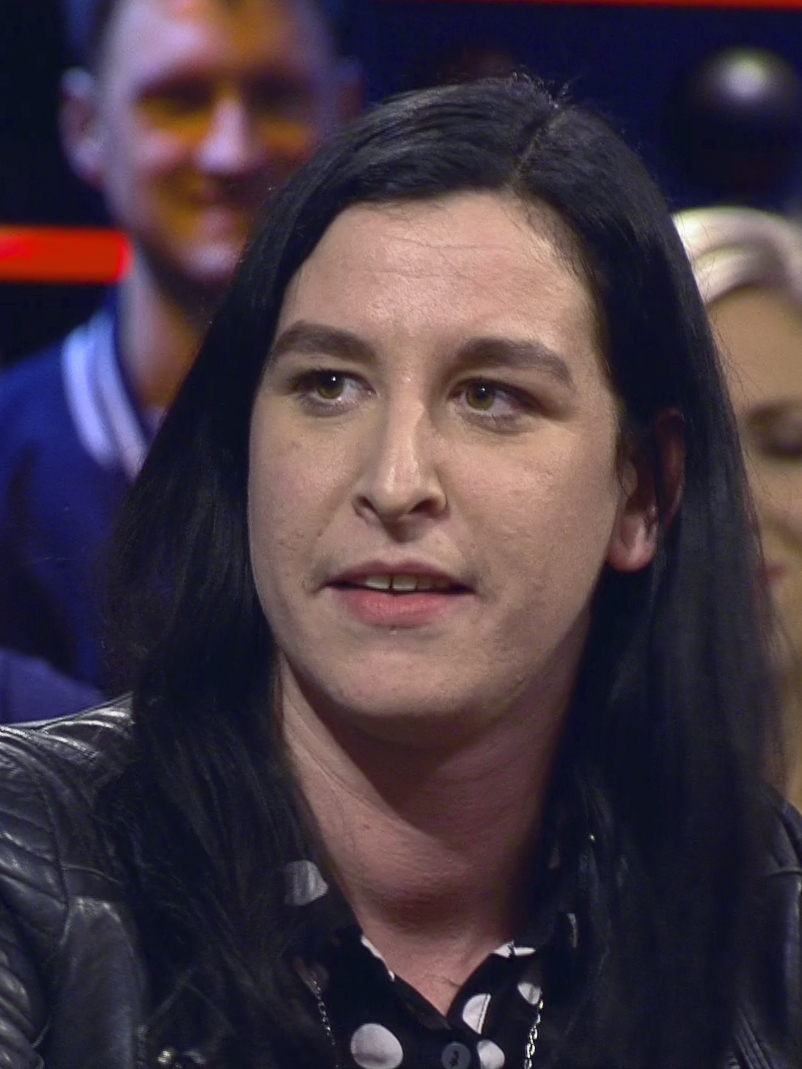
- Van Dorst in 2018

Background information
- Also known as: Elle Bandita
- Born: 11 September 1984 (age 41); Vlaardingen, Netherlands
- Genres: Rock; punk rock; psychedelic rock; doom metal
- Occupations: Singer; television presenter; actor; podcaster
- Instruments: Vocals; guitar
- Years active: 2002–present
- Labels: PIAS, Caroline Records, Tocado-Records

Raven van Dorst (born 11 September 1984) is a Dutch singer, guitarist, television presenter, actor and podcaster. Van Dorst is the lead singer of the Dutch rock band Dool, and has previously also performed under the stage name Elle Bandita.

As Elle Bandita, van Dorst released two albums, Queen of Fools (2009), and Elle Bandita (2014). Van Dorst was also a member of the groups The Riplets, Bad Candy, and Anne Frank Zappa.

Van Dorst stars in the TV series Nachtdieren ("Night Animals"), and is a judge in the TV show Drag Race Holland. They also appeared in their own reality TV show, Boerderij van Dorst ("Van Dorst's Farmhouse").

They are intersex, and has spoken publicly about the medical intervention that removed their male sex characteristics at an early age. They identify as non-binary, and have made a documentary series, Geslacht!, about gender identity.
