= Fred van Leer =

Dutch stylist and presenter (born 1976)

- Born: Fred van Leer; 18 September 1976 (age 50); Alblasserdam, Netherlands
- Presenting career
- Show: Holland's Next Top Model; Drag Race Holland
- Country: Netherlands

Fred van Leer (born 18 September 1976) is a Dutch stylist and presenter. Van Leer is best known for mentoring and judging on the Dutch television program Holland's Next Top Model. In 2020, van Leer was appointed as host for the Dutch adaptation of the American RuPaul's Drag Race.

== Career ==
From age 19 until 28, van Leer worked as a stylist at Now&Wow club nights.

During the 1990s and the 2000s, van Leer was a prominent drag queen in the Netherlands.

In the early 2010s, van Leer started appearing on various television programs, including Holland's Next Top Model, Say Yes to the Dress Benelux, and since 2020, he acts as host in Drag Race Holland.

== Personal life ==
Van Leer is openly gay.

== Filmography ==
=== Television ===
Year	Title	Role	Notes	Ref.
2011–16	Holland's Next Top Model	Coach, judge		
2012–15	Shopping Queens	Presenter		
2012	Wie is de reisleider?			
2015	Ranking the Stars	Contestant		
2015	Shopping Queens VIPS	Presenter		
2017	Chantal blijft slapen	Guest	1 episode	
2017	Risky Rivers	Guest	1 episode	
2017	Oh, wat een jaar!	Guest	1 episode	
2017	Een goed stel hersens	Guest	1 episode	
2018	Say Yes to the Dress Benelux	Presenter		
2018	Fred van Leer: Alles uit de kast	Presenter		
2019	6 Inside	Insider		
2020–present	Drag Race Holland	Host and main judge		
2020	I Can See Your Voice	Panelist		
2021	Chantals Beauty Camper	Presenter		
2021	Make Up Your Mind	Panelist		

=== Film ===
Year	Title	Role	Ref.
2017	Huisvrouwen bestaan niet	Bram	
2019	Huisvrouwen bestaan niet 2	Bram	

=== Web series ===
Year	Title	Role	Notes
2017	Het Jachtseizoen	Contestant	

== Theatre ==
Year	Title	Role	Notes	Ref.
2018	The Christmas Show	Angry stepmother		
2018–present	Leer van Fred LIVE	Host		
