= Videoland (Netherlands) =

Dutch video on demand service

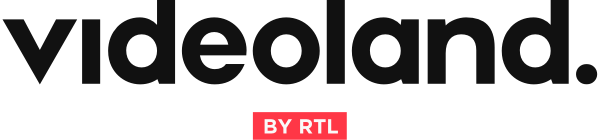
- Type: Subsidiary
- Founded: 1984; 42 years ago
- Founders: Nico Broersen; Gerard van Stijn
- Headquarters: Hilversum, Netherlands
- Services: Video on demand Service (2010–present); VHS/DVD home video rentals (1984–2013)
- Parent: Philips (1992–1996); Entertainment Retail Group (1997–2011); Moving Pictures Holding (2011–2013); RTL Group / Bertelsmann (2013–2025); DPG Media (2025–)
- Website: videoland.com

Videoland is a Dutch OTT online service provider owned by RTL Nederland, since 1 july 2025 a subsidiary of DPG Media. From 2013 till 2025 it was part of RTL Group (Bertelsmann). Originally it was a retail chain of video rental stores. Its main competitor is Netflix. Until June 30, 2026 Videoland was registrered as a VOD-service in Luxembourg; hence the law of Luxembourg (as is for the TV-stations RTL 4, RTL 5 etc.) applied to Videoland. Since July 1, 2026, Videoland became by law a Netherlands-registered activity.

== History ==
Videoland was founded by Nico Broersen and Gerard van Stijn and opened its first video rental store in 1984. From 1992 to 1996, Philips was the owner, and took over the management in the Netherlands. In 2004, the 200th store opened.

By the end of the 2000s, video stores came under more pressure due to the rise of video-on-demand services. Parent company Entertainment Retail Group filed for bankruptcy in 2010. The Videoland formula and franchise were then acquired by Moving Pictures Holding.

== Video-on-Demand service ==
Videoland on Demand launched in 2010 and RTL Nederland (RTL Group) took a share of 65% in 2013. Since 2015, Videoland on Demand is fully owned by RTL Nederland (RTL Group). As a result, Videoland's rental stores closed their doors.

Since 2015, the company has also been producing its own programs for its video-on-demand service.

Since 1 july 2025 Videoland is owned by DPG Media.

== Awards ==
- In the fall of 2018, Videoland won a Hashtag Award in the category Best Video on Demand with the series Mocro Maffia.
- In May 2020, Videoland won two The Best Social Awards in the categories Best Positive Impact and Best Launch with the documentary Bont Girl, by Famke Louise.
