= Holland's Next Top Model season 7 =

Holland's Next Top Model
- Season 7
- Judges: Anouk Smulders; Dirk Kikstra; May-Britt Mobach
- No. of contestants: 13
- Winner: Nicky Opheij
- No. of episodes: 9

Release
- Original network: RTL 5
- Original release: 1 September – 27 October 2014

Season chronology
- ← Previous; Cycle 6 Next → Cycle 8

The seventh cycle of Holland's Next Top Model premiered on 1 September 2014 on RTL 5. This was the second cycle of the series to be hosted by Anouk Smulders. Previous judges Sharon Mor Yosef and Sabine Geurten did not return for the new cycle. They were replaced by photographer Dirk Kikstra and magazine editor May-Britt Mobach, respectively. Fred van Leer remained in place as a mentor for the contestants.

The prizes for this cycle included a modelling contract with Touché Models valued at €50,000, an online feature on the style and fashion website Amayzine.com, replacing the sponsorship of the show's magazine, Glamour, and a brand new Renault Twingo.

The winner of the competition was 19-year-old Nicky Opheij from the province of North Brabant.

== Format changes ==
The show scrapped the previous cycle's apartment reward for the best performing contestants, but still maintained the new elimination format.

The show once again held a separate wildcard contest, sponsored by Colgate, to choose an additional 13th contestant. Applicants were allowed to apply for the contest on the show's website, where the twenty-five candidates with the most votes from the public would be considered for a spot on the show. The winner of the search was 21 year-old Sanne de Roo from Groningen, who joined the 12 other finalists during the filming of the opening titles in episode 1.

During the cycle's live final, the position of the fourth and third placing contestants was decided through a consensus of the judges, while the viewer vote determined the winner from the remaining two contestants.

== Cast ==
=== Contestants ===
(Ages stated are at start of contest)

Name	Age	Height	Province	Finish	Place
Quinty Henskens	16	1.79 m (5 ft 10 1/2 in)	Overijssel	Episode 1	13
Aniek Arisse	17	1.74 m (5 ft 8 1/2 in)	Gelderland	Episode 2	12
Sagal Suleiman	24	1.74 m (5 ft 8 1/2 in)	Flevoland	Episode 3	11–10
Roos Samwel	16	1.72 m (5 ft 7 1/2 in)	North Holland	Episode 3	11–10
Allison Augustus	16	1.80 m (5 ft 11 in)	Limburg	Episode 4	9
Lincey Hegener	17	1.76 m (5 ft 9 1/2 in)	North Holland	Episode 5	8–7
Holly Brood	19	1.72 m (5 ft 7 1/2 in)	North Holland	Episode 5	8–7
June Walton	21	1.78 m (5 ft 10 in)	North Holland	Episode 6	6
Liz Lucasse	22	1.72 m (5 ft 7 1/2 in)	Zeeland	Episode 7	5
Aisha Kazumba	20	1.81 m (5 ft 11 1/2 in)	Overijssel	Episode 9	4
Debbie Dhillon	19	1.74 m (5 ft 8 1/2 in)	North Holland	Episode 9	3
Sanne de Roo	21	1.80 m (5 ft 11 in)	Groningen	Episode 9	2
Nicky Opheij	19	1.81 m (5 ft 11 1/2 in)	North Brabant	Episode 9	1

=== Judges ===
- Anouk Smulders (host)
- Dirk Kikstra
- May-Britt Mobach

=== Other cast members ===
- Fred van Leer

== Episodes ==
No. overall	No. in season	Title	Original release date
58	1	"Episode 1"	1 September 2014
The judges made their selection for the final 12 at a mass casting, and later visited each finalist to break the good news. The contestants then met for the first time and learned that they would be heading off to New York sometime in the coming weeks. Aisha, Debbie, Holly, June and Nicky received makeovers, and the models moved into a run-down warehouse loft in anticipation for the trip to New York City. They later filmed the show's opening sequence. At the end of the week they were shown a final cut of the footage, and learned that a 13th model would be joining the competition. Anouk introduced the contestants to Sanne, who had been chosen as a wildcard through the show's website. At the end of the episode, Quinty was eliminated from the competition.: Special guests: Freek Koster, Jeffrey Janssen
59	2	"Episode 2"	8 September 2014
The contestants had an extreme posing lesson with choreographer Roy Julen, and were sent on a casting for fashion and lifestyle brand JOSH V, where designer Josh Veldhuizen selected Aisha, Sanne, June, Roos, Liz, Allison, Debbie, and Holly to walk in one of her upcoming shows. The models were later taken to a landfill, and had a couture photo shoot with photographer Andres de Lara modeling creations by Winde Rienstra. At elimination, Aniek, Roos, and Sagal landed in the bottom three. Sagal and Roos were given another chance, and Aniek was eliminated from the competition.: Special guests: Roy Julen, Josh Veldhuizen, Annic van Wonderen, Winde Rienstra; Featured photographer:Andres de Lara
60	3	"Episode 3"	15 September 2014
The contestants were taken to the Van Ghent Kazerne academy to receive boot camp training from one of the sergeants. Lincey was deemed to be the best performer. The remaining models were later given makeovers at the Jeffrey Janssen salon, while Aisha, Debbie, Holly, June, and Nicky received a visit from reporter Anette Baksen for interviews. On set, the models were harnessed in the air wearing designs by Liselore Frowijn in a CGI photo shoot meant to advertise the new Renault Twingo. At panel, Roos and Sagal landed in the bottom two, and left the competition in a surprise double elimination.: Special guests: Jeffrey Janssen, Anette Baksen; Featured photographer: Ruud Baan
61	4	"Episode 4"	22 September 2014
The remaining nine contestants were flown to New York City, and moved into their new loft. They were later taken to The Skylark Lounge, and met cycle 4 finalist Patricia van der Vliet, who shared her work experience with the models and critiqued their runway walks. The models also had a go-sees challenge with Trump Model Management and Nicole Miller, which was won by Nicky, and had a self-directed nighttime glam photo shoot in Times Square where they were photographed by judge Dirk Kikstra. At elimination, Allison and Holly landed in the bottom two, and Allison became the fifth contestant to leave the competition.: Special guests: Patricia van der Vliet, Freek Koster, Nicole Miller; Featured photographer: Dirk Kikstra
62	5	"Episode 5"	29 September 2014
The contestants received a runway lesson at Central Park from catwalk coach Mac Folkes, and had a two-part casting challenge with Yentl cosmetics and designer Jay Godfrey. Liz was chosen as the winner for the Yentl casting, while Aisha was deemed as the best performer during the casting for Jay Godfrey, and was chosen to walk in his upcoming show during Mercedes-Benz Fashion Week. The models later had a photo shoot at a fire station for Colgate with photographer Marco Marezza where they had to pose with male models. At elimination, Holly and Lincey were eliminated from the competition.: Special guests: Mac Folkes, Natalie Joos, Dimitri Hyacinthe, Jay Godfrey, Emilie Tollison; Featured photographer: Marco Marezza
63	6	"Episode 6"	6 October 2014
The contestants were introduced to director Cycy Sanders, and were sent out on the streets to shoot personalized video clips for their next challenge. Nicky was chosen as the winner, and received the opportunity to shoot a video with Sanders. The models were later taken to a construction site, and found out that they would be shooting a campaign for Zinzi jewelry on a rooftop while hanging from a circus ring. Cycle 2 winner Kim Feenstra made an appearance on set to coach the models during their shoot. At elimination, Aisha, June, and Liz landed in the bottom three, and June was eliminated from the competition.: Special guests: Cycy Sanders, Kim Feenstra
64	7	"Episode 7"	13 October 2014
The final five arrived at the Diane von Furstenberg store, where they were introduced to celebrity stylist Anita Patrickson for an in-depth critique of their outfits. They then had to restyle themselves with clothing from the store, and attended a casting for American Apparel, which was won by Sanne. As her prize, she was given a shopping spree for two which she chose to share with Aisha. On the day of the shoot the models were taken to the beach, and were photographed topless wearing pearl necklaces. At elimination, Nicky advanced directly to the finale. Debbie, Sanne, and Aisha quickly followed suit, and Liz was eliminated from the competition.: Special guests: Anita Patrickson, Johnny Umansky, Andi Elloway; Featured photographer: Frédéric Pinet
65	8	"Episode 8"	20 October 2014
The models sat with host Anouk Smulders and reminisced about the events leading up to the final, and the show took a closer look at the day-to-day lives of the four finalists as they prepared for the cycle's live finale.
66	9	"Episode 9"	27 October 2014
The judges explained the new voting system for the finale, in which they would be responsible for eliminating the first two finalists, and the public would choose the winner out of the two remaining contestants. The finalists performed in a series of live runway shows alongside the previously eliminated contestants, and the show went over footage of the models performing in a cover photo shoot for Amayzine.com in which they had to embody different iconic supermodels. After the final results were shown, Aisha was eliminated from the competition. She was followed by Debbie later that night. The SMS voting began, and at the end of the night, Nicky was crowned as the winner.: Special guests: Freek Koster; Featured photographer: Dirk Kikstra

== Results ==
Order	Episodes								
Order	1		2	3	4	5	6	7	9
1	Debbie	Allison	Aisha	June	Liz	Sanne	Sanne	Nicky	Nicky
2	Allison	Nicky	Holly	Debbie	June	Liz	Debbie	Debbie	Sanne
3	Lincey	Debbie	Nicky	Aisha	Sanne	Debbie	Nicky	Sanne	Debbie
4	Nicky	Aniek	Sanne	Holly	Aisha	Holly	Liz	Aisha	Aisha
5	June	Aisha	June	Nicky	Lincey	Aisha	Aisha	Liz	
6	Aniek	Sagal	Lincey	Sanne	Nicky	Nicky	June		
7	Holly	June	Allison	Allison	Debbie	June			
8	Sagal	Liz	Liz	Liz	Holly	Lincey			
9	Liz	Holly	Debbie	Lincey	Allison				
10	Aisha	Lincey	Sagal	Sagal					
11	Quinty	Roos	Roos	Roos					
12	Roos	Quinty	Aniek						

The contestant was eliminated
The contestant won the competition
