= Michel Bruyninckx =

Belgian football coach

Michel Bruyninckx is a Belgian football coach. Michel has spent most of his working life in the world of teaching and professional football. After being technical director youth academy and youth coach in several professional football clubs among which R.S.C. Anderlecht, Bruyninckx acted as director of the Standard de Liège youth academy in 2012. In 2013, he worked for the Aspire Academy (Qatar) as co-director in charge of reshaping the training programs.

His research, specialization and experience in the field have allowed him to devise the CogiTraining method as well as the practice of SenseBall, a training method that combines football training with neurological exercises to enhance an athlete's cognitive development and improve his football skills. While a pro footballer touches the ball on average 50,000 times in one season, with senseball, he touches it 500.000 times.

Michel Bruyninckx refined his method in collaboration with the Royal Belgian Football Association and the Catholic University of Louvain over an 11-year period between 2000 and 2011 and is now considered as the "mind guru" and by some people credited with the development of Belgium's current crop of world stars.

Michel has trained and counselled numerous young footballers who are now professionals among which Dries Mertens (FC Napoli), Steven Defour (Burnley F.C.), Sven Kums (R.S.C. Anderlecht), Omar El Kaddouri (PAOK FC), Faris Haroun (Royal Antwerp F.C.), Imke Courtois (Standard Liège (women)).

Michel Bruyninckx is currently lecturer worldwide regarding brain central learning based on cognitive neurology, neuropsychology and neurobiology in sports. The importance of intelligence in modern football has led him to be regularly consulted by many professional football clubs and associations around the world among which A.C. Milan, FC Metz, Sporting Kansas City, K.R.C. Genk, Altınordu F.K. or FC Lugano.

In addition to the sports aspect, Michel Bruyninckx's method, by developing and organizing the brain, enhance learning at school. After practising this method for a year, on average children's results at school improve by 10% which in part can be explained by a better concentration capacity.
