= Benelux' Next Top Model season 1 =

Benelux' Next Top Model
- Season 1
- No. of episodes: 10

Release
- Original network: 2BE, RTL 5
- Original release: September 14 – November 16, 2009

Season chronology
- Next → Season 2

Benelux' Next Top Model, Season 1 was the first season of Benelux' Next Top Model and the first season which include Dutch and Flemish contestants. It premiered on September 14, 2009, and lasted until November 16 of the same year.

Given the show was a merge between Holland's Next Top Model and the Belgian Topmodel which both follow the same format, the panel of judges, as well as the contestants, were representing both nations for one-half.

22-year-old Rosalinde Kikstra from Rotterdam was the winner of the competition. Her prize included a €75,000 contract with Modelmasters The Agency, a cover of Beau Monde and ad campaigns for Max Factor and Gillette Venus Embrace.

== Contestants ==
(ages stated are at start of contest)

| Name | Age | Height | Hometown | Outcome | Place |
|---|---|---|---|---|---|
| Alexandra Carnewal | 22 | 1.76 m (5 ft 9 1/2 in) | Belgium | Episode 1 | 13 |
| Roxanne de Craene | 21 | 1.80 m (5 ft 11 in) | Mechelen, Belgium | Episode 2 | 12-11 |
| Adinda Kennedy | 17 | 1.78 m (5 ft 10 in) | Baarn, Netherlands | Episode 2 | 12-11 |
| Sarah van der Meer | 22 | 1.74 m (5 ft 8 1/2 in) | The Hague, Netherlands | Episode 3 | 10 |
| Melanie Weterings | 22 | 1.76 m (5 ft 9 1/2 in) | Netherlands | Episode 4 | 9-8 |
| Tessa Kort | 17 | 1.76 m (5 ft 9 1/2 in) | Doesburg, Netherlands | Episode 4 | 9-8 |
| Justine Desmet | 16 | 1.80 m (5 ft 11 in) | Bruges, Belgium | Episode 5 | 7 |
| Bianca Kortzorg | 23 | 1.77 m (5 ft 9 1/2 in) | Belgium | Episode 6 | 6 |
| Catharina Elias | 21 | 1.80 m (5 ft 11 in) | Bruges, Belgium | Episode 7 | 5 |
| Lianne Bakker | 21 | 1.77 m (5 ft 9 1/2 in) | Amsterdam, Netherlands | Episode 8 | 4 |
| Maxime van Steenvoort | 17 | 1.78 m (5 ft 10 in) | Brasschaat, Belgium | Episode 10 | 3-2 |
| Denise Menes | 21 | 1.74 m (5 ft 8 1/2 in) | Netherlands | Episode 10 | 3-2 |
| Rosalinde Kikstra | 22 | 1.81 m (5 ft 11 1/2 in) | Rotterdam, Netherlands | Episode 10 | 1 |

== Episodes ==
| No. overall | No. in season | Title | Original release date |
|---|---|---|---|
| 1 | 1 | "Episode 1" | 14 September 2009 |
20 contestants do a photo shoot, without make-up and dressed in a garbage bag, at an abandoned factory. After, they spend the night at a military camp. The next morning, they do a catwalk training, and then do a fashion show for designer Daryl Van Wouw. Daphne chooses 12 girls who will be allowed into the Top Model mansion and enter the competition, but then adds Melanie as a wildcard. After another photo shoot, Alexandra is eliminated.
| 2 | 2 | "Episode 2" | 21 September 2009 |
Janice Dickinson pays a visit to the Top Model Mansion to give the contestants a catwalk lesson. Later, they have a meeting with Modelmasters The Agency, who will award the winner a contract worth €75,000. The next day, the girl receive makeovers, for a photo shoot at a cemetery. Roxanne and Adinda have to go home.
| 3 | 3 | "Episode 3" | 28 September 2009 |
| 4 | 4 | "Episode 4" | 5 October 2009 |
| 5 | 5 | "Episode 5" | 12 October 2009 |
| 16 | 6 | "Episode 6" | 19 October 2009 |
| 7 | 7 | "Episode 7" | 26 October 2009 |
The five remaining contestants girls arrive in Miami, and are shown different modeling agencies and designers. Lianne wins an event and gets to go on a shopping spree. The next day, the models have their first shoot on a real American rodeo bull. They all have to get used to the idea that the thing is moving. Mariana lets herself go completely in her commentary. Later, they have to showcase their acting qualities again on their next photoshoot with an old-timer Corvette and have to pretend that they have run out of fuel. All models appear with the judges again and receive criticism of their photos. Lianne poses too sexy, Maxime's photos are terrible, Denise has to show more passion, Rosalinde is too heavy and Catharina is not look like a top model. And as the result, she must pack her bags and go home.
| 8 | 8 | "Episode 8" | 2 November 2009 |
Special guests: Featured photographer:
| 9 | 9 | "Episode 9" | 9 November 2009 |
| 0 | 10 | "Episode 10" | 16 November 2009 |
Featured photographer:

== Summaries ==
=== Call-out order ===
| Order | Episodes | | | | | | | | | |
| Order | 1 (Note: In episode 1, only Alexandra was called being told she was eliminated.) | | 2 | 3 | 4 (Note: In episode 4, Denise was immune from elimination for winning the challenge.) | 5 | 6 | 7 | 8 | 10 |
|---|---|---|---|---|---|---|---|---|---|---|
| 1 | Catharina | Adinda; Bianca; Catharina; Denise; Justine; Lianne; Maxime; Melanie; Rosalinde; Roxanne; Sarah; Tessa | Maxime | Denise | Denise | Bianca | Denise | Rosalinde | Maxime | Rosalinde |
| 2 | Bianca | Adinda; Bianca; Catharina; Denise; Justine; Lianne; Maxime; Melanie; Rosalinde; Roxanne; Sarah; Tessa | Catharina | Tessa | Rosalinde | Maxime | Lianne | Lianne | Denise | Denise; Maxime |
| 3 | Lianne | Adinda; Bianca; Catharina; Denise; Justine; Lianne; Maxime; Melanie; Rosalinde; Roxanne; Sarah; Tessa | Melanie | Melanie | Justine | Rosalinde | Maxime | Maxime | Rosalinde | Denise; Maxime |
| 4 | Roxanne | Adinda; Bianca; Catharina; Denise; Justine; Lianne; Maxime; Melanie; Rosalinde; Roxanne; Sarah; Tessa | Sarah | Maxime | Maxime | Catharina | Rosalinde | Denise | Lianne | |
| 5 | Denise | Adinda; Bianca; Catharina; Denise; Justine; Lianne; Maxime; Melanie; Rosalinde; Roxanne; Sarah; Tessa | Tessa | Bianca | Lianne | Denise | Catharina | Catharina | | |
| 6 | Adinda | Adinda; Bianca; Catharina; Denise; Justine; Lianne; Maxime; Melanie; Rosalinde; Roxanne; Sarah; Tessa | Justine | Catharina | Bianca | Lianne | Bianca | | | |
| 7 | Rosalinde | Adinda; Bianca; Catharina; Denise; Justine; Lianne; Maxime; Melanie; Rosalinde; Roxanne; Sarah; Tessa | Rosalinde | Lianne | Catharina | Justine | | | | |
| 8 | Justine | Adinda; Bianca; Catharina; Denise; Justine; Lianne; Maxime; Melanie; Rosalinde; Roxanne; Sarah; Tessa | Lianne | Rosalinde | Tessa | | | | | |
| 9 | Maxime | Adinda; Bianca; Catharina; Denise; Justine; Lianne; Maxime; Melanie; Rosalinde; Roxanne; Sarah; Tessa | Bianca | Justine | Melanie | | | | | |
| 10 | Sarah | Adinda; Bianca; Catharina; Denise; Justine; Lianne; Maxime; Melanie; Rosalinde; Roxanne; Sarah; Tessa | Denise | Sarah | | | | | | |
| 11 | Alexandra | Adinda; Bianca; Catharina; Denise; Justine; Lianne; Maxime; Melanie; Rosalinde; Roxanne; Sarah; Tessa | Adinda; Roxanne | | | | | | | |
| 12 | Tessa | Adinda; Bianca; Catharina; Denise; Justine; Lianne; Maxime; Melanie; Rosalinde; Roxanne; Sarah; Tessa | Adinda; Roxanne | | | | | | | |
| 13 | | Alexandra | | | | | | | | |

The contestant was put through collectively to the next round
The contestant was eliminated
The contestant was immune from elimination
The contestant won the competition

== Bottom two ==
| Episode | Contestants | | | Eliminated |
|---|---|---|---|---|
| 1 | None | | | Alexandra |
| 2 | Adinda | & | Roxanne | Adinda |
| 2 | Adinda | & | Roxanne | Roxanne |
| 3 | Justine | & | Sarah | Sarah |
| 4 | Melanie | & | Tessa | Melanie |
| 4 | Melanie | & | Tessa | Tessa |
| 5 | Justine | & | Lianne | Justine |
| 6 | Bianca | & | Catharina | Bianca |
| 7 | Catharina | & | Denise | Catharina |
| 8 | Lianne | & | Rosalinde | Lianne |
| 10 | Denise | Maxime | Rosalinde | Denise |
| 10 | Denise | Maxime | Rosalinde | Maxime |

The contestant was eliminated after their first time in the bottom two
The contestant was eliminated after their second time in the bottom two
The contestant was automatically eliminated by judges
The contestant was eliminated and placed as the runner-up

== Judges ==
- Daphne Deckers (Host)
- Ghislaine Nuytten
- Geert De Wolf
- Bastiaan van Schaik
- Mariana Verkerk

=== Other cast members ===
- Marie-Sophie Steenaert – Make-up Artist
- Jani Kazaltzis – Wardrobe

=== Special guests ===
- Janice Dickinson – Episode 2
- Olcay Gulsen – Episode 2
- Doutzen Kroes – Episode 3
- Victoria Koblenko – Episode 4
- Nigel Barker – Episode 10
