= Topmodel (Belgian TV series) season 2 =

Topmodel
- Season 2
- Season 2's cast
- Starring: An Lemmens; Marc Dochez; Ghislaine Nuytten; Rudi Cremers; Pascale Baelden; Els De Pauw; Ingrid Seynhaeve
- No. of episodes: 10

Release
- Original network: 2BE
- Original release: 9 October – 18 December 2008

Season chronology
- ← Previous; Season 1

The second season of Topmodel aired from October to December 2008 on 2BE. It was presented by An Lemmens. The judging panel consisted of modeling agency Dominique Models head Marc Dochez, former model and head judge Ghislaine Nuytten, make-up artist Rudi Cremers, fashion and beauty journalist and editor-in-chief of Glam*it magazine Pascale Baelden and fashion journalist Els De Pauw. Model Ingrid Seynhaeve, the presenter of the previous season, also mentored the contestants.

The winner of the competition was 19-year-old Virginie Bleyaert from Bruges. Her prizes for winning were a €25,000 contract and an appearance on the January 2009 issue of Glam*it magazine.

== Contestants ==
(ages stated are at start of contest)

Contestant	Age	Height	Hometown	Finish	Place
Maite Valck	17	1.80 m (5 ft 11 in)	Merelbeke	Episode 1	12
Hasse De Meyer	18	1.74 m (5 ft 8 1/2 in)	Beerse	Episode 2	11
Eline Janssen	16	1.82 m (5 ft 11 1/2 in)	Genk	Episode 3	10
Imke Courtois	20	1.76 m (5 ft 9 1/2 in)	Lubbeek	Episode 4	9
Yana Hermans	16	1.80 m (5 ft 11 in)	Ekeren	Episode 6	8–7
Anouchka Muller	16	1.70 m (5 ft 7 in)	Kalmthout	Episode 6	8–7
Stefanie Broes	17	1.76 m (5 ft 9 1/2 in)	Keerbergen	Episode 7	6
Leen Van Belle	16	1.78 m (5 ft 10 in)	Dworp	Episode 8	5
Daisy Olie	17	1.75 m (5 ft 9 in)	Mechelen	Episode 9	4
Barbara Vanden Bussche	19	1.73 m (5 ft 8 in)	Knokke	Episode 10	3–2
Alison Houthuys	16	1.73 m (5 ft 8 in)	Halle	Episode 10	3–2
Virginie Bleyaert	19	1.72 m (5 ft 7 1/2 in)	Bruges	Episode 10	1

== Episodes ==
No. overall	No. in season	Title	Original release date
11	1	"Episode 1"	9 October 2008
300 girls came to the casting. They meet the judges for the first time during a catwalk in bikini on the beach of Lombardsijde. Later, they have an interview with them. After the interview, 12 finalists are chosen. The girls move into a luxurious loft in Brussels. But they don't get much time to settle down there immediately, They meet with Walter van Beirendonck for their first extremely hard challenge, fashion show for Scapa. After the runway, Maite was eliminated.: Special guests: Walter van Beirendonck
12	2	"Episode 2"	16 October 2008
Rudi Cremers came to tell the girls that they have a makeover. He wants to give them a new look, a style that accentuates their natural look. Especially for Alison and Viriginie this is a radical change, but the other girls are also in for a big surprise. Personal trainer Dieter De Bie teaches them that good fitness is very important as a model and immediately tests their endurance. Later, the girls met Pascale Baelden & Ann-Sophie Balsing, who tell them about their first photo shoot as ballet, for Glam*it magazine. At the judging, Hasse was eliminated.: Special guests: Dieter De Bie, Ann-Sophie Balsing
13	3	"Episode 3"	23 October 2008
The girls go to Brussels art academy St-Lucas, to the workshop of art teacher Rudy Bonné. His students are sketching and there is a nude model in the middle. In lingerie, they have to learn to take the same pose for minutes and they have to overcome the hesitation to allow their body to watch them for minutes. Later, they have the next photo shoot where they pose nude. The girls must work together, form one flowing body of bodies and at the same time all give the right look while Els De Pauw closely follows this assignment. Moreover, the models have a difficult catwalk challenge as they walk on floating on a swimming pool while wear bombastic clothes and wigs in front of their family and friends are among the audience. At the judging, Eline was eliminated.: Special guests: Rudy Bonné
14	4	"Episode 4"	30 October 2008
The girls went to Ghent for their next photoshoot in the church, as they became a type of bride. After the photoshoot, they have a workout with Dieter De Bie as they learn that a top model must always look radiant. The next day, the girl meet Geoffrey Enthoven for an acting lesson which that later, they will meet Matthias Temmermans at the VTM studios to record the generics for the program. At the judging, Imke was eliminated.: Special guests: Dieter De Bie, Geoffrey Enthoven, Matthias Temmermans
15	5	"Episode 5"	6 November 2008
Exciting moments come for the 8 remaining models. An Lemmens tells them that three of them are allowed to do castings with some South African designers for the Fashion Week in Cape Town. But Leen, Daisy, Stefanie and Yana are allow to go because they height are 5'9" or more. But because there are only three tickets, Leen is not allowed to go by her competitor. Ingrid Seynhaeve is waiting for Daisy, Yana and Stefanie in Zaventem as she will guide and coach them on Cape Town, while 5 remaining girls staying at home got Elise Crombez will coach them during a glamour shoot with Sean D'hondt from Nailpin in a limousine. Both in Cape Town and Brussels, however, the exuberant atmosphere changes when it appears that two models will be nominated for elimination in each city and that Marc Dochez will decide next week for which two of these four nominees will eliminated. At Brussels, Alison & Anouchka were nominated.: Special guests: Elise Crombez
16	6	"Episode 6"	13 November 2008
The nomination of Alison & Anouchka is hard on the 5 girls staying at home. However, there is not much time to get caught up in it as An Lemmens takes the girls to the European headquarters of a large clothing chain for a casting and fitting for the New Year's brochure awaits them there. Only one of them has a chance to win a spot in the brochure, which will be divided into a circulation of three million copies. Meanwhile in Cape Town, Ingrid Seyhaeve is now presenting her three models to fashion photographer Lambero and they pose with a meerkat in the hands. Later, they go to the safari for an adventurous photo shoot of the middle of savannah. After the photoshoot, Stefanie & Yana were nominated. When the 3 girls went back to Brussels, all 4 nominee facing with Marc Dochez for elimination. At the end, Anouchka & Yana were eliminated.: Featured photographer: Lambero
17	7	"Episode 7"	20 November 2008
In the morning, 6 super-handsome male models arrive at their loft that make they are all impressed. The girls need to get to know them a little better quickly, since they must each choose a boy they can trust blindly in the context of preparing for a photo shoot about the 'Office Romance' theme. But there is also time for relaxation. The boys treat the girls to a nice barbecue. But real kitchen princes are not the least. At the judging, Stefanie was eliminated.
18	8	"Episode 8"	27 November 2008
Photographer Dirk Leunis and coach Elise Crombez take the 5 remaining models to the barely cold location for a nocturnal photo shoot in which the girls have to show feather-light creations as fairies hanging in the air. Their physical abilities are being put to the test because the next day a training session is waiting for them by a few Dirl sergeants from the army. They intend to check who has the most perseverance in character. This is followed by a second photo shoot in extreme circumstances: this time a water tank is the backdrop for a swimwear shoot. Rudi Cremers ensures that the models overcome their fears in front of the lens of photographer Eugeen Verne. After the photoshoot, they found out that only the four best get a ticket to Marrakesh for the semi-final. At the judging, Leen was eliminated.: Special guests: Elise Crombez; Featured photographer: Dirk Leunis, Eugeen Verne
19	9	"Episode 9"	4 December 2008
The 4 remaining girls arrive at Marrakesh where they have to pose for their next photoshoot on the street for Glam*it magazine. Later, they have a shopping challenge that they try to styled a modern outfit for Ingrid Seynhave in the souks. At the judging, Daisy was eliminated.
20	10	"Episode 10"	18 December 2008
The final 3 have their first photo shoot is a cover shoot with photographer Roger Dijckmans for Glam*it. Ingrid Seynhaeve later coaches them for a catwalk as the finalists will have a private fashion show for affluent, international clients of local designer Fadila El Gadi. The next day, they have their last photoshoot on the desert with horse. At the final judging, Virginie became the winner.: Special guests: Fadila El Gadi; Featured photographer: Roger Dijckmans

== Summaries ==
=== Call-out order ===
Order	Episodes								
Order	1 (Note: In Episode 1, only Maite was called, and told she was eliminated.)	2	3	4	6 (Note: In Episode 6, Barbara, Daisy, Leen & Virginie were immune from elimination. Stefanie and Yana were nominated for elimination. Marc Dochez saved Alison and Stefanie, eliminating Anouchka and Yana.)	7	8	9	10
1	Alison; Anouchka; Barbara; Daisy; Eline; Hasse; Imke; Leen; Stefanie; Virginie; Yana	Barbara	Alison	Leen	Daisy	Alison	Virginie	Alison	Virginie
2	Alison; Anouchka; Barbara; Daisy; Eline; Hasse; Imke; Leen; Stefanie; Virginie; Yana	Imke	Stefanie	Virginie	Barbara	Daisy	Barbara	Barbara	Alison; Barbara
3	Alison; Anouchka; Barbara; Daisy; Eline; Hasse; Imke; Leen; Stefanie; Virginie; Yana	Alison	Barbara	Alison	Leen	Leen	Alison	Virginie	Alison; Barbara
4	Alison; Anouchka; Barbara; Daisy; Eline; Hasse; Imke; Leen; Stefanie; Virginie; Yana	Stefanie	Daisy	Daisy	Virginie	Virginie	Daisy	Daisy	
5	Alison; Anouchka; Barbara; Daisy; Eline; Hasse; Imke; Leen; Stefanie; Virginie; Yana	Leen	Virginie	Stefanie	Alison	Barbara	Leen		
6	Alison; Anouchka; Barbara; Daisy; Eline; Hasse; Imke; Leen; Stefanie; Virginie; Yana	Yana	Anouchka	Anouchka	Stefanie	Stefanie			
7	Alison; Anouchka; Barbara; Daisy; Eline; Hasse; Imke; Leen; Stefanie; Virginie; Yana	Daisy	Yana	Barbara	Anouchka; Yana				
8	Alison; Anouchka; Barbara; Daisy; Eline; Hasse; Imke; Leen; Stefanie; Virginie; Yana	Eline	Leen	Yana	Anouchka; Yana				
9	Alison; Anouchka; Barbara; Daisy; Eline; Hasse; Imke; Leen; Stefanie; Virginie; Yana	Anouchka	Imke	Imke					
10	Alison; Anouchka; Barbara; Daisy; Eline; Hasse; Imke; Leen; Stefanie; Virginie; Yana	Virginie	Eline						
11	Alison; Anouchka; Barbara; Daisy; Eline; Hasse; Imke; Leen; Stefanie; Virginie; Yana	Hasse							
12	Maite								

The contestant was eliminated outside of judging panel
The contestant was eliminated
The contestant was immune from elimination
The contestant won the competition

=== Photo shoot guide ===
- Episode 1 photo shoot: Bikini shots (casting)
- Episode 2 photo shoot: Flemish ballerinas
- Episode 3 photo shoot: Nude shots
- Episode 4 photo shoot: Various brides
- Episode 5 photo shoot: Sexy in car with Sean
- Episode 6 photo shoot: Beauty in South Africa
- Episode 7 photo shoot: Showmance
- Episode 8 photo shoot: Tinkerbell in front of cars; underwater nymphs
- Episode 9 photo shoot: Glam*It in Marrakesh
- Episode 10 photo shoots: Vamp on horse; Glam*It covers

== Judges ==
- Marc Dochez
- Ghislaine Nuytten (head judge)
- Rudi Cremers
- Pascale Baelden
- Els De Pauw
