= Holland's Next Top Model season 5 =

Holland's Next Top Model
- Season 5
- Judges: Daphne Deckers; Paul Berends; Bastiaan van Schaik; Mariana Verkerk
- No. of contestants: 15
- Winner: Tamara Weijenberg
- No. of episodes: 11

Release
- Original network: RTL 5
- Original release: 5 September – 14 November 2011

Season chronology
- ← Previous; Cycle 4 Next → Cycle 6

The fifth cycle of Holland's Next Top Model premiered on 5 September 2011 on RTL 5. Producers of the show aired a joint Belgian-Dutch adaptation of the show, named Benelux' Next Top Model, which ran from September 2009 to November 2010 following the show's fourth cycle. In 2011, it was announced that the two countries would be parting ways and the Dutch version would continue under its original title. Three of the five panel members from the last cycle of Benelux' Next Top Model, including host Daphne Deckers, Bastiaan van Schaik, and Mariana Verkerk returned to the newly independent production.

The prizes for this cycle included a modelling contract with Touché Models valued at €75,000, a brand new Lancia Ypsilon, and campaigns for Max Factor and Zalando.

The winner of this year's competition was 19-year-old Tamara Weijenberg from Apeldoorn, Gelderland. Weijenberg currently holds the record for most best performances in the Top Model franchise, with a total of seven best performances.

== Format changes ==
This cycle saw no major changes in contrast with previous cycles save for its larger than usual cast of fifteen contestants, and changes made in the process of choosing the winner during the live finale. The viewer vote was not held for the final episode. Instead, the judges determined the final positions of the four remaining contestants based on their work throughout the competition.

== Cast ==
=== Contestants ===
(Ages stated are at start of contest)

Name	Age	Height	Hometown	Finish	Place
Leontine Sijtsma	19	1.78 m (5 ft 10 in)	Putten	Episode 1	15
Sonja Kester	20	1.82 m (5 ft 11 1/2 in)	Naaldwijk	Episode 1	14
Gésanne Jongman	22	1.73 m (5 ft 8 in)	Groningen	Episode 2	13
Jellena van Mill	20	1.74 m (5 ft 8 1/2 in)	The Hague	Episode 3	12
Jildis Deumens	19	1.75 m (5 ft 9 in)	Nijmegen	Episode 4	11 (quit)
Tirza Tjon Kwan Paw	20	1.75 m (5 ft 9 in)	Amsterdam	Episode 4	10
Claudia van den Driest	18	1.75 m (5 ft 9 in)	Middelburg	Episode 5	9
Roxanne Wassmer	16	1.75 m (5 ft 9 in)	Oss	Episode 6	8
Mandy Engels	21	1.75 m (5 ft 9 in)	Amersfoort	Episode 7	7
Mieke Rozeman	20	1.75 m (5 ft 9 in)	Groningen	Episode 8	6
Nancy Halsema	19	1.72 m (5 ft 7 1/2 in)	Lisse	Episode 9	5
Michelle Zwoferink	20	1.72 m (5 ft 7 1/2 in)	Franeker	Episode 11	4
Riquelle Pals	16	1.75 m (5 ft 9 in)	Gorinchem	Episode 11	3
Elise Winklaar	18	1.74 m (5 ft 8 1/2 in)	Groningen	Episode 11	2
Tamara Slijkhuis	19	1.80 m (5 ft 11 in)	Apeldoorn	Episode 11	1

=== Judges ===
- Daphne Deckers (host)
- Paul Berends
- Bastiaan van Schaik
- Mariana Verkerk

=== Other cast members ===
- Mariëlle Bastiaansen
- Fred van Leer
- Marie-Sophie Steenaert

== Episodes ==
No. overall	No. in season	Title	Original release date
38	1	"Episode 1"	5 September 2011
The final 15 converged in a hangar, where they met host Daphne Deckers for the first time and had their photographs taken in groups by judge Paul Berends while wearing the colors of the Dutch flag. The models were then flown to London, and had a shopping and styling challenge judged by cycle 3 winner Cecile Sinclair, which was won by Tirza. The prize for this challenge was a dinner for two with Cecile, which Tirza chose to share with Tamara. The contestants also faced a second photo shoot with photographer Philip Riches on the London Eye for which Leontine was later eliminated, while Tamara was awarded best photo. Back in Holland, the models shot the cycle's promotional photos. At the end of the week, Sonja was eliminated from the competition.: Special guests: Cecile Sinclair; Featured photographers: Paul Berends, Philip Riches, William Rutten
39	2	"Episode 2"	12 September 2011
The remaining contestants met model Lonneke Engel for a modeling 101 lesson where Mieke made the best impression. As the best performer she was given a time advantage over the other girls during their next challenge, which was a go-see with Freek Koster, the director of the show's winning agency, Touché Models. Elise was chosen as the challenge winner. The models received makeovers, and were visited by Yfke Sturm before taking part in a photo shoot for Zalando where they were strapped to the blades of a windmill. At elimination, Michelle was awarded best photo. Gésanne and Roxanne landed in the bottom two, and Gésanne was eliminated from the competition.: Special guests: Lonneke Engel, Freek Koster, Yfke Sturm; Featured photographer: Allard Honigh
40	3	"Episode 3"	19 September 2011
The contestants styled themselves in preparation for a runway lesson and challenge with judge Mariana Verkerk. After a heated argument in the house Nancy contemplated leaving the competition. On set, the models had their beauty shots taken in a smiling photo shoot for Oral-B. At elimination, Tamara and Riquelle were chosen as the winners of the reward challenge that had taken place earlier in the episode. Tamara was also awarded best photo, and Elise's picture was chosen to front a national campaign for Oral-B. Jellena and Tirza landed in the bottom two, and Jellena was eliminated from the competition.: Special guests: Marvy Rieder; Featured photographer: Hans de Vries
41	4	"Episode 4"	26 September 2011
The contestants had a make-up and styling challenge in which they had to create evening looks for one another. Mandy was chosen as the challenge winner, and received a beauty set from Max Factor. The models were then taken to the Rijksmuseum, and received a lesson in art and fashion history in preparation for their upcoming photo shoot, where they had to pose as 17th century paintings. Riquelle and Tamara trained with J. Alexander in preparation for their debut at Amsterdam Fashion week for having won the previous week's reward challenge. At elimination, Mieke was awarded best photo, and Jildis decided to quit the competition. Nancy and Tirza landed in the bottom two, and Tirza became the sixth contestant to leave.: Special guests: J. Alexander, Sylvia Geersen; Featured photographer: Carin Verbruggen
42	5	"Episode 5"	3 October 2011
The remaining contestants had a yoga lesson, and brushed up on their styling expertise in order to prepare for their next challenge. They were introduced to designer Addy van den Krommenacker, and were fitted for gowns. The best walkers, Michelle and Riquelle, were selected by van den Krommenacker to appear in one of his upcoming shows. On set the models met model Frederique van der Wal, and were photographed with a male model in sultry photo shoot for Bruno Banani. At elimination, Tamara was awarded best photo. Claudia and Mandy landed in the bottom two, and Caludia was eliminated from the competition.: Special guests: Johan Noorloos, Addy van den Krommenacker, Frederique van der Wal; Featured photographer: Alek Bruessing
43	6	"Episode 6"	10 October 2011
The contestants received a training session at the gym. They later met cycle 2 winner Kim Feenstra and Fatima Moreira de Melo for a styling and photo challenge which was won by Elise. The models were then flown to Berlin and were treated to a night out before being taken to the headquarters of Zalando for their next challenge, which involved styling themselves based around different themes for a runway show in front of a crowd of fashion A-listers. Elise, Michelle, and Tamara were chosen as the best performers. After arriving back in the Netherlands, the models had a photo shoot wearing designer gowns for the new Lancia Ypsilon. At elimination, Tamara was awarded best photo. Mandy and Roxanne landed in the bottom two, and Roxanne was eliminated from the competition.: Special guests: Kim Feenstra, Fatima Moreira de Melo, Guillaume Tellers; Featured photographer: Andy Tan
44	7	"Episode 7"	17 October 2011
The remaining seven contestants were flown to Reykjavík, and had a guided tour of the city before taking on an underwater posing challenge in the frigid waters of a nearby river, which had to be postponed after Riquelle was injured. The models later had a go-see challenge at Eskimo Models, where Elise and Tamara were chosen as the winners. They received a €450 gift certificate from Zalando, and a helicopter tour of the city. The next morning the models had an outdoor photo shot where they each had to embody one of the seven continents. At elimination, Tamara was awarded her third consecutive best photo. Mandy and Riquelle landed in the bottom two, and Mandy was eliminated from the competition.: Special guests: Andrea Röfn, Spaks Mannsspjarir
45	8	"Episode 8"	24 October 2011
The contestants received a photography lesson from judge Paul Berends, and were paired off for a challenge in which they had to photograph one another. Nancy was chosen as the challenge winner for having taken the best photos, and received a set of jewelry from Zinzi. They then had a runway challenge at the Harpa concert hall, where Elise and Michelle were chosen as the best performers. Nearing the end of their stay in Iceland, the contestants had a photo shoot in the forest where they had to model designer lenses. At elimination, Tamara was awarded best photo once again, while Mieke, Nancy, and Riquelle landed in the bottom three. Nancy and Riquelle were given another chance, and Mieke was eliminated from the competition.: Special guests: Dick van der Niet; Featured photographer: Paul Berends
46	9	"Episode 9"	31 October 2011
The remaining five models were flown to Ibiza and settled into their new villa, before taking part in a black and white photo shoot challenge on the beach where they had to showcase their natural beauty. They later had an impromptu runway show overseen by Freek Koster, the director of the show's winning agency, Touché Models, and met Paris Hilton during a tent party. Tamara and Michelle were chosen as the winners of the reward challenge that had taken place earlier in the episode. The contestants ended their week with a second photo shoot for Samsung, where they had to pose in the confines of a fridge wearing metallic swimwear. At elimination, Tamara was awarded her seventh best photo in the competition, breaking a record in the Top Model franchise. Nancy and Riquelle landed in the bottom two, and Nancy was eliminated from the competition, leaving Elise, Michelle, Riquelle, and Tamara as the four remaining finalists.: Special guests: Freek Koster, Paris Hilton; Featured photographer: Maria Simon
47	10	"Episode 10"	7 November 2011
The models sat with host Daphne Deckers and reminisced about the events leading up to the final, and the show took a closer look at the day-to-day lives of the four finalists as they prepared for the cycle's live finale. There was also never before seen footage of Michelle and Riquelle walking in Addy van den Krommenacker's show for their challenge win in episode 5.: Special guests: Addy van den Krommenacker, Melissa Baas
48	11	"Episode 11"	14 November 2011
The finalists performed in a series of live runway shows alongside the previously eliminated contestants. The finale also featured performances from Emeli Sandé, Irene van de Laar, and Taio Cruz, and the finalists walked alongside contestants of cycles past. The show went over footage of the models performing in a beauty shoot for Max Factor where they had to pose with a parrot. Elise was chosen as the winner of a commercial for Oxfam Novib that had been shot some time prior. After one last look at each of the finalists' journey throughout the competition, the judges cast their votes in an envelope. The final results were revealed in regressive order as being Michelle, Riquelle, and Elise, with Tamara being crowned as the winner.: Special guests: Freek Koster, Emeli Sandé, Irene van de Laar, Taio Cruz, Kim Feenstra, Ovo Drenth, Sanne Nijhof, Rosalinde Kikstra, Loïs Hoeboer, River Hoeboer, Melissa Baas; Featured director: Martijn Winkeler

== Results ==
Order	Episodes									
Order	1 (Note: In episode 1, there were two separate eliminations. The first took place in London immediately following the London Eye photo shoot. Tamara was awarded best photo, while Sonja and Leontine were singled out as the worst performing contestants, with Leontine being chosen as the first contestant to leave. At the end of the week, the models received a copy of the group photo shoot they had taken at the beginning of the episode, where it was announced that the worst performing model, later revealed to be Sonja, had been photo shopped out of their respective teams group photo.)	2	3	4 (Note: In episode 4, Jildis quit the competition when her name was called at panel.)	5	6	7	8	9	11
1	Tamara	Michelle	Tamara	Mieke	Tamara	Tamara	Tamara	Tamara	Tamara	Tamara
2	Claudia; Elise; Gésanne; Jellena; Jildis; Mandy; Michelle; Mieke; Nancy; Riquelle; Roxanne; Tirza	Jellena	Riquelle	Tamara	Mieke	Michelle	Michelle	Michelle	Michelle	Elise
3	Claudia; Elise; Gésanne; Jellena; Jildis; Mandy; Michelle; Mieke; Nancy; Riquelle; Roxanne; Tirza	Claudia	Elise	Michelle	Michelle	Nancy	Elise	Elise	Elise	Riquelle
4	Claudia; Elise; Gésanne; Jellena; Jildis; Mandy; Michelle; Mieke; Nancy; Riquelle; Roxanne; Tirza	Elise	Nancy	Elise	Roxanne	Riquelle	Mieke	Nancy	Riquelle	Michelle
5	Claudia; Elise; Gésanne; Jellena; Jildis; Mandy; Michelle; Mieke; Nancy; Riquelle; Roxanne; Tirza	Mandy	Mandy	Roxanne	Nancy	Mieke	Nancy	Riquelle	Nancy	
6	Claudia; Elise; Gésanne; Jellena; Jildis; Mandy; Michelle; Mieke; Nancy; Riquelle; Roxanne; Tirza	Mieke	Mieke	Claudia	Elise	Elise	Riquelle	Mieke		
7	Claudia; Elise; Gésanne; Jellena; Jildis; Mandy; Michelle; Mieke; Nancy; Riquelle; Roxanne; Tirza	Nancy	Jildis	Mandy	Riquelle	Mandy	Mandy			
8	Claudia; Elise; Gésanne; Jellena; Jildis; Mandy; Michelle; Mieke; Nancy; Riquelle; Roxanne; Tirza	Riquelle	Roxanne	Jildis	Mandy	Roxanne				
9	Claudia; Elise; Gésanne; Jellena; Jildis; Mandy; Michelle; Mieke; Nancy; Riquelle; Roxanne; Tirza	Tirza	Claudia	Riquelle	Claudia					
10	Claudia; Elise; Gésanne; Jellena; Jildis; Mandy; Michelle; Mieke; Nancy; Riquelle; Roxanne; Tirza	Tamara	Michelle	Nancy						
11	Claudia; Elise; Gésanne; Jellena; Jildis; Mandy; Michelle; Mieke; Nancy; Riquelle; Roxanne; Tirza	Jildis	Tirza	Tirza						
12	Claudia; Elise; Gésanne; Jellena; Jildis; Mandy; Michelle; Mieke; Nancy; Riquelle; Roxanne; Tirza	Roxanne	Jellena							
13	Claudia; Elise; Gésanne; Jellena; Jildis; Mandy; Michelle; Mieke; Nancy; Riquelle; Roxanne; Tirza	Gésanne								
14	Sonja									
15	Leontine									

The contestant was eliminated outside of judging panel
The contestant was eliminated
The contestant was put through collectively to the next round
The contestant quit the competition
The contestant won the competition
