= Topmodel (Belgian TV series) season 1 =

Topmodel
- Season 1
- Starring: Ingrid Seynhaeve; Ghislaine Nuytten; Marc Douchez
- No. of episodes: 10

Release
- Original network: Kanaal Twee
- Original release: October 1 – December 3, 2007

Season chronology
- Next → Season 2

Topmodel, season 1 was the first season of the reality series Topmodel hosted by Ingrid Seynhaeve. Ten contestants lived together in a luxurious apartment until the top three travelled to New York City for the rest of the season.

In contrast to America's Next Top Model, the host was not part of the judging panel. Ghislaine Nuytten was the judging chairwoman and called out the girls onto the next round at the judging panel. The bottom two contestants were then officially nominated for elimination, with Marc Douchez from Dominique Models having the final say on who went home and who stayed.

The winner was Hanne Baekelandt, who won a €25,000 modeling contract for management and representation by Dominique Models, a campaign for L'Oréal cosmetics, and the cover on Glam*It magazine.

== Contestants ==
(ages stated are at start of contest)

Contestant	Age	Height	Hometown	Finish	Place
Jessie Colman	22	1.70 m (5 ft 7 in)	Ghent	Episode 3	10
An Voorhoof	22	1.83 m (6 ft 0 in)	Drongen	Episode 4	9
Tess Gonnissen	17	1.76 m (5 ft 9 1/2 in)	Bevel	Episode 5	8
Elisa Guarraci	16	1.72 m (5 ft 7 1/2 in)	Genk	Episode 6	7–6
Kelly Van den Kerchove	21	1.70 m (5 ft 7 in)	Ostend	Episode 6	7–6
Eveline Dewinter	17	1.79 m (5 ft 10 1/2 in)	Vlierzele	Episode 7	5
Michèle Vanhooren	17	1.74 m (5 ft 8 1/2 in)	Brussels	Episode 8	4
Valérie Debeerst	17	1.75 m (5 ft 9 in)	Sint-Pieters	Episode 10	3–2
Ine Nijs	18	1.74 m (5 ft 8 1/2 in)	Hasselt	Episode 10	3–2
Hanne Baekelandt	20	1.70 m (5 ft 7 in)	Sint-Amandsberg	Episode 10	1

== Summaries ==
=== Call-out order ===
Order	Episodes							
Order	2 (Note: Episodes 1 and 2 were the casting episodes.)	3	4	5	6 (Note: In Episode 6 Michèle, Hanne, Kelly and Elisa were nominated for elimination. In the end, Marc decided to save Michèle and Hanne, eliminating Elisa and Kelly.)	7	8	10
1	Ine	Ine	Elisa	Eveline	Ine	Michèle	Ine	Hanne
2	Tess	An	Michèle	Hanne	Valérie	Ine	Hanne	Ine; Valérie
3	Eveline	Michèle	Tess	Ine	Eveline	Valérie	Valérie	Ine; Valérie
4	Jessie	Hanne	Eveline	Valérie	Michèle	Hanne	Michèle	
5	Hanne	Elisa	Kelly	Elisa	Hanne	Eveline		
6	Michèle	Kelly	Hanne	Michèle	Elisa; Kelly			
7	Elisa	Eveline	Ine	Kelly	Elisa; Kelly			
8	Kelly	Valérie	Valérie	Tess				
9	An	Tess	An					
10	Valérie	Jessie						

The contestant was eliminated
The contestant won the competition

== Judges ==
- Ghislaine Nuytten (Head judge)
- Lieve Gerrits
- Marc Dochez
- Vasko Todorof

=== Coaches ===
- Aza Declercq (actress & presenter)
- Elise Crombez (top model)
- Ingrid Seynhaeve (top model)
- Monique Vanendert (photographer)
