= Belgium's Next Top Model season 1 =

Model contest on television

Belgium's Next Top Model
- Season 1
- Judges: Hannelore Knuts (host); Tom Eerebout; Tom Van Dorpe; Inge Onsea
- No. of contestants: 14
- Winner: Gilles Verbruggen
- No. of episodes: 10

Release
- Original network: Streamz
- Original release: 15 September – 10 November 2023

Season chronology
- Next → Season 2

The first season of Belgium's Next Top Model, a reboot series of Topmodel, was first aired September 15, 2023. This is the first season of the show to feature male contestants.

The winner of the competition was 19-year-old Gilles Verbruggen from Wetteren. He won a modeling contract with NOAH Mgmt and a cover shoot for the fashion magazine Marie Claire.

== Contestants ==
(ages stated are at start of contest)

Contestant	Age	Hometown	Finish	Place
Zahra Berger	20	Antwerp	Episode 2	14-13
Emilia Laforce	21	Antwerp	Episode 2	14-13
Amba Egard	18	Antwerp	Episode 3	12
Gia Robles	22	Antwerp	Episode 4	11
Andres Deley	19	Ostend	Episode 5	10
Sam Baps	23	Hasselt	Episode 7	9-7
Marson Look	24	Bree	Episode 7	9-7
Gilles Mornae	20	Aalst	Episode 7	9-7
Lena Rombaut	24	Ghent	Episode 8	6
Sieme Hermans	24	Antwerp	Episode 9	5
Radja Ndabaneze	24	Antwerp	Episode 10	4
Fardowza Aden	20	Kortrijk	Episode 10	3
Tessa van Syngel	17	Merelbeke	Episode 10	2
Gilles Verbruggen	19	Wetteren	Episode 10	1

== Episodes ==
No. overall	No. in season	Title	Original release date
1	1	"Episode 1"	15 September 2023
Out of thousands of applications, 20 Semi-Finalists were selected to compete to become 'Belgium's Next Top Model'. In the Havenhuis in Antwerp, one of the most iconic buildings of Flanders, the models experienced there first shoot which would determine who would move in the Final 14.: Immune: Fardowza Aden, Sam Baps, Sieme Hermans & Radja Ndabaneze; Eliminated Semi-Finalists: Dylan Kiala, Jules Maes, Karen Jansen, Naomi Woldu, Seppe Vanthorre & Thara Monteleone; Special guests:
2	2	"Episode 2"	15 September 2023
The models arrive to the salon to receive their makeovers, after which they are tasked to show off their looks in a high fashion photo shoot: First callout: Marson Look; Bottom three: Emilia Laforce, Radja Ndabaneze & Zhara Berger; Eliminated: Emilia Laforce & Zarah Berger; Special guests:
3	3	"Episode 3"	22 September 2023
The models had their first challenge and it consisted out of two tasks, involving the two prizes of this season: the contract with nOAH management and the cover of Marie Claire. First, they do interviews with the editors in chief of Marie Claire Belgium and then they do a quick 30 seconds introduction video for the agency, in English.: Challenge winners: Radjabu Ndabaneze & Sieme Hermans; First callout: Gia Robles & Lena Rambaut; Bottom four: Gilles Mornae, Gilles Verbruggen, Sieme Hermans & Amba Egard; Eliminated: Amba Egard; Special guests: Julius Poole
4	4	"Episode 4"	29 September 2023
At this week's shoot, contestants are empowered to show both femininity and masculine energy, in a genderfluid concept.: Challenge winners: First callout: Fardowza Aden; Bottom four: Andres Deley, Gia Robles, Radja Ndabaneze & Sieme Hermans; Eliminated: Gia Robles; Special guests:
5	5	"Episode 5"	6 October 2023
Challenge winners: First callout: Sam Baps; Bottom four: Andres Deley, Gilles Verbruggen, Lena Rambaut & Tessa van Syngel; Eliminated: Andres Deley; Special guests:
6	6	"Episode 6"	13 October 2023
Challenge winners: First callout: Group 1 (Lena Rambaut, Gilles Mornae & Tessa van Syngel); Bottom two: Radja Ndabaneze & Sam Baps; Eliminated: None; Special guests:
7	7	"Episode 7"	20 October 2023
Challenge winners: First callout: Tessa van Syngel; Bottom four: Fardowza Aden, Gilles Mornae, Marson Look & Sam Baps; Eliminated: Gilles Mornae, Marson Look & Sam Baps; Special guests:
8	8	"Episode 8"	27 October 2023
Challenge winners: First callout: Gilles Verbruggen; Bottom two: Lena Rambaut & Tessa van Syngel; Eliminated: Lena Rambaut; Special guests:
9	9	"Episode 9"	3 November 2023
Challenge winners: First callout: Tessa van Syngel; Bottom two: Fardowza Aden & Sieme Hermans; Eliminated: Sieme Hermans; Special guests:

== Summaries ==
=== Call-out order ===
Order	Episodes									
Order	1	2	3	4	5	6	7	8	9	10
1	Fardowza	Marson	Gia; Lena	Fardowza	Sam	Gilles M. Lena; Tessa	Tessa	Gilles V.	Tessa	Gilles V.
2	Sam	Tessa	Gia; Lena	Gilles V.	Gilles M.	Gilles M. Lena; Tessa	Radja	Radja	Radja	Tessa
3	Sieme	Lena	Radja; Tessa	Lena	Fardowza	Gilles M. Lena; Tessa	Sieme	Fardowza	Gilles V.	Fardowza
4	Radja	Sam	Radja; Tessa	Marson	Radja	Fardowza; Gilles V. Marson; Sieme	Gilles V.	Sieme	Fardowza	Radja
5	Amba	Gia	Andres; Sam	Gilles M.	Sieme	Fardowza; Gilles V. Marson; Sieme	Lena	Tessa	Sieme	
6	Gia	Gilles M.	Andres; Sam	Tessa	Marson	Fardowza; Gilles V. Marson; Sieme	Fardowza	Lena		
7	Tessa	Gilles V.	Fardowza; Marson	Sam	Tessa	Fardowza; Gilles V. Marson; Sieme	Gilles M. Marson; Sam			
8	Gilles M.	Sieme	Fardowza; Marson	Radja	Gilles V.	Radja; Sam	Gilles M. Marson; Sam			
9	Zahra	Amba	Gilles V. Sieme	Sieme	Lena	Radja; Sam	Gilles M. Marson; Sam			
10	Andres	Fardowza	Gilles V. Sieme	Andres	Andres					
11	Gilles V.	Andres	Gilles M.	Gia						
12	Emilia	Radja	Amba							
13	Marson	Emilia; Zahra								
14	Lena	Emilia; Zahra								

The contestant was immune from elimination
The contestant was in a non-elimination bottom two
The contestant was eliminated
The contestant won the competition

=== Photo shoot guide ===
- Episode 1 photo shoot: Denim (casting)
- Episode 2 photo shoot: Opening credits & makeover
- Episode 3 photo shoot: Fashion shoot in pairs
- Episode 4 photo shoot: Genderfluid
- Episode 5 photo shoot: Horror house
- Episode 6 photo shoot: Antwerp Fashion Academy campaign
- Episode 7 photo shoot: Friends & family
- Episode 8 video shoot: B/W commercial at a resort
- Episode 9 photo shoot: Underwater
- Episode 10 photo shoot: Marie Claire cover tries
