= BNTM =

BNTM may refer to:

- Britain's Next Top Model
- Brazil's Next Top Model
- Benelux' Next Top Model
