= Benelux' Next Top Model season 2 =

Benelux' Next Top Model
- Season 2
- No. of episodes: 10

Release
- Original network: 2BE, RTL 5
- Original release: September 13 – November 16, 2010

Season chronology
- ← Previous; Season 1

Benelux' Next Top Model, Season 2 was the second and last season of Benelux' Next Top Model which include Dutch and Flemish contestants. It premiered on September 13 and was aired until November 16, 2010. Although castings for a third season of the show were announced, the show returned as Holland's Next Top Model, the title it had prior the merge with the Belgian Topmodel version of the show.

The winner of the competition was 18-year-old Melissa Baas from IJsselstein. Not only was she the second girl from the Netherlands to win the competition; the entire top three (Baas, Renée Trompert and Alix Schoonheijt) were from this country.

== Contestants ==
(ages stated are at start of contest)

Name	Age	Hometown	Outcome	Place
Jacqueline Sorbie	17	Antwerp, Belgium	Episode 1	12
Lisse Habraken	21	Mol, Belgium	Episode 2	11
Daisy Koller	16	Loenen, Netherlands	Episode 3	10
Lesley van Helden	18	Dordrecht, Netherlands	Episode 4	9
Epiphany Vanderhaeghen	21	Asse, Belgium	Episode 5	8
Aïcha Cissé	23	Antwerp, Belgium	Episode 6	7
Frederieke Bonn	20	Boxtel, Netherlands	Episode 7	6
Jaelle Leclerc	21	Brussels, Belgium	Episode 8	5
Marjolein De Velder	20	Kobbegem, Belgium	Episode 9	4
Alix Schoonheijt	16	Zutphen, Netherlands	Episode 9	3
Renée Trompert	22	Leeuwarden, Netherlands	Episode 9	2
Melissa Baas	18	IJsselstein, Netherlands	Episode 9	1

== Summaries ==
Order	Episodes											
Order	1 (Note: In episode 1, the pool of 16 girls was reduced to the final 12. Each girl was handed an envelope, with only the final 11's envelopes containing train tickets.)		2	3	4	5	6 (Note: In episode 6, Aïcha, Yaële and Marjolein were called forward as the bottom three. Daphne handed the last two photos to Marjolein and Yaële, eliminating Aïcha.)	7	8	9		
1	Epiphany	—	Aïcha	Alix	Aïcha	Jaelle	Melissa	Marjolein	Renée	Alix	Melissa	Melissa
2	Renée	—	Renée	Marjolein	Frederieke	Alix	Frederieke	Melissa	Melissa	Melissa	Renée	Renée
3	Marjolein	—	Daisy	Melissa	Marjolein	Frederieke	Renée	Jaelle	Marjolein	Renée	Alix	
4	Melissa	—	Marjolein	Renée	Melissa	Melissa	Alix	Renée	Alix	Marjolein		
5	Aïcha	—	Melissa	Aïcha	Renee	Renée	Jaelle	Alix	Jaelle			
6	Lisse	—	Jaelle	Epiphany	Epiphany	Aïcha	Marjolein	Frederieke				
7	Jacqueline	—	Lesley	Frederieke	Jaelle	Marjolein	Aïcha					
8	Frederieke	—	Frederieke	Lesley	Alix	Epiphany						
9	Daisy	—	Alix	Jaelle	Lesley							
10	Jaelle	—	Epiphany	Daisy								
11	Alix	—	Lisse									
12	Lesley	Jacqueline										

The contestant was eliminated
The contestant was immune from elimination
The contestant won the competition

=== Photo shoot guide ===
- Episode 1 photo shoot: Body painting promo photos
- Episode 2 photo shoot: Circus
- Episode 3 photo shoot: Oil of Olaz
- Episode 4 photo shoot: Meat packing industry
- Episode 5 photo shoot: Gold body painting with sunglasses
- Episode 6 photo shoot: Icy in bikinis
- Episode 7 photo shoot: Posing underwater
- Episode 8 photo shoot: Bruno Banani perfume

== Judges ==
- Daphne Deckers (Host)
- Geert De Wolf
- Bastiaan van Schaik
- Mariana Verkerk
- Jani Kazaltzis

=== Other cast members ===
- Marie-Sophie Steenaert - Make-up Artist
- Mariëlle Bastiaansen - Hair Stylist

=== Special guests ===
- Heidi Klum (Episode 1)
