= Showmance (disambiguation) =

Showmance may refer to:

- Showmance, a romance, often contrived, that develops between two individuals in theater, or on films and television series and reality shows for the running period of the show
- "Showmance" (Glee), second episode of the American television series Glee
- "Showmance", Episode 7 photoshoot on Topmodel, Cycle 2
