= Holland's Next Top Model season 4 =

Holland's Next Top Model
- Season 4
- Judges: Daphne Deckers; Rosalie van Breemen; Hilmar Mulder; Philip Riches; Mariana Verkerk
- No. of contestants: 13
- Winner: Ananda Lândertine
- No. of episodes: 10

Release
- Original network: RTL 5
- Original release: 31 March – 2 June 2008

Season chronology
- ← Previous; Cycle 3 Next → Cycle 5

The fourth cycle of Holland's Next Top Model premiered on 31 March 2008 on RTL 5. This was the second cycle of the series to be hosted by Dutch model Daphne Deckers. All of the previous season's judges returned for the new cycle, with the exception of Glamour magazine editor Karin Swerink, who was replaced by Grazia magazine editor Hilmar Mulder.

The prizes for this cycle included a modelling contract with Modelmasters The Agency valued at €75,000, a cover feature for Grazia magazine, replacing the sponsorship of the show's previous magazine, Glamour, a four-month contract to be the new face of the ICI Paris XL beauty channel, and a brand new Citroën sponsored by ICI Paris XL.

The winner of the competition was 19-year-old Ananda Lândertine from Wormer, North Holland.

Following the conclusion of this cycle, production began on a joint Dutch-Belgian adaptation of the show, which was titled Benelux' Next Top Model. After a two-year run, production for Holland's Next Top Model resumed in 2011 with a fifth cycle.

== Cast ==
=== Contestants ===
(Ages stated are at start of contest)

Contestant	Age	Height	Hometown	Finish	Place
Franca Nieuwenhuys	22	—N/a	Rotterdam	Episode 1	13–12
Anna Esajan	21	—N/a	Zwolle	Episode 1	13–12
Joosje de Grave	16	1.76 m (5 ft 9 1/2 in)	Leiden	Episode 2	11 (quit)
Laura Gerot	21	1.77 m (5 ft 9 1/2 in)	Groningen	Episode 2	10
Daniëlle Marcus	20	1.79 m (5 ft 10 1/2 in)	Zwijndrecht	Episode 3	9
Claudia Stegeman	22	1.83 m (6 ft 0 in)	Emst	Episode 4	8
Victoria Rerikh	19	1.81 m (5 ft 11 1/2 in)	Amstelveen	Episode 5	7
Annika Schippers	17	1.76 m (5 ft 9 1/2 in)	Arnhem	Episode 6	6
Maj-Britt Zantkuijl	19	1.76 m (5 ft 9 1/2 in)	Blaricum	Episode 7	5
Patricia van der Vliet	18	1.79 m (5 ft 10 1/2 in)	Zaandam	Episode 10	4
Jennifer Melchers	19	1.77 m (5 ft 9 1/2 in)	Alkmaar	Episode 10	3
Yvette Broch	17	1.83 m (6 ft 0 in)	Monster	Episode 10	2
Ananda Marchildon	21	1.80 m (5 ft 11 in)	Wormer	Episode 10	1

=== Judges ===
- Daphne Deckers (host)
- Rosalie van Breemen
- Hilmar Mulder
- Philip Riches
- Mariana Verkerk

=== Other cast members ===
- Bastiaan van Schaik - mentor
- Thijs Willekes - mentor

== Episodes ==
No. overall	No. in season	Title	Original release date
28	1	"Episode 1"	31 March 2008
The semi-finalists arrived at the Radisson Blu Palace Hotel for casting week, where the judges chose the final 11 contestants. The finalists moved into the model home, and later had a simplistic photo shoot at the house with judge and photographer Philip Riches. They were shocked to learn that previously eliminated semi-finalists Maj-Britt and Yvette would be joining them as finalists, effectively replacing two of the original 11 contestants. At the end of the week the models received a visit from the judges, and it was revealed that Anna and Franca would not be continuing on in the competition.: Special guests: Anneriet van Schaijk; Featured photographer: Philip Riches
29	2	"Episode 2"	7 April 2008
The contestants received a visit from model Vanessa Hessler for a modeling crash course, and were later introduced to drag personality Diva MayDay for a challenge in which they had to channel their emotions and perform fits of hysteria in a public square. The winner of the challenge was Annika, who was rewarded with a river ride for two which she chose to share with Ananda. On set, the models were coached by Vanessa Hessler as they had their promotional photographs taken. They then received makeovers, during which Joosje decided to quit the competition. At elimination, Annika and Laura landed in the bottom two, and Laura became the fourth contestant to leave the competition.: Special guests: Vanessa Hessler, Diva MayDay; Featured photographer: Nick van Ormondt
30	3	"Episode 3"	14 April 2008
The models received a makeup lesson from mentor Thijs Willekes, and were later taken to the headquarters of the Modelmasters agency to receive tips on proper attire for go-sees. They also had a two part challenge which consisted of a photo shoot with nude male models, and a mock fitness commercial. Ananda was deemed to be the best performer in the shoot, while Maj-Britt was chosen as the best performer during the commercial. Their prize was a visit to ICI Paris XL complete with a gift basket from the shop. On set, the contestants shot a campaign featuring the new Mexx fragrances, Nice and Wild. At elimination, Annika and Daniëlle landed in the bottom two. Annika was given another chance, and Daniëlle was asked to leave the competition.: Special guests: Anneriet van Schaijk, Erik Anthierens, Stéphane Andrieu; Featured photographer: Jeroen Mantel
31	4	"Episode 4"	21 April 2008
The remaining eight models were taken to the airport for a runway lesson with judge Mariana Verkerk, and later put their knowledge to the test in a runway challenge at the docks where they had to walk while holding sea creatures. Maj-Britt was chosen as the challenge winner, and was rewarded with a spa session for two back at the house, which she chose to share with Jennifer. The contestants also received Brazilian waxes in preparation for their upcoming photo shoot, which had them posing at an ice bar while wearing bikinis in a campaign for UGG. At elimination, Claudia and Maj-Britt landed in the bottom two, with Claudia becoming the sixth contestant to leave the competition.: Featured photographer: Philip Riches
32	5	"Episode 5"	28 April 2008
The models received an acting lesson from acting coach Hugo Metsers, and later received a surprise visit from cycle 2 winner Kim Feenstra and cycle 3 finalist Kassandra Schreuder for a girls night out. The following day they shot a biker-themed commercial challenge featuring hairspray, in which Patricia was deemed to be the best performer. As her prize, she received a set of Guess Swiss Made Watches and a first class limousine ride, which she chose to share with Ananda. After a set of mock interviews, the models took part in a photo shoot where they had to portray different bride stereotypes. At elimination, Victoria and Yvette landed in the bottom two. Yvette was given another chance, and Victoria was eliminated from the competition.: Special guests: Hugo Metsers, Kassandra Schreuder, Kim Feenstra; Featured photographer: Paul de Graaf
33	6	"Episode 6"	4 May 2008
The contestants received a visit from judge Rosalie van Breemen for one on one conversations. They following day they were treated to a visit at the sauna, which turned out to be a surprise fitness session. They later had a risqué lingerie runway challenge in which they had to exude their sex appeal, with an audience consisting of their friends and family members. Ananda was chosen as the challenge winner, and was invited to a Paul Schulten show in Amsterdam along with a friend of her choosing. After receiving a second set of makeovers, the models were photographed in a campaign for Guess watches, where they had to pose as three-dimensional paintings. At elimination, Annika became the eighth contestant to leave the competition, and Daphne revealed that the remainder of the competition would be taking place in Ko Samui, Thailand.: Special guests: Lars Schuijling; Featured photographer: Dale Grant
34	7	"Episode 7"	12 May 2008
The models arrived in Thailand, and moved into the Four Seasons Hotel in Ko Samui. The following day they visited a Buddhist temple for meditation, before being put through their paces in a rigorous fitness challenge on the beach. They were later taken to the Cha Weng Stadium to watch a boxing match, and learned that they would be going on stage to put a show on for the public. Jennifer, Yvette, and Maj-Britt were chosen to spend a night out with the judges for their good performances. For the photo shoot, they were photographed outdoors by photographer Allard Honigh in a campaign for designer sunglasses. At elimination, Maj-Britt and Patricia landed in the bottom two, and Maj-Britt became the next contestant to leave the competition.: Special guests: Dick van der Niet; Featured photographer: Allard Honigh
35	8	"Episode 8"	19 May 2008
The models were taken on an elephant ride through the jungle, and were coached by judge and photographer Philip Riches in preparation for the final photo shoot as they posed with the elephants. They later had a traditional dance lesson with instructor Tomyoman Kalothai, before being flown to Bangkok for a special interview dinner with several designers, where Ananda made the best impression. Back in Ko Samui, the contestants were photographed on the beach wearing gowns as they jumped in the air. At elimination, Jennifer and Yvette landed in the bottom two. Daphne revealed that both of them would be allowed to stay, and that all four of the contestants would be competing in the live final.: Special guests: Tomyoman Kalothai, Chamnan Pakdeesuk, Rai von Bueren, Ellen Boonstra; Featured photographer: Philip Riches
36	9	"Episode 9"	26 May 2008
This episode focused on the day-to-day lives of the four finalists as they were visited by the judges and prepared for the cycle's live finale. The voting lines for each of the four models opened during this episode, and remained open until the following week. At the end of episode, it remained unclear whether Patricia would be able to participate in the final due to her hospitalization from Crohn's disease.: Special guests: T.H Goei
37	10	"Episode 10"	2 June 2008
The contestants performed in a series of live challenges, and the show went over footage of the models performing in a beauty shoot for ICI Paris XL, with the final photos being onstage. After a brief set of interviews from family members and a series of runway performances, Daphne Deckers revealed the three finalists who would be moving on to the next stage of the competition. Patricia was eliminated for having the fewest votes from the public. At the end of the night the judges scored the remaining models on a scale from one to ten, and after adding the public vote to the judge's vote, Ananda was revealed to be the winner of the competition.: Special guests: Anneriet van Schaijk

== Results ==
Order	Episodes										
Order	1 (Note: At the end of episode 1 it was announced that Maj-Britt and Yvette, who had been initially eliminated in the first half of the episode as semi-finalists, would be replacing the two worst-performing contestants from that week's photo shoot. Anna and Franca were eliminated, and the former two took their place in the competition.)		2 (Note: In episode 2, Joosje quit the competition.)	3	4	5	6 (Note: In episode 6, the contestants were called forward, then given their verdict. Annika was called fourth and told she was eliminated. Daphne then handed Jennifer and Maj-Britt their photos.)	7	8	10 (Note: During the first round of the live final, the viewer vote determined the contestants who would advance into the final three. Patricia received the fewest votes overall, and was the first contestant to be eliminated. For the second round of the live final, each of the judges was allowed to vote for one of the three remaining models. The weight of each individual vote was ten points, with a possible total of 50 points. These totals were then tallied with the percentages of the viewer vote among the remaining three contestants, which counted for half of the overall total. Ananda accumulated the most points at the end of the night, and was crowned the winner.)	
1	Anna	Ananda; Annika; Claudia; Daniëlle; Jennifer; Joosje; Laura; Patricia; Victoria	Maj-Britt	Claudia	Annika	Patricia	Ananda	Jennifer	Ananda	Jennifer	Ananda
2	Franca	Ananda; Annika; Claudia; Daniëlle; Jennifer; Joosje; Laura; Patricia; Victoria	Claudia	Jennifer	Victoria	Maj-Britt	Patricia	Ananda	Patricia	Ananda	Yvette
3	Laura	Ananda; Annika; Claudia; Daniëlle; Jennifer; Joosje; Laura; Patricia; Victoria	Victoria	Ananda	Patricia	Ananda	Yvette	Yvette	Jennifer; Yvette	Yvette	Jennifer
4	Victoria	Ananda; Annika; Claudia; Daniëlle; Jennifer; Joosje; Laura; Patricia; Victoria	Yvette	Victoria	Jennifer	Annika	Annika	Patricia	Jennifer; Yvette	Patricia	
5	Patricia	Ananda; Annika; Claudia; Daniëlle; Jennifer; Joosje; Laura; Patricia; Victoria	Patricia	Maj-Britt	Yvette	Jennifer	Jennifer; Maj-Britt	Maj-Britt			
6	Joosje	Ananda; Annika; Claudia; Daniëlle; Jennifer; Joosje; Laura; Patricia; Victoria	Ananda	Patricia	Ananda	Yvette	Jennifer; Maj-Britt				
7	Jennifer	Ananda; Annika; Claudia; Daniëlle; Jennifer; Joosje; Laura; Patricia; Victoria	Jennifer	Yvette	Maj-Britt	Victoria					
8	Claudia	Ananda; Annika; Claudia; Daniëlle; Jennifer; Joosje; Laura; Patricia; Victoria	Daniëlle	Annika	Claudia						
9	Annika	Ananda; Annika; Claudia; Daniëlle; Jennifer; Joosje; Laura; Patricia; Victoria	Annika	Daniëlle							
10	Ananda; Daniëlle	Anna; Franca	Laura								
11	Ananda; Daniëlle	Anna; Franca	Joosje								

The contestant was eliminated outside of judging panel
The contestant was put through collectively to the next round
The contestant quit the competition
The contestant was eliminated
The contestant was part of a non-elimination bottom two
The contestant won the competition

=== Final scores ===
Place	Final scores			
Place	Contestant	Judge's vote	Viewer vote	Total score
1	Ananda	40 points	10 points (20%)	50 points
2	Yvette	10 points	19 points (38%)	29 points
3	Jennifer	0 points	21 points (42%)	21 points
