= Holland's Next Top Model season 6 =

Holland's Next Top Model
- Season 6
- Judges: Anouk Smulders; Sabine Geurten; Sharon Mor Yosef
- No. of contestants: 13
- Winner: Nikki Steigenga
- No. of episodes: 9

Release
- Original network: RTL 5
- Original release: 26 August – 22 October 2013

Season chronology
- ← Previous; Cycle 5 Next → Cycle 7

The sixth cycle of Holland's Next Top Model (subtitled as Holland's Next Top Model Goes Europe) premiered on 26 August 2013 on RTL 5. This was the first cycle of the series to be hosted by former model Anouk Smulders, replacing the show's previous host Daphne Deckers after three cycles. The judging panel was completely revamped as well, and featured no returning judges from any of the previous five cycles. The new vacancies on the judging panel were filled by editor-in-chief of Glamour magazine, Sabine Geurten, and fashion photographer Sharon Mor Yosef. Stylist Fred van Leer remained in place as a mentor for the contestants.

The prizes for this cycle included a modelling contract with Touché Models valued at €50,000, an additional contract with Next Model Management in London, a cover feature for Glamour magazine, a brand new car, and a paid business trip to Majorca to work with photographers and build a professional portfolio.

The winner of the competition was 18-year-old Nikki Steigenga from Rotterdam, South Holland.

== Format changes ==
The new cycle incorporated several new changes to the show's format. In contrast to previous cycles, the contestants were housed in reduced accommodations, with the best performing models of each episode being granted access to a separate apartment from the losing contestants. This cycle also introduced a more randomized process of elimination without a linear call-out.

In addition to the 12 contestants chosen by the judges, the show also held a separate wildcard contest sponsored by Sizz to choose an additional 13th contestant. Daelorian van der Kolk and Michélle Wiegman were eventually chosen from a shortlist of applicants to participate in the filming of the show's opening sequence and promotional photo shoot, though neither was featured in the cycle's first episode, and their identities remained unknown to the other contestants. Van der Kolk was chosen as the 13th finalist in episode 2.

This cycle placed a focus on developing models who could work internationally, and most of the filming took place outside of the Netherlands. The contestants were taken to several European cities, namely Copenhagen, Milan, Como, and London, in order to attend castings and meet various high-profile clients. This was meant to imitate the real experiences faced by international models working abroad.

== Cast ==
=== Contestants ===
(Ages stated are at start of contest)

Name	Age	Height	Hometown	Finish	Place
Cheyenne van Altena	18	1.76 m (5 ft 9 1/2 in)	Rotterdam	Episode 1	13
Sharon Pieksma	18	1.78 m (5 ft 10 in)	Rotterdam	Episode 2	12
Rosalie Boekholt	19	1.75 m (5 ft 9 in)	Almere	Episode 3	11
Milou van den Bosch	18	1.80 m (5 ft 11 in)	Bergschenhoek	Episode 4	10–9
Demy Ben Yanes	17	1.75 m (5 ft 9 in)	Amsterdam	Episode 4	10–9
Soraya Schipper	23	1.78 m (5 ft 10 in)	Vlaardingen	Episode 5	8
Lotte Keijser	18	1.77 m (5 ft 9 1/2 in)	Katwijk	Episode 6	7
Kelsey Hendrix	18	1.75 m (5 ft 9 in)	Lent	Episode 7	6
Baldijntje Klip	20	1.82 m (5 ft 11 1/2 in)	Streefkerk	Episode 8	5
Daelorian van der Kolk	16	1.70 m (5 ft 7 in)	Amersfoort	Episode 9	4
Bo Kossen	18	1.75 m (5 ft 9 in)	Schagen	Episode 9	3
Anke Jabroer	21	1.79 m (5 ft 10 1/2 in)	Heerhugowaard	Episode 9	2
Nikki Steigenga	18	1.77 m (5 ft 9 1/2 in)	Rotterdam	Episode 9	1

=== Judges ===
- Anouk Smulders (host)
- Sabine Geurten
- Sharon Mor Yosef

=== Other cast members ===
- Fred van Leer

== Episodes ==
No. overall	No. in season	Title	Original release date
49	1	"Episode 1"	26 August 2013
The judges auditioned aspiring contestants at a mass-casting in Amsterdam, and later chose the final 12 contestants. The finalists met at two separate locations in groups of six, based on the nature of the makeovers they would receive at the Rob Peetoom salon. They later moved into their new apartment, and had a simplistic photo shoot on the beach with judge and photographer Sharon Mor Yosef, where Bo was deemed to be the best performer. After shooting the show's opening sequence, Anouk announced that the contestants would be travelling to Copenhagen, but that only 11 of them would board the plane. At elimination, Sharon and Cheyenne landed in the bottom two, and Cheyenne became first contestant to leave the competition.: Special guests: Rob Peetoom; Featured photographer: Sharon Mor Yosef
50	2	"Episode 2"	2 September 2013
The contestants arrived in Copenhagen, and learned that the best-performing contestants from the filming of the opening in the previous episode, Anke, Bo, Demy, Lotte, and Soraya, would enjoy access to a more spacious apartment for the duration of the week, and live separately from the cramped living quarters shared by the rest of the models. They then learned that the show had conducted a search for an additional finalist, Daelorian, and that she would be joining the competition. After a casting challenge with Unique Models, in which Daelorian was chosen as the winner, the models had a photo shoot with photographer Anders Brogaard for a cell-phone campaign where they had to descend a vertical runway. At elimination, Bo, Daelorian, Kelsey, Lotte, and Nikki were chosen as the best performers, winning a place at the Basic-Plus apartment for the following week. Milou and Sharon landed in the bottom two, and Sharon was eliminated from the competition.: Special guests: Jacqueline Friis Mikkelsen; Featured photographer: Anders Brogaard
51	3	"Episode 3"	2 September 2013
The models were taken to an amusement park for a runway challenge with model Sarah Grunewald, and had a makeup challenge with Paul Benjamin which was won by Rosalie. They later attended castings for Copenhagen Fashion Week, where Soraya was chosen to walk in a show for Baum und Pferdgarten's S/S 14 collection. They were later photographed on an escalator in a campaign for Specsavers, where they had to embody the essence of different fashion capitals. At elimination, Anouk announced that the ten remaining models at the end of the ceremony would be flown to Milan. Anke, Baldijntje, Bo, Kelsey, and Nikki were chosen as the best performers, winning a place at the Basic-Plus apartment. Milou and Rosalie landed in the bottom two, and Rosalie became the third contestant to leave the competition.: Special guests: Sarah Grünwald, Paul Benjamin; Featured photographer: Sean McMenomy
52	4	"Episode 4"	9 September 2011
The contestants arrived in Milan, and were taken to the Piazza del Duomo, where they met cycle 2 winner Kim Feenstra for a styling lesson. They were taken to the offices of Joy Model Management for a go see, where Bo, Nikki and Soraya made the best impression, and attended a casting with Giuseppe Ceccarelli where Bo and Soraya were chosen as the winners. They later had an editorial photo shoot for Glamour in front of the Milan Cathedral in winter fashion, and it was revealed that judge Sabine Geurten would publish the best eight photos in a spread for the magazine. At elimination, Bo, Daelorian, Lotte and Nikki were chosen as the best performers, winning a place at the Basic-Plus apartment. Anke, Demy and Milou landed in the bottom three, with the latter two leaving the competition in a double elimination.: Special guests: Kim Feenstra, Paolo Tomei, Giuseppe Ceccarelli, Paul Benjamin; Featured photographer: Jouke Bos
53	5	"Episode 5"	16 September 2013
The contestants met Fred van Leer at Terrazzo Martini for a high-end styling lesson. They were later taken to Como, where they were photographed topless in a Denim campaign for Replay with male model Andrea Del Corso overlooking Lake Como. After arriving back in Milan, the models attended a party at the Cavalli Club. They also had a timed makeup challenge, which was won by Anke, Bo, and Daelorian. At elimination, Bo, Kelsey, and Soraya landed in the bottom three, and Soraya became the sixth contestant to leave the competition.: Special guests: Andrea Del Corso; Featured photographer: Stefano Oppo
54	6	"Episode 6"	23 September 2013
The final six contestants were flown to London, and found out that they'd be sharing one apartment for the remainder of the competition. They were later taken to the countryside for a runway challenge wearing designs by Fhernando Colunga, where Anke was chosen as the winner. The next morning the models were taken to Next Model Management and met director Amanda Bretherton, who selected Bo for a casting with photographer Simon Harris. For the photo shoot, the models had to pose inside a pond in an ad campaign for Colgate Whitening Gel. At elimination, it was revealed that the winner of the competition would be given an additional contract with Next Model Management in London. Anke was deemed to be the best performer at the shoot, and was selected to front a national campaign for Colgate. Kelsey and Lotte landed in the bottom two, and Lotte was eliminated from the competition.: Special guests: Fhernando Colunga, Christopher Daley, Amanda Bretherton; Featured photographer: Gunnar Tufta
55	7	"Episode 7"	30 September 2013
Bo attended her casting with Simon Harris, and the models had a sightseeing photo shoot on board a double decker tour bus wearing designer labels. They later met judge Sabine Greuten and celebrity stylist Angie Smith at a fashion warehouse, and were asked to create mood boards and select outfits that reflected their sense of fashion. After completing their looks with lenses from Specsavers, Nikki was chosen as the winner for having the best overall look. At elimination, Anouk announced that only three of the remaining six contestants would be advancing directly to the live finale, and that the fourth spot would be left to a public vote. Baldijntje, Daelorian, and Kelsey landed in the bottom three. Kelsey was eliminated, while Baldijntje and Daelorian's fates were left up for the viewers to decide.: Special guests: Simon Harris, Ozzy Shah, Frédérique Olthuis, Angie Smith, Vicky Atkinson; Featured photographer: Billie Scheepers
56	8	"Episode 8"	7 October 2013
The episode recapped the contestants' journey up to the selection of the final five, and went over never before seen footage of Anke, Bo, and Nikki walking in Amsterdam Fashion Week. Nikki walked for an additional show in Copenhagen Fashion Week after having received a callback for one of the castings that took place earlier on in the competition. At the end of the episode, it was revealed that the viewers had chosen Daelorian as the fourth finalist, and Baldijntje became the ninth contestant to leave the competition.
57	9	"Episode 9"	14 October 2013
The show featured live performances from various artists, including Sharon Doorson, while the finalists took part in a series of themed runway shows. The show went over footage of the final four taking part in a ballroom couture photo shoot with photographer Dirk Kikstra, as well as an editorial photo shoot with judge Sharon Mor Yosef. The results for the finalists' Glamour cover shoot were shown, and cycle 5 winner Tamara Weijenberg made an appearance for the final runway. After one last look at each of the finalists' journey throughout the competition, the judges cast their votes in an envelope. The final results were revealed in regressive order as being Daelorian, Bo, and Anke, with Nikki being crowned as the winner.: Special guests: Sharon Doorson, Krystl, Freek Koster, Bo Saris, Tamara Weijenberg; Featured photographer: Dirk Kikstra, Sharon Mor Yosef

== Results ==
Order	Episodes									
Order	1 (Note: The beginning of episode 1 saw the judges visit each of the twelve finalists in their hometowns to tell them they had made it into the competition.) (Note: In episode 1, the safe contestants were declared safe in no particular order. It was revealed which contestants would stay in the Basic-Plus apartment the following episode.)		2 (Note: In episode 2, Daelorian entered the competition as a result of having won the Sizz Wildcard contest.) (Note: In episodes 2 to 6, the contestants were called forward individually in no particular order and told whether they were safe or in danger of elimination.)	3	4	5	6	7 (Note: In episode 7, Bo, Anke and Nikki advanced to the final. The following episode, it was announced that Daelorian had been chosen by the public as the fourth finalist.)	8	9
1	Bo	Bo	Bo	Lotte	Bo	Nikki	Bo	Bo	Anke	Nikki
2	Nikki	Baldijntje	Anke	Bo	Daelorian	Lotte	Nikki	Anke	Bo	Anke
3	Lotte	Soraya	Nikki	Anke	Soraya	Anke	Baldijntje	Nikki	Nikki	Bo
4	Kelsey	Anke	Lotte	Soraya	Lotte	Daelorian	Anke	Daelorian	Daelorian	Daelorian
5	Sharon	Kelsey	Soraya	Baldijntje	Kelsey	Baldijntje	Daelorian	Baldijntje	Baldijntje	
6	Demy	Lotte	Daelorian	Nikki	Nikki	Bo	Kelsey	Kelsey		
7	Milou	Demy	Baldijntje	Daelorian	Baldijntje	Kelsey	Lotte			
8	Cheyenne	Nikki	Kelsey	Kelsey	Anke	Soraya				
9	Baldijntje	Rosalie	Demy	Demy	Demy					
10	Rosalie	Milou	Rosalie	Milou	Milou					
11	Anke	Sharon	Milou	Rosalie						
12	Soraya	Cheyenne	Sharon							

The contestant was in the top five/four of the week and won a place in the Basic-Plus apartment/the contestant won best photo
The contestant was eliminated
The contestant was immune from elimination
The contestant won the competition
