= Ananda Marchildon =

Canadian-Dutch fashion model

- Born: November 26, 1986 (age 39); Canada
- Modeling information
- Height: 5 ft 11 in (1.80 m)
- Hair color: Blonde (brown naturally)
- Eye color: Green
- Agency: MTA Models

Ananda Marchildon (also known as Ananda Lândertine; born November 26, 1986) is a Canadian-Dutch fashion model most notable as the winner of the fourth cycle of Holland's Next Top Model.

== Prior to HNTM ==
Marchildon was born and raised in Canada and moved to the Netherlands when she was 10 years old. When she was in her early twenties she started to occupy abandoned buildings, due to resistance to her parents. On a TV show and in certain news papers Marchildon was described as a former drug addict. This statement was not true, however, she did use soft drugs in her squatter period, which is legal in the Netherlands. Another untrue media hype is that she got professional help at a rehab center to get off the drugs. Marchildon never did go to a rehab because she decided to stop smoking pot herself.

== Holland's Next Top Model, Cycle 4 ==
Marchildon competed against ten other contestants to win Cycle 4 of Holland's Next Top Model. She was selected as one of the finalists to enter the 'Top Model mansion'. Half of the judging panel often criticized her performances and personality as being 'too insecure' and 'closed'.

Although she is naturally a brunette, Marchildon was dyed blonde for her third makeover on the show.

== Career ==
Before her appearance on the show, Marchildon did some modeling work.

As part of the prize package awarded to her, Marchildon received a €75,000 contract with ModelMasters The Agency. She was also to appear on the cover of Grazia magazine, and, for four months, to be the new face of the ICI PARIS XL Beauty Channel and she won a Citroën sponsored by ICI PARIS XL. She was also part of the final runway show in Cycle 11 of America's Next Top Model.

However, when ModelMasters The Agency was acquired by the New York-based modeling agency Elite Model Management, they canceled the contract with Marchildon, giving as reason that she was too fat for modeling, after having paid only €10,000 of the contractually agreed €75,000. Marchildon sued, and won.

As of 2012, she stopped modeling.
