= Yvette Broch =

Dutch handball player (born 1990)

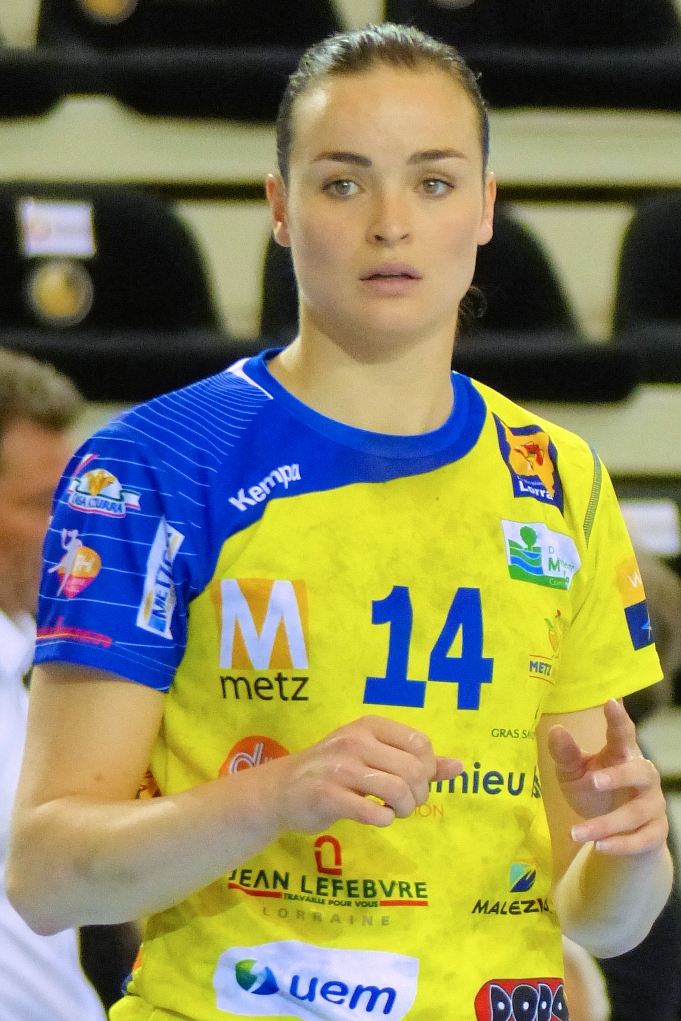

Personal information
- Nationality: Dutch
- Born: 23 December 1990 (age 35) Monster, Netherlands
- Height: 1.84 m (6 ft 0 in)

Sport
- Sport: Handball
- Position: Pivot
- Current club: retired

Senior clubs
- Years: Team
- 2006–2008: Van der Voort/Quintus
- 2009–2010: VOC Amsterdam
- 2010–2011: BM Alcobendas
- 2011–2015: Metz Handball
- 2015–2018: Győri ETO KC
- 2020–2021: Metz Handball
- 2021–2022: CSM București
- 2022–2024: Győri ETO KC
- 2026: Brest Bretagne Handball
National team
Years	Team	Apps	(Gls)
2010–2024	Netherlands	118	(303)
Medal record
World Championship
Silver medal – second place	2015 Denmark
Bronze medal – third place	2017 Germany
European Championship
Silver medal – second place	2016 Sweden

Yvette Petraki (née Broch, born 23 December 1990) is a retired Dutch professional handball player, who last played for Brest Bretagne Handball and the Dutch national team. She is also known for being a runner up on the fourth season of Holland's Next Top Model.

She completed in the 2011 World Women's Handball Championship in Brazil. She competed on the Dutch team at the 2014 European Women's Handball Championship in Hungary and Croatia, and won a silver team medal at the 2015 World Championship finals. She competed at the 2016 Summer Olympics in the women's handball tournament.

In August 2018 she decided to suspend her professional handball career, due to exhaustion. In 2020, she returned to handball and trained with her former French handball club, Metz. After the season, she signed a 2-year contract with the Romanian club, CSM Bucuresti. After one season she returned to her former Hungarian handball club, Győri Audi ETO KC. She signed a 2-year contract.

== Achievements ==
National team

- World Championship:
  - Silver Medalist: 2015
  - Bronze Medalist: 2017
- European Championship:
  - Silver Medalist: 2016

European competitions

- EHF Champions League:
  - Winner: 2017, 2018, 2024
  - Finalist: 2016
- EHF Cup:
  - Finalist: 2013

Domestic competitions

- Romanian Cup:
  - Winner: 2022
- Romanian Supercup:
  - Finalist: 2021
- Nemzeti Bajnokság I
  - Gold Medalist: 2016, 2017, 2018, 2023
- Magyar Kupa
  - Gold Medalist: 2016, 2018
  - Silver Medalist: 2017, 2023, 2024
- French Championship
  - Gold Medalist: 2013, 2014, 2026
  - Silver Medalist: 2015
- Coupe de France
  - Gold Medalist: 2013

== Individual awards ==
- Best Defender of the 2022 Romanian Cup
- French Championship Best Pivot: 2015
- All Star Pivot of the European Championship: 2016
- All Star Pivot of the 2017 World Championship
