= Belgium's Next Top Model season 2 =

Model contest on television

Belgium's Next Top Model
- Season 2
- Judges: Hannelore Knuts (host); Tom Eerebout; Tom Van Dorpe; Inge Onsea
- No. of contestants: 14
- Winner: Bréseïs Simons
- No. of episodes: 10

Release
- Original network: Streamz
- Original release: 5 July – 6 September 2024

Season chronology
- ← Previous; Season 1

The second season of Belgium's Next Top Model, was first aired July 5, 2024. This is the second season of the show to feature male contestants.

The winner of the competition was 19-year-old Bréseïs Simons from Ghent.

== Contestants ==
Ages stated are as of the beginning of the contest

Contestant	Age	Hometown	Finish	Place
Jesse Vansteenkiste	20	Drongen	Episode 2	14-13
Caro Baens	28	Antwerp	Episode 2	14-13
Davina Vercruysse	20	Martenslinde	Episode 3	12
Lode Meynendonckx	17	Antwerp	Episode 4	11
Lisa Dauwe	20	Sint-Truiden	Episode 5	10
Aisha van Raemdonck	18	Schoten	Episode 6	9
Zeno de Meyer	19	Hemiksem	Episode 7	8-7
Paulien Martens	22	Brussels	Episode 7	8-7
Marie Malec	21	Kessel-Lo	Episode 9	6
Babette Roelandt	22	Lede	Episode 9	5
Oran Vanderweyden	19	Tremelo	Episode 10	4
Ivar Robinne	19	Orp-Jauche	Episode 10	3
Aissata Sanou	21	Antwerp	Episode 10	2
Bréseïs Simons	19	Ghent	Episode 10	1

== Episodes ==
No. overall	No. in season	Title	Original release date
11	1	"Episode 1"	5 July 2024
12	2	"Episode 2"	12 July 2024
13	3	"Episode 3"	19 July 2024
14	4	"Episode 4"	26 July 2024
15	5	"Episode 5"	2 August 2024
16	6	"Episode 6"	9 August 2024
17	7	"Episode 7"	16 August 2024
18	8	"Episode 8"	23 August 2024
19	9	"Episode 9"	30 August 2024
20	10	"Episode 10"	6 September 2024

== Summaries ==
=== Call-out order ===
Order	Episodes									
Order	1 (Note: In episode 1, Aissata, Lode, Paulien & Zeno entered the competition after judging. Furthermore, Aisha received immunity for the following week.)	2	3	4	5	6	7	8	9	10
1	Aisha; Ivar	Aisha; Aissata; Lode; Zeno	Aissata; Oran	Aissata	Bréseïs	Marie	Babette	Bréseïs	Oran	Bréseïs
2	Aisha; Ivar	Aisha; Aissata; Lode; Zeno	Aissata; Oran	Aisha; Babette; Ivar; Marie; Oran; Paulien; Zeno	Babette	Ivar	Ivar	Ivar	Aissata	Aissata
3	Babette; Bréseïs; Caro; Davina; Jesse; Lisa; Marie; Oran	Aisha; Aissata; Lode; Zeno	Marie; Zeno	Aisha; Babette; Ivar; Marie; Oran; Paulien; Zeno	Zeno	Bréseïs	Aissata	Aissata	Ivar	Ivar
4	Babette; Bréseïs; Caro; Davina; Jesse; Lisa; Marie; Oran	Aisha; Aissata; Lode; Zeno	Marie; Zeno	Aisha; Babette; Ivar; Marie; Oran; Paulien; Zeno	Paulien	Aissata	Bréseïs	Oran	Bréseïs	Oran
5	Babette; Bréseïs; Caro; Davina; Jesse; Lisa; Marie; Oran	Paulien	Ivar; Paulien	Aisha; Babette; Ivar; Marie; Oran; Paulien; Zeno	Aissata	Oran	Marie	Marie	Babette	
6	Babette; Bréseïs; Caro; Davina; Jesse; Lisa; Marie; Oran	Davina	Ivar; Paulien	Aisha; Babette; Ivar; Marie; Oran; Paulien; Zeno	Oran	Zeno	Oran	Babette	Marie	
7	Babette; Bréseïs; Caro; Davina; Jesse; Lisa; Marie; Oran	Oran	Bréseïs; Lode	Aisha; Babette; Ivar; Marie; Oran; Paulien; Zeno	Ivar	Paulien	Paulien; Zeno			
8	Babette; Bréseïs; Caro; Davina; Jesse; Lisa; Marie; Oran	Bréseïs	Bréseïs; Lode	Aisha; Babette; Ivar; Marie; Oran; Paulien; Zeno	Marie	Babette	Paulien; Zeno			
9	Babette; Bréseïs; Caro; Davina; Jesse; Lisa; Marie; Oran	Lisa	Aisha; Lisa	Bréseïs	Aisha	Aisha				
10	Babette; Bréseïs; Caro; Davina; Jesse; Lisa; Marie; Oran	Ivar	Aisha; Lisa	Lisa	Lisa					
11	Aissata; Lode; Paulien; Zeno	Babette	Babette	Lode						
12	Aissata; Lode; Paulien; Zeno	Marie	Davina							
13	Aissata; Lode; Paulien; Zeno	Caro; Jesse								
14	Aissata; Lode; Paulien; Zeno	Caro; Jesse								

The contestant was immune from elimination
The contestant was eliminated
The contestant entered the competition
The contestant won the competition

=== Photo shoot guide ===
- Episode 1 photo shoot: Posing in the air for Kaai Bags
- Episode 2 photo shoot: Opening credits & makeover
- Episode 3 photo shoot: Suspended artistic shoot in pairs
- Episode 4 photo shoot: Lingerie
- Episode 5 photo shoot: Jewelry with bugs and snakes
- Episode 6 photo shoot: Posing in denims for Guess
- Episode 7 photo shoot: B&W with their love ones
- Episode 8 video shoot: Wild movements for Essentiel Antwerp & Komono
- Episode 9 photo shoot: Swimsuit in Costa Brava
- Episode 10 photo shoot: L'Officiel magazine cover & editorials
