= Nicky Opheij =

Dutch model

- Born: 7 June 1995 (age 31); Utrecht, Netherlands
- Modeling information
- Height: 1.80 m (5 ft 11 in)
- Hair color: Brown
- Eye color: Blue
- Agency: Touché Models

Nicky Opheij is a Dutch model. She is the winner of the 7th season of Holland's Next Top Model.

In 2017, Opheij was crowned Miss Netherlands.
