= Rosalinde Kikstra =

Dutch model

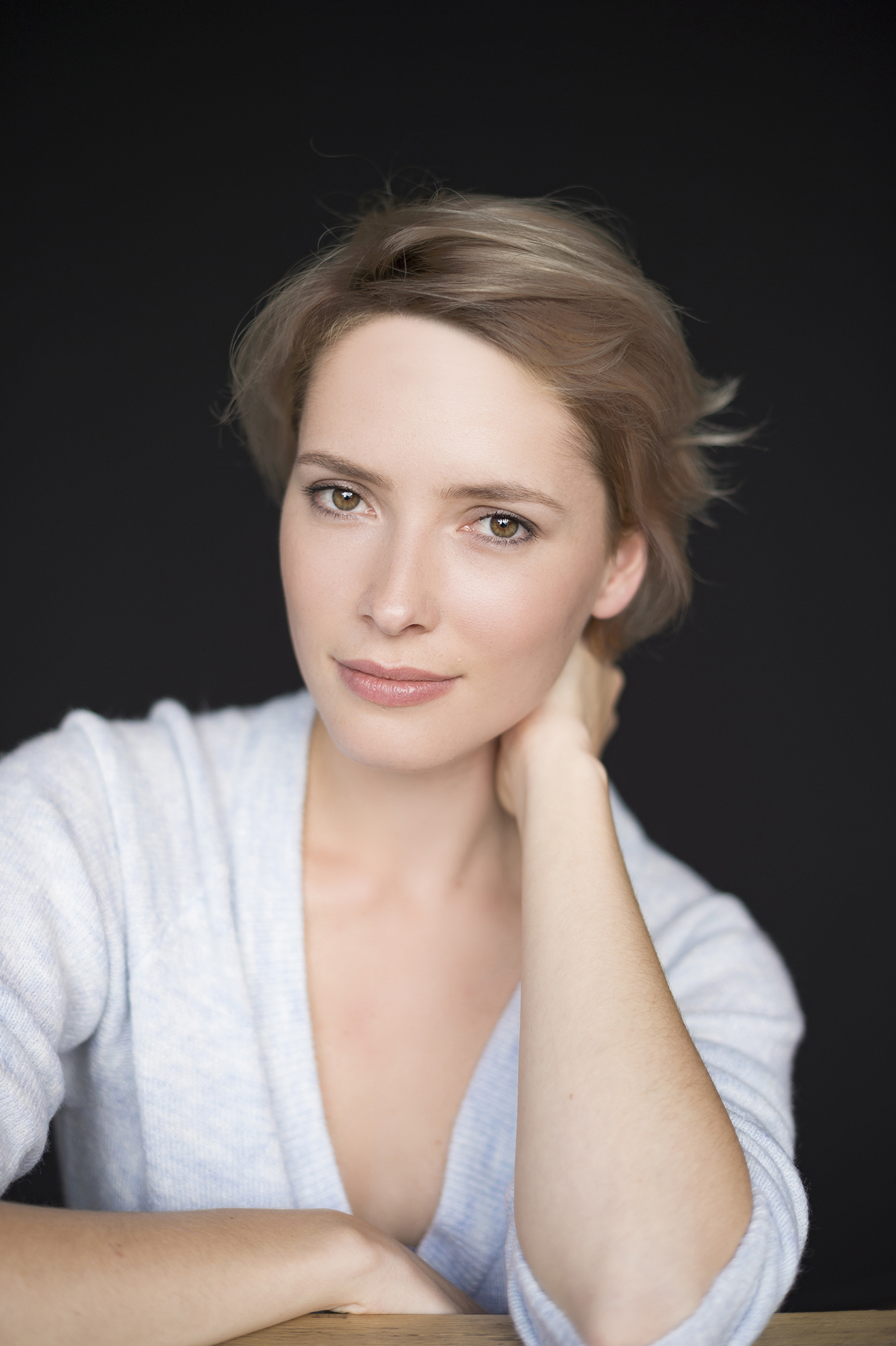
- Born: Rosalinde Kikstra; 7 September 1987 (age 39); Rotterdam, Netherlands
- Modeling information
- Height: 5 ft 11.3 in (1.81 m)
- Hair color: Dark blonde
- Eye color: Brown
- Agency: MTA Models

Rosalinde Kikstra (born 7 September 1987) is a Dutch fashion model, and the winner of Benelux' Next Top Model, Cycle 1.

== Benelux' Next Top Model ==
At the semi-finals, Rosalinde was the seventh girl called to join the final thirteen competing for Benelux' Next Top Model, Cycle 1. Throughout the competition, she had been called first one time, being widely considered as a natural beauty and photogenic by the judges. She also received praise for her consistent photos and chameleon portfolio. She struggled with expressing herself in front of the judges, and landed in the bottom two for the first (and only) time before the live finale, but survived against fellow competitor Lianne Bakker. At the final live show, she was chosen by three out of the five judges as Benelux' Next Top Model.

== Career ==
=== Agency Affiliation ===
Rosalinde is signed with MTA Models in Amsterdam.

=== Runway ===
She has walked in a C&A fashion show.

=== Print Work ===
Kikstra appeared in a spread for Gillette Venus. Rosalinde won a spread in Beau Monde, as part of her BNTM prize package.
