= Belgium's Next Top Model =

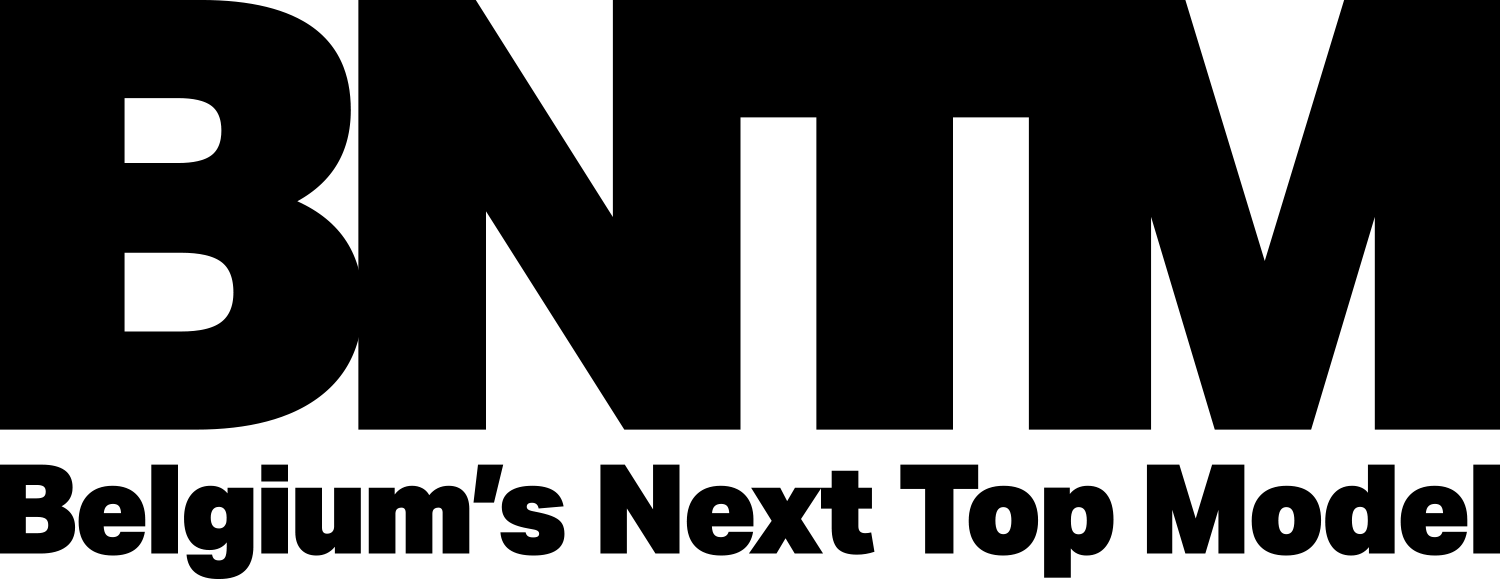
- Created by: Tyra Banks
- Starring: Hannelore Knuts
- Judges: Hannelore Knuts; Tom Erebout; Tom van Dorpe; Inge Onsea
- Country of origin: Belgium
- Original language: Dutch
- No. of seasons: 2
- No. of episodes: 20

Original release
- Network: Streamz
- Release: 15 September 2023 – present

Belgium's Next Top Model is the reality television series based on Tyra Banks' America's Next Top Model that pits contestants from Belgium against each other in a variety of photoshoots and runways to determine who will win the title of Belgium's Next Top Model.

== Cycles ==
Cycle	Premiere date	Winner	Runner-up	Other contestants in order of elimination	Number of contestants	International destinations
1	15 September 2023	Gilles Verbruggen	Tessa van Syngel	Zahra Berger & Emilia Laforce, Amba Egard, Gia Robles, Andres Deley, Sam Baps & Marson Look & Gilles Mornae, Lena Rombaut, Sieme Hermans, Radja Ndabaneze, Fardowza Aden	14	None
2	5 July 2024	Bréseïs Simons	Aissata Sanou	Jesse Vansteenkiste & Caro Baens, Davina Vercruysse, Lode Meynendonckx, Lisa Dauwe, Aisha van Raemdonck, Zeno de Meyer & Paulien Martens, Marie Malec & Babette Roelandt, Oran Vanderweyden, Ivar Robinne	14	Costa Brava
