= Patricia van der Vliet =

Dutch fashion model (born 1989)

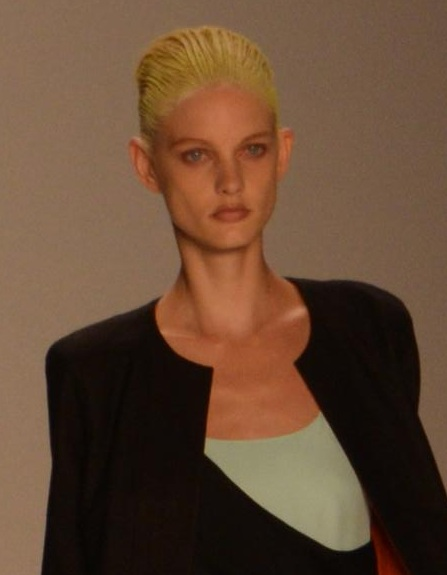
- Born: Patricia van der Vliet; 14 July 1989 (age 37); Zaandam, North Holland, Netherlands
- Years active: 2008–present
- Modeling information
- Height: 5 ft 10.5 in (1.79 m)
- Hair color: Blonde
- Eye color: Blue
- Agency: Ford Models (New York)

Patricia van der Vliet (born 14 July 1989) is a Dutch fashion model and real estate salesperson. She competed on the fourth cycle of the reality television series Holland's Next Top Model, where she placed fourth.

== Biography ==
=== Early life ===
Van der Vliet was born in Zaandam, North Holland. Prior to auditioning for Holland's Next Top Model, she worked as a salesperson and a junior college student assistant.

=== Holland's Next Top Model ===
Van der Vliet competed against ten other contestants and came fourth in cycle 4 of Holland's Next Top Model. Just a day before the live finale of the fourth cycle, it was confirmed that van der Vliet would be a finalist, after being in the hospital, suffering from Crohn's disease. The Dutch viewers could vote for their favorite model during two weeks before the finale, but people were unsure if van der Vliet would be a finalist, so they did not vote for her. In the live show, van der Vliet was eliminated, due to having the fewest votes of the viewers among the other finalists.

=== Career ===
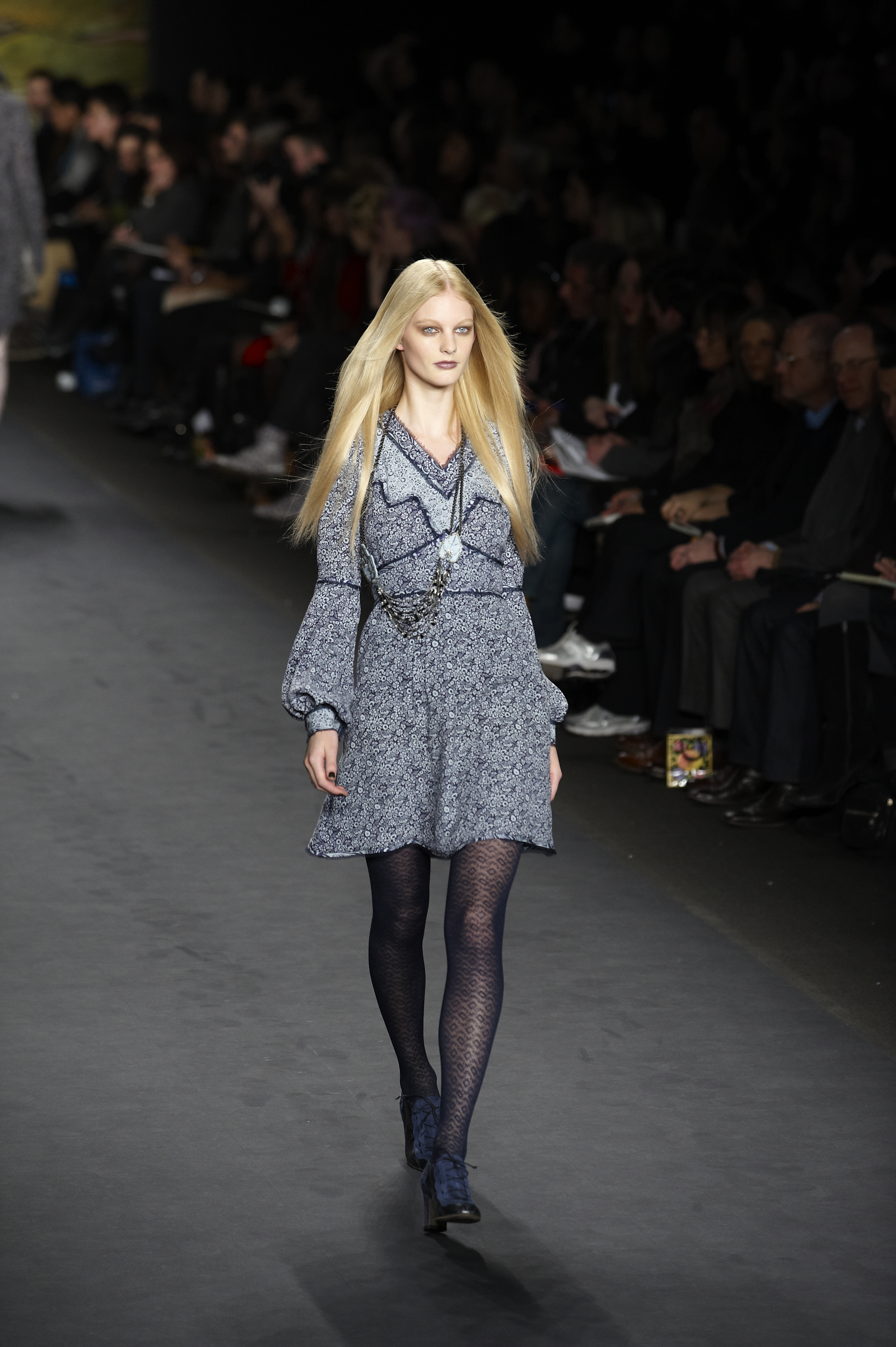
van der Vliet for Anna Sui FW 2010.

She is signed with Elite Model Management & IBTM Models in Amsterdam, Munich Models in Munich, Action Management in Athens, Oui Management in Paris, Sight Management Studio in Barcelona, Le Management in Copenhagen, Modelwerk in Hamburg, MP Stockholm in Stockholm, Vivien's Model Management in Sydney, METRO Models in Zurich, The Society Management & Women Management 360 in New York City, Union Models & The Hive Management in London and Elite Model Management in Copenhagen, Toronto, Paris and Milan. She used to be signed with Nathalie Agency in Paris and Why Not Model Agency in Milan.

She made her runway debut during Spring/Summer 2010 shows in New York, Milan, and Paris. She walked for Celine, Dries van Noten, Herve Leger, Karl Lagerfeld, Kenzo, Loewe, Nina Ricci, Sonia Rykiel, Sophia Kokosalaki, Valentino and Yves Saint Laurent. She opened Louis Vuitton and BCBG Max Azria and she closed Balenciaga, Preen and Giles Deacon. She is also the first Top Model contestant to walk for Prada, which she was an exclusive for.

Shortly after her runway debut, style.com and models.com named van der Vliet one of the top 10 newcomers that season. After her successful debut, she appeared in editorials for a lot of blue chip magazines, including Numéro, Interview, W, Allure, French Elle, and Italian, Japanese, British, Chinese, Russian, German, and American Vogue.

She appeared in campaigns for Balenciaga, Burberry, Sonia Rykiel, H&M and Nicole Farhi and lookbooks for Alexander McQueen and Bergdorf Goodman. She also walked for the S/S 10 Couture show of Givenchy and the F/W 10 and S/S 11 Couture show of Valentino.

For the Fall 2010 season, she walked a total of 50 shows, including Balenciaga, Prada, Chanel, Louis Vuitton, Hermès, Marc Jacobs, Givenchy, Dolce & Gabbana and Valentino.

van der Vliet was ranked 29th on the international model ranking website models.com, a first for any Top Model contestant.

Spring 2011 was another great show season for her, walking in a total of 46 high-profile shows, including Chanel, Balenciaga, Yves Saint Laurent, Calvin Klein, Alexander McQueen, Givenchy, Dolce & Gabbana and many more. Despite being sick, Fall 2011 was another great season for her, walking in 31 high-profile shows such as Givenchy, Calvin Klein, Dolce & Gabbana, Burberry Prorsum, Valentino, Alexander McQueen, Giorgio Armani and Chanel.

In August 2010, van der Vliet appeared on her first Vogue cover for Vogue Beauty, Nippon (Japan). She also appeared on the cover of the November 2010 issue of Vogue China, alongside American supermodel Karlie Kloss, making it her second Vogue cover. In April 2011 she appeared on the cover of Vogue Nippon Isetan Mania, the supplement cover of Vogue Nippon.

She also appeared on the cover of the January 2011 edition of Elle France and the Spring/Summer 2011 cover of Grey Magazine, shot by Ellen Von Unwerth, following in the footsteps of the likes of Karolina Kurkova, Constance Jablonski, Hannelore Knuts and Karlie Kloss.

In October 2015, van der Vliet was ranked by Cosmopolitan as one of the most successful contestants of the Top Model franchise.

As in 2024, she is currently signed with Ford Models in New York City while working as a real estate salesperson for SERHANT. Real Estate.
