= Ingrid Seynhaeve =

Belgian model

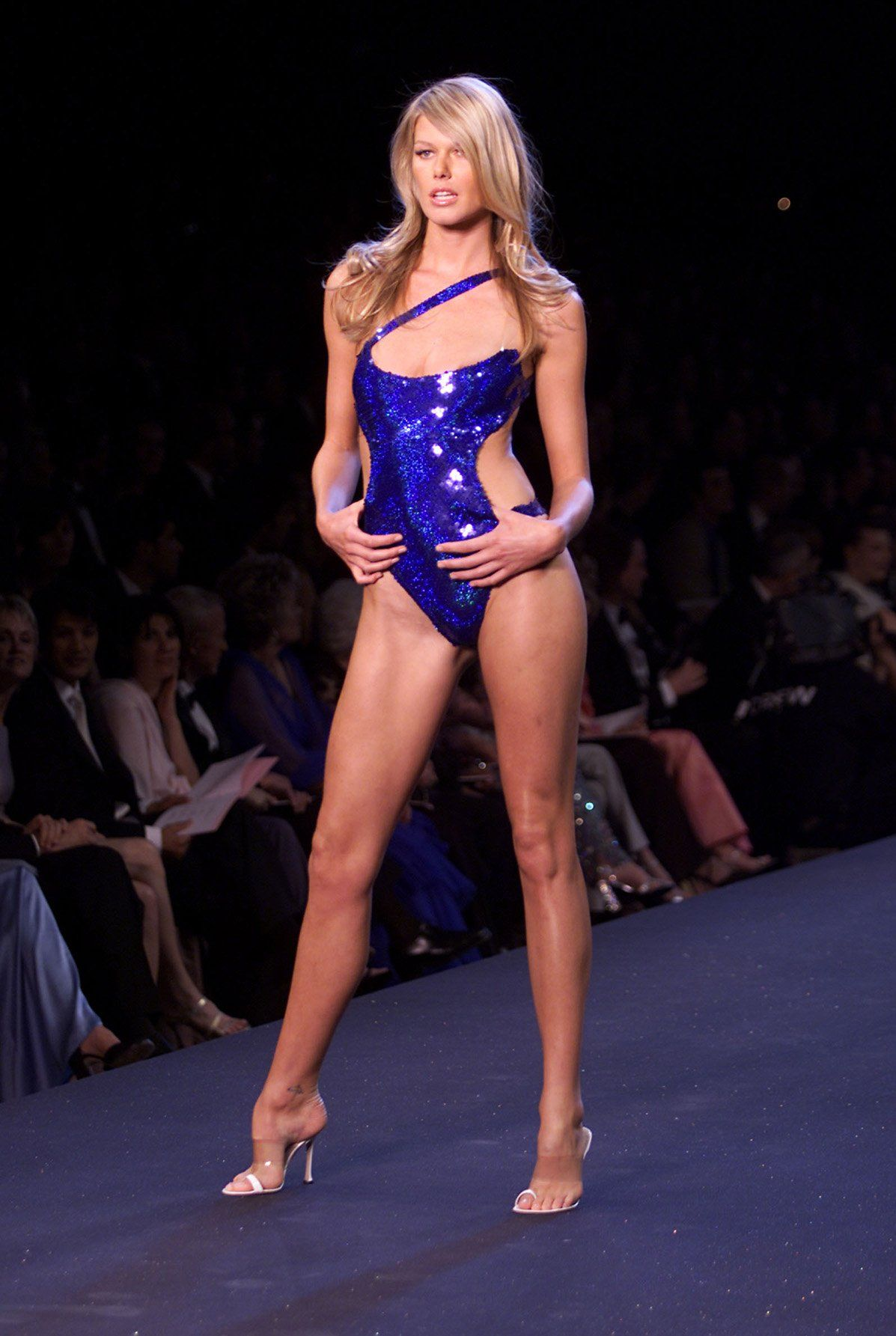
- VSFS 2000
- Born: 28 June 1973 (age 53); Menen, Belgium
- Modeling information
- Height: 1.79 m (5 ft 10 1/2 in)
- Hair color: Blonde
- Eye color: Blue / green
- Agency: The Model CoOp, Trump Model Management, Metropolitan, Munich Models, Premier, Dominique.

Ingrid Seynhaeve (born 28 June 1973) is a Belgian model. In 1991, aged 18, she won the Elite Look of the Year contest, thereafter appearing in advertisements for Guess?, Ralph Lauren, and Saks Fifth Avenue, in catalogs for Victoria's Secret, and on the covers of Elle, Amica, Shape, and the French edition of Cosmopolitan.

Around 1997 she was often seen in Donald Trump's company, including at a Victoria's Secret party where she was photographed between Trump and Jeffrey Epstein. In response to speculation, she has said she had only ever had a professional relationship with Trump.

Seynhaeve has walked for fashion shows such as Michael Kors, Carolina Herrera, Nicole Miller, Elie Saab, Victoria's Secret, Bella Freud, and Bill Blass, and has been considered to be a top model.

In 2007 she presented the Belgian television series Topmodel.

She is married, with two sons.
