= Topmodel (Belgian TV series) =

- Created by: Tyra Banks
- Starring: Ingrid Seynhaeve
- Country of origin: Belgium
- No. of episodes: 10

Production
- Running time: app. 46 minutes (app. 60 with commercials)

Original release
- Network: KanaalTwee
- Release: October 1, 2007 – December 18, 2008

Topmodel is a Belgian reality television show which pits contestants against each other in a variety of competitions to determine who will win a modeling contract with Dominique Models. Belgian model Ingrid Seynhaeve hosts the show, which is based on the top-rating series America's Next Top Model with Tyra Banks.

The debut season of the show premiered on KanaalTwee in October 2007. On it, 10 female contestants of various races, heights and body sizes were placed in an apartment. The 10 had been whittled down from a pool of thousands to compete against one another in various contests designed to simulate the extreme demands placed on professional models. Each week one contestant was eliminated by a panel of judges: Ingrid Seynhaeve, fashion expert Ghislaine Nuytten, model Elise Crombez and photographer Monique Vanendert. Coaches are stylist Lieve Gerrits, acting coach Aza Declercq, and make up artist Vasko Todorof.

The second season premiered one year after the start of season 1 in October 2008 on new network 2BE. An Lemmens replaced Ingrid Seynhaeve as the host of the show. The jury consisted of Marc Douchez from Dominique Models, visagist Rudi Cremers, fashion journalist Els De Pauw, Pascale Belden and again Ghislaine Nuytten, now as the head of the panel of judges. The cast was increased from 10 to 12 in the second season.

== Cycles ==
| Cycle | Premiere date | Winner | Runner-up | Other contestants in order of elimination | Number of contestants | International Destinations |
|---|---|---|---|---|---|---|
| 1 | 1 October 2007 | Hanne Baekelandt | Ine Nijs & Valérie Debeerst | Jessie Colman, An Voorhoof, Tess Gonnissen, Kelly Van Den Kerchove & Elisa Guarraci, Eveline De Winter, Michèle Vanhooren | 10 | New York City |
| 2 | 9 October 2008 | Virginie Bleyaert | Alison Houthuys & Barbara Vanden Bussche | Maite Valck, Hasse De Meyer, Eline Janssen, Imke Courtois, Yana Hermans & Anouchka Muller, Stefanie Broes, Leen Van Belle, Daisy Olie | 12 | Cape Town; Marrakesh |

== See also ==
- Benelux' Next Top Model
- Belgium's Next Top Model
