= Imke Courtois =

Belgian footballer and sports analyst

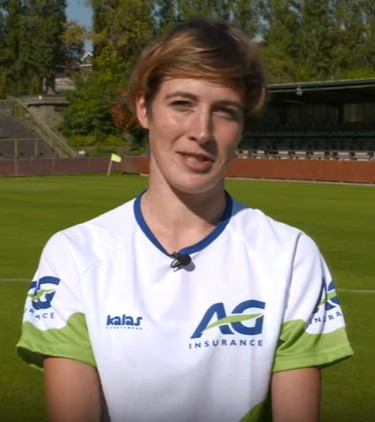
- Courtois at Tienen

Personal information
- Date of birth: 14 March 1988 (age 38)
- Place of birth: Leuven, Belgium
- Height: 1.80 m (5 ft 11 in)
- Position: Defender

Senior career*
Years	Team	Apps	(Gls)
2003–2008	KFC Rapide Wezemaal		
2008–2010	DVC Eva's Tienen		
2010–2017	Standard Liège		

International career
2003	Belgium U17	4	(0)
2004–2007	Belgium U19	23	(1)
2003–2017	Belgium	21	(0)
- * Club domestic league appearances and goals

Imke Courtois (born 14 March 1988) is a Belgian former footballer who played as a defender. She works as a sports analyst. She played for the Belgium national team.

== Playing career ==
Courtois started her senior career at KFC Rapide Wezemaal in 2003. In 2008 she left Wezemaal for DVC Eva's Tienen. From 2010 she played for Standard Liège.

== Media career ==
Courtois is a football analyst for Sporza. She also played in the movie Loft, where she played the part of Sharon's friend.

In 2008 Courtois was also seen in the second series of Topmodel. She finished 9th out of 12 contestants.

== Personal life ==
Courtois is not related to Thibaut Courtois

== Career statistics ==
Club record in UEFA competitions
Club	Caps	Goals
KFC Rapide Wezemaal	17	2
DVC Eva's Tienen	3	0
Standard Liège	8	0
Total	28	2

== Honours ==
- 8 times Belgian Champion
- 3 times Belgian Women's Cup
- 2 times BeNe Super Cup
- 2 times Belgian Super Cup
- 1 time Women's BeNe League
- 1 time Double
