= Benelux' Next Top Model =

Reality TV show

- Created by: Tyra Banks
- Presented by: Daphne Deckers; Ghislaine Nuytten; Geert De Wolf; Bastiaan van Schaik; Mariana Verkerk; Jani Kazaltzis
- Judges: Daphne Deckers; Ghislaine Nuytten; Geert De Wolf; Bastiaan van Schaik; Mariana Verkerk; Jani Kazaltzis
- Countries of origin: Belgium; Netherlands
- No. of episodes: 20

Production
- Running time: app. 46 minutes (app. 60 with commercials)

Original release
- Network: 2BE (Belgium); RTL 5 (Netherlands)
- Release: September 14, 2009 – November 16, 2010

Benelux' Next Top Model is a Dutch-language reality television show that aired in Belgium and the Netherlands. The show was a merge between Holland's Next Top Model, and the Belgian television series Topmodel. The first season premiered in September 2009, and was hosted by Dutch writer and former model Daphne Deckers. Despite the Benelux reference in the title, the program was not broadcast in Luxembourg or Wallonia.

On May 9, 2011 it was announced that Benelux' Next Top Model would not be renewed for a third season. The Dutch production team would continue with a domestic fifth season in the Netherlands, again under the title of Holland's Next Top Model. Topmodel did not return with a third individual season after the merge resumed.

== Show format ==
The first season of Benelux' Next Top Model had 10 episodes and started with 12 contestants. A thirteenth contestant, Melanie Weterings, was added to the cast as a result of having won a separate "wildcard" competition. In general, each episode, one contestant was eliminated, though there were cases of a double elimination by consensus of the judging panel. Makeovers were administered to contestants early in the season (usually after the first or second elimination in the finals), and a trip to an international destination was scheduled at about two-thirds of the way through the season (usually with five or six contestants remaining).

Each episode covered the events of roughly a week of real time (however, while overseas, an episode roughly covered three to four days, totalling two weeks of filming abroad), and featured a fashion challenge, photo shoot or commercial, judging, and critique of each contestant and her performance by the judging panel led by Daphne Deckers, and the elimination of one or more contestants. Usually, an additional guest judge sat in on the panel every week. Each episode was usually associated with a theme in the world of modeling, such as dealing with the press in interviews, selling a commercial product, appearing in a runway show or going on "go sees".

An episode usually began with the contestants receiving training in an area concurrent with the week's theme. For example, contestants were coached in runway walking, improvisational acting, or applying make-up to suit various occasions. A related challenge soon followed, such as a mock runway show or interview, and a winner was chosen by a judge. She received some prize, such as clothing, a night out, or an advantage at the next photo shoot, and she was usually allowed to share the benefits with a certain number of other contestants of her choice.

The next segment was a photo shoot, and each contestant's performance reflected heavily on her judging for that week. Each season featured photo shoots such as bikini or lingerie shots, beauty shots, posing nude or semi-nude, posing with a male model, and posing with animals. Usually one photo shoot per season was replaced with a commercial shoot.

The final segment of each episode was judging. Each contestant's photo was shown and evaluated by the judging panel. After all photos were evaluated, the contestants left the room as the judges deliberated. The elimination process is ceremonious, as Deckers revealed and handed out the photos of the contestants that were safe one by one, in order of merit. The last two contestants standing were brought up as "the bottom two", and Deckers critiqued each one before revealing which of the two was eliminated.

The three remaining contestants competed in a runway show in front of the judges and a live audience. After the runway show, the judges voted on the contestants and the results determined the winner.

== Cycles ==
Cycle	Premiere date	Winner	Runner-up	Other contestants in order of elimination	Number of contestants	International Destinations
1	14 September 2009	Rosalinde Kikstra	Denise Menes & Maxime van Steenvoort	Alexandra Carneval, Roxanne de Craene & Adinda Kennedy, Sarah van der Meer, Tessa Kort & Melanie Weterings, Justine Desmet, Bianca Kortzorg, Catharina Elias, Lianne Bakker	13	Miami
2	13 September 2010	Melissa Baas	Renée Trompert	Jacqueline Sorbie, Lisse Habraken, Daisy Koller, Lesley van Helden, Epiphany Vanderhaeghen, Aïcha Cissé, Frederieke Bonn, Jaelle Leclerc, Marjolein De Velder, Alix Schoonheijt	12	Paris; Oranjestad; Los Angeles
