= Top Model (Polish TV series) season 6 =

Top Model
- Season 6
- No. of episodes: 13

Release
- Original network: TVN
- Original release: September 6 – November 29, 2016

Season chronology
- ← Previous; Season 5 Next → Season 7

Top Model, cycle 6 is the sixth cycle of an ongoing reality television series based on Tyra Banks' America's Next Top Model that pits contestants from Poland against each other in a variety of competitions to determine who will win the title of the next Polish Top Model.

Joanna Krupa, who also serves as the lead judge, returned to host the sixth cycle. Other judges included fashion designer Dawid Woliński, fashion show director Kasia Sokołowska and photographer Marcin Tyszka. This is the third season of the show to feature male contestants in the cast after cycles 4 and 5. Among the prizes for the season are a contract with Avant Models, an appearance on the cover of the Polish issue of Glamour and 100,000 złotys (US$30,000).

The international destinations this cycle are, Madrid, Campo de Criptana and Eilat.

== Contestants ==
(ages stated are at start of contest)

Contestant	Age	Height	Hometown	Finish	Place
Kamil Popławski	19	1.80 m (5 ft 11 in)	Opole	Episode 4	15
Zuzanna 'Zuza' Matysiak	19	1.84 m (6 ft 1/2 in)	Mrągowo	Episode 5	14
Mariusz Tomczak	24	1.97 m (6 ft 5 1/2 in)	Rokietnica	Episode 6	13
Aleksandr 'Sasza' Muzheiko	22	1.87 m (6 ft 1 1/2 in)	Hrytsiv, Ukraine	Episode 7	12
Aleksandra 'Ola' Zbinkowska	21	1.74 m (5 ft 8 1/2 in)	Wrocław	Episode 7	11
Mateusz Zapotocki	20	1.82 m (5 ft 11 1/2 in)	Przemyśl	Episode 8	10
Kamila Warzecha	18	1.73 m (5 ft 8 in)	Opole	Episode 9	9
Mateusz Mil	21	1.88 m (6 ft 2 in)	Jarosław	Episode 10	8
Adam Niedźwiedź	22	1.86 m (6 ft 1 in)	Katowice	Episode 11	7
Adrianna 'Ada' Daniel	21	1.75 m (5 ft 9 in)	Mielec	Episode 11	6
Natalia Karabasz	19	1.76 m (5 ft 9 1/2 in)	Wałcz	Episode 12	5
Daniel Tracz	18	1.88 m (6 ft 2 in)	Jordanów Śląski	Episode 12	4
Daria Zhalina	20	1.81 m (5 ft 11 1/2 in)	Kaliningrad, Russia	Episode 13	3
Ewelina 'Ewa' Niespodziana	18	1.82 m (5 ft 11 1/2 in)	Wągrowiec	Episode 13	2
Patryk Grudowicz	19	1.88 m (6 ft 2 in)	Ostróda	Episode 13	1

== Episodes ==
=== Episode 1 ===
Original aridate: September 6, 2016

Auditions for the sixth season of Top Model begin, and aspiring hopefuls are chosen for the semi-final round.

=== Episode 2 ===
Original airdate: September 13, 2016

In the semi-finals, the judges begin to eliminate contestants to narrow the number of models who will battle it out for a place in the final fifteen.

=== Episode 3 ===
Original airdate: September 20, 2016

In the third and final casting episode of the season, the judges choose the finalists who will move onto the main competition out of the remaining pool of contestants.

Group	Models
**One**	**Asia**, Daria, **Hubert**, Mariusz, Natalia, Patryk, **Pawel**
**Two**	Ada, **Ahmed**, **Julia**, Kamil, Mateusz M, **Nicol**, Ola
**Three**	**Adam**, **Dominika**, Kamila, **Kasia**, Mateusz Z, Sasza, **Zosia**
**Four**	Adam, Daniel, Ewa, **Kasjusz**, Zuza

- Names in **bold** represent eliminated semi-finalists

=== Episode 4 ===
Original airdate: September 27, 2016

- Challenge winner: Ewa Niespodziana
- Immune from elimination: Daniel Tracz, Daria Zhalina, Mateusz Zapotocki, Ola Zbinkowska, Patryk Grudowicz, Sasza Muzheiko & Zuza Matysiak
- First call-out: Patryk Grudowicz
- Bottom three: Kamil Popławski, Mariusz Tomczak & Mateusz Mil
- Eliminated: Kamil Popławski
- Featured photographers: Robert Wolański
- Special guests: Łukasz Jemioł
- Guest judge: Robert Wolański

=== Episode 5 ===
Original airdate: October 4, 2016

- First challenge winners: Daniel Tracz, Daria Zhalina, Ewa Niespodziana, Mateusz Mil & Natalia Karabasz
- Second challenge winner: Adam Niedźwiedź
- First call-out: Adam Niedźwiedź
- Bottom three: Ewa Niespodziana, Kamila Warzecha & Zuza Matysiak
- Eliminated: Zuza Matysiak
- Featured photographers: Anna Bioda
- Special guests: Basia Richards, Małgorzata Kożuchowska, Monika Mariotti, Maciej Musiałowski, Agnieszka Przepiórska
- Guest judge: Anna Jurgaś

=== Episode 6 ===
Original airdate: October 11, 2016

- Challenge winner: Mateusz Mil
- First call-out: Daria Zhalina
- Bottom three: Ewa Niespodziana, Mariusz Tomczak & Sasza Muzheiko
- Eliminated: Mariusz Tomczak
- Special guests: Sandra Kubicka

=== Episode 7 ===
Original airdate: October 18, 2016

- First challenge winners: Ada Daniel, Ewa Niespodziana, Patryk Grudowicz & Sasza Muzheiko
- Second challenge winners: Ewa Niespodziana & Patryk Grudowicz
- Eliminated outside of judging panel: Sasza Muzheiko
- First call-out: Ewa Niespodziana & Mateusz Mil
- Bottom three: Kamila Warzecha, Mateusz Zapotocki & Ola Zbinkowska
- Eliminated: Ola Zbinkowska
- Featured photographer: Agnieszka Kulesza & Łukasz Pik
- Special guests: Bartek Lipka, Małgorzata Leitner, Anna Jagodzinska
- Guest judge: Anna Jagodzinska

=== Episode 8 ===
Original airdate: October 25, 2016

- Challenge winner: Mateusz Mil
- Second challenge winners: Adam Niedźwiedź, Ewa Niespodziana & Mateusz Mil
- First call-out: Patryk Grudowicz
- Bottom three: Ada Daniel, Mateusz Zapotocki & Natalia Karabasz
- Eliminated: Mateusz Zapotocki
- Special guests: Tamara Gonzalez-Perea, Weronika Książkiewicz, MasterChef Junior finalists (from I season)
- Guest judge: Weronika Książkiewicz

=== Episode 9 ===
Original airdate: November 1, 2016

- Challenge winner: Daniel Tracz, Daria Zhalina & Mateusz Mil
- Second challenge winner: Ada Daniel
- First call-out: Daniel Tracz
- Bottom two: Kamila Warzecha & Natalia Karabasz
- Eliminated: Kamila Warzecha
- Featured photographer: Jacek Kołodziejski
- Special guests: Anna Jurgaś, Michał Szpak, Dawid Kwiatkowski, Reni Jusis, Filip Bobek, Helen Graffner, Łukasz Tunikowski, Jan Wieczorkowski
- Guest judge: Marta Kuligowska

=== Episode 10 ===
Original airdate: November 8, 2016

- Challenge winner: Ada Daniel
- First call-out: Daniel Tracz
- Bottom three: Daria Zhalina, Ewa Niespodziana & Mateusz Mil
- Eliminated: Ewa Niespodziana & Mateusz Mil
- Saved: Ewa Niespodziana
- Featured photographer: Marcin Tyszka
- Special guests: Karolina Pilarczyk, Michał Kuś, Anna Jagodzińska, Mariusz Przybylski
- Guest judge: Mariusz Przybylski

=== Episode 11 ===
Original airdate: November 15, 2016

- Challenge winners: Daniel Tracz & Natalia Karabasz
- Eliminated outside of judging panel: Adam Niedźwiedź
- First call-out: Daria Zhalina
- Bottom two: Ada Daniel & Ewa Niespodziana
- Eliminated: Ada Daniel
- Guest judge: Mónica Cruz

=== Episode 12 ===
Original airdate: November 22, 2016

- First call-out: Patryk Grudowicz
- Bottom three: Daniel Tracz, Ewa Niespodziana & Natalia Karabasz
- First Eliminated: Natalia Karabasz
- Bottom two: Daniel Tracz & Ewa Niespodziana
- Eliminated: Daniel Tracz
- Guest judge: Michał Piróg

=== Episode 13 ===
Original airdate: November 29, 2016

- Final three: Daria Zhalina, Ewa Niespodziana & Patryk Grudowicz
- Eliminated: Daria Zhalina
- Final two: Ewa Niespodziana & Patryk Grudowicz
- Poland's Next Top Model: Patryk Grudowicz
- Guest judge: Anna Jagodzińska

== Summaries ==
=== Call-out order ===
Order	Episodes											
Order	3 (Note: Episodes 1, 2 and 3 were casting episodes. In episode 3, the pool of semi-finalists was reduced to the final 15 models who moved on to the main competition.)	4 (Note: In episodes 4 and 7, the best-performing contestant from each photo shoot pair was deemed immune at panel.)	5	6	7 (Note: In episodes 4 and 7, the best-performing contestant from each photo shoot pair was deemed immune at panel.) (Note: In episode 7, Sasza was eliminated outside of judging panel during the episode's second challenge after forgetting to bring his portfolio.)	8	9	10 (Note: In episode 10, Ewa was originally eliminated, but mentor Michał Pirog, who'd been granted the opportunity of bringing an eliminated contestant back into the competition, decided to save her.)	11	12 (Note: In episode 12, there was a double elimination. Ewa, Daniel, and Natalia landed in the bottom three. Natalia was the first contestant to be eliminated, then the judges pick between Ewa and Daniel, Joanna gave the last photo to Ewa.)	13	
1	Kamil	Patryk	Adam	Daria	Ewa; Mateusz M.	Patryk	Daniel	Daniel	Daria	Patryk	Patryk	Patryk
2	Ada	Ola	Patryk	Mateusz M.	Ewa; Mateusz M.	Daria	Daria	Natalia	Patryk	Daria	Ewa	Ewa
3	Ola	Daniel	Daria	Natalia	Adam	Kamila	Ewa	Patryk	Natalia	Natalia	Daria	
4	Mateusz M.	Daria	Sasza	Kamila	Daniel	Ewa	Patryk	Ada	Daniel	Ewa		
5	Mateusz Z.	Mateusz Z.	Mateusz Z.	Ada	Patryk	Daniel	Ada	Adam	Ewa	Daniel		
6	Sasza	Sasza	Ada	Daniel	Ada	Mateusz M.	Mateusz M.	Daria	Ada			
7	Kamila	Zuza	Daniel	Patryk	Natalia	Adam	Adam	Ewa	Adam			
8	Natalia	Ada	Ola	Mateusz Z.	Daria	Ada	Natalia	Mateusz M.				
9	Mariusz	Ewa	Natalia	Adam	Mateusz Z.	Natalia	Kamila					
10	Daria	Natalia	Mateusz M.	Ola	Kamila	Mateusz Z.						
11	Patryk	Adam	Mariusz	Ewa	Ola							
12	Ewa	Kamila	Kamila	Sasza	Sasza							
13	Zuza	Mateusz M.	Ewa	Mariusz								
14	Adam; Daniel	Mariusz	Zuza									
15	Adam; Daniel	Kamil										

The contestant was immune from elimination
The contestant was eliminated
The contestant was eliminated outside of judging panel
The contestant was originally eliminated but was saved.
The contestant won the competition

=== Photo shoot guide ===
- Episode 3 photo shoot: Group shots (semifinals)
- Episode 4 photo shoot: Circus attractions
- Episode 5 photo shoot: Nude shoot by a pool
- Episode 6 photo shoot: Posing with pests on a railroad
- Episode 7 photo shoot: Make love not war
- Episode 8 photo shoot: Masterchef kids
- Episode 9 photo shoot: Police intervention
- Episode 10 photo shoots: Simplistic & high fashion by Marcin Tyszka
- Episode 11 photo shoots: Windmill editorial
- Episode 12 photo shoots: Haute couture in Madrid
- Episode 13 photo shoot: Glamour magazine covers & spreads in Eilat

== Post–Top Model careers ==
- Kamil Popławski signed with Specto Models. He has taken a couple of test shots, modeled for Ozonee PL, Slavinia PL FW17, Denley PL, Iced Stuff, Gentiluomo Milano, Lamanuel Man,... and walked in fashion shows of Versace, Jaga Hupało, Patryk Wojciechowski, Olga Kincel,... Beside modeling, he has competed on Mister Polski 2017 and competed as a contestant on Hotel Paradise 2021.
- Zuza Matysiak has taken a couple of test shots and walked in fashion shows of Versace, Basia Olearka,... She has modeled for Reserved, Basia Olearka, Prepostevolution Summer 2017, Celebrity Clothing PL, Szlachetna Paczka,... Beside modeling, she has competed on Miss Warsaw 2019 and placed 2nd Runner-up.
- Mariusz Tomczak has taken a couple of test shots, modeled for Szlachetna Paczka and appeared on magazine editorials for Obvious US April 2017, Kodd France May 2017,... He retired from modeling in 2018.
- Sasza Muzheiko signed with Charme De La Mode Agency. He has taken a couple of test shots, take part in several fashion shows and modeled for Denley PL, Łatka Fashion, American Outlet PL, Szlachetna Paczka,... Beside modeling, he has appear in several TV-show such as Warsaw Shore 2019, Love Island. Wyspa miłości 2022 which he won,... Muzheiko retired from modeling in 2021.
- Ola Zbinkowska has taken a couple of test shots, walked in fashion show for Versace and modeled for Reserved, More’moi, Patriotic Lady PL, Szlachetna Paczka,... Beside modeling, she has appeared in several music videos such as "Dionizos" by Z.B.U.K.U, "Ja na Ciebie lecę" by Power Play,... She retired from modeling in 2020.
- Mateusz Zapotocki signed with Specto Models, X Management, Carmen Durán Model Agency in Valencia and Exiles Model Management in Tokyo. He has taken a couple of test shots and appeared on magazine editorials for Digital Camera Polska April 2017, Papercut US June 2018, Hiro October 2020,... He has modeled for L'Oréal, Jolie Su, Diverse System PL, Szlachetna Paczka, Extrême Ice Cream,... Zapotocki retired from modeling in 2024.
- Kamila Warzecha has taken a couple of test shots and modeled for Szlachetna Paczka. She retired from modeling in 2018.
- Mateusz Mil signed with Charme De La Mode Agency, Uncover Models, 6th Avenue Models in New Delhi and Indastria Model Management in Milan. He has taken a couple of test shots and modeled for Male-Me PL, Jabong.com India, Amazon Fashion India, Koovs India, Forever 21 India, Array Clothing India SS19, Anti by Gibaszewski, Drawc Store, Moliera2, Szlachetna Paczka,... He has appeared on magazine cover and editorials for Provocator Russia, Elegant US, Hiro October 2020,... and walked in fashion shows of Mariusz Przybylski, MSKPU, Dhruv Vaish FW19,... Beside modeling, Mil has competed as a contestant on Hotel Paradise 2021 and appeared in several music videos such as "Don’t Ask Me" by Flary, "Fallin'" by Austee Fox ft. Michał Grobelny & Beata Orbik, "Merch" by Miły Mo,...
- Adam Niedźwiedź signed with AS Management. He has taken a couple of test shots and walked in fashion show for Mariusz Przybylski. He has modeled for Reserved, Ireneus Atelier, Big Star Jeans, Mr Kowalski Watches, KSW Shop, Szlachetna Paczka,... and appeared on magazine editorials for Risk US February 2017, Kaltblut Germany February 2017, Kodd France February 2017, Offset #2 February–March 2018,... Beside modeling, Niedźwiedź is also the ambassador of Under Armour. He retired from modeling in 2021.
- Ada Daniel has worked under her real name "Adrianna" and signed with Avant Models, AS Management, The Wolves Model Management in Milan, Best Models Agency in Porto, Louisa Models in Hamburg, Metro Models in Zürich, Select Model Management & Idol Model Management in Stockholm. She has taken a couple of test shots and walked in fashion show for Marta Banaszek SS19. She has appeared on magazine cover and editorials for Promo US #42 May 2017, Cosmopolitan May 2017, Joy #6 June 2018, Laud Australia November 2018, Glamour February 2020,... and modeled for Reserved, Lancôme, Avon, ECCO, Zalando, Wella, Esotiq, Just Unique PL, Naoko Store, Answear, Diverse System PL, Laurelle PL FW17.18, Renee PL, Glov PL, L'AF Collection SS18, Marques Soares Portugal SS18, Bus Urban Wear Portugal SS18, Pooze Portugal FW18.19, Sinsay, Big Star Jeans, Sposa PL, Sugarfree PL, Soraya PL, Bunny The Star FW21, Top Secret PL Fall 2021, New Yorker, Modivo PL, Mohito PL, Szlachetna Paczka, IWC Home, Raffaello,...
- Natalia Karabasz signed with Specto Models, AS Management, Uncover Models, Daman Management in Istanbul, MMG Models in Dubai, New Madison Models in Paris, M&P Models in London, Legend Model in Aarhus, Clear Management in Madrid, Trend Models in Barcelona, Spin Model Management in Hamburg, MP Management & Select Model Management in Milan, D Model Agency & Ace Models in Athens. She has taken a couple of test shots and walked in fashion shows of Maciej Zien, Douchanglee FW19, At One Ment FW19.20,... She has modeled for Esprit, Yadotsa Malaysia SS17, Iora Singapore, MJMV Underwear, Answear, Patrizia Ayrton, Buro 24/7, Donghai Fashion, Ivan Young, Kisscat Shoes Malaysia, Miss Liberte, Waleria Tokarzewska-Karaszewicz FW17.18, Ounass UAE, I Am Stores Italia, Marco Bologna FW19.20, La Double J Resort 2020, Nomination Italy, Gatta PL, Sakura Road, Top Secret PL, Dyson, Aldar Properties, Szlachetna Paczka,... and appeared on magazine cover and editorials for Citta Bella Malaysia April 2017, L'Officiel Malaysia April 2017, Prestige Malaysia April 2017, Newtide Malaysia April 2017, Institute UK April 2017, Dreamingless Greece May 2017, Tatler Malaysia May 2017, Harper's Bazaar Malaysia May 2017, Lips Thailand August 2017, Women's Health Spain November 2017, Cake US December 2017, Jamalouki UAE March 2018, L'Officiel Azerbaijan April 2018, A&E UAE May 2018, L'Officiel Nederland May 2018, Friday UAE December 2018, Grazia Italia February 2019, Elle May 2020, Glamour September 2020,...
- Daniel Tracz signed with AS Management, X Management, Louisa Models in Munich, Francina Models in Barcelona, Rain Management in Marbella, True Models, Daman Management & Flash Model Management in Istanbul. He has taken a couple of test shots and walked in fashion shows of Mariusz Przybylski, Rage Age, Hyundai Autoneo Fashion Show 2017,... He has modeled for Reserved, Cropp, Diverse System FW21, Łukasz Jemioł, Modivo PL, Outhorn, Próchnik PL FW23, Pilawski Spring 2024, Szlachetna Paczka,... and appeared on magazine cover and editorials for Glamour, Be Man Turkey, Kaltblut Germany March 2017, Mandrawn Hungary #1 Fall 2017, Yearbook Fanzine UK August 2017, Hiro November 2017, Esquire Turkey December 2017, XOXO US January 2018, Boylicious Mexico October 2021,... Beside modeling, Tracz has represent Poland compete on several beauty pageants such as Mister Supranational 2023, Mister Universe 2024,...
- Daria Zhalina signed with AS Management, Selective Management, Rebel Models, MMG Models in Dubai, True Models in Istanbul, Crawford Models in New York City, First Model Management in London, Metropolitan Models in Paris, Wild Management in Madrid, Ace Models in Athens, Stella Models in Vienna, Most Wanted Models in Munich, East West Models in Frankfurt, Viva Models & Seeds Management in Berlin, Independent Model Management, Wave Management & The Wall Models in Milan. She has modeled for Palmer Harding, Wella, Sephora, Harmont & Blaine, Sotho PL SS17, Pomelo Fashion FW17.18, Hatem Alakeel, Zalando Lounge Winter 2017, Faissal El-Malak SS18, Maryam Omaira, Arwa Al Banawi, Hexeline SS19, Answear, Vanilla Stuff PL, Vathos Apparel, Celia Kritharioti, Echo PL, Attica Store Greece, Sugarfree PL FW21.22, Lebrand PL, Calliope Barci Greece, Miaou US, Szlachetna Paczka,... and walked in fashion shows of Dawid Woliński, Robert Kupisz, Bizuu Fashion, La Mania, Bohoboco, Łukasz Jemioł, Ana Locking, Tony Ward Couture, Lidia Kalita SS17, Paprocki Brzozowski SS17, Tomasz Ossoliński SS17, Armato SS18, Atelier Zuhra SS18, Essa SS18, Hussein Bazaza SS18, Joao Rolo SS18, Madiyah al Sharqi SS18, Nabil Nayal SS18, Zareena SS18, Gosia Baczyńska SS18, Ranita Sobańska SS18, Maciej Zien SS18, Calisii FW18.19, William Fan FW18.19, Isabel Vollrath FW18.19, Perret Schaad FW18.19, Thecadess FW18.19, Solar PL SS19, Susana Bettencourt SS20, Act N°1 SS22,... She has appeared on magazine cover and editorials for Vogue Arabia, Haya UAE, Beaute Greece, Latest Italia, Yo Dona Spain January 2017, Viva January 2017, Marie Claire Turkey May 2017, Hunger UK May 2017, Whitemad September 2017, Jamalouki UAE October 2017, Harper's Bazaar Arabia October 2017, Grazia UAE October 2017, Elle UAE November 2017, Zahrat Al Khaleej UAE December 2017, Nails Trendy May 2018, Joy #6 June 2018, Kluid Spain July 2018, Pani November 2018, Obvious US March 2019, Glasses Project May 2019, Prinçipal #23 Fall 2019, Varsovie Winter 2019, Lśnienie August 2020, L'Officiel Lithuania August 2020, 7Hues US #55 November–December 2020, Elle Greece December 2020, Woman Austria December 2020,...
- Ewa Niespodziana signed with Hiro Model Management. She has taken a couple of test shots and walked in fashion shows of Versace, Robert Kupisz, Sandra Stachura, Aneta Larysa Knap, Gabriél Fashion PL, De La Fotta FW18, Mo.Ya Fashion,... She has modeled for L'Oréal, Swag Shop PL, DeVu Diana Walkiewicz, Salvatore Piccione, Klaudia Markiewicz, Slavinia PL FW17, Tymoszewicz Design, Szlachetna Paczka,... and appeared on magazine cover and editorials for Hiro February 2017, Trendy Szczecin #3 March 2017, Whitemad March 2017, Beau Nu US March 2017, Playboy #7 July 2017, CKM July 2017,... Niespodziana retired from modeling in 2020.
- Patryk Grudowicz has collected his prizes and signed with Avant Models. He is also signed with Chili Models and has taken a couple of test shots. He has modeled for Lou PL Winter 2016, Tulzo PL, Diverse System, Kazar SS17, Happy Surfer PL, Sheila PL FW18, Olena Didora, Suntago,... has walked in fashion shows of Guess, Dawid Woliński, Rage Age, Robert Kupisz, Mariusz Przybylski, Kazar SS17, Paul & Shark FW17.18, Maurizio Benttoni SS18, Marc O'Polo SS19, Van Graaf,... and appeared on magazine cover and editorials for Glamour January 2017, iMute Romania March 2017, Kaltblut Germany July 2017, Kodd France July 2017, Dreamingless UK #43 November 2018,... Grudowicz retired from modeling in 2022.

== Rating figures ==
Episode	Date	Official rating 4+	Share 4+	Share 16–39
1	6 September 2016	1 297 420	9,82%	14,97%
2	13 September 2016	1 387 305	10,62%	16,78%
3	20 September 2016	1 375 443	10,53%	16,42%
4	27 September 2016	1 310 252	9,66%	14,21%
5	4 October 2016	1 765 990	12,99%	20,39%
6	11 October 2016	1 532 225	9,62%	14,68%
7	18 October 2016	1 360 489	9,25%	13,74%
8	25 October 2016	1 739 203	12,46%	19,21%
9	1 November 2016	1 713 692	12,20%	16,57%
10	8 November 2016	1 614 330	12,19%	18,73%
11	15 November 2016	1 626 310	12,01%	19,56%
12	22 November 2016	1 466 110	9,81%	14,76%
13	29 November 2016	1 594 600	11,19%	15,20%
Average	2016	1 522 817	10,93%	16,47%
