= Top Model (Polish TV series) season 5 =

Top Model
- Season 5
- No. of episodes: 13

Release
- Original network: TVN
- Original release: 7 September – 30 November 2015

Season chronology
- ← Previous; Season 4 Next → Season 6

Top Model, Cycle 5, a reality show inspired by Tyra Banks' America's Next Top Model that pits contestants from Poland against each other in a variety of competitions to determine who will win the title of the next Polish Top Model.

Joanna Krupa, who also serves as the lead judge, returned to host the fifth cycle. Other judges included fashion designer Dawid Woliński, fashion show director Kasia Sokołowska and photographer Marcin Tyszka. Cycle 5 marks the second time the show has featured male contestants, following cycle 4. Among the prizes for the season were a contract with Avant Models, an appearance on the cover of the Polish issue of Glamour and 100,000 złotys (US$30,000).

Starting this cycle, Michał Piróg has been given the opportunity to save one contestant from elimination by the judges.

The international destinations for this cycle are Tel Aviv, Ho Chi Minh City, Cần Thơ and Arrecife. The season began airing on September 7, 2015. The winner of the competition was a 19-year-old Radek Pestka, from Gdynia, the first male winner in the show's history.

== Auditions ==
The auditions for season five took place from June 13 to June 18, 2015, in the cities of Gdańsk, Katowice and Warsaw.

City	Audition Date
Gdańsk	June 13
Katowice	June 15
Warsaw	June 18

== Contestants ==
(ages stated are at start of contest)

Contestant	Age	Height	Hometown	Finish	Place
Justyna Łopian	18	1.73 m (5 ft 8 in)	Bytom	Episode 4	14
Jagoda Judzińska	26	1.73 m (5 ft 8 in)	Sandomierz	Episode 5	13
Sebastian Zawiliński	22	1.93 m (6 ft 4 in)	Warsaw	Episode 6	12–11
Aleksandra 'Ola' Ławnik-Sadkowska	18	1.75 m (5 ft 9 in)	Warsaw	Episode 6	12–11
Michael Mikołajczuk	22	1.86 m (6 ft 1 in)	Żary	Episode 7	10
Natalia Gulkowska	21	1.76 m (5 ft 9 1/2 in)	Warsaw	Episode 9	9 (quit)
Kamila Ibrom	19	1.80 m (5 ft 11 in)	Ruda Śląska	Episode 10	8–7
Andre Whyte	27	1.85 m (6 ft 1 in)	Staten Island, United States	Episode 10	8–7
Samuel Kowalski	22	1.86 m (6 ft 1 in)	Starachowice	Episode 11	6
Magdalena 'Magda' Stępień-Kolesnikow	23	1.75 m (5 ft 9 in)	Wrocław	Episode 12	5–4
Karolina Gilon	25	1.80 m (5 ft 11 in)	Mrągowo	Episode 12	5–4
Jakob Kosel	22	1.92 m (6 ft 3 1/2 in)	Częstochowa	Episode 13	3
Karolina Pisarek	17	1.72 m (5 ft 7 1/2 in)	Szczecinek	Episode 13	2
Radosław 'Radek' Pestka	19	1.81 m (5 ft 11 1/2 in)	Gdynia	Episode 13	1

== Episodes ==
=== Episode 1 ===
Original aridate: September 7, 2015

Auditions for the fifth season of Poland's Next Top Model begin, and aspiring hopefuls are chosen for the semi-final round.

=== Episode 2 ===
Original airdate: September 14, 2015

In the semi-finals, the judges begin to eliminate contestants to narrow the number of models who will battle it out for a place in the final fourteen.

=== Episode 3 ===
Original airdate: September 21, 2015

In the third and final casting episode of the season, the judges choose the finalists who will move onto the main competition out of the remaining pool of contestants.

Group	Models	Theme
**One**	**Dominica**, Jagoda, Justyna, **Konrad**, Natalia, Ola	Nymphs
**Two**	Andre, Jakob, **Kajetan**, Karolina P, Michael, Sebastian	Country club
**Three**	**Ewelina**, **Janek**, Karolina G, **Mateusz**, Samuel	Paddleboarding
**Four**	**Erwin**, Kamila, Magda, **Monika**, Radek	Gypsies

- Names in **bold** represent eliminated semi-finalists

=== Episode 4 ===
Original airdate: September 28, 2015

One by one, the chosen fourteen finalists move into the top model house. Some are displeased to find that contestants they dislike have been put through to the final cast. The following day the models receive their makeovers, causing displeasure among several of the girls who fear that their hair will be cut short. Jagoda openly complains about her new hair color, believing it doesn't suit her look. For the first photo shoot of the competition, the models are divided based on gender to shoot two separate covers for Glamour magazine, getting to pose with last season's top two - Michal and Osi. Back at the house, Michael, Karolina G, and Magda begin speculating on who will be eliminated at the first round of judging.

For the official photo shoot of the week, the contestants meet Miss Polonia 2011, Marcelina Zawadzka, and photographer Jacek Kolodziejski for a session with parachutes. Before getting styled, each contestant is flown on a plane to take turns skydiving. Andre, Jakob, Karolina P, Ola and Radek are all standouts on set. Natalia is critiqued for bringing little energy on set, while Justyna and Kamila struggle.

At panel Joanna reveals that mentor Michał Pirog will be given the opportunity to bring one eliminated contestant back into the competition immediately after their elimination whenever he chooses. Jakob is deemed to have taken the best photo during the shoot, with Justyna and Kamila being placed in the bottom two for their lackluster photos. In spite of having expressed her desire to leave, Joanna hands the last photo to Kamila, and Justyna becomes the first finalist to be eliminated.

- First call-out: Jakob Kosel
- Bottom two: Justyna Łopian & Kamila Ibrom
- Eliminated: Justyna Łopian
- Featured photographers: Zuza Krajewska (Glamour shoot) Jacek Kolodziejski (Parachute shoot)
- Special guests: Łukasz Urbański, Michał Baryza, Osi Ugonoh
- Guest judge: Marcelina Zawadzka

=== Episode 5 ===
Original airdate: October 5, 2015

The remaining thirteen contestants receive a runway lesson from judge Kasia Sokołowska before being put to their paces in their very first runway show. At the venue they are introduced to model Zo Nowak, who shares tips based on her experience. Backstage, Samuel refuses to wear a snake print jacket due to his religious convictions, explaining that snake print was a 'symbol of evil'. After threatening to drop out of the competition, he is given a new outfit - much to the annoyance of several of the other contestants. On the catwalk, the models must remain composed while avoiding being struck by swinging pendulums. Natalia is noted for her marked improvement on the runway, but it is Andre who impresses the judges the most and wins the challenge.

- Challenge winner: Andre Whyte

Back at the house, the male contestants are waxed. At the shoot, the contestants are told that they will have pose nude. Those who refuse are given the option to work with 'partners' that won't be revealed until the session begins.

Alternative	Models
Insects	Kamila, Karolina G, Karolina P, Samuel, Sebastian, Ola
Naked	Andre, Jagoda, Jakob, Magda, Michael, Natalia & Radek

Karolina P. becomes agitated after several of the worms and millipedes she is posing with begin to crawl into her bra and underwear, with the rest having no issues. Samuel is given snakes to work with, causing a confrontation between him, Magda and Kamila, with the latter two pointing out his hypocrisy at having refused to wear the snake print earlier that week, but having no qualms about posing with a real snake. Natalia and Radek impress the most on set, while Jagoda makes a poor impression due to her crass attitude and lack of tact with the photographer.

Zo Nowak sits as the fifth judge at panel. Jakob, Magda, Natalia and Radek are all praised, but it is Radek who receives best photo. Jagoda and Ola land in the bottom two, and Jagoda is eliminated from the competition.

- First call-out: Radek Pestka
- Bottom two: Jagoda Judzińska & Ola Ławnik-Sadkowska
- Eliminated: Jagoda Judzińska
- Featured photographer: Piotr Domagała
- Special guests: Zo Nowak
- Guest judge: Zo Nowak

=== Episode 6 ===
Original airdate: October 12, 2015

The contestants return home from the previous elimination, and several are surprised that Radek received best photo. The following morning, the models are visited by celebrity personal trainer Tomasz Oświęcinski for a vigorous exercise session. Natalia bails out halfway through the session, being lambasted by the trainer and several of the other contestants due to her laziness.

Later in the day, they are driven to a studio to meet with Michał Pirog for the challenge. Each of the models will have to pose with some of the contestants from the previous cycle, Marta, Michalina and Michał, to recreate a Bruno Banani campaign. Karolina P. is deemed to have done the best job, and is rewarded with a box full of Bruno Banani cosmetics and a voucher worth 2000zł.

- Challenge winner: Karolina Pisarek

The following day the models arrive at a prison and are asked to change into jumpsuits. They are quickly confronted by an aggressive cop and inmate, who are revealed to be actors Marcin Perchuć and Julia Pogrebinska, both of whom will help them master their acting skills for the next challenge. Each contestant is then asked to improvise a scene with one of the actors, with the most convincing contestant winning the challenge. Ola has some issues with the setting, being reminded of the time she spent in juvenile hall. Ultimately, Natalia and Andre are chosen as the winners. As their prize, both are granted the opportunity to receive a visit from their loved ones.

- Challenge winners: Andre Whyte & Natalia Gulkowska

For the photo shoot session the contestants are taken to a mansion where they are paired up to portray the throes of love and death. Ola has a hard time with her fatalistic attitude, as well as taking direction, while Natalia and Michael struggle to gel well together due to their heavy dislike for one another.

Pairs
Jakob & Magda
Karolina G. & Sebastian
Andre & Ola
Karolina P. & Samuel
Kamila & Radek
Michael & Natalia

At panel, Marcin Perchuć sits as the fifth judge. Natalia and Michael are the first paired to be judged, and both receive praise from the judges. Natalia is deemed to have done better of the two, and is granted immunity. Karolina G. is told she outshone Sebastian in their photo, and is also given immunity. Kamila, Magda, Andre and Karolina P. are also declared immune, with the other six contestants facing elimination.

- Immune from elimination: Andre Whyte, Kamila Ibrom, Karolina Gilon, Karolina Pisarek, Magda Stępień-Kolesnikow & Natalia Gulkowska

Jakob, Michael, Ola, Radek, Samuel and Sebastian have their photos evaluated more thoroughly. Samuel is criticized because of his anal attitude and lack of flexibility due to his religion. Michael is praised due to his improvement, while Radek is critiqued due to his lack of height and runway potential. Jakob is judged on his cockiness. Ola and Sebastian are critiqued for failing to improve and stand out. When the models are called back, Joanna announces that two people will be eliminated from the competition. The immune contestants are called first during elimination, with Natalia receiving the best photo overall. Jakob, Ola and Sebastian land together in the bottom three, and Jakob is saved due to the strength of his past performances.

- First call-out: Natalia Gulkowska
- Bottom three: Jakob Kosel, Ola Ławnik-Sadkowska & Sebastian Zawiliński
- Eliminated: Ola Ławnik-Sadkowska & Sebastian Zawiliński
- Featured photographers: Adam Balcerek (Challenge) & Kajus Pyrz (photo shoot)
- Special guests: Tomasz Oświęcinski, Marta Sędzicka, Michalina Strabel, Michał Baryza, Katarzyna Zapasnik, Marcin Perchuć & Julia Pogrebinska
- Guest judge: Marcin Perchuć

=== Episode 7 ===
Original airdate: October 19, 2015

- Immune from elimination: Andre Whyte, Karolina Gilon, Magda Stępień-Kolesnikow, Natalia Gulkowska & Radek Pestka
- Challenge winner: Magda Stępień-Kolesnikow
- First call-out: Andre Whyte
- Bottom two: Michael Mikołajczuk & Samuel Kowalski
- Eliminated: Michael Mikołajczuk
- Featured photographer: Robert Wolański
- Special guests: Kasia Struss
- Guest judge: Kasia Struss

=== Episode 8 ===
Original airdate: October 26, 2015

Pairs
Andre
Kamila & Samuel
Karolina G. & Radek
Karolina P. & Natalia
Jakob & Magda

- Challenge winner: Magda Stępień-Kolesnikow
- First call-out: Magda Stępień-Kolesnikow & Jakob Kosel
- Bottom two: Natalia Gulkowska & Radek Pestka
- Originally eliminated: Natalia Gulkowska
- Featured photographer: Alexander Lipkin
- Guest judge: Ania Jurgaś

=== Episode 9 ===
Original Airdate: November 2, 2015

- Challenge winner: Karolina Gilon
- Challenge winner: Karolina Pisarek
- First call-out: Radek Pestka
- Bottom two: Magda Stępień-Kolesnikow & Natalia Gulkowska
- Originally eliminated: Magda Stępień-Kolesnikow
- Quit: Natalia Gulkowska

=== Episode 10 ===
Original Airdate: November 9, 2015

- Challenge winner: Karolina Pisarek
- First call-out: Karolina Pisarek
- Bottom three: Andre Whyte, Kamila Ibrom & Magda Stępień-Kolesnikow
- Eliminated: Andre Whyte & Kamila Ibrom

=== Episode 11 ===
Original Airdate: November 16, 2015

- Challenge winner: Magda Stępień-Kolesnikow
- First call-out: Karolina Pisarek
- Bottom two: Radek Pestka & Samuel Kowalski
- Eliminated: Samuel Kowalski

=== Episode 12 ===
Original Airdate: November 23, 2015

- Challenge winner: Karolina Gilon
- First call-out: Jakob Kosel
- Bottom three: Karolina Gilon, Magda Stępień-Kolesnikow & Radek Pestka
- Eliminated: Karolina Gilon & Magda Stępień-Kolesnikow

=== Episode 13 ===
Original Airdate: November 30, 2015

- Final three: Jakob Kosel, Karolina Pisarek & Radek Pestka
- Eliminated: Jakob Kosel
- Final two: Karolina Pisarek & Radek Pestka
- Poland's Next Top Model: Radek Pestka

== Summaries ==
=== Call-out order ===
Order	Episodes										
Order	4	5	6	7	8	9	10	11	12	13	
1	Jakob	Radek	Natalia	Andre	Magda; Jakob	Radek	Karolina P.	Karolina P.	Jakob	Radek	Radek
2	Radek	Magda	Magda	Natalia	Magda; Jakob	Samuel	Jakob	Jakob	Karolina P.	Karolina P.	Karolina P.
3	Karolina P.	Natalia	Karolina P.	Karolina G.	Karolina P.	Jakob	Samuel	Karolina G.	Radek	Jakob	
4	Sebastian	Jakob	Karolina G.	Radek	Samuel	Andre	Karolina G.	Magda	Karolina G. Magda		
5	Andre	Andre	Kamila	Magda	Kamila	Karolina G.	Radek	Radek	Karolina G. Magda		
6	Ola	Karolina P.	Andre	Karolina P.	Andre	Kamila	Magda	Samuel			
7	Jagoda	Karolina G.	Michael	Kamila	Karolina G.	Karolina P.	Andre; Kamila				
8	Magda	Kamila	Radek	Jakob	Radek	Natalia	Andre; Kamila				
9	Samuel	Michael	Samuel	Samuel	Natalia	Magda					
10	Natalia	Samuel	Jakob	Michael							
11	Karolina G.	Sebastian	Ola; Sebastian								
12	Michael	Ola	Ola; Sebastian								
13	Kamila	Jagoda									
14	Justyna										

The contestant was eliminated
The contestant was immune from elimination
The contestant was originally eliminated, but was saved
The contestant quit the competition
The contestant won the competition

- Episodes 1, 2 and 3 were casting episodes. In episode 3, the pool of semi-finalists was reduced to the final 14 models who moved on to the main competition.
- Episodes 6, 10 and 12 featured double eliminations with the bottom three contestants being in danger of elimination.
- In episodes 6 and 7, the best-performing contestant from each photo shoot pair was deemed immune at panel.
- In episode 4, Joanna revealed that mentor Michał Pirog would be granted the opportunity to save one contestant from elimination at any point in the competition.
- In episode 8, Magda and Jakob received best photo as a pair. Both were asked to decide who the better performing contestant was, agreeing it had been Magda. Natalia was originally eliminated when she landed in the bottom two with Radek, but Michał decided to save her from being eliminated.
- In episode 9, Magda was originally eliminated when she landed in the bottom two with Natalia. When Natalia decided to quit, Magda was allowed to remain in the competition.

=== Photo shoot guide ===
- Episode 3 photo shoot: Lakeside group shots (semifinals)
- Episode 4 photo shoot: 50s army fashion with parachutes
- Episode 5 photo shoot: Own choice; naked or with insects
- Episode 6 photo shoot: Love and death in pairs
- Episode 7 photo shoot: Glamour sport editorial
- Episode 8 photo shoot: Swimwear in pairs in the Dead Sea
- Episode 9 photo shoot: Recreating childhood photos
- Episode 10 photo shoot: Covered in powder and honey
- Episode 11 photo shoot: Posing with monkeys in a mangrove swamp
- Episode 12 photo shoot: Editorial in Cần Thơ's floating market
- Episode 13 photo shoot: Glamour magazine covers & spreads in Lanzarote

== Post–Top Model careers ==
- Justyna Łopian did not pursue modeling after the show.
- Jagoda Judzińska signed with Embassy Models. She has taken a couple of test shots and modeled for Mr. Gugu & Miss Go, Mohito PL, Baleo PL, Land of Change by Piechocka, O.N.E Fashion, Łukasz Jemioł, Gosia Strojek SS17, Perilla Lingerie,... She has appeared on magazine cover and editorials for Businesswomen&life June 2016, CKM #4 April 2018,... and walked in fashion shows of Maciej Zien, Angelika Jozefczyk, La Roue Fashion, Gavel SS16, Just Paul, Acephala Fashion, Pilawski, Warsaw Concept Store, Anna Cichosz FW17,... Beside modeling, Judzińska has appeared in music video "Amber" by Slums Attack ft. Beteo.
- Ola Ławnik-Sadkowska signed with Yako Models. She has taken a couple of test shots and walked in fashion shows of Versace, Salvatore Piccione,... She has appeared on magazine cover and editorials for Lounge #79 March 2016, Elegant US June 2016, Imperium Kobiet #21 January 2017, Vogue March 2018,... and modeled for Jolie Su, S.Moriss, Xana Collection, Anna Cichosz Wizerunkownia, Velpa PL, Happymum PL, HelloBody Germany,... Beside modeling, Ławnik-Sadkowska is also the ambassador of Alite Clinic and Moliera2.
- Sebastian Zawiliński signed with Avant Models, X Management, Most Wanted Models in Munich and Beyond Models in Milan. He has taken a couple of test shots and modeled for Conhpol Shoes, Male-Me PL, Gomez Fashion Store, Born2be PL, Giacomo Conti, Eobuwie PL, Eastend PL, Basiclo Wear, Kross Bikes,... He has appeared on magazine cover and editorials for Warsawholic January 2016, The Dapifer US #1 January 2016, Law Business Quality January 2017, Obvious Magazine May 2017, Men's Health February 2022, Twoj Styl March 2023,... and walked in fashion shows of Guess, Moncler, Sono Idoni, Rage Age, Maurizio Benttoni, Mariusz Przybylski FW16.17, Cifonelli FW18,...
- Michael Mikołajczuk signed with Avant Models, Art Room Model Management in Istanbul and Faze Models in Berlin. He has taken a couple of test shots and walked in fashion show for Denley PL FW16. He has modeled for Lacoste, Łukasz Jemioł, Giacomo Conti, Ecer Collezioni Turkey, Alsiva urkiye, Iggy Morris, Denley PL, Bolf PL, Cossack PL, Lamanuel Man, 888sport,...
- Natalia Gulkowska signed with Avant Models and EC Management. She has taken a couple of test shots and appeared on magazine editorials for Hiro July 2017. She has modeled for Waleria Tokarzewska-Karaszewicz SS16, Moie Jewelry, Misbhv PL, Alilla Cosmetics,... Gulkowska retired from modeling in 2018.
- Andre Whyte signed with United For Models. He has taken a couple of test shots and modeled for Chaos by Marta Boliglova, Robert Kupisz FW15.16, Oshee Vitamin, Ibuprom Sport,... He has appeared on magazine editorials for Mustache Paper #6 December 2015, Kaltblut Germany December 2015, Gentleman December 2015, Viva January 2016, Cosmopolitan February 2016,... and walked in fashion shows of Timberland, New Balance, Gino Rossi, Lavard, Wittchen, Kazar,... Whyte retired from modeling in 2018.
- Kamila Ibrom signed with Avant Models, United For Models, The Management PL, Linden Staub Talent Agency in London, Ace Models in Athens and Nologo Management in Milan. She has taken a couple of test shots and walked in fashion shows of Jacob Birge Vision, Michał Zieliński, Sono Idoni, Bizuteria Yes, Solar PL, Nikola Fedak, Yaron Minkowski, Aleksandra Jendryka, Dvojka PL,... She has modeled for Floating Jeans PL SS19, She Ain't Bielizna, Wear Medicine, Osman Yousefzada FW21, Ode to Socks Greece SS22, Access Fashion Greece SS22,... and appeared on magazine editorials for Solis US January 2016, Nakid US February 2016, Elegant US February 2016, Coco Indie US #4 August 2016, Elléments US November 2016, Contributor Germany July 2020, Kaltblut Germany September 2020, The Glass UK April 2021, Roll Up US #6 April 2021, Sicky Spain March 2022, Gala Greece May 2022, Vogue Arabia August 2022,...
- Samuel Kowalski signed with EC Management, SD Models and The Face Models in Paris. He has taken a couple of test shots and appeared on magazine cover and editorials for Whitemad August 2016. He has modeled for Answear SS16 and walked in fashion shows of Sono Idoni, Robert Kupisz, Próchnik PL,... Kowalski retired from modeling in 2018.
- Karolina Gilon has taken a couple of test shots and walked in fashion shows of Puma, Van Hoyden,... She has modeled for H&M, Puma, Reserved, L'Oreal, Paprocki Brzozowski, Sheila PL, Annomalia PL, Durex,... and appeared on magazine cover and editorials for Glamour, Cosmopolitan, Hot Moda, Lounge #77 December 2015, Joy #2 February 2016, Hiro May 2016, Grazia Italia June 2017, Resuer Italia #15 February 2018, Be Active #4 April 2018, Shape #8 August 2018, Rekt South Africa October 2018, K Mag #101 September–October 2020,... Beside modeling, she has appeared in several music videos such as "Cichosza" by Marcin Macuk ft. Krzysztof Zalewski, "Fake Love" by Smolasty ft. Białas,... and also pursuing television presenter career, which she had been the host in Love Island. Wyspa miłości, Ninja Warrior Polska,...
- Magda Stępień-Kolesnikow has taken a couple of test shots and walked in fashion show for Impresa Di Lusso SS17. She has modeled for Modlishka PL, A&G Moda Damska, Daniel Jacob Dali, Dressap PL, Sheila PL, Furelle Official Store, Ezuri PL FW16.17, Gena PL FW16.17, Gemini Park Tarnów,... She retired from modeling in 2018.
- Jakob Kosel signed with Avant Models, AS Management,Two Management in Los Angeles, Book Management in Toronto, Agents Model Management in Prague, Modelwerk in Hamburg, Citizen Management in Berlin, Metro Model Management in Zürich, New Madison Models in Paris, The Squad Management in London, Crew Model Management & 2Morrow Model Management in Milan. He has taken a couple of test shots and modeled for Hugo Boss, Reserved, Adidas, Vistula PL, Apart Jewellery, Cropp Denim SS16, One Step France, Robert Kupisz, Denley PL Fall 2016, Sklep Ryłko FW16.17, Sabrina Pilewicz, House Brand PL SS18, Paprocki Brzozowski SS18, Kazar FW18.19 Bielenda PL, Huawei, Tic Tac, Pepsi, Durex,... He has appeared on magazine cover and editorials for Glamour, Cosmopolitan, Elle Men, Fucking Young! Spain April 2016, Uroda Życia August 2016, Men's Fitness France August 2016, Vulkan US November 2016, Hot Moda #4 April 2018, Zwierciadło September 2018, K Mag #106 September–October 2021,... and walked in fashion shows of Triumph, 4F, Paul & Shark, Puma, Guess, Nike, Jack Wolfskin, Robert Kupisz, Vistula PL, Łukasz Jemioł, Dawid Wolinski SS17, Mariusz Przybylski FW17.18, Lidia Kalita FW17.18, Bizuu Fashion SS18, Maurizio Benttoni, S'portofino,...
- Karolina Pisarek signed with Avant Models, Selective Management, MC2 Model Management in Tel Aviv, Munich Models in Munich, Fabbrica Milano Management in Milan, D Model Agency in Athens, Francina Models in Barcelona, Wilhelmina Models in London, Freedom Models in Los Angeles, Muse Model Management in New York City, State Management in Los Angeles & New York City, The Source Models & Next Management in Miami. She has taken a couple of test shots and walked in fashion shows of Mikoh US Resort 2019, Guess SS21,... She has appeared on magazine cover and editorials for Glamour, Joy, Fashion PL, Hot Moda, Viva!, Elle Greece March 2016, K Mag #80 March–April 2016, Elegant US #22 March 2016, Hiro #52 June 2016, Avanti #2 February 2017, Leon Japan July 2017, Be Active #9 September 2017, Harper's Bazaar Greece November 2017, Shape #3 March 2018, Viva Moda September 2019, Harper's Bazaar Türkiye July 2021,... and modeled for Pantene, Sephora, Bruno Banani, Reserved, Juicy Couture, Dee Zee Shoes, Lou PL, La Mania, Apart Jewellery, Mohito PL Spring 2016, Robert Kupisz FW15.16, Viola Piekut, Sugarfree PL, Naoko Store, Sinsay FW16.17, Monstre Déesse China FW16, Kontigo, Secret Lashes PL, Anya Maj, Just Paul FW17, Tikto Athens SS18, Sabrina Pilewicz, Vitkac PL, Orsay PL, Bonprix, Obagi Clinical US, Mylaq PL, Coca-Cola, Huawei, Cien Lidl, Bold Japan,... Beside modeling, Pisarek competed as a contestant on several shows such as Ameryka Express 2020, Twoja twarz brzmi znajomo 2022, Taniec z Gwiazdami 2022,... and is also the global ambassador of Pantene, Calzedonia and Daniel Wellington.
- Radek Pestka has collected his prizes and signed with Avant Models. He is also signed with Panda Models, Embassy Models and Modelscout in Shanghai. He has taken a couple of test shots and walked in fashion shows of MMC Studio Design FW16, Jacob Birge Vision FW16, Paprocki Brzozowski SS17, Guy Tang Hair Show,... Pestka has appeared on magazine cover and editorials for Glamour, Kaltblut Germany January 2016, Avanteen #1 February–April 2016, Neo2 Spain February 2016, Vulkan US April 2016, The Spoiler's Hand US October 2016, Hiro #55 May 2017, Elle July 2017, L'Officiel Hommes August 2018, Replika #76 November–December 2018,... and modeled for Levi's, Adidas, Zuo Corp +, Synthetic100%natural, Maks Miuk, Jaga Hupało, Mientus Germany SS17, H&M SS17, Bartmanska, Molto PL, Hatup Design SS21, Vitkac, Momu PL,... Beside modeling, he has begun pursuing a music career as a DJ and appeared in several music videos such as "Aureola" by Reni Jusis, "To Do Pana" by Ofelia Iga Krefft,...
