= Top Model (Polish TV series) season 4 =

Top Model
- Season 4
- No. of episodes: 13

Release
- Original network: TVN
- Original release: 1 September – 24 November 2014

Season chronology
- ← Previous; Cycle 3 Next → Cycle 5

Top Model, cycle 4 is the fourth cycle of an ongoing reality show based on Tyra Banks' America's Next Top Model that pits contestants from Poland against each other in a variety of competitions to determine who will win the title of the next Polish Top Model.

The competition was hosted by Polish-born model Joanna Krupa who served as the lead judge alongside fashion designer Dawid Woliński, fashion show director Kasia Sokołowska and photographer Marcin Tyszka. This was the first season of the show to feature male contestants in the cast.

Among the prizes are a lucrative modeling contract with NEXT Model Management as well as an appearance on the cover of the Polish issue of Glamour and 100,000 złotys (US$30,000). The campaign with Max Factor featured in previous cycles has been dropped.

This season introduced the Winner's Room, which was awarded to the winner of each episode's judging panel.

The international destinations this cycle were Lisbon and Puerto del Rosario. The winner of the competition was 20-year-old Osi Ugonoh from Gdańsk.

== Auditions ==
The auditions for season four took place from June 15 to June 27, 2014, in the cities of Gdańsk, Poznań, Katowice and Warsaw.

City	Venue	Audition
Gdańsk	Ołowianka	June 15
Poznań	—N/a	June 19
Katowice	—N/a	June 21
Warsaw	Wilanów Palace	June 27

== Contestants ==
(ages stated are at start of contest)

Contestant	Age	Height	Hometown	Finish	Place
Karolina Kaczyńska	21	1.72 m (5 ft 7 1/2 in)	Sławków	Episode 4	13
Michał Kaszyński	20	1.87 m (6 ft 1 1/2 in)	Swarzędz	Episode 5	12
Aleksandra 'Ola' Grzegorczyk	21	1.79 m (5 ft 10 1/2 in)	Końskie	Episode 6	11
Adam Boguta	19	1.92 m (6 ft 3 1/2 in)	Górecko	Episode 7	10
Mateusz Maga	22	1.82 m (5 ft 11 1/2 in)	Jarosław	Episode 8	9
Paulina 'Misza' Czumaczenko	26	1.73 m (5 ft 8 in)	Kraków	Episode 9	8
Ewelina Pachucka	23	1.78 m (5 ft 10 in)	Jastrzębie-Zdrój	Episode 10	7
Aleksandra 'Ola' Żuraw	21	1.79 m (5 ft 10 1/2 in)	Lubin	Episode 11	6
Michalina Strabel	19	1.74 m (5 ft 8 1/2 in)	Dąbrowa	Episode 11	5
Mateusz Jarzębiak	22	1.93 m (6 ft 4 in)	Rabka-Zdrój	Episode 12	4
Marta Sędzicka	20	1.77 m (5 ft 9 1/2 in)	Szczecin	Episode 13	3
Michał Baryza	22	1.89 m (6 ft 2 1/2 in)	Koneck	Episode 13	2
Osuenhe 'Osi' Ugonoh	20	1.80 m (5 ft 11 in)	Gdańsk	Episode 13	1

== Episodes ==
=== Episode 1 ===
Original Air Date: September 1, 2014

For the first time, the judges scout for both male and female model hopefuls to take part in the competition. The first round of auditions is held in Wilanow palace.

=== Episode 2 ===
Original Air Date: September 8, 2014

The second round of audition begins, and the pool of hopefuls who will participate in the semi-finals boot camp increases.

=== Episode 3 ===
Original Air Date: September 15, 2014

Final casting episode. The semifinalists take part in an inaugural runway show before being subjected to the first a round of eliminations. Later, they experience the very first photo shoot of the season. At elimination, only thirteen models are selected into the final cast.

Group	Models	Theme
**One**	**Asia, Dominika T**, **Martyna R**, Mateusz M, Michał K, Michalina, Ola Ż	Castaways
**Two**	**Agata**, **Dominika R**, **Marcin**, **Martyna K**, Michał B, Osi	Surfers
**Three**	Adam, **Angela**, Mateusz J, Ola G, Misza, **Piotr**	Fishermen
**Four**	**Alan**, **Daria G**, **Daria S**, Ewelina, Karolina, Marta, **Robert**	Socialites

- Names in **bold** represent eliminated semi-finalists

=== Episode 4 ===
Original Air Date: September 22, 2014

Before moving into their new home, the contestants are put to the test with their very first challenge - walking down the runway on revolving platforms. Most of the women fail to cross the entire way without falling, with the exception of Marta. Most of the male models stumble before crossing the entire way. Due to her agility on the catwalk, Marta is deemed as the winner of the challenge.

- Challenge Winner: Marta Sędzicka

Afterwards, the finalists are immediately driven to their new homes. For having won the challenge, Marta is allowed to pick two contestants who will be the first to enter the house with her while the rest of the models are forced to wait outside. She chooses Ola Z. and Michał K. The following day, makeovers take place. Ola Z. and Marta have the most trouble accepting their makeovers.

For the photo shoot the models must pose in a slaughter house while they wear pieces of meat as garments incorporated into their outfits. They are overseen by judges Michał Pirog and Joanna Krupa. Marta, Michał B, Michalina, Misza and Osi all perform well on set. Ewelina feels uncomfortable posing with the meat, while Adam's repeated stabbing of one of the carcasses upsets Joanna. Michał K. and Mateusz M. struggle the most, both finding it hard to come up with natural and diverse poses.

At panel, Michał B. receives the best photo. Meanwhile, Adam, Ola and Karolina are called forward as the bottom three. Ola and Adam are declared safe, and Karolina is eliminated from the competition.

- First call-out: Michał Baryza
- Bottom three: Adam Boguta, Ola Żuraw & Karolina Kaczyńska
- Eliminated: Karolina Kaczyńska
- Featured photographer: Krzysztof Wyżyński
- Special guests: Agnieszka Maciąg
- Guest judge: Ania Jurgaś

=== Episode 5 ===
Original Air Date: September 29, 2014

Theme	Contestants
Wind	Adam, Ewelina, Mateusz M, Marta, Ola G, Osi
Water	Mateusz J, Michał B, Michał K, Michalina, Misza, Ola Z

- Challenge Winner: Michalina Strabel
- Challenge Winner: Mateusz Jarzębiak & Osi Ugonoh

Pairs
Dressed	Naked
Adam	Misza
Ola Z.	Ewelina
Marta	Michał K.
Mateusz M.	Mateusz J.
Ola G.	Michalina
Osi	Michał B.

- Immune: Marta Sędzicka, Mateusz Maga, Michalina Strabel, Misza Czumaczenko, Ola Żuraw & Osi Ugonoh
- First call-out: Osi Ugonoh
- Bottom two: Ola Grzegorczyk & Michał Kaszyński
- Eliminated: Michał Kaszyński
- Featured photographer: Robert Wolański
- Special guests: Ewa Chodakowska, Anatol Modzelewski
- Guest judge: Zuza Bijoch

=== Episode 6 ===
Original Air Date: October 6, 2014

The contestants return home from the previous elimination to find a note from Michal K. written on the bathroom mirror. The models suggest that the message 'stop staring at the mirror' was directed at Mateusz M. Several of the contestants believe that Mateusz should have been eliminated instead of Michał. They continue to lay into him at dinner later that night.

For the challenge, the contestants must walk on the runway with clothing from three different designers. After being interviewed by them, they must guess what articles of clothing they are wearing belong to which designer. Mateusz M and Ewelina are able to match all of the clothes with the right designer, but it is Ewelina who is revealed to be the challenge winner.

- Challenge Winner: Ewelina Pachucka

The following day, the models are taken to a landfill for their photo shoot. Ola Z, Ewelina, Marta, Misza, and Osi all do well. Mateusz M. is asked to look less feminine in his photos, while Mateusz J. is asked to look more elegant. Michalina and Ola G struggle most.

At panel, Ewelina, Mateusz M, Misza, and Marta all receive positive feedback. Adam is chastised for the 'lack of fashion' in his photo. Michalina and Ola G receive the most negative critiques. During elimination, Misza is awarded best photo. Michalina and Ola G. land in the bottom two. Joanna hands the last photo to Michalina, who is saved due to her strong previous performances, while Ola G. is asked to leave the competition.

- First call-out: Misza Czumaczenko
- Bottom two: Michalina Strabel & Ola Grzegorczyk
- Eliminated: Ola Grzegorczyk
- Featured photographer: Adam Plucinski
- Special guest: Tony Ward, Adrian Włodarski
- Guest judge: Tony Ward

=== Episode 7 ===
Original Air Date: October 13, 2014

- Challenge Winner: Ola Żuraw
- Challenge Winner/Immune: Marta Sędzicka

Pairs
Adam & Michalina
Ewelina & Mateusz J.
Marta & Mateusz M.
Misza & Michal
Osi & Ola Ż

- Immune: Ewelina Pachucka, Marta Sędzicka, Mateusz Jarzębiak, Misza Czumaczenko & Ola Żuraw
- First call-out: Ola Żuraw
- Bottom two: Adam Boguta & Michalina Strabel
- Eliminated: Adam Boguta
- Featured photographer: Krzysztof Opaliński
- Guest judge: Kamila Szczabińska

=== Episode 8 ===
Original Air Date: October 20, 2014

- First call-out: Marta Sędzicka
- Bottom three: Ewelina Pachucka, Mateusz Maga & Misza Czumaczenko
- Eliminated: Mateusz Maga
- Featured photographer: Emil Biliński
- Special guest: Zosia Ślotała
- Guest judge: Przemysław Saleta

=== Episode 9 ===
Original Air Date: October 27, 2014

- First call-out: Michał Baryza
- Bottom three: Mateusz Jarzębiak, Michalina Strabel & Misza Czumaczenko
- Eliminated: Misza Czumaczenko
- Featured photographer: Lara Jade
- Special guest: Barbara Kurdej-Szatan, Wojciech Brzozowski
- Guest judge: Kinga Rusin

=== Episode 10 ===
Original Air Date: November 3, 2014

- First call-out: Osi Ugonoh
- Bottom three: Ewelina Pachucka, Michalina Strabel & Michał Baryza
- Eliminated: Ewelina Pachucka
- Featured photographer: Marcin Tyszka
- Guest judge: Bar Refaeli

=== Episode 11 ===
Original Air Date: November 10, 2014

- Eliminated outside of judging panel: Ola Żuraw
- First call-out: Marta Sędzicka
- Bottom two: Mateusz Jarzębiak & Michalina Strabel
- Eliminated: Michalina Strabel
- Featured photographer: Mario Principe
- Guest judges: Anja Rubik, Michał Piróg

=== Episode 12 ===
Original Air Date: November 17, 2014

- First call-out: Marta Sędzicka
- Bottom two: Mateusz Jarzębiak & Osi Ugonoh
- Eliminated: Mateusz Jarzębiak

=== Episode 13 ===
Original Air Date: November 24, 2014

- Final three: Marta Sędzicka, Michał Baryza & Osi Ugonoh
- Eliminated: Marta Sędzicka
- Final two: Michał Baryza & Osi Ugonoh
- Poland's Next Top Model: Osi Ugonoh
- Guest Judge: Kasia Struss

== Summaries ==
=== Call-out order ===
Joanna's call-out order
Order	Episodes											
Order	3	4	5	6	7	8	9	10	11	12	13	
1	Mateusz J.	Michał B.	Osi	Misza	Ola Ż.	Marta	Michał B.	Osi	Marta	Marta	Michał B.	Osi
2	Ola G.	Marta	Misza	Ewelina	Ewelina	Michał B.	Osi	Ola Ż.	Osi	Michał B.	Osi	Michał B.
3	Adam	Michalina	Ola Ż.	Marta	Mateusz J.	Ola Ż.	Ola Ż.	Marta	Michał B.	Osi	Marta	
4	Misza	Misza	Mateusz M.	Osi	Misza	Osi	Marta	Mateusz J.	Mateusz J.	Mateusz J.		
5	Karolina	Mateusz J.	Michalina	Mateusz M.	Marta	Mateusz J.	Ewelina	Michał B.	Michalina			
6	Ewelina	Osi	Marta	Michał B.	Osi	Michalina	Michalina	Michalina	Ola Ż.			
7	Marta	Ola G.	Michał B.	Ola Ż.	Mateusz M.	Ewelina	Mateusz J.	Ewelina				
8	Michał B.	Ewelina	Adam	Mateusz J.	Michał B.	Misza	Misza					
9	Osi	Michał K.	Ewelina	Adam	Michalina	Mateusz M.						
10	Michał K.	Mateusz M.	Mateusz J.	Michalina	Adam							
11	Mateusz M.	Ola Ż.	Ola G.	Ola G.								
12	Michalina	Adam	Michał K.									
13	Ola Ż.	Karolina										

The contestant was eliminated
The contestant was immune from elimination
The contestant was eliminated outside of judging panel
The contestant won the competition

- Episodes 1, 2 and 3 were casting episodes. In episode 3, the pool of semi-finalists was reduced to the final 13 models who moved on to the main competition.
- Episodes 4, 8, 9 and 10 featured the bottom three contestants were in danger of elimination.
- In episode 5, Marta, Mateusz M, Michalina, Misza, Ola Ż and Osi were granted immunity from elimination at panel for having performed the best in their pair for the shoot.
- In episode 7, Marta was granted immunity as a result of having won the reward challenge. Ewelina, Mateusz J, Misza, Ola Ż (and once again Marta), were granted immunity from elimination at panel.
- In episode 11, the contestants had a casting challenge with Anja Rubik. Immediately after the challenge was over, Anja revealed that she had deemed Ola Ż to have been the worst. She was eliminated outside of judging panel as a result.

=== Photo shoot guide ===
- Episode 3 photo shoot: Beach scenarios in groups (Semifinals)
- Episode 4 photo shoot: Glamour in a Slaughterhouse
- Episode 5 photo shoot: Dressed and naked in Pairs
- Episode 6 photo shoot: Fashion in a junkyard
- Episode 7 photo shoot: Fiat 500 advertisements in pairs in the scenery of Toruń
- Episode 8 photo shoot: Wild West battles
- Episode 9 photo shoot: Equestrian fashion with a horse
- Episode 10 photo shoots: Editorials by Marcin Tyszka; posing with Bar Refaeli
- Episode 11 photo shoot: Funeral fashion editorial
- Episode 12 photo shoot: Fashion in the streets of Lisbon
- Episode 13 photo shoot: Glamour magazine covers & spreads in Fuerteventura

== Post–Top Model careers ==
- Karolina Kaczyńska signed with D'Vision Model Management. She has taken a couple of test shots and appeared on magazine editorials for Joy February 2015. She retired from modeling in 2016.
- Michał Kaszyński signed with Hunter Models Agency, AS Management and F Models International in Jakarta. He has taken a couple of test shots and walked in fashion show for Feby Haniv Pour Homme FW17. He has modeled for Yum Yummy Store PL, Eif Store PL SS16, Czayka Design, Matahari Indonesia, Rani Hatta, Wellborn Company Indonesia,... and appeared on magazine editorials for Da Man Indonesia FW17.18, Esquire Indonesia December 2017,... Kaszyński retired from modeling in 2019.
- Ola Grzegorczyk signed with D'Vision Model Management. She has taken a couple of test shots and walked in fashion show for Roberta Kupisza. She retired from modeling in 2019.
- Adam Boguta signed with D'Vision Model Management, Uncover Models, Quest Artists & Models in Hong Kong, Face Model International in Taipei, Image Models in Tokyo, Brave Model Management in Milan, PRM Agency in London, Citizen Management in Oslo, Francina Models in Barcelona and Mega Model Agency in Berlin. He has taken a couple of test shots and modeled for Diesel, Reebok, Nike, Levi's, Le Coq Sportif, Giordano International Taiwan, Project Mess PL, Mr. Gugu & Miss Go, Moiselle Hong Kong FW15, 80/20 Hong Kong FW15, Harp Team Summer 2016, Jack & Jones, Indice Studio Taiwan, Net Fashion Taiwan, Jaga Hupało, Diamante Wear, Prosto Wear, Mass Denim 98, Giacomo Conti, Lee Europe SS19, 4F SS19, Intimatus Taiwan, Złote Tarasy, Sogo Hong Kong, Bosideng Taiwan, Heineken, Panasonic,... He has appeared on magazine cover and editorials for Men's Health, Yoho! Boy Hong Kong, Elegeant January 2015, Kaltblut Germany February 2015, Tao Hong Kong September 2015, East Touch Hong Kong October 2015, Chasseur September 2016, Institute US January 2018, GQ Japan September 2018,... and walked in fashion shows of Guess, Demo Hong Kong SS16, PolyU Hong Kong SS16, Mariusz Przybylski, Daniel Wong FW18,... Beside modeling, he has competed as a contestant on Love Island. Wyspa miłości 2023 and also pursuing a music career which he had release several singles.
- Mateusz Maga signed with D'Vision Model Management, Mango Models, Embassy Models, MSA Models in New York City, IMG Models in Paris, Exit Model Management in Bratislava, Profile Models & Named Models in London, Joy Model Management, Brave Model Management & Wonderwall Management in Milan. He has taken a couple of test shots and modeled for Topshop, The Body Shop UK, Secret Lashes PL, Marta Twarowska, Fudge Professional UK, KMS Hair,... He has appeared on magazine cover and editorials for Fashion PL #1 Spring 2015, Design Scene June 2015, Synzine UK September 2015, Vulkan US December 2015, Kaltblut Germany April 2015, Alice US March 2016, HUF US August 2017, Switch Italia December 2017,... and walked in fashion shows of Marta Twarowska, Sergei Grinko SS16, Vfiles FW16, Hardeman FW16, Collina Strada FW16, Catch Michelle FW16, Nika Tang FW16, Di Liborio SS17, Marta Jakubowski SS17, Edda Gimnes SS17, Cimone SS17, Sorapol SS17, Morecco SS17, Peet Dullaert SS17, Sartorial Monk FW18.19, Ying Sheng Education SS20, IA London SS20, Two Point Two Studio FW20, DB Berdan FW20,... Beside modeling, Maga has competed as a contestant on Agent – Gwiazdy 2017 and also pursuing a music career which he had release several singles.
- Misza Czumaczenko signed with D'Vision Model Management, Unique Agency, WMM Models & Magnum Model Management in Milan. She has taken a couple of test shots and appeared on magazine cover and editorials for CKM, Make-Up Trendy, Wesele, Exclusive Info #19 Summer 2015, Elléments US April 2015, Dusty Argentina April 2015, Solis US #14 May 2015, Imperium Kobiet #17 July 2015, Elegant July 2015, Offset #10 November 2015, Didaskalia #130 December 2015, Digital Camera Polska December 2015, Playboy Croatia #222 January 2016, Fashion World Saudi Arabia June 2016, Modellenland Belgium #16 October 2016, Moda-Ślub #2 Spring 2017, Scorpio Jin US #1 April 2019,... She has modeled for Flove PL, Mo.Ya fashion, La Roue Fashion FW15.16, Wear Medicine, Wild Rabbit Lingerie, Oku Aku, Diesre Turkey, Tozlu Turkey, Noktateyn Turkey, Samsun Turkey, Answear, Barla by Anna Bartula FW16, Didaldi, Supersklep PL, Imperial Store PL, Signific PL, Venus Club Italia, Porta d'Oro Night Club Italia,... and walked in fashion shows of Confashion Clothes, Mia Manufacture, Coco Giovanna, Bruno Nowi SS15, Ela Olszewska, Helmy Paris, Django Steenbakker, Christina Bobkova, Agnes Wuyam, Łukasz Verra Couture, Endorfina Wear, Juliette K. Fashion,... Beside modeling, Czumaczenko has also represented Russia compete on Princess of the World 2016 and appeared in several music videos such as "C2C" by Kartky & Emes Milligan, "Strzygi" by Snowid ft. Kipikasza,... She retired from modeling in 2020.
- Ewelina Pachucka signed with D'Vision Model Management. She has taken some test shots, modeled for Momidesign and appeared on magazine cover and editorials for Premium PL #2 February 2015. She retired from modeling in 2016.
- Ola Żuraw signed with D'Vision Model Management and Uncover Models. She has taken a couple of test shots and walked in fashion shows of Bartmanska, Angelika Jozefczyk,... She has appeared on magazine cover and editorials for Joy, Elegant September 2015, Institute UK March 2016, Live & Travel PL July 2016,... and modeled for Cropp, Sephora, Mr. Gugu & Miss Go, O.N.E Fashion PL, Waleria Tokarzewska SS16, Wearso Organic, Gosia Strojek SS17, Kontigo, Aleksandra Markowska, Coca-Cola,... Żuraw retired from modeling in 2020.
- Michalina Strabel signed with D'Vision Model Management, MMG Models in Dubai, Promod Model Agency in Hamburg, L'Agence Models in Lisbon, Vip Models in Paris, Ice Models & Wonderwall Management in Milan. She has taken a couple of test shots and walked in fashion shows of Harvey Nichols, Guess, Yousef Al Jasmi SS15, Madiyah Al Sharqi SS15,... She has appeared on magazine cover and editorials for Marie Claire Arabia, Haya UAE, Elle France March 2015, Hot Moda March 2015, Grazia Middle East April 2015, The Cartel UAE #3 Summer 2015, Ahlan! UAE April 2015, Tuba #11 February 2016, Claudia April 2017, Harper's Bazaar Kolekcje SS18, Dreamingless UK April 2019, Selin Netherlands June 2022,... and modeled for Kas Kryst SS15, Ence Pence PL, Twisted Roots UAE, Bouguessa UAE Ramadan/Cruise 2015, MMC Studio Design, Mohito PL, Indigo Nails France, Puccini PL, Molton PL, Manzzano FW18.19, Mia Manufacture, Bialcon PL SS19, Modivo PL, Dr. Irena Eris, Emoi Fashion SS20,... Beside modeling, Strabel is also one of the models on Project Runway Poland 2015.
- Mateusz Jarzębiak signed with D'Vision Model Management, Respect Models in Istanbul and Auraa Talents in Mumbai. He has taken a couple of test shots and appeared on magazine editorials for Vogue India October 2018, Fashion PL Summer 2022,... He has walked in fashion shows of Vistula PL, Mimika Studio, Pawo PL,... and modeled for Wojas, Dawid Koczy, Aztorin Watches, Apart Jewellery, Flawless PL, Ozonee PL, Semilac PL, Tom & Rose, Vizard Men's Fashion, Vagad’s India, Bombay Shirt Company India, Hoff Jeans India, Seca Odzież Motocyklowa, Wall's Turkey, Costa Coffee, Suzuki,... Beside modeling, Jarzębiak has competed on Mister Polski 2017 and appeared in several music videos such as "Ona wyjątkowa" by Non Stop, "Milion słów" by Jula, "Mogę być tylko Twoja" by Nastja Ołdak, "Tańcz Moja Mała" by Claris & Sequence, "Najpiękniejsza z Dam" by Łukasz Waluś,... He retired from modeling in 2020.
- Marta Sędzicka signed with D'Vision Model Management. She has taken a couple of test shots and appeared on magazine cover and editorials for Be PL February 2015, Superior Germany March 2015, Mustache Paper #4 May 2015, Elle June 2015, Vogue Portugal July 2015, Playboy August 2015, Modo Magazine December 2015, Glamour October 2016, Moda-Ślub #2 Spring 2019,... She has modeled for Dior, Reebok, G Look SS16, Jaga Hupało, Tomaotomo, Just Unique Atelier, Mimka PL FW17, Prima Moda Shoes, T-Mobile PL,... and walked in fashion shows of Maciej Zien, Ewa Minge, Bohoboco, Tomaotomo, MMC Studio Design, Łukasz Jemiol, The Cadess, La Mania SS15, Michał Szulc, Maciek Sieradzky, Paprocki Brzozowski, Jaga Hupało, Jacob Birge Vision, Gavel SS16, Waleria Tokarzewska FW16.17, Ptaszek Atelier, Milita Nikonorov Summer 2017, Jarosław Ewert FW17, Chantal Thomass, Susan Sport, Samochód Roku Playboya,... Beside modeling, Sędzicka is also the winning model of Project Runway Poland 2015.
- Michał Baryza signed with Specto Models and Major Model Management in Milan & New York City. He has taken a couple of test shots and modeled for Project Mess PL, Giacomo Conti SS15, Łukasz Jemiol, King Size PL SS17, T-Mobile PL, Black Energy Drink,... He has appeared on magazine cover and editorials for CKM December 2014, Chasseur March 2015, Elegant #11 April 2015, Glamour Man April 2015, Le Mile Germany April 2015, Gentleman #5 May 2015, Kaltblut Germany May 2015, Joy July 2015, Eks PL #28 July–August 2015, K Mag September 2015, Glamour October 2015, Make-Up Trendy October 2016, Hiro February 2017, Fashion PL #2 May 2018, Volant Germany #11 October 2018, Noisy Rain Mexico #68 March–April 2022,... and walked in fashion shows of Triumph, Moschino, 4F, Nike, Dawid Wolinski, Tru Trussardi, Próchnik PL, Vistula PL, Gomez PL, MMC Studio Design, Łukasz Werra Couture, Łukasz Jemiol FW15, Paprocki Brzozowski, Rage Age, Mariusz Przybylski, Gavel SS16, Maciek Sieradzky, Paul & Shark FW17.18, Daks London, Van Graaf, S'portofino,... Beside modeling, Baryza has competed as a contestant on several shows such as Lip Sync Battle. Ustawka, Ninja Warrior Polska, One Night Squad,...
- Osi Ugonoh has collected her prizes, though she didn't signed with Next Management but with D'Vision Model Management, Chili Models, Fashion Cult Models in Athens, 4Play Model Management in Hamburg and D&A Model Management in Cape Town. She has modeled for Adidas, Maybelline, Levi's, Nike, H&M, Zalando, T.K. Maxx, Pantene, Chaos by Marta Boliglova, Mohito PL SS15, Apart Jewellery Summer 2015, MMC Studio Design, Bartek Janusz, Jaga Hupało, Marry Me PL, Puma SS16, Project Mess PL, Me Gusta PL, DK by Dorota Kuźnicka, Karolina Seeger, NC Nails Company, Valentino Voce Viva, Zaquad, Kontigo,... and walked in fashion shows of Triumph, Puma, Guess, Maciej Zien, Gavin Rajah, Hector & Karger, Łukasz Jemiol SS15, La Mania SS15, Teresa Kopias, Bohoboco FW15.16, Joanna Klimas FW15, Bizuu Fashion, Mariusz Przybylski, Ezuri PL, Ptak Fashion City, MMC Studio Design FW16, Patryk Wojciechowski, Pinko Boutique SS18, Niumi PL FW18, Bebe Clothing, Ania Wendzikowska, DK by Dorota Kuźnicka SS23,... Ugonoh has appeared on magazine cover and editorials for Glamour, Miasto Kobiet, Hiro #46 December 2014, Avanteen #1 March 2015, Kurier Fryzjerzy #3 May 2015, Flesz Trendy #1 April 2015, Glamour Man April 2015, InStyle June 2015, Imperium Kobiet #17 July 2015, Viva January 2016, Wysokie Obcasy #12 March 2016, Avanti July 2016, Harper's Bazaar May 2017, Jet Club South Africa August 2017, Wesele #48 Winter 2017-Spring 2018, Elléments US February 2018, Vogue March 2018, L'Officiel March 2018, Paznokcie #90 January 2019, Fashion PL Spring 2019, Imirage Canada January 2020, Unghie e Belleza September 2020, Elle October 2021, Gmaro France April 2023,... Beside modeling, she has appeared in music video "Kobiety są siłą" by Angelika Anozie and competed as a contestant on Hell’s Kitchen 2022.
