= Top Model (Polish TV series) season 7 =

Top Model
- Season 7
- No. of episodes: 13

Release
- Original network: TVN
- Original release: September 3 – November 26, 2018

Season chronology
- ← Previous; Season 6 Next → Season 8

Top Model, cycle 7 is the seventh cycle of an ongoing reality television series based on Tyra Banks' America's Next Top Model that pits contestants from Poland against each other in a variety of competitions to determine who will win the title of the next Polish Top Model.

Joanna Krupa, who also serves as the lead judge, returned to host the seventh cycle. Other judges included fashion designer Dawid Woliński, fashion show director Kasia Sokołowska and photographer Marcin Tyszka. This is the fourth season of the show to feature male contestants.

Among the prizes for the season are a contract with D'vision Model Management, an appearance on the cover of the Polish issue of Glamour, 100,000 złotys (US$30,000) and a campaign for About You.

The international destinations this cycle were Sölden, Los Angeles, Antananarivo and Hamburg.

The winner of the competition was 22 -year- old Katarzyna 'Kasia' Szklarczyk from Bukowno

== Contestants ==
(Ages stated are at start of contest)

Contestant	Age	Height	Hometown	Finish	Place
Julia Frankowicz	18	1.80 m (5 ft 11 in)	Wrocław	Episode 4	14
Natalia Gorączka	20	1.75 m (5 ft 9 in)	Poznań	Episode 5	13
Ange-Sophie 'Sophie' Reich	16	1.75 m (5 ft 9 in)	Hamburg, Germany	Episode 6	12-11
Franciszek 'Franek' Strąkowski	26	1.91 m (6 ft 3 in)	Toruń	Episode 6	12-11
Żaklina Ta Dinh	24	1.72 m (5 ft 7 1/2 in)	Jelenia Góra	Episode 8	10
Piotr Muszyński	29	1.91 m (6 ft 3 in)	Gdańsk	Episode 9	9
Szymon Reich	21	1.82 m (5 ft 11 1/2 in)	Czeladź	Episode 10	8-7
Oliwia Zasada	19	1.73 m (5 ft 8 in)	Warsaw	Episode 10	8-7
Daria Dąbrowska	18	1.67 m (5 ft 5 1/2 in)	Sędziszów Małopolski	Episode 11	6
Michał Borzuchowski	17	1.88 m (6 ft 2 in)	Żmijewo-Trojany	Episode 12	5-4
Magdalena 'Magda' Przybielska	20	1.79 m (5 ft 10 1/2 in)	London, United Kingdom	Episode 12	5-4
Anna 'Ania' Markowska	26	1.74 m (5 ft 8 1/2 in)	Warsaw	Episode 13	3
Hubert Gromadzki	20	1.86 m (6 ft 1 in)	Rzeszów	Episode 13	2
Katarzyna 'Kasia' Szklarczyk	22	1.80 m (5 ft 11 in)	Bukowno	Episode 13	1

== Episodes ==
=== Episode 1 ===
Original airdate: September 3, 2018

Auditions for the seventh season of Top Model begin, and aspiring hopefuls are chosen for the semi-final round.

=== Episode 2 ===
Original airdate: September 10, 2018

In the semi-finals, the judges begin to eliminate contestants to narrow the number of models who will battle it out for a place in the final fourteen.

=== Episode 3 ===
Original airdate: September 17, 2018

In the third and final casting episode of the season, the judges choose the finalists who will move onto the main competition out of the remaining pool of contestants.

Group	Models
**One**	Ania, **Dominik**, Franek, Oliwia, **Piotr**, **Weronika**, Żaklina
**Two**	**Anna**, **Gabriela**, **Kamil**, Piotr M., **Sara**, Szymon, **Violet**
**Three**	Ange Sophie, **Bartek**, **Darek**, Hubert, Kasia, **Luiza**, Magda
**Four**	Daria, **Iwona**, Julia, **Laura**, Michał, **Natalia**, Natalia G.,

- Names in **bold** represent eliminated semi-finalists

=== Episode 4 ===
Original airdate: September 24, 2018

- Challenge winner: Ania Markowska
- Immune from elimination: Ania Markowska, Kasia Szklarczyk, Magda Przybielska, Michał Borzuchowski, Oliwia Zasada, Piotr Muszyński & Żaklina Ta Dinh
- First call-out: Oliwia Zasada
- Bottom three: Franek Strąkowski, Julia Frankowicz & Natalia Gorączka
- Eliminated: Julia Frankowicz
- Featured photographers: Adam Pluciński, Jacek Kołodziejski
- Special guests: Małgorzata Rozenek-Majdan
- Guest judge: Robert Biedroń

=== Episode 5 ===
Original airdate: October 1, 2018

- Challenge winner: Kasia Szklarczyk
- First call-out: Daria Dąbrowska
- Bottom three: Franek Strąkowski, Oliwia Zasada & Natalia Gorączka
- Eliminated: Natalia Gorączka
- Featured photographer: Sonia Szóstak
- Special guests: Ewa Grzelakowska-Kostoglu, Maria Konarowska, Michał Mikołajczak
- Guest judge: Anja Rubik

=== Episode 6 ===
Original airdate: October 8, 2018

- Challenge winners: Magda Przybielska & Hubert Gromadzki
- First call-out: Magda Przybielska
- Bottom three: Ange-Sophie Reich, Franek Strąkowski & Oliwia Zasada
- Eliminated: Ange-Sophie Reich & Franek Strąkowski
- Featured photographer: Rafał Makieła
- Special guests: Jakob Kosel
- Guest judge: Zuzanna Bijoch & Mariusz Przybylski

=== Episode 7 ===
Original airdate: October 15, 2018

- Challenge winner: Daria Dąbrowska, Oliwia Zasada & Szymon Reich
- Immune from elimination: Daria Dąbrowska & Hubert Gromadzki, Kasia Szklarczyk, Oliwia Zasada & Piotr Muszyński
- First call-out: Daria Dąbrowska & Hubert Gromadzki
- Bottom three: Ania Markowska, Szymon Reich & Żaklina Ta Dinh
- Originally eliminated: Żaklina Ta Dinh
- Featured photographer: Piet Truhlar
- Special guests: Julia Wieniawa & Paweł Księżopolski
- Guest judge: Anna Jurgaś & Sasha Knezevic

=== Episode 8 ===
Original airdate: October 22, 2018

- Challenge winner: Kasia Szklarczyk, Hubert Gromadzki & Ania Markowska
- Immune from elimination: Kasia Szklarczyk
- First call-out: Oliwia Zasada
- Bottom three: Piotr Muszyński, Magda Przybielska & Żaklina Ta Dinh
- Eliminated: Żaklina Ta Dinh
- Featured photographer: Adam Pluciński
- Special guests: Michał Baryza, Osi Ugonoh & Daniel Tracz
- Guest judge: Marta Dyks

=== Episode 9 ===
Original airdate: October 29, 2018

- First challenge winner: Kasia Szklarczyk
- Second challenge winner: Oliwia Zasada
- First call-out: Daria Dąbrowska
- Bottom three: Kasia Szklarczyk, Oliwia Zasada & Piotr Muszyński
- Eliminated: Piotr Muszyński
- Featured photographer: Łukasz Pęcak
- Featured director: Monika Kmita
- Special guests: Valentina Lozovskaya, Stefano Sala, Veronique Droulez, Maja Salamon, Pat Boguławski, Karolina Gruszecka, Patryk Bogusławski
- Guest judge: Filip Niedenthal

=== Episode 10 ===
Original airdate: November 5, 2018

- Challenge winner: Magda Przybielska
- First call-out: Ania Markowska
- Bottom three: Daria Dąbrowska, Oliwia Zasada & Szymon Reich
- Eliminated: Oliwia Zasada & Szymon Reich
- Featured photographer: Marcin Tyszka
- Special guests: Joanna Przetakiewicz
- Guest judge: Joanna Przetakiewicz

=== Episode 11 ===
Original airdate: November 12, 2018

- Challenge winner: Kasia Szklarczyk & Michał Borzuchowski
- First call-out: Hubert Gromadzki
- Bottom three: Ania Markowska, Kasia Szklarczyk & Daria Dąbrowska
- Eliminated: Daria Dąbrowska
- Featured photographer: Art Brewer
- Guest judge: Erik Rosete

=== Episode 12 ===
Original airdate: November 19, 2018

- First call-out: Kasia Szklarczyk
- Bottom three: Ania Markowska, Magda Przybielska & Michał Borzuchowski
- Eliminated: Magda Przybielska & Michał Borzuchowski
- Featured photographer: Jack Guy
- Guest judge: Walter Mendez & Ryan Patros

=== Episode 13 ===
Original airdate: November 26, 2018

- Final three: Ania Markowska, Hubert Gromadzki & Kasia Szklarczyk
- Eliminated: Ania Markowska
- Final two: Hubert Gromadzki & Kasia Szklarczyk
- Poland's Next Top Model: Kasia Szklarczyk
- Featured photographer: Gosia Turczyńska, Iza Grzybowska, Magnus Lechner
- Guest judge: Anja Rubik

== Results ==
Order	Episodes										
Order	3 (Note: Episodes 1, 2 and 3 were casting episodes. In episode 3, the pool of semi-finalists was reduced to the final 14 models who moved on to the main competition.)	4	5	6	7 (Note: In episode 7, Żaklina was originally eliminated, but mentor Michał Pirog, who'd been granted the opportunity of bringing one eliminated contestant back into the competition, decided to save her.)	8	9	10	11	12	13
1	Sophie	Oliwia	Daria	Magda	Daria; Hubert	Oliwia	Daria	Ania	Hubert	Kasia	Kasia
2	Magda	Michał	Hubert	Hubert	Daria; Hubert	Daria	Ania	Kasia	Magda	Hubert	Hubert
3	Kasia	Piotr	Michał	Michał	Oliwia	Ania	Hubert	Michał	Michał	Ania	Ania
4	Hubert	Żaklina	Magda	Kasia	Kasia	Hubert	Szymon	Hubert	Ania	Magda; Michał	
5	Natalia	Ania	Ania	Szymon	Piotr	Szymon	Magda	Magda	Kasia	Magda; Michał	
6	Daria	Kasia	Szymon	Piotr	Michał	Michał	Michał	Daria	Daria		
7	Michał	Magda	Żaklina	Daria	Magda	Kasia	Kasia	Oliwia; Szymon			
8	Julia	Hubert	Piotr	Ania	Ania	Piotr	Oliwia	Oliwia; Szymon			
9	Szymon	Daria	Sophie	Żaklina	Szymon	Magda	Piotr				
10	Piotr	Sophie	Kasia	Oliwia	Żaklina	Żaklina					
11	Oliwia	Szymon	Franek	Franek; Sophie							
12	Żaklina	Franek	Oliwia	Franek; Sophie							
13	Franek	Natalia	Natalia								
14	Ania	Julia									

The contestant was immune from elimination
The contestant was eliminated
The contestant was originally eliminated but was saved.
The contestant won the competition

=== Photo shoot guide ===
- Episode 3 photo shoot: Group shots (semifinals)
- Episode 4 photo shoot: 7 Sins of the modern world
- Episode 5 photo shoot: Nude in a garden
- Episode 6 photo shoot: Posing underwater
- Episode 7 photo shoot: Spy agents on the Central Alps
- Episode 8 photo shoot: Baroque party madness
- Episode 9 motion shoot: Fashion film for Vogue Polska
- Episode 10 photo shoots: Posing topless covered in powder; natural beauty portraits
- Episode 11 photo shoot: Venice beach editorial
- Episode 12 photo shoot: Los Angeles desert couture
- Episode 13 photo shoots: Glamour covers, Apart Jewelry campaign, About you

== Post–Top Model careers ==
- Julia Frankowicz signed with D'vision Model Management, Heroin Models, The One Models Management in Milan and Unn Model Management in Cairo. She has taken a couple of test shots and walked in fashion shows of Dawid Woliński, Versace, Pinko, Jack Wolfskin, Gerry Weber, S'portofino, Bizuu Fashion, Lidia Kalita, Solar PL, Van Graaf, Hector & Karger, Elisabetta Franchi, The Archivia Fall 2022, Menouba FW22.23, Oblique Creations FW22, Francesca Liberatore FW22.23, Thelma Espina SS23, Dalida Ayach, Keqiao Spring 2024, Martino Midali SS25, Miss Bikini Luxe SS25,...
- Natalia Gorączka signed with D'vision Model Management. She has taken a couple of test shots and walked in fashion show for Łukasz Jemioł. She has appeared on magazine editorials for Polo Market Winter 2018, Fashion PL March 2019,... and modeled for Lefon PL, Gomez Fashion Store, SI Lingerie,...
- Franek Strąkowski signed with D'vision Model Management. He has taken a couple of test shots, modeled for Apart Jewellery, Bonus MG,... and appeared on magazine editorials for Fashion PL March 2019, Miasto Kobiet March 2019,... He retired from modeling in 2020.
- Sophie Reich signed with Uncover Models, One Management in New York City, Raya Models in Landshut, Focus Model Management in Prague, Mega Model Agency & Modelwerk in Hamburg, Body London Model Agency & Linden Staub Talent Agency in London. She has taken a couple of test shots and appeared on magazine cover and editorials for Maxima Germany April 2022, Brigitte Mom Germany January 2023,... She has modeled for eBay, Inglot Cosmetics, Kérastase, New Balance, Monki PL, Bella Misteria, Birkenstock Germany, Feba PL, Cantu Beauty PL, One for Five UK, Sinsay, Vosedo PL, MandM Germany, Oceansapart Germany. Beside modeling, Reich is also appeared in a role of the movie #Jestem M. Misfit,...
- Żaklina Ta Dinh signed with Chili Models and Modelwerk in Hamburg. She has taken a couple of test shots and walked in fashion shows of Honko Store, Mo.Ya Fashion,... She has modeled for Maybelline, Adidas, Lou PL, Marilyn PL SS19, NC Nails Company, Żaneta Barbarewicz, Lilou Jewelry, Etam France,... and appeared on magazine cover and editorials for Paznokcie, Make-Up Trendy #4 December 2019, Aperture Collective US September 2020,... Beside modeling, Ta Dinh is also appeared in a guest role in the TV series Friends.
- Piotr Muszyński signed with D'vision Model Management. He has modeled for Gomez Fashion Store and appeared on magazine editorials for Varsovie February 2019. He has taken a couple of test shots and walked in fashion shows of Mariusz Przybylski SS19, Maurizio Benttoni, Robert Kupisz, Synthetic 100% Natural FW21,... Muszyński retired from modeling in 2021.
- Oliwia Zasada signed with Chili Models. She has taken a couple of test shots and appeared on magazine editorials for Surreal US #557 July 2019. She has modeled for Constance Carroll Cosmetics, Rest Factory PL, Outside Society PL, Golden Cars PL,... Zasada retired from modeling in 2022.
- Szymon Reich signed with Charme De La Mode Agency. He has taken a couple of test shots and walked in fashion show for Atelier Rosa. He has modeled for Apart Jewellery, Lou PL, Marilyn PL SS19, Normani Swimsport Germany, Born2be PL, Ariel,... Beside modeling, Reich has competed on Hotel Paradise 2020 and also pursue a career as a singer under the name "QoQos". He retired from modeling in 2021.
- Daria Dąbrowska signed with Gaga Models and EC Management. She has taken a couple of test shots and modeled for Apart Jewellery, Jolly Vintage,... She has appeared on magazine cover and editorials for K Mag #96 March 2019, Arteon #4 April 2019, Kunst US August 2019, Glamour August 2019, Panna Młoda June 2020, Aperture Collective US #2 September 2020, Coeval Italia December 2021, Make Sense US #9 March 2022,...
- Magda Przybielska signed with D'vision Model Management. She has taken a couple of test shots and appeared on magazine editorials for Shuba US January 2019. She has modeled for Apart Jewellery, You Don't Want This Life, Chanel Joan Elkayam,... and walked in fashion shows of Dawid Woliński, Jatin Kalikas Armour, Chanel Joan Elkayam,... Przybielska retired from modeling in 2020.
- Michał Borzuchowski signed with AS Management, X Management, DYC Models Management in Beijing, CY Model Management in Shanghai, Image Models in Tokyo, PRM Agency in London, Select Model Management in Paris, Independent Model Management & The Lab Models in Milan. He has taken a couple of test shots and modeled for Apart Jewellery, Vann Jewellery SS20, Casablanca Paris, Basiclo, Martin Plan,... He has appeared on magazine cover and editorials for Men's Uno China, Vogue España July 2019, Mława Life July 2019, Chic China August 2019, Numéro Homme France March 2020, Fassion Korea #7 SS22, Pap Italia September 2023, Pap Korea September 2023,... and walked in fashion shows of Zegna FW20.21, Juun.J FW20.21, Casablanca Paris FW20, Rynshu FW20, Pigalle Paris FW20, Miguel Vieira SS22, David Catalán SS22, INXX SS23,... Beside modeling, Borzuchowski has appeared in music video "Menago" by Izabela Zabielska.
- Ania Markowska signed with D'vision Model Management and AS Management. She has taken a couple of test shots and walked in fashion shows of Etam France, Elisabetta Franchi, Modivo PL SS21, Dawid Wolinski Resort 2023,... She has appeared on magazine editorials for Fashion PL March 2019, K Mag #102 December 2020 - January 2021, Flanelle Canada January 2021, Elle April 2022,... and modeled for L'Oreal, Fenty Beauty, Apart Jewellery, Motive & More, Peserico Italia, PLNY Lala, Etam France, Aura Hats Store, Mohito, Self Love PL FW23, Paprocki Brzozowski, Huawei,...
- Hubert Gromadzki signed with Specto Models, J Model Management in Seoul, Ave Management in Singapore, Mademoiselle Agency in Paris, Independent Model Management in Milan, Izaio Management in Berlin, MP Management in Stockholm, Two Management & Elite Model Management in Barcelona, MGM Models in Hamburg, Most Wanted Models in Munich, TFM Model Management & Heartbreak Management in Oslo. He has taken a couple of test shots and modeled for House, Cropp, New Balance, Maciej Zien, Apart Jewellery, Kazar, Transitions PL, Divarese Turkey, Big Star Jeans, VCentrum, Perła Miodowa,... He has appeared on magazine cover and editorials for Logo PL, K Mag, Day&Night #107 December 2018, Noblesse Korea December 2019, Men's Health March 2021, L'Officiel Baltic January 2022, The Peak Singapore November 2022, August Man Singapore December 2022,... and walked in fashion shows of Guess, Marc O'Polo, Nike, Basia Olearka, Maurizio Benttoni, Robert Kupisz, S'portofino, MMC Studio Design, Vistula PL, Van Graaf, Emporio Armani FW20, Giorgio Armani FW20, Ther Yang,... Beside modeling, Gromadzki is also competed in Mister World 2024.
- Kasia Szklarczyk has collected her prizes and signed with D'vision Model Management. She is also signed with Le Management in Hamburg, Metro Models in Zurich, Major Model Management in Milan and Genetic Models Management in Los Angeles. She has taken a couple of test shots and modeled for Esprit, Apart Jewellery, Esotiq, Sheila PL, Marilyn PL SS19, Orsay PL FW19, Marlu PL FW19, Paul Marciano FW19, Top Secret PL, Sugarfree PL, Wojas, Esser Bella Profumerie Italia, David Lo Presti, Mohito PL, Riva Yacht Italia,... Szklarczyk has appeared on magazine cover and editorials for Fashion PL, Glamour December 2018-January 2019, Schön! UK March 2019, Avanti #3 March 2020, Mój Pies i Kot February–March 2021,... and walked in fashion shows of Dawid Woliński, Paul Marciano, Jack Wolfskin, Guess, Calzedonia, Solar PL SS19, Vistula PL, S'portofino, Van Graaf, Niumi PL, MMC Studio Design SS20, Gosia Baczyńska, Maciej Zien SS23, Łukasz Jemioł FW23,... Beside modeling, she is also own an jewelry line called Glaris PL.

== Ratings ==
Episode	Date	Audience	Share 4+	Share 16–49
1	3 September	1 574 044	12.61%	17.79%
2	10 September	1 742 781	13.76%	22.37%
3	17 September	1 484 090	11.75%	17.13%
4	24 September	1 628 447	12.38%	18.22%
5	1 October	1 641 620	12.78%	20.04%
6	8 October	1 858 425	14.22%	19.89%
7	15 October	1 689 334	12.57%	19.30%
8	22 October	1 464 933	10.96%	16.82%
9	29 October	1 425 831	11.15%	17.47%
10	5 November	1 456 165	11.17%	17.39%
11	12 November	1 706 714	11.88%	18.27%
12	19 November	1 590 399	11.83%	18.12%
13	26 November	1 820 994	14.26%	21.10%
Average	2018	1 628 998	12.46%	18.84%
