= Top Model (Polish TV series) season 8 =

Top Model
- Season 8
- No. of episodes: 13

Release
- Original network: TVN
- Original release: September 2 – November 25, 2019

Season chronology
- ← Previous; Season 7 Next → Season 9

Top Model, cycle 8 is the eight cycle of an ongoing reality television series based on Tyra Banks' America's Next Top Model that pits contestants from Poland against each other in a variety of competitions to determine who will win the title of the next Polish Top Model.

Joanna Krupa, who also serves as the lead judge, returned to host the eight cycle. Other judges included fashion designer Dawid Woliński, fashion show director Kasia Sokołowska and photographer Marcin Tyszka. This is the fifth season of the show to feature male contestants.

Among the prizes for the season are a contract with Models Plus Management, an appearance on the cover of the Polish issue of Glamour, and 100,000 złotys (US$30,000).

This cycle introduced a completely new visual design, abandoning the previous logo based on the America's Next Top Model. In addition, this cycle introduced the Golden Ticket, which was awarded at the auditions to one participant who made the best impression on the judges. This participant skipped the boot camp stage and went straight to the Top Model house.

The international destinations this cycle were London, Moscow, Tel Aviv, Jerusalem, Istanbul, Morón. The winner of this competition was 20-year-old Dawid Woskanian from Kozy.

== Contestants ==
(Ages stated are at start of contest)

| Contestant | Age | Height | Hometown | Finish | Place |
|---|---|---|---|---|---|
| Radosław 'Radek' Czekański | 19 | 1.90 m (6 ft 3 in) | Bielawa | Episode 4 | 16 |
| Denis Chmielewski | 25 | 1.88 m (6 ft 2 in) | Groningen, Netherlands | Episode 5 | 15 (DQ) |
| Nikola Furman | 16 | 1.75 m (5 ft 9 in) | Rzeszów | Episode 6 | 14 (quit) |
| Magdalena 'Magda' Karwacka | 22 | 1.76 m (5 ft 9 1/2 in) | Warsaw | Episode 6 | 13 |
| Rafał Torkowski | 27 | 1.83 m (6 ft 0 in) | Gdańsk | Episode 7 | 12-11 |
| Kinga Dębska | 22 | 1.77 m (5 ft 9 1/2 in) | Frankfurt, Germany | Episode 7 | 12-11 |
| Marcin Chowaniak | 19 | 1.83 m (6 ft 0 in) | Ornatowice | Episode 8 | 10 |
| Klaudia Chojnacka | 19 | 1.70 m (5 ft 7 in) | Gdańsk | Episode 9 | 9 |
| Michał Gała | 22 | 1.86 m (6 ft 1 in) | Trzebiechów | Episode 10 | 8-7 |
| Anna 'Ania' Jaroszewska | 26 | 1.75 m (5 ft 9 in) | Łódź | Episode 10 | 8-7 |
| Kinga Wawrzyniak | 22 | 1.73 m (5 ft 8 in) | Kraków | Episode 11 | 6 |
| Klaudia El Dursi | 30 | 1.74 m (5 ft 8 1/2 in) | Bydgoszcz | Episode 12 | 5 |
| Sandra Dorsz | 19 | 1.80 m (5 ft 11 in) | Wysoczka | Episode 13 | 4 |
| Stanisław 'Staszek' Obolewicz | 26 | 1.85 m (6 ft 1 in) | Donetsk, Ukraine | Episode 13 | 3 |
| Olga Kleczkowska | 17 | 1.75 m (5 ft 9 in) | Radom | Episode 13 | 2 |
| Dawid Woskanian | 20 | 1.86 m (6 ft 1 in) | Kozy | Episode 13 | 1 |

== Episodes ==
=== Episode 1 ===
Original airdate: September 2, 2019

Auditions for the eighth season of Top Model begin, and aspiring hopefuls are chosen for the semi-final round.

=== Episode 2 ===
Original airdate: September 9, 2019

In the semi-finals, the judges begin to eliminate contestants to narrow the number of models who will battle it out for a place in the top model house.

- Golden ticket recipient: Klaudia El Dursi

=== Episode 3 ===
Original airdate: September 16, 2019

In the third and final casting episode of the season, the judges choose the finalists who will move onto the main competition out of the remaining pool of contestants.

| Group | Models |
|---|---|
| Beach | **Ania M.**, **Lara**, Michał G., **Ola**, **Natalia N.**, Rafał |
| Beach | **Bartosz**, **Matt**, **Michał S.**, **Natalia P.**, **Sara** |
| Concert | **Jack**, Magda, **Martyna**, **Mikolaj Ko.**, **Mikolaj Kr.**, **Natalia D.** |
| Concert | Denis, **Gley**, **Kuba**, Sandra |
| Skate park | **Antonina**, Dawid, Olga, **Pawel**, Radek |
| Skate park | **Jarek**, Klaudia C., Kinga W., Marcin, **Ola K.**, **Yulia** |
| Glamping | Ania J., **Kamil**, **Krystian**, **Krzyszek**, Nikola, Staszek |
| Glamping | **Dominika**, **Eryk**, **Janek**, **Kinga D.**, **Stanferd**, **Wanessa**, **Weronika** |

- Names in **bold** represent eliminated semi-finalists

=== Episode 4 ===
Original airdate: September 23, 2019

- First call-out: Klaudia El Dursi
- Bottom two: Nikola Furman & Radek Czekański
- Eliminated: Radek Czekański
- Guest judge: Magdalena Frackowiak
- Featured photographer: Marcin Tyszka

=== Episode 5 ===
Original airdate: September 30, 2019

- First challenge winner: Kinga Wawrzyniak
- Second challenge winners: Denis Chmielewski & Klaudia Chojnacka
- First call-out: Ania Jaroszewska
- Bottom three: Denis Chmielewski, Nikola Furman & Sandra Dorsz
- Disqualified: Denis Chmielewski
- Featured photographers: Łukasz Dziewic & Robert Wolanski
- Special guests: Julia Kuczyńska, Wujaszek Liestyle, Karolina Pisarek
- Guest judge: Kasia Struss

=== Episode 6 ===
Original airdate: October 7, 2019

- Challenge winner/Immune from elimination: Kinga Wawrzyniak
- Quit: Nikola Furman
- First call-out: Dawid Woskanian
- Bottom two: Magda Karwacka & Marcin Chowaniak
- Eliminated: Magda Karwacka
- Featured photographer: Marta Wojtal
- Guest judge: Anna Jagodzińska

=== Episode 7 ===
Original airdate: October 14, 2019

- Wildcard: Kinga Dębska
- Challenge winner: Olga Kleczkowska
- First call-out: Ania Jaroszewska & Staszek Obolewicz
- Bottom three: Kinga Dębska, Michał Gała & Rafał Torkowski
- Eliminated: Kinga Dębska & Rafał Torkowski
- Featured photographer: Magdalena Luniewska
- Featured directors: Piotr Książek & Szymon Dudka
- Special guests: Roksana Węgiel
- Guest judge: Michał Koterski, Natasza Urbańska

=== Episode 8 ===
Original airdate: October 21, 2019

- First challenge winners: Klaudia El Dursi & Sandra Dorsz
- Second challenge winners: Ania Jaroszewska, Kinga Wawrzyniak, Michał Gała & Staszek Obolewicz
- First call-out: Sandra Dorsz
- Bottom two: Marcin Chowaniak & Michał Gała
- Eliminated: Marcin Chowaniak
- Featured photographer: Iddo Lavie
- Guest judge: Ranita Sobanska

=== Episode 9 ===
Original airdate: October 28, 2019

- First challenge winner: Olga Kleczkowska
- Second challenge winners: Dawid Woskanian, Klaudia Chojnacka & Klaudia El Dursi
- First call-out: Kinga Wawrzyniak
- Bottom two: Klaudia Chojnacka & Olga Kleczkowska
- Eliminated: Klaudia Chojnacka
- Featured director: Piotr Onopa
- Featured photographer: Adam Plucinski
- Special guests: Daria Zawiałow

=== Episode 10 ===
Original airdate: November 4, 2019

- First challenge winners: Kinga Wawrzyniak & Staszek Obolewicz
- Second challenge winners: Ania Jaroszewska, Olga Kleczkowska & Staszek Obolewicz
- Booked for a job: Kinga Wawrzyniak (Vogue Polska)
- First call-out: Staszek Obolewicz
- Bottom three: Ania Jaroszewska, Klaudia El Dursi & Michał Gała
- Eliminated: Ania Jaroszewska & Michał Gała
- Featured photographers: Marcin Tyszka, Zuza Krajewska
- Special guests: Małgorzata Kożuchowska, Adam Boguta, Adam Niedźwiedź, Ania Markowska, Franek Strąkowski, Hubert Gromadzki, Kasia Szklarczyk, Patryk Grudowicz, Żaklina Ta Dinh

=== Episode 11 ===
Original airdate: November 11, 2019

- Challenge winners: Klaudia El Dursi & Staszek Obolewicz
- First call-out: Sandra Dorsz
- Bottom two: Kinga Wawrzyniak & Klaudia El Dursi
- Eliminated: Kinga Wawrzyniak
- Featured photographer: Osman Ozel

=== Episode 12 ===
Original airdate: November 18, 2019

- First call-out: Olga Kleczkowska
- Bottom three: Dawid Woskanian, Klaudia El Dursi & Staszek Obolewicz
- Eliminated: Klaudia El Dursi & Staszek Obolewicz
- Saved: Staszek Obolewicz
- Featured photographer: Mehmet Erzincan

=== Episode 13 ===
Original airdate: November 25, 2019

Scores (Note: In episode 13, Dawid and Olga are tied with a score of 5, and in the event that there's a tie the viewer's vote will be taken into consideration of a tie breaker making Dawid as the winner and Olga as the runner-up.)
| **Nº** | **Model** | **Jury** | **Viewers** | **Total** |
| **1** | Dawid | 2 | 3 | 5 |
| **2** | Olga | 3 | 2 | 5 |
| **3** | Staszek | 1 | 1 | 2 |

- Final four: Dawid Woskanian, Olga Kleczkowska, Sandra Dorsz & Staszek Obolewicz
- Eliminated: Sandra Dorsz
- Final three: Dawid Woskanian, Olga Kleczkowska & Staszek Obolewicz
- Poland's Next Top Model: Dawid Woskanian
- Featured photographers: Marcin Klaban, Jacek Bonecki, Łukasz Pęcak
- Finale host: Magda Mołek

== Results ==
| Order | Episodes | | | | | | | | | | | |
| Order | 3 (Note: Episodes 1, 2 and 3 were casting episodes. In episode 3, the pool of semi-finalists was reduced to the final 14 models who moved on to the main competition.) | 4 (Note: In episode 2, Klaudia E. was granted a ' Golden Ticket' and was therefore automatically granted a spot in the final cast.) | 5 (Note: In episode 5, Denis was disqualified for not participating in the photo shoot.) | 6 | 7 (Note: In episode 7, Kinga D. was brought back after being eliminated from the boot camp as a wild card.) | 8 | 9 | 10 | 11 | 12 (Note: In episode 12, Staszek was originally eliminated along with Klaudia E., but mentor Michał Pirog, who'd been granted the opportunity of bringing one eliminated contestant back into the competition, decided to save him.) | 13 | |
|---|---|---|---|---|---|---|---|---|---|---|---|---|
| 1 | Sandra | Klaudia E. | Ania | Dawid | Ania; Staszek | Sandra | Kinga W. | Staszek | Sandra | Olga | Dawid | Dawid |
| 2 | Ania | Kinga W. | Dawid | Sandra | Ania; Staszek | Ania | Klaudia E. | Kinga W. | Olga | Sandra | Olga | Olga |
| 3 | Dawid | Marcin | Klaudia C. | Michał | Olga | Klaudia E. | Staszek | Sandra | Dawid | Dawid | Staszek | Staszek |
| 4 | Denis | Olga | Marcin | Ania | Klaudia E. | Dawid | Dawid | Olga | Staszek | Staszek | Sandra | |
| 5 | Magda | Staszek | Olga | Staszek | Sandra | Klaudia C. | Michał | Dawid | Klaudia E. | Klaudia E. | | |
| 6 | Olga | Dawid | Rafał | Kinga W. | Klaudia C. | Kinga W. | Ania | Klaudia E. | Kinga W. | | | |
| 7 | Radek | Klaudia C. | Klaudia E. | Olga | Kinga W. | Staszek | Sandra | Ania; Michał | | | | |
| 8 | Marcin | Magda | Staszek | Klaudia C. | Dawid | Olga | Olga | Ania; Michał | | | | |
| 9 | Klaudia C. | Denis | Michał | Klaudia E. | Marcin | Michał | Klaudia C. | | | | | |
| 10 | Rafał | Sandra | Kinga W. | Rafał | Michał | Marcin | | | | | | |
| 11 | Staszek | Rafał | Magda | Marcin | Kinga D. Rafał | | | | | | | |
| 12 | Michał | Ania | Sandra | Magda | Kinga D. Rafał | | | | | | | |
| 13 | Kinga W. | Michal | Nikola | Nikola | | | | | | | | |
| 14 | Nikola | Nikola | Denis | | | | | | | | | |
| 15 | | Radek | | | | | | | | | | |

The contestant was immune from elimination
The contestant was eliminated
The contestant was disqualified
The contestant quit the competition
The contestant was originally eliminated but was saved.
The contestant won the competition

=== Photo shoots ===
- Episode 3 photo shoot: Group shots (semifinals)
- Episode 4 photo shoot: Jumping on a trampoline
- Episode 5 photo shoot: Nude in ice
- Episode 6 photo shoot: Folk village
- Episode 7 video shoot: Roller disco
- Episode 8 photo shoot: Tourists in Israel
- Episode 9 photo shoot: Photo shoot with family
- Episode 10 photo shoot: Vogue Polska
- Episode 11 photo shoot: Streets of Istanbul
- Episode 12 photo shoot: Istanbul creek
- Episode 13 photo shoots: Glamour covers, Apart Jewelry campaign, Peugeot car ads

== Post–Top Model careers ==
- Radek Czekański has taken a couple of test shots and appeared on magazine editorials for Lucy's US March 2020. He retired from modeling in 2021.
- Denis Chmielewski did not pursue modeling after the show.
- Nikola Furman has taken a couple of test shots and modeled for Maqtt PL, Street Style 24, Rimmi Candle,... She has appeared on magazine cover and editorials for Horizont US February 2020, Hiro October 2020, Imirage Canada July 2021,... She retired from modeling in 2023.
- Magda Karwacka has taken a couple of test shots, walked in fashion show for Susan Sport PL and modeled for Paprocki Brzozowski, Deezee PL, Coca-Cola,... Beside modeling, she has appeared on music video "Kreski" by Smolasty and competed on Love Island. Wyspa miłości 2020. She retired from modeling in 2022.
- Kinga Dębska signed with Modelroom Agency in Berlin. She has taken a couple of test shots and appeared on magazine editorials for Varsovie December 2019. Beside modeling, she has appeared on music video "Was Für Ein Traum" by Ciyo51. Dębska retired from modeling in 2022.
- Rafał Torkowski has taken a couple of test shots and walked in fashion shows of Matrix Hair, Węgrzyn Fashion,... He has modeled for Eastend PL, Warsaw Saints, Rest Factory, Big Star Shoes, True Color by Ann, Pawo PL, Efancy PL, Guns & Tuxedos, Street Style 24, Lama Design PL,... and appeared on magazine editorials for Icons Mexico December 2019, Mademoiselle December 2019, Trendy Szczecin January 2020,... Beside modeling, he has appeared on music video "Nie Mów Mi" by Eni Ostrowska and also competed in Ninja Warrior Polska.
- Marcin Chowaniak signed with Model Plus Management and X Management. He has taken a couple of test shots and modeled for Big Star Shoes Pre-Spring 2021. He has appeared on magazine editorials for Shuba US September 2020, Hiro October 2020, Oczy January 2021, Huf US March 2021,... Chowaniak retired from modeling in 2022.
- Klaudia Chojnacka signed with Embassy Models and Boom Models Agency in Milan. She has walked in fashion shows of BezAle PL, Lik Dorota, Ismena Studio, Honko Store Spring 2024,... and modeled for Maciej Zien, Reebok, House, Eastend PL, Ebutik PL, Express.ed Store, Utabaga Store, Innwolf PL, Ismena Studio, Hotel Quadrille,... She has taken a couple of test shots and appeared on magazine cover and editorials for Hiro, Mademoiselle January 2020, Lśnienie #8 March 2020, Varsovie April 2020, Féroce Scotland April 2020, Malvie France July 2020, Elegant US September 2020, Skye Canada #9 November 2020, Fuerte! December 2020, Prestiż #3 March 2021, Ossma Russia #18 April 2021, Off Town US #13 November 2021, Selin Netherlands March 2022, Untold Greece September 2023, Dominante France #4 October 2023, Artells US January 2024,..
- Ania Jaroszewska signed with Model Plus Management. She has taken a couple of test shots, modeled for Reserved, Maybelline, Yope Soap, Hermetic Square, Samsung,... and walked in fashion shows of MMC Studio Design SS20, Guess FW20.21, High Everyday Couture FW20, Apart Jewellery FW20, Patrizia Aryton FW20, Liu Jo FW20, Robert Kupisz FW20,...
- Michał Gała has modeled for Betclic and walked in fashion shows of Dawid Woliński, Nike, Synthetic 100% Natural FW20.21,... He retired from modeling in 2021.
- Kinga Wawrzyniak has taken a couple of test shots, modeled for Apart Jewellery Winter 2019 and appeared on magazine editorials for Vogue December 2019. Beside modeling, she has starred in the TV series Na Wspólnej. She retired from modeling in 2021.
- Klaudia El Dursi has modeled for Apart Jewellery Winter 2019, Mat Lingerie SS20, Lou PL, Marilyn PL, Verona Jewellery, Mustela PL, Coca-Cola,... and appeared on magazine cover and editorials for Party, Viva!, Fakt TV March–April 2020,... Beside modeling, she is also the host of dating show Hotel Paradise and starred in the movie "Pokusa".
- Sandra Dorsz signed with Avant Models, Selective Management, MMG Models in Dubai, D Model Agency in Athens, Munich Models in Munich, Fashion Model Management in Milan and Flash Model Management in Istanbul. She has taken a couple of test shots and appeared on magazine editorials for Gentleman #3-4 March–April 2020, Malvie France May 2021, Haute Punch Canada December 2021, Scorpio Jin US August 2023, K Mag May 2024, Glamour April 2025,... She has modeled for Apart Jewellery Winter 2019, Sheila PL, Just Unique PL, Notino PL, Sloggi PL, Musthave Company PL, Marella Italia, Oneness Clothing UAE, Ounass UAE, Mohito PL, Barbara Rizzi Atelier, Framesi Italia, Fay Brand Italia, Gaudì Italia SS25, Neonail, Molton Styl, AA Cosmetics, Pink Woman Greece, Be A Bee Couture Greece FW25.26,... and walked in fashion shows of Dawid Woliński, Pinko, Valentin Yudashkin, Chopard, MMC Studio Design SS20, Dorota Kuźnicka, DeVu Lingerie, Deni Cler Milano, Rami Kadi, J. Salinas FW25.26, Nissa Official FW25, Barbara Rizzi SS26, Luisa Spagnoli SS26,... Beside modeling, Dorsz is also competed on Love Island. Wyspa miłości 2023.
- Staszek Obolewicz has worked under his real name "Stanislaw" and signed with Model Plus Management, Rebel Models, NCM Models in Berlin, Cool Model Management in Istanbul, Independent Model Management in Milan, Blare Model Management in Barcelona, Scout Models in Kuala Lumpur and Now Model Management in Singapore. He has taken a couple of test shots and appeared on magazine editorials for Gmaro France, Glamour August–September 2020,... He has walked in fashion shows of The Melium Group, Bernard Chandran, Van Graaf FW20, Robert Kupisz FW20, Guess FW20.21, Marc O'Polo FW20, S'portofino FW20, Synthetic 100% Natural FW20.21, Private Stitch, Fizi Woo, Q Menswear, Ther Yang Studio,... and modeled for New Balance, Maciej Zien, Skechers, Asics Singapore, Apart Jewellery, Ryłko 1964, The Chain Vintage, Gomez Fashion Store, Robert Kupisz, Mont Brand PL, Ploumanac'h Italia, Zack Roman, Marcello Store PL, Klif Fashion Stories FW21, Yumrey Jewelry, Passageway Thailand, Our Second Nature Singapore, Underlinen Fashion House India, Trends Store India, Parx Live Easy India SS24, Iqbal Hussain, Afox Clothing India, Only Vimal India, Borjan Shoes Pakistan, Metro Singapore, Perła Beer, Amari Thailand,... Beside modeling, Obolewicz has appeared on music video "Urodziny" by Dominik Rupiński and pursue an acting career starting in the Malaysian drama "Ms. Janitor Turned CEO".
- Olga Kleczkowska signed with Model Plus Management. She has taken a couple of test shots and appeared on magazine cover and editorials for Kaltblut Germany, Glamour February–March 2020, Fashion PL #1 Spring 2020, Elle May 2020, Gezno France May 2020, Numéro Russia #58 Summer 2020, Highlighted Germany July 2020, Gmaro France #30 March 2023,... She has walked in fashion shows of Dawid Woliński, Pinko, MMC Studio Design SS20, Mariusz Przybylski FW20, Niumi Clothes FW20, Blu Blu PL FW20, Ania Kruk FW20, Molton Styl FW20.21, Lidia Kalita FW20.21, Taranko FW20.21, Angell PL FW20.21, Guess FW20.21, Orska PL FW20, Apart Jewellery FW20, High Everyday Couture FW20, Patrizia Aryton FW20, Liu Jo FW20, Robert Kupisz FW20, Deni Cler Milano FW21.22,... and modeled for Zalando, L'Oreal, Cropp, Apart Jewellery, Mi Levinska Millinery, Fortini PL, Sizeer, Obsessive Lingerie, Sandra Szeliga Design,... Kleczkowska retired from modeling in 2024.
- Dawid Woskanian has collected her prizes and signed with Model Plus Management. He has taken a couple of test shots and appeared on magazine cover and editorials for Glamour December 2019 - January 2020, Viva! February 2020, Elle Man Fall 2020,... He has modeled for Reserved, Apart Jewellery Winter 2019, Top Secret PL, House FW20,... and walked in fashion shows of Marc O'Polo FW20, Nike FW20, Jack Wolfskin FW20, Van Graaf FW20, Maurizio Benttoni FW20, Vistula PL FW20, Robert Kupisz FW20, Mariusz Przybylski FW20, Synthetic 100% Natural FW20.21,... Woskanian retired from modeling in 2023.

== Ratings ==
| Episode | Date | Audience | Share 4+ | Share 16-49 |
|---|---|---|---|---|
| 1 | 2 September | 1 490 660 | 12.80% | 19.12% |
| 2 | 9 September | 1 080 239 | 8.32% | 12.10% |
| 3 | 16 September | 1 281 135 | 10.66% | 16.47% |
| 4 | 23 September | 1 401 328 | 11.17% | 17.55% |
| 5 | 30 September | 1 293 872 | 10.98% | 17.05% |
| 6 | 7 October | 1 610 969 | 13.15% | 21.15% |
| 7 | 14 October | 1 109 515 | 9.44% | 16.76% |
| 8 | 21 October | 1 494 271 | 12.31% | 19.29% |
| 9 | 28 October | 1 296 912 | 11.53% | 17.49% |
| 10 | 4 November | 1 566 940 | 12.74% | 18.98% |
| 11 | 11 November | 1 440 116 | 11.27% | 15.92% |
| 12 | 18 November | 1 463 286 | 11.67% | 17.43% |
| 13 | 25 November | 1 461 477 | 12.11% | 18.12% |
| Average | 2019 | 1 384 462 | 11.39% | 17.46% |
