= Project Runway Poland =

- Genre: Reality competition
- Starring: Anja Rubik (2014-present); Joanna Przetakiewicz (2014-present); Tomasz Ossoliński (2014-present); Marcin Tyszka (2015-present); Mariusz Przybylski (2014)
- Country of origin: Poland
- Original language: Polish
- No. of seasons: 2
- No. of episodes: 26

Production
- Running time: 60 min. (1 & 13 episode); 45 min. (2-12 episode)

Original release
- Network: TVN
- Release: 2 March 2014 – present

Project Runway is a competitive reality television series focusing on fashion design. In Poland it is shown on the TVN. The show follows a group of fashion designers as they compete against each other to avoid being "the next fashion victim" and win the competition. The programme is based upon the US reality show Project Runway.

== Format ==
Project Runway is hosted by a celebrity and judged by a panel with three permanent judges and a 4th guest judge - typically a fashion designer, fashion model or celebrity from the fashion industry. Tomasz Ossoliński, fashion designer, appears as a mentor for the designers giving his criticism of their garments and offering support. The program takes place in Warsaw with designers using a workroom and living together.

The fashion models who work with the designers throughout the season are also in competition. At the beginning of each episode, the designer who won the previous week's challenge is compelled to switch two models (not necessarily including his/her own), and at the end, the model who wore the losing design is automatically eliminated. Included in the prize package for the winning model is coverage in the Polish edition of ELLE magazine.

== Season 1 (2014) ==
=== Designers ===
| Designer | Hometown | Age | Place Finished |
|---|---|---|---|
| Zbigniew Szymański | Brwinów | 28 | 13th |
| Paulina Matuszelańska | Białystok | 24 | 12th |
| Monika Lemańska | Bydgoszcz | 23 | 11th |
| Aleksandra Bąkowska | Warsaw | 24 | 10th |
| Arletta Koczorowska | Kostrzyn Wielkopolski | 48 | 9th |
| Dorota Cieszyńska | Poznań | 42 | 8th |
| Serafin Andrzejak | Warsaw | 26 | 7th |
| Piotr Czajczyński | Fabianów | 22 | 6th |
| Milita Nikonorov | Łódź | 31 | 5th |
| Natalia Ślizowska | Lipki Wielkie | 28 | 4th |
| Liliana Pryma | London | 28 | 3rd |
| Maciej Sieradzky | Łódź | 26 | 2nd |
| Jakub Bartnik | Edinburgh | 29 | 1st |

Special guests

- 1 episode - Ina Lekiewicz
- 2 episode - Dorota Williams
- 3 episode - Dorota Roqueplo
- 4 episode - Weronika Pietras
- 5 episode - Robert Kupisz
- 6 episode - Marcin Paprocki, Mariusz Brzozowski
- 7 episode - Gosia Baczyńska
- 8 episode - Michał Piróg, Anna Jurgaś
- 9 episode - Marcin Prokop, Dorota Wellman
- 10 episode - Marcin Tyszka, Ina Lekiewicz
- 11 episode - Sasha Knezevic
- 12 episode - Katarzyna Sokołowska
- 13 episode - Anthony Vaccarello

Special guest models

- 9 episode - Marcin Prokop, Dorota Wellman
- 10 episode - Ewa Wladymiruk
- 13 episode - Małgorzata Rozenek (for Jakub Bartnik), Agnieszka Szulim (for Maciej Sieradzky), Anna Wendzikowska (for Liliana Pryma)

=== Designer progress ===
Designer Elimination Table
| Designers | 1 | 2 | 3 | 4 | 5 | 6 | 7 | 8 | 9 | 10 | 11 | 12 & 13 | Eliminated Episode |
|---|---|---|---|---|---|---|---|---|---|---|---|---|---|
| Jakub | IN | HIGH | HIGH | HIGH | HIGH | WIN | IMM | WIN | WIN | WIN | WIN | WINNER | 12 & 13 - Finale |
| Maciej | IN | IN | HIGH | WIN | HIGH | LOW | HIGH | IN | HIGH | HIGH | HIGH | RUNNER-UP | 12 & 13 - Finale |
| Liliana | HIGH | WIN | HIGH | IN | IN | HIGH | WIN | HIGH | WIN | LOW | LOW | 3RD PLACE | 12 & 13 - Finale |
| Natalia | WIN | IN | LOW | LOW | IN | IN | LOW | IN | IN | LOW | OUT | | 11 - Dress creation for Anja Rubik and her dog |
| Milita | IN | IN | LOW | IMM | IN | LOW | IN | HIGH | LOW | OUT | | | 10 - Fragility, modernity and transparency |
| Piotr | LOW | LOW | HIGH | HIGH | IN | IN | IN | LOW | OUT | | | | 9 - Clothing for Dorota Wellman and Marcin Prokop |
| Serafin | IN | LOW | HIGH | IN | WIN | IN | HIGH | OUT | | | | | 8 - Be What You May Be |
| Dorota | IN | HIGH | LOW | IN | LOW | IN | OUT | | | | | | 7 - Wedding Dress; 6 - Cocktail Dress |
| Arletta | IN | IN | HIGH | LOW | OUT | | | | | | | | 5 - Street Wear |
| Aleksandra | IN | IN | LOW | OUT | | | | | | | | | 4 - Businesswoman |
| Monika | HIGH | IN | OUT | | | | | | | | | | 3 - Future Fashion |
| Paulina | LOW | OUT | | | | | | | | | | | 2 - Underwear with the costume from Taniec z gwiazdami |
| Zbigniew | OUT | | | | | | | | | | | | 1 - Dress creation with building materials |

The designer came in second but did not win the challenge.
The designer won Project Runway Poland.
The designer won the challenge.
The designer lost and was eliminated from the competition.
The designer had one of the lowest scores for that challenge, but was not eliminated.
The designer was one of the bottom entries in an individual elimination challenge, and was the last person to advance.
The designer won competition and did not have to compete in the next episode.
The designer was on the winning team in the Team Challenge

Model Elimination Table
| Model | 1 | 2 | 3 | 4 | 5 | 6 | 7 | 8 | 9 | 10 | 11 | 12 & 13 |
|---|---|---|---|---|---|---|---|---|---|---|---|---|
| Anna Sakowicz | Zbigniew | Aleksandra | Aleksandra | Piotr | Serafin | Liliana/Dorota | Serafin | Jakub | - | Jakub | Jakub | Jakub |
| Melisa Cieśla | Monika | Serafin | Dorota | Maciej | Maciej | Maciej/Natalia | Maciej | Maciej | - | Maciej | Maciej | Maciej |
| Tamara Subbotko | Liliana | Liliana | Liliana | Liliana | Liliana | Serafin/Milita | Liliana | Liliana | - | Liliana | Liliana | Liliana |
| Weronika Szmajdzińska | Natalia | Natalia | Natalia | Natalia | Natalia | Piotr/Jakub | Natalia | Natalia | - | Natalia | Natalia | OUT |
| Klaudia Ungerman | Milita | Piotr | Jakub | Dorota | Arletta | Dorota/Liliana | Milita | Milita | - | Milita | OUT | |
| Katarzyna Czerwińska | Piotr | Monika | Arletta | Arletta | Piotr | Natalia/Maciej | Dorota | Serafin | - | OUT | | |
| Aleksandra Krysiak | Maciej | Dorota | Piotr | Aleksandra | Milita | Milita/Serafin | Jakub | Piotr | - | OUT | | |
| Magdalena Swat | Dorota | Jakub | Serafin | Serafin | Jakub | Jakub/Piotr | Piotr | OUT | | | | |
| Weronika Bronowicka | Aleksandra | Maciej | Maciej | Jakub | Dorota | OUT | | | | | | |
| Magdalena Krzywda | Jakub | Milita | Monika | Milita | OUT | | | | | | | |
| Katarzyna Tutak | Arletta | Arletta | Milita | OUT | | | | | | | | |
| Emilia Pietras | Paulina | Paulina | OUT | | | | | | | | | |
| Ksenia Chlebicka | Serafin | OUT | | | | | | | | | | |

== Season 2 (2015) ==
=== Designers ===
| Designer | Hometown | Age | Place Finished |
|---|---|---|---|
| Mariusz Rakoczy | Orontowice | 41 | 14th |
| Alicja Korytowska | Fasty | 29 | 13th |
| Magdalena Ba | Kraków | 32 | 12th/11th |
| Monika Olszewska-Sulejewicz | Łódź | 34 | 12th/11th |
| Quoc Anh Tran | Warsaw | 31 | 10th |
| Sara Betkier | Koszalin | 25 | 9th |
| Agata Mickiewicz | Amsterdam | 34 | 8th |
| Dominika Syczyńska | Gliwice | 27 | 7th |
| Bartosz Ludomir Wcisło | Radom | 29 | 6th |
| Piotr Pyrchała | Mikołów | 27 | 5th |
| Sylwia Kuzebska | Warsaw | 37 | 4th |
| Anna Młynarczyk | Modrzyca | 26 | 3rd |
| Patryk Wojciechowski | Gdynia | 22 | 2nd |
| Michał Zieliński | Gdańsk | 19 | 1st |

Special guests

- 1 episode - Jacob Birge (1st season winner)
- 2 episode - Ranita Sobańska
- 3 episode - Maryla Rodowicz
- 4 episode - Sara Boruc
- 5 episode - Maciej Zień
- 6 episode - Małgorzata Rozenek
- 7 episode - Anna Jurgaś, Tomasz Ossoliński
- 8 episode - Anna Dereszowska, Ewa Minge
- 9 episode - Weronika Rosati, Teresa Rosati
- 10 episode - Marcin Paprocki, Mariusz Brzozowski
- 11 episode - Monika Olejnik, Monika Stukonis
- 13 episode - Karolína Kurková

Special guests models

- 2 episode - members of the volleyball team Legionowo
- 3 episode - Maryla Rodowicz
- 9 episode - Family of the members
- 12&13 episode - Michał Szpak (for Patryk Wojciechowski), Mateusz Maga (for Anna Młynarczyk), Marcin 'Madox' Majewski (for Michał Zieliński)

=== Designer progress ===
Designer Elimination Table
| Designers | 1 | 2 | 3 | 4 | 5 | 6 | 7 | 8 | 9 | 10 | 11 | 12 & 13 | Eliminated Episode |
|---|---|---|---|---|---|---|---|---|---|---|---|---|---|
| Michał | HIGH | WIN | WIN | IN | WIN | LOW | HIGH | LOW | LOW | HIGH | WIN | WINNER | 12 & 13 - Finale |
| Patryk | WIN | IMM | WIN | IN | IN | WIN | HIGH | IN | WIN | LOW | LOW | RUNNER-UP | 12 & 13 - Finale |
| Anna | LOW | IN | IN | WIN | LOW | HIGH | LOW | LOW | IN | LOW | HIGH | 3RD PLACE | 12 & 13 - Finale |
| Sylwia | HIGH | IN | LOW | HIGH | HIGH | IN | IN | WIN | HIGH | WIN | OUT | | 11 - Costume jewelry session |
| Piotr | IN | HIGH | HIGH | IN | IN | IN | WIN | LOW | LOW | OUT | | | 10 - Dress expressing car |
| Bartosz | LOW | LOW | HIGH | LOW | IN | IN | IN | IN | OUT | | | | 9 - Outfit for a family member |
| Dominika | IN | IN | IN | IN | LOW | OUT | IN | OUT | | | | | 6 - Hotel uniforms 8 - Businesswoman |
| Agata | IN | HIGH | IN | IN | HIGH | IN | OUT | | | | | | 7 - Haute couture |
| Sar | IN | IN | IN | HIGH | OUT | | | | | | | | 5 - Dresses for the red carpet |
| Quoc Anh | IN | LOW | LOW | OUT | | | | | | | | | 4 - Underwear |
| Monika | IN | IN | OUT | | | | | | | | | | 3 - Dress for Maryla Rodowicz |
| Magdalena | LOW | LOW | OUT | | | | | | | | | | 3 - Dress for Maryla Rodowicz |
| Alicja | IN | OUT | | | | | | | | | | | 2 - Athletic wear for women's volleyball team |
| Mariusz | OUT | | | | | | | | | | | | 1 - An outfit that expresses me |

The designer came in second but did not win the challenge.
The designer won Project Runway Poland.
The designer won the challenge.
The designer lost and was eliminated from the competition.
(LOW) The designer was one of the bottom entries in an individual elimination challenge, but was not the last person to advance.
(LOW) The designer was one of the bottom entries in an individual elimination challenge, and was the last person to advance.
The designer won competition and did not have to compete in the next episode.
The designer was on the winning team in the Team Challenge

Model elimination table
| Model | 1 | 2 | 3 | 4 | 5 | 6 | 7 | 8 | 9 | 10 | 11 | 12 & 13 |
|---|---|---|---|---|---|---|---|---|---|---|---|---|
| Marta Sędzicka | Michał | Michał | - | Michał | Anna | Michał | Michał | Bartosz | - | Michał | Michał | Michał |
| Katarzyna Deszczuk | Agata | Agata | - | Patryk | Bartosz | Anna | Anna | Patryk | - | Patryk | Patryk | Patryk |
| Diana Gagała | Anna | Anna | - | Sara | Sara | Dominika | Dominika | Dominika | - | Anna | Anna | Anna |
| Katarzyna Oleszczuk | Sylwia | Sylwia | - | Sylwia | Sylwia | Patryk | Patryk | Sylwia | - | Sylwia | Sylwia | OUT |
| Zuzanna Kołodziejczak | Piotr | Piotr | - | Piotr | Dominika | Piotr | Piotr | Piotr | - | Piotr | OUT | |
| Katarzyna Porycka | Sara | Sara | - | Agata | Agata | Sylwia | Sylwia | Michał | - | OUT | | |
| Weronika Szmajdzińska | Alicja | Alicja | - | Anna | Michał | Bartosz | Bartosz | Anna | - | OUT | | |
| Joanna Abramowicz | Monika | Monika | - | Bartosz | Patryk | Agata | Agata | OUT | | | | |
| Aleksandra Stęplewska | Dominika | Dominika | - | Dominika | Potr | OUT | | | | | | |
| Anna Tsiupa | Quoc Anh | Quoc Anh | - | Quoc Anh | OUT | | | | | | | |
| Ewelina Białas | Magdalena | Magdalena | - | OUT | | | | | | | | |
| Zuzanna Bojarska | Patryk | Patryk | - | OUT | | | | | | | | |
| Martyna Gorzelana | Bartosz | Bartosz | - | OUT | | | | | | | | |
| Michalina Strabel | Mariusz | OUT | | | | | | | | | | |

== Ratings - Season 1 (2014) ==
| Episode | Date | Official rating | Share | Share 16-49 |
|---|---|---|---|---|
| 1 | 2 March | 1 605 816 | 10,31% | 14,69% |
| 2 | 9 March | 1 750 666 | 10,94% | 15,52% |
| 3 | 16 March | | | |
| 4 | 23 March | | | |
| 5 | 30 March | 1 640 762 | 9,99% | 14,92% |
| 6 | 6 April | | | |
| 7 | 13 April | | | |
| 8 | 20 April | | | |
| 9 | 27 April | | | |
| 10 | 4 May | | | |
| 11 | 11 May | 1 601 543 | 10,02% | 14,64% |
| 12 | 18 May | | | |
| 13 | 25 May | 2 068 960 | 13,36% | 18,62% |
| Average | 2014 | 1 604 916 | 10,00% | 13,92% |

== Ratings - Season 2 (2015) ==
| Episode | Date | Official rating | Share | Share 16-49 |
|---|---|---|---|---|
| 1 | 4 March | 1 367 430 | 9,91% | |
| 2 | 11 March | 1 226 866 | 8,88% | |
| 3 | 18 March | 1 389 313 | 10,18% | |
| 4 | 25 March | | | |
