= Palmer Harding =

International fashion brand

Levi Palmer was born in Belton, Texas, USA in 1981 into a working-class family. He discovered goth subculture at a young age and decided to pursue a career in fashion. After moving to Austin, Texas and showing his first catwalk at a local nightclub, he started the Designer Guild of Austin along with other local fashion designers in 2000. In 2001, he began studies in Pattern Cutting and Fashion Design at El Centro College in Dallas. In 2003, he entered his graduate collection into the Fashion Group International's student Career Day competition and won the top two prizes, which included a summer of study in London and Paris. After returning to Dallas and starting a jewelry business, he continued his education at Central Saint Martins in London from 2005-2009.

John "Matthew" Harding was born in England in 1984 and grew up in Rickmansworth. He studied fashion at Central Saint Martins continuing onto the womenswear BA course (where he met Palmer in 2007) and eventually the MA course under the tutelage of Louise Wilson graduating in 2010 alongside peers such as Simone Rocha and Thomas Tait. He opened the school's annual fashion show at London Fashion Week in 2010 with his graduate collection and was offered a collaboration with Topshop shortly after. He also entered his graduate collection into the Knak weekend competition in Belgium and shared the grand prize of €5000 with Lea Peckre.

Palmer and Harding met in 2007 while studying at Central Saint Martins, began a relationship, and entered into a civil partnership in 2008. They currently live and work in Hoxton, London. Palmer briefly worked for H&M.

== Business ==
In 2011, French award establishment ANDAM approached Harding to be featured as a competition finalist alongside designer Anthony Vaccarello. Inspired by this experience, Palmer and Harding decided to join their creative talent to start the brand Palmer Harding around the central idea of reinterpreting a woman's shirt. The duo used the savings from Harding's prize winnings to move back into his parents house in Rickmansworth, initially establishing the Palmer Harding brand out of his childhood bedroom. Though the duo did not win ANDAM, their business idea caught the attention of Sarah Mower, resulting in the British Fashion Council offering Palmer Harding their support initiative NewGen in September 2011.

Palmer Harding's first collection for Spring/Summer 2012 was shown as part of an exhibition at London Fashion Week. After two years of NewGen Support the duo showed their first catwalk collection at London Fashion Week in September 2013.

In 2016, Palmer Harding collaborated with John Lewis to create a capsule collection that became notable when former Prime Minister Theresa May wore their shirt to several press appearances.

In 2017, Michelle Obama wore Palmer Harding's "The Super Shirt". Later that same year Palmer Harding won The British Fashion Council/Vogue Designer Fashion Fund.

In the early days, the brand was stocked by boutiques such as Forty Five Ten in Dallas and Joyce Hong Kong. More recently the brand is stocked by international retailers such as Harrods and Liberty in London, Neiman Marcus in the USA, matchesfashion.com and Net-A-Porter.
