= Ewa Minge =

Polish fashion designer (born 1967)

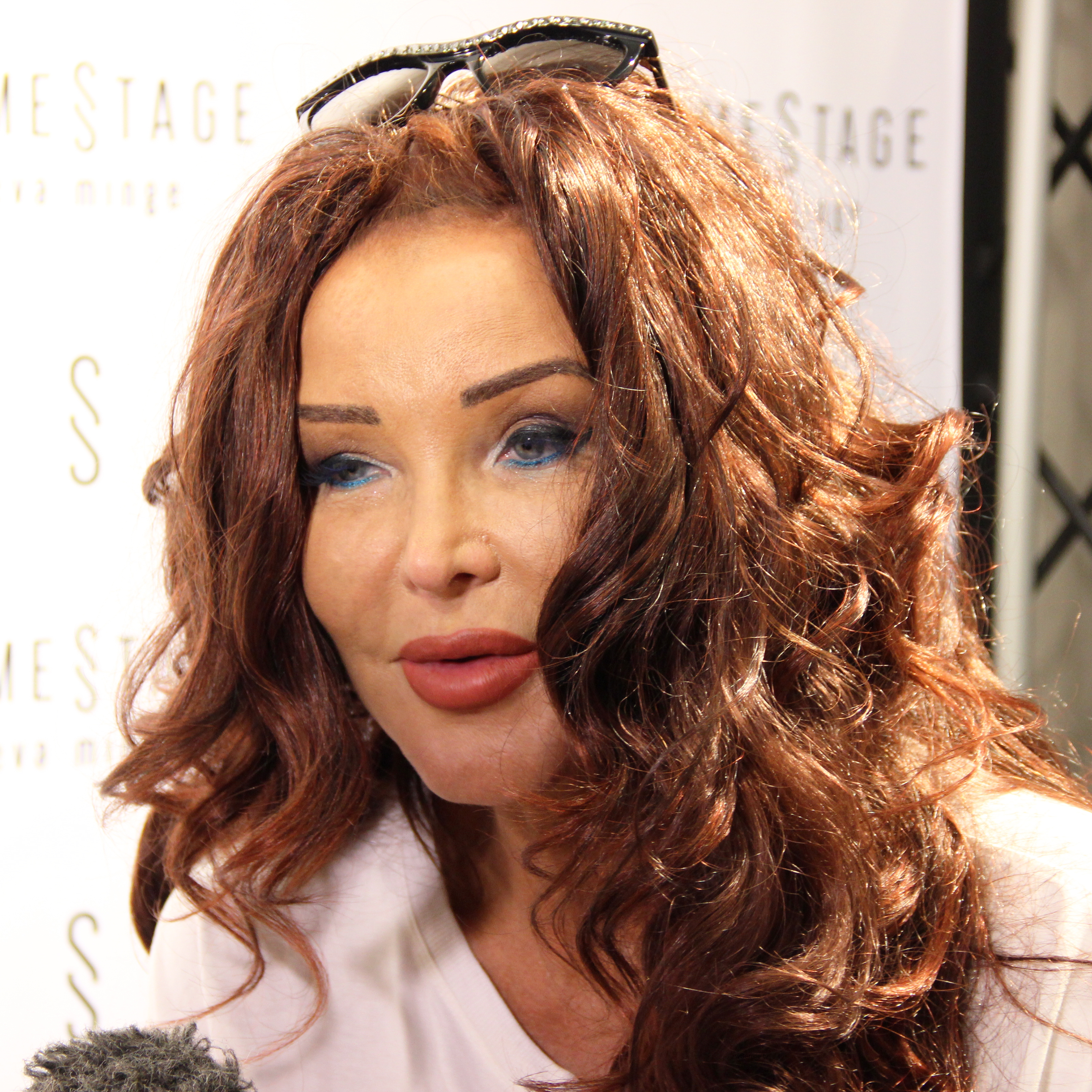
- Ewa Minge in 2015
- Born: 23 May 1967; Szczecinek, Poland
- Occupation: fashion designer

Ewa Minge (born 23 May 1967 in Szczecinek, Poland) is a Polish fashion designer. Dubbed the "Next Couture", her collection has been shown globally, including on the Spanish Steps in Rome. Minge is one of Poland's most well-known fashion designers. Since 1994, her main focus has been on fashion and upmarket industrial design.

In Poland, Ewa Minge cooperates with TVP and TVN television channels, creating images of celebrities and contributing to TV productions.
