= Paul & Shark =

Italian-based clothing brand

Dama S.p.A.
- Trade name: Paul & Shark
- Industry: Clothing
- Founded: 1975; 51 years ago in Italy
- Founder: Paolo Dini
- Headquarters: Varese, Italy
- Key people: Andrea Dini, CEO
- Website: paulandshark.com

Paul & Shark is an Italian clothing brand founded in 1975 by Paolo Dini, son of mill owner Gian Ludovico Dini. It has 280 stores worldwide and is headquartered in Varese. Its CEO is Andrea Dini.

The brand was inspired by the sail of an 18th-century clipper, inscribed with the words "Paul & Shark" seen during Dini's visit to a small sailmaker's workshop in Maine. In 2017, GQ called it "the sailing man's sailing gear".

== See also ==
- Made in Italy
- Loro Piana
- Brunello Cucinelli
- Etro
- Brioni
