= CKM (magazine) =

Men's magazine

- June 2009 cover (Hungarian edition) featuring Anette Dawn
- Editor-in-chief: Piotr Skalski
- Categories: Sex, lifestyle, entertainment
- Frequency: Monthly
- Publisher: Marquard Media Polska
- Founded: 1998
- First issue: July 1998; 28 years ago
- Final issue: December 2019; 6 years ago
- Country: Poland
- Based in: Warsaw
- Language: Polish, Hungarian, Serbian
- Website: ckm.pl
- ISSN: 1505-6562

CKM was a men's magazine published in Poland, Hungary, and Serbia. Its title is an acronym for the Polish: Czasopismo każdego mężczyzny, lit. 'Every Man's Magazine', the Hungarian: Céltudatos Kalandvágyó [Férfiak] Magazinja and the Serbian: Cice, Kola, Medvedi.

== History and profile ==
CKM was established by Marquard Media in 1998. It comprised a group of cultural semi-erotic monthly magazines for men, focused mainly on entertainment and factography. It included editions in Poland and Hungary. The latter was launched in 1998. Both Polish and Hungarian editions were part of the Marquard Media. There was also a CKM – Serbian edition launched in September 2003.

Piotr Gontowski was the editor-in-chief of the Polish edition.

The written tone was outspoken, provocative, at the same time finding humour and dealing with serious issues. The magazine also contained articles on lifestyle topics.

In 2019, CKM was discontinued in print by its publisher, Marquard Media Polska, alongside Polish versions of Playboy, Esquire, Cosmopolitan, Joy and Harper’s Bazaar. The final issue of CKM appeared in December 2019.

=== International editions ===
(starting at the accompanying date, or during the accompanying date range)

- Polish (1998–2019), original edition
- Hungarian (1998–2013)
- Serbian (2003–2014)
