= Joy (magazine) =

Monthly women's magazine in Germany

JOY
- Joy August 2011 cover
- Categories: Women's magazine
- Frequency: Monthly
- Publisher: Marquard
- Founded: 1995; 31 years ago
- Final issue: January–February 2023
- Company: Marquard (1995-2012); Bauer Media Group (2012-2020); Ocean Global (2020-2023)
- Country: Germany
- Website: www.joy.de
- ISSN: 1422-9188

Joy was an international women's magazine, started in 1995 with a German-language edition. Topics included lifestyle, trends, fashion, beauty, and men. The covers usually featured famous actresses, singers and other female entertainers.

In Germany Joy was part of Bauer Media and was published by Marquard on a monthly basis. The magazine folded in December 2022 after 27 years of publication.

== Editions ==
Joy had nine international editions:

- Germany (since 1995)
- Hungary (since 1998)
- Serbia (since 2003)
- Romania (since 2004)
- Czech Republic (since 2005)
- Russia (since 2006)
- Bulgaria (since 2006)
- Ukraine (since 2007)
- Indonesia (since 2011)
