= Maciej Zień =

Polish fashion designer (born 1979)

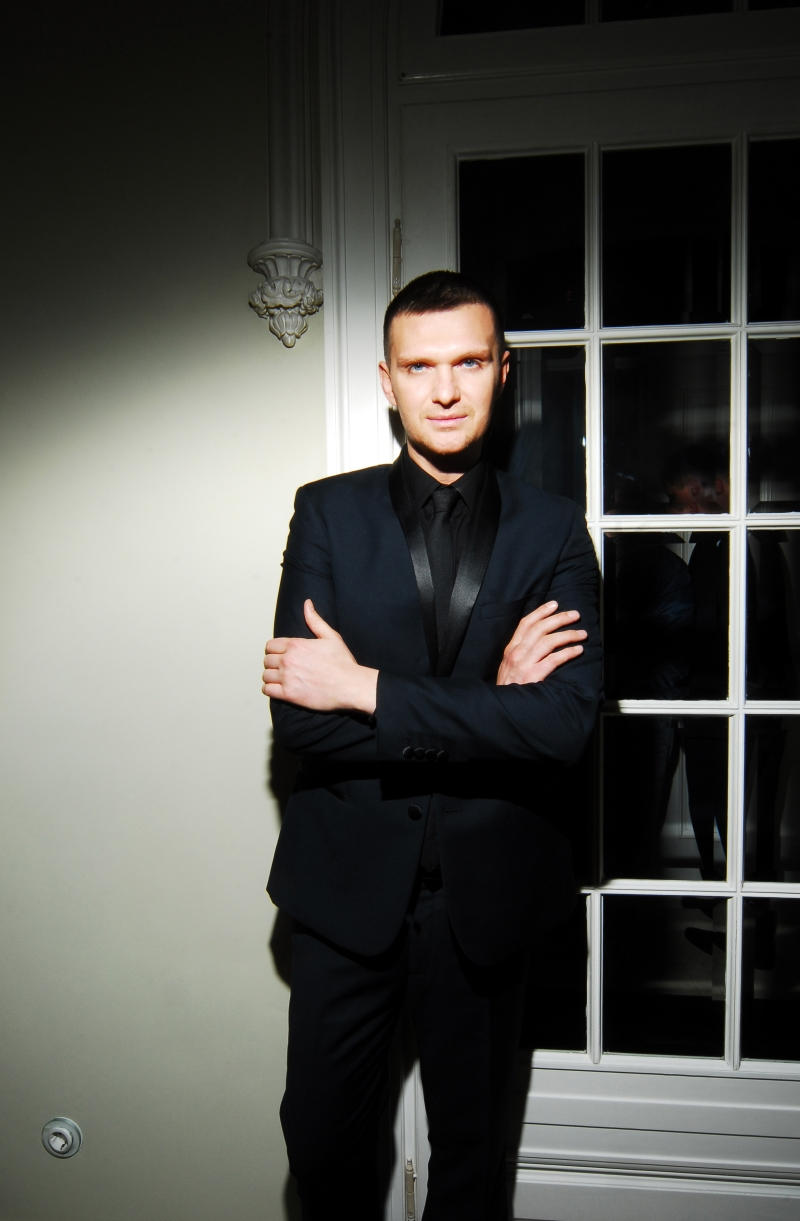
- Maciej Zień
- Born: 24 April 1979 (age 47); Lublin, Poland
- Occupation: fashion designer

Maciej Zień (Maciej Zień; born 24 April 1979 in Lublin, Poland) is a Polish fashion designer.

His career started when as a teenager, when he presented his collection Provocations in Lublin. He admits that he had a lot of luck. “But what counts most is stubbornness...putting your heart into what you’re doing.”

Zień has made a brilliant career—his clothes were worn by former First Lady of Poland Jolanta Kwaśniewska, soprano Ewa Małas-Godlewska, Polish pop singer Kayah and businesswoman Anna Starak.

“Fashion has always been my great passion, [...] I decided what I wanted to do in life when I opened my atelier. It was created with single, expensive creations in mind, but it started to develop after a while.”

Zień is also preparing a less expensive pret-a-porter collection and gradually creating a network of boutiques. Garments with a Mat Alex or Maciej Zień label can be bought in London and Geneva, and will soon appear in Monte Carlo. Zień is the only Polish designer whose work has been shown at the National Museum.

“My biggest success was working with Patricia Kaas. I went to her concert in Riga; we started to talk and this is how it all started.”

Zień has also designed a VIP room for the club Utopia, and costumes for a play. His passion is designing interiors and accessories.
