= Top Model (Polish TV series) season 10 =

Top Model
- Season 10
- No. of episodes: 13

Release
- Original network: TVN
- Original release: September 1 – November 24, 2021

Season chronology
- ← Previous; Season 9 Next → Season 11

Top Model, cycle 10 is the tenth cycle of an ongoing reality television series based on Tyra Banks' America's Next Top Model that pits contestants from Poland against each other in a variety of competitions to determine who will win the title of the next Polish Top Model.

Joanna Krupa, who also serves as the lead judge, returned to host the tenth cycle. Other judges included fashion designer Dawid Woliński, fashion show director Kasia Sokołowska and photographer Marcin Tyszka. This is the seventh season of the show to feature male contestants.

Among the prizes for the season were a contract with Models Plus Management, an appearance on the cover of the Polish issue of Glamour, and 100,000 złotys (US$30,000).

The international destinations for this cycle are Prague and Malé. The winner of the competition was 20 year-old Dominika Wysocka, from Koszalin.

== Cast ==
=== Contestants ===
(Ages stated are at start of contest)

Contestant	Age	Height	Hometown	Finish	Place
Kacper Orenkiewicz	20	1.86 m (6 ft 1 in)	Oslo, Norway	Episode 4	15
Bartosz 'Bartek' Kloch	23	1.82 m (5 ft 11 1/2 in)	Wiązowna	Episode 5	14
Wiktoria Pawliszewska	25	1.77 m (5 ft 9 1/2 in)	Warsaw	Episode 6	13
Olga Król	19	1.78 m (5 ft 10 in)	Drobin	Episode 7	12
Łukasz Wasielewski	21	1.84 m (6 ft 1/2 in)	Kuźnica	Episode 8	11
Sophia Mokhar	24	1.76 m (5 ft 9 1/2 in)	Minsk, Belarus	Episode 9	10 (quit)
Adam Lochyński	20	1.86 m (6 ft 1 in)	Wągrowiec	Episode 9	9
Aleksandra 'Ola' Skubis	23	1.75 m (5 ft 9 in)	Warsaw	Episode 10	8-7
Arkadiusz 'Arek' Pydych	26	1.89 m (6 ft 2 1/2 in)	Rome, Italy	Episode 10	8-7
Weronika Zoń	21	1.75 m (5 ft 9 in)	Southampton, United Kingdom	Episode 11	6
Mikołaj Krawiecki	22	1.92 m (6 ft 3 1/2 in)	Warsaw	Episode 12	5-4
Kacper Jasiński	20	1.88 m (6 ft 2 in)	Łódź	Episode 12	5-4
Julia Sobczyńska	22	1.77 m (5 ft 9 1/2 in)	Łask	Episode 13	3
Nicole Akonchong	19	1.77 m (5 ft 9 1/2 in)	Macerata, Italy	Episode 13	2
Dominika Wysocka	20	1.76 m (5 ft 9 1/2 in)	Koszalin	Episode 13	1

=== Judges ===
- Joanna Krupa – Host and head judge
- Dawid Woliński – Designer
- Katarzyna Sokołowska – Fashion director
- Marcin Tyszka – Photographer

=== Other cast members ===
- Michał Piróg – Mentor

== Episodes ==
=== Episode 1 ===
Original airdate: 1 September 2021

Auditions for the tenth season of Top Model begin, and aspiring hopefuls are chosen for the semi-final round.

- Silver ticket winner: Anna Szczepańska

=== Episode 2 ===
Original airdate: 8 September 2021

In the semi-finals, the judges begin to eliminate contestants to narrow the number of models who will battle it out for a place in the top model house.

- Golden ticket winner: Weronika Zoń

=== Episode 3 ===
Original airdate: 15 September 2021

In the third and final casting episode of the season, the judges chose the finalists who will move onto the main competition out of the remaining pool of contestants.

Group	Models
One	Arek, Ania, Dominika, Adam S., Blanka, Natalia ,Szymon
Two	Kacper O., Łukasz, Marianna, Sophia, Wiktoria P.,Julia Z.,Ania
Three	Olga, Kacper J., Sofia, Bartek, Julia S., Łukasz, Ola
Four	Nicole, Paweł, Wiktoria N, Adam L., Natalie, Monika, Mikołaj

=== Episode 4 ===
Original airdate: 22 September 2021

- Challenge winners: Julia Sobczyńska, Kacper Orenkiewicz, Nicole Akonchong & Mikołaj Krawiecki
- First call-out: Weronika Zoń
- Bottom three: Arek Pydych, Kacper Orenkiewicz, & Ola Skubis
- Eliminated: Kacper Orenkiewicz
- Featured photographer: Marcin Tyszka
- Guest judge: Robert Kupisz

=== Episode 5 ===
Original airdate: 29 September 2021

- First challenge winners: Julia Sobczyńska
- Second challenge winners: Mikołaj Krawiecki, Julia Sobczyńska, Kacper Jasiński, Olga Król, Ola Skubis
- First call-out: Adam Lochyński & Nicole Akonchong
- Bottom three: Bartek Kloch, Dominika Wysocka & Wiktoria Pawliszewska
- Eliminated: Bartek Kloch
- Featured photographer: Natasza Parzymies
- Guest judge: Marta Dyks, Natasza Parzymies

=== Episode 6 ===
Original airdate: 6 October 2021

- Challenge winners: Arek Pydych & Weronika Zoń
- First call-out: Dominika Wysocka
- Bottom three: Mikołaj Krawiecki, Olga Król & Wiktoria Pawliszewska
- Eliminated: Wiktoria Pawliszewska
- Featured photographer: Marcin Tyszka & Marta Wojtal
- Guest judge: Joanna Koroniewska

=== Episode 7 ===
Original airdate: 13 October 2021

- Challenge winners: Julia Sobczyńska, Kacper Jasiński & Sophia Mokhar
- First call-out: Mikołaj Krawiecki
- Bottom three: Olga Król, Sophia Mokhar & Weronika Zoń
- Eliminated: Olga Król
- Featured director: Ralph Kaminski
- Guest judge: Ralph Kaminski, Dominik Sadoch

=== Episode 8 ===
Original airdate: 20 October 2021

- First call-out: Julia Sobczyńska
- Bottom three: Łukasz Wasielewski, Ola Skubis & Sophia Mokhar
- Eliminated: Łukasz Wasielewski & Ola Skubis
- Featured photographer: Magdalena Luniewska
- Guest judge: Julia Banaś

=== Episode 9 ===
Original airdate: 27 October 2021

- Quit: Sophia Mokhar
- Returned: Ola Skubis
- First challenge winners: Julia Sobczyńska, Kacper Jasiński & Weronika Zoń
- Second challenge winners: Kacper Jasiński
- First call-out: Mikołaj Krawiecki
- Bottom three: Adam Lochyński, Kacper Jasiński & Weronika Zoń
- Eliminated: Adam Lochyński
- Guest judge: Kasia Dąbrowska
- Featured photographer: Zosia Promińska & Marcin Tyszka
- Special guests: Anna Piszczałka (Cycle 1), Olga Kaczyńska (Cycle 2), Zuzanna Kołodziejczyk (Cycle 3), Mateusz Maga (Cycle 4), Karolina Pisarek (Cycle 5), Patryk Grudowicz (Cycle 6), Kasia Szklarczyk (Cycle 7), Dawid Woskanian (Cycle 8) & Mikołaj Śmieszek (Cycle 9)

=== Episode 10 ===
Original airdate: 3 November 2021

- First challenge winner: Nicole Akonchong
- Second challenge winner: Nicole Akonchong & Dominika Wysocka
- First call-out: Julia Sobczyńska
- Bottom three: Arek Pydych, Dominika Wysocka & Ola Skubis
- Eliminated: Arek Pydych & Ola Skubis
- Featured photographer: Mateusz Nasternak, Agnieszka Kulesza & Łukasz Pik
- Guest judge: Ashlee Barrett-Bourmier

=== Episode 11 ===
Original airdate: 10 November 2021

- Challenge winner: Weronika Zoń & Mikołaj Krawiecki
- First call-out: Nicole Akonchong
- Bottom three: Julia Sobczyńska, Kacper Jasiński & Weronika Zoń
- Eliminated: Kacper Jasiński & Weronika Zoń
- Saved: Kacper Jasiński
- Featured photographer: Standa Merhout
- Guest judge: Daniela Pestova
- Special Guests: Jan Smejkal, Alexandra, Gnidiakova, Vanda Janda, Boris Kral, Tomas Nemec, Michael Kovacik, Daniela Pilna, Zdenka Rezkova, Petra Kubikova, Pavol Dendis, Antonin Soukup

=== Episode 12 ===
Original airdate: 17 November 2021

- First call-out: Nicole Akonchong
- Bottom three: Dominika Wysocka, Kacper Jasiński & Mikołaj Krawiecki
- Eliminated: Kacper Jasiński & Mikołaj Krawiecki
- Featured photographer: Marcin Tyszka
- Guest judge: Vanda Janda
- Special Guests: Adela Lastovkova Stodolova, Boris Kral, Barbora Michnova, Zdenka Rezkova, Daniela Pilna, Michael Kovacik, Hana Kohoutova, Jana Kapounová, Michaela Kocianová

=== Episode 13 ===
Original airdate: 24 November 2021

Scores (Note: In episode 13, Julia was eliminated prior to the reveal of the votes, she received 2 points from the judges for her Glamour photo. The final two's votes were revealed in the official instagram account of the show where Dominika received 2 points while Nicole received 1 point.)
Nº	Model	Jury	Viewers	Total
1	Dominika	3 (27)	2 (52%)	5
2	Nicole	3 (27)	1 (48%)	4
3	Julia	2 (12)	N/A	2

- Final three: Dominika Wysocka, Julia Sobczyńska & Nicole Akonchong
- Eliminated: Julia Sobczyńska
- Final two: Dominika Wysocka & Nicole Akonchong
- Poland's Next Top Model: Dominika Wysocka
- Featured photographer: Marcin Klaban & Dorota Szulc
- Guest judge: Monika "Jac" Jagaciak
- Special Guests: Michał "Fox" Krol, Brodka, Smolasty, Anna Piszczałka (Cycle 1), Joanna Kudzbalska (Cycle 2), Zuzanna Kołodziejczyk (Cycle 3), Osuenhe Ugonoh (Cycle 4), Karolina Pisarek (Cycle 5), Patryk Grudowicz (Cycle 6), Kasia Szklarczyk (Cycle 7), Olga Kleczkowska (Cycle 8) & Patrycja Sobolewska (Cycle 9)

== Results ==
Order	Episodes											
Order	3 (Note: Episodes 2 and 3 were casting episodes. In episode 3, the pool of semi-finalists was reduced to the final 14 models who moved on to the main competition.)	4 (Note: Weronika had been granted a 'Golden Ticket' during the show's auditions, and was therefore automatically granted a spot in the final cast.)	5 (Note: In episode 5, Adam and Nicole shared the first call out.)	6	7	8	9 (Note: In episode 9, Sophia decided to quit the competition. Therefore Ola was allowed to return.)	10	11 (Note: In episode 11, Kacper J. was originally eliminated along with Weronika, but mentor Michał Piróg, who'd been granted the opportunity of bringing one eliminated contestant back into the competition, decided to save him.)	12	13	
1	Julia	Weronika	Adam; Nicole	Dominika	Mikołaj	Julia	Mikołaj	Julia	Nicole	Nicole	Nicole	Dominika
2	Ola	Kacper J.	Adam; Nicole	Arek	Łukasz	Weronika	Julia	Weronika	Dominika	Julia	Dominika	Nicole
3	Kacper J.	Dominika	Weronika	Nicole	Dominika	Arek	Nicole	Nicole	Mikołaj	Dominika	Julia	
4	Olga	Wiktoria	Łukasz	Łukasz	Kacper J.	Mikołaj	Dominika	Mikołaj	Julia	Kacper J. Mikołaj		
5	Bartek	Mikołaj	Mikołaj	Adam	Adam	Nicole	Arek	Kacper J.	Kacper J.	Kacper J. Mikołaj		
6	Nicole	Julia	Arek	Weronika	Ola	Kacper J.	Ola	Dominika	Weronika			
7	Mikołaj	Adam	Ola	Kacper J.	Arek	Dominika	Kacper J.	Arek; Ola				
8	Adam	Olga	Julia	Julia	Nicole	Adam	Weronika	Arek; Ola				
9	Kacper O.	Bartek	Sophia	Sophia	Julia	Sophia	Adam					
10	Wiktoria	Sophia	Olga	Ola	Weronika	Łukasz; Ola	Sophia					
11	Sophia	Łukasz	Kacper J.	Mikołaj	Sophia	Łukasz; Ola						
12	Dominika	Nicole	Wiktoria	Olga	Olga							
13	Łukasz	Ola	Dominika	Wiktoria								
14	Arek	Arek	Bartek									
15		Kacper O.										

The contestant was eliminated.
The contestant was immune from elimination.
The contestant quit the competition
The contestant was originally eliminated but was saved
The contestant won the competition.

=== Photo shoots ===
- Episode 3 photo shoot: Group shots (semifinals)
- Episode 4 photo shoot: Posing on a rotating wheel
- Episode 5 video shoot : Romance in a library
- Episode 6 photo shoot: Nude shoot with fabric
- Episode 7 video shoot: Fashion film by Ralph Kaminski
- Episode 8 photo shoot: Slavic Myths
- Episode 9 photo shoot: Fashion athletes
- Episode 10 photo shoot: Vogue Polska editorial
- Episode 11 photo shoot: Posing on a helicopter
- Episode 12 photo shoots: Marble theater; Streets of Prague
- Episode 13 photo shoots: Glamour covers, Apart Jewelry campaign
