= Top Model (Polish TV series) season 11 =

Top Model
- Season 11
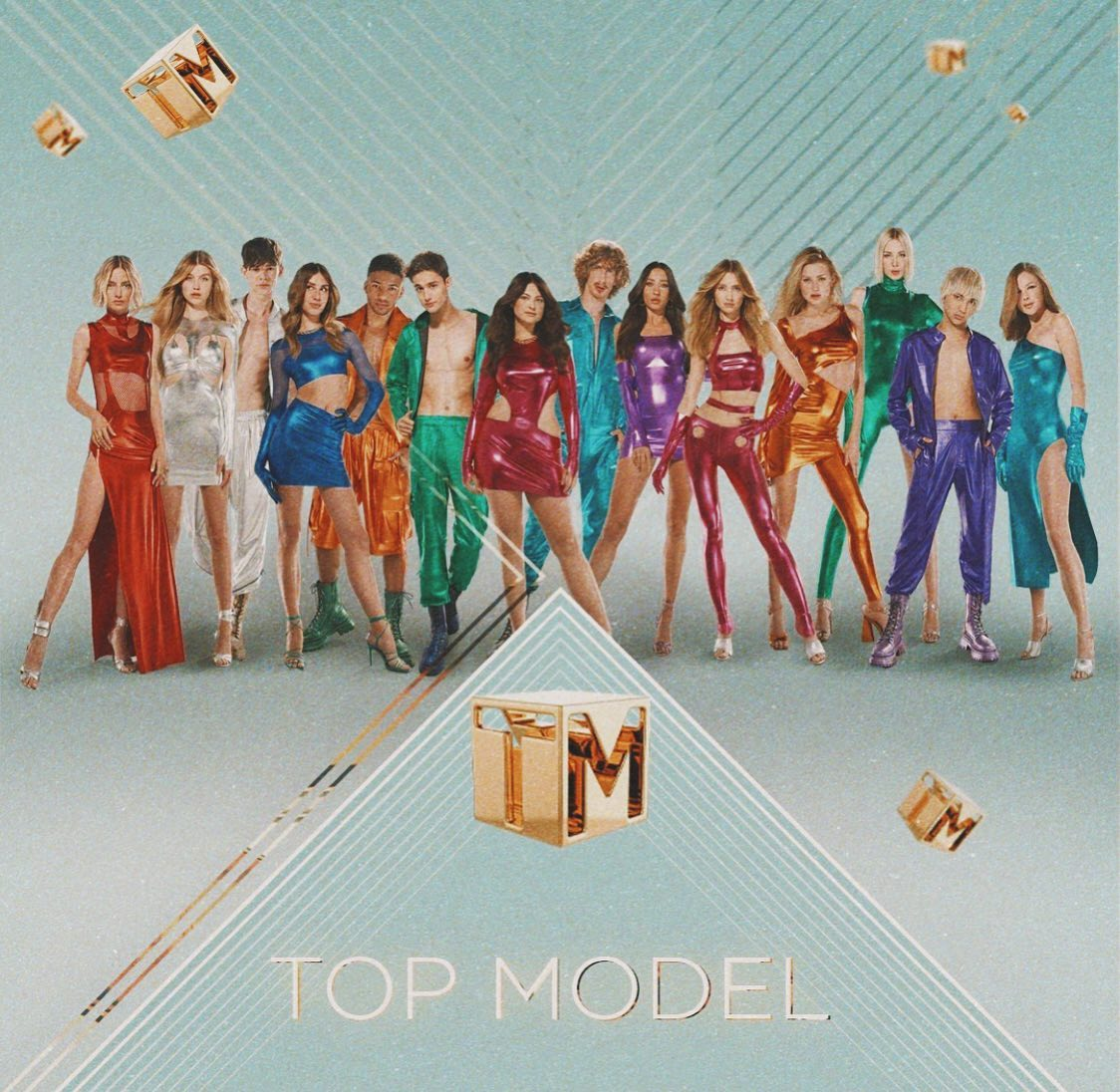
- It's time to shine!
- No. of episodes: 14 (+1 special)

Release
- Original network: TVN
- Original release: September 7 – December 14, 2022

Season chronology
- ← Previous; Season 10 Next → Season 12

Top Model, cycle 11 is the eleventh cycle of an ongoing reality television series based on Tyra Banks' America's Next Top Model that pits contestants from Poland against each other in a variety of competitions to determine who will win the title of the next Polish Top Model.

Joanna Krupa, who also serves as the lead judge, returned to host the eleventh cycle. Other judges included fashion designer Dawid Woliński, fashion show director Kasia Sokołowska and photographer Marcin Tyszka. This is the eighth season of the show to feature male contestants.

Among the prizes for the season are a contract with D'Vision Models Management, an appearance on the cover of the Polish issue of Glamour, and 100,000 złotys (US$30,000).

This cycle introduced a brand new boot-camp which took place in Warsaw. The semi-finalists took part in three evaluations: fittings for the fashion show, test session, and self-presentation. After that, the final cast was selected.

The international destinations of this cycle were Cape Town, Johannesburg and Punta Cana. The winner of the competition was 22-year-old Klaudia Nieścior from Tarnobrzeg.

== Cast ==
=== Contestants ===
(Ages stated are at start of contest)

Contestant	Age	Height	Hometown	Finish	Place
Karolina Kuracińska	18	1.71 m (5 ft 7 1/2 in)	Świebodzice	Episode 4	14
Marcelina Zetler	20	1.80 m (5 ft 11 in)	Barcin	Episode 5	13
Krystian Embradora	18	1.81 m (5 ft 11 1/2 in)	Grodzisk Mazowiecki	Episode 7	12
Filip Ferner	20	1.98 m (6 ft 6 in)	Warsaw	Episode 8	11
Martyna Kaczmarek	27	1.80 m (5 ft 11 in)	Szczecin	Episode 9	10
Weronika Pawelec	19	1.74 m (5 ft 8 1/2 in)	Orzelec Duży	Episode 10	9-8
Adrian Nkwamu	20	1.88 m (6 ft 2 in)	Jawor	Episode 10	9-8
Aleksandra 'Ola' Helis	19	1.77 m (5 ft 9 1/2 in)	Zielonka	Episode 11	7
Maciej Skiba	21	1.96 m (6 ft 5 in)	Koszalin	Episode 13	6-4
Borys Barchan	19	1.89 m (6 ft 2 1/2 in)	Lubin	Episode 13	6-4
Adriana Hyzopska	18	1.81 m (5 ft 11 1/2 in)	Klonowiec Wielki	Episode 13	6-4
Michalina Wojciechowska	23	1.72 m (5 ft 7 1/2 in)	Olsztyn	Episode 14	3
Natalia Woś	17	1.75 m (5 ft 9 in)	Żagań	Episode 14	2
Klaudia Nieścior	22	1.80 m (5 ft 11 in)	Tarnobrzeg	Episode 14	1

=== Judges ===
- Joanna Krupa – Host and head judge
- Dawid Woliński – Designer
- Katarzyna Sokołowska – Fashion director
- Marcin Tyszka – Photographer

=== Other cast members ===
- Michał Piróg – Mentor

== Episodes ==
=== Episode 1 ===
Original airdate: 7 September 2022

Auditions for the eleventh season of Top Model begin, and aspiring hopefuls are chosen for the semi-final round.

=== Episode 2 ===
Original airdate: 14 September 2022

In the semi-finals, the judges begin to eliminate contestants to narrow the number of models who will battle it out for a place in the top model house.

- Golden ticket winner: Ola Helis

=== Episode 3 ===
Original airdate: 21 September 2022

In the season's third and final casting episode, the judges chose the finalists who will move on to the main competition out of the remaining pool of contestants.

- Silver ticket winner: Fabian Sokołowski
- Featured photographer: Marcin Tyszka
- Guest judge: Peyman Amin

=== Episode 4 ===
Original airdate: 28 September 2022

- Challenge winner: Martyna Kaczmarek & Natalia Woś
- First call-out: Weronika Pawelec
- Bottom three: Karolina Kuracińska, Krystian Embradora & Marcelina Zetler
- Eliminated: Karolina Kuracińska
- Featured photographer: Marcin Tyszka
- Guest judge: Monika Jac Jagaciak
- Special guests: Marek Sierzputowski, Kasia Dąbrowska, Jan Kryszczak

=== Episode 5 ===
Original airdate: 6 October 2022

- First challenge winners: Maciej Skiba & Michalina Wojciechowska
- Second challenge winners: Adrian Nkwamu, Adriana Hyzopska, Martyna Kaczmarek & Weronika Pawelec
- First call-out: Klaudia Nieścior
- Bottom three: Maciej Skiba, Marcelina Zetler & Ola Helis
- Eliminated: Marcelina Zetler
- Featured photographer: Aleksandra Modrzejewska (shoot)
- Guest judge: Marianna Gierszewska
- Special guests: Dominika Wysocka, Kamil Kotarba, Kasia Dąbrowska, Aleksander Ryzow, Klaudia El Dursi, Kasia Zillmann, Magdalena Piotrowska

=== Episode 6 ===
Original airdate: 13 October 2022

- Booked for a job: Adrian Nkwamu, Adriana Hyzopska, Borys Barchan, Krystian Embradora, Maciej Skiba, Martyna Kaczmarek, Michalina Wojciechowska, Natalia Woś & Weronika Pawelec
- Challenge winner: Natalia Woś
- First call-out: Natalia Woś
- Bottom three: Maciej Skiba, Martyna Kaczmarek & Weronika Pawelec
- Saved: Maciej Skiba
- Featured photographer: Borys Synak
- Guest judges: Aleksandra Adamska & Jessica Mercedes Kirschner
- Special guests: Gosia Baczyńska, Mariusz Przybylski, Jon Reyman

=== Episode 7 ===
Original airdate: 20 October 2022

- Challenge winners: Maciej Skiba & Michalina Wojciechowska
- First call-out: Ola Hellis
- Bottom three: Borys Barchan, Filip Ferner & Krystian Embradora
- Eliminated: Krystian Embradora
- Featured director: Natasza Parzymies
- Guest judges: Natasza Parzymies
- Special guests: Kilian Kerner, Sylwia Lipka, Michał Czernecki, Mrozu, Filip Pasternak

=== Episode 8 ===
Original airdate: 27 October 2022

- First challenge winners: Filip Ferner & Martyna Kaczmarek
- Second challenge winners: Adrian Nkwamu, Adriana Hyzopska & Borys Barchan
- First call-out: Borys Barchan & Natalia Woś
- Bottom three: Adriana Hyzopska, Filip Ferner & Weronika Pawelec
- Eliminated: Filip Ferner
- Featured photographer: Kasia Bielska
- Guest judges: Maria Dębska & Kasia Dąbrowska
- Special guests: Paweł Szkolik, Rúrik Gíslason, Sophie Trelles-Tvede, Daniel Tracz, Mateusz Mil, Kasia Szklarczyk, Dawid Woskanian, Ernest Morawski, Łukasz Bogusławski, Mariusz Jakubowski, Patrycja Sobolewska, Dominika Wysocka, Nicole Akonchong, Arek Pydych

=== Episode 9 ===
Original airdate: 3 November 2022

- Challenge winners: Adrian Nkwamu & Ola Helis
- First call-out: Maciej Skiba
- Bottom three: Adrian Nkwamu, Klaudia Nieścior & Martyna Kaczmarek
- Eliminated: Martyna Kaczmarek
- Featured director: Tala Dołgowska️️
- Guest judges: Maja Zimnoch & Paulina Krupińska
- Special guests: Anna Aksamitowska, Maja Bączyńska, Mateusz Jagodziński, Natalia Ślizowska, Monika Prus, Sylwia Butor, Ewa Sadowska, Julia Pośnik, Kuba Grochmalski, Aga Konopka

=== Episode 10 ===
Original airdate: 10 November 2022

- First challenge winners: Maciej Skiba, Natalia Woś & Ola Helis
- Second challenge winners: Adrian Nkwamu, Natalia Woś & Ola Helis
- First call-out: Klaudia Nieścior
- Bottom three: Adrian Nkwamu, Adriana Hyzopska & Weronika Pawelec
- Eliminated: Adrian Nkwamu & Weronika Pawelec
- Featured photographer: Gosia Turczyńska
- Guest judges: Joanna Lorynowicz & Maja Sieroń
- Special guests: Maja Salamon, Tobiasz Berg, Mateusz Stankiewicz, Przemek Dzienis, Żabson, Karolina Limbach

=== Episode 11 ===
Original airdate: 17 November 2022

- First challenge winners: Michalina Wojciechowska & Natalia Woś
- Second challenge winners: Klaudia Nieścior & Natalia Woś
- First call-out: Borys Barchan
- Bottom three: Maciej Skiba, Michalina Wojciechowska & Ola Helis
- Eliminated: Ola Helis
- Featured photographer: Michael Oliver Love
- Guest judge: Carol Bouwer
- Special guests: Wade Schouw, Kim Gush, Nikita Wesgate, Jessica Murray, Calista De Luz

=== Episode 12 ===
Original airdate: 24 November 2022

- Challenge winner: Michalina Wojciechowska
- First call-out: Natalia Woś
- Bottom three: Adriana Hyzopska, Maciej Skiba & Michalina Wojciechowska
- Originally eliminated: Michalina Wojciechowska
- Featured photographer: Marcin Tyszka (challenge), Sven Kristian (photoshoot)
- Guest judge: Kat Von Duinen
- Special guests: Helen Gibbs, Michael Ludwig, Ntando Ngwenya, Thando Ntuli, Jacques Van Der Watt, Hangwani Nengovhela, Jacques Bam

=== Episode 13 ===
Original airdate: 1 December 2022

- First call-out: Natalia Woś
- Bottom four: Adriana Hyzopska, Borys Barchan, Maciej Skiba & Klaudia Nieścior
- Eliminated: Adriana Hyzopska, Borys Barchan & Maciej Skiba
- Featured photographer: Marcin Tyszka
- Guest judge: Hangwani Nengovhela
- Special guests: Helen Gibbs, Michael Ludwig, Thando Ntuli, Ntando Ngwenya

=== Episode 14 ===
Original airdate: 8 December 2022

- Final three: Klaudia Nieścior, Michalina Wojciechowska & Natalia Woś
- Eliminated: Michalina Wojciechowska
- Final two: Klaudia Nieścior & Natalia Woś
- Poland's Next Top Model: Klaudia Nieścior
- Featured photographer: Dorota Szulc
- Featured director: Konrad Kozłowski
- Guest judge: Anja Rubik
- Special guests: Katarzyna Dąbrowska, Mariusz Przybylski, Karaś/Rogucki, bryska, Grzegorz Hyży

=== Episode 15 ===
Original airdate: 14 December 2022

Recap episode.

== Results ==
Order	Episodes												
Order	3 (Note: Episodes 2 and 3 were casting episodes. In episode 3, the pool of semi-finalists was reduced to the final 13 models who moved on to the main competition.)	4 (Note: Ola had been granted a 'Golden Ticket' during the show's auditions, and was therefore automatically granted a spot in the final cast.)	5	6 (Note: In episode 6, Maciej was originally eliminated, but mentor Michał Piróg, who'd been granted the opportunity of bringing one eliminated contestant back into the competition, decided to save him.)	7	8	9	10	11	12	13	14	
1	Natalia	Weronika	Klaudia	Natalia	Ola	Borys; Natalia	Maciej	Klaudia	Borys	Natalia	Natalia	Natalia	Klaudia
2	Adrian	Maciej	Krystian	Michalina	Klaudia	Borys; Natalia	Weronika	Borys	Klaudia	Borys	Michalina	Klaudia	Natalia
3	Klaudia	Natalia	Weronika	Adrian	Adrian	Martyna	Michalina	Natalia	Adriana	Klaudia	Klaudia	Michalina	
4	Adriana	Borys	Natalia	Klaudia	Weronika	Ola	Borys	Michalina	Natalia	Maciej	Adriana; Borys; Maciej		
5	Martyna	Klaudia	Borys	Krystian	Maciej	Michalina	Ola	Maciej	Maciej	Adriana	Adriana; Borys; Maciej		
6	Weronika	Michalina	Adrian	Adriana	Martyna	Adrian	Adriana	Ola	Michalina	Michalina	Adriana; Borys; Maciej		
7	Maciej	Adriana	Adriana	Filip	Natalia	Maciej	Natalia	Adriana	Ola				
8	Michalina	Filip	Martyna	Ola	Adriana	Klaudia	Klaudia	Adrian; Weronika					
9	Marcelina	Martyna	Michalina	Borys	Michalina	Weronika	Adrian	Adrian; Weronika					
10	Borys	Adrian	Filip	Weronika	Borys	Adriana	Martyna						
11	Krystian	Ola	Maciej	Martyna	Filip	Filip							
12	Karolina	Marcelina	Ola	Maciej	Krystian								
13	Filip	Krystian	Marcelina										
14		Karolina											

The contestant was eliminated.
The contestant was originally eliminated but was saved
The contestant was immune from elimination.
The contestant won the competition.

=== Photo shoots ===
- Episode 3 photo shoot: Polaroids (semifinals)
- Episode 4 photo shoot: Hanging from a trapeze
- Episode 5 photo shoot: Nude on the beach
- Episode 6 photo shoot: Underwater mermaids
- Episode 7 video shoot: Folk games
- Episode 8 photo shoot: Figure skating
- Episode 9 video shoot: Office madness
- Episode 10 photo shoot: Elle Polska
- Episode 11 photo shoot: Surfing on a sand dune
- Episode 12 photo shoot: Haute couture on a beach
- Episode 13 photo shoot: Animal print in the savanna
- Episode 14 photo shoot: Glamour covers
