= Top Model (Polish TV series) season 9 =

Top Model
- Season 9
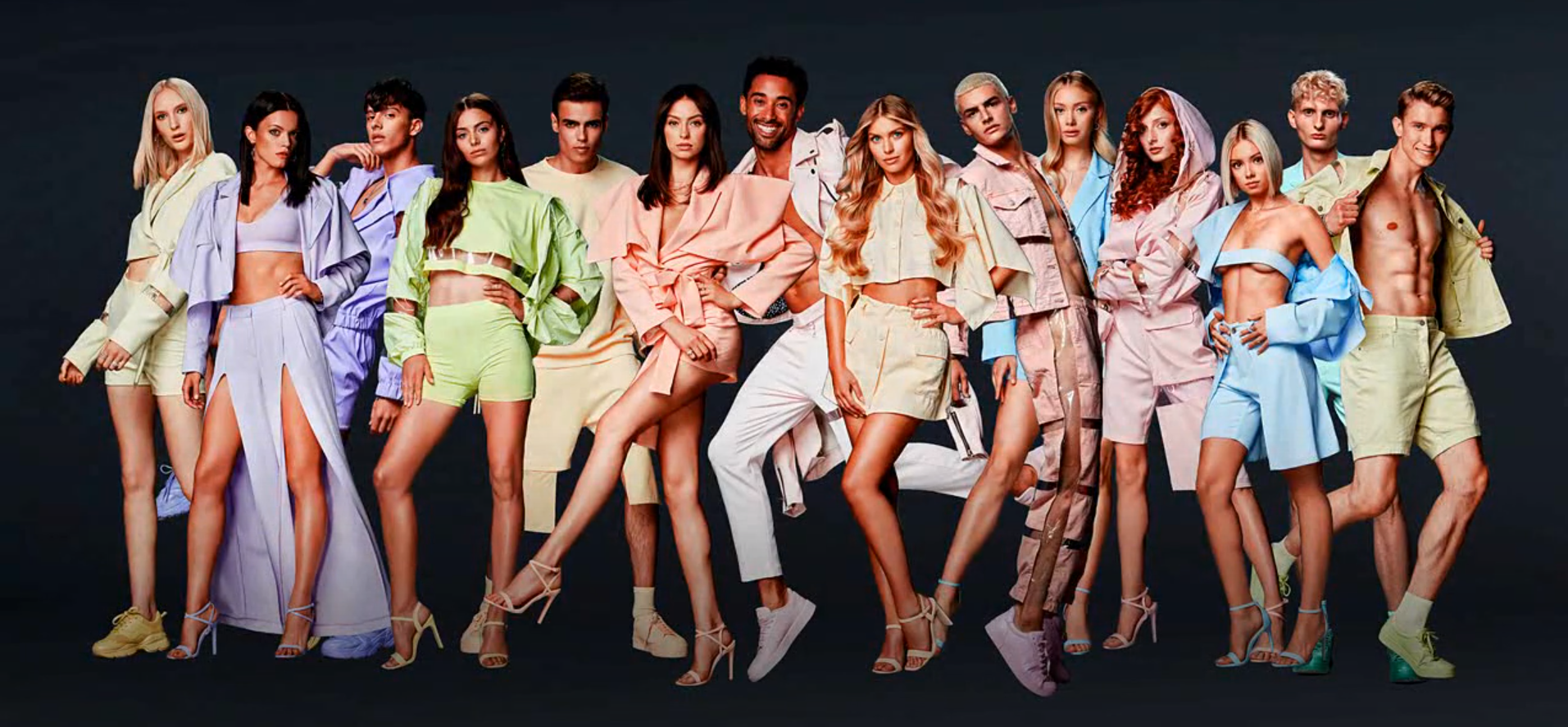
- No. of episodes: 13

Release
- Original network: TVN
- Original release: September 2 – November 25, 2020

Season chronology
- ← Previous; Season 8 Next → Season 10

Top Model, cycle 9 is the ninth cycle of an ongoing reality television series based on Tyra Banks' America's Next Top Model that pits contestants from Poland against each other in a variety of competitions to determine who will win the title of the next Polish Top Model.

Joanna Krupa, who also serves as the lead judge, returned to host the ninth cycle. Other judges included fashion designer Dawid Woliński, fashion show director Kasia Sokołowska and photographer Marcin Tyszka. This is the sixth season of the show to feature male contestants.

Among the prizes for the season were a contract with Models Plus Management, an appearance on the cover of the Polish issue of Glamour, and 100,000 złotys (US$30,000).

In this season, each judge and Michał Piróg were able to select one contestant from the online auditions. Through online voting, the winner received a Silver Ticket, which allowed them to skip the TV auditions and advance directly to bootcamp.

The international destination for this cycle was Athens & Hydra. The winner of the competition was 19 year-old Mikołaj Śmieszek, from Rabka Zdrój.

== Contestants ==
(Ages stated are at start of contest)

Contestant	Age	Height	Hometown	Finish	Place
Wiktoria Chorążak	21	1.67 m (5 ft 5 1/2 in)	Włocławek	Episode 4	13
Dominik Bereżański	21	1.88 m (6 ft 2 in)	Słupsk	Episode 5	12
Agnieszka Skrzeczkowska	30	1.71 m (5 ft 7 1/2 in)	Warsaw	Episode 6	11
Gracja Kalibabka	19	1.79 m (5 ft 10 1/2 in)	Dziwnów	Episode 7	10
Łukasz Bogusławski	21	1.95 m (6 ft 5 in)	Warsaw	Episode 8	9
Karolina Płocka	18	1.68 m (5 ft 6 in)	Wrocław	Episode 10	8
Mariusz Jakubowski	25	1.91 m (6 ft 3 in)	Gdynia	Episode 12	7-4
Maja Siwik	19	1.76 m (5 ft 9 1/2 in)	Gryfów Śląski	Episode 12	7-4
Karolina Kuczyńska	26	1.76 m (5 ft 9 1/2 in)	Łomża	Episode 12	7-4
Ernest Morawski	20	1.83 m (6 ft 0 in)	Trzcińsko Zdrój	Episode 12	7-4
Dominic D'Angelica	30	1.85 m (6 ft 1 in)	Berlin, Germany	(Disqualified)	
Weronika Kaniewska	19	1.79 m (5 ft 10 1/2 in)	Kobylarnia	Episode 13	3
Patrycja Sobolewska	23	1.71 m (5 ft 7 1/2 in)	Gąsewo	Episode 13	2
Mikołaj Śmieszek	19	1.87 m (6 ft 1 1/2 in)	Rabka Zdrój	Episode 13	1

== Episodes ==
=== Episode 1 ===
Original airdate: September 2, 2020

Auditions for the ninth season of Top Model begin, and aspiring hopefuls are chosen for the semi-final round.

- Silver ticket winner: Dominik Bereżański

=== Episode 2 ===
Original airdate: September 9, 2020

In the semi-finals, the judges begin to eliminate contestants to narrow the number of models who will battle it out for a place in the top model house.

- Golden ticket winner: Weronika Kaniewska

=== Episode 3 ===
Original airdate: September 16, 2020

In the third and final casting episode of the season, the judges chose the finalists who will move onto the main competition out of the remaining pool of contestants.

Group	Models
**One**	Gracja, **Jacek**, Karolina K., **Rodrigo**, **Oliwia**, **Maks**
**Two**	Dominik B., Karolina P., **Agata**, Dominic, Wiktoria, Łukasz,
**Three**	Agnieszka, Mikołaj, **Eliza**, Patrycja, Mariusz, **Weronika M.**, **Adrian**
**Four**	Maja, **Tomek**, **Magda**, Ernest, **Krzysztof**, **Klaudia**, **Dominik T.**

- Names in **bold** represent eliminated semi-finalists

=== Episode 4 ===
Original airdate: September 23, 2020

- Challenge winners: Gracja Kalibabka & Mikołaj Śmieszek
- Immune from elimination: Agnieszka Skrzeczkowska, Dominic D'Angelica, Dominik Bereżański, Karolina Kuczyńska, Mikołaj Śmieszek, Patrycja Sobolewska & Weronika Kaniewska
- First call-out: Ernest Morawski
- Bottom three: Gracja Kalibabka, Maja Siwik & Wiktoria Chorążak
- Eliminated: Wiktoria Chorążak
- Featured photographer: Zosia Prominska
- Special guests: Łukasz Urbański, Katarzyna Dąbrowska, Mariusz Brzozowksi, Marcin Paprocki & Marta Wojtal
- Guest judge: Julia Banas

=== Episode 5 ===
Original airdate: September 30, 2020

- First challenge winners: Dominik Bereżański, Karolina Kuczyńska, Karolina Płocka, Mikołaj Śmieszek & Weronika Kaniewska
- Second challenge winner: Weronika Kaniewska
- First call-out: Patrycja Sobolewska
- Bottom two: Dominik Bereżański & Mariusz Jakubowski
- Eliminated: Dominik Bereżański
- Featured photographer: Marcin Tyszka
- Special guests: Katarzyna Dąbrowska, Marianna Kowalewska, Anna Gacek, Ralph Kaminski & Ola Kowal
- Guest judge: Julia Wieniawa

=== Episode 6 ===
Original airdate: October 7, 2020

- Challenge winners: Dominic D'Angelica, Gracja Kalibabka, Maja Siwik & Mikołaj Śmieszek
- Booked for a job: Dominic D'Angelica & Patrycja Sobolewska (APART), Mariusz Jakubowski & Weronika Kaniewska (Elle Poland), Maja Siwik & Mariusz Jakubowski (PARS)
- First call-out: Mikołaj Śmieszek
- Bottom three: Agnieszka Skrzeczkowska, Karolina Płocka & Łukasz Bogusławski
- Eliminated: Agnieszka Skrzeczkowska
- Featured photographer: Łukasz Ziętek
- Special guests: Klaudia Halejcio, Ola Nowak, Nina Nurzyńska-Mazurek, Marta Rudowicz-Drożdż, Karolina Limbbach & Peyman Amin
- Guest judge: Patrycja Markowska

=== Episode 7 ===
Original airdate: October 14, 2020

- First challenge winners: Mikołaj Śmieszek & Weronika Kaniewska
- Second challenge winner/Immune from elimination: Patrycja Sobolewska
- Booked for a job: Ernest Morawski, Gracja Kalibabka & Weronika Kaniewska
- First call-out: Dominic D'Angelica
- Bottom three: Gracja Kalibabka, Karolina Kuczyńska & Łukasz Bogusławski
- Eliminated: Gracja Kalibabka
- Featured photographer: Szymon Brodziak
- Featured cinematographer: Andrzej Belina Brzozowski
- Special guests: Patrycja Piekarska, Bartek Bednorz & Joanna Jędrzejczyk
- Guest judges: Anna Jagodzińska, Katarzyna Dąbrowska

=== Episode 8 ===
Original airdate: October 21, 2020

- First challenge winners: Mariusz Jakubowski & Patrycja Sobolewska
- Second challenge winners: Karolina Kuczyńska & Mikołaj Śmieszek
- First call-out: Mariusz Jakubowski
- Bottom three: Karolina Płocka, Łukasz Bogusławski & Maja Siwik
- Eliminated: Łukasz Bogusławski
- Featured photographer: Marcin Tyszka, Adam Plucinski, Aga Wojtun
- Special guests: Ania Jaroszewska, Ania Markowska, Dawid Woskanian, Franek Strąkowski, Hubert Gromadzki, Kasia Szklarczyk, Klaudia El Dursi, Olga Kleczkowska, Rafał Torkowski, Staszek Obolewicz, Ewa Zgrabczyńska & Magdalena Jasek
- Guest judges: Małgorzata Rozenek-Majdan & Radosław Majdan

=== Episode 9 ===
Original airdate: October 28, 2020

- First challenge winners: Mariusz Jakubowski, Mikołaj Śmieszek & Weronika Kaniewska
- Second challenge winners: Ernest Morawski & Karolina Kuczyńska
- First call-out: Maja Siwik & Mikołaj Śmieszek
- Bottom three: Dominic D'Angelica, Karolina Kuczyńska & Patrycja Sobolewska
- Eliminated: Karolina Kuczyńska & Patrycja Sobolewska
- Saved: Patrycja Sobolewska
- Featured photographer: Magda Łoniewska
- Featured cinematographers: Anna Maliszewska, Natalia Jakubowska & Łukasz Gronowski
- Special guests: Karolina Pisarek, Marta Zawiślańska & Anna Rosik
- Guest judge: Anna Lewandowska

=== Episode 10 ===
Original airdate: November 4, 2020

- First challenge winners: Dominic D'Angelica & Weronika Kaniewska
- Second challenge winner: Patrycja Sobolewska
- Booked for a job: Mikołaj Śmieszek (Vogue Polska)
- First call-out: Mikołaj Śmieszek
- Bottom three: Ernest Morawski, Mariusz Jakubowski & Karolina Płocka
- Eliminated: Mariusz Jakubowski & Karolina Płocka
- Featured photographers: Łukasz Dziewic (challenge), Maciej Skwara (challenge)
- Special guests: Marcin Klaban, Wilson Will, Karolina Gruszecka
- Guest judges: Monika "Jac" Jagaciak, Filip Niedenthal

=== Episode 11 ===
Original airdate: November 11, 2020

- Withdrew: Dominic D'Angelica & Ernest Morawski & Patrycja Sobolewska
- Returned: Karolina Kuczyńska & Mariusz Jakubowski
- Challenge winners: Karolina Kuczyńska & Mikołaj Śmieszek
- First call-out: Mikołaj Śmieszek
- Bottom two: Karolina Kuczyńska & Weronika Kaniewska
- Eliminated: None
- Featured photographer: Dimitris Skoulos
- Special guests: Paris Valtadoros, Yiannis Togo, Lakis Gavalas, Vassilis Emmanuel Zoulias
- Guest judge: Dimitris Skoulos

=== Episode 12 ===
Original airdate: November 18, 2020

- First call-out: Mikołaj Śmieszek
- Bottom four: Karolina Kuczyńska, Maja Siwik, Mariusz Jakubowski & Weronika Kaniewska
- Eliminated: Karolina Kuczyńska, Maja Siwik & Mariusz Jakubowski
- Returned: Dominic D'Angelica & Patrycja Sobolewska
- Eliminated outside of judging panel: Ernest Morawski
- Featured photographer: Marcin Tyszka
- Special guests:
- Guest judge: Tonia Fuseki

=== Episode 13 ===
Original airdate: November 25, 2020

Scores (Note: In episode 13, Weronika was eliminated prior to the reveal of the votes, she received 1 point from the judges. The final two's votes were revealed in the official instagram account of the show where Mikołaj received 2 points while Patrycja received 1 point.)
**Nº**	**Model**	**Jury**	**Viewers**	**Total**
**1**	Mikołaj	3	2 (57%)	5
**2**	Patrycja	2	1 (43%)	3
**3**	Weronika	1	N/A	1

- Disqualified: Dominic D'Angelica
- Final three: Mikołaj Śmieszek, Patrycja Sobolewska & Weronika Kaniewska
- Eliminated: Weronika Kaniewska
- Final two: Mikołaj Śmieszek & Patrycja Sobolewska
- Poland's Next Top Model: Mikołaj Śmieszek
- Featured photographer: Filip Zwierzchowski
- Special guests: Peyman Amin, Ralph Kaminski

== Results ==
Order	Episodes											
Order	3 (Note: Episodes 1, 2 and 3 were casting episodes. In episode 3, the pool of semi-finalists was reduced to the final 13 models who moved on to the main competition.)	4 (Note: Weronika had been granted a 'Golden Ticket' during the show's auditions, and was therefore automatically granted a spot in the final cast.)	5	6	7 (Note: In episode 7, Patrycja was granted immunity from elimination.)	8	9 (Note: In episode 9, Patrycja was originally eliminated along with Karolina K., but mentor Michał Piróg, who'd been granted the opportunity of bringing one eliminated contestant back into the competition, decided to save her.)	10	11 (Note: In episode 11, Dominic, Ernest and Patrycja were barred from travelling abroad to Greece with the other remaining contestants due to having contracted COVID-19 during a filming break for the show. Karolina K. and Mariusz re-entered the competition as their replacements. Joanna informed the three evacuated contestants that they would be given a chance to return to the competition for the finale after completing a separate assignment the following week.)	12 (Note: In episode 12, the first elimination took place in Greece. Mikolaj received best picture. Karolina K., Maja, Mariusz, and Weronika landed in the bottom four. Weronika advanced to the finale, while the other three contestants were all eliminated. A second, separate, elimination took place in Poland with the three contestants who had been unable to travel overseas. Dominic and Patrycja were allowed to return for the finale, joining Mikolaj and Weronika, while Ernest was eliminated.)	13 (Note: Dominic was disqualified from the competition before the live finale in episode 13 after producers of the show were made aware of his criminal record in the United States.)	
1	Gracja	Ernest	Patrycja	Mikołaj	Dominic	Mariusz	Maja; Mikołaj	Mikołaj	Mikołaj	Mikołaj	Mikołaj	Mikołaj
2	Karolina K.	Weronika	Maja	Maja	Mikołaj	Dominic	Maja; Mikołaj	Maja	Maja	Weronika	Patrycja	Patrycja
3	Dominik	Mikołaj	Dominic	Mariusz	Maja	Patrycja	Weronika	Dominic	Mariusz	Karolina K. Maja; Mariusz	Weronika	
4	Łukasz	Patrycja	Karolina K.	Karolina K.	Weronika	Mikołaj	Karolina P.	Patrycja	Karolina K. Weronika	Karolina K. Maja; Mariusz	Dominic	
5	Karolina P.	Agnieszka	Ernest	Ernest	Mariusz	Weronika	Mariusz	Weronika	Karolina K. Weronika	Karolina K. Maja; Mariusz		
6	Wiktoria	Dominik	Weronika	Dominic	Karolina P.	Karolina K.	Ernest	Ernest	Dominic; Ernest; Patrycja	Patrycja		
7	Dominic	Dominic	Karolina P.	Patrycja	Ernest	Ernest	Dominic	Karolina P. Mariusz	Dominic; Ernest; Patrycja	Dominic		
8	Patrycja	Karolina K.	Mikołaj	Weronika	Patrycja	Maja	Patrycja	Karolina P. Mariusz	Dominic; Ernest; Patrycja	Ernest		
9	Agnieszka	Łukasz	Gracja	Gracja	Karolina K.	Karolina P.	Karolina K.					
10	Mariusz	Karolina P.	Łukasz	Karolina P.	Łukasz	Łukasz						
11	Mikołaj	Mariusz	Agnieszka	Łukasz	Gracja							
12	Ernest	Maja	Mariusz	Agnieszka								
13	Maja	Gracja	Dominik									
14		Wiktoria										

The contestant was immune from elimination.
The contestant was eliminated.
The contestant was originally eliminated but was saved.
The contestant was temporarily removed from the competition due to medical reasons.
The contestant was part of a non-elimination bottom two
The contestant was eliminated outside of judging panel.
The contestant was disqualified.
The contestant won the competition.

=== Photo shoots ===
- Episode 3 photo shoot: Group shots (semifinals)
- Episode 4 photo shoot: Supermarket couture
- Episode 5 photo shoot: Nude in a theater
- Episode 6 photo shoot: Avant-garde designs on a scaffold
- Episode 7 video shoot: Fitness
- Episode 8 photo shoot: Posing with families
- Episode 9 video shoot: Underwater romance
- Episode 10 photo shoot: Recreating museum paintings for Vogue Polska
- Episode 11 photo shoot: Posing on a ship
- Episode 12 photo shoots: Posing in Hydra Island; Editorial motion shoot
- Episode 13 photo shoots: Glamour covers, Apart Jewelry campaign

== Post–Top Model careers ==
- Wiktoria Chorążak has taken a couple of test shots and modeled for Avalonia Vintage, Be The One Bizuteria, Layla Cloth, Klaudia Klimas, Bohema Clothing, Sensum Mare Natural Skincare, Marylaw PL,... She has appeared on magazine cover and editorials for Horizont US #16 December 2020, Malvie France December 2020, Never Estonia #5 January 2021, Top Posters Russia February 2021, Rebel UK October 2021,... She retired from modeling in 2024.
- Dominik Bereżański signed with Specto Models, Fable Models Management in Guangzhou, Vip Models in Shanghai, Ever Models in Seoul, Mademoiselle Agency in Paris, Modelfabrik in Berlin, Most Wanted Models in Munich, Two Management in Barcelona & Los Angeles, Wonderwall Management & Guys Management in Milan. He has taken a couple of test shots and appeared on magazine cover and editorials for Malvie France December 2020, Top Posters Russia February 2021,... He has modeled for House, Allegro, Breuninger Germany, Pull&Bear Spain, The Chain Vintage, Eastend PL, Champion, Heal Creek Korea SS23, MCM Worldwide Korea SS23, Modivo PL, Wear Medicine PL Summer 2025, Xiaomi, Huawei China,... Beside modeling, Bereżański has appeared on music video "Nieskończone" by Kuba Szmajkowski.
- Agnieszka Skrzeczkowska pursue a career as an influencer. She has walked in fashion show for Syoss and modeled for Łukasz Jemioł, W. Kruk, YSL Beauty, Motorola,... She has taken a couple of test shots and appeared on magazine cover and editorials for Glamour February 2022, Super Express May 2022, Fashion PL Fall 2022, Viva! August 2023, Air Go! March 2024, Let’s Fly March 2024, Łódź U Fly March 2024, Live & Travel March 2024, Lubzone March 2024, Sky Surfer March 2024, Replika #117 October 2025,... Beside modeling, Skrzeczkowska has also competed on Ninja Warrior Polska 2023 and published her autobiographical called "Lesby".
- Gracja Kalibabka has taken a couple of test shots, modeled for Sugarfree PL and appeared on magazine editorials for Oczy January 2021. She retired from modeling in 2023.
- Łukasz Bogusławski signed with X Management and First Model Management in London. He has taken a couple of test shots and modeled for Adidas, Pandora, Aint Clothing, Mindout PL, Modivo PL, Relab Store, Hermetic Square, Bláire PL, McDonald's,... He has appeared on magazine cover and editorials for Kaltbult Germany, K Mag December 2020, Mirror Mirror Netherland January 2021, Elegant US February 2021, Lounge #121 April 2021, Community Russia July 2021, Holm Russia October 2021, Whitemad #14 November 2021,... Beside modeling, Bogusławski has appeared in several music videos such as "Ostatnia Noc" by Paulla, "Tańcz" by Ania Leon, "The Tower" by Luna,... He retired from modeling in 2024.
- Karolina Płocka pursue a career as an influencer. She has taken a couple of test shots and modeled for Deezee PL, Modivo PL, Mohito PL, Hermetic Square, Tatuum PL, Izabella Budryn Jewellery, Dopamina Vintage Store, Taupe PL, Xiaomi, V Centrum,... She has appeared on magazine editorials for Lśnienie May 2021, Over US June 2021, Imirage Canada #993 June 2021, Sassy & Co. Australia October 2021, Vogue September 2023,... She retired from modeling in 2024.
- Ernest Morawski signed with Model Plus Management and Uncover Models. He has taken a couple of test shots and modeled for Answear, Top Secret PL, Sinsay Clothing, Streetstyle 24 PL,... He retired from modeling in 2023.
- Karolina Kuczyńska signed with Specto Models and Flash Model Management in Istanbul. She has taken a couple of test shots and appeared on magazine cover and editorials for Swanky UK #2 March 2023. She has modeled for Paese Cosmetics, EH Selective Hair, Sinsay Clothing, Soraya PL, Ksis Wedding Atelier, Bopoco PL, Tatuum PL, Lebrate PL, Holiday Golden Resort, Suntago,... Beside modeling, Kuczyńska is the host of her own TV show Drogi Do Oświecenia and also one of the main cast of several TV series like Back To School Prawdziwy Egzamin, Nasi W Mundurach,... She retired from modeling in 2024.
- Maja Siwik has taken a couple of test shots and modeled for Martoczki Headwear. She has walked in fashion shows of Adrian Lewandowski, Klaudia Klimas,... and appeared on magazine editorials for Lśnienie, L'Officiel Baltic March 2021, Iconic Artist Italia December 2021,... She retired from modeling in 2023.
- Mariusz Jakubowski signed with X Management. He has taken a couple of test shots and walked in fashion shows for Mariusz Przybylski. He has appeared on magazine cover and editorials for Lśnienie February 2021, Moda W Polsce February 2022, Boys Boys Boys Boys Canada #24 January 2025,... and modeled for Douglas, Answear, Pilawski Spring 2021, Born2be PL, Sinsay Clothing, Klaudia Klimas, CCC Shoes & Bags, Eobuwie PL, Cat Footwear, Blauer US, Reserved Fall 2023, Tatuum PL, Łukasz Jemioł, Xiaomi,...
- Dominic D'Angelica signed with NTA Model Management in Beverly Hills, One Management in Chicago, Salt Model Agency in Atlanta, Caroline Gleason Management in Miami Beach, Signed World Agency & Wilhelmina Models in New York City. He has taken a couple of test shots and appeared on magazine cover and editorials for 20/20 US January 2022, Vous Spain #4 August 2022, Gezno France October 2022, Géode France Fall 2022, Sophisticated Weddings US SS24,... He has modeled for Calvin Klein, Bespoke Post US Fall 2021, Wellbel Hair US, Nick Graham US, Helzberg Diamonds US, Heintz Craven US, Avia Shoes US, State Bags US, Pepsi Zero Sugar, Cigarette Racing US, Celebrity Cruises US,... Beside modeling, D'Angelica also owns an eyewear line called Legendary Forms.
- Weronika Kaniewska signed with Model Plus Management, X Management, Flash Model Management in Istanbul, Agencia Models in Athens, Fleming Models in Barcelona and Mademoiselle Agency in Paris. She has taken a couple of test shots and appeared on magazine cover and editorials for Vanguard US March 2024. She has modeled for House, LC Waikiki Turkey, Nine West Turkey, Deezee PL, Naoko Store SS21, Gym Glamour, Mohito PL, Ebutik PL, Sklep Moodo FW21, Zems Turkey, The Fashion Project Greece, Lynne World Greece, Max Fashion Mena UAE, Plny Lala, Streetstyle 24 PL, Paprocki Brzozowski, Sugarfree PL, Hootomi SS23, Lancerto PL, Stars From The Stars Makeup, Miya Cosmetics, Gomez Fashion Store, Semilac PL, Eveline Cosmetics, Ysabel Mora Spain, Aleksandra Mirosław, Verona Jewellery, Atelier Rosa Suknie, Paese Cosmetics, Rever PL FW24.25, Xiaomi,...
- Patrycja Sobolewska signed with Model Plus Management, I Management and Ace Models in Athens. She has taken a couple of test shots and appeared on magazine cover and editorials for Skarb Rossmann #3 Summer 2021, Campagne Chic & Broc France #43 NOvember-December 2023-January 2024,... She has modeled for L’Oréal, Douglas, Deezee PL, Diverse System PL SS21, Triplés Brand PL FW21, Reneé PL FW21, Apart Jewellery, Mohito PL FW21, Łukasz Jemioł, El Corte Inglés SS22, Celestino Fashion, Forever Young The Label SS22, Tiffi Fashion, Assi by Mina Lambraki Summer 2022, La Vie Jewelry Greece, Tatuum PL, Lavard PL FW22, Viola Piekut, Omelia Atelier Ukraine, Vinnci Store, Bad Icon Store SS23, Hibou PL, Taranko PL, Marella Italia, Tina Valerdi, Sheila PL, Paese Cosmetics, Imolacy Romania, Ohvery PL, Xiaomi,... Beside modeling, Sobolewska has appeared on music video "Cheugy" by Bemy.
- Mikołaj Śmieszek has collected his prizes and signed with Model Plus Management. He is also signed with 3rd Management in Oslo, Two Management in Hamburg and Daman Management in Istanbul. He has taken a couple of test shots and walked in fashion show for Mariusz Przybylski. Śmieszek has modeled for Reebok, 4F Clothing, PRM Clothing, Bad Icon Store, Iced Stuff PL, Wear Medicine PL, The 100 Clothing PL, Berries & Co., Routines by Alkmie, Ryłko Shoes, Fluff Outerwear FW24, Huawei,... and appeared on magazine cover and editorials for Glamour #12 December 2020 - January 2021, Label PL March 2023, Behind The Blinds Belgium March 2023, Kaltblut Germany January 2026,...

== Ratings ==
Episode	Date	Audience	Share 4+	Share 16-49
1	2 September	1 039 558	9.59%	16.40%
2	9 September	1 167 469	11.02%	17.45%
3	16 September	1 121 627	10.54%	17.26%
4	23 September	1 240 255	11.43%	19.09%
5	30 September	1 081 657	9.69%	14.90%
6	7 October	1 184 754	10.07%	16.30%
7	14 October	1 032 760	8.18%	12.43%
8	21 October	1 187 207	9.93%	16.63%
9	28 October	1 128 166	9.43%	15.22%
10	4 November	1 182 022	9.76%	15.57%
11	11 November	1 138 470	8.59%	12.01%
12	18 November	1 133 560	8.69%	13.76%
13	25 November	1 502 377	12.11%	18.12%
Average	2020	1 164 808	9.88%	15.68%

== Controversy ==
Finalist Dominic D'Angelica was disqualified from the competition two days prior to the show's live finale due to his past criminal record of having pleaded no contest to sexual contact with a minor in the United States. Player.pl who serves as a steamer of TVN released a statement disqualifying D'Angelica from the competition.
