= Top Model. Zostań modelką season 2 =

Top Model. Zostań modelką
- Season 2
- Cycle 2 cast of Top Model. Zostań modelką
- No. of episodes: 14

Release
- Original network: TVN
- Original release: 7 September – 7 December 2011

Season chronology
- ← Previous; Season 1 Next → Season 3

Top Model. Zostań modelką, Cycle 2 (Polish for Top Model. Become a Model) is the second Cycle of an ongoing reality documentary based on Tyra Banks' America's Next Top Model that pits contestants from Poland against each other in a variety of competitions to determine who will win the title of the next Polish Top Model and a lucrative modeling contract with NEXT Model Management as well as an appearance on the cover of the Polish issue of Glamour and a nationwide Max Factor campaign in hopes of a successful future in the modeling business. The competition was hosted by Polish-born model Joanna Krupa who served as the lead judge alongside fashion designer Dawid Woliński, journalist Karolina Korwin-Piotrowska and photographer Marcin Tyszka.

The international destinations this cycle were Paris and Mombasa. The winner of the competition was 19-year-old Olga Kaczyńska from Wrocław.

== Contestants ==
(ages stated are at start of contest)

| Contestant | Age | Height | Hometown | Finish | Place |
|---|---|---|---|---|---|
| Karolina Hennig | 19 | 1.80 m (5 ft 11 in) | Elbląg | Episode 5 | 13 |
| Gabriela 'Gabrysia' Pacholarz | 19 | 1.70 m (5 ft 7 in) | Maćkówka | Episode 6 | 12 |
| Magdalena 'Magda' Roman | 21 | 1.78 m (5 ft 10 in) | Lębork | Episode 7 | 11 |
| Natalia Piaskowska | 21 | 1.73 m (5 ft 8 in) | Szczecin | Episode 8 | 10 |
| Vera Suprunenko | 24 | 1.77 m (5 ft 9 1/2 in) | Lviv, Ukraine | Episode 9 | 9 (DQ) |
| Viktoria Driuk | 18 | 1.70 m (5 ft 7 in) | Marki | Episode 10 | 8 |
| Oliwia Downar-Dukowicz | 20 | 1.71 m (5 ft 7 1/2 in) | Poznań | Episode 11 | 7–6 |
| Dorota Trojanowska | 23 | 1.79 m (5 ft 10 1/2 in) | Grudziądz | Episode 11 | 7–6 |
| Honorata Wojtkowska | 19 | 1.76 m (5 ft 9 1/2 in) | Legnica | Episode 12 | 5 |
| Joanna 'Asia' Kudzbalska | 19 | 1.78 m (5 ft 10 in) | Wrocław | Episode 13 | 4 |
| Michalina Manios | 23 | 1.81 m (5 ft 11 1/2 in) | Szadek | Episode 14 | 3 |
| Anna 'Ania' Bałon | 18 | 1.81 m (5 ft 11 1/2 in) | Opole | Episode 14 | 2 |
| Olga Kaczyńska | 19 | 1.78 m (5 ft 10 in) | Wrocław | Episode 14 | 1 |

== Episodes ==
=== Episode 1 ===
Original Air Date: September 7, 2011

The judges begin their search for Poland's Next Top Model, and hold castings across the country.

=== Episode 2 ===
Original Air Date: September 14, 2011

The search continues as hopefuls make their way into the semi-finals in the hope of becoming Poland's next top model.

=== Episode 3 ===
Original Air Date: September 21, 2011

The remaining spots for the semi-finals are finally filled, and the top fifty contestants are taken to the Polish countryside. They take part in a lingerie fashion show, and it's goodbye for three of the semi-finalists as their dream comes to an end.

=== Episode 4 ===
Original Air Date: September 28, 2011

The final round of boot-camp takes place. After an elimination, the remaining semi-finalists are challenged to perform in front of the camera with their fellow models. The girls are divided into four groups with different themes, all having to do with farm life.

| Group | Models |
|---|---|
| **One** | **Angelika**, **Agnieszka**, Dorota, Honorata, **Kinga**, **Ola** & Olga |
| **Two** | Ania B., **Dagmara**, Karolina H., Magda, Michalina, **Ola** & **Paulina** |
| **Three** | Gabrysia, **Greta**, Oliwia, Vera & Viktoria |
| **Four** | **Aneta**, **Ania R.**, Asia, **Kamila**, **Karolina**, **Lilith**, Natalia & **Sandra** |

- Names in **bold** represent eliminated semi-finalists

After reviewing all the pictures, Joanna and the judges choose the final thirteen models who will compete for the title of Poland's Next Top Model.

=== Episode 5 ===
Original Air Date: October 5, 2011

- Challenge winner: Vera Suprunenko
- First call-out: Asia Kudzbalska
- Bottom three: Ania Bałon, Gabrysia Pacholarz & Karolina Henning
- Eliminated: Karolina Henning
- Featured photographer: Robert Wolański
- Special guests: Anja Rubik, Marcin Iwo Kosiński

=== Episode 6 ===
Original Air Date: October 12, 2011

- Challenge winner: Viktoria Driuk
- First call-out: Ania Bałon
- Bottom three: Asia Kudzbalska, Dorota Trojanowska & Gabriela Pacholarz
- Eliminated: Gabriela Pacholarz
- Featured photographer: Daniel Duniak & Grzegorz Korzeniowski
- Special guests: Wayne Sterling

=== Episode 7 ===
Original Air Date: October 19, 2011

- First call-out: None, since there were no call-outs due to Magda being automatically eliminated from the competition for not participating in the photo shoot. In episode 8, however, Olga was told she would have been the first call-out had they been held.
- Eliminated: Magda Roman
- Featured photographer: Wojtek Wojtczak & Iza Grzybowska
- Special guests: Anja Rubik

=== Episode 8 ===
Original Air Date: October 26, 2011

| Model | Food |
|---|---|
| Ania | Oxtail |
| Dorota | Liver |
| Honorata | Testicles |
| Asia | Chocolate |
| Michalina | Fish |
| Natalia | Pomegranate |
| Olga | Crab |
| Oliwia | Squid |
| Vera | Lobster |
| Viktoria | Spaghetti |

- First call-out: Dorota Trojanowska
- Bottom two: Asia Kudzbalska & Natalia Piaskowska
- Eliminated: Natalia Piaskowska
- Featured photographer: Łukasz Ziętek
- Special guests: Magda Gessler, Martyna Wojciechowska, Teresa Rosati, Tomasz Jacyków, Ewa Minge, Robert Kupisz, Gosia Baczyńska

=== Episode 9 ===
Original Air Date: November 2, 2011

| Film warrior | Models |
|---|---|
| Alice - Resident Evil | Michalina & Viktoria |
| Cherry darling - Planet Terror | Dorota |
| Guinevere - King Arthur | Asia & Vera |
| Insidious entity - Mad Max | Honorata & Olga |
| Moon - Hero | Ania & Oliwia |

- Immune/first call-out: Michalina Manios
- Bottom two: Ania Bałon & Vera Suprunenko
- Disqualified: Vera Suprunenko
- Featured photographer: Emil Biliński
- Special guests: Kazimierz Mazur, Asia Jabłyczńska, Tomasz Schimscheiner

=== Episode 10 ===
Original Air Date: November 9, 2011

| Model | Model stereotype |
|---|---|
| Ania | Bulimic |
| Dorota & Michalina | Bitchy |
| Honorata | Drug addict |
| Asia | Addicted to surgery |
| Olga | Dumb |
| Oliwia | Casting couch |
| Viktoria | Diva |

- First call-out: Asia Kudzbalska
- Bottom three: Dorota Trojanowska, Oliwia Downar-Dukowicz & Viktoria Driuk
- Eliminated: Viktoria Driuk
- Featured photographer: Aldona Karczmarczyk
- Special guests: Ania Jurgaś

=== Episode 11 ===
Original Air Date: November 16, 2011

- First call-out: Honorata Wojtkowska
- Bottom four: Ania Bałon, Asia Kudzbalska, Dorota Trojanowska & Oliwia Downar-Dukowicz
- Eliminated: Dorota Trojanowska & Oliwia Downar-Dukowicz
- Featured photographer: Marcin Tyszka
- Special guests: Peyman Amin

=== Episode 12 ===
Original Air Date: November 23, 2011

- First call-out: Olga Kaczyńska
- Bottom two: Honorata Wojtkowska & Michalina Manios
- Eliminated: Honorata Wojtkowska
- Featured photographer: Andre Rau
- Special guests: Vincent McDoom

=== Episode 13 ===
Original Air Date: November 30, 2011

- First call-out: Olga Kaczyńska
- Bottom two: Asia Kudzbalska & Michalina Manios
- Eliminated: Asia Kudzbalska
- Featured photographer: Guillaume Malheiro
- Special guests: Michał Piróg

=== Episode 14 ===
Original Air Date: December 7, 2011

- Final three: Ania Bałon, Michalina Manios & Olga Kaczyńska
- Eliminated: Michalina Manios
- Final two: Ania Bałon & Olga Kaczyńska
- Poland's Next Top Model: Olga Kaczyńska
- Special guests: Anja Rubik, Joel Wilkenfeld (President of NEXT NY)

== Summaries ==
=== Call-out order ===
| Order | Episodes | | | | | | | | | | | |
| Order | 4 | 5 | 6 | 7 | 8 | 9 | 10 | 11 | 12 | 13 | 14 | |
|---|---|---|---|---|---|---|---|---|---|---|---|---|
| 1 | Dorota | Asia | Ania | Olga | Dorota | Michalina | Asia | Honorata | Olga | Olga | Olga | Olga |
| 2 | Honorata | Oliwia | Viktoria | Ania; Asia; Dorota; Honorata; Michalina; Natalia; Oliwia; Vera; Viktoria | Olga | Asia | Ania | Olga | Asia | Ania | Ania | Ania |
| 3 | Olga | Honorata | Oliwia | Ania; Asia; Dorota; Honorata; Michalina; Natalia; Oliwia; Vera; Viktoria | Vera | Honorata | Olga | Michalina | Ania | Michalina | Michalina | |
| 4 | Karolina | Magda | Honorata | Ania; Asia; Dorota; Honorata; Michalina; Natalia; Oliwia; Vera; Viktoria | Viktoria | Oliwia | Michalina | Dorota | Michalina | Asia | | |
| 5 | Magda | Viktoria | Magda | Ania; Asia; Dorota; Honorata; Michalina; Natalia; Oliwia; Vera; Viktoria | Ania | Olga | Honorata | Asia | Honorata | | | |
| 6 | Michalina | Natalia | Olga | Ania; Asia; Dorota; Honorata; Michalina; Natalia; Oliwia; Vera; Viktoria | Michalina | Dorota | Dorota | Ania | | | | |
| 7 | Ania | Vera | Michalina | Ania; Asia; Dorota; Honorata; Michalina; Natalia; Oliwia; Vera; Viktoria | Honorata | Viktoria | Oliwia | Oliwia | | | | |
| 8 | Vera | Michalina | Vera | Ania; Asia; Dorota; Honorata; Michalina; Natalia; Oliwia; Vera; Viktoria | Oliwia | Vera | Viktoria | | | | | |
| 9 | Oliwia | Dorota | Natalia | Ania; Asia; Dorota; Honorata; Michalina; Natalia; Oliwia; Vera; Viktoria | Asia | Ania | | | | | | |
| 10 | Gabrysia | Olga | Dorota | Ania; Asia; Dorota; Honorata; Michalina; Natalia; Oliwia; Vera; Viktoria | Natalia | | | | | | | |
| 11 | Viktoria | Gabrysia | Asia | Magda | | | | | | | | |
| 12 | Asia | Ania | Gabrysia | | | | | | | | | |
| 13 | Natalia | Karolina | | | | | | | | | | |

The contestant was eliminated
The contestant was put through collectively to the next round
The contestant was immune from elimination
The contestant was disqualified from the competition
The contestant was the original eliminee, but was saved
The contestant won the competition

- Episodes 1, 2, 3 and 4 were casting episodes. In episode 4, the pool of semi-finalists was reduced to the final 13 models who moved on to the main competition.
- Episodes 5 and 6 featured the bottom three contestants who were in danger of elimination.
- In episode 7, Magda was automatically eliminated from the competition at panel for not participating in the photo shoot. Therefore, no call-out was held that episode. In the next episode it was revealed that Olga would have received the best photo.
- In episode 9, the best-performing contestant from each photo shoot pair was deemed immune to the panel. Earlier that week Vera had made a phone call from her cellphone, which was against the rules of the show. She was disqualified from the competition at panel when she landed in the bottom two, automatically saving Ania from elimination.
- In episode 11, Ania, Dorota, Asia and Oliwia landed in the bottom four. Dorota was called and was told she was eliminated. Joanna handed the last two photos to Ania and Asia, eliminating Oliwia.

=== Photo shoot guide ===
- Episode 4 photo shoot: Country girls in groups (semifinals)
- Episode 5 photo shoot: Posing with nude male model Marcin Iwo Kosiński
- Episode 6 photo shoot: Suspended in the air
- Episode 7 photo shoot: Nude fashion editorial
- Episode 8 photo shoot: Food kitchen editorial
- Episode 9 photo shoot: Film warriors
- Episode 10 photo shoot: Portraying model stereotypes
- Episode 11 photo shoots: Hollywood icon impersonations; natural & sexy beauty
- Episode 12 photo shoot: High fashion in the streets of Paris
- Episode 13 photo shoot: Futuristic fashion
- Episode 14 photo shoot: Glamour magazine covers & spreads in Kenya

== Ratings ==
| Episode | Date | Audience | Share 4+ | Share 16-49 |
|---|---|---|---|---|
| 1 | 7 September | 2 541 981 | 20.91% | 24.08% |
| 2 | 14 September | 2 724 641 | 22.23% | 25.40% |
| 3 | 21 September | 2 618 949 | 22.18% | 24.93% |
| 4 | 28 September | 2 884 312 | 24.00% | 30.10% |
| 5 | 5 October | 2 549 432 | 20.84% | 24.18% |
| 6 | 12 October | 2 760 534 | 21.35% | 25.81% |
| 7 | 19 October | 2 790 281 | 21.56% | 25.28% |
| 8 | 26 October | 2 842 109 | 21.95% | 25.70% |
| 9 | 2 November | 2 777 900 | 22.36% | 26.83% |
| 10 | 9 November | 2 752 990 | 21.44% | 24.16% |
| 11 | 16 November | 2 578 268 | 20.23% | 22.93% |
| 12 | 23 November | 2 518 469 | 18.86% | 21.70% |
| 13 | 30 November | 2 692 179 | 20.72% | 24.47% |
| 14 | 7 December | 2 718 769 | 22.32% | 25.22% |
| Average | 2011 | 2 697 666 | 21.50% | 25.05% |
