= Top Model (Polish TV series) =

Polish reality television series

- Genre: Reality television
- Created by: Tyra Banks
- Directed by: Piotr Wawrzyniak
- Presented by: Joanna Krupa
- Opening theme: SheMoans - "Super Girl" (Season 1); SheMoans - "Super Girl" remix (Seasons 2-4); Wojciech Kilar - "Trędowata" (Season 8); Ted Griggs - "Supermodel" (Season 12)
- Country of origin: Poland
- Original language: Polish
- No. of seasons: 15

Production
- Executive producers: Rinke Rooyens; Ewa Leja
- Running time: 45 minutes (Season 1-7); 65 minutes (Season 8-)
- Production companies: Rochstar; TVN

Original release
- Network: TVN
- Release: September 8, 2010 – present

Top Model (formerly Top Model. Zostań modelką (English: Top Model. Become a Model)) is a Polish reality television series based on Tyra Banks' America's Next Top Model, which sees a number of aspiring models compete against each other in a variety of competitions to win the title of Top Model among other prizes in hopes of a successful career in the modeling business.

The competition is hosted by Polish American model Joanna Krupa, who serves as the lead judge. The other members of the judging panel are fashion designer Dawid Woliński, runway coach Kasia Sokołowska, photographer Marcin Tyszka and fashion stylist Ewelina Gralak. Model Anja Rubik has made several guest appearances throughout the show's run.

== Judges ==
Judges	Season														
Judges	1	2	3	4	5	6	7	8	9	10	11	12	13	14	15
Hosts
Joanna Krupa	Head Judge	Head Judge	Head Judge	Head Judge	Head Judge	Head Judge	Head Judge	Head Judge	Head Judge	Head Judge	Head Judge	Head Judge	Head Judge	Head Judge	Head Judge
Judging Panelists
Karolina Korwin Piotrowska	Main	Main													
Marcin Tyszka	Main	Main	Main	Main	Main	Main	Main	Main	Main	Main	Main	Main	Main	Main	Main
Dawid Woliński	Main	Main	Main	Main	Main	Main	Main	Main	Main	Main	Main	Main	Main	Main	Main
Katarzyna Sokołowska			Main	Main	Main	Main	Main	Main	Main	Main	Main	Main	Main	Main	Main
Ewelina Gralak															Main
Mentors
Magda Mielcarz	Mentor														
Michał Piróg	Mentor	Mentor	Mentor	Mentor	Mentor	Mentor	Mentor	Mentor	Mentor	Mentor	Mentor	Mentor	Mentor	Mentor	
Weronika Lewicka	Contestant	Mentor													
Sylwia Butor												Mentor			
Sofia Konecka-Menescal												Contestant	Mentor		
Klaudia El Dursi								Contestant							Mentor

== Format ==
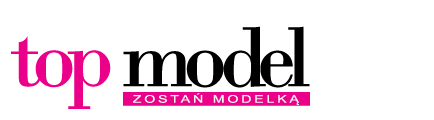
Former Top Model. Zostań modelką logo (2010–2013)

=== Challenges ===
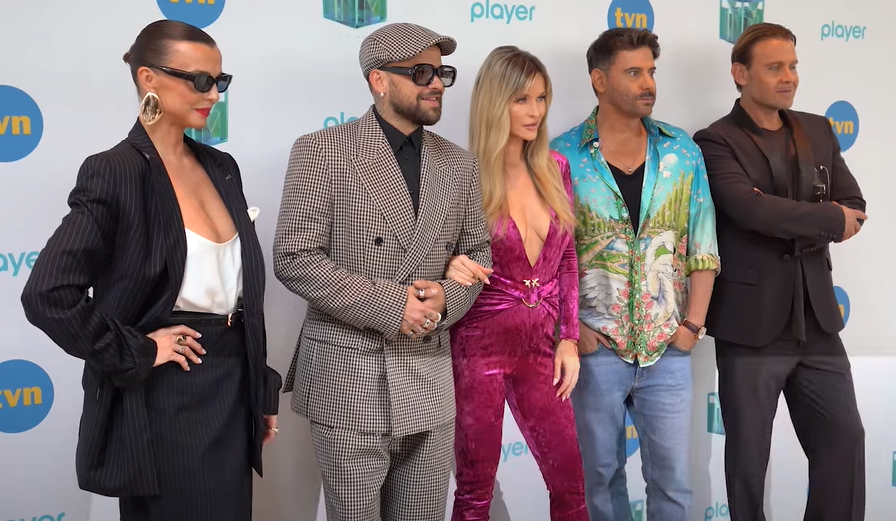
Judges (2023)

Challenges generally focus on elements important to modeling which will help the contestants improve for the week's photo shoot. A guest judge evaluates the contestants and decides the winner of each challenge. The winner of the challenge receives a prize for their victory, such as immunity from elimination for the week. Sometimes the challenge winner is permitted to choose a certain number of other contestants to share their reward, while the others receive no prize.

=== Judging and elimination ===
Once a week, based on the models' performance in the week's challenge, photo shoot, and general attitude, the judges are required to eliminate one contestant from the competition. During the elimination ceremony, the host calls out the names of the contestants who are still in the competition, handing them a copy of their best photo from the shoot. The two or three worst-performing models of the week are in danger of elimination, and one of them is eliminated. In some cases, the series sees double or triple eliminations and non-eliminations by consensus of the judging panel. From Cycle 5 onward, Michal Piróg has one opportunity during the entire cycle to save one originally eliminated person.

=== Differences from America's Next Top Model ===
In contrast to America's Next Top Model, in which each cycle begins with preliminary rounds that span one or two episodes and around 30 pre-selected semi-finalists, Top Model begins with several rounds of open auditions held in cities across Poland, followed by a "bootcamp" which concludes with the selection of the final cast of 13 to 16, with the casting process spanning three or four episodes. In Cycle 13 and 14, the "bootcamp" was removed; instead 20 people were qualified to Top Model House, from which the final fourteen was chosen. In Cycle 15 open castings were introduced, after which the 30 selected people were divided into two Top Model Houses. In Cycles 8 to 13, the judges gave one contestant from the auditions a Golden Ticket, which granted an immediate access to the final cast. In Cycles 9 to 12 there was also a Silver Ticket for the one person selected from online auditions which advanced to the "bootcamp".
Contestants are sometimes split into pairs for photo shoots, and the better-performing contestant from each pair is determined during the evaluation panel and granted immunity. Each cycle concludes with a live broadcast in which the final three or four contestants compete in front of a live audience, and a televote decides the winner of the competition.

== Cycles ==
Discussion ongoing...

Cycle	Premiere date	Winner	Runner-up	Other contestants in order of elimination	Number of contestants	International Destinations
1	8 September 2010	Paulina Papierska	Ola Kuligowska	Zuza Walkowiak, Sonia Wesołowska, Paulina Pszech, Nicole Rosłoniec (quit), Pamela Jedziniak, Marta Szulawiak, Emilia Pietras, Magda Swat, Beata Szarłowska, Weronika Lewicka, Kasia Smolińska, Ania Piszczałka	14	Milan
2	7 September 2011	Olga Kaczyńska	Ania Bałon	Karolina Hennig, Gabrysia Pacholarz, Magda Roman, Natalia Piaskowska, Vera Suprunenko (disqualified), Viktoria Driuk, Oliwia Downar-Dukowicz & Dorota Trojanowska, Honorata Wojtkowska, Asia Kudzbalska, Michalina Manios	13	Paris; Mombasa
3	6 March 2013	Zuza Kołodziejczyk	Marcela Leszczak	Ksenia Chlebicka, Ola Antas, Anna Piechowiak, Ania Koryto, Marta Zimlińska, Ola Krysiak, Asia Zaremska, Ania Cybulska, Justyna Pawlicka, Tamara Subbotko, Renata Kurczab, Klaudia Strzyżewska	14	Mumbai; Funchal
4	1 September 2014	Osi Ugonoh	Michał Baryza	Karolina Kaczyńska, Michał Kaszyński, Ola Grzegorczyk, Adam Boguta, Mateusz Maga, Misza Czumaczenko, Ewelina Pachucka, Ola Żuraw, Michalina Strabel, Mateusz Jarzębiak, Marta Sędzicka	13	Lisbon; Puerto del Rosario
5	7 September 2015	Radek Pestka	Karolina Pisarek	Justyna Łopian, Jagoda Judzińska, Sebastian Zawiliński & Ola Ławnik-Sadkowska, Michael Mikołajczuk, Natalia Gulkowska (quit), Kamila Ibrom & Andre Whyte, Samuel Kowalski, Magda Stępień-Kolesnikow & Karolina Gilon, Jakob Kosel	14	Tel Aviv; Ho Chi Minh City; Cần Thơ; Arrecife
6	6 September 2016	Patryk Grudowicz	Ewa Niespodziana	Kamil Popławski, Zuza Matysiak, Mariusz Tomczak, Sasza Muzheiko, Ola Zbinkowska, Mateusz Zapotocki, Kamila Warzecha, Mateusz Mil, Adam Niedźwiedź, Ada Daniel, Natalia Karabasz & Daniel Tracz, Daria Zhalina	15	Madrid; Campo de Criptana; Eilat
7	3 September 2018	Kasia Szklarczyk	Hubert Gromadzki	Julia Frankowicz, Natalia Gorączka, Sophie Reich & Franek Strąkowski, Żaklina Ta Dinh, Piotr Muszyński, Szymon Reich & Oliwia Zasada, Daria Dąbrowska, Michał Borzuchowski & Magda Przybielska, Ania Markowska	14	Sölden; Los Angeles; Antananarivo; Hamburg
8	2 September 2019	Dawid Woskanian	Olga Kleczkowska	Radek Czekański, Denis Chmielewski (disqualified), Nikola Furman (quit), Magda Karwacka, Rafał Torkowski & Kinga Dębska, Marcin Chowaniak, Klaudia Chojnacka, Michał Gała & Ania Jaroszewska, Kinga Wawrzyniak, Klaudia El Dursi, Sandra Dorsz, Staszek Obolewicz	16	London; Moscow; Tel Aviv; Jerusalem; Istanbul; Morón
9	2 September 2020	Mikołaj Śmieszek	Patrycja Sobolewska	Wiktoria Chorążak, Dominik Bereżański, Agnieszka Skrzeczkowska, Gracja Kalibabka, Łukasz Bogusławski, Karolina Płocka, Mariusz Jakubowski & Maja Siwik & Karolina Kuczyńska, Ernest Morawski, Dominic D'Angelica (disqualified), Weronika Kaniewska	14	Athens; Hydra
10	1 September 2021	Dominika Wysocka	Nicole Akonchong	Kacper Orenkiewicz, Bartek Kloch, Wiktoria Pawliszewska, Olga Król, Łukasz Wasielewski, Sophia Mokhar (quit), Adam Lochyński, Ola Skubis & Arek Pydych, Weronika Zoń, Mikołaj Krawiecki & Kacper Jasiński, Julia Sobczyńska	15	Prague; Malé
11	7 September 2022	Klaudia Nieścior	Natalia Woś	Karolina Kuracińska, Marcelina Zetler, Krystian Embradora, Filip Ferner, Martyna Kaczmarek, Weronika Pawelec & Adrian Nkwamu, Ola Helis, Maciej Skiba & Borys Barchan & Adriana Hyzopska, Michalina Wojciechowska	14	Cape Town; Johannesburg; Punta Cana
12	2 September 2023	Dominik Szymański	Sofia Konecka-Menescal	Zoja Sinitchine, Oliwier Sobczyk & Noemi Penczylo, Mateusz Dziedzic, Wiktoria Burejza, Róża Różańska, Tadeusz Mikołajczak & Marta Szatańska, Filip Krogulski, Amelia Wnęk & Aleks Synkariow, Natalia Węgrzynowska, Wiktoria Darda	15	Paris; Split; Copenhagen; Odense; Salvador
13	4 September 2024	Klaudia Zioberczyk	Hubert Włodarczak	Sara Stankiewicz, Masha Misevich (quit) & Mateusz Nowak, Ola Zyśk, Filip Blecharczyk, Tymek Zimny, Julia Knach & Grzegorz Gastman, Piotr Gabor-Koprowski & Maja Słodzińska, Karolina Sobótka, Ada Podsiadała	14	Lisbon; Málaga; Tabernas
14	3 September 2025	Michał Kot	Mateusz Król	Oliwier Przybylski, Robert Kaznowski, Oksana Metelna, Sara Anwar, Daniel Wieczorek, Madzia Czyżewska & Krzysiek Lib, Yaritza Reyes-Zmysłowska & Monika Antosz & Asia Madejska, Eva Pietruk, Emilia Weltrowska	14	Dublin; Lough Tay; Salalah
15	2 September 2026	TBA	TBA	Jula Brzostek, Jan Świerczewski, Igor Michalczyk, Leni Lisek, Igor Sielicki, Weronika Pusta, Tymek Rozbicki, Julia Ueda & Hugon Jamróz & Gabi Filipkowska, Benjamin Nhial; Still in the running: Dominik Pytel, Helena Pszczoła, Jakub Bara, Kuba Stanicki, Martyna Hildebrand, Mira Majchrzak	17	Berlin; Copenhagen; Ljubljana; Piran; Puerto del Rosario
