= Top Model (Polish TV series) season 12 =

Top Model
- Season 12
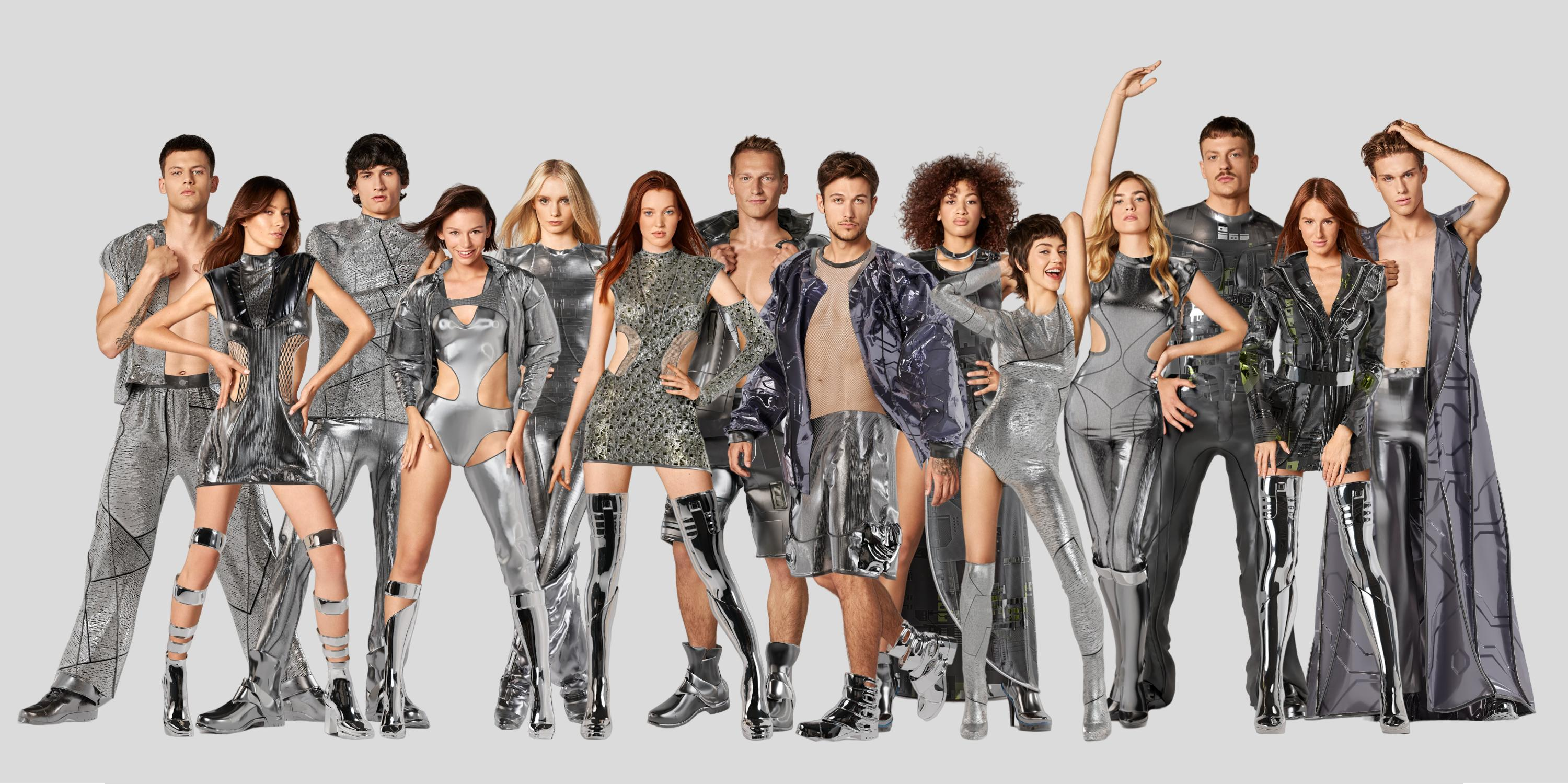
- Success is near, have no fear!
- No. of episodes: 13

Release
- Original network: TVN
- Original release: September 2 – November 25, 2023

Season chronology
- ← Previous; Season 11 Next → Season 13

Top Model, cycle 12 is the twelfth cycle of an ongoing reality television series based on Tyra Banks' America's Next Top Model that pits contestants from Poland against each other in a variety of competitions to determine who will win the title of the next Polish Top Model.

Joanna Krupa, who also serves as the lead judge, reprised her role as host for the twelfth season. Other judges included fashion designer Dawid Woliński, fashion show director Kasia Sokołowska and photographer Marcin Tyszka. This is the ninth season of the show to feature male contestants.

Among the new prizes for the season are a contract with Selective Management, an appearance on the cover of the Polish issue of Glamour, and 200,000 złotys (US$45,000).

The international destination this cycle was Paris, Split, Copenhagen, Odense and Salvador.

The winner of the competition was 21-year-old Dominik Szymański from Siedlce.

== Cast ==
=== Contestants ===
(Ages stated are at start of contest)

Contestant	Age	Height	Hometown	Finish	Place
Zoja Sinitchine	23	1.78 m (5 ft 10 in)	Łódź	Episode 4	15
Oliwier Sobczyk	22	1.86 m (6 ft 1 in)	Kielce	Episode 5	14-13
Noemi Penczylo	19	1.81 m (5 ft 11 1/2 in)	Gdynia	Episode 5	14-13
Mateusz Dziedzic	24	1.88 m (6 ft 2 in)	Chełm	Episode 7	12
Wiktoria Burejza	21	1.78 m (5 ft 10 in)	Kozy	Episode 8	11
Wiktoria 'Róża' Różańska	18	1.80 m (5 ft 11 in)	Toruń	Episode 9	10
Tadeusz Mikołajczak	25	1.89 m (6 ft 2 1/2 in)	Warsaw	Episode 10	9-8
Marta Szatańska	24	1.75 m (5 ft 9 in)	Warsaw	Episode 10	9-8
Filip Krogulski	27	1.83 m (6 ft 0 in)	Copenhagen, Denmark	Episode 11	7
Amelia Wnęk	22	1.79 m (5 ft 10 1/2 in)	Warsaw	Episode 12	6-5
Aleksandr 'Aleks' Szynkariow	22	1.85 m (6 ft 1 in)	Warsaw	Episode 12	6-5
Natalia Węgrzynowska	23	1.76 m (5 ft 9 1/2 in)	Rawa Mazowiecka	Episode 13	4
Wiktoria Darda	17	1.80 m (5 ft 11 in)	Derby, United Kingdom	Episode 13	3
Sofia Konecka-Menescal	17	1.65 m (5 ft 5 in)	Osowiec	Episode 13	2
Dominik Szymański	21	1.91 m (6 ft 3 in)	Siedlce	Episode 13	1

=== Judges ===
- Joanna Krupa – Host and head judge
- Dawid Woliński – Designer
- Katarzyna Sokołowska – Fashion director
- Marcin Tyszka – Photographer

=== Other cast members ===
- Michał Piróg – Mentor

== Episodes ==
No. overall	No. in season	Title	Original release date
148	1	"Episode 1"	2 September 2023
Auditions for the twelfth season of Top Model begin, and aspiring hopefuls are chosen for the semi-final round.: Silver ticket winner: Lena Gruczka
149	2	"Episode 2"	9 September 2023
In the semi-finals, the judges begin to eliminate contestants to narrow the number of models who will battle it out for a place in the top model house.: Golden ticket winner: Tadeusz Mikołajczak
150	3	"Episode 3"	16 September 2023
In the season's third and final casting episode, the judges chose the finalists who will move on to the main competition out of the remaining pool of contestants.: Featured photographer: Marcin Tyszka; Guest judge: Selina Popp
151	4	"Episode 4"	23 September 2023
Challenge winner: Amelia Wnęk; First call-out: Aleks Szynkariow & Natalia Węgrzynowska; Bottom three: Marta Szatańska, Noemi Penczyło & Zoja Sinitchine; Eliminated: Zoja Sinitchine; Featured photographer: Pawel Fabjanski; Guest judge: Daniela Peštová; Special guests: Mariusz Przybylski
152	5	"Episode 5"	30 September 2023
Challenge winner: Róża Różańska & Sofia Konecka-Menescal; First call-out: Dominik Symański & Róża Różańska; Bottom four: Mateusz Dziedzic, Noemi Penczyło, Oliwier Sobczyk & Wiktoria Darda; Eliminated: Noemi Penczyło & Oliwier Sobczyk; Featured director: Ralph Kamiński; Guest judges: Katarzyna Dąbrowska & Ralph Kamiński; Special guests: Sylwia Butor, Ewelina Adamska-Porczyk
153	6	"Episode 6"	7 October 2023
Booked for a job: Dominik Symański, Marta Szatańska, Natalia Węgrzynowska, Sofia Konecka-Menescal, Tadeusz Mikołajczak & Wiktoria Darda; Challenge winner: Aleks Szynkariow & Wiktoria Burejza; First call-out: Natalia Węgrzynowska; Bottom three: Aleks Szynkariow, Filip Krogulski & Mateusz Dziedzic; Saved: Aleks Szynkariow; Featured photographer: Jakub Pleśniarski (Challenge Shoot) & Weronika Kosińska; Guest judges: Zuza Kołodziejczyk (Winner, Cycle 3); Special guests: Łukasz Jemioł, Asia Piwka, Alicja Sobczak, Marta Łachacz
154	7	"Episode 7"	14 October 2023
Booked for a job: Wiktoria Darda; Challenge winner: Amelia Wnęk, Dominik Szymański, Wiktoria Darda & Sofia Konecka-Menescal; First call-out: Wiktoria Darda; Bottom three: Mateusz Dziedzic, Róża Różańska & Wiktoria Burejza; Eliminated: Mateusz Dziedzic; Featured photographer: Kevin Ostajewski (Challenge Shoot) & Marcin Tyszka (Marie Claire); Guest judges: Sabina Jakubowicz; Special guests: Maja Sieroń, Magdalena Fraj, & Paris Hilton (Video message)
155	8	"Episode 8"	21 October 2023
Booked for a job: Wiktoria Darda, Sofia Konecka-Menescal & Dominik Szymański; Challenge winner: Natalia Węgrzynowska; First call-out: Sofia Konecka-Menescal; Bottom three: Wiktoria Darda, Róża Różańska & Wiktoria Burejza; Eliminated: Wiktoria Burejza; Featured photographer: Marcin Tyszka (Challenge Shoot) & Paweł Kocan; Guest judges: Magdalena Boczarska; Special guests: Helena Englert, Ofelia, Ewa Chodakowska
156	9	"Episode 9"	28 October 2023
Challenge winner: Filip Krogulski; First call-out: Wiktoria Darda; Bottom three: Marta Szatańska, Róża Różańska & Tadeusz Mikołajczak; Eliminated: Róża Różańska; Featured photographer: Mateusz Stefanowski; Guest judges: Maciej Musiał & Natalia Kaczmarek; Special guests: Adrian Nkwamu (Cycle 11), Łukasz Bogusławski (Cycle 9), Ania Markowska (Cycle 7), Staszek Obolewicz (Cycle 8), Klaudia Nieścior (Winner, Cycle 11), Dominika Wysocka (Winner, Cycle 10), Maciej Skiba (Cycle 11), Nicole Akonchong (Cycle 10), Arek Pydych (Cycle 10), Natalia Woś (Cycle 11), Michael Zieliński & Tala Dołgowska
157	10	"Episode 10"	4 November 2023
Challenge winner: Amelia Wnęk, Domink Szymański, Filip Krogulski & Sofia Konecka-Menescal; First call-out: Amelia Wnęk; Bottom three: Aleks Szynkariow, Marta Szatańska & Tadeusz Mikołajczak; Eliminated: Marta Szatańska & Tadeusz Mikołajczak; Featured photographer: Marcin Tyszka; Guest judges: Karla Gruszecka & Maja Zimnoch; Special guests: Danil Vitkowski, Dominka Lubawa, Daniela Firmana, Karolina Malinowska & Macieja "Magic Mars" Marsa
158	11	"Episode 11"	11 November 2023
Challenge winner: Aleks Szynkariow, Amelia Wnęk & Sofia Konecka-Menescal; First call-out: Dominik Szymański; Bottom three: Aleks Szynkariow, Amelia Wnęk & Filip Krogulski; Eliminated: Filip Krogulski; Featured photographer: Celine May; Guest judges: Janka Polliani; Special guests: Genevieve Sztuk & Louise Mørck Mikkelsen
159	12	"Episode 12"	18 November 2023
Challenge winner: First call-out: Sofia Konecka-Menescal; Bottom three: Aleks Szynkariow, Amelia Wnęk & Natalia Węgrzynowska; Eliminated: Aleks Szynkariow & Amelia Wnęk; Featured photographer: Marcin Tyszka; Guest judges: Birgitte Herskind; Special guests: Henrik Vibskov, Soeren Le Schmidt, & Gestuz
160	13	"Episode 13"	25 November 2023
Final four: Dominik Szymański, Natalia Węgrzynowska, Sofia Konecka-Menescal & Wiktoria Darda; First Bottom two: Natalia Węgrzynowska & Wiktoria Darda; Eliminated: Natalia Węgrzynowska; Second Bottom two: Sofia Konecka-Menescal & Wiktoria Darda; Eliminated: Wiktoria Darda; Final two: Dominik Szymański & Sofia Konecka-Menescal; Runner-up: Sofia Konecka-Menescal; Poland’s Next Top Model: Dominik Szymański; Featured photographer: Kamil Kotarba; Guest judges: Gosia Baczyńska; Special guests: Julia Rocka, Natalia Nykiel, Sorry Boys

== Results ==
Order	Episodes												
Order	3 (Note: Episodes 2 and 3 were casting episodes. In episode 3, the pool of semi-finalists was reduced to the final 14 models who moved on to the main competition.)	4 (Note: Tadeusz had been granted a 'Golden Ticket' during the show's auditions, and was therefore automatically granted a spot in the final cast.)	5	6 (Note: In episode 6, Aleks was originally eliminated, but mentor Michał Piróg, who'd been granted the opportunity of bringing one eliminated contestant back into the competition, decided to save him.)	7 (Note: In episode 7, Sofia was granted immunity as a prize for winning the second challenge.)	8	9	10	11	12	13		
1	Amelia	Aleks; Natalia	Dominik; Róża	Natalia	Wiktoria D.	Sofia	Wiktoria D.	Amelia	Dominik	Sofia	Sofia	Dominik	Dominik
2	Dominik	Aleks; Natalia	Dominik; Róża	Wiktoria D.	Sofia	Natalia	Sofia	Dominik	Wiktoria D.	Dominik	Dominik	Sofia	Sofia
3	Zoja	Tadeusz	Amelia; Natalia	Amelia	Dominik	Dominik	Natalia	Natalia	Natalia	Wiktoria D.	Wiktoria D.	Wiktoria D.	
4	Róża	Filip	Amelia; Natalia	Sofia	Natalia	Amelia	Filip	Wiktoria D.	Sofia	Natalia	Natalia		
5	Filip	Amelia	Tadeusz; Wiktoria B.	Marta	Aleks	Tadeusz	Amelia	Filip	Aleks	Aleks; Amelia			
6	Sofia	Sofia	Tadeusz; Wiktoria B.	Dominik	Amelia	Aleks	Dominik	Sofia	Amelia	Aleks; Amelia			
7	Wiktoria D.	Dominik	Aleks; Marta	Wiktoria B.	Filip	Marta	Aleks	Aleks	Filip				
8	Noemi	Mateusz	Aleks; Marta	Róża	Marta	Filip	Tadeusz	Marta; Tadeusz					
9	Wiktoria B.	Wiktoria B.	Filip; Sofia	Tadeusz	Tadeusz	Wiktoria D.	Marta	Marta; Tadeusz					
10	Natalia	Róża	Filip; Sofia	Mateusz	Róża	Róża	Róża						
11	Mateusz	Oliwier	Wiktoria D.	Filip	Wiktoria B.	Wiktoria B.							
12	Oliwier	Wiktoria D.	Mateusz	Aleks	Mateusz								
13	Aleks	Noemi	Noemi; Oliwier										
14	Marta	Marta	Noemi; Oliwier										
15		Zoja											

The contestant was eliminated.
The contestant was originally eliminated but was saved.
The contestant was immune from elimination.
The contestant won the competition.

=== Photo shoots ===
- Episode 3 photo shoot: Polaroids (semifinals)
- Episode 4 photo shoot: Hanging mid-air in the center of Warsaw
- Episode 5 video shoot: Fashion film by Ralph Kamiński
- Episode 6 photo shoot: Artistic naked
- Episode 7 photo shoot: Marie Claire magazine
- Episode 8 photo shoot: Posing with families in Wonderland
- Episode 9 video shoot: Sports fashion film
- Episode 10 photo shoot: Daniel Firman's sculptures
- Episode 11 photo shoot: Posing in Odense
- Episode 12 photo shoot: Posing in Gisselfeld Castle Gardens
