= Top Model. Zostań modelką season 3 =

Top Model. Zostań modelką
- Season 3
- No. of episodes: 14

Release
- Original network: TVN
- Original release: 6 March – 5 June 2013

Season chronology
- ← Previous; Cycle 2 Next → Cycle 4

The third season of Top Model. Zostań modelką premiered on 6 March 2013. It was the third cycle of the Polish adaptation of Tyra Banks’ America’s Next Top Model, in which contestants from Poland compete in various challenges to win the title of the next Polish Top Model. The prizes included a modeling contract with NEXT Model Management, a cover appearance in the Polish edition of Glamour, and a nationwide Always Discreet campaign, providing a platform for a successful modeling career. The competition was once again hosted by Polish-born model Joanna Krupa, who served as lead judge alongside fashion designer Dawid Woliński, fashion show director Kasia Sokołowska, and photographer Marcin Tyszka.

The international destinations for this cycle were Mumbai and Funchal. The winner was 20-year-old Zuza Kołodziejczyk from Poznań.

== Auditions ==
Auditions for season three took place in May, June and July 2012 in four Polish cities: Poznań, Rzeszów, Białystok and Warsaw.

City	Venue	Audition
Poznań	Szkoła Baletowa	19 May 2012
Rzeszów	Millenium Hall	26 May 2012
Białystok	Pałac Branickich	3 June 2012
Warsaw	—N/a	2 December 2012

== Cast ==
=== Contestants ===
(Ages stated are at start of contest)

Contestant	Age	Height	Hometown	Finish	Place
Ksenia Chlebicka	19	1.74 m (5 ft 8 1/2 in)	Zielonka	Episode 5	14
Aleksandra 'Ola' Antas	18	1.72 m (5 ft 7 1/2 in)	Jasło	Episode 6	13
Anna 'Ania' Piechowiak	22	1.73 m (5 ft 8 in)	Poznań	Episode 7	12
Anna 'Ania' Koryto	18	1.70 m (5 ft 7 in)	Dydnia	Episode 8	11
Marta Zimlińska	19	1.77 m (5 ft 9 1/2 in)	Poznań	Episode 9	10
Aleksandra 'Ola' Krysiak	18	1.76 m (5 ft 9 1/2 in)	Płońsk	Episode 10	9
Joanna 'Asia' Zaremska	21	1.76 m (5 ft 9 1/2 in)	Stargard	Episode 10	8
Anna 'Ania' Cybulska	17	1.82 m (5 ft 11 1/2 in)	Grodzisk	Episode 11	7
Justyna Pawlicka	20	1.74 m (5 ft 8 1/2 in)	Leszno	Episode 12	6
Tamara Subbotko	18	1.75 m (5 ft 9 in)	Gdynia	Episode 13	5
Renata Kurczab	20	1.80 m (5 ft 11 in)	Katowice	Episode 14	4
Klaudia Strzyżewska	21	1.80 m (5 ft 11 in)	Sosnowiec	Episode 14	3
Marcela Leszczak	21	1.72 m (5 ft 7 1/2 in)	Konin	Episode 14	2
Zuzanna 'Zuza' Kołodziejczyk	20	1.73 m (5 ft 8 in)	Poznań	Episode 14	1

=== Judges ===
- Joanna Krupa – Host and head judge
- Dawid Woliński – Designer
- Katarzyna Sokołowska – Fashion director
- Marcin Tyszka – Photographer

=== Other cast members ===
- Michał Piróg – Mentor

== Episodes ==
No. overall	No. in season	Title	Original release date
1	28	"Episode 1"	6 March 2013
First casting episode. The judges scout model hopefuls to take part in the competition.
2	29	"Episode 2"	13 March 2013
Second casting episode. The search continues as the spots in the semi-finals begin to dwindle.
3	30	"Episode 3"	20 March 2013
Third casting episode. The wannabe models secure their place in the semi-finals, and take part in a glamorous runway show show at the historic Czocha Castle.
4	31	"Episode 4"	27 March 2013
The final stage of castings takes place, along with a photo shoot. The girls are divided into five groups and each team is assigned a brief to follow. It's every model for herself as the final fourteen contestants are selected to move into the model house.
5	32	"Episode 5"	3 April 2013
The contestants moved into the model home and competed in a catwalk challenge, which Tamara won, choosing Marcela to share the top room. They then received makeovers before a photo shoot in pairs under extreme weather. At panel, Ola A, Ania C, Ania P, Asia, Klaudia, Marcela, and Tamara earned immunity, with Asia receiving first call-out. Ania K, Ksenia, and Marta landed in the bottom three. Ania was saved, leaving Ksenia and Marta at risk. Despite Joanna Krupa wanting to save Ksenia, the judges disagreed, and Ksenia was eliminated.: Featured photographer: Robert Wolanski
6	33	"Episode 6"	10 April 2013
The models received runway coaching from Kasia Sokołowska and Zuza Bijoch, with Ola K winning the lesson for her strong walk. Tensions rose at the house as some contestants clashed with Asia. They then faced their first fashion show on a catwalk suspended several stories above the ground. While many struggled, Ania C and Marcela impressed, and Renata refused to walk due to her fear of heights. Ania C won the challenge. For the photo shoot, the contestants staged dives as rock stars into a crowd of fans. At panel, Zuza earned best photo, and Ola A, Ania C, and Renata landed in the bottom three. Ania C was saved, Renata narrowly survived after being questioned, and Ola A was eliminated for failing to reach her potential.: Featured photographer: Emil Bilinski; Special guests: Zuza Bijoch, Ewelina Lisowska
7	34	"Episode 7"	17 April 2013
The twelve remaining models met Witold Szmańda for a health training session, where Ania P became emotional after her waist was measured and refused to participate, feeling singled out as the only plus-size model. Klaudia performed best and won the challenge. Later, they took an acting lesson with Daria Widawska, during which Ania P and Ola clashed in a screaming exercise, and Ania P again refused to participate. For the first photo shoot, the models split into three groups to create Glamour magazine covers, followed by a second shoot portraying vampires. All three covers were published. Ania K, Marcela, and Marta earned immunity, while Ania C landed in the bottom three. In the end, Ania P and Justyna were in the bottom two, and Ania P was eliminated for struggling to accept criticism.: Featured photographer: Marcin Kempski; Special guests: Witold Szmańda, Daria Widawska
8	35	"Episode 8"	24 April 2013
The models attended their first runway casting for the Spring/Summer Bohoboco collection, with Kasia Sokołowska as casting director, warning she would cut anyone who was unprepared. Justyna, Marta, and Ania K were excluded after the casting, followed by Zuza and Asia during fittings. The remaining contestants walked in the show, with Tamara and Renata impressing most. For the challenge, they filmed a poolside commercial for Gillette Venus & Olay with Julia Pietrucha; Zuza won for her natural performance. The next day, Adam Pluciński photographed them in three sessions: on the red carpet, with male models, and as romantic actresses. At panel, Renata earned first call-out and the runway challenge win. Ania K, Asia, and Marta landed in the bottom three, and Ania K was eliminated for declining performance.: Featured photographer & director: Adam Plucinski, Tadeusz Sliwa; Special guests: Kamil Owczarek, Michal Gilbert Lach, Julia Pietrucha
9	36	"Episode 9"	1 May 2013
Witold Szmańda visited the model house to teach a lesson on healthy eating. Later, the girls went to Lodz, a second-hand shop, where they met Michał Piróg and stylist Malwina Wędzikowska to create themed outfits — Minimal, Etno, Rock, Retro, and Military. Marcela won the challenge and received a dress from Michał’s latest collection. The next day, the contestants met Waris Dirie, who introduced a teamwork challenge creating photos representing global issues. Justyna, Marta, and Tamara won, while Marcela, Asia, and Ola were criticized for poor teamwork. For the photo shoot, the models posed semi-nude for editorials by Marcin Tyszka. Renata, Tamara, Marcela, Klaudia, and Justyna impressed, while Ola frustrated the photographer. At panel, Waris Dirie named Klaudia her favorite, and Renata earned best photo. Ola, Zuza, and Marta landed in the bottom three; Ola and Zuza were saved, and Marta was eliminated after her third appearance in the bottom two.: Featured photographer: Marcin Tyszka; Special guests: Witold Szmańda, Malwina Wędzikowska, Waris Dirie
10	37	"Episode 10"	8 May 2013
The episode opened with the models meeting Joanna Krupa and photographer Wojtek Wojtczak for an advertising shoot on a conveyor belt catwalk, where they had to project confidence. Most struggled, but Justyna impressed and won the challenge, receiving a Discreet dress and a feature in Glamour magazine. The next day, the girls attended a D’Vision casting with Anja Rubik and Lucyna Szymańska, who announced only eight contestants would remain. Marcela was criticized for being unprepared, Ola for her attitude, and Klaudia for lacking ambition. Klaudia and Marcela were saved, while Ola was eliminated. For the photo shoot, the contestants posed as couture ballerinas photographed by Ram Shergill, with Anja observing. Klaudia earned best photo, Justyna was commended for improvement, and Asia, Marcela, and Renata landed in the bottom three; Asia was eliminated.: Featured photographer: Ram Shergill; Special guests: Wojtek Wojtczak, Martyna Kostrzynska, Asia Winiarska, Anja Rubik, Lucyna Szymanska
11	38	"Episode 11"	15 May 2013
The episode opened with the models performing at a railway station, where passersby voted for their favorite. Justyna won the challenge and a D’Vision portfolio shoot, with runner-up Klaudia also participating. They then completed a dance challenge, also won by Justyna, earning private lessons and modern dance training from Michał Piróg. During the lesson, Zuza revealed her fear of seeing her reflection and left early. The next day, the models were surprised by a visit from their mothers for a heartfelt photo shoot, with Renata posing alongside her sister. At panel, Tamara earned best photo, while Ania, Klaudia, and Zuza landed in the bottom three. Ania was eliminated for showing little progress, and it was announced that the remaining six contestants would travel to India.: Featured photographer: Marlena Bielińska; Special guests: Asia Zwierzyńska, Michał Maciejewski, Kacper Matuszewski Smu
12	39	"Episode 12"	22 May 2013
The final six models arrived in Mumbai, India, for the rest of the competition. They learned to wear a sari, during which Renata claimed the others were jealous and refused to help Marcela. Tamara won the challenge for wearing her sari best. Next, the girls attended their first go-sees with four clients. Split into pairs, they faced multiple car breakdowns, including Klaudia and Zuza losing a wheel, but still reached all clients. Justyna and Zuza booked no jobs, Klaudia, Renata, and Tamara each booked one, and Marcela won with two. For the photo shoot at an Indian temple, Marcela earned first call-out, while Klaudia and Justyna fell into the bottom two. Klaudia was saved, and Justyna was eliminated.: Featured photographer: Suresh Natarajan; Special guests: Asmita Marwa, Narendra Kumar, Masaba, Shivan & Narresh
13	40	"Episode 13"	29 May 2013
The models took part in a yoga lesson to prepare for Lakme Fashion Week, where they were fitted for dresses and rehearsed their runway walks. Klaudia was dropped from the show and watched from backstage as the others walked. The next day, the girls explored Mumbai with Michał Piróg, practicing Bollywood-style dancing and posing for photos with locals. For the photo shoot, they modeled against natural and architectural backdrops for Harper’s Bazaar. Zuza impressed the photographer, Tamara struggled, Klaudia received praise during shooting, and Renata delivered a strong editorial image. At the final panel, Renata earned best photo, followed by Marcela and Zuza. Despite Klaudia’s disappointing final picture, her strong portfolio secured her a spot in the final four, and Tamara was eliminated.: Featured photographer: Vishal Kullarwal
14	41	"Episode 14"	5 June 2013
The finale opened by recapping how the contestants reached the top four, after which eliminations were determined by public SMS voting. Footage from their final Glamour shoot in Madeira was shown, with judges briefly commenting on the covers. Zuza and Marcela were declared safe first, while Renata was eliminated for receiving the fewest votes. The remaining three participated in a lingerie runway show with previously eliminated contestants, followed by a Samsung Galaxy commercial. Klaudia, appearing in the bottom two for the fifth time, was eliminated, leaving Marcela and Zuza for the final challenge. In the live shoot, inspired by the 1999 film American Beauty, they posed in lingerie on a bed of blue petals for a suspended photographer. A second runway show with Patricia Kazadi followed, and the judges shared their opinions: Kasia Sokołowska and Dawid Woliński praised both, Anja Rubik favored Zuza, and Marcin Tyszka admired Marcela. Zuza was revealed as the winner when her Glamour cover appeared on stage.: Featured photographer: Mateusz Stankiewicz; Special guests: Anja Rubik, Patricia Kazadi, Saif Mahdi

== Results ==
Order	Episodes												
Order	4 (Note: Episodes 1, 2, 3 and 4 were casting episodes. In episode 4, the pool of semi-finalists was reduced to the final 14 models who moved on to the main competition.)	5 (Note: In episode 5, the best-performing contestant from each photo shoot pair won immunity from elimination at panel. Asia won best photo overall, the rest of the call out for the immune contestants was not shown, possibly due to a continuity error.)	6	7 (Note: In episode 7, Ania K., Marcela and Marta gained immunity from elimination at panel.)	8	9	10 (Note: In episode 10, Anja Rubik deemed Ola K., Klaudia, and Marcela to be the least impressive models during the casting. Anja chose to eliminate Ola K.)	11 (Note: In episode 11, Joanna called Ania C., Klaudia, and Zuza forward as the bottom three. She first announced that Ania C. was eliminated, then handed Klaudia and Zuza their photos whilst in the bottom two.)	12	13	14		
1	Ania P.	Asia	Zuza	Ania K.	Renata	Renata	Klaudia	Tamara	Marcela	Renata	Zuza	Zuza	Zuza
2	Ania C.	Ania C. Ania P. Klaudia; Ola A. Tamara; Marcela	Ania P.	Marcela	Tamara	Tamara	Justyna	Renata	Zuza	Marcela	Marcela	Marcela	Marcela
3	Ola K.	Ania C. Ania P. Klaudia; Ola A. Tamara; Marcela	Marcela	Marta	Ola K.	Marcela	Zuza	Marcela	Renata	Zuza	Klaudia	Klaudia	
4	Marcela	Ania C. Ania P. Klaudia; Ola A. Tamara; Marcela	Ola K.	Asia	Justyna	Klaudia	Tamara	Justyna	Tamara	Klaudia	Renata		
5	Asia	Ania C. Ania P. Klaudia; Ola A. Tamara; Marcela	Ania K.	Ola K.	Marcela	Justyna	Ania C.	Ania C.	Klaudia	Tamara			
6	Zuza	Ania C. Ania P. Klaudia; Ola A. Tamara; Marcela	Marta	Zuza	Klaudia	Ania C.	Marcela	Klaudia; Zuza	Justyna				
7	Ksenia	Ania C. Ania P. Klaudia; Ola A. Tamara; Marcela	Tamara	Tamara	Ania C.	Asia	Renata	Klaudia; Zuza					
8	Ania K.	Renata	Justyna	Renata	Zuza	Ola K.	Asia						
9	Tamara	Ola K.	Klaudia	Klaudia	Asia	Zuza	Ola K.						
10	Ola A.	Justyna	Asia	Ania C.	Marta	Marta							
11	Justyna	Zuza	Ania C.	Justyna	Ania K.								
12	Renata	Ania K.	Renata	Ania P.									
13	Klaudia; Marta	Marta	Ola A.										
14	Klaudia; Marta	Ksenia											

The contestant was immune from elimination
The contestant was eliminated
The contestant was eliminated outside of judging panel
The contestant was part of a non-elimination bottom two.
The contestant won the competition
