= Top Model (Polish TV series) season 14 =

Top Model
- Season 14
- No. of episodes: 12

Release
- Original network: TVN
- Original release: September 3 – November 19, 2025

Season chronology
- ← Previous; Season 13

Top Model, cycle 14 is the fourteenth cycle of an ongoing reality television series based on Tyra Banks' America's Next Top Model that pits contestants from Poland against each other in a variety of competitions to determine who will win the title of the next Polish Top Model.

Joanna Krupa, who also serves as the lead judge, reprised her role as host for the fourteenth season. Other judges included fashion designer Dawid Woliński, fashion show director Kasia Sokołowska and photographer Marcin Tyszka. This is the eleventh season of the show to feature male contestants.

Among the prizes for the season are a contract with Selective Management, an appearance on the cover of the Polish issue of Glamour, and 200,000 złotys (US$45,000). The winner of the competition was 37-year-old Michał Kot from Szczecin. He is the first winner, who at the time of the show was over 30 years old and he's the first winner, who was saved from elimination by Michał Piróg.

This is the first cycle since Cycle 8 where no Golden Ticket was awarded. This is also the last cycle featuring Michał Piróg as the mentor.

The international destinations this cycle were Dublin, Lough Tay and Salalah.

== Cast ==
=== Contestants ===
Discussion ongoing...
(Ages stated are at start of contest)

Contestant	Age	Hometown	Finish	Place
Oliwier Przybylski	21	Wrocław	Episode 4	14
Robert Kaznowski	25	Zgorzelec	Episode 5	13
Oksana Metelna	21	Kyiv, Ukraine	Episode 6	12
Sara Anwar	21	Kraków	Episode 7	11
Daniel Wieczorek	30	Żywiec	Episode 8	10
Krzysztof 'Krzysiek' Lib	20	Warsaw	Episode 9	9-8
Magdalena 'Madzia' Czyżewska	21	Gdynia	Episode 9	9-8
Joanna 'Asia' Madejska	19	Stockholm, Sweden	Episode 11	7-5
Monika Antosz	26	Oslo, Norway	Episode 11	7-5
Yaritza Reyes-Zmysłowska	31	Santo Domingo, Dominican Republic	Episode 11	7-5
Ewa 'Eva' Pietruk	46	London, United Kingdom	Episode 12	4
Emilia Weltrowska	20	Michałowice	Episode 12	3
Mateusz Król	20	Sosnowiec	Episode 12	2
Michał Kot	37	Szczecin	Episode 12	1

=== Judges ===
- Joanna Krupa – Host and head judge
- Dawid Woliński – Designer
- Katarzyna Sokołowska – Fashion director
- Marcin Tyszka – Photographer

=== Other cast members ===
- Michał Piróg – Mentor

== Episodes ==
No. overall	No. in season	Title	Original release date
173	1	"Episode 1"	3 September 2025
Auditions for the thirteenth season of Top Model begin, and aspiring hopefuls are chosen for the next round.
174	2	"Episode 2"	10 September 2025
In the round of auditions, the judges choose the next select few to continue on to the next round.
175	3	"Episode 3"	17 September 2025
Like last season, instead of the usual bootcamp episode, the top 20 contestants were selected to move into the Top Model house where they meet for the first time. There was no Golden Ticket winner, a first time since its introduction in cycle 8. Therefore, an additional challenge was organized to select the first resident of the Winner's Room (which was usually awarded to the winner of the Golden Ticket). After the series of challenges, which included a photo shoot, casting, and fashion show, the judges selected fourteen contestants who made up the final cast of cycle 14.: Challenge winner: Michał Kot; Eliminated outside of judging: Julia Szymulewska; Best performance: Monika Antosz; Eliminated: Maciej Pupin, Magda Ochman, Marta Grabowska, Przemek Migoń, Rayan Hussain; Featured photographer: Marcin Tyszka; Guest judge: Jannick Lyneborg-Lindberg; Special guests: Maciej Skiba, Jan Kryszczak, Paweł Odoszewski, Beniamin Przeradowski, Maciej Rejmentowski
176	4	"Episode 4"	24 September 2025
Fourteen participants underwent makeovers. They then took part in pairs in the recording of fashion films about the highs and lows of the fashion industry over the decades.: First call-out: Madzia Czyżewska & Michał Kot; Bottom three: Krzysiek Lib, Monika Antosz & Oliwier Przybylski; Eliminated: Oliwier Przybylski; Featured photographer: Marcin Tyszka; Featured director: Renata Gabryjelska; Guest judge: Renata Gabryjelska; Special guests: Klaudia Zioberczyk, Tomek Górecki, Wojtek Wieteska
177	5	"Episode 5"	1 October 2025
Booked for a job : Daniel Wieczorek & Monika Antosz (Balamonte), Sara Anwar & Yaritza Reyes-Zmysłowska (Simona Nikołasjewska), Asia Madejska & Monika Antosz (PRM London), Mateusz Król & Yaritza Reyes-Zmysłowska (tołpa); First call-out: Asia Madejska; Bottom three: Krzysiek Lib, Robert Kaznowski & Sara Anwar; Eliminated: Robert Kaznowski; Featured photographer: Bartek Szmigulski; Guest judge: Bogna Sworowska; Special guests: Dominika Wysocka, John Bruce, Paulo Ribeiro, Mateusz Rogenbuk, Olena Kets, Grzegorz Krychowiak, Damian Kozłowski, Simona Nikołasjewska, Sylwia Butor, Sebastian Kozon, Iwona Czopek
178	6	"Episode 6"	8 October 2025
Challenge winner/Immune : Emilia Weltrowska; Booked for a job : Yaritza Reyes-Zmysłowska; First call-out: Mateusz Król; Bottom three: Daniel Wieczorek, Krzysiek Lib & Oksana Metelna; Eliminated: Oksana Metelna; Featured photographer: Wojtek Rudzki (challenge), Zuza Krajewska (photoshoot); Guest judge: Bartosz Gelner; Special guests: Żaklina Ta Dinh, Kuba Walica, Sobel, Magdalena Boczarska
179	7	"Episode 7"	15 October 2025
Challenge winner/Immune : Emilia Weltrowska; Booked for a job : Monika Antosz, Eva Pietruk; First call-out: Madzia Czyżewska; Bottom three: Daniel Wieczorek, Emilia Weltrowska & Sara Anwar; Eliminated: Sara Anwar; Featured photographer: Maciej Tyszka; Guest judge: Karolina Pisarek-Salla, Weronika Rosati; Special guests: Natalia Węgrzynowska, Tymoteusz Zimny
180	8	"Episode 8"	22 October 2025
Booked for a job : Monika Antosz (campain); Yaritza Reyes-Zmysłowska, Monika Antosz, Michał Kot & Krzysztof Lib (Mariusz Przybylski's fashion show); First call-out: Yaritza Reyes-Zmysłowska; Bottom three: Daniel Wieczorek, Eva Pietruk & Madzia Czyżewska; Eliminated: Daniel Wieczorek; Featured director: Mac Adamczak; Guest judge: Katarzyna Dąbrowska, Michał Danilczuk; Special guests: Joanna Koroniewska, Maciej Edelman, Anna Adaus, Wiktori Sienkiewicz, Adam Kaszewski, Mariusz Przybylski, Michał Danilczuk, Tomek Prządka
181	9	"Episode 9"	29 October 2025
Booked for a job : Emilia Weltrowska (beauty campain); Krzysztof Lib, Michał Kot & Yaritza Reyes-Zmysłowska (Ministry of Health's social campaign); First call-out: Monika Antosz; Bottom three: Eva Pietruk, Krzysztof Lib & Madzia Czyżewska; Eliminated: Krzysztof Lib & Madzia Czyżewska; Featured photographer: Maciej Tyszka; Guest judge: Katarzyna Dąbrowska, Michał Danilczuk; Special guests: Magda Pieczonka, Paulina Frankowska, Wiktoria Frankowska, Magdalena Fraj, Sandra Escriña, Dawid Ogrodnik, Osi Ugonoh
182	10	"Episode 10"	5 November 2025
The first part of the semi-final. The top seven went to Fashion Week in Dublin. They took part in six castings for shows. As there was no photo shoot in this episode, the judges on the panel evaluated their efforts so far at Fashion Week and throughout the program.: Booked for a job : Michał Kot (Bold Golf, Irish Roots), Mateusz Król (Bold Golf, Irish Roots, ~~Rashhiiid~~), Monika Antosz (Irish Sea, Irish Roots, Sasha Donnellan), Yaritza Reyes-Zmysłowska (Bold Golf, Aoife, Irish Sea, Irish Roots, Rashhiiid), Asia Madejska (Bold Golf, Aoife, Irish Sea, Rashhiiid), Emilia Weltrowska (Aoife, Irish Sea, Sasha Donnellan), Eva Pietruk (Irish Roots, Rashhiiid); Challenge winner: Michał Kot; First call-out: Asia Madejska; Bottom three: Eva Pietruk, Michał Kot & Monika Antosz; Saved from elimination: Michał Kot; Guest judge: Anne O'Shea; Special guests: Thalia Heffernan, David Allen, Rachel Maguire, Aoife McNamara, Siobhan Whelan, Sasha Donellan, Jesse Coivet
183	11	"Episode 11"	12 November 2025
The second part of the semi-final. The contestants participated in the rest of the fashion shows and five female contestants were also invited for a casting at Paul Costelloe fashion show. The contestnts also participated in a photo shoot at Wicklow National Park.: Booked for a job : Monika Antosz, Yaritza Reyes-Zmysłowska & Emilia Weltrowska (Paul Costelloe); First call-out: Emilia Weltrowska; Bottom four: Asia Madejska, Mateusz Król, Monika Antosz & Yaritza Reyes-Zmysłowska; Eliminated: Asia Madejska, Monika Antosz & Yaritza Reyes-Zmysłowska; Featured photographer: Bryce McCall; Guest judge: Ashley McDonnell; Special guests:
184	12	"Episode 12"	19 November 2025
The final four will compete for the title of Poland's Next Top Model.: Final four: Emilia Weltrowska, Eva Pietruk, Mateusz Król & Michał Kot; Eliminated: Eva Pietruk; Final three: Emilia Weltrowska, Mateusz Król & Michał Kot; Eliminated: Emilia Weltrowska; Final two: Mateusz Król & Michał Kot; Runner-up: Mateusz Król; Poland's Next Top Model: Michał Kot; Featured photographer: Special guests:

== Results ==
Discussion ongoing...

Order	Episodes											
Order	3 (Note: Episodes 1 and 2 were audition episodes. In episode 3, all 20 contestants selected from the auditions entered the model house. Julia was eliminated outside of judging panel after a photo shoot. At the end of the episode, the judges eliminated Maciej, Magda, Marta, Rayan, and Przemek.)	4 (Note: In episode 4, Asia, Daniel, Emilia, Madzia, Michał, Sara, Yaritza were immune from elimination. At panel, Madzia and Michał were chosen as the best overall pair.)	5	6 (Note: In episode 6, Emilia was granted immunity from elimination after winning the runway challenge.)	7	8	9 (Note: In episode 9, Eva, Krzysiek, and Madzia landed in the bottom three. Joanna handed the last photograph to Eva, eliminating Krzysiek and Madzia.)	10 (Note: In episode 10, Michał was eliminated when he landed in the bottom two with Eva, but was saved by model mentor Michał Piróg.)	11 (Note: In episode 11, Asia, Mateusz, Monika, and Yaritza landed in the bottom four. Joanna Krupa handed the last photo to Mateusz, eliminating the remaining three contestants.)	12		
1	Yaritza	Madzia; Michał	Asia	Mateusz	Madzia	Yaritza	Monika	Asia	Emilia	Emilia	Mateusz	Michał
2	Mateusz	Madzia; Michał	Emilia	Michał	Yaritza	Asia	Mateusz	Yaritza	Michał	Michał	Michał	Mateusz
3	Emilia	Emilia	Madzia	Emilia	Krzysiek	Monika	Asia	Mateusz	Eva	Mateusz	Emilia	
4	Eva	Yaritza	Mateusz	Yaritza	Mateusz	Krzysiek	Emilia	Emilia	Mateusz	Eva		
5	Madzia	Sara	Monika	Monika	Michał	Emilia	Yaritza	Monika	Asia; Monika; Yaritza			
6	Michał	Daniel	Daniel	Sara	Asia	Mateusz	Michał	Eva	Asia; Monika; Yaritza			
7	Krzysiek	Asia	Michał	Madzia	Eva	Michał	Eva	Michał	Asia; Monika; Yaritza			
8	Robert	Oksana	Eva	Asia	Monika	Madzia	Krzysiek; Madzia					
9	Monika	Eva	Yaritza	Eva	Emilia	Eva	Krzysiek; Madzia					
10	Daniel	Mateusz	Oksana	Krzysiek	Daniel	Daniel						
11	Oksana	Robert	Sara	Daniel	Sara							
12	Oliwier	Monika	Krzysiek	Oksana								
13	Sara	Krzysiek	Robert									
14	Asia	Oliwier										

The contestant was eliminated.
The contestant was immune from elimination.
The contestant was originally eliminated but was saved.
The contestant won the competition.

=== Photo shoots ===
- Episode 3 photo shoot: Test shots by Marcin Tyszka
- Episode 4 video shoot: Highs and lows of the fashion industry
- Episode 5 photo shoot: Naked session in pairs
- Episode 6 photo shoot: Castle core wearing armor and chainmail
- Episode 7 photo shoot: Posing on a suspended ball
- Episode 8 video shoot: Futuristic dance video
- Episode 9 photo shoot: Marie Claire España editorial
- Episode 11 photo shoot: Editorial at Lough Tay
- Episode 12 photo shoots: Glamour magazine covers, vintage fashion
