= Top Model (Polish TV series) season 13 =

Top Model
- Season 13
- No. of episodes: 12

Release
- Original network: TVN
- Original release: September 4 – November 20, 2024

Season chronology
- ← Previous; Season 12 Next → Season 14

Top Model, cycle 13 is the thirteenth cycle of an ongoing reality television series based on Tyra Banks' America's Next Top Model that pits contestants from Poland against each other in a variety of competitions to determine who will win the title of the next Polish Top Model.

Joanna Krupa, who also serves as the lead judge, reprised her role as host for the twelfth season. Other judges included fashion designer Dawid Woliński, fashion show director Kasia Sokołowska and photographer Marcin Tyszka. This is the tenth season of the show to feature male contestants.

Among the prizes for the season are a contract with Selective Management, an appearance on the cover of the Polish issue of Glamour, and 200,000 złotys (US$45,000). The winner of the competition was 23-year-old Klaudia Zioberczyk from Katowice.

This is the first cycle that didn't feature a boot-camp episode. Instead, twenty contestants were invited to the Top Model house and competed in a runway and photo shoot, which ended in selecting the final fourteen contestants.

The international destination this cycle was Paris, Lisbon and Málaga.

== Contestants ==
(Ages stated are at start of contest)

Contestant	Age	Hometown	Finish	Place
Sara Stankiewicz	20	Skarbimierz-Osiedle	Episode 4	14
Maria 'Masha' Misevich	23	Minsk, Belarus	Episode 6	13 (quit)
Mateusz Nowak	23	Rybnik	Episode 6	12
Aleksandra 'Ola' Zyśk	23	Warsaw	Episode 7	11
Filip Blecharczyk	18	Sławków	Episode 8	10
Tymoteusz 'Tymek' Zimny	26	Biezdrowo	Episode 9	9
Julia Knach	21	Świebodzice	Episode 10	8-7
Grzegorz Gastman	20	Warsaw	Episode 10	8-7
Piotr Gabor-Koprowski	20	Kraków	Episode 11	6-5
Maja Słodzińska	17	Szczecin	Episode 11	6-5
Karolina Sobótka	21	Iłów	Episode 12	4
Adrianna 'Ada' Podsiadała	19	Siedlce	Episode 12	3
Hubert Włodarczak	21	Poznań	Episode 12	2
Klaudia Zioberczyk	23	Katowice	Episode 12	1

=== Judges ===
- Joanna Krupa – Host and head judge
- Dawid Woliński – Designer
- Katarzyna Sokołowska – Fashion director
- Marcin Tyszka – Photographer

=== Other cast members ===
- Michał Piróg – Mentor
- Sofia Konecka-Menescal – Mentor

== Episodes ==
No. overall	No. in season	Title	Original release date
161	1	"Episode 1"	4 September 2024
Auditions for the thirteenth season of Top Model begin, and aspiring hopefuls are chosen for the next round.
162	2	"Episode 2"	11 September 2024
In the round of auditions, the judges choose the next select few to continue on to the next round.: Golden ticket winner: Julia Knach
163	3	"Episode 3"	18 September 2024
Instead of the usual bootcamp episode, this time 20 contestants and were selected to move into the Top Model house. After briefly meeting for the first time, they are tasked to walk in their first fashion show. A shocking first elimination occurs directly after this.: Eliminated outside of judging: Filip Jędrachowicz & Mateusz Mamak; The remaining 18 contestants are thrown in front of the camera in their first shoot in pairs. An elimination will take place next episode where 4 more will go home.: Featured photographer: Marcin Tyszka; Guest judge: John Bruce; Special guests: Inez Wicher
164	4	"Episode 4"	25 September 2024
At the beginning of the episode, the models are put through their first elimination. 4 models are eliminated.: First call-out: Klaudia Zioberczyk; Bottom five: Benhur Isiksal, Emilia Strojny, Karolina Sobótka, Margo Przybysz & Martyna Dworak; Eliminated: Benhur Isiksal, Emilia Strojny, Margo Przybysz & Martyna Dworak; Guest judge: John Bruce; Following makeovers, the remaining 14 models shoot their first fashion video.: First call-out: Ada Podsiadała; Bottom two: Piotr Koprowski & Sara Stankiewicz; Eliminated: Sara Stankiewicz; Featured director: Adrian Chudek; Guest judge: Helena Englert; Special guests: Karolina Cuki Dziemieszkiewicz
165	5	"Episode 5"	2 October 2024
Booked for job: Ada Podsiadała, Klaudia Zioberczyk, Maja Słodzińska, Mateusz Nowak & Tymek Zimny; First call-out: Grzegorz Gastman; Bottom three: Filip Blecharczyk, Hubert Włodarczyk & Mateusz Nowak; Originally Eliminated: Filip Blecharczyk; Featured photographer: Maciej Nowak; Guest judge: Mery Spolsky; Special guests: Anna Lewandowska, Dominique Savri, Marta Łachacz, Mateusz Rogenbuk & Sylwia Butor
166	6	"Episode 6"	9 October 2024
Booked for job: Julia Knach, Piotr Koprowski, Ola Zyśk, Filip Blecharczyk, Maja Słodzińska, Ada Podsiadała; First call-out: Tymek Zimny; Bottom three: Masha Misevich, Mateusz Nowak & Ola Zyśk; Quit: Masha Misevich; Eliminated: Mateusz Nowak; Featured photographer: Bartek Szmigulski; Guest judges: Bartek Szmigulski & Klaudia El Dursi; Special guests: Twoja Stara, Aleksander Ryżow, Malwina Wędzikowska, Magdalena Warchoł
167	7	"Episode 7"	16 October 2024
Booked for job: Grzegorz Gastma & Klaudia Zioberczyk; First call-out: Ada Podsiadała; Bottom two: Hubert Włodarczak, Ola Zyśk & Tymek Zimny; Eliminated: Ola Zyśk; Featured photographer: Miłosz Rebeś; Featured director: Żabson; Guest judge: Żabson; Special guests: Arkadius, Michael Zielinski, Jan Kryszczak, Wiktoria Maciuk
168	8	"Episode 8"	23 October 2024
Booked for job: Karolina Sobótka, Klaudia Zioberczyk, Julia Knach & Grzegorz Gastman; First call-out: Piotr Koprowski; Bottom three: Filip Blecharczyk, Maja Słodzińska & Tymek Zimny; Eliminated: Filip Blecharczyk; Featured photographer: Rafał Makieła; Guest judge: Maja Zimnoch; Special guests: Osi Ugonoh, Dawid Woskanian, Dominika Wysocka, Dominik Szymański, Julia Sobczyńska, Maciej Skiba, Karolina Kaczyńska, Natalia Węgrzynowska, Adrian Nkwamu, Karolina Pisarek, Aleksander Ryżow, Agata Załęcka
169	9	"Episode 9"	30 October 2024
Booked for job: Maja Słodzińska, Grzegorz Gastman & Ada Podsiadała; First call-out: Hubert Włodarczak; Bottom three: Grzegorz Gastman, Klaudia Zioberczyk & Tymek Zimny; Eliminated: Tymek Zimny; Featured photographer: Adam Pluciński; Guest judge: Mikołaj Komar & Daga Ziober; Special guests: Brian Poniatowski, Sabina Jakubowicz & Ivan Bambalin
170	10	"Episode 10"	6 November 2024
This episode took place in Sopot. Participants worked together with prominent and inspiring figures from the worlds of fashion, sports, business, medicine, culture, during a fashion show and photo shoot performed by Alexi Lubomirski. All this was done to promote cancer prevention as part of the "Moda na badania (lit. Medical check-ups are in fashion)" campaign. Later, there was a session in glam rock aesthetics, and a panel of judges selected the best six to advance to Lisbon Fashion Week.: First call-out: Klaudia Zioberczyk; Bottom three: Grzegorz Gastman, Julia Knach & Piotr Koprowski; Eliminated: Grzegorz Gastman & Julia Knach; Featured photographers: Alexi Lubomirski, Maciej Tyszka; Guest judge: Alaina Vieru; Special Guests: eliminated contestants from Cycle 13 (Sara Stankiewicz, Masha Misevich, Mateusz Nowak, Ola Zyśk, Filip Blecharczyk, Tymek Zimny), Joanna Koroniewska, Maciej Dowbor, Bogna Sworowska, Monika Olejnik, Aleksandra Mirosław, Draginja Nadażdin, prof. Marzena Dębska, Sylwia Gregorczyk-Abram, Łukasz Orbitowski, Monika Hoffman-Piszora, Katarzyna Kozyra, Orina Krajewska, Jakub Józef Orliński, Natalia Bukowiecka, Grażyna Szapołowska, Marta Gardolińska, Magdalena Czażyńska-Jachim, Olga Leonowicz
171	11	"Episode 11"	13 November 2024
The six semifinalists flew to Lisbon for Moda Lisboa Fashion Week. Each participant took part in castings for fashion shows by Portuguese designers. After the Fashion Week, the contestants came back to Poland for a judging panel. For the first time in show's history, the judges only evaluated the results of the fashion week as there were no photo shoots.: Booked for fashion shows: Klaudia Zioberczyk (6 shows), Karolina Sobótka & Hubert Włodarczak (3 shows), Ada Podsiadała (2 shows), Maja Słodzińska & Piotr Koprowski (1 show); First call-out: Klaudia Zioberczyk; Bottom three: Ada Podsiadała, Maja Słodzińska & Piotr Koprowski; Eliminated: Maja Słodzińska & Piotr Koprowski; Guest judge: Luís Graça; Special guests: Valentim Quaresma, Diogo Mestre, Lidja Kolovrat, DuarteHajime, Luis Carvalho
172	12	"Episode 12"	20 November 2024
The final four will compete for the title of Poland's Next Top Model.: Final four: Ada Podsiadała, Hubert Włodarczak, Karolina Sobótka & Klaudia Zioberczyk; First Bottom two: Hubert Włodarczak & Karolina Sobótka; Eliminated: Karolina Sobótka; Second Bottom two: Ada Podsiadała & Hubert Włodarczak; Eliminated: Ada Podsiadała; Final two: Hubert Włodarczak & Klaudia Zioberczyk; Runner-up: Hubert Włodarczak; Poland's Next Top Model: Klaudia Zioberczyk; Featured photographer: Aldona Karczmarczyk, Marcin Tyszka; Special guests: Jakub Józef Orliński, Sara James, Nemo

== Results ==
Order	Episodes											
Order	4 (Note: Episodes 1 and 2 were audition episodes. In episode 3, all 20 contestants selected from the auditions entered the model house for the semifinals. At the end of the episode, the judges eliminated two contestants. At the beginning of episode 4, the judges selected the 14 contestants moved on to the main competition. The first official elimination also took place at the end of this episode.)		5 (Note: In episode 5, Filip B. was originally eliminated, but was saved by model mentor Michał Piróg.)	6 (Note: In Episode 6, Masha decided to quit the competition during panel.)	7	8	9	10	11 (Note: In episode 11, there was no photo or video shoot. The final results were based on the contestants' performance during Fashion Week and their progress during the entire cycle.)	12		
1	Klaudia	Ada	Grzegorz	Tymek	Ada	Piotr	Hubert	Klaudia	Klaudia	Klaudia	Hubert	Klaudia
2	Maja	Grzegorz	Klaudia	Klaudia	Karolina	Karolina	Julia	Hubert	Hubert	Ada	Klaudia	Hubert
3	Grzegorz	Maja	Julia	Hubert	Filip	Grzegorz	Karolina	Karolina	Karolina	Hubert	Ada	
4	Julia	Julia	Masha	Karolina	Maja	Julia	Piotr	Ada	Ada	Karolina		
5	Ola	Filip	Ada	Piotr	Piotr	Ada	Ada	Maja	Maja; Piotr			
6	Sara	Klaudia	Piotr	Filip	Grzegorz	Klaudia	Maja	Piotr	Maja; Piotr			
7	Mateusz	Hubert	Maja	Julia	Julia	Hubert	Klaudia	Grzegorz; Julia				
8	Filip	Tymek	Ola	Ada	Klaudia	Tymek	Grzegorz	Grzegorz; Julia				
9	Masha	Mateusz	Karolina	Grzegorz	Tymek	Maja	Tymek					
10	Hubert	Masha	Tymek	Maja	Hubert	Filip						
11	Piotr	Karolina	Hubert	Masha	Ola							
12	Tymek	Ola	Mateusz	Ola								
13	Ada	Piotr	Filip	Mateusz								
14	Karolina	Sara										

The contestant was eliminated.
The contestant was originally eliminated but was saved.
The contestant quit the competition
The contestant won the competition.

=== Photo shoots ===
- Episode 3 photo shoot: Camouflage in patterned outifts
- Episode 4 video shoot: Portraying mafia couples
- Episode 5 photo shoot: Nude in the forest
- Episode 6 photo shoot: Cowboys & cowgirls
- Episode 7 video shoot: Fashion decades of Hip Hop
- Episode 8 photo shoot: Underwater jellyfish
- Episode 9 photo shoot: Hanging on a pole at a shipping dock
- Episode 10 photo shoot: Glam rock in Sopot
- Episode 12 photo shoots: Glamour covers; blooming flowers
