= Jac Jagaciak =

Polish model

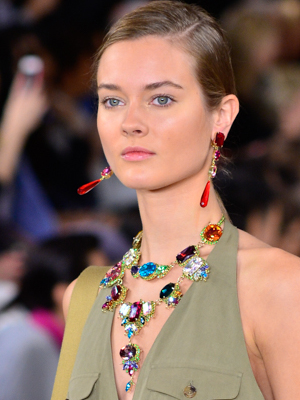
- Born: Monika Jagaciak; 15 January 1994 (age 32); Poznań, Poland
- Occupation: Model
- Years active: 2007–present
- Spouse: Branislav Jankic (m. 2017)
- Children: 1
- Modeling information
- Height: 5 ft 10 1/2 in (1.79 m)
- Hair color: Light brown
- Eye color: Green
- Agency: DNA Models (New York); D'Vision (Warsaw); Premier Model Management (London); Ford Models (Paris); METRO Models (Zurich)

Monika Jagaciak Jankic (Polish: [mɔˈɲika jaˈɡat͡ɕak]; born 15 January 1994), known professionally as Jac Jagaciak, is a Polish model. After signing with IMG Models in 2007, Jagaciak was given the nickname "Jac" by the agency.

== Early life ==
Monika Jagaciak Jankic was born in Poznań, Poland. Her mother worked as a physical education teacher, and her father as a jumping and sprinting coach. Her older sister, Anna Jagaciak-Michalska, is a retired professional Polish long jumper and triple jumper. At the age of four, Jagaciak began participating in track and field.

== Career ==
=== Early work and controversy (2007–08) ===
Jagaciak's modeling career began in 2007 after she was encouraged by her sister to attend an open casting of GAGA Models Agency at a shopping center in Poland. She was then picked up by IMG who signed her and in July 2007 she appeared on the cover of French Jalouse. Her big break came at age 13, when Jagaciak went on to land a Hermès campaign for the Fall/Winter 2007 season alongside Daria Werbowy, beating out 600 other candidates while still in primary school. Jagaciak stated in a later interview that before doing the campaign she had never heard of Hermes, nor had she heard of the photographer of the shoot Peter Lindbergh, "I think not knowing helped me stay relaxed" she said. Though Jagaciak's photos incensed some critics, who were upset at the idea of sexualizing girls at such a young age. Soon after, Jagaciak began traveling overseas for her career and in 2008 she traveled to Japan where she landed the cover of Elle. In May 2008, she appeared for the second time on the cover of French Jalouse, and in October 2008 Jagaciak also landed covers for Japanese Harper's Bazaar, and Japanese Spur. Jagaciak was set to appear on the cover of Australian Vogue when the editor decided she was wasn't old enough, and she had to sit out fashion shows due to age regulations.

Despite her success Jagaciak's young age and presence in the fashion industry caused huge controversy when, in 2008 at the age of 14, she was deemed inappropriate for Australian Fashion Week. After getting some criticisms about sexualization of young models in the fashion industry, organizers of Australian Fashion Week ruled that all children under 16 years old be banned from walking at the shows in Sydney. Jagaciak, who felt she was old enough, thought the decision was "stupid". The question was never asked of Gemma Ward, who was 15 when she made her Australian Fashion Week debut in May 2003 or of another Australian model, Tallulah Morton, who was 13 when she made her debut at the event two years later. Her mother, Marlena, said she accompanied her daughter on assignments and would never put her in danger. Jagaciak's mother believes her daughter has enough support to handle the tough industry but does not resent Australia's ban.

=== Breakthrough (2009–present) ===
After waiting for two years, at 15 years of age, in 2009, she debuted at New York Fashion Week, walking in a slew of shows, from Donna Karan to Calvin Klein Collection (which she opened and closed), becoming one of the most talked-about newcomers of the fall 2009 season. She became known for her powerful runway walk – even though she fell on the Hervé Léger runway, she went on to close both Shiatzy Chen, Marc Jacobs and Marni. She has gone on to walk in Milan too, walking for Prada, Dolce & Gabbana, Fendi, and Versace, but she didn't meet the age requirement to walk in the Paris Fashion Week. As of May 2009, she had been on 13 magazine covers. And became one of the "Top Ten Models to Watch" by New York Magazine. Designer Francisco Costa said of her when she became the face of Calvin Klein, "She possesses a timeless beauty that gives her the ability to be highly versatile, making her one of the most promising new models today."

For FW10 her advertising campaigns included Valentino, Alberta Ferretti, Chanel Beauty, Marc Jacobs, and Philosophy di Alberta Ferretti. However, her contract with Calvin Klein ended for the Fall/Winter 2010 season, and Jagaciak was subsequently replaced by Dutch model Lara Stone.When she was in the spring 2011 "New York Fashion Week's Top Ten Models" list at No. 7 opening for Tommy Hilfiger and closing shows for Derek Lam, Richard Chai LOVE.

In 2010, she signed an exclusive contract with Chanel and became the face of Chanel makeup, in a large number of campaigns, most of them photographed by Norwegian photographer Solve Sundsbo. She worked for Chanel until the early 2020s.

In 2015, she became a Victoria's Secret Angel. The next year she left the brand.

Jagaciak took a two-year hiatus to be educated at School of the Art Institute of Chicago.

== Personal life ==
Jagaciak and her family live in Mosina, a town surrounded by the Greater Poland National Park about 20 kilometres (12 mi) south of Poznań. In her spare time Jagaciak enjoys playing sports and drawing. Despite Jagaciak's busy career, she considers education very important.

In 2017, Jagaciak married Branislav Jankic, an American-Serbian artist. Jagaciak has a daughter, Mila, born in 2019.
