= Dawid Woliński =

Polish fashion designer (born 1977)

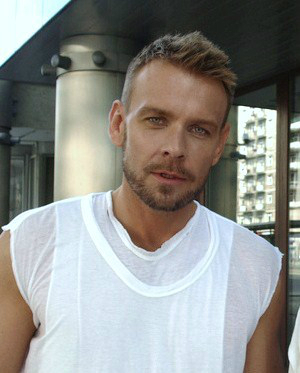
- Born: 12 March 1977 (age 48); Włocławek, Poland
- Education: Artistic
- Occupation: Fashion designer
- Website: http://www.dawidwolinski.com/

Dawid Woliński (born 1977 in Włocławek, Poland) is a Polish fashion designer. His clothes are worn by celebrities such as Paris Hilton, Nicole Richie, Dita von Teese, Michelle Rodriguez or Zuzanna Czerniej.

== Biography ==
Having approached fashion for the first time when still in high school, he went on to study at the Akademia Sztuk Pięknych im. Władysława Strzemińskiego in Łódź. Woliński designed his first collection in 2003. His second collection was presented at the Lisbon Fashion Week 2005. That collection was later featured on the covers of the German and Portugal Elle. In 2006 Dawid Woliński signed a contract with Tracey Ross and Maxfield in Los Angeles.

His last collection was presented in Warsaw on December 15, 2011.

He founded an online flower shop.

He has been a host on the Polish Top Model until 2011 where he once caused a stir when he checked, on stage and by himself, if a participant's breasts were real.

== Personal life ==
He has a daughter, Olivia, with his ex-partner Barbara.

== See also ==
- List of Poles
