= Aviapark =

- Авиапарк
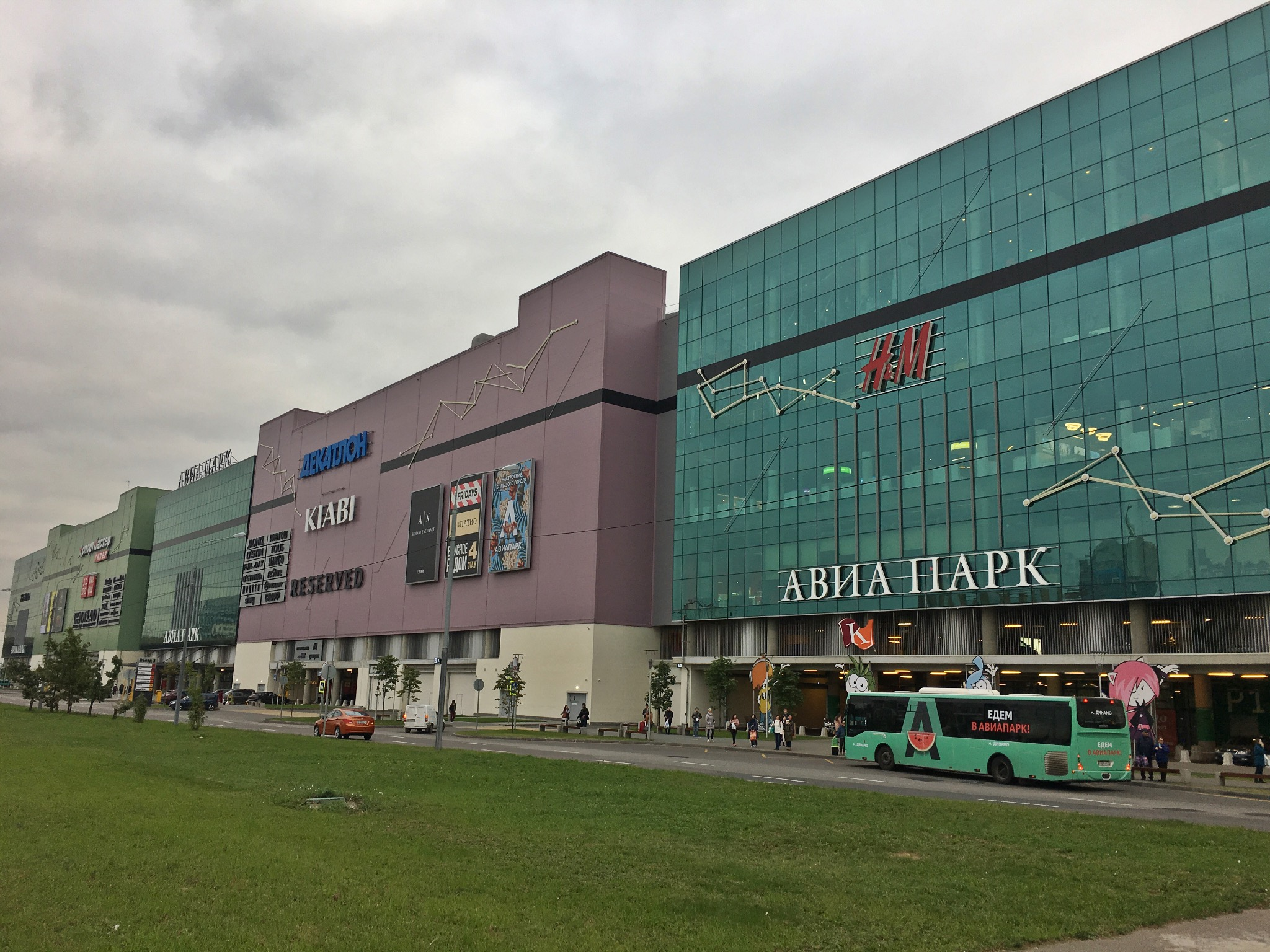

General information
- Type: Shopping mall
- Location: Khodynsky Bulvar 4, Moscow, Russia
- Coordinates: 55°46′24″N 37°31′52″E
- Opening: November 2014
- Owner: ZAO TVK Aviapark

Technical details
- Floor count: Six, including the parking levels
- Floor area: Total 390,000 m^{2} (4,200,000 sq ft); GLA 230,000 m^{2} (2,500,000 sq ft)

Design and construction
- Architects: Callison; Mehmet Sinan Ersoy

Other information
- Parking: 5,000 spaces (Two-level parking structure)

Website
- aviapark.com

Aviapark (Russian: Авиапарк) is a six-storey shopping centre in the Khoroshyovsky District of Moscow, Russia. With a total area of 390,000 square metres and 230,000 square metres of leasable space, it is one of the largest shopping malls in Europe. It opened in November 2014 with more than 500 shops and a four-story aquarium that extends to the ceiling of the retail section. The aquarium was recognised by Guinness World Records as the tallest cylindrical aquarium in the world at 22.31 metres (73.2 ft).The architectural design and project of the building were carried out by Callison and Turkish Architect Mehmet Sinan Ersoy. The design process took approximately 2 years. Construction of the building began in 2012, and it officially opened with a ceremony on November 14, 2014.

== Location ==
The property is in the Khoroshyovsky District of Moscow, on the grounds of the former Khodynka Aerodrome. There is direct access to the centre on the Moscow Metro: The distance between the metro station CSKA and the shopping centre can be covered in a few minutes on foot.

== Development and ownership ==
The property was developed by AMMA Development, which was founded by Mikhail Zaits. The only major shareholder is Mikhail Zaits.

In 2017, media reports suggested that Gazprombank was, at one point, involved in the mall's ownership. The bank initially provided a $560 million construction loan on the mall. Kommersant reported that, as part of a restructuring, Aviapark Mall Holdings received an option to buy the remaining stake from Gazprombank, which it exercised, removing the bank from the ownership structure.

It received its GPZU, or approved development plan, in June 2012 and began construction later that year. The opening was projected for the fourth quarter of 2014. Jones Lang LaSalle was named as the property's leasing agent.

== Major retailers ==
The mall's anchors include French retailer Auchan, the home improvement chain OBI, IKEA, Stockmann, Sephora, Zara, The Body Shop, Adidas, Nike, Pepco, Early Learning Centre, The North Face, Decathlon, Cropp, Geox, Samsung, Haier, McDonald's, Puma, ECCO, Zolla, Detskiy Mir, Gloria Jean's, KFC, Burger King, Lego, Sinsay, Xiaomi, O'Stin, Fixprice, Beeline, MTS, MegaFon, Eldorado, Leroy Merlin, MediaMarkt, M.video, Sportmaster, New Balance, Okay, Subway, TBOE, Sela, Hoff, Koton, Familia, Kari, Kotofey, Bork, Funday, Modi, Gap, Restore, Imaginarium, Chicco, Mothercare, Acoola, Hamleys, Mango, Reebok, Terranova, Fred Perry, Adidas Originals, Uniqlo, WorldClass, Galamart, Zenden, Lime, Levi's, Bershka, Oysho, New Yorker, Tom Tailor, Nathan's Famous, Baskin Robbins, TGi Fridays, GNC, Quicksilver Roxy Dcshoes, Vans, Falke, Soliver, Tommy Hilfiger, Michael Kors, Karl Lagerfield, Starbucks, Shake Shack, Clarks, Banana Republic, LG, Asus, Garmin, L'Etoile, Finn Flare, Triumph, Victoria's Secret, Krispy Kreme, Accessorize, Wrangler, Pimkie, Victoria's Secret Beauty & Accessories, Lee, Forever 21, Marks & Spencer, DNS, Next, Nike Sb, UnderArmour, Urban Outfitters, Converse, Dunkin' Donuts, Hollister, Furla, Nine West, Steve Madden, Superdry, House, Intimissimi, Lc Waikiki, Hermès, Balenciaga, BVLGARI, Valentino, Dr Martens, Fossil, DKNY, Diesel, Kate Spade New York, Tory Burch, Swatch, Cartier, Aeropostale, Swarovski, Crocs, L Octane En Provence, Lotto, Fila, Diadora, Slazenger, Le Coq Sportif, Lacoste, Patagonia, Gant, Japan Tobacco, Camper, Calvin Klein, Persol, Takko Fashion, CCC, IMAX, Lucky Strike, Crate & Barrel, Komfort, Tchibo, Jack & Jones, Vero Moda, Vera Wang, ASOS, River Island, Colin's, Intersport, Oakley, Skechers, Jack Wolfskin, Geox, Salomon, Boohoo, Hummel, Speedo, Wilson, Umbro, Warehouse, Coast, Starter, Champion, Russell Atlantic, Fruit of the Loom, New Era, Kappa, Stüssy, Popbar, Uterqüe, Pull&Bear, Zara Home, Massimo Dutti, Stradivarius, Douglas, Popeyes, Volcom, Empik, DEICHMANN, Tous, Pandora, Dodo Pizza, Apple Store, Discord, Perekrestok, Lenta, AllSaints, Saint Laurent, Abercrombie & Fitch, Smyk, Magnit, Pyaterochka, Mexx, L'Oreal, Danone, Real, Selgros, Topshop, New Look, Guess, Debenhams, Under Armour Rush, H&M, Jysk, Reserved, Mohito, English Home, Henderson, Luhta and ONLY.

Karo, a Russian cinema chain, operates a 17-screen multiplex, one of the largest in Russia.

== Gallery ==
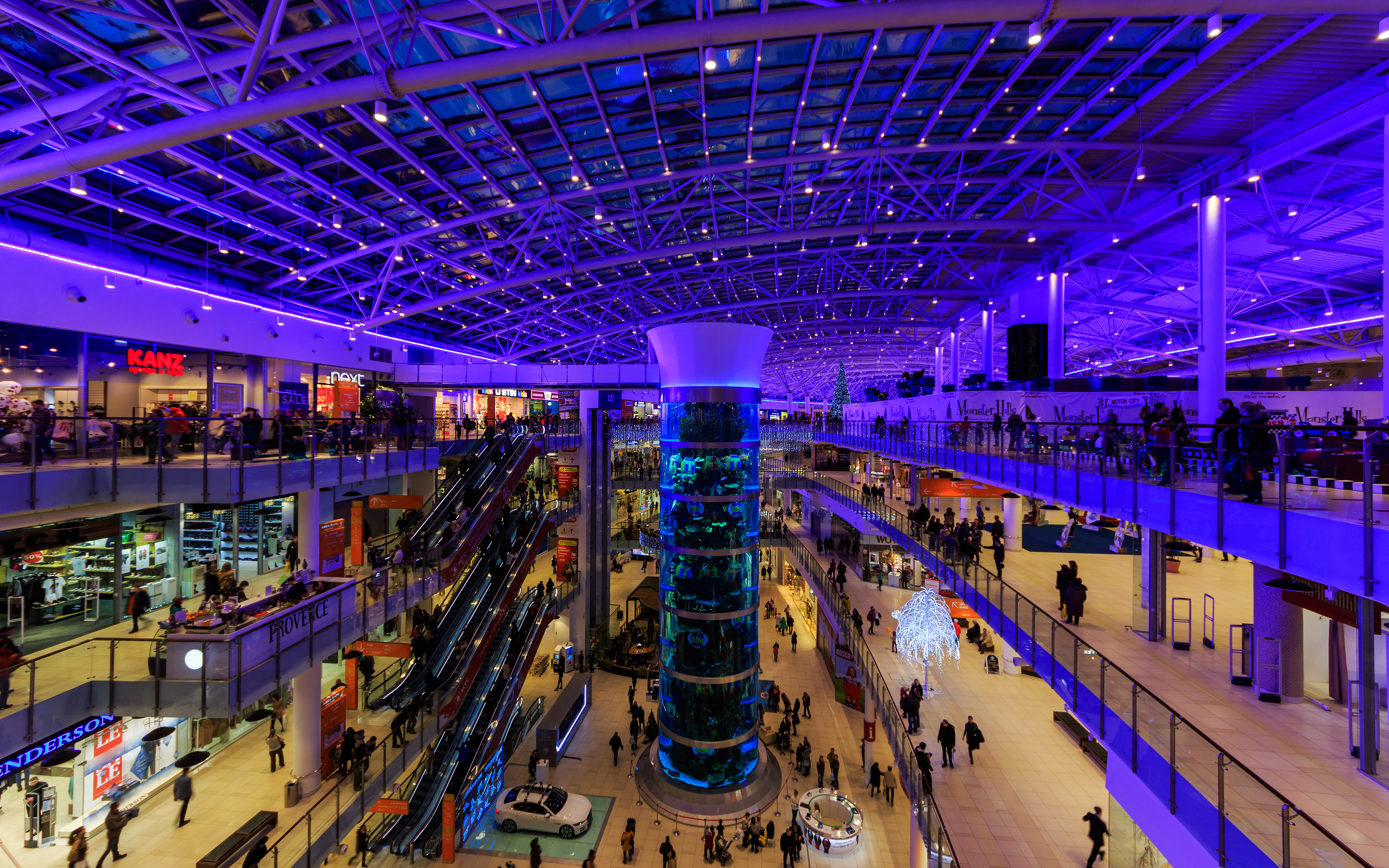
Aquarium in the shopping mall.

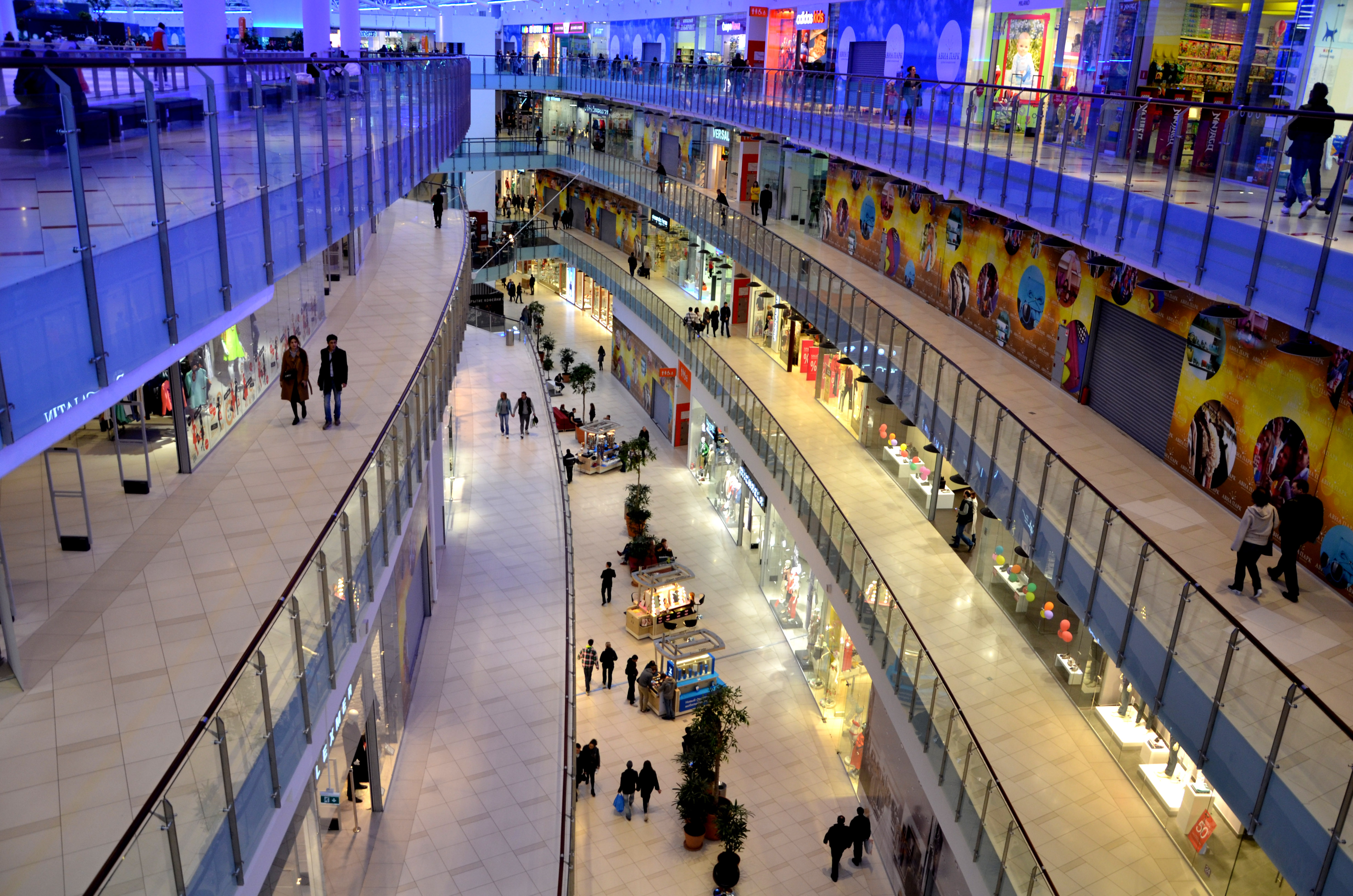
Interior of AviaPark.

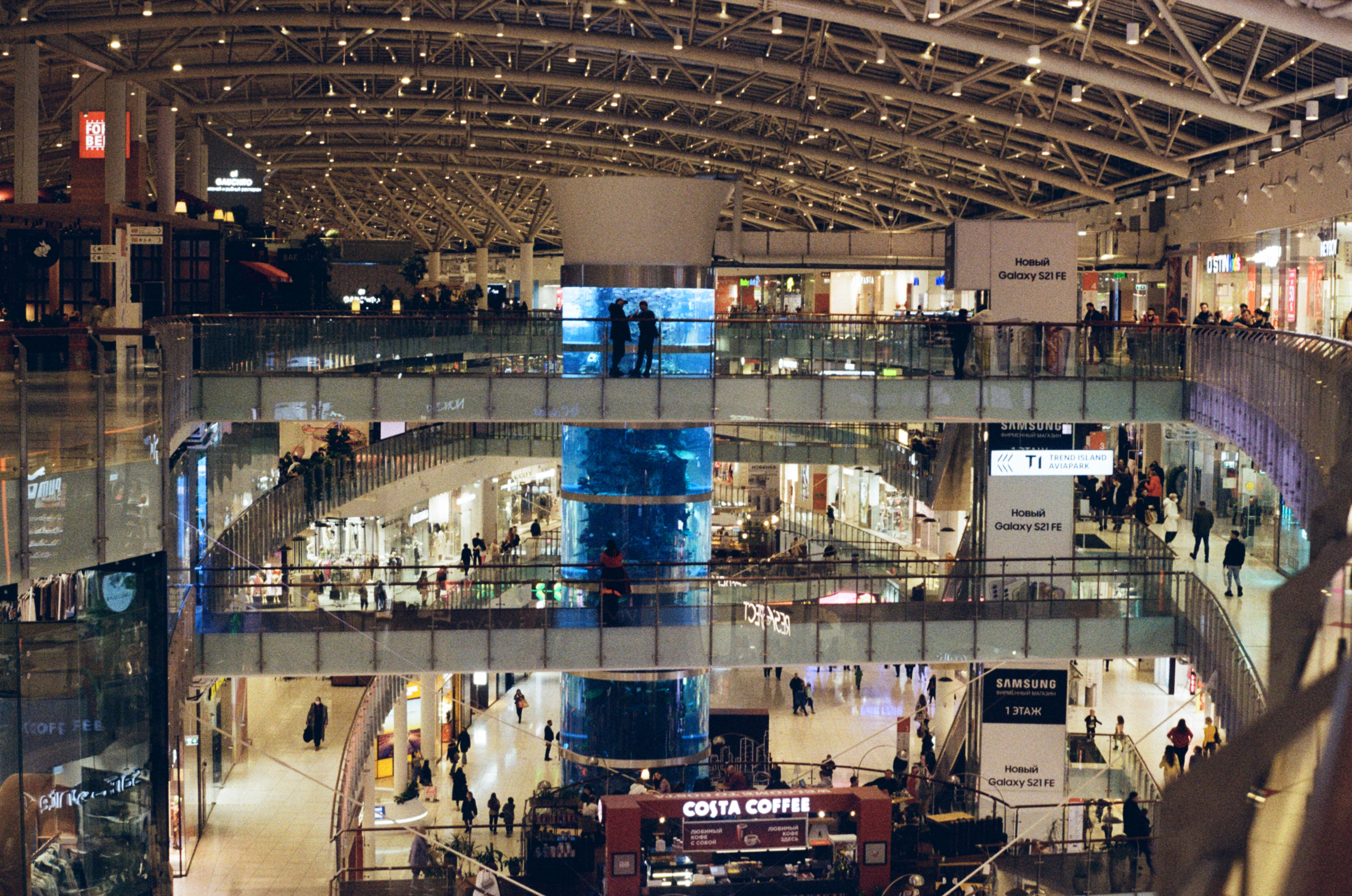
Main hall interior from upper level
