= MEGA Family Shopping Centre =

MEGA Family Shopping Center
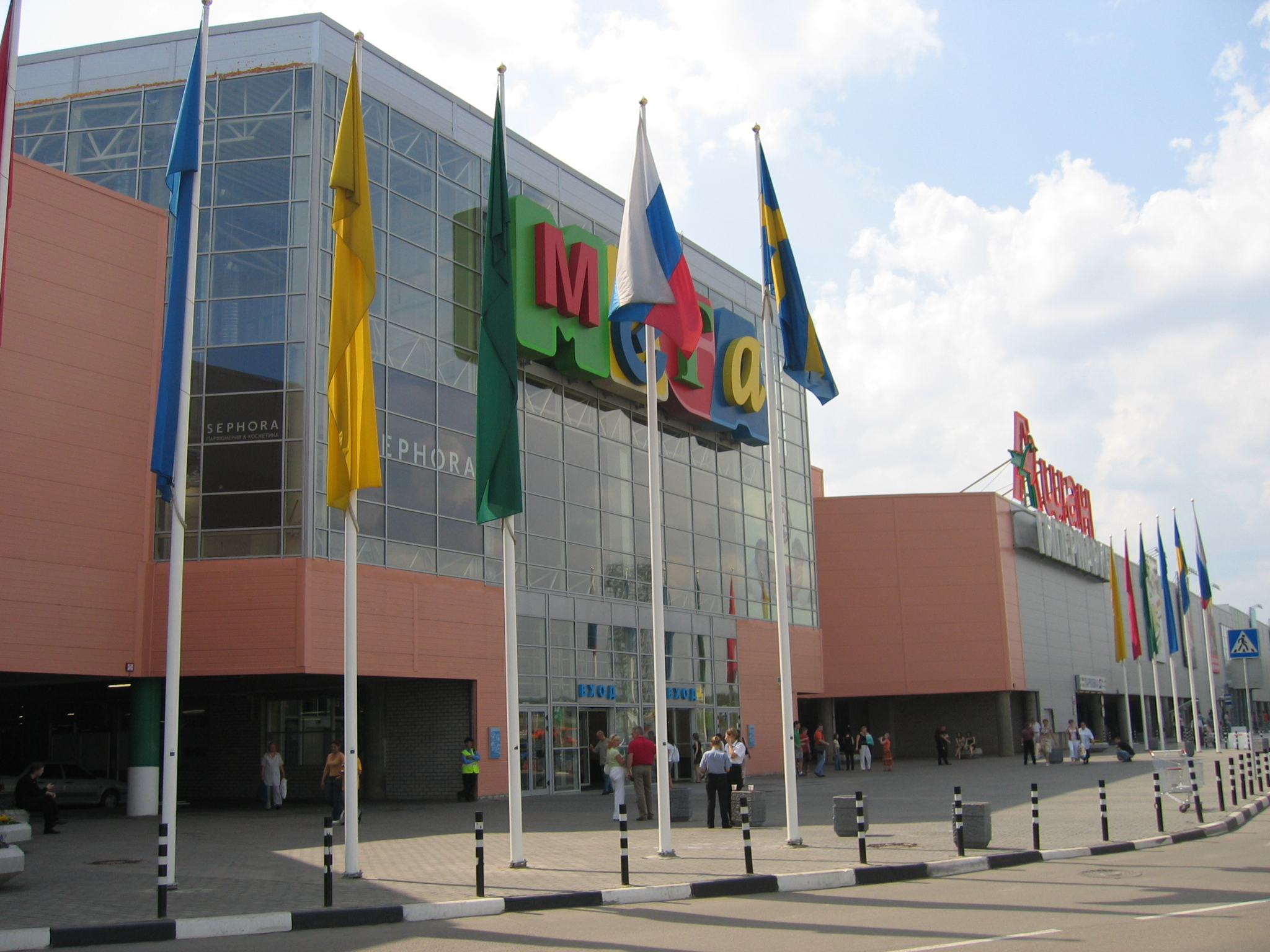
- Location: Omsk, Omsk Oblast, Russia
- Opened: 2002
- Owner: Gazprombank
- Num. of stores: 14
- Floor area: 153,000 sq m
- Floors: 1 floor and a garlow
- Website: mega.ru

MEGA shopping center is a chain of shopping centres that was founded and previously managed and operated by INGKA Centres, the division of lead IKEA franchisee INGKA Holding. On 28 September 2023, INGKA Centres has since sold the operations of all 14 MEGA Shopping Centres to Gazprombank.

MEGA provides about 1.735 million sqm of retail space, and more than half of its tenants are represented by international retailers. It owns and operates 41 malls in 14 countries along with 25 retail parks.

== IKEA Centres Russia ==
IKEA Centre Russia was a part of IKEA Centres, which is INGKA Group's global shopping centre company. Present in China, and Europe (including the Nordic countries).

IKEA Centres Russia was the largest developer on the Russian market with 14 MEGA branded shopping centres located in Russia's 11 largest cities with more than 250 million visitors annually. Each centre comprises circa 124,000 sqm with approximately 200 stores each.

Operations of IKEA Centres in Russia as of 2023:

- 14 MEGA shopping centers (operations of the shopping centers have since been sold to Gazprombank)
- 11 Russian cities
- RUB 98 billion investment
- 2.32 million sqm overall retail space
- 232 million visitors per year
- 2.6 billion visitors since the first MEGA opening
- over 1100 co-workers
- 123.960 sqm average GLA of each MEGA shopping center (1,735,000 sqm total)
- 97% brand awareness level in the cities of presence

== Development in Russia ==
- 2002 — The first shopping centre, MEGA Teply Stan, opening in Moscow.
- 2004 — MEGA Khimki shopping centre opening in Moscow; includes the first Russian IKEA store opened in 2000.
- 2005 — MEGA shopping centre opening in Kazan.
- 2006 — MEGA shopping centres opening in Yekaterinburg, Nizhniy Novgorod and Vsevolozhsk district, Leningrad region (MEGA Dybenko and MEGA Parnas).
- 2006 — First phase’ opening of MEGA Belaya Dacha in Kotelniki (Moscow Region).
- 2007 — MEGA opening in Rostov-on-Don and Novosibirsk.
- 2007 — Second phase’ opening of MEGA Belaya Dacha.
- 2008 — MEGA opening in Adygea Republic.
- 2009 — MEGA shopping centre opening in Omsk.
- 2011 — MEGA shopping centres opening in Ufa and Samara.
- 2014 — Russia investment plans announced, the investment amount exceeds RUB 100 billion. The money will be spent on the commercial upgrade in the existing shopping centres and new shopping centres development.
- 2022 — In a response to the 2022 Russian invasion of Ukraine, IKEA closed on a temporary basis but stated that it kept the MEGA shopping centres open to "ensure that ... people ... [had] access to ... food, groceries and pharmacies."
- 2023 — INGKA Centres sold the operations of the MEGA Family Shopping Centre chain in Russia to Gazprombank on 28 September 2023.

=== Khimki fire ===
On 9 December 2022, a major fire started in the MEGA shopping centre in Khimki, burning 18,000 square metres (190,000 sq ft) of the centre, with one death. Local authorities stated that the fire was not the result of arson. A criminal investigation based on safety violations was opened into the incident.

== List of MEGA malls ==
List of MEGA malls
Name	Location	Total retail floor area (GLA) (m^{2})	Total area (m^{2})	Shops	Parking Spaces
MEGA Belaya Dacha	Kotelniki, Moscow Oblast	222,000	304,000	320	8,500
MEGA Khimki	Khimki, Moscow Oblast	175,000	210,600	214	8,700
MEGA Teply Stan	Sosenskoye Settlement, NAO, Federal City of Moscow	155,000	180,500	208	8,780
MEGA Dybenko	Vsevolozhsky District, Leningrad Oblast	140,400	182,000	208	7,700
MEGA Rostov-on-Don	Aksay, Rostov-on-Don	103,100	130,600	209	5,700
MEGA Samara	Samara	101,400	133,000	186	6,500
MEGA Omsk	Omsk	124,300	161,400	185	7,400
MEGA Parnas	Vsevolozhsky District, Leningrad Oblast	101,500	127,400	160	6,900
MEGA Adygea-Kuban	Krasnodar	101,300	124,700	165	6,200
MEGA Ekaterinburg	Yekaterinburg	99,500	130,000	175	5,800
MEGA Kazan	Kazan	91,500	112,500	166	6,500
MEGA Novosibirsk	Novosibirsk	103,200	130,500	203	6,500
MEGA Nizhny Novgorod	Fedyakovo, Nizhegorodskaya Oblast	102,500	125,500	155	6,800
MEGA Ufa	Ufa	114,700	141,800	187	6,600

== Products and services ==
=== Anchor tenants ===
MEGA centres are supported by anchors such as Auchan, OBI, Leroy Merlin, M.Video, MediaMarkt Lego and Decathlon.

=== Brands ===
Typically MEGA shopping centre has more than 70% foreign retailers including western brands such as GAP, Banana Republic, Tommy Hilfiger, Starbucks, Victoria's Secret Beauty & Accessories, Steve Madden, Zara, H&M, Marks & Spencer, Next, Karen Millen, Accessorize, Under Armour, Urban Outfitters, Lacoste, Forever 21 and many more. Russian tenants in MEGA include Sportmaster, L'Etoile, Gloria Jeans, TVOE, Carlo Pazolini etc.

In 2015, 90 brands chose MEGA as a partner to launch and develop business in Russia including DeFacto, Pimkie, Wrangler, Converse and Popbar. Also in 2015, a number of Russian and international brands grew their presence in MEGA shopping centers such as L'Etoile, TVOE, Carlo Pazolini, Mango, Colin's, Finn Flare, Adidas, KFC, McDonald's, Detsky Mir, Econika, Calvin Klein Jeans, Triumph, Karen Millen, Calvin Klein, Nike, Topshop, IKEA, River Island, Stockmann, Puma, O'STIN, Mothercare, BHS, ELC, Hamleys, Chicco, Hollister, Burger King, Furla, Nine West, Xiaomi, Reebok, Ecco, Samsung, Zolla, The Body Shop, Sinsay, Megafon, Beeline, DNS, Kari, MTS, New Look, Sephora, Adidas Originals, Guess, Debenhams United Colors Of Benetton Massimo Dutti Sunlight Sela C&A and other brands presented renewed store concepts.

=== Food courts ===
In 2014, the company announced plans for the food courts renovations and a new concept launch for cafes and restaurants in MEGAs. The project was part of the global modernisation programme in MEGA shopping centers.

Within the renewed format, cafes and restaurants are united in one space with a sitting area and leisure and entertainment zones.

In December 2015, MEGA Teply Stan finished a massive reconstruction of the food court.

Within the commercial upgrade programme in the shopping centers and food courts reconstruction, in 2016 MEGA shopping centers opened new cafes and restaurants: Correa's, ObedBufet (Ginza Project), Kitchennete, Krispy Kreme, Dunkin' Donuts Menza, Zotman Pizza Pie and others. MEGA Khimki opened the largest culinary studio by Julia Vysotskaya and a unique farmer market MEGA FARM LavkaLavka. MEGA Teply Stan opened a US Magnolia Bakery.

== Financial results ==
In 2015 financial year, the footfall to MEGA shopping centers was 275 million visitors. On average, MEGA shopping centers in Moscow are visited by 35 million customers per year.

The overall tenant sales in 2015 financial year were RUB 362 billion. Based on the results of the 2015 financial year, the share of free space (on average in all MEGA centers) is 1.4%.
