= Bork =

Bork may refer to:

- Bork (surname)
  - Robert Bork (1927–2012), American jurist
- Bork (character), a fictional superhero in the DC Comics universe
- Bork (company), a European home appliance manufacturer
- Börk, Hanak, Turkish village
- DoggoLingo, also known as bork, an Internet language of words used to refer to dogs
- Bork, a part of Selm, Germany
- Bórk, a village in the Pomeranian Voivodeship, Poland

== See also ==
- The Swedish Chef, a Muppet who appeared in The Muppet Show, was known for his exuberant interjection of "Bork, bork, bork!"
- Bork Lazer
