= CrossIron Mills =

Shopping mall near Calgary, Alberta, Canada

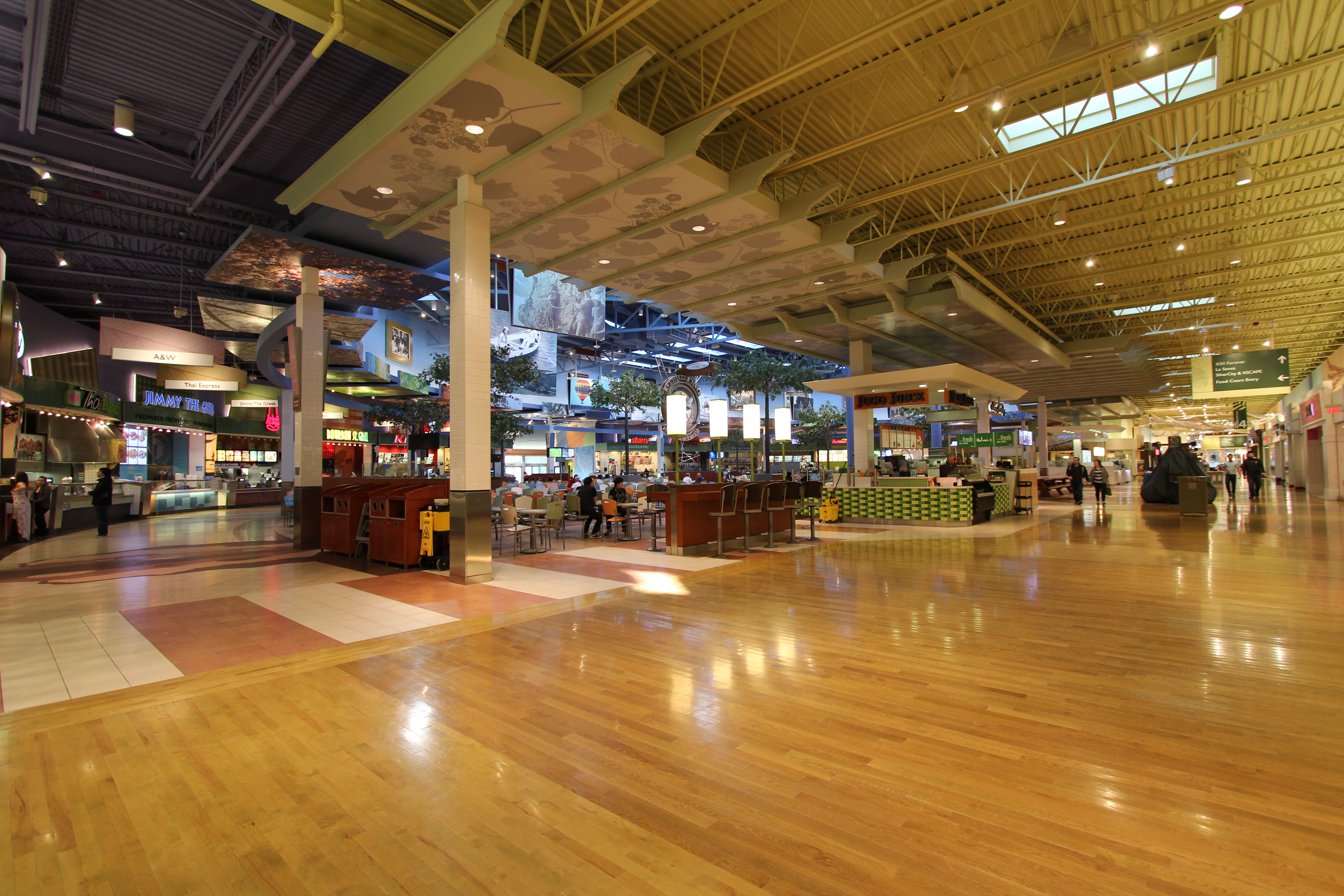
- Food court wing before relocation (April 2014)
- Location: Rocky View County, near Calgary, Alberta, Canada
- Coordinates: 51.205°N 113.99°W
- Address: 261055 CrossIron Blvd
- Opened: August 19, 2009; 17 years ago
- Renovated: 2015–2017
- Previous names: East Balzac Mall (planning, c. 2006–2008)
- Developer: Ivanhoé Cambridge
- Manager: JLL Properties
- Owner: Ivanhoé Cambridge (trading as La Caisse)
- Architect: JPRA Architects; DIALOG (Cohos Evamy)
- Num. of stores: 220+ (at peak)
- Num. of anchor tenants: 18 (at peak)
- Floor area: 109,440 square metres (1,178,000 sq ft)
- Floors: 1
- Parking: Parking lot with 6,000 free spaces
- Website: crossironmills.com
- Building details
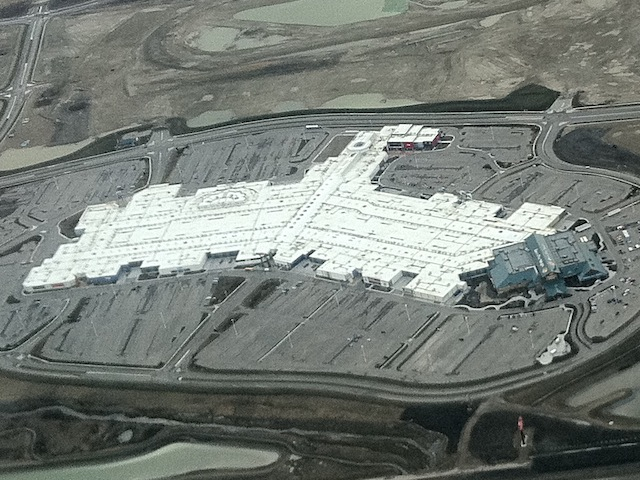
- Aerial photograph of the Y-shaped shopping centre in May 2011

General information
- Status: Operational
- Construction started: June 2007; 19 years ago
- Completed: 2009

Design and construction
- Main contractor: Ledcor Construction

Renovating team
- Architect: Smith + Andersen
- Renovating firm: Ivanhoé Cambridge

CrossIron Mills is a super-regional outlet centre in just outside the northern city limits of Calgary, Alberta, Canada, and immediately east of the hamlet of Balzac in Rocky View County. It was developed and is owned by Ivanhoé Cambridge, a major Canadian real estate company. Completed in August 2009, the mall is the largest single-level shopping centre in Alberta, containing approximately 109,440 m^{2} (1,178,000 sq ft) of retail and entertainment space. Century Downs Racetrack and Casino is nearby to the east.

The first tenant to open in the mall was the first Alberta franchise of Bass Pro Shops Outdoor World, which opened its doors in the spring of 2009, while the rest of the mall was under construction. The majority of the mall opened on August 19, 2009. A final phase initially referred to as the Entertainment Neighbourhood opened in the summer of 2010. In the mid-2010s, this final phase was reconfigured to house a relocated food court (branded as the CrossIron Mills Food Hall), with the original food court being redeveloped into additional retail space. Despite having the "Mills" term in its name, and the mall's "racetrack" format, it was not developed by the Mills Corporation, but rather inspired by it. Mills pulled out of the project in August 2006 due to financial difficulties.

== History ==
=== 2004–2009: Planning and construction ===
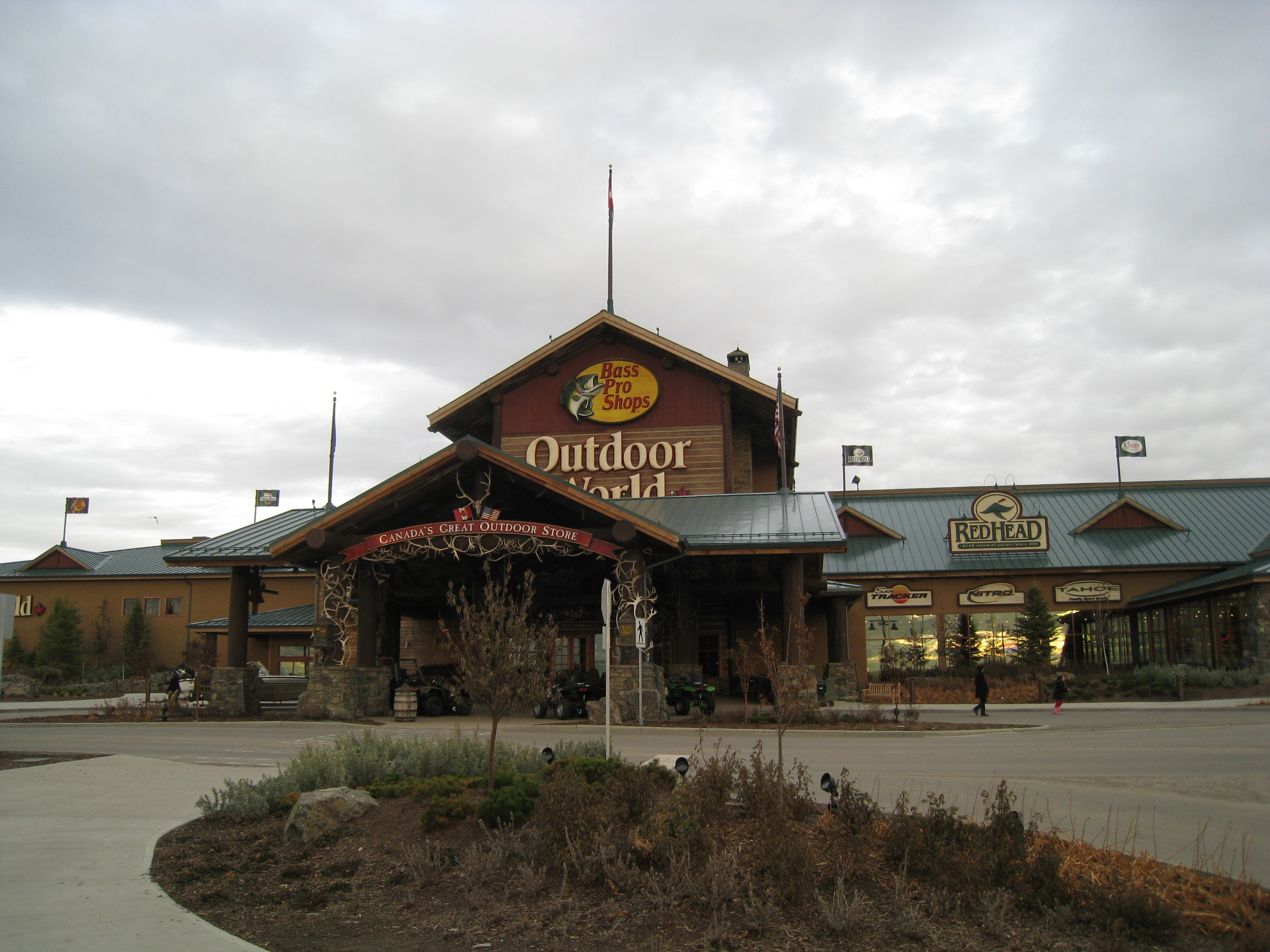
Bass Pro Shops Outdoor World entrance (October 2009)

Following the success of Vaughan Mills, which had its grand opening in November 2004, Ivanhoé Cambridge, a subsidiary of Caisse de dépôt et placement du Québec, announced plans to develop similar shopping centres in Canada with its partner, the Chevy Chase, Maryland-based Mills Corporation. However, in May 2006, The Mills Corporation was being investigated by the United States Securities and Exchange Commission (SEC) due to extensive accounting irregularities and fraudulent financial reporting. As a result, Mills sold its properties outside of the U.S. to Ivanhoé Cambridge for CA$1.1 billion on August 15, 2006. During this acquisition, Ivanhoé Cambridge's Chief Investment Officer, Paul Chehab, explicitly stated that the exit of the Mills Corporation would not affect plans to replicate the Landmark Mills hybrid-outlet concept in other Canadian cities.

Construction on East Balzac Mall, the placeholder name for CrossIron Mills, began in June 2007. On January 15, 2008, the 700-acre (280 ha) site managed by DC-109 since April 2006 was officially approved by the Rocky View County Council for commercial and retail use. The shopping centre development would feature outlet stores, a themed food court, entertainment, and a single-level "racetrack" format. A critical requirement for the approval were stormwater management ponds, that were designed as constructed wetlands as part of the improved Comprehensive Landscape Strategy. They were a regulatory requirement integrated into the Master Site Development Plans (MSDP). The mall was designed by JPRA Architects and Cohos Evamy (now DIALOG). The general contractor was Ledcor Construction.

While the mall was still under construction, the first tenant, Bass Pro Shops, opened its doors in March 2009. It was their first store in Alberta.

=== 2009–2012: Grand opening and early years ===
CrossIron Mills celebrated its grand opening on August 19, 2009, marking the first enclosed regional mall developed in Alberta in over 20 years. Thousands of shoppers attended the debut of the 1.4-million-square-foot (130,000 m^{2}) facility, resulting in high traffic. The shopping centre featured several "first-to-market" retailers for the province, including Gap Generation and the largest Toys "R" Us in the area. The mall cost $500 million to develop. Some attendees lined up for the grand opening as early as 5 p.m. MDT. CrossIron Mills had approximately 250,000 people visiting the mall in the first five days of opening day."250,000 Visit CrossIron Mills During Opening Weekend". Calgary Herald. August 26, 2009.

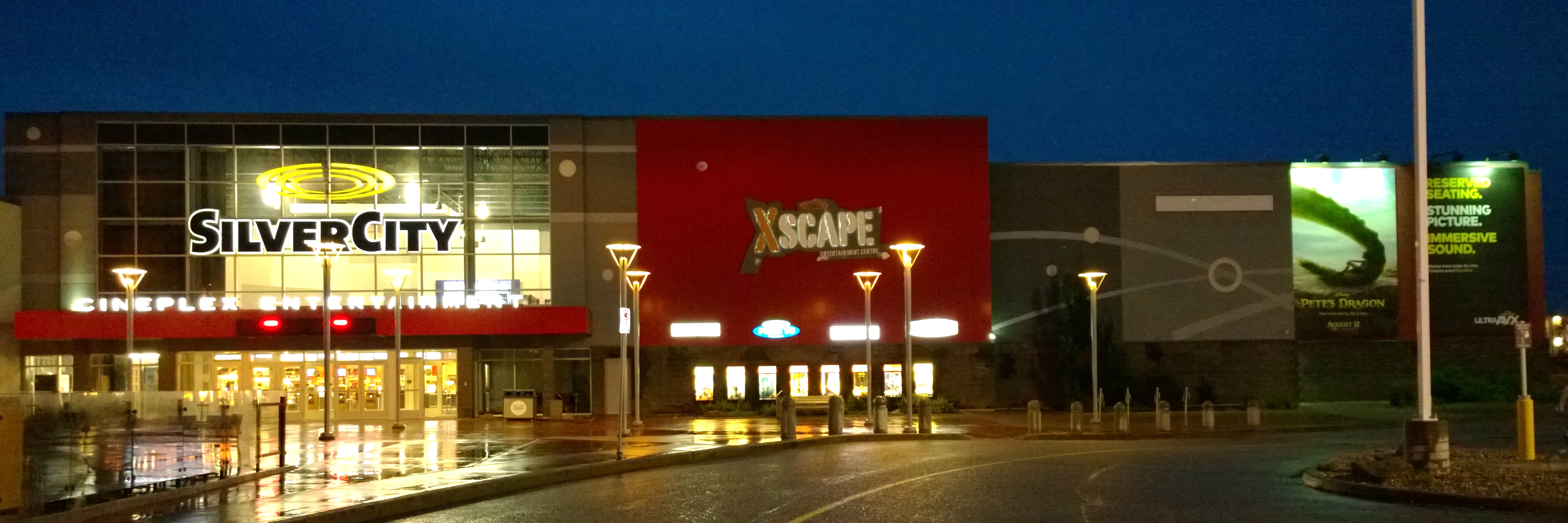
SilverCity CrossIron Mills Cinemas & Xscape Entertainment Centre exterior entrance at night (July 2016)

On June 22, 2010, Cineplex Entertainment announced that a movie theatre and arcade complex branded as the SilverCity CrossIron Mills Cinemas & Xscape Entertainment Centre would have its grand opening on June 30, with seven auditoriums. It was the first location in Western Canada to introduce UltraAVX (Ultra Audio Visual Experience), featuring a larger screen and Dolby Digital surround sound. The movie theatre cost $15 million to develop. The mall attracted 8.25 million visitors from July 1, 2011 to July 31, 2012, and became a tourist attraction. On August 20, 2012, Hugo Boss Outlet opened, along with plans to introduce 15 stores to CrossIron Mills, including Calvin Klein and Van Heusen. Puma opened on August 27, and the mall was estimated to be roughly 90% leased by the end of 2012. This contradicted initial market reception and risks.

=== 2014–2017: Redevelopment ===
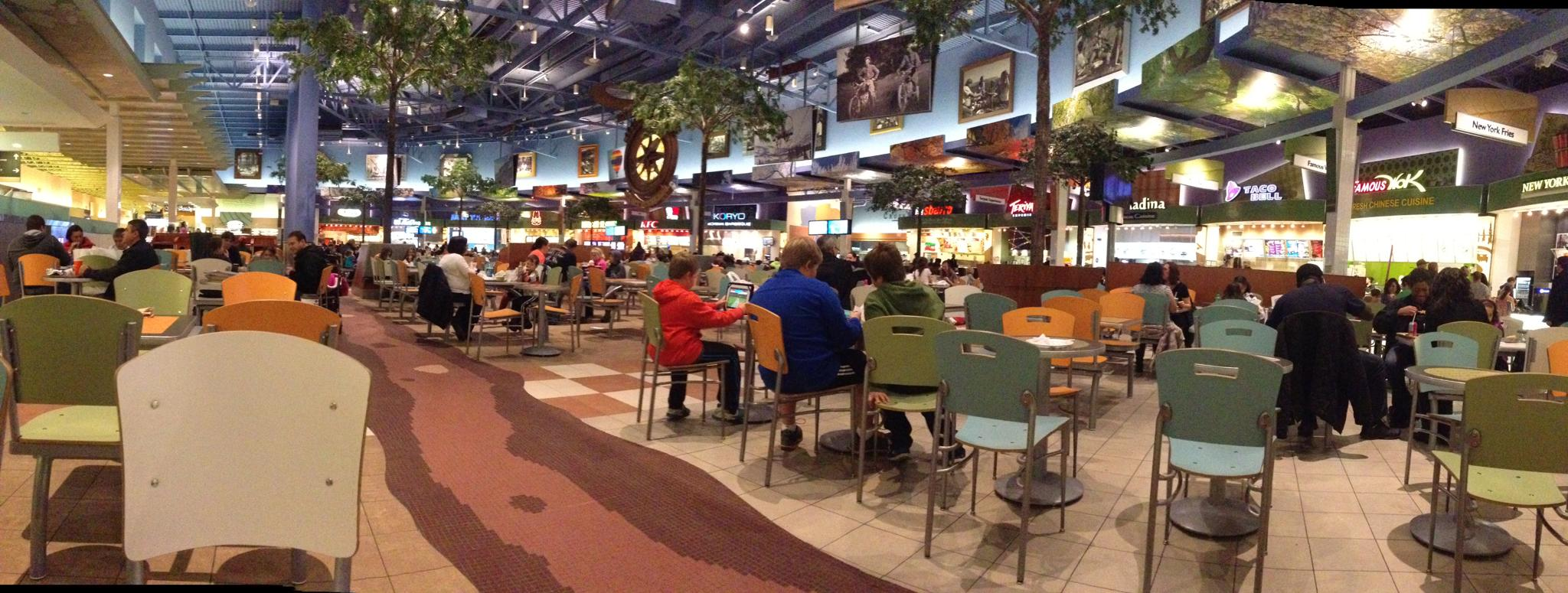
Panoramic view of the original food court in January 2013

On August 13, 2014, Ivanhoé Cambridge announced that the mall was planned to be expanded, which would include relocation of the food court. The original food court would be converted to include 46,000 square feet (4,300 m^{2}) of retail space. Construction was scheduled to start in January 2015, with the first phase of the expansion was expected to open during the spring of 2016. The updated, $60 million food court, branded as the CrossIron Mills Food Hall, had its grand opening on July 27, 2016 with a ribbon-cutting ceremony. At the time, it featured ≈1,400 seats and 24 restaurants, some of which including Chachi's, Popbar, Big Smoke Burger, Marble Slab Creamery, and Uni Sushi. Many existing vendors from the original food court transitioned to the new hall. It also included an additional mall entrance.

As part of the mall's commitment to sustainable development, the revamped food court also contained more green space, improved kitchen exhaust hoods for reduced energy consumption and revamped recycling amenities. The food court was designed by the local architectural firm Smith + Andersen, which installed modern HVAC and LED lighting. The expansions added 4,272 square metres (45,980 sq ft) of retail space. The original food court was demolished and converted to feature additional retail space, including Victoria's Secret, Shoppers Drug Mart, and Milestones Grill and Bar, and a renovation on the mall's Sport Chek store.

=== 2018–present: Events ===
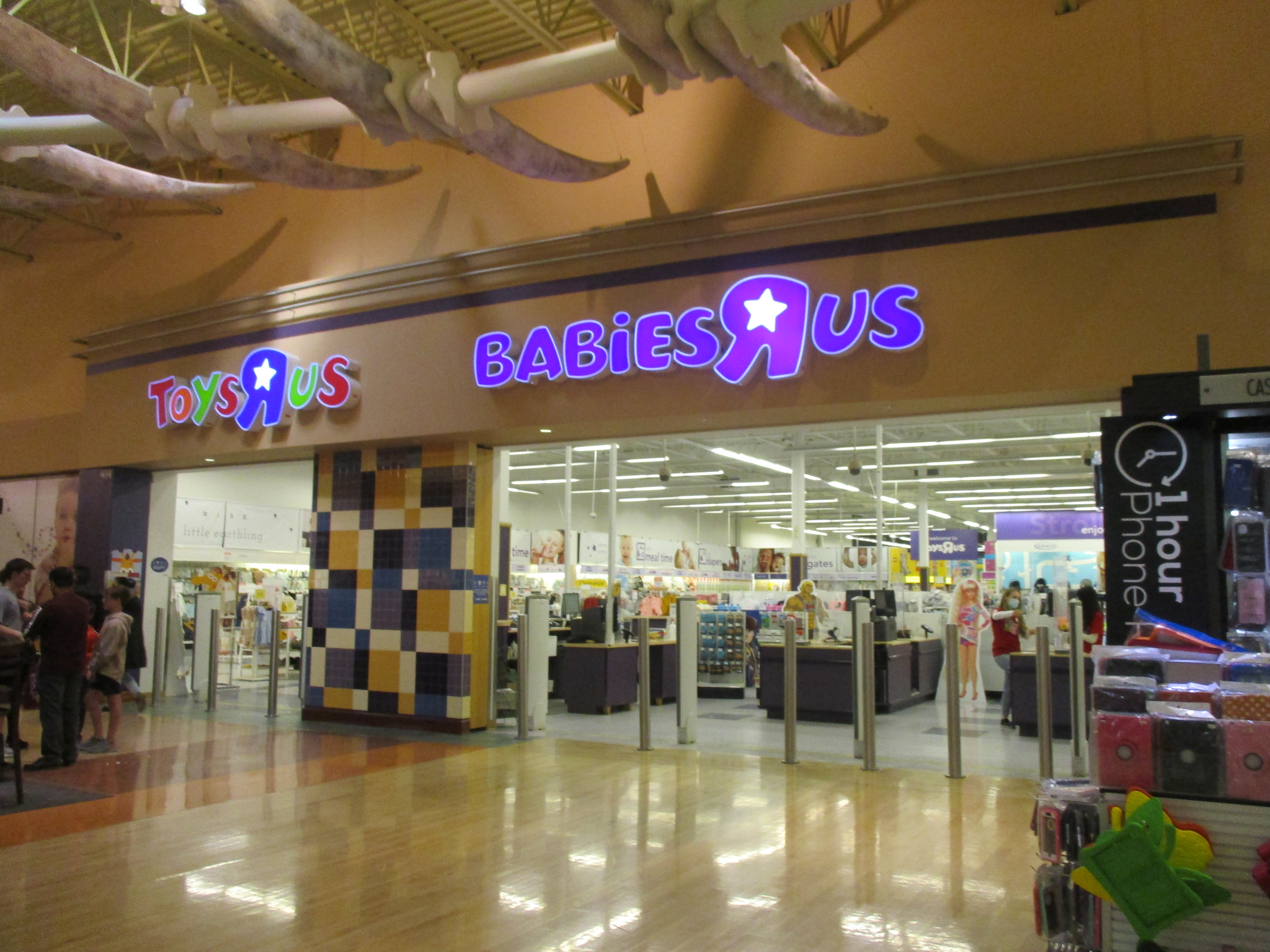
Toys "R" Us and Babies "R" Us entrances in May 2022

By October 2018, several tenants had opened at CrossIron Mills, including a 20,000 sq ft (1,900 m^{2}) Skechers superstore, Kate Spade New York, Aldo, Auntie Anne's Pretzels, and the Japanese-based MINISO dollar store. General Manager James Moller stated that the mall had 98.4% occupancy, with an estimated 99.1% at the end of the year. From August 9 to 19, 2019, CrossIron Mills celebrated its 10th anniversary, with the event being themed Roll With It. The festivities included a light show and a special edition of PARKSHOW, a large-scale fashion show and art market. Free promotional items and "swag" were distributed to shoppers throughout the 10-day event. An indoor roller skating rink was set up inside the shopping centre (hence the name "Roll With It"). A birthday cake area, dubbed Calories Don't Count, was also introduced, alongside the Treat Yo Self wall in Neighbourhood 2. Due to the COVID-19 pandemic, the mall's operating hours were reduced on March 15, 2020, with the entire shopping centre closing temporarily on March 28, excluding essential services. The mall reopened to the public on May 14, 2020, under strict social distancing conditions. In late August 2021, it was announced that JLL of Chicago, Illinois, would take over leasing and management of CrossIron Mills.

In March 2023, Nordstrom Rack announced that it would close permanently in June, as Nordstrom Canada went out of business entirely. Bed Bath & Beyond also went defunct, shutting down all Canadian locations in April 2023 due to Chapter 11 bankruptcy. On October 3, 2025, Uniqlo opened at the shopping centre. It was its third store in Calgary. In December of that year, the mall's Tesla Superchargers—which operated since 2017—were deemed non-functional and were replaced with a 180kW Wallbox Supernova hub. In January 2026, Toys "R" Us permanently closed its doors. The CrossIron Mills location was its last presence in the Calgary area.

== Gallery ==
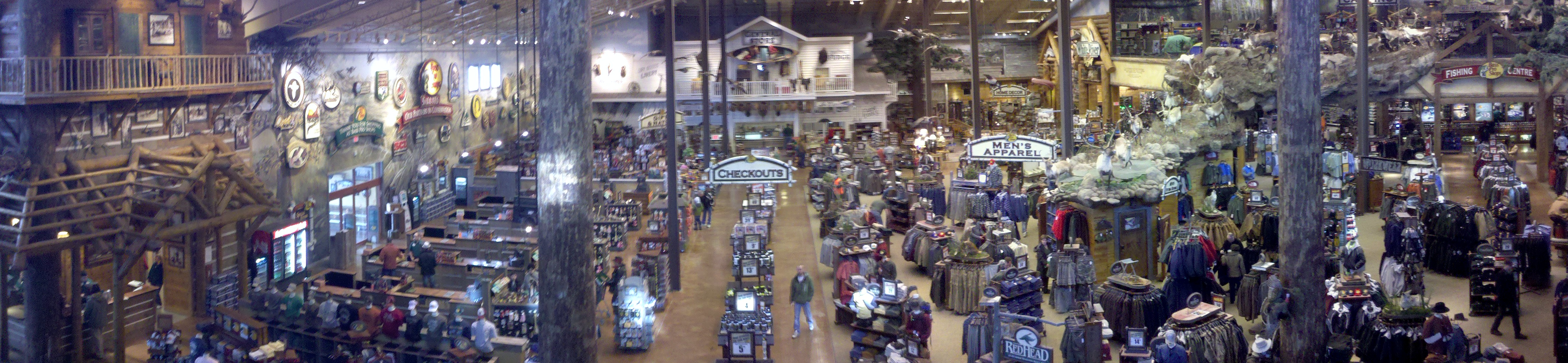
Interior of Bass Pro Shops Outdoor World in March 2011 (Paranomic view)
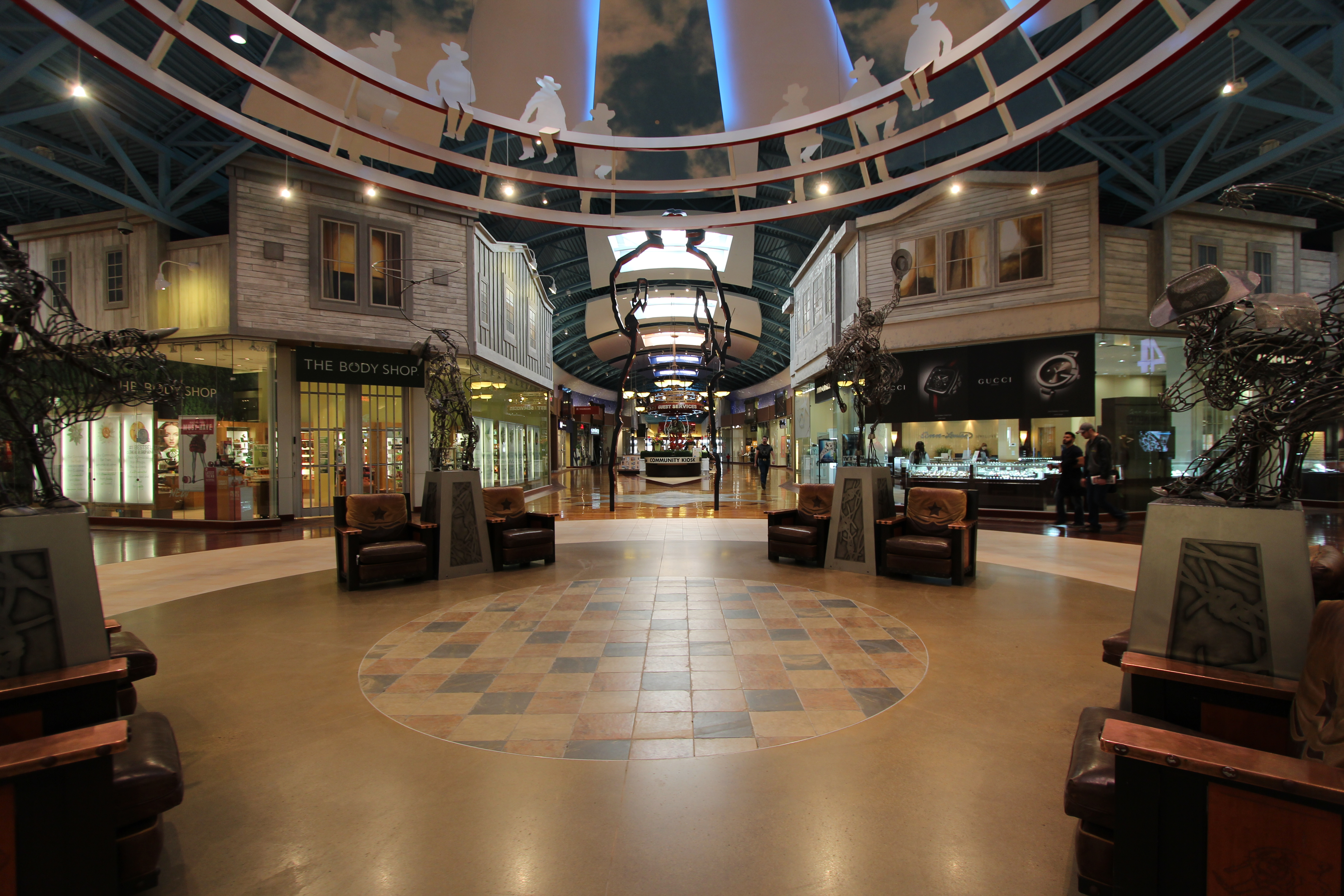
Fashion Neighbourhood (April 2014)

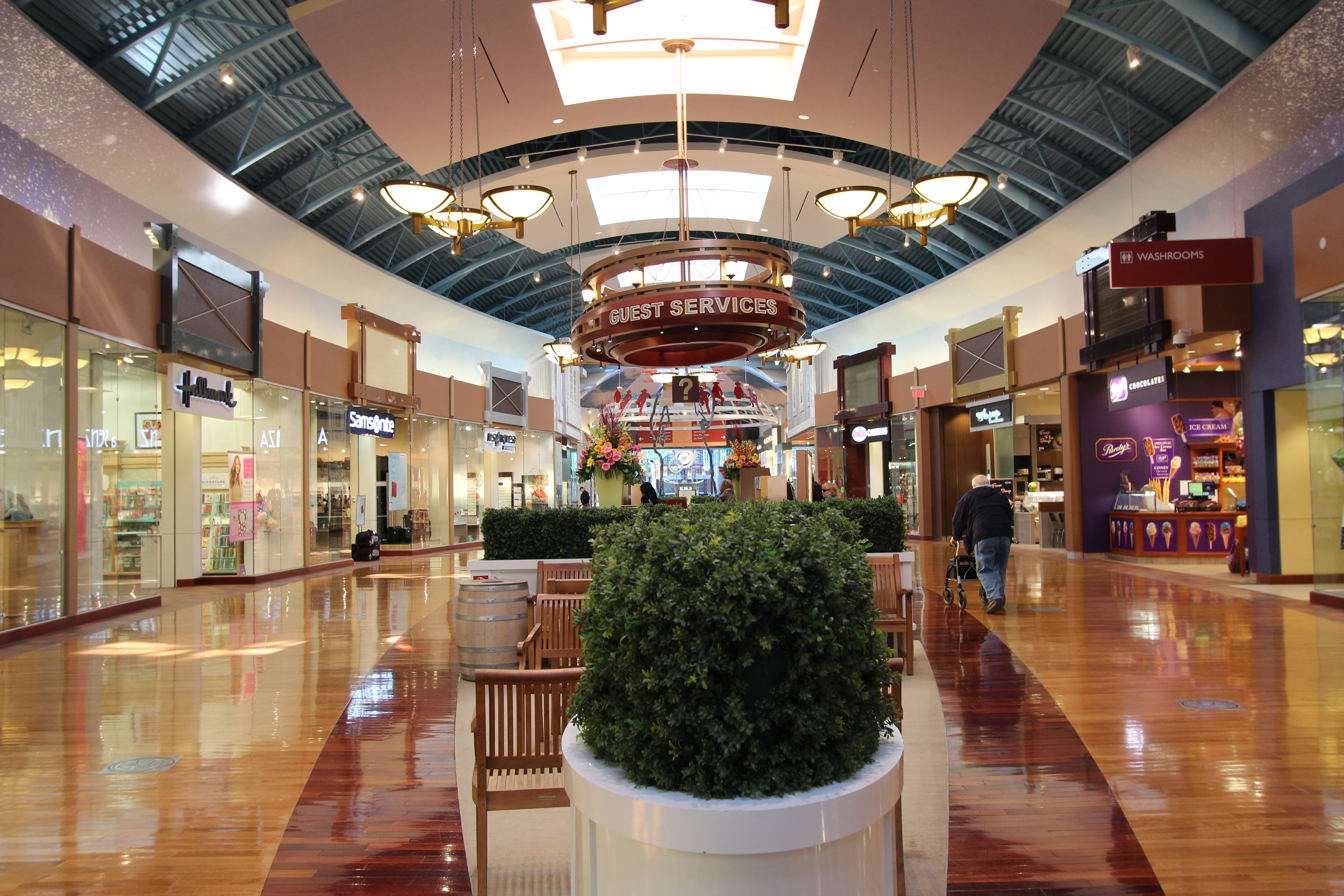
Guest Services Court (April 2014)

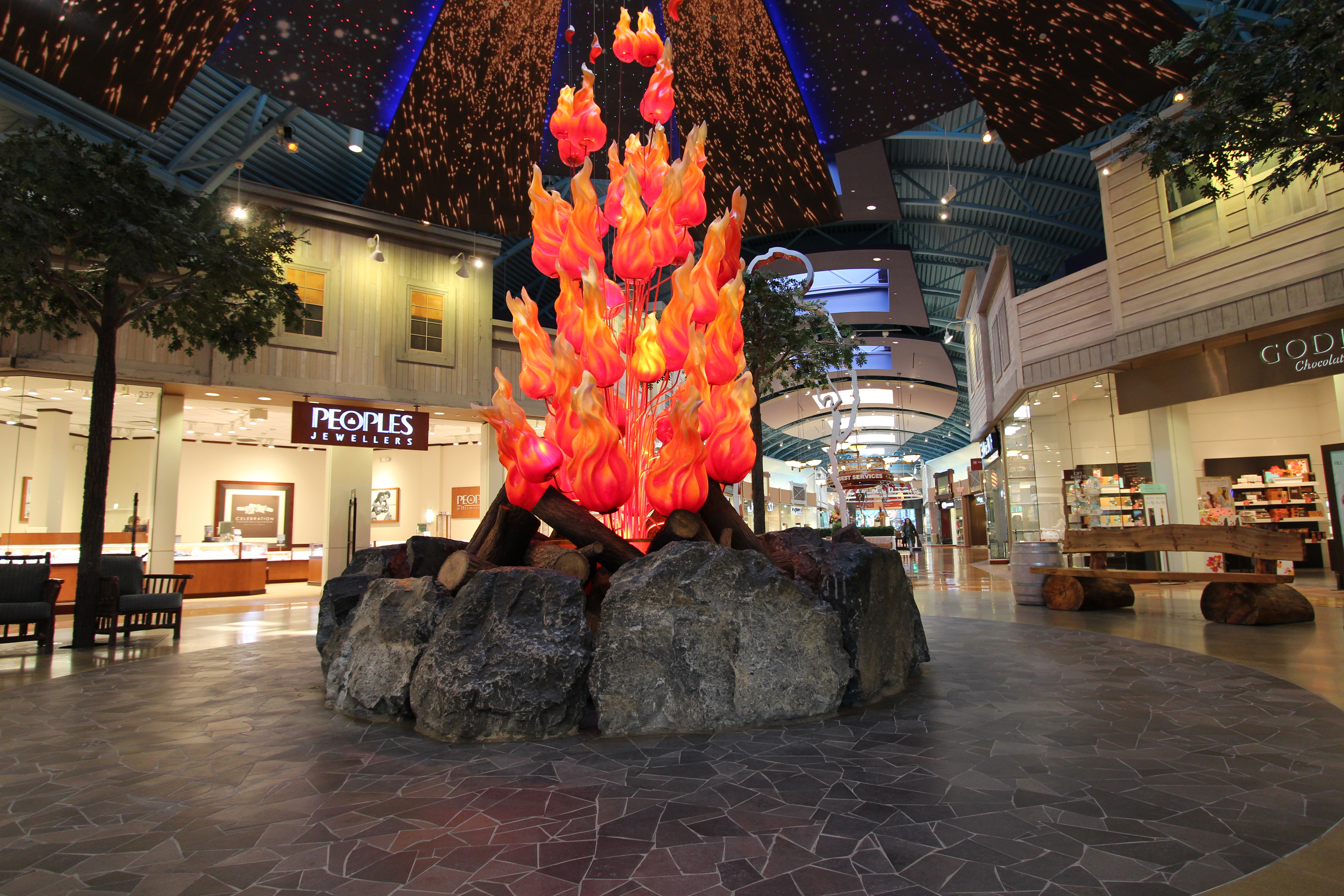
Fire sculpture (April 2014)

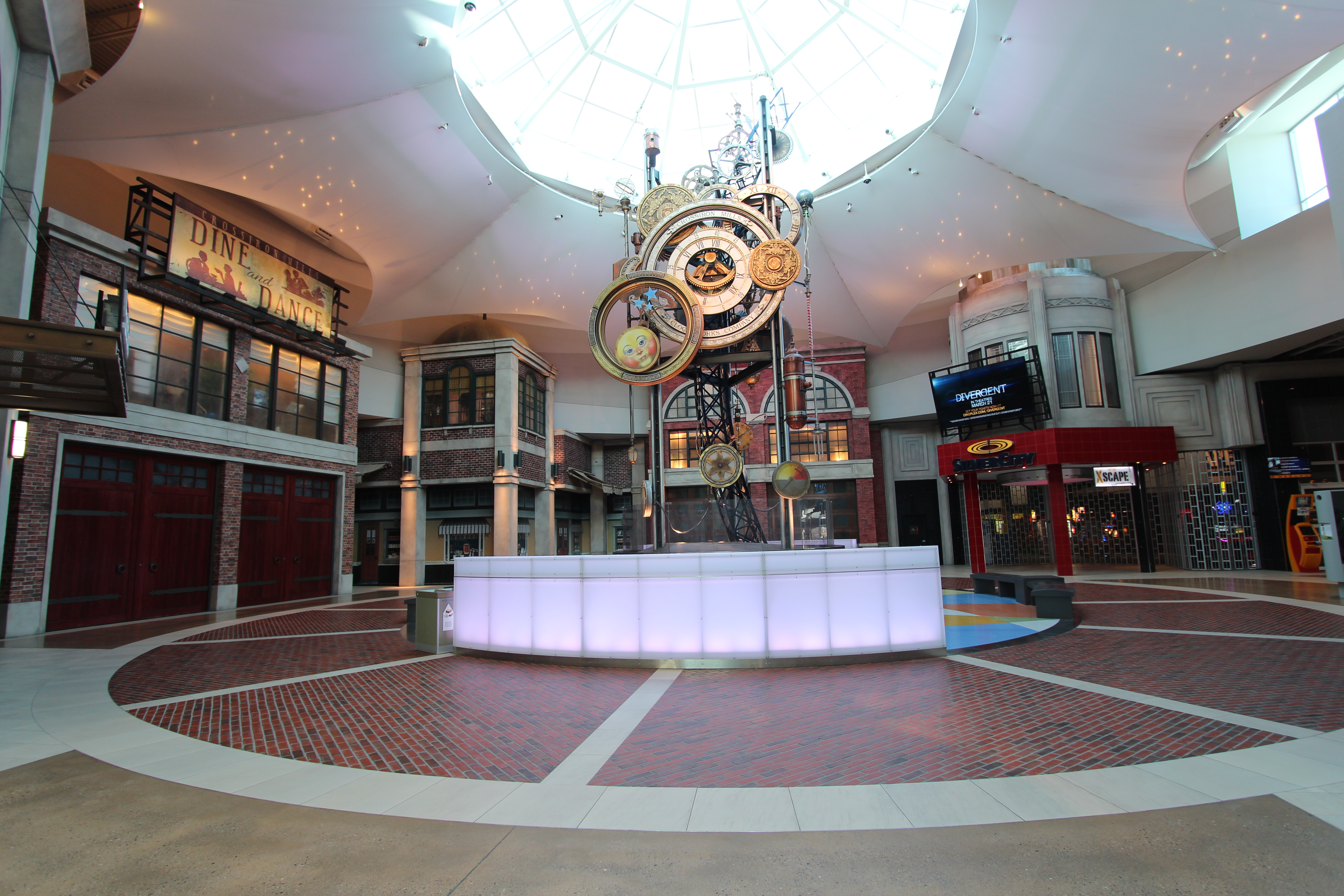
Clock inside the mall (April 2014)

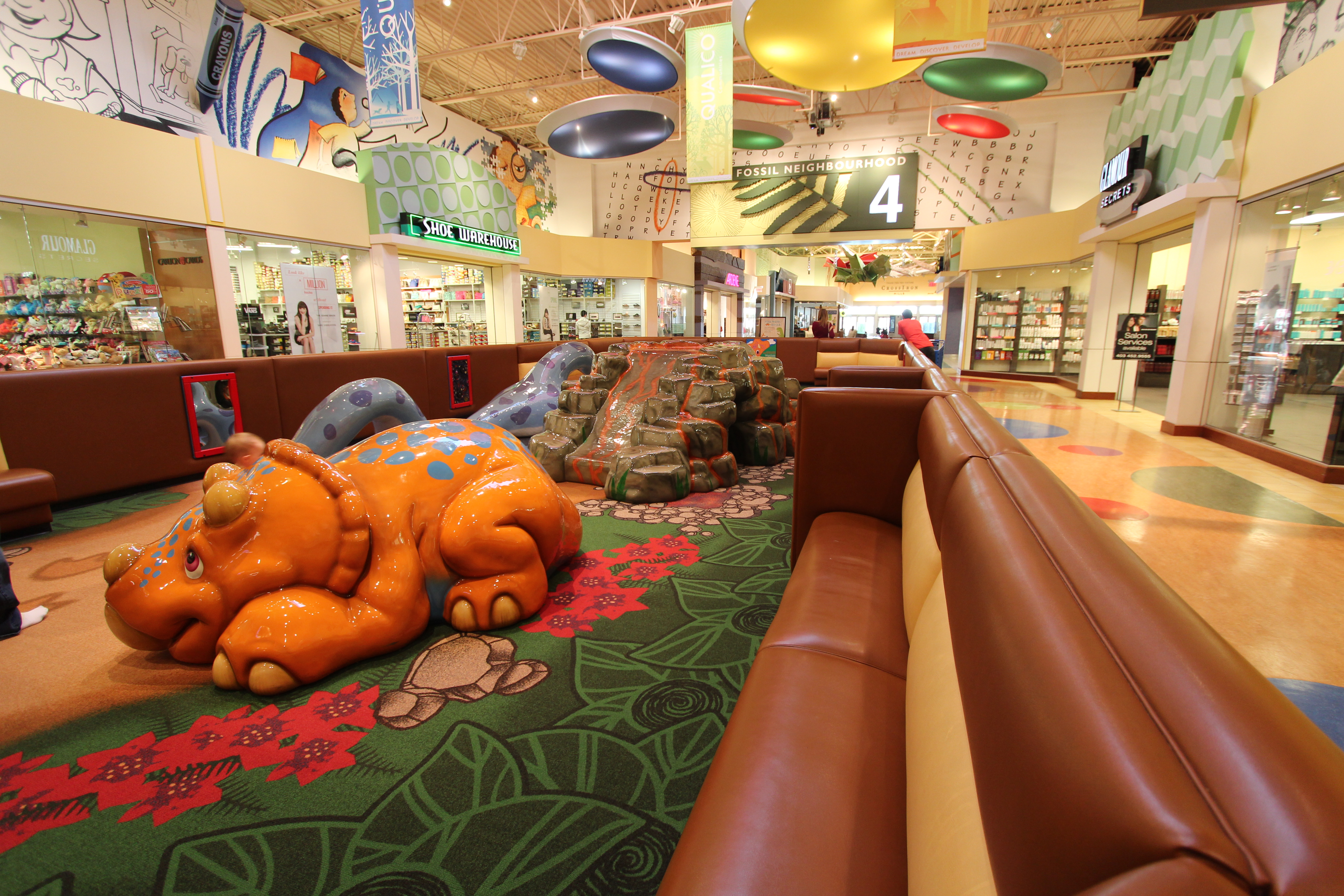
Fossil Neighbourhood (April 2014)

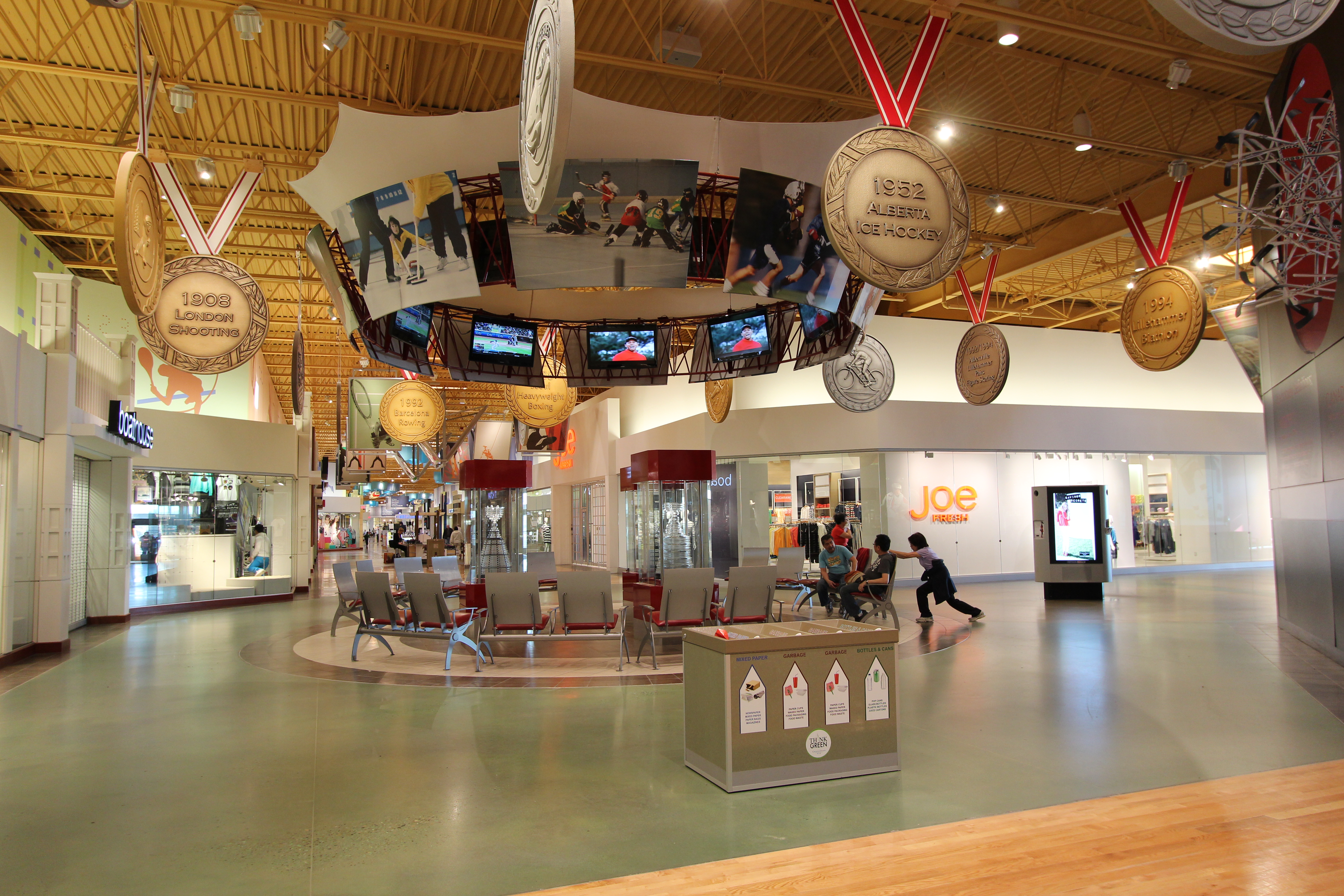
Sport Neighbourhood (April 2014)

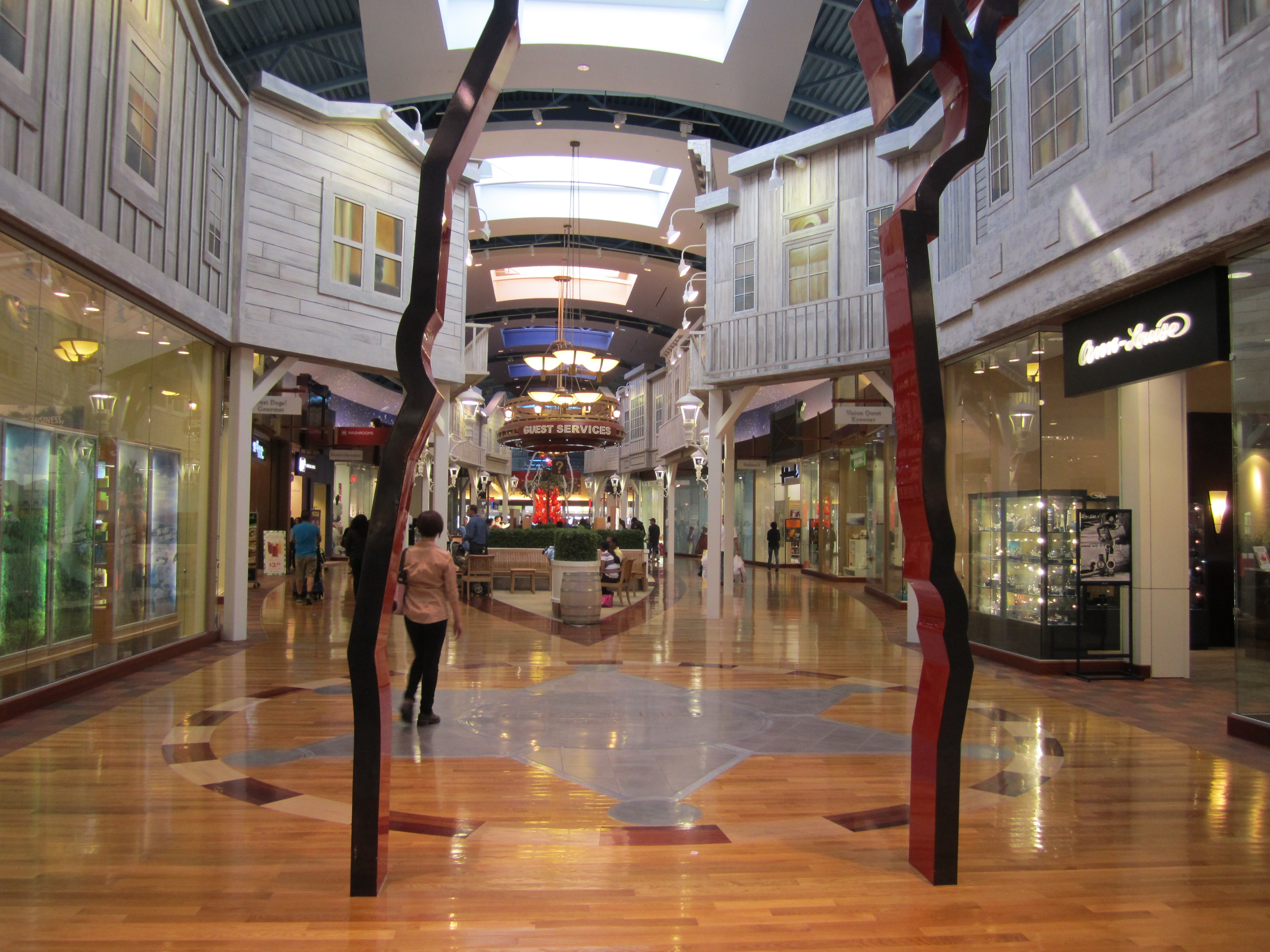
Concourse (September 2011)

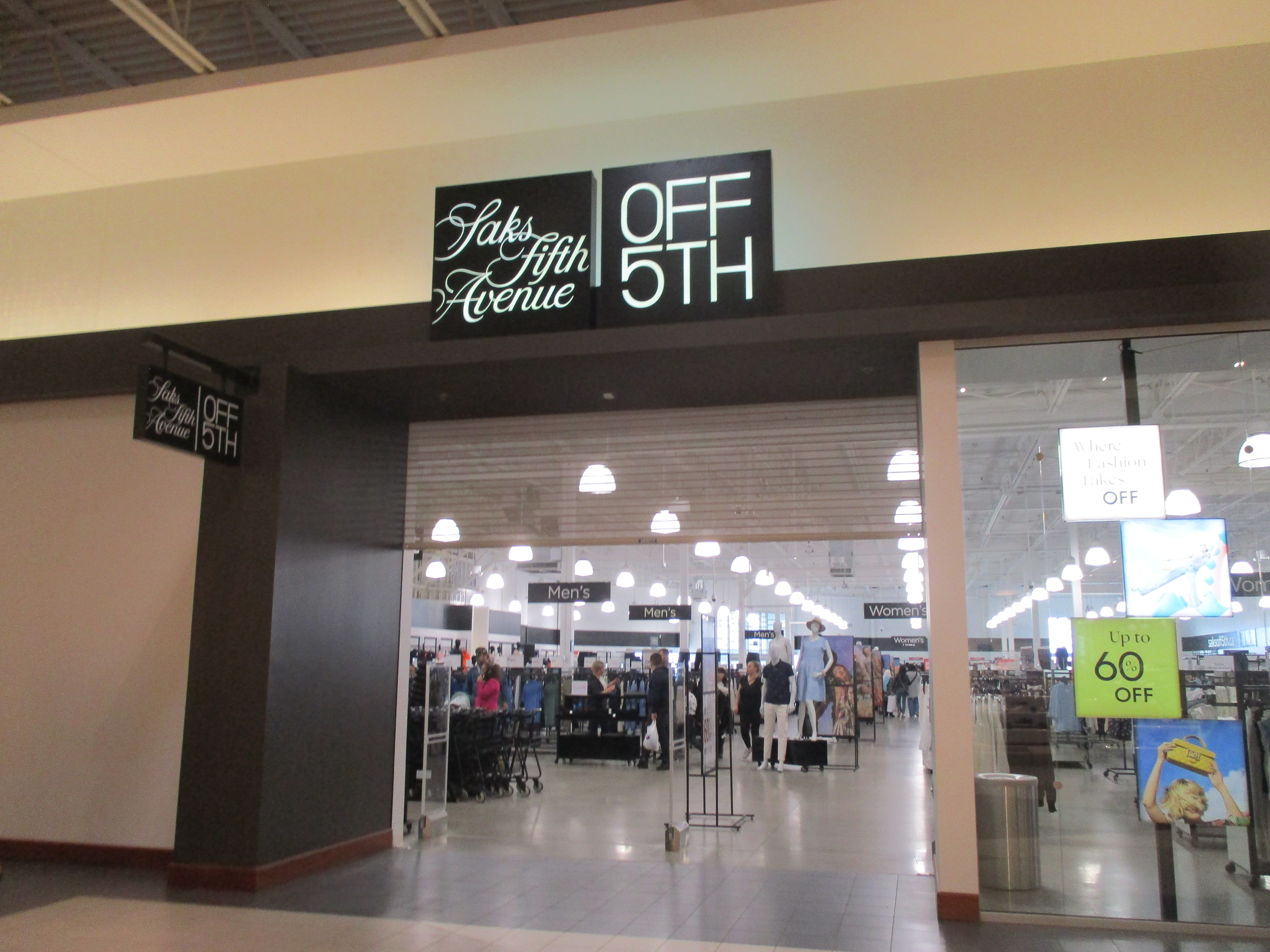
Saks Off 5th (May 2022)

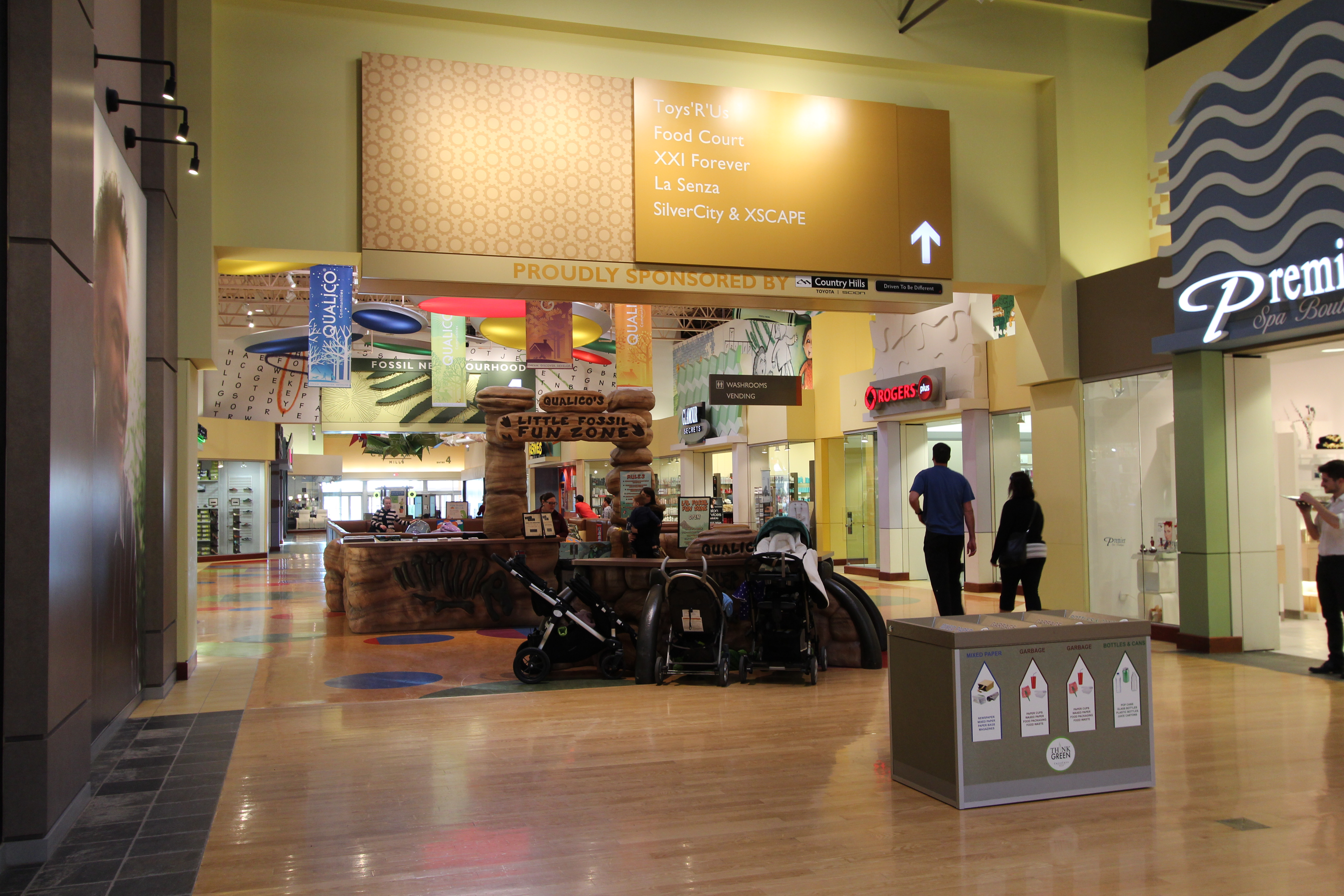
Fossil Neighbourhood wing (April 2014)

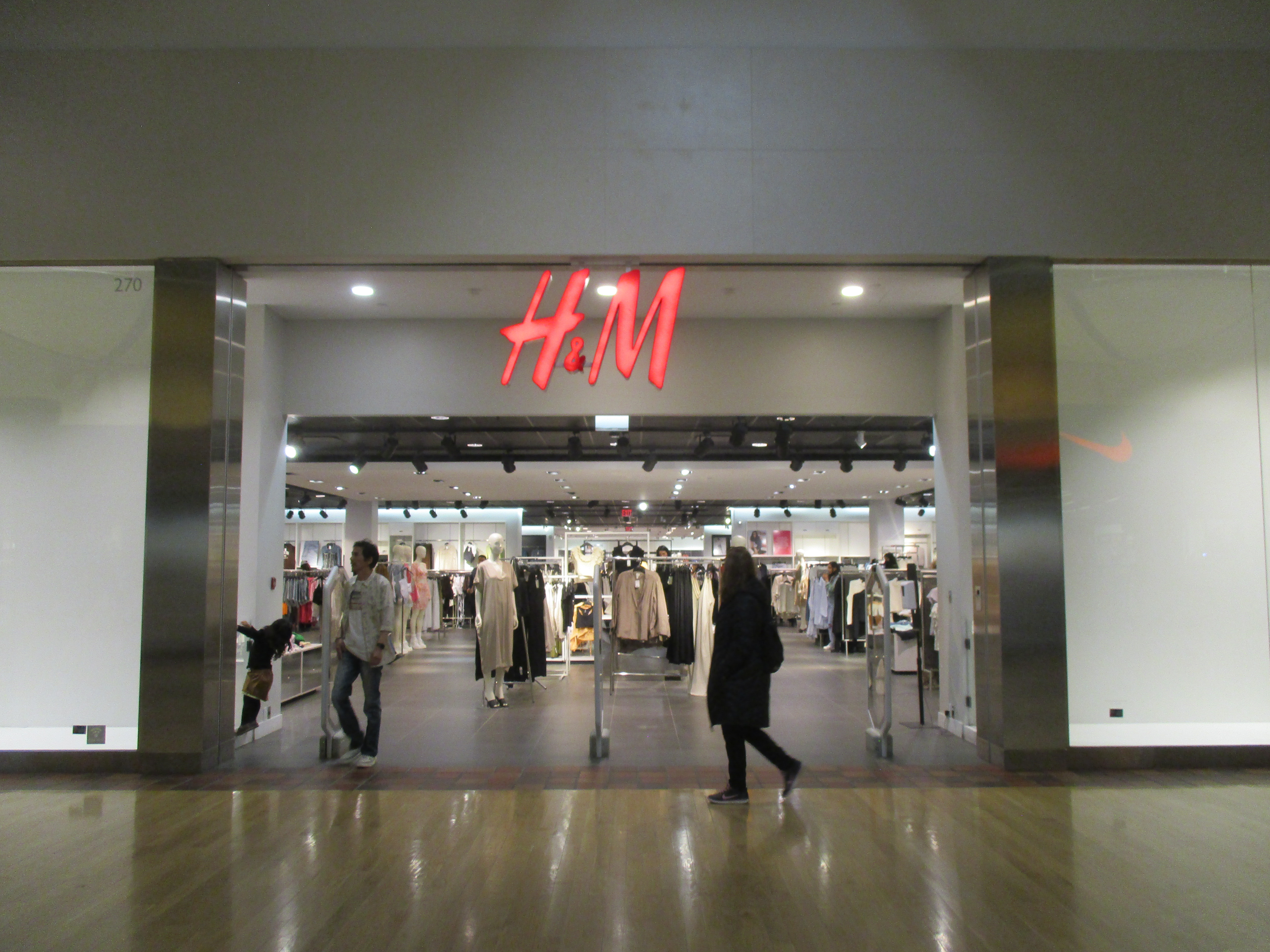
H&M (May 2022)

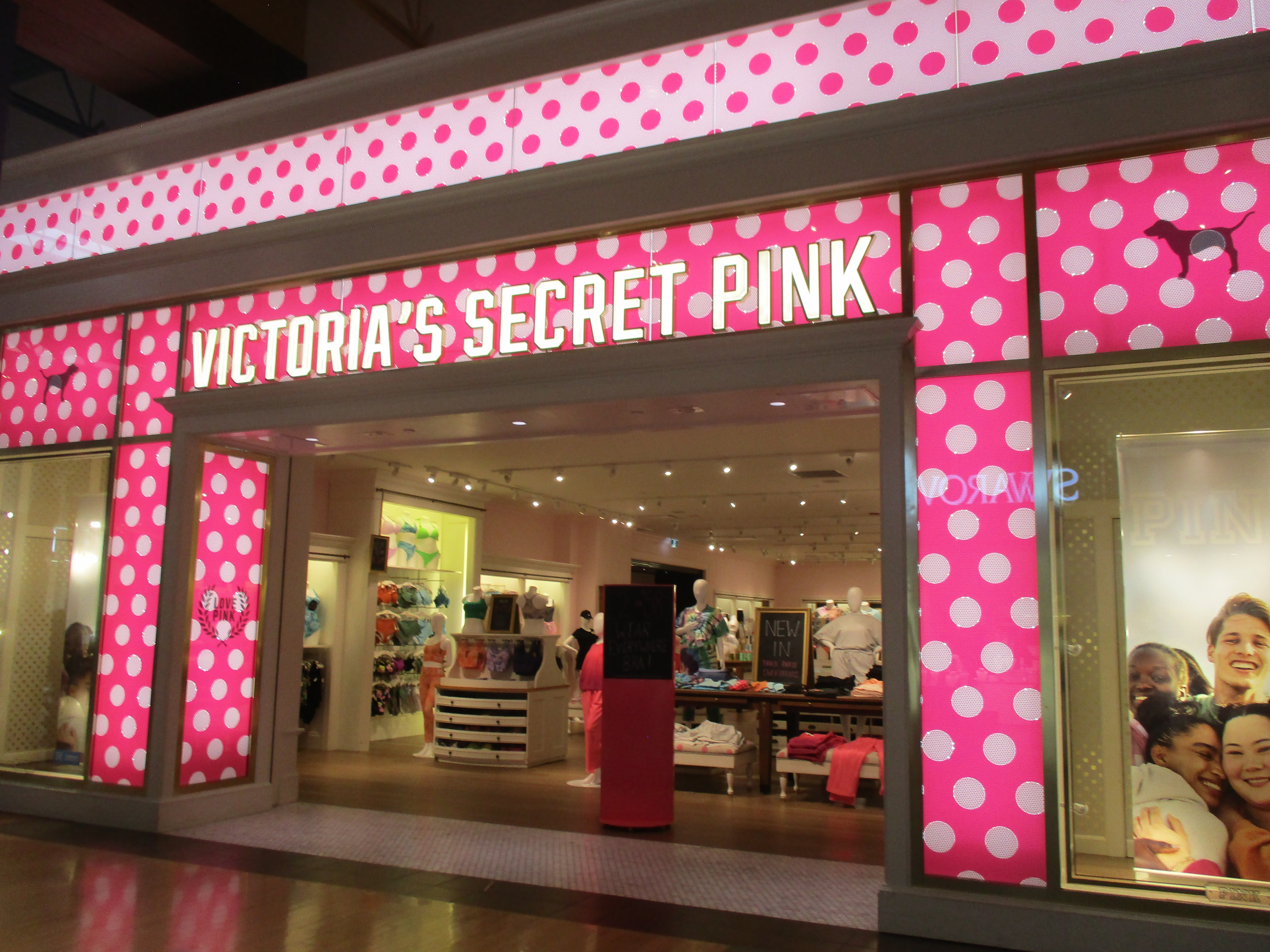
Victoria's Secret PINK (May 2022)

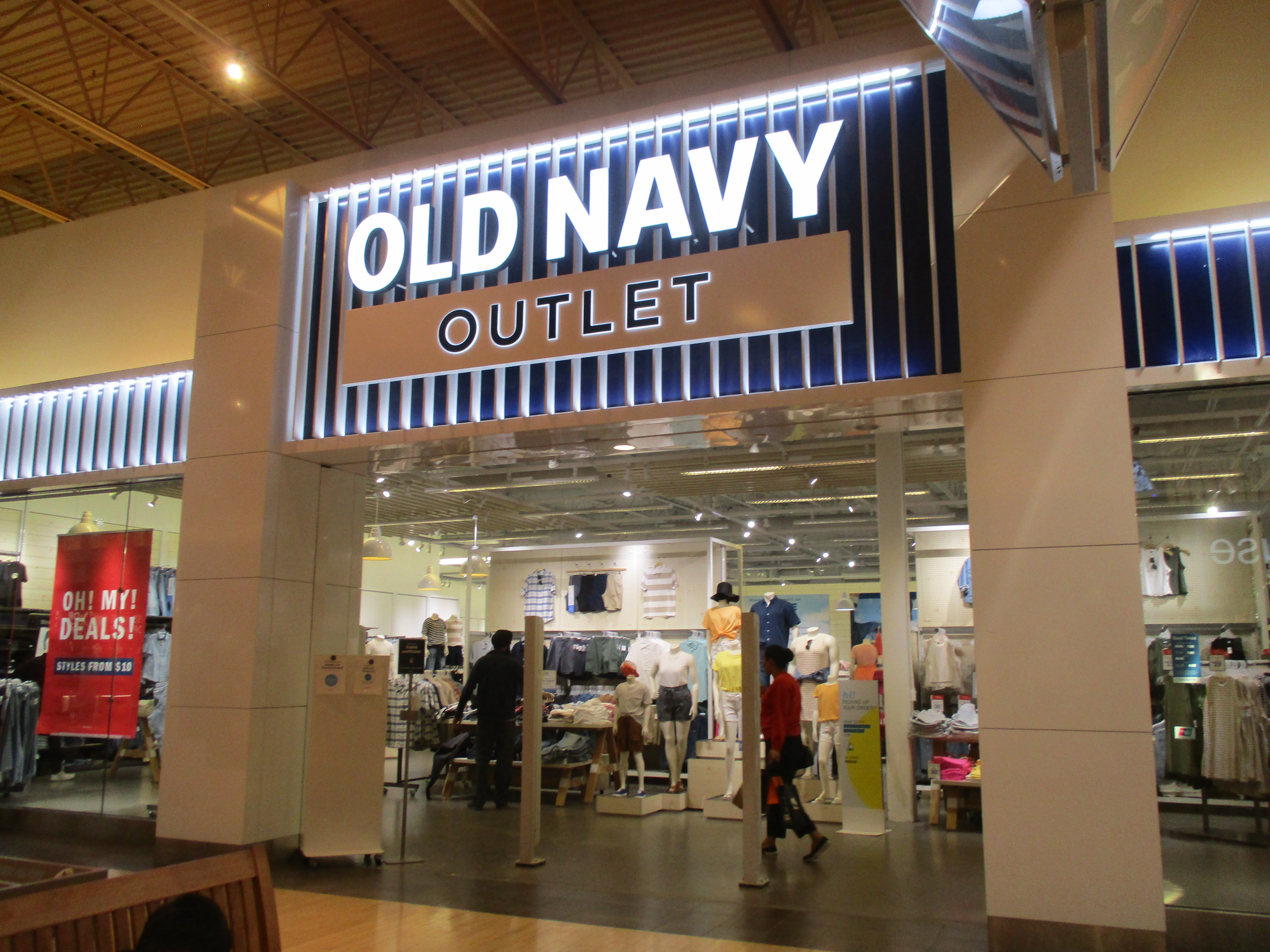
Old Navy Outlet (May 2022)

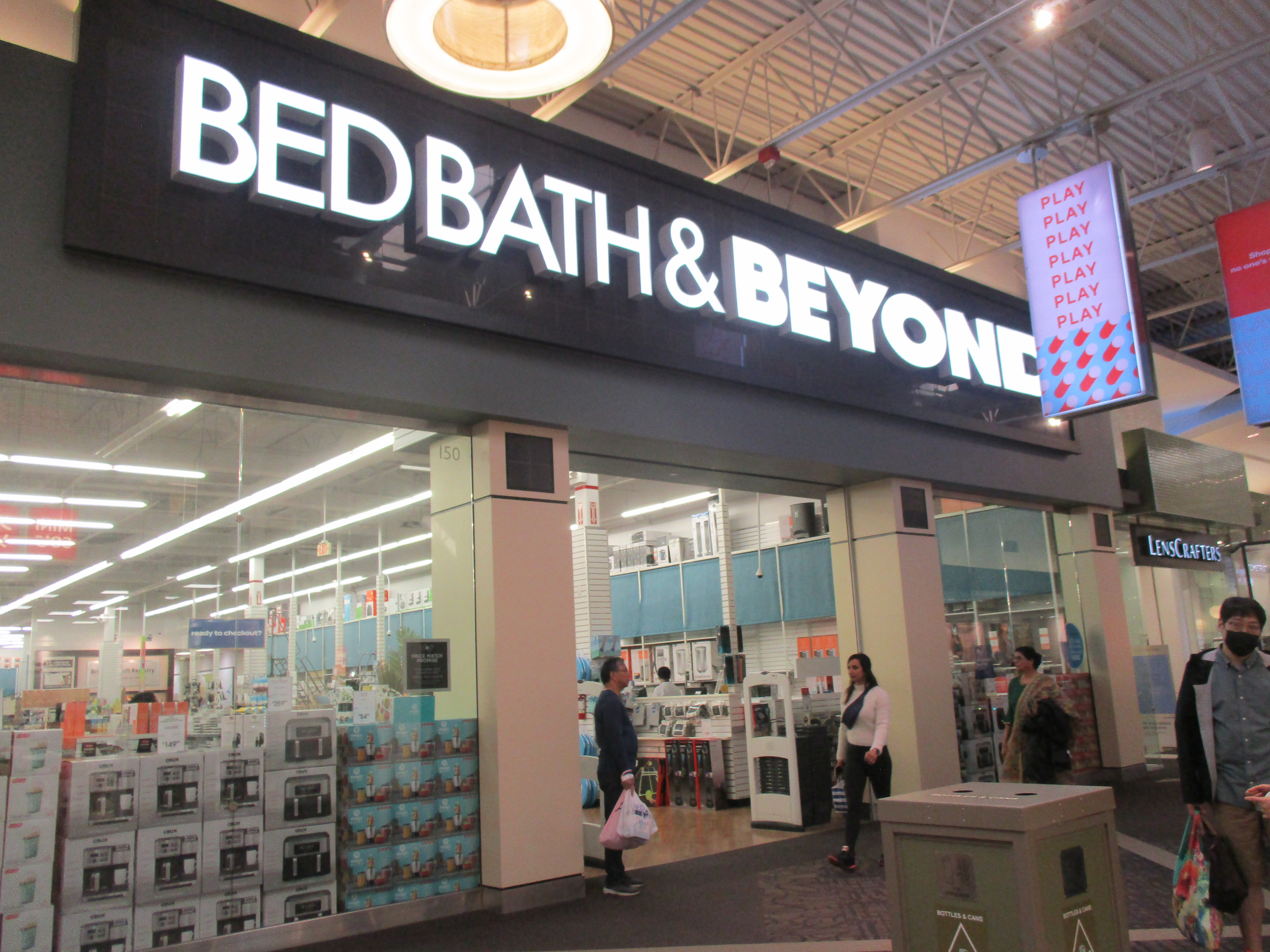
Bed Bath & Beyond (May 2022)

== See also ==
- Tsawwassen Mills
- Premium Outlet Collection EIA
- West Edmonton Mall
- Outlet Collection Winnipeg
- Canada's largest shopping malls
- Arundel Mills, which also features an adjacent casino (Live! Casino & Hotel Maryland)
