= Artsana =

Italian multinational

Artsana Group
- Type: Joint-stock company
- Industry: Healthcare
- Founded: 1946; 80 years ago
- Headquarters: Grandate, Lombardy, Italy
- Area served: Worldwide
- Key people: Alberto Rivolta CEO
- Products: infant care products and healthcare products
- Brands: Chicco, Prénatal, Pic Solution, Lycia, Control
- Revenue: 1,3 billion Euros (2023)
- Website: artsana.com

Artsana Group is an Italian company founded in 1946 by Pietro Catelli as a commercial enterprise specializing in venipuncture and medical supplies. The company remains active today, focusing on the distribution of healthcare and infant care products. Artsana is also known for manufacturing children's products.

== Brands and Products ==
Since 1958, Artsana has produced infant care products under the Chicco brand, which also includes toys. In 1987, the company voluntarily recalled its Pram Mobiles toy in the United States due to a potential strangulation hazard, though no injuries were reported. Other notable toys include the Lullaby Play Gym, produced in collaboration with the Lerado company.

Artsana also manufactures Pic Solution hypodermic syringes, as well as Control brand condoms, lubricants, and sex toys. The company acquired the Prénatal brand in 1996, further expanding its presence in the infant and maternity sector.

Artsana operates in major international markets, with locally established subsidiaries. In the United States, it is represented by Artsana of America, Inc. Since 2018, the company has marketed Recaro Kids products under license.

== Global Presence and Operations ==
The company's headquarters is located in Grandate, near Como, Italy, where its main manufacturing facilities are based. Artsana Group has 21 subsidiaries worldwide, including 12 in Europe, and operates six production facilities within the European Union. The company also sources some of its products from China. One of its suppliers, the Zhili Company, manufactured toys for Chicco. Following a fire at a Zhili toy factory, Artsana agreed to pay $180,000 in compensation to victims.

Including all dealerships and distributors, Artsana's brands are present in over 100 countries. Its direct and franchised retail network for Chicco and Prénatal consists of approximately 400 stores.

The company operates in two main business areas: Baby Care and Health Care. In 2015, these divisions accounted for 87% and 13% of the company’s €1.42 billion turnover, respectively.

== Corporate Social Responsibility ==
In 2012, Artsana launched the Help with PiC initiative under the PiC Solution brand as part of its Corporate Social Responsibility efforts.

In Italy, Chicco supports the Ai.Bi. Association – Amici dei Bambini – through the Seeds of Happiness for Special Children project. Internationally, the Mission Bambini Foundation has engaged Artsana’s key branches (F, UK, B, CH, D, AR, RU, USA, ES) in the Happiness Goes from Heart to Heart project since 2013.

== Community Contributions ==
As a tribute to its founder, Cavaliere del Lavoro Pietro Catelli, Artsana has supported the establishment of:

- A nursery school, Il Villaggio dei Bambini, for the children of Artsana employees in Grandate and neighboring municipalities.
- A preschool, Filomena Saldarini Catelli.
- The Toy Horse Museum.
- A nursery school for children of employees at St. Anna's Hospital in Como.
