= Bórk =

- Hamlet
- Location within Pomeranian Voivodeship Location within Poland
- Coordinates: 54°01′54″N 17°25′58″E
- Country: Poland
- Voivodeship: Pomeranian
- County: Bytów
- Gmina: Lipnica
- Time zone: UTC+1 (CET)
  - Summer (DST): UTC+2 (CEST)
- Postal code: 77-130
- Area code: +48 59
- Vehicle registration: GBY
- Climate: Cfb

Bórk (Polish: [ˈburk]; Kashubian: Bòrk, [ˈbwɛrk]) is a hamlet in the Pomeranian Voivodeship, Poland, located within the municipality of Lipnica in Bytów County.
