= Fedyakovo =

Fedyakovo (Russian: Федяково) is the name of several rural localities in Russia:

- Fedyakovo, Nizhny Novgorod Oblast, a selo in Nizhny Novgorod Oblast
- Fedyakovo, Pskov Oblast, a village in Pskov Oblast
- Fedyakovo, name of several other rural localities
