= Bork (surname) =

Bork is a surname. Notable people with the surname include:

- Detlev Bork (born 1967), German classical and flamenco guitarist
- Erik Bork, American screenwriter and producer
- Frank Bork (born 1940), American baseball pitcher
- George Bork (1942–2026), American football player
- Kennard Baker Bork (born 1940), American geologist
- Max Bork (1899–1973), Generalleutnant in the Wehrmacht during World War II
- Peer Bork (1963–2026), German bioinformatician
- Robert Bork (1927–2012), American legal scholar and rejected Supreme Court nominee
