= Chicco =

Italian manufacturer of children's clothing and toys

- Company type: Subsidiary
- Industry: Toys, baby gear, baby bottles
- Founded: 1958; 68 years ago
- Headquarters: Como, Lombardy, Italy
- Parent: Artsana
- Website: www.chicco.com

Chicco (Italian pronunciation: [ˈkikko]) is an Italian manufacturer of children's clothing, toys and childcare products, with retail outlets worldwide. The company manufactures in Italy and China. Founded in 1958 in Como, Italy, Chicco is now owned by Artsana and operates in more than 120 countries.

== History ==
Chicco was founded in 1958 by Pietro Catelli to celebrate the birth of his first son, Enrico, affectionately nicknamed "Chicco". After Catelli's death in 2006, leadership passed to his three children- Enrico, Michele and Francesca, who oversaw expansion into India, Russia, Mexico and Poland. Claudio De Conto has served as Managing Director since May 2013.

== Products and research ==
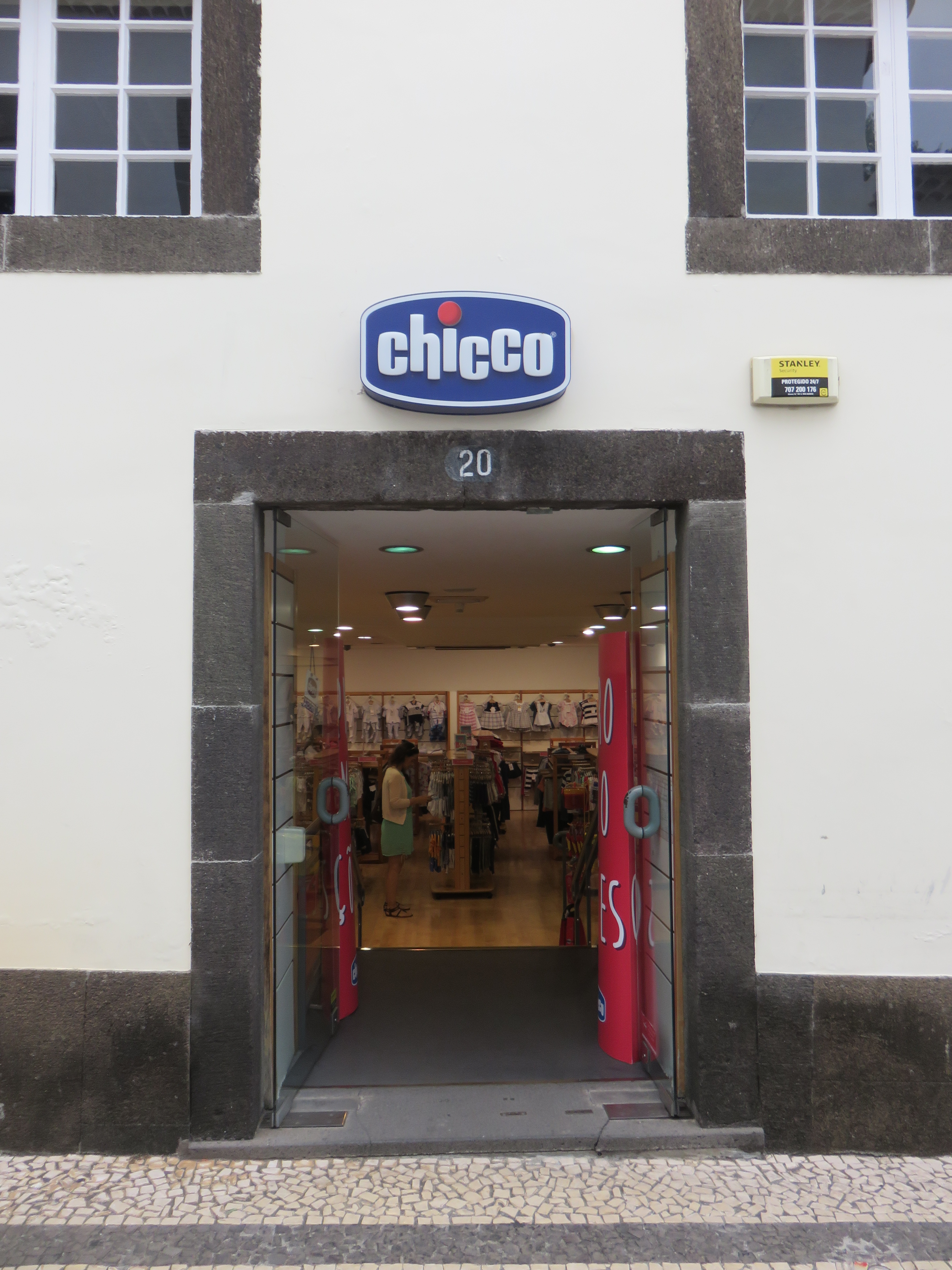
Chicco shop at the ground floor of Palácio dos Ornelas, in Funchal, Madeira Island

Chicco operated in over 120 countries with more than 150 stores in Italy and around 160 internationally. Its product range includes maternity items for pregnancy and breastfeeding, early baby food solutions, hygiene and protection products, travel gear, sleep aids, toys, clothing, and footwear.

Research and development is led by the Baby Research Center, dedicated to the psycho-physical. emotions and social needs of children aged 0 to 3. The centre collaborates with medical-scientific experts and maintains close contact with parents. Chicco has also released its "Baby Moments" product line formulated without Polyphenoxyethanol.

== Social commitment ==
Chicco has partnered with Ai.Bi. Associazione Amici dei Bambini since 2003. In 2010, the "Chicco di Felicità" charity initiative was launched, with proceeds supporting the "Chicco di Felicità per bimbi speciali" project, which promotes the adoption of children with special needs.

Since its launch, Chicco di Felicità has attracted more than 300,000 supporters who have purchased the charm for personal use or as a gift. The charm has been interpreted and customised in various forms by numerous brands and designers, each contributing a distinct and creative approach. It is available in all Chicco stores in Italy.

Since 2013, Chicco has also supported the Mission Bambini Foundation at the international level through financial contributions aimed at funding medical care and interventions for children with heart conditions, as well as training programs for local doctors, under the project "Happiness goes from heart-to-heart". Members of the Group's management team have also participated in humanitarian missions.
