= M.video =

Russian retail network of consumer electronics

PJSC "M.video"
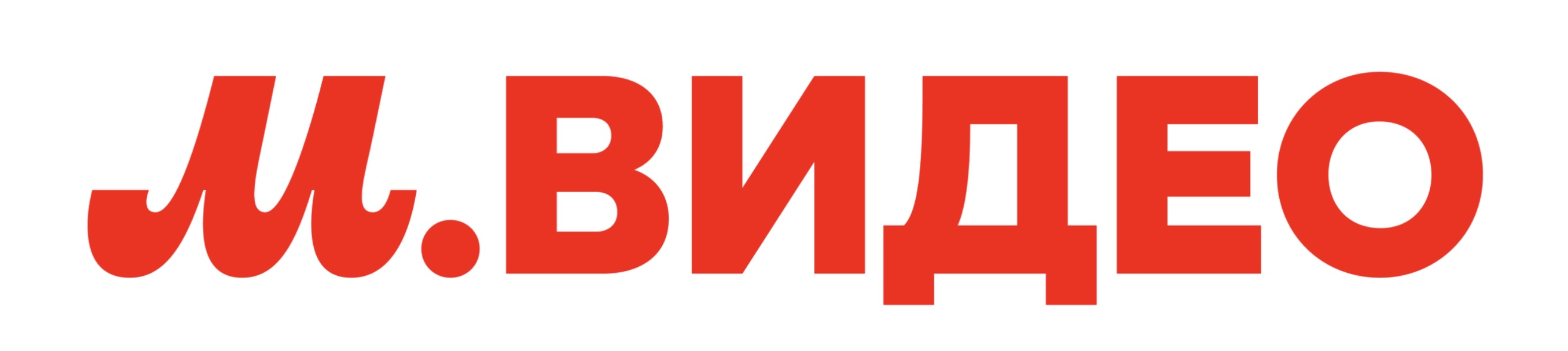
- Native name: ПАО "М.видео"
- Company type: Public (PAO)
- Traded as: MCX: MVID
- Industry: Retail
- Founded: 1993
- Founders: Alexander Tynkovan Mikhail Tynkovan Pavel Breev
- Headquarters: Moscow, Russia
- Products: Consumer electronics
- Revenue: 452 billion (2024)
- Operating income: 11,950,000,000 Russian ruble (2024)
- Net income: −20,121,000,000 Russian ruble (2024)
- Total assets: 367,451,000,000 Russian ruble (2024)
- Website: www.mvideoeldorado.ru

PJSC M.video (М.видео, M.Video-Eldorado Group) is a leading Russian e-commerce and consumer electronic retailer that unites the M.Video and Eldorado brands.

== Overview ==
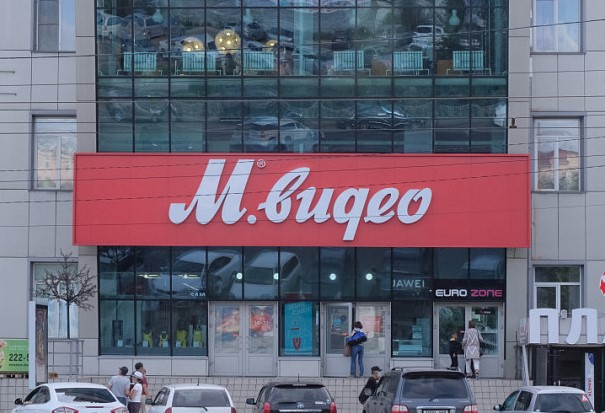
M.Video store in Ulan-Ude, Buryatia

M.Video-Eldorado Group operates a network of more than 1,200 stores in 370 Russian cities from the Kaliningrad Region to Kamchatka and develops its own marketplace of consumer electronics, which provides a wide assortment and quick availability of goods throughout the country. The Group includes the IT company "M.Tech", focused on the development of retail and e-commerce solutions, and the largest fintech platform in Russia in terms of loans issued "Direct Credit". It is the only Russian company in the retail electronics with shares traded on the stock market. Currently, the Company’s shares are traded on the largest Russian stock exchange – Moscow Exchange. (ticker: MVID) In 2022, the company's revenue amounted to 227 million rubles.

== History ==
The company started its operations in 1993 in Moscow. In November 2007, M.video became a public company via an initial public offering. In 2018 M.Video completed a deal to acquire 100% of Eldorado LLC for RUB 45.5 billion (excluding the value of net liabilities). And in the same year M.Video-Eldorado Group continued to consolidate the market, completing a deal to acquire the Russian business of MediaMarktSaturn. MediaMarktSaturn acquires a 15% stake in PJSC M.Video from the SAFMAR Group.

In 2021, M.Video acquired the online lending platform Direct Credit. In 2022, the company's revenue dropped 14% as international sanctions on Russia created inventory shortages and lowered sales.

== Owners and management ==
The controlling shareholder of M.Video "with a share of 53.633 % through a number of companies, including MKOO "Erikaria" is the ex-CEO of the company Bilan Uzhakhov. 15.0% of the shares belong to Media Saturn Holding GMBH, which received this share as part of the acquisition of the company "M.Video-Eldorado " of the MediaMarkt chain of Russian stores. 24.2 % of shares are in free circulation for a year (stock ticker MVID on the Moscow Exchange), 13.5% of which were sold as part of the secondary share placement procedure in March 2021.

In early November 2007, the company's IPO was completed, during which the owners sold its shares in the amount of $364.875 million. The retailer's capitalization following the placement totaled $1.25 billion. As of the end of August 2021, the capitalization of PJSC " MVideo " is 113.5 billion rubles ($1.5 billion).

In May 2017, Mikhail Gutseriev's Safmar Group bought a 57.7 % stake in M.Video" from its founders. In 2019, 73.5% of the shares were owned directly by Said Gutseriev, in 2020, 10% of the shares passed under the control of his holding "EsEfAi", which was separated from the Safmar group. On July 24, 2024, the General Director of PJSC "M" became the majority shareholder of the retailer.Video", Mikhail Gutseriev's nephew Bilan Uzhakhov.

In March 2016, the former president of Svyaznoy, Michael Touch, was appointed to the position of Chief Executive Officer (CEO) of M. Video, reporting directly to Alexander Tynkovan. On August 9, 2016, Michael Touch left the company, and Enrique Fernandez, who had previously served as M's Commercial Director for 7 years, took over as CEO.Video". In September 2020, CEO of the M Group.Video-El Dorado " announced Alexander Izosimov. In January 2022, Enrique Fernandez returned to his former position, and Alexander Izosimov retained the status of a minority shareholder of the company .

In April 2025, Ekaterina Yarina will be appointed Chief Financial Officer of M.Video-El Dorado". Anna Garmanova, who previously held the position of CFO, left the M team.Video-El Dorado" after three years of work in the company . As CFO, Ekaterina Yarina will be responsible for managing all financial activities of the company, including strategic and operational planning, monitoring financial flows, reporting, as well as implementing anti-crisis and transformational initiatives in the financial sector.
