= Bork (company) =

Russian home appliance company

BORK Elektronik GmbH
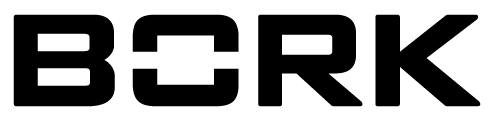
- Company type: Private
- Industry: Home appliances
- Founded: 2001
- Headquarters: Moscow, Russia
- Website: www.bork.ru

Bork is an international Russian company.

Bork's product range includes handcrafted home accessories, innovative beauty and wellness products and Premium household appliances.

== History ==
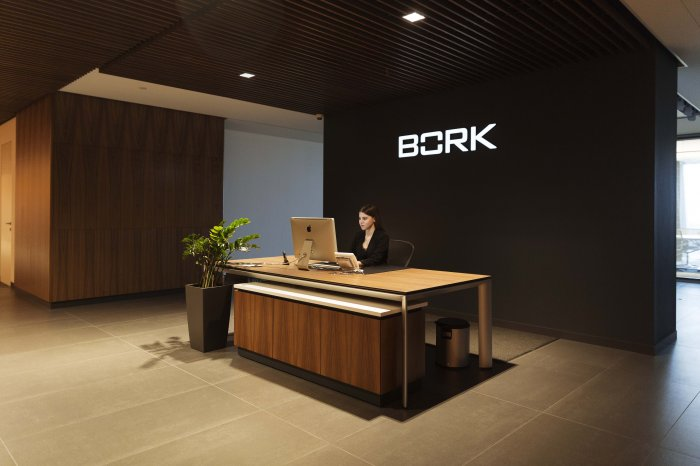
Bork (company)

Bork was founded in 2001 in Germany by Bork Elektronik GmbH. The name refers to the German noun "Borke", which means "bark". Bork’s manufacturing facilities are located worldwide, including Germany, Italy, France, Japan, Korea, among others.

Bork offers a range of more than 50 various product categories of home accessories and household appliances. The first Bork boutique was opened in Moscow in 2007. The full range of products is available through a network of 75 boutiques located in 29 cities in Russia and CIS countries. In February 2024, Bork stepped into the new market and opened its first store in the Middle East in Dubai, United Arab Emirates.

In 2023, Bork Interior was launched – the first collection of furniture designed in Brazil.

== Marketing ==
Bork's marketing strategy is focused on supporting the premium positioning of the product. Bork develops mono-branded stores and boutiques; offers premium customer service including free delivery of products on Mercedes-Benz minivans; uses high-impact billboards for outdoor advertisement; sponsors well-known culinary-entertainment programs on TV ("SMAK" on First Channel, "Eat at Home", "Breakfast with Julia Vysotskaya"). Bork was an official sponsor of the 2006 World Football Championship.

== Awards ==
The international expert community in the field of industrial design has assigned Bork with various awards, such as the RedDot Design Award and iF Design Award.
