= L'Etoile (retailer) =

Russian cosmetics and perfumery retail chain

- Native name: Лэтуаль
- Industry: Cosmetics and perfumes
- Founded: 1997
- Founder: Maxim Klimov
- Key people: Dmitry Sosunov (CEO)

L'Etoile is a Russian retail chain of cosmetics and perfumery stores, founded in 1997.

For 2024, the chain has more than 1,000 stores in 250 cities across Russia, as well as outlets in the CIS countries, Qatar and the UAE.

== History ==
L'Etoile Company was founded in 1997. The first store was opened in Moscow.

In 2001, a system of cumulative discount cards was introduced in L'Etoile stores, giving discounts of 5-25%.

In 2008, the chain had more than 115 stores in Moscow and more than 500 across Russia, covering more than 120 cities.

In 2011, L'Etoile became the leader in the cosmetics and perfumery segment at the INFOLine&Retailer Russia TOP-100 DAY meeting for owners of the Russian retail trade. L'Etoile received a special award for "The most comprehensive implementation of Microsoft Dynamics solutions".

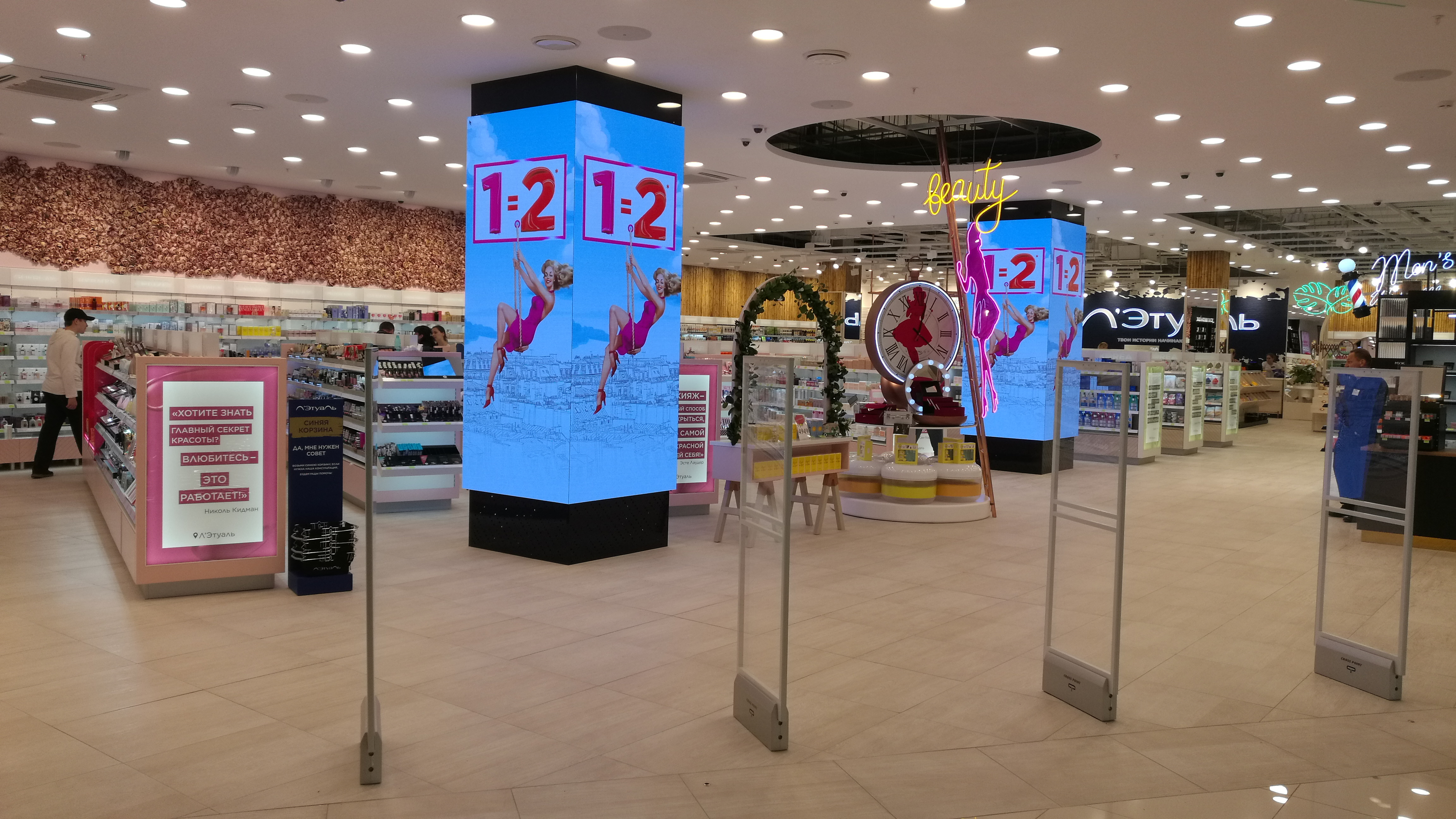
L'Etoile trading hall (2019)

By the end of 2012, L'Etoile was included in the list of the 30 leading retailers in Russia, ranking 17th.

In 2015, the chain had 900 stores in 200 cities. The company had 13,000 employees.

As of 2020, L'Etoile ranked second in terms of revenue as a seller of cosmetics and perfumes in Russia.

In 2022, L'Etoile launched its marketplace based on an online store.

Since 2022, the "Podruzhka" store chain has been owned by L'Etoile.

In 2023, the company carried out a rebranding, updating its logo and slogan. The apostrophe disappeared in the new logo, the letters became the same height, the color was "electric blue", and the wave was preserved.

L'Etoile first entered the Middle East market at the end of 2023. The store first opened in Qatar, followed by stores in Sharjah, Dubai, Ras al Khaimah and Abu Dhabi in the summer of 2024.

By 2024, the L'Etoile chain will have more than 1000 stores in 250 cities in Russia, as well as outlets in the CIS countries, Qatar, and the UAE.

In 2024, L'Etoile won the award for "Best Foreign Retailer Entering the National Market" at the international Global Retail Real Estate Awards.

== Owners and management ==
L'Etoile is owned by Alcor and Co LLC (Russian: ООО «Алькор и Ко»), founded by Maxim Klimov.

Since 2024, Dmitry Sosunov has served as CEO, succeeding Tatiana Volodina, who held the position from 2011.

In 2014, the creative director was John Galliano, former designer for Dior.

== Financial indicators ==
In 2023 revenue amounted to 104.2 billion rubles.

In 2018 revenue was 82.5 billion rubles.

In 2017 – 80 billion rubles.

In 2014, the trade turnover amounted to 73 billion rubles.

In 2012, revenue amounted to 47 billion rubles.
