= Sportmaster =

Russian store

- Native name: Спортмастер
- Company type: LLC
- Founded: 1992
- Founder: Nikolay and Vladimir Fartushnyaks, Alexander Mikhalsky, and Dmitry Doikhen
- Headquarters: Moscow, Russia
- Key people: Leonid Strakhov (CEO)
- Operating income: ▲159,5 billion rubles (2023)
- Net income: ▲23,1 billion rubles (2023)

Sportmaster is a Russian chain of sporting goods and clothing stores, founded in 1992. For 2019 Sportmaster had 495 stores in 230 cities in Russia, Belarus, Ukraine, Kazakhstan and China.

== History ==
In 1992, Nikolay and Vladimir Fartushnyaks, Alexander Mikhalsky, and Dmitry Doikhen founded the Ilion company to supply German Kettler sports simulators to Russia.

In 1995, the first "Kettler-Sport" store was opened in Moscow, where Kettler fitness equipment was sold.

In 1996, Sportmaster was registered as a trademark under which future stores were opened.

In 1997, the Sportmaster Group of companies was founded. In the same year, the first store with the name "Sportmaster" was opened.

In 2003, Sportmaster created the O'STIN casual clothing brand, which became a separate company in 2005.

In 2005, the Ilion company was liquidated, and Sportmaster LLC took its place.

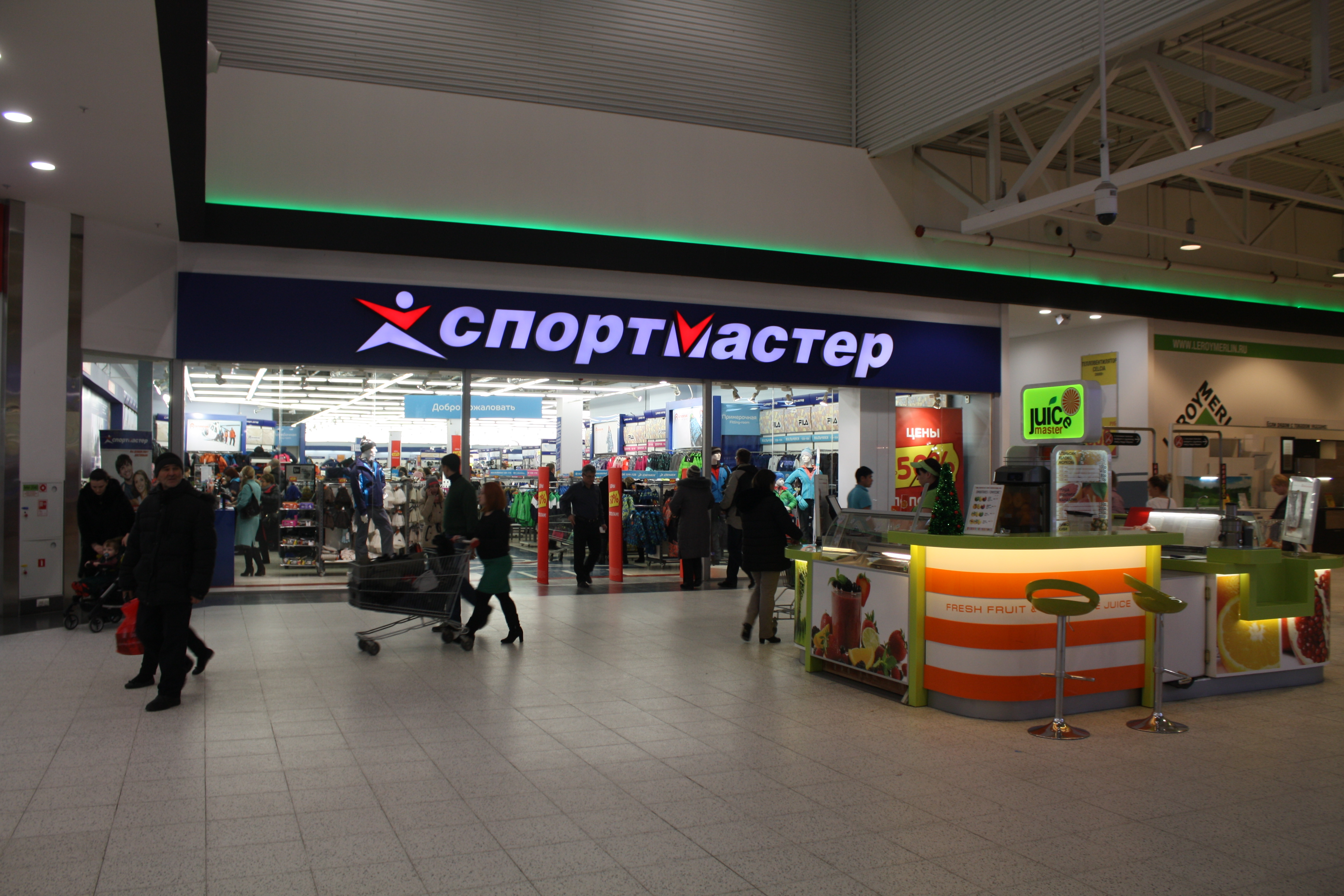
Sportmaster in Mega Family Shopping Centre (2017, Novosibirsk)

By the mid-2000s, Sportmaster had more than 100 stores in Russia.

In 2011, the first Sportmaster store opened in Kazakhstan, and in 2013, another opened in China.

In 2019, Sportmaster had 495 stores in 230 cities across Russia, Belarus, Ukraine, Kazakhstan, and China. The number of employees was 23,000.

In 2023 and 2024 Sportmaster entered the Forbes ranking of the "100 largest companies in Russia by net profit", ranking 68th and 98th respectively.

In 2023, Sportmaster entered the Uzbek market by opening its store in Samarkand.

== Owners and management ==
Founders are Nikolay and Vladimir Fartushnyaks, Alexander Mikhalsky, and Dmitry Doikhen.

Leonid Strakhov has been the General Director in Russia since 2003.

In 2019, Dmitry Doikhen left the business.

At the end of 2022, Sportmaster was owned by Nikolay and Vladimir Fartushnyaks (30.79% each), Alexander Mikhalsky (30.79%), and Leonid Strakhov (7.63%).

== Financial indicators ==
Year	Revenue, billion rubles	Net Income, billion rubles
2012	▲58,1	▲5,4
2013	▲69,1	▼4,4
2014	▲81,1	▼1,8
2015	▲86,8	▲6,9
2016	▲91,9	▲12,3
2017	▲96,2	▲14,7
2018	▲107,4	▲15,6
2019	▲112,4	▼8,4
2020	▼101,8	▲10,3
2021	▲129,1	▲13,6
2022	▲139,6	▲22,9
2023	▲159,5	▲23,1
