= Zolla =

Zolla is a surname. Notable people with this surname include:

- Claudio Zolla (born 1969), Peruvian evangelical pastor, communicator, and businessman
- Elémire Zolla (1926–2002), Italian essayist, philosopher and historian of religion
- Lello Zolla (born 1948), Italian molecular biologist and researcher
- Michele Zolla (1932–2024), Italian government official and politician
