= Popbar =

American dessert chain

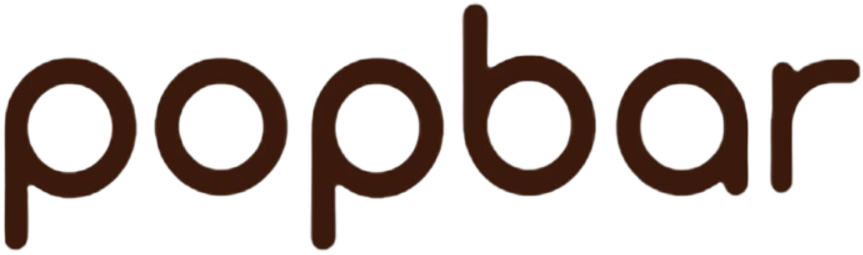

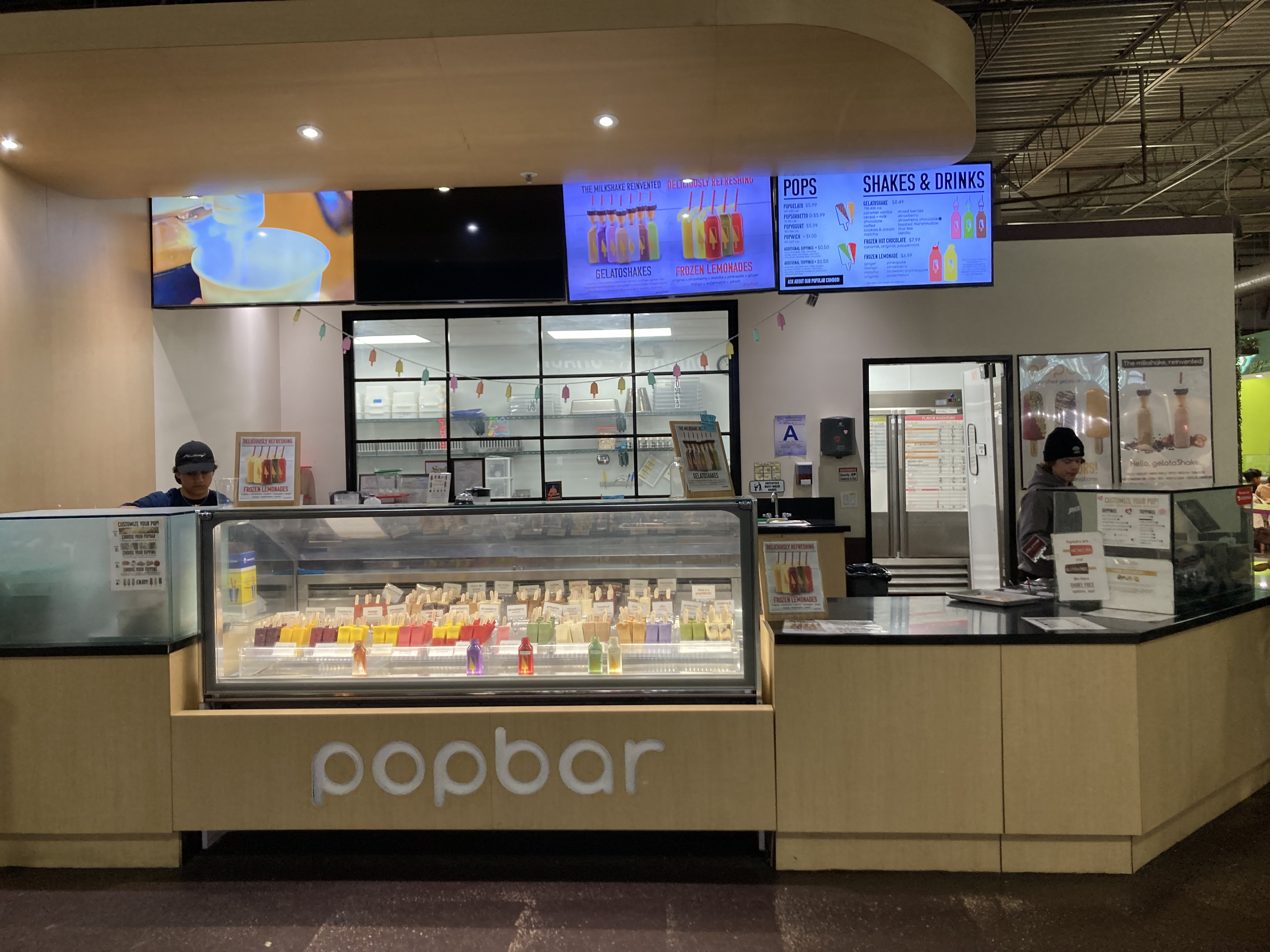
- A location at a food court in Rancho Cucamonga, California
- Company type: Private
- Industry: Foodservice
- Founded: 2010
- Founders: Reuban BenJehuda; Daniel Yaghoubi
- Number of locations: 16 (10 upcoming) (2024)
- Area served: East Coast; California
- Website: www.pop-bar.com

Popbar is an American chain of ice pop restaurants with 16 restaurants primarily based around the East Coast of the United States. It was founded in 2010 and sells gelato on sticks.

== History ==
The chain's first shop opened in 2010, in the West Village neighborhood of New York City. It was founded by Milan-native Reuben BenJehuda and Hamburg-native Daniel Yaghoubi. They were both fans of gelato and wanted to make the dessert customizable. Its first West Coast location was in the Anaheim Packing House in Anaheim, California, opening in May 2014. Its first location outside of North America was opened in Lisbon in Portugal in 2019. In 2020, the company opened a production facility in Midtown Manhattan.

== Menu ==
Popbar exclusively serves desserts. It is known for its popGelato gelato ice pops, which come in 32 flavors, not including 3 vegan ones. The chain also offers yogurt and sorbet varieties. Customers can also choose to dunk their pop in various chocolate dippings. Finally, one can get toppings on their dessert. Other variations on popGelato include the gelatoShake, a milkshake, and hot chocolate on a stick. Normal popbars weigh about 3 oz (85 g), and miniature versions are also sold. They are made in batches of 26.

In 2015, Popbar sold gelato sandwiched between a roll, similar to an ice cream sandwich, as a special seasonal offer exclusively at its New York City location. It partnered with Oscar Mayer in 2022 to release the "Cold Dog", a hot dog-flavored ice pop.

== Locations ==
As of 2024, Popbar has 16 locations in 8 states, 7 of which are on the East Coast. The state with the most locations, however, is the only Western location: California. There are also singular locations in Winnipeg in Canada and Lisbon and Porto in Portugal. Upcoming locations include expansions to the states of South Carolina and Michigan.
