= List of supermarket chains in Serbia =

This is a list of supermarket chains in Serbia.

== General store chains ==
=== Convenience stores ===
Name	Stores	Parent
Gomex	273	Gomex
Idea	261	Alta Retail
Aman	196	Aman
Maxi Go	182	Ahold Delhaize
Jutro	169	Metro AG
Aroma	74	Domaća trgovina
Fortuna Market	11	Fortuna Market
Mix Markt	4	Monolith Group

=== Supermarkets ===
Name	Stores	Parent
Maxi	411	Ahold Delhaize
Univerexport	210	Univerexport
Lidl	86	Schwarz Group
Idea Super	72	Alta Retail
DIS	53	Aman
Roda	32	Alta Retail
MERE	24	Torgservis
Stokomak	6	Stokomak

=== Hypermarkets ===
Name	Stores	Parent
Mega Maxi	12	Ahold Delhaize
Super Vero	7	Veropoulos
Roda Mega	6	Alta Retail
Mercator	2	Alta Retail

=== Cash and Carry ===
Name	Stores	Parent
METRO Cash and Carry	9	Metro AG
Velpro	8	Alta Retail
Plus Cash and Carry	2	Plus Cash and Carry

== Speciality store chains ==
=== Clothing ===
Name	Stores	First store	Parent
Pepco	221	2020	Pepco
Sinsay	69	2017	LPP
P.S. Fashion	64	2006	P.S. Fashion
Extreme Intimo	60	1992	Extreme Intimo
Legend	48	1998	Eminent
Deichmann	33	2011	Deichmann
NewYorker	28	2007	NewYorker
LC Waikiki	25	2014	LC Waikiki
Women'secret	20	2004	Tendam
Tom Tailor	19	2012	Tom Tailor
Springfield	19	2008	Tendam
H&M	18	2013	H&M
Fashion&friends	14	2007	Fashion&friends
Hugo Boss	9	2011	Hugo Boss
Cropp	9	2017	LPP
Reserved	7	2017	LPP
House	7	2017	LPP
Benetton	7	2002	Benetton
Bershka	7	2009	Inditex
Lacoste	7	2001	Lacoste S.A.
Zara	6	2004	Inditex
Pull and Bear	6	2009	Inditex
Koton	6	2010	Koton
Levi's	6	2001	Levi Strauss & Co.
Timberland	6	2007	Timberland
Guess	5	2007	Guess Inc.
Tommy Hilfiger	5	2006	Tommy Hilfiger
Replay	5	2007	Replay
Lindex	5	2012	Lindex Group plc
Stradivarius	4	2009	Inditex
Calvin Klein	4	2010	Calvin Klein
Superdry	4	2017	Superdry
U.S. Polo Assn.	4	2014	USPA
Massimo Dutti	3	2009	Inditex
Oysho	3	2012	Inditex
Steve Madden	3	2018	Steve Madden
Max Mara	2	2015	Max Mara
Victoria's Secret	3	2016	L Brands
Peek & Cloppenburg	2	2020	Peek & Cloppenburg
Diesel	1	2014	Diesel
Liu Jo	1	2018	Liu Jo
Camper	1	2013	Camper
Scotch & Soda	1	2015	Scotch & Soda

=== Kids clothing and toys ===
Name	Stores	First store	Parent
Ciciban	64	1922	Planika
Dexy Co	46	1996	Dexy Co
Bebakids	34	1989	Bebakids
Pertini Toys	27	1990	Pertini Toys
Jumbo	6	2016	Jumbo
OVS kids	6	2013	OVS
Sergent major	3	2009	Sergent major
Kockarium	2	2017	Kockarium
Lego Store	1	2017	Bravo Store Adria

=== Cosmetics and healthcare ===
Name	Stores	First store	Parent
BENU	451	2010	Phoenix Pharmahandel
Lilly	252	2006	Lilly drogerie
DM	132	2004	DM
Jasmin	27	1956	Jasmin parfimerije
The Body Shop	11	2019	Natura & Co
KIKO	9	2021	KIKO Milano
Sephora	5	2010	LVMH
L'Occitane en Provence	5	2012	L'occitane
Kiehl's	4	2019	L'Oréal
Yves Rocher	1	2008	Yves Rocher
Lush	1	2020	Lush

=== Home improvement and furniture ===
Name	Stores	First store	Parent
JYSK	47	2011	JYSK
Forma Ideale	44	2001	Forma Ideale
Woby Haus	41	1994	Woby Haus
Matis	30	2003	Matis
SIMPO	27	1978	SIMPO
Uradi Sam	16	2003	Uradi Sam
Dallas	6	2004	Dallas Nameštaj
Emmezeta	5	2015	Steinhoff
Zara Home	3	2016	Inditex
Lesnina XXXL	2	2019	XXXLutz
IKEA	2	2017	IKEA
Mömax	1	2024	Mömax
Würth	1	2021	Würth

=== Consumer electronics ===
Name	Stores	First store	Parent
Tehnomedia	83	2001	Tehnomedia
Gigatron	74	2003	Bidigital
Tehnomanija	69	1999	Tehnomanija
Xiaomi	7	2021	Xiaomi
Samsung	4	2012	Samsung
Istyle	4	2007	Istyle
Pixelshop	2	2025	Pixelshop
Dr Techno	8	2013	Dr Techno

=== Sports equipment ===
Name	Stores	First store	Parent
Planeta sport	118	2014	Planeta sport
Đak sport	65	1998	Đak sport
Sport Vision	53	1996	Sport Vision
Beosport	30	2005	Beosport
Extra Sports	29	1996	Sport Vision
Intersport	27	2002	Intersport
BUZZ	23	1996	Sport Vision
Skechers	9	2019	Skechers
Adidas	6	2004	Adidas
Decathlon	6	2019	Decathlon
Salomon	1	2024	Salomon Group

=== Books and media ===
Name	Stores	First store	Parent
Delfi	50	1998	Laguna
Vulkan	30	2010	Vulkan

=== Petrol stations ===
Name	Stores	First store	Parent
NIS Petrol	298	1949	Gazprom
Lukoil	114	2003	Lukoil
Knez Petrol	111	2000	Knez Petrol
MOL	71	2004	MOL
OMV	63	2001	OMV
EKO	55	2002	HelleniQ Energy
Gazprom Petrol	28	2012	Gazprom
Petrol	21	1947	Petrol
Shell	12	2018	Shell

=== Fast food ===
Name	Stores	First store	Parent
McDonald's	42	1988	McDonald's
KFC	21	2006	Yum! Brands
Richard Gyros	12	2018	Richard Gyros
Starbucks	9	2019	Starbucks
Dodo Pizza	4	2026	Dodo Pizza
Burger King	2	2026	Nomberg
Taco Bell	2	2025	Yum! Brands

== See also ==
- List of shopping malls in Serbia
