= Delhaize Serbia =

Serbian supermarket chain owned by Ahold Delhaize

- Official logo
- Type: d.o.o.
- Industry: Retail
- Predecessor: Delta Maxi Group
- Founded: 30 July 2004; 22 years ago (Current form); 2000; 26 years ago (Founded)
- Headquarters: Jurija Gagarina 14, Belgrade, Serbia
- Number of locations: 482 stores (June 2022)
- Area served: Serbia
- Key people: Gorica Jovović (Director)
- Products: Supermarket
- Brands: Maxi, Mega Maxi, Shop&Go
- Services: Discount stores, hypermarket, supercenter, supermarket, superstore, other specialty
- Revenue: ▲€1.467 billion (2025)
- Operating income: ▲€91.6 million (2023)
- Net income: ▲€66.12 million (2023)
- Total assets: ▲€960.91 million (2025)
- Total equity: ▲€413.85 million (2025)
- Owner: Lion Retail Holdings (100%)
- Number of employees: 11,994 (2025)
- Parent: Ahold Delhaize
- Subsidiaries: TP Srbija d.o.o.
- Website: karijera.delhaizeserbia.rs
- Footnotes; Business ID: 17569171; Tax ID: 103482850

Delhaize Serbia (full legal name: Delhaize Serbia d.o.o. Beograd) is a Serbian retail company owned by Ahold Delhaize, with headquarters in Belgrade. Founded in 2000, the chain has around 482 stores in Serbia. As of 2016, it has 20.60% market share in Serbia.

== History ==
In Serbia, Maxi became the biggest retail company by acquiring companies C-market and Pekabeta. In March 2011, Delhaize Group (now Ahold Delhaize) bought the Maxi supermarket chain from Serbian Delta Holding for a sum of 932.5 million euros.

Since 2013, Maxi and Tempo are no longer operating in Montenegro.

Since 2014, Maxi and Tempo are no longer operating in Bosnia and Herzegovina. The company "Tropic Group" from Banja Luka bought the ownership of 39 retail supermarkets (Tempo, Maxi) from "Delhaize BiH".

=== Allegations of price fixing ===
On October 10, the Commission for Protection of Competition launched an investigation against Delhaize Serbia, Mercator S, Univerexport, and DIS for violating competition in the market by entering into a restrictive agreement, specifically by agreeing on identical prices for certain products.

The Commission monitored price movements for 35 selected products from late April 2024 to September 19, 2024 in these four retail chains. The prices were found to be virtually identical or very similar across different retailers, including during promotional periods.

Belgrade Higher Public Prosecutor’s Office formed a case on 15 October 2024 after receiving Commission’s report and issued requests to the Market Inspection Sector of the Ministry of Internal and Foreign Trade for data spanning 2016-2024 regarding pricing, supply chains, and anti-competitive behaviour.

Governor of the National Bank of Serbia Jorgovanka Tabaković stated that the company Delhaize had allegedly simulated a liquidation procedure in order to transfer €130 million in profit out of Serbia without paying taxes.

== Locations ==
=== Serbia ===
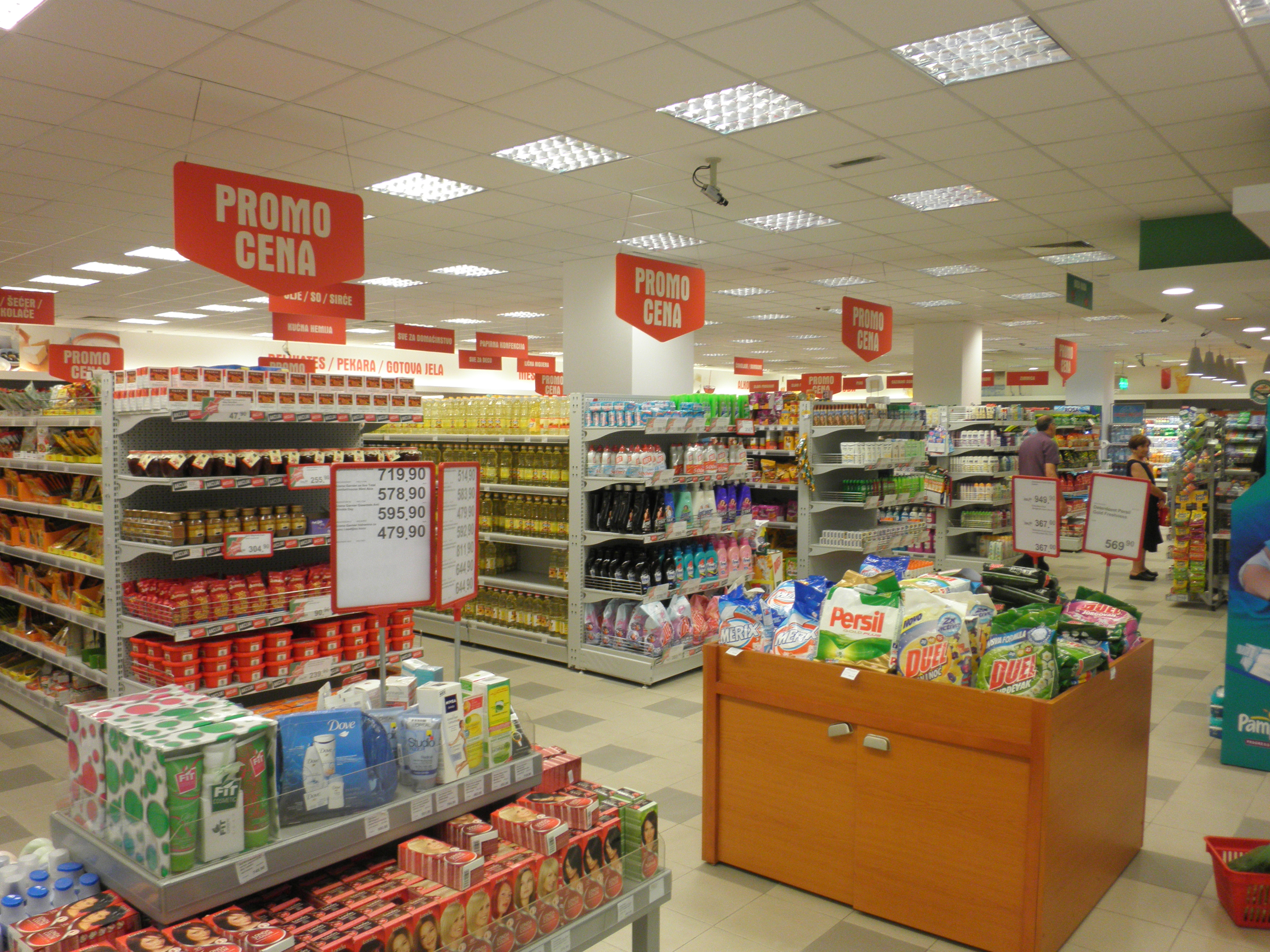
Maxi in Niš

Maxi is expanding quickly across Serbia, and plans to have a chain in the entire Balkan region. Some current locations are in the following cities:

Maxi supermarket:

- Apatin
- Aranđelovac
- Aleksandrovac
- Arilje
- Belgrade
- Bor
- Bogatić
- Bujanovac
- Čačak
- Gornji Milanovac
- Jagodina
- Kikinda
- Kovačica
- Kragujevac
- Kruševac
- Niš
- Novi Banovci
- Novi Pazar
- Novi Sad
- Pančevo
- Paraćin
- Pirot
- Priboj
- Požarevac
- Ruma
- Šabac
- Smederevo
- Smederevska Palanka
- Sombor
- Sremska Mitrovica
- Subotica
- Topola
- Užice
- Velika Plana
- Vranje
- Vrbas
- Vršac
- Zaječar
- Zrenjanin
- Zlatibor

Maxi Shop&Go:

- Aranđelovac
- Barajevo
- Bečmen
- Beograd
- Brus
- Dobanovci
- Ivanjica
- Jagodina
- Kačarevo
- Kopaonik
- Kragujevac
- Kraljevo
- Mladenovac
- Mrčajevci
- Niš
- Nova Pazova
- Novi Banovci
- Novi Pazar
- Novi Sad
- Omoljica
- Pančevo
- Požega
- Raška
- Smederevo
- Sremska Kamenica
- Šabac
- Ugrinovci
- Valjevo
- Vranje
- Zrenjanin

Tempo Centar:

- Beograd
- Čačak
- Kragujevac (Delta Park)
- Kraljevo
- Niš
- Novi Sad
- Užice

Tempo Express:

- Beograd
- Ćuprija
- Kragujevac
- Kruševac
- Loznica
- Niš
- Novi Sad
- Pančevo
- Požarevac
- Subotica
- Vrnjačka Banja

== See also ==
- List of supermarket chains in Serbia
- Ahold Delhaize
- Mega Maxi - the cash and carry/hypermarket version of Maxi
