= Reserved =

Clothing retailer based in Gdańsk

- Industry: Retailer
- Founded: 1999; 27 years ago Gdańsk, Poland
- Founders: Marek Piechocki; Jerzy Lubianiec
- Headquarters: Gdańsk, Poland
- Number of locations: 365 (2024)
- Area served: Europe, Asia, and Middle East
- Products: Clothing; Accessories
- Parent: LPP
- Website: www.reserved.com

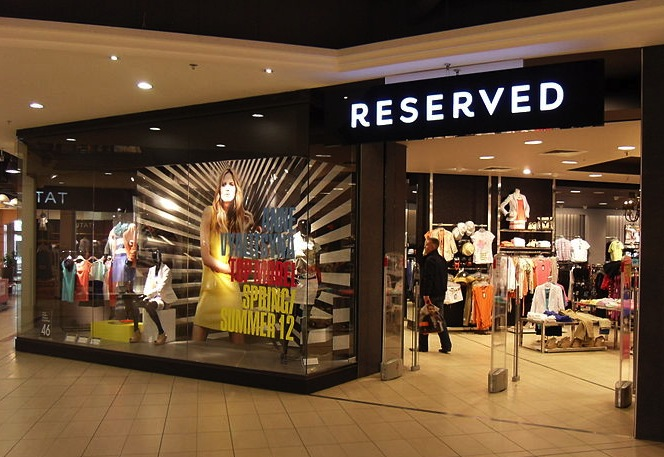
Reserved shop in Gdańsk, Poland

Reserved is a Polish apparel retailer headquartered in Gdańsk, Poland. It was founded in 1999 and remains the flagship brand of the LPP group, which has more than 2,200 retail stores located in over 38 countries and also owns such brands as Cropp, House, Mohito, and Sinsay.

Reserved has over 360 brick-and-mortar stores worldwide and an online presence in more than 30 countries.

== History ==
The LPP company was established in 1989 and the first stores under the Reserved fashion brand were opened in 1999. The founders of the company are Marek Piechocki, a civil engineering graduate from the Gdańsk University of Technology and businessman Jerzy Lubianiec. In 2001, the company made its debut on the Warsaw Stock Exchange.

In 2014, Reserved opened their first store in Germany, in Recklinghausen.

September 2016, it was announced that Reserved would be taking over the lease on the former British Home Stores (BHS) flagship store on London's Oxford Street. The store officially opened on 6 September 2017.

In October 2018, Reserved opened their first store in Almaty, Kazakhstan. In December the same year, the brand launched a special collection available in its stores which was created in collaboration with Vogue UK.

In December 2019, Reserved opened their first store in the Abu Dhabi Plaza skyscraper, in Astana, Kazakhstan. In 2020, the company opened its first store in Dubai, United Arab Emirates.

In 2020, Reserved was included in the Best Brands 2020 ranking featuring the TOP 10 best brands in Poland compiled by YouGov and Inquiry.

In 2020, the company initiated the process of launching the EcoAware collection which is aimed at replacing standard textiles with more sustainable materials and products sewn in factories that meet the standards for reducing the use of natural resources in the production process. The brand announced plans for garments with the Eco Aware label to constitute 50% of the company's offer in 2025.

In 2022, the brand's owner announced plans of further expansion on the EU market by entering Italy, Greece and Cyprus as well as strengthening the Reserved brand in Germany and Britain.

In 2023, the company opened its first flagship store in Milan, Italy. The store is located on the city's major shopping street Corso Vittorio Emanuele II and is part of the refocus on Western Europe strategy. The same year, the brand began a collaboration with the Bolesławiec Ceramic Works, which resulted in a collection of ceramics, accessories and clothes inspired by the traditional Bolesławiec design.

=== Locations ===
Besides Poland, stores are located in Bahrain, Belarus, Bosnia and Herzegovina, Bulgaria, Croatia, Czech Republic, Egypt, Estonia, Finland, France, Germany, Great Britain, Hungary, Israel, Italy, Kazakhstan, Kuwait, Latvia, Lithuania, North Macedonia, Qatar, Romania, Serbia, Saudi Arabia, Slovakia, Slovenia, Ukraine, and the United Arab Emirates.

=== Models ===
The company has collaborated with a number of artists and models who participated in advertising campaigns, including Kate Moss, Kendall Jenner, Cindy Crawford, Brooklyn Beckham, Cara Delevingne, Freja Beha Erichsen, Georgia May Jagger, Magdalena Frąckowiak, Anne Vyalitsyna, Adwoa Aboah, Jourdan Dunn, Jon Kortajarena, Irina Shayk and Anna Jagodzińska.

=== Suspension of business in Russia ===
On 4 March 2022, LPP, the owner of the brand, suspended all of its business activities on the Russian market alongside many other global companies as a response to the 2022 Russian invasion of Ukraine. The company also temporarily suspended its business in Ukraine and moved its administration offices from Kyiv to Lviv. The stores in Ukraine were re-opened in June 2022. As of 2022, Russia remained the second biggest market for the brand's parent company with approximately 500 stores and a distribution centre located in Russia and together with the Ukrainian market constituted approximately 25% of the company's revenue.

In July 2022 it was announced that LPP sold its stores in Russia to a company "Far East Services - FZCO" registered in the United Arab Emirates.

== Gallery ==
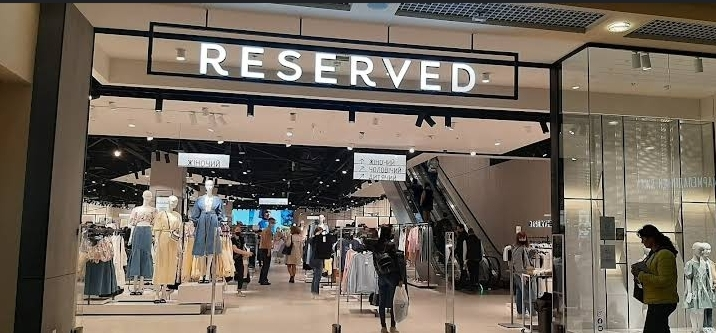
A Reserved store in a shopping center in Kharkiv, Ukraine

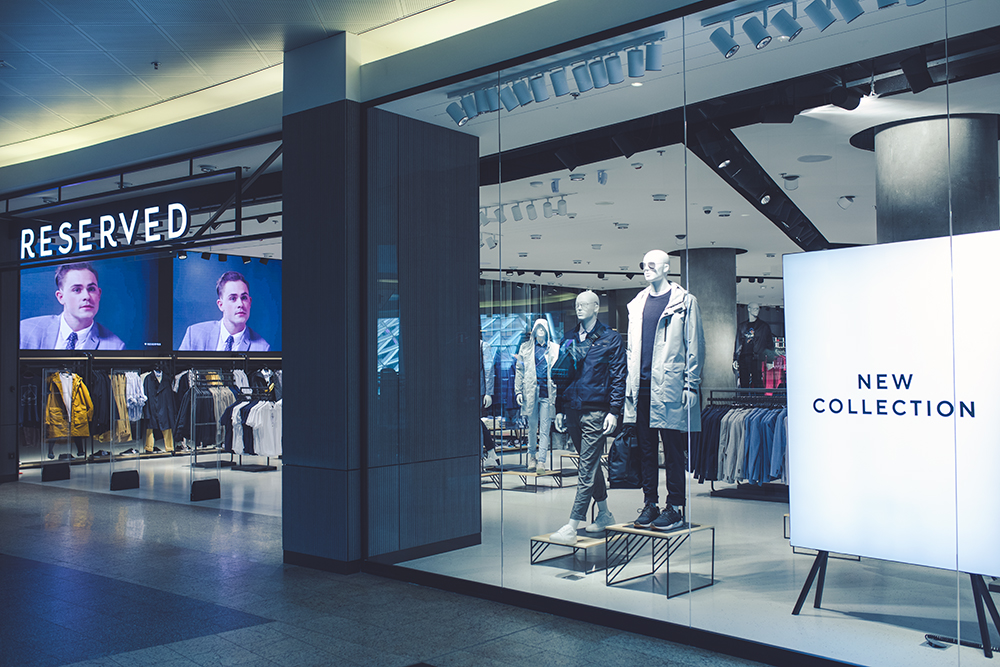
A Reserved store in a shopping center in Warsaw, Poland

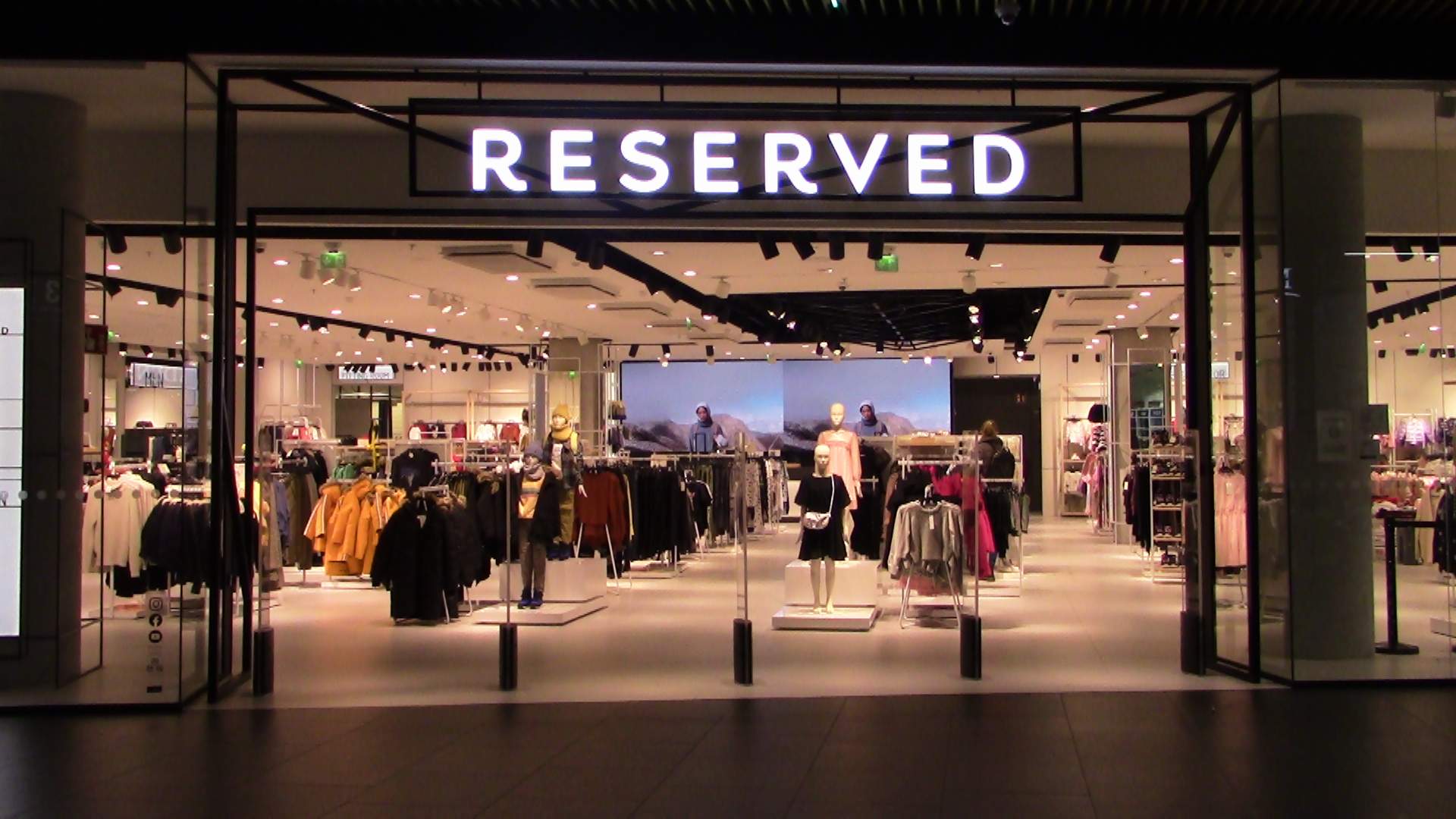
A Reserved store in the Mall of Tripla in Helsinki, Finland

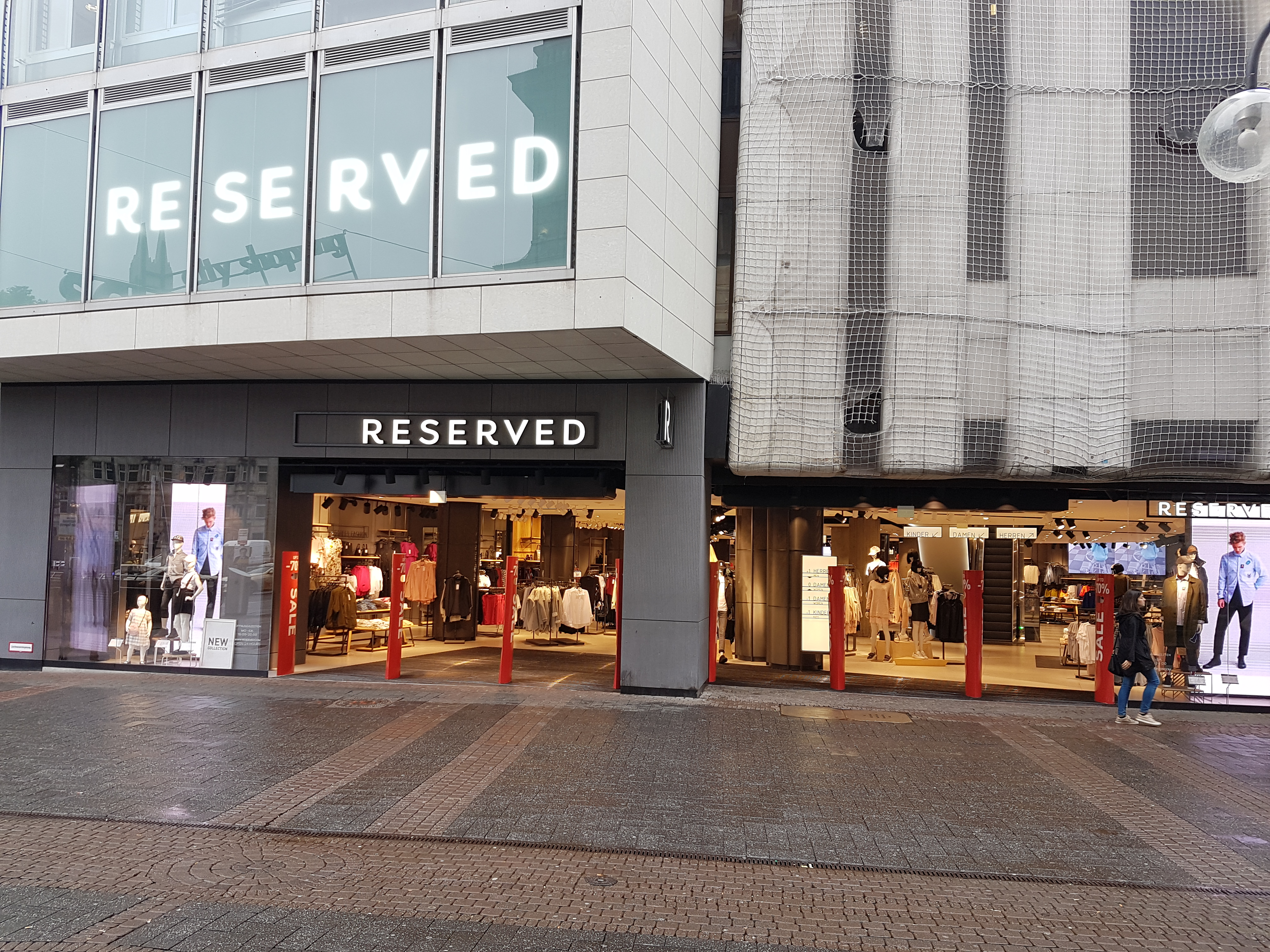
A Reserved store in Köln, Germany

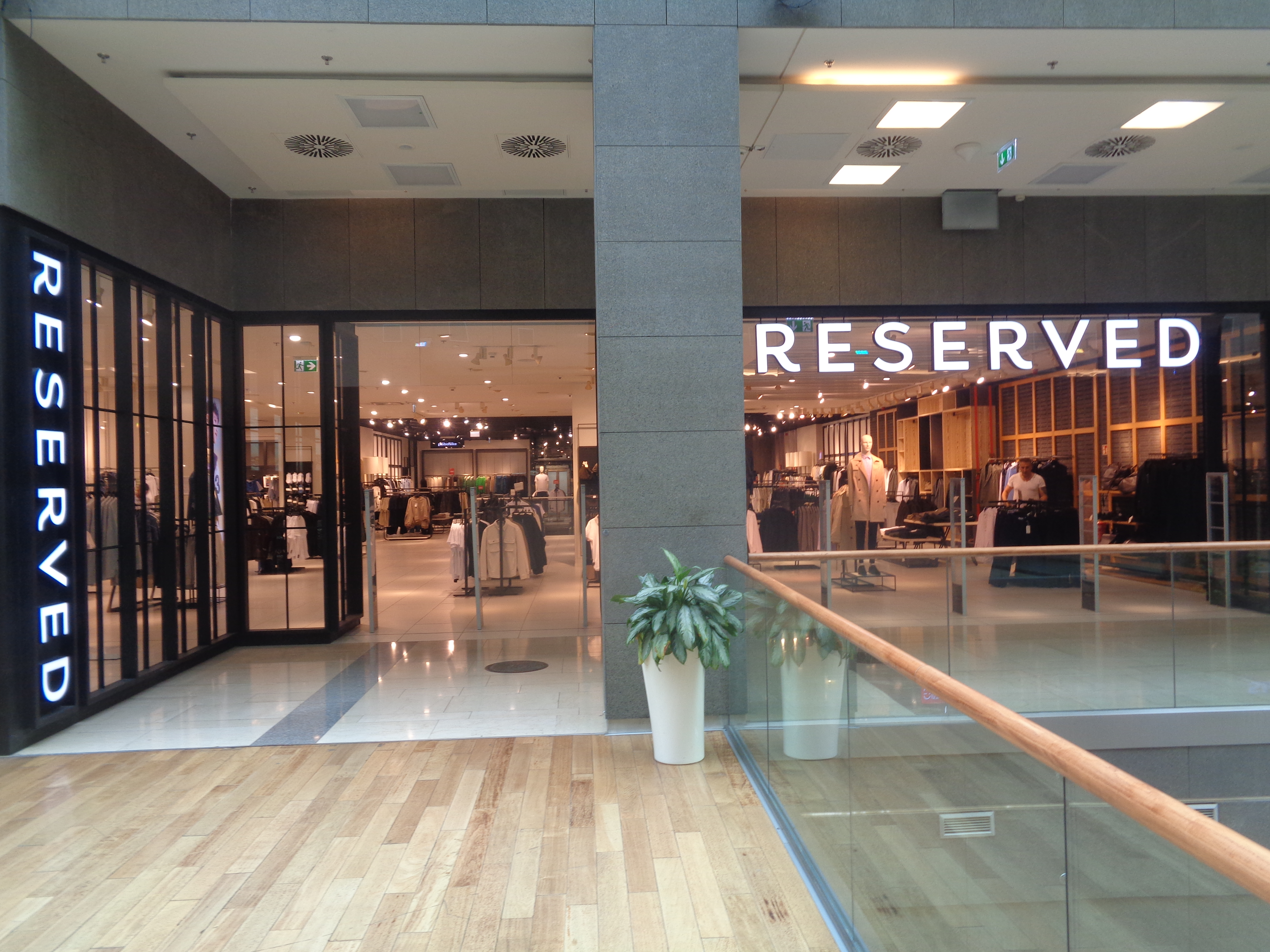
A Reserved store in a shopping center in Budapest, Hungary

== See also ==
- Fashion industry
- Economy of Poland
- List of companies of Poland
- H&M
- Zara
- Gap Inc.
