= P.S. Fashion =

International brand from Serbia

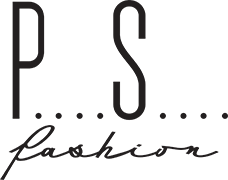
- P.S. Fashion brand logo
- Native name: P.S. Fešn
- Company type: d.o.o.
- Industry: Clothing, retail
- Founded: 17 April 2006; 20 years ago (Current form); 1 July 1996; 29 years ago (Originally founded)
- Headquarters: Milutina Mandića 29, Čačak, Serbia
- Area served: Serbia; Bosnia and Herzegovina; Montenegro; Croatia; Slovenia; North Macedonia; Paris; Toronto
- Key people: Predrag Pantović (Director)
- Products: Wear; Accessories
- Revenue: ▲€12.40 million (2018)
- Net income: ▼€0.85 million (2018)
- Total assets: ▲€12.70 million (2018)
- Total equity: ▲€5.69 million (2018)
- Number of employees: 295 (2018)
- Website: ps.rs

P.S. Fashion (stylized as P...S.... fashion) is an international brand from Serbia. It is the flagship chain store of the P.S. Fashion Design, clothing company headquartered in Čačak, Serbia.

== History ==
P.S. Fashion was established in 1996 as small clothing craft, by marital partners Slađana and Predrag Pantović. As of 2008, it was already one of the largest clothing companies in Serbia with monthly production of 25,000 clothing pieces and around 300 employees.

As of 2018, P.S Fashion is one of the largest Serbian clothing companies and one of the largest companies in the city of Čačak.

== Social responsibility ==
P.S. Fashion has sponsored local basketball club KK Borac Čačak which plays in top-tier of Serbia - Basketball League of Serbia. Company's owner and director Predrag Pantović has been the president of the club since December 2017.

== See also ==
- List of supermarket chains in Serbia
