= C-market =

Serbian brands

C-market Ц-маркет
- Type: Supermarket
- Industry: Retail
- Founded: 1971
- Headquarters: Belgrade, Serbia
- Parent: Maxi
- Website: www.cmarket.rs

C-market was a Serbian supermarket chain. In the past C-market was the biggest retail chain in Serbia, today it's part of Maxi. All of the C-market stores were rebranded to "Maxi" or "Mini Maxi" after the chain was sold to Delta Holding.

C-market was a first company operating a supermarket chain in Serbia (part of Yugoslavia then). The first supermarket was opened in Belgrade, the capital of Serbia, in 1958.

C-market was state-owned in Yugoslavia and Serbia and Montenegro.
