= SIMPO =

Companies based in Vranje

- Official logo
- Native name: СИМПО
- Type: Joint-stock company
- Traded as: BELEX: SMPO
- Industry: Manufacturing
- Founded: 13 November 2000; 25 years ago (Current form); 1963; 63 years ago (Founded)
- Headquarters: Radnička 12, Vranje, Serbia
- Key people: Slađan Disić (General director)
- Products: Furniture
- Revenue: ▼€15.63 million (2025)
- Net income: ▲ (€22.09 million) (2025)
- Total assets: ▼€99.80 million (2025)
- Total equity: ▼€5.32 million (2025)
- Owner: Government of Serbia (57.26%); Others (as of 15 September 2026)
- Number of employees: 1,828 (2025)
- Subsidiaries: Subsidiaries
- Website: simpo.rs

SIMPO (full legal name: SIMPO a.d. Vranje) is a Serbian home furnishing manufacturer and retailer, with the headquarters located in Vranje.

== History ==
Founded in 1963 as Sima Pogačarević furniture factory (named after a local fighter from World War II), the company was unsuccessful in its first four years, until in 1967, when Dragan Tomić was appointed as the new CEO. He began a period of growth and prosperity for the company, transforming a small company with 370 employees into one of the most successful Yugoslav companies.

In 2005, SIMPO sold its water-bottling company "Vlasinska voda" to Coca-Cola HBC for 20 million euros.

During the 2010s, the company became unprofitable, which resulted in cutting the number of employees, from around 4,400 in 2013 to around 2,600 as of 2016. Also, in March 2015 a long-time general director Dragan Tomić, who stayed at the position from 1967 to 2015, resigned following pressure from the Government of Serbia due to poor results. In February 2019, the company went into reorganization process that should have lasted until 2024.

In November 2020, the Government of Serbia announced that it will be seeking new owners of several large companies owned by the Government through the privatization process; among them being SIMPO. As of 15 May 2024, the company is majority owned by the Government of Serbia and its dependent organizations.

== Subsidiaries ==
SIMPO is the owner or minority shareholder in 10 companies in Serbia and also has the capital in the following companies outside of Serbia:

- Simpo Sik d.o.o. Gradiška, Bosnia and Herzegovina
- Simpo-Podgorica d.o.o., Montenegro
- Simpo d.o.o. Uvoz-Izvoz Skopje, North Macedonia

== Name ==
The name SIMPO is a syllabic abbreviation from the original name and is usually spelled with all capital letters, but variants 'Simpo' and 'simpo' are common, too.

== Activities ==
Simpo offers living room furniture (sofas, armchairs, tables, shelves etc.), storage furniture and decorative accessories, bedroom furniture and accessories (beds, rugs) as well as mattresses and bedding. Its product range also includes kitchen and dining room furniture and equipment and office furniture. The company also sells lighting and accessories for balconies and gardens.

== See also ==
- List of supermarket chains in Serbia
- List of companies of the Socialist Federal Republic of Yugoslavia
