= Pekabeta =

Serbian supermarket chain

Pekabeta Пекабета
- Company type: Supermarket
- Industry: Retail
- Founded: 2002
- Defunct: 2012
- Headquarters: Belgrade, Serbia
- Parent: Maxi
- Website: www.pekabeta.com

Pekabeta was a Serbian supermarket chain. All of the "Pekabeta" stores were rebranded into "Mini Maxi" after the chain has been sold to Delta Holding. Now the whole Maxi supermarket chain is fully owned by Ahold Delhaize.
