= Mega Maxi =

Serbian hypermarket chain owned by Ahold Delhaize

Mega Maxi Мега Макси
- Company type: Hypermarket
- Industry: Retail
- Founded: 2003
- Headquarters: Belgrade, Serbia
- Key people: Quentin Royer, Chief operating officer Delhaize Serbia (COO)
- Products: Discount Stores; Hypermarket; Supercentres
- Parent: Ahold Delhaize
- Website: www.maxi.rs/mega-maxi

Mega Maxi (formerly: Tempo Centar and Tempo Cash & Carry) is a Serbian hypermarket chain and a subsidiary of Ahold Delhaize.

== History ==
Former logo of Tempo

Tempo was founded in 2003, with headquarters located in Belgrade, Serbia. The first Tempo store, with 8,000 m^{2} (86,000 sq ft) of floor space, opened in Belgrade in 2004. Three more Tempo Cash and Carry stores were built and opened in 2006: one in Niš and in Novi Sad with 6,000 m^{2} (65,000 sq ft) of floor space, and another one in Belgrade (Kvantaš) with 8,500 m^{2} (91,000 sq ft) of floor space respectively.

The first Tempo was opened on July 15, 2004, in Viline Vode.

In June 2012, Marc Ernest Garofani was appointed Tempo's director.

Since August 2014, Maxi and Tempo is no longer operating in Bosnia and Herzegovina. The company Tropic Group from Banja Luka bought the 39 Tempo and Maxi supermarkets from Delhaize.

The Tempo store in Ada was the first store to be renamed Mega Maxi, followed by those in Niš, Čačak and Kragujevac. The remaining stores were renamed in 2023.

In December 2021, Tempo store in Novi Sad caught fire. At the time, a dozen of customers were in the store, but no one was injured. Reconstruction works begun in March 2023.

In addition to the Mega Maxi Ada facility, the other three facilities that have been rebranded to the Mega Maxi format are in Niš, Čačak and Kragujevac. The remaining facilities were rebranded to Mega Maxi during 2023.

== See also ==
- List of supermarket chains in Serbia
