= Forma Ideale =

Serbian home furnishing manufacturer

- Official logo
- Native name: Форма Идеале
- Type: Joint-stock company
- Industry: Manufacturing
- Founded: 30 January 2004; 22 years ago (Current form); 1995; 31 years ago (Founded)
- Headquarters: Kragujevac, Serbia
- Key people: Nikola Lazarević (Director)
- Revenue: ▲€81.96 million (2018)
- Net income: ▲€6.99 million (2018)
- Total assets: ▲€91.02 million (2018)
- Total equity: ▲€55.72 million (2018)
- Owner: Vladimir Lazarević (36.68%); Nikola Lazarević (35.20%); EBRD (16.72%); Others (as of January 2019)
- Number of employees: 1,670 (2018)
- Subsidiaries: Subsidiaries
- Website: www.formaideale.rs

Forma Ideale (Serbian Cyrillic: Форма Идеале) is a Serbian home furnishing manufacturer and retailer headquartered in Kragujevac, Serbia.

== History ==
The company was established in 1995 under the name "EL-EN", in Kragujevac, FR Yugoslavia. In 2001, it opened its first store in Serbia. As of 2017, it was the largest Serbian furniture manufacturer by worth of exports.

In August 2018, Forma Ideale bought from bankruptcy Kragujevac-based company "Metal sistemi" for 4.7 million euros.

As of 2018, Forma Ideale is among the largest furniture manufacturers in Serbia, and has sales network in 35 countries worldwide. Also, it is among the largest companies in Kragujevac and Šumadija District by revenue and export worth (as of 2018).

In January 2019, the European Bank for Reconstruction and Development became the minority shareholder in the company after acquiring 16.72% of shares for 10 million euros.

== Subsidiaries ==
- Sofa Style d.o.o.
- Green Field Invest d.o.o.
- Forma Real Estate Rent 1 d.o.o.
