= LPP (company) =

Polish apparel retailer

LPP Spółka Akcyjna
- Trade name: LPP
- Company type: Spółka Akcyjna
- Traded as: WSE: LPP; WIG30 component
- ISIN: PLLPP0000011
- Founded: Gdańsk, Poland (1991; 35 years ago)
- Headquarters: Gdańsk, Poland
- Number of locations: 2,847 (2025)
- Area served: Europe, Asia, Africa, Middle East
- Key people: Marek Piechocki; Jerzy Lubianiec
- Products: Clothing, Footwear, Accessories, Home accessories
- Revenue: $4.58 billion (2025)
- Operating income: $610 million (2025)
- Net income: $510 million (2025)
- Number of employees: 30,000
- Subsidiaries: Reserved; House; Cropp; Mohito; Sinsay
- Website: www.lpp.com

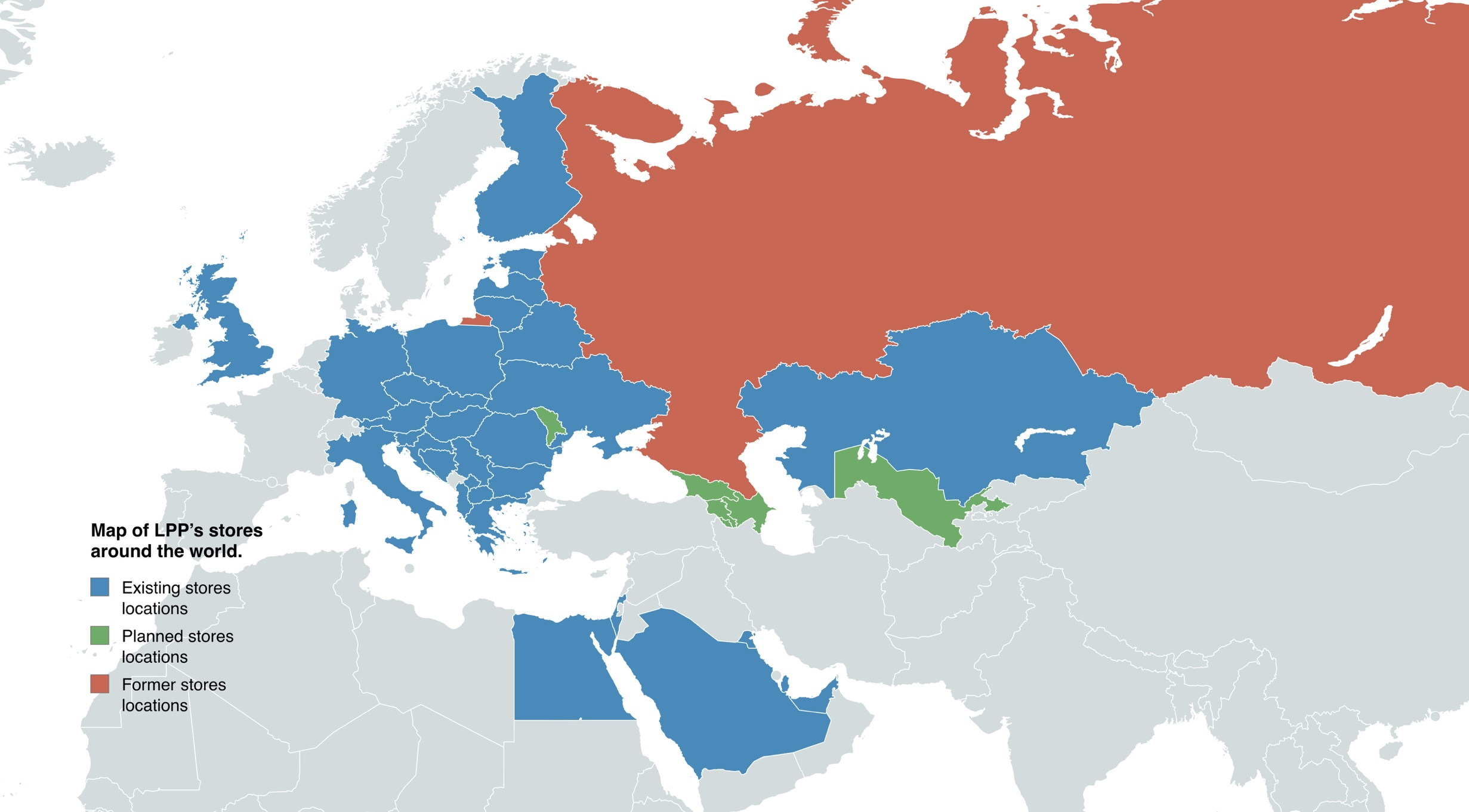
Map of LPP stores locations around the world.

LPP S.A. is a Polish multinational fashion group headquartered in Gdańsk, Poland. The company specializes in the distribution of clothing, footwear, accessories, as well as home and pet products, offered under its own brands through an extensive network of brick-and-mortar stores and e-commerce channels. LPP owns five distinct fashion brands: Reserved, House, Cropp, Mohito, and Sinsay, each catering to different customer segments and style preferences. LPP currently operates on 41 global markets, continually expanding its international footprint and digital reach, and currently employs nearly 30,000 people in its offices, distribution network and stores in Europe, Asia, Middle East and Africa. In 2022, the company generated almost PLN 16 billion in revenue and over PLN 1 billion in profits. LPP SA is listed on the Warsaw Stock Exchange as a part of the WIG30 index and belongs to the MSCI Poland index.

== History ==
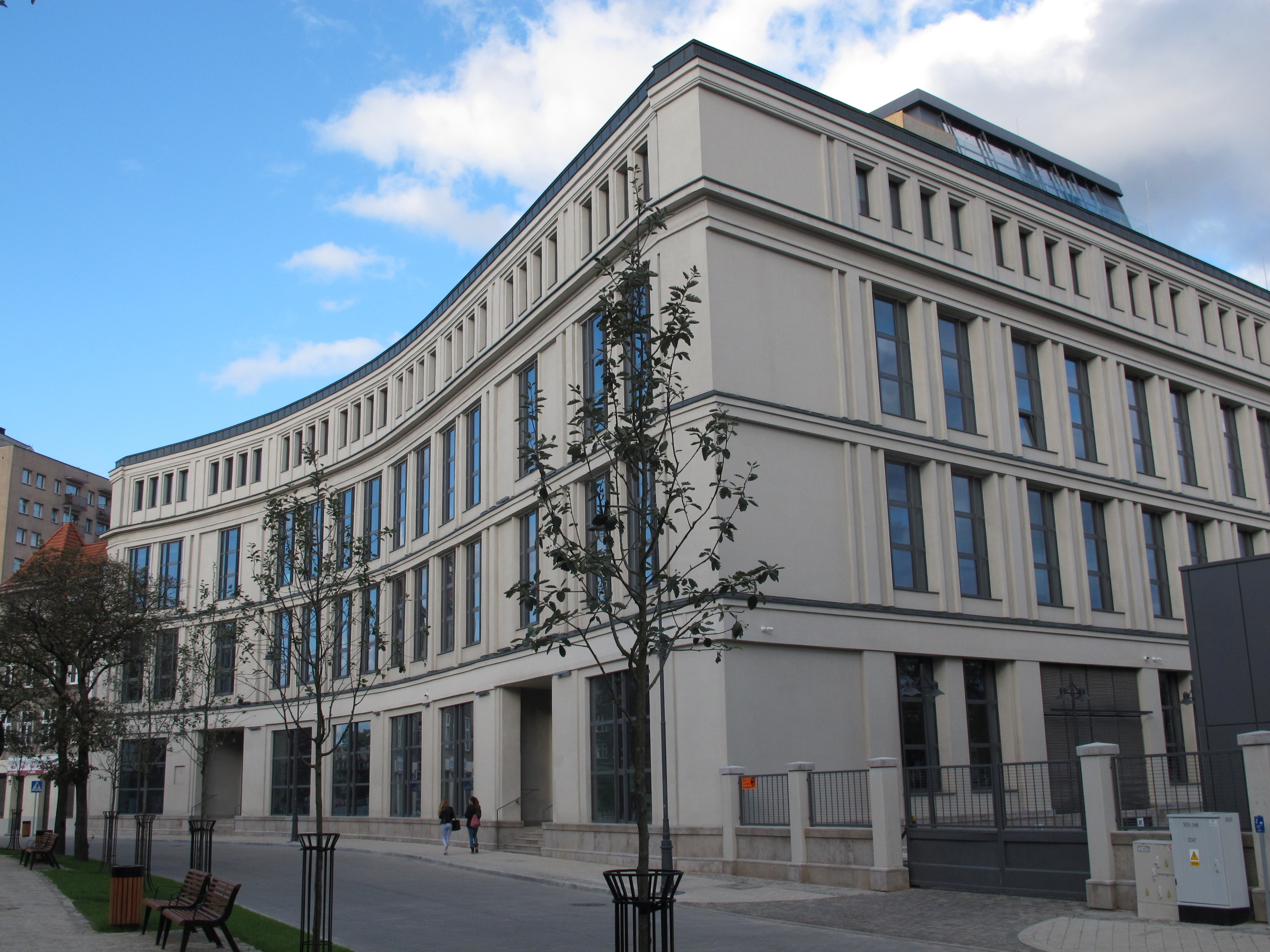
Company headquarter, Gdansk, Poland.

=== 1991–2000 ===
In 1991, Marek Piechocki and Jerzy Lubianiec, the founders of the company, started their business activities in the clothing industry in Gdańsk. After four years, the company initially operating under the name of PH Mistral s.c. was transformed into LPP (abbreviation of the surnames of its founders - Lubianiec, Piechocki and Partners). In 1997, the office in Shanghai was officially opened. In the late 1990s, the owners of LPP decided to create their first brand - Reserved - and build their own retail network. The first store of the brand was opened in 1998.

=== 2001–2013 ===
In 2001, LPP made its début on the Warsaw Stock Exchange. The next two years saw the expansion of Reserved brand to the markets of Central and Eastern Europe. In 2002, the company stores were opened in Russia, Estonia, the Czech Republic, Latvia, and Hungary, and in 2003 in Lithuania, Ukraine and Slovakia. The company expanded its portfolio and opened a Cropp store in Poland in 2004. In the following years the brand was launched in Estonia, Slovakia, and Latvia (2005) as well as in Lithuania, Russia, and the Czech Republic (2006). The years 2007 - 2008 were the period of development of activity on the Romanian and Bulgarian markets. In 2008, LPP opened its Distribution Centre in Pruszcz Gdański. In the same year, LPP took over a Cracow-based company - Artman - owner of House and Mohito brands. Owing to this transaction, LPP became the largest clothing company in Poland and the owner of four brands. In 2013, the company's portfolio was expanded by Sinsay brand.

=== 2014–2019 ===
In 2014, the company was included in the WIG20 index, and the flagship brand - Reserved - appeared on the German market. In the same year, all LPP products made their debut in Croatia. In the following year, the company expanded into the Middle East. At the end of 2017, the LPP sales network comprised more than 1,700 stores with a total area of 1 million square metres. In 2017, the LPP product office was opened in Warsaw, and Reserved, Cropp and House brands made their débuts in Belarus and Serbia. In 2017 LPP opened a Reserved store on Oxford Street in London. 2018 saw further debuts of LPP stores on new markets, including in Israel, Kazakhstan, and Slovenia. In 2019 the Company opened first stores in Bosnia and Herzegovina and Finland.

=== Since 2020 ===
In 2020, the company underwent an accelerated digital transformation in response to the restrictions on stationary trade caused by the COVID-19 pandemic, thereby transforming itself into an omnichannel organisation. The distinction between online and stationary sales was removed, and both channels have been treated as a customer-centric whole. A year later, with the stabilisation of the market, LPP returned to its policy of foreign expansion and, strengthening its position in South-Eastern Europe, opened the first stores of all its brands in North Macedonia. Two years later, following the Russian aggression against Ukraine, LPP took the key decision to cease operations in Russia altogether and sell the subsidiary to a Chinese consortium. As a result of the loss of its second-largest market, the company adopted a new development strategy, which involves further expansion in the central, southern and western parts of Europe and increased sales volumes in the e-commerce channel. In 2022, LPP opened Sinsay stationary stores in Italy, and with the beginning of the following year – in Greece.

In the fall of 2023, Reserved debuted in Milan, and also expanded brand’s retail network in the UK, opening four new stationary stores in London.

=== Future of LPP S.A. ===
In April 2025, LPP S.A., has outlined an ambitious growth strategy aimed at doubling its revenue to approximately PLN 40 billion by 2027. Central to this plan is the accelerated expansion of its budget-friendly brand, Sinsay, which is projected to contribute 75% of the company’s revenue by that time.

To achieve this, LPP intends to significantly increase its physical retail presence, aiming for around 7,500 stores by 2027. This expansion will be predominantly driven by Sinsay, with plans to open approximately 6,000 stores under this brand. The focus will be on penetrating smaller towns, particularly in Southern, Central, and Eastern Europe, where retail competition is less intense.

=== Alleged closing of business operations in Russia ===
On 4 March 2022, LPP suspended all of its business activities on the Russian market alongside many other global companies as a response to the 2022 Russian invasion of Ukraine. As of 2022, Russia remained the second biggest market for the company with approximately 500 stores and a distribution centre located in Russia. On 28 April 2022, LPP sold its Russian subsidiary to a "Chinese consortium" and closed their 20-year presence on said market.

However, on 16 March 2024, Hindenburg Research, an American short-selling research firm, published an extensive report detailing how they had not sold their Russian subsidiary, but continued to mask operate in Russia using front entities. During this period, LLP's primary loan and finance agreements were with PKO Bank Polski, Poland's largest bank. LLP might have been in breach of loan agreements, since bank stated that they do not finance entities operating in Russia or in cooperation with Russian contractors.

LLP's stock price tanked around 35% after the publication of the report. The company issued a statement in which it described the report's findings as a deliberate disinformation attack that had been in preparation for five months and was aimed at bringing down the company's stock price. LPP also announced it informed about this the Ministry of Foreign Affairs as well as the National Revenue Administration. As a result of these allegations, Warsaw Police Department opened an investigation regarding "the dissemination via the internet of information that gave or was likely to give false or misleading signals as to the actual demand, supply or price of a financial instrument".

== Stores and distribution centres ==
LPP’s global sourcing network is based on three distribution centres, dedicated to servicing over 2,000 stores worldwide (Reserved, Sinsay, House, Cropp and Mohito), as well as Fulfillment Centres, supporting the company’s online sales. All logistics processes are designed and managed by LPP Logistics – a logistics operator belonging to the LPP Group.

The company’s first distribution centre in Pruszcz Gdański was launched in 2008. It has since undergone modernisation and several expansions. In 2017, LPP began shipping from its newly opened FC in Stryków near Łódź. As a result of the rapid growth of e-commerce, in 2019 the company opened another warehouse to handle online orders in Romania, and a year later signed a contract to lease warehouse space in Slovakia. Further demand for the expansion of logistics facilities resulted in launch of further Fulfillment Centres in Pruszcz Gdański and Podkarpacie in 2022. In the same period, the Group’s second distribution centre, Brześć Kujawski DC, became operational. At the end of 2022, the total warehouse space of all facilities managed by LPP Logistics amounted to over 400,000 m^{2}.

== Brands ==
LPP owns five brands that offer a variety of products aimed at different group of consumers.

Brand	Year of creation	Number of stores (2024)	Target consumers	Markets	Notes
Reserved	1998	365	Reserved is LPP’s flagship brand. The brand offers women’s, men’s, and children’s fashion, along with accessories and footwear.	Besides Poland, stores are located in Austria, Belarus, Bosnia and Herzegovina, Bulgaria, Croatia, Czech Republic, Egypt, Estonia, Finland, France, Germany, Great Britain, Hungary, Israel, Italy, Kazakhstan, Kuwait, Latvia, Lithuania, North Macedonia, Qatar, Romania, Serbia, Saudi Arabia, Slovakia, Slovenia, Ukraine, and the United Arab Emirates.	The brand introduced Reserved Home in 2024, specializing in home textiles and decorations. It was closed the same year due to poor sales.
House	2001; acquired in 2009	371	A brand for teenagers and young adults.	Physical stores in 19 European countries and online sales available in 22 countries.	
Cropp	2004	374	Cropp is a streetwear brand inspired by music, art, and sports. Clothing, footwear, and accessories for both men and women.	In 2024, the company owned 374 stores in Europe, located in 18 countries, including stores in Poland, and in other countries such as Belarus, Bosnia and Herzegovina, Bulgaria, Croatia, Czech Republic, Estonia, Finland, Hungary, Kazakhstan, Latvia, Lithuania, Poland, Romania, Serbia, Slovakia, Slovenia, and Ukraine.	
Mohito	2008; acquired in 2009	234	A brand aimed at women, offering clothing, accessories, and perfumes.	Physical stores in 22 countries, including Poland, Italy, Ukraine, and Finland, as well as an additional online store in Germany and Spain.	
Sinsay	2013	1230	Sinsay is a brand offering clothing for women, men, and children, as well as pet products, home décor, textiles, and cosmetics.	Poland, Czech Republic, Slovakia, Hungary, Romania, Moldova, Bulgaria, Croatia, Serbia, Slovenia, Bosnia and Herzegovina, Lithuania, Latvia, Estonia, Italy, Greece, Ukraine, North Macedonia, Kosovo, and Germany (online store).	In 2023, the brand introduced Sinsay Club for its customers – a loyalty program where points are earned for every purchase, which can be exchanged for discount vouchers.
Tallinder	2016	8 (closed)	A premium brand. The collection included men’s and women’s clothing, accessories, and footwear. Most of the collection was made in Europe, including Poland, Italy, Portugal, and Turkey.	Poland	All Tallinder stores has been closed since 2017 due to poor sales.

== Production ==
LPP does not operate its own factories. The clothing of the Group's brands is produced mainly in Asia, but also in Poland and other European countries, including Italy, Portugal, Romania, Bulgaria, and Turkey. Since 1997, the company has had an office in Shanghai, and since 2015, also in the capital of Bangladesh - Dhaka.

== Presence on the Warsaw Stock Exchange ==
LPP SA has been listed on the Warsaw Stock Exchange since 2001. At the time of its début, the price per share was PLN 48. In 2014, LPP was included in the WIG20 index of the 20 largest companies listed on the Warsaw Stock Exchange. In the same year, LPP was included in the MSCI index.

== Shareholding structure ==
According to the company's own data, the number of votes at the General Meeting of Shareholders is as follows:

- Semper Simul Foundation – 60.8%
- Sky Foundation – 5.7%
- Others – 33.5%

In order to ensure its long-term continuity and avoid the fragmentation of LPP capital in the future, the founders of the company decided in 2018 to establish a foundation and contribute their shares there. In 2020, the Semper Simul Foundation, which is the majority shareholder of the company, took over the controlling stake of LPP in order to provide stable management of the family business and the implementation of its strategy.

== Production in Asia, supply chain control and ACCORD agreement ==
Since 2013, LPP has been systematically working on the implementation of standards for improving safety and working conditions in the clothing industry in Asia. Since 2014, a Code of Conduct has been in force for all suppliers working with LPP. The document takes into account the key provisions of the International Labour Organization conventions and the Universal Declaration of Human Rights and sets out the requirements for suppliers, including, among others, wage policy, prohibition of child labour, voluntary nature of work, freedom of association, occupational health and safety principles. In order to increase supervision over the factories producing for LPP in Bangladesh, in addition to controlling its own inspectors, the company decided to commission an international auditor, SGS, to verify the actual compliance of suppliers in Bangladesh with the Code of Conduct.

In addition, in October 2013, LPP, as the only Polish clothing company, joined the ACCORD Agreement aimed at improving safety in clothing factories in Bangladesh (Accord on Fire and Building Safety in Bangladesh). Thanks to the cooperation and financial support of the signatories of the agreement, a total of more than 1600 Asian production plants and sewing plants were subject to inspection. ACCORD also contributed to the implementation of recovery programmes in more than 90% of the factories (as at the end of 2017). As part of the “Safety Committee Training” programme, one of the key projects of the agreement, by the end of 2017, 882 training courses were conducted in which nearly 1.2 million employees participated.

At the beginning of 2018, LPP signed another 3-year extension of the agreement, the so-called “Transition ACCORD”. Its main objective is to prepare the Bengali government to carry out independent inspections and audits in the factories and to ensure further implementation of measures aimed at sustainable improvement of working conditions. As of 1 September 2021, a new initiative - called the International Accord for Health and Safety in the Textile and Garment Industry (International Accord for short) - was established to replace the existing ACCORD initiative. Its aim is to continue and expand the joint efforts of the signatories of the agreement together with trade unions to ensure safety in garment factories.

In 2022, the company joined amfori BSCI, a global initiator of sustainable production and trade activities. This membership will enable LPP to better verify and monitor ethical, labour and environmental issues in collaborating factories.

A year later, in turn, LPP was the only Polish company to become a signatory to Accord Pakistan (The Pakistan Accord on Health and Safety in the Textile and Garment Industry), which aims to control working and safety conditions in supply chains involving suppliers from Pakistan.

== LPP as a tax payer ==
According to a report by the Ministry of Finance, in 2018, LPP was ranked third among the largest CIT payers in Poland in the commercial sector.

Year	Revenues (PLN bn)	Income (PLN mn)	CIT (PLN mn)
2021	12	1959	355.3
2020	6.5	219	41
2019	8.2	850	108
2018	6.9	1044	144.8
2017	6.1	536	41
2016	5.2	243	6
2015	4.8	419	44
2014	4.4	622	86
2013	3.8	542	87
2012	3	393	57

Since 2016, the company has paid a total of PLN 7.6 bn to the state budget for taxes and other tributes, while its contribution to the Polish budget in 2022 alone amounted to nearly 1.7 bn.

=== Charitable activity ===
In December 2017, the company established the LPP Foundation. The aim of its activities is to support people threatened by social exclusion, help people in difficult life situations and ensure health protection.

== Environment policy ==
Since 2017, the company has been reporting regularly on its sustainability activities in the form of reports available at https://www.lppsa.com/zrownowazony-rozwoj/raport-roczny. Gradual reduction of its carbon footprint has been adopted as one of the main objectives of its sustainability-oriented activities. To this end, the company calculated its CO_{2} emissions independently in 2021, taking into account all three scopes and categories defined in the GHG Protocol.

In 2021, LPP adapted its organisational structure by creating the position of Director of Purchasing and ESG. The role’s responsibilities comprise planning and coordinating the implementation of responsible business standards within LPP Group, developing and implementing guidelines in all three ESG pillars: environmental, social and corporate governance.

== See also ==
- List of Polish companies
- Economy of Poland
- Inditex
- H&M Group
- Pepco
