= Mix Markt =

German supermarket chain

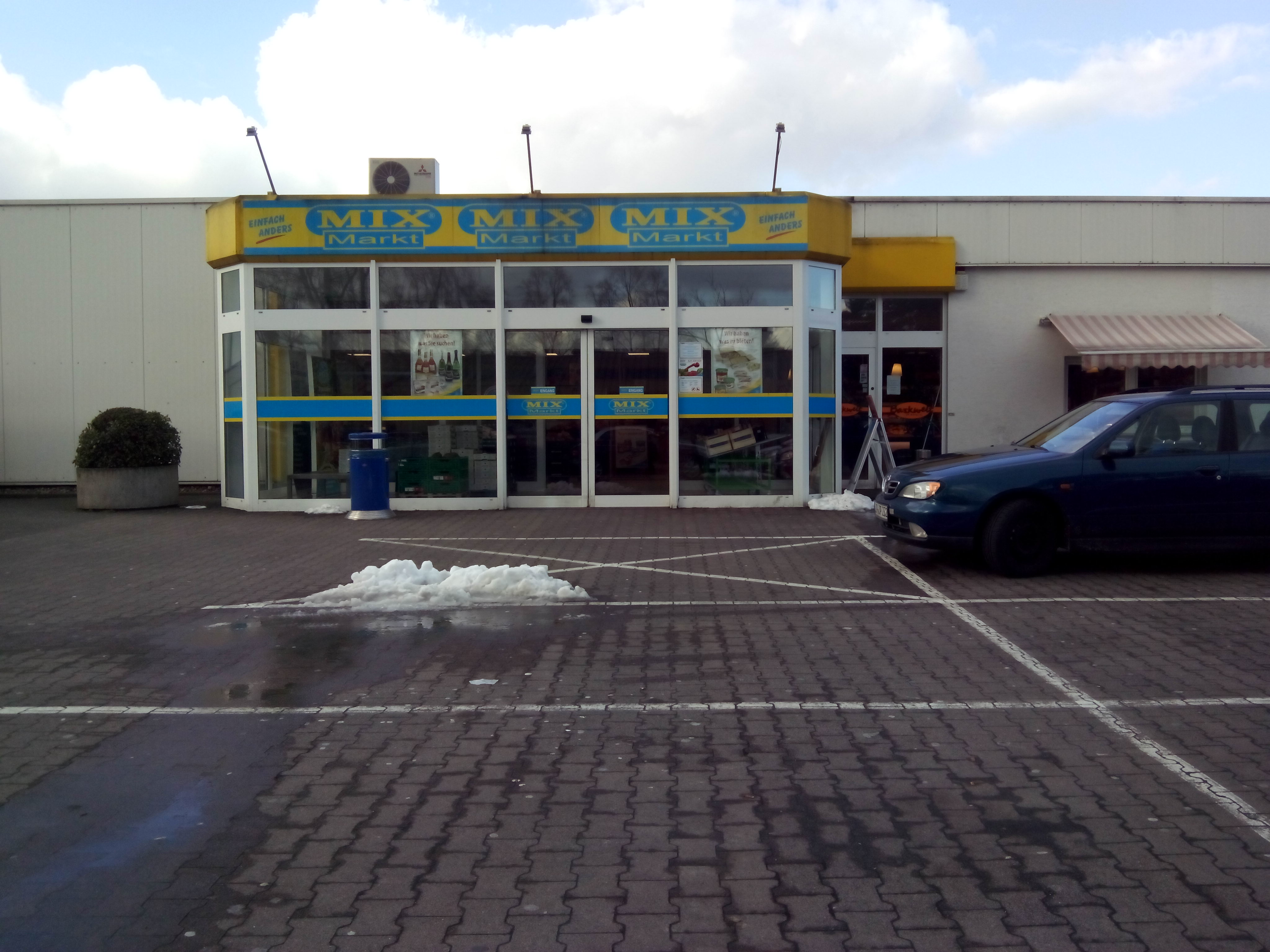
- First Mix Markt in Oerlinghausen
- Industry: Retail
- Founded: 1997; 29 years ago
- Headquarters: Herrenberg, Germany
- Number of locations: 483 stores (2020)
- Key people: Alexander Völker; Peter Schuju; Artur Steinhauer; Hermann Völker
- Revenue: €345 million (2016)
- Number of employees: 1600 (2017)
- Website: Official website

Mix Markt is a German supermarket chain that operates throughout Europe that specializes in the distribution of fresh and canned foods for the Central and Eastern European cuisines. It was founded in 1997 by three Germans from Kazakhstan: Waldemar Völker, Artur Steinhauer, and Peter Schuju, who opened the first shop in Oerlinghausen, Germany.

Mix Markt is a brand of the Monolith Group, which also acts as wholesale supplier for each market, which operate as licensed partnership companies. In 2016, Mix Markt had a turnover of €345 million.

As of 2026, there are a total of 483 shops in 20 European countries: Germany (197), Belgium (13), Greece (24), United Kingdom (7), Italy (73), Netherlands (4), Portugal (21), Spain (23), Cyprus (10), France (6), Montenegro (10), Austria (8), Czech Republic (13), Slovakia (7), Slovenia (1), Bulgaria (5), Serbia (10), Poland (47), Latvia (1), Malta (1)
