= Univerexport =

Serbian market chain

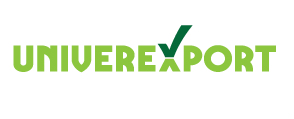
- Official logo
- Native name: Универекспорт
- Romanized name: Univereksport
- Type: d.o.o.
- Industry: Retail
- Founded: 25 September 1990; 35 years ago
- Headquarters: Sentandrejski put 165, Novi Sad, Serbia
- Number of locations: 210 stores (July 2025)
- Area served: Serbia
- Number of employees: ▲3,207 (2024)
- Subsidiaries: Grupa Univerexport Trgopromet a.d. Grupa Univerexport Bačka a.d. Grupa Univerexport Alba d.o.o.
- Website: www.univerexport.rs
- Footnotes; Business ID: 08207259; Tax ID: 101692669

Univerexport is the largest domestically owned retail chain in Serbia. It was founded on September 25, 1990. Univerexport has a sales network that currently consists of over 200 retail stores.

== History ==
Univerexport is one of the leading domestic retail chains. It was founded by Bogdan Rodić on September 25, 1990, and the company initially dealt exclusively with the import of consumer goods. At that time, Univerexport was a family business with four employees. In 1991, the development of the great giant began, from the opening of a warehouse for storage purposes, on Bajči Žilinski Street in Novi Sad, through the opening of the first wholesale and the first store.[1]

In 1995, Univerexport launched its own bakery production. In 2007, it became the majority owner of AD Bačka, a domestic meat production farm. In 2014, Univerexport also launched its own organic production under the Organa brand. Today, Univerexport has more than 600 branded products, the Elakolije online service, and its domestic farm Bačka. In 2010, Univerexport opened its first store in Belgrade, and today it operates throughout Serbia.

Business

Over the past 35 years, Univerexport has grown into one of the leading domestic trading companies in the field of wholesale and retail trade of consumer goods. Univerexport currently operates through several sales formats: wholesale, supermarkets, markets, mini-markets, online shopping.

In addition to its core business, Univerexport also produces its own domestic and organic products, such as Bačka fresh meat and meat delicacies, prosciutto and wines from the Vučurević household, as well as organic products of the Organa brand.

Trademark

Univerexport, as a large retail chain, monitors the needs and habits of consumers and, based on the analysis of the data obtained, selects manufacturers. Through placement and promotion, consumers are offered a product of the same or better quality than the best-selling item from the corresponding product group. The result of success is satisfaction with the quality and price of products from the assortment of the trademark of Univerexport, which are already recognizable under the names: Baš Baš, Daj Daj, Naše najbolje.

Sales network

Univerexport has a wide sales network with sales facilities in Novi Sad and Belgrade, and throughout Vojvodina. Since 2022, the network has been expanding intensively across the entire Serbian market.

In parallel with the development of the traditional sales network, Univerexport has also been developing an online solution. In 2012, the online service for ordering and delivering goods Univerexport online eLAKOLIJE began operating.

Social responsibility

The company donates and helps various organizations that focus on marginalized groups of people, sports and cultural associations. Through humanitarian work, Univerexport has so far supported over 2,000 initiatives and sponsored a large number of events. Univerexport has directed its business policy towards environmental protection.

In 2017, the company established the Univerexport Foundation, which continues its activities in the field of social responsibility.

Retail stores:

Big stores: Apatin; Bačka Palanka; Banatsko Veliko Selo; Beograd; Ćuprija; Jagodina; Kanjiža; Kikinda; Kula; Mladenovac; Mokrin; Nova Pazova; Novi Sad; Paraćin; Ruma; Smederevska Palanka; Sombor; Sremska Kamenica; Sremski Karlovci; Sremska Mitrovica; Stara Pazova; Subotica; Užice; Vrbas; Vršac; Zlatibor; Zrenjanin	Super markets: Ada; Bačka Palanka; Bački Jarak; Bački Petrovac; Bački Vinogradi; Bačko Gradište; Bajmok; Bečej; Beočin; Beograd; Čantavir; Čoka; Čurug; Futog; Inđija; Kać; Kikinda; Kruševac; Lazarevac; Nakovo; Novi Bečej; Novi Kozarci	Super markets: Novi Sad; Obrenovac; Palić; Petrovaradin; Ruma; Rumenka; Senta; Sirig; Srbobran; Sremska Kamenica; Subotica; Temerin; Veternik; Vrdnik; Vrnjačka Banja; Vršac; Zlatibor; Zrenjanin; Žabalj	Mini markets: Banatsko Novo Selo; Banatsko Veliko Selo; Batajnica; Đurđin; Kikinda; Mali Iđoš; Mokrin; Novi Sad; Novi Žednik; Odžaci; Pačir; Palić; Petrovaradin; Rusko Selo; Stara Moravica; Subotica; Zmajevo; Zrenjanin

== See also ==
- List of supermarket chains in Serbia
