= Tom Tailor =

German clothing company

Tom Tailor Holding SE
- Type: Societas Europaea
- Industry: Fashion
- Founded: 1962
- Founders: Uwe Schroeder; Hans-Henrich Pünjer
- Headquarters: Hamburg, Germany
- Number of locations: 577 (2024)
- Area served: Worldwide
- Key people: Dr Gernot Lenz (CEO); Kun "Kevin" Shi (chairman of the supervisory board)
- Products: Clothing; Accessories; Footwear
- Revenue: €843.8 million (2018)
- Number of employees: 6,158 (2018)
- Parent: Tom Tailor Holding AG
- Website: tom-tailor.com

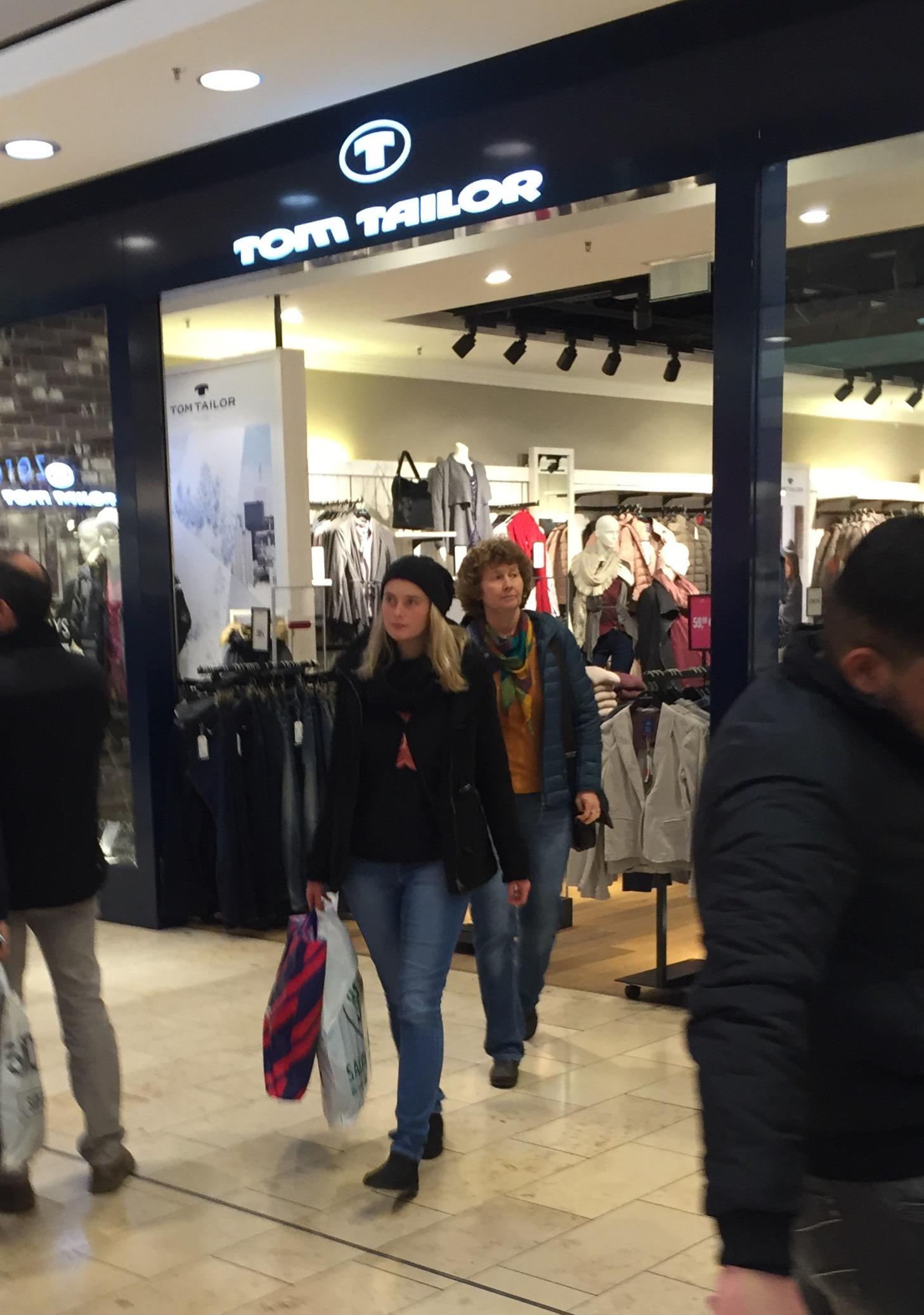
Tom Tailor store

Tom Tailor (TT) is a German vertically integrated lifestyle fashion company headquartered in Hamburg. The range includes clothing and accessories for men and women of all ages in the middle to upper price segment.

In 2024, the company had 577 retail stores worldwide in 23 countries in Europe.

== History ==
Tom Tailor was founded in 1962 in Hamburg as Henke & Co. and received its present name in 1989. Tom Tailor clothes are usually priced in the middle to upper price range. The company's core markets are Germany, Austria, Switzerland, the Benelux countries and France.

As of 31 December 2011, Tom Tailor products were sold in 248 own retail stores, the Tom Tailor E-Shop (Germany, Austria and Netherlands), 155 franchise stores and 1,786 shop-in-shops in 35 countries around the world. In fiscal year 2011, the Tom Tailor Group had approximately 1,541 employees and it generated sales of €411.6 million. It was the best fiscal year in their corporate history.

The group's parent company Tom Tailor Holding AG initially planned to raise up to €190 million during their IPO and made their Initial public offering on 26 March 2010 with bookrunners Commerzbank and J.P. Morgan & Co. The company is listed in the Prime Standard of the Frankfurt Stock Exchange.

In October 2019, Tom Tailor reached an agreement with consortium banks and its majority shareholder on developing a new financial structure until the end of September 2022. The new agreement is valued at a total of €365 million.

== Brands ==
Tom Tailor mainly provides classic and up-to-date casual wear and accessories for men, women, young adults and children. For each of its four brands, Tom Tailor Group launches twelve collections per year. The first sportswear collection was launched in 1979 and the first jeans wear collection and first store abroad appeared in 1996. Tom Tailor's women's label was founded in 1999 and the Tom Tailor E-Shop opened in 2006. In the next year young fashion collections Tom Tailor Denim for men and women were launched. The current brands are:

- Tom Tailor – Men, women and kids
- Tom Tailor Denim – Male and female
