= House (brand) =

Polish clothing company

- Industry: Clothing retail
- Founded: 2001
- Founder: Artman company
- Headquarters: Kraków, Poland
- Number of locations: 371 (2024)
- Area served: Europe
- Products: Clothing
- Owner: LPP
- Website: housebrand.com

House is a clothing brand and retailer chain, owned by LPP. Its headquarters are located in Kraków, Poland. In 2024, the company owned over 370 stores, including stores in Poland and other countries across Europe. Additionally, it operated online retail in 22 countries. It was established in 2001 by Artman, and bought by LPP in 2009.

== Stores ==
In 2024, company owned 371 stores, including stores in Poland, and in other countries across Europe including Bosnia and Herzegovina, Bulgaria, Croatia, Czech Republic, Estonia, Finland, Hungary, Kazakhstan, Latvia, Lithuania, Poland, Romania, Russia, Serbia, North Macedonia, Slovakia, Slovenia, and Ukraine.

Additionally, it operated online retail in 22 countries (Croatia, Czech Republic, Estonia, Germany, Hungary, Latvia, Lithuania, Poland, Romania, Russia, Serbia, North Macedonia, Slovakia, Slovenia, and Ukraine).

== Gallery ==
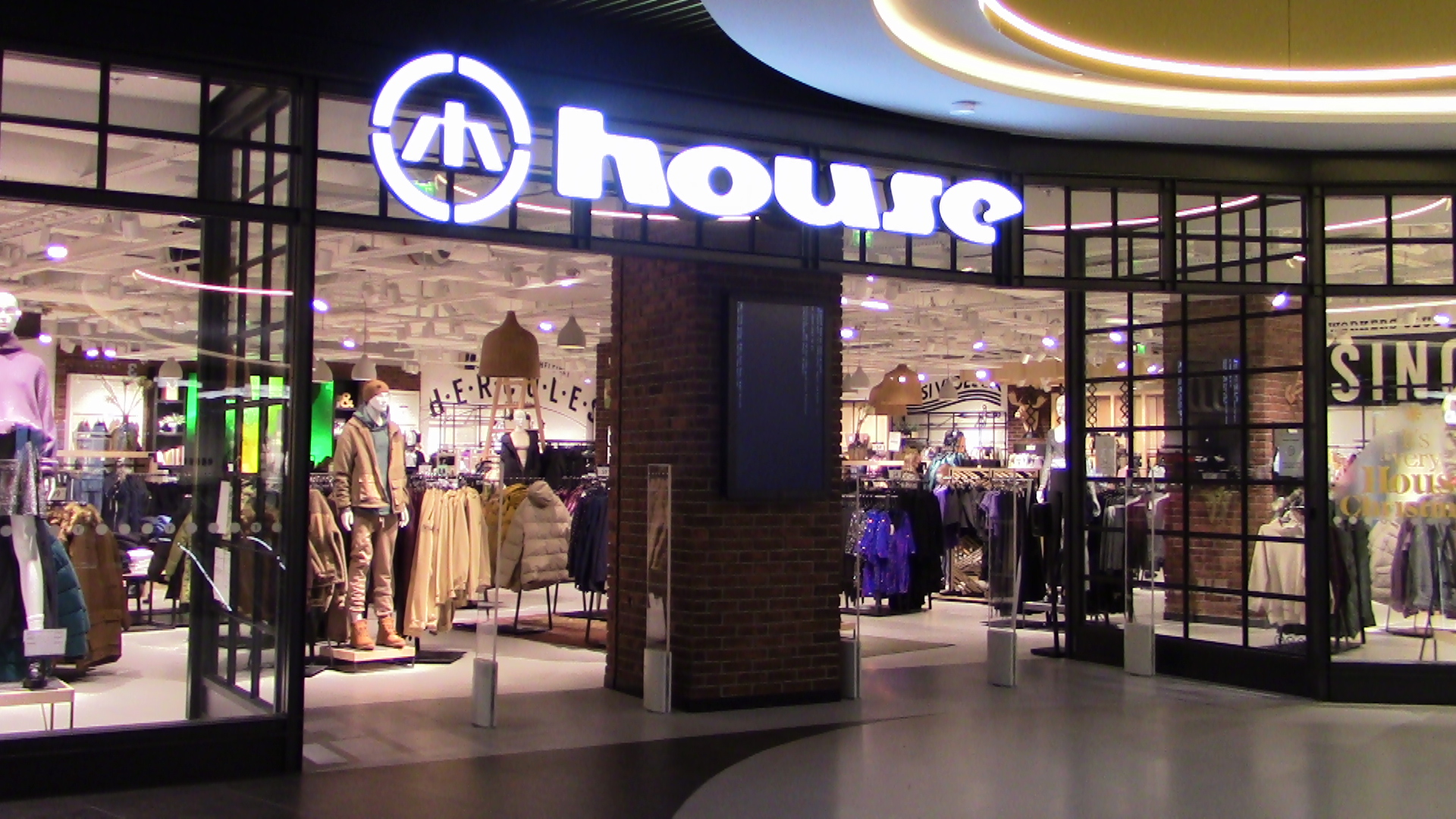
House store at the Mall of Tripla in Helsinki, Finland in 2021.

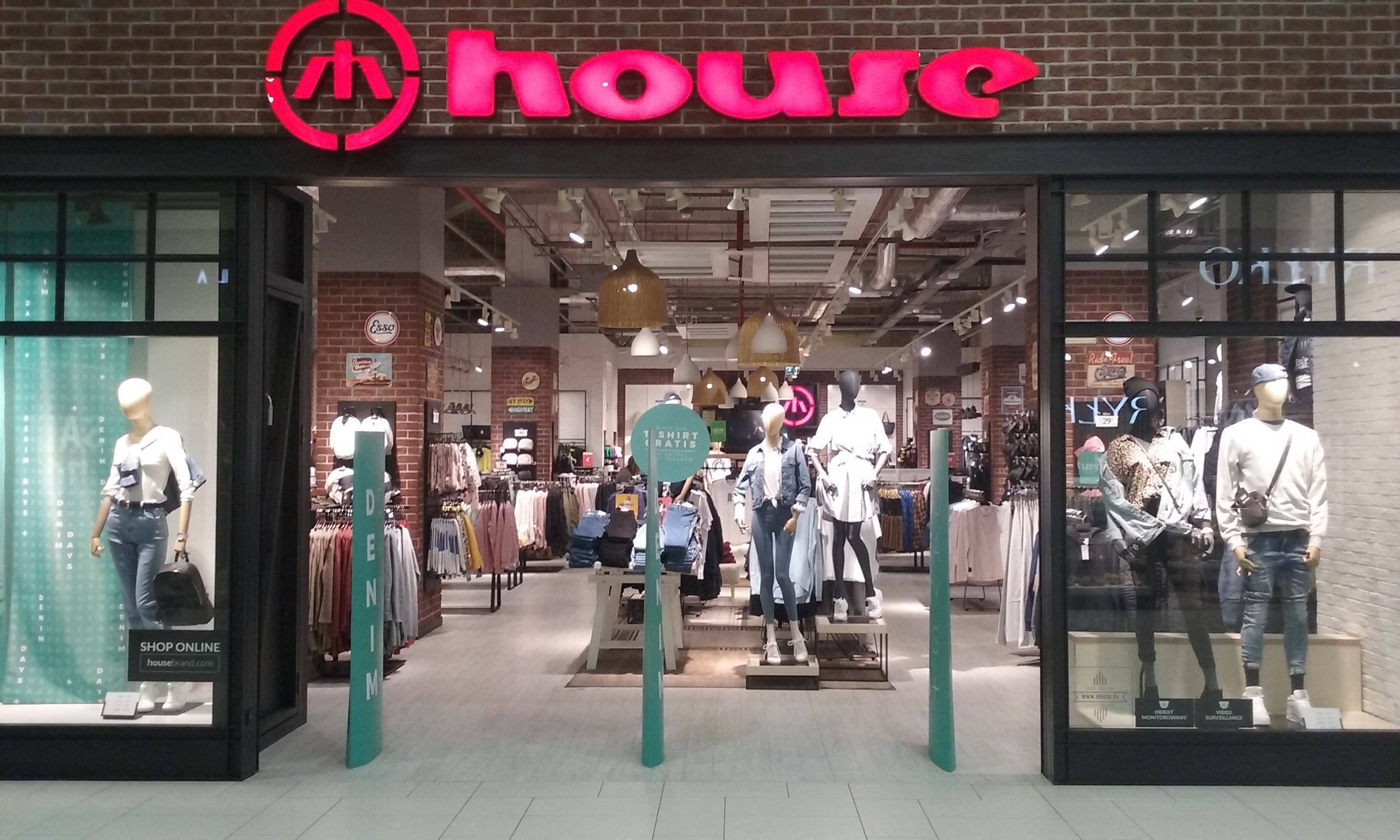
House store in a shopping centre in Tomaszów Mazowiecki, Poland, in 2019.

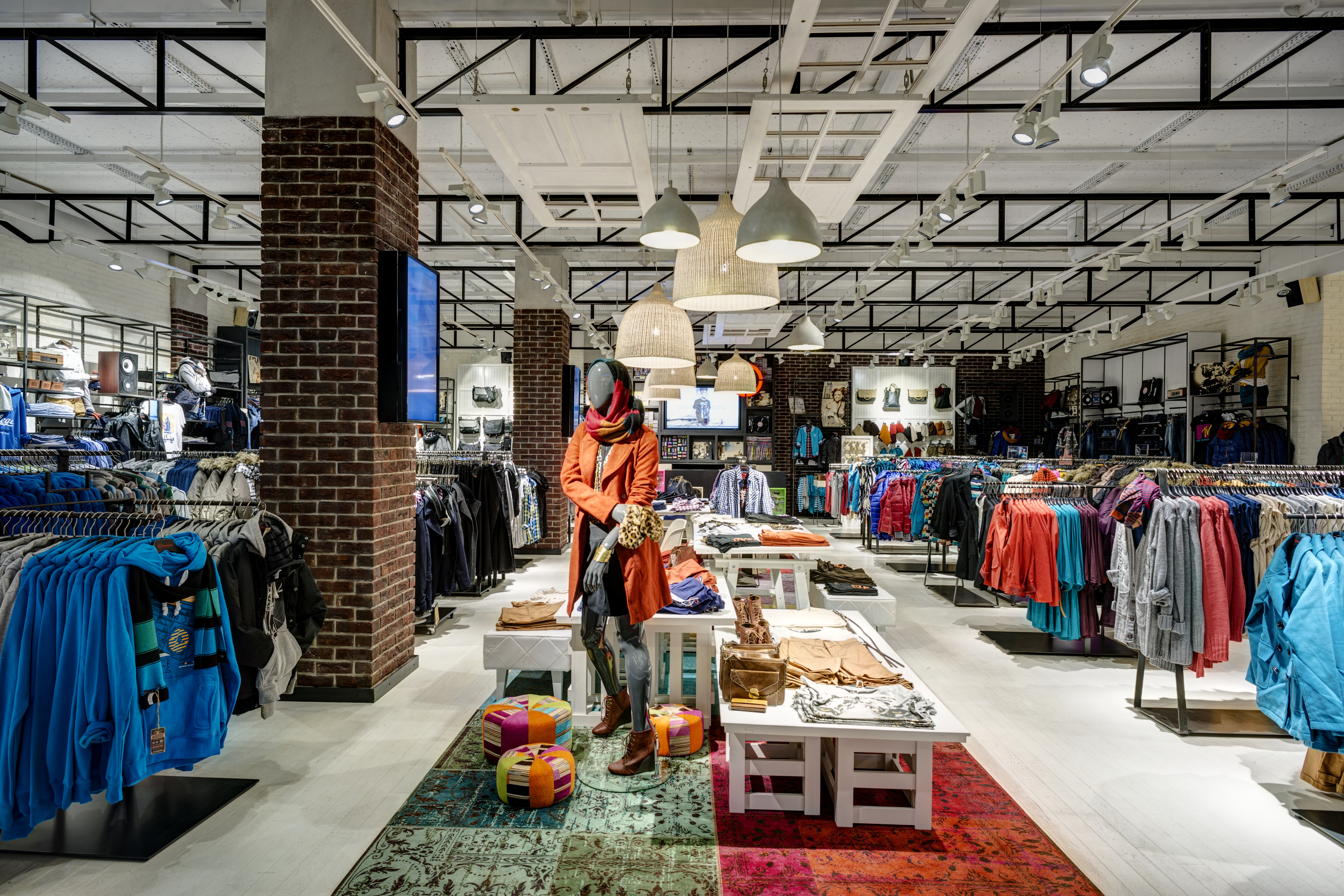
The interior of a House store in 2012.

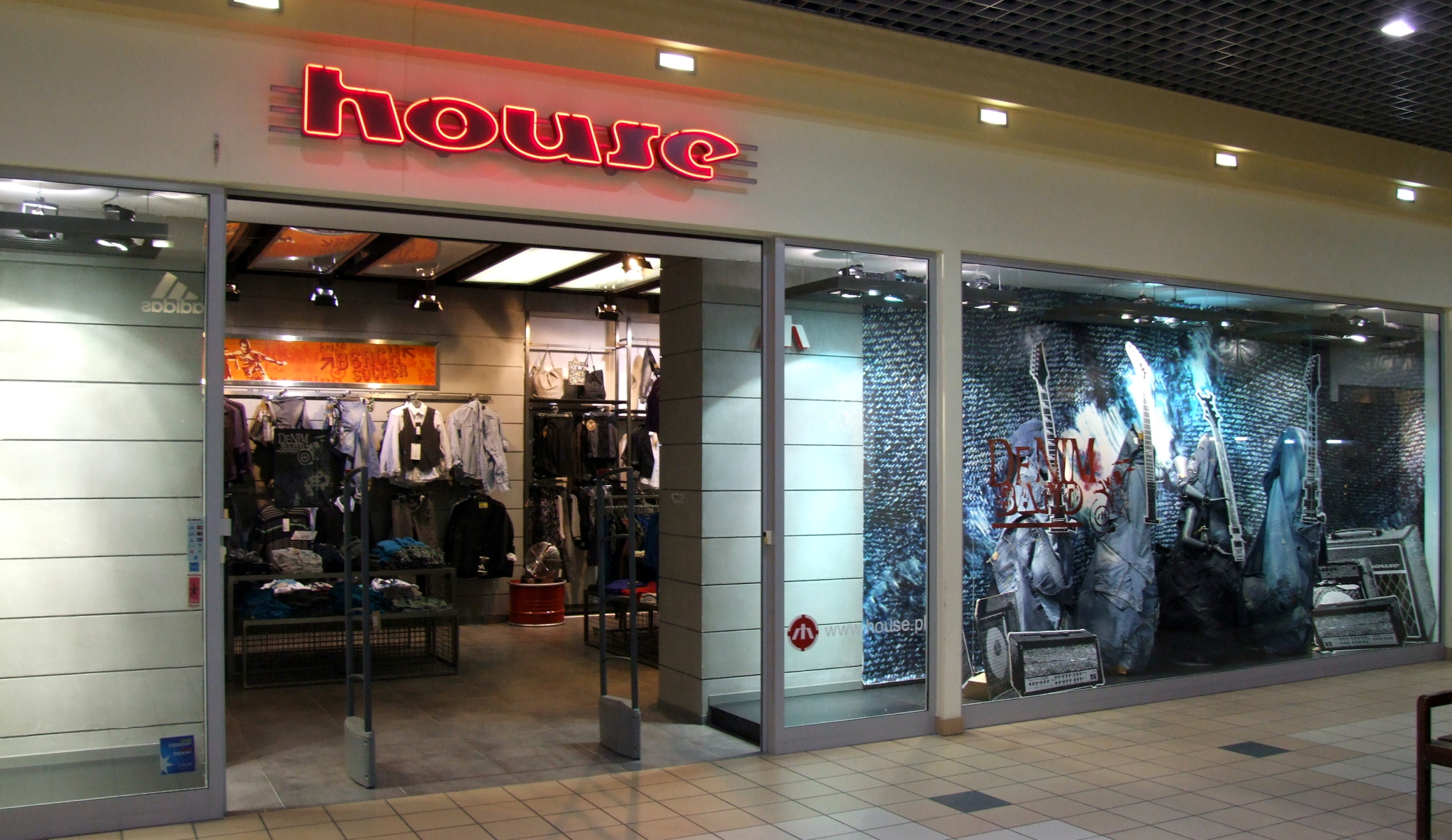
House store in Ostrowiec Świętokrzyski, Poland, in 2010.
