= Cropp (brand) =

Polish clothing company

- Industry: Retailer
- Founded: 2004
- Headquarters: Gdańsk, Poland
- Number of locations: 374 (2024)
- Area served: Europe
- Products: Clothing; Accessories
- Owner: LPP
- Website: cropp.com

Cropp (formerly: Cropp Town) is a clothing brand and retailer chain, established in 2004, and owned by the LPP, that is specialized in the streetwear style of clothing. Its headquarters are located in Gdańsk, Poland. In 2024, company owned over 370 stores in Europe. Additionally, it operates online retail in 19 countries.

Cropp launched a shopping app for iOS and Android in October 2024. The app offers access to collections, personalized recommendations, transaction history, returns, and integration with in-store services. The app is scheduled to launch in Poland, the Czech Republic, and Romania by the end of 2025.

== Stores ==
In 2024, the company owned 374 stores in Europe, located in 18 countries, including stores in Poland, and in other countries such as Belarus, Bosnia and Herzegovina, Bulgaria, Croatia, Czech Republic, Estonia, Finland, Hungary, Kazakhstan, Latvia, Lithuania, Pakistan, Romania, Serbia, North Macedonia, Slovakia, Slovenia, and Ukraine.

== Gallery ==
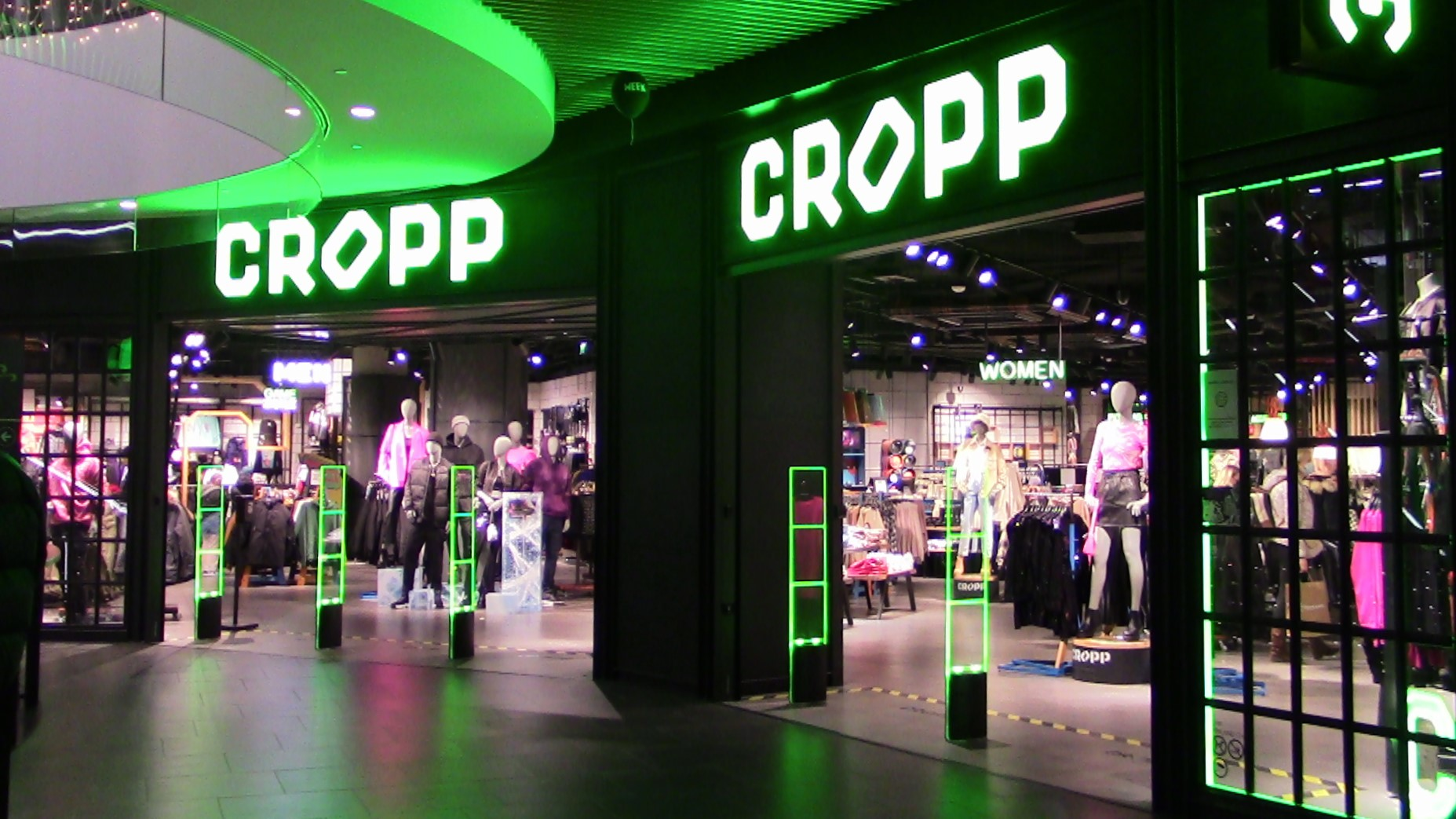
Cropp store at Mall of Tripla in Helsinki, Finland.

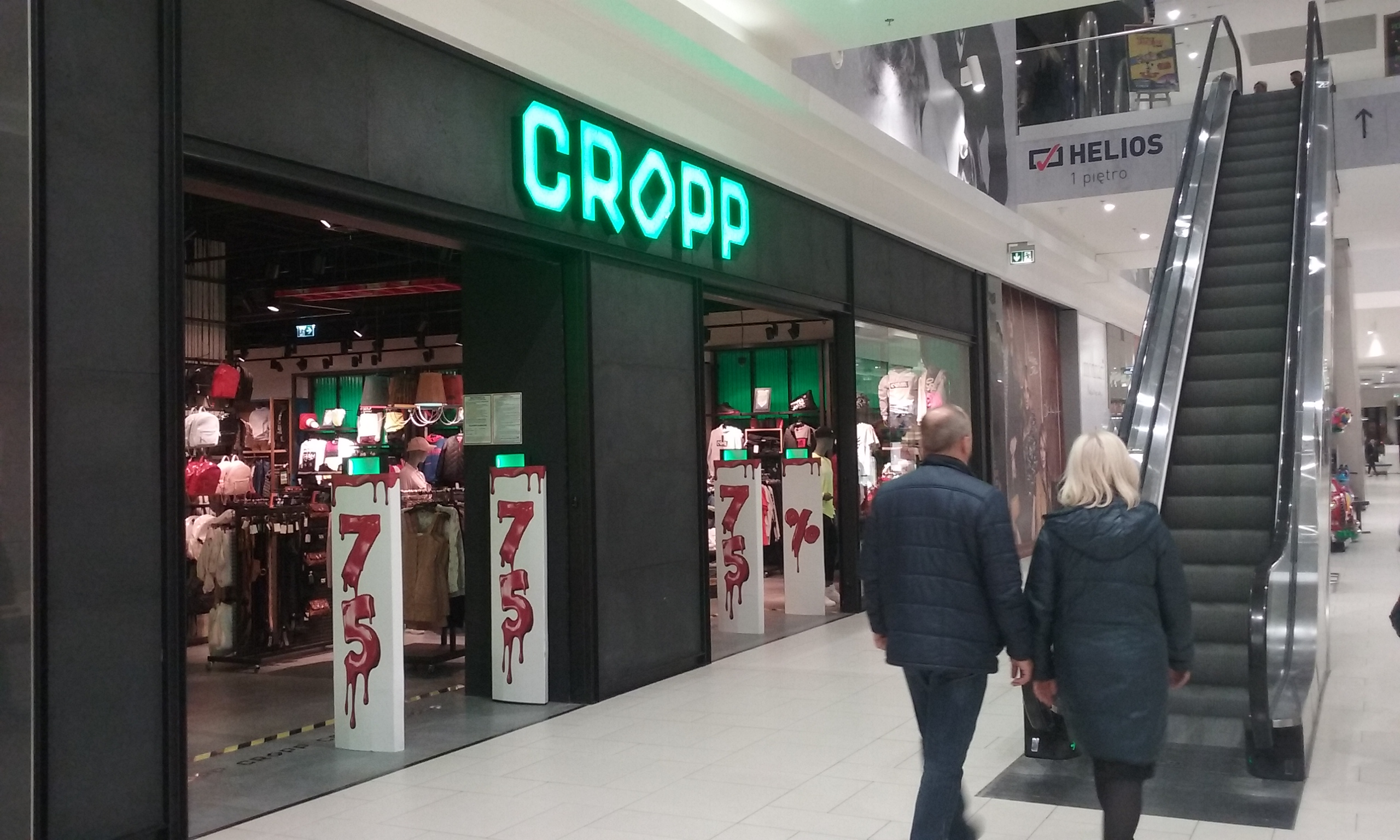
Cropp store in a shopping centre in Tomaszów Mazowiecki, Poland.

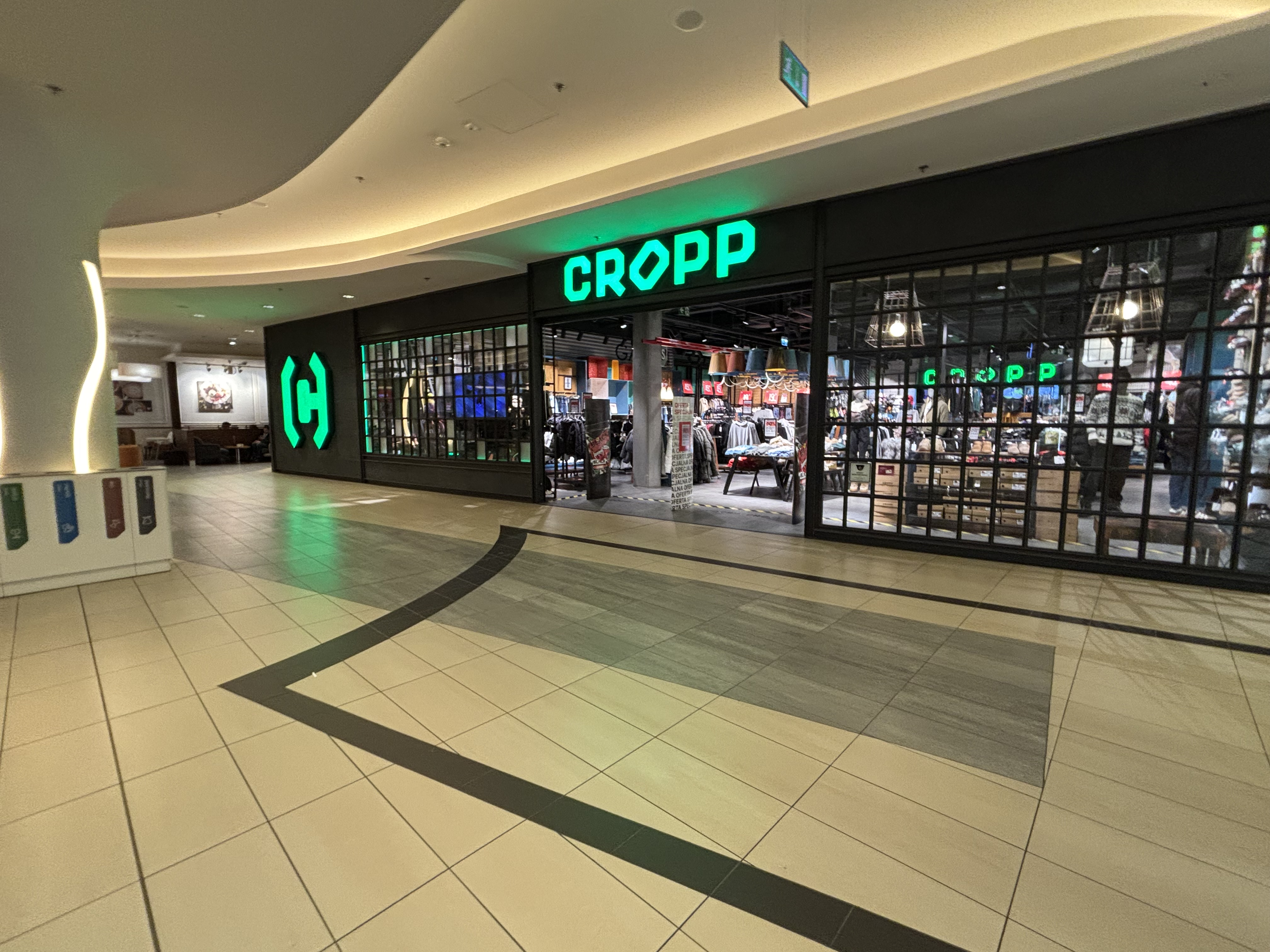
Cropp store in a shopping centre in Olsztyn, Poland.
