= 2002–03 FC Barcelona season =

104th season in existence of FC Barcelona

Barcelona
2002–03 season
- President: Joan Gaspart (until 12 February 2003); Enric Reyna (until 6 May 2003); Managing Commission (until 15 June); Joan Laporta
- Head Coach: Louis van Gaal (until 27 January 2003); Antonio de la Cruz (until 2 February 2003); Radomir Antić
- Stadium: Camp Nou
- La Liga: 6th
- Copa del Rey: First round
- UEFA Champions League: Quarter-finals
- Top goalscorer: League: Patrick Kluivert (16); All: Patrick Kluivert (21)
Home colours	Away colours	Third colours

During the 2002–03 season, Barcelona competed in La Liga, the Copa del Rey, and the UEFA Champions League. The club's top scorer was Patrick Kluivert, with 21 goals.

== Season summary ==
The 2002–03 season was the final year of president Joan Gaspart's reign. It was also his least successful at Barcelona, with the club changing manager three times during the course of the season, disrupting the league campaign. The club eventually finished in sixth place in La Liga, which was Barça's worst position in 15 years. In the Copa del Rey, the side failed to get past the round of 32. In Europe, however, they fared slightly better, reaching the quarter-finals of the UEFA Champions League and setting a competition record for the most consecutive wins, with 11. Overall, the team's form was poor all season, which spurred wholesale changes in management, the board and squad of players.

== Squad ==
Squad at end of season

Note: Flags indicate national team as defined under FIFA eligibility rules; some limited exceptions apply. Players may hold more than one non-FIFA nationality.

No.	Pos.	Nation	Player
1	GK	ARG	Roberto Bonano
2	DF	NED	Michael Reiziger
3	DF	NED	Frank de Boer
4	DF	SWE	Patrik Andersson
5	DF	ESP	Carles Puyol
6	MF	ESP	Xavi
7	FW	ARG	Javier Saviola
8	MF	NED	Phillip Cocu
9	FW	NED	Patrick Kluivert
10	MF	ARG	Juan Román Riquelme
11	MF	NED	Marc Overmars
12	DF	FRA	Philippe Christanval
14	MF	ESP	Gerard
15	MF	BRA	Fábio Rochemback
17	MF	ESP	Gaizka Mendieta

No.	Pos.	Nation	Player
18	MF	ESP	Gabri
19	FW	ESP	Dani García
20	DF	ARG	Juan Pablo Sorín
21	MF	ESP	Luis Enrique (captain)
25	GK	GER	Robert Enke
26	GK	ESP	Víctor Valdés
31	MF	BRA	Thiago Motta
33	DF	ESP	Dani Tortolero
32	DF	ESP	Oleguer
34	MF	ESP	Andrés Iniesta
35	DF	ESP	Fernando Navarro
36	MF	ESP	David Sánchez
38	MF	ESP	Nano
39	FW	ESP	Sergio García
40	DF	ESP	Óscar López

=== Transfers ===
==== In ====
No.	Pos.	Nat.	Name	Age	EU	Moving from	Type	Transfer window	Ends	Transfer fee	Source
25	GK	(Germany)	Enke	24	EU	Benfica (Portugal)	Transfer ✓	Summer	2004	Free	
10	MF	(Argentina)	Riquelme	24	Non-EU	Boca Juniors (Argentina)	Transfer ✓	Summer	2006	€10M	
20	DF	(Argentina)	Sorín	26	EU	Cruzeiro (Brazil)	Loan →	Winter	2003	Loan	
17	MF	(Spain)	Mendieta	29	EU	Lazio (Italy)	Loan →	Summer	2003	€1,5M	

Total spending: ▼€15,500,000

==== Out ====
No.	Pos.	Nat.	Name	Age	EU	Moving to	Type	Transfer window	Transfer fee	Source
37	MF	(Spain)	Arteta	21	EU	Rangers (Scotland)	Transfer ✓	Summer	€7,9M	
25	GK	(France)	Dutruel	30	EU	Alavés	Transfer ✓	Summer	€2,9M	
13	GK	(Spain)	Reina	20	EU	Villarreal	Transfer ✓	Summer	€0,75M	
10	FW	(Brazil)	Rivaldo	31	EU	Milan (Italy)	Transfer ✓	Summer	Free	
5	DF	(Spain)	Abelardo	33	EU	Alavés	Transfer ✓	Summer	Free	
12	DF	(Spain)	Sergi	31	EU	Atlético Madrid	Transfer ✓	Summer	Free	
36	MF	(Spain)	Luis García	25	EU	Atlético Madrid	Transfer ✓	Summer	€3,6M	
22	FW	(Brazil)	Geovanni	23	EU	Benfica (Portugal)	Loan →	Winter	Loan	
20	FW	(Spain)	Alfonso	30	EU	Betis	Loan →	Summer	Loan	

Total income: ▲€15,150,000

Last updated: 3 October

== Competitions ==
=== Pre-season and friendlies ===
28-07-2002 Friendly. Grenoble 1–0 Barcelona

30-07-2002 Friendly. Servette 1–4 Barcelona

02-08-2002 Amsterdam Tournament. Barcelona 4–2 Parma

04-08-2002 Amsterdam Tournament. Ajax 4–3 Barcelona

07-08-2002 Friendly. Newcastle United 0–3 Barcelona

23-08-2002 Joan Gamper Trophy. Barcelona 1–0 Red Star Belgrade

29-01-2003 Friendly. Benfica 0–1 Barcelona

04-02-2003 Friendly. Cádiz 1–2 Barcelona

05-03-2003 Friendly. Llorca 1–4 Barcelona

02-04-2003 Friendly. Barcelona 5–0 Al-Ittihad

08-05-2003 Copa Catalunya (semi-final). Terrassa 1–1 Barcelona Penalties (4–2)

=== La Liga ===
==== League table ====
Pos	Team	Pld	W	D	L	GF	GA	GD	Pts	Qualification or relegation
4	Celta Vigo	38	17	10	11	45	36	+9	61	Qualification for the Champions League third qualifying round
5	Valencia	38	17	9	12	56	35	+21	60	Qualification for the UEFA Cup first round
6	Barcelona	38	15	11	12	63	47	+16	56	Qualification for the UEFA Cup first round
7	Athletic Bilbao	38	15	10	13	63	61	+2	55	
8	Real Betis	38	14	12	12	56	53	+3	54	

Source: LFP
Rules for classification: 1st points; 2nd head-to-head points; 3rd head-to-head goal difference; 4th head-to-head away goals scored; 5th goal difference; 6th number of goals scored; 7th Fair-play points

==== Results by round ====
Round	1	2	3	4	5	6	7	8	9	10	11	12	13	14	15	16	17	18	19	20	21	22	23	24	25	26	27	28	29	30	31	32	33	34	35	36	37	38
Ground	H	A	H	A	H	A	H	A	H	A	H	A	A	H	A	H	A	H	A	A	H	A	H	A	H	A	H	A	H	A	H	H	A	H	A	H	A	H
Result	D	W	W	L	D	L	W	D	W	L	D	L	L	L	W	W	D	L	L	L	D	W	W	D	D	D	W	L	L	D	W	W	D	L	W	W	W	W
Position	12	7	5	8	8	11	8	8	6	10	10	10	10	13	10	8	9	10	12	15	15	11	8	9	9	9	9	9	12	12	12	8	7	8	7	7	7	6

Source: Competitive Matches
A = Away; H = Home; W = Win; D = Draw; L = Loss; = Leader, 2003-04 UEFA Champions League group stage; = 2003-04 UEFA Champions League group stage; = 2003-04 UEFA Champions League qualifying round; = 2003-04 UEFA Cup; = 2003-04 Segunda Division

==== Matches ====
1 September 2002 1	Barcelona	2–2	Atlético Madrid	Barcelona
21:00 CEST	Luis Enrique 5', 55'	Report	Otero 45'; Correa 86'	Stadium: Camp Nou

14 September 2002 2	Athletic Bilbao	0–2	Barcelona	Bilbao
21:30 CEST		Report	Luis Enrique 21'; Saviola 36'	Stadium: San Mamés

21 September 2002 3	Barcelona	2–0	Espanyol	Barcelona
21:00 CEST	Kluivert 58'; Luis Enrique 70'	Report		Stadium: Camp Nou

28 September 2002 4	Real Betis	3–0	Barcelona	Huelva
21:30 CEST	Alfonso 26' (pen.); Joaquín 66'; Varela 83'	Report		Stadium: Nuevo Colombino

6 October 2002 5	Barcelona	2–2	Osasuna	Barcelona
19:00 CEST	Motta 39'; Kluivert 47'	Report	Rivero 2'; Gancedo 45'	Stadium: Camp Nou

20 October 2002 6	Real Valladolid	2–1	Barcelona	Valladolid
20:30 CEST	Aganzo 53'; Pachón 86'	Report	Saviola 90'	Stadium: José Zorrilla

26 October 2002 7	Barcelona	6–1	Alavés	Barcelona
21:00 CEST	Kluivert 16', 27', 80'; Mendieta 35' (pen.); Luis Enrique 41'; Xavi 65'	Report	Begoña 55'	Stadium: Camp Nou

3 November 2002 8	Racing Santander	1–1	Barcelona	Santander
20:30 CET	Javi Guerrero 1'	Report	Navarro 84'	Stadium: El Sardinero

9 November 2002 9	Barcelona	1–0	Villarreal	Barcelona
21:15 CET	Riquelme 75' (pen.)	Report		Stadium: Camp Nou

16 November 2002 10	Deportivo La Coruña	2–0	Barcelona	A Coruña
21:30 CET	Scaloni 82'; Luque 86'	Report		Stadium: Riazor

23 November 2002 11	Barcelona	0–0	Real Madrid	Barcelona
21:00 CET		Report		Stadium: Camp Nou

1 December 2002 12	Real Sociedad	2–1	Barcelona	San Sebastián
19:00 CET	Kovačević 39', 53'	Report	Kluivert 33'	Stadium: Anoeta

7 December 2002 13	Rayo Vallecano	1–0	Barcelona	Madrid
20:00 CET	Azkoitia 64'	Report		Stadium: Teresa Rivero

15 December 2002 14	Barcelona	0–3	Sevilla	Barcelona
20:30 CET		Report	Casquero 4' (pen.); Toedtli 77', 89'	Stadium: Camp Nou

21 December 2002 15	Mallorca	0–4	Barcelona	Palma
21:30 CET		Report	Kluivert 25', 48', 51'; Overmars 44'	Stadium: Son Moix

5 January 2003 16	Barcelona	3–0	Recreativo Huelva	Barcelona
17:00 CET	Rochemback 8'; Loren 25' (o.g.); Cocu 80'	Report		Stadium: Camp Nou

12 January 2003 17	Málaga	0–0	Barcelona	Málaga
20:30 CET		Report		Stadium: La Rosaleda

18 January 2003 18	Barcelona	2–4	Valencia	Barcelona
21:30 CET	Motta 38'; Kluivert 88'	Report	Aimar 13'; Carew 26'; Aurélio 82'; Rufete 87'	Stadium: Camp Nou

26 January 2003 19	Celta Vigo	2–0	Barcelona	Vigo
20:30 CET	Jesuli 47'; Sylvinho 72'	Report		Stadium: Balaídos

1 February 2003 20	Atlético Madrid	3–0	Barcelona	Madrid
21:30 CET	Torres 40'; Emerson 70'; L. García 87'	Report		Stadium: Vicente Calderón

9 February 2003 21	Barcelona	2–2	Athletic Bilbao	Barcelona
20:30 CET	Saviola 5'; Overmars 41'	Report	Ezquerro 48' (pen.); Yeste 55'	Stadium: Camp Nou

15 February 2003 22	Espanyol	0–2	Barcelona	Barcelona
20:00 CET		Report	Cocu 40'; Xavi 42'	Stadium: Olímpic Lluís Companys

22 February 2003 23	Barcelona	4–0	Real Betis	Barcelona
21:30 CET	Saviola 2', 41', 54'; Cocu 6'	Report		Stadium: Camp Nou

2 March 2003 24	Osasuna	2–2	Barcelona	Pamplona
17:00 CET	Rosado 79'; Rivero 90'	Report	Saviola 61'; Luis Enrique 86'	Stadium: El Sadar

8 March 2003 25	Barcelona	1–1	Real Valladolid	Barcelona
21:00 CET	Gómez 28' (o.g.)	Report	Bonano 47' (o.g.)	Stadium: Camp Nou

16 March 2003 26	Alavés	0–0	Barcelona	Vitoria-Gasteiz
19:00 CET		Report		Stadium: Mendizorroza

23 March 2003 27	Barcelona	6–1	Racing Santander	Barcelona
19:00 CET	Kluivert 1', 29'; Riquelme 8'; Overmars 81', 83'; Mendieta 89' (pen.)	Report	Javi Guerrero 47'	Stadium: Camp Nou

5 April 2003 28	Villarreal	2–0	Barcelona	Vilarreal
20:45 CEST	López 56' (pen.); Calleja 90' (pen.)	Report		Stadium: El Madrigal

12 April 2003 29	Barcelona	2–4	Deportivo La Coruña	Barcelona
21:30 CEST	Saviola 2'; Motta 24'	Report	Scaloni 16'; Makaay 50', 64'; Sergio 75'	Stadium: Camp Nou

19 April 2003 30	Real Madrid	1–1	Barcelona	Madrid
21:30 CEST	Ronaldo 15'	Report	Luis Enrique 31'	Stadium: Santiago Bernabéu

27 April 2003 31	Barcelona	2–1	Real Sociedad	Barcelona
20:30 CEST	Saviola 13'; Kluivert 24'	Report	Kahveci 80'	Stadium: Camp Nou

4 May 2003 32	Barcelona	3–0	Rayo Vallecano	Barcelona
19:30 CEST	Luis Enrique 70'; Overmars 77'; Saviola 89'	Report		Stadium: Camp Nou

11 May 2003 33	Sevilla	0–0	Barcelona	Seville
21:00 CEST		Report		Stadium: Ramón Sánchez Pizjuán

18 May 2003 34	Barcelona	1–2	Mallorca	Barcelona
21:00 CEST	Kluivert 72'	Report	Novo 22'; Carlitos 86'	Stadium: Camp Nou

25 May 2003 35	Recreativo Huelva	1–3	Barcelona	Huelva
19:00 CEST	Joãozinho 88'	Report	Saviola 41'; Kluivert 53'; Riquelme 85'	Stadium: Nuevo Colombino

1 June 2003 36	Barcelona	2–1	Málaga	Barcelona
19:30 CEST	Saviola 24'; Mendieta 67' (pen.)	Report	Dely Valdés 59' (pen.)	Stadium: Camp Nou

15 June 2003 37	Valencia	1–3	Barcelona	Valencia
21:00 CEST	Sánchez 87' (pen.)	Report	Mendieta 43' (pen.); Kluivert 70' (pen.); Overmars 79'	Stadium: Mestalla

22 June 2003 38	Barcelona	2–0	Celta Vigo	Barcelona
21:00 CEST	Sorín 6'; Saviola 50'	Report		Stadium: Camp Nou

=== Copa del Rey ===
==== Round of 64 ====
11 September 2002	Novelda CF	3–2	Barcelona	Novelda
00:00 CEST	Madrigal 59', 65', 79'	Report	Geovanni 7'; Riquelme 68' (pen.)	Stadium: Estadio La Magdalena

=== UEFA Champions League ===
==== Third qualifying round ====
14 August 2002	Barcelona (Spain)	3–0	(Poland) Legia Warsaw	Barcelona
21:30	De Boer 8'; Riquelme 80'; Cocu 90+3'	Report		Stadium: Camp Nou; Referee: (Czech Republic) Michal Benes

28 August 2002	Legia Warsaw (Poland)	0–1	(Spain) Barcelona	Warsaw
19:00		Report	Mendieta 68' (pen.)	Stadium: Polish Army Stadium; Referee: (Italy) Alfredo Trentalange

==== First group stage ====
===== Group H =====
Team	Pld	W	D	L	GF	GA	GD	Pts	BAR	LKM	BRU	GAL
(Spain) Barcelona	6	6	0	0	13	4	+9	18		1–0	3–2	3–1
(Russia) Lokomotiv Moscow	6	2	1	3	5	7	−2	7	1–3		2–0	0–2
(Belgium) Club Brugge	6	1	2	3	5	7	−2	5	0–1	0–0		3–1
(Turkey) Galatasaray	6	1	1	4	5	10	−5	4	0–2	1–2	0–0	

Legend: Blue = home team win; Yellow = draw; Red = away team win.

18 September 2002	Barcelona (Spain)	3–2	(Belgium) Club Brugge	Camp Nou, Barcelona
20:45	Luis Enrique 5'; Mendieta 40'; Saviola 44'	Report	Simons 22' (pen.); Englebert 85'	Referee: Helmut Fleischer (Germany)

24 September 2002	Galatasaray (Turkey)	0–2	(Spain) Barcelona	Ali Sami Yen Stadium, Istanbul
20:45		Report	Kluivert 27'; Luis Enrique 59'	Referee: Domenico Messina (Italy)

1 October 2002	Lokomotiv Moscow (Russia)	1–3	(Spain) Barcelona	Lokomotiv Stadium, Moscow
18:00	Obiorah 56'	Report	Kluivert 29'; Saviola 32', 49'	Referee: Thomas McCurry (Scotland)

23 October 2002	Barcelona (Spain)	1–0	(Russia) Lokomotiv Moscow	Camp Nou, Barcelona
20:45	De Boer 76'	Report		Referee: Alain Hamer (Luxembourg)

29 October 2002	Club Brugge (Belgium)	0–1	(Spain) Barcelona	Jan Breydel Stadium, Bruges
20:45		Report	Riquelme 64'	Referee: Graham Poll (England)

13 November 2002	Barcelona (Spain)	3–1	(Turkey) Galatasaray	Camp Nou, Barcelona
19:15	Dani 10'; Gerard 44'; Geovanni 56'	Report	Haspolatlı 20'	Referee: Dick van Egmond (Netherlands)

==== Second group stage ====
===== Group A =====
Team	Pld	W	D	L	GF	GA	GD	Pts	BAR	INT	NEW	LEV
(Spain) Barcelona	6	5	1	0	12	2	+10	16		3–0	3–1	2–0
(Italy) Inter Milan	6	3	2	1	11	8	+3	11	0–0		2–2	3–2
(England) Newcastle United	6	2	1	3	10	13	−3	7	0–2	1–4		3–1
(Germany) Bayer Leverkusen	6	0	0	6	5	15	−10	0	1–2	0–2	1–3	

Legend: Blue = home team win; Yellow = draw; Red = away team win.

27 November 2002	Bayer Leverkusen (Germany)	1–2	(Spain) Barcelona	BayArena, Leverkusen
20:45	Berbatov 39'	Report	Saviola 48'; Overmars 88'	Attendance: 20,000; Referee: Kyros Vassaras (Greece)

11 December 2002	Barcelona (Spain)	3–1	(England) Newcastle United	Camp Nou, Barcelona
20:45	Dani 7'; Kluivert 35'; Motta 58'	Report	Ameobi 24'	Attendance: 45,100; Referee: Frank De Bleeckere (Belgium)

18 February 2003	Barcelona (Spain)	3–0	(Italy) Inter Milan	Camp Nou, Barcelona
20:45	Saviola 7'; Cocu 29'; Kluivert 67'	Report		Attendance: 80,000; Referee: Anders Frisk (Sweden)

26 February 2003	Inter Milan (Italy)	0–0	(Spain) Barcelona	Stadio Giuseppe Meazza, Milan
20:45		Report		Attendance: 71,740; Referee: Urs Meier (Switzerland)

11 March 2003	Barcelona (Spain)	2–0	(Germany) Bayer Leverkusen	Camp Nou, Barcelona
20:45	Saviola 17'; De Boer 49'	Report		Attendance: 62,228; Referee: Stéphane Bré (France)

19 March 2003	Newcastle United (England)	0–2	(Spain) Barcelona	St James' Park, Newcastle
20:45		Report	Kluivert 60'; Motta 75'	Attendance: 51,884; Referee: Jan Wegereef (Netherlands)

==== Quarter-finals ====
9 April 2003	Juventus (Italy)	1–1	(Spain) Barcelona	Stadio delle Alpi, Turin
20:45	Montero 16'	Report	Saviola 78'	Attendance: 48,783; Referee: Ľuboš Micheľ (Slovakia)

22 April 2003	Barcelona (Spain)	1–2 (a.e.t.)	(Italy) Juventus	Camp Nou, Barcelona
20:45	Xavi 66'	Report	Nedvěd 53'; Zalayeta 114'	Attendance: 98,000; Referee: Graham Poll (England)

== Statistics ==
=== Players statistics ===
No.	Pos	Nat	Player	Total		La Liga		Copa del Rey		Champions League	
No.	Pos	Nat	Player	Apps	Goals	Apps	Goals	Apps	Goals	Apps	Goals
1	GK	(Argentina) ARG	Bonano	32	-35	24	-30	0	0	8	-5
18	DF	(Spain) ESP	Gabri	37	0	22+5	0	1	0	8+1	0
3	DF	(Netherlands) NED	de Boer	50	3	35	0	1	0	14	3
5	DF	(Spain) ESP	Puyol	46	0	32	0	0	0	14	0
20	DF	(Argentina) ARG	Sorin	15	1	14+1	1	0	0		
17	MF	(Spain) ESP	Mendieta	49	6	29+4	4	0+1	0	10+5	2
8	MF	(Netherlands) NED	Cocu	42	5	32	3	0	0	10	2
6	MF	(Spain) ESP	Xavi	44	3	29	2	1	0	14	1
11	MF	(Netherlands) NED	Overmars	32	7	20+6	6	0	0	5+1	1
9	FW	(Netherlands) NED	Kluivert	51	21	36	16	0	0	14+1	5
7	FW	(Argentina) ARG	Saviola	51	20	29+7	13	0+1	0	12+2	7
26	GK	(Spain) ESP	Valdes	20	-18	14	-15	0	0	6	-3
31	MF	(Brazil) BRA	Motta	35	5	18+3	3	1	0	12+1	2
2	DF	(Netherlands) NED	Reiziger	31	0	17+4	0	1	0	9	0
10	MF	(Argentina) ARG	Riquelme	42	6	14+16	3	1	1	6+5	2
21	MF	(Spain) ESP	Luis Enrique	26	10	14+4	8	0	0	6+2	2
35	DF	(Spain) ESP	Navarro	23	1	13	1	1	0	9	0
15	MF	(Brazil) BRA	Rochemback	30	1	7+14	1	1	0	4+4	0
14	MF	(Spain) ESP	Gerard	29	1	5+16	0	1	0	2+5	1
34	MF	(Spain) ESP	Iniesta	9	0	5+1	0	0	0	1+2	0
12	DF	(France) FRA	Christanval	8	0	4+1	0	0	0	1+2	0
19	FW	(Spain) ESP	Dani García	12	2	3+5	0	0	0	3+1	2
4	DF	(Sweden) SWE	Andersson	7	0	2+1	0	0	0	3+1	0
40	DF	(Spain) ESP	López	2	0	2	0				
32	DF	(Spain) ESP	Oleguer	5	0	1+2	0	0	0	0+2	0
22	MF	(Brazil) BRA	Geovanni	11	2	0+5	0	1	1	2+3	1
25	GK	(Germany) GER	Enke	4	-6	0+1	-2	1	-3	2	-1
33	DF	(Spain) ESP	Tortolero	2	0	0	0	0	0	1+1	0
36	MF	(Spain) ESP	Sánchez	1	0	0	0	0	0	0+1	0
38	MF	(Spain) ESP	Nano	3	0	0+3	0				
39	FW	(Spain) ESP	García	2	0	0	0	0	0	0+2	0

- Source: https://www.bdfutbol.com/en/t/t2002-0336.html?tab=partits

== See also ==
- FC Barcelona
- 2002–03 UEFA Champions League
- 2002–03 La Liga
