= 2003–04 FC Barcelona season =

105th season in existence of FC Barcelona

Barcelona
2003–04 season
- President: Joan Laporta
- Head Coach: Frank Rijkaard
- Stadium: Camp Nou
- La Liga: 2nd
- Copa del Rey: Quarter-finals
- UEFA Cup: Fourth round
- Top goalscorer: League: Ronaldinho (15); All: Ronaldinho (22)
Home colours	Away colours	Third colours

During the 2003–04 Spanish football season, Barcelona competed in La Liga, Copa del Rey and UEFA Cup.

== Season summary ==
After the disappointment of the Joan Gaspart era, the combination of a new young president Joan Laporta and a new manager, former Dutch and Milan star Frank Rijkaard, saw Barcelona bounce back. Guided by new management off the pitch and the likes of future FIFA World Player of the Year Ronaldinho on the pitch, Barça achieved second place behind Valencia in the league.

Barcelona competed in the UEFA Cup rather than the UEFA Champions League for the first time since the 1995–96 season, given their sixth-place finish in 2002–03.

The BBC made a documentary, titled FC Barcelona Confidential, based on the turn of events in the league after Joan Laporta's entry. With his arrival, the club experienced a new style of management that returned the club into a positive cycle, with an inherited massive financial debt crisis was resolved. The season saw Barcelona's spectacular return to form, finishing second after being at the bottom of the table.

== Squad ==
Source Note: Flags indicate national team as defined under FIFA eligibility rules; some limited exceptions apply. Players may hold more than one non-FIFA nationality.

No.	Pos.	Nation	Player
1	GK	TUR	Rüştü Reçber
2	DF	NED	Michael Reiziger
3	MF	NED	Edgar Davids
4	DF	MEX	Rafael Márquez
5	DF	ESP	Carles Puyol
6	MF	ESP	Xavi
7	FW	ARG	Javier Saviola
8	MF	NED	Phillip Cocu
9	FW	NED	Patrick Kluivert
10	MF	BRA	Ronaldinho
11	MF	NED	Marc Overmars
12	DF	NED	Giovanni van Bronckhorst
14	MF	ESP	Gerard
16	DF	ESP	Mario

No.	Pos.	Nation	Player
18	MF	ESP	Gabri
20	MF	POR	Ricardo Quaresma
21	MF	ESP	Luis Enrique (captain)
22	MF	ESP	Luis García
23	MF	BRA	Thiago Motta
24	MF	ESP	Andrés Iniesta
25	GK	ESP	Víctor Valdés
26	MF	ESP	Ramón Ros
27	DF	ESP	Óscar López
28	GK	ESP	Albert Jorquera
32	DF	ESP	Oleguer
36	FW	ESP	Sergio García
37	MF	ESP	Sergio Santamaría

=== In ===
No.	Pos.	Nat.	Name	Age	EU	Moving from	Type	Transfer window	Ends	Transfer fee	Source
10	FW	(Brazil)	Ronaldinho	23	Non-EU	Paris Saint-Germain (France)	Transfer ✓	Summer	2008	€27M	
20	MF	(Portugal)	Ricardo Quaresma	19	EU	Sporting CP (Portugal)	Transfer ✓	Summer	N/A	€16.25M	
1	GK	(Turkey)	Rüştü	30	Non-EU	Fenerbahçe (Turkey)	Transfer ✓	Summer	2007	Free	
4	DF	(Mexico)	Márquez	24	EU	Monaco (France)	Transfer ✓	Summer	2007	€5.25M	
22	MF	(Spain)	Luis García	24	EU	Atlético Madrid	Transfer ✓	Summer	N/A	?	
12	DF	(Netherlands)	Giovanni van Bronckhorst	30	EU	Arsenal (England)	Loan →	Summer	2004	N/A	
3	MF	(Netherlands)	Davids	30	EU	Juventus (Italy)	Loan →	Winter	2004	€2M	
16	DF	(Spain)	Mario	21	EU	Valladolid	Loan →	Summer	2004	N/A	
24	MF	(Spain)	Andrés Iniesta	19	EU	Youth system	Promote	Summer	N/A	Free	
25	GK	(Spain)	Víctor Valdés	21	EU	Youth system	Promote	Summer	N/A	Free	
32	DF	(Spain)	Oleguer	23	EU	Youth system	Promote	Winter	N/A	Free	

Total spending: ▼€50.5 million

=== Out ===
No.	Pos.	Nat.	Name	Age	EU	Moving to	Type	Transfer window	Transfer fee	Source
34	MF	(Spain)	Fàbregas	16	EU	Arsenal (England)	Transfer ✓	Summer	€0.25M	
3	DF	(Netherlands)	de Boer	33	EU	Galatasaray (Turkey)	Contract termination ✗	Summer	Free	
1	GK	(Argentina)	Bonano	33	EU	Murcia	Transfer ✓	Summer	Free	
12	DF	(France)	Christanval	24	EU	Marseille (France)	Transfer ✓	Summer	Free	
20	FW	(Spain)	Alfonso	30	EU	Betis	Contract termination ✗	Summer	Free	
3	DF	(Sweden)	Andersson	31	EU	Malmö FF (Sweden)	Contract termination ✗	Winter	Free	
22	FW	(Brazil)	Geovanni	24	Non-EU	Benfica (Portugal)	Transfer ✓	Winter	Free	
10	MF	(Argentina)	Riquelme	25	Non-EU	Villarreal	Loan →	Summer	N/A	
15	MF	(Brazil)	Rochemback	22	Non-EU	Sporting CP (Portugal)	Loan →	Summer	€2.5M	
35	DF	(Spain)	Navarro	21	EU	Albacete	Loan →	Winter	N/A	
25	GK	(Germany)	Enke	25	EU	Fenerbahçe (Turkey)	Loan →	Summer	€0.4M	
27	MF	(Spain)	Trashorras	22	EU	Real Madrid	Transfer ✓	Summer	Free	
33	DF	(Spain)	Tortolero	21	EU	Elche	Transfer ✓	Summer	Free	

Total income: ▲€3.15 million |} Last updated: 1 October

== Competitions ==
=== La Liga ===
==== League table ====
Pos	Team	Pld	W	D	L	GF	GA	GD	Pts	Qualification or relegation
1	Valencia (C)	38	23	8	7	71	27	+44	77	Qualification for the Champions League group stage
2	Barcelona	38	21	9	8	63	39	+24	72	Qualification for the Champions League group stage
3	Deportivo La Coruña	38	21	8	9	60	34	+26	71	Qualification for the Champions League third qualifying round
4	Real Madrid	38	21	7	10	72	54	+18	70	Qualification for the Champions League third qualifying round
5	Athletic Bilbao	38	15	11	12	53	49	+4	56	Qualification for the UEFA Cup first round

Source: LFP
Rules for classification: 1st points; 2nd head-to-head points; 3rd head-to-head goal difference; 4th head-to-head goals scored; 5th goal difference; 6th number of goals scored; 7th Fair-play points
(C) Champions

==== Results by Round ====
Round	1	2	3	4	5	6	7	8	9	10	11	12	13	14	15	16	17	18	19	20	21	22	23	24	25	26	27	28	29	30	31	32	33	34	35	36	37	38
Ground	A	H	A	H	A	H	H	A	H	A	H	A	H	A	H	A	H	A	H	H	A	H	A	H	A	A	H	A	H	H	A	A	H	A	H	A	H	A
Result	W	D	W	D	D	L	L	W	W	D	W	L	D	L	L	W	D	L	W	D	W	W	W	W	W	W	W	W	W	D	W	D	W	W	W	L	W	L
Position	4	5	3	3	6	9	11	7	5	5	4	5	5	8	11	7	9	12	7	7	7	5	4	4	4	4	4	3	3	4	3	4	3	3	3	3	2	2

Updated to match(es) played on 2008-07-16. Source: LFP.com
A = Away; H = Home; W = Win; D = Draw; L = Loss; = Leader, 2004-05 UEFA Champions League Group stage; = 2004-05 UEFA Champions League Group stage; = 2004-05 UEFA Champions League Qualifying round; = 2004-05 UEFA Cup; = 2004-05 Segunda Division

==== Matches ====
30 August 2003 1	Athletic Bilbao	0–1	Barcelona	Bilbao
			Cocu 11'	Stadium: San Mames

3 September 2003 2	Barcelona	1–1	Sevilla	Barcelona
	Ronaldinho 58'			Stadium: Camp Nou

14 September 2003 3	Albacete	1–2	Barcelona	Albacete
			Cocu 2'; Luis Enrique 67'	Stadium: Estadio Carlos Belmonte

20 September 2003 4	Barcelona	1–1	Osasuna	Barcelona
	Izquierdo 69' (o.g.)			Stadium: Camp Nou

28 September 2003 5	Atlético Madrid	0–0	Barcelona	Madrid
				Stadium: Estadio Vicente Calderon

5 October 2003 6	Barcelona	0–1	Valencia	Barcelona
				Stadium: Camp Nou

18 October 2003 7	Barcelona	0–2	Deportivo La Coruña	Barcelona
				Stadium: Camp Nou

26 October 2003 8	Mallorca	1–3	Barcelona	Palma de Mallorca
			Saviola 10'; Ronaldinho 22'; Cocu 50'	Stadium: Son Moix

29 October 2003 9	Barcelona	3–0	Real Murcia	Barcelona
	Saviola 38'; Xavi 56'; Ronaldinho 65'			Stadium: Camp Nou

2 November 2003 10	Real Sociedad	3–3	Barcelona	San Sebastián
			Motta 35'; Overmars 71'; Gabri 80'	Stadium: Reale Arena

9 November 2003 11	Barcelona	2–1	Real Betis	Barcelona
	Kluivert 42'; Márquez 82'			Stadium: Camp Nou

22 November 2003 12	Villarreal	2–1	Barcelona	Villarreal
			Kluivert 71'	Stadium: Estadio de la Cerámica

30 November 2003 13	Barcelona	0–0	Valladolid	Barcelona
				Stadium: Camp Nou

3 December 2003 14	Málaga	5–1	Barcelona	Málaga
			Sanz 78' (own goal)	Stadium: La Rosaleda

6 December 2003 15	Barcelona	1–2	Real Madrid	Barcelona
	Kluivert 83'			Stadium: Camp Nou

13 December 2003 16	Espanyol	1–3	Barcelona	Cornellá de Llobregat
			Ronaldinho 10'; Kluivert 80'; Kluivert 86'	Stadium: RCDE Stadium

21 December 2003 17	Barcelona	1–1	Celta Vigo	Barcelona
	Phillip Cocu 69'			Stadium: Camp Nou

4 January 2004 18	Racing Santander	3–0	Barcelona	Santander
				Stadium: Campos de Sport de El Sardinero

11 January 2004 19	Barcelona	3–0	Zaragoza	Barcelona
	Saviola 24'; Ronaldinho 45'; Xavi 65'			Stadium: Camp Nou

17 January 2004 20	Barcelona	1–1	Athletic Bilbao	Barcelona
	Kluivert 62'			Stadium: Camp Nou

25 January 2004 21	Sevilla	0–1	Barcelona	Sevilla
			Kluivert 30'	Stadium: Ramón Sánchez Pizjuán Stadium

1 February 2004 22	Barcelona	5–0	Albacete	Barcelona
	Xavi 15'; Saviola 49'; Quaresma 52'; Davids 53'; Luis Enrique 90'			Stadium: Camp Nou

8 February 2004 23	Osasuna	1–2	Barcelona	Pamplona
19:00 CET			Saviola 42'; Ronaldinho 76'	Stadium: El Sadar Stadium

15 February 2004 24	Barcelona	3–1	Atlético Madrid	Barcelona
19:00 CET	Saviola 9'; Ronaldinho 24'; L. García 43'			Stadium: Camp Nou

21 February 2004 25	Valencia	0–1	Barcelona	Valencia
			Gerard 77'	Stadium: Mestalla

29 February 2004 26	Deportivo La Coruña	2–3	Barcelona	A Coruña
			Ronaldinho 26'; Ronaldinho 48'; Saviola 29'	Stadium: Estadio Riazor

7 March 2004 27	Barcelona	3–2	Mallorca	Barcelona
	L. García 2'; L. García 57'; Luis Enrique 15'			Stadium: Camp Nou

14 March 2004 28	Real Murcia	0–2	Barcelona	Murcia
			Saviola 4'; Ronaldinho 61'	Stadium: Estadio Nueva Condomina

21 March 2004 29	Barcelona	1–0	Real Sociedad	Barcelona
	Ronaldinho 88'			Stadium: Camp Nou

3 April 2004 30	Barcelona	0–0	Villarreal	Barcelona
				Stadium: Camp Nou

10 April 2004 31	Valladolid	1–3	Barcelona	Valladolid
18:00 CEST			Saviola 2'; Ronaldinho 30'; Iniesta 84'	Stadium: Estadio José Zorrilla

14 April 2004 32	Real Betis	1–1	Barcelona	Sevilla
			Saviola 4'	Stadium: Estadio Benito Villamarín

18 April 2004 33	Barcelona	3–0	Málaga	Barcelona
	Saviola 18'; L. García 23'; Cocu 34'			Stadium: Camp Nou

25 April 2004 34	Real Madrid	1–2	Barcelona	Madrid
			Kluivert 56'; Xavi 86'	Stadium: Santiago Bernabeu

2 May 2004 35	Barcelona	4–1	Espanyol	Barcelona
	Ronaldinho 34'; Saviola 43'; Saviola 57'; Van Bronckhorst 54'			Stadium: Camp Nou

8 May 2004 36	Celta Vigo	1–0	Barcelona	Vigo
				Stadium: Balaídos

16 May 2004 37	Barcelona	1–0	Racing Santander	Barcelona
	Ronaldinho 15'			Stadium: Camp Nou

23 May 2004 38	Zaragoza	2–1	Barcelona	Zaragoza
			9' Saviola	Stadium: La Romareda

=== Copa del Rey ===
7 October 2003 Round of 64	Gramenet	0–1	Barcelona	Sant Adrià de Besòs
			Ronaldinho 83'	Stadium: Municipal de Sant Adrià; Attendance: 3,500; Referee: Evaristo Puentes Leira

17 December 2003 Round of 32	Ciudad de Murcia	0–4	Barcelona	Murcia
			Saviola 24'; Overmars 75', 86'; Ronaldinho 90' (pen.)	Stadium: Estadio de La Condomina; Attendance: 10,500; Referee: Luis Medina Cantalejo

8 January 2004 Round of 16, First Leg	Levante	1–0	Barcelona	Valencia
	Rivera 10' (pen.)			Stadium: Ciutat de València; Attendance: 28,196; Referee: Julián Rodríguez Santiago

14 January 2004 Round of 16, Second Leg	Barcelona	3–1 (3–2 agg.)	Levante	Barcelona
	Iniesta 3'; Saviola 45'; Ronaldinho 66' (pen.)		Congo 80'	Stadium: Camp Nou; Attendance: 41,427; Referee: José Losantos Omar

22 January 2004 Quarter-finals, First Leg	Barcelona	0–1	Zaragoza	Barcelona
		Report	Villa 74' (pen.)	Stadium: Camp Nou; Attendance: 46,506; Referee: Carlos Megía Dávila

29 January 2004 Quarter-finals, Second Leg	Zaragoza	1–1 (2–1 agg.)	Barcelona	Zaragoza
	Yordi 85'	Report	L. García 12'	Stadium: La Romareda; Attendance: 28,000; Referee: Alberto Undiano Mallenco

=== UEFA Cup ===
24 September 2003 First Round, First Leg	Matador Púchov (Slovakia)	1–1	(Spain) Barcelona	Trnava, Slovakia
	Jambor 90+3'	Report	Kluivert 49'	Stadium: Štadión Antona Malatinského; Attendance: 18,500; Referee: Kuddusi Müftüoğlu (Turkey)

15 October 2003 First Round, Second Leg	Barcelona (Spain)	8–0 (9–1 agg.)	(Slovakia) Matador Púchov	Barcelona, Spain
	Ronaldinho 7', 20', 57'; Motta 41'; Luis Enrique 64', 75'; Saviola 73', 89'	Report		Stadium: Camp Nou; Attendance: 29,000; Referee: Nicolai Vollquartz (Denmark)

6 November 2003 Second Round, First leg	Panionios (Greece)	0–3	(Spain) Barcelona	Athens, Greece
		Report	Luis García 43'; Kluivert 47'; Xavi 90+2'	Stadium: Nea Smyrni Stadium; Attendance: 10,000; Referee: Jacek Granat (Poland)

27 November 2003 Second Round, Second Leg	Barcelona (Spain)	2–0 (5–0 agg.)	(Greece) Panionios	Barcelona, Spain
	Saviola 33'; Luis García 44'	Report		Stadium: Camp Nou; Attendance: 25,324; Referee: Claude Colombo (France)

26 February 2004 Third Round, First Leg	Brøndby (Denmark)	0–1	(Spain) Barcelona	Copenhagen, Denmark
20:30		Report	Ronaldinho 63'	Stadium: Brøndby Stadium, Attendance: 26,031; Referee: Frank De Bleeckere (Belgium)

3 March 2004 Third Round, Second Leg	Barcelona (Spain)	2–1 (3–1 agg.)	(Denmark) Brøndby	Barcelona, Spain
	Luis García 31'; Cocu 43'	Report	Nielsen 84'	Stadium: Camp Nou; Attendance: 50,000; Referee: Massimo Busacca (Switzerland)

11 March 2004 Fourth Round, First Leg	Celtic (Scotland)	1–0	(Spain) Barcelona	Glasgow, Scotland
20:30	Thompson 59'	Report		Stadium: Celtic Park, Attendance: 59,539; Referee: Wolfgang Stark (Germany)

25 March 2004 Fourth Round, Second Leg	Barcelona (Spain)	0–0 (0–1 agg.)	(Scotland) Celtic	Barcelona, Spain
		Report		Stadium: Camp Nou; Attendance: 77,108; Referee: Domenico Messina (Italy)

== Statistics ==
=== Players statistics ===
No.	Pos	Nat	Player	Total		La Liga		Copa del Rey		UEFA Cup	
No.	Pos	Nat	Player	Apps	Goals	Apps	Goals	Apps	Goals	Apps	Goals
25	GK	(Spain) ESP	Valdes	44	-38	33	-31	6	-4	5	-3
2	DF	(Netherlands) NED	Reiziger	40	0	29+1	0	4	0	6	0
5	DF	(Spain) ESP	Puyol	38	0	27	0	4	0	7	0
4	DF	(Mexico) MEX	Marquez	31	1	17+5	1	5+1	0	2+1	0
12	DF	(Netherlands) NED	van Bronckhorst	44	1	34	1	5	0	5	0
8	MF	(Netherlands) NED	Cocu	48	6	36	5	5	0	7	1
6	MF	(Spain) ESP	Xavi	49	5	34+2	4	5+1	0	7	1
3	MF	(Netherlands) NED	Davids	20	1	18	1	2	0	0	0
22	FW	(Spain) ESP	Luis García	38	8	23+2	4	5+1	1	7	3
7	FW	(Argentina) ARG	Saviola	46	19	28+5	14	5+1	2	6+1	3
10	FW	(Brazil) BRA	Ronaldinho	45	21	32	14	5+1	3	7	4
1	GK	(Turkey) TUR	Recber	7	-6	3+1	-6	0	0	3	0
32	DF	(Spain) ESP	Oleguer	24	0	17+1	0	2	0	4	0
23	MF	(Brazil) BRA	Motta	26	2	13+7	1	1	0	5	1
18	MF	(Spain) ESP	Gabri	22	1	12+4	1	1	0	4+1	0
9	FW	(Netherlands) NED	Kluivert	26	10	11+10	8	2	0	1+2	2
14	MF	(Spain) ESP	Gerard	28	1	11+8	1	2+2	0	2+3	0
20	MF	(Portugal) POR	Quaresma	28	1	10+12	1	1+1	0	3+1	0
21	MF	(Spain) ESP	Luis Enrique	30	5	10+14	3	0+1	0	4+1	2
11	MF	(Netherlands) NED	Overmars	31	3	5+15	1	1+2	2	1+7	0
24	MF	(Spain) ESP	Iniesta	17	2	5+6	1	3	1	0+3	0
27	DF	(Spain) ESP	Óscar López	11	0	2+4	0	1+2	0	1+1	0
28	GK	(Spain) ESP	Jorquera	2	-2	2	-2	0	0	0	0
36	FW	(Spain) ESP	Sergio García	7	0	2+2	0	2	0	0+1	0
16	DF	(Spain) ESP	Mario	2	0	1	0	0	0	1	0
26	MF	(Spain) ESP	Ros	2	0	0+1	0	0+1	0	0	0
37	MF	(Spain) ESP	Santamaria	4	0	1+3	0	0	0	0	0
3†	DF	(Sweden) SWE	Andersson	5	0	2+2	0	1	0	0	0

== Results ==
Date	Competition	Opponent	H / A	Result
27 July 2003	Friendly	Juventus	N	2–2 (5–6p)
30 July 2003	Friendly	Milan	N	0–2
3 August 2003	Friendly	Manchester United	N	3–1
8 August 2003	Friendly	Leicester City	A	0–1
10 August 2003	Friendly	Manchester City	A	2–1
12 August 2003	Friendly	Derry City	A	0–5
16 August 2003	Festa d'Elx Trophy	Elx	A	0–0 (1–3p)
22 August 2003	Joan Gamper Trophy	Boca Juniors	H	1–1 (5–3p)
24 August 2003	Copa Catalunya (semi-final)	Girona	A	0–4
26 August 2003	Copa Catalunya (final)	Espanyol	N	0–1
1 October 2003	87th Anniversary of Club Amèrica	Club América	A	2–0
16 November 2003	Friendly	Porto	A	2–0
9 December 2003	Friendly	Sabadell	A	1–3
11 February 2004	Friendly	Figueres	A	1–1
18 February 2004	Friendly	Shakhtar Donetsk	H	3–2
21 April 2004	Friendly	China	H	6–0
