= Andrés Iniesta =

Spanish footballer (born 1984)

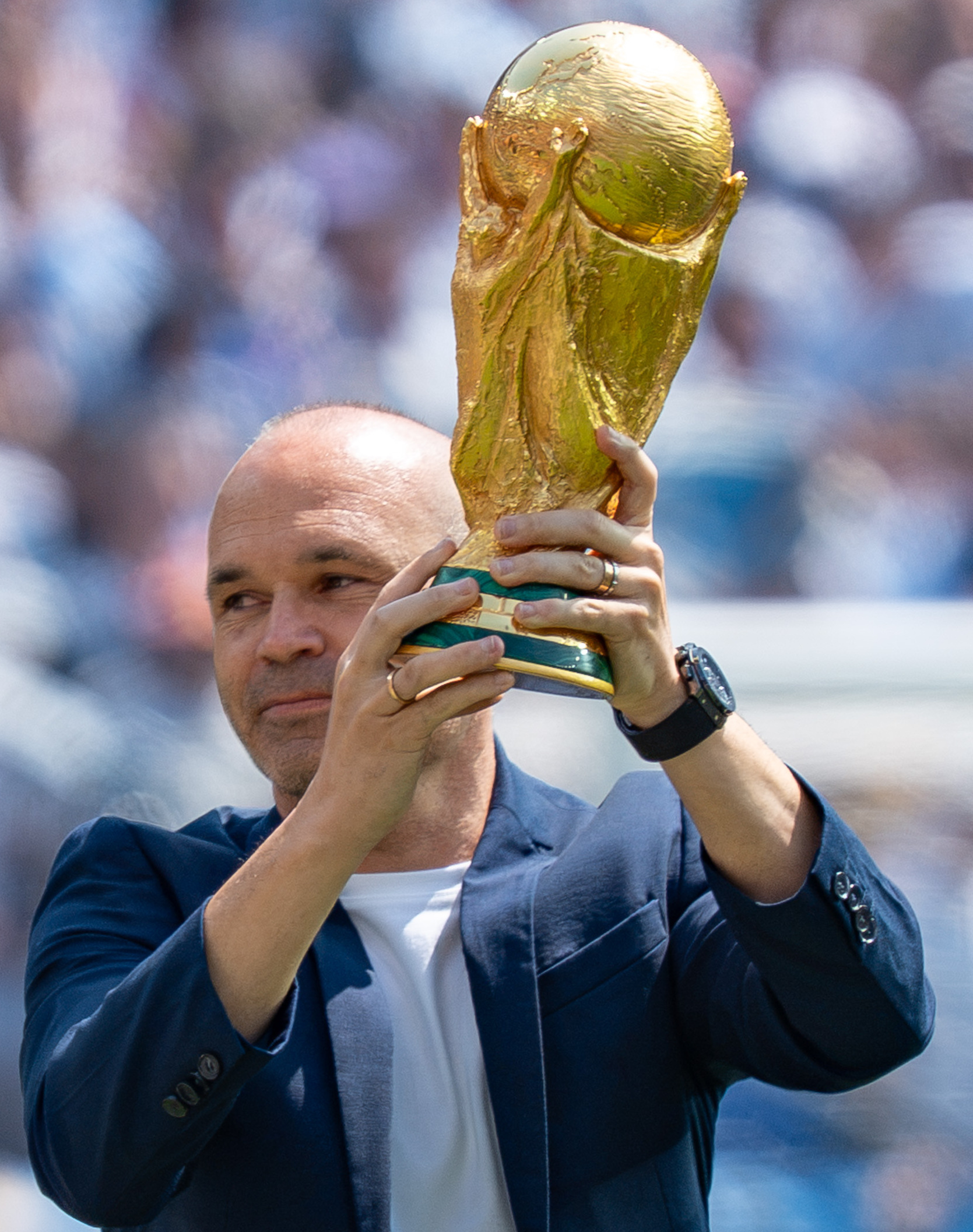
- Iniesta in 2026

Personal information
- Full name: Andrés Iniesta Luján
- Date of birth: 11 May 1984 (age 42)
- Place of birth: Fuentealbilla, Spain
- Height: 1.71 m (5 ft 7 in)
- Position: Midfielder

Team information
- Current team: Gulf United (manager)

Youth career
- 1994–1996: Albacete
- 1996–2001: Barcelona

Senior career*
Years	Team	Apps	(Gls)
2000–2003	Barcelona B	49	(5)
2002–2018	Barcelona	442	(35)
2018–2023	Vissel Kobe	114	(21)
2023–2024	Emirates	20	(5)
Total		625	(66)

International career
2000	Spain U15	2	(0)
2000–2001	Spain U16	7	(1)
2001	Spain U17	4	(0)
2001–2002	Spain U19	7	(1)
2003	Spain U20	7	(3)
2003–2006	Spain U21	18	(6)
2004	Catalonia	1	(0)
2006–2018	Spain	131	(13)

Managerial career
- 2026–: Gulf United
Medal record
Men's football
Representing Spain
FIFA World Cup
Winner	2010 South Africa	Team
UEFA European Championship
Winner	2008 Austria–Switzerland	Team
Winner	2012 Poland–Ukraine	Team
UEFA U-19 Championship
Winner	2002 Norway
UEFA U-17 Championship
Winner	2001 England
FIFA Confederations Cup
Runner-up	2013 Brazil
FIFA U-20 World Cup
Runner-up	2003 United Arab Emirates
- * Club domestic league appearances and goals

Andrés Iniesta Luján (Spanish pronunciation: [anˈdɾes iˈnjesta luˈxan]; born 11 May 1984) is a Spanish professional football manager and former player who is currently the manager of UAE First Division League club Gulf United. Widely regarded as one of the greatest midfielders of all time, he was lauded for his balance, ball control and agility in close spaces, combined with his skill, composure, and flair on the ball. In addition, he is also one of a select number of players who have amassed over 1,000 career appearances.

Iniesta joined Barcelona's La Masia academy after moving from his birthplace at a young age and quickly emerged as one of the club's prospects. He made his first-team debut aged 18 in 2002 and became a regular during Barcelona's 2004–05 La Liga-winning campaign. The following season, he played a key role as the club achieved a league and UEFA Champions League double. His reputation continued to grow, culminating in a vital role in Barcelona's historic treble-winning campaign in 2008–09. Iniesta was named in the FIFA FIFPro World XI and the UEFA Team of the Year in 2009, the first of nine and six selections, respectively. In 2010–11, Iniesta won his third Champions League title as Barcelona completed another domestic double. He won the UEFA Best Player in Europe award in 2012 and was named the IFFHS World's Best Playmaker in 2012 and 2013. In 2014–15, he was part of another treble success.

In total, Iniesta won 33 trophies with Barça, which include nine La Liga titles and four Champions League titles, making him the most decorated Spanish footballer of all time. With the initial management guidance by Pep Guardiola and using the tiki-taka football philosophy, Iniesta was part of a widely lauded midfield combination trio with Xavi and Sergio Busquets; from 2008 to 2015, the trio together were instrumental in Barcelona's on-field successes in seven seasons. After 22 years at Barcelona, Iniesta signed for J1 League club Vissel Kobe in 2018. After leaving the club in 2023, he signed for UAE Pro League club Emirates, eventually retiring in October 2024.

Iniesta played for Spain at the Under-16, Under-19 and Under-21 levels before making his senior debut in 2006. He helped Spain win UEFA Euro 2008, playing every game and being selected in the Team of the Tournament. Iniesta was also a key member of the victorious Spanish team at the 2010 FIFA World Cup; he scored the winning goal in the final against the Netherlands, for which he was named the Man of the Match, and was selected to the tournament's All-Star Team. His performances in 2010 for both club and country saw him being runner-up to Lionel Messi for the 2010 FIFA Ballon d'Or. At UEFA Euro 2012, Iniesta led Spain to their second consecutive continental crown, again being chosen as the Man of the Match of the final against Italy, and was named the Player of the Tournament. He achieved third place in the 2012 Ballon d'Or. In 2016, he was named in the All-time UEFA Euro XI. In total, he won 131 caps in twelve years as an international.

== Club career ==
=== Barcelona ===
==== Early career ====
Iniesta comes from Fuentealbilla, a small village in the province of Albacete, Castile–La Mancha, where he mostly played futsal due to the lack of football pitches in the village. At the age of 12, while playing for Albacete in a junior seven-a-side tournament, he attracted the attention of scouts from clubs around Spain. His parents knew Barcelona's youth team coach, Enrique Orizaola, and he persuaded them to consider sending Iniesta to the Barcelona youth academy. Iniesta traveled there with his parents and visited La Masia, the farmhouse where the club houses its young players; the trip convinced them to enroll Iniesta in the Barcelona youth ranks.

"Receive, pass, offer, receive, pass, offer."

— Iniesta on La Masia education of ball retention, passing and using space

Iniesta says he "cried rivers" the day he left for La Masia and struggled being separated from his parents; he was very shy and kept to himself while there. He captained the Barcelona Under-15 team to victory in the Nike Premier Cup of 1999, scoring the winning goal in the last minute of the final, and was named player of the tournament. Just after Iniesta arrived at the club, then-captain Pep Guardiola famously told fellow midfielder Xavi: "You're going to retire me. This lad [Iniesta] is going to retire us all."

==== 2004–2008 ====
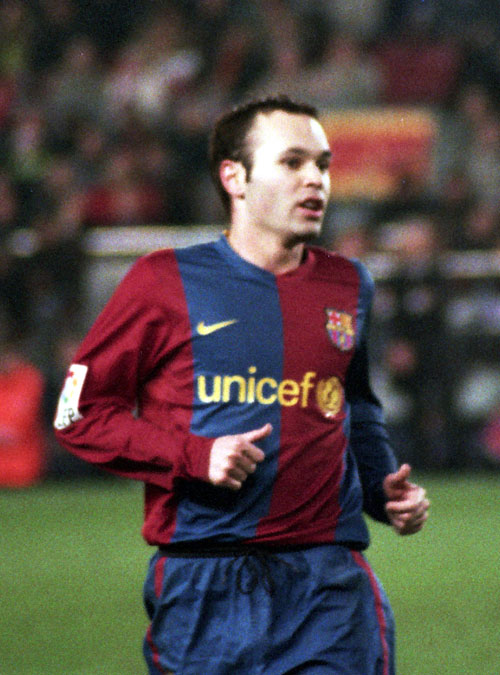
Iniesta with Barcelona in 2006

Iniesta joined the first team during the tenure of Radomir Antić. On 29 October 2002, he made his first team debut in a 1–0 away win against Club Brugge in the UEFA Champions League group stage. In the 2004–05 season, he featured in 37 out of 38 league games—more than any other player—although 25 of these were substitute appearances. He scored twice as Barcelona won La Liga. An injury to Xavi at the start of the 2005–06 season allowed Iniesta more regular starts in the centre of midfield, and he continued to improve and develop. He played in 11 UEFA Champions League games, including a half-time appearance in the 2006 final, to replace Edmílson. His contribution to the team was praised by manager Frank Rijkaard as Barcelona won a league and Champions League double.

The 2006–07 season saw Iniesta's profile continue to rise and he earned plaudits for his willingness to play in any position for his team. In the pre-season, he lifted the Joan Gamper Trophy as the captain of the team after a 4–0 victory over German side Bayern Munich. Iniesta played for the first time as a left wing-forward for Barça in two Champions League matches against Levski Sofia, finding the net twice. In the first knockout stage of the same competition, he played in central midfield against Liverpool. Despite being moved around the pitch by manager Rijkaard, the 2006–07 season remains Iniesta's highest scoring season.

With the departure of Ludovic Giuly ahead of the 2007–08 season, Iniesta was able to switch his number 24 shirt for his preferred number 8. Despite rumours of a possible transfer before the season, On 25 January 2008, he extended his contract until 2014, with his buy-out clause being raised to €150 million. Don Balón, a member of European Sports Magazines, named Iniesta one of the most consistent performers in the previous two seasons of La Liga; he placed fifth in 2006–07 and fourth in 2007–08. He also placed ninth in the 2008 FIFA World Player of the Year voting, gaining 37 total points.

==== 2008–09 ====
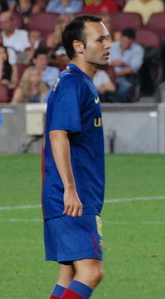
Iniesta during the 2008 Joan Gamper Trophy

At the start of the 2008–09 season, in September 2008, Iniesta was elected the fourth-choice captain behind, in order of preference, Carles Puyol, Xavi and Víctor Valdés; all four were products of the Barcelona youth system. His performances throughout the season were highly lauded, and he received standing ovations both in Barcelona at the Camp Nou, as well as from rival supporters in away matches. A leg injury sustained in mid-November 2008 left Iniesta sidelined until 3 January 2009; initially expected to return to action in six weeks, he did not want to come back until he was 100 percent. Upon his return to action on 3 January 2009, as a 65th-minute substitute against Mallorca, he scored a crucial goal after just ten minutes on the pitch and completed a Barcelona comeback in front of the Camp Nou. 3 days later, he captained Barcelona for the first time in an official match, a 3–1 victory against Atlético Madrid at the Vicente Calderón in the Round of 16 first-leg of the Copa del Rey.

Iniesta sustained another injury during a home match against Málaga, but returned to action for the first-leg Champions League quarter-final against Bayern Munich on 8 April 2009, which Barcelona won 4–0. He scored a vital equaliser in the final minute of stoppage time during the second leg of the Champions League semi-final against Chelsea, with a curling strike with the outside of his right foot 25 yards from goal, securing the tie on away goals as the match finished 1–1 at Stamford Bridge. In the season review, Un Any Al Paradis, Iniesta wrote: "I connected with that shot with the outside, not the inside or the tip of my boot, but right from my heart, with all my might."

"I knew I would play injured and do more damage. For 17 days, all I thought about was the final in Rome and winning, even knowing that I would do more damage. I'd repeat it, for sure. I love this club and my profession and I wanted to win. If we had lost the final, that would have been a total disaster."

— Iniesta on the victorious 2009 UEFA Champions League final

Iniesta's goal against Chelsea sent Barcelona through to the final in Rome against defending champions Manchester United. Prior to the final, United manager Alex Ferguson identified Iniesta as Barça's biggest threat: "He's fantastic. He makes the team work. The way he finds passes, his movement and ability to create space is incredible. He's so important for Barcelona." Despite a thigh injury, Iniesta played and was influential in the game, providing the assist for the first goal scored by Samuel Eto'o as his team went on to win 2–0. In his analysis, David Pleat wrote: "In the end the midfield artistry of Iniesta and Xavi, helped by [Lionel] Messi, was the critical factor." After the game, United striker Wayne Rooney described Iniesta as the best player in the world.

Iniesta received plaudits for his performances that season; Don Balón rated him as the league's most consistent performer. Later that year, he placed fifth for the 2009 FIFA World Player of the Year award, with 134 votes, and fourth for the Ballon d'Or, receiving 149 points. Barcelona extended his contract by one year, until 2015, and raised his buy-out clause to €200 million.

==== 2009–2012 ====
Barcelona won a second successive league title in the 2009–10 season, securing a record 99 points. Individually, however, Iniesta endured a campaign largely disrupted by recurring injuries. He missed pre-season fitness training due to the thigh tear suffered in the 2009 UEFA Champions League final. Despite featuring in almost as many matches as the previous season, he did so mostly as a substitute, starting only 20 games throughout. His season came to a premature end in April after he aggravated a previous calf injury during training.

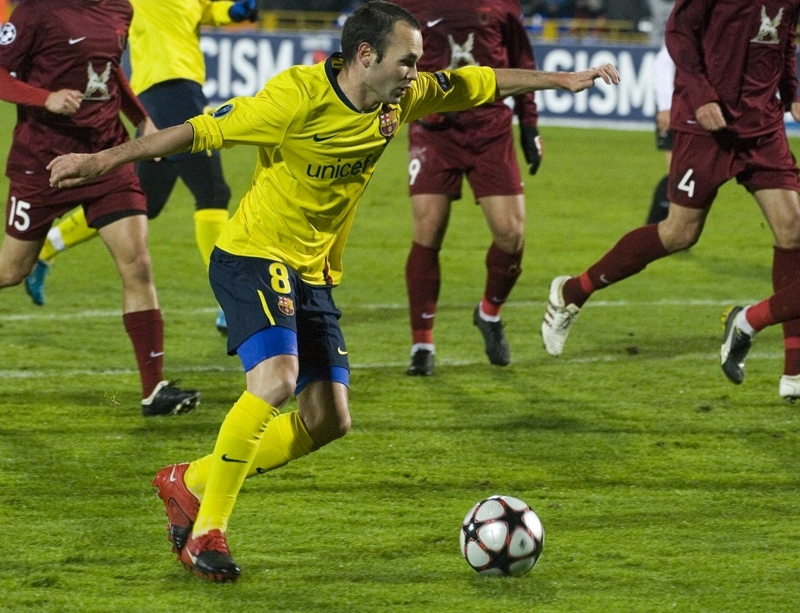
Iniesta playing against Rubin Kazan in the UEFA Champions League in October 2009

A contributing factor of Iniesta's fractured season were the episodes of psychological instability he suffered privately following the death of his close friend Daniel Jarque, a fellow footballer, on 8 August 2009. Even when physically fit, he was often unable to complete training sessions or exert himself. After seeking psychological help, including from psychologist Inma Puig, he experienced catharsis when he scored Spain's match-winning goal in the 2010 FIFA World Cup final, which he dedicated to Jarque by revealing the message "Dani Jarque, always with us" written on his undershirt. "I did it because I felt it deeply," Iniesta said at the time. "It showed that what is more important than rivalry, your team or your colours is to be human and a good person. I am delighted because it was the most important moment in my career." Regarding the recurrent injuries that plagued his season, he said: "It was hard, but I will start with more desire than ever."

Iniesta scored his first goal of the 2010–11 season during the opening league fixture against Racing Santander, lobbing the ball into the net from a distance of 30 yards. Throughout the campaign, he received standing ovations from opposition fans, including at the El Sardinero and the Vicente Calderón, in appreciation of his World Cup-winning goal. Another standing ovation came on the home pitch of Espanyol in the Derbi barceloní, with the crowd acknowledging his friendship with Daniel Jarque, Espanyol's captain at the time of his death. Iniesta was one of the three finalists for the 2010 FIFA Ballon d'Or alongside Xavi and Messi, placing as runner-up behind the Argentine.

Iniesta started the 2011–12 season by scoring the opening goal in the second leg of the Supercopa de España against rivals Real Madrid. Barcelona went on to win the match 3–2 and the cup 5–4 on aggregate. One of his best goals followed in October against Viktoria Plzeň in the Champions League group stage after an interchange of passes with Messi. Iniesta played a record 51 matches unbeaten in La Liga, concluding with Barcelona's 2–0 defeat of Mallorca on 24 March. In the Champions League, he ended a goal drought by scoring a vital goal against Milan in the quarter-finals. From there, he went on to score in the semi-final against Chelsea to make the scoreline 2–0, but the match ended 2–2, eliminating his team 3–2 on aggregate. Towards the end of the year, on 25 November, Iniesta was named man of the match after scoring one goal and providing three assists in a 4–0 win over Levante. His performances earned him third place in the voting of the 2012 FIFA Ballon d'Or.

==== 2013–2018 ====
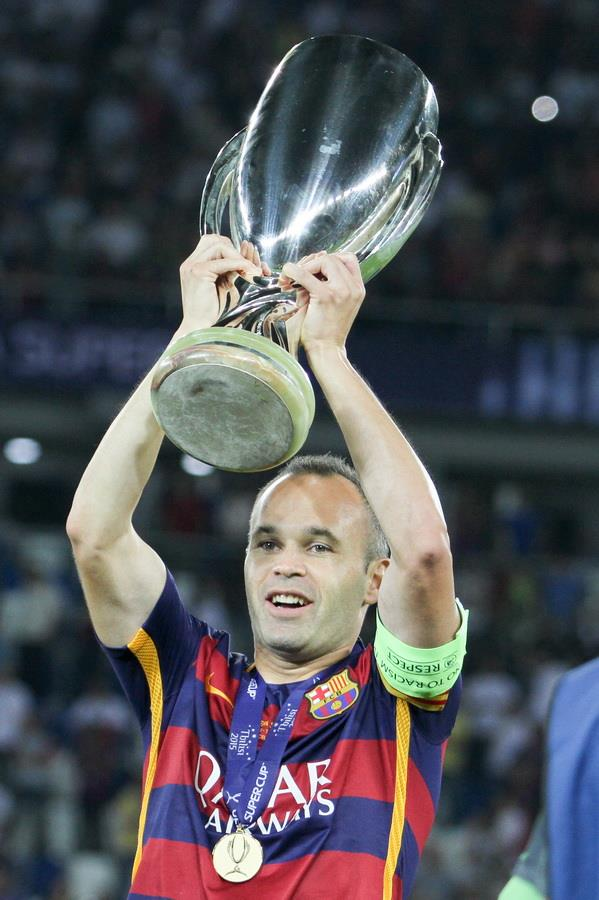
Iniesta lifting the 2015 UEFA Super Cup trophy

Iniesta signed a new contract with Barcelona in December 2013, keeping him at the club until 2018. As vice-captain, he regularly captained Barça throughout the club's second treble-winning campaign of the 2014–15 season, and became captain after Carles Puyol's retirement and Xavi's departure. Iniesta scored three times during the team's Copa del Rey campaign, and was man of the match in the 2015 UEFA Champions League final, having assisted Ivan Rakitić's opening goal in the 3–1 win against Italian champions Juventus at the Olympiastadion in Berlin. Their European victory made Barcelona the first club in history to win the treble of domestic league, domestic cup and European Cup twice; Iniesta was among the seven players to have been a part of both treble-winning teams.

During the first Clásico of the 2015–16 season, on 21 November, Iniesta became only the third Barcelona player, after Diego Maradona in 1983 and Ronaldinho in 2005, to receive applause from Real Madrid fans at the Santiago Bernabéu. His man-of-the-match performance included a goal and an assist, contributing to a resounding 4–0 victory.

He signed a lifetime contract with Barcelona on 6 October 2017, effectively keeping him with the club for the remainder of his career. He played the 650th game of his career for Barcelona against Levante on 7 January 2018, he was replaced by André Gomes after 76 minutes as the game ended 3–0 in favour of Barcelona.

Despite signing a lifetime contract, on 27 April 2018, Iniesta announced he would be leaving Barcelona by the end of the season. He made his 674th and final appearance for Barcelona on 20 May, in the final league match of the season, a 1–0 home victory over Real Sociedad, as Barcelona celebrated the victory of their 25th league and 30th Copa del Rey title; he came off in the 81st minute for Paco Alcácer.

=== Vissel Kobe ===
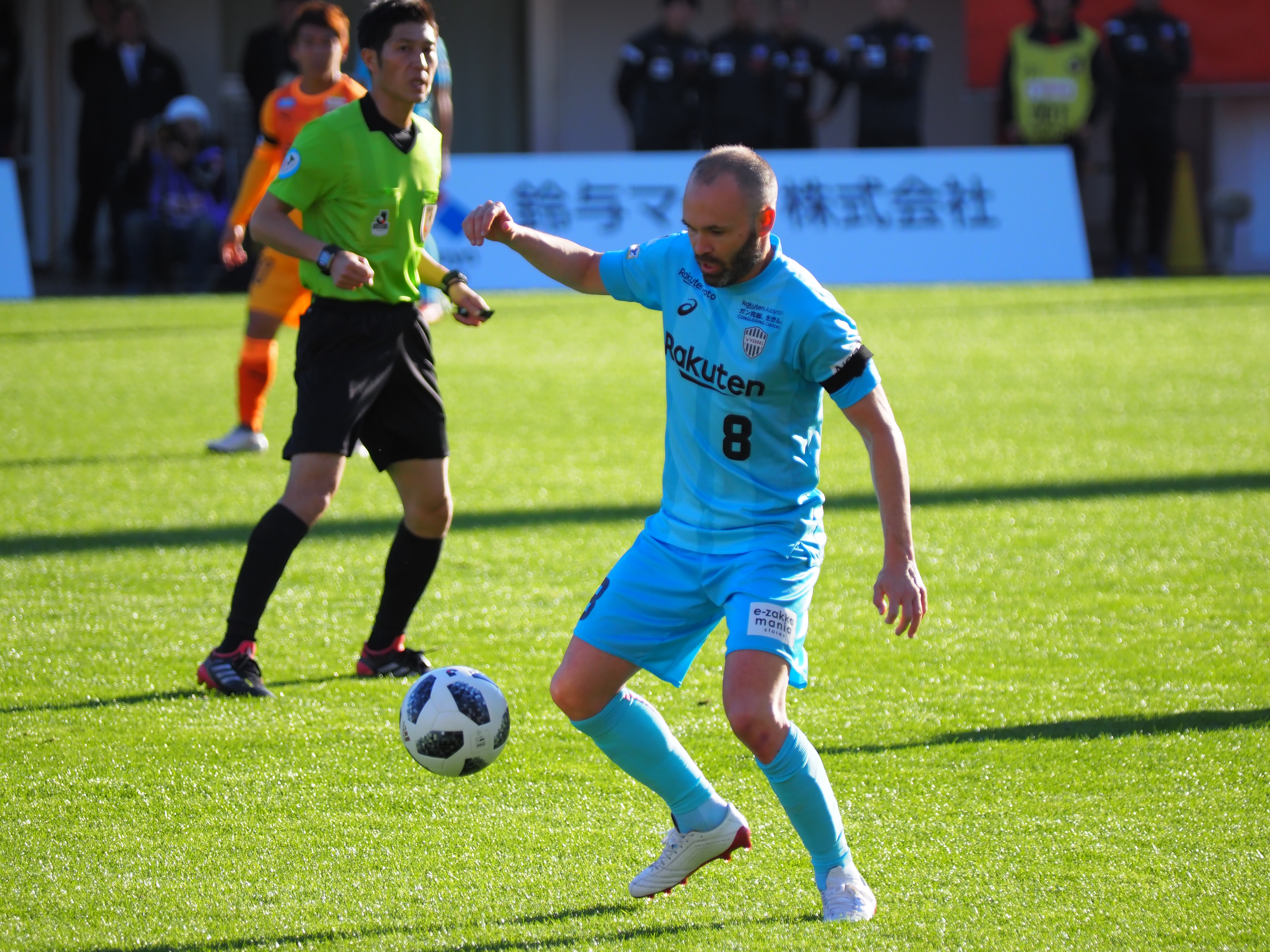
Iniesta with Vissel Kobe in 2018

On 24 May 2018, Japanese club Vissel Kobe announced the signing of Iniesta on a three-year deal. He made his debut on 22 July, coming on as a second-half substitute for Kazuma Watanabe in a 0–3 defeat against Shonan Bellmare. On 11 August 2018, Iniesta scored his first goal in the J1 League in a 2–1 win over Jubilo Iwata.

On 21 December 2019, he scored the opening goal in a 3–1 win over Shimizu S-Pulse in the semi-final of the 2019 Emperor's Cup. On 1 January 2020, he won his first trophy in Japan, starting in Vissel Kobe's 2–0 victory over Kashima Antlers in the final of the 2019 Emperor's Cup. A month later, he also won the 2020 Japanese Super Cup. On 7 December 2020, Iniesta suffered a tear of the rectus femoris muscle during a 2–0 win in the round of 16 of the 2020 AFC Champions League against Shanghai SIPG, in which he also scored the first goal of the game. He had a successful surgery in Barcelona a few days later.

On 11 May 2021, Iniesta signed a contract extension with Vissel Kobe, keeping him at the club for another two seasons. On 11 November 2021, he was named J.League Monthly MVP after scoring three league goals in October. He was named in the 2021 J.League Best XI on 6 December 2021.

On 14 May 2022, Iniesta scored a goal and guided Vissel Kobe to its first league win of the 2022 season in a 4–0 victory over Sagan Tosu.

On 25 May 2023, Vissel Kobe said Iniesta would leave the club midway through the current J.League season, on 1 July. Iniesta had played significantly less for the club in his final season. He stated he did not want to retire as yet, and wished to play for a club where he could get regular playing time.

=== Emirates and retirement ===
On 7 August 2023, Iniesta arrived in the United Arab Emirates to join the UAE Pro League club Emirates. He signed a one-year contract with an option to extend until 2025. He made his debut on 19 August 2023 against Al Wasl, coming off the bench in the second half, in a match ended with a 0–1 defeat as the Emirates failed to create a single shot on target. On 25 August 2023, he would score his first UAE Pro League goal, a penalty in injury time against Ajman in a match that ended as a 4–4 draw. His first season with Emirates concluded in the 13th place and relegation to the Division 1.

On 7 October 2024, Iniesta announced his retirement from professional football.

== International career ==
=== 2001–2008 ===
Iniesta burst on to the international scene in 2001, helping Spain win the UEFA European Under-16 Championship. After representing his country at the 2001 FIFA U-17 World Championship held in Trinidad and Tobago, he was in the squad that claimed the UEFA European Under-19 Championship the following year. From then, he became a regular choice for youth coach Juan Santisteban. In 2003, he was part of the side that reached the FIFA World Youth Championship final in the United Arab Emirates, and was named in the FIFA all-star team. During his spell with the Spain U21 side, Iniesta was named captain on several occasions.

Iniesta was called up to represent the senior Spain squad at the 2006 FIFA World Cup on 15 May 2006, much to the surprise of many. He debuted at half-time in a friendly match against Russia on 27 May. His first goal followed in another friendly match against England on 7 February 2007. His long-range effort, hitting the underside of the crossbar on the way in, gave Spain the lead on 63 minutes. Iniesta played a pivotal part in Spain's qualification for UEFA Euro 2008 by scoring goals against Sweden and by assisting the strikers.

=== 2008–2012 ===
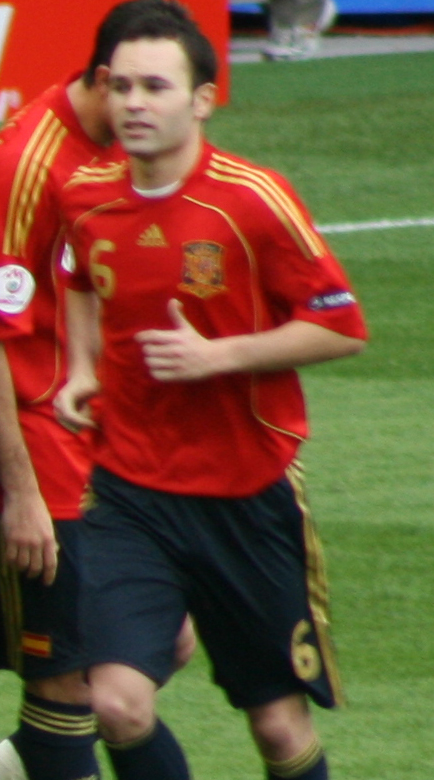
Iniesta with Spain at UEFA Euro 2008

Iniesta was selected in Spain's squad for UEFA Euro 2008 in Austria and Switzerland. Though a stomach ailment somewhat hampered his performances in the group stages, he still played an integral part in the midfield. He played in the first two of Spain's group stage matches and proved an important part of the team, providing a pass for David Villa's second goal against Russia. Despite Spain being assured qualification for the quarterfinals after two matches, he was not rested unlike most of Spain's regulars for the final group game against Greece, which Spain won 2–1 thanks to a volley from Rubén de la Red and a late winner from Daniel Güiza. Iniesta returned for the quarter-final as Spain beat Italy on penalties; he was substituted before the penalty shootout itself. In the semi-final against Russia, he played the entire 90 minutes and produced a cross that Xavi converted to open the scoring in an eventual 3–0 victory; he was subsequently named the Man of the Match. He played the duration of the final in Spain's 1–0 win over Germany. Iniesta was named in the Team of the Tournament alongside fellow Spain midfielders Xavi, Marcos Senna and six other teammates. Iniesta did not participate in the 2009 FIFA Confederations Cup in South Africa due to a thigh muscle injury; Spain was eliminated from the tournament at the semi-final stage.

Iniesta was selected for Spain in the 2010 World Cup and scored the second goal in a 2–1 group stage win against Chile. He was also named man of the match. For his excellent performances in helping Spain reach the final of the tournament, Iniesta was shortlisted for the Golden Ball award. During the final, he scored the winning goal in the 116th minute of a 1–0 win against Netherlands. He earned a yellow card for removing his jersey during his ecstatic goal celebration to reveal his message to his late friend Dani Jarque. He won the man of the match award for his performance in the final, which gave Spain its first-ever World Cup.

At UEFA Euro 2012, Iniesta was awarded the man of the match award for his performances in three different matches, and provided the assist for Jesús Navas's only goal of the match in the team's final group match against Croatia. He was also selected as man of the match in the final against Italy, which Spain won 4–0. In winning the award, Iniesta became the only Spanish player to win the award at least once in each of Spain's three consecutive successful tournaments. Iniesta was also chosen as the UEFA Euro 2012 Player of the Tournament.

=== 2013–2018 ===
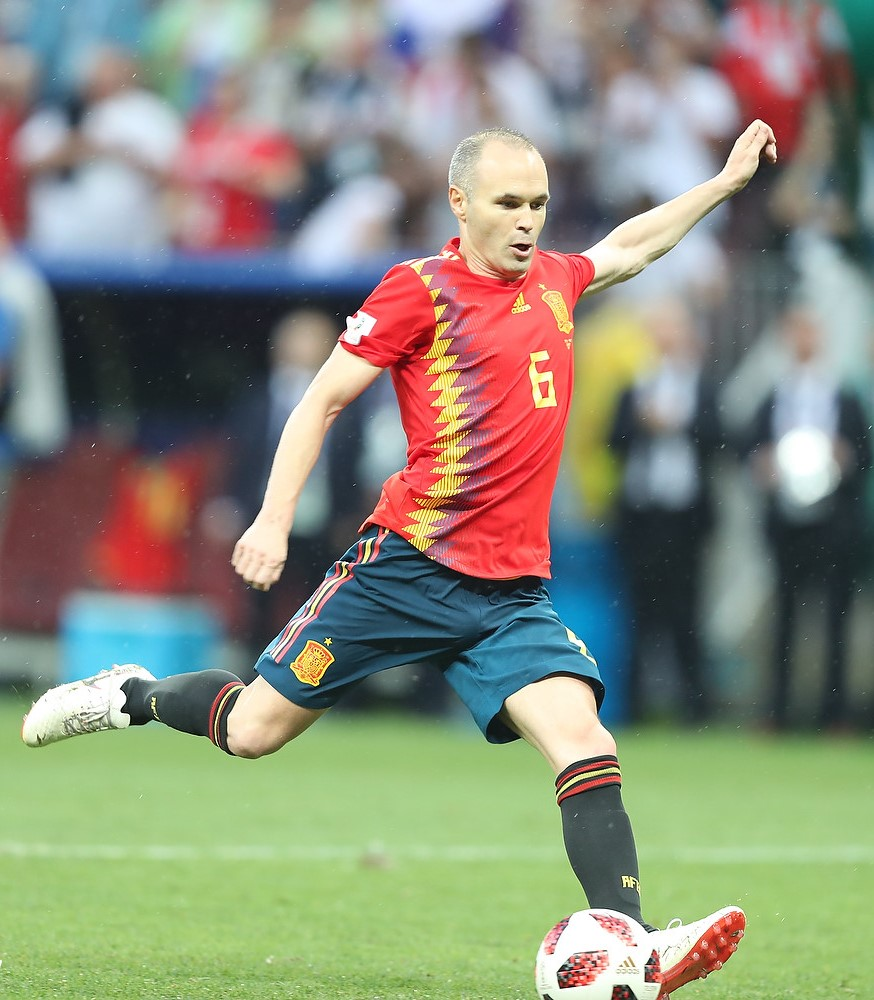
Iniesta with Spain at the 2018 FIFA World Cup in Russia

At the 2013 FIFA Confederations Cup, Iniesta was named in the Team of the Tournament and awarded the Silver Ball for the second best player in the competition, as Spain finished runner-up to host nation Brazil. Iniesta started all three matches for Spain at the 2014 World Cup, winning his 100th cap in the team's final group match against Australia. At the UEFA Euro 2016, he assisted the only goal of the match against Czech Republic and put in a man of the match display to give Spain a winning start in the tournament. He started in all four Spain's matches and were later knocked out by Italy in the Round of 16.

In May 2018, Iniesta was named in Spain's squad for the 2018 FIFA World Cup in Russia. He started in all three matches of the group stage, making an assist for Isco in the 2–2 draw against Morocco on 25 June 2018. He came off the bench in the 67th minute in Spain's last match at the tournament against Russia on 1 July 2018 for the round of 16. After the loss in the penalty shoot-outs, Iniesta announced his retirement from international duty. He amassed 131 senior international caps for Spain and at the time of retiring was the nation's fourth-most-capped player of all time, behind only Iker Casillas, Xavi, and Sergio Ramos.

== Managerial career ==
On 1 June 2026, Iniesta became the head coach of Emirati side Gulf United.

== Style of play and reception ==
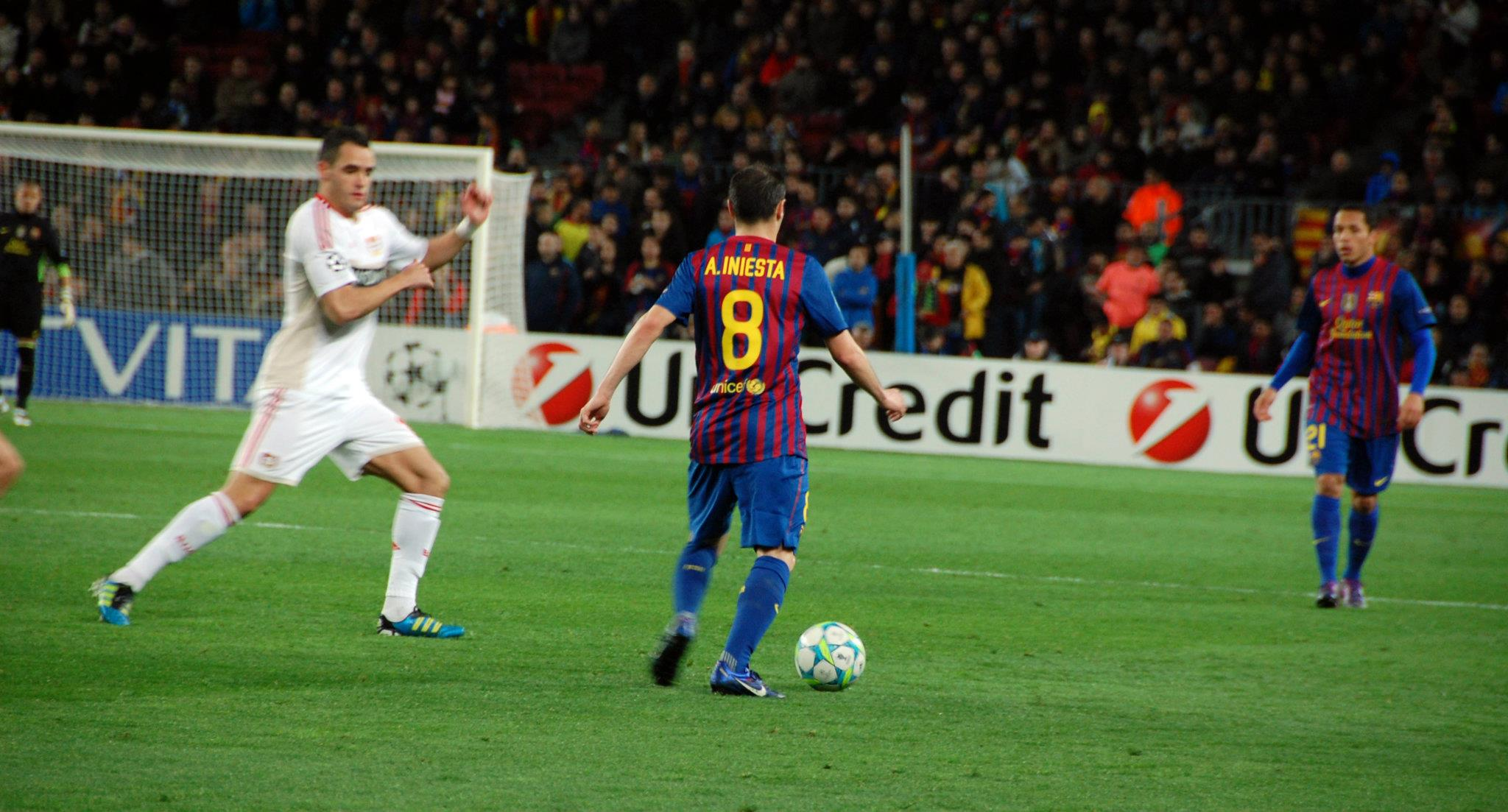
Iniesta on the ball for Barcelona against Bayer Leverkusen in 2012

Like fellow La Masia graduate Cesc Fàbregas, Iniesta originally started as a defensive midfielder, but his balance, ball control and agility in close spaces, allied with his skill, composure, and flair on the ball, saw him make progress as an attacking midfielder. Beyond his raw talent that was spotted at a young age by Barcelona's scouts, it was his great versatility, work ethic and inventiveness that allowed him to stake a claim on a first-team place at the age of 18. Vicente del Bosque described him as "A complete footballer. He can attack and defend, he creates and scores," and Frank Rijkaard said: "I played him as a false winger, central midfielder, deep midfielder and just behind the striker and he was always excellent." He was used initially as a wide-forward in the absence of Juan Román Riquelme and Ronaldinho by Louis van Gaal and Rijkaard respectively, but made his name as a world-class player in central midfield alongside or in lieu of Xavi, at both club and international level. As FIFA.com said, "It is in this position that his direct style and quick feet can be used to full effect, with the ball seeming glued to his toes as he races into threatening positions." A diminutive midfielder, Iniesta was a player known for his passing, technique, vision and movement; he was also highly regarded for his ability to read the game, as well as his acceleration, and close control at speed, which — when combined with his low centre of gravity — rendered him one of the most skilled dribblers of all time, by allowing him to change direction quickly, get past opponents, and undertake individual runs with the ball, despite not being particularly quick. Moreover, Iniesta's former manager Guardiola praised him for "his mastery of the relationship between space and time", which he utilises to his advantage in order to disorient opposing players when in possession. His signature move was La Croqueta – a move pioneered by Michael Laudrup and popularised by Iniesta – where he quickly pushed the ball from his right foot to his left which took the ball away from an opponent, allowing him to get out of a tight situation. His role was also likened to that of a mezzala, in Italian football jargon, namely an offensive–minded box–to-box or central midfielder.

"The one who plays this game the best is Iniesta: he knows exactly when to go forward and when to drop back. He picks the right moment to do everything: when to dribble, when to speed things up and when to slow things down. And I think that's the only thing that can't be taught or bought. You can learn how to shoot and how to control the ball, but being aware of everything that's happening out on the pitch – that's something you're either born with or you're not."

— Former Argentina playmaker Juan Román Riquelme on Iniesta

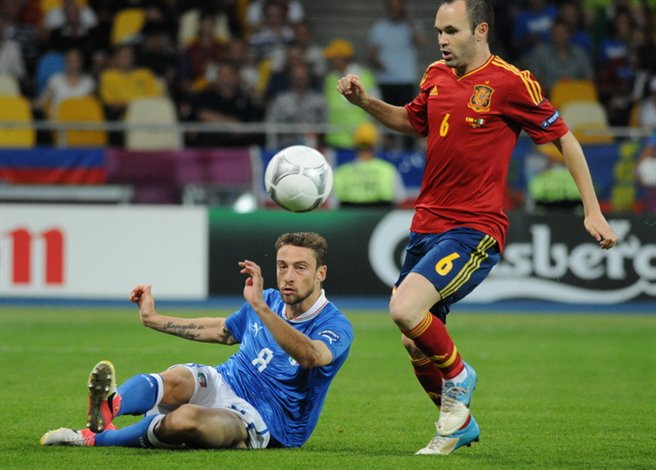
Iniesta evades Claudio Marchisio during the UEFA Euro 2012 final

Much like other Barcelona youth products such as Pep Guardiola, Xavi and Iván de la Peña, Iniesta was a playmaker who relied on his technique, passing, intuition, movement and inventiveness to control the midfield, dictate the ebb and flow of play, and create chances or space for teammates. Iniesta was praised for his understanding and interplay with Xavi; former Barcelona teammate Giovanni van Bronckhorst said of the pair: "They have a special relationship, they always have, they just seem to know where the other one is." Despite not being particularly prolific in front of goal, during his maturation as a player, Iniesta gained a reputation of being a big-game player for club and country, assisting a goal in each of the 2009, 2011 and 2015 UEFA Champions League finals, as well as scoring the winner in the 2010 World Cup final, not to sideline his vital contributions in the 2006 Champions League final, the Euro 2008 final, and the Euro 2012 final, being known for his ability to score from powerful strikes outside the box. He is also the only footballer in history to win the Man of the Match award in a World Cup final, a European Championship final, and a UEFA Champions League final.

Iniesta earned the nickname sobriquet El Ilusionista (The Illusionist), El Cerebro (The Brain), El Anti-Galáctico (a pun on Real Madrid players' nickname Los Galácticos), El Caballero Pálido (The Pale Knight) and more recently Don Andrés from the Spanish press. He is regarded by many in the sport as one of the most respected and best midfielders, and as one of the greatest passers and playmakers. Despite his reserved personality, he was also known for his leadership.

== Media and sponsorship ==
Iniesta had a sponsorship deal with sportswear company Nike, and has appeared in Nike commercials alongside Cristiano Ronaldo, Neymar, Zlatan Ibrahimović and Wayne Rooney. Iniesta features in EA Sports' FIFA video game series, and was the sixth-highest rated player in FIFA 15. Iniesta's signature move, La Croqueta, features in FIFA 19. In March 2015, Iniesta had the ninth highest social media rank in the world among sportspeople, with 24 million Facebook fans. On 22 October 2018, Iniesta signed a new sponsorship deal with Japanese sportswear company Asics, with his first signature boot being released on 15 July 2019.

== Personal life ==
Iniesta is married to Anna Ortiz; the couple began dating in 2008 and got married on 8 July 2012. They have three daughters and two sons, born between 2011 and 2023. The couple lost an unborn child, a son, due to miscarriage in March 2014. Iniesta is a Catholic.

In 2011, Iniesta invested €420,000 in his boyhood club, Albacete, thus becoming its major shareholder. Two years later, with the club facing administrative relegation to the fourth tier of Spanish football, he loaned them a further €240,000 to cover unpaid wages.

In May 2018, Iniesta revealed to Risto Mejide that he suffered from depression before the 2010 FIFA World Cup due to his injuries and the death of Daniel Jarque.

In September 2018, Iniesta alongside German footballer (and Vissel Kobe team-mate) Lukas Podolski campaigned and donated money for the victims of the Hokkaido Eastern Iburi earthquake in Japan.

Iniesta is actively involved as co-founder of the NSN Cycling Team, which launched officially in Barcelona in December 2025 ahead of the 2026 season. Iniesta attended the team's kit unveiling event, expressing his passion for cycling alongside football and highlighting ambitions for sprint races, stage hunts in Grand Tours, and the 2026 Tour de France Grand Départ in Barcelona. The Swiss-licensed squad, rebranded from Israel-Premier Tech, features star signing Biniam Girmay and riders like Alexey Lutsenko, with bases in Barcelona and Girona.

== Career statistics ==
=== Club ===
Appearances and goals by club, season and competition
Club	Season	League			National cup (Note: Includes Copa del Rey, Emperor's Cup, UAE President's Cup)		League cup (Note: Includes J.League Cup, UAE League Cup)		Continental		Other		Total	
Club	Season	Division	Apps	Goals	Apps	Goals	Apps	Goals	Apps	Goals	Apps	Goals	Apps	Goals
Barcelona B	2000–01	Segunda División B	10	0	—		—		—		—		10	0
Barcelona B	2001–02	Segunda División B	25	2	—		—		—		5 (Note: Appearances in Segunda División B play-offs)	0	30	2
Barcelona B	2002–03	Segunda División B	14	3	—		—		—		—		14	3
Barcelona B	Total		49	5	—		—		—		5	0	54	5
Barcelona	2002–03	La Liga	6	0	0	0	—		3 (Note: Appearances in UEFA Champions League)	0	—		9	0
Barcelona	2003–04	La Liga	11	1	3	1	—		3 (Note: Appearances in UEFA Cup)	0	–		17	2
Barcelona	2004–05	La Liga	37	2	1	0	—		8	0	—		46	2
Barcelona	2005–06	La Liga	33	0	4	0	—		11	1	1 (Note: Appearance(s) in Supercopa de España)	0	49	1
Barcelona	2006–07	La Liga	37	6	6	1	—		8	2	5 (Note: One appearance in UEFA Super Cup, two appearances in Supercopa de España, two appearances in FIFA Club World Cup)	0	56	9
Barcelona	2007–08	La Liga	31	3	7	0	—		11	1	—		49	4
Barcelona	2008–09	La Liga	26	4	6	0	—		11	1	—		43	5
Barcelona	2009–10	La Liga	29	1	3	0	—		9	0	1 (Note: Appearance in FIFA Club World Cup)	0	42	1
Barcelona	2010–11	La Liga	34	8	5	0	—		10	1	1	0	50	9
Barcelona	2011–12	La Liga	27	2	6	2	—		8	3	5 (Note: One appearance in UEFA Super Cup, two appearances and one goal in Supercopa de España, two appearances in FIFA Club World Cup)	1	46	8
Barcelona	2012–13	La Liga	31	3	5	2	—		10	1	2	0	48	6
Barcelona	2013–14	La Liga	35	3	6	0	—		9	0	2	0	52	3
Barcelona	2014–15	La Liga	24	0	7	3	—		11	0	—		42	3
Barcelona	2015–16	La Liga	28	1	4	0	—		7	0	5 (Note: One appearance in UEFA Super Cup, two appearances in Supercopa de España, two appearances in FIFA Club World Cup)	0	44	1
Barcelona	2016–17	La Liga	23	0	5	0	—		8	1	1	0	37	1
Barcelona	2017–18	La Liga	30	1	5	1	—		8	0	1	0	44	2
Barcelona	Total		442	35	73	10	—		135	11	24	1	674	57
Vissel Kobe	2018	J1 League	14	3	1	0	0	0	—		—		15	3
Vissel Kobe	2019	J1 League	23	6	2	1	0	0	—		—		25	7
Vissel Kobe	2020	J1 League	26	4	0	0	1	0	6 (Note: Appearance(s) in AFC Champions League)	2	1 (Note: Appearance in Japanese Super Cup)	0	34	6
Vissel Kobe	2021	J1 League	23	6	0	0	4	1	—		—		27	7
Vissel Kobe	2022	J1 League	24	2	1	0	1	0	1	1	—		27	3
Vissel Kobe	2023	J1 League	4	0	0	0	2	0	—		—		6	0
Vissel Kobe	Total		114	21	4	1	8	1	7	3	1	0	134	26
Emirates	2023–24	UAE Pro League	20	5	1	0	2	0	—		—		23	5
Career total			625	66	78	11	10	1	142	14	30	1	885	93

=== International ===
Appearances and goals by year and competition
National team	Year	Competitive		Friendly		Total	
National team	Year	Apps	Goals	Apps	Goals	Apps	Goals
Spain	2006	3 (Note: One appearance in 2006 FIFA World Cup, two appearances in UEFA Euro 2008 qualifying)	0	5	0	8	0
Spain	2007	9 (Note: Appearances in UEFA Euro 2008 qualifying)	3	3	1	12	4
Spain	2008	10 (Note: Six appearances at UEFA Euro 2008, four appearances and one goal in 2010 FIFA World Cup qualification)	1	4	0	14	1
Spain	2009	2 (Note: Appearances in 2010 FIFA World Cup qualification)	0	3	0	5	0
Spain	2010	9 (Note: Six appearances and two goals in 2010 FIFA World Cup, three appearances and one goal in UEFA Euro 2012 qualifying)	3	6	0	15	3
Spain	2011	2 (Note: Appearances in UEFA Euro 2012 qualifying)	0	7	1	9	1
Spain	2012	9 (Note: Six appearances at UEFA Euro 2012, three appearances in 2014 FIFA World Cup qualification)	0	5	1	14	1
Spain	2013	10 (Note: Five appearances in 2014 FIFA World Cup qualification, five appearances in 2013 FIFA Confederations Cup)	0	7	0	17	0
Spain	2014	5 (Note: Three appearances in 2014 FIFA World Cup, two appearances in UEFA Euro 2016 qualifying)	0	3	1	8	1
Spain	2015	3 (Note: Appearances in UEFA Euro 2016 qualifying)	1	2	0	5	1
Spain	2016	6 (Note: Four appearances at UEFA Euro 2016, two appearances in 2018 FIFA World Cup qualification)	0	2	0	8	0
Spain	2017	4 (Note: Appearances in 2018 FIFA World Cup qualification)	0	4	1	8	1
Spain	2018	4 (Note: Appearances in 2018 FIFA World Cup)	0	4	0	8	0
Total		76	8	55	5	131	13

Scores and results list Spain's goal tally first, score column indicates score after each Iniesta goal.

List of international goals scored by Andrés Iniesta
No.	Date	Venue	Opponent	Score	Result	Competition
1	7 February 2007	Old Trafford, Manchester, England	England	1–0	1–0	Friendly
2	28 March 2007	Iberostar Stadium, Palma, Spain	Iceland	1–0	1–0	UEFA Euro 2008 qualifying
3	8 September 2007	Laugardalsvöllur, Reykjavík, Iceland	Iceland	1–1	1–1	UEFA Euro 2008 qualifying
4	17 November 2007	Santiago Bernabéu Stadium, Madrid, Spain	Sweden	2–0	3–0	UEFA Euro 2008 qualifying
5	25 October 2008	King Baudouin Stadium, Brussels, Belgium	Belgium	1–1	2–1	2010 FIFA World Cup qualification
6	25 June 2010	Loftus Versfeld, Pretoria, South Africa	Chile	2–0	2–1	2010 FIFA World Cup
7	11 July 2010	FNB Stadium, Johannesburg, South Africa	Netherlands	1–0	1–0	2010 FIFA World Cup final
8	12 October 2010	Hampden Park, Glasgow, Scotland	Scotland	2–0	3–2	UEFA Euro 2012 qualifying
9	2 September 2011	Kybunpark, St. Gallen, Switzerland	Chile	1–2	3–2	Friendly
10	29 February 2012	La Rosaleda Stadium, Málaga, Spain	Venezuela	1–0	5–0	Friendly
11	30 May 2014	Ramón Sánchez Pizjuán Stadium, Seville, Spain	Bolivia	2–0	2–0	Friendly
12	5 September 2015	Carlos Tartiere Stadium, Oviedo, Spain	Slovakia	2–0	2–0	UEFA Euro 2016 qualifying
13	11 November 2017	La Rosaleda Stadium, Málaga, Spain	Costa Rica	5–0	5–0	Friendly

== Managerial statistics ==
As of 10 September 2026

Managerial record by team and tenure
Team	Nat.	From	To	Record								Ref.
Team	Nat.	From	To	G	W	D	L	GF	GA	GD	Win %	Ref.
Gulf United	(United Arab Emirates)	1 July 2026	Present	2	0	0	2	5	7	−2	0.00	
Career Total				2	0	0	2	5	7	−2	0.00	

== Honours ==
Barcelona

- La Liga: 2004–05, 2005–06, 2008–09, 2009–10, 2010–11, 2012–13, 2014–15, 2015–16, 2017–18
- Copa del Rey: 2008–09, 2011–12, 2014–15, 2015–16, 2016–17, 2017–18
- Supercopa de España: 2005, 2006, 2010, 2011, 2013, 2016
- UEFA Champions League: 2005–06, 2008–09, 2010–11, 2014–15
- UEFA Super Cup: 2011, 2015
- FIFA Club World Cup: 2009, 2011, 2015

Vissel Kobe

- Emperor's Cup: 2019
- Japanese Super Cup: 2020
- J1 League: 2023

Spain U16

- UEFA European Under-16 Championship: 2001

Spain U19

- UEFA European Under-19 Championship: 2002

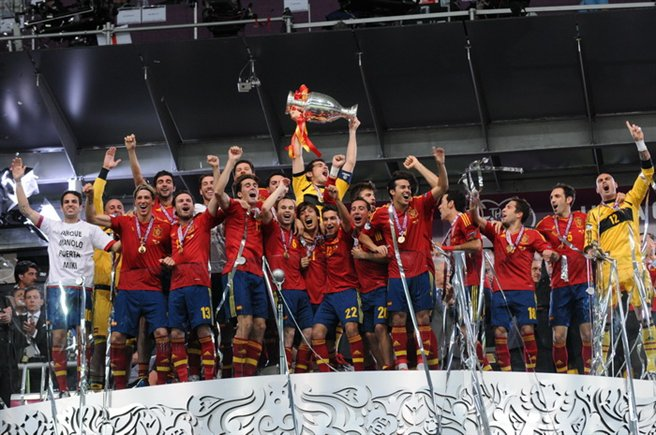
Iniesta and his teammates celebrate winning UEFA Euro 2012.

Spain

- FIFA World Cup: 2010
- UEFA European Championship: 2008, 2012

Individual

- UEFA Euro Team of the Tournament: 2008, 2012
- La Liga Best Spanish Player: 2009
- La Liga Best Midfielder: 2009, 2011, 2012, 2013, 2014
- FIFA FIFPro World11: 2009, 2010, 2011, 2012, 2013, 2014, 2015, 2016, 2017
- UEFA Team of the Year: 2009, 2010, 2011, 2012, 2015, 2016
- Onze de Bronze: 2009
- FIFA World Cup Dream Team: 2010
- ESM Team of the Year: 2010–11, 2017–18
- Onze d'Argent: 2011
- Marca Legend Award: 2011
- UEFA Best Player in Europe Award: 2012
- UEFA Euro Player of the Tournament: 2012
- IFFHS World's Best Playmaker: 2012, 2013
- IFFHS World Team of the Decade 2011–2020
- IFFHS UEFA Team of the decade 2011–2020
- FIFA Confederations Cup Silver Ball: 2013
- La Liga top assist provider: 2012–13
- Golden Foot: 2014
- UEFA Champions League Squad of the Season: 2014–15, 2015–16
- UEFA Ultimate Team of the Year (published 2015)
- FIFA Club World Cup Bronze Ball: 2015
- France Football World XI: 2015
- La Liga Team of the Season: 2015–16
- UEFA Euro All-time XI (published 2016)
- J.League Best XI: 2019, 2021
- Ballon d'Or Dream Team (Bronze): 2020
- Globe Soccer Awards Player Career Award: 2025 (shared)
- Barça Players' Award: 2010–11

Decorations

- Prince of Asturias Awards: 2010
- Gold Medal of the Royal Order of Sporting Merit: 2011
- Queen Sofia Award: 2017
- Grand Cross of the Royal Order of Sports Merit: 2018

== See also ==
- List of footballers with 100 or more UEFA Champions League appearances
- List of men's footballers with 100 or more international caps
- List of men's footballers with the most official appearances
- List of celebrities who own wineries and vineyards
- List of FC Barcelona players (150+ appearances)
- List of La Liga players (400+ appearances)
- List of footballers with 400 or more La Liga appearances

Sporting positions
Preceded by Xavi	FC Barcelona captain 2015–2018	Succeeded by Lionel Messi
