= Víctor Valdés =

Spanish footballer (born 1982)

Victor Valdés
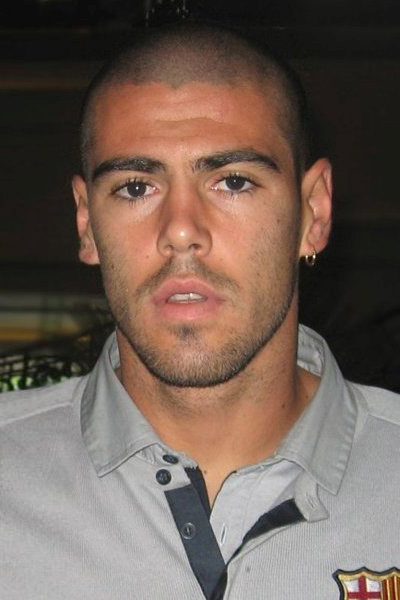
- Valdés in 2010

Personal information
- Full name: Víctor Valdés Arribas
- Date of birth: 14 January 1982 (age 44)
- Place of birth: L'Hospitalet de Llobregat, Spain
- Height: 1.83 m (6 ft 0 in)
- Position: Goalkeeper

Youth career
- 1992: Cinco Copas
- 1992–1995: Ibarra
- 1995–2000: Barcelona

Senior career*
Years	Team	Apps	(Gls)
2000	Barcelona C	16	(0)
2000–2003	Barcelona B	71	(0)
2002–2014	Barcelona	387	(0)
2015–2016	Manchester United	2	(0)
2016	→ Standard Liège (loan)	5	(0)
2016–2017	Middlesbrough	28	(0)
Total		509	(0)

International career
2000–2001	Spain U18	11	(0)
2001	Spain U19	3	(0)
2001	Spain U20	1	(0)
2002–2003	Spain U21	11	(0)
2010–2014	Spain	20	(0)

Managerial career
- 2020–2021: Horta
- 2025: Real Ávila
Medal record
Men's football
Representing Spain
FIFA World Cup
Winner	2010 South Africa
UEFA European Championship
Winner	2012 Poland-Ukraine
FIFA Confederations Cup
Runner-up	2013 Brazil
- * Club domestic league appearances and goals

Víctor Valdés Arribas (Spanish pronunciation: [ˈbiɣtoɾ βalˈdes aˈriβas]; born 14 January 1982) is a Spanish football coach and former professional player who played as a goalkeeper.

He spent most of his professional career with Barcelona in La Liga appearing in 535 official games whilst winning 21 major titles. Valdés won the Ricardo Zamora Trophy for the league's least scored-against goalkeeper five times, four of which consecutively. After leaving Barcelona in 2014, he played for Manchester United, Standard Liège and Middlesbrough before retiring in 2017.

Valdés played 20 games for Spain between 2010 and 2014, with most of his international career being as a back-up to Iker Casillas and Pepe Reina. He was part of the Barcelona team that defeated Real Madrid 6–2 and 5–0, respectively, in 2009 and 2010.

== Club career ==
=== Early career ===
Valdés was born in L'Hospitalet de Llobregat, Barcelona, Catalonia, and raised in nearby Gavà, while his family was originally from Puebla de Sanabria in the Province of Zamora. Valdés started his career with Peña Cinco Copas in 1992. That September, he moved with his family to Tenerife, where he joined UD Ibarra, and he returned to Catalonia in 1995 to join FC Barcelona's La Masia academy.

=== Barcelona ===
Valdés made his first team debut against Legia Warsaw in the third qualifying round of the UEFA Champions League on 14 August 2002. It was the first game of manager Louis van Gaal's second spell at the club, and Valdés was a surprise pick over Argentine international Roberto Bonano in the 3–0 win at the Camp Nou. On 1 September, he played his first La Liga game as the season began with a 2–2 draw at home to Atlético Madrid. Van Gaal dropped Valdés to the B-team and he considered leaving the club before being convinced to stay by president Joan Gaspart; in all competitions he played 20 games in his first season.

In the 2003–04 season, new manager Frank Rijkaard chose Valdés as first-choice goalkeeper over veteran Turkish international Rüştü Reçber, due to concerns over the latter's Spanish language ability. In 2004–05, Barcelona won their first league title since 1999, and Valdés won the Ricardo Zamora Trophy for conceding the fewest goals; he was rested for the final games of the season in favour of fellow academy player Albert Jorquera, so that he could win the personal honour.

In 2005–06, Valdés helped Barça to the continental double in Europe. In the 2005–06 UEFA Champions League winning campaign, he saved from Arsenal forward Thierry Henry as Barcelona came from behind to win the final 2–1 at the Stade de France. Rijkaard singled him out for praise for this save, and teammate Deco said that the comeback would never have happened without the stop.

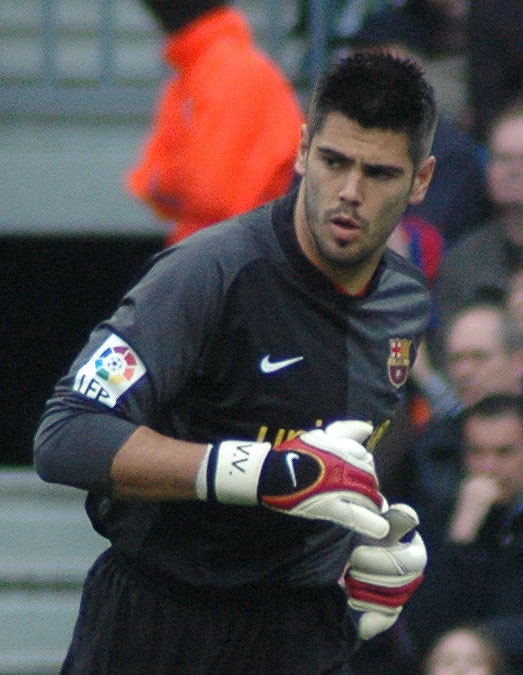
Valdés playing for Barcelona during a match against Mallorca in 2007

On 17 June 2007, in the last match of La Liga, Valdés matched a goalkeeping record held by former Barcelona goalkeeper Andoni Zubizarreta by starting, and never being substituted, in all 38 matches of the La Liga season.

"For me, Valdes is the best in the world. When Barça need calm, he transmits that. He also has great capacity and handling."

— Former Paraguay international goalkeeper José Luis Chilavert, February 2012

Valdés set the Barcelona club record for not conceding a goal in European competition with a clean sheet against Rangers on 7 November 2007, which saw him re-write the Barça record books after not conceding a goal for 466 minutes. Valdés was beaten twice by Lyon captain Juninho through a 45-yard free kick and a late penalty kick at the Stade de Gerland, ending his streak. In the 2006–07 and 2007–08 seasons, however, Barça failed to win a major trophy. On 3 February 2008, Valdés captained Barcelona for the first time in a 1-0 league win at home against Osasuna.

On 27 May 2009, Barcelona beat Manchester United 2–0 in the 2009 UEFA Champions League Final at the Stadio Olimpico in Rome to complete an unprecedented treble of La Liga, Champions League, and Copa del Rey. In the match, Valdés made two saves from attempts by Cristiano Ronaldo in both halves. In the first half, he saved a long-range free kick, and in the second half, he saved the other from Ronaldo, coming from a tight angle following a low cross from striker Dimitar Berbatov.

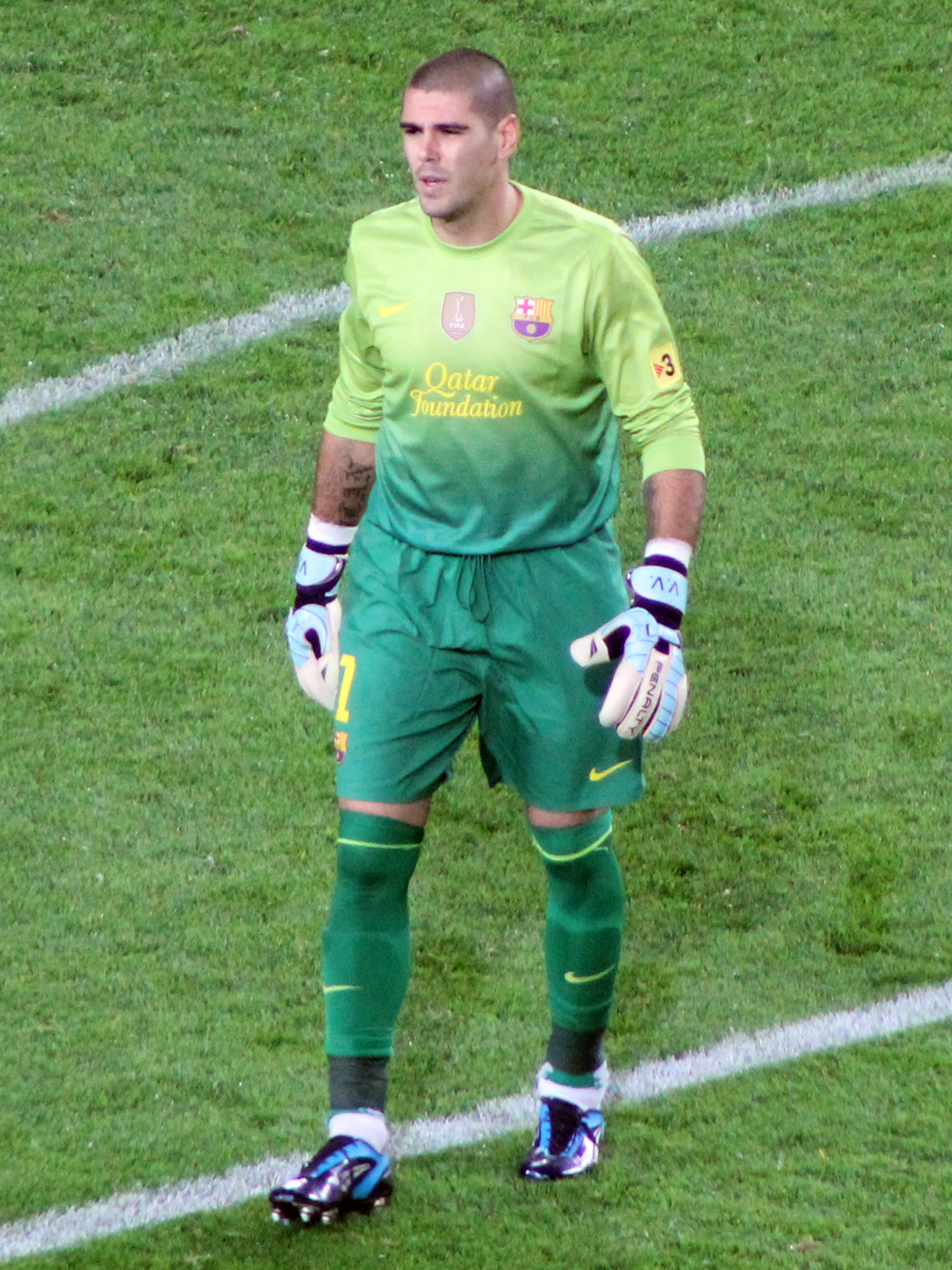
Valdés playing for Barcelona in 2012

On 16 May 2010, Valdés won his fourth league title as Barcelona clinched a second successive Spanish league title with Pep Guardiola's side, ending the season with 99 points.

On 29 August 2011, Valdés played his 410th match with Barcelona and equaled Andoni Zubizarreta's record as Barcelona's goalkeeper with the most appearances.

"For me, the three best goalkeepers in the world are Casillas, Buffon, and Valdes."

— Former Real Madrid goalkeeper Bodo Illgner, February 2013

In 2012, Valdés made a goalkeeping error against Real Madrid in the Supercopa de España that culminated in Ángel Di María scoring a decisive goal and narrowing down Barcelona's two-goal advantage. Real Madrid went on to win the Super Cup in the second leg at the Santiago Bernabéu.

On 1 May 2013, in a 3–0 Champions League semi-final loss to Bayern Munich at Camp Nou, Valdés made his 100th appearance in the competition, becoming the 17th player to do so. Later that month, Valdés announced that he would not renew his Barcelona contract, which was due to expire at the end of the 2013–14 season. He cited the pressure of representing the club and stated that he had declared his wish to leave early enough for the club to find a replacement.

On 26 March 2014, in a 3–0 victory against Celta Vigo, Valdés tore his anterior cruciate ligament in the 22nd minute of the match and was substituted off, and was ruled out for the rest of the season, ending his Barcelona career and ruling him out of the 2014 FIFA World Cup.

He currently holds the club records as goalkeeper with most appearances in the league and in official competition, breaking Andoni Zubizarreta's records during the 2011–12 season.

=== Manchester United ===
In January 2014, prior to the conclusion of his contract with Barcelona, Valdés signed a pre-contract agreement to join Ligue 1 side Monaco at the end of the season; however, Valdés' injury led to Monaco pulling out of the agreement. On 23 October 2014, Manchester United offered Valdés the chance to complete his rehabilitation from a knee injury and to work his way back to fitness with the club. He was offered a contract in January 2015, and on 8 January signed an 18-month deal, with the option of a further year, as backup for compatriot David de Gea. As part of a compensation package for reneging on their deal with Valdés, Monaco agreed to pay the difference between the £150,000 weekly wage he stood to earn with them and the lower salary offered by Manchester United.

Valdés played his first match since his knee injury on 26 January, featuring for United's Under-21 team in a 2–1 home win over Liverpool. Before the game, he gave a team talk based on the teachings of his former manager Guardiola. He made his first-team debut on 17 May against Arsenal at Old Trafford, replacing the injured De Gea for the final 16 minutes and conceding an own goal by Tyler Blackett for a 1–1 draw. A week later he made his first start for the team in their last game of the season away to Hull City, keeping a clean sheet in a goalless draw which relegated the opponents.

On 15 July 2015, Manchester United manager Louis van Gaal announced that Valdés had been placed on the transfer list after it was claimed he had refused to play in a reserve game. The following month, he was not given a squad number for the upcoming season. A transfer to Turkey's Beşiktaş fell through as personal terms could not be agreed. Despite subsequently being named in Manchester United's Premier League squad, reports confirmed Valdés was only named to conform to Premier League rules and not being offered a way back.

=== Standard Liège ===
On 23 January 2016, Manchester United announced that Valdés would be moving to Belgian club Standard Liège on a six-month loan deal. He made his debut a week later in a 2–0 win at OH Leuven in the Belgian Pro League. On 20 March, Valdés won the 2016 Belgian Cup Final, beating Club Brugge 2–1. His loan spell was cut short on 29 April after the club decided to allow more youth players the opportunity to play in games at the end of the season.

=== Middlesbrough ===
On 7 July 2016, Valdés signed a two-year deal on a free transfer at recently promoted Middlesbrough, managed by compatriot Aitor Karanka. On 13 August 2016, Valdés made his debut in a 1–1 draw against Stoke City. On 22 October 2016, Valdés kept his first clean sheet of the season in a 0–0 draw against Arsenal. The club entered the relegation zone in March 2017 after a 2–0 loss to Stoke City, with Karanka sacked later that month. Valdés, as well as fellow goalkeeper Brad Guzan, left the club on 1 July 2017. Although he had offers from several clubs in Spain to prolong his career, Valdés retired from professional football in August 2017; after remaining without a club for the first half of the 2017–18 season, he later confirmed his official retirement in January 2018.

== International career ==
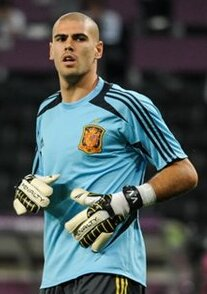
Valdés with Spain at the UEFA Euro 2012

On 16 August 2005, Valdés was called up for a friendly game against Uruguay, but did not take the field. After being overlooked by various coaches of the Spanish national side for several years, on 20 May 2010, he was included by Vicente del Bosque in Spain's final 23-man squad for the 2010 FIFA World Cup in South Africa as the third-choice goalkeeper behind captain Iker Casillas and Pepe Reina wearing the number 12 shirt.

On 3 June 2010, Valdés earned his first cap, starting in a friendly match between Spain and South Korea at Tivoli-Neu in Innsbruck, Austria. Valdés was part of the Spanish squads that won the 2010 FIFA World Cup and UEFA Euro 2012, despite not playing in either tournament.

He was also in the Spanish squad which reached the final of the 2013 FIFA Confederations Cup in Brazil, losing out 3–0 to the hosts. His sole appearance in a major tournament came in their last group game, keeping a clean sheet in a 3–0 win over Nigeria at the Estádio Castelão in Fortaleza.

== Style of play ==
Valdés was considered fiercely competitive and demanding, demonstrating great mental strength and concentration to be alert during long spells of ball domination, and was superb at one-on-ones.

In his prime, Valdés was considered to be a successful and generally high quality goalkeeper, albeit somewhat inconsistent, and is regarded as one of Barcelona's best ever goalkeepers. An authoritative presence in the area, with good reflexes, handling, positioning, and shot-stopping abilities, he was known for his agility and composure in goal, as well as his ability to produce decisive saves, in particular after not being tested for long stretches of time; however, he was also prone to errors on occasion, in particular in his early career. In addition to his goalkeeping abilities, he was known in particular for his vision, footwork, distribution, control and skill with the ball at his feet, which enabled him to play the ball out on the ground or launch an attack from the back; throughout his career, he also stood out for his intelligence, ability to read the game, and his speed and bravery when coming off his line to claim the ball on the ground in one on one situations, and also excelled at anticipating opponents outside his area who had beaten the offside trap, and often functioned as a sweeper-keeper.

== Coaching career ==
On 1 June 2018, Valdés returned to football as a manager by acquiring his UEFA Pro Licence alongside compatriots such as Xavi, Raúl and Xabi Alonso. Valdés started coaching amateur side ED Moratalaz's youth ranks, where he achieved two regional titles. On 19 July 2019, Valdés returned to Barcelona to coach its Juvenil A side. He was sacked on 7 October due to disagreements with La Masia director Patrick Kluivert.

Valdés returned to the touchline in May 2020, when he was appointed the manager of UA Horta in the fourth-tier Tercera División. He left in January 2021 in order to 'focus on Joan Laporta's presidential project' as reported by Mundo Deportivo, with Laporta wanting to make Valdes part of the new board if he won the presidential election in March 2021.

On 24 April 2025, Valdés was appointed by Real Ávila CF with two games left of the fourth-tier Segunda Federación season on a contract until the end of the following campaign; Miguel de la Fuente had already qualified the team for the promotion playoffs. On 19 May, after semi-final elimination to CP Cacereño, he resigned; his four-game record was split between wins and losses.

== Personal life ==
Valdés married Colombian model Yolanda Cardona in June 2017 in a Catholic ceremony attended by former Barcelona teammates and dignitaries. The couple have two sons and a daughter.

== Career statistics ==
=== Club ===
Appearances and goals by club, season and competition
Club	Season	League			Cup		League Cup		Europe		Other (Note: Includes other competitive competitions, including the Segunda División B playoffs, Supercopa de España, UEFA Super Cup, FIFA Club World Cup.)		Total	
Club	Season	Division	Apps	Goals	Apps	Goals	Apps	Goals	Apps	Goals	Apps	Goals	Apps	Goals
Barcelona C	1999–2000	Tercera División	16	0	—		—		—		—		16	0
Barcelona B	2000–01	Segunda División B	14	0	—		—		—		—		14	0
Barcelona B	2001–02	Segunda División B	37	0	—		—		—		6	0	43	0
Barcelona B	2002–03	Segunda División B	20	0	—		—		—		—		20	0
Barcelona B	Total		71	0	—		—		—		6	0	77	0
Barcelona	2002–03	La Liga	14	0	0	0	—		6	0	—		20	0
Barcelona	2003–04	La Liga	33	0	6	0	—		5	0	—		44	0
Barcelona	2004–05	La Liga	35	0	0	0	—		8	0	—		43	0
Barcelona	2005–06	La Liga	35	0	0	0	—		12	0	2	0	49	0
Barcelona	2006–07	La Liga	38	0	0	0	—		8	0	4	0	50	0
Barcelona	2007–08	La Liga	35	0	6	0	—		11	0	—		52	0
Barcelona	2008–09	La Liga	35	0	0	0	—		14	0	—		49	0
Barcelona	2009–10	La Liga	38	0	0	0	—		12	0	5	0	55	0
Barcelona	2010–11	La Liga	32	0	0	0	—		11	0	1	0	44	0
Barcelona	2011–12	La Liga	35	0	0	0	—		11	0	5	0	51	0
Barcelona	2012–13	La Liga	31	0	0	0	—		11	0	2	0	44	0
Barcelona	2013–14	La Liga	26	0	0	0	—		6	0	2	0	34	0
Barcelona	Total		387	0	12	0	—		115	0	21	0	535	0
Manchester United	2014–15	Premier League	2	0	0	0	0	0	—		—		2	0
Manchester United	2015–16	Premier League	0	0	0	0	0	0	0	0	—		0	0
Manchester United	Total		2	0	0	0	0	0	0	0	—		2	0
Standard Liège (loan)	2015–16	Belgian Pro League	5	0	2	0	—		—		1	0	8	0
Middlesbrough	2016–17	Premier League	28	0	0	0	0	0	—		0	0	28	0
Total career			509	0	13	0	0	0	115	0	28	0	666	0

=== International ===
National team	Year	Apps	Goals
Spain	2010	3	0
Spain	2011	4	0
Spain	2012	3	0
Spain	2013	9	0
Spain	2014	1	0
Spain	Total	20	0

== Honours ==
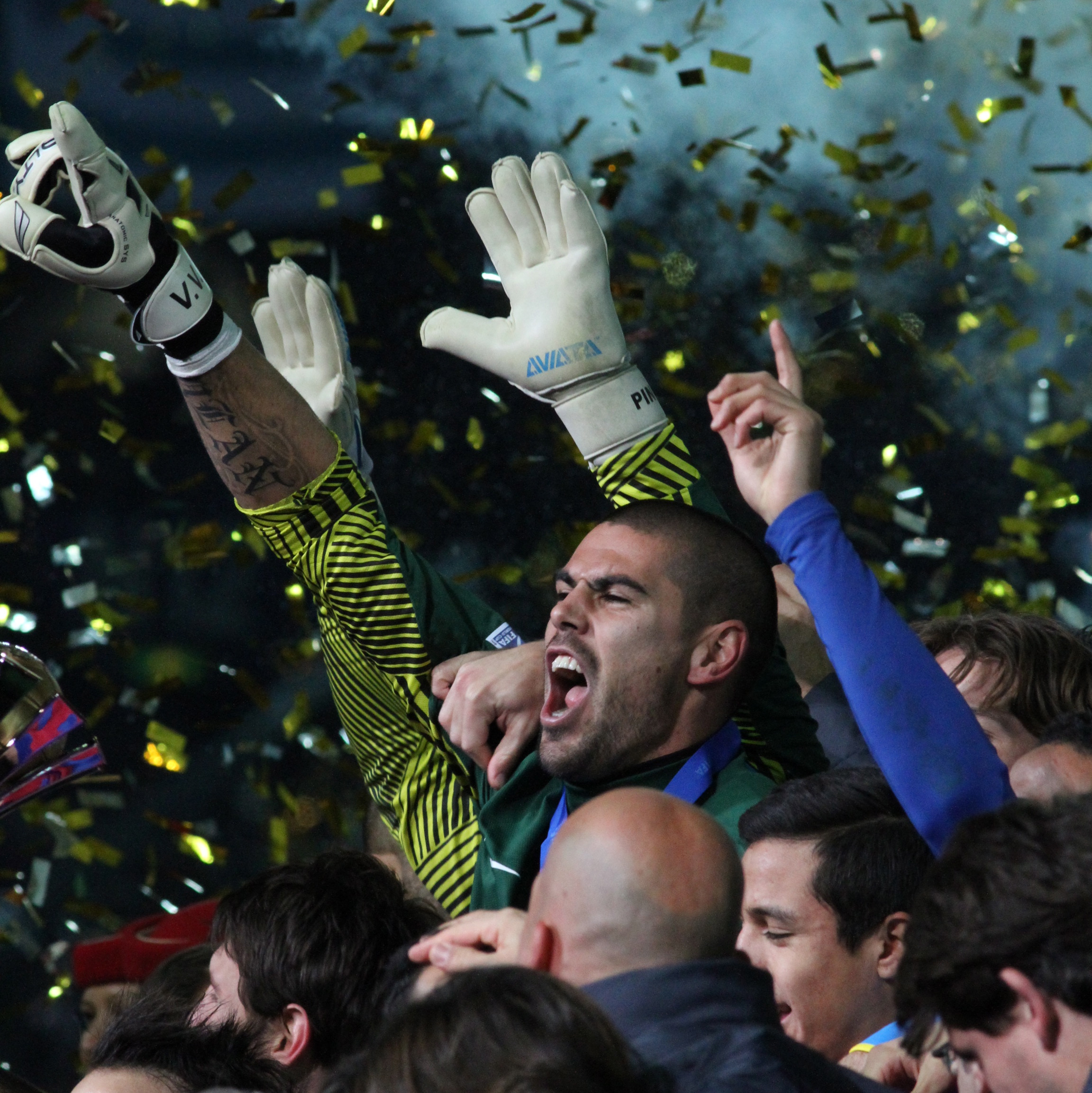
Valdés celebrating the 2011 FIFA Club World Cup triumph

Barcelona

- La Liga: 2004–05, 2005–06, 2008–09, 2009–10, 2010–11, 2012–13
- Copa del Rey: 2008–09, 2011–12
- Supercopa de España: 2005, 2006, 2009, 2010, 2011, 2013
- UEFA Champions League: 2005–06, 2008–09, 2010–11
- UEFA Super Cup: 2009, 2011
- FIFA Club World Cup: 2009, 2011

Standard Liège

- Belgian Cup: 2015–16

Spain

- FIFA World Cup: 2010
- UEFA European Championship: 2012

Individual

- Zamora Trophy: 2004–05, 2008–09, 2009–10, 2010–11, 2011–12
- La Liga Best Goalkeeper: 2009–10, 2010–11
- ESM Team of the Year: 2010–11

Orders

- Gold Medal of the Royal Order of Sporting Merit: 2011

== See also ==
- List of footballers with 100 or more UEFA Champions League appearances
