= Inma Puig =

Spanish sports psychologist

- Born: Barcelona, Spain
- Education: University of Barcelona
- Occupations: Sports psychologist; Clinical psychologist; Author; Professor
- Known for: Sports psychology; work with FC Barcelona and El Celler de Can Roca

Inma Puig is a Spanish sports psychologist who has worked closely with FC Barcelona.

== Career ==
A Barcelona native, Puig graduated in Clinical Psychology from the University of Barcelona. She has a five-year degree, a hospital internship and over 25 years of psychoanalysis experience. She is also a professor at IESE Business School, working in the Humans Resources Department. Puig uses the methods of Michael Balint. She has also authored the book Family Portraits: What You Wanted to Know and Didn't Dare to Ask About the Family Business (Editorial Empresa Activa).

Puig has worked at several different roles with Barcelona; working with Xavi Pascual for eight years, working at La Masia with the youth coaches, and working with Barcelona from 2003 to 2018, being hired by Dr. Jordi Monés for Frank Rijkaard.

Before joining Barcelona, Puig had worked with Andrés Iniesta, helping him with his depression.

From 2013, she has been in charge of the Emotional Management project, working with the kitchen staff at the El Celler de Can Roca.

In 2019, Puig announced her new book "The Emotional Revolution", which she described as a "reflection" book.
