= Fuentealbilla =

- Municipality
- Fuentealbilla
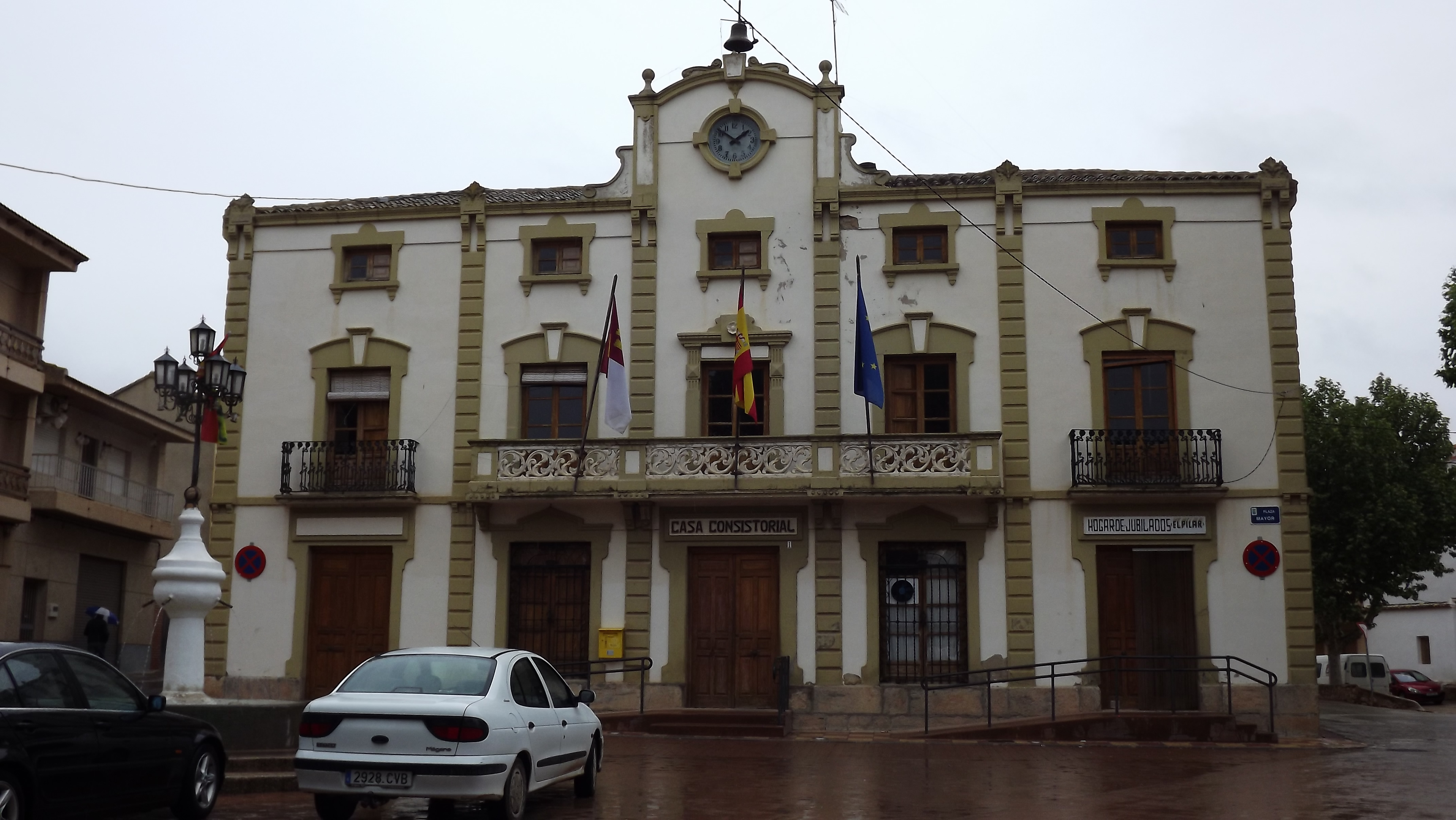
- Town hall

- Coat of arms

- Location in Spain Fuentealbilla (Spain)
- Coordinates: 39°16′00″N 1°32′57″W
- Country: Spain
- Autonomous community: Castile-La Mancha
- Province: Albacete
- Comarca: La Manchuela

Government
  - Alcalde: Ángel Salmerón Garrido (PP)

Area
  - Total: 109.02 km^{2} (42.09 sq mi)
- Elevation: 660 m (2,170 ft)

Population (2025-01-01)
  - Total: 1,804
  - Density: 16.55/km^{2} (42.86/sq mi)
- Time zone: UTC+1 (CET)
  - Summer (DST): UTC+2 (CEST)
- Postal code: 02260
- Official language(s): Castilian
- Website: www.fuentealbilla.es Notable People Andres Iniesta born 1984)

Fuentealbilla (Spanish pronunciation: [fwentealˈβiʎa]) is a village and municipality in the province of Albacete, Castile-La Mancha, Spain. It is located to the northeast of the city of Albacete and had a population of 2,421 in 2021.

Former Spain international footballer Andrés Iniesta was born in Fuentealbilla.

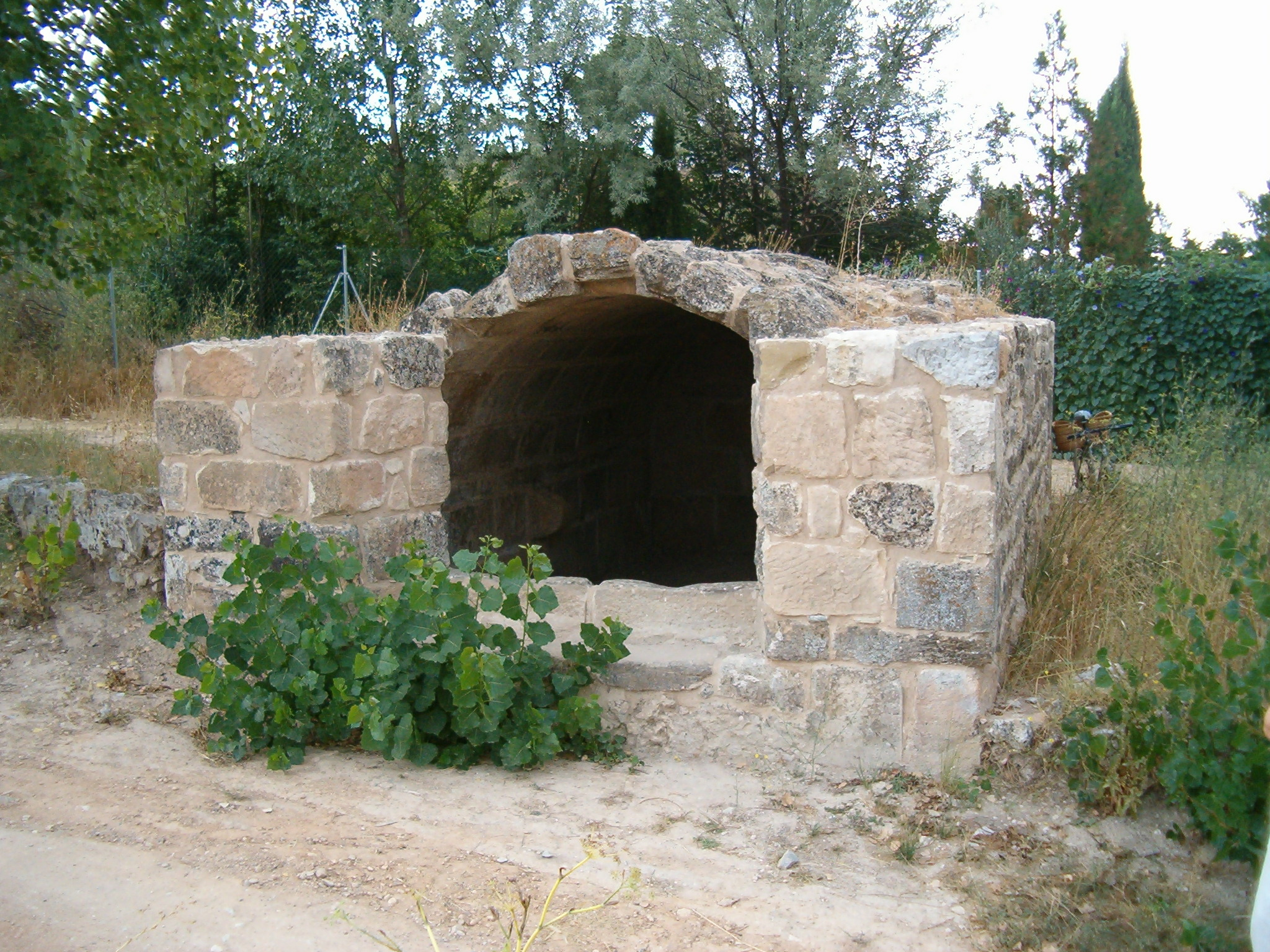
Roman cistern in Fuentealbilla
