= Ramón Ros =

Spanish footballer (born 1981)

Personal information
- Full name: Ramón Ros Badía
- Date of birth: 2 February 1981 (age 45)
- Place of birth: Barcelona, Spain
- Height: 1.84 m (6 ft 1/2 in)
- Position: Defensive midfielder

Youth career
- 1998–2000: Damm

Senior career*
Years	Team	Apps	(Gls)
2000–2001	Gavà	21	(1)
2001–2003	Barcelona C	36	(2)
2002–2005	Barcelona B	56	(3)
2003	Barcelona	1	(0)
2004–2005	→ Numancia (loan)	17	(0)
2005–2007	Lleida	16	(1)
Total		147	(7)
- * Club domestic league appearances and goals

Ramón Ros Badía (born 2 February 1981) is a Spanish retired footballer who played as a defensive midfielder.

== Club career ==
=== Barcelona ===
Born in Barcelona, Catalonia, Ros reached local FC Barcelona's youth system in 2001. He spent two seasons with the reserves in the third division.

On 2 September 2003, Ros played his first and only La Liga match with the Blaugrana, replacing fellow youth graduate Óscar López in the dying minutes of a 1–1 home draw against Sevilla FC. He was loaned to CD Numancia for the following season and appeared much more (14 starts, 1,106 minutes of action), but his team was eventually relegated from the top flight.

=== Lleida ===
Ros returned to his native region in the 2005 off-season, joining UE Lleida of the second level. After two injury-ravaged campaigns – no league appearances in his second year, after suffering relegation in his first – he was forced to retire from football, at only 26.
