= Enric Reyna =

Spanish businessman (1940–2026)

President of Barcelona Acting
- In office 12 February 2003 – 6 May 2003
- Preceded by: Joan Gaspart
- Succeeded by: Joan Laporta

Personal details
- Born: Enric Reyna i Martínez; 15 May 1940 Barcelona, Catalonia, Spain
- Died: 13 March 2026 (aged 85)

Enric Reyna i Martínez (15 May 1940 – 13 March 2026) was a Spanish businessman from Barcelona who became the 37th president of FC Barcelona on 12 February 2003, following the resignation of Joan Gaspart. Reyna joined the Catalan club's management in 2000 during the period of Gaspart's presidency. In December 2002, he became vice president of the club, then president from 12 February 2003. He left his post on 6 May 2003. Reyna died on 13 March 2026, at the age of 85.
