= Joan Gaspart =

Spanish businessman

36th President of FC Barcelona
- In office 23 July 2000 – 12 February 2003
- Preceded by: Josep Lluís Núñez
- Succeeded by: Enric Reyna

Personal details
- Born: Joan Gaspart Solves; 11 October 1944 (age 81) Barcelona, Catalonia, Spain

Joan Gaspart i Solves (Catalan pronunciation: [ʒuˈaŋ ɡəsˈpaɾt]; born 11 October 1944) is a Spanish businessman and a former Barcelona president between July 2000 and February 2003. He was born in Barcelona. He was vice president of the club during the presidency of Josep Lluís Nuñez between 1978 and 2000, before becoming president himself. He was heavily criticised for his presidency that lasted from 2000 to 2003, and also labelled himself as a poor president of the club. Gaspart spent the money from the sale of Luís Figo to Real Madrid, by buying Emmanuel Petit and Marc Overmars from Arsenal and Gerard from Valencia.

Gaspart stepped down as president of Barcelona in 2003, with the club two points off relegation.

From 2004 to 2011, he was president of football club Sant Andreu from Barcelona. In 2017, he became vice president of the Royal Spanish Football Federation (RFEF), and was responsible for Ángel María Villar's electoral campaign. Villar was president of the Royal Spanish Football Federation from 1988 to 2017, and vice president of both UEFA and FIFA.
