= 2007–08 FC Barcelona season =

109th season in existence of FC Barcelona

Barcelona
2007–08 season
- President: Joan Laporta
- Head Coach: Frank Rijkaard
- Stadium: Camp Nou
- La Liga: 3rd
- Copa del Rey: Semi-finals
- UEFA Champions League: Semi-finals
- Top goalscorer: League: Samuel Eto'o (16); All: Thierry Henry (19)
- Biggest win: Barcelona 6–0 Valencia
- Biggest defeat: Real Madrid 4–1 Barcelona
Home colours	Away colours	Third colours

Though it did not produce silverware, FC Barcelona's 2007–08 season would mark a period of change within the club, having many firsts and lasts. Most importantly, this would be Ronaldinho's last season with the club, being displaced by the coming of Arsenal legend Thierry Henry. This season also marked the breakthrough of young talent Bojan Krkić into the first team, as well as the emergence of Lionel Messi as one of the team's key players. On the other hand, this would be Lilian Thuram's last season as a professional footballer, as well as Gianluca Zambrotta's last with the club.

== Events ==
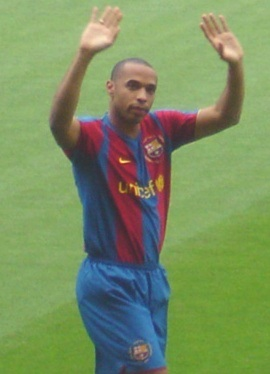
Thierry Henry, a €24 million move from Arsenal.

- 25 June: Thierry Henry moves from Arsenal to Barcelona for €24 million.
- 29 August: Nike will supply Barcelona until the 2017–18 season.
- 22 September: The Camp Nou turns 50 years old with a celebration full of music, light, and colour.
- 22 September: A large reform for the Camp Nou was revealed, with plans to make the Camp Nou bigger, with a retractable roof and better facilities.
- 20 October: Bojan becomes the youngest ever player to score for the club in La Liga.
- 26 October: Barça opens a community centre for children in Senegal.
- 20 March: Barcelona are knocked out of the Copa del Rey at the semi-final stage by Valencia.
- 8 May: The club announces that head coach Frank Rijkaard will leave the club when his contracts expires at the end of June, and that Pep Guardiola will replace him.

== Players ==
=== Squad information ===
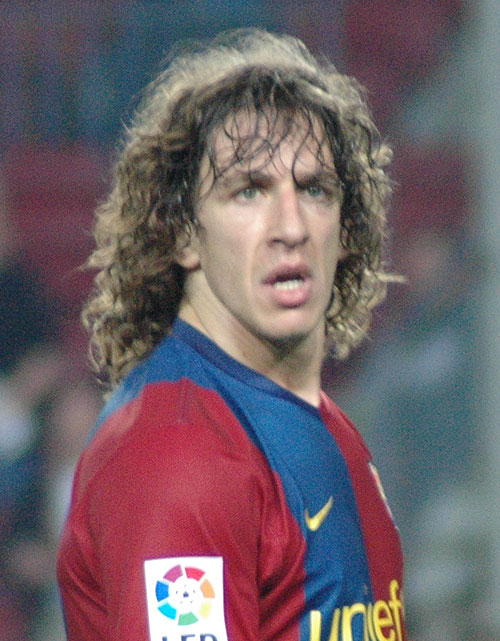
Carles Puyol, the captain of FC Barcelona in the 2007–08 season.

The squad has reasonably changed in the summer transfer window. The biggest addition was Thierry Henry, with a transfer fee of €24 million. That equals the transfer fee paid for Samuel Eto'o in 2004, but just below the €30 million paid for Ronaldinho in 2003. Other additions were Eric Abidal, Yaya Touré, and Gabriel Milito . On the other end, some important players that were often used last season have left the club, such as, Giovanni van Bronckhorst and Ludovic Giuly. Barcelona still used a great number of players developed in its youth system, 9 of 23, and have two new additions this season: Giovani dos Santos and Bojan (17 years old, the youngest player on the squad).

Most of the players have contracts beyond this end of season, but Deco, an important player, has his contract ending in 2008. The captain is still Carles Puyol, who is from Barcelona's youth system, plays in the first squad since 1999 and currently is the player with the most appearances (268). Currently, the highest scorer is Ronaldinho, with 80 goals. Also Ronaldinho, from August of this year, has a European passport. On mid-October, Samuel Eto'o received Spanish nationality, making him an EU player. The only non-EU player is Yaya Touré. Because Spain ratified the Cotonou Agreement in 2007, however, Touré is now considered an EU player, as his native country of Ivory Coast is a signatory to that agreement, and the 2003 Kolpak ruling extended the Bosman ruling to nations with an associate trading relationship with the EU.

As of 21 October

N	Pos.	Nat.	Name	Age	EU	Since	App	Goals	Ends	Transfer fee	Notes
1	GK	(Spain)	Víctor Valdés (VC3)	26	EU	2002	210	0	2010	Youth system	
3	CB	(Argentina)	Gabriel Milito	27	EU	2007	39	1	2011	€17M	
4	CB	(Mexico)	Rafael Márquez	29	EU	2003	166	8	2010	€5M	
5	CB	(Spain)	Carles Puyol (captain)	30	EU	1999	303	6	2010	Youth system	
6	CM	(Spain)	Xavi (VC2)	28	EU	1998	288	28	2010	Youth system	
7	CF	(Iceland)	Eiður Guðjohnsen	29	EU	2006	72	13	2009	€12M	
8	CM	(Spain)	Andrés Iniesta	24	EU	2002	211	17	2010	Youth system	
9	CF	(Cameroon)	Samuel Eto'o	27	EU	2004	137	89	2010	€24M	
10	LW	(Brazil)	Ronaldinho (VC1)	28	EU	2003	196	89	2010	€30M	EU passport
11	RB	(Italy)	Gianluca Zambrotta	31	EU	2006	74	3	2010	€14M	
13	GK	(Spain)	José Manuel Pinto	32	EU	2008	0	0	2008	loan	
14	LW	(France)	Thierry Henry	30	EU	2007	40	14	2011	€24M	
15	DM	(Brazil)	Edmílson	31	EU	2004	89	0	2008	€10M	
16	LB	(Brazil)	Sylvinho	34	EU	2004	92	3	2008	€2M	
17	FW	(Mexico)	Giovani dos Santos	19	EU	2007	33	1	2009	Youth system	EU passport
18	CF	(Spain)	Santiago Ezquerro	31	EU	2005	38	7	2008	Free	
19	RW	(Argentina)	Lionel Messi	20	EU	2004	97	40	2014	Youth system	
20	LM	(Portugal)	Deco	30	EU	2004	151	19	2008	€15M	€15M + Quaresma
21	CB	(France)	Lilian Thuram	36	EU	2006	50	0	2008	€5M	
22	LB	(France)	Eric Abidal	28	EU	2007	40	0	2011	€15M	
23	CB	(Spain)	Oleguer	28	EU	2002	165	1	2010	Youth system	
24	DM	(Ivory Coast)	Touré Yaya	25	Non-EU	2007	32	2	2011	€9M	Under Kolpak ruling
25	GK	(Spain)	Albert Jorquera	29	EU	2001	17	0	2008	Youth system	
27	FW	(Spain)	Bojan	17	EU	2007	40	10	2009	Youth system	

- Last updated: 12 April
- Source: FCBarcelona.cat, Players transfer, Wikipedia players' articles, ESPN (for appearances and goals) and footballdatabase.com (for EU passport)
  Allowed up to 3 players without EU passport.
- Ordered by start team and position on pitch (from back right to front left).

=== Transfers ===
==== In ====
No.	Pos.	Nat.	Name	Age	EU	Moving from	Type	Transfer window	Ends	Transfer fee	Source
14	FW	(France)	Henry	29	EU	Arsenal (England)	Transfer ✓	Summer	2011	€24M	FCBarcelona.cat
24	MF	(Ivory Coast)	Touré Yaya	24	Non-EU	Monaco (France)	Transfer ✓	Summer	2011	€9M	FCBarcelona.cat; FCBarcelona.cat
22	DF	(France)	Abidal	27	EU	Lyon (France)	Transfer ✓	Summer	2011	€15M	FCBarcelona.cat
12	DF	(Argentina)	Milito	26	EU	Zaragoza	Transfer ✓	Summer	2011	€17M + €3.5M in variables	FCBarcelona.cat
17	FW	(Mexico)	Giovani	18	EU	Barcelona B	Promote	Summer	2009	Youth system	FCBarcelona.cat
27	FW	(Spain)	Bojan	16	EU	Barcelona B	Promote	Summer	2009	Youth system	FCBarcelona.cat
13	GK	(Spain)	Pinto	31	EU	Celta de Vigo	Loan →	Winter	2008	€0.5M	FCBarcelona.cat; FCBarcelona.cat

Total spending: ▼€65.5 million

==== Out ====
No.	Pos.	Nat.	Name	Age	EU	Moving to	Type	Transfer window	Transfer fee	Source
12	DF	(Netherlands)	Bronckhorst	32	EU	Feyenoord (Netherlands)	Contract Termination ✗	Summer	Free	
22	FW	(Argentina)	Saviola	25	EU	Real Madrid	Contract Termination ✗	Summer	Free	RealMadrid.com
8	FW	(France)	Giuly	30	EU	Roma (Italy)	Transfer ✓	Summer	€3.2M	FCBarcelona.cat
28	GK	(Spain)	Rubén	23	EU	Racing Ferrol	Loan →	Summer	N/A	lavozdegalicia.es
	FW	(Argentina)	Maxi López	23	EU	FC Moscow (Russia)	Transfer ✓	Summer	€2M	Marca.com
2	RB	(Brazil)	Belletti	31	EU	Chelsea (England)	Transfer ✓	Summer	€5.5M	chelseafc.com
3	MF	(Brazil)	Thiago Motta	24	EU	Atlético Madrid	Transfer ✓	Summer	€1M + 2M in variables	FCBarcelona.cat

Last updated: 1 February
EU = if holds or not a European Union passport; Country: when 2 flags, 1st flag = country that plays for internationally, 2nd flag = country of birth; N = number on jersey; P = Position (for position name, pause mouse pointer on abbreviation); Name = Name on jersey (for more extensive name, pause mouse pointer on name); Age = age on the day of the signing; Moving from = only indicate the club the player was playing before start playing for this club in this season, for the type of the moving see Status column; Moving to = only indicates the club the player is going to play next, for the type of the moving see Status column; Ends = when the player's current contract ends; n/a = Not applicable.

Total income: ▲€11.7 million.

Expenditure: ▼€53.8 million.

=== Squad stats ===
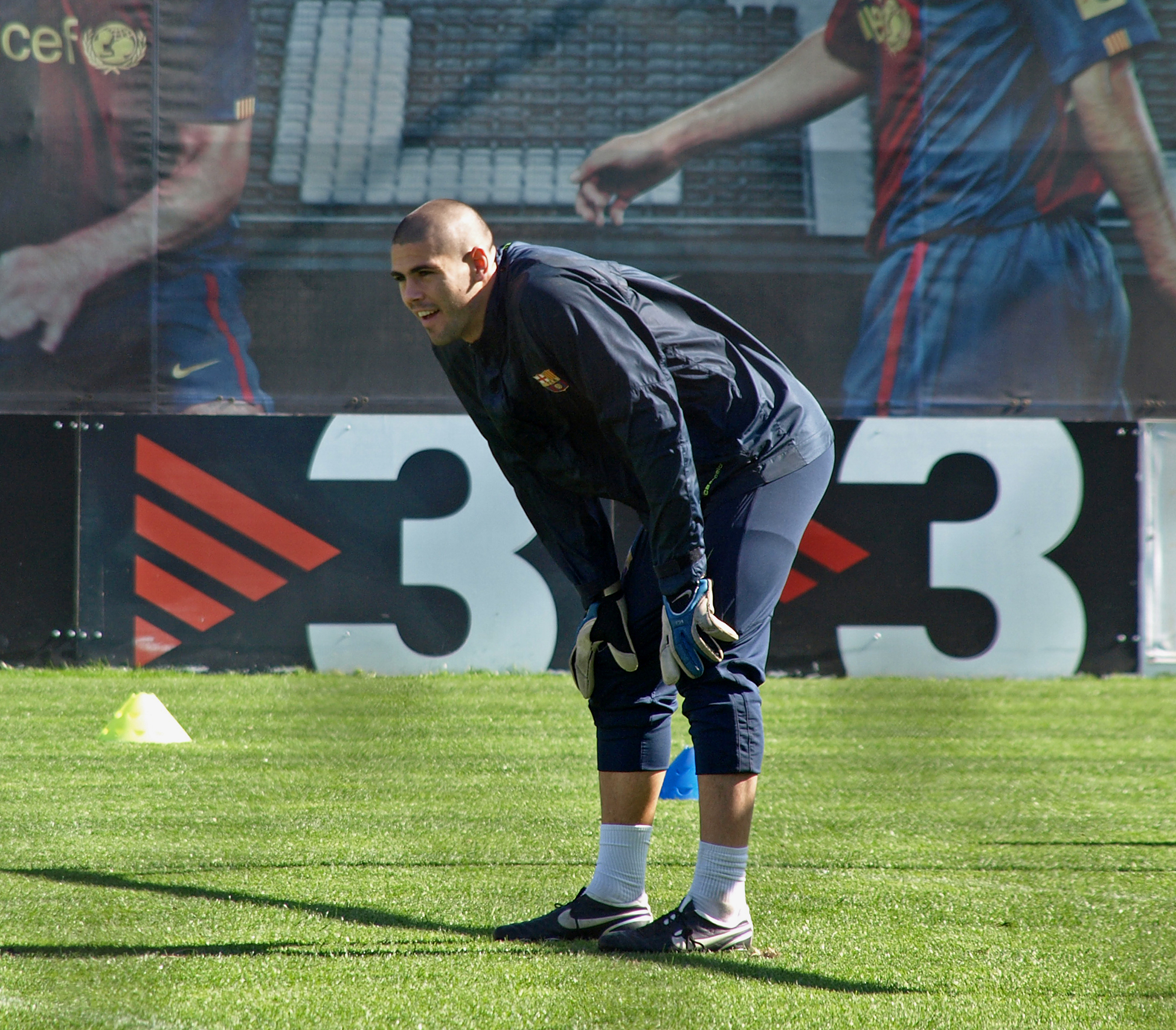
Víctor Valdés has the most starts in this season.

Víctor Valdés and Eric Abidal have been the only two players that have started all the matches (excepting Copa Catalunya, when Barcelona didn't use the same players as for the other competitions). Previously, Gianluca Zambrotta and Yaya Touré started all the matches until they got injured. Oleguer replaced Zambrotta and Andrés Iniesta replaced Touré. Giovani dos Santos and Bojan were the substitute forwards, while Santiago Ezquerro played only in the Copa Catalunya, as well as Eiður Guðjohnsen playing once. Thierry Henry started the majority of the matches when Samuel Eto'o got injured. He scored his first hat trick wearing Barça's jersey, and he's the second goal scorer with four goals. Ronaldinho missed three matches due to an injury.

As of 5 February

				Total			La Liga		UEFA Champions League		Copa del Rey		Copa Catalunya	
No.	Pos.	Nat.	Name	Sts	App	Gls	App	Gls	App	Gls	App	Gls	App	Gls
1	GK	(Spain)	V. Valdés	52	52		35		11		6			
11	RB/LB	(Italy)	Zambrotta	37	41		29		7		5			
3	CB	(Argentina)	Milito	41	42	1	27	1	9		6			
5	CB/RB	(Spain)	Puyol	45	47	1	30		10	1	7			
22	LB/CB	(France)	Abidal	43	46		30		10		6			
24	DM	(Ivory Coast)	Touré Yaya (Note: Played in 2008 African Cup of Nations)	37	38	2	26	1	9	1	3			
6	RM/DM/LM	(Spain)	Xavi	50	54	9	35	7	12	1	7	1		
8	MF/LW/DM/RM	(Spain)	A. Iniesta	43	49	4	31	3	11	1	7			
19	RW	(Argentina)	Messi	34	40	16	28	10	9	6	3			
9	CF	(Cameroon)	Eto'o	27	28	18	18	16	7	1	3	1		
14	LW/CF	(France)	Henry	40	47	19	30	12	10	3	7	4		
10	LW/CF	(Brazil)	Ronaldinho	20	26	9	17	8	8	1	1			
7	FW/LM/RM	(Iceland)	Guðjohnsen	19	37	3	23	2	8		6	1		
4	CB/DM	(Mexico)	Márquez	26	37	2	23	2	8		5		1	
13	GK	(Spain)	Pinto	3	3		3							
15	DM	(Brazil)	Edmílson	7	15		11		1		3			
16	LB	(Brazil)	Sylvinho	17	24	1	14		4		4		2	1
17	FW	(Mexico)	Giovani	16	38	4	28	3	5	1	5			
18	FW	(Spain)	Ezquerro	4	6	3	3				1	2	2	1
20	LM	(Portugal) (Brazil)	Deco	24	29	1	18	1	6		5			
21	CB	(France)	Thuram	25	28		18		6		4			
23	CB/RB	(Spain)	Oleguer	11	17		12		2		1		2	
25	GK	(Spain)	Jorquera	4	4				1		1		2	
26	MF	(Spain)	Crosas	2	5				1		2		2	
27	FW	(Spain)	Bojan	20	48	12	31	10	9	1	8	1		
28	GK	(Spain)	Oier	1	1						1			
30	DM	(Spain)	Víctor Sánchez	1	2		1				1			
31	CB	(Spain)	Valiente		1						1			
33	RW	(Spain)	Pedro		3		2						1	
36	MF	(Spain)	Víctor Vázquez	1	3	1	1						2	1
37	DF	(Spain)	Fali		2		1						1	
38	MF	(Spain)	Rueda		1		1							

Last updated: 17 May
Source: FCBarcelona.cat
Ordered by start team and position on pitch (from back right to front left)
0 shown as blank

=== Disciplinary record ===
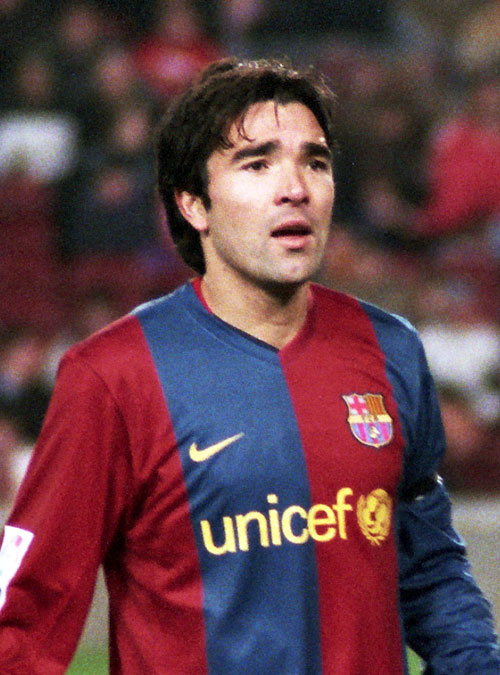
Deco, the most booked player.

N	Pos.	Nat.	Name	Yellow card	Second yellow card	Red card	Notes
11	RB	(Italy)	Zambrotta	7	0	1	
4	CB	(Mexico)	Márquez	9	1	0	
3	CB	(Argentina)	Milito	9	1	0	
20	LM	(Portugal) (Brazil)	Deco	12	0	0	24 appearances, booked every other match.
5	CB	(Spain)	Puyol	11	0	0	
24	CM	(Ivory Coast)	Touré Yaya	8	0	0	
17	FW	(Mexico)	Giovani	6	0	0	
8	MF	(Spain)	A. Iniesta	5	0	0	
19	RW	(Argentina)	Messi	5	0	0	
22	LB	(France)	Abidal	4	0	0	
9	FW	(Cameroon)	Eto'o	3	0	0	
7	CF	(Iceland)	Guðjohnsen	3	0	0	
14	CF	(France)	Henry	3	0	0	
6	RM	(Spain)	Xavi	3	1	0	
27	FW	(Spain)	Bojan	2	0	0	
21	CB	(France)	Thuram	2	0	0	
23	CB	(Spain)	Oleguer	1	0	0	
16	LB	(Brazil)	Sylvinho	1	0	0	
1	GK	(Spain)	V. Valdés	1	0	0	

Last updated: 12 April
Source: FCBarcelona.cat
Only competitive matches
(yellow card) = Number of bookings; (second yellow card) = Number of sending offs after a second yellow card; (red card) = Number of sending offs by a direct red card.

== Club ==
=== Coaching staff ===
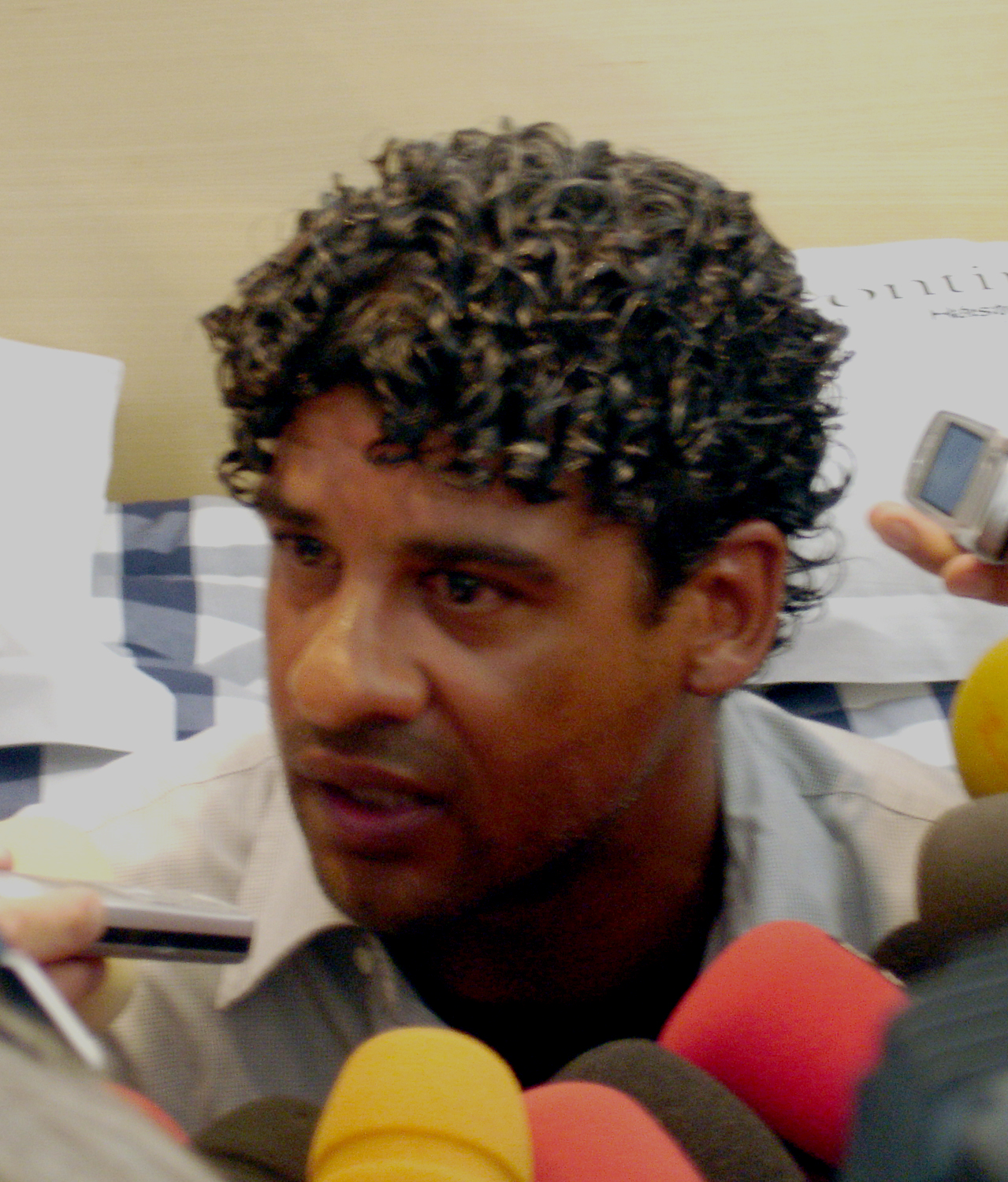
Frank Rijkaard, managing Barcelona since 2003.

This season will be the fifth consecutive season for Frank Rijkaard as Barcelona's manager. Even though Barça did not win any major competition last season, club president Joan Laporta confirmed Rijkaard's presence for this season. All staff from last season, except doctor Gil Rodas, are remaining.

As of 13 October

Position	Staff
Head coach	(Netherlands) Frank Rijkaard
Assistant coach	(Netherlands) Johan Neeskens / (Spain) Eusebio Sacristán
Goalkeeping coach	(Spain) Juan Carlos Unzué
Fitness coach	Paco Seirul·lo / Albert Roca
Doctors	Ricard Pruna / Toni Tramullas
Representative	Carles Naval

Last updated: 19 September
Source: FCBarcelona.cat

=== Kit ===
Supplier: Nike
Features: UNICEF (a noncommercial agreement, see FCBarcelona.cat)

Home	Away	Third

Source: FCBarcelona.cat
Notes: Socks have stripes not shown here.

=== Other information ===
President	(Spain) Joan Laporta
Vice-president and sports affairs	(Spain) Marc Ingla
Technical secretary	(Spain) Txiki Beguiristáin
Vice-president and institutional relations	(Spain) Albert Vicens
Vice-president and economical affairs	(Spain) Ferran Soriano
Vice-president and marketing-media	(Spain) Jaume Ferrer
Security affairs	(Spain) Alfonso Castro
Ground (capacity and dimensions)	Camp Nou (98.772 / 105x68m)
Budget	€315m

Updated to match played 11 January
Source: FC Barcelona Board Members and Budget

== Competitions ==
=== La Liga ===
==== Classification ====
Pos	Team	Pld	W	D	L	GF	GA	GD	Pts	Qualification or relegation
1	Real Madrid (C)	38	27	4	7	84	36	+48	85	Qualification for the Champions League group stage
2	Villarreal	38	24	5	9	63	40	+23	77	Qualification for the Champions League group stage
3	Barcelona	38	19	10	9	76	43	+33	67	Qualification for the Champions League third qualifying round
4	Atlético Madrid	38	19	7	12	66	47	+19	64 (Note: ATM 4–3 SEV; SEV 1–2 ATM)	Qualification for the Champions League third qualifying round
5	Sevilla	38	20	4	14	75	49	+26	64	Qualification for the UEFA Cup first round

Source: LFP
Rules for classification: 1st points; 2nd head-to-head points; 3rd head-to-head goal difference; 4th head-to-head goals scored; 5th goal difference; 6th number of goals scored; 7th Fair-play points
(C) Champions

==== Results by round ====
Round	1	2	3	4	5	6	7	8	9	10	11	12	13	14	15	16	17	18	19	20	21	22	23	24	25	26	27	28	29	30	31	32	33	34	35	36	37	38
Ground	A	H	A	H	H	A	H	A	H	A	H	A	H	A	H	A	H	A	H	H	A	H	A	A	H	A	H	A	H	A	H	A	H	A	H	A	H	A
Result	D	W	D	W	W	W	W	L	W	D	W	L	W	D	W	W	L	W	W	W	D	W	D	W	W	L	L	D	W	L	D	D	D	L	W	L	L	W
Position	12	3	5	4	4	4	2	4	2	2	2	3	3	2	2	2	2	2	2	2	2	2	2	2	2	2	2	2	2	3	2	2	3	3	3	3	3	3

Source: Competitive Matches
A = Away; H = Home; W = Win; D = Draw; L = Loss

=== UEFA Champions League ===
Pos	Team	Pld	W	D	L	GF	GA	GD	Pts	Qualification	BAR	LYO	RAN	STU
1	(Spain) Barcelona	6	4	2	0	12	3	+9	14	Advance to knockout stage	—	3–0	2–0	3–1
2	(France) Lyon	6	3	1	2	11	10	+1	10	Advance to knockout stage	2–2	—	0–3	4–2
3	(Scotland) Rangers	6	2	1	3	7	9	−2	7	Transfer to UEFA Cup	0–0	0–3	—	2–1
4	(Germany) VfB Stuttgart	6	1	0	5	7	15	−8	3		0–2	0–2	3–2	—

Source: RSSSF

== Matches ==
=== Competitive ===
Game	Date	Tournament	Round	Ground	Opponent	Score^{1}	Report
1	26 August	La Liga	1	A	Racing Santander	0–0	Report / [ Report link]; Kick off / 19:00 CEST; Barcelona / Racing Santander; (yellow card) 90' Oleguer / (yellow card) 13' Fernández; (red card) 68' Smolarek
2	2 September	La Liga	2	H	Athletic Bilbao	3–1	Report / [ Report link]; Kick off / 19:00 CEST; Attendance / 76,817; Referee / Megía Dávila; Barcelona / Athletic Bilbao; 8' Ronaldinho; (yellow card) 25' Deco; 34' Ronaldinho; (yellow card) 62' (yellow-red card) 77' Márquez; 72' Touré / (yellow card) 34' Gorka; (yellow card) 45', (goal) 71' Susaeta; (red card) 80' Koikili
3	5 September	Copa Catalunya	Semi-final	N	Girona	3–2	Report / [ Report link]; Kick off / 21:45 CEST; Referee / Pérez Fuentes; Barcelona / Girona; (yellow card) 25' Córcoles; 66' (o.g.) Migue; 70' Ezquerro; 73' Sylvinho / (yellow card) 26' Asensio; (yellow card) 41' Matamala; 61' Chechu; 65' Uri; (yellow card) 69' Xumetra
4	11 September	Copa Catalunya	Final	N	Gimnàstic	1–2	Report / [ Report link]; Kick off / 21:45 CEST; Referee / Álvarez Izquierdo; Barcelona / Gimnàstic; 66' Vázquez; (yellow card) 70' Fali / 55' Pinilla; 79' Maldonado
5	16 September	La Liga	3	A	Osasuna	0–0	Report / [ Report link]; Kick off / 21:00 CEST; Referee / Miguel Angel Pérez Lasa; Barcelona / Osasuna; (yellow card) 31' Deco; (yellow card) 38' Iniesta / (yellow card) 27' Josetxo; (yellow card) 39' Izquierdo
6	19 September	UEFA Champions League	Group Stage	H	Lyon (France)	3 – 0	21' (o.g.) Clerc; (yellow card) 33' Touré; (yellow card) 71' Henry; 82' Messi; 90+1' Henry
7	22 September	La Liga	4	H	Sevilla	2 – 1	(yellow card) 20' Zambrotta; 73' Messi; 77' (pen.) Messi; (yellow card) 82' Touré; (yellow card) 87' Deco
8	26 September	La Liga	5	H	Zaragoza	4 – 1	5' Messi; 11' Messi; 21' Iniesta; 45+1' Márquez; (yellow card) 49' Touré; (yellow card) 58' Márquez
9	29 September	La Liga	6	A	Levante	4 – 1	17' Henry; 24' Henry; 49' Henry; 51' Messi
10	2 October	UEFA Champions League	Group Stage	A (Germany)	VfB Stuttgart (Germany)	2 – 0	(yellow card) 41' Messi; 53' Puyol; 67' Messi
11	7 October	La Liga	7	H	Atlético Madrid	3–0	Report / [ Report link]; Kick off / 17:00 CEST; Attendance / 89.876; Barcelona / Atlético Madrid; 16', (yellow card) 61' Deco; 20' Messi; 89' Xavi / (yellow card) 13' Pernía; (yellow card) 72' García; (yellow card) 75' Ibáñez; (yellow card) 79' Seitaridis
12	20 October	La Liga	8	A	Villarreal	1–3	Report / [ Report link]; Kick off / 17:00 CEST; Barcelona / Villarreal; 24' Bojan; (yellow card) 33' Milito; (yellow card) 63' Deco; (yellow card) 72' Xavi / 2' Cazorla; 13' (pen.), 34' (pen.) Senna; (yellow card) 53' Capdevila
13	23 October	UEFA Champions League	Group stage	A (Scotland)	Rangers (Scotland)	0–0	Report / [ Report link]; Kick off / 20:45 BST; Attendance / 49.957; Barcelona / Rangers; (yellow card) 48' Milito; (yellow card) 63' Abidal / (yellow card) 36' Thomson; (yellow card) 50' Papac; (yellow card) 71' Weir
14	28 October	La Liga	9	H	Almería	2–0	Report / [ Report link]; Kick off / 19:00 CEST; Barcelona / Almería; (yellow card) 6' Milito; 37' Henry; 79' (pen.) Messi; (yellow card) 90+1' Abidal / (yellow card) 1' Juanito
15	1 November	La Liga	10	A	Valladolid	1–1	Report / [ Report link]; Kick off / 22:00 CEST; Barcelona / Valladolid; 42' Ronaldinho / 15', (yellow card) 15' Llorente
16	4 November	La Liga	11	H	Betis	3 – 0	
17	7 November	UEFA Champions League	Group Stage	H	Rangers (Scotland)	2 – 0	
18	10 November	La Liga	12	A	Getafe	0–2	Report / [ Report link]; Kick off / 20:00 CEST; Barcelona / Getafe; (yellow card) 21' Touré; (yellow card) 26' Puyol; (yellow card) 57' Iniesta; (yellow card) 75' Bojan; (red card) 86' Zambrotta / 27' Manu; (yellow card) 68' Mario; (yellow card) 76' Granero; 90' Albín
19	13 November	Copa del Rey	Round of 32	A	Alcoyano	3 – 0	
20	24 November	La Liga	13	H	Recreativo	3 – 0	
21	27 November	UEFA Champions League	Group Stage	A (France)	Lyon (France)	2 – 2	
22	1 December	La Liga	14	A	Espanyol	1 – 1	
23	9 December	La Liga	15	H	Deportivo La Coruña	2 – 1	
24	12 December	UEFA Champions League	Group Stage	H	VfB Stuttgart (Germany)	3 – 1	
25	15 December	La Liga	16	A	Valencia	3 – 0	
26	23 December	La Liga	17	H	Real Madrid	0–1	Report / [ Report link]; Kick off / 19.00 CET; Attendance / 98,247; Referee / Mejuto González; Barcelona / Real Madrid; (yellow card) 27' Puyol; (yellow card) 68' Milito / 35', (yellow card) 84' Baptista; (yellow card) 45+2' Ramos
27	2 January	Copa del Rey	Round of 32	H	Alcoyano	2 – 2	
28	6 January	La Liga	18	A	Mallorca	2 – 0	
29	9 January	Copa del Rey	Round of 16	A	Sevilla	1 – 1	
30	13 January	La Liga	19	H	Murcia	4 – 0	
31	15 January	Copa del Rey	Round of 16	H	Sevilla	0 – 0	
32	20 January	La Liga	20	H	Racing Santander	1 – 0	
33	24 January	Copa del Rey	Quarter-finals	A	Villarreal	0–0	Report / Report link; Kick off / 22:00 CET
34	27 January	La Liga	21	A	Athletic Bilbao	1 – 1	
35	31 January	Copa del Rey	Quarter-finals	H	Villarreal	1–0	Report / Report link; Kick off / 22:00 CET
36	3 February	La Liga	22	H	Osasuna	1 – 0	
37	10 February	La Liga	23	A	Sevilla	1 – 1	
38	17 February	La Liga	24	A	Zaragoza	2 – 1	
39	20 February	UEFA Champions League	Round of 16	A (Scotland)	Celtic (Scotland)	3 – 2	
40	24 February	La Liga	25	H	Levante	5 – 1	
41	27 February	Copa del Rey	Semi-finals	H	Valencia	1 – 1	
42	2 March	La Liga	26	A	Atlético Madrid	2 – 4	
43	4 March	UEFA Champions League	Round of 16	H	Celtic (Scotland)	1 – 0	
44	9 March	La Liga	27	H	Villarreal	1–2	Report / [ Report link]; Kick off / 21:00 CET; Attendance / 52,827; Referee / Alfonso Pérez Burrull; Barcelona / Villarreal; (yellow card) 30' Valdés; (yellow card) 37' Thuram; 66', (yellow card) 74' Xavi; (yellow card) 70' Eto'o; (yellow card) 86' Zambrotta / (yellow card) 17' Cazorla; 31' Senna; (yellow card) 45' Franco; (yellow card) 73' Capdevila; (yellow card) 74' Godín; 80' Tomasson
45	16 March	La Liga	28	A	Almería	2–2	Report / [ Report link]; Kick off / 19:00 CET; Referee / Antonio Rubinos Pérez; Barcelona / Almería; 17' Bojan; (yellow card) 30' Puyol; 56' Eto'o; (yellow card) 57' (yellow-red card) 71' Milito; (yellow card) 59' Iniesta; (yellow card) 67' Guðjohnsen / 32' Pulido; 85' Uche
46	20 March	Copa del Rey	Semi-finals	A	Valencia	2–3	Report / [ Report link]; Kick off / 20:45 CET; Referee / Mejuto González; Barcelona / Valencia; (yellow card) 48' Guðjohnsen; 72' Henry; (yellow card) 74' Sylvinho; 80' Eto'o / 18', (yellow card) 37' Baraja; 45', 73' Mata
47	23 March	La Liga	29	H	Valladolid	4–1	Report / [ Report link]; Kick off / 17:00 CET; Attendance / 56,737; Referee / Jose Luís P. Romero; Barcelona / Valladolid; 23' Eto'o; (yellow card) 30' Thuram; 47' Iniesta; (yellow card) 50' Puyol; 62', 83' Bojan / 30' (pen.) Sesma; (yellow card) 70' Camacho
48	30 March	La Liga	30	A	Betis	2–3	Report / [ Report link]; Kick off / 20:00 CEST; Referee / Javier Turienzo Álvarez; Barcelona / Betis; 13' Bojan; 15' Eto'o / (yellow card) 9' González; (yellow card) 51' Damià; 63' Edú; 76' Juanito; 78' Edú
49	1 April	UEFA Champions League	Quarter-finals	A (Germany)	Schalke 04 (Germany)	1–0	Report / [ Report link]; Kick off / 20:45 CEST; Attendance / 53,951; Referee / Kyros Vassaras (Greece); Barcelona / Schalke 04; 11' Bojan; (yellow card) 67' Milito; (yellow card) 90+2' Dos Santos; (yellow card) 90+3' Márquez; (yellow card) 90+4' Puyol / (yellow card) 83' Pander; (yellow card) 84' Larsen; (yellow card) 86' Ernst; (yellow card) 93' Krstajić
50	6 April	La Liga	31	H	Getafe	0–0	Report / [ Report link]; Kick off / 21:00 CEST; Attendance / 59,523; Referee / Fernando Teixeira Vitienes; Barcelona / Getafe; (yellow card) 24' Touré; (yellow card) 58' Zambrotta / (yellow card) 12' Celestini
51	9 April	UEFA Champions League	Quarter-finals	H	Schalke 04 (Germany)	1–0	Report / [ Report link]; Kick off / 20:45 CEST; Attendance / 72,113; Referee / Roberto Rosetti (Italy); Barcelona / Schalke 04; 43' Touré / (yellow card) 10' Rafinha; (yellow card) 26' Westermann; (yellow card) 26' Ernst; (yellow card) 64' Asamoah
52	12 April	La Liga	32	A	Recreativo	2–2	Report / [ Report link]; Kick off / 22:00 CEST; Referee / Carlos Clos Gómez; Barcelona / Recreativo; 1', 46' Eto'o; (yellow card) 82' Zambrotta / (yellow card) 21' Álvarez; 41', 70' Rubén; (yellow card) 66' Poli
53	19 April	La Liga	33	H	Espanyol	0–0	Report / [ Report link]; Kick off / 20:00 CEST; Attendance / 74,451; Referee / Miguel Angel Pérez Lasa; Barcelona / Espanyol; (yellow card) 41' Guðjohnsen; (yellow card) 65' Puyol; (yellow card) 82' Iniesta; (yellow card) 90+1' Milito; (yellow card) 90+2' Messi; (yellow card) 90+3' Xavi / (yellow card) 15' Hurtado; (yellow card) 43' Rufete; (yellow card) 61' Ángel; (yellow card) 65' Jarque; (yellow card) 65' Chica; (yellow card) 76' Tamudo; (yellow card) 87' Kameni
54	23 April	UEFA Champions League	Semi-finals	H	Manchester United (England)	0–0	Report / [ Report link]; Kick off / 20:45 CEST; Attendance / 95.949; Referee / Massimo Busacca (Switzerland); Barcelona / Manchester United; (yellow card) 44' Márquez / (yellow card) 72' Hargreaves
55	26 April	La Liga	34	A	Deportivo La Coruña	0–2	Report / [ Report link]; Kick off / 20:00 CEST; Referee / Carlos Delgado Ferreiro; Barcelona / Deportivo La Coruña; (yellow card) 62' Sylvinho; (yellow card) 84' Márquez; (yellow card) 87' Edmílson; (yellow card) 88' Deco / 54' Rodríguez; 76' Amo; (yellow card) 80' Lafita
56	29 April	UEFA Champions League	Semi-finals	A (England)	Manchester United (England)	0–1	Report / [ Report link]; Kick off / 19:45 WEST; Attendance / 61.250; Referee / Herbert Fandel (Germany); Barcelona / Manchester United; (yellow card) 52' Zambrotta; (yellow card) 53' Deco; (yellow card) 70' Touré / 14' Scholes; (yellow card) Ronaldo
57	4 May	La Liga	35	H	Valencia	6–0	Report / [ Report link]; Kick off / 19:00 CEST; Attendance / 54.905; Referee / Undiano Mallenco; Barcelona / Valencia; 5' Messi; 8' Xavi; 14', 58' Henry; (yellow card) 25' Deco; (yellow card) 38' Márquez; (yellow card) 47' Eto'o; 72', 79' Bojan / (yellow card) 4' Alexis; (yellow card) 35' Baraja; (yellow card) 50' Marchena
58	7 May	La Liga	36	A	Real Madrid	1–4	Report / [ Report link]; Kick off / 22:00 CEST; Attendance / 80,000; Referee / Pérez Burrull; Barcelona / Real Madrid; (yellow card) 20' Touré; (yellow card) 39' Márquez; (yellow card) 50', (goal) 87' Henry; (yellow card) 58' Valdés; (yellow card) 76' (yellow-red card) 90+2' Xavi; (yellow card) 76' Edmílson / 13' Raúl; 21' Robben; (yellow card) 41' Sneijder; 64' Higuaín; 77' (pen.) Van Nistelrooy; (yellow card) 84' Heinze; (yellow card) 91' Pepe
59	11 May	La Liga	37	H	Mallorca	2–3	Report / [ Report link]; Kick off / 21:00 CEST; Attendance / 39,928; Referee / Antonio Rubinos Pérez; Barcelona / Mallorca; (yellow card) 62' (yellow-red card) 90+2' Edmílson; 17' Henry; (yellow card) 21' Thuram; 55' Eto'o / (yellow card) 8', (goal) 67' Valero; (yellow card) 18' Arango; 70' Webó; 90' Güiza
60	18 May	La Liga	38	A	Murcia	5–3	Report / [ Report link]; Kick off / CEST; Attendance / 33,000; Referee / Rafael Ramírez Domínguez; Murcia / Barcelona; (yellow card) 9' De Lucas; 16' Ochoa; (yellow card) 21' Marañón; 81' (pen.) Alonso; 85' Abel / 23' Eto'o; 25' Henry; 32', 52', 66' Dos Santos; (yellow card) 84' Fali

Last updated: 7 May
Source: FCBarcelona.cat
^{1}Barcelona goals come first.
National flags for Ground and Opponent columns are only shown when different from that of Barcelona.
M = Match; Ground: H = Home, A = Away, N = Neutral, HR = Home replacement, AR = Away replacement.

=== Friendly ===
Match	Date	Competition or tour	Ground	Opponent	Score^{1}	GD
1	26 July	Pre-season	A (Scotland)	Dundee United (Scotland)	1 - 0	1
2	28 July	Pre-season	N (Scotland)	Heart of Midlothian (Scotland)	3 - 1	2
3	5 August	Asian Tour	A (China)	Beijing Sinobo Guoan (China)	3 - 0	3
4	7 August	Asian Tour	A (Japan)	Yokohama Marinos (Japan)	1 - 0	1
5	11 August	Asian Tour	A (Hong Kong)	Mission Hills Invitation XI (Hong Kong)	4 - 0	4
6	15 August	Franz-Beckenbauer-Cup	A (Germany)	Bayern Munich (Germany)	1 - 0	1
7	29 August	Joan Gamper Trophy	H	Internazionale (Italy)	5 - 0	5

Last updated: 14 March
Source: FCBarcelona.cat
^{1}Barcelona goals come first.
Country's flag depict country of foreign team to that of Barcelona.
Ground: H = Home; A = Away; N = Neutral; HR = Home replacement; AR = Away replacement; GD = Goal difference

== See also ==
- FC Barcelona
- 2007–08 UEFA Champions League
- 2007–08 La Liga
- 2007–08 Copa del Rey
