= Thierry Henry =

French footballer (born 1977)

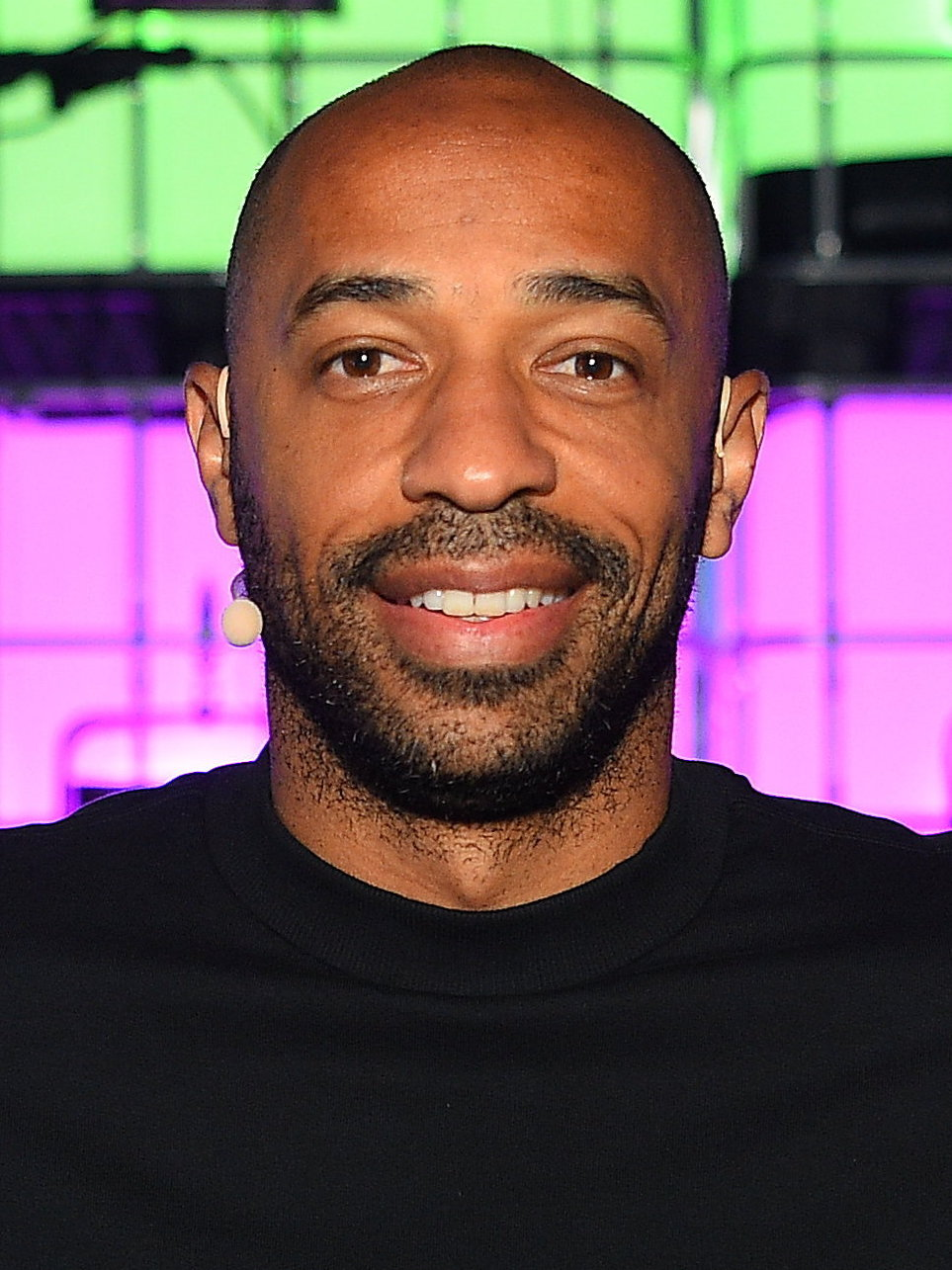
- Henry in 2021

Personal information
- Full name: Thierry Daniel Henry
- Date of birth: 17 August 1977 (age 49)
- Place of birth: Les Ulis, France
- Height: 1.88 m (6 ft 2 in)
- Position: Forward

Youth career
- 1983–1989: CO Les Ulis
- 1989–1990: US Palaiseau
- 1990–1992: Viry-Châtillon
- 1990–1992: INF Clairefontaine
- 1992–1994: Monaco

Senior career*
Years	Team	Apps	(Gls)
1994–1995	Monaco B	19	(6)
1994–1999	Monaco	105	(20)
1999	Juventus	16	(3)
1999–2007	Arsenal	254	(174)
2007–2010	Barcelona	80	(35)
2010–2014	New York Red Bulls	122	(51)
2012	→ Arsenal (loan)	4	(1)
Total		600	(290)

International career
1995–1996	France U18	14	(6)
1996–1999	France U21	15	(6)
1997	France U20	8	(4)
1997–2010	France	123	(51)
2000	France B	1	(0)

Managerial career
- 2018–2019: Monaco
- 2019–2021: Montreal Impact
- 2023–2024: France U21
- 2024: France Olympic
Medal record
Men's football
Representing France (as player)
FIFA World Cup
Winner	1998 France
Runner-up	2006 Germany
UEFA European Championship
Winner	2000 Belgium–Netherlands
FIFA Confederations Cup
Winner	2003 France
Representing France (as manager)
Olympic Games
Silver medal – second place	2024 Paris	Team
- * Club domestic league appearances and goals

Thierry Daniel Henry (Note: French pronunciation: [tjɛʁi danjɛl ɑ̃ʁi]) (born 17 August 1977) is a French professional football manager, pundit, and former player. Widely regarded as one of the greatest players in Premier League history, he was known for his speed, technical ability, composure, finesse shots and tactical intelligence.

Henry is a two-time winner of the European Golden Shoe. He was a runner-up for the Ballon d'Or in 2003 and for the FIFA World Player of the Year in 2003 and 2004. He was named the FWA Footballer of the Year a record three times, the PFA Players' Player of the Year twice, and made the PFA Team of the Year six consecutive times. He was included in the FIFA FIFPro World XI once and the UEFA Team of the Year five times. In 2004, Henry was named by Pelé in the FIFA 100 list of greatest living players.

Henry made his professional debut with Monaco in 1994 before signing for Juventus. Limited playing time, and disagreements with the club's hierarchy, led to him signing for Premier League club Arsenal for £11 million in 1999. Under long-time mentor and coach Arsène Wenger, Henry became a prolific striker and Arsenal's all-time leading scorer with 228 goals. Generally viewed as Arsenal's best ever player, he won the Premier League Golden Boot a record four times, three FA Cups and two Premier League titles, most notably as a cornerstone of the unbeaten Invincible season, after achieving a historic 24 goals and 20 assists the season prior. Henry spent his final two seasons with Arsenal as captain, leading them to their first UEFA Champions League final. Henry transferred to Barcelona in 2007 and concluded his debut season as the club's top scorer. In 2008–09, he was a key part of the club's historic treble when they won La Liga, the Copa del Rey, and UEFA Champions League. Henry had notably combined with Lionel Messi and Samuel Eto'o to become the most prolific trio in Spanish league history at the time, scoring 72 goals. In 2010, he joined Major League Soccer (MLS) club New York Red Bulls and returned to Arsenal on loan from January to February 2012, before retiring in 2014.

Henry had success with France, winning the 1998 FIFA World Cup, UEFA Euro 2000, and 2003 FIFA Confederations Cup. He was named French Player of the Year a record five times, named in the UEFA Euro 2000 Team of the Tournament, awarded the 2003 FIFA Confederations Cup Golden Ball and Golden Shoe, and named in the 2006 FIFA World Cup All-Star Team. In 2007, he became his country's record goalscorer, a record he held until 2022. After 123 appearances and 51 goals, Henry retired from international football after the 2010 FIFA World Cup.

Overall, he made over 1,000 appearances in his career.

After retiring, Henry transitioned into coaching. He began coaching Arsenal's youth teams in 2015, in tandem with punditry for Sky Sports. In 2016, he was appointed assistant coach at Belgium, before becoming Monaco head coach in 2018. He was relieved of his duties in 2019 and returned to MLS to manage Montréal Impact. He led Montréal to the playoffs in 2020 before departing in 2021, returning as an assistant coach for Belgium for 18 months. From August 2023 to August 2024, Henry served as manager of the France national under-21 team and the France Olympic team at the 2024 Summer Games, leading the team to silver.

== Early life ==
Henry is of Antillean heritage: his father, Antoine, is from Guadeloupe (La Désirade island), and his mother, Maryse, is from Martinique. He was born and raised in Les Ulis, a suburb of Paris that is sometimes seen as a tough neighbourhood despite its good footballing facilities. As a seven-year-old, Henry showed great potential, prompting Claude Chezelle to recruit him to the local club CO Les Ulis. His father pressured him to attend training although the youngster was not particularly drawn to football. He joined US Palaiseau in 1989, but his father fell out with the club after a year, so Henry moved to ES Viry-Châtillon and played there for two years. US Palaiseau coach Jean-Marie Panza, Henry's future mentor, followed him there.

== Club career ==
=== 1992–1999: Beginnings at Monaco and transfer to Juventus ===
In 1990, Monaco sent scout Arnold Catalano to watch Henry, then at the age of 13, in a match. Henry scored all six goals as his side won 6–0. Catalano asked him to join Monaco without even attending a trial first. Catalano requested that Henry complete a course at the elite INF Clairefontaine academy, and despite the director's reluctance to admit Henry due to his poor school results, he was allowed to complete the course and joined Arsène Wenger's Monaco as a youth player. Subsequently, Henry signed professional forms with Monaco, and made his professional debut on 31 August 1994, in a 2–0 loss against Nice. Although Wenger suspected that Henry should be deployed as a striker, he put Henry on the left wing because he believed that his pace, natural ball control and skill would be more effective against full backs than centre-backs.

After a tentative start to his Monaco career, Henry was named the French Young Footballer of the Year in 1996, and in the 1996–97 season, his solid performances helped the club win the Ligue 1 title. During the 1997–98 season, he was instrumental in leading his club to the UEFA Champions League semi-final, setting a French record, that was broken since, by scoring seven goals in the competition. By his third season, he had received his first cap for the national team, and was part of the winning team in the 1998 FIFA World Cup. He continued to impress at his tenure with Monaco, and in his five seasons with the club, the young winger scored 20 league goals in 105 appearances.

Henry left Monaco in January 1999, one year before his intimate and closest teammate David Trezeguet, and moved to Italian club Juventus for £10.5 million. He played on the wing, as well as at wing back and wide midfield, but he was ineffective as a goal scorer, struggling against the defensive discipline exhibited by teams in Serie A, registering just three goals in 16 appearances. In 2019, on Jamie Carragher's podcast The Greatest Game, Henry attributed disagreements with Juve director Luciano Moggi as his rationale behind departing the club.

=== 1999–2007: Move to Arsenal, breakthrough, and success ===
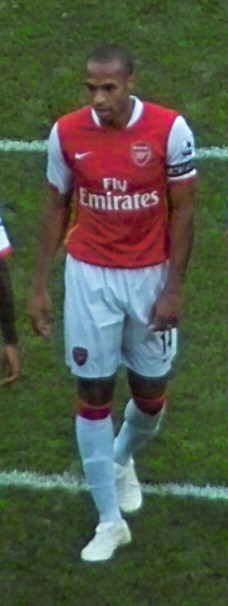
Henry was made captain following the departure of fellow Frenchman Patrick Vieira to Juventus in 2005.

Unsettled in Italy, Henry transferred from Juventus on 3 August 1999 to Arsenal for an estimated fee of £11 million, reuniting with his former manager Arsène Wenger. It was at Arsenal that Henry made his name as a world-class footballer, and although his transfer was not without controversy, Wenger was convinced he was worth the transfer fee. Brought in as a replacement for fellow French forward Nicolas Anelka, Henry was immediately moulded into a striker by Wenger, a move that would pay rich dividends in years to come. However, doubts were raised about his ability to adapt to the quick and physical English game when he failed to score in his first eight games. After several difficult months in England, Henry even conceded that he had to "be re-taught everything about the art of striking". These doubts were dispelled when he ended his first season at Arsenal with an impressive goal tally of 26. Arsenal finished second in the Premier League behind Manchester United, and lost in the UEFA Cup Final against Galatasaray.

Coming off the back of a victorious UEFA Euro 2000 campaign with the national team, Henry was ready to make an impact in the 2000–01 season. Despite recording fewer goals and assists than his first season, Henry's second season with Arsenal proved to be a breakthrough, as he became the club's top goalscorer. His goal tally included a spectacular strike against Manchester United where he flicked the ball up (with his back turned to goal), before he swivelled and volleyed in from 20 yards out. The strike also featured a memorable goal celebration where he recreated the Budweiser "Whassup?" advertisement. Armed with one of the league's best attacks, Arsenal finished runner-up to perennial rivals Manchester United in the Premier League. The team also reached the final of the FA Cup, losing 2–1 to Liverpool. Henry remained frustrated, however, by the fact that he had yet to help the club win honours, and frequently expressed his desire to establish Arsenal as a powerhouse.

Success finally arrived during the 2001–02 season.Arsenal finished seven points above Liverpool to win the Premier League title, and defeated Chelsea 2–0 in the FA Cup Final. Henry became the league's top goalscorer and netted 32 goals in all competitions as he led Arsenal to a double and his first silverware with the club. There was much expectation that Henry would replicate his club form for France during the 2002 FIFA World Cup, but the defending champions suffered a shock exit at the group stage.

2002–03 proved to be another productive season for Henry, as he scored 32 goals in all competitions while contributing 23 assists—remarkable returns for a striker. In doing so, he led Arsenal to another FA Cup triumph (where he was man-of-the-match in the Final), although Arsenal failed to retain their Premier League title. Throughout the season, he competed with Manchester United's Ruud van Nistelrooy for the league scoring title, but the Dutchman edged Henry to the Golden Boot by a single goal. Nonetheless, Henry was named both the PFA Players' Player of the Year and FWA Footballer of the Year. His rising status as one of the world's best footballers was affirmed when he emerged runner-up for the 2003 FIFA World Player of the Year award. With 24 goals and 20 assists in the league, Henry set a new record for most assists in a single Premier League season, and also became the first player in history to record at least 20 goals and 20 assists in a single season in one of Europe's top–five leagues—this feat has since been matched by Lionel Messi in 2020.

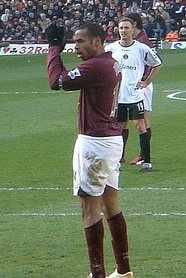
Henry in a Premier League game against Charlton Athletic at Highbury in March 2006

Entering the 2003–04 season, Arsenal were determined to reclaim the Premier League crown. Henry was again instrumental in Arsenal's exceptionally successful campaign; together with the likes of Dennis Bergkamp, Patrick Vieira, Freddie Ljungberg and Robert Pires, Henry ensured that the Gunners became the first team in more than a century to go through the entire domestic league season unbeaten, claiming the league title in the process. Apart from being named for the second year running as the PFA Players' Player of the Year and FWA Footballer of the Year, Henry emerged once again as the runner-up for 2004 FIFA World Player of the Year award. With 39 goals scored in all competitions, the Frenchman led the league in goals scored and won the European Golden Boot. However, as was the case in 2002, Henry was unable to lead the national side to honours during UEFA Euro 2004.

This dip in success was compounded when Arsenal failed again to secure back-to-back league titles when they lost out to Chelsea in the 2004–05 season, although Arsenal did win the FA Cup (the Final of which Henry missed through injury). Henry maintained his reputation as one of Europe's most feared strikers as he led the league in scoring, and with 31 goals in all competitions, he was the co-recipient (with Diego Forlán) of the European Golden Boot, becoming the first player to officially win the award twice in a row (Ally McCoist had won two Golden Boots in a row, but both were deemed unofficial). The unexpected departure of Arsenal's captain Patrick Vieira in the 2005 close season led to Henry being awarded club captaincy, a role which many felt was not naturally suited for him; the captaincy is more commonly given to defenders or midfielders, who are better-placed on the pitch to read the game. Along with being chief goalscorer, he was responsible for leading a very young team which had yet to gel fully.

The 2005–06 season proved to be one of remarkable personal achievements for Henry. On 17 October 2005, Henry became the club's top goalscorer of all time; two goals against Sparta Prague in the Champions League meant he broke Ian Wright's record of 185 goals. On 1 February 2006, he scored a goal against West Ham United, bringing his league goal tally up to 151, breaking Arsenal legend Cliff Bastin's league goals record. Henry scored his 100th league goal at Highbury, a feat unparalleled in the history of the club, and a unique achievement in the Premier League. On the final day of the Premier League season, Henry scored a hat-trick against Wigan Athletic in the last match played at Highbury. He completed the season as the league's top goalscorer, was voted the FWA Footballer of the Year for the third time in his career, and was selected in the FIFA World XI.

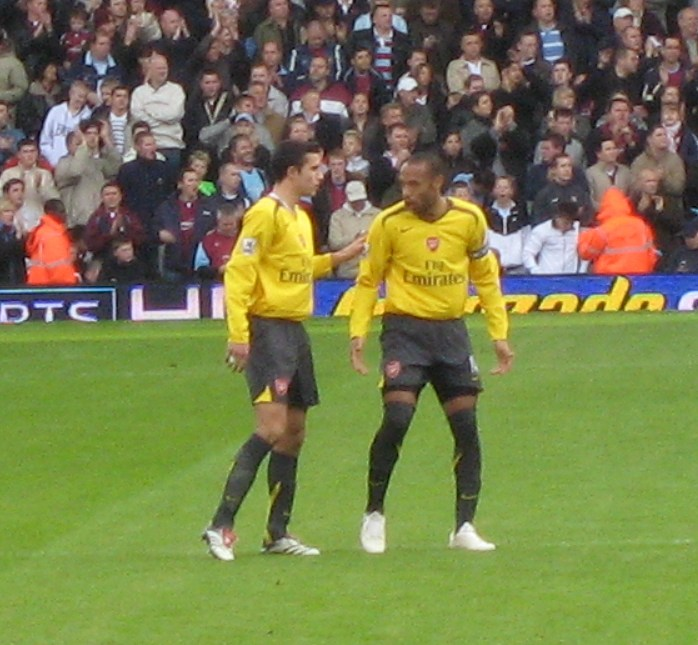
After the retirement of Dennis Bergkamp, Henry regularly partnered Robin van Persie in the Arsenal attack.

Nevertheless, Arsenal failed to win the Premier League title again, but hopes of a trophy were revived when Arsenal reached the 2006 UEFA Champions League Final. The Gunners eventually lost 2–1 to Barcelona, with Henry assisting the team's only goal from a free kick, and Arsenal's inability to win the league title for two consecutive seasons combined with the relative inexperience of the Arsenal squad caused much speculation that Henry would leave for another club. However, he declared his love for the club and accepted a four-year contract, and said he would stay at Arsenal for life. Arsenal vice-chairman David Dein later claimed the club had turned down two bids of £50 million from Spanish clubs for Henry before the signing of the new contract. Had the transfer materialised, it would have surpassed the then-world record £47 million paid for Zinedine Zidane.

Henry's 2006–07 season was marred by injuries. Although he scored 10 goals in 17 domestic appearances for Arsenal, Henry's season was cut short in February. Having missed games due to hamstring, foot, and back problems, he was deemed fit enough to come on as a late substitute against PSV in a Champions League match, but began limping shortly after coming on. Scans the next day revealed that he would need at least three months to heal from new groin and stomach injuries, missing the rest of the 2006–07 season. Wenger attributed Henry's injuries to a protracted 2005–06 campaign, and reiterated that Henry was keen on staying with the Gunners to rebuild for the 2007–08 season.

=== 2007–2010: Barcelona and a historic treble ===
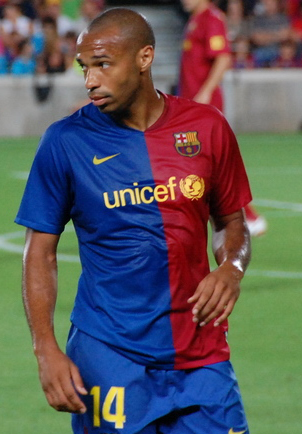
Henry playing for Barcelona in 2008

On 25 June 2007, in an unexpected turn of events, Henry was transferred to Barcelona for €24 million. He signed a four-year deal for a reported €6.8 (£4.6) million per season. It was revealed that the contract included a release clause of €125 (£84.9) million. Henry cited the departure of Dein and continued uncertainty over Wenger's future as reasons for leaving, and maintained that "I always said that if I ever left Arsenal it would be to play for Barcelona." Despite their captain's departure, Arsenal got off to an impressive start for the 2007–08 campaign, and Henry said that his presence in the team might have been more of a hindrance than a help. He stated, "Because of my seniority, the fact that I was captain and my habit of screaming for the ball, they would sometimes give it to me even when I was not in the best position. So in that sense it was good for the team that I moved on." Henry left Arsenal as the club's leading all-time league goalscorer with 174 goals and leading all-time goalscorer in European competitions with 42 goals; in July 2008, Arsenal fans voted him as Arsenal's greatest player ever in Arsenal.com's Gunners' Greatest 50 Players poll.

At Barcelona, Henry was given the number 14 jersey, the same as he had worn at Arsenal. He scored his first goal for his new club on 19 September 2007 in a 3–0 Champions League group stage win over Lyon, and he recorded his first hat-trick for Barça in a Primera División match against Levante ten days later. But with Henry mostly deployed on the wing throughout the season, he was unable to reproduce the goal-scoring form he achieved with Arsenal. He expressed dissatisfaction with the move to Barcelona in the initial year, amidst widespread speculation of a return to the Premier League. In an interview with Garth Crooks on BBC's Football Focus, Henry described missing life "back home" and even "the English press". However, Henry concluded his debut season as the club's top scorer with 19 goals in addition to nine league assists, second behind Lionel Messi's ten.

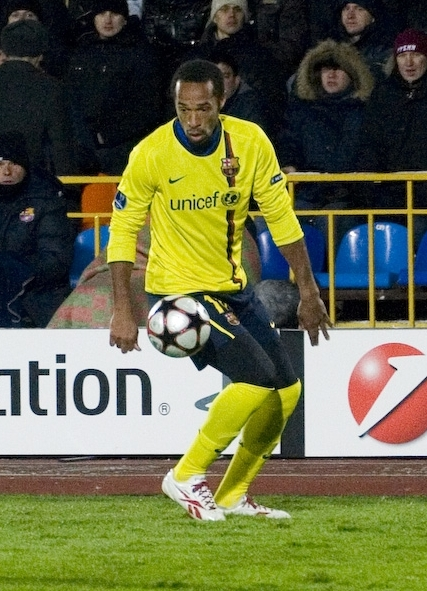
Henry playing for Barcelona in a UEFA Champions League game during the 2009–10 season

Henry went on to surpass this tally in a more integrated 2008–09 campaign, with 26 goals and 10 assists from the left wing. He won the first trophy of his Barcelona career on 13 May 2009 when Barcelona defeated Athletic Bilbao in the Copa del Rey final. Barcelona won the Primera División and UEFA Champions League soon after, completing a treble for the Frenchman, who had combined with Messi and Samuel Eto'o to score 100 goals between them that season. The trio was also the most prolific trio in Spanish league history, scoring 72 goals and surpassing the 66 goals of Real Madrid's Ferenc Puskás, Alfredo Di Stéfano and Luis del Sol of the 1960–61 season (this was later surpassed by Real Madrid trio Cristiano Ronaldo, Karim Benzema and Gonzalo Higuaín who scored 89 goals in 2011–12). Later in 2009, Henry helped Barcelona win an unprecedented sextuple, consisting of the aforementioned treble, the Supercopa de España, the UEFA Super Cup, and the FIFA Club World Cup.

The following season, the emergence of Pedro meant that Henry only started 15 league games. Before the La Liga season ended, and with a year still left on his contract, club president Joan Laporta stated on 5 May 2010 that Henry "may go away in the summer transfer window if that's what he wants." After Henry returned from the 2010 World Cup, Barcelona confirmed that they had agreed to the sale of Henry to an unnamed club, with the player still to agree terms with the new club.

=== 2010–2014: New York Red Bulls and retirement ===
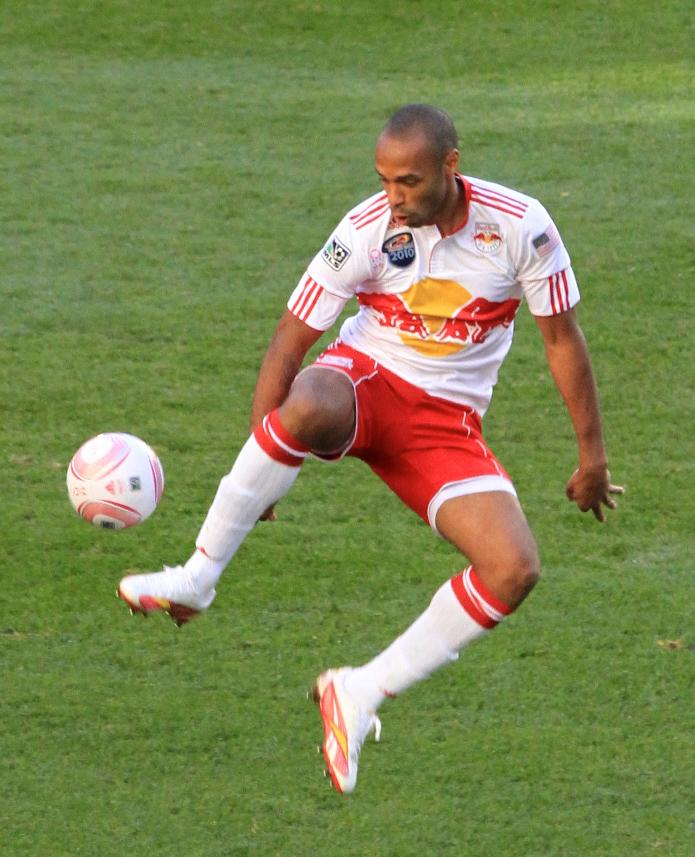
Henry playing for the New York Red Bulls in 2011

In July 2010, Henry signed a multi-year contract with Major League Soccer (MLS) club New York Red Bulls for the 2010 season as its second designated player. He made his full MLS debut on 31 July in a 2–2 draw against Houston Dynamo, assisting both goals to Juan Pablo Ángel. His first MLS goal came on 28 August in a 2–0 victory against San Jose Earthquakes. The Red Bulls eventually topped the MLS Eastern Conference by one point over Columbus Crew before losing 3–2 on aggregate against San Jose Earthquakes in the quarter-finals of the 2010 MLS Cup Playoffs. The next season, the Red Bulls were 10th overall in the league, and bowed out in the Conference semi-finals of the 2011 MLS Cup Playoffs. By 2011, Henry had a non-contractual sponsorship agreement with Dietrich Mateschitz's Red Bull GmbH, and was claimed by the company as a member of the Red Bull "family".

==== Return to Arsenal (loan) ====
After training with Arsenal during the MLS off-season, Henry re-signed for the club on a two-month loan deal on 6 January 2012. This was to provide cover for Gervinho and Marouane Chamakh, who were unavailable due to their participation in the 2012 Africa Cup of Nations. Henry was given the number 12 jersey – his old Arsenal number 14 jersey, the same number he wore at Barcelona and New York, was unavailable, with Theo Walcott inheriting it following Henry's departure from the club in 2007. Henry made his second Arsenal debut as a substitute against Leeds United in the FA Cup third round and scored the only goal. In his last league game on loan, he scored the winning goal in stoppage time in a 2–1 win against Sunderland. His final goals for the club meant he finished his Arsenal career with a record 228 goals; 175 of them came in the Premier League.

==== Return to New York Red Bulls ====
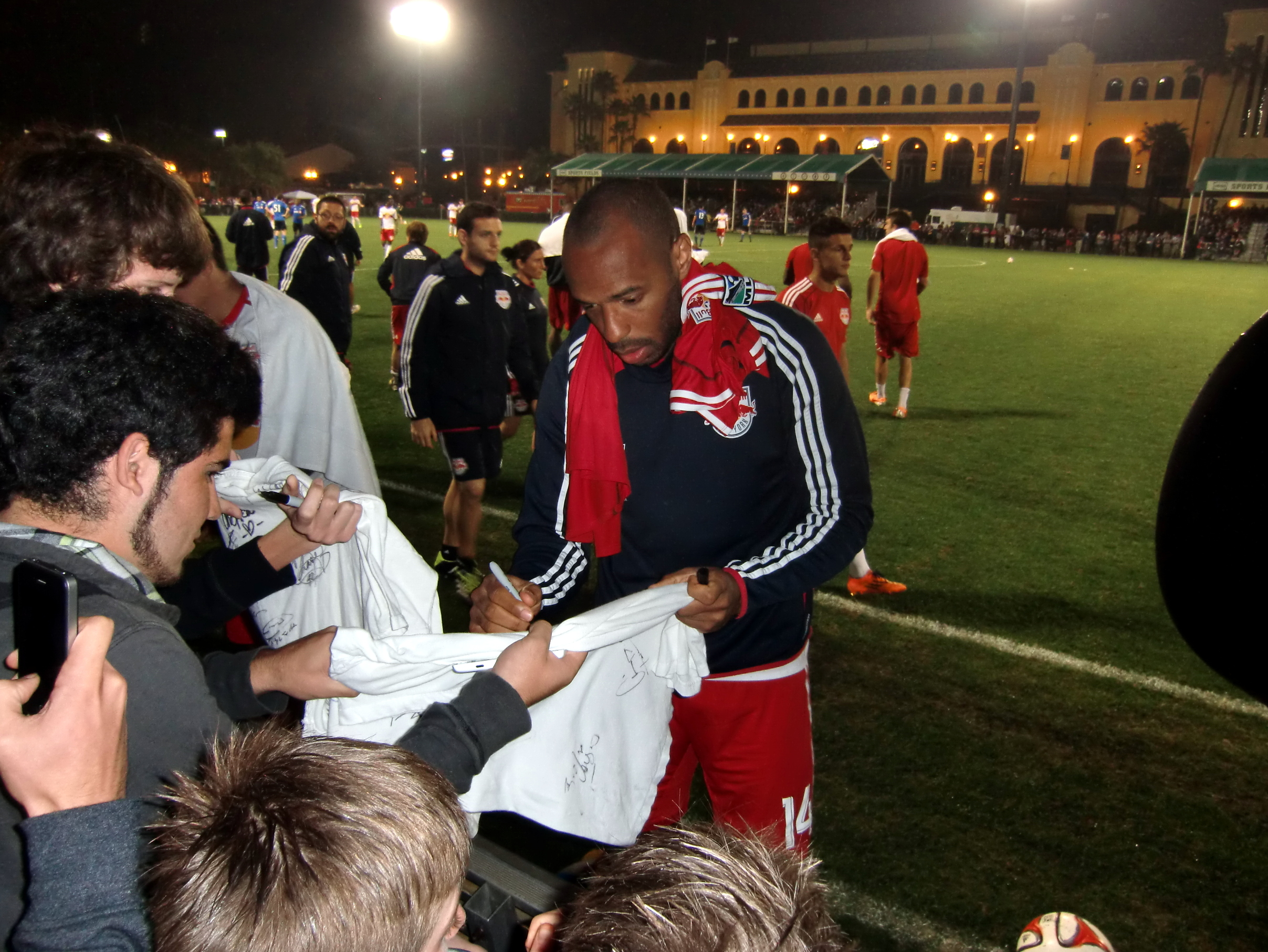
Henry signing autographs in February 2014

On 17 February 2012, Henry returned to Red Bulls to prepare for the 2012 season. His base salary of $5 million ($5.6 million guaranteed) made him the highest-paid player in MLS—surpassing David Beckham, who had taken a salary cut for his last year with the Los Angeles Galaxy. In 2013, Henry's base salary dropped to $3.75 million setting him behind Robbie Keane's $4 million base salary. With bonuses, however, Henry remained the highest-paid player with $4.35 million compared to Keane's $4.33 million.

On 31 March 2012, Henry scored his first MLS hat-trick in a 5–2 Red Bulls win over the Montreal Impact. He was named MLS Player of the Month that same month. On 27 October 2013, Henry scored once and provided two assists in the last game of the season against the Chicago Fire at Red Bull Arena to help his team win 5–2 and become champions of the regular season. It was the club's first major trophy in their 17-year history.

On 12 July 2014, Henry provided a goal and three assists in a 4–1 Red Bulls win over the Columbus Crew. With that effort he became the all-time assist leader for the New York Red Bulls with 37, surpassing Amado Guevara and Tab Ramos.

On 1 December 2014, it was announced that Henry had left the Red Bulls after four and a half years at the club. On 16 December, he announced his retirement as a player and stated that he would begin working for Sky Sports as a pundit. After working at Sky for over three years, Henry quit his position in July 2018 to focus on his career as a coach.

== International career ==
Henry enjoyed a successful career with the France national team, winning the first of his 123 caps in June 1997, when his good form for Monaco was rewarded with a call-up to the Under-20 French national team, where he played in the 1997 FIFA World Youth Championship alongside future teammates William Gallas and David Trezeguet. Within four months, France head coach Aimé Jacquet called Henry up to the senior team. The 20-year-old made his senior international debut on 11 October 1997 in a 2–1 win against South Africa. Jacquet was so impressed with Henry that he took him to the 1998 FIFA World Cup. Although Henry was a largely unknown quantity at international level, he ended the tournament as France's top scorer with three goals. He was scheduled to appear as a substitute in the final, where France beat Brazil 3–0, but Marcel Desailly's sending off forced a defensive change instead. In 1998, he was made a Knight of the Legion of Honour, France's highest decoration.

Henry was a member of France's UEFA Euro 2000 squad, again scoring three goals in the tournament, including the equaliser against Portugal in the semi-final, and finishing as the country's top scorer. France later won the game in extra time following a converted penalty kick by Zinedine Zidane. France went on to defeat Italy in extra-time in the final, earning Henry his second major international medal. During the tournament, Henry was voted man of the match in three games, including the final against Italy.

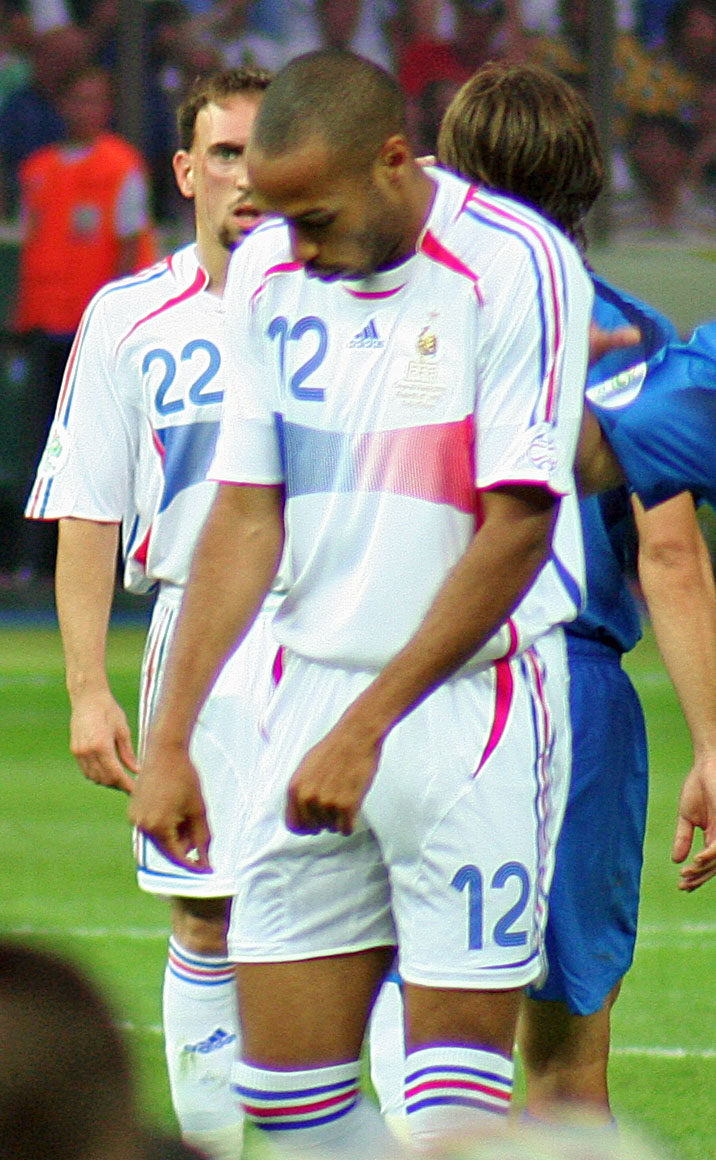
Henry playing for France against Italy during the 2006 FIFA World Cup final. He wore number 12 for France, the same number as his idol Marco van Basten.

The 2002 FIFA World Cup featured a stunning early exit for both Henry and France as the defending champions were eliminated in the group stage after failing to score a goal in all three games. France lost against Senegal in their first group match and Henry was red carded for a dangerous sliding challenge in their next match against Uruguay. In that game, France played to a 0–0 draw, but Henry was forced to miss the final group match due to suspension; France lost 2–0 to Denmark.

Henry returned to form for his country at the 2003 FIFA Confederations Cup. Despite playing without team stalwarts Zidane and Patrick Vieira, France won, in large part owing to Henry's outstanding play, for which he was named Man of the Match by FIFA's Technical Study Group in three of France's five matches. In the final, he scored the golden goal in extra time to lift the title for the host country after a 1–0 victory over Cameroon. Henry was awarded both the Adidas Golden Ball as the outstanding player of the competition and the Adidas Golden Shoe as the tournament's top goalscorer with four goals.

In UEFA Euro 2004, Henry played in all of France's matches and scored two goals. France beat England in the group stage but lost to the eventual winners Greece 1–0 in the quarter-finals. During the 2006 FIFA World Cup Henry remained as one of the automatic starters in the squad. He played as a lone striker, but despite an indifferent start to the tournament, became one of the top players of the World Cup. He scored three goals, including the winning goal from Zidane's free kick against defending champions Brazil in the quarter-final. However, France subsequently lost to Italy on penalties (5–3) in the final. Henry did not take part in the penalty shoot-out, having been substituted in extra time after his legs had cramped. Henry was one of ten nominees for the Golden Ball award for Player of the Tournament, an award which was ultimately presented to his teammate, Zidane and was named a starting striker on the 2006 FIFPro World XI team.

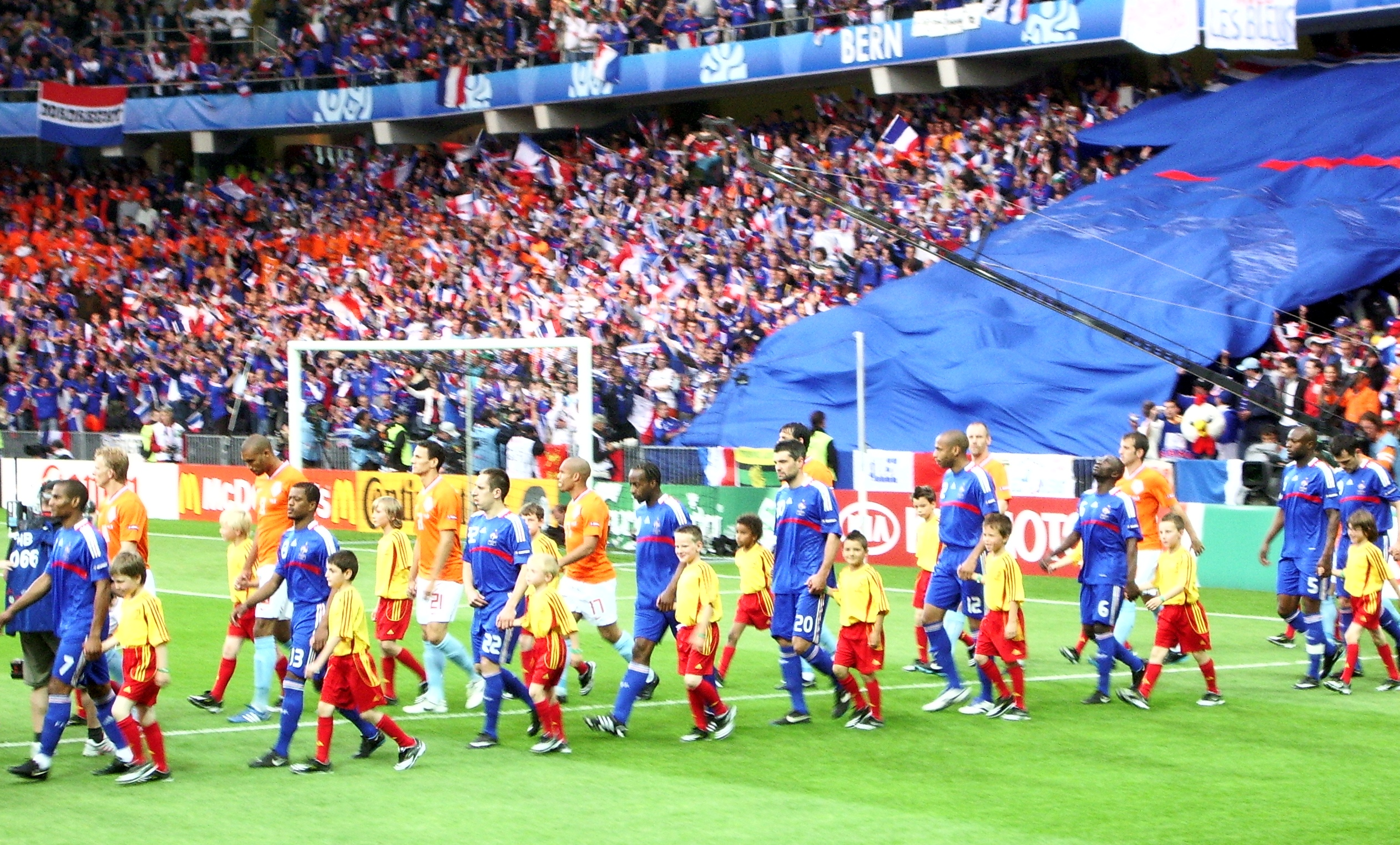
Henry (in blue, fourth from right) enters the field with France in their Euro 2008 game against the Netherlands.

On 13 October 2007, Henry scored his 41st goal against the Faroe Islands, joining Michel Platini as the country's top goalscorer of all time. Four days later at the Stade de la Beaujoire, he scored a late double against Lithuania, thereby setting a new record as France's top goalscorer. On 3 June 2008, Henry made his 100th appearance for the national team in a match against Colombia, becoming the sixth French player ever to reach that milestone.

Henry missed the opening game of France's short-lived UEFA Euro 2008 campaign, where they were eliminated in the group stages after being drawn in the same group as Italy, the Netherlands and Romania. He scored France's only goal in the competition in a 4–1 loss to the Netherlands.

The French team struggled during the 2010 FIFA World Cup qualifiers and finished second in their group behind Serbia. During the play-offs against the Republic of Ireland, Henry was involved in a controversy in the second leg of the game at the Stade de France on 18 November 2009. With the aggregate score tied at 1–1 and the game in extra time, he used his hand twice to control the ball before delivering a cross to William Gallas who scored the winner. This sparked a barrage of criticism against the Frenchman, while national team coach Raymond Domenech and Arsenal manager Arsène Wenger defended him. The Football Association of Ireland lodged a formal complaint with FIFA, seeking a replay of the game, which FIFA declined. Henry said that he contemplated retiring from international football after the reactions to the incident, but maintained that he was not a "cheat"; hours after FIFA had ruled out a replay, he stated that "the fairest solution would be to replay the game". FIFA President Sepp Blatter described the incident as "blatant unfair play" and announced an inquiry into how such incidents could be avoided in future, and added that the incident would be investigated by the Disciplinary Committee. Blatter also said Henry told him that his family had been threatened in the aftermath of the incident. In January 2010, FIFA announced that there was no legal basis to sanction Henry.

Henry did not feature in the starting line-up for France at the 2010 FIFA World Cup. France drew in their first game against Uruguay, and lost 2–0 in their second against Mexico. The team was thrown into disarray when Nicolas Anelka was expelled from the team, and captain Patrice Evra led a team protest by refusing to train. In the final group game against host-nation South Africa in which Henry came on as a second-half substitute, France lost 2–1 and were eliminated from the tournament. He then announced his retirement from international football, having won 123 caps and scored 51 goals for Les Bleus, thus finishing his international career as France's all-time top scorer, and second most capped player after Lilian Thuram.

== Style of play ==
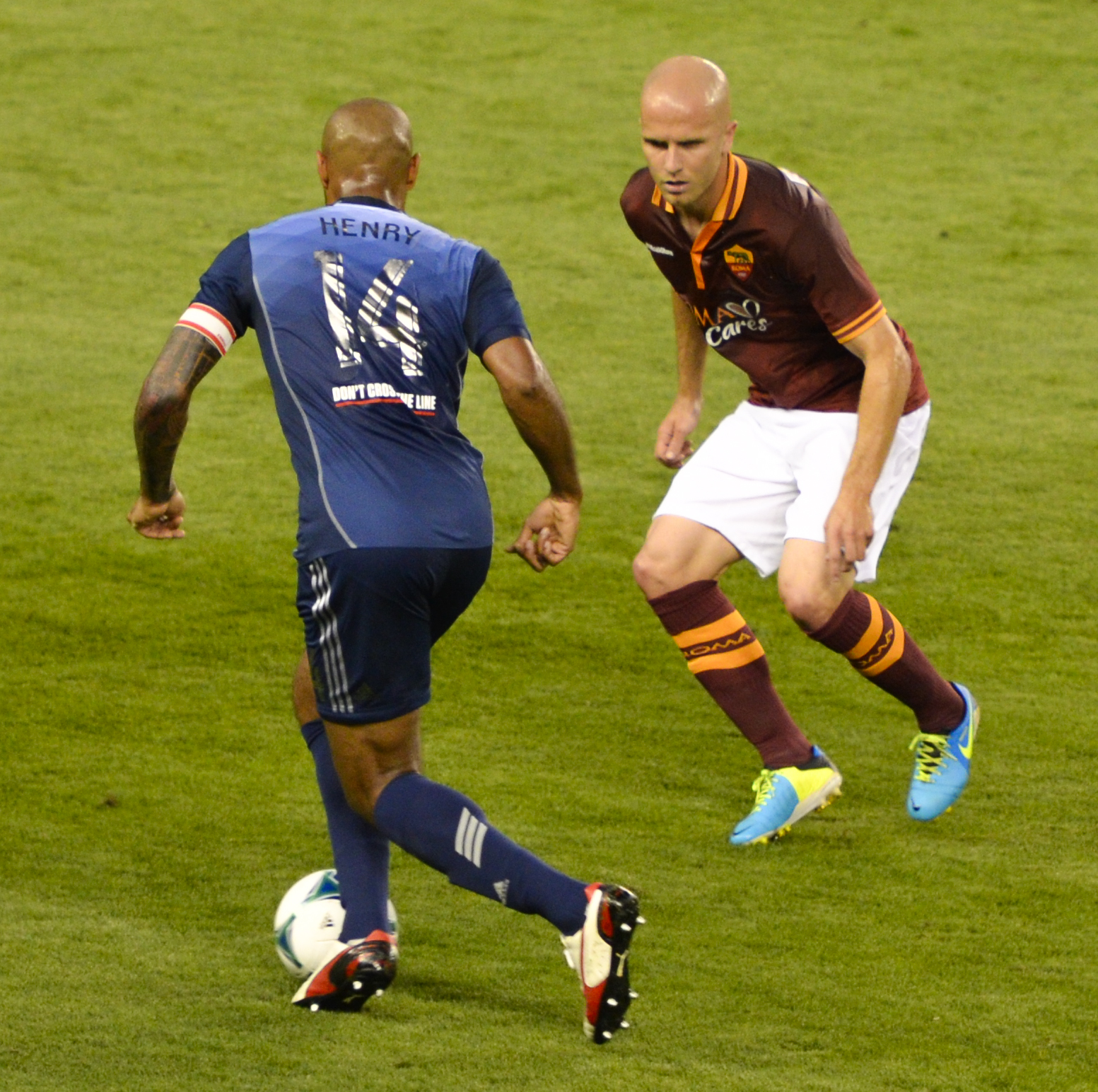
Henry attacking for the MLS All Stars in 2013

Although Henry played up front as a striker during his youth, he spent his time at Monaco and Juventus playing on the wing. When Henry joined Arsenal in 1999, Wenger immediately changed this, switching Henry to his childhood position, often pairing him with Dutch veteran Dennis Bergkamp. During the 2004–05 season, Wenger switched Arsenal's formation to 4–5–1. This change forced Henry to adapt again to fit into the Arsenal team, and he played many games as a lone striker. Still, Henry remained Arsenal's main offensive threat, on many occasions conjuring spectacular goals. Wenger said of his fellow Frenchman: "Thierry Henry could take the ball in the middle of the park and score a goal that no one else in the world could score".

One of the reasons cited for Henry's impressive play up front is his ability to calmly score from one-on-ones. According to his father Antoine, Henry learned precision shooting from watching his idol Marco van Basten. He was also influenced by Romário, Ronaldo and Liberian star George Weah, a new breed of strikers in the 1990s who would also operate outside the penalty area before running with the ball towards goal. At his physical peak from the late 1990s to the mid-2000s, Henry's ability to dribble past opponents with exceptional pace, skill and composure, meant that he could get in behind defenders regularly enough to score. In 2004, former Arsenal striker Alan Smith commented on Henry: "I have to say I haven't seen a player like him. He's an athlete with great technical ability and a tremendous desire to be the best."

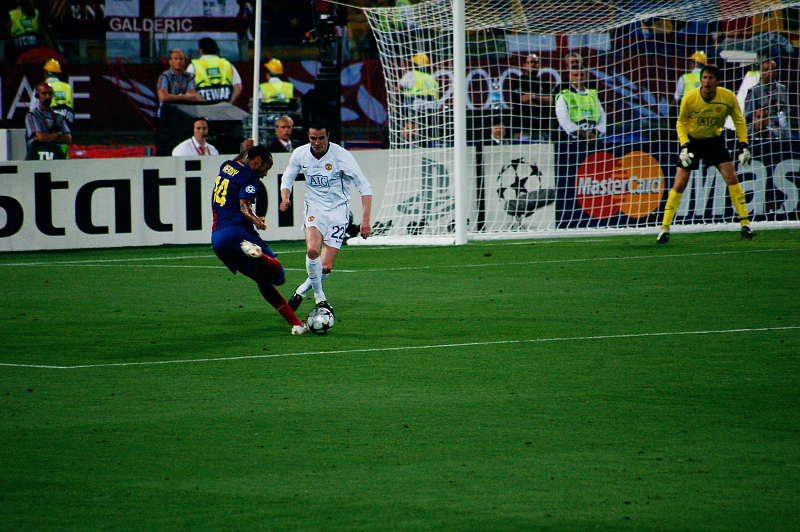
Henry taking on Manchester United defender John O'Shea. In his prime, Henry would often drift out to the left wing position and run towards goal.

When up front, Henry is occasionally known to move out wide to the left wing position, something which enables him to contribute heavily in assists: between 2002–03 and 2004–05, the striker managed almost 50 assists in total and this was attributed to his unselfish play and creativity. Ranking Henry the greatest player in Premier League history, in February 2020 FourFourTwo magazine stated, "No one assisted more in a season. No one has terrorised defenders with such a combination of bewitching grace and phenomenal power."

Coming in from the left, Henry's trademark finish saw him place the ball inside the far right corner of the goal. Henry would also drift offside to fool the defence then run back onside before the ball is played and beat the offside trap, although he never provided Arsenal a distinct aerial threat. Given his versatility in being able to operate as both a winger and a striker, the Frenchman is not a prototypical "out-and-out striker", but he has emerged consistently as one of Europe's most prolific strikers. In set pieces, Henry was the first-choice penalty and free kick taker for Arsenal, scoring regularly from those situations. Henry was also a notable exponent of a no-look pass where he would feint to pass the ball with his right foot, but would make contact with the ball using his standing foot (his left).

== Managerial career ==
=== Arsenal youth ===
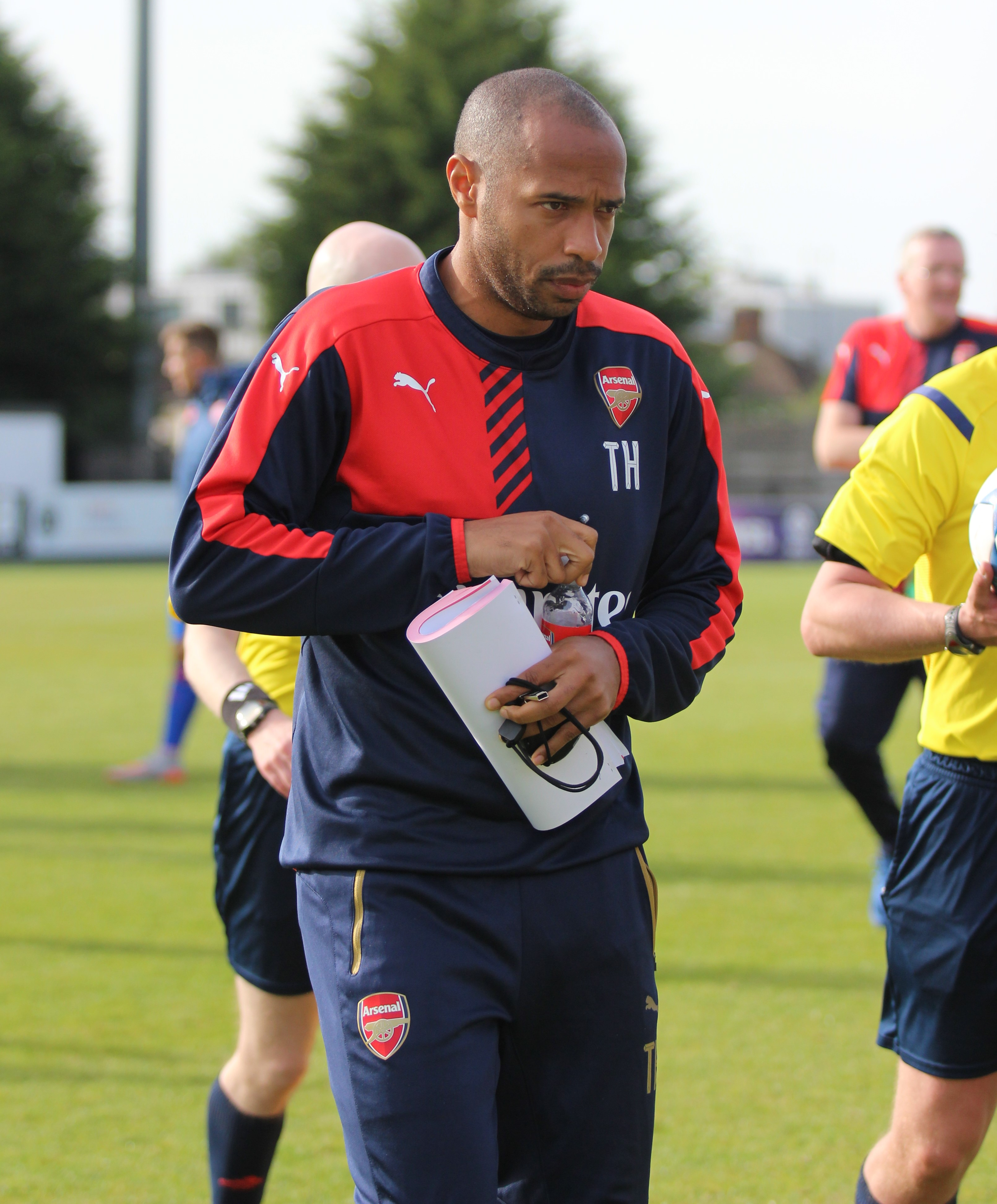
Henry as coach of Arsenal under 19s in September 2015

Henry began coaching Arsenal's youth teams in February 2015, in tandem with his work for Sky Sports. His influence on the team was praised by players such as Alex Iwobi, who dedicated a goal against Bayern Munich in the 2015–16 UEFA Youth League to his advice. Having earned a UEFA A Licence, he was offered the job of under-18 coach by Academy head Andries Jonker, but the decision was overruled by Wenger, who wanted a full-time coach for the team.

=== Belgium (assistant) ===
In August 2016, Henry became second assistant coach of the Belgium national team, working alongside head coach Roberto Martínez and fellow assistant Graeme Jones. In an interview with NBC Sports, Belgium striker Romelu Lukaku praised Henry for his work with him, stating, "Henry is the best thing that has happened to me because since I came to England aged 18 I have had the best mentors. Thierry for me is the best. Every day whether it is positive and negative I take it in my stride because I know what is expected from the top level." At the 2018 FIFA World Cup, Belgium reached the semi-final, but lost to Henry's home nation France 1–0. Henry picked up a Bronze medal after Belgium defeated England 2–0 in the third-place play-off to secure their best ever World Cup finish.

Henry was reportedly offered the position of head coach by Bordeaux in August 2018. However, he declined the offer after disagreements with the club's owners. Days after turning down the Bordeaux job, and following Jones's departure from the Belgium national team, Henry, who had been the forwards coach, was promoted to Belgium assistant coach. However, his tenure in the role was short-lived, after he accepted the role as head coach at former club Monaco in October.

=== Monaco ===
On 11 October 2018, Monaco dismissed Leonardo Jardim as club manager. Jardim's position had become untenable after struggling heavily in domestic competition, with the club 18th at the time of his departure, and disputes over the club's transfer policy. Monaco's search for a new coach coincided with the regulatory mid-season international break, allowing the club sufficient time to search for a replacement, however, they quickly decided on Henry, and he was appointed a mere two days later. He signed a three-year deal, and was unveiled as Monaco manager on 18 October. At his first press conference, he told reporters: "This club will always have a big place in my heart, so to be able to come here and start again, it is a dream come true. There is a lot of work to do, as you can imagine – but I am more than happy to be here".

Henry's arrival at Monaco was greeted with mixed reactions by some media outlets, due to his relative inexperience as a top-level coach and the task of overturning Monaco's misfortunes. Despite inheriting a squad of sub-standard quality, Henry expressed a desire of replicating the football he played under Pep Guardiola at Barcelona, as well as instilling the "professionalism" taught to him by Arsène Wenger. Henry also adopted a hands-on approach to training sessions, being regularly involved in devising schemes and instructing drills. His first match was a 2–1 away defeat against Strasbourg on 20 October. He was unable to secure a win for over a month, enduring a period which included two high-profile defeats against Club Brugge and Paris Saint-Germain, prior to defeating Caen on 1–0 on 25 November. He secured two wins in December, defeating Amiens in the league and Lorient in the Coupe de la Ligue, however, this was on the backdrop of three additional Ligue 1 defeats to close 2018 in the relegation zone.

In January 2019, Henry entered the winter transfer window, where he signed left-back Fodé Ballo-Touré, and former Arsenal teammate Cesc Fàbregas from Chelsea. He also sanctioned the loan signing of French defensive midfielder William Vainqueur on 12 January, and experienced defender Naldo. However, these signings would not turn around the club's fate, and on 24 January, Henry was dismissed at Monaco. The club were 19th at the time of his departure, and Henry left with a record of 4 wins, 5 draws, and 11 defeats, from 20 games in charge.

=== Montreal Impact ===
On 14 November 2019, Henry became manager of Major League Soccer side Montreal Impact, signing a two-year deal until the end of the 2021 season with an option to extend it by a year until the 2022 season. In his first press conference, Henry stated he had to "confront" the relative disappointment of his short stint as manager of Monaco, before undertaking a new job.

After leading Montreal to their first playoff berth in four seasons, on 25 February 2021, prior to the 2021 season, Henry stepped down as head coach of the renamed CF Montréal to be closer to his children in London. He had not been able to see them in the 2020 season due to travel restrictions during the COVID-19 pandemic, and with restrictions continuing into the 2021 season, he decided to end the separation.

=== Return to Belgium (assistant) ===
In May 2021, Henry rejoined the coaching staff of Belgium prior to UEFA Euro 2020. He was also in the team's coaching staff for the 2022 FIFA World Cup. In February 2023, upon the appointment of Domenico Tedesco as Belgium's new head coach, Royal Belgian Football Association CEO Peter Bossaert announced that Henry would not be returning to the national team's coaching staff.

Henry was considered as being one of potential replacements for Corinne Diacre who got fired as France women's national team head coach, but he rejected the approach.

=== France U21 and Olympic ===
On 21 August 2023, Henry was named as the new manager of the France national under-21 team, meaning that he would also coach the France Olympic team at the 2024 Summer Games. He coached the Olympic team to a silver medal, losing the final to Spain, before announcing his resignation as coach on 19 August 2024.

== Media and broadcasting career ==
After leaving Montreal, Henry resumed his punditry career. He joined CBS Sports in their UEFA Champions League coverage as studio analyst on 27 September 2021, as well as being hired by Amazon Prime Video for their Premier League and Ligue 1 programs as consultant. On 4 December 2025, he joined Fox Sports as a studio analyst for coverage of the 2026 FIFA World Cup.

== Reception ==
Remember the kid in the playground who was better than everyone else with a football at his feet? That's what Thierry Henry was like in his pomp. The Frenchman had exquisite technique, searing pace, and like the typical schoolboy superstar, he did pretty much everything for his team.

— Arsenal.com entry for Henry ranking him No. 1 in their list of the 50 Greatest Arsenal Players.

Henry has received many plaudits and awards in his football career. He was runner-up for the 2003 and 2004 FIFA World Player of the Year awards; in those two seasons, he also won back-to-back PFA Players' Player of the Year titles. Henry is the only player ever to have won the FWA Footballer of the Year three times (2003, 2004, 2006), and the French Player of the Year on a record four occasions. Henry was voted into the Premier League Overseas Team of the Decade in the 10 Seasons Awards poll in 2003, and in 2004 he was named by football legend Pelé on the FIFA 100 list of the world's greatest living players.

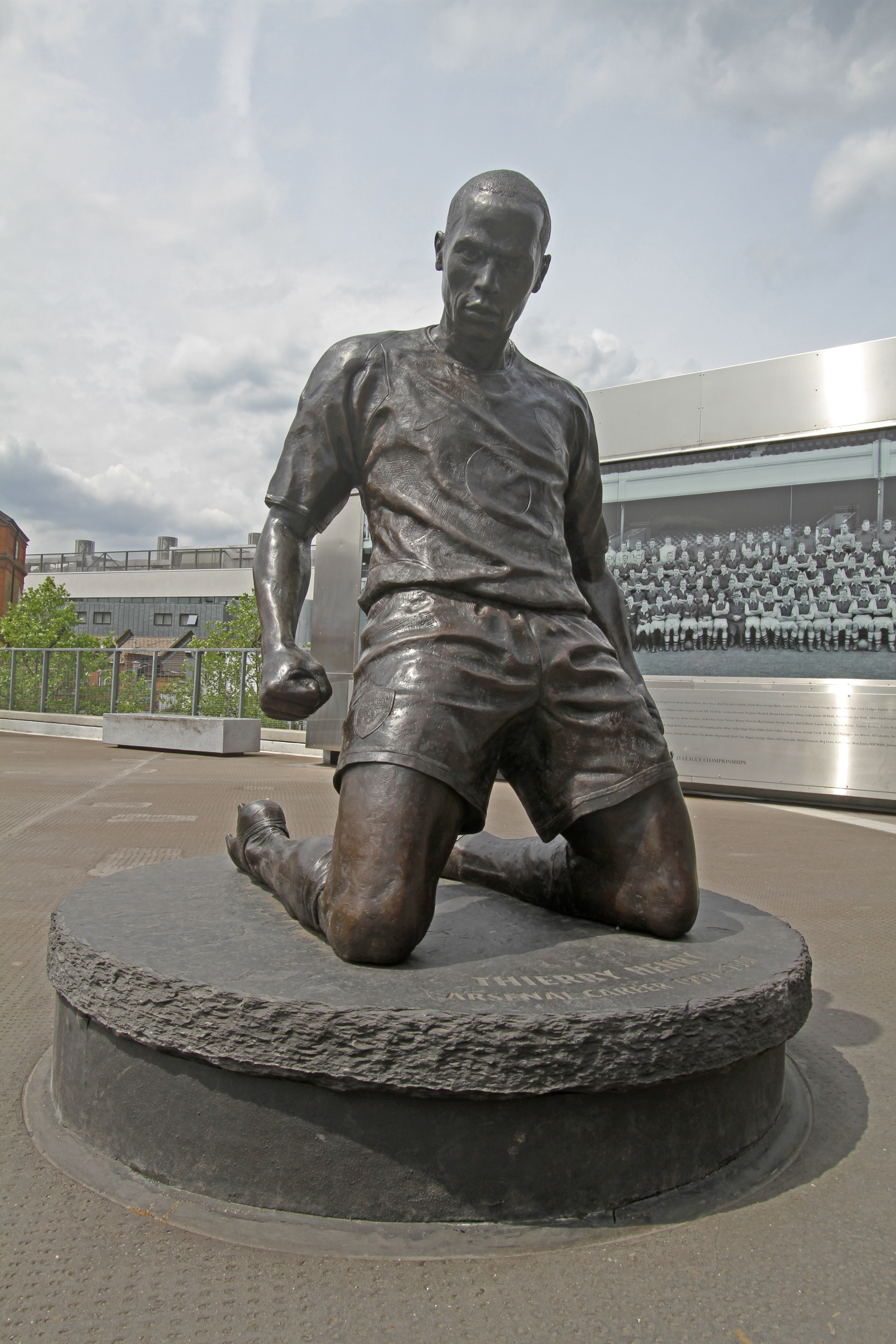
Henry statue outside Arsenal's Emirates Stadium. The statue recreates Henry's goal celebration where he slid to his knees after a goal against Spurs in 2002.

In terms of goal-scoring awards, Henry was the European Golden Boot winner in 2004 and 2005 (sharing it with Villarreal's Diego Forlán in 2005). Henry was also the top goalscorer in the Premier League for a record four seasons (2002, 2004, 2005, 2006). In 2006, he became the first player to score more than 20 goals in the league for five consecutive seasons (2002 to 2006). With 175, Henry is currently seventh in the list of all-time Premier League goalscorers, behind Alan Shearer, Wayne Rooney, Harry Kane, Andy Cole, Sergio Agüero, and Frank Lampard. He held the record for most goals in the competition for one club, until it was broken by Rooney in 2016, and held the record for most goals by a foreign player in the competition until surpassed by Agüero in 2020. France's all-time record goalscorer was, in his prime in the mid-2000s, regarded by many coaches, footballers and journalists as one of the best players in the world. In November 2007, he was ranked 33rd on the Association of Football Statisticians' compendium for "Greatest Ever Footballers".

Arsenal fans honoured their former player in 2008, declaring Henry the greatest Arsenal player. In two other 2008 surveys, Henry emerged as the favourite Premier League player of all time among 32,000 people surveyed in the Barclays 2008 Global Fan Report. Arsenal fan and the Who lead singer Roger Daltrey mentions Henry in the tribute song "Highbury Highs", which he performed at Arsenal's last game at Highbury on 7 May 2006. On 10 December 2011, Arsenal unveiled a bronze statue of Henry at the Emirates Stadium as part of its 125th anniversary celebrations. In 2017, FourFourTwo magazine ranked him first in their list of the 30 best strikers in Premier League history. Daniel Girard of The Toronto Star described Henry as "one of the best players of his generation" in 2010. Henry's former Arsenal manager, Wenger, described him as "one of the greatest players [he had] ever seen" in 2014. In 2019, The Independent ranked Henry in first place in their list of the "100 greatest Premier League players".

== Personal life ==
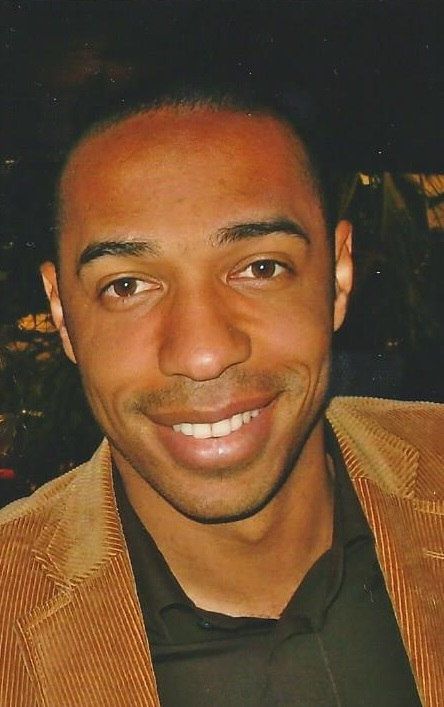
Henry in 2007

Henry married English model Nicole Merry, real name Claire, on 5 July 2003. The ceremony was held at Highclere Castle, and on 27 May 2005 the couple celebrated the birth of their first child, a daughter.

When Henry was still at Arsenal, he purchased a home in Hampstead, North London. Shortly after his transfer to Barcelona, it was announced that Henry and his wife were divorcing; a decree nisi was granted in September 2007, "on the basis of his behavior". The divorce was concluded in December 2008, and Henry paid Merry a settlement close to her requested sum of £10 million.

Henry has been with his second wife, Bosnian model Andrea Rajačić, since 2011. They have three children.

In January 2024, Henry said he had been depressed throughout his career, and that his father had been a demanding presence when he was young.

=== Interest in basketball ===
As a fan of the National Basketball Association (NBA), Henry is often seen with his friend Tony Parker at games when not playing football. Henry stated in an interview that he admires basketball, as it is similar to football in pace and excitement. Having made regular trips to the NBA Finals in the past, he went to watch Parker and the San Antonio Spurs in the 2007 NBA Finals; and in the 2001 NBA Finals, he went to Philadelphia to help with French television coverage of the Finals as well as to watch Allen Iverson, whom he named as one of his favourite players.

=== Interest in rugby union ===
Henry has stated that he is a fan of rugby union, having previously been spotted attending international meets and giving team talks to the French national team. In October 2025, he also hosted several South African rugby players at his London home, including captain Siya Kolisi, Eben Etzebeth and Damian Willemse.

In May 2023, Henry expressed his support for a number of new rules to be introduced to football. These included the introduction of a bonus point if a team scores a certain amount of goal and temporary reversible substitutions for players requiring treatment both of which have already been implemented in rugby.

=== Appearance on screen ===
Henry made a short cameo appearance in the 2015 film Entourage. It shows him walking a dog and having exchange with Ari Gold (character played by Jeremy Piven), who is an over-the-top Hollywood agent. He makes a number of cameo appearances playing himself in the Apple TV+ football comedy series Ted Lasso.

Henry makes a number of appearances in the Amazon Original sports docuseries All or Nothing: Arsenal, which documented the club by spending time with the coaching staff and players behind the scenes both on and off the field throughout their 2021–22 season.

=== Social causes ===
Henry is a member of the UNICEF-FIFA squad, where together with other professional footballers he appeared in a series of TV spots seen by hundreds of millions of fans around the world during the 2002 and 2006 FIFA World Cups. In these spots, the players promote football as a game that must be played on behalf of children.

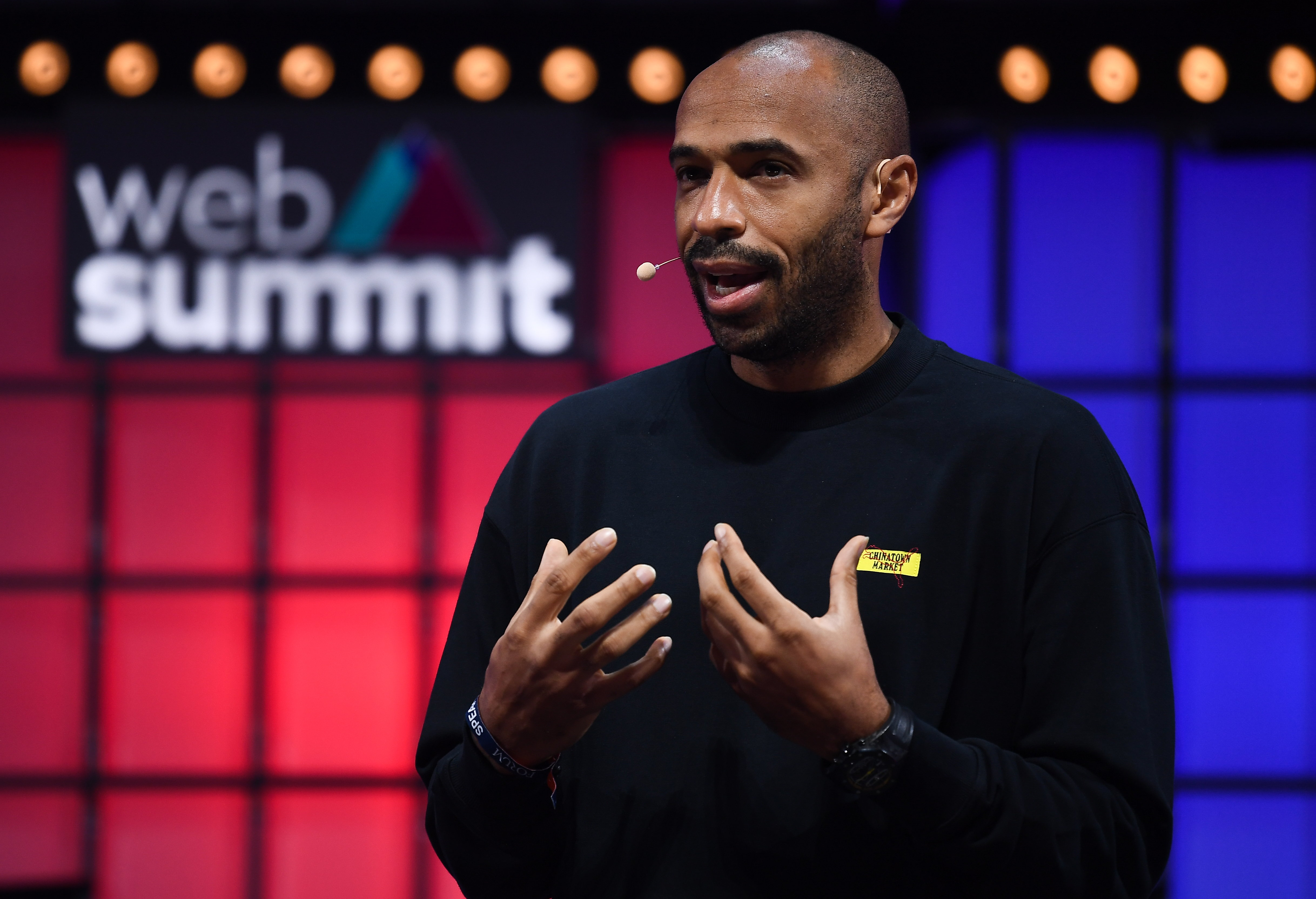
Henry speaking against online bullying at the Web Summit in 2021

Having been subjected to racism in the past, Henry is an active spokesperson against racism in football. The most prominent incident of racism against Henry was during a training session with the Spanish national team in 2004, when a Spanish TV crew caught coach Luis Aragonés referring to Henry as "black shit" to José Antonio Reyes, Henry's teammate at Arsenal. The incident caused an uproar in the British media, and there were calls for Aragonés to be sacked. Henry and Nike started the Stand Up Speak Up campaign against racism in football as a result of the incident. Subsequently, in 2007, Time featured him as one of the "Heroes & Pioneers" on the Time 100 list of the most influential people in the world.

Along with 45 other football players, Henry took part in FIFA's "Live for Love United" in 2002. The single was released in tandem with the 2002 FIFA World Cup and its proceeds went towards AIDS research. Henry also supports the Cystic Fibrosis Foundation and Cystic Fibrosis Trust.

Henry has also played in charity football games for various causes. In June 2018, he reunited with his France 1998 World Cup winning teammates to play a charity game against an All-Star team which included Jamaican sprinter Usain Bolt, with proceeds going to the Mecenet Cardiac Charity and the Children of the World fund. In a 3–2 win for France, Henry played a trademark no-look one-two pass with Zinedine Zidane before scoring with a 20-yard curling strike.

=== Commercial endorsements ===
In 2006, Henry was valued as the ninth-most commercially marketable footballer in the world, and throughout his career he has signed many endorsements and appeared in commercials.

==== Sportswear ====
At the beginning of his career, Henry signed with sportswear giant Nike. In the buildup to the 2002 World Cup in Korea and Japan, Henry featured in Nike's "Secret Tournament" advertisement, directed by Terry Gilliam, along with 24 superstar football players. In a 2004 advertisement, Henry pits his wits against others footballers in locations such as his bedroom and living room, which was partly inspired by Henry himself, who revealed that he always has a football nearby, even at home. In tandem with the 2006 FIFA World Cup, Henry also featured in Nike's Joga Bonito campaign, Portuguese for "beautiful game".

Henry's deal with Nike ended after the 2006 FIFA World Cup, when he signed a deal with Reebok to appear in their "I Am What I Am" campaign. As part of Reebok Entertainment's "Framed" series, Henry was the star of a half-hour episode that detailed the making of a commercial about himself directed by Spanish actress Paz Vega. In 2011, Henry switched to Puma boots.

==== Others ====
Henry featured in the Renault Clio advertisements in which he popularised the term va-va-voom, meaning "life" or "passion". His romantic interest in the commercial was his then-girlfriend, later his wife (now divorced), Claire Merry. "Va-va-voom" was subsequently added to the Concise Oxford English Dictionary.

In February 2007, Henry was named as one of the three global ambassadors of Gillette's "Champions Program", which purported to feature three of the "best-known, most widely respected and successful athletes competing today" and also showcased Roger Federer and Tiger Woods in a series of television commercials. In reaction to the handball controversy following the France vs Ireland 2010 FIFA World Cup qualifier, Gillette faced a boycott and accusations of doctoring French versions of their Champions poster, but subsequently released a statement backing Henry.

Henry was part of Pepsi's "Dare For More" campaign in 2005, alongside the likes of David Beckham and Ronaldinho. He starred in a 2014 advert for Beats headphones with other global football stars including Neymar and Luis Suárez, with the theme of "The Game Before the Game" and the players pre-game ritual of listening to music.

Henry featured on the front cover of the editions of EA Sports' FIFA video game series from FIFA 2001 to FIFA 2005. He was included as an icon to the Ultimate Team in FIFA 18. He was also a cover star for the Konami Pro Evolution Soccer video game series, and was featured on the covers of Pro Evolution Soccer 4 to Pro Evolution Soccer 6.

=== Other interests ===
In August 2022, Serie B club Como announced Henry has joined them as an investor and minority stakeholder.

== Career statistics ==
=== Club ===
Appearances and goals by club, season and competition
Club	Season	League			National cup (Note: Includes Coupe de France, Coppa Italia, FA Cup, Copa del Rey)		League cup (Note: Includes Coupe de la Ligue, Football League Cup)		Continental		Other		Total	
Club	Season	Division	Apps	Goals	Apps	Goals	Apps	Goals	Apps	Goals	Apps	Goals	Apps	Goals
Monaco B	1994–95	CFA	19	6	—		—		—		—		19	6
Monaco	1994–95	Division 1	8	3	0	0	0	0	0	0	—		8	3
Monaco	1995–96	Division 1	18	3	0	0	3	0	1	0	—		22	3
Monaco	1996–97	Division 1	36	9	1	0	2	0	9 (Note: Appearance(s) in UEFA Cup)	1	—		48	10
Monaco	1997–98	Division 1	30	4	4	0	1	0	9 (Note: Appearance(s) in UEFA Champions League)	7	—		44	11
Monaco	1998–99	Division 1	13	1	0	0	1	0	5	0	—		19	1
Monaco	Total		105	20	5	0	7	0	24	8	—		141	28
Juventus	1998–99	Serie A	16	3	1	0	—		0	0	2 (Note: Appearances in Serie A UEFA Cup play-offs)	0	19	3
Juventus	1999–2000	Serie A	0	0	0	0	—		1	0	—		1	0
Juventus	Total		16	3	1	0	—		1	0	2	0	20	3
Arsenal	1999–2000	Premier League	31	17	3	0	2	1	12 (Note: Four appearances and one goal in UEFA Champions League, eight appearances and seven goals in UEFA Cup)	8	—		48	26
Arsenal	2000–01	Premier League	35	17	4	1	0	0	14	4	—		53	22
Arsenal	2001–02	Premier League	33	24	5	1	0	0	11	7	—		49	32
Arsenal	2002–03	Premier League	37	24	5	1	0	0	12	7	1 (Note: Appearance in FA Community Shield)	0	55	32
Arsenal	2003–04	Premier League	37	30	3	3	0	0	10	5	1	1	51	39
Arsenal	2004–05	Premier League	32	25	1	0	0	0	8	5	1	0	42	30
Arsenal	2005–06	Premier League	32	27	0	0	1	1	11	5	1	0	45	33
Arsenal	2006–07	Premier League	17	10	3	1	0	0	7	1	—		27	12
Arsenal	Total		254	174	24	7	3	2	85	42	4	1	370	226
Barcelona	2007–08	La Liga	30	12	7	4	—		10	3	—		47	19
Barcelona	2008–09	La Liga	29	19	1	1	—		12	6	—		42	26
Barcelona	2009–10	La Liga	21	4	1	0	—		6	0	4 (Note: Two appearances in Supercopa de España, one appearance in UEFA Super Cup, one appearance in FIFA Club World Cup)	0	32	4
Barcelona	Total		80	35	9	5	—		28	9	4	0	121	49
New York Red Bulls	2010	Major League Soccer	11	2	0	0	—		—		1 (Note: Appearance(s) in MLS Cup playoffs)	0	12	2
New York Red Bulls	2011	Major League Soccer	26	14	0	0	—		—		3	1	29	15
New York Red Bulls	2012	Major League Soccer	25	15	0	0	—		—		2	0	27	15
New York Red Bulls	2013	Major League Soccer	30	10	0	0	—		—		2	0	32	10
New York Red Bulls	2014	Major League Soccer	30	10	0	0	—		0	0	5	0	35	10
New York Red Bulls	Total		122	51	0	0	—		0	0	13	1	135	52
Arsenal (loan)	2011–12	Premier League	4	1	2	1	0	0	1	0	—		7	2
Career total			600	290	41	13	10	2	139	59	23	2	813	366

=== International ===
Appearances and goals by national team and year
National team	Year	Apps	Goals
France	1997	1	0
France	1998	10	3
France	1999	0	0
France	2000	14^{[A]}	5
France	2001	7	3
France	2002	10	3
France	2003	14	11
France	2004	13	3
France	2005	6	3
France	2006	16	8
France	2007	6	5
France	2008	11	4
France	2009	9	3
France	2010	6	0
Total		123	51

Note

^{A} Includes one appearance from the match against FIFA XI on 16 August 2000 which FIFA and the French Football Federation count as an official friendly match.

=== Managerial ===
As of 9 August 2024

Team	From	To	Record								
Team	From	To	M	W	D	L	GF	GA	GD	Win %	Ref.
Monaco	13 October 2018	24 January 2019	20	4	5	11	15	36	−21	20.00	
Montreal Impact	14 November 2019	25 February 2021	29	9	4	16	38	50	−12	31.03	
France U21	21 August 2023	19 August 2024	6	4	0	2	19	7	+12	66.67	
France Olympic	18 March 2024	9 August 2024	11	8	2	1	31	12	+19	72.73	
Total			66	25	11	30	103	105	−2	37.88	

== Honours ==
=== Player ===
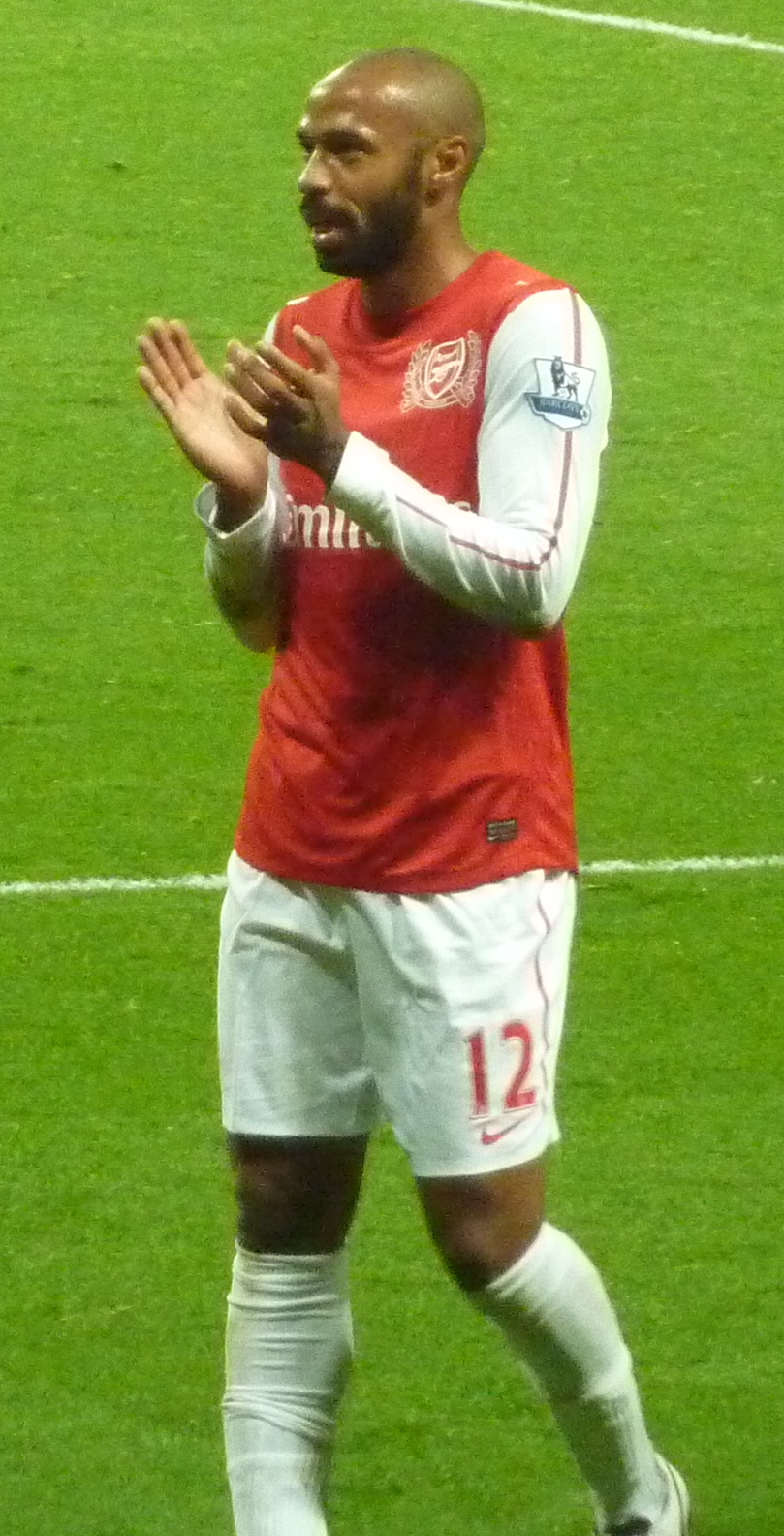
Henry won two Premier League titles with Arsenal.

Monaco

- Division 1: 1996–97

Arsenal

- Premier League: 2001–02, 2003–04
- FA Cup: 2001–02, 2002–03; runner-up: 2000–01
- FA Community Shield: 2002, 2004
- UEFA Champions League runner-up: 2005–06
- UEFA Cup runner-up: 1999–2000

Barcelona

- La Liga: 2008–09, 2009–10
- Copa del Rey: 2008–09
- Supercopa de España: 2009
- UEFA Champions League: 2008–09
- UEFA Super Cup: 2009
- FIFA Club World Cup: 2009

New York Red Bulls

- Supporters' Shield: 2013
- MLS Eastern Conference: 2010, 2013

France U20

- Toulon Tournament: 1997

France

- FIFA World Cup: 1998; runner-up: 2006
- UEFA European Championship: 2000
- FIFA Confederations Cup: 2003

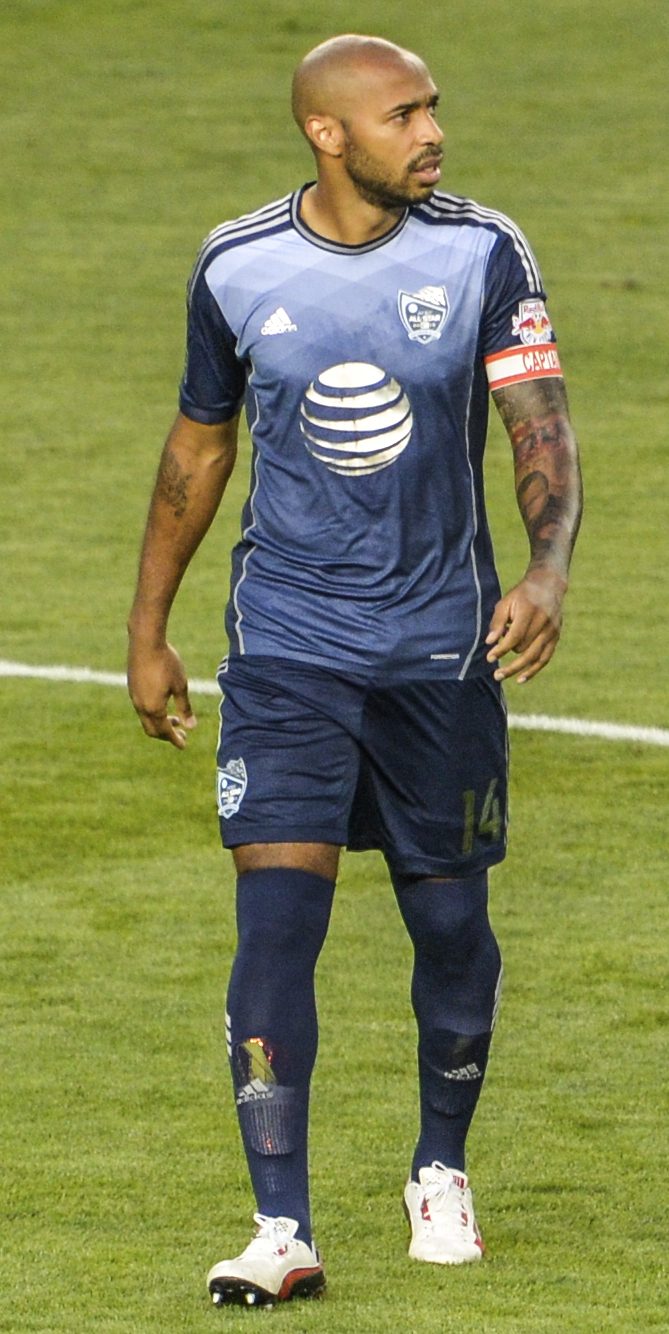
Henry made four appearances for the MLS All-Stars from 2011 to 2014.

Individual

- Ballon d'Or runner-up: 2003; third-place: 2006
- FIFA World Player of the Year silver award: 2003, 2004
- European Golden Shoe: 2003–04, 2004–05
- Onze d'Or: 2003, 2006
- UEFA Euro 2000 final: Man of the Match
- FIFA World Cup All-Star Team: 2006
- FIFA Confederations Cup Golden Ball: 2003
- FIFA Confederations Cup Golden Shoe: 2003
- UNFP Division 1 Young Player of the Year: 1996–97
- PFA Players' Player of the Year: 2002–03, 2003–04
- PFA Fans' Player of the Year: 2002–03, 2003–04
- PFA Team of the Year: 2000–01 Premier League, 2001–02 Premier League, 2002–03 Premier League, 2003–04 Premier League, 2004–05 Premier League, 2005–06 Premier League
- FWA Footballer of the Year: 2002–03, 2003–04, 2005–06
- Premier League Player of the Season: 2003–04, 2005–06
- Premier League Golden Boot: 2001–02, 2003–04, 2004–05, 2005–06
- Most assists in the Premier League: 2002–03
- Golden Boot Landmark Award 10: 2004–05
- Golden Boot Landmark Award 20: 2004–05
- Premier League Player of the Month: April 2000, September 2002, January 2004, April 2004
- Arsenal Player of the Season: 2000, 2003, 2004, 2005
- BBC Goal of the Season: 2002–03
- UEFA Team of the Year: 2001, 2002, 2003, 2004, 2006
- MLS Best XI: 2011, 2012, 2014
- MLS Player of the Month: March 2012
- Best MLS Player ESPY Award: 2013
- MLS All-Star: 2011, 2012, 2013, 2014
- French Player of the Year: 2000, 2003, 2004, 2005, 2006
- IFFHS World's Top Goal Scorer of the Year: 2003
- FIFA FIFPro World XI: 2006
- UEFA European Championship Team of the Tournament: 2000
- FIFA 100: 2004
- Time 100 Heroes & Pioneers no.16: 2007
- English Football Hall of Fame: 2008
- Premier League 10 Seasons Awards (1992–93 – 2001–02):
  - Overseas Team of the Decade
- Premier League 20 Seasons Awards:
  - Fantasy Team (Panel choice)
  - Fantasy Team (Public choice)
- UEFA Ultimate Team of the Year (published 2015)
- UEFA Euro All-time XI (published 2016)
- Ballon d'Or Dream Team (Bronze): 2020
- Premier League Hall of Fame: 2021
- BBC Sports Personality of the Year Lifetime Achievement Award: 2025
- UEFA President's Award: 2026

Orders

- Knight of the Legion of Honour: 1998

=== Manager ===
France Olympic

- Summer Olympics silver medal: 2024

== Records ==
As of August 2025

=== Arsenal ===
- All-time top scorer: 228 goals
- Most league goals: 175 goals
- Most European goals: 42
- Most Champions League goals: 35
- Most Premier League goals in a season: 30 (2003–04) (shared with Robin van Persie)
- Most Premier League hat-tricks: 8
- Most European appearances: 86
- Most Champions League appearances: 78
- Most Arsenal Player of the Season Awards: 4

=== Continental ===
- Most European Golden Shoe wins while playing in England: 2 (2003–04, 2004–05)
- One of five players to win back-to-back European Golden Shoes (shared with Ally McCoist, Lionel Messi, Cristiano Ronaldo and Robert Lewandowski)

=== England ===
- Most FWA Footballer of the Year wins: 3 (2002–03, 2003–04, 2005–06)
- Most consecutive FWA Footballer of the Year wins: 2 (2002–03, 2003–04) (shared with Cristiano Ronaldo)
- Most consecutive PFA Players' Player of the Year wins: 2 (2002–03, 2003–04) (shared with Cristiano Ronaldo and Kevin De Bruyne)

=== France ===
- Most French Player of the Year wins: 5 (2000, 2003, 2004, 2005, 2006)
- Most consecutive French Player of the Year wins: 4 (2003–2006)
- Most appearances at World Cup final tournaments for France: 4 (1998, 2002, 2006, 2010) (shared with Hugo Lloris)

=== Premier League ===
- Most goals with right foot in a 38-game season: 24 (2005–06) (shared with Alan Shearer)
- Most Player of the Season awards: 2 (2003–04, 2005–06) (shared with Cristiano Ronaldo, Nemanja Vidić, Kevin De Bruyne and Mohamed Salah)
- Most goals in London derbies: 43
- Most Golden Boot wins: 4 (2001–02, 2003–04, 2004–05, 2005–06) (shared with Mohamed Salah)
- Most goals on a Friday: 10
- Most consecutive 20+ goal seasons: 5 (2001–02 to 2004–05) (shared with Sergio Agüero)
- Most goals scored under one manager: 175 goals under Arsène Wenger
- Most goals at a single ground: 114 goals at Highbury
- Most direct free kick goals by a foreign player: 12 (shared with Gianfranco Zola and Cristiano Ronaldo)
- Most Golden Boots won in consecutive years: 3 (shared with Alan Shearer)
- Only player to both score and assist 20+ goals in a season (2002–03)

== See also ==
- List of footballers with 100 or more UEFA Champions League appearances
- List of top international men's football goalscorers by country
- List of men's footballers with 100 or more international caps
- List of men's footballers with 50 or more international goals
- List of FIFA World Cup top goalscorers
