= Fali (footballer, born 1986) =

Spanish footballer

Personal information
- Full name: Rafael Romero Serrano
- Date of birth: 22 February 1986 (age 40)
- Place of birth: Córdoba, Spain
- Height: 1.77 m (5 ft 9 1/2 in)
- Position: Right back

Youth career
- Córdoba

Senior career*
Years	Team	Apps	(Gls)
2004–2006	Córdoba B		
2005–2006	Córdoba	11	(0)
2006–2007	Barcelona C	27	(0)
2007–2008	Barcelona B	14	(0)
2008	Barcelona	1	(0)
2008–2009	Terrassa	11	(0)
2009–2012	Écija	75	(1)
Total		139	(1)
- * Club domestic league appearances and goals

Rafael Romero Serrano (born 22 February 1986), known as Fali, is a Spanish retired footballer who played as a right back.

== Club career ==
=== Córdoba ===
Born in Córdoba, Andalusia, Fali began his career at local Córdoba CF, starting out as a senior with the reserves. He made his professional debut with the first team on 27 March 2005, as a substitute in a goalless home draw against Sporting de Gijón in the Segunda División; it was his sole appearance of the season, which ended with relegation.

Fali appeared in ten more matches for the main squad, all in the following campaign's Segunda División B.

=== Barcelona ===
Fali joined FC Barcelona in 2006, playing initially in their C and B sides. On 11 May 2008 he was included in the first team's matchday squad for the first time, remaining unused in a 3–2 defeat to RCD Mallorca at the Camp Nou. He made his only appearance for the Blaugrana six days later, coming on as a substitute for Lilian Thuram for the final 19 minutes of a 5–3 win at Real Murcia which concluded the season.

=== Later years ===
In the summer of 2008, Fali signed with third-tier club Terrassa FC. The following year, he moved to Écija Balompié of the same league.

Fali scored the only goal of his career on 28 February 2010, the 94th-minute sole strike in an away victory over Moratalla CF.
