= Supermodelo =

- Genre: Reality
- Starring: Judit Mascó (1-2); Eloísa González (3)
- Opening theme: "Capable" - Najwa Nimri
- Country of origin: Spain
- No. of seasons: 3

Production
- Production locations: Madrid, Spain

Original release
- Network: Cuatro
- Release: August 22, 2006 – June 20, 2008

Supermodelo (English: Supermodel) was a Spanish reality television and modeling competition which ran from 2006 to 2008, with three seasons being broadcast.

The show employed a team of teachers who helped train aspiring models. The teachers for the first season were stylist (and director of the training center in season 2) Cristina Rodríguez, runway trainer Valerio Pino, trainer Jimmy Roca, and photographer Emmanuel Rouzic. For the second season, dance instructor Rubén Nsue, nutritionist Javier Martínez, acting coach Marta Romero, and etiquette instructor Vanesa Romero joined the show. For the third season, the only returning teacher was Emmanuel Rouzic; Marie-Ange Schmitt-Lebreton became the new director and runway trainer and José "Josie" Fernández became the new stylist. Supermodelo was hosted by Spanish model Judit Mascó for the first two seasons. Eloísa González replaced her for season 3.

Each eliminee was determined on a weekly basis by public voting. The program aimed to find a Spanish representative for the Elite Model Look contest. The first two seasons featured exclusively female casts, while the third featured both male and female contestants. The last season was divided into two separate competitions: male and female, with one male and one female winner being chosen.

== Seasons ==
Season	Premiere date	Winner	Runner-up	Other contestants in order of elimination	Number of contestants	Destination
1	August 27, 2006	María José Gallego	Yasmín García	Odilia Garcia, Christel Castaño, Cristina Palavra, Yanira Catalá, Fina Rodrigo, Laura Beigveder, Graciela Tallón, Malena Costa, Elisabeth Kweku, Laura Negrete, Mayte Prieto	13	Venice
2	August 13, 2007	Noelia López	Magdalena Pérez	Lisa Charlotte & Janire Alejos & Gracia de Torres & Dabryna Sedeno, Irene Valerón, Paola Ditano, Raquel Hernández, Marta Abarrategui, Sandra Girón, Jessica Ruíz, Marta Vicente (quit), Silvia Salleras, Paula Hidalgo, Paula Bernaldez, Zaida Rodríguez (quit), Paloma Bloyd, Alba Carrillo, Isabel Cañete	20	None
3	April 28, 2008	Eva Prieto & Oliver Baggerman	Maria Amparo Gracía & Javier Vázquez	Abdel Abdelkader & Isabel Conejo, Mario Rodríguez & Nora Gárate, Luis Jiménez & Raquel Martínez, Benito Daza & Marcela Fuentes, Andrés Moreno & Catalina Agilar, Arturo Gálvez & Yara Cobo, Iván Plata & Mamen Solís, Aaron Marínez & Belén Alarcón	20	Savona; Rome; Palermo; Valletta; Tunis

== Viewing figures ==
Season	Episodes	Premiere	Finale	Average audience	
Season	Episodes	Premiere	Finale	Viewers	Share
1	12	27 August 2006	8 November 2006	1,177,000	8.5%
2	14	27 August 2007	26 November 2007	1,072,000	8.0%
3	39	28 April 2008	20 June 2008	649,000	5.5%
Total	65	27 August 2006	20 June 2008	966,000	7.3%
