= Supermodelo 2008 =

- Season 2008
- Promotial photograph of the cast of Supermodelo 2008
- No. of episodes: 39

Release
- Original network: Cuatro
- Original release: April 28 – June 20, 2008

Season chronology
- ← Previous; Season 2

Supermodelo 2008 was the third and final season of Supermodelo. This season saw significant changes when former host Judit Mascó was replaced by Eloísa González. For the first time, male contestants were allowed to participate in a separate competition from the females, whose winner would eventually be the representative for Spain in the annual Elite Model Look contest as in the two previous years. Various changes and variations of the format proved to be very unpopular with Spanish audience and the show was cut after a total of eight weeks on air. The last week of the competition saw the back to back eliminations of the seventh, sixth, fifth and fourth placers, and the live final took place that same week on June 20 with the remaining six contestants. The winners of the competition were 21 year old Eva Prieto from Barcelona and 20 year old Oliver Baggerman from Tenerife.

== Format ==
The main competition was held live, and a public vote determined who would be eliminated each week. Three contestants from each gender were nominated by the judges every week. Emmanuel Rouzic, José Fernández-Pacheco, and Marie-Ange Schmitt-Lebreton would each chose two nominees for elimination. Prior to this, two contestants would be granted immunity from elimination. The breakdown of each week was as follows:

- On Wednesdays, one contestant of each gender would be granted immunity.
- On Thursdays, three female contestants would be selected to go against the public vote for elimination.
- On Fridays, three male contestants would be selected to go against the public vote for elimination.
- On Mondays, a nominated female contestant would be eliminated.
- On Tuesdays, a nominated male contestant would be eliminated.

No elimination took place on the Monday or Tuesday of the first round of the finals, as there had been no nominees up to that point.

== Episodes ==
Episodes aired from Monday through Friday beginning on April 28. Week 7 had only 4 episodes, as no episode aired on Tuesday June 10.

=== Casting ===
Originally aired: 28 April - 2 May; 5–9 May; 12–16 May 2008

In the beginning of the show the top 25 semi-finalists from each gender, a total of fifty contestants, were invited to an official casting audition which took part on a Costa cruise ship. On the first day, thirty semi-finalists were eliminated, leaving a total of 20 semi-finalists. The selected contestants boarded at the Port of Barcelona, and the ship began sailing east, continuing down the Italian Peninsula to visit locations like Savona and Rome. The ship later stopped on the island of Sicily to visit Palermo, and made additional stops in Malta and Tunisia. All throughout the voyage, the models received visits from fashion experts for various lessons and photo shoot sessions. After several days of eliminations the top 8 of each gender was selected and the final 16 contestants moved into the model villa.

=== Week 1 ===
Originally aired: 19–23 May 2008

The sixteen finalists had their measurements taken, and two new contestants, Mario and Nora, entered the competition.

- Entered: Mario Rodríguez & Nora Gárate

Judge and photographer Emmanuel Rouzic had a photo shoot session with the models. They also had a small presentation for Custo Barcelona, and were taught how to style themselves. 2007 winner Noelia López met with the models to share her experiences on the show. They also received a lesson on fitness and healthy eating from Martina Miserachs. Afterwards, there was a 60's themed mock runway show where styling professor Josie (José Fernández-Pacheco) went over everyone's personal sense of style. This was followed by a third and final runway inspired by the Dos de Mayo Uprising. Andres was granted immunity through the consensus of the female contestants, while Raquel was granted immunity through the consensus of the male contestants.

- Immune from elimination: Andrés Moreno & Raquel Martínez

Based on the results of the photo shoot, Rouzic chose Mario and Isabel as his nominees for elimination. The following day Josie chose Luis and Nora as the second nominees for elimination. The models had a runway lesson with Hernando Herrera, and the females had a photo shoot on a construction site. Rosa Clará arrived with the contestants to invite Yara to her runway show in Barcelona, along with a night out and a runway appearance at Lacroix. She was also given the opportunity to take one of the other models along with her, and she chose Javier. Judge Marie-Ange Schmitt-Lebreton deemed Javier as the best model of the week, and he was awarded €1,000 to go shopping.

- Supermodel of the week: Javier Vázquez

The contestants found out that they would be having a runway show with dogs, and tensions were high in anticipation of the last round of nominations. The three professors went over everyone's progress and attitude throughout the week, and Marie-Ange chose Abdel and Belén as her nominees for elimination.

- Nominated for elimination: Abdel Abdelkade, Belén Alarcón, Isabel Conejo, Luis Jiménez, Mario Rodríguez & Nora Gárate

=== Week 2 ===
Originally aired: 26–30 May 2008

The three nominated female contestants had to pack their bags in preparation for the results of the public vote. The models took part in a live runway show, and the first girl to be saved by the public was Nora. Before the final save, the show went over footage of dinner between the contestants and Fiona Ferrer Leoni, a fictitious wedding between Ivan and Amparo, and a car photo shoot session Rouzic. After a second runway show, it was revealed that Isabel had received the least support from the public, and she was eliminated from the competition. The male elimination was scheduled for the following day.

- Eliminated: Isabel Conejo

Before finding out who would be the first male contestant saved from elimination, the show went over a wet and sensual photo shoot in a pool with Rouzic. Host Eloísa González revealed that Mario was safe from elimination. This was followed by a runway show in underwear, and footage of new nutrition classes, dance lessons, and a styling class with Josie. After the final runway show of the night, Abdel was eliminated from the competition.

- Eliminated: Abdel Abdelkade

On the Wednesday after the eliminations, the contestants had to determine who would be given immunity. The boys had a fashion show with designer Ion Fiz, in which they had to demonstrate elegance and class. After the show, the girls decided that Oliver should be given immunity. The female contestants had a runway with snakes, and the male contestants granted their immunity to Mamen.

- Immune from elimination: Mamen Solís & Oliver Baggerman

The following day, the professors had to select three of the female contestants for elimination. Meanwhile, Yara and Javier went to Barcelona for the Rosa Clará runway show that had been planned the previous week. Ion Fiz had a show with the girls. After an angels and devils themed photo shoot, Rouzic nominated Yara for elimination. A nude runway in which the girls wore nothing but the bags they carried took place after that. Josie decided to nominate Nora for elimination, while Marie-Ange nominated Amparo.

- Nominated for elimination: María Amparo Gracia, Nora Gárate & Yara Cobo

Catalina and Amparo were given makeovers, and Mamen was chosen as the model of the week. The contestants later had a roller-blade runway show in pairs, and Arturo, Iván and Mario were chosen as the new male nominees for elimination.

- Supermodel of the week: Mamen Solís
- Nominated for elimination: Arturo Galvéz, Iván Plata & Mario Rodríguez

=== Week 3 ===
Originally aired: 2–6 June 2008

The three nominees, Amparo, Nora, and Yara along with the other contestants walked in a gothic style runway show. Afterwards, the show reviewed a sexy bedroom photo shoot the contestants had earlier with Andres Amoros. At the end of the gala, it was revealed that Nora had received the fewest votes, and she was eliminated.

- Eliminated: Nora Gárate

The opening runway show the next day was an homage to Yves Saint Laurent. The first male contestant saved from elimination was Ivan. Afterwards, the show went over footage of new modeling classes and a vampire photo shoot, and the final fashion show of the day took place. Immediately after this Mario was eliminated from the competition.

- Eliminated: Mario Rodríguez

The remaining 16 models walked for Elio Berhanyer and had a photo shoot where they posed as statues. Belen was given immunity from elimination. She was also given the chance to walk in an important show in Mallorca. The models then had a dance lesson with Adrián Herrero and a second fashion show after which Arturo was given immunity. Marie-Ange declared that Mamen had been the best during the shows, and the contestants learned that they would be having a photo shoot session with Vicent Calderon. Mamen and Andrés were also selected for an individual shoot for Fórmula Joven.

- Immune from elimination: Arturo Gálvez & Belén Alarcón

On the following day, the male nominations took place. The contestants were scolded for enjoying time off instead of practicing for the runway, a show with designs from Luis Mercader. Luis was nominated for elimination once again. The models had their photo shoot with Vicente Calderon, with the exception of Mamen and Andrés, who had their shoot for Fórmula Joven. After a final runway show, Oliver and Aarón were nominated for elimination.

- Nominated for elimination: Aarón Martínez, Luis Jiménez & Oliver Baggerman

Andrés, Mamen and Raquel received makeovers, and two new contestants, Benito and Marcela, entered the competition. Catalina was chosen as the model of the week, and was rewarded with €1,000 to go shopping. After a runway show and photo shoot, Yara's poor performance earned her a nomination. The models also had a dinner to cheer their spirits. This was followed by a geeky and nerdy runway show the following day, where Eva and Raquel were nominated for elimination. In the end, it was revealed that there would be a double elimination at the beginning of the following week.

- Entered: Benito Daza & Marcela Fuentes
- Supermodel of the week: Catalina Aguilar
- Nominated for elimination: Eva Prieto, Raquel Martínez & Yara Cobo

=== Week 4 ===
Originally aired: 9–13 June 2008

The models explored femininity and masculinity, and took part in an androgynous runway show. Out of the three male nominees, Luis was chosen by the public to be eliminated. The show then went over footage of a sexy kissing photo shoot session, and a trip where the contestants traveled to Zaragoza for a fashion exposition. After a second fashion show celebrating ethnicity, the results of the female nominees were revealed, and Raquel was eliminated from the competition.

- Eliminated: Luis Jiménez & Raquel Martínez

Tension in the training center mounted over food consumption. The remaining models had a body painting fashion show and shoot with the colors of the Spanish flag for the 2008 UEFA European Football Championship. After a second runway show with designs by Miguel Suay, Javier was given immunity. The models later had a bathing suit show with Paula Vázquez, and a final show separated into two groups led by Arturo and Belen. Marie-Ange chose Belen's group as the winners. After this, Eva was granted immunity.

- Immune from elimination: Eva Prieto & Javier Vázquez
- Nominated for elimination: Marcela Fuentes, María Amparo Gracia & Yara Cobo
- Nominated for elimination: Andrés Moreno, Benito Daza e Iván Plata

=== Week 5 ===
Originally aired: 16–20 June 2008

- Eliminated: Benito Daza & Marcela Fuentes
- Eliminated: Andrés Moreno & Catalina Aguilar
- Supermodel of the week: María Amparo Gracia
- Eliminated: Arturo Gálvez & Yara Cobo
- Eliminated: Iván Plata & Mamen Solís
- Eliminated: Aarón Martínez & Belén Alarcón
- Runners-up: Javier Vázquez & María Amparo Gracia
- Supermodelo 2008: Eva Prieto & Oliver Baggerman

== Contestants ==
(ages stated are at start of contest)

Contestant	Age	Hometown	Finish	Place
Isabel Conejo	18	Málaga	Episode 20	20-19
Abdel Abdelkader	22	Melilla	Episode 20	20-19
Nora Gárate	21	Biscay	Episode 25	18-17
Mario Rodríguez	20	Zaragoza	Episode 25	18-17
Luis Jiménez	23	Palma	Episode 34	16-15
Raquel Martínez	22	Coruña	Episode 34	16-15
Marcela Fuentes	22	Barranquilla	Episode 35	14-13
Benito Daza	24	Málaga	Episode 35	14-13
Catalina Aguilar	20	Córdoba	Episode 36	12-11
Andrés Moreno	22	Málaga	Episode 36	12-11
Arturo Gálvez	23	Almería	Episode 37	10-9
Yara Cobo	22	Castellón	Episode 37	10-9
Iván Plata	23	Málaga	Episode 38	8-7
Mamen Solís	20	Sevilla	Episode 38	8-7
Aarón Martínez	22	Madrid	Episode 39	6-5
Belén Alarcón	22	Barcelona	Episode 39	6-5
Javier Vázquez	22	Coruña	Episode 39	4-3
María Amparo Gracia	20	Valencia	Episode 39	4-3
Oliver Baggerman	20	Tenerife	Episode 39	1
Eva Prieto	21	Barcelona	Episode 39	1

== Results ==
Place	Model	Week								
Place	Model	1	2	3	4	5				
Place	Model	(5/19) - (5/23)	(5/26) - (5/30)	(6/2) - (6/6)	(6/9) - (6/13)	(6/16)	(6/17)	(6/18)	(6/19)	(6/20)
1	Eva	SAFE	SAFE	NOM	IMM.	SAFE	SAFE	SAFE	FINAL	WINNER
1	Oliver	SAFE	IMM.	NOM	SAFE	SAFE	SAFE	SAFE	FINAL	WINNER
2	Javier	SAFE ★	SAFE	SAFE	IMM.	SAFE	SAFE	SAFE	FINAL	ELIM
2	Mª Amparo	SAFE	NOM	SAFE	NOM	SAFE	SAFE	SAFE ★	FINAL	ELIM
3	Aarón	SAFE	SAFE	NOM	SAFE	SAFE	SAFE	SAFE	FINAL	ELIM
3	Belén	NOM	SAFE	IMM.	SAFE	SAFE	SAFE	SAFE	FINAL	ELIM
4	Iván	SAFE	NOM	SAFE	NOM	SAFE	SAFE	SAFE	ELIM	
4	Mamen	SAFE	IMM. ★	SAFE	SAFE	SAFE	SAFE	SAFE	ELIM	
5	Arturo	SAFE	NOM	IMM.	SAFE ★	SAFE	SAFE	ELIM		
5	Yara	SAFE	NOM	NOM	NOM	SAFE	SAFE	ELIM		
6	Andrés	IMM.	SAFE	SAFE	NOM	SAFE	ELIM			
6	Catalina	SAFE	SAFE	SAFE ★	SAFE	SAFE	ELIM			
7	Benito			SAFE	NOM	ELIM				
7	Marcela			SAFE	NOM	ELIM				
8	Luis	NOM	SAFE	NOM	ELIM					
8	Raquel	IMM.	SAFE	NOM	ELIM					
9	Mario	NOM	NOM	ELIM						
9	Nora	NOM	NOM	ELIM						
10	Abdel	NOM	ELIM							
10	Isabel	NOM	ELIM							

★ The contestant was chosen as the model of the week
IMM. The contestant was immune from elimination
NOM The contestant was nominated for elimination
ELIM The contestant was eliminated
FINAL The contestant advanced to the finale
WINNER The contestant won the competition

- Beginning on June 17 after the final eliminations based on the nominations of week 4, the remaining contestants were eliminated based solely on the public vote. The final six (Aarón, Belén, Eva, Javier, M.ª Amparo and Oliver) participated in the live final, where Eva and Oliver were crowned as the winners.

== Judges and mentors ==
- Eloísa González - host
- Marie-Ange Schmitt-Lebreton - head of the training center; former model & judge
- Emmanuel Rouzic - photographer & judge
- José Fernández-Pacheco "Josie" - styling professor & judge
- Adrián Herrero - dance instructor
- Andrés Amorós - assistant photographer
- Fiona Ferrer Leoni - fashion coordinator
- Hernando Herrera - male runway coach
- Jimmy Roca - fitness coach
- Laura Romero - makeup artist
- Martina Miserachs - nutritionist
- Montserrat Heras - female runway coach
- Raquel Peñaranda - assistant photographer
- Ricardo Jordán - acting instructor

== Viewing figures ==
Episode	Air date	Viewers & share
1	28 April 2008	1,060,000 (9.1%)
2	29 April 2008	845,000 (7.2%)
3	30 April 2008	704,000 (6.0%)
4	1 May 2008	669,000 (5.8%)
5	2 May 2008	678,000 (5.8%)
6	5 May 2008	732,000 (6.2%)
7	6 May 2008	771,000 (6.6%)
8	7 May 2008	747,000 (6.3%)
9	8 May 2008	657,000 (5.5%)
10	9 May 2008	717,000 (5.8%)
11	12 May 2008	754,000 (6.2%)
12	13 May 2008	612,000 (5.2%)
13	14 May 2008	632,000 (5.3%)
14	15 May 2008	756,000 (6.5%)
15	16 May 2008	747,000 (6.2%)
16	19 May 2008	744,000 (6.3%)
17	20 May 2008	567,000 (5.0%)
18	21 May 2008	557,000 (4.8%)
19	22 May 2008	569,000 (5.1%)
20	23 May 2008	539,000 (4.6%)
21	26 May 2008	655,000 (5.4%)
22	27 May 2008	633,000 (5.2%)
23	28 May 2008	551,000 (4.6%)
24	29 May 2008	713,000 (6.0%)
25	30 May 2008	751,000 (6.2%)
26	2 June 2008	725,000 (5.7%)
27	3 June 2008	640,000 (5.3%)
28	4 June 2008	630,000 (5.1%)
29	5 June 2008	642,000 (5.3%)
30	6 June 2008	456,000 (3.9%)
31	9 June 2008	518,000 (4.1%)
32	11 June 2008	491,000 (4.1%)
33	12 June 2008	491,000 (4.2%)
34	13 June 2008	564,000 (4.8%)
35	16 June 2008	656,000 (5.3%)
36	17 June 2008	543,000 (4.7%)
37	18 June 2008	531,000 (4.6%)
38	19 June 2008	484,000 (4.3%)
39	20 June 2008	576,000 (4.9%)
