= Supermodelo 2006 =

- Season 2006
- Cast of Supermodelo 2006
- No. of episodes: 12

Release
- Original network: Cuatro
- Original release: August 27 – November 8, 2006

Season chronology
- Next → Season 2

Supermodelo 2006 was the first season of Supermodelo. The show took place live once every week, where a public vote decided which one of two nominated contestants would be eliminated from the competition, and the judges would nominate a new set of contestants for elimination. The period in between was pre-recorded, and tracked the progress of all the girls as they received lessons on various aspects of modeling, took part in photo shoot sessions and other fashion related challenges. The goal of the show was to find Spain's next representative in the Elite Model Look contest.

The winner of the competition was 19-year-old María José Gallego from Jaén.

== Episodes ==
=== Gala 1 ===
Originally aired: 27 August 2006

- Eliminated: Yurena Álvarez, Yrina Catalá, Ruth Tolín, Reyes Pagador, Paola Ditano, Kim Schmocker & Cristina Cervera
- Nominated for elimination: Mayte Prieto & Odilia Pamela

=== Gala 2 ===
Originally aired: 30 August 2006

- Eliminated: Odilia Pamela
- Nominated for elimination: Christel Castaño & Yanira Catalá

=== Gala 3 ===
Originally aired: 6 September 2006

- Eliminated: Christel Castaño
- Nominated for elimination: Cristina Palavra & Graciela Tallón

=== Gala 4 ===
Originally aired: 13 September 2006

- Eliminated: Cristina Palavra
- Nominated for elimination: Graciela Tallón & Yanira Catalá

=== Gala 5 ===
Originally aired: 20 September 2006

- Eliminated: Yanira Catalá
- Nominated for elimination: Elisabeth Kweku & Fina Rodrigo

=== Gala 6 ===
Originally aired: 27 September 2006

- Eliminated: Fina Rodrigo
- Nominated for elimination: None

=== Gala 7 ===
Originally aired: 4 October 2006

- Nominated for elimination: Laura Beigveder & Malena Costa

=== Gala 8 ===
Originally aired: 11 October 2006

- Eliminated: Laura Beigveder
- Nominated for elimination: Graciela Tallón & Malena Costa

=== Gala 9 ===
Originally aired: 18 October 2006

- Eliminated: Graciela Tallón
- Nominated for elimination: Laura Negrete & Malena Costa

=== Gala 10 ===
Originally aired: 25 October 2006

- Eliminated: Malena Costa
- Nominated for elimination: Elisabeth Kweku & Yasmín García

=== Gala 11 ===
Originally aired: 1 November 2006

- Eliminated: Elisabeth Kweku

=== Final ===
Originally aired: 8 November 2006

- 4th place: Laura Negrete
- 3rd place: Mayte Prieto
- Runner-up: Yasmín García
- Supermodelo 2006: María José Gallego

== Contestants ==
(ages stated are at start of contest)

Contestant	Age	Hometown	Outcome	Place
Odilia Pamela García	19	Sabadell	Episode 2	13
Christel Castaño	20	Barcelona	Episode 3	12
Cristina Palavra	19	Seville	Episode 4	11
Yanira Catalá	22	Calp	Episode 5	10
Fina Rodrigo	18	Llíria	Episode 6	9
Laura Beigveder	21	Fuenlabrada	Episode 8	8
Graciela Tallón	16	Perillo	Episode 9	7
Malena Costa	16	Mallorca	Episode 10	6
Elisabeth Kweku	19	Tenerife	Episode 11	5
Laura Negrete	17	Alicante	Episode 12	4
María Teresa "Mayte" Prieto	17	Madrid	Episode 12	3
Yasmín García	18	Tenerife	Episode 12	2
María José Gallego	19	Jaén	Episode 12	1

== Results ==
Place	Model	Galas											
Place	Model	1	2	3	4	5	6	7	8	9	10	11	12
1	María José	SAFE	SAFE	SAFE	SAFE	SAFE	SAFE	SAFE	SAFE	SAFE	SAFE	FINAL	WINNER
2	Yasmín	SAFE	SAFE	SAFE	SAFE	SAFE	SAFE	SAFE	SAFE	SAFE	NOM	FINAL	ELIM
3	Mayte	NOM	SAFE	SAFE	SAFE	SAFE	SAFE	SAFE	SAFE	SAFE	SAFE	FINAL	ELIM
4	Laura N.	SAFE	SAFE	SAFE	SAFE	SAFE	SAFE	SAFE	SAFE	NOM	SAFE	FINAL	ELIM
5	Elisabeth	SAFE	SAFE	SAFE	SAFE	NOM	SAFE	SAFE	SAFE	SAFE	NOM	ELIM	
6	Malena	SAFE	SAFE	SAFE	SAFE	SAFE	SAFE	NOM	NOM	NOM	ELIM		
7	Graciela	SAFE	SAFE	NOM	NOM	SAFE	SAFE	SAFE	NOM	ELIM			
8	Laura B.	SAFE	SAFE	SAFE	SAFE	SAFE	SAFE	NOM	ELIM				
9	Fina	SAFE	SAFE	SAFE	SAFE	NOM	ELIM						
10	Yanira	SAFE	NOM	SAFE	NOM	ELIM							
11	Cristina	SAFE	SAFE	NOM	ELIM								
12	Christel	SAFE	NOM	ELIM									
13	Odilia	NOM	ELIM										

SAFE The contestant was a candidate for nomination but was saved
NOM The contestant was nominated for elimination
ELIM The contestant was eliminated
FINAL The contestant advanced to the finale
WINNER The contestant won the competition

- In gala 1, the pool of girls was reduced to the final 13 who would move on to the main competition, before Mayte and Odilia were nominated for elimination.
- In gala 7, there was no elimination. All three of the girls who had been nominated for elimination on the previous gala were spared by Judit.
- In gala 12, the final results were based solely on the public vote.

== Judges and mentors ==
- Judit Mascó - host
- Antonia Dell'Atte - model & judge
- Moncho Moreno makeup artist & judge
- Paola Dominguín model & judge
- Cristina Rodríguez - stylist
- Emmanuel Rouzic - photographer
- Jesús Román Martínez - nutritionist
- Jimmy Roca - fitness coach
- Paula Galimbardi - acting coach
- Valerio Pino - runway coach

== Viewing figures ==
Episode	Air date	Viewers & Share
1	27 August 2006	1,102,000 (9.6%)
2	30 August 2006	1,108,000 (8.8%)
3	6 September 2006	1,377,000 (10.1%)
4	13 September 2006	1,100,000 (8.3%)
5	20 September 2006	1,033,000 (7.8%)
6	27 September 2006	1,122,000 (7.2%)
7	4 October 2006	976,000 (6.2%)
8	11 October 2006	926,000 (6.7%)
9	18 October 2006	1,164,000 (7.9%)
10	25 October 2006	1,347,000 (8.7%)
11	1 November 2006	1,270,000 (9.1%)
12	8 November 2006	1,604,000 (11.5%)
