= Live from City Hall =

Live From City Hall
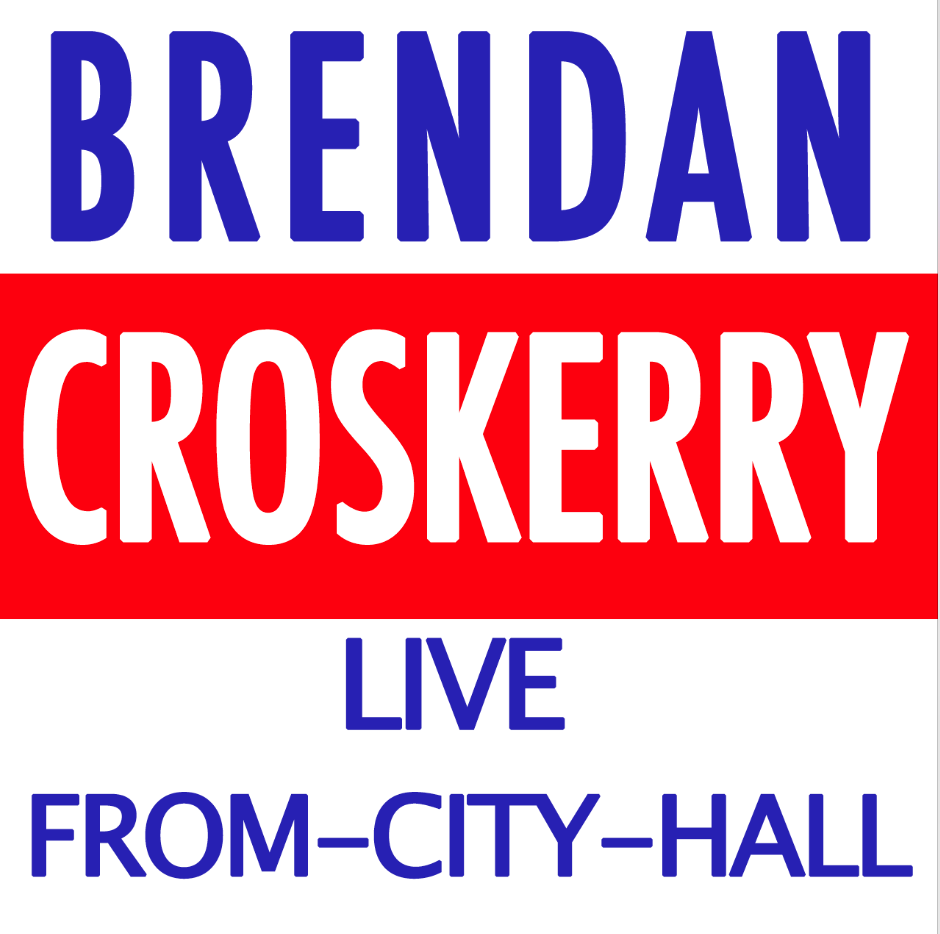
- Cover for the 2014 album by Brendan Croskerry

EP by Brendan Croskerry
- Released: November 18, 2014
- Recorded: Toronto, Canada (studio recording)
- Genre: Rock, pop
- Length: 12:33
- Label: Independent
- Producer: Dave Newfeld, Brendan Croskerry

Brendan Croskerry chronology
Live From City Hall (2014)	XK (2015)

Live From City Hall is the fourth release by singer-songwriter Brendan Croskerry and produced by Dave Newfeld (Broken Social Scene).

From 2013 to 2014, Brendan worked for Toronto Mayor Rob Ford as a special assistant and recorded a free E.P. titled Live from City Hall inspired by his time in the mayor's office. The promotional video for the EP included a behind-the-scenes look at the mayor's office moments after being stripped of power on November 18, 2013.

== Track listing ==
All tracks are written by Brendan Croskerry.

No.	Title	Length
1.	"Live from City Hall (Prelude)"	0:30
2.	"Live from City Hall"	4:02
3.	"Ghetto Gold"	4:05
4.	"Megacity"	4:02
Total length:		12:33
