= Carles Puyol =

Spanish footballer (born 1978)

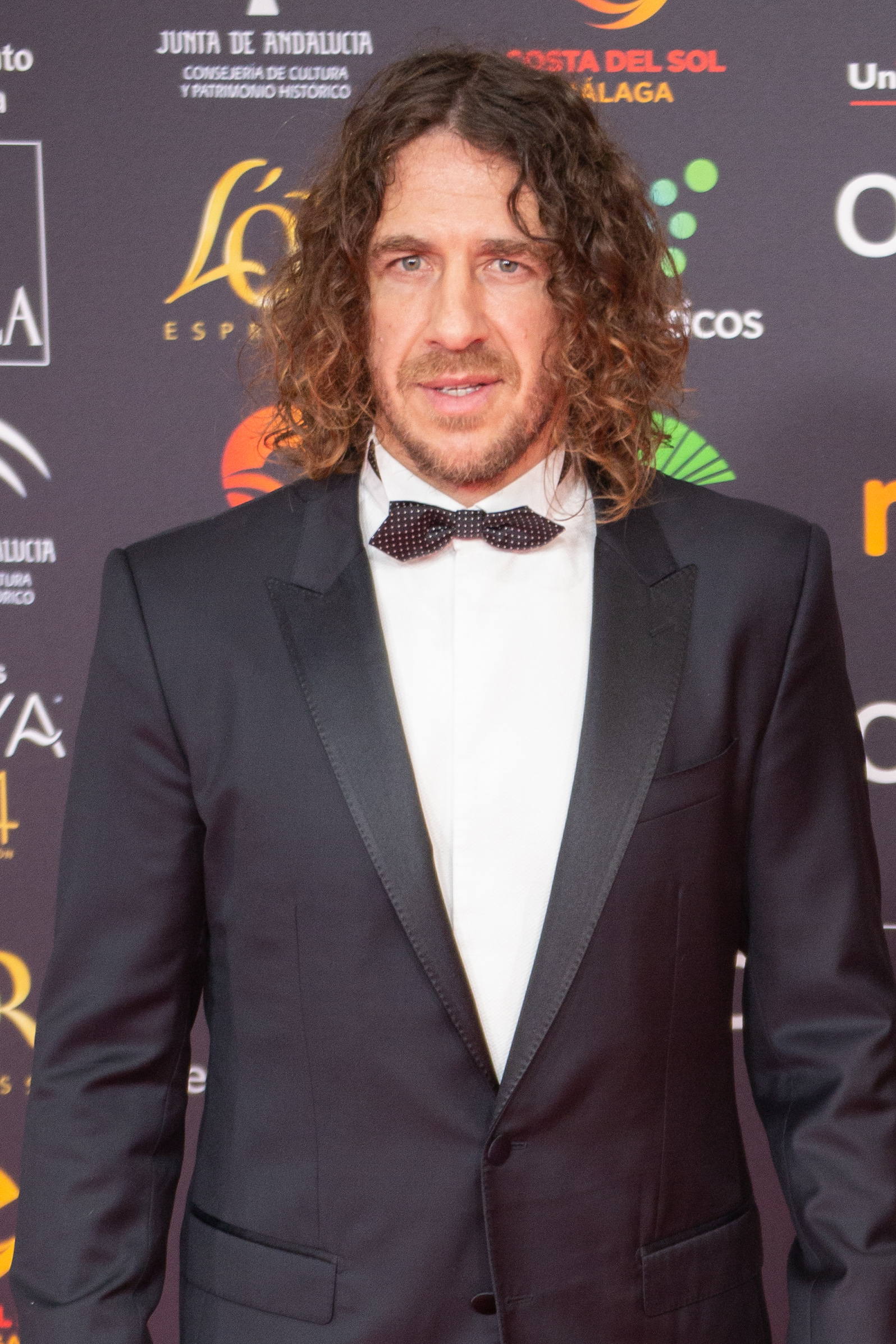
- Puyol at the 2020 Goya Awards

Personal information
- Full name: Carles Puyol Saforcada
- Date of birth: 13 April 1978 (age 48)
- Place of birth: La Pobla de Segur, Spain
- Height: 1.78 m (5 ft 10 in)
- Position: Centre-back

Youth career
- 1992–1995: Pobla de Segur
- 1995–1997: Barcelona

Senior career*
Years	Team	Apps	(Gls)
1996	Barcelona C	1	(0)
1997–1999	Barcelona B	89	(6)
1999–2014	Barcelona	392	(12)
Total		482	(19)

International career
1995	Spain U18	3	(0)
2000	Spain U21	4	(0)
2000	Spain U23	5	(0)
2000–2013	Spain	100	(3)
2001–2013	Catalonia	6	(0)
Medal record
Men's football
Representing Spain
FIFA World Cup
Winner	2010 South Africa
UEFA European Championship
Winner	2008 Austria–Switzerland
Summer Olympics
Silver medal – second place	2000 Sydney	Team
FIFA Confederations Cup
Third place	2009 South Africa
- * Club domestic league appearances and goals

Carles Puyol Saforcada (Catalan: [ˈkaɾləs puˈjɔl səfuɾˈkaðə], Spanish: [ˈkaɾles puˈʝol safoɾˈkaða]; born 13 April 1978) is a Spanish former professional footballer who played his entire career for Barcelona. Considered one of the best defenders ever and one of the sport's greatest captains, he mainly played as a centre-back, but could also play in either full-back position, mostly as a right-back.

Known for his defensive qualities and leadership, Puyol earned the nickname of "El Tiburón" ("The Shark") by teammates and fans. He was Barcelona's captain from August 2004 until his retirement in 2014 and appeared in 593 competitive matches for the club. He won 18 major club titles, including six La Liga trophies and three Champions Leagues.

Puyol won 100 caps for Spain, and was part of the squads that won Euro 2008 and the 2010 World Cup. In the 2010 World Cup semi-final, he scored the only goal of the game against Germany.

== Club career ==
Born in La Pobla de Segur, Lleida, Catalonia, Puyol started playing football for his hometown club as a goalkeeper, but after injury problems with his shoulder, he became a forward. He said that in his youth, "My parents were skeptical about me becoming a footballer and encouraged me to study". In 1995, he joined FC Barcelona's youth system at La Masia, switching positions again to play as a defensive midfielder. Two years later, he started playing for the club's B-team, occupying the position of right-back.

In 1998, Barcelona accepted an offer from Málaga to sell Puyol, who was behind Frank de Boer and Michael Reiziger in the pecking order. However, he refused to leave after seeing his best friend Xavi make his first-team debut.

Louis van Gaal promoted Puyol to the first team the following year, and he made his La Liga debut on 2 October 1999 in a 2–0 away win against Real Valladolid. After that he successfully made another conversion, to central defender. During the 2003 off-season, as Barcelona was immersed in a financial crisis, Manchester United showed interest in signing Puyol, but no move ever materialised. Two years later, he extended his contract for a further five seasons.

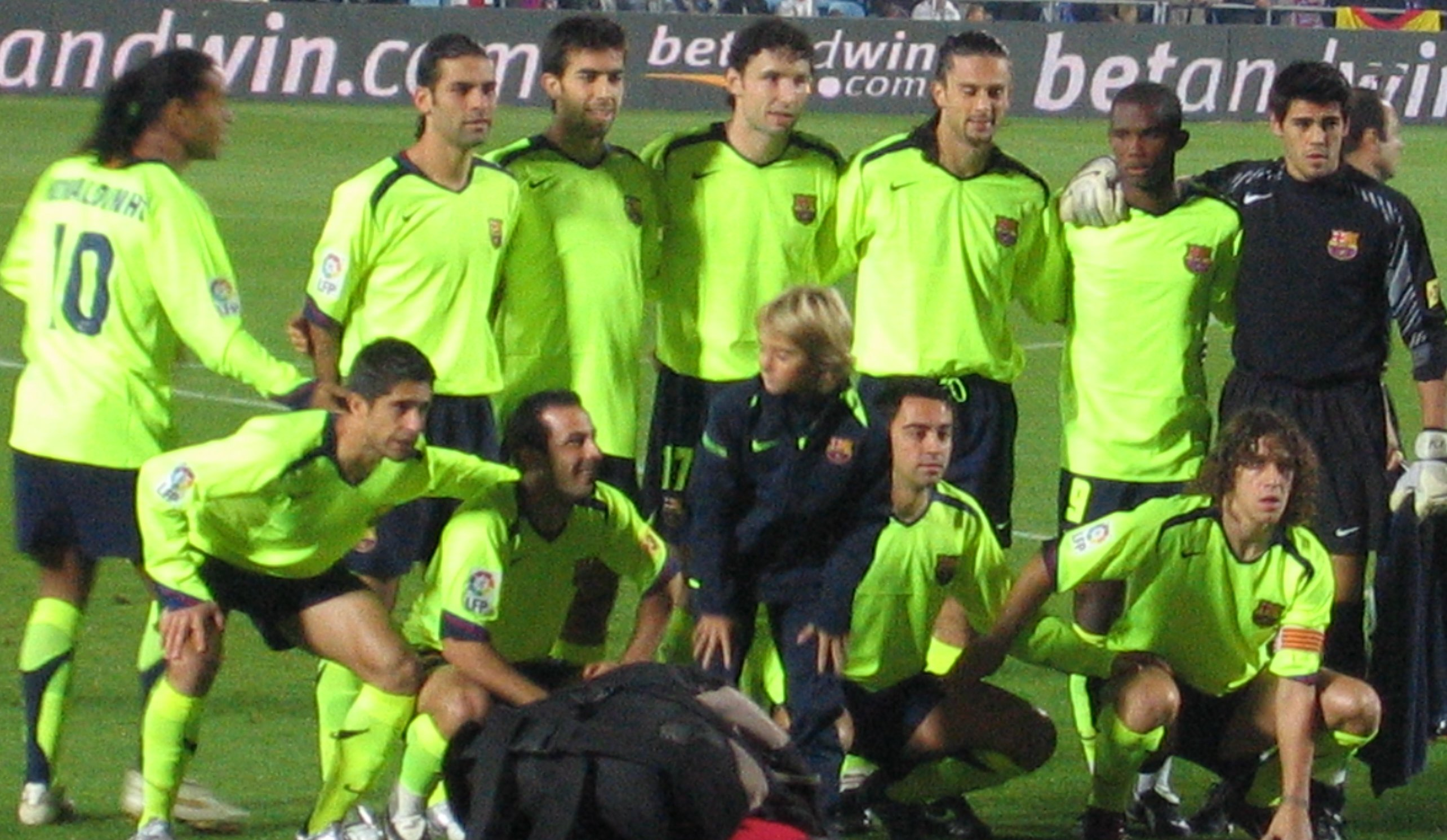
Puyol (downright) lining up for Barcelona, alongside Ronaldinho, Rafael Márquez, Xavi and Samuel Eto'o in 2005

Puyol was named club captain at the end of 2003–04, after the retirement of Luis Enrique. He continued to be a defensive cornerstone for Barça, being awarded the "Best European right-back" award by UEFA in 2002 (amongst other individual accolades), and helped the Spaniards win two consecutive league titles. In 2005–06 he appeared in a total of 52 games, including 12 in that season's UEFA Champions League which ended in victory against Arsenal, the club's second European Cup.

On 16 September 2008, Puyol made his 400th appearance for Barcelona in a Champions League group stage match against Sporting CP. In the league season, despite injury problems, he appeared in 28 matches and helped them win another league title. His only goal came against Real Madrid in El Clásico at the Santiago Bernabéu on 2 May 2009 which finished with a resounding 6–2 win, and he celebrated his goal by kissing his Catalan flag captain's armband in front of the incensed Madrid fans. He was essential to the team also winning the 2009 Copa del Rey, the 2009 Champions League, the 2009 UEFA Super Cup and the 2009 FIFA Club World Cup to complete an unprecedented sextuple, appearing in nearly 100 official matches.

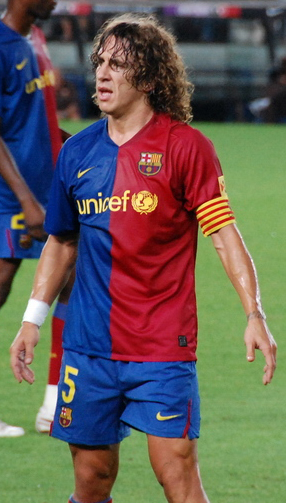
Puyol as Barcelona captain (wearing his Catalan flag armband) in 2008

On 13 November 2010, Puyol played his 500th game in all competitions for Barcelona in a domestic league match against Villarreal. He struggled again with injuries during the 2010–11 campaign, but still appeared in 28 matches, again winning the league and the Champions League. He played the final six minutes in the Champions League final, a 3–1 victory over Manchester United at the Wembley Stadium.

After the defeat to Inter Milan in the 2009–10 Champions League semi-final, Puyol played in 56 matches for Barcelona without losing, a run that only ended on 11 January 2012 at Osasuna (2–3 loss). He also scored two goals in the season's Copa del Rey, against Real Madrid and Valencia.

On 2 October 2012, in the late stages of a Champions League group stage encounter at Benfica, his first game upon recovering from a knee ligament injury suffered against Getafe, Puyol dislocated his elbow after landing awkwardly in a corner kick challenge. He was initially expected to be sidelined for two months but fully recovered in one. On 18 December Barcelona renewed his contract, extending it until 30 June 2016. In June of the following year he again underwent surgery on his right knee, his sixth operation as a professional, which led to thoughts of early retirement.

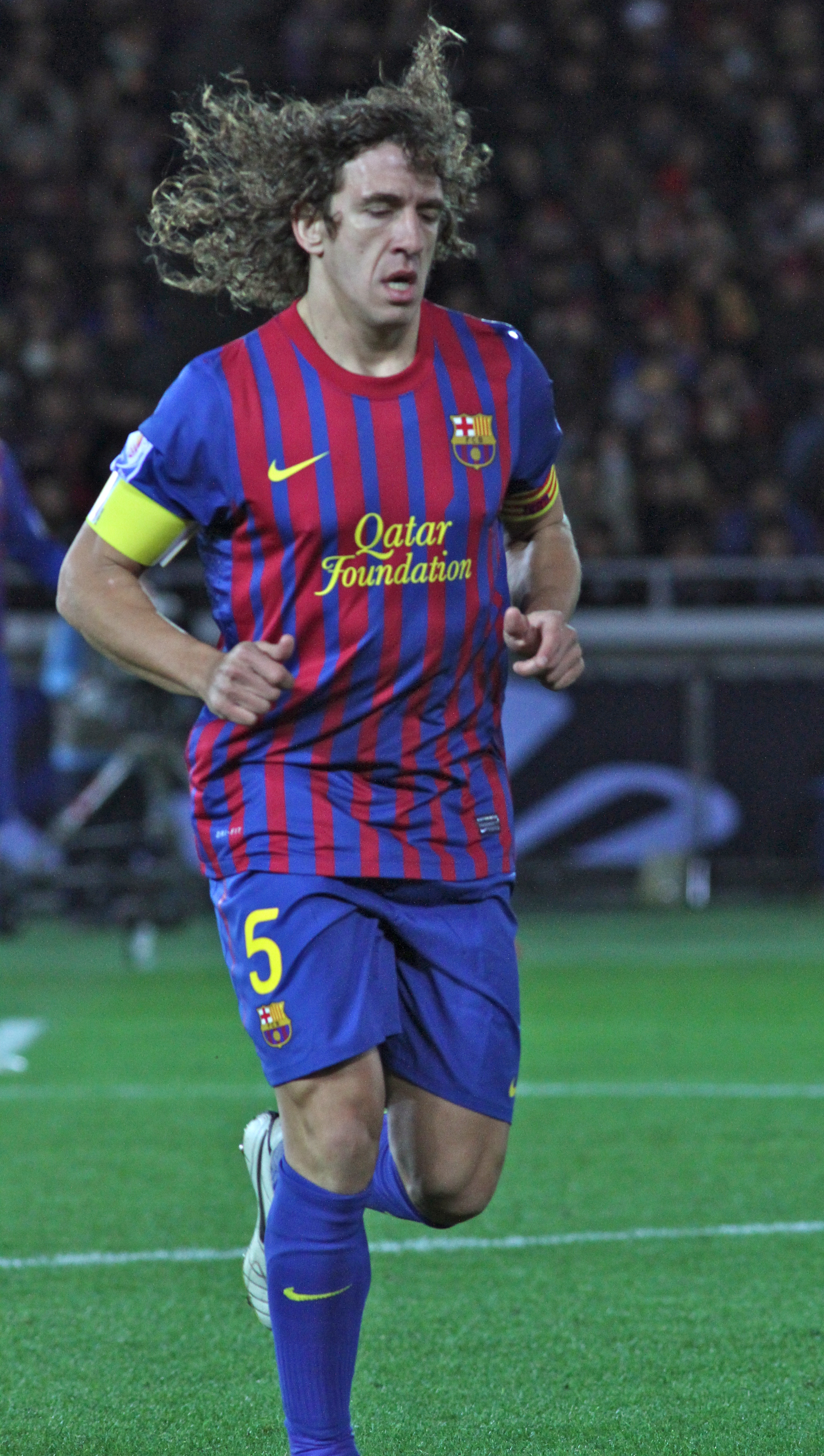
Puyol playing for Barcelona in 2011

On 2 March 2014, Puyol surpassed Migueli to go second in Barça's all-time league appearances table, behind only Xavi, and scored the third goal in a 4–1 home win against Almería. Two days later, although he still had two more years in his contract, he announced that he would leave Barcelona at the end of the season. He said "After my last two major operations, I find it is taking me a lot of effort to reach the level required here, even more than myself and the surgeons thought necessary. That's the reason I have reached this decision".

Barcelona bid farewell to Puyol on 15 May 2014, after a fifteen-year career in the first team (ten as captain) that brought him 21 titles. At a packed Auditori 1899, his teammates, ex-teammates, presidents and coaches paid tribute to him, and he said "I’ve lived the dream of so many young kids, doing what I most enjoy in life, playing football and training". He announced his retirement shortly after at the age of 36 but stayed with his only club; he was immediately appointed director of football Andoni Zubizarreta's assistant. He resigned in January 2015, shortly after Zubizarreta was fired.

In September 2019, Puyol rejected an offer to become Barcelona's sporting director.

== International career ==
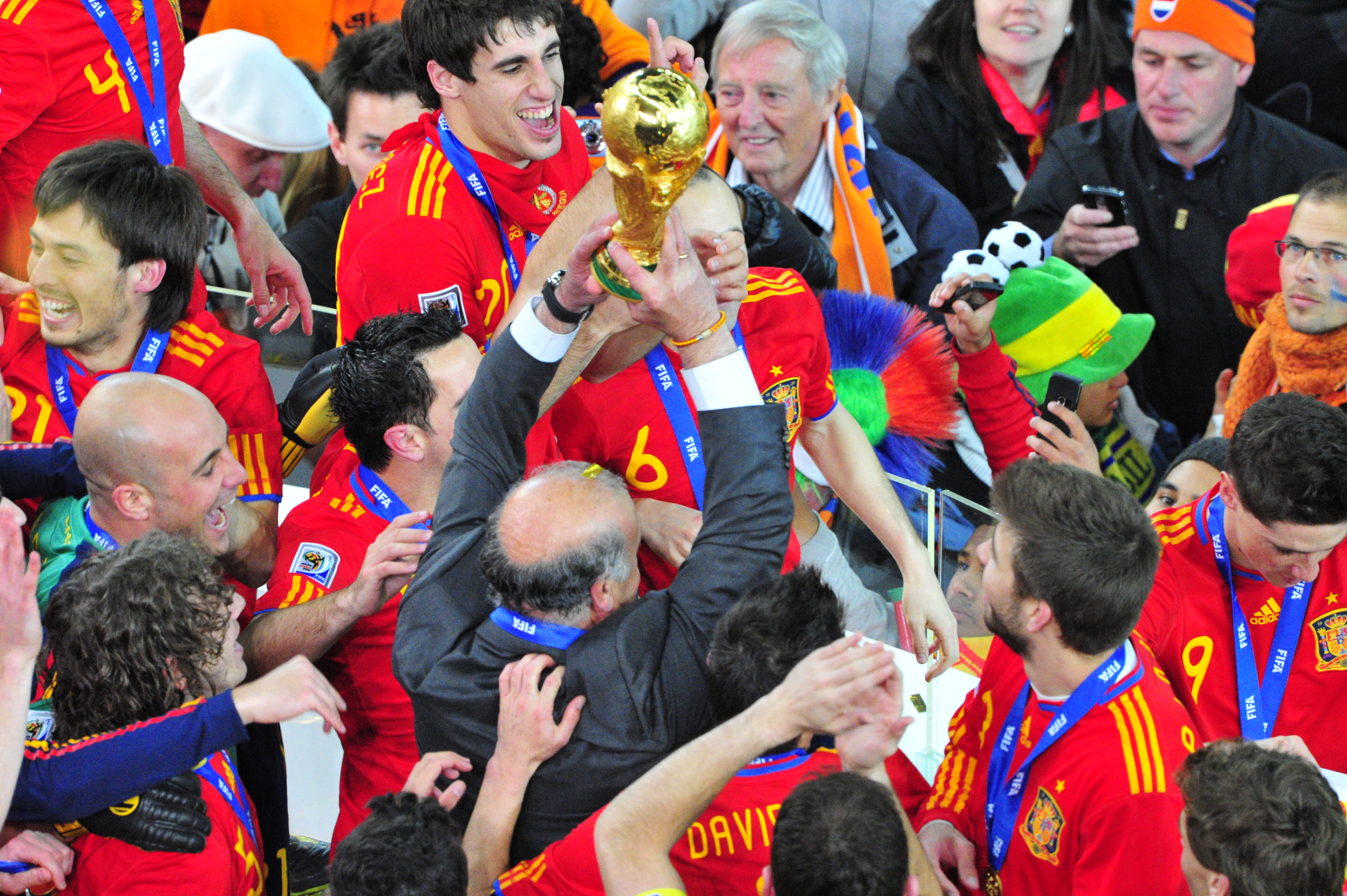
Puyol (bottom left) celebrating with Spain after their 2010 World Cup win

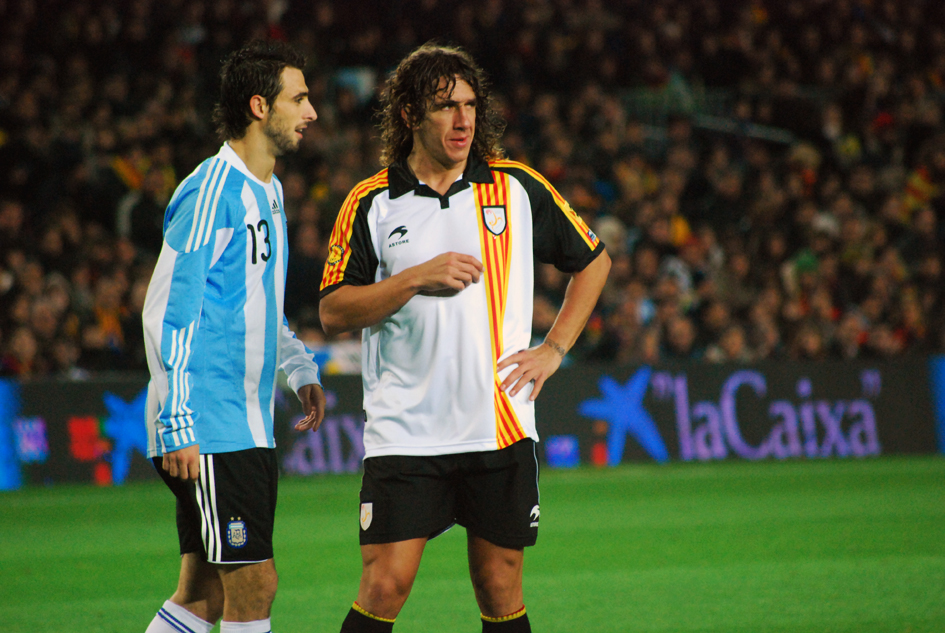
Puyol playing for Catalonia in a 2009 friendly match against Argentina at Camp Nou

Puyol debuted for the Spanish senior squad on 15 November 2000 against the Netherlands, and remained a regular fixture in the following years. He played for his country at the 2000 Olympics, 2002 World Cup, Euro 2004, 2006 World Cup, Euro 2008, 2009 FIFA Confederations Cup and the 2010 World Cup.

During the 2002 World Cup, Puyol scored an own goal in the 3–1 victory over Paraguay in the group stages. In the round of 16 tie against Ireland, he assisted Fernando Morientes; following a 1–1 deadlock after extra-time, his team prevailed following a 3–2 penalty shoot-out victory. Spain were eliminated in the quarter-finals of the competition by co-hosts South Korea, after a 5–3 shoot-out defeat.

Puyol started every game except one at Euro 2008, and Spain's defence only conceded two goals in his five games. They won the final against Germany, and he was named in the Team of the Tournament alongside his defensive partner, Carlos Marchena of Valencia. He started in three out of five matches at the 2009 FIFA Confederations Cup, and acted as captain when Iker Casillas was rested for the last group stage fixture; they finished third, and he was included in the Team of the Tournament with four of his teammates.

In the 2010 World Cup in South Africa, Puyol started every match and played almost every minute (he was replaced by Marchena in the 84th minute of the quarter-final against Paraguay). He scored the only goal in the semi-final with Germany, a powerful header from a corner taken by Barcelona teammate Xavi, which sent the national team through to their first World Cup final. In the final, he featured for the full 120 minutes as the side defeated the Netherlands 1–0 in extra time. Spain only conceded two goals throughout the tournament – none of which came in the knock-out stages – also keeping five clean sheets, a record for a World Cup-winning team, shared with the 2006 Italy side and 1998 champions France. He also completed 88% of his passes, the third–highest completion rate of any player in the competition alongside his teammate Sergio Busquets, and was named to the team of the tournament for his performances.

On 1 August 2010, aged 32, Puyol announced that he would continue to represent the national team for at least another two years. He missed Spain's victorious Euro 2012 campaign due to a knee injury sustained in a league game against Espanyol in early May, which required surgery and five to six weeks' recuperation. The following year, he was ruled out of the Confederations Cup, once again due to physical problems.

Puyol played his 100th and final international game on 6 February 2013, captaining Spain to a 3–1 friendly victory over Uruguay in Doha, Qatar.

== Style of play ==
"Puyol is the key, not just because he is one of the best defenders in the world but because of his character. He never lets up."

— Xavi

Puyol is regarded as one of the best defenders and captains of all time. Mainly a central defender, he was a versatile player who could also feature on either flank, mostly as a right-back, in particular in the first part of his career. He also initially played as a defensive midfielder in his early career, and had previously even been deployed as goalkeeper and striker in his youth.

Described as a "no–nonsense" player, Puyol was known for his commanding presence in the air despite his modest stature, as well as his ability to read the game, and his intense commitment and ruggedness as a defender, in particular when challenging for the ball. According to Barcelona's head doctor, he was "the strongest, who has the quickest reactions, and who has the most explosive strength". In 2006, Simon Talbot of The Guardian described Puyol as: "Barcelona's very own Captain Caveman, playing football with his heart on his sleeve and his hair in his eyes, throwing himself about the pitch and launching wholeheartedly into kamikaze tackles like a hyperactive, lunatic kid." Club fans referred to him as "The Wall".

Puyol was also known for his leadership and work ethic. He often continued training alone after the end of a team practice session or on days off. He said in 2010, "I don't have Romário's technique, [Marc] Overmars' pace or [Patrick] Kluivert's strength. But I work harder than the others. I'm like the student who is not as clever, but revises for his exams and does OK in the end." Although his positioning, leadership and ability to organise his defence were initially cited as weaknesses early on in his career, he worked to improve on these aspects of his game throughout his time with Barcelona. Indeed, Miguel Ángel Nadal, who played with him for a short period of time, later said, "Carles plays with maturity, has great positional sense, and above all, has pride in his shirt". A physical yet fair player, he was also known for his anticipation, strength, aggression, determination, discipline, intelligence and concentration as a defender, as well as his man-marking skills and ability to organise his defence; he also excelled in one on one situations.

Fellow defender Gerard Piqué said: "He's someone who, even if you're winning 3–0 and there's a few seconds left in the game will shout at the top of his voice at you if he thinks your concentration is going." A former team-mate said, "Even four goals down he thinks we can still win", and another described him as "a pain in the arse", but added "that's exactly what we need".

Although Puyol was predominantly known for his defensive skills, and albeit not being as talented or naturally gifted as other players who also came out of Barcelona's youth system, he possessed solid technique, and was also known for his composure on the ball as well as his passing ability, despite tending to favour safer or simpler passes rather than riskier ones when playing out from the back. As such, throughout his career, he was often deployed alongside a ball-playing centre-back such as Piqué; together, they formed an effective central-defensive partnership, both with Barcelona and Spain, with the former's physical defending complementing the latter's more elegant playing style.

In his youth, Puyol was also known to be a quick and energetic right-sided defender, who had a penchant for getting forward as well as chasing down his opponents; however, he lost his pace with age. This became particularly noticeable in his later career, when he was usually deployed in the centre, in part due to a series of recurring knee injuries, which limited his playing time and affected his physical condition, eventually forcing him to retire prematurely.

== Personal life ==
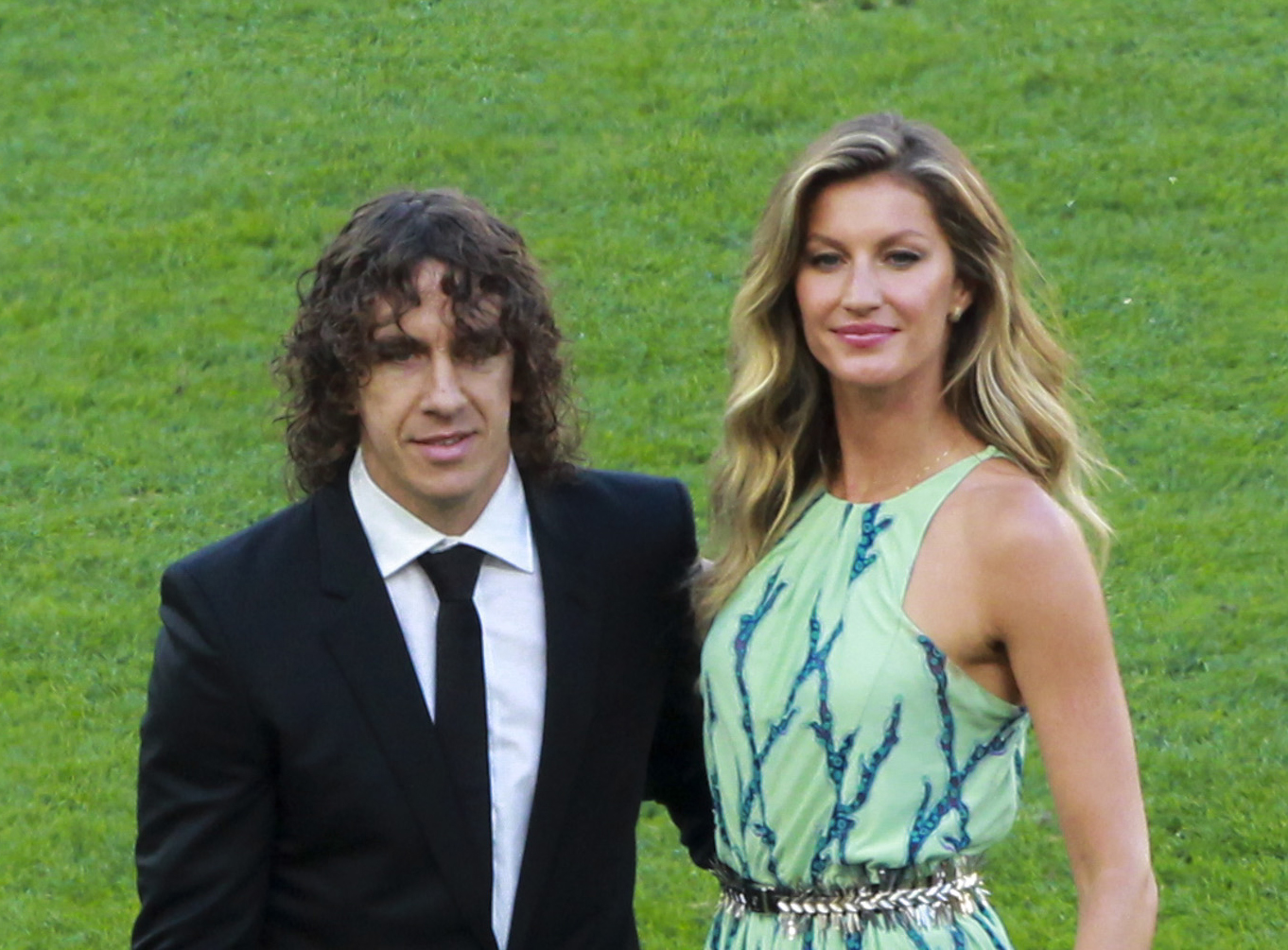
Puyol at the 2014 FIFA World Cup Final, alongside supermodel Gisele Bündchen

Puyol's long shaggy hair was a distinctive feature throughout his career. Barcelona manager Van Gaal suggested he get it cut when the player was 19, immediately after his first training session with the senior players. Van Gaal asked him in his office, "What's your problem, can't you afford the money for a haircut?". Puyol recalled: "I said nothing, and to this day have kept my hair as it is."

In 2006, Puyol said that when not working, he leads "a very quiet life... I've not been to a nightclub in Barcelona for years either. When I go out, I stay in a restaurant with my friends."

Puyol's father, Josep, died in a farming accident in late 2006 while Carles was on his way to play a match against Deportivo de La Coruña. He was informed of the news by coach Frank Rijkaard upon landing. He said that this, combined with an injury led to a dark period, with Spain national team physio Raúl Martínez eventually coming to Barcelona: in the player's words, "...[he] gave me a great telling off. He made me react, and I began to try to be more cheerful, and not overwhelmed by it all."

In March 2009, Puyol told Goal.com: "I do not like to go out much, although it is good to disconnect and I like to read." In September 2010, he started a relationship with model Malena Costa. In October of that year, he scored through a header in a 2–1 home win against Valencia CF and dedicated the goal to her by making a heart symbol with both hands. After the game, he said: "I dedicate the goal to my girlfriend."

In 2011, Puyol paid €30,000 for specialist private treatment for Miki Roqué, a footballer from his home province who was suffering from pelvic cancer. Roqué died in 2012.

Puyol started a relationship with Vanesa Lorenzo in 2012. The couple has two daughters, Manuela (born 2014) and María (2016).

Puyol was invited by Iranian television channel IRIB TV3 to provide commentary on the 2018 FIFA World Cup match between Iran and Spain on 20 June in a programme hosted by Adel Ferdosipour but was not allowed in the studio. According to news website Entekhab, the former player said that he had been told by the Islamic Republic of Iran Broadcasting that he could not appear in the programme "because of his looks (long hair)"; the veteran channel director had been replaced by one closer to Iran's ultra-religious hardliners weeks before, and this incident ultimately led to some ridicule within Iran on Twitter.

== Career statistics ==
=== Club ===
Appearances and goals by club, season and competition
Club	Season	League			Copa del Rey		Europe		Other		Total	
Club	Season	Division	Apps	Goals	Apps	Goals	Apps	Goals	Apps	Goals	Apps	Goals
Barcelona C	1995–96	Segunda División B	1	0	—		—		—		1	0
Barcelona B	1996–97	Segunda División	1	1	—		—		—		1	1
Barcelona B	1997–98	Segunda División B	42	3	—		—		—		42	3
Barcelona B	1998–99	Segunda División	38	2	—		—		—		38	2
Barcelona B	1999–2000	Segunda División B	8	0	—		—		—		8	0
Barcelona B	Total		89	6	—		—		—		89	6
Barcelona	1999–2000	La Liga	24	0	5	0	8 (Note: Appearances in UEFA Champions League)	0	0	0	37	0
Barcelona	2000–01	La Liga	17	0	2	0	5 (Note: Three appearances in UEFA Champions League, two appearances in UEFA Cup)	0	—		24	0
Barcelona	2001–02	La Liga	35	2	1	0	15	0	—		51	2
Barcelona	2002–03	La Liga	32	0	0	0	14	0	—		46	0
Barcelona	2003–04	La Liga	27	0	4	0	7 (Note: Appearances in UEFA Cup)	0	—		38	0
Barcelona	2004–05	La Liga	36	0	1	0	8	0	—		45	0
Barcelona	2005–06	La Liga	35	1	3	0	12	0	2 (Note: Appearances in Supercopa de España)	0	52	1
Barcelona	2006–07	La Liga	35	2	7	0	9 (Note: One appearance in UEFA Super Cup, eight appearances and one goal in UEFA Champions League)	1	4 (Note: Two appearances in Supercopa de España, two appearances in FIFA Club World Cup)	0	55	2
Barcelona	2007–08	La Liga	30	0	7	0	10	1	—		47	1
Barcelona	2008–09	La Liga	28	1	6	0	11	0	—		45	1
Barcelona	2009–10	La Liga	32	1	2	0	10 (Note: One appearance in UEFA Super Cup, eight appearances and one goal in UEFA Champions League)	0	4 (Note: Two appearances in Supercopa de España, two appearances in FIFA Club World Cup)	0	48	1
Barcelona	2010–11	La Liga	17	1	2	0	8	0	0	0	27	1
Barcelona	2011–12	La Liga	26	3	7	2	9	0	2 (Note: Appearances in FIFA Club World Cup)	0	44	5
Barcelona	2012–13	La Liga	13	1	5	1	4	0	0	0	22	2
Barcelona	2013–14	La Liga	5	1	6	1	1	0	0	0	12	2
Barcelona	Total		392	13	58	4	131	2	12	0	593	18
Career totals			482	19	58	4	131	2	12	0	683	24

=== International ===
Appearances and goals by national team and year
National team	Year	Apps	Goals
Spain	2000	1	0
Spain	2001	4	0
Spain	2002	10	1
Spain	2003	8	0
Spain	2004	10	0
Spain	2005	10	0
Spain	2006	10	0
Spain	2007	5	0
Spain	2008	14	1
Spain	2009	8	0
Spain	2010	14	1
Spain	2011	4	0
Spain	2012	1	0
Spain	2013	1	0
Total		100	3

Scores and results list Spain's goal tally first, score column indicates score after each Puyol goal.

List of international goals scored by Carles Puyol
No.	Date	Venue	Opponent	Score	Result	Competition
1	17 April 2002	Windsor Park, Belfast, Northern Ireland	Northern Ireland	4–0	5–0	Friendly
2	11 October 2008	A. Le Coq Arena, Tallinn, Estonia	Estonia	3–0	3–0	2010 FIFA World Cup qualification
3	7 July 2010	Moses Mabhida, Durban, South Africa	Germany	1–0	1–0	2010 FIFA World Cup

== Honours ==
Barcelona

- La Liga: 2004–05, 2005–06, 2008–09, 2009–10, 2010–11, 2012–13
- Copa del Rey: 2008–09, 2011–12
- Supercopa de España: 2005, 2006, 2009, 2010
- UEFA Champions League: 2005–06, 2008–09, 2010–11
- UEFA Super Cup: 2009
- FIFA Club World Cup: 2009, 2011

Spain U23

- Olympic Silver Medal: 2000

Spain

- FIFA World Cup: 2010
- UEFA European Championship: 2008

Individual

- La Liga Breakthrough Player of the Year: 2001
- ESM Team of the Year: 2001–02, 2002–03, 2004–05, 2005–06
- UEFA Team of the Year: 2002, 2005, 2006, 2008, 2009, 2010
- UEFA Club Best Defender: 2006
- FIFA/FIFPro World XI: 2007, 2008, 2010
- UEFA European Championship Team of the Tournament: 2008
- FIFA Confederations Cup Team of the Tournament: 2009
- FIFA World Cup All-Star Team: 2010
- FIFA World Cup Dream Team: 2010
- BBVA Fair Play award: 2011–12
- UEFA Ultimate Team of the Year (published 2015)
- World XI: Team of the 21st Century
- UEFA Euro All-time XI (published 2016)
- Golden Foot: 2016, as football legend
- One Club Man Award: 2018
- Barça Players' Award: 2013–14

Decorations

- Prince of Asturias Awards: 2010
- Gold Medal of the Royal Order of Sporting Merit: 2011

== See also ==
- List of footballers with 100 or more UEFA Champions League appearances
- List of men's footballers with 100 or more international caps
- List of one-club men in association football

Sporting positions
Preceded by Luis Enrique	FC Barcelona captain 2004–2014	Succeeded by Xavi

Awards
Preceded by John Terry	UEFA Champions League Best Defender; 2005–06	Succeeded by Paolo Maldini
