= Supermodelo 2007 =

- Season 2007
- Cast of Supermodelo 2007
- No. of episodes: 14

Release
- Original network: Cuatro
- Original release: August 13 – November 26, 2007

Season chronology
- ← Previous; Season 1 Next → Season 3

Supermodelo 2007 was the second season of Supermodelo. Due to the success of the previous season the number of contestants was increased from 13 to 20 girls. The show took place live once every week, where a public vote decided which one of two nominated contestants would be eliminated from the competition, and the judges would nominate a new set of contestants for elimination. The period in between was pre-recorded, and tracked the progress of all the girls as they received lessons on various aspects of modeling, took part in photo shoot sessions and other fashion related challenges. The goal of the show was to find Spain's next representative in the Elite Model Look contest.

The winner of the competition was 21-year-old Noelia López from Seville.

== Episodes ==
=== Castings ===
Originally aired: 13–17 August 2007

Prior to the beginning of the main competition, a short series of 22-minute segments following the castings aired twice a day from Monday through friday beginning on 13 August.

=== Gala 1 ===
Originally aired: 27 August 2007

Lisa, Janire, Gracia and Dabryna were eliminated from the competition, leaving sixteen girls standing. The remaining girls had a casting for Custo Barcelona, where Isabel and Marta V. were selected to attend one of his shows in New York City. At the end of the week, Magdalena and Irene were nominated for elimination.

- Eliminated: Lisa Charlotte, Janire Alejos, Gracia de Torres & Dabryna Sedeno
- Nominated for elimination: Irene Valerón & Magdalena Pérez

=== Gala 2 ===
Originally aired: 3 September 2007

Irene was chosen by the public as the first contestant to be eliminated from the competition. The remaining models had to face a second round of nominations, but only after taking part in a summer-themed runway show. The final test was a bridal runway show where the girls had to wear designs by Rosa Clará. Sandra and Paola were nominated for elimination.

- Eliminated: Irene Valerón
- Nominated for elimination: Paola Ditano & Sandra Girón

=== Gala 3 ===
Originally aired: 10 September 2007

- Eliminated: Paola Ditano
- Nominated for elimination: Marta Abarrategui & Raquel Hernández

=== Gala 4 ===
Originally aired: 17 September 2007

- Eliminated: Raquel Hernández
- Nominated for elimination: Marta Abarrategui & Sandra Girón

=== Gala 5 ===
Originally aired: 24 September 2007

- Eliminated: Marta Abbarategui
- Nominated for elimination: Magdalena Pérez & Sandra Girón

=== Gala 6 ===
Originally aired: 1 October 2007

- Eliminated: Sandra Girón
- Nominated for elimination: Jessica Ruíz & Marta Vicente

=== Gala 7 ===
Originally aired: 8 October 2007

- Eliminated: Jessica Ruíz
- Nominated for elimination: Marta Vicente & Paloma Bloyd

=== Gala 8 ===
Originally aired: 15 October 2007

- Quit: Marta Vicente
- Nominated for elimination: Silvia Salleras & Zaida Rodríguez

=== Gala 9 ===
Originally aired: 22 October 2007

- Eliminated: Silvia Salleras
- Nominated for elimination: Paula Hidalgo & Zaida Rodríguez

=== Gala 10 ===
Originally aired: 29 October 2007

- Eliminated: Paula Hidalgo
- Nominated for elimination: Magdalena Pérez & Paula Bernaldez

=== Gala 11 ===
Originally aired: 5 November 2007

- Eliminated: Paula Bernaldez
- Nominated for elimination: Paloma Bloyd & Zaida Rodríguez

=== Gala 12 ===
Originally aired: 12 November 2007

- Quit: Zaida Rodríguez
- Finalist: Noelia López
- Nominated for the final: Alba Carrillo & Isabel Cañete
- Nominated for elimination: Magdalena Pérez & Paloma Bloyd

=== Semifinal ===
Originally aired: 19 November 2007

- Immune: Noelia López
- Finalist: Isabel Cañete
- Eligible for elimination: Alba Carrillo, Magdalena Pérez & Paloma Bloyd
- Eliminated: Paloma Bloyd

=== Final ===
Originally aired: 26 November 2007

- 4th place: Alba Carrillo
- 3rd place: Isabel Cañete
- Runner-up: Magdalena Pérez
- Supermodelo 2007: Noelia López

== Contestants ==
(ages stated are at start of contest)

Contestant	Age	Hometown	Finish	Place
Lisa Charlotte	18	Mallorca	Episode 1	20-17
Janire Alejos	18	Bilbao	Episode 1	20-17
Gracia de Torres	19	Almería	Episode 1	20-17
Dabryna Sedeno	24	Tenerife	Episode 1	20-17
Irene Valerón	20	Las Palmas	Episode 2	16
Paola Ditano	17	Santiago de Compostela	Episode 3	15
Raquel Hernández	23	Madrid	Episode 4	14
Marta Abarrategui	16	Madrid	Episode 5	13
Sandra Girón	18	Seville	Episode 6	12
Jessica Ruíz	19	Catalonia	Episode 7	11
Marta Vicente	16	Oviedo	Episode 8	10 (quit)
Silvia Salleras	17	Málaga	Episode 9	9
Paula Hidalgo	16	Seville	Episode 10	8
Paula Bernaldez	17	Valencia	Episode 11	7
Zaida Rodríguez	19	Gran Canaria	Episode 12	6 (quit)
Paloma Bloyd	19	Gijón	Episode 13	5
Alba Carrillo	20	Madrid	Episode 14	4-2
Isabel Cañete	18	Córdoba	Episode 14	4-2
Magdalena Pérez Bernal	20	Murcia	Episode 14	4-2
Noelia López	21	Seville	Episode 14	1

== Results ==
Place	Model	Galas													
Place	Model	1	2	3	4	5	6	7	8	9	10	11	12	13	14
1	Noelia	SAFE	SAFE	SAFE	SAFE	SAFE	SAFE	SAFE	SAFE	SAFE	SAFE	SAFE	FINAL	IMM	WINNER
2	Magdalena	NOM	SAFE	SAFE	SAFE	NOM	SAFE	SAFE	SAFE	SAFE	NOM	SAFE	NOM	FINAL	ELIM
3	Isabel	SAFE	SAFE	SAFE	SAFE	SAFE	SAFE	SAFE	SAFE	SAFE	SAFE	SAFE	NOM	FINAL	ELIM
4	Alba	SAFE	SAFE	SAFE	SAFE	SAFE	SAFE	SAFE	SAFE	SAFE	SAFE	SAFE	NOM	FINAL	ELIM
5	Paloma	SAFE	SAFE	SAFE	SAFE	SAFE	SAFE	NOM	SAFE	SAFE	SAFE	NOM	NOM	ELIM	
6	Zaida	SAFE	SAFE	SAFE	SAFE	SAFE	SAFE	SAFE	NOM	NOM	SAFE	NOM	QUIT		
7	Paula B.	SAFE	SAFE	SAFE	SAFE	SAFE	SAFE	SAFE	SAFE	SAFE	NOM	ELIM			
8	Paula H.	SAFE	SAFE	SAFE	SAFE	SAFE	SAFE	SAFE	SAFE	NOM	ELIM				
9	Silvia	SAFE	SAFE	SAFE	SAFE	SAFE	SAFE	SAFE	NOM	ELIM					
10	Marta V.	SAFE	SAFE	SAFE	SAFE	SAFE	NOM	NOM	QUIT						
11	Jessica	SAFE	SAFE	SAFE	SAFE	SAFE	NOM	ELIM							
12	Sandra	SAFE	NOM	SAFE	NOM	NOM	ELIM								
13	Marta A.	SAFE	SAFE	NOM	NOM	ELIM									
14	Raquel	SAFE	SAFE	NOM	ELIM										
15	Paola	SAFE	NOM	ELIM											
16	Irene	NOM	ELIM												

ELIM The contestant was eliminated
SAFE The contestant was a candidate for nomination but was saved
NOM The contestant was nominated for elimination
QUIT The contestant quit the competition
FINAL The contestant advanced to the finale
NOM The contestant was nominated for a place in the final
IMMUNE The contestant was exempt from elimination
WINNER The contestant won the competition

- In gala 1, Lisa, Janire, Gracia and Dabryna were eliminated by the judging panel before nominating Irene and Magdalena for elimination by the public.
- In gala 8, Marta V. quit the competition, automatically saving Paloma from elimination.
- In gala 12, Zaida quit the competition, automatically saving Paloma from elimination. It was later revealed that Zaida would have been eliminated regardless of her decision to quit. Noelia was selected by the contestants to advance to the final. Alba and Isabel were nominated by the judges for one of the three remaining spots in the final. This left Magdalena and Paloma in danger of elimination.
- In gala 13, Isabel was selected to advance to the final by the public, which left Alba in danger of elimination along with Magdalena and Paloma. The contestant with the fewest votes was Paloma, and she was eliminated as a result.

== Judges and mentors ==
- Judit Mascó - host
- Daniel El Kum - stylist & judge
- Manuel Batista - stylist & judge
- Vicky Martín Berrocal - designer & judge
- Cristina Rodríguez - stylist
- Emmanuel Rouzic - photographer
- Javier Martínez - nutritionist
- Jimmy Roca - fitness coach
- Marta Romero - acting coach
- Rubén Nsue - dancing instructor
- Valerio Pino- runway coach

== Viewing figures ==
Episode	Air date	Viewers & share
1	27 August 2007	1,131,000 (9.7%)
2	3 September 2007	1,210,000 (9.6%)
3	10 September 2007	1,154,000 (8.6%)
4	17 September 2007	1,046,000 (7.7%)
5	24 September 2007	1,092,000 (7.9%)
6	1 October 2007	985,000 (7.0%)
7	8 October 2007	1,110,000 (7.9%)
8	15 October 2007	1,014,000 (7.1%)
9	22 October 2007	1,003,000 (7.5%)
10	29 October 2007	997,000 (7.3%)
11	5 November 2007	904,000 (6.4%)
12	12 November 2007	1,055,000 (7.6%)
13	19 November 2007	1,115,000 (7.9%)
14	26 November 2007	1,194,000 (9.3%)
