= Brendan Croskerry =

Canadian singer-songwriter

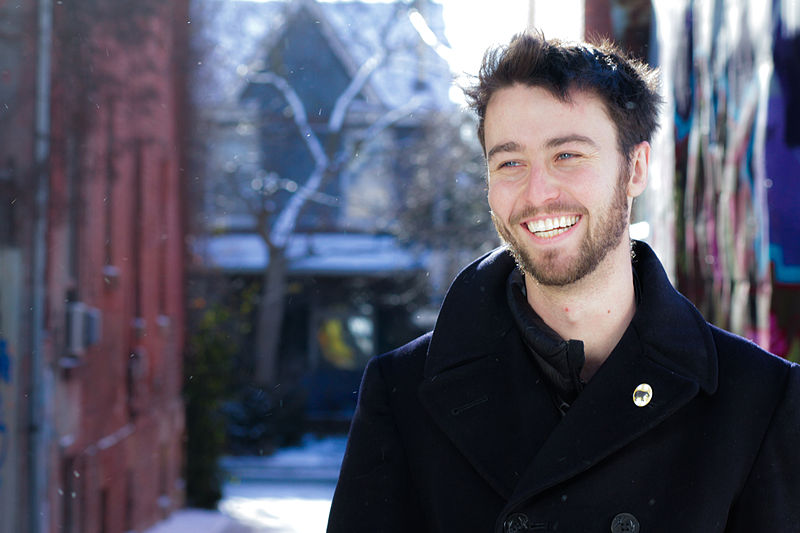

Background information
- Born: 24 July 1985 (age 41); St. John's, Newfoundland and Labrador, Canada
- Origin: Halifax, Nova Scotia, Canada
- Genres: Pop, Acoustic, Rock, Country
- Occupations: Singer-songwriter, composer, producer
- Instruments: Vocals, guitar, keyboards
- Years active: 2003 – present
- Formerly of: Honeydriver
- Website: www.brendancroskerry.com

Brendan Croskerry (born 24 July 1985) is a Canadian singer songwriter and multi-instrumentalist from Halifax, Nova Scotia.

== Career ==
From 2006 to 2011, Brendan lived in and performed across Europe after being spotted by two electronic music producers in Spain while on a university exchange program. He released two full-length albums and was featured on several successful pop compilations. After returning to North America, Brendan returned to his singer-songwriter roots for the release of XK.

=== 2007–2011 ===
Superman is on Holidays, his first commercial pop release, was featured on the international selling compilation albums Disco Estrella in 2007, and Supermodelo 2007. Both compilations reached number 1 in Spain, enduring a total of 8 weeks in the number 1 spot.

In 2008 he released his debut album Goodbye harrier, produced by Paulino Lorenzo, Michel Andrés, and Leroy Quintyn of the independent Spanish label Contactados Factoría Musical. He shared the stage with the Spanish artist Quique Gonzalez at the 2008 Actual Festival in Spain. and performed on the main stage at the 2008 Popkomm Festival, in Germany.

In 2009, Croskerry embarked on a 12-date tour of Germany with Paul Carrack, an English singer more commonly known for being a member of Ace, Squeeze, Mike + The Mechanics, and Roxy Music.

=== Land Rover ===
An instrumental version of "Radio Love Song" from the album Passing Trains (2011) was featured in the Land Rover Freelander 2 television commercial.

=== 2012–2014 ===
In 2012, Croskerry returned to Canada to pursue his music in the country he started in. He joined Toronto-based marketing agency Ossington Creative as head composer and musical consultant for creative-commercial video and radio work. He performed at the 2013 North by North East music festival and was listed one of the "Best of the Fest" by The Huffington Post Canada.

Brendan joined Toronto Mayor Rob Ford's office as a communications special assistant in May 2013. Brendan left city hall to return to music, and recorded a free E.P. titled Live from City Hall with producer David Newfeld (Broken Social Scene, Holy Fuck) inspired by his time in the mayor's office. The promotional video for the EP included a behind the scenes look in the mayor's office moments after being stripped of power on 18 November 2013.

=== 2015 and future projects ===
In 2015, Brendan relocated to Los Angeles, California and began recorded a video series called Sunrise Sessions, which featured original and covered music filmed during LA sunrises. A full-length release titled XK, also co-produced by Newfeld was released 23 June 2015.

== Discography ==
- 2005: Tapas
- 2008: Goodbye Harrier
- 2011: Passing Trains
- 2014: Live from City Hall
- 2015: XK

=== Honeydriver ===
- 2007: Honeydriver

=== Compilations ===
- 2007: Superman Is on Holidays!, on Disco Estrella Vol. 10
- 2007: Superman Is on Holidays!, on Supermodelo 2007
- 2008: Me and Miss Rand, on Mixed Tape Music Magazine Vol. 2
