= Paloma Bloyd =

Spanish and American actress

- Born: March 6, 1988 (age 38); Chicago, Illinois
- Occupation: Actress

Paloma Bloyd Dubra (born March 6, 1988, in Chicago, Illinois) is a Spanish and American actress.

She is best known for playing the lead role in the romantic comedy "Perdona si te llamo Amor" based on the best selling novel written by Federico Moccia. In 2017, Bloyd joined the main cast of Spain's longest running prime time TV show Cuéntame cómo pasó

== Filmography ==
=== Film ===
Year	Title	Character	Director
2018	The Man Who Killed Don Quixote	Melissa	Terry Gilliam
2015	Little Galicia	Silvia	Alber Ponte
2014	Perdona si te llamo amor	Niki	Joaquín Llamas
2012	La fría luz del día	Cristiana	Mabrouk El Mechri
2011	No habrá paz para los malvados	Chica Rubia 2	Enrique Urbizu

=== Television ===
Year	Series	Character	Channel	Episodes
2007	Supermodelo 2007	-	Cuatro	13 episode (contestant)
2009	Cuestión de sexo	-	Cuatro	1 episode
2009 - 2010	Doctor Mateo	Sonia	Antena 3	3 episodes
2010	Inocentes	Sara	Telecinco	2 episodes
2010	La hora de José Mota	Supermodel	La 1	2 episodes
2010	No soy como tú	Violette	Antena 3	2 episodies
2010	El Internado	Sara	Antena 3	3 episodies
2011	Sofía	Tatiana Radziwiłł	Antena 3	2 episodies
2011	Ángel o demonio	Gala	Telecinco	2 episodios
2011 - 2012	El barco	Dulce	Antena 3	4 episodies
2011 - 2013	Águila Roja	Lola	La 1	2 episodie
2013	Borgia	Princess Carlotta d'Aragona	Canal+	5 episodes
2017 - 2023	Cuéntame cómo pasó	Deborah Stern	La 1	27 episodes
2025 - present	Alpha Males	Irene	Netflix	

=== Theater ===
- Adulterios (2008–2010) as Juliet, written by Woody Allen, directed by Verónica Forqué

=== Short films ===
- I Feel Lost (2012), directed by Juan Manuel Aragón.
- La Primera Noche (2012), directed by Eduardo Moyano.
- Atracones (2010), directed by Bernabé Rico
- No existe el adiós (2010), directed by Pablo Bullejos
- Marisa (2009), directed by Nacho Vigalondo
- Mythosis (2009), directed by Álvaro Díaz-Palacios
