= Malena Costa Sjögren =

Spanish advertising model (born 1989)

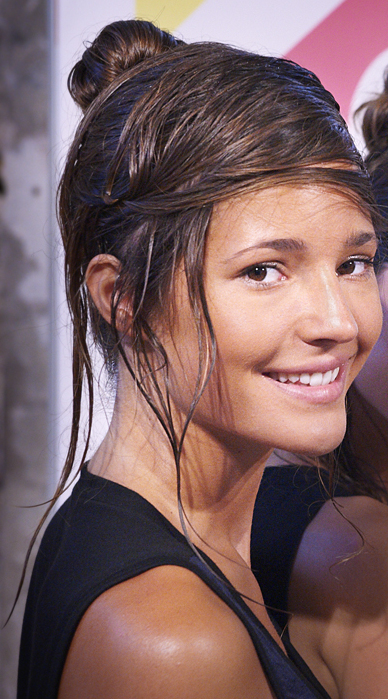
- Born: 31 August 1989 (age 35); Alcúdia, Majorca, Spain
- Occupation: Model

Malena Costa Sjögren (born 31 August 1989, in Alcúdia, Majorca) is a Spanish advertising model.

When she was only 11 years old, she participated in fashion shows. In 2005, she was presented in the Elite Model Look 2005 and became a finalist in sixth place. In 2007 she presented herself at the beauty contest, "Miss Balears". In 2006 she participated in the television programme Super Modelo and began her career as a model for different companies such as Swatch or Don Cotton. She has appeared in all fashion publications, such as Vogue. She signed a contract with the company Model Management.

== Personal life ==
Her father is Spanish (Majorcan) and her mother is Swedish. Her family lives in the Port of Alcudia. Malena is 1.73 m (5 ft 8 in) tall, and is fond of horse riding, painting and spinning.

She had a relationship with the son of the President of travel company Halcón Viajes, Javier Hidalgo. Later she had a relationship with the player of FC Barcelona, Carles Puyol. Since 2012 she has been in a relationship with ACF Fiorentina player, Mario Suárez, with whom she had a daughter on 28 June 2016; Matilda Suárez Costa and July 2017; Mario Suárez Costa.
