= Noelia López =

Spanish model (born 1986)

- Born: Noelia López Vidal; 10 November 1986 (age 39); Lebrija, Sevilla, Spain
- Modeling information
- Height: 1.76 m (5 ft 9 1/2 in)
- Hair color: Black
- Eye color: Brown
- Agency: Elite Model Management - Barcelona (mother agency); Munich Models; Happy Mondays; Angels & Demons Model Management; Topco Models

Noelia López Vidal (born in Lebrija, Sevilla, Spain on November 10, 1986) is a Spanish model known for winning the second season of the Spanish TV contest Supermodelo 2007.

== Biography ==
López won the second season of the Spanish TV contest Supermodelo 2007. After she won the contest she signed a contract with Alain Afflelou in Paris. She also represented Spain in the 2007 Elite Model Look contest. She graduated in Sevilla with a degree in Teaching. Her fashion campaigns include for Speedo, Jorge Blanco Couture, Velmont, BES, Chispazo, Cuetara, El Corte Ingles, Strena. She has also been in Fashion Shows for Sara Coleman, Rappido, Diane Von Furstenberg, Guillermina Baeza, TOM-HOM, Hannibal Laguna Bridal and others. Noelia was the protagonist in David Bustamante's music video "Al filo de la irrealidad". Became the cover page of Spanish magazine DT for the month of November 2010.

She dated with Beşiktaş soccer player José María Gutiérrez, 'Guti' since March 2010.
