= Judit Mascó =

Spanish model

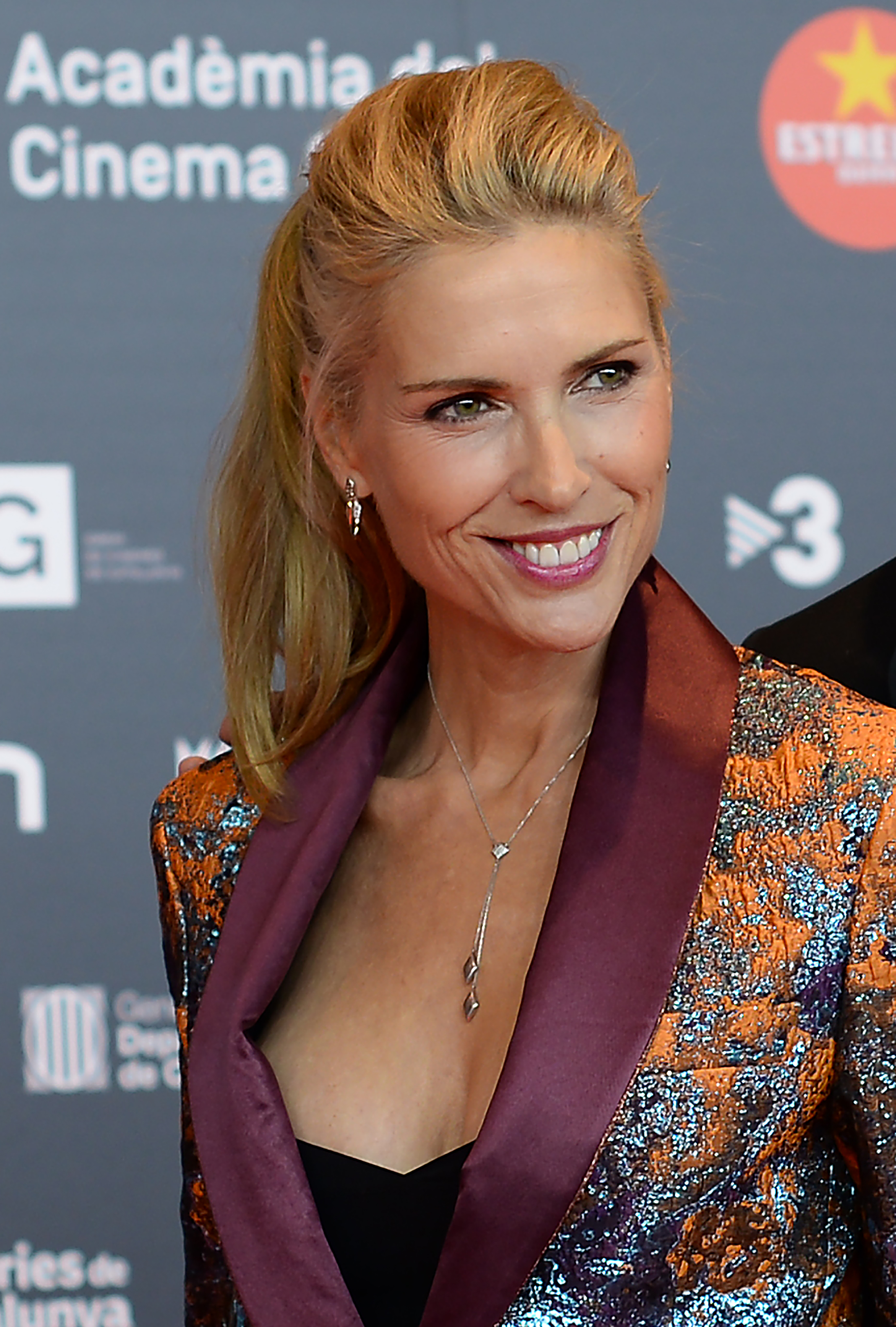
- Judit Mascó, 2020
- Born: Judit Mascó Palau; 12 October 1969 (age 56); Barcelona, Catalonia
- Height: 1.76 m (5 ft 9 1/2 in)
- Spouse: Eduardo Vicente (m. 1993)
- Website: www.juditmasco.es

Judit Mascó i Palau (Catalan pronunciation: [ʒuˈðid məsˈko]; born 12 October 1969) is a Spanish model, television host and writer from Barcelona, Spain.

== Biography ==
=== Modeling ===
==== Early career ====
Mascó grew up in a middle-class family, the daughter of a headmaster. Her debut was at age 13 in a television commercial. She began her studies as a model at the Francina International Modeling Agency's School.

==== International career ====
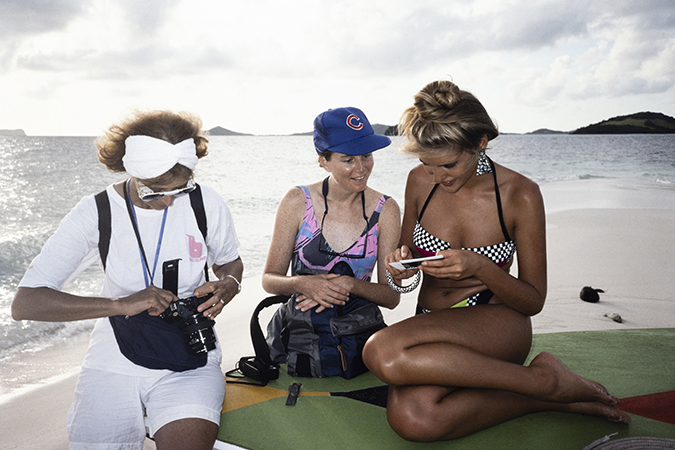
Mascó, right, in 1989 during a Sports Illustrated photoshoot with Jule Campbell (left) and Christine Walker

Mascó appeared in the 1990 Sports Illustrated Swimsuit Issue as the cover model. She also appeared in the 1991, 1992, 1994, and 1995 editions. This cover launched her worldwide and was hired for advertising campaigns, including Max Mara, Laurèl by Escada, Armand Bassi, Betty Barclay, Georges Rech, Mango, Majestic and Palmers Lingerie. She kept been the face of advertising campaigns including Natura Bissé, El Corte Inglés, Clairol, Lancaster, Trident, Fila, Clarins and Timotei. Mascó has been on the cover of US Vogue. She has been in fashion magazines like Elle, Harper's Bazaar, Cleo, Woman, Glamour, Marie Claire, Sposabella, Telva, Ocean Drive, New Woman and Amica.

Mascó has worked with the most well-known photographers in the fashion industry in the 1990s, such as Hans Feurer, Gilles Bensimon, Ellen Von Unwerth, Bruce Weber, Oliviero Toscani, Steven Meisel, Fabrizio Ferri, Albert Watson or Patrick Demarchelier among others. As a catwalk model she appeared in shows for major designers as Armani, Dolce & Gabbana, Valentino, Max Mara, Carolina Herrera, Escada, Sportmax, Byblos, Loewe or Anne Klein.

==== Modeling after 30 ====
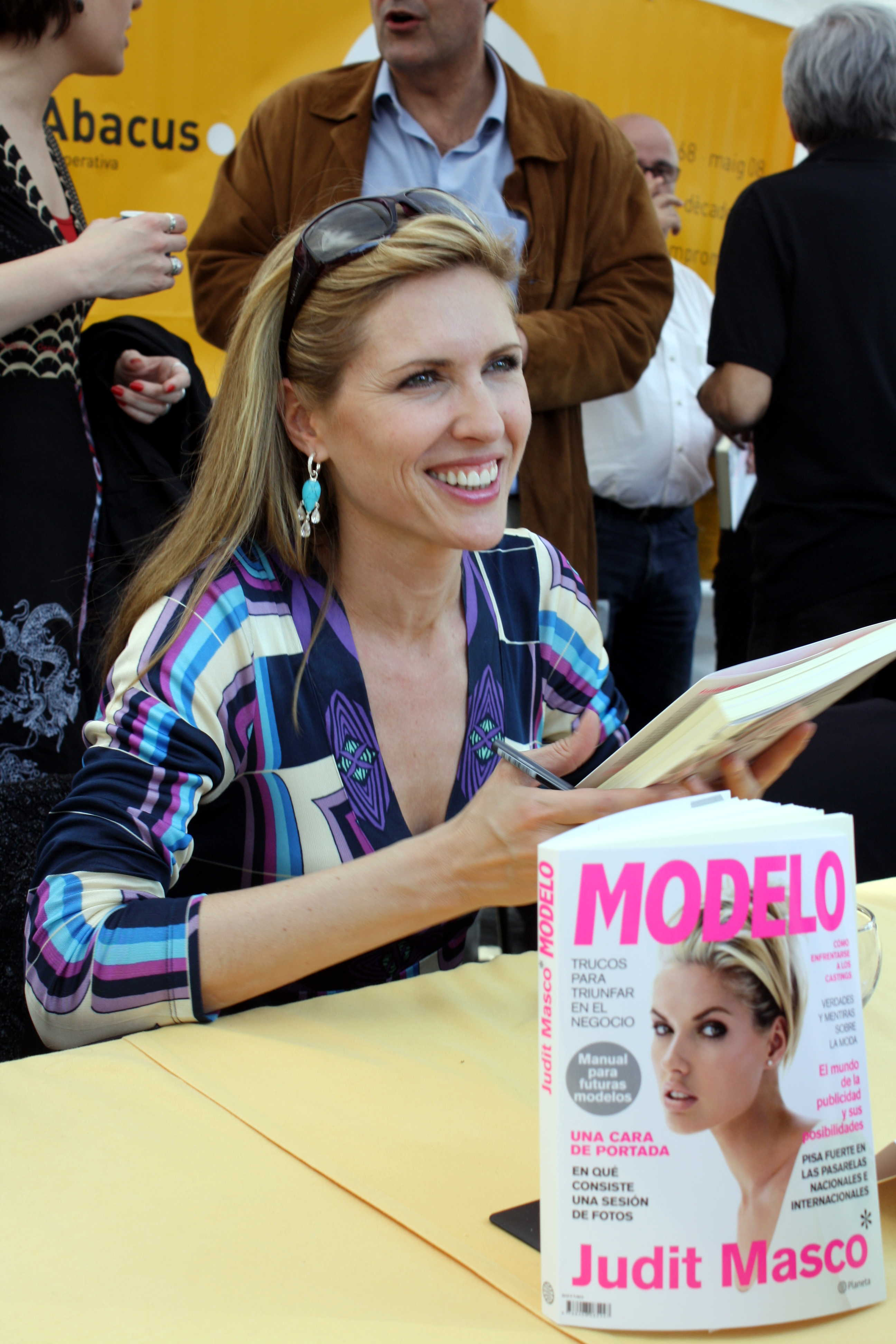
Mascó in 2009 signing her last book's copies

Mascó is regarded as one of the finest Spanish models of the 1990s, and still appears in print occasionally. She was the exclusive spokesmodel for the cosmetics brand Natura Bissé from 2004 until 2008. At the time she also worked for Swarovski, among others. In 2009 she signed with Olay.

=== Acting career ===
She played supporting roles in Después del sueño (After the Dream) and El largo invierno (The Long Winter of '39), two Spanish films from the early 1990s.

=== Television career ===
Mascó's television career began collaborating in the fashion section of TV shows. She made several appearances in Spanish TV series as herself. In 2006 and 2007, she hosted the reality television show Supermodelo in Cuatro TV. She left the show the one season before it was canceled in 2008. That year she hosted the show Els 25 (The 25) on TV3 (Catalonia).

Currently, Masco can be seen on television as the hostess of La 2's TV show Actívate.

=== Awards ===
Mascó received the prestigious Elle Woman of the Year Award in 2003 and the Protagonistas Award in 2009 for her activism.

=== Activism ===
Outside of TV, modeling, and writing, Mascó is involved in social change efforts. She is a board member of several international nongovernmental organizations such as the Vicente Ferrer Foundation, the Asociación de Donantes de Riñón Españoles (Association of Spanish Kidney Donors), Amics de la Gent Gran(Friends of the Elderly) and the Caravana Solidaria al África Occidental (West Africa Solidarity Caravan). In addition she is the president of the Festival of Childhood and Youth, held in Barcelona and advisory board member of Oxfam Spain.

In 2000 she traveled to Florida to meet with Spanish citizen Joaquin José Martínez, at the time imprisoned in the death row, to draw attention in the media to his death sentence for two murders he did not commit. In 2001 the Florida Supreme Court acquitted him of all charges.

=== Writing ===
Mascó has written two books. In 2004, her memoir, El Libro de Judit Mascó (Judit Mascó's book), was published. In 2009, she released her second book, Modelo (Model).

=== Personal life ===
She is married to lawyer Eduardo Vicente, who was a high school classmate of her brother. They have four daughters.
