= Top Model po-ukrainsky season 7 =

Top Model po-ukrainsky
- Season 7
- No. of episodes: 10

Release
- Original network: Novyi Kanal
- Original release: October 16 – December 21, 2020

Season chronology
- ← Previous; Cycle 6

Supermodel po-ukrainsky, cycle 7 (subtitled as Super Top Model po-ukrainsky) is the seventh season of Top Model po-ukrainsky. Twenty girls from previous cycles of "Supermodel po-ukrainsky" and "Top Model po-ukrainsky" competed for the title.

Prizes included: a cash prize of 300,000₴, a cover of Marie Claire in Ukraine, and a campaign for Make Up UA.

== Contestants ==
Contestant	Age	Height	Hometown	Original cycle	Original placement	Outcome	Place
Ekaterina 'Katya' Svinarchuk	22	167 cm (5 ft 5 1/2 in)	Chernivtsi	Cycle 3	4	Episode 1	20-15
Yelizaveta 'Liza' Doronko	22	180 cm (5 ft 11 in)	Kharkiv	Cycle 4	14	Episode 1	20-15
Karina Minayeva	30	175 cm (5 ft 9 in)	Yevpatoria	Cycle 1	11	Episode 1	20-15
Karina Danilova	27	176 cm (5 ft 9 1/2 in)	Kryvyi Rih	Cycle 1	4	Episode 1	20-15
Hanna 'Anya' Sulima	22	170 cm (5 ft 7 in)	Kryvyi Rih	Cycle 2	5	Episode 1	20-15
Anna-Kristina Prihodko	25	175 cm (5 ft 9 in)	Lviv	Cycle 1	5	Episode 1	20-15
Katerina 'Katya' Chechelenko	18	172 cm (5 ft 7 1/2 in)	Kyiv	Cycle 6	4	Episode 2	14 (DQ)
Anastasiya 'Nastya' Leuhina	21	173 cm (5 ft 8 in)	Kharkiv	Cycle 6	12	Episode 2	13 (quit)
Anastasiya 'Nastya' Panova	25	175 cm (5 ft 9 in)	Kryvyi Rih	Cycle 4	15	Episode 3	12
Irina 'Ira' Rotar	22	177 cm (5 ft 9 1/2 in)	Kryvyi Rih	Cycle 3	8	Episode 5	11
Sofi Beridze	22	175 cm (5 ft 9 in)	Batumi, Georgia	Cycle 5	11	Episode 6	10-8
Viktoria 'Vika' Rogalchuk	25	169 cm (5 ft 6 1/2 in)	Kyiv	Cycle 4	2	Episode 6	10-8
Amina Dosimbaeva	23	179 cm (5 ft 10 1/2 in)	Almaty, Kazakhstan	Cycle 6	8	Episode 6	10-8
Oleksandra 'Sasha' Kugat	24	176 cm (5 ft 9 1/2 in)	Odesa	Cycle 3	6	Episode 7	7 (quit)
Margarita 'Margo' Verhovtseva	20	176 cm (5 ft 9 1/2 in)	Kherson	Cycle 6	10	Episode 7	6
Arina Lyubityelyeva	22	180 cm (5 ft 11 in)	Kryvyi Rih	Cycle 2	3	Episode 9	5
Irina 'Ira' Moysak	23	177 cm (5 ft 9 1/2 in)	Stryi	Cycle 4	12	Episode 9	4
Oleksandra 'Sasha' Litvin	21	173 cm (5 ft 8 in)	Kyiv	Cycle 3	5	Episode 10	3-2
Darya 'Dasha' Maystrenko	21	178 cm (5 ft 10 in)	Kaniv	Cycle 3	2	Episode 10	3-2
Tetyana 'Tanya' Brik	22	178 cm (5 ft 10 in)	Kryvyi Rih	Cycle 1	3	Episode 10	1

== Episodes ==
=== Episode 1 ===
Original airdate: October 16, 2020

- Immune: Amina Dosimbaeva, Dasha Maystrenko, Katya Chechelenko, Margo Verhovtseva, Tanya Brik & Sofi Beridze
- Best photo: Sasha Kugat
- First Eliminated: Anya Sulima, Anna-Kristina Prihodko, Karina Minayeva, Karina Danilova, Katya Svinarchuk & Liza Doronko
- Bottom two: Nastya Leuhina & Arina Lyubityelyeva
- Second Eliminated: None

=== Episode 2 ===
Original airdate: October 23, 2020

- Disqualified: Katya Chechelenko
- Quit: Nastya Leuhina
- Best photo: Margo Verhovtseva
- Bottom two: Ira Rotar & Sofi Beridze
- Second Eliminated: None

=== Episode 3 ===
Original airdate: October 30, 2020

- Best photo: Vika Rogalchuk
- Bottom two: Nastya Panova & Ira Rotar
- Eliminated: Nastya Panova

=== Episode 4 ===
Original airdate: November 9, 2020

- Best photo: Tanya Bryk
- Bottom two: Dasha Maystrenko & Margo Verhovtseva
- Eliminated: Dasha Maystrenko

=== Episode 5 ===
Original airdate: November 16, 2020

- Best photo: Arina Lyubityelyeva
- Bottom two: Amina Dosimbaeva & Ira Rotar
- Eliminated: Ira Rotar

=== Episode 6 ===
Original airdate: November 23, 2020

- Best photo: Ira Moysak
- First Eliminated: Sofi Beridze
- Second Eliminated: Vika Rogalchuk
- Bottom two: Amina Dosimbaeva & Margo Verhovtseva
- Second Eliminated: Amina Dosimbaeva

=== Episode 7 ===
Original airdate: November 30, 2020

- Returned: Dasha Maystrenko
- Quit: Sasha Kugat
- Best photo: Tanya Bryk
- Bottom two: Ira Moysak & Margo Verhovtseva
- Eliminated: Margo Verhovtseva

=== Episode 8 ===
Original airdate: December 7, 2020

- Best photo: Dasha Maystrenko
- Bottom two: Arina Lyubityelyeva & Ira Moysak
- Eliminated: None

=== Episode 9 ===
Original airdate: December 14, 2020

- Shoot out: Arina Lyubityelyeva & Ira Moysak
- First eliminated outside of panel: Arina Lyubityelyeva
- Second eliminated outside of panel: Ira Moysak

=== Episode 10 ===
Original airdate: December 21, 2020

- Final three: Dasha Maystrenko, Sasha Litvin & Tanya Bryk
- Ukraine's Next Top Model: Tanya Bryk

== Summaries ==
=== Results ===
Order	Episodes									
Order	1 (Note: In Episode 1, Sofi, Tanya, Amina, Margo and Dasha were immune from elimination and did not have to participate in the photoshoot, due to receiving the most votes online. Katya C. was called separate to the already immune girls and was granted immunity from the guest judge. Nastya L. and Arina landed in the bottom two. None were eliminated.)	2 (Note: In Episodes 2, Nastya L. quit the competition for mental health reasons. During judging, Katya C. was disqualified from the competition due to unprofessional behaviour at the photoshoot)	3	4 (Note: In Episode 4, Sasha L. was called first so she could go to the hospital for medical reasons.)	5	6	7 (Note: In Episode 7, Dasha returned to the competition. Sasha K. quit the competition before the photoshoot.)	8 (Note: Episode 8 was a non-elimination)	9 (Note: In Episode 9, Arina was eliminated outside of panel at the first challenge. Ira M. was eliminated outside of panel at the second challenge.)	10
1	Sofi	Margo	Vika	Sasha L.	Arina	Sasha L. Sasha K.	Tanya	Dasha	Tanya; Dasha; Sasha L.	Tanya
2	Tanya	Tanya	Arina	Tanya	Tanya	Sasha L. Sasha K.	Dasha	Tanya	Tanya; Dasha; Sasha L.	Dasha; Sasha L.
3	Amina	Sasha K.	Margo	Arina	Sasha L.	Sofi	Arina	Sasha L.	Tanya; Dasha; Sasha L.	Dasha; Sasha L.
4	Margo	Vika	Ira M.	Ira R.	Vika	Ira M.	Sasha L.	Arina; Ira M.	Ira M.	
5	Dasha	Ira M.	Sasha K.	Sasha K.	Margo	Arina; Tanya	Ira M.	Arina; Ira M.	Arina	
6	Vika	Sasha L.	Sofi	Sofi	Sofi	Arina; Tanya	Margo			
7	Katya S.	Arina	Dasha	Amina	Sasha K.	Vika	Sasha K.			
8	Ira M.	Dasha	Amina	Ira M.	Ira M.	Margo				
9	Sasha K.	Amina	Tanya	Vika	Amina	Amina				
10	Liza	Nastya P.	Sasha L.	Margo	Ira R.					
11	Sasha L.	Ira R. Sofi	Ira R.	Dasha						
12	Nastya P.	Ira R. Sofi	Nastya P.							
13	Katya C.	Nastya L.								
14	Karina M.	Katya C.								
15	Karina D.									
16	Anna									
17	Ira R.									
18	Anna-Kristina									
19	Nastya L. Arina									
20	Nastya L. Arina									

The contestant was eliminated
The contestant was in danger of elimination
The contestant was disqualified
The contestant was originally eliminated, but was saved.
The contestant quit the competition
The contestant was immune from elimination
The contestant won best photo
The contestant won the competition

=== Photo shoot guide ===
- Episode 1 photo shoot: Hanging on giant clock
- Episode 2 photo shoot: Re-work on previous photoshoots, dance in the garden
- Episode 3 photo shoot: Hanging on fabric
- Episode 4 photo shoot: Luxury Party
- Episode 5 photo shoot: Women professions
- Episode 6 photo shoot: Perfectil advertisement, hanging on Eiffel tower
- Episode 7 photo shoot: Animals from red book
- Episode 8 photo shoot: Sckifs
- Episode 9 life-photo shoot: Against domestic violence
- Episode 10 photo shoot: Hanging on lustre
