= Top Model po-ukrainsky season 6 =

Top Model po-ukrainsky
- Season 6
- No. of episodes: 18

Release
- Original network: Novyi Kanal
- Original release: August 30 – December 27, 2019

Season chronology
- ← Previous; Cycle 5 Next → Cycle 7

Top Model po-ukrainsky, cycle 6 is the sixth season of Top Model po-ukrainsky. The show returned to an all-female format.

Among with the prizes was: a cash prize of 100,000₴, a cover of Pink Magazine in Ukraine, and modelling contract with K Models.

The winner of the competition was 25-year-old Malvina Chuklya.

Amina Dosimbaeva, Anastasiya Leuhina, Katya Chechelenko and Margarita Verhovtseva would later return to compete for the tile in Top Model po-ukrainsky, cycle 7. Anastasiya Leuhina quit the competition in Episode 2 and Katya Chechelenko was disqualified (due to inappropriate behaviour on photoshoot) in the same episode. Amina Dosimbaeva was eliminated in Episode 6. Margo was eliminated in Episode 7.

== Contestants ==
(ages stated are at start of contest)

Contestant	Age	Height	Hometown	Outcome	Place
Karina Dyachuk	17	175 cm (5 ft 9 in)	Odesa	Episode 3	17
Darina Didovich	24	178 cm (5 ft 10 in)	Kharkiv	Episode 4	16 (quit)
Anastasiya 'Nastya' Lazaryeva	23	174 cm (5 ft 8 1/2 in)	Mariupol	Episode 4	15
Nataliya Savchenko	22	181 cm (5 ft 11 1/2 in)	Izmail	Episode 5	14
Mariya 'Masha' Mihyeyeva	24	171 cm (5 ft 7 1/2 in)	Kharkiv	Episode 6	13
Anastasiya 'Nastya' Leuhina	19	173 cm (5 ft 8 in)	Kharkiv	Episode 7	12
Yarina Samarik	16	182 cm (5 ft 11 1/2 in)	Lviv	Episode 8	11
Margarita 'Margo' Verhovtseva	18	176 cm (5 ft 9 1/2 in)	Kherson	Episode 9	10
Yelizaveta 'Liza' Bezkrovna	16	180 cm (5 ft 11 in)	Poltava	Episode 10	9
Amina Dosimbaeva	22	179 cm (5 ft 10 1/2 in)	Almaty, Kazakhstan	Episode 12	8
Yuliya Binkovska	25	181 cm (5 ft 11 1/2 in)	Lutsk	Episode 13	7
Anastasiya 'Nastya' Ruda	23	174 cm (5 ft 8 1/2 in)	Odesa	Episode 14	6
Darina Gerasimchuk	16	184 cm (6 ft 1/2 in)	Polonne	Episode 15	5
Katerina 'Katya' Chechelenko	16	172 cm (5 ft 7 1/2 in)	Kyiv	Episode 16	4
Katerina 'Katya' Kulichenko	25	178 cm (5 ft 10 in)	Zaporizhia	Episode 18	3
Natasha Maslovska	17	172 cm (5 ft 7 1/2 in)	Kharkiv	Episode 18	2
Malvina Chuklya	25	178 cm (5 ft 10 in)	Chernivtsi	Episode 18	1

== Episodes ==
=== Episode 1 ===
Original airdate: August 30, 2019

This was the first casting episode.

=== Episode 2 ===
Original airdate: September 6, 2019

This was the second casting episode.

=== Episode 3 ===
Original airdate: September 13, 2019

- Immune: Malvina Chuklya
- Bottom two: Darina Didovich & Karina Dyachuk
- Eliminated: Karina Dyachuk

=== Episode 4 ===
Original airdate: September 20, 2019

- Quit: Darina Didovich
- Bottom four Nastya Lazaryeva, Katya Chechelenko, Margo Verhovtseva & Yuliya Binkovska
- Quit: Malvina Chuklya
- Eliminated: Nastya Lazaryeva

=== Episode 5 ===
Original airdate: September 27, 2019

- Bottom two: Liza Bezkrovna & Nataliya Savchenko
- Eliminated: Nataliya Savchenko

=== Episode 6 ===
Original airdate: October 4, 2019

- Immune: Amina Dosimbaeva & Katya Kulichenko
- Bottom two: Yuliya Binkovska & Masha Mihyeyeva
- Eliminated: Masha Mihyeyeva

=== Episode 7 ===
Original airdate: October 11, 2019

- Returned: Malvina Chuklya
- Best photo: Darina Gerasimchuk
- Bottom two: Katya Kulichenko & Nastya Leuhina
- Eliminated: Nastya Leuhina

=== Episode 8 ===
Original airdate: October 18, 2019

- Immune 1: Natasha Masklovska
- Immune 2: Katya Chechelenko
- Immune 3: Yuliya Binkovska
- Best photo: Nastya Ruda
- Bottom two: Yarina Samarik & Liza Bezkrovna
- Eliminated: Yarina Samarik

=== Episode 9 ===
Original airdate: October 25, 2019

- Best photo: Natasha Maslovska
- Bottom two: Amina Dosimbaeva & Margo Verhovtseva
- Eliminated: Margo Verhovtseva

=== Episode 10 ===
Original airdate: November 1, 2019

- Best photo: Malvina Chuklya
- Bottom two: Katya Chechelenko & Liza Bezkrovna
- Eliminated: Liza Bezkrovna

=== Episode 11 ===
Original airdate: November 8, 2019

- Best photo: Malvina Chuklya
- Bottom two: Katya Kulichenko & Natasha Maslovska
- Originally eliminated but saved: Natasha Maslovska

=== Episode 12 ===
Original airdate: November 15, 2019

- Best photo: Katya Chechelenko
- Bottom two: Amina Dosimbaeva & Nastya Ruda
- Eliminated: Amina Dosimbaeva

=== Episode 13 ===
Original airdate: November 22, 2019

- Best photo: Katya Kulichenko
- Eliminated: Yuliya Binkovska

=== Episode 14 ===
Original airdate: November 29, 2019

- Immune: Darina Gerasimchuk
- Best photo: Natasha Maslovska
- Bottom two: Nastya Ruda & Malvina Chuklya
- Eliminated: Nastya Ruda

=== Episode 15 ===
Original airdate: December 6, 2019

- Best photo: Katya Kulichenko
- Bottom two: Darina Gerasimchuk & Katya Chechelenko
- Eliminated: Darina Gerasimchuk

=== Episode 16 ===
Original airdate: December 13, 2019

- Best photo: Malvina Chuklya
- Bottom two: Katya Chechelenko & Natasha Maslovska
- Eliminated: Katya Chechelenko

=== Episode 17 ===
Original airdate: December 20, 2019

- Best photo: Katya Kulichenko
- Originally eliminated but saved: Natasha Maslovska

=== Episode 18 ===
Original airdate: December 27, 2019

- Bottom two: Malvina Chuklya & Katya Kulichenko
- Eliminated: Katya Kulichenko
- Final two: Malvina Chuklya & Natasha Maslovska
- Ukraine's Next Top Model: Malvina Chuklya

== Summaries ==
=== Results ===
Place	Model	Episodes																
Place	Model	3 (Note: In episode 3, Malvina was immune from elimination for winning the challenge.)	4 (Note: In episode 4, Malvina decided to quit after being told her father had passed away, she was allowed to return when she was ready. Darina D. quit the competition after refusing her makeover.)	5	6 (Note: In episode 6, Amina and Katerina K. were immune from elimination.)	7 (Note: In episode 7, Malvina returned to the competition.)	8	9	10	11	12	13	14	15	16	17	18	
1	Malvina	IMM	QUIT			SAFE	SAFE	SAFE	WIN	WIN	SAFE	SAFE	LOW	SAFE	WIN	SAFE	LOW	WINNER
2	Natasha	SAFE	SAFE	SAFE	SAFE	SAFE	IMM	WIN	SAFE	OUT	SAFE	SAFE	WIN	SAFE	LOW	OUT	SAFE	OUT
3	Katya K.	SAFE	SAFE	SAFE	IMM	LOW	SAFE	SAFE	SAFE	LOW	SAFE	WIN	SAFE	WIN	SAFE	WIN	OUT	
4	Katya C.	SAFE	LOW	SAFE	SAFE	SAFE	IMM	SAFE	LOW	SAFE	WIN	SAFE	SAFE	LOW	OUT			
5	Darina G.	SAFE	SAFE	SAFE	SAFE	WIN	SAFE	SAFE	SAFE	SAFE	SAFE	SAFE	IMM	OUT				
6	Nastya R.	SAFE	SAFE	SAFE	SAFE	SAFE	WIN	SAFE	SAFE	SAFE	LOW	SAFE	OUT					
7	Yuliya	SAFE	LOW	SAFE	LOW	SAFE	IMM	SAFE	SAFE	SAFE	SAFE	OUT						
8	Amina	SAFE	SAFE	SAFE	IMM	SAFE	SAFE	LOW	SAFE	SAFE	OUT							
9	Liza	SAFE	SAFE	LOW	SAFE	SAFE	LOW	SAFE	OUT									
10	Margo	SAFE	LOW	SAFE	SAFE	SAFE	SAFE	OUT										
11	Yarina	SAFE	SAFE	SAFE	SAFE	SAFE	OUT											
12	Nastya Le.	SAFE	SAFE	SAFE	SAFE	OUT												
13	Masha	SAFE	SAFE	SAFE	OUT													
14	Nataliya	SAFE	SAFE	OUT														
15	Nastya La.	SAFE	OUT															
16	Darina D.	LOW	QUIT															
17	Karina	OUT																

The contestant was in danger of elimination
The contestant was eliminated
The contestant was originally eliminated, but was saved.
The contestant quit the competition
The contestant was immune from elimination
The contestant won best photo
The contestant won the competition

=== Photo shoot guide ===
- Episode 3 photo shoot: Self styled promo shoot
- Episode 4 photo shoot: Cheerleaders
- Episode 5 photo shoots: Strange poses; Diva on a disco ball
- Episode 6 photo shoot: Road to Graduation
- Episode 7 photo shoots: Bubbles; Cat calendar
- Episode 8 photo shoots: Aliens in the bubble; Black and white ballerina in pairs
- Episode 9 photo shoot: Slumber Party in pairs
- Episode 10 photo shoots: Forest witches; Mermaids with previous male contestant
- Episode 11 photo shoot: Caged Animals
- Episode 12 photo shoots: Princess on the carriage; Swapping Responsibilities
- Episode 13 photo shoot: Anti-stress
- Episode 14 photo shoots: Stage of romance with Irakli Makatsaria; Anime style on stilts
- Episode 15 photo shoot: Hanging on a rope ladder from a hot air balloon
- Episode 16 photo shoot: Turkish Brides
- Episode 17 photo shoot: Powdered Spices
- Episode 18 video shoot: Satno Muerto
