= Top Model po-ukrainsky season 5 =

Top Model po-ukrainsky
- Season 5
- No. of episodes: 18

Release
- Original network: Novyi Kanal
- Original release: August 31 – December 28, 2018

Season chronology
- ← Previous; Cycle 4 Next → Cycle 6

Top Model po-ukrainsky, cycle 5 is the fifth season of Top Model po-ukrainsky. Like previous season, the show introduced a division of also male models have a chance of winning the competition.

Among with the prizes was: a cash prize of 100,000₴, a cover of Pink Magazine in Ukraine, a trip to New York City sponsored by Maybelline, a modelling contract with K Models, and a Maybelline hampers.

The winner of the competition was 19-year-old Yana Kutishevska.

Sofi Beridze, returned for season 7. Sofi Beridze was eliminated in Episode 6.

== Contestants ==
(ages stated are at start of contest)

Contestant	Age	Height	Hometown	Outcome	Place
Ezedzhi Dzhonson Nnamdi	19	1.85 m (6 ft 1 in)	Kharkiv	Episode 3	15
Ivan Kiyanitsa	21	1.85 m (6 ft 1 in)	Kyiv	Episode 4	14
Alisa Golovnyova	19	1.75 m (5 ft 9 in)	Luhansk	Episode 5	13
Sergey Gerdov	26	1.88 m (6 ft 2 in)	Tokmak	Episode 7	12
Sofi Beridze	19	1.75 m (5 ft 9 in)	Batumi, Georgia	Episode 8	11
Anna Troyan	21	1.78 m (5 ft 10 in)	Kharkiv	Episode 9	10
Denys Kovalyov	18	1.82 m (5 ft 11 1/2 in)	Kharkiv	Episode 11	9 (quit)
Yaroslava 'Yasya' Krutova	25	1.68 m (5 ft 6 in)	Kharkiv	Episode 11	8
Dmytro 'Dima' Toporynskiy	28	1.86 m (6 ft 1 in)	Vasylkiv	Episode 12	7 (quit)
Maksym 'Maks' Osadchuk	22	1.86 m (6 ft 1 in)	Lviv	Episode 13	6
Yehor Stepanenko	23	1.86 m (6 ft 1 in)	Shakhtarsk	Episode 14	5
Yuliya Dyhan	22	1.73 m (5 ft 8 in)	Odesa	Episode 16	4
Dmytro 'Dima' Sukach	22	1.92 m (6 ft 3 1/2 in)	Saky	Episode 17	3
Katerina 'Katya' Polchenko	19	1.73 m (5 ft 8 in)	Kharkiv	Episode 18	2
Yana Kutishevskaya	19	1.76 m (5 ft 9 1/2 in)	Podilsk	Episode 18	1

== Episodes ==
=== Episode 1 ===
Original airdate: August 31, 2018

This was the first casting episode. Out of a large group of model hopefuls only 30 would advance to the next round.

=== Episode 2 ===
Original airdate: September 7, 2018

This was the second casting episode. The remaining 30 semi-finalists were narrowed down to the top 15.

=== Episode 3 ===
Original airdate: September 14, 2018

- Bottom two: Alisa Golovniova & Ezedzhi Dzhonson Nnamdi
- Eliminated: Ezedzhi Dzhonson Nnamdi

=== Episode 4 ===
Original airdate: September 21, 2018

- Immune: Anna Troyan
- Best photo: Denys Kovalyov
- Bottom two: Ivan Kianyanitsa & Yasya Krutova
- Eliminated: Ivan Kianyanitsa

=== Episode 5 ===
Original airdate: September 28, 2018

- Best photo: Katya Polchenko
- Bottom two: Alisa Golovniova & Dima Sukach
- Eliminated: Alisa Golovniova

=== Episode 6 ===
Original airdate: October 5, 2018

- Best photo: Yasya Krutova
- Immune: Anna Troyan, Katya Polchenko, Sofi Beridze, Yana Kutishevska & Yuliya Dihan
- Bottom two: Denys Kovalyov & Yehor Stepanenko
- Eliminated: Denys Kovalyov

=== Episode 7 ===
Original airdate: October 12, 2018

- Bottom two: Serhiy Herdov & Yuliya Dihan
- Eliminated: Serhiy Herdov

=== Episode 8 ===
Original airdate: October 19, 2018

- Best photo: Dima Toporynskiy
- Bottom two: Maks Osadchuk & Sofi Beridze
- Eliminated: Sofi Beridze

=== Episode 9 ===
Original airdate: October 26, 2018

- Best photo: Dima Sukach
- Bottom two: Anna Troyan & Maks Osadchuk
- Eliminated: Anna Troyan

=== Episode 10 ===
Original airdate: November 2, 2018

- Best photo: Yuliya Dihan
- Bottom two: Dima Sukach & Katya Polchenko
- Eliminated: Dima Sukach

=== Episode 11 ===
Original airdate: November 9, 2018

- Returned: Denys Kovalyov & Dima Sukach
- Quit: Denys Kovalyov
- Immune: Maks Osadchuk
- Best photo: Yuliya Dihan
- Bottom two: Yasya Krutova & Yehor Stepanenko
- Eliminated: Yasya Krutova

=== Episode 12 ===
Original airdate: November 16, 2018

- Best photo: Yehor Stepanenko
- Quit: Dima Toporinskiy
- Bottom two: Katya Polchenko & Maks Osadchuk
- Eliminated: None

=== Episode 13 ===
Original airdate: November 23, 2018

- Best photo: Katya Polchenko
- Bottom two: Yuliya Dihan & Maks Osadchuk
- Eliminated: Maks Osadchuk

=== Episode 14 ===
Original airdate: November 30, 2018

- Best photo: Katya Polchenko
- Bottom two: Yana Kutishevska & Yehor Stepanenko
- Eliminated: Yehor Stepanenko

=== Episode 15 ===
Original airdate: December 7, 2018

- Best photo: Yana Kutishevska
- Bottom two: Yuliya Dihan & Katya Polchenko
- Eliminated: None

=== Episode 16 ===
Original airdate: December 14, 2018

- Best photo: Yana Kutishevska
- Bottom two: Yuliya Dykhan & Katya Polchenko
- Eliminated: Yuliya Dykhan

=== Episode 17 ===
Original airdate: December 21, 2018

- Eliminated: Dima Sukach

=== Episode 18 ===
Original airdate: December 28, 2018

The final 2 start their final challenges: At the sunflower field, where they shoot a motion editorial from a normal girl to a model; A final photoshoot as they show their personality along with all 13 eliminated contestant of this season, and they have a final runway show for Marina Ribalko. At the end, Yana became the winner of this season.

- Final two: Katya Polchenko & Yana Kutishevska
- Ukraine's Next Top Model: Yana Kutishevska

== Summaries ==
=== Results ===
Place	Model	Episodes															
Place	Model	3	4 (Note: In episode 4, Anna was immune from elimination for winning the challenge.)	5	6 (Note: In episode 6, all girls were immune from elimination for winning a group challenge.)	7	8	9	10	11 (Note: In episode 11, Denys & Dima S. returned into the competition. Denys decided to quit after severe bullying in the same episode.)	12	13	14	15 (Note: In episode 15, nobody was eliminated.)	16	17	18
1	Yana	SAFE	SAFE	SAFE	IMM	SAFE	SAFE	SAFE	SAFE	SAFE	SAFE	SAFE	LOW	WIN	WIN	WIN	WINNER
2	Katya	SAFE	SAFE	WIN	IMM	SAFE	SAFE	SAFE	LOW	SAFE	LOW	WIN	WIN	LOW	LOW	LOW	OUT
3	Dima S.	SAFE	SAFE	LOW	SAFE	SAFE	SAFE	WIN	OUT	SAFE	SAFE	SAFE	SAFE	SAFE	SAFE	OUT	
4	Yuliya	SAFE	SAFE	SAFE	IMM	LOW	SAFE	SAFE	WIN	WIN	SAFE	LOW	SAFE	OUT	OUT		
5	Yehor	SAFE	SAFE	SAFE	LOW	SAFE	SAFE	SAFE	SAFE	LOW	WIN	SAFE	OUT				
6	Maks	SAFE	SAFE	SAFE	SAFE	SAFE	LOW	LOW	SAFE	IMM	LOW	OUT					
7	Dima T.	SAFE	SAFE	SAFE	SAFE	SAFE	WIN	SAFE	SAFE	SAFE	QUIT						
8	Yasya	SAFE	LOW	SAFE	WIN	SAFE	SAFE	SAFE	SAFE	OUT							
9	Denys	SAFE	WIN	SAFE	OUT					QUIT							
10	Anna	SAFE	IMM	SAFE	IMM	SAFE	SAFE	OUT									
11	Sofi	SAFE	SAFE	SAFE	IMM	SAFE	OUT										
12	Sergey	SAFE	SAFE	SAFE	SAFE	OUT											
13	Alisa	LOW	SAFE	OUT													
14	Ivan	SAFE	OUT														
15	Ezedzhi	OUT															

The contestant was in the bottom two
The contestant was eliminated
The contestant was originally eliminated, but was saved.
The contestant quit the competition
The contestant was immune from elimination
The contestant won best photo
The contestant won the competition

=== Photo shoot guide ===
- Episode 2 photo shoots: Burlesque; show your personality
- Episode 3 photo shoot: Cycling in groups
- Episode 4 photo shoots: Compcard; Posing topless
- Episode 5 photo shoot: Mock covers
- Episode 6 photo shoots: Dancing in pairs; Portraying warriors in a battle
- Episode 7 photo shoot: Posing with elders
- Episode 8 photo shoots: Ice age love story; Wrestlers
- Episode 9 photo shoots: Drowned; Anti-Christ inspired
- Episode 10 photo shoot: Burden
- Episode 11 photo shoots: Hangover; Embracing natural hair
- Episode 12 photo shoots: David LaChapelle inspired; Glamping; Rococo
- Episode 13 photo shoot: Red carpet
- Episode 14 photo shoot: Shape of Water inspired
- Episode 15 photo shoots: Vegas Showgirls and Showman; Ritual Shaman
- Episode 16 photo shoots: Messy Greek Mythology; Underwater
- Episode 17 photo shoot: Football
- Episode 18 photo shoot: Personality along with previous eliminated contestant
