= Supermodel po-ukrainsky season 3 =

Supermodel po-ukrainsky
- Season 3
- No. of episodes: 15

Release
- Original network: Novyi Kanal
- Original release: August 26 – December 2, 2016

Season chronology
- ← Previous; Cycle 2 Next → Cycle 4

Supermodel po-ukrainsky, cycle 3 was the third season of Supermodel po-ukrainsky. The season premiered on August 26, 2016. All former judges returned for this season. In contrast to the previous two seasons, the show introduced a division of contestants by teams, as well as 'elimination battles' for contestants in the bottom two to help determine who would get eliminated.

The winner of the competition was 18-year-old Maria Grebenyuk. As part of her prizes, she received the opportunity to star on the cover of Pink Magazine in Ukraine, as well as become the face of Fresh Fashion Day of Ukrainian Fashion Week 2017, a contracts with K Models and a trip to New York City.

Darya Maystrenko, Irina Rotar, Katya Svinarchuk, Oleksandra Litvin and Sasha Kugat would later return to compete for the tile in Top Model po-ukrainsky, cycle 7. Katya Svinarchuk was eliminated in Episode 1. Darya Maystrenko was eliminated in Episode 4 and was brought back in Episode 7. Irina Rotar was eliminated in Episode 5. Sasha Kugat quit the competition in Episode 7. Darya Maystrenko and Sasha Litvin finished as runner-ups.

== Series summary ==
=== Casting ===
From 16000 girls audition for this season, the selected applicants will get to meet the judges and in this season, each judges will choose 10 girls who they want to be on their team, narrowed down to 30 semi-finalists who received a callback. In contrast to the previous season, online submissions were allowed and the 3 girls with the most vote will automatically entered the top 30 and get to pick the team to entered. Of these 30, 15 were selected to be a part of the final cast.

=== Destinations ===
The destination for the season was in Kharkiv and Odesa in Ukraine. The semi-final for the show took place in international destination of Munich.

== Contestants ==
(ages stated are at start of contest)

Contestant	Age	Height	Team	HomeTown	Finish	Place
Yuliya 'Yulya' Shchedrina	17	1.70 m (5 ft 7 in)	Richard	Mukachevo	Episode 2	15-14
Viktoriya 'Vika' Globa	21	1.70 m (5 ft 7 in)	Sonja	Zaporizhia	Episode 2	15-14
Anna 'Anya' Tihomirova	23	1.65 m (5 ft 5 in)	Sergey	Kyiv	Episode 3	13
Yuliya 'Yulya' Chernobyl	24	1.75 m (5 ft 9 in)	Sergey	Rivne	Episode 4	12
Olga 'Olya' Golub	21	1.76 m (5 ft 9 1/2 in)	Richard	Kharkiv	Episode 5	11
Alina Milyayeva	16	1.75 m (5 ft 9 in)	Sergey	Mykolaiv	Episode 6	10
Chiamaka 'Amy' Grace	26	1.75 m (5 ft 9 in)	Sonja	Kyiv	Episode 7	9
Irina 'Ira' Rotar	18	1.78 m (5 ft 10 in)	Richard	Kryvyi Rih	Episode 8	8
Yuliya 'Yulya' Mochalova	19	1.78 m (5 ft 10 in)	Sonja	Kyiv	Episode 10	7
Oleksandra 'Sasha' Kugat	21	1.75 m (5 ft 9 in)	Richard	Odesa	Episode 12	6
Oleksandra 'Sasha' Litvin	16	1.73 m (5 ft 8 in)	Sonja	Kyiv	Episode 13	5
Ekaterina 'Katya' Svinarchuk	17	1.67 m (5 ft 5 1/2 in)	Sonja	Chernivtsi	Episode 13	4
Svitlana 'Sveta' Kosovskaya	23	1.75 m (5 ft 9 in)	Richard	Odesa	Episode 15	3
Darya 'Dasha' Maystrenko	17	1.76 m (5 ft 9 1/2 in)	Sergey	Kaniv	Episode 15	2
Maria 'Masha' Grebenyuk	18	1.81 m (5 ft 11 1/2 in)	Richard	Kyiv	Episode 15	1

== Episodes ==
=== Episode 1 ===
Original airdate: August 26, 2016

This was the first casting episode.

=== Episode 2 ===
Original airdate: September 2, 2016

- Bottom two/eliminated: Vika Globa & Yulya Shchedrina

=== Episode 3 ===
Original airdate: September 9, 2016

- Bottom two: Anya Tihomirova & Olya Golub
- Eliminated: Anya Tihomirova

=== Episode 4 ===
Original airdate: September 16, 2016

- Challenge winner: Olya Golub
- Bottom two: Alina Milyayeva & Yulya Chornobil
- Eliminated: Yulya Chornobil

=== Episode 5 ===
Original airdate: September 23, 2016

- Challenge winner: Katya Svinarchuk
- Bottom two: Amy Grace & Olya Golub
- Eliminated: Olya Golub

=== Episode 6 ===
Original airdate: September 30, 2016

- Immune: Sveta Kosovska
- Bottom two: Alina Milyayeva & Ira Rotar
- Eliminated: Alina Milyayeva

=== Episode 7 ===
Original airdate: October 7, 2016

- Bottom two: Amy Grace & Sveta Kosovska
- Eliminated: Amy Grace

=== Episode 8 ===
Original airdate: October 14, 2016

- Immune: Dasha Maystrenko
- Bottom two: Ira Rotar & Sasha Kugat
- Eliminated: Ira Rotar

=== Episode 9 ===
Original airdate: October 21, 2016

- Challenge winner: Katya Svinarchuk
- Bottom two: Yulya Mochalova & Sveta Kosovska
- Eliminated: None

=== Episode 10 ===
Original airdate: October 28, 2016

- Immune: Sveta Kosovska & Masha Hrebenyuk
- Bottom two: Yulya Mochalova & Katya Svinarchuk
- Eliminated: Yulya Mochalova

=== Episode 11 ===
Original airdate: November 4, 2016

- Bottom two: Masha Hrebenyuk & Sveta Kosovska
- Eliminated: Masha Hrebenyuk

=== Episode 12 ===
Original airdate: November 11, 2016

- Eliminated: Sasha Kugat

=== Episode 13 ===
Original airdate: November 18, 2016

- Returned: Masha Hrebenyuk
- Eliminated outside of judging panel: Sasha Livtin

After that, the final 4 flown to Munich.

- Eliminated: Katya Svinarchuk

=== Episode 14 ===
Original airdate: November 25, 2016

- Eliminated: None

=== Episode 15 ===
Original airdate: December 2, 2016

- Final three: Dasha Maystrenko, Masha Hrebenyuk & Sveta Kosovska
- Eliminated: Sveta Kosovska
- Final two: Dasha Maystrenko & Masha Hrebenyuk
- Ukraine's Next Top Model: Masha Hrebenyuk

== Summaries ==
=== Results ===
Team Sergey	Team Richard	Team Sonja

Place	Model	Episodes														
Place	Model	2 (Note: Episode 1 was the casting episode, which carried over into the first half of episode 2.) (Note: At the beginning of episode 2, the pool of 20 semi-finalists was narrowed down to the final 15. During the first elimination, Yulya S. and Viktoriya were the last contestants to be judged, and were both selected as the worst performers. After the tie-breaking segment, Alla eliminated both of them.)	3	4	5	6	7 (Note: In episode 7, Sveta was originally safe from elimination. Alla met the girls after judging and announced that they would have to vote among themselves to choose a second candidate to join Amy for elimination. Sveta received 5 votes, and was put in danger of being eliminated.)	8 (Note: In episode 8, Darya was immune from elimination after performing the best at the runway challenge.)	9 (Note: In episode 9, Yulia M. was originally eliminated after the tie-breaking segment, but was allowed to remain in the competition.)	10	11	12	13 (Note: In episode 13, Maria was brought back into the competition. There were two separate eliminations. In the first, Sasha L. was eliminated outside of judging panel at the airport. In the second, Katya was eliminated.)		14 (Note: In episode 14, Darya was originally eliminated, but she was allowed to remain in the competition, because she was only contestant, who completed Sergey's task.)	15
1	Masha	SAFE	SAFE	SAFE	SAFE	SAFE	SAFE	SAFE	SAFE	IMM	OUT		LOW	LOW	SAFE	WINNER
2	Dasha	SAFE	SAFE	SAFE	SAFE	SAFE	SAFE	IMM	SAFE	SAFE	SAFE	SAFE	SAFE	SAFE	OUT	OUT
3	Sveta	SAFE	SAFE	SAFE	SAFE	IMM	LOW	SAFE	LOW	IMM	LOW	SAFE	SAFE	SAFE	SAFE	OUT
4	Katya	SAFE	SAFE	SAFE	SAFE	SAFE	SAFE	SAFE	SAFE	LOW	SAFE	LOW	SAFE	OUT		
5	Sasha L.	SAFE	SAFE	SAFE	SAFE	SAFE	SAFE	SAFE	SAFE	SAFE	SAFE	SAFE	OUT			
6	Sasha K.	SAFE	SAFE	SAFE	SAFE	SAFE	SAFE	LOW	SAFE	SAFE	SAFE	OUT				
7	Yulya M.	SAFE	SAFE	SAFE	SAFE	SAFE	SAFE	SAFE	OUT	OUT						
8	Ira	SAFE	SAFE	SAFE	SAFE	LOW	SAFE	OUT								
9	Amy	SAFE	SAFE	SAFE	LOW	SAFE	OUT									
10	Alina	SAFE	SAFE	LOW	SAFE	OUT										
11	Olya	SAFE	LOW	SAFE	OUT											
12	Yulya C.	SAFE	SAFE	OUT												
13	Anya	SAFE	OUT													
14-15	Vika	OUT														
14-15	Yulya S.	OUT														

The contestant was eliminated.
The contestant was in the bottom two.
The contestant was immune from elimination.
The contestant was originally eliminated, but was saved.
The contestant was eliminated outside of judging panel.
The contestant won the competition.

=== Photo shoot guide ===
- Episode 2 photo shoot: Posing with light sticks
- Episode 3 photo shoot: Inner World; Sports luxe in a stadium
- Episode 4 photo shoot: Acrobats with a male model
- Episode 5 photo shoot: Legs; Ice hockey players
- Episode 6 photo shoot: Posing on geometric shapes; Auto-washing
- Episode 7 photo shoot: Pin-up girls at a factory; Light in the darkness
- Episode 8 photo shoot: Lingerie in pairs
- Episode 9 photo shoot: Social media PSA
- Episode 10 photo shoot: Underwater fabric
- Episode 11 photo shoot: Seven deadly sins
- Episode 12 photo shoot: Cake body paint with male models, in vacuum space
- Episode 13 photo shoot: Steampunk fashion
- Episode 14 photo shoot: Photo shoot in the electric train; Five different backgrounds during 10 minutes; General photo shoot in the time mechanism; Salvador Dali's style
- Episode 15 photo shoot: Slavic mythology

== Judges ==
- Alla Kostromichova (host & head judge) - model
- Sergey Nikityuk (judge) - model scout
- Sonya Plakidyuk (judge) - fashion photographer
- Richard Gorn (judge) - fashion director
