= Supermodel po-ukrainsky season 1 =

Supermodel po-ukrainsky
- Season 1
- No. of episodes: 14

Release
- Original network: Novyi Kanal
- Original release: August 29 – November 28, 2014

Season chronology
- Next → Cycle 2

Supermodel po-ukrainsky, Cycle 1 was the first season of Supermodel po-ukrainsky. The first season features fifteen contestants, who will compete together for approximately fourteen weeks. The series itself immediately derives its format from Spanish modeling series Supermodelo. The show premiered on August 29, 2014.

The winner of the competition was 19-year-old Alyona Ruban from Dnipropetrovsk. As part of her prizes, she received the opportunity to star on the cover of Pink Magazine in Ukraine, as well as contracts with K Models and Marilyn Agency in Paris.

Anna-Kristina Prihodko, Karina Danilova, Karina Minayeva and Tatyana Brik would later return to compete for the tile in Top Model po-ukrainsky, cycle 7. Anna-Kristina Prihodko, Karina Danilova, Karina Minayeva were eliminated in Episode 1. Tanya Brik won Top Model po-ukrainsky 7.

== Series summary ==
=== Casting ===
The first round of castings was held in the cities of Kyiv and Odesa. The second round was held in the cities of Kharkiv, Dnipropetrovsk and Donetsk. 200 selected applicants from the auditions were narrowed down to 30 semi-finalists who received a callback. Of these 30, 15 were selected to be a part of the final cast.

=== Destinations ===
The destination for the season was in Lviv, the Carpathian Mountains at Yaremche and Odesa in Ukraine. The semi-final for the show took place in international destination of Paris.

== Casts ==
=== Contestants ===
(ages stated are at start of contest)

Contestant	Age	Height	Hometown	Finish	Place
Olena Radchenko	19	1.69 m (5 ft 6 1/2 in)	Donetsk	Episode 2	15
Debora Leonova	27	1.76 m (5 ft 9 1/2 in)	Odesa	Episode 3	14
Anastasiya 'Nastya' Morozova	16	1.74 m (5 ft 8 1/2 in)	Kyiv	Episode 4	13 (quit)
Yana Gribachova	16	1.75 m (5 ft 9 in)	Odesa	Episode 4	12
Karina Minayeva	23	1.76 m (5 ft 9 1/2 in)	Yevpatoria	Episode 5	11
Darina Tabachnik	22	1.80 m (5 ft 11 in)	Bucha	Episode 6	10
Irina 'Ira' Zhuravlyova	17	1.73 m (5 ft 8 in)	Alushta	Episode 8	9
Anna Nagornaya	20	1.75 m (5 ft 9 in)	Kharkiv	Episode 9	8
Valeriya 'Lera' Kosheriyeva	19	1.77 m (5 ft 9 1/2 in)	Mykolaiv	Episode 10	7
Vladyslava 'Vlada' Rogovenko	19	1.57 m (5 ft 2 in)	Dnipropetrovsk	Episode 11	6
Anna-Kristina Prihodko	20	1.75 m (5 ft 9 in)	Lviv	Episode 12	5
Karina Danilova	20	1.75 m (5 ft 9 in)	Kryvyi Rih	Episode 13	4
Tetyana 'Tanya' Bryk	16	1.78 m (5 ft 10 in)	Mykolaiv	Episode 14	3
Vladyslava 'Vlada' Pecheritsina	17	1.74 m (5 ft 8 1/2 in)	Donetsk	Episode 14	2
Alena Ruban	18	1.76 m (5 ft 9 1/2 in)	Dnipropetrovsk	Episode 14	1

=== Judges ===
- Alla Kostromichova (Host & Head judge) - Top model
- Sergey Nikityuk (Judge) - Model scout
- Sonya Plakidyuk (Judge) - Fashion photographer
- Richard Gorn (Judge) - Fashion director

== Episode summaries ==
=== Episode 1 ===
First aired: August 29, 2014

Sergey Nikityuk, Sonya Plakidyuk, and Richard Gorn shortlist thirty semi-finalists from 200 applicants that show up during the auditions. The number drops to 29 the following day, after 14-year-old Alina is disqualified from the competition due to being too young. The semi-finalists meet supermodel Alia Kostromichova for the first time. For their first photo shoot, they must pose in a photo booth and take four pictures that will impress the judges.

During elimination, the judges deliberate whilst the 29 girls socialize in a separate room. The room contains their best photo from the shoot on a large projector. Each girl they deem as not being worthy to move on in the competition has her picture on the screen blanked out, and must leave the room. Eventually only the final fifteen contestants remain in the room, thus becoming finalists.

=== Episode 2 ===
First aired: September 5, 2014

The models move into the hotel where they will remain during their stay in the competition. Conflict arises between Vlada R. and Nastya, when Anastasiya refuses to share the room with Vlada due to her loud, obnoxious personality. The following day, the contestants receive their makeovers. Many of the wind up in tears after their hair is cut. During the photo shoot, each girl is assigned a different flower based on her personality. They are given five minutes to get their photos taken. Back at home, a new augment ensues between Vlada R. and Nastya.

They later take part in a shopping mall fashion show before being judged at panel the following day. During elimination, Olena's 'too cool for school' attitude ultimately gets her eliminated from the competition.

- Eliminated: Olena Radchenko

=== Episode 3 ===
First aired: September 12, 2014

The models are introduced to Zvazheni ta schaslyvi (The Biggest Loser) nutritionist Svetlana Fus for a lesson on healthy eating and getting in shape. All the girls are measured and weighed, and given feedback on how to improve their fitness level and measurements. Vlada becomes involved in another argument with Karina M. after she steps in to defend Irina from some of the other girls comments about her weight.

The following day the contestants are brought to a construction site, which is the backdrop for their photo shoot. After arriving to the hotel, the girls find Alla waiting for them to begin a runway lesson. Later that afternoon, the contestants are challenged to a private runway show on a narrow catwalk. Panel takes place the following day. Ira is commended for her commitment to the photo shoot despite having been embarrassed. Debora is eliminated due to her lack of energy and stunted progress in the shoots.

- Immune from elimination: Anna Nagorna
- Eliminated: Debora Leonova

=== Episode 4 ===
First aired: September 19, 2014

The contestants are taken to a landfill for their photo shoot. Later they meet designer Jean Gritsfeldt for a styling challenge and Lera got immunity for winning the challenge. The next day, they take part in their second pre-panel runway show. Their task is to remain poised while wearing extra tall high heels. Anna-Kristina is revealed to have done the best, and she is given a pair of heels from the collection for her effort.

During panel, Karina receives the best feedback. Anastasiya decides to withdraw from the competition when her name is called up for critique, and Yana is eliminated from the competition. After the elimination, Alla asks that anyone who doesn't want to be in the competition must speak up immediately.

- Immune from elimination: Lera Kosherieva
- Quit: Nastya Morozova
- Eliminated: Yana Gribachova

=== Episode 5 ===
First aired: September 26, 2014

Richard Gorn wakes up the contestants and brings them outside. There they meet a personal trainer who revealed that the models will have to endure an obstacle course for their next challenge. Immediately after the obstacle course, the models must parade in front of a crowd. Irina is chosen as the crowds favorite.

After a workout session with the trainer, the models must pose as gymnasts with a male athlete for the photo shoot. At panel, Karina M's photo loses her a spot in the competition, and she is eliminated. After her elimination, Alla reveals that the girls will begin to travel to different destinations throughout Ukraine.

- Immune from elimination: Ira Zhuravlova
- Eliminated: Karina Minayeva

=== Episode 6 ===
First aired: October 3, 2014

- Immune from elimination: Anna Nagorna
- Eliminated: Darina Tabachnik

=== Episode 7 ===
First aired: October 10, 2014

- Immune from elimination: Vlada Rogovenko
- Eliminated: None

=== Episode 8 ===
First aired: October 17, 2014

- Eliminated outside of judging panel: Ira Zhuravlova
- Reinstated: Ira Zhuravlova
- Eliminated: Ira Zhuravlova

=== Episode 9 ===
First aired: October 24, 2014

- Immune from elimination: Anna-Kristina Prihodko
- Eliminated: Anna Nagorna

=== Episode 10 ===
First aired: October 31, 2014

- Eliminated: Lera Kosherieva

=== Episode 11 ===
First aired: November 7, 2014

- Eliminated: Vlada Rogovenko

=== Episode 12 ===
First aired: November 14, 2014

- Eliminated: Anna-Kristina Prihodko

=== Episode 13 ===
First aired: November 21, 2014

The final 4 flown to Paris, France.

- Eliminated: Karina Danilova

=== Episode 14 ===
First aired: November 21, 2014

- Eliminated outside of judging panel: Tanya Brik
- Final two: Alyona Ruban & Vlada Pecheritsina
- Ukraine's Next Top Model: Alyona Ruban

== Summaries ==
=== Results ===
Place	Model	Episodes												
Place	Model	2	3	4	5	6	7	8	9	10	11	12	13	14
1	Alena	SAFE	SAFE	SAFE	SAFE	SAFE	SAFE	SAFE	LOW	SAFE	IMM	SAFE	SAFE	WINNER
2	Vlada P.	LOW	SAFE	SAFE	LOW	LOW	SAFE	SAFE	SAFE	SAFE	SAFE	SAFE	LOW	OUT
3	Tanya	SAFE	SAFE	SAFE	SAFE	SAFE	SAFE	SAFE	SAFE	SAFE	SAFE	SAFE	SAFE	OUT
4	Karina D.	SAFE	SAFE	SAFE	SAFE	SAFE	SAFE	SAFE	SAFE	SAFE	SAFE	SAFE	OUT	
5	Anna-Kristina	SAFE	SAFE	SAFE	SAFE	SAFE	SAFE	SAFE	IMM	LOW	LOW	OUT		
6	Vlada R.	SAFE	SAFE	SAFE	SAFE	SAFE	IMM	SAFE	SAFE	SAFE	OUT			
7	Lera	SAFE	LOW	IMM	SAFE	SAFE	SAFE	LOW	SAFE	OUT				
8	Anna	SAFE	IMM	SAFE	SAFE	IMM	SAFE	LOW	OUT					
9	Ira	SAFE	SAFE	SAFE	IMM	SAFE	SAFE	OUT						
10	Darina	SAFE	SAFE	SAFE	SAFE	OUT								
11	Karina M.	SAFE	SAFE	SAFE	OUT									
12	Yana	SAFE	SAFE	OUT										
13	Nastya	SAFE	SAFE	QUIT										
14	Debora	SAFE	OUT											
15	Olena	OUT												

The contestant was eliminated
The contestant was in the bottom.
The contestant was immune from elimination
The contestant quit the competition
The contestant was originally eliminated from the competition but was saved
The contestant was eliminated outside of judging panel
The contestant won the competition

- Episode 1 was the casting episode. The top twenty-nine were left in a room with all their pictures from the shoot on a large screen. As the judges deliberated in a separate room, each semi-finalist they eliminated had her picture blanked out on the screen until only the final fifteen remained.
- In episode 4, Nastya decided to quit the competition when her name was called for judging.
- In episode 7, no one was eliminated.
- In episode 8, the girls were asked to vote on who they thought performed the worst at the photo shoot. Ira, Lera, and Anna were the only contestants to receive votes. Ira received the most votes against her at six, resulting in her elimination. However, the judges decided to give her a second chance. She was eliminated again after judging.
- In episode 12, all the girls were originally declared safe when their names were called for judging. After the girls met in the waiting room after panel had concluded, Alla stepped in to hand each girl an envelope containing a plane ticket to Paris. Anna-Khrystyna's envelope contained a ticket to her hometown, resulting in her elimination.
- In episode 14, Tanya was eliminated outside of judging panel before the final runway show. The judges deliberated on the results of the final shoot before judge Sergey Nikityuk came into their hotel room to reveal she'd been eliminated.

=== Photo shoot guide ===
- Episode 1 photo shoot: Portraying personality in a photo booth (casting)
- Episode 2 photo shoot: Embodying garden flowers
- Episode 3 photo shoot: Construction workers
- Episode 4 photo shoot: Broken objects in a landfill
- Episode 5 photo shoot: Athletes at the gym
- Episode 6 photo shoot: Wearing meat outfit in a slaughterhouse
- Episode 7 photo shoot: In a dungeon with reptiles and insects
- Episode 8 photo shoot: Nymphs in groups
- Episode 9 photo shoot: Medieval witch trials
- Episode 10 photo shoot: Sirens on a pile of fish
- Episode 11 photo shoots: Beauty shot with Jewelry; Roaring 20's Flappers
- Episode 12 photo shoots: Bonnie and Clyde; Sexual chemistry with male models
- Episode 13 photo shoots: Futuristic fashion; Southern French beauty
- Episode 14 photo shoots: Wind, water and fire
