= Top Model po-ukrainsky =

- Series logo
- Genre: Reality television
- Presented by: Alla Kostromichova
- Judges: Serhiy Nikitiuk; Sonia Plakydiuk; Volodimir Demchinsky
- Opening theme: "Oh, Something's Quiet" - J.Viewz (BeatMagik Remix) C. 1-3 "World is Waiting" - Letay C. 4-6 "Queen" - BMGPM C. 7
- Country of origin: Ukraine
- No. of seasons: 7

Production
- Running time: 120 minutes

Original release
- Network: Novyi Kanal
- Release: August 29, 2014 – December 18, 2020

Top Model po-ukrainsky, formerly known as Supermodel po-ukrainsky (Ukrainian:Супермодель по-українськи; English: Ukraine's Next Supermodel), is a Ukrainian reality television series which took its format from the Spanish reality show Supermodelo. The show placed a group of young contestants from Ukraine against each other in a variety of challenges to determine who will would title of the new 'Ukrainian supermodel' along with a lucrative modelling contract, and other prizes in the hope of a successful future in the modeling industry.

Beginning with season 4, the franchise adopted the Top Model format.

== Judges ==
The competition is hosted by supermodel Alla Kostromichova. The panel of the first cycle is composed of host Alla Kostromichova, along with Sergey Nikitiuk, Sonia Plakydiuk, and Richard Gorn.

Judges	Seasons						
Judges	1 (2014)	2 (2015)	3 (2016)	4 (2017)	5 (2018)	6 (2019)	7 (2020)
Alla Kostromichova	Head Judge	Head Judge	Head Judge	Head Judge	Head Judge	Head Judge	Head Judge
Richard Gorn	Main	Main	Main				
Sergey Nikitiuk	Main	Main	Main	Main	Main	Main	Main
Sonia Plakydiuk	Main	Main	Main	Main	Main	Main	Main
Konstantin Borovski				Main	Main		
Volodimir Demchinsky				Guest	Guest	Main	

== Cycles ==
Cycle	Premiere date	Winner	Runner-up	Other contestants in order of elimination	Number of contestants	International Destinations
1	29 August 2014	Alena Ruban	Vlada Pecheritsina	Olena Radchenko, Debora Leonova, Nastya Morozova (quit), Yana Gribachova, Karina Minayeva, Darina Tabachnik, Ira Zhuravlyova, Anna Nagornaya, Lera Kosheriyeva, Vlada Rogovenko, Anna-Kristina Prihodko, Karina Danilova, Tanya Bryk	15	Paris
2	28 August 2015	Alina Panyuta	Vika Maremuha	Sveta Melashych (quit), Katerina Yusupova, Katerina Lisenko, Masha Parsenyuk, Marina Kiryakova, Katya Kohanova, Nastya Tronko & Nantina Dronchak, Nina Krohmalyuk, Nastya Pushnya, Karina Zabolotnaya, Anya Sulima, Lera Miroshnichenko, Arina Lyubityelyeva	16	None
3	26 August 2016	Masha Grebenyuk	Dasha Maystrenko	Yulya Shchedrina & Vika Globa, Anna Tihomirova, Yulya Chernobyl, Olga Golub, Alina Milyayeva, Amy Greys, Ira Rotar, Yulya Mochalova, Sasha Kugat, Sasha Litvin, Katya Svinarchuk, Sveta Kosovskaya	15	Munich
4	1 September 2017	Samvel Tumanyan	Vika Rogalchuk	Karina Krilyuk, Dima Zabolotskiy, Ira Simchich, Misha Kukharchuk (quit), Vlad Dunayev, Nastya Panova, Liza Doronko, Awa Prigoda, Ira Moysak, Maks Sosnovskiy, Danylo Zolotov, Dima Kharlamov & Nastya Gladchenko, Masha Shevchenko, Stone Pistry, Olena Feofanova, Revan Palyukh, Svyat Boyko	20	Amsterdam
5	31 August 2018	Yana Kutishevskaya	Katya Polchenko	Ezedzhi Dzhonson Nnamdi, Ivan Kiyanitsa, Alisa Golovnyova, Sergey Gerdov, Sofi Beridze, Anna Troyan, Denys Kovalyov (quit), Yasya Krutova, Dima Toporinskiy (quit), Maks Osadchuk, Yehor Stepanenko, Yuliya Dyhan, Dima Sukach	15	Athens
6	30 August 2019	Malvina Chuklya	Natasha Maslovskaya	Karina Dyachuk, Darina Didovich (quit), Nastya Lazareva, Nataliya Savchenko, Masha Mikheeva, Nastya Leuhina, Yarina Samarik, Margo Verhovtseva, Liza Beskrovnaya, Amina Dosimbaeva, Yuliya Binkovskaya, Nastya Ruda, Darina Gerasimchuk, Katya Chechelenko, Katya Kulichenko	17	Antalya; Cappadocia; Denizli; Istanbul
7	16 October 2020	Tanya Bryk	Dasha Maystrenko & Sasha Litvin	Katya Svinarchuk & Liza Doronko & Karina Minaeva & Karina Danilova & Anya Sulima & Anna-Kristina Prihodko, Katya Chechelenko (disqualified), Nastya Leuhina (quit), Nastya Panova, Ira Rotar, Sofi Beridze & Vika Rogalchuk & Amina Dosimbaeva, Sasha Kugat (quit), Margo Verhovtseva, Arina Lyubiteleva, Ira Moysak	20	None

== Criticism and controversy ==
Season 1

In episode 12, contestants had to pose nude with 3 male models. Contestants Tatyana Bryk and Vlada Pecheritsina were under 18 years old and this fact was heavily criticised.

Contestant Vlada Pecheritsina was heavily criticised by fandom due to gossip that her lover was a producer on Novyy Channel and gifted her a place in the finale.

Season 2

In episode 2, contestant Sveta Melashych, quit competition after getting bullied by Anya Sulima and Arina Lyubityelyeva.

Season 3

In episode 13, contestant Maria Grebenyuk (who won competition later) returned to the competition. Her return was leaked in the teaser of this episode.

After Maria Grebenyuk was declared as the winner of the season 3, there was a blacklash from fans. They denied her win as, according to their opinion, Daria Maystrenko, who was placed 2nd, should have won competition.

Season 4

Before season 4, a re-branding happened and male contestants were able to participate in UNTM as well. However, this fact caused critics by fans as there was attention to the relationships between contestants, rather to the modeling.

Contestant, Olena Feofanova, said that Top Model po-ukrainsky was a mental disaster to her as she was bullied by the production, contestants and judges.

Season 5

Before season 5, Alyona Zvirik (the creative director of the UNTM), left the UNTM team. As the result, seasons 5-7 were filmed without her participation, despite the fact that in seasons 5-6 she was mentioned as creative director of the UNTM.

Season 5 was heavily criticised for violence and bullying. As the result, the vote "Who should participate in new season?" before season 6 was organised.

Another point of season 5 criticism was another gossip, similar to Vlada's (season 1 contestant) one. According to that gossip, Katya Polchenko, who was placed 2nd, had a lover. This time it is a famous designer, Harry Poragotsy.

Contestant Maxim Osadchuk said that he had sex with some members of UNTM stuff, so he moved to the top 6.

Season 6

In episode 7, there was a night fight happened, which was awful. This was heavily criticised by fans. As the result, before season 7, a rule, which prohibits violence, was included.

The winner of the season, Malvina Chuklya, was supposed to get a contract with KModels, ₴100000 and excursion to the New-York. However, she did get only ₴100000 as her prise, while her flight was supposed to happen in spring 2020. She mentioned that Top Model po-ukrainsky has fooled her.

Season 7

Before season 7, a huge budget cut happened. Furthermore, this was the only season, filmed during Covid-19.

Contestants Ira Simchich, Katya Polchenko and Alisa Golovnyova were supposed to participate in this season. However, they were declined. For example, Ira Simchich was replaced by Ira Moysak the day before the beginning of the filming.

In episode 2, contestant Katya Chechelenko was disqualified from the competition due to unacceptable behavior on the photoshoot. However, this disqualification was heavily criticised by fandom as photographer harassed to her and there is no Katya's fault.

In episode 7, Daria Maystrenko returned to the competition. However, her return was leaked in the trailer of the season. Besides, her return was negatively accepted by fans as during previous four episodes she had done nothing in terms of progress. Furthermore, her return was fake as she didn't want to return to the UNTM.

Contestant, Anastasia Leuhina said that UNTM ruined her and caused anorexia.
