= Supermodel po-ukrainsky season 2 =

Supermodel po-ukrainsky
- Season 2
- No. of episodes: 15

Release
- Original network: Novyi Kanal
- Original release: August 28 – December 4, 2015

Season chronology
- ← Previous; Cycle 1 Next → Cycle 3

Supermodel po-ukrainsky, season 2 was the second season of Supermodel po-ukrainsky. The season featured fifteen contestants, along with an additional sixteenth who entered as a replacement, who competed together for approximately fourteen weeks. The series itself immediately derives its format from Spanish modeling series Supermodelo. The season premiered on August 28, 2015.

The winner of the competition was 16-year-old Alina Panyuta from Donetsk. As part of her prizes, she received the opportunity to star on the cover of Pink Magazine in Ukraine, as well as contracts with K Models and Next Management in Milan.

Anya Sulima and Arina Lyubityelyeva would later return to compete for the tile in Top Model po-ukrainsky, cycle 7. Anya Sulima was elminited im Episode 1. Arina Lyubityelyeva was eliminated in Episode 9.

== Series summary ==
=== Casting ===
In contrast to the previous season, online submissions were allowed. Live castings were held in the cities of Lviv, Dnipropetrovsk, Odesa and Kyiv from February to March 2015. 200 selected applicants from the auditions were narrowed down to 30 semi-finalists who received a callback. Of these 30, 15 were selected to be a part of the final cast.

=== Destinations ===
The destination for the season was in Chernivtsi, Lviv, Zhytomyr and Odesa in Ukraine. This season does not have an international destination.

== Contestants ==
(ages stated are at start of contest)

Contestant	Age	Height	Hometown	Finish	Place
Svitlana 'Sveta' Melashych	21	1.71 m (5 ft 7 1/2 in)	Kyiv	Episode 2	16 (quit)
Katerina Yusupova	24	1.81 m (5 ft 11 1/2 in)	Kyiv	Episode 2	15
Katerina Lisenko	27	1.75 m (5 ft 9 in)	Kyiv	Episode 3	14
Mariya 'Masha' Parsenyuk	22	1.74 m (5 ft 8 1/2 in)	Kyiv	Episode 4	13
Marina Kiryakova	25	1.71 m (5 ft 7 1/2 in)	Odesa	Episode 6	12
Katerina 'Katya' Kohanova	17	1.70 m (5 ft 7 in)	Odesa	Episode 7	11
Anastasiya 'Nastya' Tronko	19	1.74 m (5 ft 8 1/2 in)	Sumy	Episode 8	10–9
Nantina Dronchak	19	1.75 m (5 ft 9 in)	Vinnytsia	Episode 8	10–9
Nineviya-Viltraud 'Nina' Krohmalyuk	20	1.76 m (5 ft 9 1/2 in)	Vinnytsia	Episode 9	8
Anastasiya 'Nastya' Pushnya	22	1.77 m (5 ft 9 1/2 in)	Kryvyi Rih	Episode 10	7
Karina Zabolotnaya	19	1.72 m (5 ft 7 1/2 in)	Khmelnytskyi	Episode 11	6
Hanna 'Anya' Sulima	17	1.72 m (5 ft 7 1/2 in)	Kryvyi Rih	Episode 12	5
Valeriya 'Lera' Miroshnichenko	20	1.75 m (5 ft 9 in)	Sumy	Episode 14	4
Arina Lyubityelyeva	17	1.80 m (5 ft 11 in)	Kryvyi Rih	Episode 15	3
Viktoriya 'Vika' Maremuha	25	1.66 m (5 ft 5 1/2 in)	Vinnytsia	Episode 15	2
Alina Panyuta	16	1.80 m (5 ft 11 in)	Donetsk	Episode 15	1

== Episodes ==
=== Episode 1 ===
Original airdate: August 28, 2015

This was the casting episode. Out of 30 semi-finalists the top 15 contestants were chosen.

=== Episode 2 ===
Original airdate: September 4, 2015

- Quit: Sveta Melashych
- Replacement: Alina Panyuta
- Eliminated: Katerina Yusupova

=== Episode 3 ===
Original Airdate: September 11, 2015

- Challenge winner: Lera Miroshnichenko
- Immune from elimination: Lera Miroshnichenko
- Eliminated: Katerina Lisenko

=== Episode 4 ===
Original Airdate: September 18, 2015

- Challenge winner: Vika Maremuha
- Immune from elimination: Vika Maremuha
- Eliminated: Mariya Parsenyuk

=== Episode 5 ===
Original Airdate: September 25, 2015

- Challenge winners: Nastya Tronko, Katya Kohanova, Karina Zabolotna, Marina Kiryakova, Nina Krohmalyuk & Vika Maremuha
- Immune from elimination: Nastya Tronko, Katya Kohanova, Karina Zabolotna, Marina Kiryakova, Nina Krohmalyuk & Vika Maremuha
- Originally eliminated: Arina Lyubityelyeva

=== Episode 6 ===
Original Airdate: October 2, 2015

- Challenge winner: Marina Kiryakova
- Eliminated: Marina Kiryakova

=== Episode 7 ===
Original Airdate: October 9, 2015

- Challenge winner: Anya Sulima
- Eliminated: Katya Kohanova

=== Episode 8 ===
Original Airdate: October 16, 2015

- Challenge winner: Nina Krohmalyuk
- Immune from elimination: Nina Krohmalyuk
- Eliminated: Nastya Tronko & Nantina Dronchak

=== Episode 9 ===
Original Airdate: October 23, 2015

- Challenge winner: Karina Zabolotna
- Immune from elimination: Karina Zabolotna
- Bottom two (chosen by the contestants): Anya Sulima & Nina Krohmalyuk
- Eliminated: Nina Krohmalyuk

=== Episode 10 ===
Original Airdate: October 30, 2015

- Eliminated: Milana Pushnya
- Special guest: Vlada Rogovenko

=== Episode 11 ===
Original Airdate: November 6, 2015

- Challenge winner: Alina Panyuta
- Eliminated: Karina Zabolotna

=== Episode 12 ===
Original Airdate: November 13, 2015

- Challenge winner: Vika Maremuha
- Eliminated: Anya Sulima

=== Episode 13 ===
Original Airdate: November 20, 2015

- Challenge winners: Alina Panyuta, Arina Lyubityelyeva, Lera Miroshnichenko & Vika Maremuha
- Eliminated: None

=== Episode 14 ===
Original Airdate: November 27, 2015

- Challenge winner: Vika Maremuha
- Eliminated: Lera Miroshnichenko

=== Episode 15 ===
Original Airdate: December 4, 2015

- Final three: Alina Panyuta, Arina Lyubityelyeva & Vika Maremuha
- Eliminated: Arina Lyubityelyeva
- Final two: Alina Panyuta & Vika Maremuha
- Ukraine's Next Top Model: Alina Panyuta
- Special prize, year's supply of cosmetics Inglot: Anya Sulima

== Summaries ==
=== Results ===
Place	Model	Episodes														
Place	Model	1 (Note: Episode 1 was the casting episode. The top thirty were left in a lounge while the judges deliberated in a separate room. As the judges made their decision about each girl in real time, she was either eliminated or admitted into the final fifteen.)	2 (Note: In episode 2, Sveta quit the competition. Alina, who'd been eliminated as a semifinalist, entered the competition as her replacement.)	3 (Note: In episode 3, Lera was immune from elimination for winning the runway challenge.)	4 (Note: In episode 4, Vika was immune from elimination for winning the posing challenge.)	5 (Note: In episode 5, Anastasia T., Karina, Katya, Maryna, Nina & Vika were immune from elimination for winning the dance team challenge. Arina was originally eliminated, but was allowed to remain in the competition.)	6	7 (Note: In episode 7, Anna was immune from elimination for winning the makeup challenge.)	8 (Note: In episode 8, Nina was immune from elimination for winning the runway challenge.)	9 (Note: In episode 9, the girls were asked to vote on who they thought performed the worst at the photo shoot. Anna and Nina were the contestants with the most votes. The judges decided to save Anna and eliminate Nina. Also Karina was immune from elimination for winning the runway challenge.)	10	11	12	13 (Note: In episode 13, nobody was eliminated.)	14	15
1	Alina	OUT	SAFE	SAFE	SAFE	SAFE	SAFE	SAFE	SAFE	SAFE	IMM	SAFE	SAFE	SAFE	SAFE	WINNER
2	Vika	SAFE	LOW	SAFE	IMM	IMM	SAFE	SAFE	SAFE	SAFE	SAFE	SAFE	SAFE	OUT	LOW	OUT
3	Arina	SAFE	SAFE	LOW	SAFE	OUT	SAFE	SAFE	SAFE	SAFE	SAFE	SAFE	LOW	SAFE	SAFE	OUT
4	Lera	SAFE	SAFE	IMM	SAFE	SAFE	SAFE	LOW	SAFE	SAFE	SAFE	SAFE	SAFE	LOW	OUT	
5	Anya	SAFE	SAFE	SAFE	SAFE	SAFE	LOW	IMM	SAFE	LOW	LOW	LOW	OUT			
6	Karina	SAFE	SAFE	SAFE	SAFE	IMM	SAFE	SAFE	LOW	IMM	SAFE	OUT				
7	Nastya P.	SAFE	SAFE	SAFE	SAFE	SAFE	SAFE	SAFE	SAFE	SAFE	OUT					
8	Nina	SAFE	SAFE	SAFE	SAFE	IMM	LOW	SAFE	IMM	OUT						
9-10	Nantina	SAFE	SAFE	SAFE	SAFE	SAFE	SAFE	LOW	OUT							
9-10	Nastya T.	SAFE	SAFE	SAFE	LOW	IMM	SAFE	SAFE	OUT							
11	Katya	SAFE	SAFE	SAFE	SAFE	IMM	SAFE	OUT								
12	Marina	SAFE	SAFE	SAFE	SAFE	IMM	OUT									
13	Masha	SAFE	SAFE	SAFE	OUT											
14	Katerina L.	SAFE	SAFE	OUT												
15	Katerina Y.	SAFE	OUT													
16	Sveta	SAFE	QUIT													

The contestant quit the competition
The contestant was eliminated
The contestant was immune from elimination
The contestant was originally eliminated, but was saved
The contestant won the competition

=== Photo shoot guide ===
- Episode 1 photo shoot: Posing with letters from the show's logo (casting)
- Episode 2 photo shoots: Splattered with paint; posing with instruments
- Episode 3 photo shoot: Posing at the end of the runway
- Episode 4 photo shoot: Dynamic posing in edgy clothing
- Episode 5 photo shoot: Native dance styles from around the world
- Episode 6 photo shoot: Levitation
- Episode 7 photo shoot: Broken doll campaign against domestic violence
- Episode 8 photo shoot: Campaign for being attentive on the road with noisy passengers
- Episode 9 photo shoot: Underwater cosmic shoot
- Episode 10 photo shoot: Bats hanging upside down
- Episode 11 photo shoot: Animorphs in body paint
- Episode 12 photo shoot: Gladiators with male models
- Episode 13 photo shoot: Pirates on a ship
- Episode 14 photo shoot: Patients in an insane asylum
- Episode 15 photo shoots: Charlie Chaplin; Battle of the princesses in the air; Luxury on a yacht for Pink magazine

== Judges ==
- Alla Kostromichova (Host & Head judge) - Top model
- Sergey Nikityuk (Judge) - Model scout
- Sonya Plakidyuk (Judge) - Fashion photographer
- Richard Gorn (Judge) - Fashion director
