= Top Model po-ukrainsky season 4 =

Top Model po-ukrainsky
- Season 4
- No. of episodes: 18

Release
- Original network: Novyi Kanal
- Original release: September 1 – December 29, 2017

Season chronology
- ← Previous; Cycle 3 Next → Cycle 5

Top Model po-ukrainsky, cycle 4 is the fourth season of Top Model po-ukrainsky. In contrast to the previous three seasons, the show introduced a division of also male models have a change of winning the competition.

The winner of the competition was 19-year-old Samvel Tumanyan. As part of his prizes, he received: a contracts with K Models, a cash prize of 100,000₴, and a trip to New York City. Beside, he and Vika will have the opportunity to star on the cover of Pink Magazine in Ukraine.

Anastasiya Panova, Ira Moysak, Vika Rogalchuk and Liza Doronko would later return to compete for the tile in Top Model po-ukrainsky, cycle 7. Liza Doronko was eliminated in Episode 1. Anastasiya Panova was eliminated in Episode 3. Vika Rogalchuk was eliminated in Episode 6. Ira Moysak was eliminated in Episode 9.

== Contestants ==
(ages stated are at start of contest)

Contestant	Age	Height	Hometown	Outcome	Place
Karina Krilyuk	19	1.80 m (5 ft 11 in)	Rivne	Episode 2	20
Dmytro 'Dima' Zabolotskyi	21	1.89 m (6 ft 2 1/2 in)	Melitopol	Episode 3	19
Irina 'Ira' Simchich	19	1.74 m (5 ft 8 1/2 in)	Ivano-Frankivsk	Episode 4	18
Mykhaylo 'Misha' Kukharchuk	20	1.83 m (6 ft 0 in)	Rivne	Episode 5	17 (quit)
Vladyslav 'Vlad' Dunayev	18	1.83 m (6 ft 0 in)	Kaniv	Episode 5	16
Anastasiya 'Nastya' Panova	22	1.76 m (5 ft 9 1/2 in)	Kryvyi Rih	Episode 6	15
Yelizaveta 'Liza' Doronko	19	1.81 m (5 ft 11 1/2 in)	Kharkiv	Episode 7	14
Katerina 'Awa' Prigoda	24	1.70 m (5 ft 7 in)	Poltava	Episode 9	13
Irina 'Ira' Moysak	20	1.76 m (5 ft 9 1/2 in)	Stryi	Episode 10	12
Maksym 'Maks' Sosnovskiy	23	1.86 m (6 ft 1 in)	Mohyliv-Podilskyi	Episode 10	11
Danylo Zolotov	20	1.87 m (6 ft 1 1/2 in)	Sievierodonetsk	Episode 11	10
Dmytro 'Dima' Kharlamov	21	1.84 m (6 ft 1/2 in)	Kremenchuk	Episode 13	9-8
Anastsiya 'Nastya' Gladchenko	18	1.74 m (5 ft 8 1/2 in)	Dnipro	Episode 13	9-8
Mariya 'Masha' Shevchenko	19	1.85 m (6 ft 1 in)	Lynovytsya	Episode 14	7
Serhiy 'Stone' Pistry	22	1.85 m (6 ft 1 in)	Bila Tserkva	Episode 15	6
Olena Feofanova	20	1.70 m (5 ft 7 in)	Donetsk	Episode 16	5
Revan Palyukh	19	1.94 m (6 ft 4 1/2 in)	Lviv	Episode 17	4
Svyatoslav 'Svyat' Boyko	27	1.83 m (6 ft 0 in)	Stryi	Episode 17	3
Viktoriya 'Vika' Rogalchuk	17	1.69 m (5 ft 6 1/2 in)	Kyiv	Episode 18	2
Samvel Tumanyan	19	1.85 m (6 ft 1 in)	Hostomel	Episode 18	1

== Episodes ==
=== Episode 1 ===
Original airdate: September 1, 2017

This was the first casting episode.

=== Episode 2 ===
Original airdate: September 8, 2017

- Best photo: Masha Shevchenko
- Immune: Awa Prigoda & Liza Doronko
- Bottom two: Danylo Zolotov & Karina Krilyuk
- Eliminated: Karina Krilyuk

=== Episode 3 ===
Original airdate: September 15, 2017

- Challenge winner/Immune: Stone Pistry
- Best photo: Danylo Zolotov
- Bottom two: Dima Zabolotsky & Svyat Boyko
- Eliminated: Dima Zabolotsky

=== Episode 4 ===
Original airdate: September 22, 2017

- Immune: Stone Pistry
- Best photo: Misha Kukharchuk
- Bottom four: Danylo Zolotov, Ira Simchich, Maks Sosnovsky & Vika Rogalchuk
- Eliminated: Ira Simchich

=== Episode 5 ===
Original airdate: September 29, 2017

- Immune: Stone Pistry
- Quit: Misha Kukharchuk
- Bottom two: Awa Prigoda & Vlad Dunayev
- Eliminated: Vlad Dunayev

=== Episode 6 ===
Original airdate: October 6, 2017

- Bottom two: Nastya Panova & Danylo Zolotov
- Eliminated: Nastya Panova

=== Episode 7 ===
Original airdate: October 13, 2017

- Immune: Vika Rogalchuk
- Bottom two: Maks Sosnovsky & Liza Doronko
- Eliminated: Liza Doronko

=== Episode 8 ===
Original airdate: October 20, 2017

- Immune: Ira Moysak
- Bottom two: Stone Pistry and Samvel Tumanyan
- Eliminated: None^{1}

=== Episode 9 ===
Original airdate: October 27, 2017

- Bottom two: Awa Prigoda & Masha Shevchenko
- Eliminated: Awa Prigoda

=== Episode 10 ===
Original airdate: November 3, 2017

- Eliminated outside of judging panel: Ira Moysak
- Bottom two: Maks Sosnovsky & Stone Pistry
- Eliminated: Maks Sosnovsky

=== Episode 11 ===
Original airdate: November 10, 2017

- Bottom two: Danylo Zolotov & Masha Shevchenko
- Eliminated: Danylo Zolotov

=== Episode 12 ===
Original airdate: November 17, 2017

- Bottom two: Dima Kharlamov & Revan Palyukh
- Eliminated: None

=== Episode 13 ===
Original airdate: November 24, 2017

- Bottom four: Nastya Gladchenko, Dima Kharlamov, Revan Palyukh & Stone Pistry
- Eliminated: Nastya Gladchenko & Dima Kharlamov

=== Episode 14 ===
Original airdate: December 1, 2017

- Immune from elimination: Samvel Tumanyan
- Eliminated: Masha Shevchenko^{2}

=== Episode 15 ===
Original airdate: December 8, 2017

- Bottom two: Stone Pistry & Vika Rogalchuk
- Eliminated: Stone Pistry

=== Episode 16 ===
Original airdate: December 15, 2017

- Bottom two: Olena Feofanova & Samvel Tumanyan
- Eliminated: Olena Feofanova

=== Episode 17 ===
Original airdate: December 22, 2017

- Eliminated outside of judging panel: Revan Palyukh
- Eliminated: Svyat Boyko

=== Episode 18 ===
Original airdate: December 29, 2017

- Final two: Samvel Tumanyan & Vika Rogalchuk
- Eliminated: Vika Rogalchuk
- Ukraine's Next Top Model: Samvel Tumanyan

^1: This elimination round was unusual because Samvel and Stone compete as the best models of this week.
^2: Originally, Masha and Olena were the bottom two, but due to Masha injured her leg, judges decided not to make a "second chance" (because it was connected with footwork). That's why, Masha was eliminated and Olena was safe.

== Summaries ==
=== Results ===
Place	Model	Episodes																
Place	Model	2 (Note: In episode 2, Stone won the challenge and was granted immunity for 3 episodes (including the episode he won it in).)	3 (Note: In episode 3, Svyat was the captain of his team and controlled who went from his team at each time. Due to timing constraints, he was unable to produce a photo for himself which ultimately landed him in the bottom two.)	4	5 (Note: In episode 5, Misha quit the competition.)	6	7	8 (Note: In episode 8, judges chose Samvel & Stone as the bottom two. At first, it was said that Samvel is leaving the project, but it was announced that it wasn't a bottom two fight. It was a fight for a photo in a famous journal. Nobody left the competition.)	9	10	11	12	13	14 (Note: In episode 14, judges chose Masha & Olena as the bottom two. It was said that Masha is leaving the project, because she injured her leg and she can't take part in the project anymore.)	15	16	17	18
1	Samvel	SAFE	SAFE	SAFE	SAFE	SAFE	SAFE	OUT	SAFE	SAFE	SAFE	SAFE	SAFE	IMM	SAFE	LOW	LOW	WINNER
2	Vika	SAFE	SAFE	LOW	SAFE	SAFE	IMM	SAFE	SAFE	SAFE	SAFE	SAFE	SAFE	SAFE	LOW	SAFE	SAFE	OUT
3	Svyat	SAFE	LOW	SAFE	SAFE	SAFE	SAFE	SAFE	SAFE	SAFE	SAFE	SAFE	SAFE	SAFE	SAFE	SAFE	OUT	
4	Revan	SAFE	SAFE	SAFE	SAFE	SAFE	SAFE	SAFE	SAFE	SAFE	SAFE	OUT	LOW	SAFE	SAFE	SAFE	OUT	
5	Olena	SAFE	SAFE	SAFE	SAFE	SAFE	SAFE	SAFE	SAFE	SAFE	SAFE	SAFE	SAFE	LOW	SAFE	OUT		
6	Stone	SAFE	IMM	IMM	IMM	SAFE	SAFE	LOW	SAFE	LOW	SAFE	SAFE	LOW	SAFE	OUT			
7	Masha	SAFE	SAFE	SAFE	SAFE	SAFE	SAFE	SAFE	LOW	SAFE	LOW	SAFE	SAFE	OUT				
8-9	Nastya G.	SAFE	SAFE	SAFE	SAFE	SAFE	SAFE	SAFE	SAFE	SAFE	SAFE	SAFE	OUT					
8-9	Dima K.	SAFE	SAFE	SAFE	SAFE	SAFE	SAFE	SAFE	SAFE	SAFE	SAFE	LOW	OUT					
10	Danylo	LOW	SAFE	LOW	SAFE	LOW	SAFE	SAFE	SAFE	SAFE	OUT							
11	Maks	SAFE	SAFE	LOW	SAFE	SAFE	LOW	SAFE	SAFE	OUT								
12	Ira M.	SAFE	SAFE	SAFE	SAFE	SAFE	SAFE	IMM	SAFE	OUT								
13	Awa	IMM	SAFE	SAFE	LOW	SAFE	SAFE	SAFE	OUT									
14	Liza	IMM	SAFE	SAFE	SAFE	SAFE	OUT											
15	Nastya P.	SAFE	SAFE	SAFE	SAFE	OUT												
16	Vlad	SAFE	SAFE	SAFE	OUT													
17	Misha	SAFE	SAFE	SAFE	QUIT													
18	Ira S.	SAFE	SAFE	OUT														
19	Dima Z.	SAFE	OUT															
20	Karina	OUT																

The contestant was eliminated outside of judging panel
The contestant was eliminated
The contestant quit the competition
The contestant was in the bottom two.
The contestant was immune from elimination
The contestant won the competition

=== Photo shoot guide ===
- Episode 2 photo shoot: Bath, Madhouse killers
- Episode 3 photo shoot: Chess pieces in pairs
- Episode 4 photo shoots: Spyers, Insects caught in a spider web; car crash victims
- Episode 5 photo shoot: Posing with animals in enclosed spaces
- Episode 6 photo shoots: Podolyan lookbook; cancer victims
- Episode 8 photo shoot: Posing nude on a bus
- Episode 9 motion shoot: Motion editorial
- Episode 10 photo shoots: Aliens vs humans; comic book robbers; gender swap
- Episode 11 photo shoot: Executions
- Episode 12 photo shoots: Posing as animals from the primal Zodiac; Funsies campaign at a pool party
- Episode 13 photo shoots: Posing in shadows; embodying critters
- Episode 14 photo shoot: The rules of safe swimming, Posing at the side of a plane
- Episode 15 photo shoot: With children, Campaign against domestic violence
- Episode 16 photo shoot: Portraying African Gods/Goddesses, underwater orchestra
- Episode 17 photo shoots: Colonial Style; Posing on a windmill; BDSM-styled with Alla Kostromichova
