= Alla Kostromichova =

Ukrainian model (born 1986)

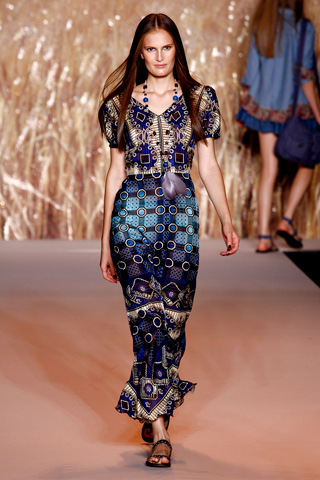
- Kostromichova walking for Anna Sui in 2010
- Born: Alla Kostromichova; 11 June 1986 (age 40); Sevastopol, Ukrainian SSR, Soviet Union
- Occupations: Model; Actress; Designer
- Years active: Since 2007
- Spouse: Jason Capone
- Children: 2
- Modeling information
- Height: 1.78 m (5 ft 10 in)
- Hair color: Brown
- Eye color: Grey

Alla Kostromichova (Ukrainian Алла Костромiчова; born 11 June 1986) is a Ukrainian model and TV presenter. Kostromichova has been working with leading fashion houses since 2009 and has appeared on covers and advertising campaigns in numerous Ukrainian and international magazines, including Harper's Bazaar, Marie Claire, and Vogue.

== Biography ==
Kostomichova was born in Sevastopol, Ukrainian Soviet Socialist Republic. She graduated from Sevastopol National Technical University.

Aged 20, Kostomichova signed a contract with Why Not modelling agency in Milan. In 2008, she temporarily moved to France to work with Givenchy. The same year, she made her catwalk debut at New York Fashion Week, where she presented Alexander McQueen, Christian Dior, Nina Ricci, Roberto Cavalli, Hermès, Balenciaga, and Valentino.

In 2014, Kostromichova became the host of the reality show Top Model po-ukrainsky.

== Career ==
In June 2019, she became the face of the Jean Paul Gaultier's brand.

== Personal life ==
Kostromichova is married to Jason Capone and has two children.
