= Italia's Next Top Model season 3 =

Italia's Next Top Model
- Season 3
- No. of episodes: 12

Release
- Original network: SKY Vivo
- Original release: October 2 – December 18, 2009

Season chronology
- ← Previous; Season 2 Next → Season 4

The third season of Italia's Next Top Model, an Italian reality television show, premiered on SKY Vivo on 2 October 2009 and concluded on 18 December 2009.

The show was once again hosted by former Russian model and actress Natasha Stefanenko. The permanent judges included Michael Giannini, art director and talent scout for the modeling agency d’Management; former model Nadège du Bospertus; and fashion journalist Giusi Ferré. Each episode featured a celebrity guest judge joining the panel.

The season was won by 24-year-old Anastasia Silveri, who received a one-year contract with d’Management Group and a Max Factor campaign worth €150,000.

== Changes ==
The cast was expanded to 16 contestants in the first episode; however, it was later revealed that, according to the show’s rules, only 14 would move into the model house, resulting in two contestants being eliminated in the premiere and excluded from the show's opening sequence.

A live audience was introduced during the weekly judging sessions and elimination ceremonies, with the five judges openly voting against the contestant they wished to eliminate from the bottom two. Additionally, the two contestants facing elimination had to compete in a runway challenge before the audience, allowing the judges to determine who was more deserving to stay in the competition. These changes were met with skepticism and general disappointment from viewers.

Due to these format changes, the weekly reward challenges were no longer featured in the main episodes but were instead shown in daily daytime video segments. This was also the first season to feature related contestants, with twin sisters Gilda and Veronica Testa competing.

== Episode summaries ==
=== Episode 1 ===
First aired 2 October 2009

After months of auditions involving more than 1,500 contestants, the 16 girls chosen for the competition met on Via Montenapoleone, the premier fashion street in Milan. They were briefly introduced through short clips, and once the group was complete, they were instructed to join host Natasha Stefanenko and Michael Giannini, art director of d’Management, at the location where their first elimination challenge would take place.

Michael informs the contestants that they have fifteen minutes to select an outfit and apply their makeup. They must prepare for an impromptu runway show in the city center, with an audience composed of passersby. During the show, Elisa captures public attention by wearing a transparent top without underwear, while Jade stands out with her striking Barbie-like appearance.

The episode then moves to the studio, where, for this season, the models' evaluations will take place before a live audience. The 16 contestants are introduced, and Michela Maggioni, winner of Season 2, makes her entrance. A video is shown highlighting the start of her career as a model following her victory, featuring photoshoots for major fashion magazines such as Marie Claire and Harper's Bazaar, as well as her appearances in runway shows in Milan and Singapore.

The contestants' performances on the runway are then evaluated in the studio, with a focus on the weakest performers. Maggioni then escorts the girls out of the studio and to the models' house, which will also serve as their "Model School" for the season. The judges deliberate on the models' performances, praising Elisa for her boldness and Anastasia for her runway performance. Meanwhile, contestants such as Athina, Eleonora, Giada, and Veronica V. are criticized.

From the studio, Natasha proceeds to announce to Michela the names of the girls who will make it into the house, entrusting her with the task of delivering the photos before the front door of the Model School. Athina, Giada, and Veronica V. are placed in the bottom three due to their unimpressive walks and poor outfit choices. Giada is called but is informed that she will be eliminated, while Athina is invited to pick up her photo, indicating she has been chosen to enter the models' house. Veronica V. is also eliminated.

- Bottom three: Athina Covassi, Giada Combusti, and Veronica Valentini
- Eliminated: Giada Combusti and Veronica Valentini
- Guest judges: Martina Colombari, Italian model and actress

=== Episode 2 ===
First aired 9 October 2009

The 14 aspiring models are brought to the Charme&Cheveux salon to receive their makeovers. Most of the girls are excited and happy, but Caroline expresses dissatisfaction with the outcome and complains, also revealing that she is upset about hurting her back just before being taken to the salon. Athina, on the other hand, quietly cries as her hair is cut short.

The following day, the girls receive a message from Natasha instructing them to get ready, as they will be taken to the Milan Military Academy. Upon arrival, they are welcomed by soldiers and dressed in military uniforms. A coach then pushes them to complete a military training exercise, during which they get covered in mud. Once the task is completed, the girls participate in their first photoshoot, posing as sexy soldiers in a jeep. Most of the girls manage to deliver strong photos.

In the judging studio, before an audience, Anastasia, Caroline, Jade, and Sabrina are praised for their work, while Athina, Carlotta, Diletta, Elisa, and Veronica are considered to have been the weakest performers of the week.

In the end, the judges place Athina and Carlotta in the bottom two for their stiff poses. The two girls face each other in a runway challenge to determine who deserves to stay in the competition. With an open verdict, Athina receives three out of five votes from the judging panel, with Natasha, Michael, and Giusi choosing her to leave the competition for being less convincing on the runway.

- Bottom two: Athina Covassi and Carlotta Castagneris
- Eliminated: Athina Covassi
- Guest judge: Giampiero Mughini, former journalist
- Special guest: Ciccio Graziani, football coach
- Featured photographer: Nancy Fina

=== Episode 3 ===
First aired 16 October 2009

The 13 remaining girls are awakened at 5 a.m. by the sound of a siren, signaling a message from Natasha. The message informs them that they will be participating in this week’s runway challenge, which will determine who will be eliminated.

The girls are taken to the fashion district of Milan, to an area under construction, where they are welcomed by Natasha and fashion designer John Richmond, who will oversee their runway challenge. After preparing, the contestants showcase their progress in walking, though some fail to impress.

The episode continues in the judging studio, where the panel, particularly Nadège, praises Anastasia for her consistency on the catwalk, Karis for displaying newfound confidence and an aggressive walk, and Sabrina and Carlotta for their overall strong performances.

Anisia is advised to put in more effort, while Elisa is reprimanded for her unrefined walk and pose, as well as for looking down on the catwalk. Veronica is criticized for appearing dull on the runway, Diletta is scolded for being off-theme by delivering a high-fashion walk instead of an aggressive one, and Eleonora is chastised for being too slow and generally bland, making herself forgettable—though her look was well received by John Richmond.

However, the most unexpected moment occurs during Jade’s evaluation, when the Italian-Australian contestant reveals that she has realized modeling is not the path she wants to pursue. Feeling homesick, she decides to leave the competition, much to Michael’s astonishment. The models’ coach, however, is pleased to see that Jade has made up her mind about her future.

After deliberation, Eleonora and Veronica are placed in the bottom two due to their unimpressive and unmemorable performances. Following a runway challenge, the judges cast their votes. With three out of five votes from Natasha, Giusi, and the guest judge, Veronica is eliminated, leading to a bittersweet moment as she is separated from her twin sister, Gilda.

- Quit: Jade Albany Pietrantonio
- Bottom two: Eleonora Meneghini and Veronica Testa
- Eliminated: Veronica Testa
- Guest judge: Clarence Seedorf, football player and fashion amateur
- Special guest: John Richmond, fashion designer

=== Episode 4 ===
First aired 23 October 2009

This week, Giorgia confronts the rest of the group after feeling isolated by many of the girls, who accuse her of being two-faced. Some contestants also openly express that she comes across as too bossy when it comes to housework.

A message from Natasha informs the girls that they will be taken to the Milanese countryside for a lingerie photoshoot. The eleven aspiring models are driven to a farm, where they discover they will be posing in glamorous lingerie alongside pigs and cows in the farm stables. Caroline is visibly disgusted by the pigs, while Sabrina and Anastasia feel at ease in the setting. Anisia requires some coaching to perfect her pose, and Eleonora struggles throughout the shoot.

In the studio, the girls receive mixed reviews from the judges. All panel members agree that Anastasia delivered a perfect shot, while Anisia is advised to be more present and exude confidence in person. Caroline receives praise, whereas Giorgia is reprimanded for her body positioning and facial expression.

Sabrina is liked by Natasha but criticized by Nadège, who also remarks that Carlotta's facial features are too harsh to control in photographs. Eleonora is criticized for her stiff arms and lackluster facial expression. Elisa is praised for her energy, though her pose is considered too extreme, while Diletta is commended for effectively using her curvy figure.

After deliberation, during which Anisia, Carlotta, Eleonora, and Giorgia are deemed to have the weakest photos, Carlotta and Eleonora are placed in the bottom two. Following a runway challenge, judges Giusi, Michael, and Nadège vote against Eleonora for failing to deliver a confident walk, resulting in her elimination from the competition.

After Eleonora's elimination, a new contestant, Marianna, is introduced to the group as Jade's replacement.

- Bottom two: Carlotta Castagneris and Eleonora Meneghini
- Eliminated: Eleonora Meneghini
- Guest judge: Alena Seredova, glamour model
- Featured photographer: Settimio Benedusi

=== Episode 5 ===
First aired 30 October 2009

During the week, Caroline and Diletta attempt a brief escape from the models' house. As a result of breaking the rules, they are punished by Michael and barred from participating in the weekly reward challenge, where the other contestants have the opportunity to reunite with their loved ones who have traveled to Milan to meet them.

This week's challenge sees the girls participating in a photoshoot where the 11 contestants must pose as actresses styled in a 1950s look for a horror movie poster, demonstrating their ability to express fear on set. Caroline shows little interest in screaming when the photographer asks her to do so, and requires coaching from Michael. Giorgia appears somewhat stiff, while Sabrina manages to make both the photographer and the art director laugh due to her exaggerated performance.

In the studio, the girls' evaluations vary significantly from judge to judge. Sabrina is liked by Giusi for her humorous look, while the rest of the panel criticizes her for being overdone. Elisa is deemed too static and lacking in creativity, while Carlotta is once again reprimanded by Nadège for her facial limitations. Anastasia is told she could have done better, and Gilda and Karis receive mixed reviews. Diletta and Anisia are praised for their facial expressions, but it is Marianna who impresses the judges with her shot. Caroline is scolded for her attitude on set, while Giorgia is liked by Natasha but comes across as unnatural to Michael.

Caroline is placed in the bottom two for her unprofessional behavior, and she is joined by Carlotta, whose limited range of expressions leads to her elimination this week. Carlotta is voted out by Nadège, guest judge Edwige, and Giusi.

- Bottom two: Carlotta Castagneris and Caroline Cecere
- Eliminated: Carlotta Castagneris
- Guest judge: Edwige Fenech, actress and film producer
- Featured photographer: Nicola Majocchi

=== Episode 6 ===
First aired 6 November 2009

This week's reward challenge involved the remaining girls acting in a scene with a professional actor, portraying the role of a suspicious girlfriend. Anisia and Karis both delivered convincing performances, but it was Karis who portrayed the role most effectively, earning a free afternoon of shopping in Milan with the Italian actor she performed with.

For their weekly challenge, the girls are taken to a car dump, where Michael explains that they will be walking on a haulaway while wearing eco-chic, flowy dresses designed by Leila Hafzi. The models will also display floral ornaments on their heads. The task proves to be intimidating for some girls, particularly Elisa, who expresses her tension before her performance. After the challenge, Marianna has a meltdown, feeling as though she may have lost control of her body and fearing she will be eliminated for this mistake, a failure she believes she will not be able to forgive herself for.

In the studio, the panel praises Gilda for her improvements, Anastasia for her consistency, and Giorgia for her perfect runway walk. Nadège warns Karis that her walk is overdone and not impressive, while Anisia is scolded for failing to maintain eye contact with the camera at the end of the runway. Elisa disappoints the judges, with Natasha and Giusi pointing out that she is not progressing, and Michael claiming she is not learning. Diletta is reprimanded for her heavy walk, and Marianna is criticized for lacking overall control of her movements.

After deliberation, during which Anisia, Diletta, Elisa, and Marianna are deemed the worst of the week, the judges decide to place Diletta and Elisa in the bottom two. Following a runway challenge in which the two girls walk in bikinis and metallic dresses, Natasha, Michael, and Nadège choose to end Elisa's journey in the competition.

- Bottom two: Diletta Neri and Elisa Provaso
- Eliminated: Elisa Provaso
- Guest judge: Irene Pivetti, former politician and TV presenter
- Special guest: Luca Calvani, actor

=== Episode 7 ===
First aired 13 November 2009

During the week, Anisia plays a practical joke on Giorgia by drawing moustaches on her wallpaper, as she was named the best girl of the week. The joke is not well received, as the two girls have never gotten along, leading to an argument. Giorgia accuses Anisia of being immature and jealous, viewing the joke as a childish prank. Anastasia defends Giorgia, telling Anisia that she is being rude and lacks the qualities necessary to model.

For this week's photoshoot, the nine remaining girls must pose as sensual and ironic pin-up models promoting typical foods from Italian cuisine, such as tomatoes, pasta, mozzarella, cheeses, peppers, and chilies. Sabrina surprises everyone on set by playfully interacting with the food and the chef the models are posing with, while Karis struggles to portray sensuality with her body and bursts into tears of discouragement. Diletta impresses the photographer with her playful poses. Caroline refuses to take risks with her body, fearing her shot will appear vulgar, and states that she has already done enough on set. Most of the girls enjoy the fun and lighthearted photoshoot.

In the studio, Sabrina receives praise from the panel for her presence in the shot, as does Diletta for her performance. Anastasia and Marianna are also liked by the judges, while Anisia and Gilda receive mixed reviews. Giorgia is criticized for being too technical in her poses, resulting in a flat and boring picture. Karis is reprimanded for losing confidence and executing poses poorly. Caroline is scolded for her attitude, lack of professionalism, and limited variety, although her beauty is appreciated.

Giorgia and Karis eventually land in the bottom two. Following a runway challenge, Giorgia's self-confidence convinces Michael, Nadège, and the guest judge to vote for Karis as this week's eliminated contestant.

- Bottom two: Giorgia Albarello and Karis Decò
- Eliminated: Karis Decò
- Guest judge: Luca Tommasini, choreographer and art director
- Featured photographer: Nancy Fina
- Special guest: Simone Rugiati, chef

=== Episode 8 ===
First aired 20 November 2009

The eight remaining contestants spend the week practicing their runway walks with two male models who are staying with them in the models' house. In this week's runway challenge, the girls will walk in an elegant runway show paired with the male models.

The girls are taken to Palazzo Clerici, a historic building in Milan, where they will walk wearing Ermanno Scervino dresses in the mirrors' room, adorned with frescoes by Tiepolo. In this refined setting, Michael instructs them to showcase an elegant and sophisticated walk, as well as a passionate interaction in the final pose at the end of the runway with their paired male model.

In the studio, the panel provides contrasting feedback to the aspiring models, with Nadège being particularly dissatisfied with most of the girls' performances. Michael advises Anastasia to be less self-centered, while other judges praise her for being extremely refined and engaged in her interaction with her male partner. Anisia is noted for improving her walk and showing more confidence, although Nadège still identifies flaws in her performance. Diletta is reprimanded for her heavy walk and inelegant gestures, while Giorgia disappoints the panel for being lifeless and lacking passion in her performance. Sabrina is criticized by Nadège, who describes her as classless in her approach. Natasha scolds Marianna for appearing too actress-like in her interaction with her male partner, losing a model's attitude. Giusi praises Caroline for her elegance and talent, while Nadège acknowledges Caroline's discomfort with the dress, noting her stiff final pose. Gilda is praised for walking elegantly and appreciated for her interaction and final glance towards the camera.

Following a debated deliberation, where Nadège accuses Michael of defending the girls too much, the panel decides that Diletta and Giorgia deserve to be placed in the bottom two. After a runway challenge, Diletta is chosen by Giusi, Michael, and Nadège to leave the competition for lacking a model's presence, while Giorgia is spared for her convincing performance.

- Bottom two: Diletta Neri and Giorgia Albarello
- Eliminated: Diletta Neri
- Guest judge: Pietro Taricone, actor
- Featured male models: Emanuele and Mitia

=== Episode 9 ===
First aired 27 November 2009

The seven remaining contestants undergo their second makeovers at the Charme&Cheveux salon in Milan. Anastasia receives a radical change, with her hair partially shaved and dyed red, while the other girls receive minor changes. All the girls appear pleased with their new looks.

For this week's photoshoot, the girls are taken to a spa, where they will pose underwater wearing Morellato jewels. Anastasia struggles with the task, while Sabrina overcomes her fear of water and succeeds in the shoot.

In the studio, the girls are evaluated on their performances. Anisia is universally praised for her improvement and beautiful shot, while Caroline disappoints the entire panel with a terrible photo. Anastasia is said to have delivered her worst performance to date, though the panel praises her competitive spirit and self-confidence. Sabrina receives positive feedback, although Nadège still wants her to show more elegance. Gilda is criticized for her unelegant arm placement and cold facial expression.

During deliberation, Anastasia, Caroline, and Gilda are noted for having the worst photos. Ultimately, it is Caroline and Gilda who face each other in the bottom two. After a runway challenge, the panel saves Caroline for showing more confidence and potential. Giusi, Michael, and the guest judge vote to eliminate Gilda from the competition, as they feel she is unable to improve further.

- Bottom two: Caroline Cecere and Gilda Testa
- Eliminated: Gilda Testa
- Guest judge: Gianluca Vialli, former football player
- Featured photographer: Nicola Majocchi

=== Episode 10 ===
First aired 4 December 2009

With six girls remaining, the house is divided into two groups: Anastasia, Giorgia, and Sabrina on one side, and Anisia, Caroline, and Marianna on the other. Anastasia and Anisia develop an ever-increasing rivalry as the days go by.

For the week's photoshoot, the aspiring models are photographed wearing elegant gowns by Addy van den Krommenacker and posed alongside a live tiger named Lucy. Sabrina and Caroline are commended for not showing fear on set and being quite comfortable with the animal, while Anisia expresses fear.

In the studio, the girls are evaluated by the panel. Anastasia is praised for her elegant body positioning. Sabrina manages to redeem herself in Nadège's eyes by producing a sophisticated pose and facial expression, earning appreciation from the judges. However, Marianna and Giorgia are not positively judged for being too technical in their poses. Giusi points out that Giorgia's facial expression appears vulgar in her shot, and the panel agrees that Marianna's facial expression is not well-defined. Michael criticizes both girls for posing in a forced manner. Caroline is noted for her beauty, which remains her strongest asset, but Nadège expresses dissatisfaction with her lack of effort in posing, stating that Caroline relies on her looks and fails to give more, which is required in a fashion photo. Anisia disappoints Natasha and Michael with her heavy shoulder positioning and lack of presence in her shot, despite having a strong facial expression.

During deliberation, Anisia, Caroline, Giorgia, and Marianna are critiqued for their flaws. Natasha informs the girls that two of them will be eliminated. Anisia, Giorgia, and Marianna land in the bottom three. Unfortunately, Giorgia is chosen to leave the competition for producing the worst shot. After bursting into tears, she is comforted by the host and leaves the studio. Following a runway challenge, Anisia, despite having a less impressive walk, is picked to remain in the competition for being more convincing in her photos. Marianna’s journey comes to an end with the votes of Giusi, Michael, and Nadège.

After Marianna's elimination, the four remaining girls are informed by Natasha that they will sail on a cruise in the Mediterranean to visit Marseille and Barcelona.

- Bottom three: Anisia Tripa, Giorgia Albarello, and Marianna Di Martino
- First eliminated: Giorgia Albarello
- Second eliminated: Marianna Di Martino
- Guest judge: Vladimir Luxuria, show-woman
- Featured photographer: Settimio Benedusi

=== Episode 11 ===
First aired 11 December 2009

The girls leave Milan and travel to Genoa, where they board a cruise ship in the Mediterranean Sea. The four remaining contestants visit Marseille and Barcelona, but the ship serves as the location for their weekly photoshoot. Anastasia, Anisia, Caroline, and Sabrina must pose as 1980s-styled Bond girls in the ship's casino alongside the models' coach, Michael Giannini. All the girls perform well on set and receive praise from the photographer for delivering excellent shots.

In the studio, the panel commends the girls for their efforts. Anisia redeems herself with her picture, delivering a striking glance and an impressive pose. Anastasia wows Michael with her interaction on set and is praised for the natural elegance she consistently brings to her performances, though Giusi expected more intensity in her eyes. Sabrina is recognized for producing a very good shot, thanks to her gaze and presence. Nadège commends her for improving and becoming more refined, though she points out that Sabrina should have been more elegant in her pose. Caroline is noted for her natural beauty and sensuality. She is praised for posing with a new facial expression, but the judges question whether it fits the theme appropriately.

After reviewing all the pictures, the judges decide to place Caroline and Sabrina in the bottom two. They walk in a runway challenge, and soon after, Nadège, Michael, and guest judge designer Elio Fiorucci vote to eliminate Caroline from the competition. As a result, Anastasia, Anisia, and Sabrina are left as the three finalists of the season.

- Bottom two: Caroline Cecere and Sabrina Cereseto
- Eliminated: Caroline Cecere
- Guest judge: Elio Fiorucci, fashion designer
- Featured photographer: Settimio Benedusi

=== Episode 12 ===
First aired 18 December 2009

The three finalists, Anastasia, Anisia, and Sabrina, face their ultimate photoshoot: an editorial for A Magazine. The girls are determined to deliver their best performances and impress the panel. On set, they wear elegant long dresses, using them to create dynamic movements in a minimalistic atmosphere.

In the studio, the girls are praised for making it this far and completing their journey by improving with each challenge. Anastasia is commended for her pose and her dreamy, softer expression. Anisia is praised for showcasing her new, stronger self, while Sabrina is recognized for her overall elegant and sophisticated outcome, which helped her overcome her previous reliance on explicit sensuality.

In the end, the judges decide that Anastasia is the first contestant to advance to the final challenge, the ultimate runway show. Anisia and Sabrina are placed in the bottom two, with Anisia chosen as the second finalist. Sabrina is eliminated and leaves the studio after thanking the judges for their guidance, a gesture that moves the panel, who had to make a difficult decision.

- Bottom two: Anisia Tripa and Sabrina Cereseto
- Eliminated: Sabrina Cereseto

In the final runway show, Anastasia and Anisia walk in Dsquared outfits in front of the panel and the designers of the brand, Dean and Dan Caten. Each girl wears three outfits, showcasing them with a strong and impressive catwalk.

After the runway show, the judges make their final decision. In the end, Anastasia is proclaimed the winner due to her consistent performances, fashion body, drive, and sheer determination, as well as her skilled walk, making her the most complete model of the season.

- Final two: Anastasia Silveri and Anisia Tripa
- Runner-up: Anisia Tripa
- Italia's Next Top Model: Anastasia Silveri
- Guest judges: Dean and Dan Caten, fashion designers
- Featured photographer: Nicola Majocchi

== Contestants ==
(ages stated are at start of contest)

Contestant	Age	Height	Hometown	Outcome	Place
Athina Covassi	19	1.75 m (5 ft 9 in)	Udine	Episode 2	15
Jade Albany Pietrantonio	19	1.72 m (5 ft 7 1/2 in)	Turin	Episode 3	14 (quit)
Veronica Testa	18	1.82 m (5 ft 11 1/2 in)	Turin	Episode 3	13
Eleonora Meneghini	24	1.76 m (5 ft 9 1/2 in)	Verona	Episode 4	12
Carlotta Castagneris	20	1.80 m (5 ft 11 in)	Turin	Episode 5	11
Elisa Provaso	22	1.73 m (5 ft 8 in)	Verbania	Episode 6	10
Karis Decò	20	1.78 m (5 ft 10 in)	Livorno	Episode 7	9
Diletta Neri	18	1.80 m (5 ft 11 in)	Caserta	Episode 8	8
Gilda Testa	18	1.82 m (5 ft 11 1/2 in)	Turin	Episode 9	7
Giorgia Albarello	20	1.82 m (5 ft 11 1/2 in)	Padua	Episode 10	6
Marianna Di Martino De Cecco	20	1.78 m (5 ft 10 in)	Catania	Episode 10	5
Caroline Cecere	21	1.78 m (5 ft 10 in)	Naples	Episode 11	4
Sabrina Cereseto	21	1.74 m (5 ft 8 1/2 in)	Milan	Episode 12	3
Anisia Tripa Calugaru	19	1.78 m (5 ft 10 in)	Grosseto	Episode 12	2
Anastasia Silveri	24	1.78 m (5 ft 10 in)	Chieti	Episode 12	1

== Summaries ==
=== Call-out order ===
Natasha's call-out order
Order	Episodes												
Order	1	2	3	4	5	6	7	8	9	10	11	12	13
1	Isalyn	Erin	Melinda	Erin	Chantal	Melinda	Victoria	Isalyn	Chantal	Victoria	Erin	Melinda	Isalyn
2	Melinda	Petra	Isalyn	Isalyn	Victoria	Kelsey	Angela	Chantal	Wia	Melinda	Chantal	Chantal	Chantal Melinda
3	Angela	Wia	Victoria	Petra	Petra	Heather	Isalyn	Erin	Isalyn	Isalyn	Melinda	Isalyn	Chantal Melinda
4	Chantal	Melinda	Chantal	Victoria	Isalyn	Wia	Chantal	Victoria	Angela	Chantal	Isalyn	Erin	
5	Erin	Isalyn	Wia	Angela	Heather	Victoria	Petra	Angela	Erin	Erin	Victoria		
6	Petra	Chantal	Kelsey	Melinda	Kelsey	Erin	Melinda	Kelsey	Victoria	Angela			
7	Victoria	Abigail	Angela	Chantal	Melinda	Chantal	Wia	Melinda	Melinda	Wia			
8	Wia	Angela	Erin	Wia	Erin	Angela	Kelsey	Wia	Kelsey				
9	Kelsey	Lindsay	Abigail	Heather	Angela	Petra	Erin	Petra					
10	Abigail	Kelsey	Eulalia	Abigail	Abigail	Isalyn	Heather						
11	Lindsay	Eulalia	Petra	Kelsey	Wia	Abigail							
12	Darsi	Victoria	Lindsay	Eulalia	Eulalia								
13	Eulalia	Darsi											
14	Stella												

The contestant was eliminated
The contestant quit the competition
The contestant won the competition

- In episode 1, the pool of 16 girls was reduced to 14 who moved on to the main competition.
- In episode 3, Jade quit the competition. She was replaced by Marianna the following episode after Eleonora's elimination took place.
- The call-outs do not reflect the girls' actual performances in the first five episodes.

Bottom Two/Three

Episodes	Contestants			Eliminated
2	Athina	&	Carlotta	Athina
3	Eleonora	&	Veronica	Jade
3	Eleonora	&	Veronica	Veronica
4	Carlotta	&	Eleonora	Eleonora
5	Carlotta	&	Caroline	Carlotta
6	Diletta	&	Elisa	Elisa
7	Giorgia	&	Karis	Karis
8	Diletta	&	Giorgia	Diletta
9	Caroline	&	Gilda	Gilda
10	Anisia	Giorgia	Marianna	Giorgia
10	Anisia	Giorgia	Marianna	Marianna
11	Caroline	&	Sabrina	Caroline
12	Anisia	&	Sabrina	Sabrina
12	Anastasia	&	Anisia	Anisia

The contestant was eliminated after their first time in the bottom two
The contestant was eliminated after their second time in the bottom two
The contestant was eliminated after their second time in the bottom two
The contestant quit the competition
The contestant was eliminated and placed as the runner-up

=== Challenges guide ===
- Episode 1: Improvised runway show in Milan
- Episode 2: Sexy soldiers in a military-themed photoshoot
- Episode 3: Runway challenge for John Richmond
- Episode 4: Photoshoot with sexy lingerie in a farm stable
- Episode 5: Photoshoot inspired to a 1950s horror movie poster
- Episode 6: Runway challenge in a car dump with Leila Hafzi eco-chic dresses
- Episode 7: Photoshoot as pin-ups with Italian foods
- Episode 8: Runway challenge with Ermanno Scervino dresses
- Episode 9: Underwater photoshoot with Morellato Jewels
- Episode 10: Photoshoot with a tiger wearing Addy van den Krommenacker dresses
- Episode 11: Casino Royale inspired photoshoot
- Episode 12: Editorial photoshoot for A Magazine
- Episode 12: Final runway show for Dsquared2
