= Italia's Next Top Model season 2 =

Italia's Next Top Model
- Season 2
- No. of episodes: 13

Release
- Original network: SKY Vivo
- Original release: September 23 – December 16, 2008

Season chronology
- ← Previous; Season 1 Next → Season 3

This article contains episode summaries from Season 2 of the Italian competitive reality television series Italia's Next Top Model. This season premiered on SKY Vivo on 23 September 2008, and concluded on 16 December 2008.

Russian former model and actress Natasha Stefanenko returned as a main judge, accompanied by art director and talent scout Michael Giannini, former model Nadège du Bospertus and fashion journalist Giusi Ferré. Recurring judges were photographers Ciro Zizzo and Settimio Benedusi.

This season was won by Michela Maggioni, who received a one-year contract with d’Management Group as well as well as a Max Factor campaign worth €150,000.

== Episodes ==
=== Episode 1 ===
First aired September 23, 2008

After months of castings throughout Italy, the 30 pre-selected semi-finalists arrive in Milan. They are welcomed by Natasha Stefanenko, the host, and Michael Giannini, art director of d'Management, in a modern luxury hotel where the final castings will take place.

The models start their individual evaluations in front of the judging panel made up of Natasha, Michael, former top model Nadège, model scouts Danilo Di Pasquale and Anna Peggion. After judging, Natasha announces 20 contestants that have passed to the next stage of the competition, and 10 are eliminated.

The 20 remaining contestants then compete in a photoshoot challenge, designed to test their "facial intensity".

After the judges' deliberation, Natasha announces which 14 contestants will remain in the competition. The selected contestants are overjoyed, while some of the rejected contestants make rude remarks about the judges while leaving the hotel.

=== Episode 2 ===
First aired September 30, 2008

The 14 finalists are sent to the exclusive sea resort of Santa Margherita Ligure, where they are tested by competing in a photoshoot challenge with famous photographer Settimio Benedusi, who also worked for Sports Illustrated. The contestants must pose on rocks with aggressive but model-esque attitude in front of the Ligurian Sea while wearing bikinis. Some need to be coached, others perform naturally. The judges discuss and rank their performances.

At their first judging, Amy and Michela are highly praised for their effortless performance, and Beatrice is also praised. Noemi and Claudia B. are placed last for appearing uncomfortable at the photoshoot, and Claudia B. is sent home, for losing her determination in front of the camera and having a bad body posture.

- Bottom two: Claudia Boi & Noemi Del Falco
- Eliminated: Claudia Boi
- Guest judges: Settimio Benedusi, fashion photographer & Danilo Di Pasquale, model scout

=== Episode 3 ===
First aired October 7, 2008

In this episode, the models are told to get ready for their makeovers, so they reach the Charme & Cheveux salon to find out what they will be. Beatrice sheds a few tears when told her hair will be dyed red, but she is surprisingly satisfied with the outcome. Michela and Martina get more radical changes as their hair is cut shorter, but appreciate the result. Almost all of the models are happy with the changes with the exception of Claudia C. who does not allow the hairstylist to cut a fringe since for her that haircut is not easy to manage.

The next day, the contestants are taken to their first runway challenge, where they must walk wearing Love Moschino outfits, and portray a happy mood. Noemi redeems herself with an "effortless" performance, Giada demonstrates a huge improvement from her first walk, and Beatrice is praised by Rossella Jardini, the creative head of Moschino. Martina does not impress, and Claudia M. has troubles with her shoes being too small for her size.

In the judging room, Nadege is appalled and disappointed with most of the girls, Giorgia is criticised for walking with a sad mood, Claudia M. is criticised for appearing too fierce when walking, and she also states that Giulia's performance had horrified her. The judges ask Diletta for additional comments, and she harshly criticises Claudia C. for her poor performance and bad attitude during her makeover. Despite an entire week of training for runway walking, Mary is described as walking "like a soldier".

The judges place Claudia C. and Mary in the bottom two for their bad performances, and Mary is sent home as her look is considered too commercial and her walk is deemed the worst.

- Bottom two: Claudia Cuomo & Mary
- Eliminated: Mary
- Guest designer: Rossella Jardini, creative head of Moschino

=== Episode 4 ===
First aired October 14, 2008

The twelve remaining contestants experience some difficulties living together; Martina argues with Michela over cereals, while Diletta is annoyed by Michela's lack of interest in other people's needs. A group made up of Giorgia, Elena, Diletta, Noemi and Martina does not seem to get along well with Michela's personality. Natasha is deeply disappointed with this childish attitude and reminds the models they are there to compete, and should behave like adults.

The contestants take part in their first reward challenge. Judge Giusi Ferré, a fashion journalist, gives them a brief lesson on the history of fashion in the 20th century and asks the girls to recreate a vintage look using vintage dresses and clothes from Franco Jacassi's collection. Amy is declared the winner for her elegant look and is awarded with an Emilio Pucci vintage dress.

The girls are then informed of their third elimination challenge. They will pose in two groups for a photoshoot for a printed advertisement, where they will be wearing only a pair of Indian Rose jeans.

The judges then evaluate their photoshoots. Nadege is still not convinced by many girls' performances, and states that Beatrice is not a suitable model for jeans. Amy is praised for never appearing to be boring, Noemi is criticised for appearing uncomfortable on camera and Diletta, although showing improvement in her facial expressions, is called a "broken doll" due to her posing, and reprimanded for not listening to the photographer. Giulia is complimented for her eyes' intensity and for working with her body. Elena is found too plain and Martina's face is noticed for her look, despite Nadege's disapproval.

Diletta and Noemi find themselves in the bottom two and Noemi is eliminated for her performance in the photoshoots that placed her at the bottom twice in three weeks.

- Bottom two: Diletta & Noemi Del Falco
- Eliminated: Noemi Del Falco
- Special Guest: Franco Jacassi, fashion collection owner

=== Episode 5 ===
First aired October 21, 2008

After being told to get ready for this week's reward challenge, the eleven remaining models meet Rajan Tolomei, make-up artist of Max Factor. He teaches the girls a basic lesson on how to create a natural and fresh makeup look, useful for castings. Then the contestants are asked to recreate the makeup of a Japanese geisha. Giorgia, Giulia and Elena do extremely well but is Giorgia who wins the challenge and she shares the prize with Elena. The reward is a phone call to a loved person.

The models are then evaluated on a runway challenge where they must walk wearing the elegant lingerie designed by Madame Chantal Thomass. The designer herself prepares and coaches the models for the runway where they will interpret the sexy and sophisticated lingerie without being vulgar. At the end, Chantal Thomass is quite satisfied with some of the contestants' walks and interpretations.

In the judging session, Claudia M., Elena and Giada are praised because of their improvements on the runway, Giulia is highly praised for being self-confident despite her curvy thighs. Diletta is considered bored and scared while walking, but Michael and Nadege defend her for delivering a good walk wearing open shoes with pantyhose that can get slippery. Michela is reprimanded for showing lack of confidence by making grimaces at the end of the runway, Amy is scolded for losing composure and producing an unacceptable performance and so is Claudia C. for her lack of expression.

Claudia C. and Amy are placed in the bottom two because of their second lacklustre performance on the runway, and Claudia C. is sent home for always having only an aggressive mood on the runway regardless of the brief.

- Bottom two: Claudia Cuomo & Amy
- Eliminated: Claudia Cuomo
- Guest designer: Madame Chantal Thomass, lingerie designer
- Guest judge: Rajan Tolomei, make-up artist of Max Factor

=== Episode 6 ===
First aired October 28, 2008

The ten models get a visit from Stefano Fadda, a "coolhunter". He explains that, for this week's reward challenge, they must do some "coolhunting "in the centre of Milan, taking pictures of people who may anticipate certain fashion trends. Martina is exempt from the challenge, having injured her foot by slipping on the staircase when walking with wet feet. The nine models are split into groups of three, and sent downtown to take snapshots. Diletta, Elena and Giorgia are declared the winners, and spend an evening out in one of Milan's coolest lounge bars.

For the week's elimination challenge, the contestants participate in a beauty photoshoot with Ciro Zizzo, and they must pose without makeup to show their true potential. Beatrice, Martina and Michela shine according to the photographer, while Diletta, Elena, Giorgia and Giulia struggle and need to be coached.

In the judging room the contestants' photos are shown with and without digital retouching to determine who has a fresh face and who has not. Claudia M. cries when critiqued, Giulia disappoints the panel because of an uninteresting shot, and Elena is deemed too unremarkable by the photographer. Martina and Amy are praised for their photos and Giorgia surprises the judges with the best shot despite her nervousness in front of the camera.

Diletta and Giulia are paired in the bottom two for not translating their beauty into their pictures and for the amount of coaching they needed. Although declared one of the most beautiful girls, Diletta is eliminated for not progressing in the competition because of her weakness and for requiring too much retouching on her photo.

- Bottom two: Diletta & Giulia Galizia
- Eliminated: Diletta
- Special guest: Stefano Fadda, cool-hunter

=== Episode 7 ===
First aired November 4, 2008

The nine remaining models face their fourth reward challenge, when stylist Susanna Ausoni visits to teach the contestants how to accessorize a dress properly. The contestants are given a simple black dress, and are evaluated based on how they accessorise the item. After critiques are given, Claudia M. is declared winner of the challenge and is awarded with a shopping trip to a shoe store where she purchases a pair of Les Tropeziénnes shoes.

The contestants leave Milan for Genoa, where they take part in a complicated editorial photo shoot. The models arrive at the monumental cemetery of Staglieno and meet Nicola Majocchi, their photographer for this unusual photo shoot. The contestants must impersonate women in mourning while wearing high fashion dresses, with a monumental and macabre grave in the background. Elena, Giorgia and Michela show great interpretive skills, but for Amy, Beatrice, and Claudia M., the task seems to be much harder.

Back in Milan, the judges scold Amy for the sleepy look on her photo and Martina receives warnings to be more present when doing the photoshoots. Judge Nadege is deeply disappointed with Giulia's weight gain and strongly reprimands her for not taking care of her body. Elena, Giada, Giorgia and Michela shine in their photos according to the panel, while Claudia M's performance is criticised.

Martina and Claudia M. are ranked in the bottom two for their disappointing performances both on set and on picture. After Martina is warned to overcome her limits quickly to be noticed by the panel, Claudia M. is sent home for not impressing the judges enough with her poor results on set, and for her lack of expression in the last photoshoots.

- Bottom two: Martina & Claudia Manzella
- Eliminated: Claudia Manzella
- Guest judge: Nicola Majocchi, fashion photographer
- Special guest: Susanna Ausoni, stylist and look maker

=== Episode 8 ===
First aired November 11, 2008

For this week's reward challenge, the eight remaining model participate in a photoshoot where they must pose in motion while playing tennis. After the contestants get coached in the basic movements, their photographer Ciro Zizzo asks them to express elegance and flexibility even under physical effort. The winner of the challenge is Michela, who received a visit from her mother.

For their weekly elimination challenge, the models are taken to the beautiful neoclassical scenery of Villa Olmo in Como, where they will take part in their first public runway show that evening. They must walk on a runway submerged by ten centimetres of water. The task consists of walking and showing off the gowns by being natural, despite the difficulty of walking on water. All the girls are scared for this challenge, but some of them manage to deliver good walks.

In the judging room, Giorgia is praised for being more natural compared to her first weeks, Martina is noticed for her improvements, and Beatrice gets unanimous praise for her good performance. Michael is extremely disappointed in Elena's failure on this runway, and Natasha reprimands her by stating that excuses will not get her anywhere. Nadege scolds Giulia for her heavy walk, and for not having the spirit of sacrifice required in a model since she has gained weight the previous weeks, but Michael defends her performance. Nadège tells Michela that her performance was overdone. Giada is told to show more confidence, as her walk did not impress the panel as the previous ones.

In the end Elena and Giulia are ranked in the bottom two, and Giulia gets eliminated for her weight gain that hampered her performance, and for lacking the determination she declared herself to have.

- Bottom two: Elena Ripamonti & Giulia Galizia
- Eliminated: Giulia Galizia
- Guest judge: Costantino Della Gherardesca, fashion expert
- Special guest: Stefano Lacarbonara, tennis instructor

=== Episode 9 ===
First aired November 18, 2008

The seven remaining contestants receive a second makeover to refresh their looks and, despite some initial complaints, all are satisfied with the final outcomes.

The girls are told that for their weekly reward challenge they will be treated like stars. They are taken to a television studio centre where they meet Cristina Parodi, journalist and fashion expert, who explains that they will be prepared with elegant dresses and makeup to face a fake red carpet event, where they will be evaluated on their presence. The contestants must impersonate actresses at their movie premiere and, after posing for the photographers, they are briefly interviewed by Cristina. Elena is chosen as the winner for handling the questions with a natural attitude, and decides to share the reward with Giorgia. They spend time with Cristina in a luxury Japanese restaurant.

The models are then told to get ready for their elimination challenge. The models will act as sexy women in a TV commercial with the model and actor Sergio Muniz. They are excited to work with a man and must interpret different types of young women trying to seduce him as follows:

Contestant	Type of Woman
Amy	Lady Eating a Cherry
Beatrice	Androgynous Woman
Elena	Flamenco Dancer
Giada	Sexy Mechanic
Giorgia	Sexy Teacher
Martina	Baby Lolita
Michela	Fetish Mistress

The contestants are asked to pose with sensuality as tempting ladies behind an opening door, while the male model walks through a corridor to reach the only woman of his life, his mother, since the commercial celebrates Mother's Day. Some of the girls shine, others, such as Amy and Martina, are criticised for being too stiff.

In the judging room, all the judges are wowed by Giorgia's constant improvements, Giada impresses the panel with her seductive performance, although judge Giusi Ferré finds her a bit ordinary. Michela is praised for adapting to her role. Amy disappoints the judges with her "sleepy eyes and mechanical movements" and Martina is strongly criticised for not being sexy as required.

Amy and Martina are placed in the bottom two for their lacklustre performances on set, and Amy is eliminated for not being consistent in her improvements and for losing the determination Martina is considered to have.

- Bottom two: Amy & Martina
- Eliminated: Amy
- Guest judges: Sergio Muniz, model and actor & Danilo Di Pasquale, model scout
- Special guests: Cristina Parodi, journalist and fashion expert & Umberto Spinazzola, director

=== Episode 10 ===
First aired November 25, 2008

The six remaining models receive a visit from Barbara Ronchi Della Rocca, an etiquette expert, who teaches them how to behave appropriately when attending a formal social event. For this reward challenge, the models are taught the basis of table etiquette, and soon after they wear elegant dresses to attend a mock aristocratic dinner to show what they have learned. After some laughs are shared over some difficult situations, Martina is declared the winner for quickly learning and showing good manners. She decides to share the prize with Beatrice, and the two models are allowed to phone their families.

For the week's elimination challenge, the contestants are brought to Frankie Morello's atelier, where they meet Maurizio Modica and Pierfrancesco Gigliotti, founders and designers of this fashion house. The models then compete by showing their runway skills while wearing eccentric complex outfits. After being coached by the stylists about their dresses, they get prepared for the task. Many of the models are confident and satisfied after their performances.

In the judging room, the judges have contrasting opinions. Martina is praised for her confident walk, but is told to avoid her stiff facial expressions, Elena is complimented for delivering a good walk while wearing the most complicated outfit, although she still has to learn how to use her face. Michela is highly praised for her improvements, but Natasha scolds her for wasting the pose at the end of the runway, and Nadege says she was lucky to have a dress that fits her happy personality. Michael compliments Michela's impressive pose and glance before her exit. Giorgia is reprimanded for looking bored and forgettable when walking, and so is Giada for delivering a stiff performance with a bad pose. Beatrice's walk and mood are praised by Michael and the designers, but not appreciated by judges Nadège and Giusi, as they find it to be too unoriginal.

After deliberation, Giada and Giorgia are placed in the bottom two for their lack of improvement on the runway. Although the judges recognise Giada's potential, they decide to eliminate her for not overcoming her fears, and letting them hamper her walk and presence on the runway.

- Bottom two: Giada Folcia & Giorgia
- Eliminated: Giada Folcia
- Guest judges: Maurizio Modica & Pierfrancesco Gigliotti, founders and fashion designers of Frankie Morello
- Special guests: Barbara Ronchi Della Rocca, etiquette expert & Renzo Martini, actor

=== Episode 11 ===
First aired December 2, 2008

The five remaining contestants receive letters from their parents, and some tears are shed after two months without contact with their families. The next day, the contestants are told that for their weekly reward challenge, they will take part in a casting by Mariella Burani, noted Italian fashion designer. Casting director Francesca Mezzali evaluates the girls, saying that; Giorgia has too big hips, Elena must walk with more determination, and Beatrice has a good walk and the right look. Michela fails to impress because of her playful attitude, and gets reprimanded for not taking the casting seriously. Martina is deemed too shy by the way she walks and presents herself. Some of the models are ordered to be faster when getting dressed. Beatrice wins the challenge and can spend the entire afternoon out shopping, and also wins an expensive Mariella Burani purse.

The week's photoshoot takes place in Galleria Vittorio Emanuele II, located in the centre of Milan. There, the contestants are photographed by the renowned photographer Settimio Benedusi while suspended in the air, floating with peacock-inspired long dresses. After a demonstration from Natasha, they get coached about their movements. Each model is asked to express dynamism and lightness at the same time. Elena excels after overcoming her fear of heights, while Michela loses her focus.

At the judging panel, Beatrice is critiqued for her legs' and arms' stiffness and is reprimanded for not giving enough effort, despite producing an overall acceptable photo. Martina is praised by the photographer for taking directions well and expressing the requested emotion, although Nadège does not like the results. Giorgia is deemed too heavy in her shot for not being able to balance her body, thus looking lifeless to the judges. Elena is highly praised for working with her body and displaying a positive attitude on set, taking directions and giving various poses to the photographer like a professional model. Michela upsets Natasha, Michael and Nadege with her performance, and they heavily criticise her for being unprofessional on set, playing rather than focusing, and thus taking a step backwards in quality.

Michela and Giorgia are ranked in the bottom two and Michela is saved for effortless producing a good shot but is warned to grow up. Giorgia is eliminated for reaching her limit in the competition despite her previous improvements.

- Bottom two: Michela Maggioni & Giorgia
- Eliminated: Giorgia
- Guest judges: Settimio Benedusi, fashion photographer & Marta Citacov, fashion journalist
- Special guest: Francesca Mazzali, casting director of fashion designer Mariella Burani

=== Episode 12 ===
First aired December 9, 2008

The four remaining contestants leave Milan for Capri, one of Italy's most fashionable islands and a sea resort noted for inspiring such designers as Coco Chanel. After visiting the town and discovering the local fashion, the models compete in their last reward challenge. They must pose in pairs as mannequins in the windows of the local Valentino boutique, wearing the designer's dresses. For totally embodying the spirit of a living mannequin, Beatrice is declared the winner, and receives a pair of Sandali Capresi, the typical shoes of Capri.

Later, the contestants take part in the week's photo shoot, where they pose as sensual and sophisticated ladies on their yacht with Capri's reefs in the background. The task requires them to balance on wedge-heeled shoes while showing their '80s-inspired outfits. All the models manage to focus and deliver a good performance.

Back in Milan, in the judging room, Elena gets universal praises for her posing, facial expression and effort to make the most of her outfit. Beatrice is praised by Michael and Nadege for her photo and her modern icy beauty, while the photographer Settimio Benedusi points out her stiffness during the shooting. Michela is highly appreciated by Natasha and all the panel for her results and professionalism after her unprofessional behavior on the previous set. Martina is noticed for showing more femininity with her intense look and facial expression, although Nadege still finds her body to be too masculine.

After a difficult deliberation, Beatrice and Martina are placed in the bottom two and Beatrice is spared for her consistent results and high fashion look. Martina is eliminated because, although delivering her best performance, the judges think her determination can not make up for being still less impressive than the other finalists.

- Bottom two: Beatrice Coos & Martina
- Eliminated: Martina
- Guest judge: Settimio Benedusi, fashion photographer

=== Episode 13 ===
First aired December 16, 2008

The three finalists face their next to last challenge, posing for a Marie Claire-cover inspired photoshoot. All of them perform well, showing self-confidence and professionalism.

At judging, the girls get universal praises for their results and achievements in the competition. Antonella Antonelli, editor of Italian Marie Claire magazine, tells Michela that her shot could be an actual cover and appreciates her modern face. Elena is noticed for using her beauty to her advantage, thus producing a captivating shot. Beatrice is praised for her elegance, though her dress in the photo may distract from her face.

Following a difficult deliberation, the three contestants are all called in front of Natasha and commended for getting this far. Michela is called first and Elena is saved soon after. Beatrice, now eliminated, breaks into tears and is comforted by Natasha before leaving.

- Bottom two: Beatrice Coos & Elena Ripamonti
- Eliminated: Beatrice Coos
- Guest judges: Paolo Candian, fashion photographer & Rajan Tolomei, make-up artist of Max Factor

Then the two finalists are driven to Verona, at the main atelier of Byblos, an important Italian fashion house. There, Elena and Michela face their last challenge: a runway show with professional models where they are asked to show three different outfits each, walking with self-confidence, elegance and strength. Both models do their best and are happy to be in the final runway after overcoming the hostility that existed between them at the beginning of the competition.

In their last judging session, Natasha and Michael show their pride for the girls' achievements. Elena is commended for delivering a truly confident walk with a captivating and determined glance and the judges are amazed at her improvements that transformed her from a beautiful girl into a true model. Judge Rajan states that her beauty gives her a more commercial appeal, and she is praised for being able to change over the course of the competition. Michela is commended by Nadege for her effortless talent on set and her performance on the final runway, and, although Michael reminds her of a flaw in her second exit, she has convinced the judges of being capable to perform as a professional model.

After deliberation, the two remaining contestants are called back in the judging room and Natasha reveals that Michela is the new Italia's Next Top Model thanks to her natural posing talent and her improved model attitude and walk.

- Final two: Elena Ripamonti e Michela Maggioni
- Runner-up: Elena Ripamonti
- Italia's Next Top Model: Michela Maggioni
- Special guest: Manuel Facchini, designer and creative head of Byblos
- Guest judge: Rajan Tolomei, make-up artist of Max Factor

== Contestants ==
(ages stated are at start of contest)

Contestant	Age	Height	Hometown	Finish	Place
Claudia Boi	20	1.75 m (5 ft 9 in)	Esterzili, Sardinia	Episode 2	14
Mary Balducci	20	1.77 m (5 ft 9 1/2 in)	Sant'Angelo in Vado, Marche	Episode 3	13
Noemi Del Falco	20	1.80 m (5 ft 11 in)	Naples, Campania	Episode 4	12
Claudia Cuomo	24	1.76 m (5 ft 9 1/2 in)	Naples, Campania	Episode 5	11
Diletta Venturoli	24	1.76 m (5 ft 9 1/2 in)	Imola, Emilia Romagna	Episode 6	10
Claudia Manzella	18	1.74 m (5 ft 8 1/2 in)	Casteldaccia, Sicily	Episode 7	9
Giulia Galizia	19	1.78 m (5 ft 10 in)	Biancavilla, Sicily	Episode 8	8
Amy Doukoure	23	1.76 m (5 ft 9 1/2 in)	Turin, Piedmont	Episode 9	7
Giada Folcia	19	1.78 m (5 ft 10 in)	Monza, Lombardy	Episode 10	6
Giorgia De Nunno	19	1.74 m (5 ft 8 1/2 in)	Turin, Piedmont	Episode 11	5
Martina Cioffi	19	1.77 m (5 ft 9 1/2 in)	Genoa, Liguria	Episode 12	4
Beatrice Coos	18	1.82 m (5 ft 11 1/2 in)	Nimis, Friuli-Venezia Giulia	Episode 13	3
Elena Ripamonti	21	1.80 m (5 ft 11 in)	Villaverla, Veneto	Episode 13	2
Michela Maggioni	19	1.81 m (5 ft 11 1/2 in)	Gorgonzola, Lombardy	Episode 13	1

== Call-Out Order ==
Natasha's Call-out Order
Order	Episodes												
Order	2	3	4	5	6	7	8	9	10	11	12	13	14
1	Gertrude	Elsa Loylyn	Gertrude	Ice	Fiji	Loylyn	Loylyn	Fiji	Loylyn	Loylyn	Fiji	Fiji	Fiji
2	Perth	Elsa Loylyn	Ice	Fiji	Ice	Elsa	Fiji	Gertrude	Fiji	Nicole	Nicole	Loylyn	Loylyn Elsa
3	Loylyn	Fiji	Josefin	Soo	Loylyn	Lorenique	Ice	Elsa	Lorenique	Elsa	Loylyn	Elsa	Loylyn Elsa
4	Gixelle	Soo	Wiora	Gertrude	Perth	Fiji	Nicole	Loylyn	Ice	Fiji	Elsa	Nicole	
5	Clea	Abigail	Fiji	Loylyn	Elsa	Perth	Soo	Nicole	Nicole	Lorenique	Lorenique		
6	Josefin	Josefin	Loylyn	Abigail	Gertrude	Soo	Elsa	Lorenique	Elsa	Ice			
7	Nicole	Ice	Perth	Lorenique	Soo	Nicole	Lorenique	Ice	Gertrude				
8	Lorenique	Perth	Soo	Elsa	Abigail	Ice	Gertrude	Soo					
9	Fiji	Wiora	Lorenique	Perth	Lorenique	Gertrude	Perth						
10	Elsa	Gertrude	Nicole	Josefin	Nicole	Abigail							
11	Abigail	Clea	Elsa	Nicole	Josefin								
12	Wiora	Lorenique	Abigail	Wiora									
13	Ice	Nicole	Clea										
14	Soo	Gixelle											
15	Ingrida												

The contestant was eliminated
The contestant won the competition

- The first call-out does not reflect the girls' actual performances this first week.
- Episode 1 and 2 did not have reward challenges.

=== Bottom Two ===
Episodes	Contestants			Eliminated
2	Claudia B.	&	Noemi	Claudia B.
3	Claudia C.	&	Mary	Mary
4	Diletta	&	Noemi	Noemi
5	Amy	&	Claudia C.	Claudia C.
6	Diletta	&	Giulia	Diletta
7	Claudia M.	&	Martina	Claudia M.
8	Elena	&	Giulia	Giulia
9	Amy	&	Martina	Amy
10	Giada	&	Giorgia	Giada
10	Giorgia	&	Michela	Giorgia
11	Beatrice	&	Martina	Martina
12	Beatrice	&	Elena	Beatrice
12	Elena	&	Michela	Elena

The contestant was eliminated after their first time in the bottom two
The contestant was eliminated after their second time in the bottom two
The contestant was eliminated after their second time in the bottom two
The contestant was eliminated and placed as the runner-up
