= Italia's Next Top Model season 4 =

Italia's Next Top Model
- Season 4
- No. of episodes: 12

Release
- Original network: Sky TV SkyUno
- Original release: March 30 – June 15, 2011

Season chronology
- ← Previous; Season 3

The fourth season of the Italian reality television show Italia's Next Top Model premiered on SKY Vivo on 30 March 2011 and concluded on 15 June 2011.

The series was once again hosted by Russian former model and actress Natasha Stefanenko. The other permanent judges were Michael Giannini, an art director and talent scout at the modeling agency d’Management; former model Antonia Dell'Atte; fashion photographer Alberto Badalamenti; and fashion journalist Giusi Ferré.

For the first time, a transgender contestant, Adriana Mazzarini, was part of the final cast. The season was won by Alice Taticchi, who received a contract with Fashion Model Milan and an editorial feature for Lancôme.

== Changes ==
After viewers criticized several format changes introduced in season 3, the show returned to its original structure, without an audience and with no more runway challenges at the panel. The daily episodes were removed, and weekly episodes were edited to cover one week of events.

The prizes for this season changed: Fashion Model Management replaced d'Management Group as the winner's agency—although Michael Giannini, the art director of d'Management, remained as contestants' coach and judge—and the Max Factor campaign was replaced by an editorial spread for Lancôme.

== Episode summaries ==
=== Episode 1 ===
First aired 7 January 2011

For this season, the cast was chosen in a live final casting episode, in which 24 hopefuls selected from castings throughout the country presented themselves before the judges and a live audience. After the pool was reduced to 16, the contestants, divided into groups of four, showcased their walks in themed runway segments and spoke about their lives and modeling ambitions. The finalists were then chosen by viewer vote, with only three out of each group of four advancing. From the four eliminated contestants, the judges selected one to join the 12 chosen by the public. The 13 finalists were also joined by the winner of the web casting, selected by online voters to become an official finalist.

Group 1	Group 2	Group 3	Group 4	Wildcard
Rossella G	Lorenza	Giulia	Francesca	Alice
Ilaria	Elizabeth	Ginevra	Beatrice	Rossella B
Bruna	Veronica	Benedetta	Adriana	Laura
Laura	Alice	Valentina	Rossella B	Valentina

After the episode, Elizabeth withdrew from the competition for personal reasons and was replaced by semi-finalist Rossella B., who had previously missed being reintroduced to the final cast by just one vote in the judges' decision to bring back one of the four eliminated contestants.

=== Episode 2 ===
First aired 30 March 2011

Natasha meets the 14 contestants in the city center of Milan and accompanies them in a limousine to their new home. She tells them they will be staying in an entire palace, leading them to believe they’ll be living in luxurious accommodations. All the girls are excited as they arrive at their new house, but upon entering, they face an unpleasant truth. Although they are staying in a palace, it is completely devoid of the comforts they expected, with basic furniture, empty walls, small rooms, and only two bathrooms for all of them. Later, Michael explains that the setup is intended to show them the real life of a model’s house—small spaces, limited comforts, crowded bedrooms, and queues for the bathroom.

While most of the girls, despite their disappointment, get ready to clean up the rooms, Valeria displays a disgusted attitude toward their new home, refusing to do any housework and immediately claiming the more comfortable and only private bedroom for herself. Ginevra, on the other hand, is pleased with the accommodations, stating that all she needs is the chance to model. She criticizes Valeria for her fussy demeanor and her unwillingness to help with the chores.

The next day, the girls face their first reward challenge. Michael takes them to a nearby park, where they are dressed in rainy-day outfits and asked to walk with an umbrella on an improvised runway. In the end, Rossella B. is declared the winner of the challenge for displaying the most convincing walk. She is given two options: she can either take the private bedroom for herself or have workmen come to the house to make it cozier. Rossella B. chooses the second option, so two workmen arrive to add wall decorations, improve lighting, and build a runway for the girls to practice their walks. Meanwhile, each contestant receives a prize of new clothes.

The following day, the girls are informed that they will be doing their first photoshoot. On set, Natasha explains that they will need to embody characters or fashion styles that reflect their personalities. After brief individual discussions with each contestant to decide on their subject, they begin preparing for the shoot. During the session, they must take their own photos, using cameras with timers and quickly posing in front of them. Some girls, like Alice, Ginevra, and Rossella G., are comfortable, while others, such as Adriana, Bruna, and Lorenza, struggle to create a strong pose. The girls represent the following subjects:

Contestant	Subject
Adriana	Mermaid
Alice	Audrey Hepburn
Beatrice	Hippie
Benedetta	1930s Diva
Bruna	Naomi Campbell
Francesca	The Spring
Ginevra	The Future
Giulia	Sandy Olsson
Ilaria	Cleopatra
Lorenza	Snow White
Rossella B.	Alice in Wonderland
Rossella G.	Dr. Jekyll & Mr. Hyde
Valeria	Geisha
Veronica	1970s Rocker

At panel, the girls are evaluated based on a full-body shot and a close-up photo. Alice, Benedetta, Francesca, and Ginevra are praised for their shots, as is Rossella G., who produced a remarkable photo despite being described as somewhat common in person by Giusi. Beatrice is warned to think more while on set, and Ilaria is told she did not fully express her personality in her shot. Valeria receives mixed reviews, while Veronica is critiqued harshly for not embodying the mood she chose in her photo.

Bruna’s evaluation sparks a debate between Alberto, the photographer, and Michael, the girls’ mentor. Alberto accuses Michael of giving Bruna too many directions, which confused her, while Michael believes that new models need more guidance when starting photoshoots. Lorenza is criticized for being stiff on set, with her pose not matching the subject she chose, resulting in an overall poor shot. Adriana is scolded for her awkward pose and facial expression, producing a lackluster picture that fails to portray the femininity she has always aspired to.

In the end, Adriana and Lorenza are placed in the bottom two for their performances on set and poor shots. Lorenza is sent home, as she is deemed too uneasy in front of the camera.

- Bottom two: Adriana Mazzarini & Lorenza Celentano
- Eliminated: Lorenza Celentano

=== Episode 3 ===
First aired 6 April 2011

The girls are informed by Natasha that they will be getting makeovers. They are driven to Charme&Cheveux Salon, where Michael and the hairstylists will reveal their new looks. Rossella G. undergoes the most radical change, with her hair partly shaved and dyed platinum blond, while most of the other girls receive minor changes, such as trims and slight color adjustments.

Tensions arise when Francesca, already a natural blonde, points out that she finds it silly to have her hair dyed blonder. She questions her motivation to stay and starts an argument with Veronica, who criticizes Francesca for being whiny and disrespectful to the other girls who are accepting their makeovers, even if they don’t agree with the changes. Francesca refuses to speak to Veronica any longer, and Ginevra defends her by attacking Veronica for intervening. Later, Francesca goes through with her makeover, while Ginevra, upset with her new hairstyle, is comforted by Natasha.

Natasha pays a visit to the girls to have dinner with them. The dinner ends emotionally when the host gives Adriana a letter from her mother, who writes to encourage her daughter, acknowledging the difficult times she faced being raised by her grandparents and undergoing a gender reassignment operation.

The next day, Michael visits the girls' house to give them a catwalk lesson. Fashion model Silvia Dimitrova assists him in evaluating the girls. Alice, Francesca, and Ginevra receive positive reviews, while Beatrice is told she has improved her walk. Giulia is found to be uncomfortable on the runway, Valeria is too tense, and Benedetta’s walk is criticized for its flaws. Michael asks Ginevra to help the other girls practice, which leads Veronica to comment on Ginevra’s inability to correct the contestants’ flaws. Benedetta, meanwhile, expresses her disappointment in herself for feeling inferior to the other girls on the catwalk.

The following day, the girls receive a Natasha Mail informing them that they will be participating in their first runway challenge. They head to Istituto Marangoni, where they will be walking for the fashion school’s designers. Each designer is assigned a number of girls as follows:

Designer	Contestants	Collection Mood
Giulia Caserta	Rossella B., Veronica	Ethereal Elegance
Silvia Gaviraghi	Benedetta, Bruna	Aggressive/Romantic
Gian Marco Ianello	Francesca, Giulia, Ilaria	Melancholic Beauty
Anna Mignanego	Adriana, Beatrice, Valeria	Aggressive
Marco Pasquali	Alice, Ginevra, Rossella G.	Poised

At panel, Adriana, Beatrice, Francesca, Ginevra, and Ilaria are praised for their performances. Bruna is advised to give more expression and show more spunk to stand out. Valeria is reprimanded for her runway poses, and Giulia is criticized for looking lifeless and tense. Benedetta is reduced to tears after receiving negative reviews for not looking like a model and seeming out of place on the catwalk. She tries to convince the judges that she is there to learn. Alice is deemed bored and emotionless by Antonia. Rossella B. and Veronica receive mixed reviews, while Rossella G. is scolded for not being mentally present.

In the end, Natasha calls Adriana, Ginevra, and Ilaria as the three best performers, with Ginevra being at the top of the pack for her weekly performance on the catwalk. Benedetta and Giulia land in the bottom two for their unconvincing walks and poor presence on the runway. Ultimately, Giulia is eliminated.

- Bottom two: Benedetta Piscitelli & Giulia Danieli
- Eliminated: Giulia Danieli
- Featured guest: Silvia Dimitrova, fashion model
- Featured designers: Giulia Caserta, Silvia Gaviraghi, Gian Marco Iannello, Anna Mignanego, Marco Pasquali

=== Episode 4 ===
First aired 13 April 2011

The girls are sent to the gym for their physical assessment and weekly training. Valeria complains that she doesn't have a good relationship with physical activity and is not enthusiastic about doing her exercises.

Back at their house, the girls find a letter written by Michael, who inspected the rooms during their absence and found them dirty and untidy. As a result, Alice and Ilaria are assigned the task of supervising the general house cleaning. After the girls complete their domestic work, Michael announces that they will be taking part in their weekly reward challenge. Antonia also arrives, bringing her private collection of outfits created by famous designers. Michael explains that each girl will wear one of the outfits and pose while he takes Polaroid shots to evaluate which contestant shows the best posing skills.

After their performance, Michael and Antonia choose Alice as the winner of the challenge. She is given two options: she can either receive a washing machine to simplify their housework or have a five-minute phone call home, while each of the other girls will get a one-minute call. Alice chooses the latter, and tears are shed when the contestants get to speak to their loved ones. Some girls, like Adriana, Francesca, and Ginevra, refuse to call home to avoid getting emotional.

The next day, the girls receive a Natasha Mail telling them to get ready to leave. Later, they are led to believe they will be going to the airport, but instead, they are driven to the Milan Seadrome, where they meet Natasha and Olympic champion Antonio Rossi, who will be supervising and helping them through a triathlon session before their photoshoot, where the girls will pose to promote an energy drink.

To make their shots believable, the girls must tire themselves out through physical effort, so they compete in a running contest, a bicycle race, and a wall-climbing challenge. Valeria consistently falls behind and refuses to complete the wall-climbing task. Afterward, each girl poses in the photoshoot to advertise the energy drink.

During the judging session, Adriana, Alice, Benedetta, Rossella B., and Veronica are commended for producing believable pictures and effectively selling the product, despite it not being a real advertisement. Ginevra is scolded by Natasha for not respecting the commercial assignment, although other judges praise her posing ability.

Following last week's debate over Benedetta's appeal as an actress rather than a model, she is asked to perform some lines before the panel. After her actress impersonation, the judges decide to reward the girls with the washing machine they did not receive earlier. Benedetta is also praised for hiding her body flaws in her photo.

Rossella G. receives mixed reviews, with some judges not liking her pose, and Natasha warns her to work on her gaze. Francesca and Beatrice are reprimanded for their unconvincing shots, with Natasha scolding Beatrice for not being physically fit, which is evident in her picture.

Valeria is heavily reprimanded by Natasha for not being professional and for giving up during the training session, demonstrating a deplorable lack of commitment and respect toward the other girls, who did their duty in the challenge. Natasha also criticizes Valeria’s photo, stating it is as poor as her behavior, while Antonia critiques her pose.

In the end, Beatrice and Valeria are placed in the bottom two for their disappointing shots. Despite her potential, Beatrice is sent home.

- Bottom two: Beatrice Pancaldi & Valeria Colosio
- Eliminated: Beatrice Pancaldi
- Featured photographer: Luca Cattoretti
- Featured guest: Antonio Rossi, olympic athlete

=== Episode 5 ===
First aired 20 April 2011

For this week's reward challenge, the eleven remaining girls are brought to a store in the city center of Milan. They are divided into three groups and tasked with working as sales assistants to demonstrate their ability to sell clothes. Most of the girls struggle, but a few succeed in satisfying the clients. Bruna is declared the winner of the challenge, and as a prize, she gets ten minutes to pick all the clothes and accessories she likes from the store.

After the challenge, Ilaria and Benedetta complain about Bruna's frequent use of colored contact lenses. Ilaria argues that Bruna has an unfair advantage over the others when she uses colored contacts, as they make her stand out more in person and in photos, which upsets both girls. Additionally, Benedetta points out how Bruna always matches her outfits to her colored lenses.

The following day, Michael announces to the girls that they will be having an acting lesson. On stage, each girl must introduce herself to the rest of the group, and the acting coach evaluates their individual presentations. Afterward, the contestants are paired up and must tell each other what they like and dislike about one another. This leads to a confrontation between Ginevra and some of the girls, after which Adriana expresses her dislike towards Ginevra, accusing her of being conceited and fake. Ginevra disagrees, stating that this is how they probably see her because she has confidence in herself and her abilities.

The next day, the girls are brought to the Milan Science Museum, where they will face their second runway challenge. They will be walking for Italian fashion designer Antonio Marras. After a fitting, Antonio decides that Ginevra is the most qualified girl to open the runway show. During the runway performance, the designer comments to Natasha that Benedetta has a beautiful face, but she looks more like an actress than a model.

In the judging session, Alice, Francesca, and Ilaria are praised for their walks and presence on the runway. Ginevra is commended for her opening walk, but Natasha advises her to be more careful with her use of arms. The judges constantly disagree with Alberto's opinions, leading to mixed reviews for many of the girls. Valeria's walk is deemed too fast, while Alberto finds it suitable. Veronica's presence on the runway is questioned by Alberto, but she receives positive reviews from the other judges for delivering a perfect performance.

Bruna is recognized for her improvements, and Natasha invites Ilaria to express her unfavorable opinion on Bruna's use of colored contacts. Natasha then tells Bruna that she will no longer be allowed to wear them.

Adriana's facial expressions on the runway are not liked by Alberto but are appreciated by the other judges. Rossella B. receives compliments from Alberto, but Michael states he expected more from her walk. Benedetta receives the most negative review from Alberto, who points out that there is no model in her and that, in his opinion, she does not even want to become a model. Antonia strongly disagrees with this comment.

Rossella G. is scolded by Natasha for her incorrect movements at the end of the runway and for not fully committing to standing out on the catwalk.

Finally, Natasha declares Francesca the best runway performer of the week, with Ilaria as the runner-up. Benedetta faces her second bottom-two appearance, but it is Rossella G. who is eliminated in this episode.

- Bottom two: Benedetta Piscitelli & Rossella Gambi
- Eliminated: Rossella Gambi
- Featured designer: Antonio Marras
- Featured guest: Cecilia Vecchio, acting coach

=== Episode 6 ===
First aired 27 April 2011

The ten remaining girls have a posing lesson with photographer Alberto Badalamenti, who coaches them on how to produce a group shot without overshadowing one another. On set, Valeria is deemed too vulgar by the photographer, much to her surprise. Benedetta is eager to show Alberto she can pose like a model to prove his previous critiques wrong.

At the end of the lesson, Michael announces that the girls will use their posing skills in a collective reward challenge. They must create a believable group shot by cooperating with one another on set, each posing in a sporty T-shirt. Michael reminds the girls that no one will win the prize if even one girl fails the shoot.

In the end, both the photographer and the models' coach are satisfied with their work, and each girl receives a letter from her family. Tears are shed as the contestants read the encouraging words from their loved ones. Michael later adds that the girls must choose one of them to be awarded an extra prize: a visit from her mother. The girls opt to draw a name, and Ilaria is chosen. Ilaria's mother comes to the girls' house for a one-day visit, which pleases her daughter.

The following day, the girls are informed by Michael that they will be traveling to Mont Blanc for their photoshoot. After arriving, the contestants enjoy a night out with Michael. The next morning, they are brought up the mountain to prove themselves in this week's shoot. They pose on the snow, wearing just swimsuits and ecological fur at -5 °C and an altitude of 3,400 meters. Michael advises the girls to practice their poses backstage to avoid wasting time on set and getting cold.

Some girls are praised for their energetic performances, while others, like Veronica and Bruna, need coaching from Natasha and Michael to be more aggressive in their posing. Ginevra's overly studied poses are critiqued by the two judges on set.

Back in Milan, the girls face their evaluation at panel. Alice receives unanimous praise for her striking pose and face, although Antonia advises her to tone up her body. The same advice is given to Benedetta, who satisfies the judges with a pose that hides her body flaws.

Rossella B. is noticed for her captivating glance, and Francesca is commended for her elegant shot, icy glance, and ambitious posing. Ilaria is praised for producing a good shot, but Natasha points out that she always offers the same facial expression, while Michael encourages her to be more aware of her movements instead of being all over the place while posing.

Adriana's shot is considered vulgar by Alberto, though other judges praise it for hiding her flaws. Veronica is scolded for producing a bad photograph and lacking energy, while Bruna is critiqued for an overall disappointing result that makes the judges question whether she could be a model given her lack of improvement.

Valeria is criticized by Natasha for appearing unproportionate in her photo, while Ginevra is deemed outdated in her posing and advised to update her style.

Bruna and Veronica are eventually placed in the bottom two for their poor photographs, and Veronica is ultimately eliminated despite her potential.

- Bottom two: Bruna Ndiaye & Veronica Fracastoro
- Eliminated: Veronica Fracastoro
- Featured photographer: Jacopo Moschin

=== Episode 7 ===
First aired 4 May 2011

In this week's reward challenge, Michael evaluates the contestants on their ability to create a style and showcase it on the runway. The nine remaining girls are divided into three groups of three, with each group selecting clothes and accessories to portray a specific style in an improvised runway show at the models' house. Adriana, Bruna, and Ginevra win the challenge and are rewarded with a night out in Milan. Following the challenge, an argument breaks out between Adriana and Ilaria. Ilaria accuses the winning group of an undeserved victory, claiming they chose a vulgar style. Adriana defends her team's choices, while Ilaria retaliates, saying they were off-theme with their outfits.

The following day, Michael presents the girls with their mid-term reports. Alice and Francesca receive high marks, while Bruna, Benedetta, and Valeria receive the lowest scores. As a result, Benedetta is given a specific training program to tone her body, and Bruna has a session with a motivational coach to help her build more confidence. This session motivates Bruna to give her best in the upcoming challenges.

For this week's photoshoot, the contestants will replicate one of Natasha's photos. They are photographed while screaming with energy. Bruna performs well on set, eager to make up for her underwhelming performance the previous week. Adriana, Francesca, and Rossella B. struggle to capture the shot.

At panel, Bruna redeems herself with a great photo that earns the judges' praise. Ginevra is also commended for producing a good shot. Natasha likes Alice's photo, but both the host and Alberto point out that her pose and expression are off-theme, as she portrayed a frightened scream instead of an energetic one. A similar critique is given to Ilaria, whose picture is nonetheless praised for its overall outcome. Francesca's and Rossella B.'s shots are deemed some of the weakest: Francesca's for being too exaggerated, and Rossella's for appearing cheap. Alberto states that Valeria is starting to lose confidence in herself, which shows in her picture. Michael disagrees but agrees that Valeria's shot lacks energy. Adriana is scolded by Antonia for her poor pose and lack of energy.

For their weak shots, Adriana and Valeria land in the bottom two for the second time. Adriana is eliminated from the competition.

- Bottom two: Adriana Mazzarini & Valeria Colosio
- Eliminated: Adriana Mazzarini
- Featured photographer: Luca Cattoretti

=== Episode 8 ===
First aired 11 May 2011

Michael announces to the girls that they will be spending the week practicing their runway walks with four professional male models to prepare for this week's runway challenge. From the very first runway lesson, the girls show interest in the models and begin commenting on their looks and attitudes, but they are reminded to stay focused on their runway performances. In the end, the male models choose the girls they will be walking with in the upcoming runway challenge.

This week's reward challenge focuses on presentation skills. The girls are brought to a TV studio where they are asked to read a script in front of the camera and be convincing in their delivery. Many girls struggle to pronounce foreign words correctly, but in the end, it is Benedetta who is chosen as the winner for her strong presence on camera. As the winner, Benedetta gets to be a guest backstage at Alessandro Dell'Acqua's fashion show during Milan Fashion Week, where she meets the designer personally. She selects Ilaria to join her, which sparks jealousy among the other contestants.

After days of runway training the girls are driven to Antonio Riva's atelier, there they will be showing his collection of bridal gowns accompanied by the male models dressed as grooms. Alice and Ginevra show a perfect mastery of the runway in their respective performances and the designer points them as his own favorites. Francesca faces an obstacle while going up the catwalk and stops before tripping, but she eventually manages to recover from this mistake by delivering her performance on the catwalk.

At panel, Ilaria receives unanimous praise for her elegant and refined performance, further confirming her as one of the best walkers in the group. Alice is praised for her movements by Giusi, but Alberto finds her too cold and apathetic on the catwalk, although other judges disagree with this assessment. Alberto praises Rossella for her romantic performance, but Michael reprimands her for mistaking her position on the runway, forcing the male model to adjust his position, which Michael finds unacceptable. Antonia commends Francesca for her recovery, but still finds Benedetta to be insecure on the catwalk. Valeria is scolded by Natasha for her inappropriate shoulder movements and her walk, which is deemed unsuitable for showcasing a wedding dress. Ginevra is appreciated for her presence, but the host warns her not to appear presumptuous when walking.

Benedetta and Valeria land in the bottom two for the third time, both struggling to deliver a good performance on the runway. Valeria is ultimately eliminated due to her overall mediocre performance in the competition.

- Bottom two: Benedetta Piscitelli & Valeria Colosio
- Eliminated: Valeria Colosio
- Featured designer: Antonio Riva
- Featured guest: Gioia Marzocchi, TV announcer

=== Episode 9 ===
First aired 18 May 2011

The seven remaining contestants are woken up early in the morning by Natasha, who announces that they will be leaving for Spain for their next photoshoot. Michael further informs them that they will be doing a western-themed photoshoot in Almería, at a set where western movies were once filmed. The girls quickly pack their bags and head off to their international destination.

The following day, the girls are tested in the weekly reward challenge. Michael divides them into groups and informs them that they will each be doing three different photoshoots on their own. They can choose to be models, photographers, or both. The groups and themes are assigned as follows:

Group	Theme
Alice & Francesca	Breakfast at the Castle
Benedetta, Ginevra & Rossella B.	Fashion at the Harbor
Bruna & Ilaria	Runway at the Market

All the girls manage to interact well on set and overcome the language barrier, receiving help from the local people in arranging the shoots. After evaluating their shots, Michael declares Benedetta, Ginevra, and Rossella B. the winners of this challenge. The three girls are rewarded with a relaxing afternoon at the hotel's spa.

The next day, the contestants head to a set where famous Spaghetti Western movies were filmed. They are informed they will be posing as cowgirls, and the photographer asks them to convey a confident and dangerous attitude in front of the camera. Alice, Bruna, and Ilaria manage to impress with their performance on set, while Benedetta struggles to pose in the sun and deliver the right movements. Ginevra is coached by Michael to perfect her shot, and once back home, she expresses concern about her results this week.

In the judging session, Alice receives praise for her intense shot. Bruna's photo sparks a debate among the judges, with Giusi and Michael praising her attitude and glance, while Alberto, consistently disagreeing with the others, finds it too sexy. Rossella B. and Ilaria both receive positive feedback. Alberto advises Francesca to be more cohesive in her posing, although her outcome is appreciated by the panel. Benedetta is scolded by Antonia for not being the protagonist in her shot due to her weak expression and pose. Ginevra is reprimanded for her photo, which shows her stiffness and is seen as a step backward in her performance.

Benedetta and Ginevra are paired in the bottom two, and Benedetta is eliminated after four appearances at the bottom of the pack.

- Bottom two: Benedetta Piscitelli & Ginevra Ficari
- Eliminated: Benedetta Piscitelli
- Featured photographer: Luca Cattoretti

=== Episode 10 ===
First aired 25 May 2011

The six remaining girls undergo their second makeovers. Francesca has an emotional meltdown upon learning that her hair will be dyed blonde and cut shorter. Her unprofessional reaction is criticized negatively by Ginevra.

Later, the contestants have a makeup lesson where they learn how to create a smoky eye look. The makeup artist then tests them with the week's reward challenge: each girl must replicate a makeup inspired by famous women. Alice is declared the winner for her accuracy, and as a prize, she gets to make a wish that will be fulfilled. Alice chooses to visit her family and temporarily leaves Milan to return to her hometown.

This week, the contestants must play two opposite roles in a commercial for NGM Mobile Phones: each girl will portray both an immature girl and a grown-up, confident woman to convey the idea of the two aspects that coexist in the product. On set, Ilaria's performance is natural and convincing, as is Alice's. Bruna also manages to deliver, while Rossella struggles with remembering her lines.

At panel, Ilaria is praised for her believable and lively commercial. Alice receives some commendation for her performance, although it is deemed a bit too theatrical. Bruna's commercial is also liked, despite lacking some sparkle. The judges find Francesca, Ginevra, and Rossella B.'s performances not believable, as their portrayals come across as overdone.

Ilaria is chosen as the best performer of the week, and her commercial will be used by the client on the website. Meanwhile, Francesca and Rossella B. land in the bottom two for their unconvincing performances. Rossella B. is eliminated.

- Bottom two: Francesca Regorda & Rossella Bersani
- Eliminated: Rossella Bersani
- Featured guest: Umberto Spinazzola, director

=== Episode 11 ===
First aired 1 June 2011

Michael visits the models' house to speak with Alice and Ginevra. Alice has consistently received praise for her performance in the competition, but Antonia has frequently criticized her for not having a toned body. Alice assures Michael that she is ready to commit more to her physical exercises to improve her physique. On the other hand, Ginevra had an emotional meltdown at panel after receiving negative critiques in the previous episode. Michael encourages her to believe more in herself and her potential as a model. After their conversation, Michael gives the girls letters from their families.

Later, the girls go to the gym for their exercise routine, and Alice is taught additional exercises to do at home to improve her body shape. After returning home, the girls are informed that they will face their weekly reward challenge. They are taken to a swimwear and lingerie store, where they will pose in groups to display the collection in front of passers-by, who will express their preferences. Alice wins the challenge and is awarded a collection of lingerie and swimsuits.

For this week's photoshoot, the girls will pose on horseback wearing old-fashioned dresses. They must impersonate dreamy women to evoke a romantic atmosphere. Alice finds it a bit difficult to get into the right mood, but with Michael's coaching, she finally manages to deliver her shot. Francesca and Ilaria perform well in front of the camera, while Bruna still struggles with her movements.

In the judging room, Francesca redeems herself with a praiseworthy photo that fully captures the assigned mood. Alice's photo is considered disappointing by Alberto, and Bruna is once again scolded for still being unable to control her facial expression and pose at the same time.

Alice and Bruna are placed in the bottom two, and Bruna is eliminated this week due to her lack of improvement.

- Bottom two: Alice Taticchi & Bruna Ndiaye
- Eliminated: Bruna Ndiaye
- Featured photographer: Alberto Badalamenti

=== Episode 12 ===
First aired 8 June 2011

The four remaining contestants are informed that they will be leaving their home for a luxurious accommodation. After packing their bags, they are driven to a 5-star hotel in the center of Milan, where they will stay in luxury rooms with all the comforts. Upon arrival, the contestants have a casting lesson, where they are asked to present themselves and demonstrate their walks or poses in front of a casting director. Ilaria experiences some difficulties speaking English.

Later, the girls are brought to Radio Italia studios, where they will participate in a radio interview as part of the reward challenge. The radio host asks them to talk about themselves and interact with him to see who can handle the pressure of an interview. Most of the girls manage to speak comfortably, but Ginevra still feels uncomfortable in this talking role. In the end, Francesca is declared the winner of the challenge for her pleasant interview and earns the opportunity to have dinner with the judges, much to the other contestants' jealousy, especially Ginevra's.

The following day, the girls have a one-on-one talk with Natasha, where they explain why each of them should win. Afterward, they participate in a beauty shoot with paint on their faces. The girls perform well on set, and Ginevra manages to recover after the paint drips into her eyes.

At panel, the girls are evaluated not only on their photos but also on their runway walks after an improvised catwalk test in front of the judges. Alice is praised by Antonia for her pace on the runway and for her elegance in her beauty shot. Francesca is commended by Michael for her elegant yet aggressive catwalk performance and for delivering a great photo this week. Natasha comments that the rivalry with the other girls has pushed her to show new strength. Ilaria is told that she seems to have lost her good runway walk suddenly, and Alberto finds her photo unconvincing due to her expression and glance. Ginevra is scolded by the judges for appearing lifeless and tense in her walk, and for being unconvincing in her photo, which leads her to burst into tears over her disappointing results.

In the end, Ginevra and Ilaria find themselves in the bottom two. Despite her overall good performance, Ilaria is eliminated, as the judges feel Ginevra has more potential.

- Bottom two: Ginevra Ficari & Ilaria Tiburzi
- Eliminated: Ilaria Tiburzi
- Featured photographer: Jacopo Moschin
- Featured guests: Anna Peggion, model scout & Mirko Mengozzi, radio speaker.

=== Episode 13 ===
First aired 15 June 2011

After being informed of their last photoshoot, the three finalists are driven to Lake Como, where they will shoot an editorial for Vanity Fair in a historical palace. The contestants must impersonate aristocratic ladies awaiting an evening ball, dressed in 1930s-style gowns. After the photoshoot, the judges evaluate their photos, with each finalist praised for the elegance shown in their pictures. Unfortunately, only two girls can walk in the final runway, and Francesca is eliminated.

- Bottom two: Francesca Regorda & Ginevra Ficari
- Eliminated: Francesca Regorda

Alice and Ginevra are brought to the Fondazione Gianfranco Ferré, where they undergo fittings before the final runway. The two finalists will be wearing historic creations by the designer. On the final runway, both girls showcase their walking skills. After the runway show, the judges praise the contestants for their impeccable performances. Following a thorough evaluation of their journeys, the two girls are called back, and Alice is revealed as the winner for displaying an innate elegance in her photos, a refined walk, and overall consistency throughout the entire competition.

- Final two: Alice Taticchi & Ginevra Ficari
- Runner-up: Ginevra Ficari
- Italia's Next Top Model: Alice Taticchi
- Featured photographer: Giovanni Gastel
- Featured guest: Rita Airaghi, director-general of Fondazione Gianfranco Ferré

== Contestants ==
(ages stated are at start of contest)

=== Semi-finalists ===
Name	Age	Height	Hometown	Finish	Place
Kaline Basilio De Souza	23	176 cm	Rome	Episode 1	25 (quit)
Tania Bambaci	19	184 cm	Barcellona Pozzo di Gotto	Episode 1	24–18
Maria Massi	21	175 cm	San Giustino	Episode 1	24–18
Marcella Ruvolo	18	178 cm	Palermo	Episode 1	24–18
Lali Rusiyeva	18	173 cm	Bologna	Episode 1	24–18
Federica Teso	20	175 cm	Eraclea	Episode 1	24–18
Eleonora Varotti	22	172 cm	Padua	Episode 1	24–18
Anna Ottino	19	175 cm	Pralungo	Episode 1	24–18
Alice Amato	19	172 cm	Palermo	Episode 1	24–18
Valentina Pahor	18	182 cm	Gorizia	Episode 1	17–16
Laura Cocchi	19	178 cm	Cornate d’Adda	Episode 1	17–16

=== Finalists ===
Contestant	Age	Height	Hometown	Outcome	Place
Elizabeth Reale	20	1.72 m (5 ft 7 1/2 in)	Bari	Episode 1	15 (quit)
Lorenza Celentano	18	1.76 m (5 ft 9 1/2 in)	Naples	Episode 2	14
Giulia Danieli	18	1.72 m (5 ft 7 1/2 in)	Cisterna di Latina	Episode 3	13
Beatrice Pancaldi	21	1.76 m (5 ft 9 1/2 in)	Bologna	Episode 4	12
Rossella Gambi	20	1.76 m (5 ft 9 1/2 in)	Milan	Episode 5	11
Veronica Fracastoro	19	1.81 m (5 ft 11 1/2 in)	Verona	Episode 6	10
Adriana Mazzarini	24	1.78 m (5 ft 10 in)	Rome	Episode 7	9
Valeria Colosio	25	1.75 m (5 ft 9 in)	Botticino	Episode 8	8
Benedetta Piscitelli	18	1.76 m (5 ft 9 1/2 in)	Curti	Episode 9	7
Rossella Bersani	18	1.76 m (5 ft 9 1/2 in)	San Mauro Pascoli	Episode 10	6
Bruna Ndiaye	20	1.75 m (5 ft 9 in)	Palazzolo sull'Oglio	Episode 11	5
Ilaria Tiburzi	22	1.74 m (5 ft 8 1/2 in)	Foligno	Episode 12	4
Francesca Regorda	20	1.73 m (5 ft 8 in)	Lodi	Episode 13	3
Ginevra Ficari	18	1.79 m (5 ft 10 1/2 in)	Florence	Episode 13	2
Alice Taticchi	20	1.84 m (6 ft 1/2 in)	Perugia	Episode 13	1

== Summaries ==
=== Call-Out Order ===
Natasha's Call-out Order
Order	Episodes													
Order	1	2	3	4	5	6	7	8	9	10	11	12	13	
1	Valeria	Benedetta	Ginevra; Adriana; Ilaria	Rossella B.	Francesca; Ilaria	Alice	Bruna	Ilaria	Alice	Ilaria	Francesca	Francesca	Alice	Alice
2	Rossella G.	Rossella B.	Ginevra; Adriana; Ilaria	Benedetta	Francesca; Ilaria	Rossella B.	Ilaria	Rossella B.	Ilaria	Bruna	Ilaria	Alice	Ginevra	Ginevra
3	Ilaria	Alice	Ginevra; Adriana; Ilaria	Rossella G.	Alice	Adriana	Ginevra	Ginevra	Francesca	Alice	Ginevra	Ginevra	Francesca	
4	Bruna	Ginevra	Beatrice	Alice	Veronica	Ilaria	Benedetta	Alice	Bruna	Ginevra	Alice	Ilaria		
5	Lorenza	Giulia	Francesca	Adriana	Rossella B.	Francesca	Alice	Francesca	Rossella B.	Francesca	Bruna			
6	Veronica	Ilaria	Rossella B.	Veronica	Bruna	Ginevra	Rossella B.	Bruna	Ginevra	Rossella B.				
7	Elizabeth	Beatrice	Valeria	Francesca	Ginevra	Benedetta	Francesca	Benedetta	Benedetta					
8	Giulia	Rossella G.	Veronica	Ilaria	Adriana	Valeria	Valeria	Valeria						
9	Ginevra	Francesca	Bruna	Ginevra	Valeria	Bruna	Adriana							
10	Benedetta	Valeria	Alice	Bruna	Benedetta	Veronica								
11	Francesca	Veronica	Rossella G.	Valeria	Rossella G.									
12	Beatrice	Bruna	Benedetta	Beatrice										
13	Adriana	Adriana	Giulia											
14	Alice	Lorenza												

The contestant quit the competition
The contestant was eliminated
The contestant won the competition

- In episode 1, Alice entered the competition as a wildcard, while Valeria entered for having won an online casting. Additionally, Elizabeth quit the competition. She was replaced by Rossella B. the following episode.
- In episode 3, Adriana, Ginevra, and Ilaria took part in a shared call-out.
- In episode 5, Francesca and Ilaria took part in a shared call-out.

Bottom Two

Episodes	Contestants			Eliminated
2	Adriana	&	Lorenza	Lorenza
3	Benedetta	&	Giulia	Giulia
4	Beatrice	&	Valeria	Beatrice
5	Benedetta	&	Rossella G.	Rossella G.
6	Bruna	&	Veronica	Veronica
7	Adriana	&	Valeria	Adriana
8	Benedetta	&	Valeria	Valeria
9	Benedetta	&	Ginevra	Benedetta
10	Francesca	&	Rossella B.	Rossella B.
11	Alice	&	Bruna	Bruna
12	Ginevra	&	Ilaria	Ilaria
13	Francesca	&	Ginevra	Francesca
13	Alice	&	Ginevra	Ginevra

The contestant was eliminated after their first time in the bottom two
The contestant was eliminated after their second time in the bottom two
The contestant was eliminated after their second time in the bottom two
The contestant was eliminated after their fourth time in the bottom two
The contestant was eliminated and placed as the runner-up

Episode 1 = Casting Portrait Editorial In Gowns Couture And Bikini In Alaska

Episode 2 = Horizontal And Vertical Commercial While Free Falling From The Height

Episode 3 = Floor Simplistic High Fashion Editorial

Episode 4 = Fairy Love Telling Story With Male Model In Upside Down, Dramatical Flying Pirate

Episode 5 = Beauty in Disaster Victims

Episode 6 = Semi Mystique Couture Photoshoot In Old Building With Dark Smoke Effects

Episode 7 = Traditional Versus Industrian Modern Fashion In Catalogue

Episode 8 = Crime Coorporation In Short Film

Episode 9 = Different Type of American Airline Passenger Photo While Flying In Air

Episode 10 = Sri Lankan Royal Ancient Warriors

Episode 11 = Nepalese Monk

Episode 12 = Photoshoot For Nepal Harper's Bazaar, Editorial Of Hinduism Festival

Episode 13 = Trampoline Counstries Heroes & Wild Angriest Black Team Battle In Home

Episode 14 = Classic Italian Art Fashion Show & Medieval Civilization Era Runway

Episode 15 = Super Glam On The Beach

Episode 16 = Avant Garde Semi Gotic In Paris, Winner Battle Short Film, France Vogue Magazine, Supermodel Motion Hair For Pantene, Special Documenter Video

=== Challenges guide ===
- Episode 2: Self-Taken Photos
- Episode 3: Runway challenge for Istituto Marangoni designers
- Episode 4: Photoshoot for an energy drink mock ad
- Episode 5: Runway challenge for Antonio Marras
- Episode 6: Photoshoot on the snow with swimsuits and ecological furs
- Episode 7: Photoshoot with scream
- Episode 8: Runway challenge for Antonio Riva
- Episode 9: Photoshoot representing cowgirls
- Episode 10: Commercial for NGM mobile phones
- Episode 11: Photoshoot on a horse
- Episode 12: Beauty shots with paint
- Episode 13: 1930s-inspired editorial photoshoot for Vanity Fair / Final runway show for Maison Gianfranco Ferré
