= Italia's Next Top Model season 1 =

Italia's Next Top Model
- Season 1
- No. of episodes: 13

Release
- Original network: SKY Vivo
- Original release: December 4, 2007 – February 26, 2008

Season chronology
- Next → Season 2

The first season of the Italian reality television show Italia's Next Top Model premiered on SKY Vivo on 4 December 2007 and concluded on 26 February 2008.

The show was hosted by Russian former model and actress Natasha Stefanenko. The other permanent judge was Michael Giannini, the art director and talent scout of model agency d’Management. The recurring judges were photographer Ciro Zizzo, former model Nadège du Bospertus, and Italian fashion journalist Giusi Ferré.

The season was won by Gilda Sansone, who received a one-year contract with the d’Management Group as well as a spread in Italian fashion magazine Elle.

== Episodes ==
=== Episode 1 ===
First aired December 4, 2007

After arriving in Milan, the contestants meet Natasha Stefanenko and Michael Giannini, who welcome the girls to the loft that will be their home during their modeling competition. After the first elimination challenge is announced, the girls improvise a runway show by creating a look with their own outfits and make-up.

In the judging room, Natasha introduces the judges, among whom is Danda Santini, editor of Italian Elle. Most of the girls are criticized for how they walk and look. Lorena is praised for her walk, although found to be a bit aggressive, Elga is said to have a good basic walk, Tiziana is noticed for her look despite her insecurity, and Alessandra is complimented for regaining her composure after tripping.

Francesca L. and Annalisa are ranked as the bottom two for their performances and Annalisa is eliminated for the look she chose.

- Bottom two: Annalisa & Francesca L.
- Eliminated: Annalisa
- Guest judge: Danda Santini, editor of Italian Elle magazine

=== Episode 2 ===
First aired December 11, 2007

The girls are sent to the Aldo Coppola hair salon to receive makeovers. Some, such Elga and Francesca L., whose hair is cut short, are excited and accept changes, while others, such as Lorena, have difficulties. Elena dislikes her blonde-dyed hair and shouts that she does not want to have her hair cut.

Afterwards, the contestants have their first photo shoot with photographer and judge Ciro Zizzo. They choose outfits and makeup reflecting their styles or personalities. Some contestants, such as Tiziana, have no issues with the photo shoot, while others, such as Agnese, find it difficult.

| Contestant | Style |
|---|---|
| Agnese | Ironic |
| Alessandra | Techno |
| Elena | Feline |
| Elga | Captivating |
| Fiorella | Romantic |
| Francesca B. | Oversized Spirit |
| Francesca L. | Simple |
| Gilda | Sexy |
| Laura | Rebel |
| Lorena | Sensual |
| Manuela | Scamp |
| Sara | Elegant |
| Tiziana | Tomboy |

At the judging panel, former model Randy Ingerman reprimands some of the girls, believing that their looks are not original enough. Tiziana impresses the judges, while Elena is scolded for her demeanor and for appearing unprofessional.

Agnese and Elena are placed in the bottom two, with Agnese being eliminated for failing to portray her personality in her photos and not putting effort into the photo shoot.

- Bottom two: Agnese & Elena
- Eliminated: Agnese
- Guest judges: Randy Ingerman (former model) and Marta Citacov (fashion journalist)

=== Episode 3 ===
First aired December 18, 2007

The twelve remaining girls learn makeup techniques from Pablo Ardizzone, a makeup expert. They then take part in their first reward challenge by testing and demonstrating their makeup skills. Manuela wins the challenge and picks Francesca B. and Sara to enjoy a dinner in a restaurant in Milan.

The aspiring models are also told that they will be posing in an Adam and Eve–themed photo shoot where they will interact with a professional male model while holding a snake. Some contestants carry out the task and manage to handle the snake, except for Tiziana, whose fear causes her to refuse the reptile.

The same day, the group of girls confronts Elena for not keeping the house clean. Elga, Francesca B, Francesca L., Gilda, and Tiziana complain about her attitude, and after Elena's refusal to talk with Francesca B. and Gilda about the issue, Elga flies into a rage. Natasha visits the girls the following day to admonish them for their behavior and warns them to adopt a more controlled way of behaving, making known her disappointment and anger with them.

Later on, the girls are evaluated in the judging room, where Tiziana's image is impressive despite her fear of snakes. Alessandra is complimented for using her facial structure to her advantage, and so is Elga, for softening her look in her picture. Gilda, Francesca B, and Francesca L. are also noticed for interacting with the male model, whereas Manuela and Sara are criticized for not being comfortable on set and showing this in their photos.

After deliberation, Manuela and Sara land as the bottom two, both for not interacting with the elements of the photo shoot; and Sara is eliminated for not moving her body.

- Bottom two: Manuela & Sara
- Eliminated: Sara
- Special guest: Pablo Ardizzone, make-up artist

=== Episode 4 ===
First aired December 25, 2007

The eleven remaining girls get a visit from Alberto Zanoletti, the vice editor of Italian Elle, who puts them through the week's reward challenge by giving each of them a small budget to create a hippie look. Elga wins the challenge and is allowed to make a phone call to a loved one; she decides to share her prize with Francesca L. The girls are happy to hear from their loved ones after being isolated in the competition housing.

Later on, the girls go to the Maison Romeo Gigli, where they face an elimination challenge. There, they meet fashion designer Gentucca Bini, who assigns each contestant an outfit that they will model while being evaluated.

In the judging room, Tiziana, Lorena, and Alessandra receive praise for making the most of their outfits and improving their runway walks, while Francesca B. is criticized for her walk; Gilda is criticized as well. Elena is scolded for hiding her outfit and for how she uses her jacket, while Francesca L. is reprimanded for walking quickly, and thus not showing her dress well.

Elena and Francesca L. are paired as the bottom two both for not showing the product they were supposed to sell and for their walks. Francesca L. is sent home for not being able to show improvements on the runway.

- Bottom two: Elena & Francesca L.
- Eliminated: Francesca L.
- Guest judge: Gentucca Bini, fashion designer of Maison Romeo Gigli
- Special guest: Alberto Zanoletti, vice-editor of Italian Elle magazine

=== Episode 5 ===
First aired January 1, 2008

The ten remaining contestants receive a visit from Italian journalist and fashion expert Cristina Parodi, who puts them through a written test to evaluate their knowledge of fashion. Francesca B. wins the challenge and shares her prize with Gilda; as a result, both contestants go to a Roberto Cavalli store to choose outfits for themselves.

Afterwards, the girls are taken to a 19th-century villa near Milan to participate in an evening fashion show that displays 1930s-inspired dresses. The contestants must walk down a scenographic staircase, which worries some of them, causing them difficulty in completing the task.

At the panel, Fiorella, Lorena, and Gilda are praised. Francesca B.'s performance is perceived as awkward, Alessandra is told to have an embarrassing walk, Elga's performance disappoints the judges, and Elena is scolded for her expression and walk.

Elga and Elena are given the two lowest rankings and Elena is eliminated after the judges decide that she hasn't improved enough over the course of the show.

- Bottom two: Elena & Elga
- Eliminated: Elena
- Guest judge: Cristina Parodi, journalist, and fashion expert

=== Episode 6 ===
First aired January 8, 2008

Former top model and show judge Nadège du Bospertus pays a visit to the girls' loft to test their progress on the catwalk with a reward challenge. The girls must walk on a runway and step on a rotating platform at the end of it without falling or tripping. Elga and Lorena are given the highest rankings, with Lorena being chosen as the winner and being allowed to get a visit from her mom.

For their photo shoot, this week the contestants are taken to a billiard hall where they will be photographed almost nude in different positions by Malena Mazza, who is known for her style of photo shoots. Despite her initial fear of showing her body, Laura manages to participate. Tiziana must be coached to get her picture.

At the panel, the judges complain about Manuela's lack of intensity, but the photographer supports the girl. Gilda, Lorena, Elga, and Tiziana receive good feedback, but Alessandra's and Laura's performances are criticized.

Laura and Alessandra are ranked as the bottom two, with Alessandra being eliminated, since the judges feel as though she has reached a maximum amount of improvement and cannot go further in the competition.

- Bottom two: Alessandra & Laura
- Eliminated: Alessandra
- Guest judge: Malena Mazza, fashion photographer

=== Episode 7 ===
First aired January 15, 2008

After receiving Natasha's letter that tells the girls to prepare for a jump, the remaining contestants take part in their weekly reward challenge: they will be posing as boxers jumping on an elastic carpet while being photographed by Ciro Zizzo. Francesca B. ends up as the winner and can spend an evening out with her boyfriend.

This week the girls will take part in a fake commercial for a perfume where they will be directed by Gaetano Vaudo. Easy gestures become difficult for many while being taped, and the challenge proves to be harder than expected.

At the judging panel, Elga is found to be the most natural, but the majority of the aspiring models are reprimanded for failing in the task, in particular Laura, Lorena, and Manuela.

Manuela and Lorena land in the bottom two spots for their lackluster performances, but it is Manuela who is sent home for producing another disappointing result and not progressing at all.

- Bottom two: Lorena & Manuela
- Eliminated: Manuela
- Guest judge: Gaetano Vaudo, director

=== Episode 8 ===
First aired January 22, 2008

The seven remaining contestants pay a visit to the Italian Elle offices to meet the magazine's chief fashion director, Benedetta Dell'Orto, who evaluates them in this week's reward challenge, which consists of enhancing a simple outfit with proper accessories in order to represent each girl's assigned look for a happening as follows:

| Contestant | Assigned Look |
|---|---|
| Elga | Cocktail with Friends |
| Fiorella | Evening Cocktail |
| Francesca B. | Working Dinner |
| Gilda | Concert at Opera |
| Laura | Wedding |
| Lorena | Casting for a Photographer |
| Tiziana | Rock Concert |

Fiorella is proclaimed the winner and she is sent to a Fratelli Rossetti shoe store to choose a pair of elegant shoes as her prize.

For this week's photoshoot the girls must pose next to a vintage car, in male and female vintage clothes to show both sides of their personalities. Elga bursts into tears when Ciro, the photographer, criticizes her, while Tiziana shines again.

During the judging session, Elga, despite producing a good picture, is scolded for crying unprofessionally, Lorena and Tiziana are praised for creating interactions between their male and female photos. Francesca B. is reprimanded for being awkward and not feminine, while Fiorella is deemed boring.

After deliberation, Francesca B. and Fiorella are placed as the bottom two for producing bad photos, and Fiorella is eliminated as the judges feel that Francesca B. has more potential.

- Bottom two: Fiorella & Francesca B.
- Eliminated: Fiorella
- Guest judge: Francesco Martini Coveri, fashion designer
- Special guest: Benedetta Dell'Orto, chief fashion editor of Italian Elle magazine

=== Episode 9 ===
First aired January 29, 2008

The girls receive a makeover adjustment and are sent to a fashion store where they meet the owner and designer Matteo Denti, and Whisky, a Japanese stylist. Denti and Whisky teach the contestants how to dress in Harajuku girls' style and subsequently put them to the test by asking them to create a Harajuku look using colorful clothes available in the store. Once again, thanks to her fashion knowledge, Francesca B. wins the challenge and chooses to share her prize with Elga, which turns out to be a shopping discount, to use in the designer's store, and a massage in a spa.

For this week's elimination challenge, the six remaining contestants are brought to Carlo Pignatelli's atelier where they will be modeling different wedding dresses and be evaluated on their ability to interpret the assigned outfit. Each dress represents a certain type of bride:

| Contestant | Bride |
|---|---|
| Elga | Classic |
| Francesca B. | Feminine |
| Gilda | Elegant |
| Laura | Angry |
| Lorena | Romantic |
| Tiziana | Futuristic |

At the judging panel Elga is highly praised for developing a perfect walk and showing the dress properly, Lorena and Gilda are complimented too. Laura's walk is found to be a bit overdone; Tiziana and Francesca B. are reprimanded for their poor performances.

Francesca B. and Tiziana land in the bottom two for their bad walks, and Francesca B. is sent packing because the judges feel that her over-confidence prevented her from improving her manly runway walk.

- Bottom two: Francesca B. & Tiziana Piergianni
- Eliminated: Francesca B.
- Guest judge: Carlo Pignatelli, fashion designer
- Special guests: Mauro Situra, hairstylist of Aldo Coppola Hair Salon, Matteo Denti, designer and fashion expert, Whisky, Japanese stylist.

=== Episode 10 ===
First aired February 5, 2008

Michael sends the five remaining contestants to a casting call for a snack commercial, where they meet professional models. Elga is the most natural in front of the video camera, Tiziana still shows shyness and does well when not self conscious about being taped. Soon after Michael explains that that was not a proper challenge but a simple test and invites all the girls to an evening out with him.

The elimination challenge this week is an extreme photoshoot with the renowned photographer Settimio Benedusi. The contestants must pose in a building under construction wearing leather lingerie while holding flamethrowers.

In the judging session, Lorena gets compliments for her strong look, Tiziana produces a good picture despite her insecurity, and Elga is told to have been lucky in her shot.

Gilda and Laura are deemed banal in their shoots, so they are put in the bottom two, and in the end, Laura is sent home for being too average and not memorable to the judges.

- Bottom two: Gilda Sansone & Laura
- Eliminated: Laura
- Guest judge: Settimio Benedusi, fashion photographer

=== Episode 11 ===
First aired February 12, 2008

This week Elga and Gilda are fed up with Tiziana's persistent insecurities. Elga tries to shake her, since they are almost at the final round, but Tiziana avoids talking about herself. So, Elga and Gilda decide to give up, stating that Tiziana always uses her insecurities as an excuse. But there is no time for arguing since the contestants must pack their bags and fly to Ibiza.

The reward challenge this week consists of an interview with the models' judge, fashion journalist Giusi Ferré. Lorena handles herself well and wins the prize, which consists of a phone call to her boyfriend while the other 3 girls must prepare dinner for her.

The next day in Ibiza the girls visit all the trendy clothing shops and are helped to improve their personal styles by the show's stylist, Susanna Ausoni. Later on, they arrive at a beach surrounded by a lunar landscape where they will pose in bad weather for a swimsuit photoshoot, wearing metallic and colorful bathing suits.

Back in Italy, at the judging panel, the girls are ultimately tested on their runway walks before evaluation. The contestants walk in bathing suits to show the judges how improved they are. During the deliberation, tensions arise between the judges. Ciro states that Elga is not able to pose, but all the others find Elga's shot captivating. Gilda is highly praised for overcoming her sexiness and thus producing a sensual and elegant photo, but Giusi Ferré still finds her a bit rough. Tiziana is criticized for her insecurity but gets praised for being more confident in the photoshoot. Lorena reveals herself not to be the type of girl for swimsuit photoshoots because of her thin body and facial structure.

After a long deliberation, Lorena and Tiziana are paired as the bottom two and, thanks to her constant improvements, Lorena is spared. Tiziana is thus eliminated because the judges feel that, despite having the most potential of all, her self-confidence shown this week was too little too late to keep her in the competition.

- Bottom two: Lorena & Tiziana Piergianni
- Eliminated: Tiziana Piergianni
- Special guest: Susanna Ausoni, stylist and look-maker

=== Episode 12 ===
First aired February 19, 2008

The three finalists take part in their individual editorial beauty photoshoots, each one portraying a different mood. All the girls do well, but Lorena goes through a moment of insecurity.

At judging, all the girls receive good critiques for their editorial look. After deliberation, Natasha calls all of them in front of her and congratulates them on their progress. The first girl called is Gilda, followed by Elga. Lorena is eliminated.

- Bottom two: Elga & Lorena
- Eliminated: Lorena

After congratulating each other, Gilda and Elga are taken to Roberto Cavalli's where they are prepared for the final runway, there they meet fashion designer Eva Cavalli who will attend the show. Each one walks in three different gowns and are praised by Eva for being elegant and professional.

At the final panel, Elga is highly praised for her walk and Gilda for her transformation from a sexy ordinary girl into a classy runway model. Following the deliberation about the girls' portfolios, Natasha calls Elga and Gilda back into the room, and Gilda is proclaimed the first Italia's Next Top Model thanks to her progress and her fresh look.

- Final two: Elga & Gilda Sansone
- Runner-up: Elga
- Italia's Next Top Model: Gilda Sansone

=== Episode 13 ===
First aired February 26, 2008

The episode shows what Gilda is up to after winning the competition. It includes the various photoshoots for the Italian edition of Elle magazine, where Gilda will be featured.

== Contestants ==
(ages stated are at start of contest)

| Contestant | Age | Height | Hometown | Finish | Place |
|---|---|---|---|---|---|
| Annalisa Bianconi | 20 | 1.79 m (5 ft 10 1/2 in) | Bologna | Episode 1 | 14 |
| Agnese Mantovani | 22 | 1.76 m (5 ft 9 1/2 in) | Jesolo | Episode 2 | 13 |
| Sara Martini | 18 | 1.78 m (5 ft 10 in) | Arezzo | Episode 3 | 12 |
| Francesca Limiti | 24 | 1.76 m (5 ft 9 1/2 in) | Rome | Episode 4 | 11 |
| Elena Cisonni† | 19 | 1.79 m (5 ft 10 1/2 in) | Treviso | Episode 5 | 10 |
| Alessandra Bettoja | 20 | 1.79 m (5 ft 10 1/2 in) | Verona | Episode 6 | 9 |
| Manuela Mazzoni | 18 | 1.78 m (5 ft 10 in) | Prato | Episode 7 | 8 |
| Fiorella Amadei | 19 | 1.76 m (5 ft 9 1/2 in) | | Episode 8 | 7 |
| Francesca Benedetto | 20 | 1.81 m (5 ft 11 1/2 in) | Turin | Episode 9 | 6 |
| Laura Ferraro | 23 | 1.75 m (5 ft 9 in) | Bassano del Grappa | Episode 10 | 5 |
| Tiziana Piergianni | 22 | 1.78 m (5 ft 10 in) | Milan | Episode 11 | 4 |
| Lorena Stra | 22 | 1.80 m (5 ft 11 in) | Alba | Episode 12 | 3 |
| Elga Blasetti | 23 | 1.77 m (5 ft 9 1/2 in) | L'Aquila | Episode 12 | 2 |
| Gilda Sansone | 18 | 1.76 m (5 ft 9 1/2 in) | Salerno | Episode 12 | 1 |

== Call-Out Order ==
Natasha's Call-out Order
| Order | Episodes | | | | | | | | | | | | |
| Order | 1 | 2 | 3 | 4 | 5 | 6 | 7 | 8 | 9 | 10 | 11 | 12 | 13 |
|---|---|---|---|---|---|---|---|---|---|---|---|---|---|
| 1 | Winifrey | Fioni | Beatrix | Salima | Winifrey | Astrid | Bernadette | Bernadette | Virginia | Astrid | Fioni | Bernadette | Fioni |
| 2 | Laura | Vivi | Winifrey | Fioni | Fioni | Dedra | Giselle | Astrid | Fioni | Bernadette | Bernadette | Fioni | Bernadette |
| 3 | Dedra | Dedra | Vivi | Bernadette | Dedra | Virginia | Fioni | Dedra | Astrid | Virginia | Virginia | Virginia | |
| 4 | Beatrix | Astrid | Bernadette | Astrid | Nomusha | Bernedette | Nomusha | Virginia | Bernadette | Fioni | Astrid | | |
| 5 | Fioni | Nomusha | Dedra | Virginia | Giselle | Nomusha | Dedra | Fioni | Bridgette | Bridgette | | | |
| 6 | Virginia | Bridgette | Salima | Bridgette | Bernadette | Salima | Bridgette | Bridgette | Dedra | | | | |
| 7 | Vivi | Virginia | Giselle | Nomusha | Astrid | Giselle | Astrid | Nomusha Giselle | | | | | |
| 8 | Bridgette | Beatrix | Bridgette | Vivi | Virginia | Bridgette | Virginia | Nomusha Giselle | | | | | |
| 9 | Astrid | Giselle | Nomusha | Dedra | Salima | Fioni | Salima | | | | | | |
| 10 | Salima | Cinnie | Fioni | Giselle | Bridgette | Winifrey | | | | | | | |
| 11 | Giselle | Salima | Virginia | Winifrey | Vivi | | | | | | | | |
| 12 | Cinnie | Bernadette | Astrid | Beatrix | | | | | | | | | |
| 13 | Bernadette | Winifrey | Cinnie | | | | | | | | | | |
| 14 | Nomusha | Laura | | | | | | | | | | | |
| 15 | Monika | | | | | | | | | | | | |

The contestant was eliminated
The contestant won the competition

=== Bottom Two ===
| Episodes | Contestants | | | Eliminated |
|---|---|---|---|---|
| 1 | Annalisa | & | Franchesca L. | Annalisa |
| 2 | Agnese | & | Elena | Agnese |
| 3 | Manuela | & | Sara | Sara |
| 4 | Elena | & | Franchesca L. | Franchesca L. |
| 5 | Elena | & | Elga | Elena |
| 6 | Alessandra | & | Laura | Alessandra |
| 7 | Lorena | & | Manuela | Manuela |
| 8 | Franchesca B. | & | Fiorella | Fiorella |
| 9 | Franchesca B. | & | Tiziana | Franchesca B. |
| 10 | Gilda | & | Laura | Laura |
| 11 | Lorena | & | Tiziana | Tiziana |
| 12 | Elga | & | Lorena | Lorena |
| 12 | Elga | & | Gilda | Elga |

The contestant was eliminated after their first time in the bottom two
The contestant was eliminated after their second time in the bottom two
The contestant was eliminated after their second time in the bottom two
The contestant was eliminated and placed as the runner-up

Episode 1 : Wild And Nude Sexy Body Like A Tribe In Vanuatu

Episode 2 : Fight Underwater Represent Bold And Strong Personality

Episode 3 : Personality Motion Video, Makeover Covershoot

Episode 4 : Innocent Beauty In Traditional Chinese Village In Yunan

Episode 5 : Myanmar's Royal Princess In Upscale Fashion Editorial

Episode 6 : Garbage Campaign In Yamuna River With Glamour Dresses

Episode 7 : Indian Romance With Male Model

Episode 8 : High Fashion Couture In Himalayan Mountains

Episode 9 : Lux Photoshoot With Flower And Lux Television Commercial

Episode 10 : Unexpected Pose To Be Great High-End Fashion Catalogue

Episode 11 : Avant Garde Fashion Exotic With (Bling-Bling, Glow Stick, Black Glitter, Mozaik)

Episode 12 : Top 3 Individual Special Music Video

Episode 14 : Harper's Bazaar High Class Magazine, High Fashion Avant Garden, Beauty Shoot For L'Oréal, Elegant Browsure For Volkswaggen, Black And White Motion Editorial

=== Challenges guide ===
- Episode 1: Improvised fashion show
- Episode 2: Photoshoot representing the girls' styles or personalities
- Episode 3: Garden of Eden-inspired photoshoot with a snake and a male model
- Episode 4: Runway challenge for Maison Romeo Gigli
- Episode 5: Runway challenge on a staircase with 1930s-inspired gowns
- Episode 6: Nude photoshoot in a billiard hall
- Episode 7: Mock commercial for a perfume
- Episode 8: Photoshoot in male and female vintage dresses
- Episode 9: Runway challenge for Carlo Pignatelli
- Episode 10: Photoshoot holding flamethrowers in leather lingerie
- Episode 11: Swimsuits photoshoot in Ibiza
- Episode 12: Editorial beauty shots
- Episode 12: Final runway show for Roberto Cavalli
