= Italia's Next Top Model =

- Also known as: INTM
- Genre: Reality
- Created by: Tyra Banks
- Presented by: Natasha Stefanenko
- Judges: Natasha Stefanenko (1–4); Michael Giannini (1-4); Nadège du Bospertus (1-3); Giusi Ferré (1-4); Ciro Zizzo (1-2); Settimio Benedusi (2); Antonia Dell'Atte (4); Alberto Badalamenti (4)
- Opening theme: Gwen Stefani - The Sweet Escape (1–2); Gwen Stefani - The Sweet Escape Konvict Remix (3); Magnetic Man - I Need Air (4)
- Country of origin: Italy
- Original language: Italian
- No. of seasons: 4
- No. of episodes: 38

Production
- Producer: Magnolia Tv
- Production locations: Milan, Italy
- Running time: 60 minutes (including commercials)

Original release
- Network: SKY Uno
- Release: December 4, 2007 – June 15, 2011

Italia's Next Top Model (English: Italy's Next Top Model; abbreviated as INTM) is an Italian reality television show hosted by Natasha Stefanenko and based on Tyra Banks' America's Next Top Model. It is broadcast on SKY Uno, a channel of the Italian Pay Television SKY Italia. The first season premiered in December 2007 and soon became popular among viewers.

== Show format ==
The show is mainly taped in Milan, one of the most important capitals of fashion where the girls stay during the competition.

Each season of Italia's Next Top Model features 14-15 aspiring models and airs in 12-13 episodes. In each episode one contestant is eliminated except for the final episode when two eliminations take place, although double eliminations have also occurred. Makeovers are administered to the girls early in the season, usually after the first elimination. Photoshoots in destinations outside of Milan or Italy are also scheduled, usually in the second half of the competition. Each episode covers the events of roughly a week of real time and features a reward challenge, an elimination challenge (photo shoot, runway, or a commercial), and then the judging of the girls' performances, which leads to the elimination of one contestant.

An episode usually shows the contestants receiving training in an area concurrent with the job of a model. For example, contestants may get coached in runway walking, applying make-up to suit various occasions, improving knowledge of fashion or fashion business, and developing a personal style. A related challenge soon follows to show what the girls have learned, for example a mock runway show, and a judge chooses a winner. She receives some prize, such as clothing, some spare time in Milan, or the chance to phone home since the contestants of Italia's Next Top Model cannot keep in touch with their families or friends while the show is being taped.

In the first three seasons daily episodes were also aired to show the girls' life in their house and teachings given to them: usually lessons on runway walk and posing, meetings with a life coach, lessons with nutritionists and physical training.

The judging panel originally included four permanent judges: the host Natasha Stefanenko, Russian former model and actress who is popular in Italy and equals the role of Tyra Banks as the head of the search in the original series; former top model, Gianni Versace's and Giorgio Armani's muse, Nadège du Bospertus, Michael Giannini who also appeared on ANTM season 2 of America's Next Top Model's go-sees episode and is the art director and talent scout of d'Management Group; the fourth judge is the noted Italian fashion journalist Giusi Ferré. Other judges often showing up at the panel in the first two seasons were the recurring photographers: photographer Ciro Zizzo and renowned photographer Settimio Benedusi and they both also worked alternatively with the girls in many of their photo shoots. In season 3 the panel was joined by a guest judge changing each week while the panel changed in season 4 when former top model Nadege was replaced by former top model Antonia Dell'Atte, Giorgio Armani's muse in the 1980s and photographer Alberto Badalamenti became another permanent judge.

Several well-known faces from the Italian fashion industry made an appearance on the show, including important fashion designers such as Gentucca Bini for Maison Romeo Gigli, Francesco Martini Coveri, Carlo Pignatelli, Eva Cavalli, Rossella Jardini for Moschino, Chantal Thomass, Maurizio Modica & Pierfrancesco Gigliotti of Frankie Morello, Manuel Facchini for Byblos, fashion designer John Richmond, Elio Fiorucci, Antonio Riva, Dean and Dan Caten from DSquared2 and Antonio Marras. Top models such as Bianca Balti, Kartika Luyet and Alena Seredova made an appearance on the show as well.

At the end of the first season Gilda Sansone emerged victorious. Sansone subsequently enjoyed success in the model business working with well-known artists such as photographer Annie Leibovitz.

The second season started in September 2008 with the selection of the final 14 among the 30 semifinalists chosen in the previous castings throughout Italy. Michela Maggioni ended up being the winner, thus getting a one-year contract with d'Management and becoming the face of Max Factor 2009 Italian campaign.

The third season was aired in Fall 2009 with some changes in the format such as the introduction of a public in the studio where judgment and eliminations took place and a runway challenge to determine who among the 2 worst girls each week would be eliminated. It was reported that about 1,500 aspiring models have applied for castings. Anastasia Silveri succeeded in taking the title, resulting in the first winner with no appearances in the bottom two.

A fourth season was aired in Spring 2011 with a return to the original format with no more public in the studio. Alice Taticchi earned the win, thus gaining a contract with Fashion Models Milan and an editorial for Lancôme.

=== Differences with ANTM & criticism ===
Both the American and Italian Top Model shows share a similar structure with challenges, judging and elimination.

However, Italia's Next Top Model developed features on its own: first of all, not every episode includes a photo shoot since the elimination challenge could consist of a runway challenge, where the girls are asked to interpret or make the most of different ranges of outfits. Another difference is the administration of two makeovers to the girls, one at the beginning of the competition and one halfway through when the group has been reduced to seven contestants. Also, for its first 3 seasons INTM has been structured in both weekly episodes - with one girl's elimination - and daily episodes - aired to show what the aspiring models learn in the modeling school.

The main difference from the original American format was introduced in season 3. The judging session was held in front of an audience with the judges openly voting for the girl at the bottom they want to evict from the competition, after the two worst girls of each week have performed in a runway challenge to help the judges decide. These changes were not well received by the public who immediately felt disappointed in watching a show that did not reflect the American format anymore, thus losing suspense and cohesiveness. The new format was also criticized for introducing guest judges not related to the fashion world but rather being TV celebrities with very little knowledge of modelling and poor judging skills which made the show lose credibility in the viewers' eyes. The viewers also criticized the production for focusing too much on clashes in the daily episodes and for trying to create tensions among the girls in the judging studio by showing them videos of themselves talking behind one another's backs. The new process of elimination made the episodes less entertaining, as well as the removal of the weekly reward challenges subsequently shown in daily episodes, with lower-quality tasks and prizes. Heavy criticism has also affected the general production of the show and its photoshoots, often deemed poorer than the original version in planning, execution and outcome and repetitive in themes always focusing on sexy shoots.

In season 4 the show returned to its original format without an audience at elimination and no more open eviction vote from the judges. Daily episodes were also removed in favour of more developed weekly episodes.

== Judges ==
Judge/Mentor	Cycle			
Judge/Mentor	1 (2007)	2 (2008)	3 (2009)	4 (2011)
Hosts
Natasha Stefanenko	Head Judge	Head Judge	Head Judge	Head Judge
Judging Panelists
Nadège du Bospertus	Main	Main	Main	
Giusi Ferré	Main	Main	Main	Main
Michael Giannini	Main	Main	Main	Main
Ciro Zizzo	Main	Main		
Settimio Benedusi		Main		
Alberto Badalamenti				Main
Antonia Dell'Atte				Main

== Cycles ==
Cycle	Premiere date	Winner	Runner-up	Other contestants in order of elimination	Number of contestants	International Destinations
1	4 December 2007	Gilda Sansone	Elga Blasetti	Annalisa Bianconi, Agnese Mantovani, Sara Martini, Francesca Limiti, Elena Cisonni, Alessandra Bettoja, Manuela Mazzoni, Fiorella Amadei, Francesca Benedetto, Laura Ferraro, Tiziana Piergianni, Lorena Stra	14	Ibiza
2	23 September 2008	Michela Maggioni	Elena Ripamonti	Claudia Boi, Mary Balducci, Noemi Del Falco, Claudia Cuomo, Diletta Venturoli, Claudia Manzella, Giulia Galizia, Amy Doukoure, Giada Folcia, Giorgia De Nunno, Martina Cioffi, Beatrice Coos	14	None
3	2 October 2009	Anastasia Silveri	Anisia Tripa Calugaru	Athina Covassi, Jade Albany Pietrantonio (quit), Veronica Testa, Eleonora Meneghini, Carlotta Castagneris, Elisa Provaso, Karis Decò, Diletta Neri, Gilda Testa, Giorgia Albarello, Marianna Di Martino De Cecco, Caroline Cecere, Sabrina Cereseto	15^{1}	Barcelona; Marseille
4	30 March 2011	Alice Taticchi	Ginevra Ficari	Elizabeth Reale (quit), Lorenza Celentano, Giulia Danieli, Beatrice Pancaldi, Rossella Gambi, Veronica Fracastoro, Adriana Mazzarini, Valeria Colosio, Benedetta Piscitelli, Rossella Bersani, Bruna N'Diaye, Ilaria Tiburzi, Francesca Regorda	15^{2}	Almería

^1 In season 3 the original pool of 16 girls was reduced. For the show's rules only 14 girls could make it into the final cast; the 2 semi-finalists Giada Combusti and Veronica Valentini were not credited in the official opening sequence. This number expanded to 15 girls when Marianna replaced Jade after she decided to quit the competition.

^2Original finalist Elizabeth Reale picked in the live final casting episode quit before the beginning of the tapings and was replaced by semi-finalist Rossella Bersani
