= Fog and Crimes =

- Country of origin: Italy
- Original language: Italian
- No. of seasons: 3
- No. of episodes: 14

Original release
- Network: Rai 2
- Release: November 30, 2005 – October 23, 2009

Nebbie e delitti is an Italian crime television series. It is distributed as Fog and Crimes in the United States and Canada.

== Cast ==
- Luca Barbareschi: Inspector Soneri
- Natasha Stefanenko: Angela Cornelio
- Gianluca Gobbi: Juvara
- Giuseppe Antignati: Draghi
- Mariano Rigillo: Capuozzo

Guest stars

- Valeria Sabel (Ghitta Tagliavini, episode: L'affittacamere, 2005)
- Lucrezia Lante Della Rovere (Elvira Codoppi, episode: L'affittacamere, 2005)
- Francesco Salvi (Commissario Bondan, episode Bersaglio - l'oblio 2005)
- Ivano Marescotti (episode Casa di bambola 2007)
- Daniela Poggi (episode La amico ritrovato 2007)
- Sara D'Amario (episode Carte false 2007)
- Roberto Herlitzka (episode La stanza segreta 2009)
- Valeria Cavalli (episode Ragazzi di buona famiglia 2009)

== See also ==
- List of Italian television series
