= Anastasia Silveri =

Italian model

- Born: Anastasia Silveri; June 9, 1984 (age 42); Moscow, Russian SFSR, USSR
- Modeling information
- Height: 1.77 m (5 ft 9.5 in)
- Hair color: Blond
- Eye color: Blue/Green
- Agency: Joy Model Management Milan, Joy Model Management Istanbul

Anastasia Silveri (born June 9, 1984) is a Russian-born Italian fashion model and the winner of the third cycle of Italia's Next Top Model.

== Early life ==
Anastasia was born in Moscow, only child of Italian father and Russian mother. At the age of 8 her family moved to Italy in her father's home region. There Anastasia completed her high school studies and started modelling locally.

== Italia's Next Top Model ==
From the very beginning of the competition Anastasia appeared as the front-runner for the title with her skilled runway walk and her elegance in posing. Her self-confidence and ability to model soon made her the main contestant of her cycle, leading to a heated competition especially with fellow contestant Anisia Tripa. Despite being portrayed as the tough and ruthless competitor, Anastasia however revealed a softer side when she stated she did not consider herself beautiful and fearing she could not model because of her age. Anastasia's determination and ability to impress the panel gained her a spot in the final two, where she eventually beat Anisia Tripa on the final runway challenge thus earning a long-awaited opportunity to start her modeling career she had previously delayed for school, relationship, or family reasons.

== Career ==
Anastasia appeared in her Max Factor campaign and in an editorial spread on Italian magazine A. A few months after her win Anastasia Silveri switched to Joy Models Management Milan. She modeled for Royal Cashmere 2010 campaign and walked in IED ModaLab 2010 in Milan for emerging designers Gianluca Maccaferri, Paola Puro, Camilla Wildfang, Costanza Amato and Barbara Gallo and also walked for Aquilano.Rimondi, Pauline van Dongen, Andreea Musat, Katrin Kafka, Karisia Paponi, Averil Blakely at Mittelmoda fashion award 2010. Anastasia modeled in photoshoots and campaigns for Giovanni Grillotti S/S 2011 collection, Max Casting by Settimio Benedusi, Z.one Concept F/W 2010/2011, Ovyé by Cristina Lucchi F/W 2010/2011 and S/S 2011, A-Lab Milano S/S 2011, Gattinoni Sposa prêt-à-porter 2011 lookbook. She walked at the S/S 2011 Milan Fashion Week for C'N'C Costume National. She appeared in various editorials on StileIn Magazine, We&You Magazine, the BundPic Magazine, MFLiving magazine, L'Autre magazine and DeluxxDigital magazine. She modeled for Manila Grace S/S 2010 and Pako Litto F/W 2010/2011. Anastasia was featured in editorials on Turkish magazines such as Cosmopolitan, ALL magazine, Super magazine and XOXO. She modeled for Roberto Avolio F/W 2011/2012 and S/S 2012 campaigns, AngelsNeverDie F/W 2011/2012, Premiata F/W 2011/2012, Rokail F/W 2011/2012, Mowan and Mitù Hair fashion. She has been the face of MirkoG. Di Brandimarte collections since 2011.

Preceded by Michela Maggioni	Italia's Next Top Model winner Cycle 3	Succeeded by Alice Taticchi
