= Alice Taticchi =

Italian model

- Born: 25 June 1990 (age 36); Perugia, Umbria, Italy
- Modeling information
- Height: 1.84 m (6 ft 0 in)
- Hair color: Brown
- Eye color: Brown
- Agency: Fashion Model Management Milan

Alice Taticchi (born 25 June 1990) is an Italian fashion model and beauty pageant titleholder. She is the winner of the fourth cycle of Italia's Next Top Model.

== Early life ==
Coming from an upper-middle-class family, Taticchi had been hoping to become a model since her teenage years. Therefore, despite her father's initial objections, she began to compete in beauty pageants in order to start a modelling career. She went on winning different pageants, and represented Italy at Miss World 2009. These successes helped her in gaining self-confidence and overcoming her shyness due to her height. Taticchi is also a former volleyball player and one of her hobbies is playing the piano.

== Italia's Next Top Model ==
Taticchi was noted since the beginning of the competition for being a disciplined contestant and a refined girl. When the viewers voted for their favourites among the semifinalists she was not among the original top 12 contestants but was given a wildcard by the judges to join as the 13th finalist. During the competition she was often reminded that, in order to improve as a model, she had to tone her body. However, her sophisticated manners, her humble and hard-working nature, her elegance in posing as well as her ability on the catwalk and her overall consistency always impressed the judges and earned her a spot in the finals and her eventual win.

== Career ==
Since being chosen as the Italian representative on Miss World 2009 Taticchi started to model locally. After winning Italia's Next Top Model, Cycle 4 she is going to be represented by Fashion Model Management Milan and appeared on an editorial for Lancôme on Grazia. She walked at Alta Roma Alta Moda for high fashion designers such as Gattinoni, Abed Mahfouz, Jamal Taslaq, Nino Lettieri. Alice has been featured on the Mercedes Benz 2012 Italian calendar and modelled for Vetrine magazine. She modelled in campaigns, catalogues, photoshoots and fashion shows among which Moraiolo, Prénatal, More by Siste's, Famiglia Cristiana, Carlo Bay hair, l'Oréal hair, Elsa Sposi.

Preceded by Anastasia Silveri	Italia's Next Top Model winner Cycle 4	Succeeded by None
