= Michela Maggioni =

Italian model

- Born: April 20, 1988 (age 38); Brussels, Belgium
- Modeling information
- Height: 1.81 m (5 ft 11 in)
- Hair color: Blond
- Eye color: Green (EU) 84-61-88
- Agency: d'Management, Mannequin Studio, Silent Models, Storm Models, New York Model Management, PMA Models, Stage Models

Michela Maggioni (born April 20, 1988 in Brussels, Belgium) is an Italian fashion model and winner of the second cycle of Italia's Next Top Model.

== Early life ==
Born in the Belgian city of Brussels, Maggioni lived most of her life in Gorgonzola, Lombardy and after graduating she started studying philosophy at university in Milan. Interested in modelling, in her post-win interview on Sky website she declared she followed Cycle 1 jealously and immediately applied for Cycle 2. After joining the Milanese modelling industry she stated she will also continue her studies and hopes to become an independent woman and maybe a mother one day.

== Italia's Next Top Model ==
Maggioni was recognized for her demeanor and her performance in photography. However, the judges noted a lack of consistency in the runway challenges and, near the conclusion of the competition, placed her in the bottom two for her performance during a photo shoot. From that experience, Michela regained strength in the final tasks and eventually managed to deliver a convincing runway walk in the final runway for Byblos. This improvement together with her inborn skill in producing good photos earned her the title of Italia's Next Top Model.

== Career ==
After the show Michela signed with d'Management Group and became the face for the 2009 Max Factor Italian Campaign.
She is also known as Michela Legrand. In January 2009 she walked for Etro F/W 2009/2010 and appeared on Italian Glamour magazine and one in Italian Marie Claire Bis. Michela was featured as the face of the S/S 2009 collection of Italian clothing brand Northland. and appeared in a spread on Italian weekly magazine A.

Michela has modeled in the Vivocity Fashion Week in Singapore where she also walked for Soo Kee jewellery. In Singapore she modeled for iLoveHansel clothing line. There Maggioni also became the face for the print campaign of the F/W 2009 collection of Reckless Ericka and walked in Singapore Fashion Festival for Alldressedup in a runway show featured on Cycle 4 of Germany's Next Topmodel where she also appeared to give advice to the three finalists. She was featured in an editorial spread on Harper's Bazaar Singapore and two spreads for luxury lifestyle magazine Icon Singapore. Maggioni became the face for the F/W 2009/2010 collection of Charles and Keith. She was featured in an editorial spread on Italian Amica magazine and walked for John Richmond at Milan Fashion Week and for Maison Martin Margiela at Paris Fashion Week. Michela has appeared in an editorial spread on Italian Glamour and on the S/S 2010 lookbook of ToyG. She modeled for Bergdorf Goodman and Neiman Marcus sale collections and for Jonathan Simkhai F/W 2010/2011 collection at New York Fashion Week. Michela Maggioni also modeled for Uniqlo and appeared on the July 2010 issue of Ginza Magazine.

Preceded by Gilda Sansone	Italia's Next Top Model winner Cycle 2	Succeeded by Anastasia Silveri
