= Marco Coretti =

Italian fashion designer

Marco Coretti (born in Rome) is an Italian fashion designer. After studying arts he moved to Paris, where he trained as apprentice and then worked as an assistant in haute couture ateliers.

In 1997, he returned to Italy, where he created his first couture accessories and shoes line, gaining interest from both press and celebrities such as Sophia Loren and Madonna.

In 1999 the launch of his own brand followed, with an 'extreme white' collection in the Camera Nazionale della Moda Italiana fashion week: he was praised for the launch of the 'new-chic' style.

In 2001 Béatrice Dalle destroyed a black dress of his worth thousands of euros while closing the runway at the Rome's fashion week.

In 2004 he became creative director at Sorelle Fontana; in the following year he was chosen by the Municipality of Rome and AltaRoma as art director of The Ages of Fashion, a project meant for the recovery of Italian haute couture.

He has collaborated with artists such as Carla Accardi, Luigi Ontani, Paola Gandolfi and famous photographers as Gian Paolo Barbieri, Michel Comte, Alberta Tiburzi and others. In 2010 he created the costumes for the Mvula Sungani's show for the fiftieth anniversary of the dancer Raffaele Paganini.
