= Nadège du Bospertus =

French top model (born 1968)

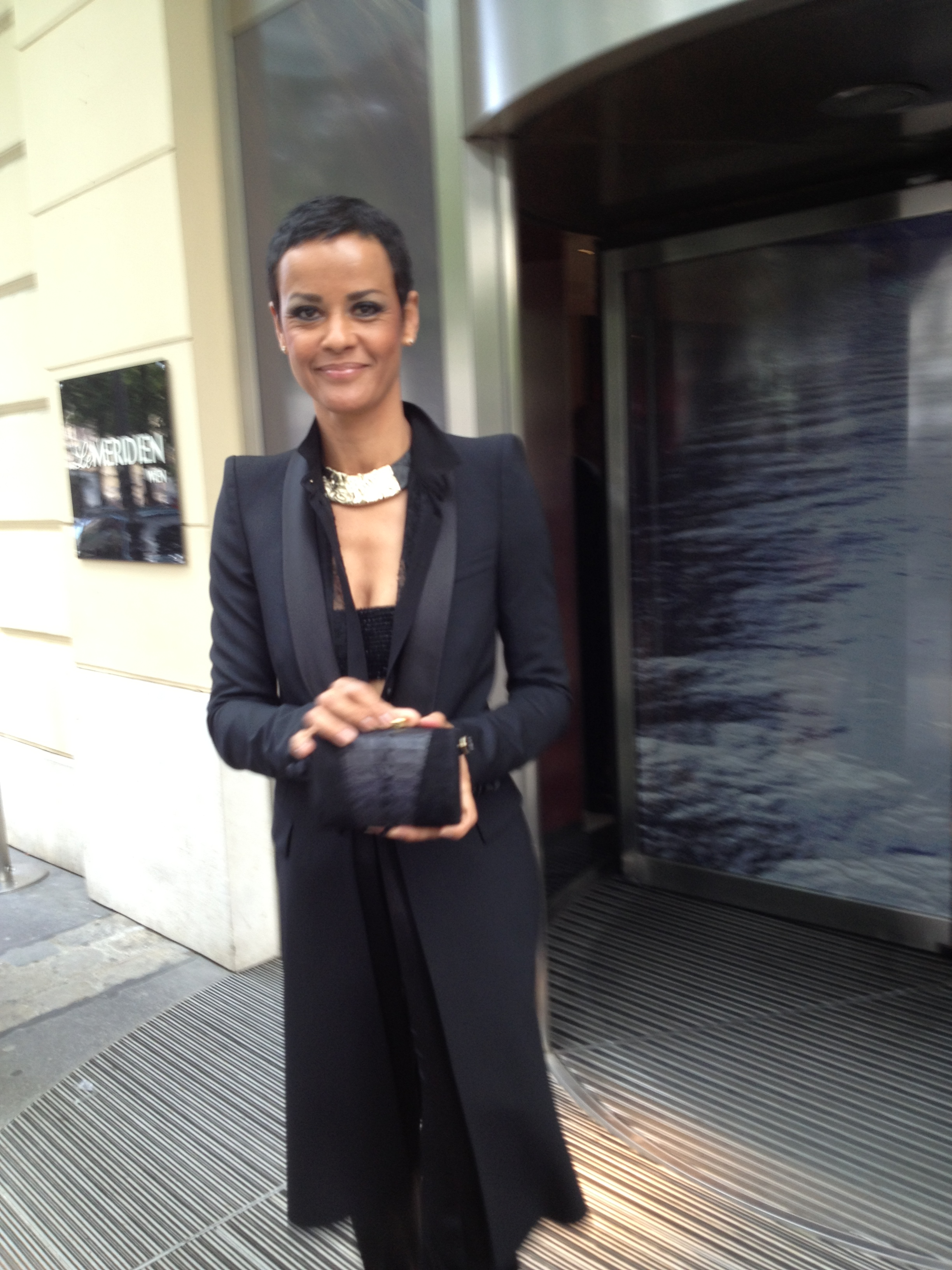
- Nadège du Bospertus (Vienna 2013)
- Born: March 16, 1968 (age 58); Montfermeil, France
- Occupations: Model, TV personality
- Modelling information
- Height: 5 ft 10 in (1.78 m)
- Hair colour: Black
- Eye colour: Brown
- Agency: d'management group (Milan)

Nadège du Bospertus is a French supermodel and former judge on Italia's Next Top Model. She was the muse of Giorgio Armani and Gianni Versace as a supermodel during the 1990s.

== Early life ==
Du Bospertus was born in Montfermeil, France. She studied economics until 1988, when she was spotted on a street in Paris by a young photographer. She is of Réunionnais descent through her mother.

== Career ==
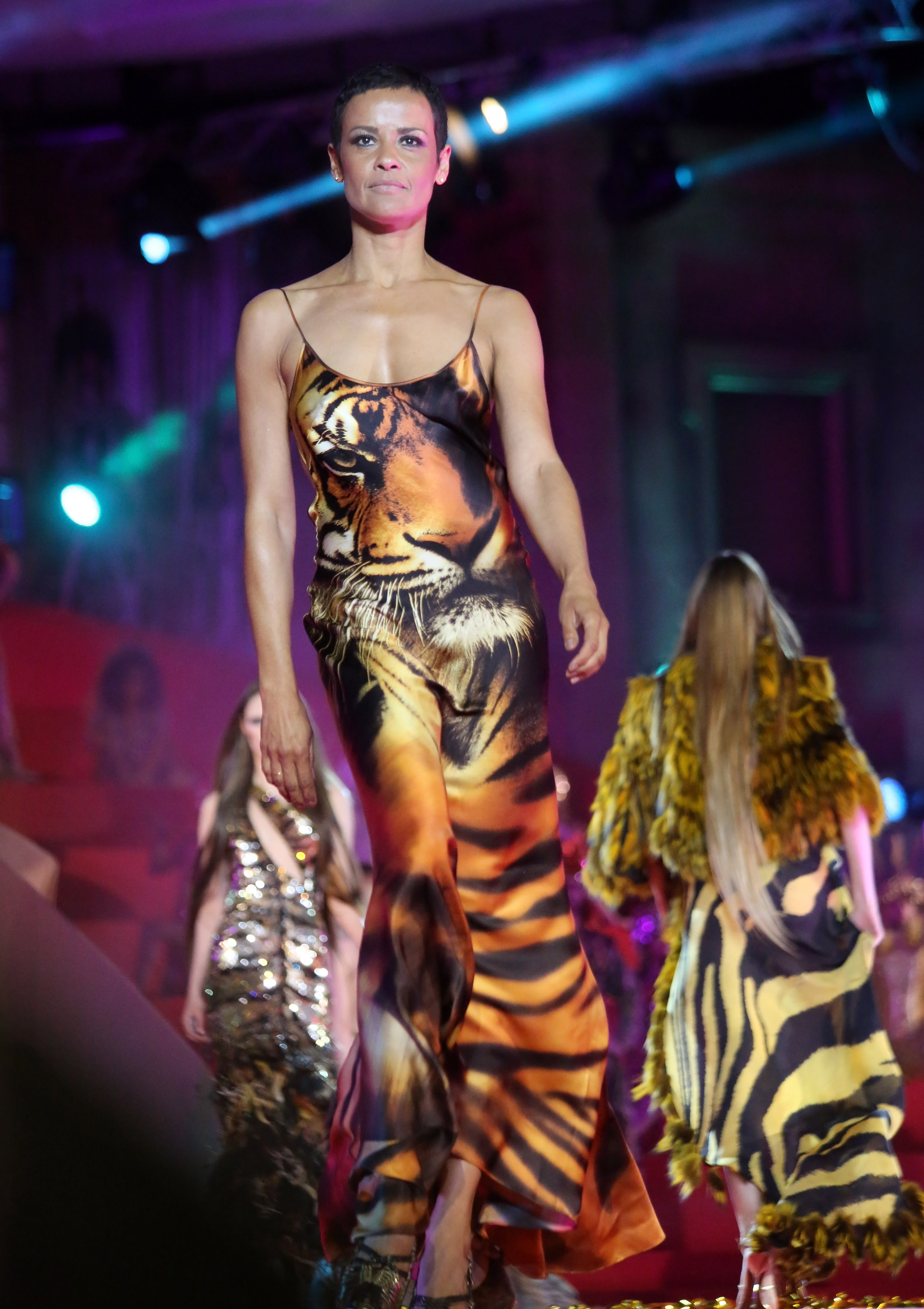
Nadège du Bospertus (Cavalli fashion show at Life Ball 2013)

Her first photo shoot was for the cover of the July 1989 issue of 20 Ans, photographed by Barbro Anderson. Four months after du Bospertus started modelling, she was booked by Herb Ritts for a shampoo advertisement, and became known for her very short black hairstyle and haircut. She was featured on the covers of fashion magazines including Vogue, Marie Claire, Elle, Mademoiselle, and Vogue Paris, and worked with photographers such as Albert Watson, Steven Meisel, Patrick Demarchelier, Tiziano Magni, Gilles Bensimon, and Bruce Weber.

She appeared in fashion editorials and advertising campaigns for designers including Giorgio Armani, Ralph Lauren, Chanel, Marco Coretti, Escada, Fendi, Kenzo, Missoni, Sportmax, Strenesse, Emanuel Ungaro, Versace, Yves Saint Laurent, Levi's, and Versus.

On the runway, she walked for designers such as Azzedine Alaïa, Karl Lagerfeld, Oscar de la Renta, Christian Dior, Valentino, Marco Coretti, Versace, Dolce & Gabbana, Chanel, Carolina Herrera, Giorgio Armani, Oscar de la Renta, Krizia, Laura Biagiotti, Les Copains, Claude Montana and Roberto Cavalli.

In 1995, she co-hosted the TV series Déjà Dimanche which is broadcast every Sunday on French television.

Du Bospertus made special appearances on the catwalk for Roberto Cavalli's spring and summer 2000 show and the DSquared² spring and summer 2009 show.

In 1999, Mercedes-Benz featured her in their European television advertisements for the Smart car.

In April 2002, she returned to the runway to celebrate 25 years of Gianfranco Ferré. That season, she was also featured in the ad campaign for the Italian cashmere house Maria di Ripabianca, photographed by Michelangelo Di Battista.

In 2007, she became a judge on Italia's Next Top Model as the most demanding among the judges. She stayed for three seasons and was eventually replaced by former model Antonia Dell'Atte.

In early 2009, she catwalked for Etro during their autumn-winter 2009/10 Men's Show and was featured in a series of pictures shot by Bob Krieger that were exhibited during the opening event at First, the Vicenzaoro jewellery fair.

Most recently she has been the testimonial for Enzo Fusco's advertising campaign which was shot by Settimio Benedusi.

Based on her career in the fashion industry, in 2012 du Bospertus collaborated with AMICA and she wrote a special fashion diary dedicated to spring and summer 2013 women's collections. She also had her first experience as a stylist for a fashion editorial dedicated to children.

== Agencies ==
- D Management Group Milano
- Mega Model Agency - Hamburg
- Storm Model Agency London
- Premier Model Management
- Milk Model Management London
- Trump Models New York
