= Natasha Stefanenko =

Russian-Italian actor-model

- Наталья Стефаненко
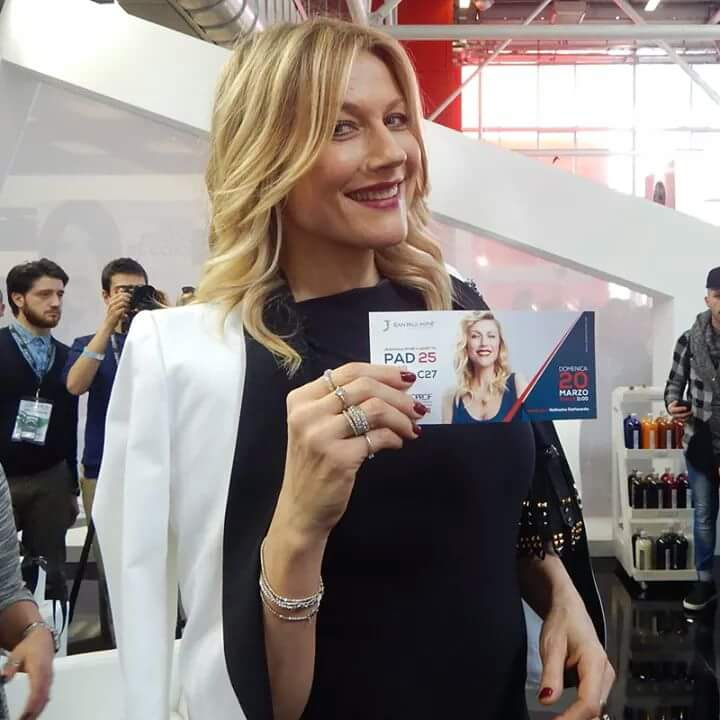
- Stefanenko in 2016
- Born: Natalya Dmitrievna Stefanenko; April 18, 1969 (age 57); Sverdlovsk, Russian SFSR, Soviet Union
- Citizenship: Russian; Italian
- Occupations: Television personality; actress; model
- Height: 185 cm (6 ft 1 in)
- Spouse: Luca Sabbioni
- Children: 1

Natalya Dmitrievna "Natasha" Stefanenko (Russian: Наталья Дмитриевна "Наташа" Стефаненко; born 18 April 1969) is a Russian and Italian actress, model, and television presenter who lives and works in both Italy and Russia.

== Early years ==
Stefanenko was born in Yekaterinburg (then Sverdlovsk), the daughter of a Belarusian-Ukrainian nuclear engineer who worked in a secret unnamed underground city, close to the Ural Mountains. She lived with her family in a closed city. They also owned a dacha beside a lake.

Stefanenko was a swimming champion in her youth, and swam with Alexander Popov. When she was a young girl she swam 10 kilometres (6.2 mi) a day. In 1984, she almost joined the Soviet Olympic swim team, but instead chose to continue with her education.

At the age of 16, Stefanenko went to study in Moscow where she earned a degree in Metal Engineering.

== Career ==
After winning the Look of the Year contest in Moscow in 1991, Stefanenko moved to Milan, where she obtained work as a model. After being scouted in a restaurant by director Beppe Recchia, she made her first television appearance on the variety show La grande sfida, alongside host Gerry Scotti. At the time, Stefanenko was unable to speak the Italian language.

She commenced her acting career with the cinematographic film La grande prugna in 1999. She played the character Angela Cornelio, one of the protagonists in the television series Nebbie e delitti (Fog and Crimes), which aired on Rai Due from 2005 to 2009. She has also hosted many programmes, including the 2001 edition of Festivalbar, which is an annual series of televised summer concerts performed by both Italian and international pop groups in town squares throughout Italy; and Italia's Next Top Model in 2009. In the same year 2009, she had a role in Mediaset Canale 5's police drama series Distretto di Polizia 9 (Police District 9). Since 2007, she is also a host of Russia's TV show Snimite eto nemedlenno, based on the British programme What Not to Wear.

She also co-starred in a 2001 advert Natasha Stefanenko : La gigantessa. She played a giantess, who unknowingly grew to a gigantic size.

== Personal life ==
In December 1995, Stefanenko married Italian entrepreneur and ex-model Luca Sabbioni, and they have one daughter, Sasha, who was born in 2000.

== Filmography ==
=== Films ===
Year	Title	Role
1999	La grande prugna	Natasha
2003	Do You Mind If I Kiss Mommy?	Lena
2011	Ex 2: Still Friends?	Olga
2020	La mia banda suona il pop	Olga

=== Television ===
Year	Title	Role	Notes
1992	La grande sfida	Herself/ Co-host	Game show (season 1)
1994	Casa dolce casa	Claudia	Episode: "Mi ritorni in mente"
1997, 2012	Per tutta la vita…?	Herself/ Co-host	Variety show (seasons 1 and 6)
1998–1999	Target	Herself/ Host	Talk show
1999–2002	Convenscion	Herself/ Co-host	Comedy show
2000	Gioco di specchi	Anya	Television film
2001	2001 Festivalbar	Herself/ Co-host	Annual music festival
2004	Le Iene	Herself/ Guest host	Variety show (March 30, 2004)
2005–2009	Nebbie e delitti	Angela Cornelio	Main role
2006	La festa della mamma	Herself/ Host	Annual event
2007	Camera Café	Herself	Episode: "La grande occasione"
2007–2011	Italia's Next Top Model	Herself/ Host	Talent show
2009	7 vite	Akina	Recurring role (season 2)
2009	Distretto di Polizia	Nadja Rostova	Recurring role (season 9)
2012	Miss Italia	Herself/ Judge	Annual beauty contest
2014	Top Model po-russki	Herself/ Host	Fashion show (season 5)
2022	Волшебная девочка кунг-фу	Наивка	Voice

== Television ==
(A partial list)

- La grande sfida (1992), variety show
- Per tutta la vita (1997), matrimonial show
- Gioco di specchio (2000), television film
- Nebbie e delitti (2005–2009), television series
- Festivalbar (2001), televised summer concerts; co-presenter
- Italia's Next Top Model (2007–2011), reality show; presenter, judge
- Снимите Это Немедленно (Russia, 2007–present), presenter
- Camera Cafe (2007), sit-com
- Quelli che....il calcio (2007)
- Distretto di Polizia 9 (2009), television series
- 7 vite 2 (2009), sit-com
- Съешьте это немедленно (Russia, 2011–present), presenter
- Топ-модель по-русски: Международный сезон (2014), reality show; presenter, judge
- Волшебной девочке кунг-фу (Russia, 2022–present) Наивка (voice)
