= Zobov =

Zobov (Russian: Зобов) or Zobova (feminine: Зобова) is a Russian surname. Notable people with the surname include:

- Inna Zobova (born 1976), Russian actress and fashion model
- Oleg Zobov (1958–1999), Russian military officer, Hero of the Russian Federation
