= Top Model po-russki season 5 =

Top Model po-russki
- Season 5
- Judges: Natasha Stefanenko; Vlad Lisovets; Denis Simachev; Ksenia Sobchak
- No. of contestants: 14
- Winner: Evgeniya Nekrasova
- No. of episodes: 12

Release
- Original network: Yu-TV
- Original release: October 26 – December 28, 2014

Season chronology
- ← Previous; Season 4

Top Model po-russki season 5 (subtitled as Топ-модель по-русски: Международный cезон) (English: Top Model in Russian: International season) was the fifth and final installment of the Russian adaptation of Tyra Banks' America's Next Top Model. Two years after the show's initial cancellation following the conclusion of season 4, it was announced that the show would be returning with a fifth season. This cycle featured returning panel members of previous cycles, including Vlad Lisovets (cycles 2 and 3), and Ksenia Sobchak (host, cycles 1-3), as well as a new judge, Denis Simachev. The host of the cycle was Natasha Stefanenko, who previously hosted Italia's Next Top Model during its four-year run.

The season was filmed in the summer of 2014, and aired from October to December 2014. It featured contestants from several different countries (namely Angola, Belarus, Canada, Estonia, Israel, Spain, the United Kingdom and the United States) as well as Russia. Notably, two of the contestants had previously competed on other versions of Top Model: Juste Juozapaityte, who finished in second place on cycle 7 of Britain & Ireland's Next Top Model; and Kristine Smirnova, who finished in second place on cycle 2 of Eesti tippmodell.

The prize package for this cycle included a fashion spread in Glamour magazine, a campaign for s.Oliver, a cash prize of 1,000,000 rubles, and a modelling contract with Point Model Management. The winner of the competition was 21-year-old Evgeniya Nekrasova from Kemerovo.

== Cast ==
=== Contestants ===
(Ages stated are at start of contest)

Country	Contestant	Age	Height	Hometown	Finish	Place
Spain	Anastasiya Senchukova	24	1.76 m (5 ft 9 1/2 in)	Barcelona	Episode 2	14
Russia	Aleksandra 'Sasha' Plaksina	20	1.78 m (5 ft 10 in)	Chelyabinsk	Episode 3	13
Angola	Elena Sarattseva	20	1.70 m (5 ft 7 in)	Cabinda	Episode 4	12
Belarus	Alina Hoven	18	1.70 m (5 ft 7 in)	Minsk	Episode 5	11 (quit)
Estonia	Kristine Smirnova	27	1.75 m (5 ft 9 in)	Tallinn	Episode 6	10
Russia	Sofia Shum	23	1.80 m (5 ft 11 in)	Tver	Episode 7	9
Russia	Oksana Kavali	25	1.85 m (6 ft 1 in)	Saint Petersburg	Episode 8	8
United States	Alisa Shirokova	23	1.68 m (5 ft 6 in)	Myrtle Beach	Episode 9	7
Russia	Olga Afonina	21	1.72 m (5 ft 7 1/2 in)	Moscow	Episode 10	6
Israel	Darya Li	18	1.74 m (5 ft 8 1/2 in)	Jerusalem	Episode 11	5
Canada	Mariya 'Masha' Shapovalova	21	1.80 m (5 ft 11 in)	Ontario	Episode 11	4
Russia	Tatyana Rumyantseva	23	1.78 m (5 ft 10 in)	Smolensk	Episode 12	3
United Kingdom	Juste Juozapaityte	24	1.83 m (6 ft 0 in)	London	Episode 12	2
Russia	Evgeniya Nekrasova	21	1.76 m (5 ft 9 1/2 in)	Kemerovo	Episode 12	1

=== Judges ===
- Natasha Stefanenko (host)
- Vlad Lisovets
- Denis Simachev
- Ksenia Sobchak

== Episodes ==
No. overall	No. in season	Title	Original release date
55	1	"Episode 1"	26 October 2014
The twenty semi-finalists converged in front of the Bolshoi Theatre for a public introduction with the judges. They later took on their first photo shoot, which involved posing for promotional stills and filming segments for the show's opening sequence. At the end of the episode, the judges reviewed the material and selected the final fourteen contestants.
56	2	"Episode 2"	26 October 2014
The finalists moved into their new home. They later had a runway lesson while wearing a blindfold and practiced their walks at an ice rink, where the best performer during the lesson, Kristine, was granted immunity from elimination. After having their measurements taken and analyzed, the models were taken to the Moscow Metro for their first photo shoot. At elimination, Nastya became the first contestant to leave the competition.: Special guests: Artem Krivda, Maria Fedorova, Laura Lukina; Featured photographer: Natali Arefieva
57	3	"Episode 3"	2 November 2014
The remaining contestants received makeovers, and later posed nude in a photo shoot against bullying. At elimination, Sasha became the second contestant to leave the competition.: Special guests: Andrey Drykin, Laura Lukina; Featured photographer: Lev Efimov
58	4	"Episode 4"	9 November 2014
The contestants received a fitness lesson, and had their eating habits monitored and reviewed. After an extreme session of runway practice with judge Denis Simachev, the models were photographed in the woods while posing with wild animals. At elimination, Elena became the third contestant to leave the competition.: Special guests: Ekaterina Bobrova, Julia Chekhonin, Mikhail Baryshnikov; Featured photographer: Alina Karo
59	5	"Episode 5"	16 November 2014
The remaining models had a posing and endurance challenge in which they had to pose as celebrity icons, and had to stay in character as their friends and family members attempted to break their concentration. At the shoot, the contestants had to star in a music video with Russian singer Elka for an alternative version of the song "Do You Know", featured in the opening sequence. At elimination, Alisa was eliminated when she landed in the bottom two with Alina. However, Alina quit the competition and Alisa was allowed to stay.: Special guests: Elka, Anastasia Shapovalova, Mikhail Baryshnikov; Featured director: Paul Domaine
60	6	"Episode 6"	23 November 2014
The contestants received circus and balance training from gymnast Anastasia Burdin, and later had their photos taken in a lookbook photo shoot for s.Oliver. At elimination, Kristine became the fifth contestant to leave the competition.: Special guests: Anastasia Burdin, Mikhail Baryshnikov; Featured photographer: Dmitry Iskhakov
61	7	"Episode 7"	30 November 2014
The contestants had an acting lesson with director Valeriya Gai Germanika, in which they had to portray different emotions. Later at the photo shoot, each model was assigned a different Russian fairy tale to portray. At elimination, Sofia became the sixth contestant to leave the competition.: Special guests: Valeriya Gai Germanika, Mikhail Baryshnikov; Featured photographer: Serge Outrush, Alexey Kolpakov
62	8	"Episode 8"	7 December 2014
The contestants took part in a vertical runway show, and later had a boxing photo shoot that doubled as a campaign against domestic abuse. At elimination, Oksana became the seventh contestant to leave the competition.: Special guests: Daria Agapova; Featured photographer: Dima Gushchin
63	9	"Episode 9"	14 December 2014
The remaining contestants took part in a challenge where they had to style one another, and later attended an interview in which they had to impress several guests to receive their business card. For the photo shoot, the models were photographed wearing jewelry in a beauty campaign for Pantene Pro-V. Following deliberation, Alisa became the eighth contestant to leave the competition.: Special guests: Kim Bylov, Victor Drobysh, Alexander Mostovoi, Vladimir Shirokov, Igor Udalov; Featured photographer: Ivan Kaydash
64	10	"Episode 10"	21 December 2014
Special guests: Featured photographer:
65	11	"Episode 11"	28 December 2014
Special guests: Featured photographer:
66	12	"Episode 12"	28 December 2014
Special guests: Featured photographer:

== Results ==
Order	Episodes											
Order	2 (Note: In episode 2, Kristine was granted immunity after winning that week's reward challenge.)	3	4	5 (Note: In episode 5, Alina quit the competition after learning she was safe. This automatically saved Alisa from elimination.)	6	7	8	9	10	11 (Note: Masha was eliminated outside of judging panel at the end of episode 11, following that week's judging and elimination.)		12 (Note: In episode 12, Tatyana was eliminated following the penultimate deliberation with Juste and Evgeniya advancing to the final two.)
1	Olga	Oksana	Kristine	Darya	Sofia	Masha	Tatyana	Olga	Evgeniya	Evgeniya	Evgeniya; Juste; Tatyana	Evgeniya
2	Elena	Evgeniya	Tatyana	Tatyana; Juste	Juste	Juste	Darya	Evgeniya	Masha	Masha	Evgeniya; Juste; Tatyana	Juste
3	Evgeniya	Sofia	Olga	Tatyana; Juste	Tatyana	Tatyana	Olga	Tatyana	Juste	Juste	Evgeniya; Juste; Tatyana	Tatyana
4	Alisa	Juste	Juste	Olga	Evgeniya	Evgeniya	Alisa	Juste	Tatyana	Tatyana	Masha	
5	Oksana	Elena	Masha	Sofia	Oksana	Oksana	Juste	Masha	Darya	Darya		
6	Kristine	Darya	Darya	Masha	Alisa	Olga	Evgeniya	Darya	Olga			
7	Sofia	Kristine	Sofia	Evgeniya	Masha	Darya	Masha	Alisa				
8	Juste	Alina	Alisa	Oksana	Olga	Alisa	Oksana					
9	Masha	Olga	Evgeniya	Kristine	Darya	Sofia						
10	Darya	Masha	Alina	Alina	Kristine							
11	Sasha	Tatyana	Oksana	Alisa								
12	Tatyana	Alisa	Elena									
13	Alina	Sasha										
14	Anastasiya											

The contestant was immune from elimination
The contestant was eliminated
The contestant quit the competition
The contestant was the original eliminee, but was saved
The contestant was eliminated outside of judging panel
The contestant won the competition
