= Katia Elizarova =

Russian model and actress

- Born: Ekaterina Igorevna Elizarova; 17 August 1986 (age 40); Saratov, Russian SFSR, Soviet Union
- Other name: Katya Elizarova
- Spouse: Blair Metcalfe (m. 2016)
- Children: 1
- Modelling information
- Height: 1.76 m (5 ft 9 1/2 in)
- Hair colour: Blonde
- Eye colour: Blue / Green

Ekaterina Igorevna "Katia" Elizarova (Russian: Екатерина Игоревна "Катя" Елизарова; born 17 August 1986) is a Russian model and actress.

== Early life ==
Elizarova was born in Saratov, Russian SFSR, Soviet Union. Her great-grandfather was the husband of Vladimir Lenin's sister, and her grandfather was a former head of the KGB. She has a sister, Alisa, who was a contestant on the fourth cycle of Top Model po-russki, the Russian edition of America's Next Top Model.

She attended ballet classes during childhood, with the ambition of dancing with the Bolshoi Ballet. Elizarova later studied law at Queen Mary University of London.

== Career ==
=== Modelling ===
At 14, Elizarova was spotted by a modelling scout in her hometown, after which she appeared on the cover of Jalouse and starred in Russian television commercials and campaigns for brands including Pepsi, Kirin, La Forêt and Sok Dobriy. She went on to appear in Elle and Glamour magazines, and to work with Versace, Valentino, and Preen.

Elizarova became a full-time model after graduating from university in 2009. Clients and photographers Elizarova has worked with include Ellen Von Unwerth, Rankin, Kim Knott, Comme des Garçons, Guy Laroche, Kirin, Laforet, Calvin Klein, Chanel, Valentino, Versace, Ines Valentinitsch, Etienne Aigner, Karen Walker, Preen, Jasper Conran, DSquared², Ghost, Avon, Shu Uemura, Swarovski, New Look, Miss Selfridge, Fornarina, Victoria's Secret, Made by Niki, Babyliss, Trevor Sorbie, L'Oréal, and Wella.

Elizarova has worked with several agencies, including Why Not Model Agency (Milan), City Models (Paris), M4 Models (Hamburg), View Management (Spain), Vivienne Model Management and Clear Model Management.

Campaigns since 2010 include Esprit, Triumph, GHD, Toni & Guy, and launching George Davies' luxury fashion brand GIVe. She has also appeared on the cover of Fabulous Magazine and S Magazine and had features in InStyle Magazine, Marie Claire, T3, GQ, Sky Showbiz.

In August 2011 she signed with IMG Models. In November, Elizarova was hired by US fashion company Max Studio as the brand's new face and first ambassador. Elizarova has fronted and creatively consulted on campaigns for Max Studio in its Spring/Summer 2012, Fall/Winter 2012 and Spring/Summer 2013 seasons supported by fellow brand models Erin O'Connor, Suki Waterhouse, and Victoria Zuban.

In 2015, Elizarova appeared with Sam Claflin fronting the On Arrival campaign for Ciroc and featuring in advertising shot by celebrated photographer Mario Testino.

=== Acting ===
In 2003, she appeared in the Russian music video Sky by Diskoteka Avariya.

Elizarova made her theatrical debut on the London stage in Belka Production's adaptation of Chekhov and Bunin short stories Sunstroke, in August/September 2013. She also appeared in Fox UK's reality show Meet the Russians, about Eastern Europeans living in London.

In 2015, Elizarova featured in the BBC2 documentary Rich, Russian and Living in London.

Elizarova made her film debut in spring 2016, in the film adaptation of John le Carré novel Our Kind of Traitor. In October 2016, Elizarova appeared in Bridget Jones's Baby as the ex-girlfriend of the character played by Hugh Grant.

=== Charity and social action ===
A campaigner for models' rights, in 2009 she addressed the Oxford Union on the world of modelling, its pitfalls, rewards and health issues. She is a supporter of UK charity Fashion For Good and the Red Cross. In October 2013, Elizarova addressed a forum in the British Parliament on the future of the fashion industry, focusing on support for young talent.

== Personal life ==
In September 2016, Elizarova married Blair Metcalfe, a businessman. The couple have been together since 2009, and have a daughter.
