= Lisovets =

Lisovets (Belarusian: Лісавец, Russian: Лисовец, Ukrainian: Лісовець) is a surname of Slavic-language origin. Notable people with this surname include:

- Volodymyr Lisovets (born 2004), Ukrainian swimmer
- Vlad Lisovets (born 1972), Russian stylist, hair stylist, designer and host
- Yevgeni Lisovets (born 1994), Belarusian ice hockey player
