= Magro =

Magro is a surname. Notable people with the surname include:

- Antonio Maria Magro (born 1959), Italian film director, actor and screenwriter
- Daniele Magro (born 1987), Italian basketball player
- Feliciano Magro (born 1979), Italian-Swiss footballer
- Marc Magro (born 1984), American football player
- Stan Magro (born 1954), Australian rules footballer
- Sylvester Carmel Magro (1941–2018), Maltese Roman Catholic bishop
- Ronnie Ortiz-Magro (born 1985), American television personality and actor
