= Top Model po-russki season 1 =

Top Model po-russki
- Season 1
- Judges: Ksenia Sobchak; Mikhail Korolev; Elena Suprun; Inna Zobova
- No. of contestants: 16
- Winner: Mariya Lesovaya
- No. of episodes: 16

Release
- Original network: Muz-TV
- Original release: April 3 – May 22, 2011

Season chronology
- Next → Season 2

Top Model po-russki season 1 was the first installment of the Russian adaptation of Tyra Banks' America's Next Top Model. The show aired on Muz-TV from April to May 2011. The competition was hosted by Ksenia Sobchak, who also served as the head judge. The judging panel was composed of model Inna Zobova, designer Elena Suprun and photographer Mikhail Korolev. Other cast members included creative director Maxim Rapoport. Cast members from the original version such as Janice Dickinson, Jay Manuel and Tyra Banks made guest appearances on the show. Filming and post production for this season took place in early 2011.

The prize package for this cycle included a fashion spread for Cosmopolitan magazine as well as a cover appearance in Cosmopolitan Beauty, a contract with Max Factor, and a contract with a modeling agency.

The winner of the competition was 21-year-old Mariya Lesovaya from Yekaterinburg.

== Cast ==
=== Contestants ===
(Ages stated are at start of contest)

Contestant	Age	Height	Hometown	Finish	Place
Ekaterina 'Katya' Nikulina	26	172 cm (5 ft 7 1/2 in)	Saint Petersburg	Episode 2	17
Yelena Domashnyaya † (Note: Domashnyaya was one of 217 passengers killed in the crash of Metrojet Flight 9268 in October 2015)	20	172 cm (5 ft 7 1/2 in)	Saint Petersburg	Episode 3	16
Alyona Prokopova	19	174 cm (5 ft 8 1/2 in)	Kursk	Episode 4	15 (quit)
Karmela Amadio	19	175 cm (5 ft 9 in)	Nalchik	Episode 5	14
Kseniya Dmitriyeva	24	173.5 cm (5 ft 8 1/2 in)	Moscow	Episode 5	13
Valeriya Chertok	24	175 cm (5 ft 9 in)	Norilsk	Episode 6	12
Kseniya Viktorova	19	180 cm (5 ft 11 in)	Kazan	Episode 7	11
Arina Perchik	20	177 cm (5 ft 9 1/2 in)	Tolyatti	Episode 8	10
Anastasiya Zharinova	18	173 cm (5 ft 8 in)	Oktyabrsky	Episode 9	9
Elizaveta 'Liza' Ramuravelu	23	179 cm (5 ft 10 1/2 in)	Moscow	Episode 9	8
Kseniya Timofeyeva (Note: Kseniya and Olga Timofeyeva are identical twins; however, they competed individually.)	18	174.5 cm (5 ft 8 1/2 in)	Saint Petersburg	Episode 11	7
Evgeniya Timakova	22	174 cm (5 ft 8 1/2 in)	Samara	Episode 12	6
Olga Timofeyeva	18	174 cm (5 ft 8 1/2 in)	Saint Petersburg	Episode 13	5
Maria 'Masha' Minogarova	21	182 cm (5 ft 11 1/2 in)	Krasnodar	Episode 14	4
Evgeniya Frank	22	180 cm (5 ft 11 in)	Shchuchinsk, Kazakhstan	Episode 16	3
Irina Adadurova	23	178 cm (5 ft 10 in)	Bryansk	Episode 16	2
Mariya Lesovaya	21	178 cm (5 ft 10 in)	Yekaterinburg	Episode 16	1

=== Judges ===
- Ksenia Sobchak (host)
- Mikhail Korolev
- Elena Suprun
- Inna Zobova

== Episodes ==
No. overall	No. in season	Title	Original release date
1	1	"Episode 1"	3 April 2011
Special guests: Vladimir Kalinchev
2	2	"Episode 2"	3 April 2011
Special guests: Oksana Yashankina, Irina Andryushkina
3	3	"Episode 3"	10 April 2011
Special guests: Danil Kosenkov
4	4	"Episode 4"	10 April 2011
Special guests: Vladimir Kalinchev
5	5	"Episode 5"	17 April 2011
Featured photographer: Igor Vasiliadis; Special guests: Lyasan Utiasheva & Evgeny Papunaishvili
6	6	"Episode 6"	17 April 2011
Featured photographer: Igor Vasiliadis; Special guests: Janice Dickinson
7	7	"Episode 7"	24 April 2011
Featured photographer: Igor Vasiliadis; Special guests: Alya Badanina
8	8	"Episode 8"	24 April 2011
Featured photographer: Mikhail Kharlamov; Special guests: Daniel Kosenkov
9	9	"Episode 9"	2 May 2011
Featured photographer: Natalia Arefyeva
10	10	"Episode 10"	2 May 2011
11	11	"Episode 11"	9 May 2011
Featured photographer: Mikhail Korolev; Special guests: Vadim Medvedev
12	12	"Episode 12"	9 May 2011
Featured photographer: Mikhail Korolev; Special guests: Vladimir Kalinichev
13	13	"Episode 13"	15 May 2011
Featured photographer: Michael Keal; Special guests: Kristin Inderson, Angel Sanchez, Maksim Rapoport
14	14	"Episode 14"	15 May 2011
Featured photographer: Michael Keal; Special guests: Jay Manuel, Angel Sanchez, Anna Rykova
15	15	"Episode 15"	22 May 2011
16	16	"Episode 16"	22 May 2011
Special guests: Anna Rykova, Maksim Rapaport, Roman Yang

== Results ==
Order	Episodes														
Order	1	2	3	4 (Note: In episode 4, Alyona and Olga landed in the bottom two. Earlier in the episode Alyona had refused to cut her hair for the makeovers. While in the bottom two, host Ksenia Sobchak pulled out a pair of shears and Olga's photograph from the photo shoot, and presented Alyona with one of two options: she could pick the shears and accept the makeover to stay in the competition, resulting in Olga's elimination, or she could choose Olga's photo and leave. She chose the latter.)	5	6	7	8	9	11	12	13	14	16	
1	Karmela	Kseniya T.	Liza	Kseniya T.	Kseniya V.	Irina	Anastasiya	Kseniya T.	Mariya	Evgeniya T.	Evgeniya F.	Evgeniya F.	Mariya	Irina	Mariya
2	Alyona	Anastasiya	Karmela	Kseniya V.	Kseniya T.	Kseniya T.	Mariya	Olga	Olga	Evgeniya F.	Olga	Irina	Irina	Mariya	Irina
3	Masha	Karmela	Masha	Mariya	Liza	Olga	Olga	Evgeniya T.	Evgeniya F.	Mariya	Irina	Mariya	Evgeniya F.	Evgeniya F.	
4	Kseniya V.	Evgeniya F.	Arina	Kseniya D.	Evgeniya T.	Mariya	Masha	Liza	Irina	Masha	Mariya	Masha	Masha		
5	Kseniya D.	Alyona	Evgeniya F.	Masha	Arina	Evgeniya T.	Liza	Anastasiya	Kseniya T.	Irina	Masha	Olga			
6	Arina	Evgeniya T.	Kseniya V.	Valeriya	Evgeniya F.	Anastasiya	Arina	Evgeniya F.	Masha	Olga	Evgeniya T.				
7	Valeriya	Kseniya D.	Kseniya T.	Arina	Masha	Evgeniya F.	Evgeniya T.	Irina	Evgeniya T.	Kseniya T.					
8	Evgeniya F.	Irina	Alyona	Evgeniya T.	Olga	Arina	Evgeniya F.	Mariya	Liza						
9	Yelena	Arina	Evgeniya T.	Anastasiya	Irina	Kseniya V.	Irina	Masha	Anastasiya						
10	Irina	Olga	Valeriya	Evgeniya F.	Anastasiya	Masha	Kseniya T.	Arina							
11	Olga	Masha	Anastasiya	Liza	Valeriya	Liza	Kseniya V.								
12	Evgeniya T.	Mariya	Mariya	Irina	Mariya	Valeriya									
13	Katya	Valeriya	Irina	Karmela	Kseniya D.										
14	Liza	Kseniya V.	Olga	Alyona	Karmela										
15	Anastasiya	Liza	Kseniya D.	Olga											
16	Kseniya T.	Yelena	Yelena												
17	Mariya	Katya													

The contestant was eliminated.
The contestant quit the competition.
The contestant was the original eliminee, but was saved.
The contestant was eliminated outside of judging panel.
The contestant won the competition performance.
