= Maja Latinović =

Serbian model (born 1980)

- Born: June 25, 1980 (age 45); Banatsko Veliko Selo, Kikinda, SR Serbia, SFR Yugoslavia
- Occupation: Model

Maja Latinović (Serbian Cyrillic: Маја Латиновић; born June 25, 1980) is a Serbian model, considered to be one of the greatest Serbian supermodels.

== Career ==
At 16, Latinović's modeling career began accidentally when her sister entered her into a local modeling contest. She placed 2nd runner-up and a model scout soon asked her to fly to Milan.

At the age of nineteen, Latinović began working with the Women Management agency in New York City. Mario Testino hand-picked Latinović to be the face of the Roberto Cavalli campaign and after working with her the first time, continued to shoot her for Italian Vogue.

Latinović has worked for many clients, such as Italian, French, German, Japanese, British, Spanish Vogue, W magazine, Harper's Bazaar, and Numéro. She has walked for major designers including: Ralph Lauren, Versace, Dolce & Gabbana, Carolina Herrera, Donna Karan, Chanel, Oscar de la Renta, Bill Blass, Cavalli, Ferré, and Michael Kors. She has been featured in campaigns for BCBG, Valentino Roma, Donna Karan, Roberto Cavalli, Chanel, Oscar de la Renta, Miss Sixty, Gap and Wonderbra.
