= Top Model po-russki season 2 =

Top Model po-russki
- Season 2
- Judges: Ksenia Sobchak; Vlad Lisovets; Danila Polyakov; Inna Zobova
- No. of contestants: 14
- Winner: Katya Bagrova
- No. of episodes: 14

Release
- Original network: Muz-TV
- Original release: September 25 – November 6, 2011

Season chronology
- ← Previous; Season 1 Next → Season 3

Top Model po-russki season 2 was the second installment of the Russian adaptation of Tyra Banks America's Next Top Model. The show began airing on Muz-TV from September to November 2011. Host Ksenia Sobchak and Inna Zobova returned as judges, but Elena Suprun and Mikhail Korolev were replaced by stylist, fashion designer and TV presenter Vlad Lisovets, and male model Danila Polyakov. Filming for this season took place over the summer of 2011.

The prize package for this cycle included a fashion spread in Cosmopolitan magazine as well as a cover appearance in Cosmopolitan Shopping, a contract with Max Factor, and a contract with a modeling agency.

The winner of the competition was 18-year-old Katya Bagrova from Nizhny Novgorod.

== Cast ==
=== Contestants ===
(Ages stated are at start of contest)

Contestant	Age	Height	Hometown	Finish	Place
Arnela Butuyeva	18	180 cm (5 ft 11 in)	Moscow	Episode 2	14
Elizaveta 'Liza' Oleshko	18	178 cm (5 ft 10 in)	Saint Petersburg	Episode 3	13
Anzhelika Yakuseva	20	174 cm (5 ft 8 1/2 in)	Ufa	Episode 4	12
Svetlana 'Sveta' Babiy	22	173 cm (5 ft 8 in)	Tolyatti	Episode 5	11
Anastasiya Belkina	20	184 cm (6 ft 1/2 in)	Krasnodar	Episode 6	10
Margarita 'Margo' Lukina	18	170 cm (5 ft 7 in)	Novosibirsk	Episode 6	9
Vera Butakova	22	170 cm (5 ft 7 in)	Samara	Episode 7	8 (quit)
Anzhelika Tikhonenko	19	178 cm (5 ft 10 in)	Irkutsk	Episode 8	7
Dobromira Nepomnyashchaya	20	174 cm (5 ft 8 1/2 in)	Krasnoyarsk	Episode 10	6
Ekaterina 'Katya' Streltsova	22	180 cm (5 ft 11 in)	Moscow	Episode 11	5
Alina Fedulova	21	175 cm (5 ft 9 in)	Nizhny Novgorod	Episode 12	4
Olga Ponomar	21	177 cm (5 ft 9 1/2 in)	Stavropol	Episode 13	3
Yulya Vlasenko	20	180 cm (5 ft 11 in)	Saint Petersburg	Episode 14	2
Ekaterina 'Katya' Bagrova	18	178 cm (5 ft 10 in)	Nizhny Novgorod	Episode 14	1

=== Judges ===
- Ksenia Sobchak (host)
- Vlad Lisovets
- Danila Polyakov
- Inna Zobova

== Episodes ==
No. overall	No. in season	Title	Original release date
17	1	"Episode 1"	25 September 2011
The semifinalists convened at a riverside port, where they boarded a ferry and got to know each other. The party was cut short when a raid of pirates took the contestants back to shore, where they met host Ksenia Sobchak along with fellow judges Vlad Lisovets and Danila Polyakov. After a runway show in front of the judges, the models moved into their hotel for the duration of casting week, and the first round of eliminations took place. They later had one on one interviews along with a pirate themed photo shoot session in black and white, photographed by judge Inna Zobova. At the end of the week, the judges selected the final cast.: Featured photographer: Inna Zobova
18	2	"Episode 2"	25 September 2011
The final fourteen moved into their new penthouse apartment. They received a visit from judges Danila and Inna, who coached them on their runway walks in preparation for their first challenge: a runway show on an unstable catwalk over a pool of water, which was won by Anzhelika Y. For the weekly photo shoot, the models had to pose on the beach in a campaign for Venus razors. Back at the house the models received another visit from Inna. This time she was accompanied by Otto Kilian Bijou for a styling challenge, which was also won by Anzhelika Y. Arnela and Liza landed in the bottom two after deliberations at panel, and Arnela was eliminated from the competition.: Featured photographer: Natalie Arefyeva; Special guests: Daniel Kosenkov, Otto Kilian Bijou
19	3	"Episode 3"	2 October 2011
The models received makeovers. They later met make up artists Vladimir Kalinchev and Nina Jorjadze for a makeup lesson and challenge to make the most out of their new looks, where Anzhelika T. was chosen as the winner. For the photo shoot, the contestants had their portraits taken in a bold makeup campaign for Max Factor whilst wearing a diamond necklace. At panel, Liza and Yulia landed in the bottom two, and Liza was eliminated from the competition.: Featured photographer: Enisey Abramov; Special guests: Vladimir Kalinchev, Nina Jorjadze
20	4	"Episode 4"	2 October 2011
The contestants arrived at a dance school and received a lesson on body movement from choreographer Eugene Papunaishvili. They later had to put their newfound knowledge to the test in a laser challenge, won by Olga, where the goal was to traverse a room full of laser beams without touching them. For the weekly photo shoot, the models had to pose alongside judge Danila Polyakov in a romantic session where they had to portray angels fallen to earth. At deliberation, Anzhelika Y. and Vera landed in the bottom two, and Anzhelika Y. was eliminated from the competition.: Featured photographer: Alikhan; Special guests: Evgeniy Papunaishvili
21	5	"Episode 5"	9 October 2011
The remaining eleven contestants received a lesson on the importance of thoroughly reading though a contract, and later received a pep talk visit from TV personality and presenter Andrey Malakhov. For the photo shoot, the models had to portray an array of carnival and circus oddities. Tensions ensued back at the house over the allocation of cleaning duties. At panel, Alina and Sveta landed in the bottom two, and Sveta was eliminated from the competition.: Featured photographer: Alexey Nikishin; Special guests: Andrey Malakhov
22	6	"Episode 6"	9 October 2011
The contestants began their week by meeting actress Anastasia Zavorotnyuk for an outdoor acting lesson in preparation for their upcoming challenge. They later had to don a coat of body paint while they posed as live statues in a street performance for passersby whilst competing for tips. Katya S. was selected by the crowd as the winner, while Anastasiya's poor performance saw her leave the competition early. At the photo shoot, the models were photographed as living dolls by none other than Nigel Barker. Margo and Vera found themselves in the bottom two after deliberations, and Margo was eliminated from the competition.: Featured photographer: Nigel Barker; Special guest: Anastasia Zavorotnyuk
23	7	"Episode 7"	16 October 2011
The remaining contestants were put through their paces for a runway lesson at a local bowling alley, where Vera and judge Inna Zobova got into a heated spat over her critiques. The models later took part in a runway show wearing designs by Masha Tsigal. Katya B. was deemed the best overall, and won an invitation to Volvo Fashion Week in Moscow. For this week's photo shoot, each model had to portray a character from the 2002 musical film 8 femmes. Dobromira and Vera found themselves in the bottom two after deliberations at panel. In a shocking turn of events, Vera decided to quit the competition and Dobromira was allowed to stay.: Featured photographer: Alexey Yakovlev; Special guests: Masha Tsigal
24	8	"Episode 8"	16 October 2011
For having shown the most improvement on her walk during the episode's prior runway show, Alina was treated to a night out shopping with Dobromira and Katya S., and the three were introduced to model Natasha Poly by host Ksenia Sobchak. The following morning, the models had a posing and photograph teach with judge Inna Zobova. They later had a timed challenge at a nearby shopping center where the goal was to impress Cosmopolitan editor Alya Badanina whilst they rode an elevator with her. Dobromira made the best impression, and was chosen as the challenge winner. For the weekly photo shoot, the models had to pose on the red carpet as they were photographed by the paparazzi. Back at the house it was revealed that the remaining six contestants would be travelling to London. Anzhelika T. and Katya landed in the bottom two after deliberations at panel, and Anzhelika was eliminated from the competition.: Featured photographer: Dmitry Pirozhnikov; Special guests: Alya Badanina, Natasha Poly
25	9	"Episode 9"	23 October 2011
Having reached the halfway point of the competition, the show went over the highs and lows of the season thus far, and followed each models journey and development as they prepared for their trip to London the following week.
26	10	"Episode 10"	23 October 2011
The final six checked in their luggage at Moscow's Domodedovo Airport and boarded their flight to London, where they were welcomed by judge Inna Zobova before moving into their new apartment. They later boarded a double-decker bus and were treated to a sight-seeing tour of some of the city's most iconic landmarks. The following day they met judge Vlad Lisovets and were introduced to Sophie Ellis-Bextor for a timed shopping and styling challenge, which was won by Katya S. She was treated to high tea at an upscale cafe, which she chose to share with Dobromira. For the photo shoot, the models were taken to the countryside and fitted with designer wedding gowns individually styled by fashion director Jenny Swire. Dobromira and Katya B. landed in the bottom two after deliberations at panel, and Dobromira was eliminated from the competition.: Featured photographer: Phys Frampton; Special guests: Sophie Ellis-Bextor, Jenny Swire
27	11	"Episode 11"	30 October 2011
Featured photographer: Rita; Special guests: Sasha Boyer
28	12	"Episode 12"	30 October 2011
Featured photographer: Joseph Sinclair; Special guests: Prince Cassius
29	13	"Episode 13"	6 November 2011
Special guests: Vladimir Kalinchev
30	14	"Episode 14"	6 November 2011
Featured photographer: Clara Maidment; Special guests: Alya Badanina

== Results ==
Order	Episodes												
Order	1 (Note: Episode 1 was the casting episode.)	2	3	4	5	6 (Note: In episode 6, Anastasiya was eliminated outside of judging panel.)	7 (Note: In episode 7, Dobromira was originally eliminated when she landed in the bottom two with Vera, but was saved due to Vera's decision to quit.)	8	10	11	12	13 (Note: In episode 13, there was no call-out. Olga was eliminated immediately after the final three deliberation, while Katya and Yulya advanced to the final two.)	14
1	Dobromira	Sveta	Katya S.	Katya S.	Katya B.	Katya B.	Olga	Alina	Yulya	Olga	Katya B.	Katya B. Yulya	Katya B.
2	Liza	Alina	Dobromira	Alina	Anastasiya	Olga	Alina	Olga	Katya S.	Yulya	Olga	Katya B. Yulya	Yulya
3	Katya S.	Anzhelika Y.	Anzhelika T.	Olga	Vera	Yulya	Katya S.	Dobromira	Olga	Katya B.	Yulya	Olga	
4	Yulya	Katya S.	Katya B.	Yulya	Yulya	Katya S.	Katya B.	Yulya	Alina	Alina	Alina		
5	Vera	Yulya	Alina	Katya B.	Anzhelika T.	Anzhelika T.	Anzhelika T.	Katya S.	Katya B.	Katya S.			
6	Olga	Dobromira	Sveta	Anastasiya	Margo	Alina	Yulya	Katya B.	Dobromira				
7	Anzhelika Y.	Olga	Vera	Dobromira	Olga	Dobromira	Vera	Anzhelika T.					
8	Arnela	Margo	Anastasiya	Sveta	Dobromira	Vera	Dobromira						
9	Sveta	Vera	Margo	Anzhelika T.	Katya S.	Margo							
10	Alina	Katya B.	Olga	Margo	Alina	Anastasiya							
11	Anzhelika T.	Anastasiya	Anzhelika Y.	Vera	Sveta								
12	Katya B.	Anzhelika T.	Yulya	Anzhelika Y.									
13	Anastasiya	Liza	Liza										
14	Margo	Arnela											

The contestant was eliminated
The contestant was eliminated outside of judging panel
The contestant quit the competition
The contestant was the original eliminee but was saved
The contestant was put through collectively to the next round
The contestant won the competition
