= Top Model po-russki season 3 =

Top Model po-russki
- Season 3
- Judges: Ksenia Sobchak; Vlad Lisovets; Danila Polyakov; Inna Zobova
- No. of contestants: 14
- Winner: Tatyana Kozuto
- No. of episodes: 12

Release
- Original network: Muz-TV
- Original release: March 25 – May 27, 2012

Season chronology
- ← Previous; Season 2 Next → Season 4

Top Model po-russki season 3 was the third installment of the Russian adaptation of Tyra Banks' America's Next Top Model. The show aired on Muz-TV from March to May 2012 and featured a cast of fourteen new contestants. All panel members of the previous cycle remained in place. Filming for this season took place in early 2012.

The prize package for this cycle grew slightly, and included a fashion spread in Cosmopolitan magazine as well as a cover appearance in Cosmopolitan Beauty, a trip to a spa resort in Slovenia courtesy of Orsoten Slim, a brand new Ford Fiesta, and a one-year modeling contract with Wilhelmina Models.

The winner of the competition was 20-year-old Tatyana Kozuto from Yoshkar-Ola.

== Cast ==
=== Contestants ===
(Ages stated are at start of contest)

Contestant	Age	Height	Hometown	Finish	Place
Vera Sapozhnikova	21	179 cm (5 ft 10 1/2 in)	Moscow	Episode 2	14
Evgeniya Vasilyeva	18	183 cm (6 ft 0 in)	Ufa	Episode 3	13
Irina 'Ira' Koroleva	22	172 cm (5 ft 7 1/2 in)	Voronezh	Episode 4	12
Yana Kondratyeva	23	181 cm (5 ft 11 1/2 in)	Moscow	Episode 5	11–10
Valeriya Ivanova	19	175 cm (5 ft 9 in)	Azov	Episode 5	11–10
Anastasiya Savenkova	18	171.5 cm (5 ft 7 1/2 in)	Novomoskovsk	Episode 6	9
Natalya Pampukha	25	173 cm (5 ft 8 in)	Saint Petersburg	Episode 7	8
Dinara Elgaytarova	26	173 cm (5 ft 8 in)	Moscow	Episode 8	7
Evgeniya Shagdarova	21	172 cm (5 ft 7 1/2 in)	Ulan-Ude	Episode 9	6
Lidia Marycheva	22	178 cm (5 ft 10 in)	Apatity	Episode 10	5
Darya Korniyenko	25	180 cm (5 ft 11 in)	Petropavlovsk-Kamchatsky	Episode 11	4
Lilya Kotsur	19	176 cm (5 ft 9 1/2 in)	Novokuznetsk	Episode 12	3
Anna Afanasyeva	18	175 cm (5 ft 9 in)	Chelyabinsk	Episode 12	2
Tatyana Kozuto	20	178 cm (5 ft 10 in)	Yoshkar-Ola	Episode 12	1

=== Judges ===
- Ksenia Sobchak (host)
- Vlad Lisovets
- Danila Polyakov
- Inna Zobova

== Episodes ==
No. overall	No. in season	Title	Original release date
31	1	"Episode 1"	25 March 2012
32	2	"Episode 2"	1 April 2012
Featured photographer: Dmitry Iskhakov
33	3	"Episode 3"	8 April 2012
Featured photographer: Vladimir Timchuk
34	4	"Episode 4"	8 April 2012
Featured photographer: Ali Khan
35	5	"Episode 5"	15 April 2012
Featured photographer: Nigel Barker
36	6	"Episode 6"	22 April 2012
Featured photographer: Ali Khan
37	7	"Episode 7"	22 April 2012
Featured photographer: Danila Velichko
38	8	"Episode 8"	30 April 2012
Featured photographer: Ekaterina Rozhdestvenskaya
39	9	"Episode 9"	7 May 2012
Featured photographer: Victor Sanabrais
40	10	"Episode 10"	13 May 2012
41	11	"Episode 11"	20 May 2012
42	12	"Episode 12"	27 May 2012
Special guests: Roman Young, Tyra Banks

== Results ==
Order	Episodes										
Order	2 (Note: In episode 1, there was no actual call-out, as Ksenia only called the names of the semi-finalists that were being eliminated.)	3	4	5 (Note: In episode 5, Valeria and Yana were both eliminated while in the bottom two.)	6	7	8	9	10	11	12 (Note: Lilya was eliminated immediately after the deliberation that took place prior to the final runway. Only Anna and Tatyana were present at the final judging.)
1	Lidia	Lilya	Anna	Darya	Natalya	Tatyana	Anna	Darya	Tatyana	Tatyana	Tatyana
2	Lilya	Dinara	Valeriya	Tatyana	Darya	Lidia	Lidia	Anna	Darya	Anna	Anna
3	Tatyana	Anna	Evgeniya S.	Anastasiya	Tatyana	Evgeniya S.	Tatyana	Tatyana	Lilya	Lilya	Lilya
4	Dinara	Lidia	Dinara	Anna	Lilya	Anna	Darya	Lilya	Anna	Darya	
5	Anna	Tatyana	Natalya	Lidia	Lidia	Dinara	Evgeniya S.	Lidia	Lidia		
6	Evgeniya S.	Darya	Anastasiya	Lilya	Anna	Darya	Lilya	Evgeniya S.			
7	Anastasiya	Valeriya	Tatyana	Evgeniya S.	Evgeniya S.	Lilya	Dinara				
8	Darya	Anastasiya	Yana	Natalya	Dinara	Natalya					
9	Evgeniya V.	Evgeniya S.	Lidia	Dinara	Anastasiya						
10	Ira	Ira	Darya	Valeriya; Yana							
11	Yana	Yana	Lilya	Valeriya; Yana							
12	Natalya	Natalya	Ira								
13	Valeriya	Evgeniya V.									
14	Vera										

The contestant was eliminated
The contestant won the competition
