= Maria Minogarova =

Russian actress, model and TV presenter

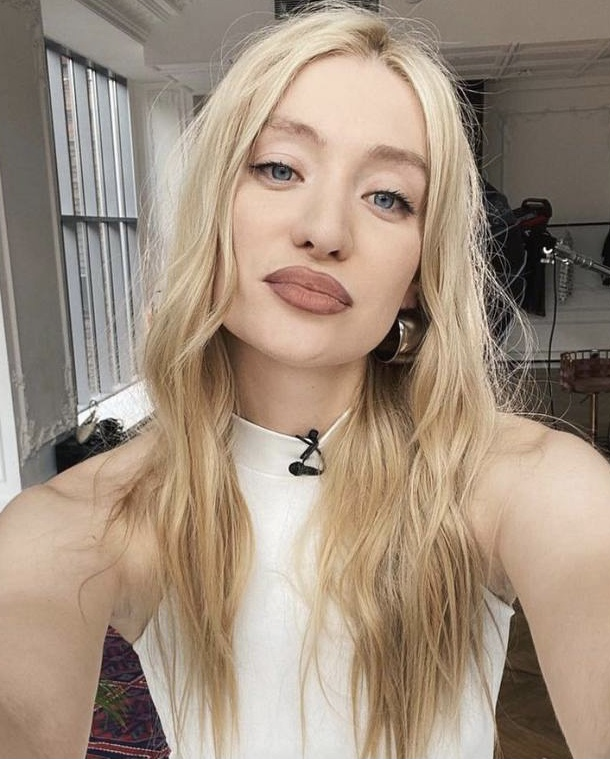
- Maria in 2017
- Born: Maria Albertovna Minogarova; 15 March 1989 (age 37); Krasnodar, Russia
- Education: Kuban State University
- Occupations: blogger; model; TV presenter
- Years active: 2006-present
- Height: 1.85 m (6 ft 1 in)
- Partner: Pavel Alekseyev

Maria Albertovna Minogarova (Russian: Мария Альбертовна Миногаровa, born 15 March 1989, Krasnodar, RSFSR), also known as Masha, is a Russian model, blogger, YouTuber and TV presenter.

== Early life ==
Maria was born in the city of Krasnodar in 1989.

== Career ==
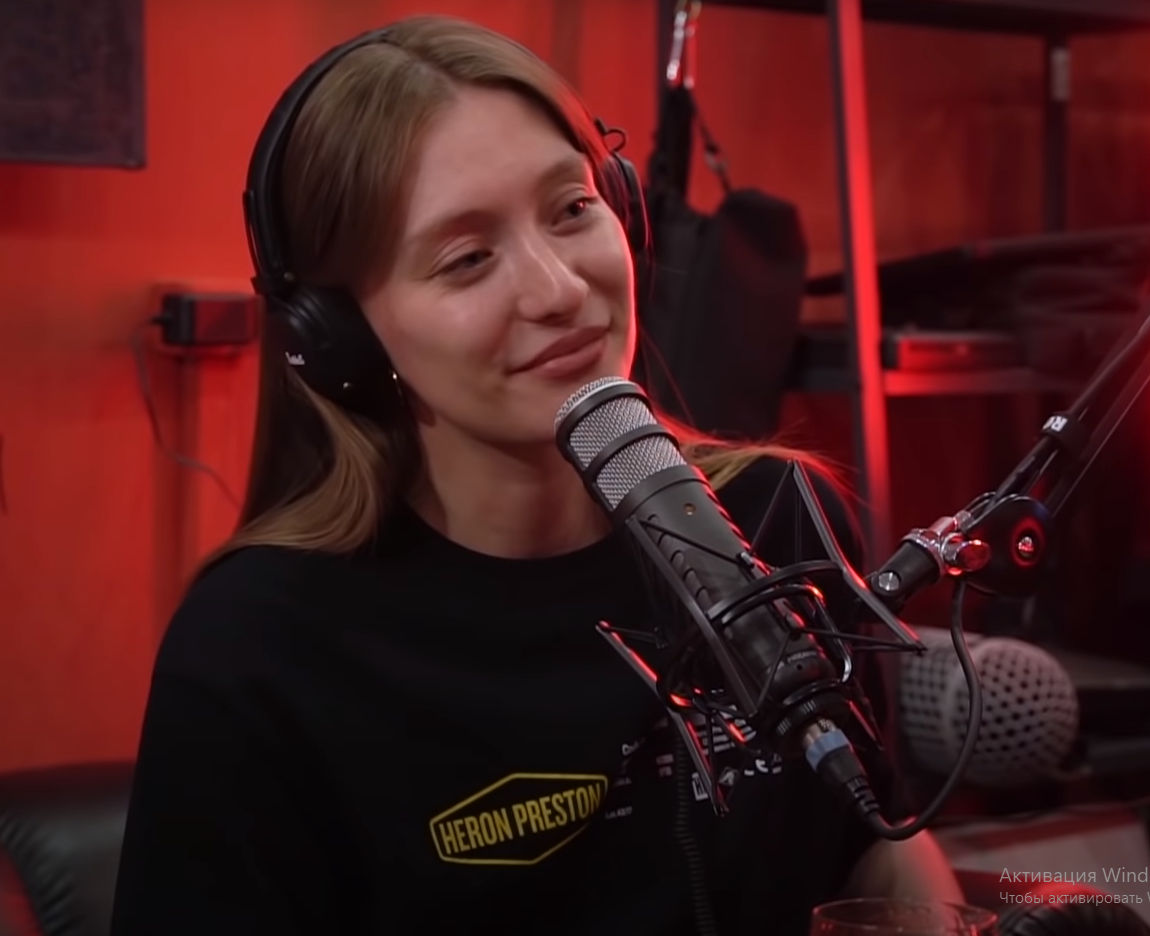
Maria in 2019.

In 2011, she took part in the first season of Top Model po-russki under her nickname Masha, where she came in fourth place. After the show, she worked as a model in Milan.

In 2018, she took part in an episode of the travel show Oryol i Reshka, where, together with Zhanna Badoeva, they visited Kaliningrad. The season was devoted to the cities of Russia. Maria showed how people could relax in Kaliningrad with only US$100. She co-hosted the second season with Maria Gorban.

Also in 2018, she became the presenter of the Russian version of the show Project Runway, which is broadcast on the TV channel Friday!.

In April 2018, Maria became the ideological inspiration of many Russian-speaking girls whose height is 180 cm and above, she is 185 cm tall. Maria headed the social project I Am Above This, for which in November 2018 received the "Case of the Year" award on the "Glamour. Woman Of The Year".

In March 2019, she released the film Track on her YouTube Channel.

In January 2020, the comedy film Marathon of Desires was published with Agela Tarasova, Kirill Nagiyev and Maria in the lead roles. Dasha Charusus wrote the script with Alexander Gudkov, who was also the director.

== Personal life ==
Maria lives in Moscow.

== Social media ==
Maria's Instagram has more than 1.2 million followers, over 4,550 posts and apparently follows a thousand users.
