= Denis Simachev =

Russian fashion designer (born 1974)

- Born: 12 June 1974 (age 51); Moscow, RSFSR, Soviet Union
- Label: Denis Simachev
- Website: denissimachev.ru

Denis Nikolaevich Simachev (Russian: Дени́с Никола́евич Симачёв; June 12, 1974, Moscow, USSR) is a Russian fashion designer and TV presenter. Winner of Russian and international competitions in the field of fashion.

== Biography ==
Denis Simachev was born on June 12, 1974, in Moscow, into a military family. Since 1988, he studied at the College of Art and Graphic Design in Moscow. In 1991, Denis entered the Pivot Point Academy in Spain. Since 1994 to 1995, he studied at the Yuri Grymov Studio, where he received a diploma in advertising. In parallel, in 1994, Simachev entered the Moscow State Textile Academy, which he graduated in 1999 and received a diploma in the design of clothing and footwear.

In 1999, Denis received his first awards as a fashion designer. He gets the first one at the international shoe exhibition MosShoes, and enters the finals of the Smirnoff International Fashion Awards in Hong Kong.

In 2001, Denis opened his own Denis Simachev Company, and in 2002 the first show of the collection was held as part of Fashion Week Pret-a-porter.

On April 17, 2007, as a co-owner, Denis Simachev shop / bar opened in Moscow.

In 2007, Denis collaborates with sports companies (in particular, Atom Racing) and participates in the development of design for the Atom DSS snowboard.

Denis Simachev for some time was co-host of the Channel One Russia programs in the City Slickers and the Fashionable Sentence. The judge of the project Top Model po-russki.

Denis's collections are shown annually at Milan Fashion Week. The designer focuses on Soviet symbolism and Russian national motifs.

In 2006, GQ Russia Magazine noted Denis Simachev as the Best Designer of the Year.
