= Kate Grigorieva =

Russian model (born 1988)

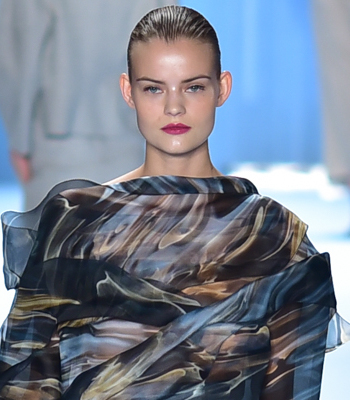
- Grigorieva in 2015
- Born: Yekaterina Sergeyevna Grigoryeva; 15 September 1988 (age 37); Olenegorsk, Murmansk Oblast, Russian SFSR, Soviet Union
- Occupation: Model
- Years active: 2014–present
- Spouse: Alexander (m. 2015; div. 2016) Anton Shunin (m. 2018)
- Children: 2
- Modeling information
- Height: 5 ft 11 in (1.80 m)
- Hair color: Dark Blonde
- Eye color: Green/Blue
- Agency: Monster Management (Milan)

Yekaterina Sergeyevna Grigoryeva (Russian: Екатерина Сергеевна Григорьева; born 15 September 1988), known professionally as Kate Grigorieva, is a Russian model. She was a Victoria's Secret Angel from 2015 to 2016.

== Early life ==
Grigoryeva was born in Olenegorsk to a military family.

== Career ==
Grigorieva took part in Miss Russia 2010 casting, but did not qualify as a contestant. Two years later, she participated in Miss Russia 2012, where she represented Murmansk Oblast and placed among the top 10 finalists. Later in 2012, she applied for the fourth cycle of Top Model po-russki, the Russian adaptation of America's Next Top Model, along with her sister Valentina, where she was runner-up to Yulia Farkhutdinova, with her sister placing third. She was soon signed to modeling agency ZMGROUP. After her appearance in Top Model po-russki, modeling agency The Lions displayed interest in signing her. This eventually led to Grigorieva's stage debut at New York Fashion Week in 2014, opening for Donna Karan as a semi-exclusive, as well as walking for Shiatzy Chen, Oscar de la Renta, Tory Burch and Ralph Lauren. She was chosen by top modeling site models.com as one of the top newcomers of the Fall/Winter 2014 season, and has since walked for Givenchy, Versace, Gucci, Dolce & Gabbana, Céline, Isabel Marant, Nina Ricci, Elie Saab, Roberto Cavalli, Alexander McQueen, Balmain, Giambattista Valli, Emanuel Ungaro, Moschino, Etro, Missoni, Emilio Pucci and others. She opened for the 2015 Spring/Summer collections of DSquared^{2} and Stella McCartney. She has shot ad campaigns for M Missoni, H&M, Moncler Gamme Rouge shot by Steven Meisel and Versace eyewear. She has appeared in catalogs for Victoria's Secret, and has also been featured in editorials of numerous magazines including several national editions of Vogue, Contributor, i-D, Pop and Numéro.

On 2 December 2014, Grigorieva made her debut at the Victoria's Secret Fashion Show 2014 along with fellow Miss Russia contestant and model, Irina Sharipova. In April 2015, she was announced as one of ten new Victoria's Secret Angels. In July 2015, she appeared in the Victoria's Secret TV commercial Body by Victoria.

In October 2015, Grigorieva was ranked by Cosmopolitan as one of the most successful contestants of the Top Model franchise.

She was supposed to walk in the 2017 Victoria's Secret Fashion Show, but days before the show, her visa to travel to China was rejected, along with several models, which prevented her from walking the show.

== Personal life ==
In August 2015, Grigorieva married her boyfriend Alexander in Saint Petersburg. In 2016, it was announced Alexander had filed for divorce from Grigorieva. In July 2018, Grigorieva married Anton Shunin, the goalkeeper and captain of Dynamo Moscow. Their daughter Sofia was born on 22 May 2020.
