= Patrizia Deitos =

Italian model

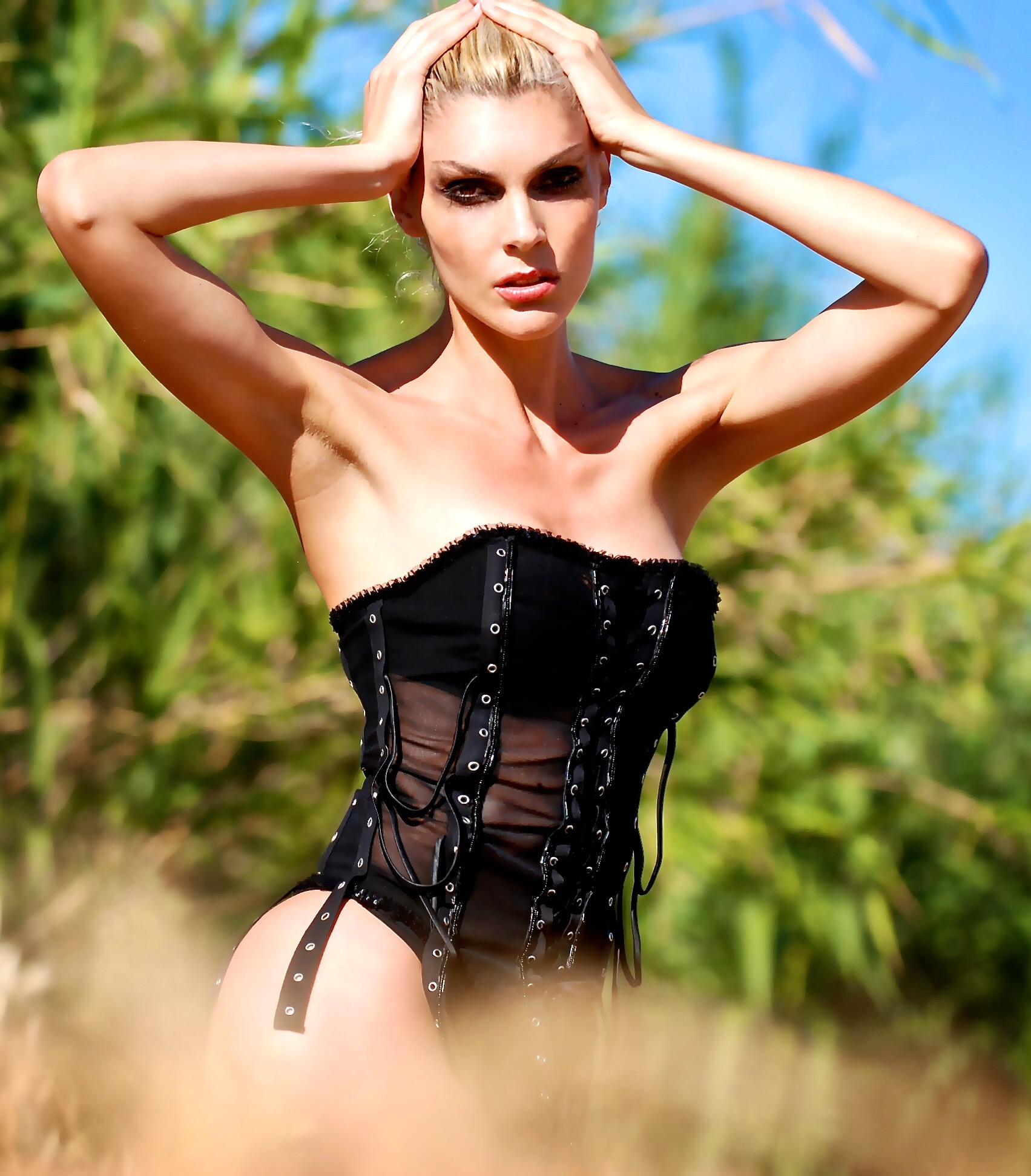
- Patrizia Deitos
- Born: 11 May 1975 (age 51); Rimini, Emilia-Romagna, Italy
- Occupations: Model, singer
- Years active: Model (1992-2010); Singer (1994–present)
- Modeling information
- Height: 6 ft (1.82 m)
- Hair color: Blond
- Eye color: Brown

Patrizia Deitos (born 11 May 1975 in Rimini, Emilia-Romagna, Italy) is an Italian model.

== Career ==
Patrizia Deitos is a former supermodel from Rimini, Italy, who has walked on some of the most renowned international catwalks. Her campaigns include Krizia, Ferré, Missoni, Mila Schon, Raffaella Curiel, La Perla, Parah. Giovanni Cabassi photographed Deitos for Harley-Davidson campaign. She has also appeared in 1996's campaign for Wonderbra. Her entrance into the world of modelling was not only due to her (182 cm) height, but to the lucky coincidence of being at The Embassy club in Rimini, where, at 17, she was invited to participate in the Miss Cinema Contest, which she won. This would have allowed her to take part in the Miss Italia Contest, but, because of her reserved character, she renounced. She was eventually persuaded to participate in the Miss Romagna Contest which she won and which lead her among the contestants for the final of Miss Italia: she achieved third place and won the Miss Smile International Contest. Despite this, Patrizia went on to finish the last two years of high school and obtained her diploma, accepting only photo shoots. For a period she alternated studies and fashion shows, obtaining a degree with honours at the University of Bologna in Medieval History. Her real passion, however, has always been singing, which she began studying at the age of 14. When she was very young, she has been a finalist in the Concorso di Castrocaro and in the Song Academy of Sanremo. Thanks to her contacts in the fashion world she performs mostly abroad, not being interested in the Italian market which she has often declared to be provincial and not based on merit. She has performed with the Demo Morselli Orchestra, The Platters and Gipsy Kings. She has opened some concerts for Dionne Warwick and performed at the Cannes Publicity Festival. She continues to alternate singing and modelling preferring to work abroad. She has been asked to present famous events abroad thanks to her excellent knowledge of English. For some years now Patrizia has returned to jazz, her old passion, collaborating with Simone Giannotti Jazz Septet and performing in a Duo with the same Giannotti.

== Personal life ==
Patrizia has a son, Umberto, born in 2003. She is married to the actor and director Antonio Maria Magro in 2017.

== Discography ==
=== Studio albums ===
- Patty Deitos and The Smooth Players (2013)
- Ho incontrato Greta Garbo (2020)

=== Singles ===
- "Time After Time" (2013)
- "Sailing" (2013)
- "Eyes" (2019)
- "Olfattologia" (2019)
- "La Bella Vestita" (2019)
- "Illogico Jazz" (2022)
- "È quasi l'alba" (2022)
- "Satisfaction" (2023)
- "Quizás Quizás Quizás" (2024)
- "Never Enough" (2024)
- "The Windmills of your mind" (2025)
- "The Shadow of your Smile" (2026)
- "Now You Are Gone" (2026)

=== Collaborative albums ===
- Mother Tongue (with Effi Shoshani) (2011)

== Agencies ==
- Why Not Model Agency
- Riccardo Gay Model Management
