= Ksenia Kahnovich =

Russian fashion model (born 1987)

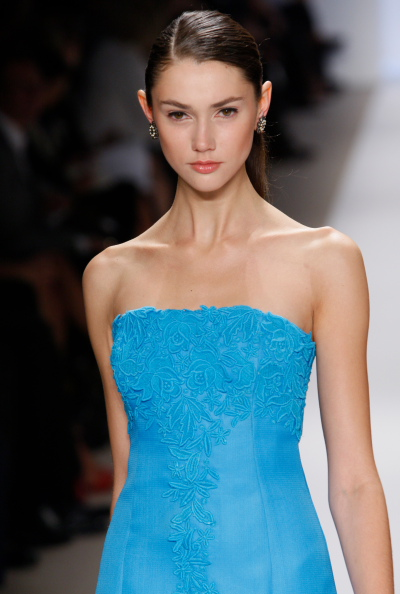
- Ksenia Kahnovich in the Badgley Mischka Spring 2009 fashion show.
- Born: Ksenia Kahnovich; January 29, 1987 (age 39); Vladivostok, Russian SFSR, Soviet Union
- Spouse: Kim Öhrling (2015-present)
- Modeling information
- Height: 1.80 m (5 ft 11 in)
- Hair color: Brown
- Eye color: Hazel
- Agency: IMG Models (New York, Paris, Milan, London); Mega Model Agency (Hamburg); Satoru Japan Inc. (Tokyo)

Ksenia Kahnovich (Russian: Ксения Кахнович; born January 29, 1987) is a Russian former fashion model, who won the first cycle of the reality television show You are a Supermodel, the Russian adaptation of America's Next Top Model created by Tyra Banks.

== Career ==
You are a Supermodel, Cycle 1 was held in 2004 and was won by the then 16-year-old Kahnovich, who was born in Vladivostok, USSR. She refused the first prize, which was an agency contract with NEXT Model Management as she already received a more lucrative offer from IMG Models in the time between the show was taped and the final was aired. When her victory was officially announced, Kahnovich had already moved to Paris

In October 2015, Kahnovich was ranked by Cosmopolitan as one of the most successful contestants of the Top Model franchise.
