= You are a supermodel =

Russian reality television show

- Show logo
- Russian: Ты - супермодель
- Genre: Reality television
- Based on: Top Model by Tyra Banks
- Presented by: Fyodor Bondarchuk (1-2); Alexander Tsekalo (3); Svetlana Bondarchuk (4)
- Judges: Oxana Fedorova (2); Tatiana Mikhalkova; Elena Myasnikova; Ellen Verbeek
- Country of origin: Russia
- No. of seasons: 4
- No. of episodes: 48

Production
- Running time: 60 minutes

Original release
- Network: STS
- Release: March 27, 2004 – December 22, 2007

You are a supermodel (Russian: "Ты - супермодель") is a Russian reality show on the STS TV channel, in which aspiring models vied for a contract with international modeling agency worth 250,000 dollars. The show was presented by Fyodor Bondarchuk during its first two seasons, with Alexander Tsekalo taking over for the third season. The host of the fourth season was Bondarchuk's wife Svetlana Bondarchuk.

The first cycle was held in 2004 and was won by 17-year-old Ksenia Kahnovich who refused the first prize, which was a contract with NEXT model management because she had already received a more lucrative offer by that time. Since the time of her victory, Kahnovich has become a very successful model, having walked in fashion shows for big names such as Versace, Louis Vuitton, Christian Dior and Dolce and Gabbana in New York, Paris and Milan.

Cycle two was held exactly one year after the first one and saw victory for Svetlana Sergienko, who was asked by Russian president Vladimir Putin to join the parliament as a representative for the growing modeling industry in Russia.

The show was discontinued after four cycles and returned under the name Top Model po-russki on Muz-TV in 2011.

== Format ==
The finalists live in a house together in Moscow, and face different competitions in modeling, sports and entertainment. At the end of each episode there is an elimination round where one girl is sent home until there is only one girl left.

Prominent faces of Russia's entertainment and modeling industry co-star as mentors or guest judges, giving their opinions and helping decide the eliminations at the end of the show. The main photographers as of the end of cycle were Dmitry Zhuravlev and Vladimir Glynin.

== Cycles ==
Cycle	Premiere date	Winner	Runner-up	Other contestants in order of elimination	Number of contestants
1	27 March 2004	Ksenia Kahnovich	Aleksandra Oleynik	Olga Sandrakova, Elena Umnova, Anastasia Polunina, Natalia Churayeva, Olga Shekhereva, Veronika Nedorub, Ksenia Pirozhkova & Varvara Serova, Anastasia Salozubova & Evgenia Tolstikova, Yulia Oleynik & Yulia Vorobieva	14
2	29 January 2005	Svetlana Sergienko	Arina Morozova	Kristina Andreeva, Alena Tsepova, Ekaterina Borisova, Darya Ivanova, Yulia Ivanova, Anna Borodina, Svetlana Kostecko, Tatyana Tanayeva, Nataliya Malyutina, Kseniya Khizhnyak, Anastasia Titova	13
3	14 January 2006	Tatyana Pekurovskaya	Viktoria Maruseva	Olga Vyatkina & Polina Lynova, Olga Kagarlitskaya, Vera Kirienko (quit), Svetlana Zavialova, Olga Volkova, Maya Puzhaeva (quit), Ekaterina Lomachinskaya, Elena Volkova, Aleksandra Gurkova, Elvira Teslina, Aleksandra Kesova, Anna Petukhova	15
4	6 October 2007	Tatyana Krokhina	Alevtina Kuptsova & Yulia Kuchina	Marta Georgieva, Anna Belova, Dana Borisenko, Irina Tokareva, Anastasia Bogushevskaya, Yulia Zavyalova, Darya Sverchkova, Lyudmila Krimer, Irina Galushkina, Aleksandra Lobanova	13
