= Top Model po-russki =

Television series

- Show logo
- Russian: Топ-модель по-русски
- Genre: Reality television
- Based on: America's Next Top Model by Tyra Banks
- Presented by: Ksenia Sobchak (1-3); Irina Shayk (4); Natasha Stefanenko (5)
- Judges: Elena Suprun (1); Mikhail Korolev (1); Inna Zobova (1-3); Danila Polyakov (2-3); Irina Shayk (4); J. Alexander (4); Tess Feuilhade (4); Vincent McDoom (4); Ksenia Sobchak (1-3, 5); Vlad Lisovets(1-3, 5); Denis Simachev (5); Natasha Stefanenko (5)
- Country of origin: Russia
- No. of seasons: 5
- No. of episodes: 66

Production
- Executive producers: Olga Akimtseva; Nikolay Golovin
- Running time: 60 minutes

Original release
- Network: Muz-TV (Seasons 1-3); Yu-TV (Season 4-5)
- Release: April 3, 2011 – December 28, 2014

Top Model po-russki (Топ-модель по-русски; English: Top Model Russian-style) is a Russian reality television show and the second Russian adaptation of Tyra Banks' America's Next Top Model, after You are a Supermodel, which aired from 2004 to 2007. The show saw a number of aspiring models competing against each other in a variety of challenges and photo shoots to win the title of the next Russian top model, along with lucrative modelling and cosmetic contracts among other prizes, in the hope of a successful career in the modeling industry. The series aired five seasons from 2011 until its conclusion in 2014.

== History and background ==
In mid 2010, Muz-TV published a press release announcing that it was working on producing a new Russian adaptation of the Top Model franchise. This followed the first, earlier adaptation of the show, which had been hosted by Fyodor Bondarchuk.

The first season of the show premiered in April of 2011, and saw seventeen contestants vying for the title. The winner of this first season was 21 year-old Mariya Lesovaya from Yekaterinburg. The network aired two episodes of the show back to back each week, so that each season aired for an average of only about 6 to 8 weeks. The following three seasons of the show aired biannually into the end of 2012.

After the conclusion of season three it was announced that the series would be switching channels from Muz-TV to Yu-TV in an effort to reach a higher share of female viewers. Both channels have since become a part of Russia's Media1 group of companies. The move also came along with an increased budget for the show's fourth season, which was filmed entirely in France, and featured a fully revamped panel of judges.

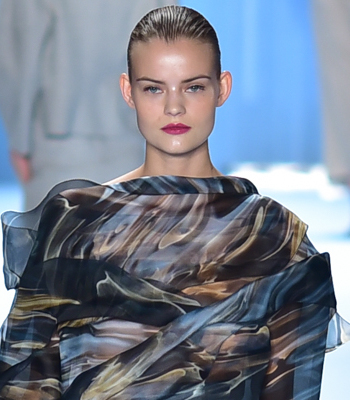
Season four runner-up Katya Grigoryeva, pictured walking for Carolina Herrera's fall-winter collection in 2015, has been the show's most successful contestant to date. She was a Victoria's Secret Angel from 2015 to 2016.

Season four began airing in the fall of 2012 with single weekly episodes released over a period of twelve weeks. On November of that year, it was announced that the show would be cancelled following the season finale.

The project was shelved for two years, until the show made a comeback with a fifth and final season in 2014. This final season of the show featured an international cast with contestants from around the world, including cross-overs with contestants Kristine Smirnova and Juste Juozapaityte from the Estonian and British adaptations of the show, respectively.

In addition to Lesovaya, the show produced four additional winners: Katya Bagrova, Tatyana Kozuto, Yulya Farkhutdinova, and Evgeniya Nekrasova. It also helped springboard the career of Victoria's Secret Angel Katya Grigoryeva, who signed with host Irina Shayk's agency The Lions Management shortly after her time on the show, leading to her debut at New York Fashion Week in 2014.

The show maintained sponsorship deals with brands like Blend-A-Med, Bruno Banani, Camay, Centro, Cosmopolitan, Glamour, Max Factor, Orsoten Slim, s.Oliver, Venus, and Wella throughout the entirety of its run.

== Judges ==
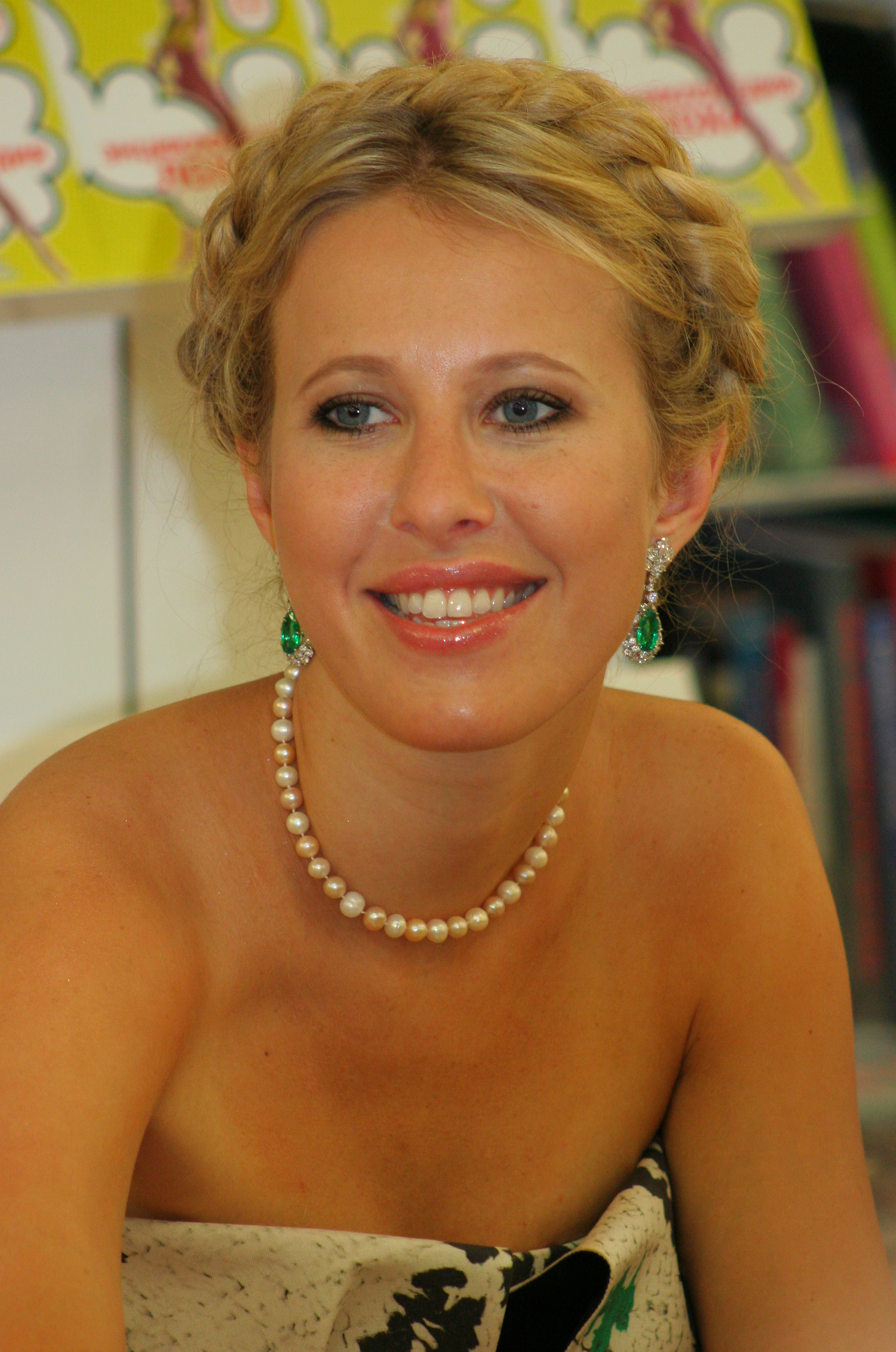
Ksenia Sobchak

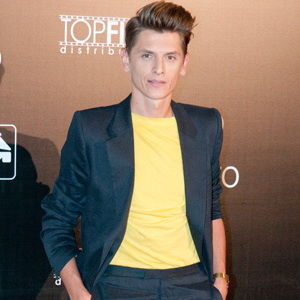
Vlad Lisovets

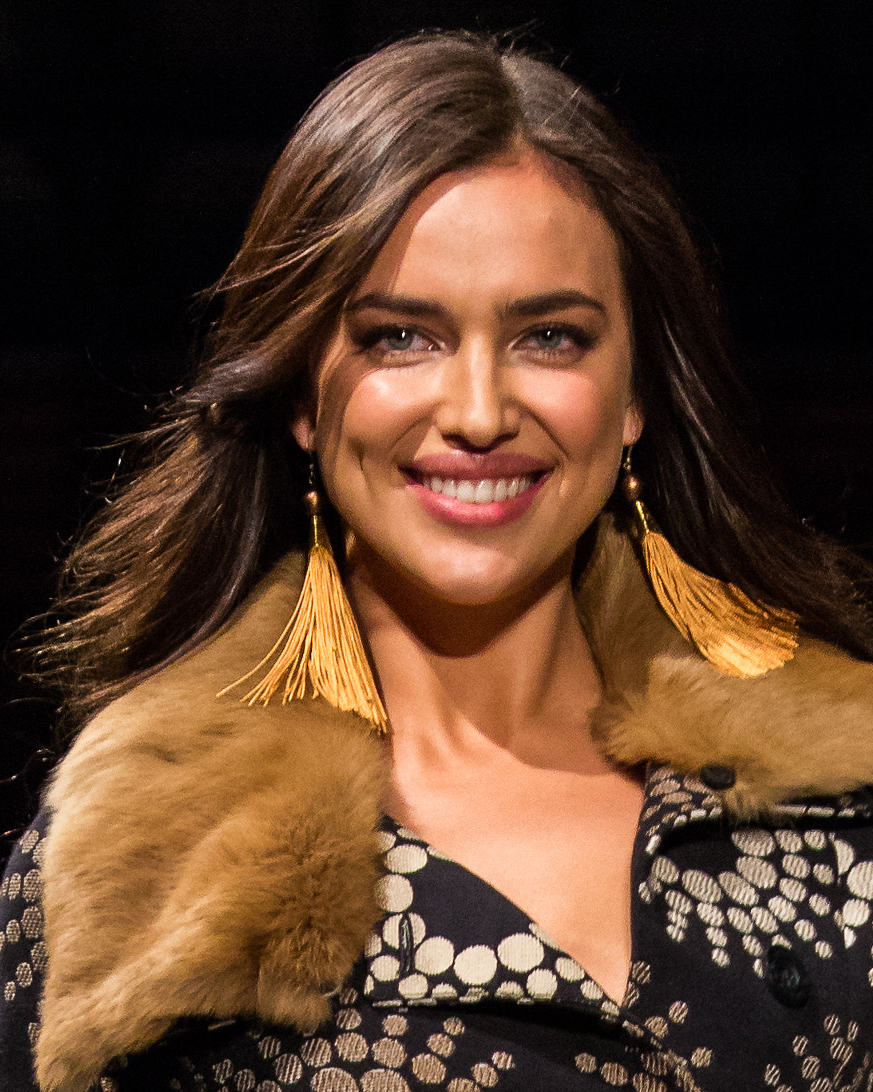
Irina Shayk

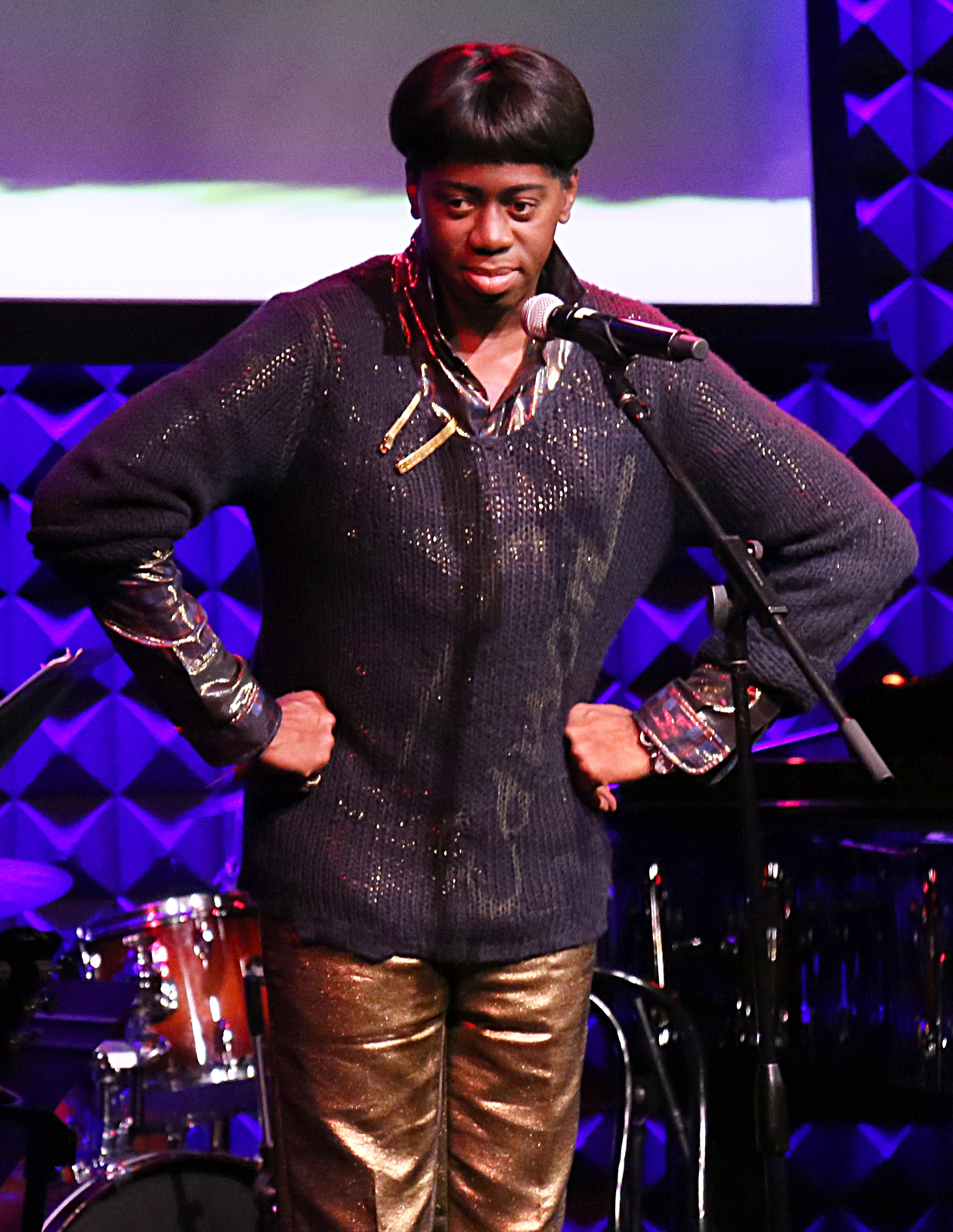
J. Alexander

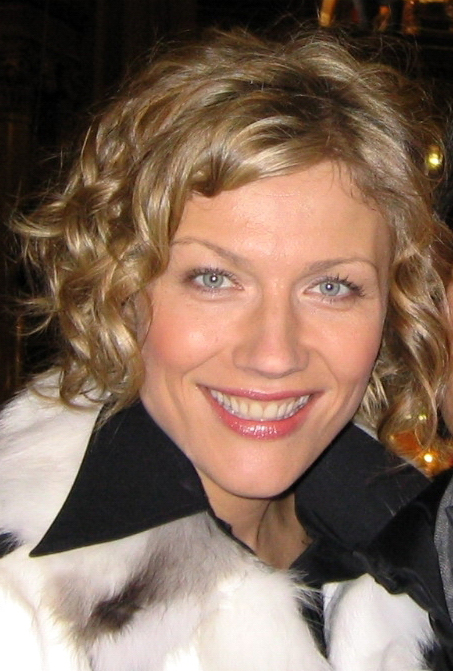
Natasha Stefanenko

For the first three seasons the competition was hosted by Ksenia Sobchak. The judging panel of the first season were Sobchak, model Inna Zobova, fashion designer Elena Suprun and photographer Mikhail Korolev.

For season two 2, Suprun and Korolev left the show and were replaced by model Danila Polyakov and stylist, fashion designer & TV presenter Vlad Lisovets.

The entire panel was revamped after season three. Model Irina Shayk took over the hosting duties. The other members of the judging panel were J. Alexander, Tess Feuilhade, and Vincent McDoom. None of them returned for the following season.

For the fifth and final season, Lisovets and Sobchak returned to the show as judges. They were joined by new judge Denis Simachev. Model, actress, and TV presenter Natasha Stefanenko became the show's new host after Irina Shayk decided to step away from the program, citing discomfort over the role. Stefanenko had previously been the host of Italia's Next Top Model for the duration of its run from 2007 to 2011.

In addition to the regular panel of judges the show also featured an additional guest judge each episode, periodically hosting guest appearances from the American adaptation of the show such as Janice Dickinson, Jay Manuel, Nigel Barker, and Tyra Banks.

Judge	Cycles				
Judge	1 (2011)	2 (2011)	3 (2012)	4 (2012)	5 (2014)
Ksenia Sobchak	Host & head judge	Host & head judge	Host & head judge		Judge
Elena Suprun	Judge				
Inna Zobova	Judge	Judge	Judge		
Mikhail Korolev	Judge				
Danila Polyakov		Judge	Judge		
Vlad Lisovets		Judge	Judge		Judge
Irina Shayk				Host & head judge	
J. Alexander				Judge	
Tess Feuilhade				Judge	
Vincent McDoom				Judge	
Natasha Stefanenko					Host & head judge
Denis Simachev					Judge

== Cycles ==
Cycle	Premiere date	Winner	Runner-up	Other contestants in order of elimination	Number of contestants	International Destinations
1	3 April 2011	Mariya Lesovaya	Irina Adadurova	Katya Nikulina, Yelena Domashnyaya, Alyona Prokopova (quit), Karmela Amadio, Kseniya Dmitriyeva, Valeriya Chertok, Kseniya Viktorova, Arina Perchik, Anastasiya Zharinova, Liza Ramuravelu, Kseniya Timofeeva, Evgeniya Timakova, Olga Timofeeva, Masha Minogarova, Evgeniya Frank	17	New York City
2	25 September 2011	Katya Bagrova	Yulya Vlasenko	Arnela Butuyeva, Liza Oleshko, Anzhelika Yakuseva, Sveta Babiy, Anastasiya Belkina, Margo Lukina, Vera Butakova (quit), Anzhelika Tikhonenko, Dobromira Nepomnyashchaya, Katya Streltsova, Alina Fedulova, Olga Ponomar	14	London
3	25 March 2012	Tatyana Kozuto	Anna Afanasyeva	Vera Sapozhnikova, Evgeniya Vasilyeva, Ira Koroleva, Yana Kondratyeva & Valeriya Ivanova, Anastasiya Savenkova, Natalya Pampukha, Dinara Elgaytarova, Evgeniya Shagdarova, Lidia Marycheva, Darya Korniyenko, Lilya Kotsur	14	Miami
4	16 September 2012	Yulya Farkhutdinova	Katya Grigoryeva	Natalya Petrova & Anzhela Igoshina, Anna Galyatskaya, Valeriya Sokolova, Ulyana Makarova, Alisa Yelizarova, Darya Minisheva, Veronika Istomina, Anna Sokolova, Anna Korotkikh, Anastasiya Krapivina, Alyona Moskalik, Valya Grigoryeva	15	Paris (Note: Cycle 4 was filmed entirely in Paris, France.)
5	26 October 2014	Evgeniya Nekrasova	Juste Juozapaityte	Anastasiya Senchukova, Sasha Plaksina, Elena Sarattseva, Alina Hoven (quit), Kristine Smirnova, Sofia Shum, Oksana Kavali, Alisa Shirokova, Olga Afonina, Darya Li, Masha Shapovalova, Tatyana Rumyantseva	14	None

== See also ==
- You are a supermodel (2004)
- You are a Top Model (2021)
