= List of Heroes of the Russian Federation (Z) =

This is a list of people who have been awarded the title Hero of the Russian Federation.

It has been awarded more than 970 times, of which more than 440 were posthumously.

== List of Heroes of the Russian Federation ==
- Akhmed Zavgaev (ru)
- Andrey Zavityukhin (ru)
- Vitaly Zavraysky (ru)
- Andrey Zavyalkin (ru)
- Amir Zagaev (ru)
- Zagid Zagidov (ru)
- Igor Zadorozhny (ru)
- Aleksandr Zazhigaev (ru)
- Anatoly Zaytsev (ru)
- Andrey Zaytsev (ru)
- Igor Zakirov (ru)
- Ilfat Zakirov (ru)
- Sergey Zalyotin
- Valery Zamaraev (ru)
- Grigory Zamyshlyak (ru)
- Albert Zaripov (ru)
- Vladimir Zakharov (ru)
- Pyotr Zakharov (ru)
- Andrey Zakharchuk (ru)
- Pyotr Zakharchuk (ru)
- Andrey Zvyagintsev (ru)
- Andrey Zelenko (ru)
- Yevgeny Zelenov (ru)
- Aleksandr Zenin (ru)
- Yevgeny Zinichev
- Nikolai Zlobin (ru)
- Oleg Zobov (ru)
- Vladimir Zhoga (ru)
- Andrey Zozulya (ru)
- Yevgeny Zolotukhin (ru)
- Viktor Zubov (ru)
- Denis Zuev (ru)
- Sergey Zyablov (ru)
- Badma Zhabon (ru)
- Vitaly Zhalnin (ru)
- Aleksey Zharov (ru)
- Sergey Zheleznov (ru)
- Gennady Zhidko
- Dmitry Zhidkov (ru)
- Zhantas Zholdinov (ru)
- Sergey Zhuykov (ru)
- Aleksandr Zhukov (ru)
- Aleksandr Zhuravlyov
- Aleksey Zhuravlyov (ru)

== See also ==
- Awards and decorations of the Russian Federation
- Awards and Emblems of the Ministry of Defense of the Russian Federation
- Awards of the Ministry of Internal Affairs of Russia
- Awards of the Federal Security Service of the Russian Federation
- Awards of the Federal Protective Service of the Russian Federation
- Awards of the Ministry for Emergency Situations of Russia
- Honorary titles of Russia
