= Top Model po-russki season 4 =

Top Model po-russki
- Season 4
- Judges: Irina Shayk; J. Alexander; Tess Feuilhade; Vincent McDoom
- No. of contestants: 15
- Winner: Yulya Farkhutdinova
- No. of episodes: 12

Release
- Original network: Yu-TV
- Original release: September 16 – December 1, 2012

Season chronology
- ← Previous; Season 3 Next → Season 5

Top Model po-russki season 4 was the fourth installment of the Russian adaptation of Tyra Banks' America's Next Top Model. This season featured a fully revamped judging panel: Ksenia Sobchak was replaced by Irina Shayk as host, with the judging panel consisting of J. Alexander, Tess Feuilhade, and Vincent McDoom. The entire cycle was filmed in Paris, France over the summer of 2012, and aired on Yu-TV from September to December 2012.

The prize package for this cycle included a fashion spread in Cosmopolitan magazine as well as a cover appearance in Cosmopolitan Beauty, a trip to a spa resort in Slovenia courtesy of Orsoten Slim, and a modelling contract with Women Management.

The winner of the competition was 22-year-old Yulya Farkhutdinova from Lensk.

Shortly following the cycle's conclusion, it was announced that a fifth cycle would not be broadcast; however the show returned in 2014 after a two-year hiatus.

== Cast ==
=== Contestants ===
(Ages stated are at start of contest)

Contestant	Age	Height	Hometown	Finish	Place
Natalya Petrova	19	172.5 cm (5 ft 8 in)	Kaliningrad	Episode 1	15–14
Anzhela Igoshina	20	177 cm (5 ft 9 1/2 in)	Kirov	Episode 1	15–14
Anna Galyatskaya	21	176 cm (5 ft 9 1/2 in)	Saint Petersburg	Episode 2	13
Valeriya Sokolova	18	175 cm (5 ft 9 in)	Stavropol	Episode 3	12
Ulyana Makarova	19	176 cm (5 ft 9 1/2 in)	Oryol	Episode 4	11
Alisa Yelizarova	22	171 cm (5 ft 7 1/2 in)	Saratov	Episode 5	10
Darya Minisheva	23	175 cm (5 ft 9 in)	Ufa	Episode 7	9
Veronika Istomina	18	177 cm (5 ft 9 1/2 in)	Chelyabinsk	Episode 8	8
Anna Sokolova	20	172 cm (5 ft 7 1/2 in)	Moscow	Episode 9	7
Anna Korotkikh	23	173 cm (5 ft 8 in)	Yakutsk	Episode 9	6
Anastasiya Krapivina	21	182 cm (5 ft 11 1/2 in)	Yekaterinburg	Episode 10	5
Alyona Moskalik	24	179 cm (5 ft 10 1/2 in)	Yuzhno-Sakhalinsk	Episode 11	4
Valentina 'Valya' Grigoryeva (Note: Valya and Katya are sisters; however, they competed individually.)	22	176 cm (5 ft 9 1/2 in)	Murmansk	Episode 12	3
Ekaterina 'Katya' Grigoryeva	23	180 cm (5 ft 11 in)	Murmansk	Episode 12	2
Yulya Farkhutdinova	21	179.5 cm (5 ft 10 1/2 in)	Lensk	Episode 12	1

=== Judges ===
- Irina Shayk (host)
- J. Alexander
- Tess Feuilhade
- Vincent McDoom

=== Other cast members ===
- Alexei Moskalenko - mentor

== Episodes ==
No. overall	No. in season	Title	Original release date
43	1	"Episode 1"	16 September 2012
The final fifteen contestants arrived in Paris for a round of introductions with Tess Feuilhade and Vincent McDoom, before moving into their hotel for the duration of casting. The following day, the models partook in a sight-seeing photo shoot where the goal was to create postcards for their families back in Russia. While the judges reviewed the results from the shoot, the contestants enjoyed a day of exploration throughout the city. At the end of the week, it was revealed that Anzhela and Natasha would no longer continue on in the competition.: Featured photographer: Lionel Gasperini
44	2	"Episode 2"	23 September 2012
The remaining thirteen contestants moved into their new home, and received runway training from judge J. Alexander. They were later styled in gowns for a high-end photo shoot session with bicycles, courtesy of Vélib. At panel, Anya G. and Valeriya landed in the bottom two, and Anna G. became the third contestant to be eliminated.: Featured photographer: Lucian Bor
45	3	"Episode 3"	29 September 2012
The contestants received a visit from Vincent McDoom for a lesson on personal style, and later had a photo shoot in pairs where they had to portray angels and devils in a campaign for Centro. At elimination, Lera became the fourth model to leave the competition.: Featured photographer: Riccardo Tinelli
46	4	"Episode 4"	6 October 2012
The contestants received makeovers, and later posed in a nude black and white photo shoot with male models photographed by judge Tess Feuilhade. At panel, Ulyana became the fifth contestant to leave the competition.: Featured photographer: Tess Feuilhade
47	5	"Episode 5"	13 October 2012
The remaining ten contestants had a runway lesson on the beach before making a celebrity appearance at the red carpet for the 2012 Deauville American Film Festival. They later had a photo booth challenge in which they had to have their photographs taken with male passersby, which was won by Alyona and Nastya. Later that night, they had to shoot a music video for Ivan Dorn. At deliberation, Alisa became the next contestant to be eliminated.
48	6	"Episode 6"	20 October 2012
The contestants arrived at the offices of Women Management, where they were introduced to Russian model Vlada Roslyakova, and had their walks and portfolios reviewed by members of the agency. After a house visit from Irina Shayk, the models were taken to Hotel Raphael to shoot a Rococo-inspired photo shoot session for Orsoten Slim. At panel, Anya K. and Veronika landed in the bottom two, but were both allowed to remain in the competition.: Featured photographer: Tommaso Cardile; Special guest: Vlada Roslyakova
49	7	"Episode 7"	27 October 2012
The contestants received a can-can lesson at the Moulin Rouge, and were invited back to watch the dancers perform that night. They were later photographed wearing bikinis by a pool in a campaign for Venus, and had a posing challenge back at the house. After deliberation, Dasha became the seventh contestant to be eliminated.: Featured photographer: Andreas Ortner
50	8	"Episode 8"	3 November 2012
The final eight models had a workout session and, after a brief visit to the Eiffel Tower, were introduced to model Elena Kuletskaya. They were later photographed in a campaign for Camay, and met couturist Franck Sorbier for a round of fittings. At elimination, Veronika became the eighth contestant to leave the competition.: Featured photographer: Sy Delorme; Special guests: Elena Kuletskaya, Franck Sorbier
51	9	"Episode 9"	10 November 2012
The models met Irina Shayk for a posing challenge in the streets of Paris while wearing their bikinis, for which Anya S. was later eliminated. They later had a smiling beauty shoot for Blend-A-Med, and met the editor-in-chief of Russian Cosmopolitan, Alya Badanina, during a trip to Disneyland. At panel, Anya K. became the tenth contestant to leave the competition.: Featured photographer: Jeffrey Galvezo Sales; Special guest: Alya Badanina
52	10	"Episode 10"	17 November 2012
The final five arrived at an abandoned insane asylum, where they learned that they would be taking part in an editorial photo shoot that would have them posing with a Vulture. They later had a day off from the competition before meeting the judges at panel for elimination, where Nastya became the eleventh contestant to leave.: Featured photographer: Tess Feuilhade
53	11	"Episode 11"	24 November 2012
The contestants were given maps and sent to visit designer Elena Isakova and photographer Alexandra Utzmann for feedback, while visiting several important fashion houses in the process. They later had their photos taken by photographer Andreas Ortner in a cover photo shoot and campaign for Wella. After deliberation, Alyona was eliminated from the competition, leaving Katya, Valya, and Yulya as the three remaining finalists.: Featured photographer: Andreas Ortner; Special guests: Elena Isakova, Alexandra Utzmann
54	12	"Episode 12"	1 December 2012
The final three were photographed as bond girls for their last photo shoot, and Valya was eliminated from the competition. The remaining two contestants, Katya and Yulya, walked in a runway show for Portuguese designer Fátima Lopes. At the end of the episode, the judges reviewed each models body of work, and Yulya was crowned as the winner.: Featured photographer: Tess Feuilhade; Special guest: Fátima Lopes

== Results ==
Order	Episodes												
Order	1 (Note: In episode 1, no panel was held. Anzhela and Natasha simply received a letter notifying them that they would not be moving on to the next stage of the competition.)	2	3	4	5	6	7	8	9 (Note: In episode 9, Anya S. was eliminated outside of judging panel after being deemed as the worst performer during that week's challenge.)	10	11	12	
1	Valya	Anna K.	Yulya	Darya	Valya	Anna S.	Anastasiya	Katya	Valya	Yulya	Yulya	Katya	Yulya
2	Alisa; Alyona; Anastasiya; Anna G. Anna K. Anna S. Darya; Katya; Ulyana; Valeriya; Veronika; Yulya	Katya	Anna K.	Anna S.	Alyona	Yulya	Katya	Yulya	Katya	Alyona	Katya	Yulya	Katya
3	Alisa; Alyona; Anastasiya; Anna G. Anna K. Anna S. Darya; Katya; Ulyana; Valeriya; Veronika; Yulya	Yulya	Katya	Alyona	Yulya	Valya	Anna K.	Valya	Alyona	Valya	Valya	Valya	
4	Alisa; Alyona; Anastasiya; Anna G. Anna K. Anna S. Darya; Katya; Ulyana; Valeriya; Veronika; Yulya	Anastasiya	Valya	Anastasiya	Anastasiya	Anastasiya	Valya	Anna S.	Yulya	Katya	Alyona		
5	Alisa; Alyona; Anastasiya; Anna G. Anna K. Anna S. Darya; Katya; Ulyana; Valeriya; Veronika; Yulya	Valya	Alyona	Yulya	Katya	Katya	Alyona	Anna K.	Anastasiya	Anastasiya			
6	Alisa; Alyona; Anastasiya; Anna G. Anna K. Anna S. Darya; Katya; Ulyana; Valeriya; Veronika; Yulya	Ulyana	Darya	Alisa	Anna S.	Alyona	Veronika	Alyona	Anna K.				
7	Alisa; Alyona; Anastasiya; Anna G. Anna K. Anna S. Darya; Katya; Ulyana; Valeriya; Veronika; Yulya	Veronika	Anastasiya	Katya	Darya	Darya	Yulya	Anastasiya	Anna S.				
8	Alisa; Alyona; Anastasiya; Anna G. Anna K. Anna S. Darya; Katya; Ulyana; Valeriya; Veronika; Yulya	Alisa	Veronika	Valya	Veronika	Anna K. Veronika	Anna S.	Veronika					
9	Alisa; Alyona; Anastasiya; Anna G. Anna K. Anna S. Darya; Katya; Ulyana; Valeriya; Veronika; Yulya	Darya	Anna S.	Anna K.	Anna K.	Anna K. Veronika	Darya						
10	Alisa; Alyona; Anastasiya; Anna G. Anna K. Anna S. Darya; Katya; Ulyana; Valeriya; Veronika; Yulya	Anna S.	Ulyana	Veronika	Alisa								
11	Alisa; Alyona; Anastasiya; Anna G. Anna K. Anna S. Darya; Katya; Ulyana; Valeriya; Veronika; Yulya	Alyona	Alisa	Ulyana									
12	Alisa; Alyona; Anastasiya; Anna G. Anna K. Anna S. Darya; Katya; Ulyana; Valeriya; Veronika; Yulya	Valeriya	Valeriya										
13	Alisa; Alyona; Anastasiya; Anna G. Anna K. Anna S. Darya; Katya; Ulyana; Valeriya; Veronika; Yulya	Anna G.											
14-15	Anzhela; Natalya												

The contestant was put through collectively to the next round
The contestant was eliminated outside of judging panel
The contestant was eliminated
The contestants were in the bottom two, but nobody was eliminated
The contestant won the competition
