= Vlad Lisovets =

Russian stylist (born 1972)

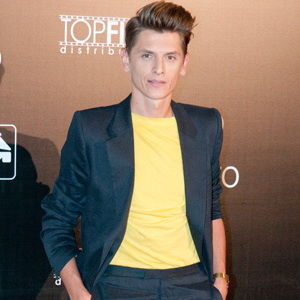

Vladislav Vasilyevich Lisovets (Russian: Владисла́в Васи́льевич Лисове́ц; born August 9, 1972) is a Russian stylist, hair stylist, designer and host.

== Biography ==
Born and grew up in Baku (Azerbaijan SSR). Vlad's parents are hereditary rail-men. His father, Vasily Lisovets, is a train driver; mother, Tatiana Lisovets, is a chemist in the laboratory at the railway. He has an elder brother. Vladislav studied at the ballet and music school. He was educated as a barber, and then got a degree in Psychology.

In 1994 Lisovets moved from Baku to Moscow. He worked in Ostankino Technical Center, as a stylist of Agatha Christie, Blestyashchiye, Anita Tsoy, Jeanna Friske, Valery Leontiev, Avraam Russo.

He owns several beauty salons.

Talk show host Female Form (from September 2008), Week-style and Beauty Needs on Domashny TV. Member of the jury of the TV project Top Model po-russki.

== Filmography ==
- 2009 — Moskva.ru as stylist
- 2010 — Daddy's Daughters as stylist
- 2012 — Your World (cameo)
- 2012 — Zaytsev +1 (cameo)
- 2014 — On March 8, the Man! as Anna's stylist
- 2014 — Di tutti i colori (cameo)
