= Antonio Maria Magro =

Italian film director, actor and screenwriter (born 1954)

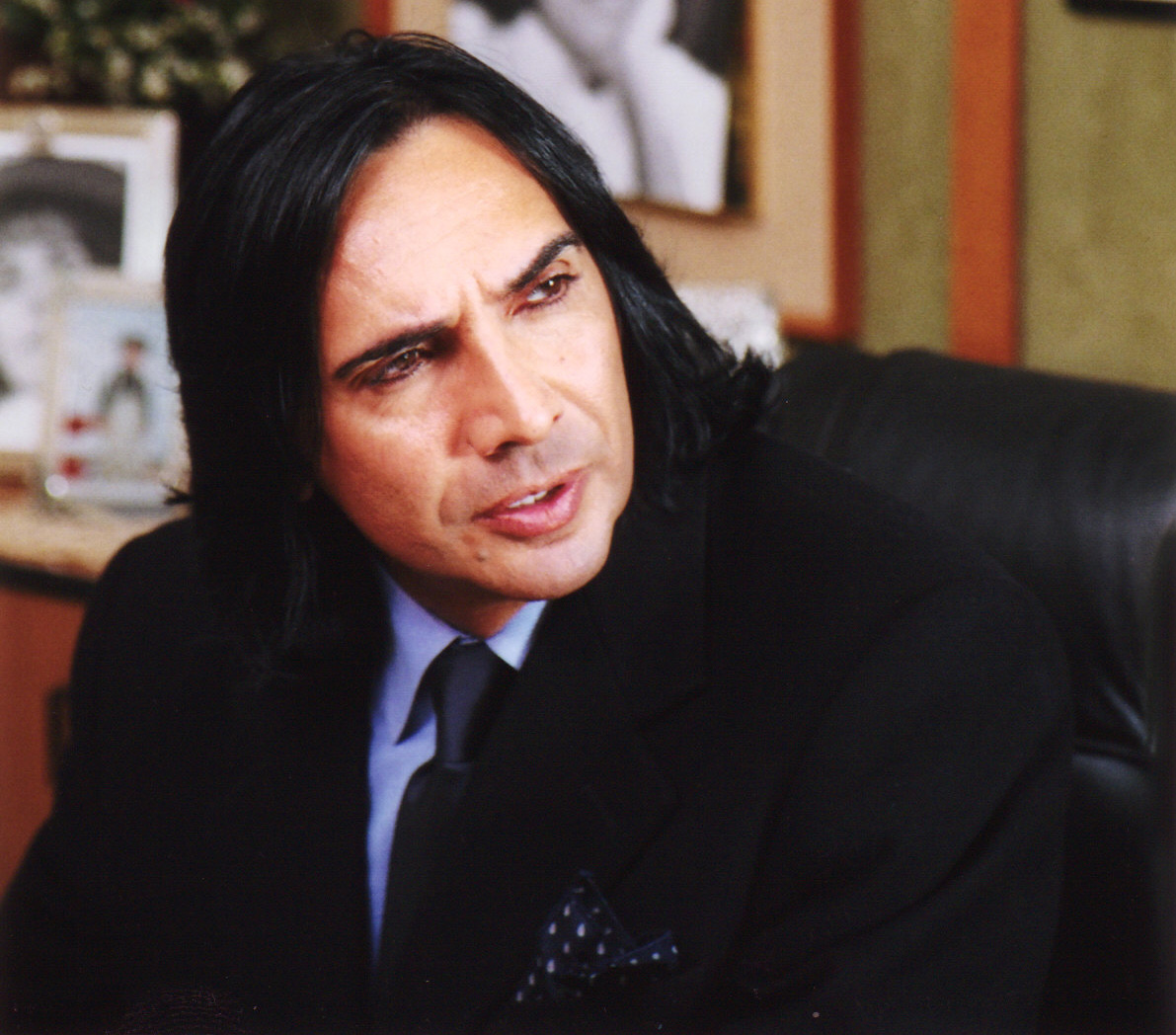
- Born: 5 June 1954 (age 71); Catanzaro, Calabria, Italy
- Occupations: Film director, actor, screenwriter
- Years active: 1976–present

Antonio Maria Magro (born 5 June 1954) is an Italian film director, actor and screenwriter.

== Life and career ==
Born in Catanzaro, he soon moved to Bologna, where he grew up. In 1980, he joined the Compagnia di Prosa Radiofonica di Firenze, the national radio acting company, in which he took part, as leading actor, to more than 300 plays. He then joined the Compagnia di prosa della RadioTelevisione Svizzera, the main Swiss-Italian radio acting company in Lugano, playing, throughout his career as a voice actor, along with top Italian actors like Vittorio Gassman, Giorgio Albertazzi, Arnoldo Foà, Salvo Randone or Giancarlo Dettori.

His first work as film director and screenwriter is 1976’s Decadenza, his first feature film starring Italian actor Raf Vallone. Over the following years, he directed many documentaries and TV commercials and, thanks to his distinguish work, in 1990 the University of Ferrara charged him of shooting a television film to celebrate the 600th anniversary of the foundation of the university: L’ulivo e l’alloro, which he wrote and directed and made him win the Special Jury Prize at the Vienna International Film Festival in 1992. In 1992, he shot two feature films he wrote and directed for his newborn film production company: Dov’era lei a quell’ora with world-famous Swedish actress Anita Ekberg, Italian actors Oreste Lionello, Dalila di Lazzaro, Riccardo Fogli and Storie di seduzione, co-starring with Florence Guérin and with Carrol Baker and Marina Suma.

For television, he wrote, directed and hosted I viaggi dell’anima for Rai 2, a 53-episode program. In 2003, he starred in I salmoni del San Lorenzo, an Italian-Hungarian feature film (co-produced by Rai Cinema and Cinema-Film KFT Budapest), directed by András Ferenc.

== Personal life ==
Antonio has a daughter, Maria Elena. He married the model and singer Patrizia Deitos in 2017.

== Filmography ==
=== Written and directed ===
- Decadenza (1976)
- L’ulivo e l’alloro (1991)
- Dov’era lei a quell’ora? (1992)
- Storie di seduzione (1995)

=== Actor ===
- I salmoni del San Lorenzo, directed by András Ferenc (2003)
