= Inna Zobova =

Russian actress, fashion model and beauty pageant titleholder

- Born: 1 October 1976 (age 48); Khimki, Russian SFSR, Soviet Union
- Years active: 1994 – Present
- Modeling information
- Height: 179 cm (5 ft 10 in)
- Hair color: Blonde
- Eye color: Blue

Inna Zobova (Russian: Инна Зобова; 1 October 1976) is a Russian actress, fashion model and beauty pageant titleholder who was crowned Miss Russia 1994.

== Pageantry ==
In 1994 she went on to compete in the Miss Universe pageant where she came in second in the National Costume competition and placed 12th overall.

== Modeling and fashion ==
In 2001, she ranked #51 in GQ's 200 Sexiest Women in the World and in 2002, she ranked #105 in The Glamour Girls Hot 500 and in the top 20 for GQ for 2005.

In August 2002, Inna was selected among over 600 models to become the then-new spokesmodel for Wonderbra and the face of the international brand Sephora in 2004, the year she also received the "Top Model of the Year" award at the Marie Claire Fashion Awards.

In 2011, Inna Zobova participates as a fashion expert and judge, to the TV show called Top Model po-russki, which is a local version of the famous U.S. reality show America's Next Top Model.

== Filmography ==
=== Acting ===
- Double Zero (2004) Alexandrie
- People (2005) Tatiana
- Z Joke (2013) Isadora

=== Notable TV guest appearances ===
- On a tout essayé (France2, 2005)
- Tout le monde en parle (France2, 2005)
- Eurotrash (Channel 4, 2005)
- Tout le monde en parle (France2, 2004)
- 20 heures pétantes (Canal+, 2004)
- Miss Europe 2003 (TF1, 2003) as a Judge
- Le grand Cabaret (France2, 2003)
- Porta a Porta (RAI, 2002)

=== TV documentary ===
- Soda (France 5, 2003)
- C'est leur destin (M6, 2002)

== See also ==
- Wonderbra Women

== Bibliography ==
- Thierry Mugler, « Fashion Fetish Fantasy», Ed. Thames and Hudson, Pictures 79, 81
- (in French) Topolino, « Make up games», Ed. Assouline, Pictures 15, 27, 69
- Capella, « Magic Time » Au profit de l'association War child, Ed. Kalven, Pictures of Inna Zobova during the haute couture backstages.
- Straulino, « Straulino », Ed. daab, Pictures 57, 59
- Photo, « Spécial plus belles filles du monde », n°395, Pictures 54, 55
