= Frøken Norge 2011 =

- Date: 27 August 2011
- Venue: Storefjell, Gol, Norway
- Winner: Anna Zahl

The Frøken Norge 2011 ("Miss Norway 2011") beauty pageant was held on 27 August 2011 in Storefjell in Gol Municipality, Norway.

The eventual winner was 23-year-old Anna Larsen Zahl from Sortland Municipality. Anna represented Norway at the 2011 Miss World pageant which was held on 6 November 2011 in London, the United Kingdom. The runner-up was 19-year-old Fay Teresa Vålbekk from Oslo.

There was no winner crowned for Miss Universe this year, as the final was held too late to send the winner to the 2011 edition of the pageant. This marked the first time that Norway was not represented in Miss Universe since 1999.

From over 500 applicants from all over the country, 40 quarter-finalists were chosen to compete in duels. The duel winners, who were announced on 23 May after a round of SMS voting, then made up the 20 semi-finalists. On 8 July, Ine Drikakisi from Oslo was announced as the winner of the Save the Children fast-track competition, and she was therefore guaranteed a spot in the Top 10. The competition was about collecting the most money for the charity in a creative way. The nine girls who would join her competing for the crown the final night were announced on 8 August after another round of voting (40% jury votes, 40% SMS votes, 20% Facebook votes).

== Final results ==
Placement	County	Contestant	Age	Height	Hometown
Frøken Norge 2011	Troms	Anna Zahl	23	1.70 m (5 ft 7 in)	Tromsø
Runner-up	Oslo	Fay Teresa Vålbekk	19	1.70 m (5 ft 7 in)	Oslo
Top 10; Finalists	Akershus	Nina Elise Fjalestad	18	1.70 m (5 ft 7 in)	Asker
Top 10; Finalists	Finnmark	Guro Olaussen	18	1.79 m (5 ft 10 1/2 in)	Karasjok
Top 10; Finalists	Hordaland	Nerea Hernández Eide	18	1.69 m (5 ft 6 1/2 in)	Stord
Top 10; Finalists	Nordland	Hanna Grav	19	1.74 m (5 ft 8 1/2 in)	Bodø
Top 10; Finalists	Oslo	Ine Drikakisi	20	1.80 m (5 ft 11 in)	Oslo
Top 10; Finalists	Sør-Trøndelag	Charlotte Svee Hestnes	19	1.74 m (5 ft 8 1/2 in)	Trondheim
Top 10; Finalists	Vest-Agder	Live Guttu	18	1.79 m (5 ft 10 1/2 in)	Kristiansand
Top 10; Finalists	Østfold	Anette Hunstad Frøland	19	1.73 m (5 ft 8 in)	Askim
Top 20; Semi-finalists	Aust-Agder	May-Britt Hagane	26	1.65 m (5 ft 5 in)	Arendal
Top 20; Semi-finalists	Hordaland	Malin Unneland	22	1.69 m (5 ft 6 1/2 in)	Bergen
Top 20; Semi-finalists	Møre og Romsdal	Karoline Kalvø	19	1.77 m (5 ft 9 1/2 in)	Giske
Top 20; Semi-finalists	Oppland	Nora Muqkurtaj	18	1.68 m (5 ft 6 in)	Brandbu
Top 20; Semi-finalists	Rogaland	Ellen Svendsen	18	1.70 m (5 ft 7 in)	Stavanger
Top 20; Semi-finalists	Sør-Trøndelag	Hanne Tinderholt Lenes	22	1.72 m (5 ft 7 1/2 in)	Trondheim
Top 20; Semi-finalists	Sør-Trøndelag	Mari Westad	20	1.67 m (5 ft 5 1/2 in)	Trondheim
Top 20; Semi-finalists	Telemark	Vilde Knutsen Varø	20	1.69 m (5 ft 6 1/2 in)	Porsgrunn
Top 20; Semi-finalists	Troms	Marte Idrupsen	17	1.68 m (5 ft 6 in)	Tromsø
Top 20; Semi-finalists	Østfold	Arita Fejzulai	21	1.75 m (5 ft 9 in)	Fredrikstad
Top 40; Quarter-finalists	Akershus	Marie Fougner Wang	19	1.79 m (5 ft 10 1/2 in)	Asker
Top 40; Quarter-finalists	Akershus	Marianne Lindbeck	18	1.77 m (5 ft 9 1/2 in)	Bjørkelangen
Top 40; Quarter-finalists	Akershus	Ida Nicoline Mosen Nyberg	20	1.76 m (5 ft 9 1/2 in)	Strømmen
Top 40; Quarter-finalists	Aust-Agder	Maren Elise Stribolt	19	1.80 m (5 ft 11 in)	Grimstad
Top 40; Quarter-finalists	Buskerud	Stina Marie Bakken	18	1.60 m (5 ft 3 in)	Hokksund
Top 40; Quarter-finalists	Buskerud	Hedije Tahiri	19	1.72 m (5 ft 7 1/2 in)	Drammen
Top 40; Quarter-finalists	Hedmark	Marita Michelsen	18	1.75 m (5 ft 9 in)	Kongsvinger
Top 40; Quarter-finalists	Hedmark	Renate Haga Ommestad	19	1.69 m (5 ft 6 1/2 in)	Hof
Top 40; Quarter-finalists	Hordaland	Hanne Otterå Årland	17	1.68 m (5 ft 6 in)	Austevoll
Top 40; Quarter-finalists	Møre og Romsdal	Stine Bjørsvik	18	1.74 m (5 ft 8 1/2 in)	Molde
Top 40; Quarter-finalists	Møre og Romsdal	Marion Dyrvik	21	1.77 m (5 ft 9 1/2 in)	Eidsdal
Top 40; Quarter-finalists	Møre og Romsdal	Eirin Søbstad		1.70 m (5 ft 7 in)	Averøy
Top 40; Quarter-finalists	Oslo	Camilla Haukaas	19	1.73 m (5 ft 8 in)	Oslo
Top 40; Quarter-finalists	Rogaland	Tonje Holen	21	1.78 m (5 ft 10 in)	Stavanger
Top 40; Quarter-finalists	Rogaland	Karoline R. Samuelsen	23	1.68 m (5 ft 6 in)	Stavanger
Top 40; Quarter-finalists	Vestfold	Elisabeth Askimdal Hersvik	23	1.70 m (5 ft 7 in)	Åsgårdstrand
Top 40; Quarter-finalists	Vestfold	Andrea Indrehus	18	1.55 m (5 ft 1 in)	Larvik
Top 40; Quarter-finalists	Vestfold	Charlotte Weber	18	1.70 m (5 ft 7 in)	Nøtterøy
Top 40; Quarter-finalists	Østfold	Martine Johansen	19	1.66 m (5 ft 5 1/2 in)	Sarpsborg
Disqualified contestant	Hordaland	Iselin Jeanett Eknes	23	1.68 m (5 ft 6 in)	Bergen

== Semi-final Jury ==
- Geir Hamnes, national director of Miss World and Miss Universe in Norway
- Kathrine Sørland, Frøken Norge for Miss World 2002, and Miss Universe Norway 2004
- Mariann Birkedal, Miss Universe Norway 2008, and Frøken Norge for Miss World 2010
- Omer Bhatti, rapper
- Bjørn Engberg, partner of the Frøken Norge Organization

== Final Jury ==
- Geir Hamnes, national director of Miss World and Miss Universe in Norway
- Mariann Birkedal, Miss Universe Norway 2008, and Frøken Norge for Miss World 2010
- Lillian Müller, model and actress, and former Playboy Playmate
- Carina Dahl, singer and model
- Alexx Alexxander, illusionist
- Lise Nilsen, choreographer, model and TV presenter
- Rolf Ørjan Høgseth, photographer
- Odd Rolfsen, coach and motivator
- Tina Rismoen, hairdresser and director of the Hairport hair salons
- Solvår Hegge, skin therapist

== Notes ==
- Iselin Jeanett Eknes (Hordaland) originally made it into the Top 20, but she was disqualified because she passed a certain unknown time limit set by the Frøken Norge Organization. She was replaced by Nerea Hernández Eide (Hordaland).
- Ine Drikakisi (Oslo) is half Fijian.
- Guro Olaussen (Finnmark) is Sámi.
- Nerea Hernández Eide (Hordaland) is half Spanish.
- Marion Dyrvik (Møre og Romsdal) was Miss Water (1st runner-up) at Miss Norway 2010. She went on to represent Norway at Miss International 2010.
- Three of the girls in the Top 40 are ethnic Albanians: Hedije Tahiri (Buskerud), Nora Muqkurtaj (Oppland), and Arita Fejzulai (Østfold).
