= Top Model Norge season 5 =

Top Model Norge
- Season 5
- Judges: Siri Tollerød; Jonas Hallberg; Donna Ioanna; Erik Asla
- No. of contestants: 18
- Winner: Frida Børli Solaker
- No. of episodes: 12

Release
- Original network: TV3
- Original release: September 16 – December 2, 2013

Season chronology
- ← Previous; Cycle 4

Top Model Norge, cycle 5 was the fifth cycle of Top Model Norge. The show began to air on television on September 16, 2013. For the first time, the show was filmed in Los Angeles. Siri Tollerod was the host, replacing Mona Grudt, and the other judges were Erik Asla, Swedish coach Jonas Hallberg and model scout Donna Ioanna.

The winner of the competition was 20-year-old Frida Børli Solaker from Valnesfjord. She received a contract with Women Management in Milan, a major campaign for Maybelline and a cover of Norwegian Elle.

== Episode Summaries ==
=== Episode 1 ===
First aired September 16, 2013

- Eliminated outside of panel: Amalie Raa, Malin Ludvigsen, Talita Trygsland & Tina-Marie Eliassen
- First call-out: Frida Børli Solaker
- Bottom two: Elise Finnanger & Lovise Helvig
- Eliminated: Elise Finnanger

=== Episode 2 ===
First aired September 23, 2013

- Quit: Mariel Gomsrud & Marita Gomsrud
- Re-entered: Amalie Raa & Malin Ludvigsen
- First call-out: Amalie Henden
- Bottom two: Malin Ludvigsen & Sunniva Veliz Pedersen
- Eliminated: Sunniva Veliz Pedersen
- Featured photographer: Marcel Leliënhof

=== Episode 3 ===
First aired September 30, 2013

- First call-out: Ayla Svenke
- Bottom two: Amalie Raa & Rachana Nekså
- Eliminated: Amalie Raa

=== Episode 4 ===
First aired October 7, 2013

- First call-out: Lovise Helvig
- Bottom two: Celina Mørch Honningsvåg & Malin Ludvigsen
- Eliminated: Malin Ludvigsen

=== Episode 5 ===
First aired October 14, 2013

- First call-out: Kristina Hansen
- Bottom two: Ayla Svenke & Celina Mørch Honningsvåg
- Eliminated: Celina Mørch Honningsvåg

=== Episode 6 ===
First aired October 21, 2013

- First call-out: Ingebjørg Strand Lende
- Bottom two: Ayla Svenke & Frida Børli Solaker
- Eliminated: Ayla Svenke

=== Episode 7 ===
First aired October 28, 2013

- First call-out: Lovise Helvig
- Bottom two: Amalie Henden & Ingebjørg Strand Lende
- Eliminated: Amalie Henden

=== Episode 8 ===
First aired November 4, 2013

- First call-out: Lovise Helvig
- Bottom two: Ine Ripsrud & Kristina Hansen
- Eliminated: Kristina Hansen

=== Episode 9 ===
First aired November 11, 2013

- First call-out: Rachana Nekså
- Bottom two: Ine Ripsrud & Marlen Fjeldstad
- Eliminated: Marlen Fjeldstad

=== Episode 10 ===
First aired November 18, 2013

- First call-out: Ingebjørg Strand Lende
- Bottom two: Frida Børli Solaker & Rachana Nekså
- Eliminated: Rachana Nekså

=== Episode 11 ===
First aired November 25, 2013

- Bottom two: Ine Ripsrud & Lovise Helvig
- Eliminated: Ine Ripsrud

=== Episode 12 ===
First aired December 2, 2013

- Eliminated: Lovise Helvig
- Final two: Frida Børli Solaker & Ingebjørg Strand Lende
- Norway's Next Top Model: Frida Børli Solaker

== Contestants ==
Contestant	Age	Height	Hometown	Rank	Place
Tina-Marie Eliassen	23	1.78 m (5 ft 10 in)	Los Angeles, USA	Episode 1	18-17
Talita Trygsland	29	1.77 m (5 ft 9 1/2 in)	Los Angeles, USA	Episode 1	18-17
Elise Finnanger	18	1.77 m (5 ft 9 1/2 in)	Oslo	Episode 1	16
Mariel Gomsrud	25	1.70 m (5 ft 7 in)	Los Angeles, USA	Episode 2	15–14 (quit)
Marita Gomsrud	25	1.68 m (5 ft 6 in)	Los Angeles, USA	Episode 2	15–14 (quit)
Sunniva Veliz Pedersen	18	1.73 m (5 ft 8 in)	Larvik	Episode 2	13
Amalie Raa	19	1.79 m (5 ft 10 1/2 in)	Bergen	Episode 3	12
Malin Ludvigsen	18	1.78 m (5 ft 10 in)	London, England	Episode 4	11
Celina-Therece 'Celina' Mørch Honningsvåg	20	1.76 m (5 ft 9 1/2 in)	Hamar	Episode 5	10
Ayla Svenke	18	1.79 m (5 ft 10 1/2 in)	Kongsberg	Episode 6	9
Amalie Henden	19	1.77 m (5 ft 9 1/2 in)	Søgne	Episode 7	8
Kristina Hansen	24	1.76 m (5 ft 9 1/2 in)	Lofoten	Episode 8	7
Marlen Fjeldstad	18	1.79 m (5 ft 10 1/2 in)	Halden	Episode 9	6
Rachana Nekså	22	1.78 m (5 ft 10 in)	Oslo	Episode 10	5
Ine-Merethe Ripsrud	21	1.74 m (5 ft 8 1/2 in)	Elverum	Episode 11	4
Lovise Helvig	19	1.77 m (5 ft 9 1/2 in)	Sandnes	Episode 12	3
Ingebjørg Strand Lende	18	1.76 m (5 ft 9 1/2 in)	Sandnes	Episode 12	2
Frida Børli Solaker	20	1.77 m (5 ft 9 1/2 in)	Valnesfjord	Episode 12	1

== Summaries ==
=== Call-out order ===
Order	Episodes												
Order	1	2	3	4	5	6	7	8	9	10	11	12	
1	Frida	Amalie H.	Ayla	Lovise	Kristina	Ingebjørg	Lovise	Lovise	Rachana	Ingebjørg	Ingebjørg; Frida	Ingebjørg	Frida
2	Ingebjørg	Ingebjørg	Marlen	Frida	Ingebjørg	Ine	Kristina	Rachana	Ingebjørg	Lovise	Ingebjørg; Frida	Frida	Ingebjørg
3	Kristina	Ine	Kristina	Ingebjørg	Marlen	Marlen	Frida	Ingebjørg	Frida	Ine	Lovise	Lovise	
4	Marlen	Rachana	Ingebjørg	Marlen	Ine	Kristina	Ine	Marlen	Lovise	Frida	Ine		
5	Celina	Frida	Amalie H.	Kristina	Lovise	Amalie H.	Marlen	Frida	Ine	Rachana			
6	Amalie H.	Ayla	Celina	Ine	Rachana	Lovise	Rachana	Ine	Marlen				
7	Marita	Amalie R.	Malin	Amalie H.	Frida	Rachana	Ingebjørg	Kristina					
8	Rachana	Kristina	Ine	Rachana	Amalie H.	Frida	Amalie H.						
9	Ayla	Celina	Lovise	Ayla	Ayla	Ayla							
10	Ine	Lovise	Frida	Celina	Celina								
11	Sunniva	Marlen	Rachana	Malin									
12	Mariel	Malin	Amalie R.										
13	Lovise	Sunniva											
14	Elise	Mariel; Marita											
15	Amalie R. Malin; Talita; Tina-Marie	Mariel; Marita											
16	Amalie R. Malin; Talita; Tina-Marie												
17	Amalie R. Malin; Talita; Tina-Marie												
18	Amalie R. Malin; Talita; Tina-Marie												

The contestant was eliminated
The contestant quit the competition
The contestant won the competition

- In episode 2, Amalie R. and Malin, who were originally cut in the semi-finals, re-entered the competition as replacements for Mariel and Marita.
- In episode 12, Lovise was eliminated at LAX before the finalists traveled to New York City.

=== Photo Shoot Guide ===
- Episode 1 Photo Shoot: Poolside Group Shot
- Episode 2 Photo Shoot: Posing Nude With pythons
- Episode 3 Photo Shoot: Jumping on a Trampoline for Moods of Norway
- Episode 4 Photo Shoot: Prom Dresses in an Alley
- Episode 5 Photo Shoot: Portraying Emotions During an Armageddon
- Episode 6 Photo Shoot: Maybelline ads in a Pool in Pairs
- Episode 7 Photo Shoot: Dominatrix in B&W with big cats
- Episode 8 Photo Shoot: Schwarzkopf Gliss Shampoo Campaign
- Episode 9 Photo Shoot: Los Angeles Starlets
- Episode 10 Photo Shoot: Sexy, Cool and Trendy Women for Schwarzkopf
- Episode 11 Photo Shoot: Elle Cover Tries
- Episode 12 Photo Shoot: Glamorous Gowns Over the New York City Skyline

== Judges ==
- Siri Tollerød
- Jonas Hallberg
- Donna Ioanna
- Erik Asla
