= Top Model (Norwegian TV series) season 2 =

Top Model
- Season 2
- No. of contestants: 13
- Winner: Kamilla Alnes
- No. of episodes: 12

Release
- Original network: TV3
- Original release: September 3 – November 19, 2007

Season chronology
- ← Previous; Cycle 1 Next → Cycle 3

Cycle two of Top Model aired from September to November 2007 and featured 13 contestants competing for the title of Norges nye toppmodell (English: Norway's new top model). Kathrine Sørland was replaced by Vendela Kirsebom as the host of the competition.

Among with the prizes was: a modeling contract with Women Management in Paris, a cover and editorial spreads in fashion magazine Cosmopolitan, appear on the campaign of Max Factor worth 150,000kr and appear on the campaign of Synsam worth 150,000kr.

The winner of the competition was 18-year-old Kamilla Alnes from Ålesund.

== Episodes ==
=== Episode 1 ===
Original airdate: 3 September 2007

- First call-out: Anette Wiborg
- Bottom two: Ann-Jeanett Angell-Henriksen & Kine Nordeide Johansen
- Eliminated: Ann-Jeanett Angell-Henriksen

=== Episode 2 ===
Original airdate: 10 September 2007

- First call-out: Polina Barbasova
- Bottom two: Kine Nordeide Johansen & Kristina Breivik
- Eliminated: Kine Nordeide Johansen

=== Episode 3 ===
Original airdate: 17 September 2007

- First call-out: Esther Roe
- Bottom two/eliminated: Kristina Breivik & Kristina Talleraas Holen

=== Episode 4 ===
Original airdate: 24 September 2007

- First call-out: Julia Brønn Lyon
- Bottom two: Agathe Høistad Guttuhaugen & Polina Barbasova
- Eliminated: Agathe Høistad Guttuhaugen

=== Episode 5 ===
Original airdate: 1 October 2007

- First call-out: Anette Wiborg
- Bottom two: Julia Brønn Lyon & Polina Barbasova
- Eliminated: Julia Brønn Lyon

=== Episode 6 ===
Original airdate: 8 October 2007

- First call-out: Ivanna Petrova
- Bottom two: Anette Wiborg & Kaja Hegstad Lilleng
- Eliminated: Kaja Hegstad Lilleng

=== Episode 7 ===
Original airdate: 15 October 2007

- First call-out: Kamilla Alnes
- Bottom two: Ivanna Petrova & Silje Løvik
- Eliminated: Silje Løvik

=== Episode 8 ===
Original airdate: 22 October 2007

- Eliminated: None

=== Episode 9 ===
Original airdate: 29 October 2007

- First call-out: Kamilla Alnes
- Bottom two: Anette Wiborg & Esther Roe
- Eliminated: Anette Wiborg

=== Episode 10 ===
Original airdate: 5 November 2007

- First call-out: Polina Barbasova
- Bottom two: Esther Roe & Ivanna Petrova
- Eliminated: Esther Roe

=== Episode 11 ===
Original airdate: 12 November 2007

=== Episode 12 ===
Original airdate: 19 November 2007

- Final three: Ivanna Petrova, Kamilla Alnes & Polina Barbasova
- Norges nye toppmodell: Kamilla Alnes

== Contestants ==
(ages stated are at start of contest)

Contestant	Age	Height	Hometown	Outcome	Place
Ann-Jeanett Angell-Henriksen	25	1.77 m (5 ft 9 1/2 in)	Bergen	Episode 1	13
Kine Nordeide Johansen	19	1.77 m (5 ft 9 1/2 in)	Yven	Episode 2	12
Kristina Holen Talleraas	17	1.76 m (5 ft 9 1/2 in)	Trondhiem	Episode 3	11–10
Kristina Breivik	20	1.77 m (5 ft 9 1/2 in)	Ålesund	Episode 3	11–10
Agathe Høistad Guttuhaugen	19	1.77 m (5 ft 9 1/2 in)	Oslo	Episode 4	9
Julia Brønn Lyon	27	1.75 m (5 ft 9 in)	Oslo	Episode 5	8
Kaja Hegstad Lilleng	16	1.79 m (5 ft 10 1/2 in)	Oslo	Episode 6	7
Silje Løvik	22	1.73 m (5 ft 8 in)	Oslo	Episode 7	6
Anette Wiborg	17	1.77 m (5 ft 9 1/2 in)	Drammen	Episode 9	5
Esther Roe	20	1.72 m (5 ft 7 1/2 in)	Oslo	Episode 10	4
Polina Barbasova	17	1.77 m (5 ft 9 1/2 in)	Oslo	Episode 12	3–2
Ivanna Petrova	17	1.75 m (5 ft 9 in)	Bergen	Episode 12	3–2
Kamilla Alnes	18	1.77 m (5 ft 9 1/2 in)	Ålesund	Episode 12	1

== Summaries ==
=== Call-out order ===
Order	Episodes									
Order	1	2	3	4	5	6	7	9	10	12
1	Anette	Polina	Esther	Julia	Anette	Ivanna	Kamilla	Kamilla	Polina	Kamilla
2	Ivanna	Kamilla	Silje	Esther	Esther	Polina	Anette	Polina	Kamilla	Ivanna; Polina
3	Kamilla	Silje	Polina	Silje	Silje	Esther	Polina	Ivanna	Ivanna	Ivanna; Polina
4	Polina	Kaja	Kamilla	Kamilla	Ivanna	Kamilla	Esther	Esther	Esther	
5	Kristina B.	Anette	Agathe	Kaja	Kaja	Silje	Ivanna	Anette		
6	Julia	Esther	Ivanna	Ivanna	Kamilla	Anette	Silje			
7	Esther	Agathe	Kaja	Anette	Polina	Kaja				
8	Kaja	Julia	Anette	Polina	Julia					
9	Silje	Ivanna	Julia	Agathe						
10	Kristina H.	Kristina H.	Kristina B. Kristina H.							
11	Agathe	Kristina B.	Kristina B. Kristina H.							
12	Kine	Kine								
13	Ann-Jeanett									

The contestant was eliminated
The contestant was immune from elimination
The contestant won the competition

- Episode 3 featured a double elimination during a regular judging panel.
- In episode 6, Ivanna was immune from elimination for winning the challenge.
- In episode 8 there was no elimination.
- In episode 10, Polina was immune from elimination for winning the challenge.
- In episode 11, there was no judging panel.

=== Photo Shoot Guide ===
- Episode 1 Photoshoot: Last Supper in Lingerie
- Episode 2 Photoshoot: Champagne in Prague
- Episode 3 Photoshoot: Sunglasses in a Lake
- Episode 4 Photoshoot: Burglars
- Episode 5 Photoshoot: Murder Victims
- Episode 6 Photoshoot: Pin-ups
- Episode 7 Photoshoot: Bathtubs in Iceland
- Episode 8 Photoshoot: Shoot with Nude Men
- Episode 9 Photoshoot: Styling Oneself
- Episode 10 Photoshoot: Action shooting
- Episode 11 Photoshoot: Bikinis in Normandy
- Episode 12 Photoshoot: Carnival

=== Judges ===
- Vendela Kirsebom
- Jan Thomas
- Bjørn Opsahl
- Linda Vasquez
- Mariana Verkerk - catwalk and posing coach
