= Top Model (Norwegian TV series) season 1 =

Top Model
- Season 1
- No. of contestants: 12
- Winner: Maria Eilertsen
- No. of episodes: 12

Release
- Original network: TV3
- Original release: September 11 – November 27, 2006

Season chronology
- Next → Cycle 2

Top Model, cycle 1 was the first cycle of the Norwegian adaptation of Top Model. It aired on TV3 from September to November 2006. The winner of the competition was 16-year-old Maria Eilertsen from Stavanger.

== Contestants ==
(ages stated are at start of contest)

Contestant	Age	Height	Hometown	Finish	Place
Eva Laading	22	1.77 m (5 ft 9 1/2 in)	Kristiansand	Episode 2	12
Toril Charlotte Ulleberg	19	1.78 m (5 ft 10 in)	Oslo	Episode 3	11
Trine Rekdal Hoel	21	1.77 m (5 ft 9 1/2 in)	Kolbotn	Episode 4	10
Nina Therese Aune	21	1.73 m (5 ft 8 in)	Namdalseid	Episode 5	9
Camilla Veie-Rosvoll	18	1.79 m (5 ft 10 1/2 in)	Bærum	Episode 6	8
Meriam Lerøy Brahimi	19	1.77 m (5 ft 9 1/2 in)	Bergen	Episode 7	7
Tara Midtli	17	1.80 m (5 ft 11 in)	Oslo	Episode 8	6
Cecilie Sundsbø	18	1.79 m (5 ft 10 1/2 in)	Tynset	Episode 9	5
Ingvild Jenhaug	21	1.74 m (5 ft 8 1/2 in)	Oslo	Episode 10	4
Iren Puskas Kristiansen	19	1.78 m (5 ft 10 in)	Ammerud	Episode 12	3
Lene Egeli	19	1.78 m (5 ft 10 in)	Stavanger	Episode 12	2
Maria Eilertsen	15	1.79 m (5 ft 10 1/2 in)	Stavanger	Episode 12	1

== Summaries ==
=== Call-out order ===
Order	Episodes										
Order	2	3	4	5	6	7	8	9	10	12	
1	Iren	Meriam	Camilla	Lene	Lene	Tara	Iren	Maria	Lene	Maria	Maria
2	Nina	Ingvild	Cecilie	Ingvild	Meriam	Cecilie	Cecilie	Ingvild	Maria	Lene	Lene
3	Ingvild	Lene	Nina	Camilla	Tara	Iren	Lene	Lene	Iren	Iren	
4	Lene	Maria	Maria	Tara	Maria	Maria	Ingvild	Iren	Ingvild		
5	Camilla	Tara	Lene	Meriam	Cecilie	Ingvild	Maria	Cecilie			
6	Maria	Trine	Ingvild	Iren	Iren	Lene	Tara				
7	Toril	Camilla	Meriam	Cecilie	Ingvild	Meriam					
8	Trine	Iren	Tara	Maria	Camilla						
9	Meriam	Nina	Iren	Nina							
10	Tara	Cecilie	Trine								
11	Cecilie	Toril									
12	Eva										

The contestant was eliminated
The contestant won the competition

=== Bottom two ===
Episode	Contestants			Eliminated
2	Cecilie	&	Eva	Eva
3	Cecilie	&	Toril	Toril
4	Iren	&	Trine	Trine
5	Maria	&	Nina	Nina
6	Camilla	&	Ingvild	Camilla
7	Lene	&	Mariam	Mariam
8	Maria	&	Tara	Tara
9	Cecilie	&	Iren	Cecilie
10	Ingvild	&	Iren	Ingvild
12	Iren	&	Lene	Iren
12	Lene	&	Maria	Lene

The contestant was eliminated after their first time in the bottom two
The contestant was eliminated after their second time in the bottom two
The contestant was eliminated after their third time in the bottom two
The contestant was eliminated after their fourth time in the bottom two
The contestant was eliminated and placed as the runner-up

=== Photo Shoot Guide ===
- Episode 2 Photoshoot: Makeover Shoot
- Episode 3 Photoshoot: Bikini BonAqua Shoot
- Episode 4 Photoshoot: Beauty Shot with Glasses
- Episode 5 Photoshoot: Lingerie Shoot
- Episode 6 Photoshoot: Shoot in the Rain
- Episode 7 Photoshoot: Shoot on a Boat
- Episode 8 Photoshoot: Galla Shot
- Episode 9 Photoshoot: Jungle Shoot with Snake
- Episode 10 Photoshoot: Brides on the Road
- Episode 11 Photoshoot: Ballerinas
- Episode 12 Photoshoot: Galla Shot

=== Judges ===
- Kathrine Sørland
- Hervé Bernard
- Sunniva Stordal
- Mette Mortensen
