= Top Model (Norwegian TV series) season 4 =

Top Model
- Season 4
- Judges: Mona Grudt; Marcel Leliënhof; Storm P.
- No. of contestants: 15
- Winner: Claudia Alette Bull

Release
- Original network: TV3
- Original release: February 7 – May 2, 2011

Season chronology
- ← Previous; Cycle 3 Next → Cycle 5

Top Model, Cycle 4 was the fourth cycle of Top Model. It premiered on February 7, 2011.

After the entire panel left the show, Norway's first Miss Universe title holder Mona Grudt became the new host, with the judging panel consisting of photographer Marcel Leliënhof and modelling coach "Storm P." Pedersen.

The show was filmed during summer 2010. After being off air for more than two years it was the longest break between two cycles the show ever had.

For the first time contestants as young as 14 years old were allowed to audition, but ultimately none of the top 15 contestants were younger than 16.

Among with the prizes was: a modeling contract with Premier Model Management in London and a cover and editorial spreads in fashion magazine Woman.

The winner was 19-year-old Claudia Bull from Stavanger.

== Episode summaries ==
=== Episode 1 ===
First aired February 7, 2011

After the selected 15 girls met in Oslo they received their first mail which took them to a hair salon. There they met their new coach Storm P., who informed them that they would receive makeovers. Dasha, the older sister of Katarina was first to burst out in tears with Eirin following soon.

At a dinner the girls met new host Mona Grudt and moved into their new home. The morning after, the last member of the new judging, photographer Marcel Leliënhof shot the girls for their first photoshoot, in which they were portrayed having plastic surgery with boyband member Ben Adams being their "surgeon".

Following the photoshoot, each girl was given a jewelry box, with all boxes but one containing a necklace. Roberta, Charlotte and Maiken were declared the top three of the week, while Farzaneh, Frida Mathea and Sarah Gindel landed in the bottom three. Sarah Gindel opened her box and found it empty, meaning she was eliminated.

- Bottom three: Farzaneh Davodi, Frida Mathea Kocian & Sarah Gindel Jabang
- Eliminated: Sarah Gindel Jabang
- Featured photographer: Marcel Leliënhof

=== Episode 2 ===
First aired February 14, 2011

The girls travel to Barcelona and move into a luxurious hotel suite. The next day the girls met Triana Iglesias who taught them how to pose in front of a camera. Bambie, Dasha and Charlotte were named the top 3 with Charlotte winning the challenge and receiving a digital camera as a reward.

At the photoshoot the girls are photographed as a group in Rococo/Haute Couture style. Facing their first real judging session the girls are introduced to Heidi Sinding-Larsen, editor of Woman Magazine who joined Grudt, Leliënhof and Iglesias on the panel.

Challenge winner Charlotte found herself in the bottom two, but in a shocking elimination it was Bambie who was sent home.

- First call-out: Claudia Bull
- Bottom two: Bambie Bang Vaage & Charlotte Isachsen
- Eliminated: Bambie Bang Vaage
- Featured photographer: Marcel Leliënhof

=== Episode 3 ===
First aired February 21, 2011

Storm P. woke up the girls calling out a surprised Signe Marie and Frida Mathea who both received another makeover. After they returned to the group a cheerleading training was arranged where the girls had to present various choreographies. Farzaneh was named the winner of the challenge and chose Signe Marie to share the reward with her which was a beauty treatment. Additionally she received a short cut yellow summer dress.

At the photoshoot the contestants were photographed wearing body paint and leggings in a box for an ad campaign by La Mote.

Serving as guest judges for the week were La Mote's production manager Christina Placht, Krister Falk, and make-up artist Cathrine Aas. Eirin was called "chubby" by Falk and stormed out of the judging room. Alexandra received best photo, meaning she was booked for the La Mote campaign which immediately was displayed on the official website after the episode ended. In the end, Dasha and Thea Sofie landed in the bottom two with Dasha being sent home.

- First call-out: Alexandra Sanneh Stølen
- Bottom two: Dasha Barannik & Thea Sofie Rabbum Karlsen
- Eliminated: Dasha Barannik
- Featured photographer: Marcel Leliënhof

=== Episode 4 ===
First aired February 28, 2011

- First call-out: Claudia Bull
- Bottom two: Signe Marie Taubøll & Farzaneh Davodi
- Eliminated: Farzaneh Davodi

=== Episode 5 ===
First aired March 7, 2011

- Quit: Signe Marie Taubøll
- First call-out: Katarina Barannik
- Bottom two: Inga Maurstad & Maiken Wahlstrøm Nilssen
- Eliminated: Inga Maurstad

=== Episode 6 ===
First aired March 14, 2011

The girls travelled to Dublin where they had another runway lesson by Storm P. followed by a casting for fashion designer Jennifer Rothwell. Claudia impressed the most and was booked to walk for Rothwell on the catwalk later the day. It was also revealed that the worst of them would get eliminated. Alexandra, Katarina and Eirin were named bottom three for the casting and a teary Eirin was eliminated.

Eliminated outside of judging panel: Eirin Hagstrøm

For the photoshoot the girls wore clothes by fashion designer Louise Kennedy, who was the guest judge for the week along with stylist Chen Nystrøm. Charlotte landed in the bottom two for the second time, however it was Thea Sofie who was sent home.

- First call-out: Roberta Grybauskaite
- Bottom two: Charlotte Isachsen & Thea Sofie Rabbum Karlsen
- Eliminated: Thea Sofie Rabbum Karlsen

=== Episode 7 ===
First aired March 21, 2011

The girls were taken to an acting lesson by Mia Gundersen. Following this, the girls had to use what they learned in a video shoot. Katarina benefited from her striking physical resemblance to Amy Adams, and was ultimately declared the winner of the challenge.

For the weekly photoshoot Marcel photographed the girls in his obligatory blue shirt. This time they were shooting different frames of a comic inspired shoot based on a Schwarzkopf advertising where the girls had to portray four different characters:

| Contestant | Character |
|---|---|
| Claudia | The Biker Chick |
| Roberta | The Biker Chick |
| Frida Mathea | The Goddess |
| Alexandra | The Guardian Angel |
| Katarina | The Guardian Angel |
| Charlotte | The Tomboy |
| Maiken | The Tomboy |

Actress Mia Gundersen and product chief for Schwarkopf Lena Jacobsen were the guest judges for the week. Alexandra and Frida Mathea landed in the bottom two with Frida Mathea being eliminated.

- First call-out: Maiken Wahlstrøm Nilssen
- Bottom two: Alexandra Sanneh Stølen & Frida Mathea Kocian
- Eliminated: Frida Mathea Kocian

=== Episode 8 ===
First aired March 28, 2011

Styled in a ghostly Annie Lennox fashion, Storm P woke up the girls in the middle of the night and told them that they have to pack their things for an early flight to their new destination of Dubai. After some sightseeing the girls faced off in a challenge where they had to name the designer label for different shoes. Charlotte scored the highest and won a pair of shoes by Hugo Boss.

The girls were in for another unpleasant interruption of sleep when Storm P. visited them in their hotel at 1 am telling them they have to prepare for the photoshoot. The girls were then taken outside the city for a desert-set exotic photoshoot.

Marketing director of Bonaventura Sales Gitte Hannestad and model and actress Viktoria Winge were the guest judges at panel. Alexandra landed in the bottom two for the second week in a row, but it was Roberta who was ultimately sent packing.

- First call-out: Charlotte Isachsen
- Bottom two: Alexandra Sanneh Stølen & Roberta Grybauskaite
- Eliminated: Roberta Grybauskaite

=== Episode 9 ===
First aired April 4, 2011

Storm P photographs the final 5 in black dancing blazers. They were then taken to do a Woman cover test shoot where they met the magazine's chef editor Ingveld Larsen and photographer Baard Lunde. Claudia and Katarina were named the top 2 of the challenge with the latter winning an armband.

The photoshoot took place in a lake, this time in cooperation with Lumene. After an unsuccessful session Charlotte was in tears, fearing her performance was not enough to carry her on to the next round. After the shoot the girls were taken to a House of Beauty as a reward for the last weeks.

Larsen and Skolvy were this week's guest panelists. Claudia and Alexandra were declared the best performing girls of the week, while Katarina was eliminated after landing in the bottom two with Maiken.

- First call-out: Claudia Bull & Alexandra Sanneh Stølen
- Bottom two: Katarina Barannik & Maiken Wahlstrøm Nilssen
- Eliminated: Katarina Barannik
- Featured photographer: Baard Lunde

=== Episode 10 ===
First aired April 11, 2011

Storm P took the girls on a boot camp to clean the pores before the other days physical recording. He also taught them how to dress and to adapt in the fashion industry. Both Alexandra and Claudia won a gift cheque for doing the best in the challenge. The day before the shoot the girls were surprised by a visit of their family and friends. At panel, Alexandra was sent home after her third bottom two appearance.

- First call-out: Charlotte Isachsen
- Bottom two: Alexandra Sanneh Stølen & Claudia Bull
- Eliminated: Alexandra Sanneh Stølen

=== Episode 11 ===
First aired April 25, 2011

The girls were taken to their final destination of London. Together with Mona the top 3 took a look back at their journey so far. At the challenge the girls had to pose as mannequins in the windows of a boutique. As all the girls did well, Claudia won the challenge by draw, with a designer handbag as her reward.

The following day, the girls were taken to their photoshoot for Solig AS, in which they wore bald head caps and body paint.

After the photoshoot Maiken was eliminated, leaving Claudia and Charlotte to battle for the title of Norway's Next Top Model in the season finale.

- Eliminated: Maiken Wahlstrøm Nilssen

=== Episode 12 ===
First aired May 2, 2011

- Final two: Claudia Bull and Charlotte Isachsen
- Norway's Next Top Model: Claudia Bull

== Contestants ==
| Name | Age | Height | Hometown | Rank | Place |
|---|---|---|---|---|---|
| Sarah Gindel Jabang | 22 | 1.70 m (5 ft 7 in) | Oslo | Episode 1 | 15 |
| Bambie Bang Vaage | 18 | 1.72 m (5 ft 7 1/2 in) | Haslum | Episode 2 | 14 |
| Dasha Barannik | 20 | 1.74 m (5 ft 8 1/2 in) | Oslo | Episode 3 | 13 |
| Farzaneh Davodi | 22 | 1.73 m (5 ft 8 in) | Rælingen | Episode 4 | 12 |
| Signe Marie Taubøll | 18 | 1.82 m (5 ft 11 1/2 in) | Drøbak | Episode 5 | 11 (quit) |
| Inga Maurstad | 18 | 1.74 m (5 ft 8 1/2 in) | Karasjok | Episode 5 | 10 |
| Eirin Hagstrøm | 18 | 1.73 m (5 ft 8 in) | Sarpsborg | Episode 6 | 9 |
| Thea Sofie Rabbum Karlsen | 17 | 1.76 m (5 ft 9 1/2 in) | Oslo | Episode 6 | 8 |
| Frida Mathea Kocian | 17 | 1.83 m (6 ft 0 in) | Oslo | Episode 7 | 7 |
| Roberta Grybauskaite | 18 | 1.72 m (5 ft 7 1/2 in) | Son | Episode 8 | 6 |
| Katarina Barannik | 18 | 1.75 m (5 ft 9 in) | Oslo | Episode 9 | 5 |
| Alexandra Sanneh Stølen | 20 | 1.75 m (5 ft 9 in) | Iveland | Episode 10 | 4 |
| Maiken Wahlstrøm Nilssen | 20 | 1.79 m (5 ft 10 1/2 in) | Stokke | Episode 11 | 3 |
| Charlotte Isachsen | 22 | 1.76 m (5 ft 9 1/2 in) | Oslo | Episode 12 | 2 |
| Claudia Alette Bull | 19 | 1.82 m (5 ft 11 1/2 in) | Stavanger | Episode 12 | 1 |

== Summaries ==
=== Call-out order ===
| Order | Episodes | | | | | | | | | | | |
| Order | 1 | 2 | 3 | 4 | 5 | 6 | 7 | 8 | 9 | 10 | 11 | 12 |
|---|---|---|---|---|---|---|---|---|---|---|---|---|
| 1 | Roberta | Claudia | Alexandra | Claudia | Katarina | Roberta | Maiken | Charlotte | Claudia; Alexandra | Charlotte | Claudia | Claudia |
| 2 | Charlotte | Farzaneh | Maiken | Inga | Alexandra | Maiken | Charlotte | Maiken | Claudia; Alexandra | Maiken | Charlotte | Charlotte |
| 3 | Maiken | Katarina | Inga | Thea Sofie | Claudia | Claudia | Katarina | Katarina | Charlotte | Claudia | Maiken | |
| 4 | Inga | Eirin | Katarina | Katarina | Charlotte | Alexandra | Claudia | Claudia | Maiken | Alexandra | | |
| 5 | Signe Marie | Thea Sofie | Frida Mathea | Frida Mathea | Thea Sofie | Katarina | Roberta | Alexandra | Katarina | | | |
| 6 | Claudia | Inga | Eirin | Eirin | Frida Mathea | Frida Mathea | Alexandra | Roberta | | | | |
| 7 | Thea Sofie | Frida Mathea | Signe Marie | Charlotte | Eirin | Charlotte | Frida Mathea | | | | | |
| 8 | Bambie | Alexandra | Farzaneh | Roberta | Roberta | Thea Sofie | | | | | | |
| 9 | Alexandra | Roberta | Charlotte | Maiken | Maiken | Eirin | | | | | | |
| 10 | Dasha | Maiken | Roberta | Alexandra | Inga | | | | | | | |
| 11 | Katarina | Dasha | Claudia | Signe Marie | Signe Marie | | | | | | | |
| 12 | Eirin | Signe Marie | Thea Sofie | Farzaneh | | | | | | | | |
| 13 | Frida Mathea | Charlotte | Dasha | | | | | | | | | |
| 14 | Farzaneh | Bambie | | | | | | | | | | |
| 15 | Sarah Gindel | | | | | | | | | | | |

The contestant was eliminated outside of judging panel
The contestant was eliminated
The contestant quit the competition
The contestant won the competition
- In episode 1, Mona announced that Roberta, Charlotte and Maiken were the top three of the week, and Frida Mathea, Farzaneh and Sarah Gindel were the bottom three with Sarah Gindel being eliminated.
- Episode 2's call-out order was changed by editing: Frida Mathea, Alexandra and Roberta were called sixth, seventh and eighth respectively, followed by Inga in ninth place.
- In episode 5, Signe Marie quit the competition the day before the photoshoot.
- In episode 6, Eirin was eliminated as a result of having performed the worst at the challenge.
- In episode 11, Claudia and Charlotte were put through to the final while Maiken was eliminated.

== Photo Shoot Guide ==
- Episode 1 Photo Shoot: Plastic Fantastic
- Episode 2 Photo Shoot: Group Shot in Barcelona
- Episode 3 Photo Shoot: La Mote Stockings
- Episode 4 Photo Shoot: Schwarzkopf Advertising
- Episode 5 Photo Shoot: Sunglasses and topless Thomas
- Episode 6 Photo Shoot: Mannequins in Louise Kennedy
- Episode 7 Photo Shoot: Comic Characters
- Episode 8 Photo Shoot: Norwegian Fata Morgana
- Episode 9 Photo Shoot: Lumene Advertising
- Episode 10 Photo Shoot: Kloofing
- Episode 11 Photo Shoot: Bald and Nude with Paint

== Judges ==
- Mona Grudt
- Marcel Leliënhof
- Storm P.
