= Frøken Norge 2009 =

- Date: 28 March 2009
- Presenters: Kathrine Sørland and Daniel Hamnes
- Venue: Lillestrøm, Norway
- Entrants: 12
- Winner: Eli Landa

The Frøken Norge 2009 pageant was held in Lillestrøm, Norway on 28 March 2009. 12 finalists were competing for the two winner titles. Frøken Norge World was chosen by 75% audience votes and 25% judges' votes and represented Norway in Miss World 2009 in South Africa, and the Frøken Norge Universe was chosen by the judges and represented Norway in Miss Universe 2009 in the Bahamas.

== Final results ==
Final results	Contestant
Frøken Norge 2009	Stavanger - Eli Landa
Frøken Norge World 2009	Skien - Sara Skjoldnes
Top 12 finalists	Bekkestua - Charlotte Rustad; Frogner - Siri Kristin Johansen; Hjelmeland - Anna Karina Bacca; Langhus - Natasha Ally Hammer; Sandane - Marita Frøyen; Tranby - Jasmin Mehrnia; Trondheim - Maiken Madeleine Gaup; Øyer - Silje Mathea Nylund; Ålesund - Martine Dønheim; Ålesund - Trine Dønheim

== Judges ==
- Pia Haraldsen (TV personality)
- Hanne-Karine Sørby Nilsen (Miss Norway Universe 2003)
- Natalia Davadi (winner of The Bachelor Norway 2008)
- Tom André Tveitan (winner of the reality series Robinsonekspedisjonen)
- Camilla Pihl (editor of Froken.no)

Among others.

== Notes ==
- Martine Dønheim (Ålesund) and Trine Dønheim (Ålesund) are twins.
