= Frøken Norge 2007 =

- Date: 9 April 2007
- Presenters: Vibeke Klemetsen and Synnøve Skarbø
- Entertainment: Askil Holm and El Axel
- Venue: Lillestrøm, Norway
- Broadcaster: TVNorge
- Entrants: 12
- Winner: Kirby Ann Basken

The Frøken Norge 2007 beauty pageant was held in Lillestrøm, Norway on 9 April 2007. 12 finalists out of about 2200 applicants were competing the final night for the two crowns.

The eventual two winners were Lisa-Mari Moen Jünge from Molde – Frøken Norge for Miss World – chosen by public voting, who represented Norway in Miss World 2007 in China; and the half-Filipina former Miss Intercontinental finalist from Oslo, Kirby Ann Basken – Frøken Norge for Miss Universe – chosen by the judges, who represented Norway in Miss Universe 2007 in Mexico.

== Final results ==
| Final results | Contestant |
|---|---|
| Frøken Norge 2007 | Oslo - Kirby Ann Basken |
| Frøken Norge World 2007 | Molde - Lisa-Mari Moen Jünge |
| Runner-up | Fredrikstad - Anna-Marie Augustin |
| Top 12 finalists | Bekkestua - Charlotte Rustad; Bergen - Anne Therese Samdal Rasmussen; Farsund - Malin Nilsen; Langhus - Maria Ben-Shams; Lillehammer - Ida Follerås; Lørenskog - Merethe Tunheim Vang; Oslo - Susan Elisabeth Hobbelstad; Sandefjord - Charlotte Hauger; Trondheim - Stephanie Palomino Davadi |

== Judges ==
- Kathrine Sørland (former Miss Norway, model and TV presenter)
- Runar Søgaard (leadership trainer and life coach)
- Kristin Spitznogle (psychologist/sexologist)
- Zahid Ali (comedian)
- Pat Sharp (British radio and TV presenter)
- Trude Mostue (celebrity veterinary surgeon)
- Lise Nilsen (former model)
- Marius Kopperud (radio presenter)
- Marita Niska (salesperson)
- Geir Lillejord (drag queen)
