= Ulleberg =

Ulleberg is a Norwegian surname. Notable people with the surname include:

- Erik Ulleberg (born 1950), Norwegian former tennis player
- Frithjof Ulleberg (1911–1993), Norwegian footballer
- Kari Ulleberg (born 1954), Norwegian glass artist
- Toril Charlotte Ulleberg Reynolds (born 1987), Norwegian politician
