= Top Model Norge =

- Created by: Tyra Banks
- Presented by: Kathrine Sørland (1); Vendela Kirsebom (2-3); Mona Grudt (4); Siri Tollerød (5)
- Country of origin: Norway
- No. of seasons: 5
- No. of episodes: 60

Production
- Running time: 60 minutes

Original release
- Network: TV3
- Release: September 4, 2006 – December 2, 2013

Top Model Norge (English: Top Model Norway) is a Norwegian reality television show airing on TV3, based on Tyra Banks' America's Next Top Model.

== Judges ==
Judge/Mentor	Cycle				
Judge/Mentor	1 (2006)	2 (2007)	3 (2008)	4 (2011)	5 (2013)
Hosts
Kathrine Sørland	Head Judge				
Vendela Kirsebom		Head Judge	Head Judge		
Mona Grudt				Head Judge	
Siri Tollerød					Head Judge
Judging Panelists
Hervé Bernard	Main				
Mette Mortensen	Main				
Sunniva Stordal	Main				
Bjørn Opsahl		Main			
Jan Thomas		Main	Main		
Linda Vasquez		Main			
Mariana Verkerk		Recurring	Recurring		
Marcel Leliënhof				Main	Guest
Storm P.				Main	
Erik Asla					Main
Jonas Hallberg					Main
Donna Ioanna					Main

== Cycles ==
Cycle	Premiere date	Winner	Runner-up	Other contestants in order of elimination	Number of contestants	International Destinations
1	4 September 2006	Maria Eilertsen	Lene Egeli	Eva Laading, Toril Charlotte Ulleberg, Trine Rekdal Hoel, Nina Therese Aune, Camilla Veie-Rosvoll, Meriam Lerøy Brahimi, Tara Midtli, Cecilie Sundsbø, Ingvild Jenhaug, Iren Puskas Kristiansen	12	New York City
2	3 September 2007	Kamilla Alnes	Ivanna Petrova & Polina Barbasova	Ann-Jeanett Angell-Henriksen, Kine Nordeide Johansen, Kristina Holen Talleraas & Kristina Breivik, Agathe Høistad Guttuhaugen, Julia Brønn Lyon, Kaja Hegstad Lilleng, Silje Løvik, Anette Wiborg, Esther Roe	13	Prague; Milan; Reykjavík; Paris
3	8 September 2008	Martine Lervik	Marita Skeivik Frost	Thea Christophersen, Sasha Danest Hammari (disqualified), Sina Gulbrandsen, Silje Hellenes & Martine Bjørke Dyb & Helene Hornstuen Urberg, Ida Nykås, Elise Haugen, Goshia Golab, Mona Lisa Ibrahim, Christina Slette Johnsen, Frøydis Labowsky (quit)	14	Lisbon; Marrakesh; Paris; New York City
4	7 February 2011	Claudia Alette Bull	Charlotte Isachsen	Sarah Gindel Jabang, Bambie Bang Vaage, Dasha Barannik, Farzaneh Davodi, Signe Marie Taubøll (quit), Inga Maurstad, Eirin Hagstrøm, Thea Sofie Rabbum Karlsen, Frida Mathea Kocian, Roberta Grybauskaite, Katarina Barannik, Alexandra Sanneh Stølen, Maiken Wahlstrøm Nilssen	15	Barcelona; Milan; Dublin; Dubai; London
5	16 September 2013	Frida Børli Solaker	Ingebjørg Strand Lende	Tina-Marie Eliassen & Talita Trygsland, Elise Finnanger, Mariel Gomsrud (quit) & Marita Gomsrud (quit), Sunniva Veliz Pedersen, Amalie Raa, Malin Ludvigsen, Celina Mørch Honningsvåg, Ayla Svenke, Amalie Henden, Kristina Hansen, Marlen Fjeldstad, Rachana Nekså, Ine Ripsrud, Lovise Helvig	18	Los Angeles; New York City

== See also ==
- Top Model (Scandinavia)
