= Frøken Norge 2010 =

- Date: 26 June 2010
- Venue: Noresund, Norway
- Entrants: 7
- Winner: Melinda Elvenes

The Frøken Norge 2010 beauty pageant was held at the Sole Hotell & Herregaard in Noresund, Norway on 26 June 2010. 7 finalists competed for the two winner titles.

The eventual winners were Mariann Birkedal from Stavanger, a former Frøken Norge (2008) runner-up and Miss Universe (2008) contestant – Frøken Norge for Miss World – who represented Norway in Miss World 2010 in Sanya, China where she was a Top 7 finalist; and half Motswana Melinda Elvenes from Larvik – Frøken Norge for Miss Universe – who represented Norway in Miss Universe 2010 in Las Vegas, the United States.

== Final results ==
Final result	Contestant|
Frøken Norge 2010	Melinda Elvenes
Frøken Norge World 2010	Mariann Birkedal

== The 7 finalists ==
Contestant	Age	Height (cm)	Hometown
Ida Myhrvold	18	167	Fredrikstad
Louise Angelica Markussen	19	165	Oslo
Maria Kassandra Barbantonis	18	165	Oslo
Mariann Birkedal	23	174	Stavanger
Marte Heggedal	19		Drammen
Melinda Elvenes	23	172	Larvik
Toril Tranø	24		Trondheim

== Notes ==
- Mariann Birkedal represented Norway in Miss Universe 2008 in Vietnam. Even though she was among the favourites to win the crown, she did not place in the Top 15.
- Melinda Elvenes was born in Maun, Botswana to a Batswana mother and a Norwegian father.
- Lene Kaland Eriksen was originally one of the eight finalists, but she withdrew from the contest for unknown reasons.
