= Shubert Theatre (Los Angeles) =

Theatre in Los Angeles, California, United States

Shubert theatre
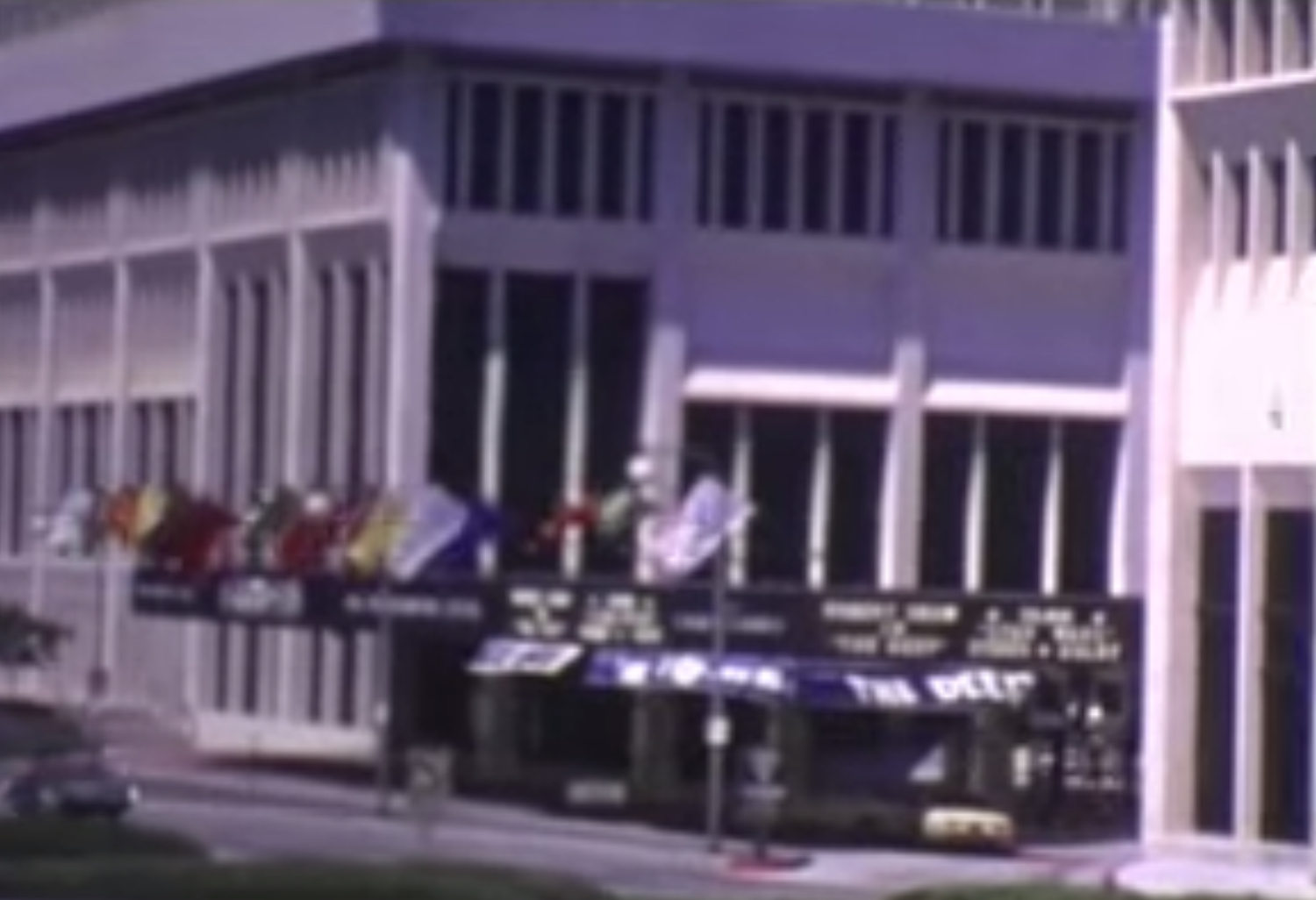
- Shubert Theatre, Los Angeles (1978)

- Location in the Los Angeles Area Location in California Location in the United States
- Address: 2020 Avenue of the Stars; Century City, California; United States
- Coordinates: 34.05821°N 118.41492°W
- Operator: Shubert Organization
- Capacity: 2,100
- Type: 1993

Construction
- Opened: Follies; July 22, 1972
- Closed: December 30, 2001
- Demolished: October 2002
- Years active: 1972–2002
- Architect: Henry George Greene

The Shubert Theatre was a 2,100-seat show house that opened in 1972 at 2020 Avenue of the Stars, Century City, Los Angeles, California. The theatre was demolished in March 2004 to make way for the 2000 Avenue of the Stars office building. The Shubert opened on July 22, 1972, with a production of Follies directed by Harold Prince and Michael Bennett. Other notable productions included A Chorus Line, Les Misérables, Cats, Evita, Sunset Boulevard, Dreamgirls, Ragtime, and Beauty and the Beast and the 1990 Miss Universe pageant.

On November 4, 2001, the theatre served as a one-off venue for the 2001 Primetime Emmy Awards when the event lost its scheduled venue, the Shrine Auditorium, due to postponement following the September 11 attacks. It had previously hosted the awards in 1973 and 1976.

Over the decades the entire complex had many owners. In the late 90's, the then owners decided to tear down the complex once the 30 year leases of the major tenants had expired and build an office building. News of the theatre being torn down came in early 1998, during the run of "Ragtime."

The Nederlanders’ decision to stage the sit-down production of The Lion King at the Pantages Theatre, rather than the Shubert Theatre, significantly affected the Shubert’s long-term viability. The Lion King opened at the Pantages in September 2000 and ran there for two years. Although the Shubert Theatre’s eventual closure was also influenced by the fact that it was leased rather than owned, hosting the production may have helped sustain the venue for a longer period.

The last show at The Shubert was "The Who's Tommy" on December 30, 2001 before being demolished in March 2004 to make way for an office building.

Preceded by Fiesta Americana Condesa Hotel (Mexico) Cancún	Miss Universe venue 1990	Succeeded by Aladdin Theatre for the Performing Arts (United States) Las Vegas
