= Top Model (Norwegian TV series) season 3 =

Top Model
- Season 3
- No. of contestants: 14
- Winner: Martine Lervik
- No. of episodes: 12

Release
- Original network: TV3
- Original release: September 8 – November 24, 2008

Season chronology
- ← Previous; Cycle 2 Next → Cycle 4

Top Model, cycle 3 was the third cycle of Top Model. It originally aired on TV3 from September to November 2008, and was hosted by Vendela Kirsebom.

The competition began with fifteen semi-finalists, who were narrowed down to thirteen finalists in the first episode. In the third episode, Silje entered the competition after Sasha was disqualified for refusing her makeover.

Among with the prizes was: a modeling contract with Trump Model Management in New York City, a cover and editorial spreads in fashion magazine Cosmopolitan, appear on the campaign of Max Factor worth 150,000kr and appear on the campaign of Synsam worth 150,000kr.

The winner of the competition was 17-year-old Martine Lervik from Ålesund.

== Contestants ==
Semi-finalists

Name	Age	Hometown	Outcome	Place
Vana Perisa	25	Gjøvik	Episode 1	16–15
Line Stolen Wilberg	16	Lørenskog	Episode 1	16–15

Finalists

Name	Age	Height	Hometown	Outcome	Place
Thea Christophersen	17	1.73 m (5 ft 8 in)	Asker	Episode 2	14
Sasha Danest Hammari	18	1.73 m (5 ft 8 in)	Oslo	Episode 3	13 (DQ)
Sina Gulbrandsen	21	1.75 m (5 ft 9 in)	Oslo	Episode 3	12
Silje Hellenes	19	1.78 m (5 ft 10 in)	Nevlunghavn	Episode 5	11–9
Martine Bjørke Dyb	19	1.74 m (5 ft 8 1/2 in)	Rælingen	Episode 5	11–9
Helene Hornstuen Urberg	19	1.78 m (5 ft 10 in)	Drammen	Episode 5	11–9
Ida Nykås	22	1.78 m (5 ft 10 in)	Skien	Episode 6	8
Elise Haugen	21	1.75 m (5 ft 9 in)	Haugesund	Episode 7	7
Malgorzata 'Goshia' Golab	17	1.77 m (5 ft 9 1/2 in)	Oslo	Episode 8	6
Mona Lisa Ibrahim	21	1.73 m (5 ft 8 in)	Kristiansand	Episode 9	5
Christina Slette Johnsen	20	1.83 m (6 ft 0 in)	Andenes	Episode 10	4
Frøydis Labowsky	24	1.80 m (5 ft 11 in)	Moss	Episode 12	3 (quit)
Marita Skeivik Frost	17	1.75 m (5 ft 9 in)	Stavanger	Episode 12	2
Martine Lervik	17	1.81 m (5 ft 11 1/2 in)	Ålesund	Episode 12	1

== Summaries ==
=== Call-out order ===
Order	Episodes										
Order	1	2	3	4	5	6	7	8	9	10	12
1	Goshia	Martine L.	Frøydis	Christina; Elise; Frøydis; Ida; Martine B. Martine L. Silje	Ida	Martine L.	Christina	Christina	Martine L.	Martine L.	Martine L.
2	Sasha	Frøydis	Martine L.	Christina; Elise; Frøydis; Ida; Martine B. Martine L. Silje	Mona Lisa	Goshia	Marita	Frøydis	Frøydis	Frøydis	Marita
3	Mona Lisa	Sasha	Marita	Christina; Elise; Frøydis; Ida; Martine B. Martine L. Silje	Marita	Frøydis	Martine L.	Marita	Christina	Marita	Frøydis
4	Elise	Mona Lisa	Christina	Christina; Elise; Frøydis; Ida; Martine B. Martine L. Silje	Martine L.	Elise	Goshia	Mona Lisa	Marita	Christina	
5	Helene	Goshia	Elise	Christina; Elise; Frøydis; Ida; Martine B. Martine L. Silje	Frøydis	Mona Lisa	Frøydis	Martine L.	Mona Lisa		
6	Frøydis	Elise	Martine B.	Christina; Elise; Frøydis; Ida; Martine B. Martine L. Silje	Elise	Marita	Mona Lisa	Goshia			
7	Thea	Marita	Silje	Christina; Elise; Frøydis; Ida; Martine B. Martine L. Silje	Christina	Christina	Elise				
8	Ida	Christina	Helene	Goshia; Helene; Marita; Mona Lisa	Goshia	Ida					
9	Martine B.	Martine B.	Ida	Goshia; Helene; Marita; Mona Lisa	Helene; Martine B. Silje						
10	Sina	Helene	Goshia	Goshia; Helene; Marita; Mona Lisa	Helene; Martine B. Silje						
11	Marita	Sina	Mona Lisa	Goshia; Helene; Marita; Mona Lisa	Helene; Martine B. Silje						
12	Martine L.	Ida	Sina								
13	Christina	Thea	Sasha								

The contestant was eliminated
The contestant was disqualified from the competition
The contestant was put through collectively to the next round
The contestant was part of a non-elimination bottom four
The contestant quit the competition
The contestant won the competition

- In episode 1, the group of fifteen semi-finalists was whittled down to thirteen.
- In episode 3, Sasha was disqualified for refusing her makeover. She was replaced by Silje.
- In episode 4, only Goshia, Helene, Marita and Mona Lisa were in danger of elimination due to their inappropriate behaviour earlier in the week. However, none of them were eliminated.
- In episode 12, Frøydis decided to leave the competition for health reasons during the elimination ceremony. As a result, neither of the remaining girls were eliminated.

=== Photo Shoot Guide ===
- Episode 1 Photoshoot: Sexy in Dirt
- Episode 2 Photoshoot: Group shot on stairs
- Episode 3 Photoshoot: Murderous Brides
- Episode 4 Photoshoot: Homeless Fashion
- Episode 5 Photoshoot: Moroccan Fashion
- Episode 6 Photoshoot: Dresses in the wind
- Episode 7 Photoshoot: Rendezvous with Hank von Helvetes
- Episode 8 Photoshoot: Fashion Walk on the Streets
- Episode 9 Photoshoot: Underwater Muses
- Episode 10 Photoshoot: Fashion Glasses
- Episode 11 Photoshoot: Sex and the City Glamour & Cosmopolitan Cover Shoot

=== Judges ===
- Vendela Kirsebom
- Jan Thomas
- Mariana Verkerk - catwalk coach
