= Sara Nicole Andersen =

Norwegian-Iranian model

- Born: November 2, 1992 (age 33); Tehran, Iran
- Height: 1.70 m (5 ft 7 in)
- Beauty pageant titleholder
- Title: Miss Universe Norway 2012
- Hair color: Black
- Eye color: Brown
- Major competitions: Miss Universe Norway 2012 (Winner); Miss Universe 2012 (Unplaced)

Sara Nicole Andersen (Persian: سارا نیکول اندرسون; born November 2, 1992, in Tehran) is a Norwegian-Iranian model and beauty pageant titleholder.

Andersen started modeling at age 13, and was crowned Miss Universe Norway 2012. She competed in the 2012 Miss Universe pageant, placing at the 22nd place out of 88. Sara Nicole Anderson moved from Iran to Norway (Notodden) at age 4, and in 2000 at age 8 from Turkey.

From 2012-2014 she dated Jaysuma 'Jays' Saidy, a sprinter of Gambian descent. As of 2019 she is married to Lars Ove Løseth, whom she met in 2015 and with whom she has a son (born 2016).

Awards and achievements
Preceded by Melinda Elvenes	Miss Universe Norway; 2012	Succeeded by Mari Chauhan
