= Elise Dalby =

Norwegian model

Elise Dalby Grønnesby
- Born: Elise Dalby Grønnesby; 17 December 1995 (age 30); Hamar, Norway
- Height: 183 cm (72 in)
- Beauty pageant titleholder
- Title: Miss Norway 2014
- Hair color: Blonde
- Eye color: Blue
- Major competitions: Miss Norway 2014 (Winner); Miss Universe 2014 (Unplaced)

Elise Dalby Grønnesby (born 17 December 1995 in Hamar, Norway) is a Norwegian model and beauty pageant titleholder who was crowned Miss Norway 2014 and represented her country at the Miss Universe 2014 pageant.

== Early life ==
Dalby is a model from Hamar, Norway. She has the longest hair in Miss Norway history. Her older brother (Andreas Dalby Grønnesby; born 16 July 1994 and died 22 July 2011) was one of the victims in the 2011 Norway attacks.

== Pageantry ==
=== Miss Norway 2014 ===
Dalby represented Hamar and was crowned Miss Norway 2014 on 28 June 2014. She received the crown from the previous winner, Mari Chauhan, who also came from Hamar.

=== Miss Universe 2014 ===
Dalby competed at the Miss Universe 2014 pageant but was unplaced.

Awards and achievements
Preceded by Mari Chauhan	Miss Norway; 2014	Succeeded by Martine Rødseth
