= Kirby Ann Basken =

Norwegian model

- Born: Kirby-Ann Katarina Basken; Lørenskog, Norway
- Occupations: Model, TV- personality, and writer
- Years active: 2004 -2007
- Modeling information
- Agency: W- Talent management

Kirby-Ann Katarina Basken is a Norwegian model and beauty pageant titleholder. She was born in Lørenskog, Norway to a Norwegian father and a Filipino mother. On April 9, 2007, she won the title of Miss Norway Universe 2007 and represented Norway in the Miss Universe 2007 pageant held in Mexico City in May 2007.

== Competition ==
Being of Filipino-Norwegian descent, she represented the Filipino community in Scandinavia in the Mutya ng Pilipinas 2006 pageant. She gained the title Mutya ng Pilipinas Asia-Pacific International together with three special awards: Best in Long Gown, Calayan Best Skin and Miss Philippine International Hairdressers Association (PIHA). She then represented the Philippines in the Miss Intercontinental pageant held in Nassau, Bahamas in October 2006, where she emerged among the top 12 semifinalists.

Kirby Ann Basken is the first Filipino-Norwegian to win the title of Frøken Norge. She is also the first Filipino-Norwegian to hold two national beauty titles in the span of one year.

== Modeling ==
Basken works as a professional model in Norway and abroad. She has appeared in Norwegian magazines such as Cosmopolitan, Mag, Se og Hør and Her og Nå, and in Philippine magazines such as Mod, Metro, Candy, Chalk, People Asia, Status mag, and MEGA.

But it wasn't until Basken appeared on the front cover of FHM Norway's August edition in 2007, that she became widely known. Her cover was later on featured in FHM Australia's December 2007, edition, in FHM's Annual Issue "The Girls of FHM 2007", where she was among the 58 most beautiful women in the world.

In the 2008, "The Girls of FHM Special Collector's Edition" Basken was among the 33 sexiest and hottest women in the world.

== Hosting ==
In 2007, Basken began her hosting career working as a TV host for Sonen (TV2 Zebra), and as a radio host for "Tining Pinoy" (The Voice of Filipinos). She also worked as a briefcase lady in Norway's Deal or No Deal and as a VJ for the interactive show "MessTv" (TVNorge) in 2011.

In May 2011, Basken worked as a co-host for the gameshow "R U Kidding Me? (Owws? Hindi nga?!)" together with Vic Sotto.

Then in December 2011, Basken reunited with the Mutya ng Pilipinas organization as an anchor host for the Mutya ng Pilipinas 2011 pageant.

Preceded by Martine Jonassen	Miss Norway Universe; 2006 2007	Succeeded by Mariann Birkedal
