= Eli Landa =

Norwegian model

- Born: Eli Landa; 21 March 1984 (age 42); Sandnes, Norway
- Height: 1.76 m (5 ft 9 1/2 in)
- Beauty pageant titleholder
- Title: Frøken Norge Universe 2009
- Hair color: Brown
- Eye color: Green
- Major competitions: Årets Ansikt 2003 (finalist), New Silk Road Model Look 2003, Frøken Norge 2009 (WINNER), Miss Universe 2009

Eli Landa (born 21 March 1984 in Sandnes, Norway, currently living in Stavanger) is a Norwegian model, bank employee, teacher and beauty pageant titleholder. She studied at the University of Stavanger who was crowned Frøken Norge Universe 2009 (Miss Norway Universe 2009) on 28 March 2009. The winner of the Frøken Norge World title was Sara Skjoldnes from Skien.

Landa travelled to the Bahamas to represent Norway in Miss Universe 2009, where Miss Universe 2008, Dayana Mendoza of Venezuela, crowned her successor, Stefanía Fernández, also from Venezuela, on 23 August 2009. Landa was not among the Top 15 semi-finalists.

Previously, she has competed in a Norwegian model contest called Årets Ansikt (Face of the Year) in 2003 where she was a finalist, and New Silk Road Model Look 2003 in Hangzhou, China.

Preceded by Mariann Birkedal	Miss Norway Universe; 2009	Succeeded by Melinda Elvenes
