= Miss Norway =

Beauty pageant

Miss Norway Organization
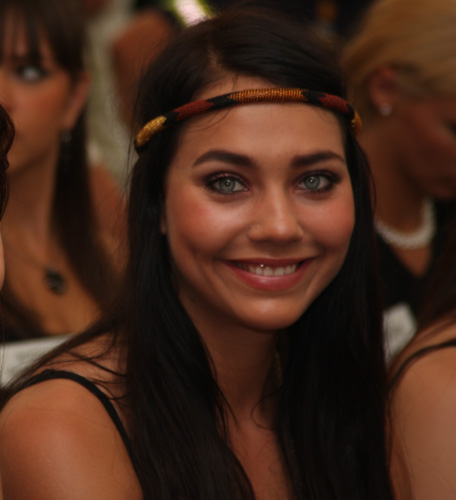
- Lene Egeli, Miss Norway 2008
- Formation: 1950; 76 years ago
- Purpose: Beauty pageant
- Headquarters: Oslo
- Location: Norway
- Official language: Norwegian
- President: Armand Bye
- Affiliations: Miss Universe; Miss World; Miss International; The Miss Globe; Miss Earth; Miss Supranational; Miss Grand International
- Website: www.missnorway.org

The Miss Norway (formerly known as "Frøken Norge") is a national beauty pageant in Norway The pageant was founded in 1950, where the winners were sent to Miss Universe.

== History ==
The Miss Norway was held for first time in 1950 by Dagbladet Magazine. There were no official Frøken Norge or Miss Norway titleholders from 1975 to 1982 during which Norwegian model agencies sent girls to international pageants. Since 1983 the pageant was run by Frøken Norge Corporation. In 2000 - 2010, the pageant was sponsored by TV2 Network.

Traditionally, the winner will get a chance to compete at Miss World pageant. Meanwhile, the runners-up will compete at Miss Universe, Miss International and Miss Europe. Sometimes the winner will be able to compete at the other pageants. In May 2012, a new concept called "Miss Universe Norway" was established by the company "Motivaction AS" after the application for the license for Miss Universe in Norway was approved.

From 1985 to 2011, "Frøken Norge" (registered trademark) with supervisor Geir Hamnes, sent candidates to Miss World and Miss Universe. From 1983 to 2008, "Miss Norway" (registered trademark) run by Geir Killingland, sent representatives to other beauty pageants such as Miss International, Miss Earth and others. After mr. Killingland died in 2009, his friends and family recovered "Miss Norway" in 2010, as a tribute to Killingland, and sent representatives to Miss Earth and Miss International that year.

In 2017 the Miss Norway selects representatives to compete in Miss Universe, Miss World, Miss International.

== Titleholders ==
Below are list of Frøken Norge, Miss Norway and Norske Miss Universe winners who represent their country at the Miss Universe, Miss World and Miss International pageants. On occasion, when the winner does not qualify (due to age), a runner-up is sent.

Year	Miss Norway	County	Notes
1933	Gudrun Hilditch Rygh	Nordland	
1934	Elsa Lindseth	—	
1935	Gerd Lowlie	Oslo	
1936	Aslaug Simensen	—	
1937	Lisbeth Grung	—	
1938	Else Hammer	—	
1950	Aud Grenes	Oslo	Frøken Norge — Dagbladet Magazine directorship
1952	Eva Røine	Oslo	
1953	Synnøve Gulbrandsen	Oslo	
1954	Mona Stornes	Oslo	
1955	Solveig Borstad	Oslo	
1957	Grete Lunder	Oslo	
1958	Greta Andersen	Oslo	Frøken Norge — Det Nye Magazine directorship
1959	Jorunn Kristjansen	Oslo	
1960	Ragnhild Aas	Oslo	
1961	Rigmor Trengereid	Oslo	Miss Norden 1961
1962	Beate Brevik Johansen	Oslo	
1963	Mette Stenstad	Oslo	Miss Europe 1963
1964	Jorunn Nystedt	Oslo	
1965	Britt Aaberg	Oslo	
1966	Siri Gro Nilsen	Oslo	
1967	Gro Goksør	Oslo	
1968	Tone Knaran	Oslo	Miss Scandinavia 1969
1969	Patricia Walker	Oslo	Frøken Norge — VG (Verdens Gang) directorship
1970	Vibeke Steineger	Hordaland	
1971	Ruby Reitan	Oslo	
1972	Liv Hanche Olsen	Oslo	
1973	Aina Walle	Oslo	Last Frøken Norge titleholders in 1970s and absent at Miss Universe 1974-1975
1975	Jenny Ottesen	Oslo	There were no official Frøken Norge titleholders from 1975 to 1982, during which Norwegian model agencies sent girls to international pageants
1976	Bente Lihaug	Oslo	
1977	Jeanette Aarum	Oslo	
1978	Unni Margret Øgland	Oslo	
1979	Heidi Louise Oiseth	Oslo	
1980	Maiken Nilesen	Oslo	
1981	Anita Nesbø	Akershus	
1982	Jeanett Krefting	Oslo	
1983	Karen Dobloug	Hedmark	Frøken Norge — Norwegian Models & Artists von Geir Killingland directorship
1984	Ingrid Marie Martens	Akershus	
1985	Karen Margrethe Moe	Vest-Agder	Frøken Norge — Geir Hamnes-TV 2 Network directorship
1986	Inger Louise Berg · Frøken Norge	Hedmark	
1986	Tone Henriksen · Miss Norway	Troms	
1987	Mette Veiseth · Frøken Norge	Nord-Trøndelag	
1987	Renate Bibow · Miss Norway	Hedmark	
1988	Bente Brunland · Frøken Norge	Oppland	
1988	Bright Hansen · Miss Norway	Nordland	
1989	Lene Ørnhoft · Frøken Norge	Akershus	
1989	Heidi Olsen · Miss Norway	Oslo	
1990	Mona Grudt · Norske Miss Universe	Nord-Trøndelag	Miss Universe 1990
1990	Ingeborg Kolseth · Frøken Norge	Oppland	
1990	Hege Christin Baardsen · Miss Norway	Rogaland	
1991	Lene Maria Pedersen · Norske Miss Universe	Troms	
1991	Anne-Britt Røvik · Frøken Norge	Møre og Romsdal	
1991	Julianne Skovli · Miss Norway	Østfold	
1992	Anne Sofie Galåen · Norske Miss Universe	Hedmark	
1992	Kjersti Brakestad · Frøken Norge	Sogn og Fjordane	
1992	Turid Sundet · Miss Norway	Møre og Romsdal	
1993	Ine Beate Strand · Norske Miss Universe	Buskerud	
1993	Rita Omvik · Frøken Norge	Hedmark	
1994	Caroline Sætre · Norske Miss Universe	Møre og Romsdal	
1994	Anne Lena Hansen · Frøken Norge	Troms	Miss International 1995
1994	Anne Vibeke Hoel · Miss Norway	Finnmark	
1995	Lena Sandvik · Norske Miss Universe	Østfold	
1995	Inger Lise Ebeltoft · Frøken Norge	Troms	
1995	Silje S. Syversen · Miss Norway	Vestfold	
1996	Eva Sjøholt · Frøken Norge	Troms	
1996	Thea Hokstad · Miss Norway	Sør-Trøndelag	
1997	Charlotte Høyåsen · Frøken Norge	Aust-Agder	
1997	Anne Mette Tveiten · Miss Norway	Vest-Agder	
1998	Stine Bergsvand · Norske Miss Universe	Telemark	
1998	Henriette Dankertsen · Frøken Norge	Akershus	
1998	Bjørg Sofie Løvstad · Miss Norway	Akershus	
1999	Anette Haukass	Buskerud	
2000	Stine Pedersen · Frøken Norge World	Rogaland	Run by TV2 Network
2000	Tonje Kristin Wøllo · Frøken Norge Universe	Buskerud	
2000	Line Hansen · Miss Norway	Nordland	
2001	Malin Johansen · Frøken Norge	Troms	
2001	Linda Marshall · Frøken Norge Universe	Buskerud	
2001	Siv Therese H. Haavik · Miss Norway	Rogaland	
2002	Kathrine Sørland · Frøken Norge	Rogaland	
2002	Hege Hatlo · Frøken Norge Universe	Rogaland	
2002	Linn N. Olaisen · Miss Norway	Troms	
2003	Elizabeth Wathne · Frøken Norge	Vest-Agder	
2003	Hanne-Karine Sørby· Frøken Norge Universe	Telemark	
2003	Marna Haugen · Miss Norway	Møre og Romsdal	
2004	Hege Tørresdal · Frøken Norge	Rogaland	
2004	Helene Tråsavik · Frøken Norge Universe	Rogaland	
2004	Jeanette Ersdal · Miss Norway	Vest-Agder	
2005	Caroline N. Nakken	Hordaland	
2006	Tonje Elise Skjærvik · Frøken Norge	Sør-Trøndelag	
2006	Martine Jonasen · Frøken Norge Universe	Vestfold	
2006	Linn Andersen · Miss Norway	Hordaland	
2007	Lisa-Mari Moen Jünge · Frøken Norge World	Møre og Romsdal	
2007	Kirby Ann Basken · Frøken Norge	Akershus	
2007	Caroline M. Kleven · Miss Norway	Telemark	
2008	Lene Egeli · Frøken Norge	Rogaland	
2008	Beatrice M. Delas · Miss Norway	Østfold	
2009	Sara Skjoldnes · Frøken Norge World	Telemark	
2009	Rogaland		
2010	Melinda Elvenes · Frøken Norge Universe	Vestfold	
2010	Mariann Birkedal · Frøken Norge World	Rogaland	
2010	Iman Kerigo · Miss Norway	Akershus	
2011	Ana Zahl	Nordland	There was no winner crowned for Miss Universe in 2011, as the final was held too late to send the winner to the 2011 edition of the pageant
2012	Sara Nicole Andersen	Oslo	Miss Norway Organization — Armand Bye directorship
2013	Mari Chauhan	Hedmark	
2014	Elise Dalby	Hedmark	
2015	Martine Rødseth	Hedmark	
2016	Christina Waage	Akershus	
2017	Kaja Kojan	Akershus	
2018	Susanne Guttorm	Finnmark	
2019	Helene Abildsnes	Vest-Agder	
2020	Sunniva Høiåsen Frigstad	Agder	
2021	Nora Emilie Nakken	Trondheim	
2022	Ida Anette Hauan	Trondheim	
2023	Julie Marie Tollefsen	Oslo	
2024	Lilly Sødal	Kristiansand	
2025	Leonora Lysglimt-Rødland	Osho	
2026	Abelone Smedsrud	Eiker og Drammen	

== Titleholders under Miss Norway org. ==
=== Miss Universe Norway ===
- : Declared as Winner
- : Ended as runner-up or top 5/6 qualification
- : Ended as one of the finalists or semifinalists
- : Ended as special awards winner

The winner of Miss Universe Norway represents her country at the Miss Universe. On occasion, when the winner does not qualify (due to age), a runner-up is sent. Norway sent its first Miss Universe representative to the first Miss Universe pageant in 1952. Norway has won Miss Universe once, Mona Grudt in 1990.

Year	County	Miss Universe Norway	Placement at Miss Universe	Special Award(s)	Notes
2026	Buskerud	Abelone Smedsrud	TBA		
2025	Oslo	Leonora Lysglimt-Rødland	Unplaced		Later Miss Cosmo Norway 2026.
2024	Agder	Lilly Sødal	Unplaced		
2023	Oslo	Julie Tollefsen	Unplaced		
2022	Trøndelag	Ida Anette Hauan	Did not compete		Withdrew several hours before the coronation night after testing positive for COVID-19.
2021	Trøndelag	Nora Emilie Nakken	Unplaced		
2020	Agder	Sunniva Frigstad	Unplaced		
2019	Vest-Agder	Helene Abildsnes	Unplaced		
2018	Finnmark	Susanne Guttorm	Unplaced		
2017	Akershus	Kaja Kojan	Unplaced		
2016	Akershus	Christina Waage	Unplaced		
2015	Hedmark	Martine Rødseth	Unplaced		
2014	Hedmark	Elise Dalby	Unplaced		
2013	Hedmark	Mari Chauhan	Unplaced		
2012	Oslo	Sara Nicole Andersen	Unplaced		
Frøken Norge
2011	Did not compete				
2010	Vestfold	Melinda Elvenes	Unplaced		
2009	Rogaland	Eli Landa	Unplaced		
2008	Rogaland	Mariann Birkedal	Unplaced		
2007	Akershus	Kirby Ann Basken	Unplaced		
2006	Vestfold	Martine Jonassen	Unplaced		
2005	Rogaland	Helene Tråsavik	Top 15		
2004	Rogaland	Kathrine Sørland	Top 15		
2003	Telemark	Hanne-Karine Sørby	Unplaced		
2002	Akershus	Hege Hatlo	Unplaced		
2001	Buskerud	Linda Marshall	Unplaced		
2000	Buskerud	Tonje Kristin Wøllo	Unplaced		
Norske Miss Universe
1999	Did not compete				
1998	Telemark	Stine Bergsvand	Unplaced		
1997	Did not compete				
1996	Troms	Inger Lise Ebeltoft	Unplaced		
1995	Østfold	Lena Sandvik	Unplaced		
1994	Møre og Romsdal	Caroline Sætre	Unplaced		
1993	Buskerud	Ine Beate Strand	Unplaced	Best National Costume	
1992	Hedmark	Anne Sofie Galåen	Unplaced		
1991	Troms	Lene Maria Pedersen	Unplaced		
1990	Nord-Trøndelag	Mona Grudt	Miss Universe 1990		
Frøken Norge
1989	Akershus	Lene Ørnhoft	Unplaced		
1988	Oppland	Bente Brunland	Top 10		
1987	Akershus	Mariann Leines	Unplaced		
1986	Troms	Tone Henriksen	Unplaced		
1985	Vest-Agder	Karen Margrethe Moe	Unplaced		
1984	Akershus	Ingrid Marie Martens	Unplaced		
1983	Hedmark	Karen Elisabeth Dobloug	Top 12		
1982	Oslo	Jeanette Krefting	Unplaced		
1981	Oslo	Mona Olsen	Top 12		
1980	Oslo	Maiken Nielsen	Unplaced		
1979	Oslo	Unni Margrethe Øglænd	Unplaced		
1978	Oslo	Jeanette Aarum	Unplaced		
1977	Oslo	Åshild Ottesen	Unplaced		
1976	Oslo	Bente Lihaug	Top 12		
Did not compete between 1974—1975
1973	Oslo	Aina Walle	2nd Runner-up		
1972	Oslo	Liv Hanche Olsen	Unplaced		
1971	Oslo	Ruby Reitan	Unplaced		
1970	Hordaland	Vibeke Steineger	Unplaced		
1969	Oslo	Patricia Walker	Top 15		
1968	Oslo	Tone Knaran	Top 15		
1967	Oslo	Gro Goksør	Unplaced		
1966	Oslo	Siri Gro Nilsen	Top 15		
1965	Oslo	Britt Aaberg	Unplaced		
1964	Oslo	Jorunn Nystedt	Top 10		
1963	—	Eva Carlberg	Unplaced		
1962	Rogaland	Julie Ege	Unplaced		
1961	Oslo	Rigmor Trengereid	Unplaced		
1960	Oslo	Ragnhild Aas	Top 15		
1959	Oslo	Jorunn Kristjansen	1st Runner-up		
1958	Oslo	Greta Andersen	Unplaced		
Did not compete between 1956—1957
1955	Oslo	Solveig Borstad	Top 15		
1954	Oslo	Mona Stornes	Top 16		
1953	Oslo	Synnøve Gulbrandsen	Top 16		
1952	Oslo	Eva Røine	Unplaced		

=== Miss World Norway ===
- : Declared as Winner
- : Ended as runner-up or top 5/6 qualification
- : Ended as one of the finalists or semifinalists
- : Ended as special awards winner

Miss Norway represents her country at the Miss World. In 2012 the Miss Norway recovered its foundation into the Miss Universe Norway Organization by Armand By. Started in 2017 the Miss World franchise returned to Miss Norway since 2013 the Norwegian representatives at Miss World were all designated.

Year	County	Miss World Norway	Placement at Miss World	Special Award(s)
2025	Did not compete			
2023	Agder	Andrea Farias	Unplaced	
2022	Miss World 2021 was rescheduled to 16 March 2022 due to the COVID-19 pandemic outbreak in Puerto Rico, no edition started in 2022			
2021	Viken	Amine Storrød	Unplaced	Miss World Talent (1st Runner-up); Miss World Sport (Top 32)
Did not compete between 2019—2021
2018	Oslo	Madelen Michelsen	Unplaced	
2017	Buskerud	Celine Herregården	Unplaced	
Miss World Norway — official selection
2016	Did not compete			
2015	Oslo	Fay Teresa Vålbekk	Unplaced	
2014	Hedmark	Monica Pedersen	Unplaced	
2013	Oslo	Alexandra Backstrom	Unplaced	
2012	Nordland	Karoline Olsen	Unplaced	
Norwegian Representatives from Frøken Norge
2011	Rogaland	Anna Zahl	Unplaced	
2010	Rogaland	Mariann Birkedal	Top 7	Miss World Top Model
2009	Telemark	Sara Skjoldnes	Unplaced	
2008	Rogaland	Lene Egeli	Unplaced	
2007	Møre og Romsdal	Lisa-Mari Moen Jünge	Unplaced	
2006	Sør-Trøndelag	Tonje Elise Skjærvik	Unplaced	
2005	Rogaland	Helene Tråsavik	Unplaced	
2004	Rogaland	Hege Torresdal	Unplaced	
2003	Vest-Agder	Elisabeth Wathne	Top 20	
2002	Rogaland	Kathrine Sørland	Top 5	
2001	Troms	Malin Johansen	Unplaced	
2000	Rogaland	Stine Pedersen	Unplaced	
1999	Buskerud	Anette Haukaas	Top 10	
1998	Did not compete			
1997	Aust-Agder	Charlotte Høiåsen	Unplaced	
1996	Troms	Eva Sjøholt	Unplaced	
1995	Troms	Inger Lise Ebeltoft	Unplaced	
1994	Troms	Anne Lena Hansen	Unplaced	
1993	Hedmark	Rita Omvik	Unplaced	
1992	Sogn og Fjordane	Kjersti Brakestad	Unplaced	
1991	Møre og Romsdal	Anne-Britt Røvik	Unplaced	
1990	Oppland	Ingeborg Kolseth	Unplaced	
1989	Oppland	Bente Brunland	Top 16	
1988	Oslo	Rita Paulsen	Top 10	
1987	Nord-Trøndelag	Mette Veiseth	Unplaced	
1986	Hedmark	Inger Louise Berg	Unplaced	
1985	Vest-Agder	Karen Margrethe Moe	Unplaced	
1984	Akershus	Ingrid Maria Martens	Unplaced	
1983	Hedmark	Karen Elizabeth Dobloug	Unplaced	
1982	Oslo	Janett Carine Krefting	Unplaced	
1981	Akershus	Anita Nesbø	Unplaced	
1980	Oslo	Maiken Nielsen	Unplaced	
1979	Oslo	Jeannette Aarum	Unplaced	
1978	Trøndelag	Elisabet Klaeboe	Unplaced	
1977	Oslo	Jenny Ottesen	Unplaced	
1976	Oslo	Nina Kristine Rønneberg	Unplaced	
1975	Troms	Sissel Gulbrandsen	Unplaced	
1974	—	Torill Mariann Larsen	Top 15	
1973	Oslo	Wenche Steen	Unplaced	
1972	Buskerud	Ingeborg Sørensen	1st Runner-up	
1971	—	Kate Starvik	Unplaced	
1970	Akershus	Aud Fosse	Unplaced	
1969	Akershus	Kjersti Jortun	Top 7	
1968	—	Hedda Lie	Unplaced	
1967	Oslo	Vigdis Sollie	Unplaced	
1966	—	Birgit Andersen	Top 15	
Did not compete between 1961—1965
1960	—	Grethe Solhoy	Top 18	
1959	Oslo	Berit Grundvig	Unplaced	
1958	—	Åse Qjeldvik	Unplaced	
Did not compete between 1954—1957
1953	Oslo	Synnøve Gulbrandsen	Unplaced	

=== Miss International Norway ===
- : Declared as Winner
- : Ended as runner-up or top 5/6 qualification
- : Ended as one of the finalists or semifinalists
- : Ended as special awards winner

The Miss Norway winners came to Miss International. Began in 2014 a Runner-up of Miss Norway represents her country at Miss International. In Miss International, Norway has two Miss International winners such as Catherine Alexandra Gude in 1988 and Anne Lena Hansen in 1995.

Year	County	Miss International Norway	Placement at Miss International	Special Award(s)
2025	Østfold	Nikoline Andresen	Unplaced	
2024	Did not compete			
2023	Viken	Madeleine Malmberg	Unplaced	
2022	Aurskog-Høland	Romée Dahlen	Unplaced	
Due to the impact of COVID-19 pandemic, no competition held between 2020―2021
2019	Akershus	Henriette J. Hauge	Unplaced	Best Swimsuit (Top 15)
2018	Vest-Agder	Helene Abildnes	Did not compete	
2017	Vestfold	Vilde Andresen Bø	Unplaced	
2016	Trøndelag	Camilla Ellinor De Souza Devik	Unplaced	
2015	Østfold	Cecilie Andrea Røising	Unplaced	
2014	Vestfold	Thea Cecilie Nordal Bull	Unplaced	
Did not compete between 2011—2013
2010	Trøndelag	Marion Dyrvik	Unplaced	
2009	Østfold	Beatrice M. Delas	Unplaced	
2008	Møre og Romsdal	Lisa-Mari Moen Jünge	Unplaced	
2007	Did not compete			
2006	Hordaland	Linn Andersen	Unplaced	
2005	Hordaland	Caroline N. Nakken	Unplaced	
2004	Rogaland	Stephanie Eide Furguiel	Unplaced	
2003	—	Fay Larsen	Unplaced	
2002	Did not compete			
2001	Rogaland	Siv Therese H. Haavik	Unplaced	Miss Friendship
2000	—	Frida Agnethe Johnson	Unplaced	
1999	Buskerud	Anette Rusten	Unplaced	
1998	Akershus	Bjørg Sofie Lovstad	Unplaced	
Norwegian Representatives from Frøken Norge
1997	Did not compete			
1996	Oslo	Eva-Charlotte Stenset	Top 15	
1995	Troms	Anne Lena Hansen	Miss International 1995	
1994	Finnmark	Anne Vibeke Hoel	Unplaced	
1993	Did not compete			
1992	Hedmark	Rita Omvik	Top 15	
1991	Rogaland	Hege Cathrin Baardsen	Unplaced	
1990	Telemark	Hanne Thorsdalen	Top 15	
1989	Oslo	Heidi Olsen	Unplaced	
1988	Oppland	Catherine Alexandra Gude	Miss International 1988	
1987	—	Hege Elisabeth Rasmussen	Unplaced	
1986	Oslo	Annette Bjerke	Top 15	
1985	Østfold	Torunn Forsberg	Top 15	
1984	—	Monika Lien	Unplaced	
1983	Akershus	Christine Zeiner	Unplaced	
1982	—	Jeanette Roger Blixt	Unplaced	
1981	Oslo	Helen Holager	Unplaced	
1980	Oslo	Heidi Louise Oiseth	Unplaced	
1979	Oslo	Unni Margrethe Øglænd	Unplaced	
1978	Oslo	Jeanette Aarum	1st Runner-up	
1977	Oslo	Bente Lihaug	Top 13	
Did not compete between 1974—1976
1973	Oslo	Anne Katrine Ramstad	Unplaced	
1972	Oslo	Vigdis Thire	Unplaced	
1971	Oslo	May Lindstad	Top 15	
1970	Oslo	Tone Knaran	Top 15	
1969	Buskerud	Ingeborg Sørensen	Top 15	
1968	—	Hedda Lie	Unplaced	
Did not compete between 1966—1967
1965	—	Aud Jansen	Unplaced	
1964	—	Inger Sande	Unplaced	
1963	—	Martha Tunge	Unplaced	
1962	Oslo	Beate Brevik Johansen	Unplaced	
1961	Oslo	Åse Marie Schmedling	Top 15	
1960	—	Lise Hammer	Unplaced	

=== Miss Supranational Norway ===
- : Declared as Winner
- : Ended as runner-up or top 5/6 qualification
- : Ended as one of the finalists or semifinalists
- : Ended as special awards winner

Year	County	Miss Supranational Norway	Placement at Miss Supranational	Special Award(s)
Did not compete since 2022
2021	Viken	Ina Kollset	Unplaced	
Due to the impact of COVID-19 pandemic, no competition in 2020
Did not compete between 2018-2019
2017	Oslo	Yasmin Osee Aakre	Unplaced	
2016	Did not compete			
2015	Oslo	Sonia Singh	Unplaced	
2014	Oslo	Daniella Andersson	Unplaced	
2013	Østfold	Marie Virgenia Cecilie Molo Peter	Unplaced	
2012	Oslo	Marie Bogucka Selvik	Unplaced	

=== Miss Earth Norway ===
- : Declared as Winner
- : Ended as runner-up or top 5/6 qualification
- : Ended as one of the finalists or semifinalists
- : Ended as special awards winner

The Miss Norway franchised the Miss Earth competition until 2011. Since 2012 the name of Miss Earth Norway awarded to the winner of Miss Earth Norway (Casting). In 2018 the Miss Norway was almost successfully sending one of runners-up of Miss Norway to Miss Earth.

Year	County	Miss Earth Norway	Placement at Miss Earth	Special Award(s)
2025	Akershus	Julie Børresen	Unplaced	
2024	Agder	Selina Josefsen	Unplaced	
2023	Innlandet	Emilie Svendby	Unplaced	
2022	Agder	Lilly Sødal	Top 20	
2021	Viken	Madeline Denice Olsen	Unplaced	
2020	Oslo	Nora Emilie Nakken	Unplaced	
2019	Did not compete			
2018	Østfold	Ina Kollset	Did not compete	
Miss Earth Norway — Official Selection
Did not compete between 2016—2017
2015	Møre og Romsdal	Britt Roselyn Rekkedal	Unplaced	
2014	Did not compete			
2013	Oslo	Caroline Sparboe	Unplaced	
2012	Akershus	Nina Fjalestad	Unplaced	(silver) Sponsored Swimsuit Parade; (bronze) Swimsuit (Group 3); (bronze) Evening Gown (Group 3)
Norwegian Representatives from Miss Norway
2011	Trøndelag	Marion Dyrvik	Unplaced	
2010	Akershus	Iman Kerigo	Unplaced	
Did not compete between 2008—2009
2007	Hordaland	Margaret Paulin Hauge	Unplaced	
2006	Hordaland	Meriam Lerøy Brahimi	Unplaced	
2005	Østfold	Vibeke Hansen	Unplaced	
2004	Vest-Agder	Birgitte Korsvik	Top 16	
2003	Oslo	Fay Larsen	Top 10	
2002	Troms	Linn Olaisen	Unplaced	

=== Miss Grand Norway ===
- : Declared as Winner
- : Ended as runner-up or top 5/6 qualification
- : Ended as one of the finalists or semifinalists
- : Ended as special awards winner

Year	County	Miss Grand Norway	Placement at Miss Grand International	Special Award(s)
Did not compete since 2025
2024	Viken	Madeleine Malmberg	Unplaced	
Did not compete between 2019-2023
2018	Oslo	Maria Barbantonis	Unplaced	
Did not compete 2017
2016	Stavanger	Yasmin Osee Aakre	Unplaced	
2015	Oslo	Sonia Singh	Unplaced	
2014	Asker	Caroline Munthe	Unplaced	
2013	Flekkefjord	Christine Frestad	Unplaced	

== Disqualified contestants ==
According to the Miss Norway regulations, candidates must not have been pictured naked in a commercial production or publication.

In 2004, contestant Aylar Lie was disqualified from the contest when it was found she had appeared in many pornographic movies.
