= Lene Egeli =

Norwegian model

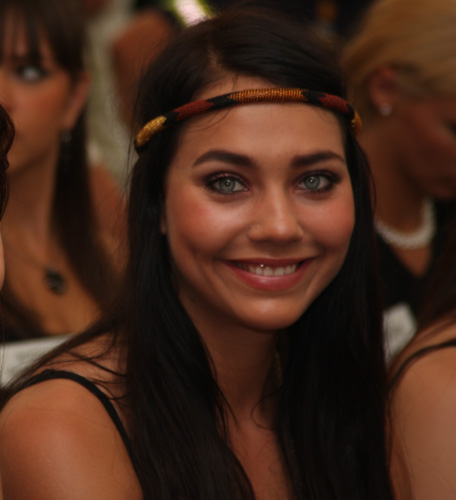
- Egeli in 2008
- Born: Lene Egeli; 27 March 1987 (age 38); Stavanger, Norway
- Beauty pageant titleholder
- Title: Frøken Norge 2008

Lene Egeli (born 27 March 1987 in Stavanger, Norway) is a Norwegian model and beauty pageant titleholder who won Miss Norway 2008, on 21 April 2008. She went on to represent Norway in Miss World 2008 in Johannesburg, South Africa on 13 December 2008. She did not advance to the semi-final

Egeli competed in Norway's Next Top Model in 2006, and was the first runner-up; Årets Ansikt ("Face of the Year") in 2004, and was the second runner-up and the people's choice; and a modeling contest in China. She also made a television commercial for the American cosmetics company Revlon.

Egeli has worked as an assistant teacher and model.

Preceded by Lisa-Mari Moen Jünge	Miss Norway; 2008	Succeeded by Sara Skjoldnes
