= Nina Fjalestad =

Norwegian beauty pageant contestant

- Born: Nina Elise Fjalestad; 27 April 1993 (age 33); Asker, Norway
- Height: 1.72 m (5 ft 7 1/2 in)
- Beauty pageant titleholder
- Title: Miss Globe International 2011; Miss Earth Norway 2012
- Hair color: Light Brown
- Eye color: Brown
- Major competitions: Frøken Norge 2011 (finalist); Miss Globe International 2011 (winner); Miss Universe Norway 2012 (1st runner-up); Miss Earth 2012 (Unpalaced)

Nina Elise Fjalestad (born 27 April 1993 in Asker, Norway) is a Norwegian model, dancer and beauty pageant titleholder.

Nina was a finalist in Frøken Norge 2011, the Norwegian national preliminary for Miss World and Miss Universe. Later the same year she was chosen to represent Norway in the annual Miss Globe International pageant held in Northern Cyprus, which she won. On 28 September 2012, she competed in the finals of the newly created Miss Universe Norway pageant. She placed as the 1st runner-up, and therefore won the title of Miss Earth Norway 2012 and the rights to represent Norway in the Miss Earth 2012 pageant to be held on 24 November in the Philippines.

Fjalestad has also been active as a dancer in a group called VIVA Performance Couture. She went to Dønski upper secondary school in Bærum.
