= Frøken Norge 2008 =

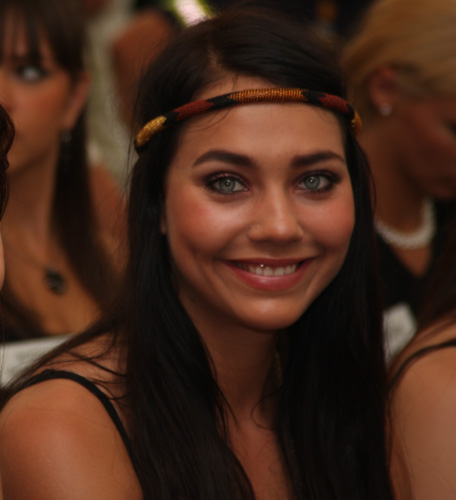
- Date: 20 April 2008
- Presenters: Vibeke Klemetsen
- Venue: Lillestrøm, Norway
- Broadcaster: TVNorge
- Entrants: 10
- Winner: Lene Egeli

The Frøken Norge 2008 beauty pageant was held in Lillestrøm, Norway on 20 April 2008. 10 finalists out of 2110 applicants were chosen after weeks of public voting to compete the final night, trying to win the coveted crown. All of the 10 finalists represented their hometown in the contest.

The eventual winner, Lene Egeli from Stavanger, a former Norway's Next Top Model runner-up, represented Norway in Miss World 2008 in South Africa.

== Final results ==
Final results	Contestant
Frøken Norge 2008	Stavanger – Lene Egeli
1st Runner-up	Stavanger – Mariann Birkedal
2nd Runner-up	Bardufoss – Lena Bjørnås
Top 10 finalists	Bergen – Julia Iversen; Kolbotn – Line Rasch Rogne; Lørenskog – Jeanett Paulsen; Narvik – Hanne Sagstuen; Oslo – Farsaneh Davodi; Stavanger – Cecilie Helen Eide; Ulsteinvik – Tonje Garvik

== Judges ==
- Kristin Spitznogle (psychologist/sexologist)
- Camilla Feranley (choreographer)
- Per Heimly (photographer)
- Daniel Hamnes (TV host and son of the National Director Geir Hamnes)
- Stig Kjos (the Norwegian Bachelor 2008)
- Christian August Stang (stylist)
- Alf Gunnar Sørby Nilsen (musician/TV presenter)
- Sigrid Bonde Tusvik (comedian)

== Notes ==
- Originally, Lisa-Mari Moen Jünge was chosen to represent Norway in Miss Universe 2008, but since she already had crowned her successor, Lene Egeli, the Miss Universe Organization declared that they would not accept her as a contestant. Therefore, a special pageant was held, called Norske Miss Universe 2008 (Norwegian Miss Universe 2008), where all of the finalists (except for the winner Lene Egeli) of Frøken Norge 2008, in addition to Christine Ruste Hinna from Hønefoss who was the closest to reach the Top 10 of Frøken Norge 2008, competed. Mariann Birkedal, 1st Runner-up of Frøken Norge 2008, won the contest and went on to compete in Miss Universe 2008 in Vietnam.
