= Toril Charlotte Ulleberg Reynolds =

Norwegian politician (born 1987)

Toril Charlotte Ulleberg Reynolds (born 1987) is a Norwegian politician for the Progress Party.

She was appointed to Solberg's Cabinet in November 2015, when she became a political adviser for Ketil Solvik-Olsen in the Ministry of Transport. From August to October 2016 she was an acting State Secretary in the same ministry. She was then appointed State Secretary in the Ministry of Justice and Public Security in December 2016, having an absence of leave from October 2017, and then changing to the Ministry of Petroleum and Energy in 2018. In January 2019 she changed back to the Ministry of Justice and Public Security, this time as State Secretary for Minister of Public Security Ingvil Smines Tybring-Gjedde. Reynolds left Solberg's Cabinet together with the rest of the Progress Party in January 2020.

She hails from Årnes. Before taking the surname Reynolds she was a participant in the first season of Top Model in Norway, which was televised in 2006, and participated in the beauty pageant Frøken Norge 2008. She studied law at the University of Oslo, graduating in 2013.
