= Miss Universe 1990 =

- Date: 15 April 1990
- Presenters: Dick Clark; Leeza Gibbons; Margaret Gardiner
- Venue: Shubert Theatre, Los Angeles, California, United States
- Broadcaster: CBS; KCBS-TV
- Director: Tony Charmoli
- Producer: Sid Smith
- Entrants: 71
- Placements: 10
- Debuts: Soviet Union
- Withdrawals: Belgium; Brazil; Curaçao; Haiti; Lebanon; Luxembourg; New Zealand; United States Virgin Islands
- Returns: Czechoslovakia
- Winner: Mona Grudt; Norway
- Congeniality: Christiane Stocker (West Germany)
- Best National Costume: Lizeth Mahecha (Colombia)
- Photogenic: Passaraporn Chaimongkol (Thailand)

Miss Universe 1990, the 39th Miss Universe pageant, was held at the Shubert Theatre in Los Angeles, California, United States, on April 15, 1990.

At the end of the event, Angela Visser of Holland crowned Mona Grudt of Norway as Miss Universe 1990. Seventy-one contestants competed for the title.

== Results ==
=== Placements ===
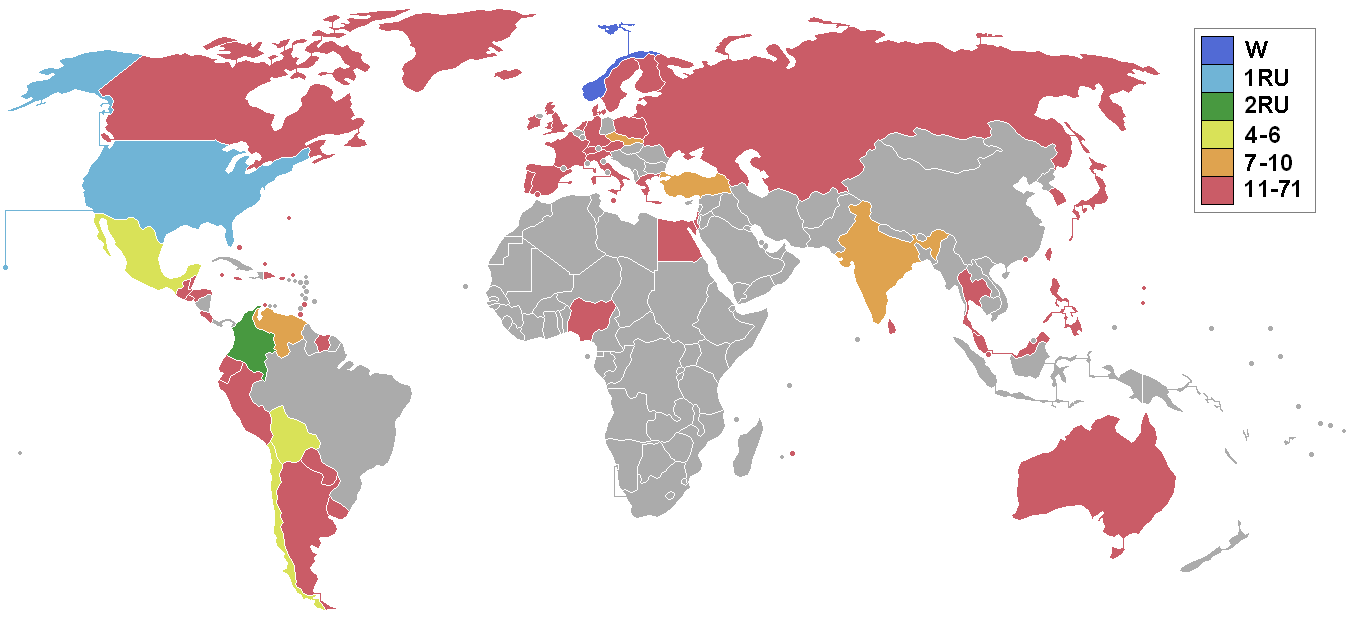
Final placements for Miss Universe 1990

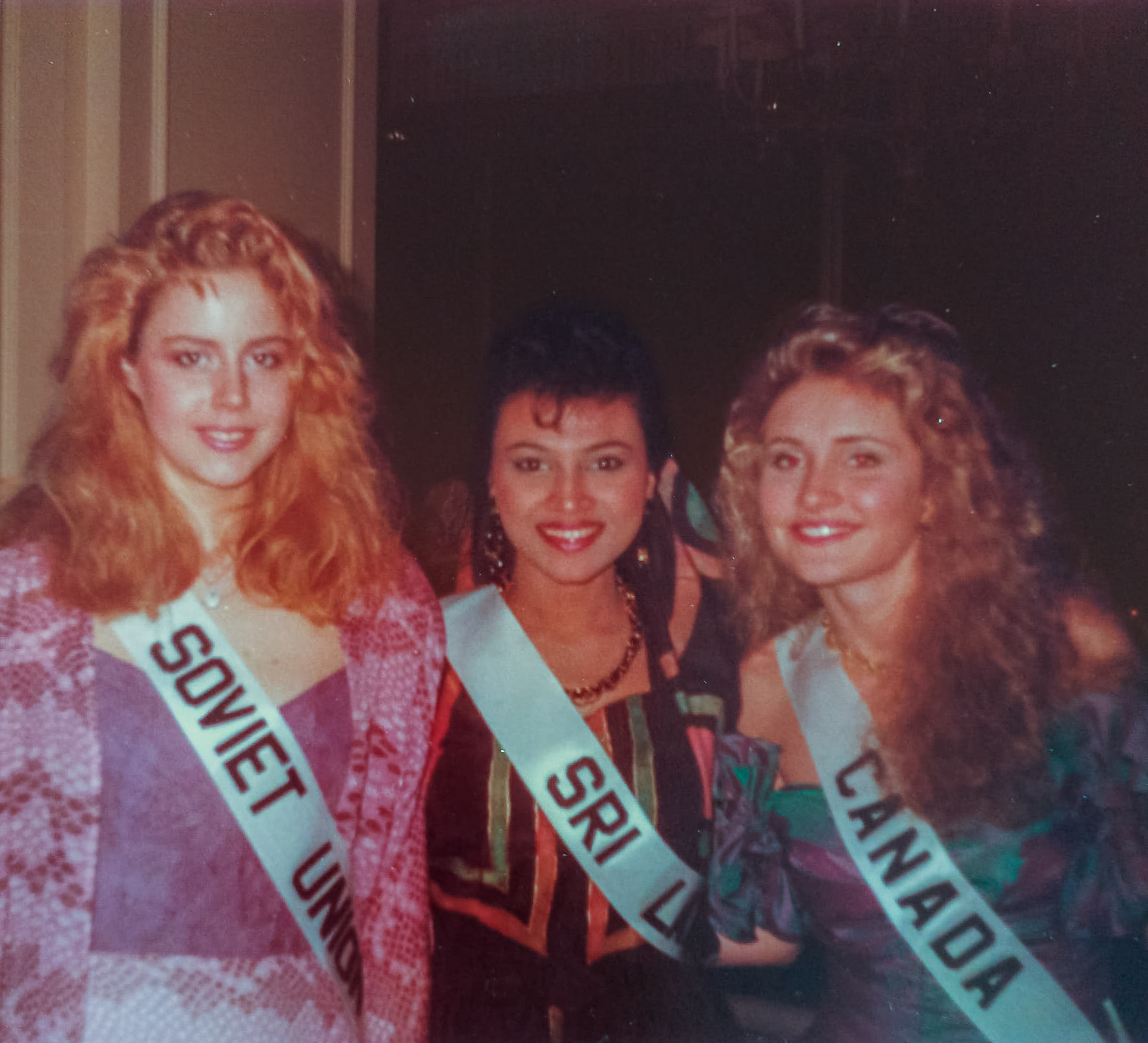
Miss Soviet Union, Sri Lanka and Canada during Miss Universe 1990.

Placement	Contestant
Miss Universe 1990	Norway – Mona Grudt
1st Runner-Up	United States – Carole Gist
2nd Runner-Up	Colombia – Lizeth Mahecha
Top 6	Bolivia – Rosario Rico Toro; Chile – Uranía Haltenhoff; Mexico – Marilé del Rosario
Top 10	Czechoslovakia – Jana Hronková; India – Suzanne Sablok; Turkey – Jülide Ateş; Venezuela – Andreína Goetz

=== Final Competition ===
Nation	Preliminary Average	Interview	Swimsuit	Evening Gown	Semifinal Average
Norway	8.683 (1)	8.760 (1)	8.922 (1)	8.989 (1)	8.890 (1)
United States	8.316 (3)	8.509 (3)	8.299 (7)	8.630 (5)	8.479 (6)
Colombia	8.313 (5)	8.610 (2)	8.714 (2)	8.840 (2)	8.721 (2)
Mexico	8.316 (3)	8.500 (4)	8.450 (4)	8.707 (4)	8.552 (3)
Chile	8.206 (9)	8.411 (6)	8.410 (6)	8.770 (3)	8.530 (4)
Bolivia	8.256 (7)	8.439 (5)	8.498 (3)	8.600 (6)	8.512 (5)
Venezuela	8.420 (2)	8.370 (7)	8.450 (4)	8.590 (7)	8.470 (7)
India	8.280 (6)	8.200 (9)	8.233 (8)	8.552 (8)	8.328 (8)
Turkey	8.090 (10)	8.079 (10)	8.139 (9)	8.200 (9)	8.139 (9)
Czechoslovakia	8.210 (8)	8.360 (8)	7.785 (10)	7.970 (10)	8.038 (10)

=== Special awards ===
Special award	Contestant
Miss Amity	West Germany – Christiane Stocker
Miss Photogenic	Thailand – Pasaraporn Chaimongkol
Best National Costume	Colombia – Lizeth Mahecha

== Contestants ==
- Argentina – Paola de la Torre
- Aruba – Gwendolyne Kwidama
- Australia – Charmaine Ware
- Austria – Sandra Luttenberger
- Bahamas – Lisa Nichelle Sawyer
- Belize – Ysela Antonia Zabaneh
- Bermuda – Janet Tucker
- Bolivia – Rosario del Pilar Rico Toro
- British Virgin Islands – Jestina Hodge
- Canada – Robin Lee Ouzunoff
- Cayman Islands – Tricia Rose Whittaker
- Chile – Uranía Haltenhoff
- Colombia – Lizeth Mahecha
- Costa Rica – Julieta Posla
- Czechoslovakia – Jana Hronkova
- Denmark – Maj-Britt Jensen
- Dominican Republic – Rosario Rodríguez
- Ecuador – Jessica Núñez
- Egypt – Dalia El Behery
- El Salvador – Gracia María Guerra
- England – Carla Barrow
- Finland – Tiina Susanna Vierto
- France – Gaëlle Voiry
- Gibraltar – Audrey Gingell
- Greece – Jeni Balatsinou
- Greenland – Sascha Nukaka Motzfeldt
- Guam – Marcia Damian
- Guatemala – Marianela Abate
- Holland – Stephanie Halenbeek
- Honduras – Vivian Moreno
- Hong Kong – Monica Chan
- Iceland – Hildur Dungalsdóttir
- India – Suzanne Sablok
- Ireland – Barbara Curran
- Israel – Yvonna Krugliak
- Italy – Annamaria Malipiero
- Jamaica – Michelle Hall
- Japan – Hiroko Miyoshi
- Malaysia – Anna Lin Lim
- Malta – Charmaine Farrugia
- Mauritius – Anita Ramgutty
- Mexico – Marilé del Rosario Santiago
- Nigeria – Sabina Umeh
- Northern Mariana Islands – Edwina Menzies
- Norway – Mona Grudt
- Paraguay – Mónica Plate
- Peru – Marisol Martínez
- Philippines – Germelina Leah Banal Padilla
- Poland – Małgorzata Obieżalska
- Portugal – Maria Rosado
- Puerto Rico – María Luisa Fortuño
- Republic of China – Wen Tzui Pin
- Saint Vincent and the Grenadines – Glenor Browne
- Scotland – Karina Ferguson
- Singapore – Ong Lay Ling
- South Korea – Oh Hyun-kyung
- Soviet Union – Evia Stalbovska
- Spain – Raquel Revuelta
- Sri Lanka – Roshani Aluwinare
- Suriname – Saskia Sibilo
- Sweden – Linda Isaksson
- Switzerland – Catherine Mesot
- Thailand – Passaraporn Chaimongkol
- Trinidad and Tobago – Maryse de Gourville
- Turkey – Jülide Ateş
- Turks and Caicos Islands – Karen Been
- United States – Carole Gist
- Uruguay – Ondina Pérez
- Venezuela – Andreína Goetz
- Wales – Jane Lloyd
- West Germany – Christiane Stocker

=== Order of Introduction ===
This year followed the pageant in the year before that the Parade of Nations segment was presented by introducing the delegates, designated in the regional groups. However, the delegates were also talking about their plans for the future and telling their names.

Geographical Region / Continent	Order of Country / Territory Introduction
Central and North America	Belize; Mexico; Canada; Costa Rica; Honduras; Greenland; Guatemala; El Salvador; United States
Asia and The Land Down Under	Singapore; Republic of China; Malaysia; Sri Lanka; Hong Kong; Japan; South Korea; India; Philippines; Thailand; Australia
British Isles and Western Europe	Holland; Scotland; Denmark; Norway; Wales; Portugal; France; Iceland; Switzerland; England; Ireland; Finland; Sweden; West Germany; Austria
Eastern Europe	Poland; Soviet Union; Czechoslovakia
South America	Argentina; Chile; Bolivia; Venezuela; Paraguay; Ecuador; Suriname; Colombia; Peru; Uruguay
The Islands	Saint Vincent and the Grenadines; Trinidad and Tobago; Northern Mariana Islands; Guam; Mauritius; Turks and Caicos Islands; Dominican Republic; Bahamas; Cayman Islands; Puerto Rico; Aruba; British Virgin Islands; Jamaica; Bermuda
Mediterranean, Middle East, and Africa	Italy; Egypt; Malta; Turkey; Greece; Spain; Israel; Gibraltar; Nigeria

== Notes ==
=== Debuts ===
- Soviet Union – Evia Staļbovska was one of the 17 semi-finalists in the 1989 Miss USSR pageant. Staļbovska was from Riga in Latvia.

=== Returns ===
Last competed in 1970:

- Czechoslovakia

=== Withdrawals ===
- Belgium – Miss Belgium 1990, Katia Alens had completed Miss International 1990 and Miss World 1990. Miss Belgium Organization did not send at representative this year. Katia Alens later participated in Miss Universe 1991.
- Brazil – Due the franchise owner withdrawal, no national contest held.
- Curaçao
- Cyprus
- Gambia
- Ghana
- Haiti
- Luxembourg – Beata Jarzynska
- Kenya
- Namibia
- New Zealand
- Panama – Gloria Stella Quintana, she was unable to travel to Miss Universe because the country was still affected by the American invasion of December 1989.
- Papua New Guinea
- Senegal
- United States Virgin Islands
- Yugoslavia – Dragana Živić, Due lack of Sponsorship and visa issues.
