= Bjørn Opsahl =

Norwegian photographer, director and lecturer (1968–2025)

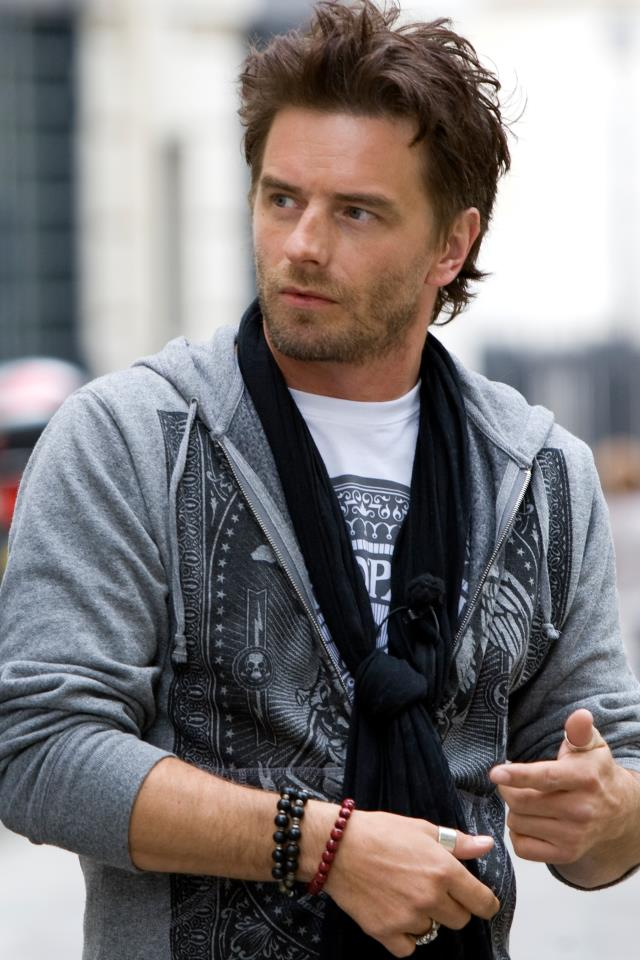
- Opsahl i 2007
- Died: 27 February 2025
- Occupation: Photographer

Bjorn Opsahl (10 August 1968 – 27 February 2025) was a Norwegian photographer, director and lecturer from Oslo. Opsahl debuted as a visual artist with the exhibition "Deadscapes" in 2005 at the Henie Onstad Art Centre, and followed up with "Ask the Dust" on Stenersen Museum in 2009.

== Life and career ==
Opsahl was a photographer and judge on Norway's Next Top Model (season 4 & 5, all episodes) and Sweden's Next Top Model (season 4, episode 10). He was also the judge and photographer for all episodes of Norway's Miss Universe pageant in 2005. After moving to Los Angeles in 2008, he participated in the tattoo artist Kat Von D's television show LA Ink (Season 3, episode 13).

Opsahl taught photography and directing at Nordic School of Photography in Oslo, and has held a number of workshops and lectures around the country since 2005. In 2011, he started working with the Scandinavian talk show Skavlan, which ended in autumn 2014 with a book and exhibitions in Oslo and Stockholm. Opsahl portrayed Skavlan's guests backstage, and has worked with international celebrities such as Lionel Richie, Sir Ben Kingsley, Noel Gallagher, Petter Stordalen, Dave Grohl, Bruno Mars and Justin Bieber.

His photos are published in international magazines such as Rolling Stone, Financial Times, Elle and Cosmopolitan.

Opsahl had no formal photography training, either from school or as an assistant. He started as a roadie for various festivals and rock concerts. During a lunch break from work job, he went to the local convenience store to buy a sausage and five lottery tickets. He won 25,000 NOK (approximately US$5,000) and left directly for Stockholm to party. Arriving home a few days later, he had also been bought his first camera.

In 2010, he was the wedding photographer when the Norwegian Forbes-billionaire Petter Stordalen married the environmental activist Gunhild Anker Stordalen to the tune of US$5 million in Marrakech.

Bjorn Opsahl also worked as a director of commercials and music videos.

Opsahl was a friend of legendary photographer Anton Corbijn and took Corbijn's current press photos.

Opsahl took his own life on 27 February 2025, at the age of 56.

== Exhibitions ==
=== Solo ===
- 1995: Björk — Venice/Stockholm – Barbeint, Oslo
- 2005: Deadscapes — Henie-Onstad Art Centre, Bærum
- 2009: Ask the Dust — Stenersen Museum, Oslo
- 2012: Black Eye — Nordic Light International Festival of Photography, Kristiansund

=== Collective ===
- 1996: Trikkehallene i Oslo — Tinagent's Arena 18:39
- 1998: Kuba i Oslo — Tinagent's Arena 1998
- 1998: Henie Onstad Kunstsenter — Christo Hommage
- 2002: Havnehallene, Oslo — KORK, 53 musikere møter 53 fotografer
- 2002: Quart-festivalen — Opsahl/Leardini
- 2003: T-banen, Oslo — Undereksponert
