= Mariann Birkedal =

Norwegian model

- Born: Mariann Birkedal; Stavanger, Norway
- Height: 1.74 m (5 ft 8 1/2 in)
- Beauty pageant titleholder
- Title: Norske Miss Universe 2008; Frøken Norge 2010
- Hair color: Brown
- Eye color: Blue/Green
- Major competitions: Frøken Norge 2008 (1st runner-up); Miss Universe 2008 (Unplaced); Frøken Norge 2010 (Winner); Miss World 2010 (Top 7) (Miss World Top Model)

Mariann Birkedal is a Norwegian model and beauty pageant titleholder who has represented Norway in Miss Universe 2008 and Miss World 2010.

== Miss Universe 2008 ==
After participating in Frøken Norge 2008 and placing first runner-up, she was selected in a separate competition to be her country's representative to the 2008 Miss Universe pageant held in Nha Trang, Vietnam on July 14, 2008.

== Miss World 2010 ==
Birkedal competed and won the 2010 Frøken Norge pageant celebrated in Noresund on June 26, gaining the right to represent Norway in Miss World 2010.

As the official representative of her country to the 2010 Miss World pageant, held in Sanya, China, she won the Miss World Top Model fast-track event on October 23, and automatically became one of the Top 25 semifinalists, the first Norwegian woman to place in Miss World since 2003.

Birkedal also placed third in both Miss World Beach Beauty and Miss World Sportswoman fast-track events of Miss World 2010, which made her the early bookies' favourite to win the contest. In the end, she finished in the Top 7.

There were some suggestions that Beijing might have pressured the judges to provide low scores for Birkedal, Miss Norway, because the Nobel Peace Prize was awarded to one of its political prisoners, Liu Xiaobo.

Awards and achievements
Preceded by (Mexico) Perla Beltrán	Miss World Top Model; 2010	Incumbent
Preceded by Sara Skjoldnes	Frøken Norge for Miss World; 2010	Incumbent
Preceded by Kirby Ann Basken	Frøken Norge for Miss Universe; 2007-2008	Succeeded by Eli Landa
