= Lizeth Mahecha =

Colombian lawyer and beauty queen

- Born: Lizeth Yamile Mahecha Arévalo; 6 December 1971 (age 54); Barranquilla, Atlantico, Colombia
- Height: 5 ft 9 in (1.75 m)
- Children: 2
- Beauty pageant titleholder
- Title: Miss Atlantico 1989; Miss Colombia 1989
- Hair color: Light Brown
- Eye color: Brown
- Major competitions: Miss Colombia 1989 (Winner); Miss Universe 1990 (2nd Runner-Up)

Lizeth Yamile Mahecha Arévalo (December 6, 1971) is a Colombian lawyer and beauty pageant titleholder who was crowned Miss Colombia 1989 and competed at Miss Universe 1990 where she placed 2nd runner-up.
