= Mona Grudt =

Norwegian editor and model (born 1969)

- Born: 6 April 1971 (age 55); Stjørdal Municipality, Norway
- Spouses: Lasse Berre (m. 1995; div. 1999) Brody Bittrick (m. 2005; div. 2012)
- Children: 3
- Beauty pageant titleholder
- Title: Miss Norway 1990; Miss Universe 1990
- Hair color: Light Brown
- Eye color: Blue
- Major competitions: Miss Norway 1990 (Winner); Miss Universe 1990 (Winner)

Mona Grudt (born 6 April 1971) is a Norwegian tv host, model, editor and beauty queen who was crowned Miss Universe 1990. She is so far the only Norwegian to win the Miss Universe title.

== Miss Universe ==
Grudt became the clear favorite of the judges, winning the interview and swimsuit preliminaries and all three segments of the semi-finals. During the 1990 Miss Universe competition, she listed herself as "The beauty queen from Hell" as a publicity stunt (because she was born in the village of Hell, located in Stjørdal Municipality, Norway; however 'hell' also means 'luck' in Norwegian). Her runners-up were Carole Gist and Lizeth Mahecha, representing United States and Colombia, respectively.

During her reign, she appeared in Star Trek: The Next Generation as Ensign Graham in the episode "Identity Crisis". Grudt was also the last Miss Universe to accompany Bob Hope on his USO tour.

== Life after Miss Universe ==
In 2007, Grudt was the runner-up of the third season of Skal vi danse?, the Norwegian version of Dancing with the Stars. In 2013, she was the editor of the Norwegian wedding magazine Ditt Bryllup (en. Your Wedding).

Grudt returned to the Miss Universe pageant in 1994 as a member of the jury. In 2010, she became the host of the seventh cycle of Norway's Next Top Model, which aired the following year.

Awards and achievements
Preceded by (Netherlands) Angela Visser	Miss Universe; 1990	Succeeded by (Mexico) Lupita Jones
Preceded by Lene Ørnhoft	Frøken Norge Universe; 1990	Succeeded by Lene Maria Pedersen
