= Moods of Norway =

Norwegian clothing brand

Moods of Norway AS
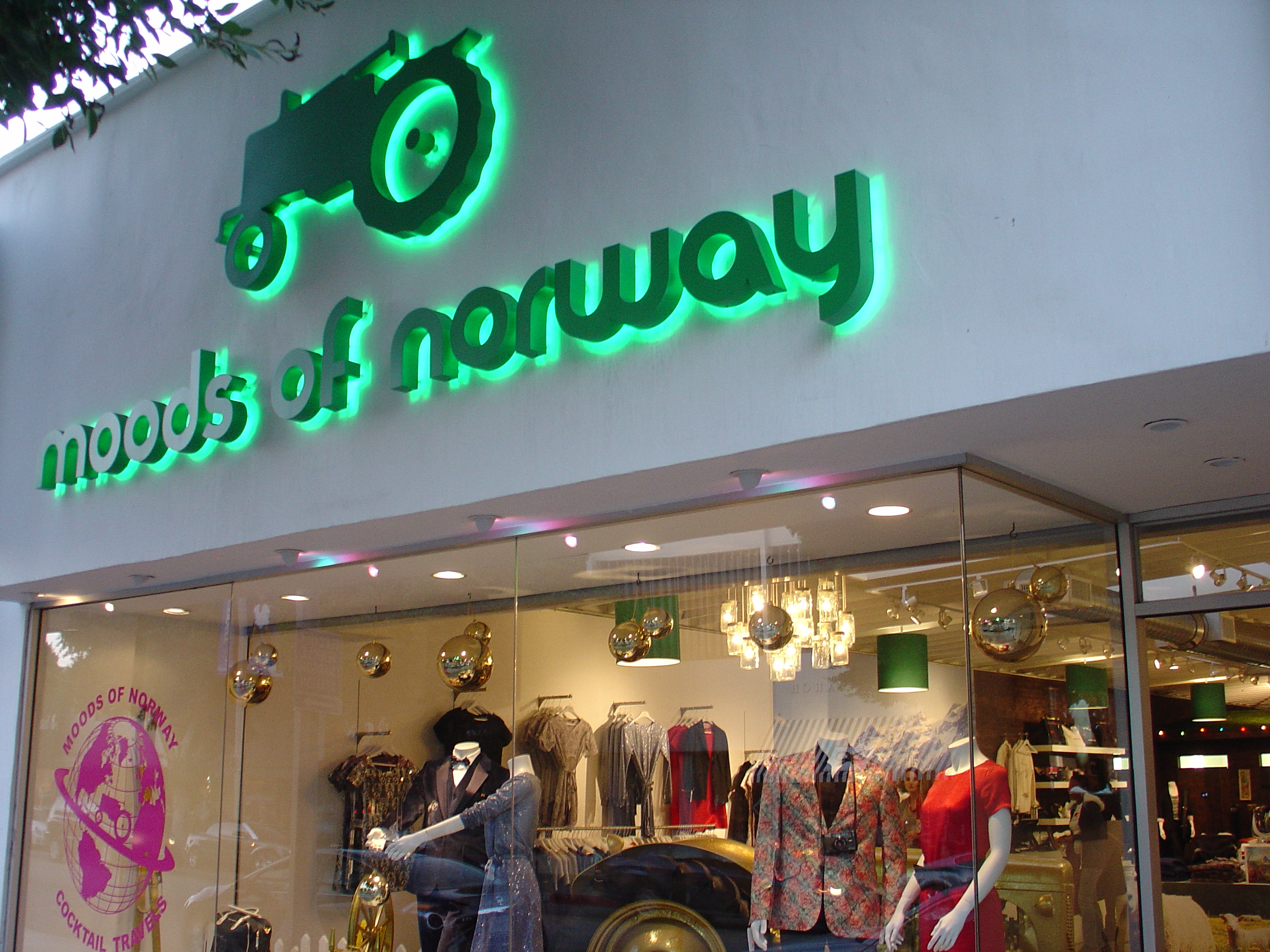
- Type: Aksjeselskap
- Industry: Retail
- Founded: 2003, 2019 (relaunch)
- Defunct: 2017
- Fate: Bankrupt
- Headquarters: Stryn, Norway
- Key people: Peder Børresen, Simen Staalnacke, Stefan Dahlquist
- Products: Textile - Apparel clothing
- Revenue: 295 Million NOK (2009)
- Website: moodsofnorway.no

Moods of Norway AS is a Norwegian clothing brand founded by Stefan Dahlkvist, Simen Staalnacke and Peder Børresen in 2003. The company declared bankruptcy on 20 September 2017. After the bankruptcy, chairman Jan Egil Flo, founder Simen Staalnacke and a group of employees bought back the rights to the Moods of Norway trademark. Moods of Norway was relaunched in March 2019 focusing on the domestic market. The company’s headquarters in the mountain town of Stryn.

== History ==
The trio was featured in the July 2009 issue of Cliché Magazine, with a story of their growing brand. Dahlkvist and Staalnacke were studying at Hawaii Pacific University, when Børresen (who was an old friend of Staalnacke's) visited. A conversation at a late night party about a fashion brand with a Norwegian twist led to the group launching the first collection in 2003. After a handful of stores in Norway, Japan, Sweden, the Netherlands, and Switzerland, Moods of Norway opened a U.S. flagship store in May 2009 on Robertson Boulevard in Beverly Hills. but the company relocated that store to Melrose Avenue in Los Angeles.

The company sports the slogan "Happy Clothes for Happy People." In the midst of their fun and edgy designs, the designers were able to incorporate their sense of humor. "246.619" is embroidered in every one of the men's suits, referring to the number of tractors in Norway.

In 2010 the brand released their first fully electronic product, a waffle iron which made waffles shaped like tractors. However, on November 17, 2011, they asked customers via Facebook and other social media, to return their waffle irons, stating it could be a fire hazard.

In 2014 Moods of Norway was one of the official designers for the Norwegian Olympic team uniforms at the Sochi Olympics opening ceremony.

On 20 September 2017 Moods of Norway declared itself bankrupt. A month later Simen Staalnacke, Jan Egil Flo and some former employees bought the bankruptcy estate for 52.6 million NOK.

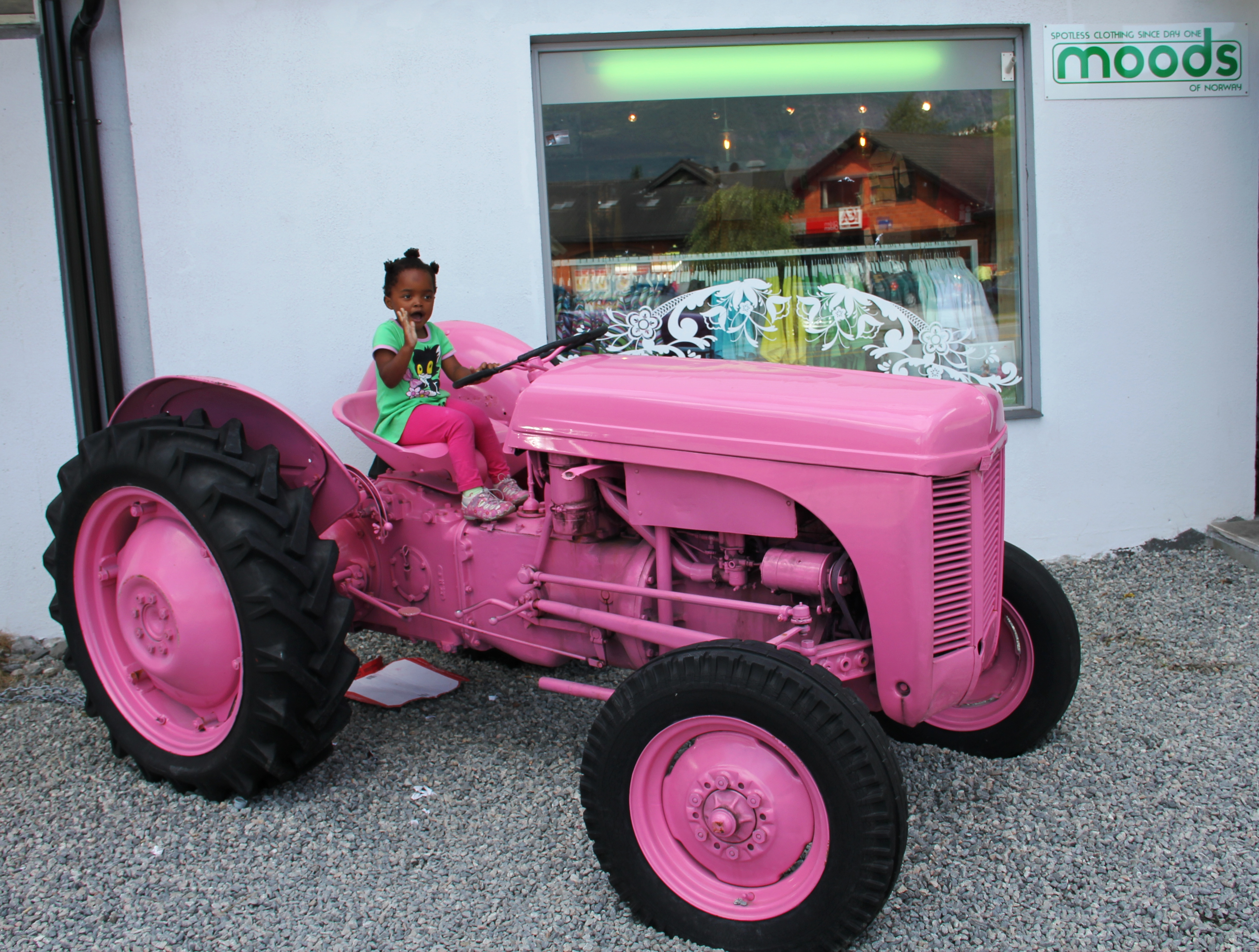
The brand imagery is based on the pink tractor

== Brand stores ==
Store in Oslo

Moods of Norway operated stores in Norway, Iceland, Japan, and the United States:

- Bodø, Norway
- Tromsø, Norway
- Ålesund, Norway
- Stryn, Norway
- Flø, Norway
- Oslo, Norway
- Bergen, Norway
- Trondheim, Norway
- Stavanger, Norway
- Geiranger, Norway
- Tokyo, Japan
- Reykjavík, Iceland
- Los Angeles, United States
- Bloomington, Minnesota, United States

== Personnel ==
Moods of Norway is run by: Jan Egil Flo (Founder); Alexander Myklebust (Logistics), Svein Inge Sølvik (QA/QC, Purchasing, and Design), Hege Kveen (Content Producer), Petter Hammer (CEO), Kristian Egge (Online Store), and Kenneth Hansen (Brand).
