= Siri Tollerød =

Norwegian model (born 1987)

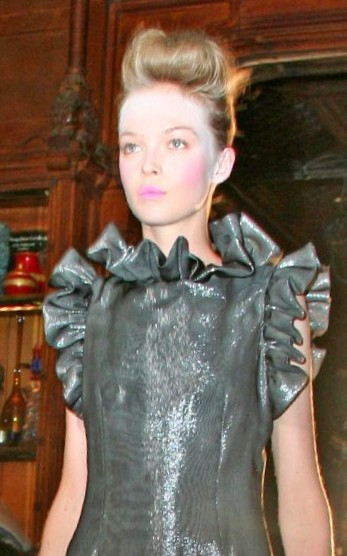
- Tollerød at New York Fashion Week in September 2007
- Born: Siri Tollerød; 18 August 1987 (age 39); Kristiansand, Norway
- Children: 1
- Modeling information
- Height: 1.78 m (5 ft 10 in)
- Hair color: Blonde
- Eye color: Blue
- Agency: Team Models (Oslo); Monster Management (Milan); Modelwerk (Hamburg)

Siri Tollerød (born 18 August 1987) is a Norwegian model.

== Early life ==
Tollerød started school at age 7. She was always active outside of school and enjoyed various sports. She has one younger sister named Susanne.

She was discovered by scout Donna Ioanna while Christmas shopping at H&M in Sørlandssenteret shopping mall. Tollerød went to Milan, Italy in September 2006 to dabble in modeling for a summer. She soon returned home to earn her high school diploma. Immediately upon graduating, she signed with Trump Models and was asked to shoot for Vogue Italia.

She moved to New York City in April 2007 to pursue full-time modeling and, within that first year, she was featured in a DKNY campaign, opened and closed the spring D&G shows, was on the cover of 10, and shot Prada Sport with Steven Meisel. In October 2009, Tollerød switched agencies from Trump to DNA Model Management.

== Career ==
Tollerød has been photographed by photographers including Steven Meisel, Karl Lagerfeld, Steven Klein and Ellen von Unwerth. Her covers include various international editions of Vogue, French Revue de Modes, Elle and other magazines. She has appeared in editorials for Dazed & Confused, Numéro, V, Harpers Bazaar, W, Allure, Elle, and various international editions of Vogue.

She has modelled for Dolce & Gabbana, Christian Lacroix, Louis Vuitton, Calvin Klein, Chanel, Dior, and Prada. A favourite of Karl Lagerfeld, Tollerød is a fixture on Chanel's runways, and opened both the Fall 2008 RTW and Pre-Fall 2008 shows.

She has been featured in advertising campaigns for Barneys New York, Bergdorf Goodman, DKNY, GAP, John Galliano, Max Mara, Miu Miu, PradaSportmax, Valentino and White House Black Market. Tollerød was the face of Valentino's Rock 'n Dreams fragrance, and Gwen Stefani's World of Harajuku Lovers fragrance. In Brazil she has been the face of many Victor Hugo campaigns.

Tollerød also starred in a fashion film called "Matchstick Girl". The film premiered at Soho House in New York on 14 April 2011.

== Charity work ==
Tollerød has joined with various well known models and designers to raise awareness for the Environmental Justice Foundation.
