= Kathrine Sørland =

Norwegian model

- Born: Kathrine Sørland; 25 March 1980 (age 46); Stavanger, Norway
- Height: 1.75 m (5 ft 9 in)
- Beauty pageant titleholder
- Title: Miss Norway World 2002; Miss Norway Universe 2004
- Hair color: Blonde
- Eye color: Blue
- Major competitions: Miss Norway 2002 (Winner); Miss World 2002 (Top 10); Miss Norway Universe 2004 (Winner); Miss Universe 2004 (Top 15)

Kathrine Sørland (born 25 March 1980) is a Norwegian fashion model, tv host and beauty pageant titleholder who has competed at Miss World and Miss Universe beauty pageants.

== Beauty pageants ==
Sørland won the Frøken Norge (Miss Norway) competition in 2001, and went on to represent Norway in the Miss World 2002 held at the Alexandra Palace in London, United Kingdom. She was the favourite to win the crown, but only reached the final five, and placed as the 3rd runner-up behind the eventual winner Miss Turkey, Azra Akın; Miss Colombia, Natalia Peralta and Miss Peru, Marina Mora. Before the pageant she was the most vocal contestant in leading calls to boycott over the Amina Lawal case. However, the pageant went ahead in Nigeria at Amina's insistence and was eventually moved to London, UK, with Sørland's participation.

Then, two years later, she went on to represent her country in the Miss Universe 2004 pageant held in Quito, Ecuador, where she reached the top fifteen and finished in the 11th place. The pageant was won by Jennifer Hawkins, Miss Australia.

== TV shows ==
Kathrine has been the presenter of several TV shows in Norway. Some of them are the Norwegian version of the reality series Top Model, the game show Casino, the sing contest for celebrities Sangstjerner (Sing stars) and a Home makeover programme named Norges styggeste rom (Norway's ugliest room).

== Personal life ==
She married estate agent Andreas Holck in the Stavanger Cathedral in Stavanger, Norway, on 1 July 2006, and she gave birth to a baby boy, Leon, on 1 October 2008. Sørland started her career as a model when she was only 15 years old in the model bureau Prestige. In addition to be a model and TV presenter, she is also the owner of a wedding dress shop, in Oslo which she opened on 31 March 2006.

Preceded by Malin Johansen	Miss Norway World; 2002	Succeeded by Elisabeth Wathne
Preceded by Hanne-Karine Sørby	Miss Norway Universe; 2004	Succeeded by Helene Tråsavik
