= Top Model (Scandinavian TV series) season 3 =

Top Model
- Season 3
- No. of episodes: 12

Release
- Original network: TV3
- Original release: February 2006 – May 2006

Season chronology
- ← Previous; Season 2

Top Model, season 3 (or Top Model: Milano) was the third and final season of Top Model. The winner of the competition was 18-year-old Freja Kjellberg Borchies from Vaxholm. The runners-up were Anna Brændstrup from Aarhus and Therese Haugsnes from Flateby. Following the conclusion of the season, the three countries parted ways and went on to produce their own individual adaptations of Top Model.

== Call-out order ==
Call-out order
| Order | Episodes | | | |
| Order | 8 | 9 | 10 | 12 |
|---|---|---|---|---|
| 1 | | | | Freja |
| 2 | | | | Anna; Therese |
| 3 | | | | Anna; Therese |
| 4 | | | Camilla; Mira Aanes; Sabina | |
| 5 | | | Camilla; Mira Aanes; Sabina | |
| 6 | | | Camilla; Mira Aanes; Sabina | |
| 7 | | Florina | | |
| 8 | Anna; Cathrine | | | |
| 9 | Anna; Cathrine | | | |

The contestant was eliminated
The contestant won the competition

== Denmark's pre-selection ==
Denmark's contestants

Denmark's competition was hosted by Anne Pedersen, who was also the head judge until the three countries merged and Cynthia Garrett took over. The first episode was aired in Denmark on 14 February 2006, with the finale being aired on 2 May. The first episode saw nine contestants selected for the competition. The final three girls chosen to compete in the final competition with Norway and Sweden were Anna Brændstrup, Camilla Schønberg and Sara Olsen. The last contestant standing was Brændstrup, who was runner-up overall.

=== Contestants ===
(ages stated are at start of contest)

==== Final 10 ====
| Contestant | Age | Height | Hometown | Finish |
|---|---|---|---|---|
| Mira Pelle | 23 | 178 cm | Svendborg | Episode 2 |
| Cecilia Kristensen | 20 | 180 cm | Arvika, Sweden | Episode 3 |
| Stine Palle | 20 | 172 cm | Næstved | Episode 4 |
| Nana Bach Nielsen | 19 | 177 cm | Nørrebro | Episode 4 |
| Line Vanggaard Nielsen | 21 | 180 cm | Copenhagen | Episode 5 |
| Christina Mortensen | 19 | 174 cm | Aalborg | Episode 6 |
| Signe Nørgaard | 20 | 173 cm | Aarhus | Episode 7 |

==== Final 3 ====
| Contestant | Age | Height | Hometown | Finish | Place |
|---|---|---|---|---|---|
| Sara Olsen | 18 | 182 cm | Nørrebro | Episode 8 | 9–8 |
| Camilla Schønberg | 19 | 172 cm | Roskilde | Episode 10 | 6–4 |
| Anna Brændstrup | 18 | 178 cm | Aarhus | Episode 12 | 3–2 |

=== Judges ===
- Anne Pedersen (host)
- Hervé Bernard (photographer)
- Mariana Verkerk (guest judge)

== Norway's pre-selection ==
Norway's competition was hosted by Kathrine Sørland, who was also the head judge until the three countries merged and Cynthia Garrett took over. The first episode was aired in Norway on 27 February 2006, with the finale being aired on 15 May. The first episode saw nine contestants selected for the competition. The final three girls chosen to compete in the final competition with Denmark and Sweden were Cathrine Wenger, Mira Aanes Wolden and Therese Haugsnes. The last contestant standing was Haugsnes, who was runner-up overall.

=== Contestants ===
(ages stated are at start of contest)

==== Final 9 ====
| Contestant | Age | Hometown | Finish |
|---|---|---|---|
| Ingrid Janne Sæberg | 21 | Bergen | Episode 2 |
| Rikke Kalsveen | 18 | Sofiemyr | Episode 3 |
| Helene Sletten Vangen | 22 | Løten | Episode 4 |
| Ellen Brenger | 23 | Oslo | Episode 5 (quit) |
| Kira Hellsten | 19 | Fredrikstad | Episode 5 |
| Camilla Abry | 23 | Hosle | Episode 7 |

==== Final 3 ====
| Contestant | Age | Hometown | Finish | Place |
|---|---|---|---|---|
| Cathrine Wenger | 19 | Asker | Episode 8 | 9–8 |
| Mira Aanes Wolden | 18 | Nærsnes | Episode 10 | 6–4 |
| Therese Haugsnes | 21 | Flateby | Episode 12 | 3–2 |

== Sweden's pre-selection ==
Sweden's contestants

Sweden's competition was hosted by Malin Persson, who was also the head judge until the three countries merged and Cynthia Garrett took over. The first episode was aired in Sweden on 8 March 2006, with the finale being aired on 24 May. The two-hour premiere saw ten contestants selected for the competition. The final three girls chosen to compete in the final competition with Denmark and Norway were Florina Weisz, Freja Kjellberg Borchies and Sabina Karlsson. The last contestant standing was Kjellberg Borchies, who went on to win the competition.

=== Contestants ===
(ages stated are at start of contest)

==== Final 10 ====
| Contestant | Age | Height | Hometown | Finish |
|---|---|---|---|---|
| Sandra Nilsson | 20 | 175 cm | Malmö | Episode 2 |
| Joanna Häggblom | 19 | 175 cm | Gothenburg | Episode 2 |
| Ebba Söderström | 17 | 177 cm | Stockholm | Episode 3 |
| Emma Johansson | 20 | 181 cm | Stockholm | Episode 4 |
| Julia Agapova | 19 | 176 cm | Farsta | Episode 5 |
| Sofia Eriksson | 19 | 180 cm | Smedjebacken | Episode 6 |
| Kristina Svensson | 19 | 177 cm | Huskvarna | Episode 7 |

==== Final 3 ====
| Contestant | Age | Height | Hometown | Finish | Place |
|---|---|---|---|---|---|
| Florina Weisz | 20 | 175 cm | Halmstad | Episode 9 | 7 |
| Sabina Karlsson | 17 | 180 cm | Växjö | Episode 10 | 6–4 |
| Freja Kjellberg Borchies | 18 | 179 cm | Vaxholm | Episode 12 | 1 |

== Photo shoot guide ==
- Photo shoot 1: Fruit swimsuits
- Photo shoot 2: Young mothers
- Photo shoot 3: Romantic sensuality
- Photo shoot 4: Busy streets couture
- Photo shoot 5: Underwater nymphs
- Photo shoot 6: Gladiatoresses
- Photo shoot 7: Bikinis on the Italian Alps
- Photo shoot 8: Golden 20s Vamp
- Photo shoot 9: Beauty shoot with popsicles
- Photo shoot 10: Diva with man and paparazzi
