= Art in General =

Exhibition space in Manhattan, New York

Coordinates: 40°43′5.15″N 74°0′6.64″W

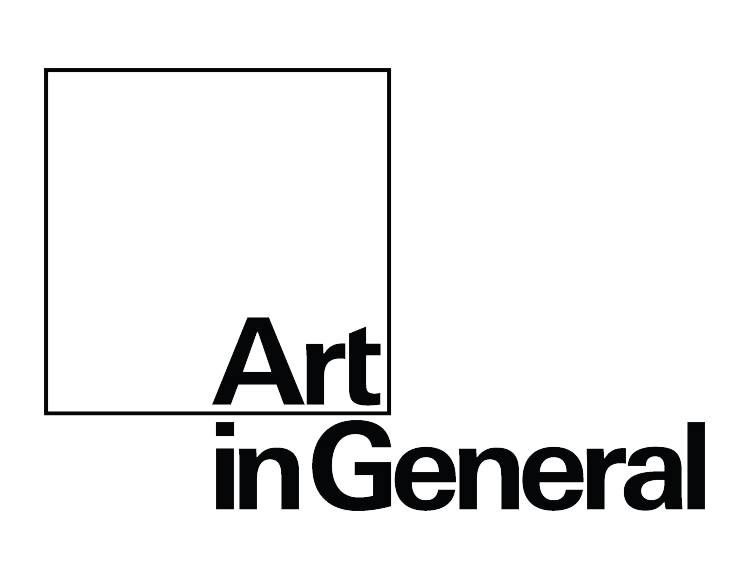
- Established: 1981
- Type: Nonprofit arts organization
- Website: www.artingeneral.art

Art in General was a non-profit contemporary art exhibition space known for its vibrant and ground-breaking projects as a formidable and longstanding New York City alternative space, focused on giving meaningful resources and opportunities to artists early on in their careers. Founded in 1981 by artists Martin Weinstein and Teresa Liszka and originally located in the General Hardware building in New York City — hence the organization's name, Art in General — the institution produced and presented distinctive programs and exhibitions featuring new work by local and international artists.

Since its first exhibition in 1982, Art in General provided spaces for artists to display unconventional work and exchange ideas with their peers for almost 40 years, making it one of the longest-standing artist-founded non-profit artist organizations in New York City. Art in General organized exhibitions; commissions new art projects; hosted national and international artist residency programs; and facilitated regular free public programs with renowned artists, critics and curators. More than 2,000 artists exhibited their work at Art in General in a wide range of disciplines—painting, sculpture, drawing, photography, installation art, audio, video art, performance art and new media art.

== Programs ==
The New Commissions Program, Art in General’s central focus, flourished since its launch in 2005. The program was created in response to artists’ need for support to create major new projects that would significantly advance their practice. Art in General commissioned new works, either through an open call, or through direct invitation. Art in General provided commissioned artists with both space and a budget for developing their project, as well as an honorarium. Initially designed for New York based artists, in 2012 this program expanded to include projects by international artists.

Art in General established the Eastern European Residency Exchange (EERE) in 2001, with the goal of supporting critical dialogue, the presentation of new work, and a greater understanding of diverse cultures. This program took the form of a two-way artist residency until 2013, when it expanded to encompass institutional co-commissioning and other forms of exchange. Art in General’s partner institutions have included: 'kim?' Contemporary Art Centre in Riga, Latvia; The Gardens in Vilnius, Lithuania; Pavilion Unicredit in Bucharest, Romania; Croatian Association of Artists (HDLU) in Zagreb, Croatia; The Museum of Modern and Contemporary Art in Rijeka, Croatia; Centre for Contemporary Arts FUTURA in Prague, Czech Republic; The Trafó House of Contemporary Arts in Budapest, Hungary; Center For Contemporary Arts Estonia in Tallinn; Bunkier Sztuki Gallery in Kraków, Poland; Swimming Pool in Sofia, Bulgaria; and The Centre for Contemporary Art in Warsaw, Poland.

Art in General regularly organized other discursive programs and exhibitions. When Art in General was located in Manhattan, its Audio in the Elevator program began in 1990 in response to the slow-moving elevator that takes 38 seconds to reach the 6th floor gallery from street level. Art in General saw this unfavorable circumstance as an opportunity to create a new exhibition space in the elevator, where one to five audio or video art projects were displayed each year. In 2018 Rational Dress Society, a counter-fashion collective, were commissioned to create official Art in General uniforms that all members of its staff wore in contemplation of "what cultural work should look like in difficult political times".

== Artists ==
Art in General had a long history of supporting artists early in their careers. Since 1981, Art in General is proud to have supported and shown over 2,000 emerging and mid-career artists and collectives who have gone onto greater success, including Dorothea Rockburne, Joan Jonas, Kay WalkingStick, Rirkrit Tiravanija, Glenn Ligon, Byron Kim, Elizabeth Peyton, Marina Abramović, Gabriel Orozco, Paul Pfeiffer, William Pope.L, Pipilotti Rist, Francis Alÿs, Walid Raad, Sharon Hayes, Patty Chang, Allora & Calzadilla, Pierre Huyghe, Andrea Geyer, Xaviera Simmons, Lisi Raskin, Kambui Olujimi, Carlos Motta, Jill Magid, Marwa Arsanios, Adelita Husni-Bey, Dineo Seshee Bopape, Fatma Bucak, Postcommodity, Duane Linklater, Chim↑Pom, Sondra Perry, Anna Daučíková, Aliza Shvarts, Zach Blas, among many others. Its roster of artists reflected its deep and long-standing commitment to diversity and equity in the arts. Art in General was often at the forefront of giving artists their first New York exhibitions.

== Curators ==
The institution had also been a crucial one for giving diverse curators a chance to curate risk-taking exhibitions early in their careers. Not unlike the artists it supports, many who curated exhibitions for Art in General as staff members or as guest curators later went on to notable acclaim for their impactful and highly original curatorial work, writing on contemporary artists, and leading of important arts institutions such as Holly Block, Anne Barlow, Sofía Hernández Chong Cuy, Dean Daderko, Eva Díaz, Andria Hickey, Ruba Katrib, Laura Hoptman, Laurel Ptak, Franklin Sirmans, Hazma Walker, and others.

== Leadership ==
Art in General had a long history of supporting women in leadership roles. From 1981 to 1988, Art in General was led by its founders, artists Martin Weinstein and Teresa Liszka. After Weinstein and Liszka stepped aside from actively overseeing day-to-day operations, Holly Block was appointed the inaugural Executive Director in 1988. Subsequently, Art in General proudly established itself as a woman-led organization.

Executive Directors: Holly Block (1988–2006); Anne Barlow (2007–2016); Laurel Ptak (2017–2020); Irene Mei Zhi Shum (2020).

== Facilities ==
From 1981 to 2015, Art in General was located at 79 Walker Street in the Tribeca East Historic District in Manhattan, in a six-floor building owned by General Hardware Manufacturing Inc. (now General Tools & Instruments LLC), hence the organization’s name. Located at the intersection of three neighborhoods in New York City (Tribeca, SoHo, and Chinatown), Art in General had since its founding been committed to presenting new work by artists of color, women, immigrants and visiting artists. In 2003, Gerry Weinstein, CEO of General Tools & Instruments LLC, donated the storefront to Art in General for use as a gallery. In 2006, the sixth-floor gallery underwent a major renovation by Steven Learner Studios and was re-opened in January 2007 with Le Musée Minuscule, created in honor of New Langton Arts’ former space of the same name. In 2014, General Tools was acquired by High Road Capital Partners, a private equity group. When the business was sold and the building changed ownership, Art in General lost its primary patron, that provided corporate donations as well as rent-free office and exhibition space. Then Director Anne Barlow and board president Robert Ferguson moved its office to 20 Jay Street and its gallery to 145 Plymouth Street in DUMBO, Brooklyn in January 2016. Although the office and gallery had different mailing addresses, they were in fact located in the same building, owned by Two Trees Management. In August 2020 then Director Irene Mei Zhi Shum announced that Art in General would be partnering with Mana Contemporary and relocating the office to Mana's facility in Jersey City, New Jersey, stating in a press release, "This new partnership allows Art in General to organize programs and exhibitions across Mana Contemporary’s real estate portfolio, which includes buildings in Jersey City, New Jersey; Chicago, Illinois; and Miami, Florida. It also provides studio space for visiting artists and curators for Art in General's residency programs. This opportunity was made possible by the generous support of Eugene Lemay, founder of Mana Contemporary." However in October 2020 Art in General was shuttered deeply saddening the arts community. The closure was the direct result of the COVID-19 pandemic. In a statement, Board President Leslie Ruff and Executive Director Irene Mei Zhi Shum cited the pressures of the ongoing coronavirus pandemic. “Although we have taken critical measures to adjust to the new normal, the financial constriction due to COVID-19 has proved formidable, severely affecting our ability to fulfill our mission.” They continued, “In this difficult time for us all, we offer our sincere thanks to you — our alumni artists, guest curators, visitors, former staff and donors — for your passion and dedication, interest and support during the last forty years.”

== Legacy ==
The Archives of American Art, Smithsonian Institution, acquired the archive of Art in General. The Art in General archive comprehensively chronicles the decades of exhibitions and programs and long-standing commitment to diversity and equity in the arts. The more than one hundred linear feet of materials donated to the Archives of American Art include Holly Block’s files, documenting her 18-year tenure as Art in General’s forward-thinking first director.

“It is a tremendous honor to preserve the legacy of one of New York’s most important non-profit institutions,” said Liza Kirwin, interim director, Archives of American Art. “The Archives is proud to be stewards of Art in General’s historic records, ensuring that they are preserved and available to the public and future generations.”
