= Evolve =

Evolve may refer to:

- Evolution, change in heritable characteristics of biological populations over time

== Music ==
- Evolve (Ani DiFranco album) or the title song, 2003
- Evolve (Coldrain album), 2014
- Evolve (Endo album), 2001
- Evolve (Imagine Dragons album), 2017
- Evolve (Sub Focus album), 2023
- Evolve (Phish album)
- Evolve (EP), by Chelsea Grin, 2012
- Evolve, an album by Eye Empire, 2013
- Evolve, an album by Indus Creed, 2012
- Evolve, an album by Mo Jamil, 2018
- "Evolve", a song by 5 Seconds of Summer from Everyone's a Star!, 2025
- "Evolve", a song by Mýa from K.I.S.S. (Keep It Sexy & Simple), 2011
- "Evolve", a song by The Warning from Error, 2022

== Companies and products ==
- Evolve (professional wrestling), an American professional-wrestling promotion
- Evolve MMA, a Singaporean chain of martial arts academies
- Evolve Motorcycles, an American electric scooter and motorcycle manufacturer 2008–2015
- Evolve, a medical records software platform developed by Kainos
- Evolve, a pest control bait produced by SenesTech

== Other uses ==
- Evolve (TV series), a 2008–2009 documentary series on the History Channel
- Evolve (video game), a 2015 squad-based action game
- Evolve Festival, an annual music and cultural festival in New Brunswick, Canada
- Evolve USA, a gun safety organization

== See also ==
- Devolve
- Evolution (disambiguation)
- Revolve (disambiguation)
