= Top Model (Scandinavian TV series) =

Scandinavian reality television show

- Created by: Tyra Banks
- Presented by: Georgianna Robertson; Cynthia Garrett
- Judges: J. Alexander; Mariana Verkerk; Cynthia Garrett; Georgianna Robertson
- Countries of origin: Denmark; Norway; Sweden
- Original languages: Danish; Norwegian; Swedish

Production
- Running time: 60 minutes

Original release
- Network: TV3
- Release: February 2005 – May 2006

Top Model is a Scandinavian reality television show, based on Tyra Banks' America's Next Top Model. It was broadcast on TV3 in Denmark, Norway and Sweden by Viasat in 2005 and 2006. A second adaptation of the show featuring plus-sized models was produced by the network in 2016.

== Format ==
The competition was divided into three separate competitions: Denmark, Norway and Sweden. Each contest began with a group of twenty-something national semi-finalists that were narrowed down to nine national finalists in the first episode. Each episode, one contestant was eliminated, until there were just three contestants remaining in each competition. At that point, the three competitions would merge into one overall competition. The last contestant standing from each country competed in the finale, and from this group a winner was chosen.

The individual hosts for each country were Anne Pedersen in Denmark, Kathrine Sørland in Norway, and Mini Andén in Sweden. Andén left the show after the first two seasons and was replaced by Malin Persson for the third. The merged competition was hosted by Georgianna Robertson in season 1 and Cynthia Garrett in seasons 2 and 3.

The show ran for three seasons, after which the countries parted ways and began their own individual adaptions of Top Model. In 2016, a new series, Top Model Curves, which includes contestants from all three countries, was broadcast. The winner of season 1 of Top Model was Kine Bakke, who represented Norway. Season 2 was won by Frøydis Elvenes, also representing Norway. Season 3 was won by Freja Kjellberg Borchies, representing Sweden.

== Seasons ==
Season	Premiere date	Winner	Runners-up	Other contestants in order of elimination	National finalists	Number of contestants
1 New York City	Denmark 15 February 2005; Sweden 16 February 2005; Norway 17 February 2005	Kine Bakke	Elina Herbeck; Nanna Schultz Christensen	Stine Mangaard Hansen, Madelene Lund & Kristin Rem Trehjørningen, Maja Ekberg & Henriette Stenbeck & Cecilie Madsen	Denmark / Norway / Sweden; Malene von der Maase; Amirah Hamed Alsarrag; Sophie Schandorff; Helga Rose; Anne Baunbæk Pedersen; Stéphanie Rasmussen / Anne Hauge; Amila Vuckic; Warsan Adam; Anna Kolaczkowska; Tina Nordby; Marna Haugen / Paula Quiroga; Maria Öhrstrand (quit); Heléne Melin; Maria Lager; Kumba M'bye; Louise Willenheimer; Julia Krischel	28
2 Paris	Norway 5 September 2005; Denmark 6 September 2005; Sweden 14 September 2005	Frøydis Elvenes	Anna Nørgaard; Arwen Bergström	Mikaela Källgren & Louise Falkenblad & Karin Santini, Tine Holm Riis & Kristine Øverby & Janni Juntunen	Denmark / Norway / Sweden; Mikaela K. Ibsen; Tanja Johnsen; Line Bang; Sofie Thrane; Heidi Helm Larsen; Lise M. Andersen / Nazila Shirindel; Annette Kjær; Nora Møller; Elise Måge; Sarah Mohamud; Sandra Otteraaen / Fahrie Berisha; Charlotte Treschow; Anna Maria Moström; Jazzmine Berger; Maria Lindgren; Emelie Törnqvist	27
3 Milan	Denmark 14 February 2006; Norway 27 February 2006; Sweden 8 March 2006	Freja Kjellberg Borchies	Anna Brændstrup; Therese Haugsnes	Sara Olsen & Cathrine Wenger, Florina Weisz, Sabina Karlsson & Mira Aanes Wolden & Camilla Schønberg	Denmark / Norway / Sweden; Mira Pelle; Cecilia Kristensen; Stine Palle; Nana Bach Nielsen; Line Vanggaard Nielsen; Christina Mortensen; Signe Nørgaard / Ingrid Janne Sæberg; Rikke Kalsveen; Helene Sletten Vangen; Ellen Brenger (quit); Kira Hellsten; Camilla Abry / Sandra Nilsson; Joanna Häggblom; Ebba Söderström; Emma Johansson; Julia Agapova; Sofia Eriksson; Kristina Svensson	29
