= Shai Baitel =

Creative Director and Writer

- שי ביתל
- Born: 1975 (age 50–51)
- Occupations: Artistic director; Art entrepreneur; Writer
- Known for: Co-founder of Mana Contemporary; Inaugural artistic director of The Modern Art Museum Shanghai

Shai Baitel (Hebrew: שי ביתל; born 1975) is an artistic director and art entrepreneur. He is a contributor and writer for several prominent publications as well as an active philanthropist. He is the co-founder and executive director of Mana Contemporary, a global, multidisciplinary and comprehensive arts center. In 2020, Baitel was announced as the inaugural artistic director of The Modern Art Museum Shanghai.

== Early life and education ==
Baitel was born in 1975 in Nazareth, Israel.

Baitel holds an LL.M in international business and trade law from Fordham University in New York City, and graduated, with honors, from Tel Aviv University earning a degree in Law and Middle East history.

== Professional career ==
=== Mana Contemporary ===
Baitel is the co-founder of Mana Contemporary - a global, comprehensive arts center. Together with its president Eugene Lemay, Baitel has started working on the MANA project in 2012 and has been serving as Senior Vice President, Director of Corporate Development & Global Partnerships.

Mana Contemporary is based in a former tobacco warehouse in Jersey City and has additional locations in Chicago and Miami.

Through Mana, Baitel has spearheaded collaborations with artist such as Jeff Koons, Marina Abramovic, Richard Serra and American Actor Whoopi Goldberg who curated an exhibition on Marilyn Monroe in 2016.

=== Modern Art Museum Shanghai ===
In November 2020, Baitel was announced as the artistic director at the Modern Art Museum in Shanghai.

Baitel first exhibited at the Modern Art Museum Shanghai (MAM) with his in September 2019. The exhibition named “Retrospectrum” focused on the life and work of musician Bob Dylan.

The exhibition was seen by a quarter of a million people, being moved to Beijing, Shenzhen, and then to the Patricia & Phillip Frost Art Museum at Florida International University in Miami where it was exhibited during Art Basel's Miami Beach Art Week at the start of December 2021. The exhibition has since been on view also at the National Museum of XXI Century Arts (MAXXI) in Rome, Italy.

As part of the exhibition at MAXXI, Baitel edited and published Bob Dylan. Retrospectrum. The book presents an overview of Bob Dylan’s life as a painter and sculptor in over 100 drawings, paintings, metal sculptures and videos. The work features essays from Baitel, Caterina Caselli, Bob Dylan, Alain Elkann, Anne-Marie Mai, Richard Prince and Greg Tate.

In July 2021, Baitel curated Zaha Hadid Architects 'ZHA Close Up – Work & Research' at the Modern Art Museum Shanghai. The exhibition displayed Zaha Hadid Architects projects from 1982 to the present day, including the MAXXI Museum in Rome and the Leeza SOHO in Beijing.

The exhibition was the first dedicated to the work of architect Zaha Hadid to take place in mainland China.

In March 2023, alongside Bartolomeo Pietromarchi and Elena Motisi, Baitel curated ‘Conscious Collective’ at the MAXXI Museum in Rome.

=== OR Movement ===
Baitel was U.S. Director of OR Movement. The OR Movement is dedicated to the building and growing of new communities in the Negev and Galilee regions of Israel. Baitel established and cultivated relationships with philanthropists, high-net-worth individuals, business leaders and Christian and Evangelical groups.

=== United Nations ===
Between 2001 and 2003, Baitel served as legal advisor to the Joint Appeals, Board of the United Nations Department of Management, a body advising the Secretary General with regard to appeals.

=== Ministry of Justice of the State of Israel ===
From 1999 to 2001, Baitel worked at Israel’s Ministry of Justice Department of International Agreements and International Litigation in various legal positions.

Baitel is also a Fellow in the Program on Applied Decision Analysis at the Lauder School of Government, Diplomacy and Strategy, at the Interdisciplinary Center (IDC) Herzliya.

=== Damascus Square ===
In the Winter of 2011 Baitel conceived and co-wrote the book, lyrics and music of a new musical called “Damascus Square” with composer Oran Eldor and lyricist Sarah Hirsch. The musical depicts the story of a spy who finds himself in an identity crisis. It is loosely based on the espionage story of Eli Cohen, the Israeli spy who was on a mission from Mossad in Syria in the 1960s. The musical premiered in September 2012 at the United Nations.

In 2013 Damascus Square was staged at The Old Vic Tunnels in London after the artistic director of its sister theatre (The Old Vic) expressed interest.

In 2014, a concert version of the musical was directed by Ohad (Odi) Ashkenazi in New York City. The play starred Broadway actors Richard Blake and Tovah Feldush. The musical was displayed on stages at the famous Waldorf Astoria and the Broadway cabaret club "54 Below".

In 2015 the musical was performed at Axelrod Performing Arts Center in New Jersey in collaboration with Mana Contemporary.

== Writings and publications ==
Baitel is a prolific writer and frequent contributor to major publications. His articles have appeared in Forbes, Forbes (Israel), New York Daily News, Jerusalem Post and Haaretz. He has worked as a columnist for the Huffington Post. Baitel primarily offers his insights in the form of essays and contributions to high-profile events as well as film and visual projects.
