= Milk Makeup =

American cosmetics company

Milk Makeup LLC
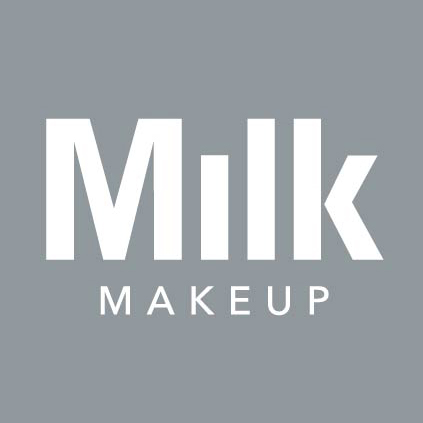
- Type: Public
- Industry: Beauty
- Founded: February 2016; 10 years ago
- Key people: Mazdack Rassi (product developer); Dianna Ruth (COO); Georgie Greville (Creative Director)
- Owner: Waldencast Partners LP

Milk Makeup is a New York City-based cosmetics and skin care company created by the founders of Milk Studios. Despite its name, it is 100% vegan.

== History ==
Milk Makeup was launched in February 2016 and was founded in New York City by Milk Studios co-founder Mazdack Rassi, fashion editor, and entertainment reporter Zanna Roberts Rassi, creative director Georgie Greville and product developer Dianna Ruth. Media executive Scott Sassa serves as chairman.

The company's products were initially distributed by Sephora. In addition to Sephora and the brand’s own website, Milk Makeup is currently sold at Cult Beauty, Space NK, and Amazon. In 2017, the company received an investment from Main Post Partners. It was acquired by Waldencast along with Obagi in June 2022.

Milk Makeup has collaborated with a number of different brands and partners. In November 2018, the company collaborated with Wu-Tang and TRUE NYC, paying homage to their NYC roots and celebrating self-expression, strength, and the creative connection between them. In 2023, they partnered with Reebok on a limited edition line of sneakers, and with Awake NY on a range of self-care essentials.

== Products ==
Milk Makeup began with a lineup of 85 SKUs, including lipsticks and blotting papers.

The brand gained attention in the online beauty community, following the release of its cannabis oil-infused mascara, KUSH Mascara. The ingredient is promoted as a lash conditioner and has since been included in a multitude of products, within the brand's 'KUSH' line. In 2019, Milk Makeup also made a name for itself with the launch of its now cult-favorite Hydro Grip Primer. This was followed by the equally viral Hydro Grip Set + Refresh Spray.

== Reception ==
Milk Makeup has received praise from publications such as Vogue, Teen Vogue Vanity Fair, and InStyle Magazine.

The brand's Hydro Grip Primer won an Allure Best of Beauty award for best primer in 2019.

In 2022, its liquid Bionic Blush won a Best in Black Beauty award from Essence and RISE Mascara won a Glamour Beauty Award.

The company has also been noted for its use of 'atypical' models, such as Sabina Karlsson, and LGBT models.

In March 2021, the company announced that they would donate 1% of all annual sales from their website to The Center, their longtime LGBTQIA+ advocacy partner in New York. They have also been noted for their 2021 partnership with the Fashion Scholarship Fund to support Black scholars and students of color.
