= Top Model (Scandinavian TV series) season 1 =

Top Model
- Season 1
- No. of episodes: 12

Release
- Original network: TV3
- Original release: February 2005 – May 2005

Season chronology
- Next → Season 2

Top Model, season 1 (or Top Model: New York) was the first season of Top Model. It was broadcast on TV3 in Denmark, Norway, and Sweden by Viasat from February to May 2005. The winner of the competition was 21-year-old Kine Bakke from Bergen. The runners-up were Elina Herbeck from Umeå and Nanna Schultz Christensen from Copenhagen.

== Denmark's pre-selection ==
Denmark's contestants

Denmark's competition was hosted by Anne Pedersen, who was also the head judge until the three countries merged and Georgianna Robertson took over. The first episode was aired in Denmark on 15 February 2005 with the final episode being aired on 3 May. The first episode saw nine contestants selected for the competition.

The final three girls chosen to compete in the final competition with Norway and Sweden were Cecilie Madsen, Nanna Schultz Christensen and Stine Mangaard Hansen. The last contestant standing was Schultz Christensen, who was runner-up overall.

=== Contestants ===
(ages stated are at start of contest)

==== Final 9 ====
Contestant	Age	Height	Hometown	Finish
Malene von der Maase	20	174cm	Holte	Episode 2
Amirah Hamed Alsarrag	23	175cm	Nørresundby	Episode 3
Sophie Tine Schandorff	18	174cm	Albertslund	Episode 4
Helga Rose	24	175cm	Frederiksberg	Episode 5
Anne Baunbæk Pedersen	19	174cm	Lyngby/Frederiksberg	Episode 6
Stéphanie Juana Rasmussen	21	176cm	Aabenraa	Episode 7

==== Final 3 ====
Contestant	Age	Height	Hometown	Finish	Place
Stine Mangaard Hansen	18	176 cm	Risskov	Episode 8	9
Cecilie Madsen	22	174 cm	Bjerringbro	Episode 10	6–4
Nanna Schultz Christensen	22	172 cm	Copenhagen	Episode 12	3–2

=== Call out order ===
Order	Episodes					
Order	2	3	4	5	6	7
1	Nanna	Cecilie	Stine	Stéphanie	Stéphanie	Cecilie
2	Sophie	Stine	Cecilie	Stine	Cecilie	Nanna
3	Amirah	Nanna	Anne	Nanna	Stine	Stine
4	Cecilie	Stéphanie	Nanna	Anne	Nanna	Stéphanie
5	Helga	Helga	Helga	Cecilie	Anne	
6	Anne	Sophie	Stéphanie	Helga		
7	Stine	Anne	Sophie			
8	Stéphanie	Amirah				
9	Malene					

The contestant was eliminated at judging panel

== Sweden's pre-selection ==
Sweden's contestants

Sweden's competition was hosted by Mini Andén, who was also the head judge until the three countries merged and Georgianna Robertson took over. The first episode was aired in Sweden on 16 February 2005 with the final episode being aired on 27 April. The first episode saw nine contestants selected for the competition.

The final three girls chosen to compete in the final competition with Denmark and Norway were Elina Herbeck, Madelene Lund and Maja Ekberg. The last contestant standing was Herbeck, who was runner-up overall.

=== Contestants ===
(ages stated are at start of contest)

==== Final 10 ====
Contestant	Age	Height	Hometown	Finish
Paula Quiroga	20	173 cm	Stockholm	Episode 2
Maria Öhrstrand	19	178 cm	Malmö	Episode 3 (quit)
Heléne Melin	20	176 cm	Värnamo	Episode 3
Maria Lager	19	179 cm	Stockholm	Episode 4
Kumba M'bye	21	—	—	Episode 5
Louise Willenheimer	19	177 cm	Malmö	Episode 6
Julia Krischel	20	173 cm	Hammarö	Episode 7

==== Final 3 ====
Contestant	Age	Height	Hometown	Outcome	Place
Madelene Lund	20	173 cm	Stockholm	Episode 9	8–7
Maja Ekberg	21	175 cm	Borås	Episode 10	6–4
Elina Herbeck	19	180 cm	Umeå	Episode 12	3–2

=== Call out order ===
Order	Episodes					
Order	2	3	4	5	6	7
1	Maja	Elina	Julia	Maja	Elina	Elina
2	Madelene	Kumba	Maja	Julia	Madelene	Madelene
3	Louise	Maja	Elina	Louise	Julia	Maja
4	Elina	Julia	Kumba	Madelene	Maja	Julia
5	Maria L.	Madelene	Louise	Elina	Louise	
6	Helene	Maria.L	Madelene	Kumba		
7	Maria Ö.	Louise	Maria L.			
8	Julia	Heléne				
9	Paula	Maria Ö.				

The contestant was eliminated at judging panel
The contestant quit the competition

== Norway's pre-selection ==
Norway's contestants

Norway's competition was hosted by Kathrine Sørland, who was also the head judge until the three countries merged and Georgianna Robertson took over. The first episode was aired in Norway on 17 February 2005 with the final episode being aired on 12 May.

The final three girls chosen to compete in the final competition with Denmark and Sweden were Henriette Stenbeck, Kine Bakke and Kristin Rem Trehjørningen. The last contestant standing was Bakke, who went on to win the competition.

=== Contestants ===
(ages stated are at start of contest)

==== Final 9 ====
Contestant	Age	Height	Hometown	Finish
Anne Hauge	23	174 cm	Sola	Episode 2
Amila Vuckic	19	175 cm	Rykkinn	Episode 3
Warsan Adam	22	175 cm	—	Episode 4
Anna Kolaczkowska	21	177 cm	Ellingsrud	Episode 5
Tina Nordby	22	173 cm	—	Episode 6
Marna Haugen	23	176 cm	Ørsta	Episode 7

==== Final 3 ====
Contestant	Age	Height	Hometown	Finish	Place
Kristin Rem Trehjørningen	20	177 cm	—	Episode 9	8–7
Henriette Floridon Stenbeck	19	179 cm	—	Episode 10	6–4
Kine Lauvås Bakke	21	180 cm	Bergen	Episode 12	1

=== Call out order ===
Order	Episodes					
Order	2	3	4	5	6	7
1	Tina	Kine	Kine	Henriette	Kristin	Kine
2	Henriette	Marna	Marna	Tina	Henriette	Henriette
3	Kine	Henriette	Kristin	Kine	Marna	Kristin
4	Marna	Kristin	Henriette	Marna	Kine	Marna
5	Warsan	Tina	Anna	Kristin	Tina	
6	Amila	Warsan	Tina	Anna		
7	Kristin	Anna	Warsan			
8	Anna	Amila				
9	Anne					

The contestant was eliminated at judging panel

== Photo shoot guide ==
- Episode 1 photo shoot: Bikini on New York City street
- Episode 2 photo shoot: Confinement
- Episode 3 photo shoot: With animals
- Episode 4 photo shoot: Madonna-style
- Episode 5 photo shoot: Emotions
- Episode 6 photo shoot: Pairs
- Episode 7 photo shoot: Bikinis in Miami
- Episode 8 photo shoot: Tour buses in NYC
- Episode 9 photo shoot: Top Model covers
- Episode 10 photo shoot: B&W with Marcus Schenkenberg
