= Eugene Lemay =

American artist and fraudster (born 1960)

Eugene Lemay (born 1960) is a convicted felon, artist and the former president and founder of Mana Contemporary, located in Jersey City, Chicago, and Miami. He was born in Grand Rapids, Michigan, and moved to Israel at age 13 with his family, where he spent his adolescence and young-adult life in a kibbutz. After serving in the Israeli Army, he moved to New York and started working at Moishe's Moving Systems. He is an active artist based in Jersey City and Miami, working across various mediums, including painting, sculpture, installation, sound, new-media technology, and other mixed media, and he's exhibited widely both nationally and internationally.

In October 2021 Lemay was removed from his role as executive director of Mana Contemporary after his indictment to defraud the IRS for his attempt to evade $7.8 million in payroll taxes. In January of 2025, Lemay was found guilty and was sentenced to "21 months imprisonment on each count to be served concurrently, followed by two years of supervised release on each count to be served concurrently".

== Biography ==
Lemay was born in Grand Rapids, Michigan, to a French-Canadian father and half-Lebanese and half-Syrian mother; he was the ninth of fifteen children. His father was a master printer for the local Grand Rapids Press newspaper, and was an activist with leftist-leaning values, publishing a controversial newspaper called the Organizer to bring awareness to hardship and poverty found in underserved communities. The Organizer was banned in his city, so he had to publish outside, and his family was often in trouble for doing so. His family converted to Judaism in 1969, and when Lemay was thirteen they moved to Israel to live in a leftist kibbutz called Kibbutz Sarid. At age nineteen, Lemay entered the Israeli army and rose quickly to rank as a sergeant in a special unit.

== Mana Contemporary ==
Lemay founded Mana Contemporary in Jersey City, New Jersey, in 2011, where he served as president and CEO. After working in the business of art storage, he fell frustrated with the masses of impressive art collections that are spent buried away in storage, so Lemay wanted to develop a space for exhibiting these art collections that would otherwise remain in storage. Since its inception Mana Contemporary has come to encompass two more locations in Chicago and Miami, for which all three spaces now host exhibitions, artist residencies, artist studios, dance residencies, programming, performances, events, and serves as a growing arts community. Though a relatively young institution, Mana has continued to swiftly expand in terms of space, artist resources, and arts and culture educational programming, which has been recognized throughout several publications, along with Lemay as the integral force behind Mana. In 2013, he was named one of Blouin Art + Auction's “Power 100” for his role at Mana.

As an artist himself, Lemay had more in mind for Mana Contemporary as he began to witness the effects of gentrification and climbing real estate prices, which displaced many artists from their studios. While in the process of founding Mana, Lemay also set the goal to make Mana a space that would provide his fellow artists with the studios, resources, and creative community necessary to help artists hold successful careers—an idea that was in fact inspired by the communal nature of his experience in the kibbutz. Lemay has also erected numerous projects to draw attention to art of many different geographies and cultures; he founded the Middle Eastern Center for the Arts (MECA) inside of Mana, for example, which is a dedicated exhibition space for independent curators to host shows that focus on different subjects and angles for art of the Middle East.

== Indictment and conviction for tax fraud ==
In October 2021, Lemay was charged by the US Attorney’s Office for the Southern District of New York with an elaborate conspiracy to defraud the IRS for his attempt to evade $7.8 million in payroll taxes and was removed from his role as executive director of Mana Contemporary. In January 2025, Lemay was found guilty and was sentenced to "21 months imprisonment on each count to be served concurrently, followed by two years of supervised release on each count to be served concurrently".

== Artwork ==
Lemay is a self-taught artist who did not begin his artistic career until his mid-thirties. Based in Miami and New York, Lemay works across a multitude of mediums and often cross-pollinates among them; he has melded painting with sculpture, installation, technology, new media, sound, photography, Photoshop, and other mixed media, and has been compared to working in the vein of Rothko and Whistler.

Despite that some of his siblings are artists, Lemay never held a desire to make work, that is, until he returned from war. Only after his service as an Israeli soldier did he find his impulse to create art, which still serves as an outlet of cathartic expression of experiences, subjects, and ideas that haunt him—whether from his time at war, loss of loved ones, or the contemporary social-political climate.

Lemay cites his experience as a navigator in the Israeli army as the “bedrock” of his art, both his subject matter and his impulse to make work. His massive black paintings particularly recall his work as a navigator, when Lemay was forced to rely on his senses and memory, or everything aside from his vision mostly, to move through the night. In his Navigator exhibition at Mark Weiss Gallery in 2012, which received an abundance of press, Lemay painted handwritten letters of fallen soldiers and set these works alongside videos playing on iPads, and megalithic-sized black paintings (mirroring those of Ad Reinhardt), which blurred spoken language with handwritten language with digital language of today. By contrast with technology, Lemay's work with handwritten language pays tribute to the dead by taking the letters of fallen soldiers that were never delivered for the work. Using paint to rewrite the letters further serves as a reference the Hebrew found in medieval paintings.

Lemay has exhibited worldwide in museums and galleries such as Iniciativa FUGAZ, Monumental Callao (Lima Peru), The Museum of Israeli Art, Ramat-Gan (Tel Aviv, Israel), Dimensions of Dialogue, The Museum of Contemporary Art of Rome (Rome), The Contemporary Art Centre of Montenegro (Podgorica, Montenegro), and Stux + Haller Gallery (New York, NY), among many others. He continues to explore new mediums, melding them together with new subjects, ideas, and collaborations. Most recently, Lemay's work has become more politically conscious of the contemporary national and international social landscape.

== Service in the Israeli Army ==
Lemay served as a navigator in the Israeli Army from 1979 until 1982. Working at night, he was charged with determining the enemy's position In 1982, his unit was ambushed in the battle at Beaufort Castle in Nabatieh, Lebanon, where Lemay lost many of his fellow soldiers and friends. This experience is one that has influences his artwork greatly.

== Career ==
In 1984, following a brief period living back in his hometown in Michigan, Lemay moved to New York City and soon lost almost his entire savings of around $4,000 in a three-card monte game outside Grand Central Station. This moment, however, seemed to pave the path for the rest of Lemay's life as an artist and leader of an ever-growing arts institution; after losing the money, Lemay's friend helped him secure a part-time position in the business of moving and storage with Moishe Mana in 1984, during the humble beginnings of Moishe's Moving Systems. From operating with only a few trucks and a couple of men, Moishe's Moving Systems quickly grew to serving as the largest moving company in the tristate area. Success in the moving and storage business compelled Mana and Lemay to offer mini storage, document storage, wine storage, and art storage, which still holds large warehouse spaces in Manhattan, Queens, and the Bronx.
