= Zanna Roberts Rassi =

British journalist

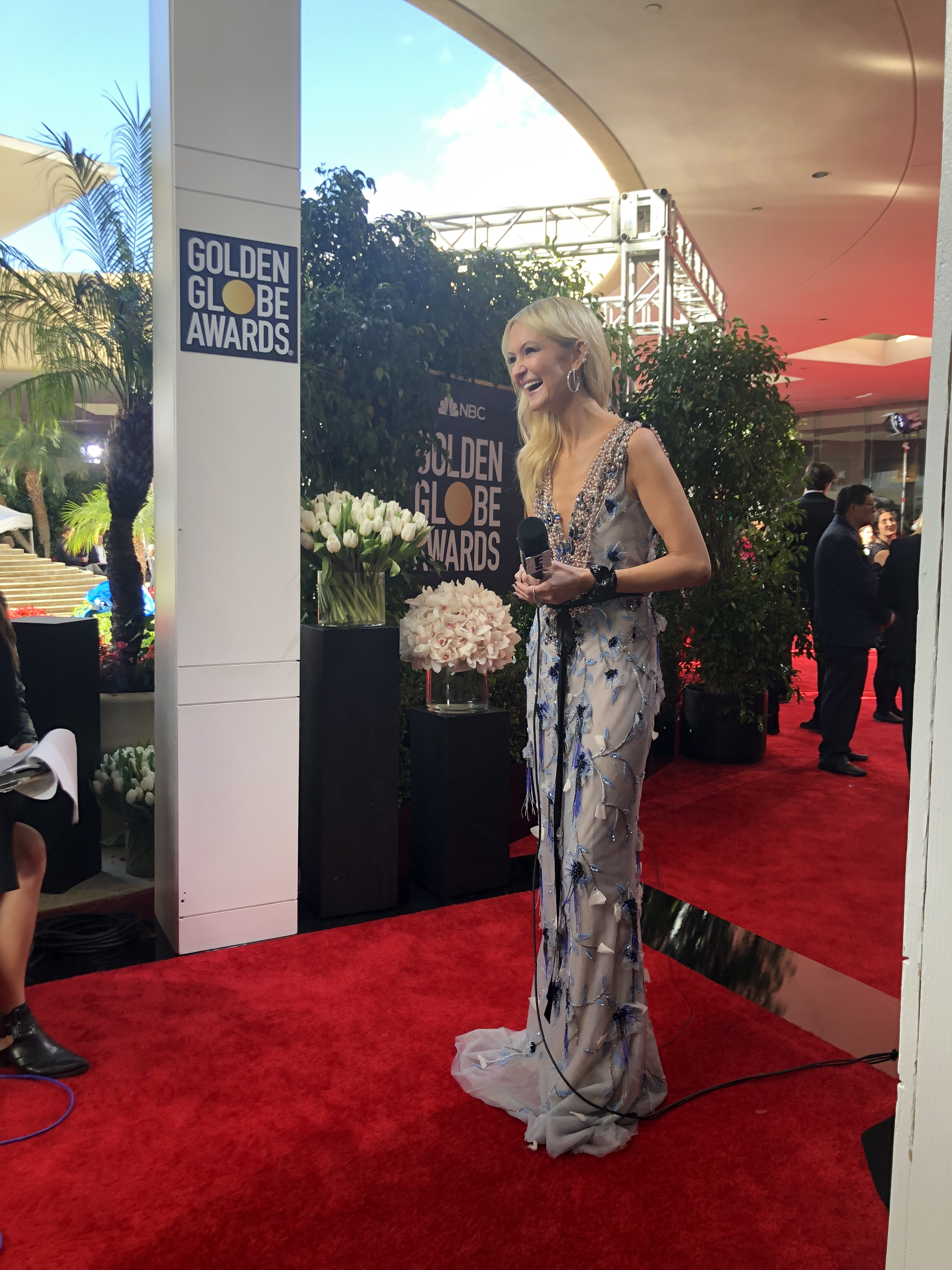
Rassi covering the 2019 Golden Globes red carpet with E! News

Zanna Roberts Rassi is a British born, New York-based fashion, beauty and entertainment journalist and businesswoman. She is a co-founder of Milk Makeup and currently the Fashion-Editor-at-Large for Marie Claire, E! News fashion correspondent, Today Show fashion contributor, and consults for the American retail chain Target as a fashion stylist, along with brands such as Adidas and Victoria's Secret.

== Career ==
Rassi interviews A-list celebs and is part of the E! Live from the Red Carpet team covering the Met Gala, Oscars, Golden Globes, E! People's Choice Awards and Emmy Awards. She also hosts E! News coverage twice a year throughout NYFW. In her role as a contributor on the Today Show, Roberts Rassi hosts style segments, red carpet recaps, and also travelled to cover the 2018 Royal Wedding.

Rassi has appeared as a judge, stylist, and host on Project Runway All Stars, Glam Masters, E!’s Just 1 Thing, and the mini-series Commuter Beauty.

Rassi co-founded the cosmetics company Milk Makeup in 2016 with her husband Mazdack Rassi, Dianna Ruth and Georgie Greville. The brand is cruelty-free, paraben-free and 100% vegan. Styled as clean, cool beauty the brand has won multiple awards including Allures Best of Beauty and Teen Vogue Beauty Game Changers.

== Personal life ==
Rassi lives in New York City with her husband Mazdack Rassi, and together they have twin girls Rumi and Juno.
