= Marwa Arsanios =

American artist

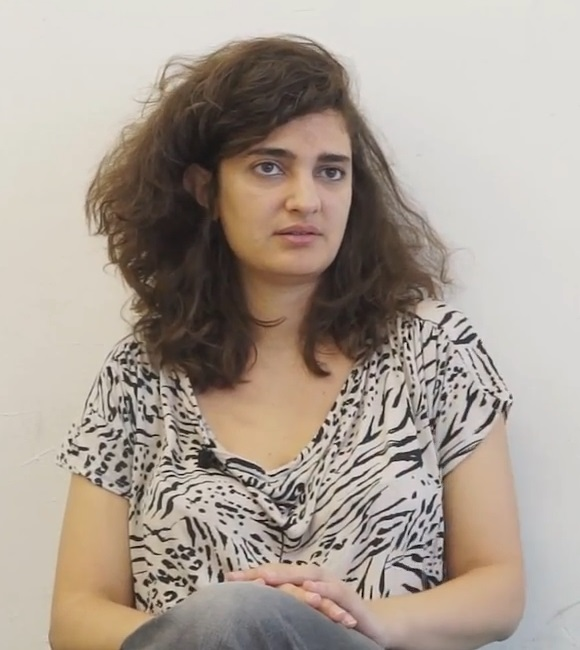
- Arsanios in 2013
- Born: 1978 (age 47–48); Beirut, Lebanon
- Education: University of the Arts London; Jan Van Eyck Academie

Marwa Arsanios is an artist, researcher and filmmaker from Beirut.

== Biography ==
Marwa Arsanios is an artist, filmmaker and researcher from Beirut. She reconsiders politics of the mid-twentieth century from a contemporary perspective, with a particular focus on gender relations, urbanism and industrialization. She approaches research collaboratively and seeks to work across disciplines.

She has been a fellow at Akademie Schloss Solitude, Stuttgart, Germany (2014) and Tokyo Wonder Site, Tokyo Arts and Space (2010), and is the co-founder of 98weeks Research Project.

Arsanios received a Master of Fine Art, University of the Arts London (2007) and was a researcher in the Fine Art Department, Jan Van Eyck Academie, Maastricht, The Netherlands (2011–2012). She holds a phd from the Akademie der bildenden Kunst in Vienna.

== Exhibitions ==
Arsanios has had solo exhibitions at Skuc gallery in Lujubljana (2018) at the Beirut Art Center (2017); Hammer Museum, Los Angeles (2016); Witte de With Center for Contemporary Art, Rotterdam (2016); Kunsthalle Lissabon, Lisbon (2015) and Art in General, New York (2015).

She has also been included in group exhibitions, including the Berlin Biennial (2020), Warsaw Biennial (2019), Sharjah Biennial (2019), Gwangju Biennial (2018), Lulea biennial (2018), From Ear to Ear to Eye, Nottingham Contemporary, UK (2017); Home Return, Maxxi Museum, Rome (2017); Let’s Talk about the Weather, Sursock Museum, Beirut (2016); Here and now, Ludwig Museum, Cologne (2016); Thessaloniki Biennial (2015); Home Works Forum, Ashkal Alwan, Beirut (2010, 2013, 2015); Here and Elsewhere, New Museum, New York (2014); 55th Venice Biennale (2013); Meeting Points 7 – Ten Thousand Wiles and a Hundred Thousand Tricks, M HKA, Antwerp (2013); In Other Words, nGbK, Berlin (2012) and 12th Istanbul Biennial (2011).

Screenings of her videos have taken place at the Centre Georges Pompidou, Paris (2011, 2017); Berlin International Film Festival (2010, 2015); Copenhagen dox (2018).

== Awards ==
- Georges de Beauregard award at FID Marseille (2019): Winner
- Special Prize of the Pinchuk Future Generation Art Prize (2012): Winner
- Paulo Cunha e Silva Art Prize (2017): Nominated
- Han Nefkens Foundation award (2014): Nominated

== Work ==
In the past ten years, Arsanios has been looking at the material residues of violence (from architecture to books, magazines, ephemeras, to dance, an anthropological PhD thesis and most recently the appropriation of land into the sea through the material use of garbage and rubble and the financial profit made out of garbage). What comes out of these investigations (the artworks themselves) might not be representation of violence per se, they are rather an attempt to look at hidden or undetected violence whether structural, ideological or personal. In the past three years, Arsanios has been working at the intersection of land, ecology and feminism. Her research moves between, on the one hand, political questions on the way ideological mechanisms permeate land, space, time, systems of justice and subjecthood, and on the other hand aesthetic thought that requires another kind of lens, an actual camera lens, a film set, a sound recorder and light, while searching for a few adequate positions from which to read the land, places, legalities and subjecthoods. She has been working between different strands of New Materialism, historical materialism, postcolonial/decolonial theory and Marxist feminist politics.
