= Kumba (Swedish rapper) =

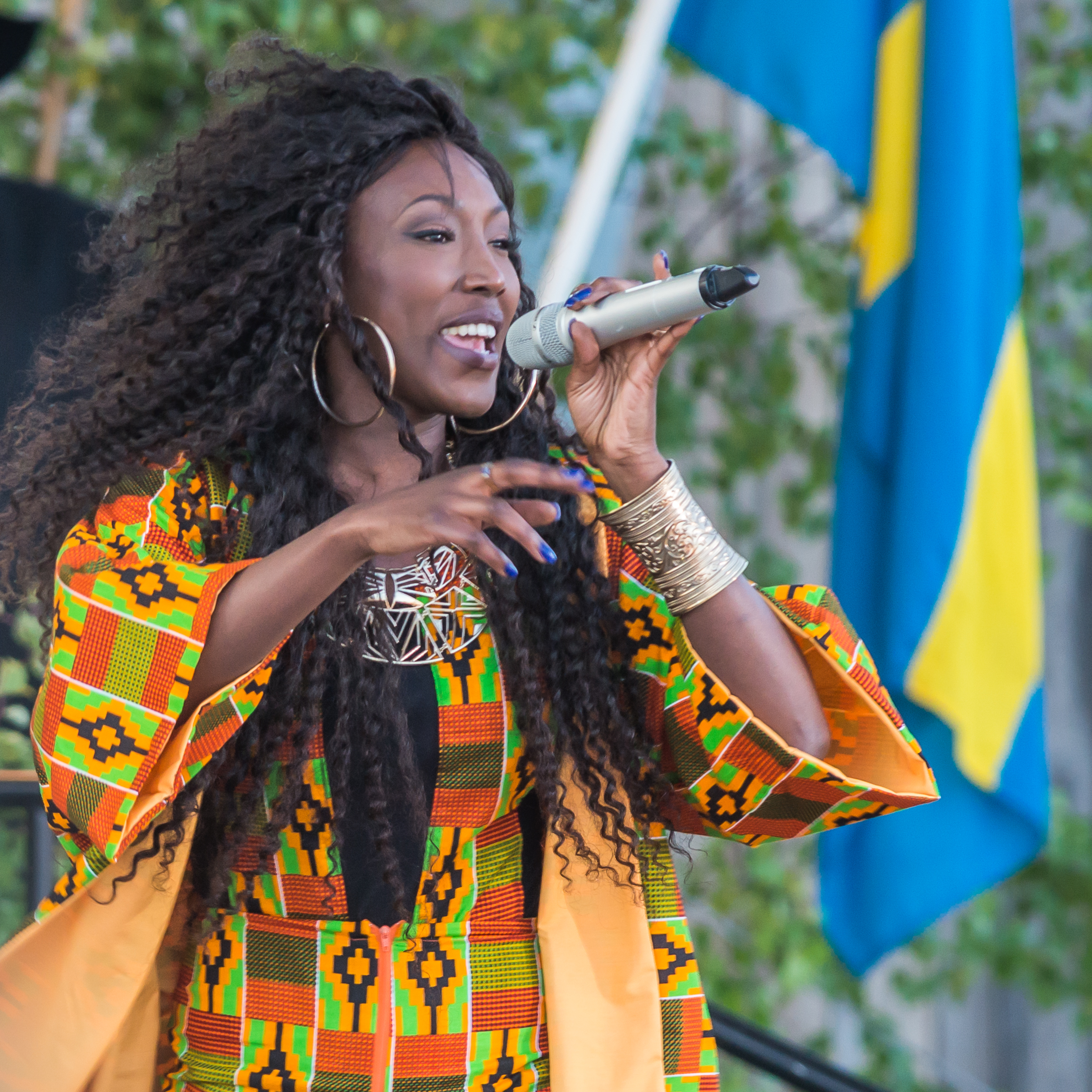
- Kumba during the National Day of Sweden celebrations in 2015

Background information
- Birth name: Kumba M'bye
- Born: 5 February 1983 (age 42); Gambia
- Genres: Rap
- Occupation(s): Singer, rapper
- Labels: Redline Records

Kumba M'bye (born 5 February 1983), known mononymously as Kumba, is a Swedish rap artist and former model.

== Biography ==
Kumba grew up in Malmö and Landskrona.

In the early 2000s she started rapping and writing lyrics in English. During the summer of 2013 the rapper Stor heard her rapping and invited her to do an audition at the record label Redline Records. Inspired by the rappers Linda Pira and Lilla Namo she started writing lyrics in Swedish.

In 2014, she collaborated with Pira on her music single "Knäpper mina fingrar". This led to Kumba being able to participate in a hiphop concert at the Royal Dramatic Theatre for female rappers only. She has also participated in the Sveriges Radio show En kärleksattack på svensk hiphop. In 2014, her music single "I staden" was released for Redline Records. At the 2015 Kingsizegalan, she was nominated for Best Newcomer of 2015.

In 2015, Kumba participated in the TV-show Lyckliga gatan broadcast on TV4 where she had to make a new version of the Kicki Danielsson song "Bra vibrationer", while Danielsson made a new version of Kumbas song "I staden".

Kumba has also been modelling, having participated as a contestant on the first season of Top Model where she was eliminated on the fifth episode of Sweden pre-selection round.

== Singles ==
Title	Year	Peak chart positions	Album
Title	Year	SWE	Album
"Bra vibrationer"	2015	68	Non-album single
