= Evolve Motorcycles =

American electric scooter and motorcycle manufacturer

- Company type: Private
- Industry: Automotive
- Genre: Electric vehicles
- Founded: 2008
- Defunct: 2015; 11 years ago
- Fate: Closed circa 2015
- Headquarters: Jersey City, NJ, United States
- Area served: United States, Western Europe
- Key people: Benjamin Plum, Mazdack Rassi and Lex Kendall
- Products: Electric scooters and motorcycles

Evolve Motorcycles was an American privately owned and operated electric scooter and motorcycle manufacturer and distributor based in Jersey City, NJ, with assembly and distribution facilities located in Brooklyn, New York.

== History ==
Evolve Motorcycles was established by Benjamin Plum, Mazdack Rassi and Lex Kendall as a concept project c. 2008, started its own R&D in 2009 and registered in 2010. The company was based out of Jersey City, NJ with branches registered in several states including Hawaii, Indiana, Minnesota, Maryland, California, Florida and New York. The company distributed vehicles from Williamsburg, Brooklyn. From the beginning, Evolve Motorcycles developed new series of electric scooters and motorcycles with integrated lithium-ion battery systems instead of conventional motor engines. In October 2011, Evolve launched its product line with three all-electric motor scooters made from US components: Evolve Helium, Evolve Neon and Evolve Titanium. The vehicles had speeds of 40 mph for the Helium, 50 mph for the Neon, and 70 mph for the Titanium, and a price range starting at $2,900 for the Helium, and $5,400 for the Titanium. Evolve models were presented at various motorcycle exhibitions in the US and Western Europe, including the Milan International Motorcycle Show (EICMA) and The New York Motorcycle Show, among others.

=== Xenon ===
In 2011, the company revealed its new flagship model Xenon Electric Bike, a futuristic replica of the Tron Lightcycle seen in the Tron: Legacy science fiction film, at the fashion event in New York, which took place in Milk Studios, a media production company also established by Mazdack Rassi. Designed by Parker Brothers Choppers, it had a 40,000 W motor and a 60 or 120 Ah LiFe PO4 battery with a top speed of 70 mph.

=== Lithium ===
Designed by Parker Brothers Choppers, a more conventional Lithium model was presented at the 2011 EICMA show in Milan. The bike had a 40,000 W motor and a 96 V battery with a top speed of 100 mph and a maximum range of 100 mi on a 3.5-hour charge.

== Models (specs) ==
Model	Launch	Seats	Power (hp) (kW)	Max speed (km/h) (mph)	Battery (kWh)	Range^{1} (km) (mi)
Helium	2011	2	2.4 1.5	64 40	2	64 40
Neon	2011	2	4.8 3	80 50	3	80 50
Titanium	2011	2	8 5	112 70	5	112 70
Lithium	2011 / 2012	2	54 40	161 100	40	161 100
Xenon	2011 / 2012	2	27 20	112 70	20	80 50
XR	2011 / 2012	2	54 40	161 100	40	161 100^{2}

^{1}Sources: ^{2}Based on speed and weight

== See also ==
- Electric motorcycles and scooters
- List of motorcycles by type of engine
- Plug-in electric vehicle
