= Top Model Curves season 1 =

Season of television series

Top Model Curves
- Season 1
- No. of episodes: 24

Release
- Original network: TV3
- Original release: August 30 – November 16, 2016

Top Model Curves, season 1 was the first season of Top Model Curves. The first season features eighteen plus size models, who competed together for approximately twelve weeks. The first season aired from August to November 2016 in Denmark, Sweden and Norway.

The winner of the competition was 19-year-old Ronja Manfredsson from Sweden.

== Contestants ==
(ages stated are at start of contest)

From	Contestant	Age	Height	Size	Hometown	Finish	Place
Sweden	Janina Karlman	20	1.79 m (5 ft 10 1/2 in)	40	Arjeplog	Week 1	18
Norway	Martine Halvorsen	18	1.73 m (5 ft 8 in)	42	Nesodden	Week 1	17 (quit)
Denmark	Marlene 'MC' Christensen	27	1.69 m (5 ft 6 1/2 in)	42	Vejle	Week 1	16
Norway	Linda Selmoni	18	1.78 m (5 ft 10 in)	40	Jotunheimen	Week 2	15
Denmark	Anne-Mette Tassing	25	1.69 m (5 ft 6 1/2 in)	42-44	Aarhus	Week 3	14
Sweden	Mette Elofsson	21	1.65 m (5 ft 5 in)	42-44	Stockholm	Week 4	13
Norway	Charlotte Skogrand Bø	18	1.77 m (5 ft 9 1/2 in)	44	Oslo	Week 5	12
Norway	Guro Mangen	20	1.70 m (5 ft 7 in)	43	Oslo	Week 6	11
Denmark	Helena Thompson	20	1.68 m (5 ft 6 in)	42-44	Randers	Week 7	10
Denmark	Kathleen Ladani	23	1.85 m (6 ft 1 in)	40	Lyngby	Week 9	9
Sweden	Paulina Perger	19	1.71 m (5 ft 7 1/2 in)	44	Helsingborg	Week 10	8
Norway	Benedicte Haugaard	25	1.72 m (5 ft 7 1/2 in)	45	Drammen	Week 10	7
Sweden	Lovisa Reuter	27	1.74 m (5 ft 8 1/2 in)	42-44	Stockholm	Week 11	6
Sweden	Maria Esbo	21	1.84 m (6 ft 1/2 in)	41	Stockholm	Week 12	5
Norway	Jannie Gefle	25	1.74 m (5 ft 8 1/2 in)	42	Oslo	Week 12	4
Denmark	Aida Almquist Sowe	23	1.82 m (5 ft 11 1/2 in)	44-46	Copenhagen	Week 12	3
Denmark	Malene Riis Sørensen	23	1.80 m (5 ft 11 in)	42	Valby	Week 12	2
Sweden	Ronja Manfredsson	19	1.80 m (5 ft 11 in)	42	Gräsö	Week 12	1

== Episodes ==
=== Week 1 ===
Original airdate: August 30, 2016 & August 31, 2016

- Eliminated outside of judging panel: Janina Karlman

Groups
Anne-Mette, Charlotte, Guro, Helena & MC
Benedicte, Jannie, Kathleen, Linda, Martine & Ronja
Aida, Lovisa, Malene, Maria, Mette & Paulina

- Best photo: Aida Almquist Sowe, Lovisa Reuter, Malene Riis Sørensen, Maria Esbo, Mette Elofsson & Paulina Perger
- Quit: Martine Halvorsen
- Bottom two: Helena Thompson & MC Christensen
- Eliminated: MC Christensen

=== Week 2 ===
Original airdate: September 6, 2016 & September 7, 2016

- First call-out/Best photo: Malene Riis Sørensen
- Eliminated: Linda Selmoni
- Bottom two: Benedicte Haugaard & Helena Thompson
- Eliminated: None

=== Week 3 ===
Original airdate: September 13, 2016 & September 14, 2016

- Challenge winner: Aida Almquist Sowe, Charlotte Skogrand Bø, Jannie Gefle, Maria Esbo & Mette Elofsson

Pairs	Safe	Unsafe
Aida & Maria	Maria	Aida
Anne-Mette & Paulina	—	Both
Benedicte & Helena	Helena	Benedicte
Charlotte & Malene	Malene	Charlotte
Guro & Mette	Mette	Guro
Jannie & Lovisa	Lovisa	Jannie
Kathleen & Ronja	Both	—

- Immune: Helena Thompson, Kathleen Ladani, Lovisa Reuter, Malene Riis Sørensen, Maria Esbo, Mette Elofsson & Ronja Manfredsson
- Best photo: Kathleen Ladani & Ronja Manfredsson
- First call-out: Ronja Manfredsson
- Campaign winner: Ronja Manfredsson
- Bottom two: Anne-Mette Tassing & Paulina Perger
- Eliminated: Anne-Mette Tassing

=== Week 4 ===
Original airdate: September 21, 2016 & September 22, 2016

- Challenge winner: Kathleen Ladani
- First call-out/Best photo: Paulina Perger
- Bottom two: Charlotte Skogrand Bø & Mette Elofsson
- Eliminated: Mette Elofsson

=== Week 5 ===
Original airdate: September 28, 2016 & September 29, 2016

- Challenge winner: Aida Almquist Sowe, Benedicte Haugaard, Charlotte Skogrand Bø, Kathleen Ladani, Lovisa Reuter & Malene Riis Sørensen
- First call-out: Guro Mangen & Maria Esbo
- Best photo: Helena Thompson
- Eliminated: Charlotte Skogrand Bø
- Bottom two: Kathleen Ladani & Ronja Manfredsson
- Eliminated: None

=== Week 6 ===
Original airdate: October 5, 2016 & October 6, 2016

- Challenge winner: Benedicte Haugaard
- First call-out/Best photo: Kathleen Ladani
- Bottom two: Guro Mangen & Paulina Perger
- Eliminated: Guro Mangen

=== Week 7 ===
Original airdate: October 12, 2016 & October 13, 2016

- Challenge winner: Aida Almquist Sowe
- First call-out: Malene Riis Sørensen & Ronja Manfredsson
- Best photo: Aida Almquist Sowe
- Campaign winner: Aida Almquist Sowe
- Bottom two: Helena Thompson & Kathleen Ladani
- Eliminated: Helena Thompson

=== Week 8 ===
Original airdate: October 18, 2016 & October 19, 2016

- Challenge winner: Ronja Manfredsson
- First call-out: Ronja Manfredsson
- Bottom two: Benedicte Haugaard & Kathleen Ladani
- Eliminated: None

=== Week 9 ===
Original airdate: October 25, 2016 & October 26, 2016

- Challenge winner: Lovisa Reuter
- First call-out: Ronja Manfredsson
- Best photo: Aida Almquist Sowe
- Bottom two: Kathleen Ladani & Paulina Perger
- Eliminated: Kathleen Ladani

=== Week 10 ===
Original airdate: November 1, 2016 & November 2, 2016

- Eliminated outside of judging panel: Paulina Perger
- Challenge winner: Ronja Manfredsson
- First call-out/Best photo: Maria Esbo
- Bottom two: Benedicte Haugaard & Lovisa Reuter
- Eliminated: Benedicte Haugaard

=== Week 11 ===
Original airdate: November 8, 2016 & November 9, 2016

==== First panel ====
- Challenge winner: Malene Riis Sørensen
- First call-out/Best photo: Malene Riis Sørensen
- Bottom two: Aida Almquist Sowe & Lovisa Reuter
- Eliminated: Lovisa Reuter

==== Second panel ====
- Challenge winner: None
- First call-out/Best photo: Ronja Manfredsson
- Bottom two: Aida Almquist Sowe & Jannie Gefle
- Eliminated: None

=== Week 12 ===
Original airdate: November 15, 2016 & November 16, 2016

==== First panel ====
- Eliminated: Maria Esbo
- Bottom two: Jannie Gefle & Malene Riis Sørensen
- Eliminated: None

==== Second panel ====
- Eliminated outside of judging panel: Jannie Gefle
- Eliminated: Aida Almquist Sowe
- Final two: Malene Riis Sørensen & Ronja Manfredsson
- Scandinavia's Next Top Model: Ronja Manfredsson

== Call out order ==
Order	Episodes													
Order	1 (Note: In week 1, Janina was eliminated after being deemed the worst in the runway challenge. Furthermore at judging, Martine decided to quit the competition.)	2	3 (Note: In week 3, half of the contestants were immune from elimination after having been deemed the best in their group photos.)	4	5	6	7	8	9	10 (Note: In week 10, Paulina was eliminated after the conclusion of the week's previous panel due to her poor behavior.)	11 (Note: In week 11, there were two separate panels. One on Tuesday and one on Wednesday.)		12 (Note: In week 12, there were also two separate panels. One on Tuesday and one on Wednesday.)	
1	Aida; Lovisa; Malene; Maria; Mette; Paulina	Malene	Kathleen; Ronja	Paulina	Guro; Maria	Kathleen	Malene; Ronja	Ronja	Ronja	Maria	Malene	Ronja	Maria	Ronja
2	Aida; Lovisa; Malene; Maria; Mette; Paulina	Aida; Anne-Mette; Charlotte; Guro; Jannie; Lovisa; Maria; Mette; Paulina; Ronja	Kathleen; Ronja	Benedicte	Guro; Maria	Jannie	Malene; Ronja	Malene	Aida	Aida	Ronja	Maria	Aida; Ronja	Malene
3	Aida; Lovisa; Malene; Maria; Mette; Paulina	Aida; Anne-Mette; Charlotte; Guro; Jannie; Lovisa; Maria; Mette; Paulina; Ronja	Mette	Malene	Lovisa; Malene	Benedicte	Paulina	Aida	Jannie	Ronja	Maria	Malene	Aida; Ronja	Aida
4	Aida; Lovisa; Malene; Maria; Mette; Paulina	Aida; Anne-Mette; Charlotte; Guro; Jannie; Lovisa; Maria; Mette; Paulina; Ronja	Guro	Maria	Lovisa; Malene	Malene	Aida	Jannie	Benedicte	Jannie	Jannie	Aida; Jannie	Jannie; Malene	Jannie
5	Aida; Lovisa; Malene; Maria; Mette; Paulina	Aida; Anne-Mette; Charlotte; Guro; Jannie; Lovisa; Maria; Mette; Paulina; Ronja	Maria	Aida	Helena	Helena	Lovisa	Lovisa	Malene	Malene	Aida	Aida; Jannie	Jannie; Malene	
6	Aida; Lovisa; Malene; Maria; Mette; Paulina	Aida; Anne-Mette; Charlotte; Guro; Jannie; Lovisa; Maria; Mette; Paulina; Ronja	Aida	Lovisa	Jannie	Ronja	Jannie; Maria	Maria	Lovisa; Maria	Lovisa	Lovisa			
7	Martine	Aida; Anne-Mette; Charlotte; Guro; Jannie; Lovisa; Maria; Mette; Paulina; Ronja	Helena	Helena	Aida; Paulina	Lovisa	Jannie; Maria	Paulina	Lovisa; Maria	Benedicte				
8	Benedicte; Jannie; Kathleen; Linda; Ronja	Aida; Anne-Mette; Charlotte; Guro; Jannie; Lovisa; Maria; Mette; Paulina; Ronja	Benedicte	Ronja	Aida; Paulina	Aida	Benedicte	Benedicte; Kathleen	Paulina	Paulina				
9	Benedicte; Jannie; Kathleen; Linda; Ronja	Aida; Anne-Mette; Charlotte; Guro; Jannie; Lovisa; Maria; Mette; Paulina; Ronja	Malene	Jannie	Benedicte	Maria	Kathleen	Benedicte; Kathleen	Kathleen					
10	Benedicte; Jannie; Kathleen; Linda; Ronja	Aida; Anne-Mette; Charlotte; Guro; Jannie; Lovisa; Maria; Mette; Paulina; Ronja	Charlotte	Kathleen	Charlotte	Paulina	Helena							
11	Benedicte; Jannie; Kathleen; Linda; Ronja	Aida; Anne-Mette; Charlotte; Guro; Jannie; Lovisa; Maria; Mette; Paulina; Ronja	Lovisa	Guro	Kathleen	Guro								
12	Benedicte; Jannie; Kathleen; Linda; Ronja	Kathleen	Jannie	Charlotte	Ronja									
13	Guro	Linda	Paulina	Mette										
14	Charlotte	Benedicte; Helena	Anne-Mette											
15	Anne-Mette	Benedicte; Helena												
16	Helena													
17	MC													
18	Janina													

The contestant was eliminated at judging panel
The contestant won best picture of the week
The contestant was part of a non-elimination bottom two.
The contestant was eliminated outside of judging panel
The contestant quit the competition
The contestant was immune from elimination
The contestant won the competition

=== Photo shoot guide ===
- Week 1 photo shoot: Posing in groups with sea animals
- Week 2 photo shoot: Sightseeing
- Week 3 photo shoot: Babyliss hair campaign in pairs
- Week 4 photo shoots: Gymnasts; surfers
- Week 5 photo shoots: Eyes above water; femme fatales
- Week 6 photo shoot: Portraying David Bowie & James Bond
- Week 7 photo shoot: Posing in lingerie
- Week 8 photo shoot: Robyn Lawley swimwear with male models
- Week 9 photo shoots: Posing in a little black dress; recreating famous magazine covers
- Week 10 photo shoot: Helly Hansen winter collection
- Week 11 photo shoots: Couture dresses; posing with a horse
- Week 12 photo shoot: Cover shoot for SLiNK magazine
