= Ohad Ashkenazi =

Israeli TV and theater director

Ohad (Odi) Ashkenazi
- אוהד אשכנזי
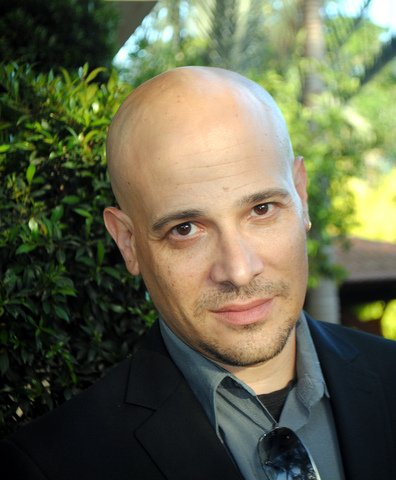
- Born: December 22, 1971 (age 54); Kireon, Israel

Ohad (Odi) Ashkenazi (Hebrew: אוהד (אודי) אשכנזי; born December 22, 1971) is an Israeli TV and theatre director, comedy and entertainment creator, producer and writer.

== Early life and education ==
Ashkenazi was born in the city of Kireon, Israel to Orina Raanan and Professor Israel Ashkenazi. His maternal grandfather was Mordechai Raanan; the former Irgun district commander in Jerusalem and his paternal grandfather was Shlomo Pinchas Ashkenazi; author and researcher of Judaism.

Growing up, Ashkenazi was a member of the Israeli National theater group, "Habima Teen", and also a part of "Friends of the Habima" a society of theater professionals engaging the Habima Theater resources with special theater projects throughout the community.

Ashkenazi served in the Israel Defense Forces (IDF) as a paramedic. In 1993, Ashkenazi attended the Beit Zvi School of Performing Arts; a leading arts academy in Israel. In 1994, he was awarded with a scholarship from the America-Israel Cultural Foundation and relocated to the United Kingdom, where he achieved his director diploma at the Drama Studio London.

== TV career ==
In 1999, while he was already part of the Beit Lessin Theater team in Tel Aviv, Ashkenazi was chosen to direct the Israeli Theater Academy Award ceremony. The success of this event led Ashkenazi to direct the next two consecutive annual ceremonies. In 2000, he directed the annual Golden Heart Fundraiser event: "Variety Children Organization" produced by the Reshet Broadcasting Company. In 2001, he returned once again to direct the Annual Golden Heart ceremony as well as the Israeli film Academy Award. That same year, Ashkenazi directed the Keshet Broadcast Company "People of the Year Awards". In 2002, he directed the "Sports People of the Year Awards" for the Israeli Sports Channel as well as the talent show "Bravo", produced by the Children's Network Channel and the Telad Broadcasting Company.

During the 2002–2003 TV season, Ashkenazi began his role as the editor for the entertainment talk show "Erev Adir", hosted by Adir Miller for Reshet. He proceeded to work with Miller to develop the hit comedy sitcom, "Ramzor".

Between the years 2004–2006, Ashkenazi served as Head Manager of the Israeli Comedy Channel "Bip (channel)", owned by Keshet Broadcast Company and Hot, an Israeli cable communication group. During that time, he created the successful satire show, "The Strip" (HaRetsua in Hebrew), hosted by Uri Gottlieb. The show lasted 4 years and 189 episodes.

Between the years 2005–2006, Ashkenazi created the Ali G inspired comedy show "Pascal's World". During this time, as Bip Channel Head Manager, he also contributed to the following successful comedy shows: "The Maestro", a reality TV show that followed the life of legendary Israeli Pop icon, Tzvika Pik; "Double Date", a wacky dating show; "Fight for Your Rights", Israel's first ever wrestling show, and "Yom Tov", a stand-up comedy and sketch marathon, starring top Israeli stand-up comedians.

Between the years 2006–2007, Ashkenazi was part of the Keshet Broadcast Company team developing original comedy, entertainment, and talk shows. In 2008, Ashkenazi once again joined forces with the Reshet Broadcasting Company and co-created with Yoav Gross the hit show "Comedians at Work". The successful show was placed on prime time television for seven consecutive seasons. The format was sold and later produced in Russia, France and Germany. In 2008, Ashkenazi continued to create and edit another hit comedy show, "Shavua Sof". Other successful shows Ashkenazi created for the Reshet Broadcasting Company include: "Oblivious", a game show, "Family Business" and "Power of 10". In August 2010, Ashkenazi was appointed Head Manager of the Israeli division of Viacom's Comedy Central Channel. He was in charge of the successful launch of the channel in Israel in 2011, and continued to develop more original comedy shows for the channel including: "Comeback", "The Wedding Seasons", the TV sitcom "Red Band"(Season 2) and a comedy strip called, "The Comedy Central University". Ashkenazi played a pivotal role in the acquisition of future, English-speaking Comedy Central shows.

In 2012, under Ashkenazi's management, the Comedy Central Channel aired two more original comedy shows: "Outlawed", a stand-up comedy show with Roei Levi and Lucy Aharish, and "Singles", a humoristic dating show. That same year, Ashkenazi co-developed the innovative sketch show "The Green Project" alongside acclaimed animator Eyal Be. The show format was later sold to Lithuania, Uruguay, China and other countries throughout the world. It was also in this year that Ashkenazi was invited to join the International Development Team of Comedy Central, led by Jill Offman, the International Head of the Comedy Central brand.

In 2013, Ashkenazi developed the reality sitcom "The Life of Avi The Singer", and the talk show, "Creatures of the Night". In 2014, Ashkenazi began collaborating with internet celebrities and produced the comedy project, "Zero Movie", by internet comedians Or Paz and Tom Trager. That year, Ashkenazi also produced the dating game show, "Babe Magnet".

== Theater career ==
Ashkenazi took his first steps in theater in 1994, as an Assistant Director of the musical "Grease", starring Aki Avni, Zvika Hadar and others. He continued as an Assistant Director of the play, "The Importance of Being Earnest", starring Hanna Maron. Upon his return to Israel following his studies in England, Ashkenazi became one of the youngest in Israel to achieve a Director's role in a repertory theater. His choice of plays often touched controversial subjects. He directed the play "Burning Blue" by D.M.W. Greer. The play, starring Lior Ashkenazi, and produced by Beit Lessin Theater, dealt with the delicate subject of homosexuality in the American Navy.

In 1998, Ashkenazi translated and directed the musical, "Assassins", by Stephen Sondheim. The extravagant production was also launched at the Beit Lessin Theater. Later that year, the show won the Israeli Theater Academy Award for Best Musical. That same year, Ashkenazi wrote "Kaytek the Wizard", an adaptation of Janusz Korczak book of the same name. In 2000, Ashkenazi directed the Pulitzer Prize winning play, "Dinner with Friends" by Donald Margulies, The play was nominated for Best Comedy Award. In 2002, Ashkenazi directed the Be'er Sheva Theater production "Boy Gets Girl" by Rebecca Gilman.

In 2014, Ashkenazi directed a concert version of the musical "Damascus Square" in New York City. The play, written by Sarah Hirsch and Shai Baitel, starred Broadway actors Richard Blake and Tovah Feldush. The musical was displayed on stages at the famous Waldorf Astoria and the Broadway cabaret club "54 Below"

== Commercial Theater career ==
In 1997, Ashkenazi wrote the musical "Hugo", which was produced by the Tevet Production Company. The same year, he also directed the "Oleg Popov Circus" Israel tour, hosted by stars of the Israeli Children's Channel and produced by Talit Productions. In 1999, he translated and directed the musical "I Love You, You're Perfect, Now Change", a musical comedy with lyrics by Joe DiPietro and music by Jimmy Roberts; produced by the Yochelman-Asher Production Company.

== Personal life ==
Ashkenazi met his wife, actress Maria Cregeen when she played the main role in the play "Games in the Backyard", which he directed as part of his final project for The Drama Studio London. Maria Cregeen is the daughter of Peter Cregeen; A British Television executive. The couple have been married since 1998 and have three children together.
