= Top Model (Scandinavian TV series) season 2 =

Top Model
- Season 2
- No. of episodes: 12

Release
- Original network: TV3
- Original release: September 2005 – November 2005

Season chronology
- ← Previous; Season 1 Next → Season 3

Top Model, season 2 (or Top Model: Paris) was the second season of Top Model. It was broadcast on TV3 in Denmark, Norway and Sweden by Viasat from September to November 2005. The winner of the competition 17-year-old Frøydis Elvenes from Narvik. The runners-up were Anna Nørgaard from Højbjerg and Arwen Bergröm from Sundsvall.

== Call-out order ==
Call-out order
Order	Episodes			
Order	8	9	10	12
1				Frøydis
2				Anna; Arwen
3				Anna; Arwen
4			Janni; Kristine; Tine Holm	
5			Janni; Kristine; Tine Holm	
6			Janni; Kristine; Tine Holm	
7		Karin; Louise		
8		Karin; Louise		
9	Mikaela			

The contestant was eliminated
The contestant won the competition

== Norway's pre-selection ==
Norway's contestants

Norway's competition was hosted by Kathrine Sørland, who was also the head judge until the three countries merged and Cynthia Garrett took over. The first episode was aired in Norway on 5 September 2005, with the finale being aired on 21 November. The first episode saw nine contestants selected for the competition. The final three girls chosen to compete in the final competition with Denmark and Sweden were Frøydis Elvenes, Karin Santini and Kristine Øverby. The last contestant standing was Elvenes, who went on to win the competition. As part of her prizes, Elvenes received a cover and multiple-page spread in FHM.

=== Final 9 ===
Contestant	Age	Hometown	Finish
Nazila Shirindel	20	Bergen	Episode 2
Annette Kjær	22	—N/a	Episode 3
Nora Møller	21	—N/a	Episode 4
Elise Måge	21	Haugesund	Episode 5
Sarah Mohamud	18	Karmøy	Episode 6
Sandra Otteraaen	18	Bergen	Episode 7

=== Final 3 ===
Contestant	Age	Hometown	Finish	Place
Karin Santini	19	Bekkestua	Episode 8	9–7
Kristine Øverby	20	Aurskog	Episode 10	6–4
Frøydis Elvenes	17	Narvik	Episode 12	1

== Denmark's pre-selection ==
Denmark's competition was hosted by Anne Pedersen who was also the head judge until the three countries merged and Cynthia Garrett took over. The first episode was aired in Denmark on 6 September 2005, with the finale being aired on 22 November. The first episode saw nine contestants selected for the competition. The final three girls chosen to compete in the final competition with Norway and Sweden were Anna Nørgaard, Louise Falkenblad and Tine Holm Riis. The last contestant standing was Nørgaard, who was runner-up overall.

=== Contestants ===
(ages stated are at start of contest)

==== Final 9 ====
Contestant	Age	Hometown	Finish
Mikaela K. Ibsen	19	Risskov	Episode 2
Tanja Johnsen	20	Copenhagen	Episode 3
Line Bang	19	Copenhagen	Episode 4
Sofie Thrane	22	Odense	Episode 5
Heidi Helm Larsen	21	Holstebro	Episode 6
Lise M. Andersen	23	Herlev	Episode 7

==== Final 3 ====
Contestant	Age	Hometown	Finish	Place
Louise Falkenblad	19	Herlev	Episode 8	9–7
Tine Holm Riis	21	Aarhus	Episode 10	6–4
Anna Nørgaard	18	Højbjerg	Episode 12	3–2

=== Judges ===
- Anne Pedersen (host)
- Camilla Frank (Costume editor)
- Helen Dohlman (runway show choreographer)
- Jeppe Mydtskov (Unique Models)
- Mariana Verkerk (guest judge, posing and catwalk coach)

== Sweden's pre-selection ==
Sweden's contestants

Sweden's competition was hosted by Mini Andén, who was also the head judge until the three countries merged and Cynthia Garrett took over. The first episode was aired in Sweden on 14 September 2005, with the finale being aired on 30 November. The first episode saw nine contestants selected for the competition. The final three girls chosen to compete in the final competition with Denmark and Norway were Arwen Bergström, Janni Juntunen and Mikaela Källgren. The last contestant standing was Bergström, who was runner-up overall.

=== Contestants ===
(ages stated are at start of contest)

==== Final 9 ====
Contestant	Age	Hometown	Finish
Fahrie Berisha	19	Stockholm	Episode 2
Charlotte Treschow	22	Stockholm	Episode 3
Anna Maria Moström † (Note: In October 2014, contestant Anna Maria Moström died after colliding with a bus while cycling in New York.)	20	Kungsör	Episode 4
Jazzmine Berger	18	Järfälla	Episode 5
Maria Lindgren	22	Gothenburg	Episode 6
Emelie Törnqvist	20	Stockholm	Episode 7

==== Final 3 ====
Contestant	Age	Hometown	Finish	Place
Mikaela Källgren	19	Bjursås	Episode 8	9–7
Janni Juntunen	21	Stockholm	Episode 10	6–4
Mikaela "Arwen" Bergström	18	Sundsvall	Episode 12	3–2

== Photo shoot guide ==
- Photo shoot 1: Workout in Paris
- Photo shoot 2: In spider's web
- Photo shoot 3: Water advert at the Eiffel Tower
- Photo shoot 4: Disco balls & bags
- Photo shoot 5: Angels & devils
- Photo shoot 6: Marie Antoinette style in Versailles
- Photo shoot 7: Bikinis in St. Tropez
- Photo shoot 8: Group photo with dogs
- Photo shoot 9: Moulin Rouge
- Photo shoot 10: Eiffel Tower glamour
