= Yigal Ozeri =

Israeli artist (born 1958)

Yigal Ozeri יגאל עוזרי
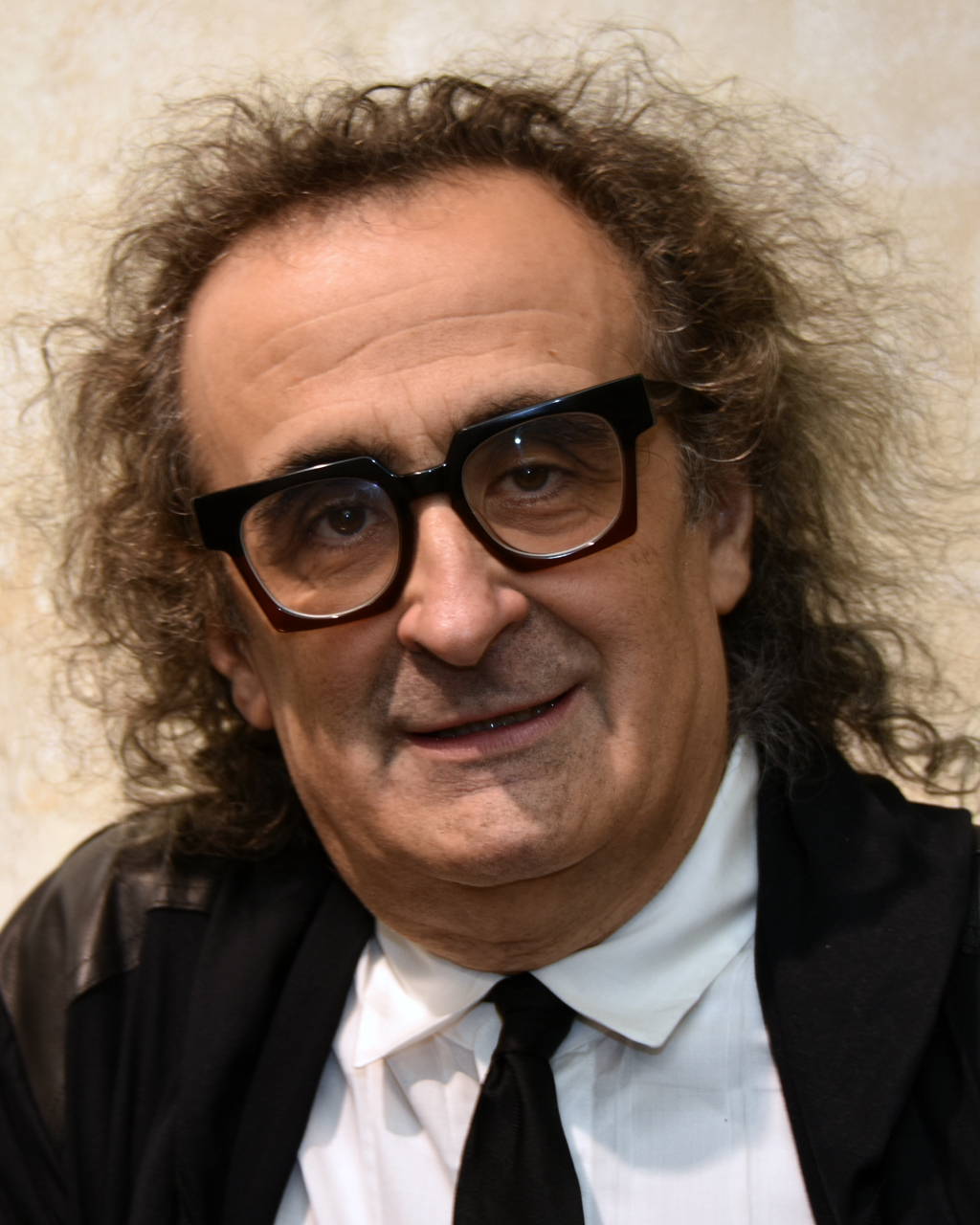
- Yigal Ozeri in 2019
- Born: 1958 (age 67–68); Israel
- Known for: Painting
- Movement: Contemporary art, Photorealism
- Children: Adam Ozeri
- Website: www.yigalozeriartist.com

Yigal Ozeri (Hebrew: יגאל עוזרי; born 1958) is an Israeli artist based in New York City. He is known for large-scale cinematic portraits of young women in landscapes. As one of the leading Photorealism painters, his large-scale oil paintings tend to capture ethereal scenes of women in nature. His son is Adam Ozeri, a professional soccer player.

== Biography ==
Yigal Ozeri was born in Israel in 1958. He currently lives and works in New York City.

In 1997, Ozeri collaborated with Israeli poet Ronny Someck to produce The Razor that Cut the Metaphoric Face of Poetry which included five etchings by Ozeri, and five ensuring poems by Someck. Ozeri's etchings, in order, were titled Pointed Tower, Tears of Buildings, Unbuilt Pagoda, Dirty Laundry, and Tears of Buildings II. The book itself was produced by The Cabri Print Workshop, based out of Kibbutz Cabri in the Western Galilee.

In 2014, he co-founded Mana Contemporary where he has a studio in the flagship, located in Jersey City.

== Influences ==
Originally an abstract painter, Ozer has developed a unique style of Photorealist painting since embracing realism in early 2000. Influenced by the Pre-Raphaelite works of the 1850s, his paintings possess a romantic sensibility not captured in works by the other Photorealists. He specifically cites Pre-Raphaelite painters Dante Gabriel Rossetti and John Everett Millais as inspirations, in both process and product.

A catalyst for his shift towards Photorealism has been largely accredited as well to Spanish Baroque painters. His encounter with Diego Velázquez's Las Meninas (1656) spurred his shift towards an exact representation, as Ozeri modernizes such traditional keystones of the art canon through technological mediums, shifting the visual aperture to that of the digitized depth of field. Velázquez's visual demarcations in his paintings suggest, in fact, the employment of the camera obscura, which assisted in achieving an exaggerated perspective and depth of field.

As a member of a generation of younger painters concerned with representation, he draws upon contemporaries such as Chuck Close, Gerhard Richter, and Andrew Wyeth.

== Style and technique ==
According to the Knoxville Museum of Art's curator Steven Wicks, Ozeri's compositions "probe the boundaries between painting and photography within the context of the Digital Age." Ozeri photographs his subjects, often strikingly beautiful women in nature. These figures evoke the aestheticism of late Romanticism subgenre––nineteenth-century melancholia associated with the ends of the pastoral and the rise of the urban. As these women wander throughout beautiful landscapes, their gaze turns inwards and pensive, adding a psychological layering of intimate experiences with the natural world––away from the screen-based––while hinting at the presence of boundless psychological landscapes.

While photographing his subjects, Ozeri supplies himself with multiple already-made images from which to choose. Photographic attributes include sharp focus of the subject, a shallow depth of field, and centered composition. These photographs are then projected onto a canvas with traced outlines. The projection is then removed, and the artist translates the forms into tiny painted color shapes that are gradually tightened and blended for varying degrees of focus. In his process of visual translation, Ozeri "preserves the handmade as a record of its own means of representation, rather than that of what it depicts." The painting thus serves as an act of abstraction, transcription, and transformation. This results in a painting that is formal and conceptually open to interpretation rather than merely a skillful rendering of appearances.

== Exhibitions ==
Yigal Ozeri has exhibited globally for decades, including solo exhibits in Bologna, Barcelona, Los Angeles, Toronto, Hong Kong, Amsterdam, France, Denmark, Peru, India, and Munich.

He participated in a traveling show titled 50 Years of Hyperrealistic Painting, showcased in a number of venues including Museum Thyssen-Bornemisza in Madrid, Birmingham Museum & Art Gallery, and Museo de Bellas Artes in Bilbao.

=== Selected solo exhibitions ===
==== 2010 ====
- Lizzie Smoking, Galería Senda, Barcelona, Spain
- Lizzie in the Snow, Mark Moore Gallery, Santa Monica, CA
- Desire for Anima, Contemporary by Angela Li, Hong Kong, China
- Olga in the Park, Galerie Brandt, Amsterdam, Netherlands

==== 2011 ====
- Territory, Martin Asbaek Gallery, Copenhagen, Denmark
- Territory, Zemack Contemporary Art Gallery, Tel Aviv, Israel
- Garden of the Gods, Mike Weiss Gallery, New York, NY
- Luce silenziosa (Silent light), Bologna, Italy

==== 2012 ====
- Territory, Mike Weiss Gallery, New York, NY
- Photorealism, Galerie de Bellefeuille, Montreal, Canada
- The Boathouse, Galerie Andreas Binder, Munich, Germany
- Territory, Karen Jenkins Johnson, San Francisco, CA
- Territory, Scott White Contemporary Art, La Jolla, CA

==== 2013 ====
- Territory, Angell Gallery, Toronto, Canada
- Triads, Galerie Brandt, Amsterdam, Netherlands

==== 2014 ====
- Fiction of Distance, Galería Álvaro Alcázar, Madrid, Spain
- Photorealism in the Digital Age, Mana Contemporary, Chicago, Illinois

==== 2017 ====
- The Storm, Zemack Gallery for Contemporary Art. Tel Aviv.

==== 2018 ====
- Yigal Ozeri: A New York Story, Louis K. Meisel Gallery. New York City.
- Personification, IMAGO Galleries, Palm Desert, CA
- Reflection, Whitestone Gallery, Tokyo, Japan
- In Pursuit of the Real, Cermak Eisenkraft Gallery, Prague, Czech Republic
- A New York Story, Galerie Andrea Binder, Munich, Germany

==== 2019 ====
- Reality Check, Zemack Contemporary Art, Tel-Aviv, Israel
- A New York Story, Rutger Brandt Gallery, Amsterdam, Netherlands

==== 2020 ====
- Yigal Ozeri, Flint Institute of Art, Flint, MI
- Liberated Paper, Galerie Edition Raphael, Frankfurt, Germany

==== 2024 ====
- Photorealism: Yigal Ozeri, Lilienthal Gallery, Knoxville, TN.

== Collections ==
Yigal Ozeri's art are in permanent collections of the Whitney Museum of American Art, the McNay Art Museum in San Antonio, the Jewish Museum of New York, The Israel Museum, Tel Aviv Museum of Art, Albertina and other public institutions. A few select paintings were recently acquired by the Smithsonian American Art Museum.
