= Scott Sassa =

American entertainment executive

- Born: Scott Michael Sassa; February 2, 1959 (age 67); Los Angeles, California, U.S.
- Education: University of Southern California (dropped out)
- Occupation: Businessman
- Spouse: Ellen Griffin (m. 1990)

Scott Michael Sassa (born February 2, 1959) is an American entertainment executive who has held a number of high-level executive positions in large entertainment companies. Sassa is currently chairman of MILK Makeup.

== Biography ==
=== Early career ===
Early in his career, Sassa was assistant in Gowan and Rogers.

Sassa joined Turner Broadcasting in 1982, first as director of sales promotion, then executive producer of Night Tracks in 1983 which led to him becoming vice president and general manager of the company's Cable Music Channel in 1984.

In 1985, Sassa became vice president of programming of Playboy Channel. Between 1986 and 1987, he also served as vice president of network management for the Fox Broadcasting Company. Sassa was among the first people hired by Fox and he ran its operations and administration departments. In 1987, Sassa left FBC to join Ohlmeyer Communications as vice president of new business development.

In 1988, Sassa returned to Turner Broadcasting, where he became executive president of TNT. In 1990, he was promoted as Turner Entertainment Networks' presindent. From 1992 to 1996, he was responsible for all operations and programming for TBS Superstation, TNT, Cartoon Network, Turner Classic Movies and Turner's international entertainment networks in Europe, Asia and Latin America.

Sassa recruited Amy Pascal to start up Turner Pictures, a feature film production company that developed and produced You've Got Mail, Any Given Sunday and Gettysburg. Sassa was also responsible for Turner Home Video, Turner Licensing and Merchandising, Turner Publishing, Turner New Media, Turner Original Productions and Hanna-Barbera Cartoons Inc.

After Turner, Sassa was president and chief operating officer of Andrews Group, a unit of MacAndrews & Forbes Holding, and president and chief executive officer of Marvel Entertainment.

=== NBC ===
Sassa joined NBC in September 1997 as president of the NBC Television Stations division. In this position, he was responsible for overseeing the operation of NBC's 13 owned-and-operated television stations.

From May 1999, Sassa served as president of NBC West Coast, responsible for overseeing all of NBC's entertainment-related businesses and reported to Bob Wright, chairman and chief executive officer, NBC. Sassa made the transition to that position after working with his predecessor, Don Ohlmeyer, and serving as president of NBC Entertainment since October 1998. During this time, he oversaw the development and production of NBC's new primetime series, including such shows as The West Wing, Freaks and Geeks, Law & Order: Special Victims Unit and Fear Factor. Under Sassa, NBC was the number-one network three out of four seasons.

=== Friendster ===
From 2004 to 2005, Sassa served as president and CEO of Friendster, a top 50 Internet site that pioneered social networking. Friendster was backed by Kleiner Perkins and Benchmark Capital. After Friendster, he served as Residence with Kleiner Perkins, a leading technology venture capital firm.

=== Hearst ===
Sassa joined Hearst in 2008, where he was president of Hearst Entertainment & Syndication, the operating group responsible for Hearst's interests in cable television networks, including ESPN, Lifetime, A&E and History; television production and distribution; newspaper syndication; and merchandise licensing. In February 2013 Hearst Ventures became part of the Entertainment & syndication group. He left Hearst after executives became aware of an extortion plot involving a stripper with whom he was sexting.

=== El Rey Network ===
Sassa was vice chairman of El Rey Network, a new US cable network founded by director Robert Rodriguez, from 2013 to 2015.

Business positions
Preceded by Warren Littlefield	President of NBC Entertainment; 1998-1999	Succeeded by Garth Ancier
Preceded by Don Ohlmeyer	President, NBC, West Coast; 1999-2002	Succeeded by
