= Evolve USA =

US nonprofit organization

- Formation: June 25, 2013
- Founders: Rebecca Bond and Jon Bond
- Tax ID no.: 30-0792448
- Legal status: 501(c)(3) nonprofit organization
- Purpose: Gun safety
- Headquarters: New York, New York, U.S.
- Coordinates: 40.734429°N 73.996545°W
- Director: Rebecca Bond
- Co-director: Jon Bond
- Revenue: $30,000 (2016)
- Expenses: $31,100 (2016)
- Website: evolveusa.com
- Formerly called: Evolve Together

Evolve USA is a 501(c)(3) nonprofit organization that advocates for gun safety. In contrast to many groups involved in gun politics in the United States, Evolve focuses on individual, voluntary actions to prevent accidental shootings. It was founded in 2013, after the Sandy Hook Elementary School shooting.

In 2015 they ran an ad campaign that caught media attention for its humour, using "hilarious social faux pas to illustrate the danger of keeping guns in the house."
