= Mana Contemporary =

Cultural center in Jersey City, New Jersey

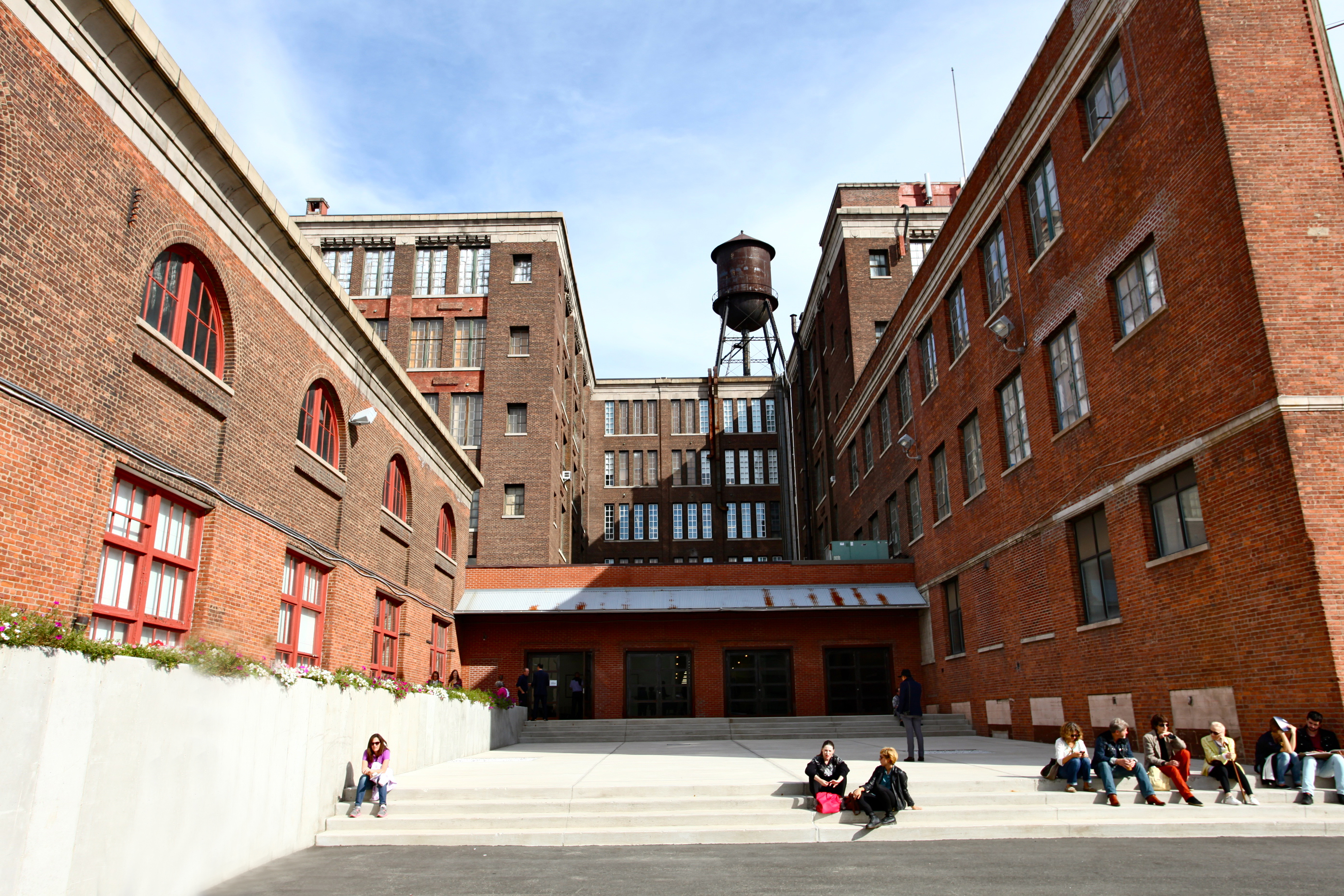
- Mana Contemporary, installation shot
- Established: 2011
- Location: 888 Newark Avenue; Jersey City, New Jersey
- Coordinates: 40.7371°N 74.0705°W
- Type: Contemporary art center
- Director: Kele McComsey
- Public transit access: Journal Square
- Website: Official website

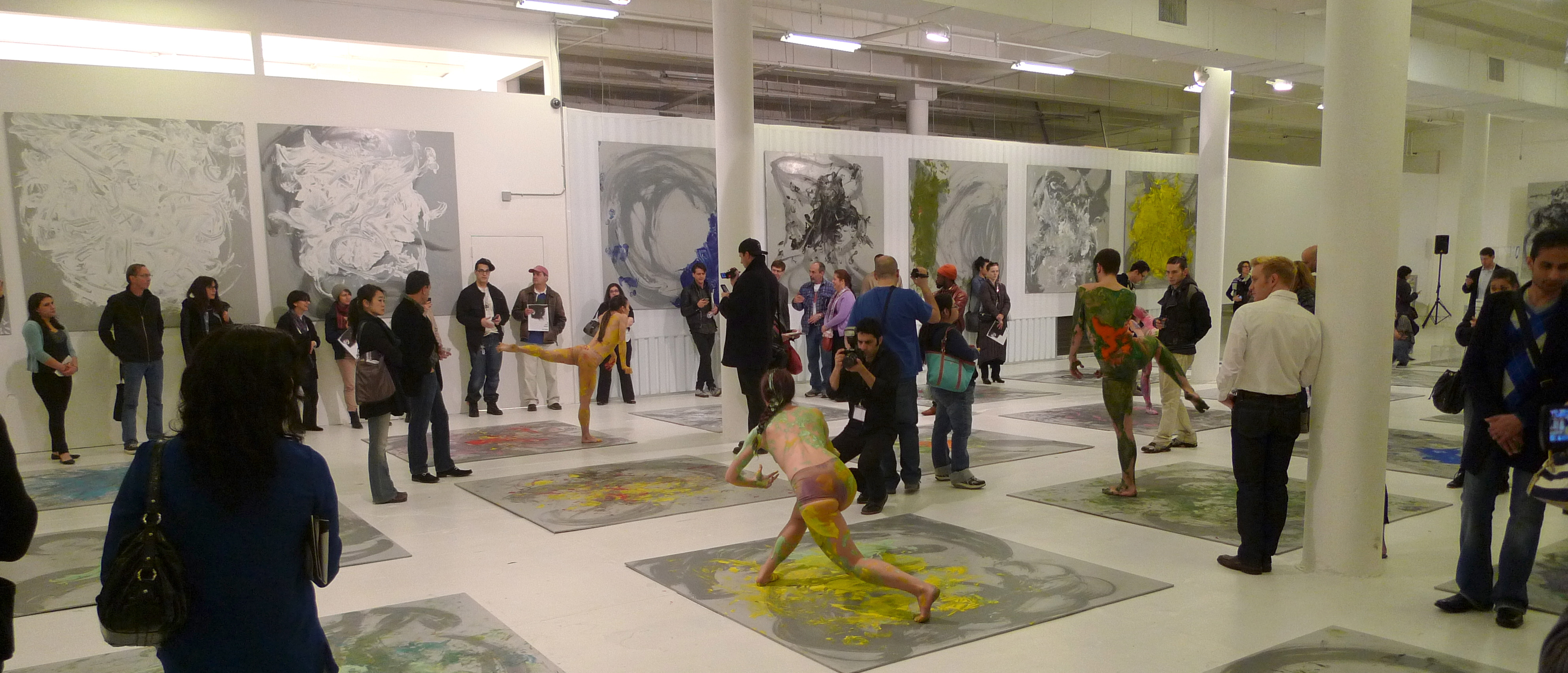
Opening performance by Shen Wei

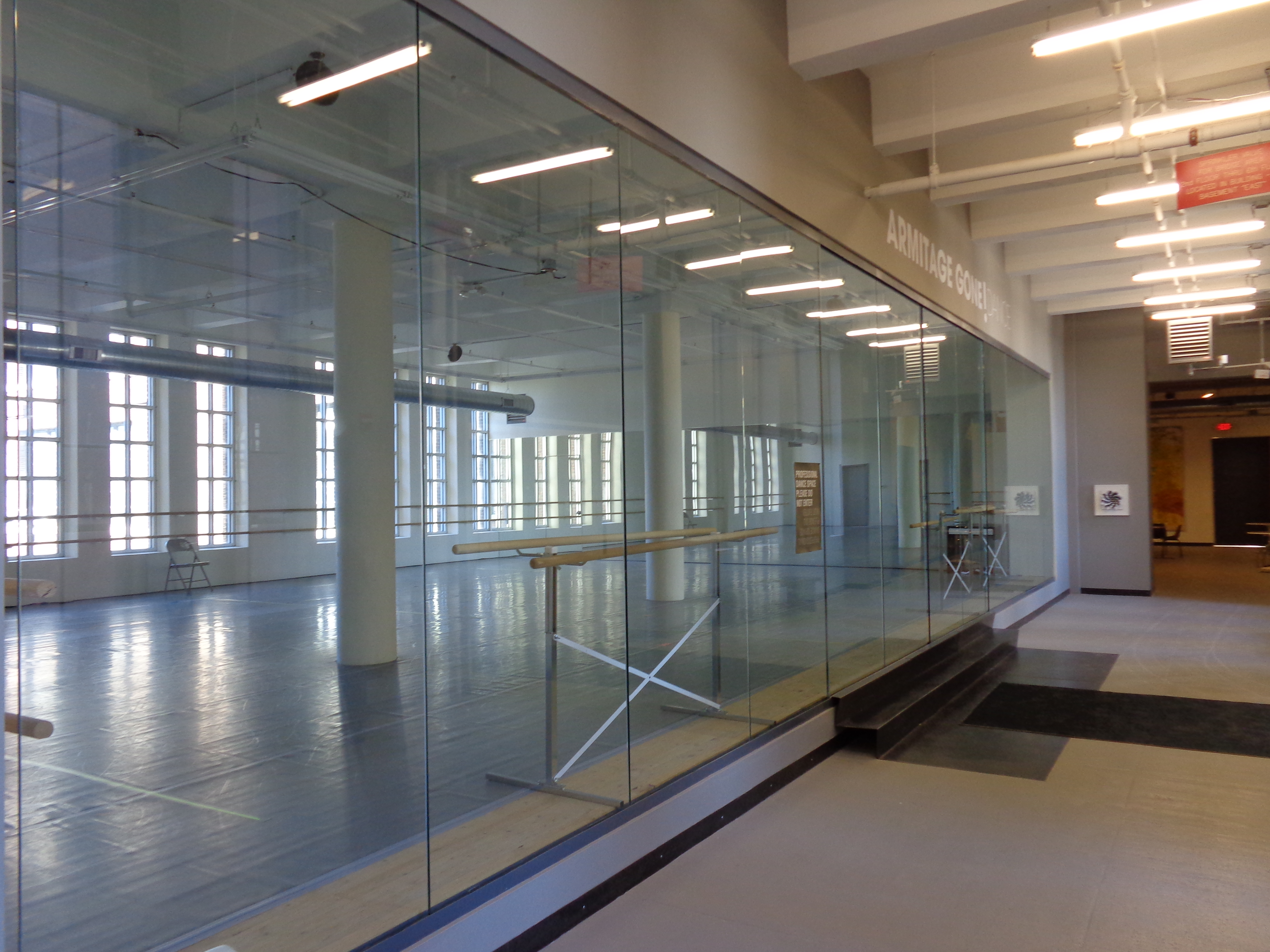
Dance studio

Mana Contemporary is a cultural center in Jersey City, New Jersey, United States with affiliated centers in Chicago and Miami.

== History and founder ==
Opened in May 2011, the center was founded by moving company mogul Moishe Mana. Shai Baitel and the artist Yigal Ozeri are among the co-founders.

The 1 million-square-foot facility in Jersey City is situated in a 1920s-era brick former manufacturing building in the city's Marion Section near Marion Junction that is also an extension of the fine arts transportation department of Moishe's Moving Systems.

In 2021 Mana Contemporary's Executive Director Eugene Lemay was placed on administrative leave due to his indictment of tax fraud and conspiracy for evading to pay nearly $8 million to the IRS while helping to run Moishe's Moving Systems.

In February 2022, Kele McComsey was appointed Mana's new director. McComsey was the President and Senior Partner of SurroundArt prior to joining Mana Contemporary in 2015.

== Art centers ==
The Jersey City center provides services, spaces, and programming for artists, collectors, curators, performers, students and the community. It includes artist studios, exhibition spaces, and storage, and is home to the Middle East Center for the Arts (MECA); the archives of the International Center of Photography; the estates of Jonas Mekas, Walter de Maria, Irving Penn, and Dan Flavin among others; the Magnum Foundation; and foundations established by Eileen S Kaminsky (ESKFF) and Carole Feuerman, as well as the artist Amy Sherald who has her studio there.

The Chicago art center gives spaces, a library, and programming for artists, artisans, curators, performers, students and the community.

The Miami art center lends space to artist studios, exhibitions, and programming to allow conversation and collaboration in the community.

== Richard Meier Model Museum ==
The building is also home to the Richard Meier Model Museum, an exhibition of architectural projects, sculptures and collages by Richard Meier.

== Mana Decentralized ==
Mana Decentralized is an online and physical platform selling artworks directly to collectors, launched in April 2019.

== See also ==
- India Square
- Hudson County exhibition spaces
- Jersey City Museum
- Museum of Russian Art
- 111 First Street
- The Powerhouse
