= Mazdack Rassi =

Iranian-American real estate and creative entrepreneur

- Born: 1970 (age 55–56); Tehran, Iran
- Known for: Co-Founder of Milk Studios

Mazdack Rassi (born 1970) is an Iranian-American real estate and creative entrepreneur. He is best known as the co-founder of Milk Studios with partners Erez Shternlicht and Moishe Mana, as a co-founder of Milk Makeup and Camp David in Brooklyn, New York.

== Early life ==
Rassi was born in Tehran, Iran. His family left the country because of the Iranian Revolution and moved to rural Champaign, Illinois at the age of nine. Rassi's father, a Cornell graduate and former Iranian diplomat, went from being an educator in Iran to a professor at the University of Illinois. His mother found work in the costume department.

In 1994, Rassi dropped out of community college, borrowed $500 from his mother, and moved to New York City. He began working "two or three jobs," from splitting falafel to working at the Gap.

== Milk Studios ==
After earning his real estate license, Rassi rented an apartment to his two future partners, then unbeknownst to him, Erez Shternlicht and Moisha Mana. He later convinced the duo to open a photography studio in the Meatpacking District with him and to let him run it. This became Milk Studios, a media conglomerate that now is a hub for fashion, photography, casting, videography, media publishing, and cosmetics

== Industry visibility ==
Mazdack Rassi was instrumental in helping launch the careers of young fashion creators Alexander Wang, Joseph Altuzarra, Hood By Air, Cushnie et Ochs, via MADE Fashion Week, a program he started at Milk Studios with co-founders Jenné Lombardo and Keith Baptista. Tattoo artist Scott Campbell partnered with Rassi and MILK Studios to host the "Whole Glory" show. Rassi is a regular VIP at widely covered fashion events and music concerts.

== Personal life ==
Rassi is married to Zanna Roberts Rassi, senior fashion editor at Marie Claire and correspondent on E!. They live in Chelsea, Manhattan, with two daughters - Rumi and Juno.

== Charity and Honors ==
Rassi serves on the Parsons Board of Governors, New York City Ballet Board of Directors and the Board of Burton Snowboards. He was the honoree of Make-A-Wish's 2016 Power of a Wish Gala. He also co-hosted the first annual Autism Tomorrow benefit.
