= Top Model Curves =

- Genre: Reality television
- Presented by: Lina Rafn; Janka Polliani; Jonas Hallberg
- Countries of origin: Scandinavia; (Denmark, Norway, Sweden)
- No. of seasons: 1
- No. of episodes: 24

Production
- Running time: 60 minutes

Original release
- Network: TV3
- Release: August 30 – November 16, 2016

Top Model Curves is the second Scandinavian edition of Top Model. The series sees a number of plus-size aspiring models from Denmark, Norway and Sweden. They competed against each other in a variety of challenges to determine who will win title of the next "top model" of Scandinavia along a lucrative modelling contract, and other prizes in the hope of a successful future in the modeling industry. The series was presented by Danish singer and songwriter Lina Rafn, Norwegian fashion journalist and television personality Janka Polliani, and Swedish fashion stylist Jonas Hallberg.

== Cycles ==
Cycle	Premiere date	Winner	Runner-up	Other contestants in order of elimination	Number of contestants	International Destinations
1 Lisbon	30 August 2016	Ronja Manfredsson	Malene Riis Sørensen	Janina Karlman, Martine Halvorsen (quit) & MC Christensen, Linda Selmoni, Anne-Mette Tassing, Mette Elofsson, Charlotte Skogrand Bø, Guro Mangen, Helena Thompson, Kathleen Ladani, Paulina Perger, Benedicte Haugaard, Lovisa Reuter, Maria Esbo, Jannie Gefle, Aida Almquist Sowe	18	
