= Moishe's Moving Systems =

Moving and self-storage company

- Industry: Moving and storage, Logistics
- Headquarters: Fenton, Missouri, U.S.
- Website: www.moishes.com

Moishe's Moving Systems is a New York-based moving and self-storage company.

The founder, Moishe Mana began as a "man with a van". By 1990, it had become the largest independent moving company in New York City. By 1995, they were the largest in the entire tri-state area. Today, Moishe’s Moving owns a conglomerate of 15 companies.

== Tax avoidance schemes ==
Multiple persons involved in managing Moishe's Moving Systems have been prosecuted for tax evasion, including Eugene Lemay, Joel Lingat, Salman Rami Haim, and Nissim Fadida.

== See also ==
- Mana Contemporary
