= Flateby =

Flateby, Norway
- Village
- Location in Akershus
- Coordinates: 59°50′N 11°10′E
- Country: Norway
- Region: Østlandet
- County: Akershus
- District: Enebakk
- Time zone: UTC+01:00 (CET)
  - Summer (DST): UTC+02:00 (CEST)

Flateby is a village in Enebakk municipality, Norway. Its population is 3,298.
