= Moishe Mana =

American businessman and developer

- משה מאנה
- Born: 1956 or 1957 (age 68–69); Tel Aviv, Israel
- Citizenship: American
- Education: Tel Aviv University (dropped out)
- Occupations: Businessman, Real estate developer
- Known for: Founder of companies Moishe's Moving Systems, GRM Information Management, developer of Mana Contemporary

Moishe Mana (Hebrew: משה מאנה; born 1956) is an American billionaire businessman and real estate developer. Originally from Israel, Mana emigrated to the US in 1983, where he founded his first business, Moishe's Moving Systems. He has founded businesses that include GRM Information Management and Moishe's Moving Systems. He has developed properties that include Mana Contemporary and Milk Studios. He is also the largest private land owner and developer in downtown Miami.

== Early life and education ==
Moishe grew up in the Hatikva neighborhood of Tel Aviv, the second of five children in a poor family. His parents were Iraqi-born immigrants who worked in various businesses, including real estate. After serving as an intelligence officer in the IDF, he studied law at Tel Aviv University for a year before leaving to pursue business in the private sector.

== Career ==
=== Early career with Moishe Movers ===
Moishe moved to New York City in 1983 with little money, sleeping on park benches and working as a dishwasher in Greenwich Village. He transitioned into the construction industry, where a short-on-cash employer allowed him the use of the company van at night in lieu of wages. Realizing that anyone with a van could start a moving company, Moishe saved enough money to purchase his own. He began hiring other Israeli immigrants, launching Moishe's Moving Logistics in New York City. Within six years, it became one of New York City's top residential movers.

=== GRM Information Management ===
By the late 1980s Moishe's Movers had become the largest moving company in the tri-state area, purchasing warehouse space and offering storage. In 1986, he launched GRM Information Management in Jersey City, New Jersey as a document storage company. The idea for GRM came when Mana discovered many of his commercial clients of Moishe's Movers storing file boxes in storage units. It later began offering digital storage of documents beginning in 2007. Avner Schneur joined GRM as its CEO in 2011, expanding the companies digital storage business. In 2016, Bloomberg valued the company at $200 million and it was employing 1,000 people with $100 million in revenue. By 2017, it had 15 warehouses across the United States, maintaining documents for 7,000 clients. It also became the first company to use barcodes for storage in its warehouses.

By 1998, he had amassed more than 1.5 million square feet of commercial real estate.

=== MILK Studios ===
In 1995, Mana began to focus on the Meatpacking District of New York City, which was then an underdeveloped part of Manhattan. Fashion entrepreneur Mazdack Rassi convinced him to convert one of his mini storage facilities into an event and office space, and he created MILK Studios.

Mana opened MILK Studios branch in Los Angeles, and went on to start a number of related companies including MILK Agency, a brand development outfit; Velem, a post production studio; Milk Makeup; and House Casting.

=== MANA Contemporary ===
By the late 2000s Mana had become a contemporary art collector. In 2009, he partnered with Eugene Lemay to assemble over two million square feet of empty warehouses in Jersey City, New Jersey for the purposes of disrupting the art storage market. He later turned the assemblage into an art community called Mana Contemporary.

In October 2021 Eugene Lemay was removed from his role as Executive Director of Mana Contemporary after his indictment to defraud the IRS for his attempt to evade $7.8 million in payroll taxes while he was President of Moishe's Movers . In January of 2025, Lemay was found guilty and was sentenced to "21 months imprisonment on each count to be served concurrently, followed by two years of supervised release on each count to be served concurrently".

Mana later opened a MANA Contemporary in the Chicago neighborhood of Pilsen. The Pilsen cultural complex is composed of the 450,000 square foot building plus additional land marked for residential and commercial development.

=== Real estate development ===
In 2009, Moishe Mana began investing in Miami by purchasing warehouses and vacant lots in the Wynwood neighborhood. The result was MANA Wynwood, an assemblage that accommodates productions from feature films and television shows to events and trade shows, doubling as a convention center or concert venue. He also began purchasing properties in the Flagler district which included $375 million on 60 properties. By 2025, Mana had assembled approximately 80 properties in Miami, making him the largest landowner in downtown Miami.

== Political activism and philanthropy ==
Mana has vocally opposed Donald Trump, offering to donate $2 million to the charity of Trump's choice if he released his tax returns back in 2016. Mana had also placed a naked statue of Trump on the top of Mana's Wynwood offices and previously commissioned a large mural of Trump which luridly depicted him as The Joker from The Dark Knight. The mural was modified after the election by the original artists to remove Trump's likeness.

Mana donated $10 million to Florida International University's CARTA (College of Communication, Architecture + The Arts) Program. The gift is $2.5 million in cash and an in-kind donation of 15,000 square feet of studio and classroom space at MANA Wynwood.
