= Sabina Karlsson =

Swedish plus-size model (born 1988)

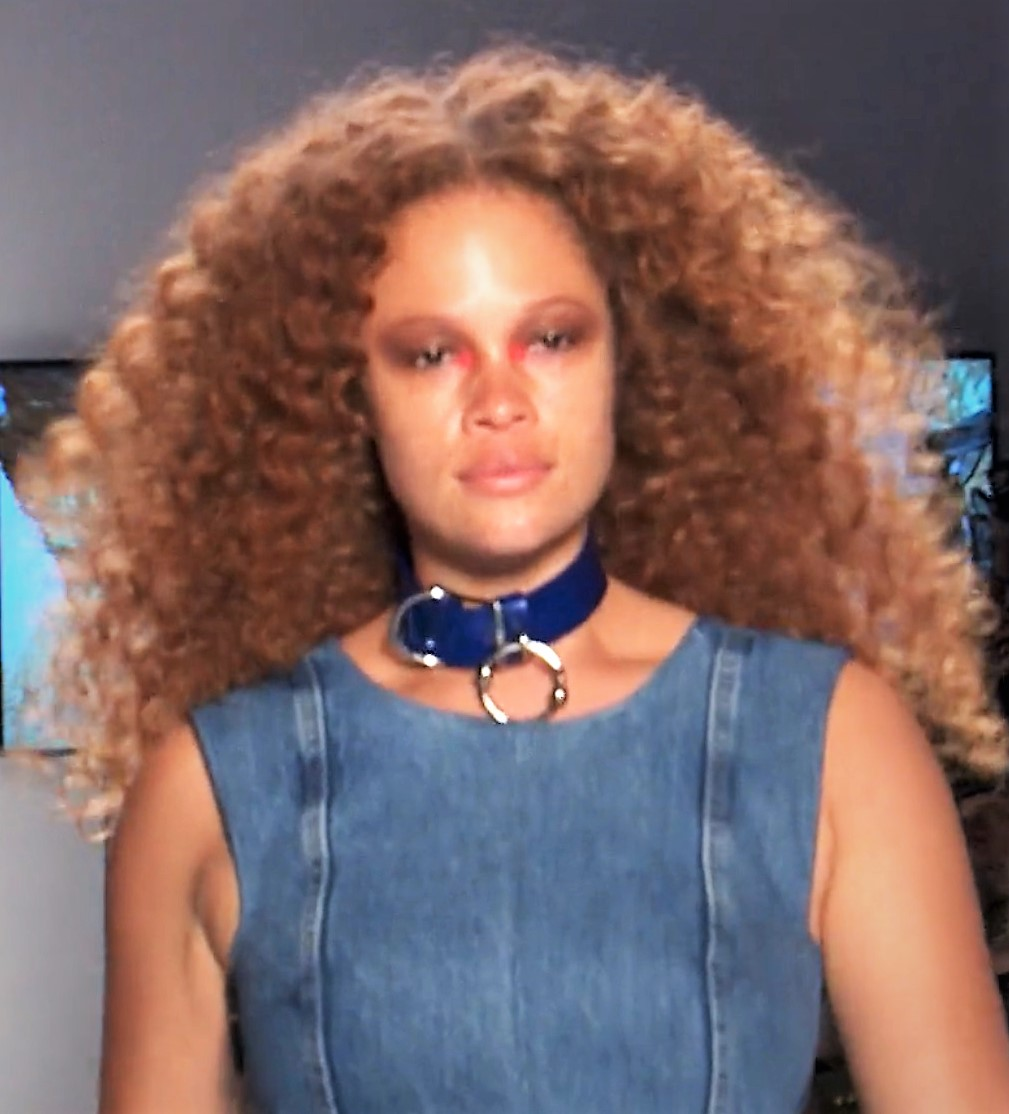
- Karlsson at New York Fashion Week 2018
- Born: Växjö, Sweden
- Occupation: Model
- Children: 1
- Modeling information
- Height: 5 ft 11 in (1.80 m)
- Hair color: Red
- Eye color: Brown
- Agency: JAG Models (New York); Milk Management (London); Modellink (Gothenburg); the wonders (Stockholm); MODELWERK (Hamburg)

Sabina Karlsson is a Swedish plus-size model.

== Early life ==
Karlsson is of Gambian descent through her mother, and Swedish descent through her father.

== Career ==
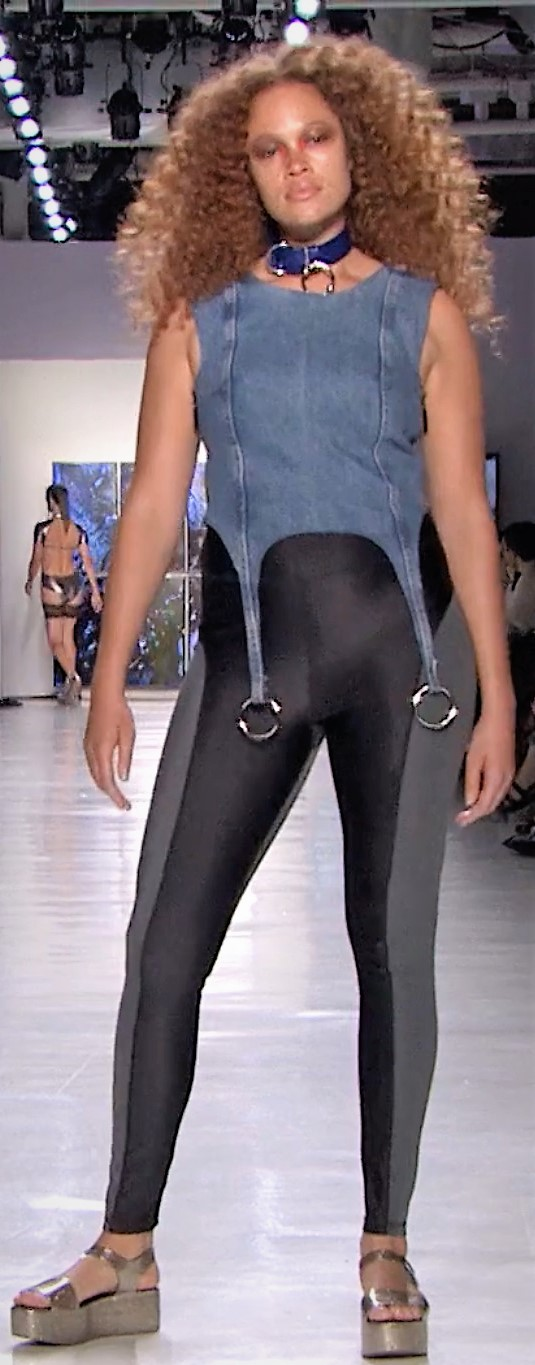
Karlsson modeling the Chromat Spring-Summer 2018 Serenity Collection at New York Fashion Week

Karlsson started modeling at age 4; she was discovered in a Swedish hair salon. She was originally a straight size model, working for Teen Vogue, Jean-Paul Gaultier and Armani, but changed to plus size modeling in 2010 so that she could maintain her natural weight. She struggled to shrink down to a size 2 at age 17. As a plus size model she has walked the runway for Michael Kors, Christian Siriano, and Chromat. She has modeled for H&M, J. Crew, Levi's, Lane Bryant, River Island, L'Oreal, Maybelline, and Victoria's Secret.

She has appeared in American Vogue, and Glamour.

== Personal life ==
She gave birth to a son in June 2018.
