= Malin Persson =

Swedish model and costume maker

- Born: April 26, 1979 (age 47); Osby, Skåne, Sweden
- Spouse: Damiano Mazzarella
- Modeling information
- Height: 5 ft 10 in (1.78 m)
- Hair color: Blonde
- Eye color: Blue

Malin Persson (born April 26, 1979, in Osby, Skåne, Sweden) is a fashion model from Sweden. Persson works as a full-time model, mainly in Paris, New York City and Milan. She lives in Malmö with her sons Tiago, Chleo and Milo.

== Modeling career ==
Persson has worked for famous designers such as Chanel, Karl Lagerfeld, Dior, Givenchy and Dolce & Gabbana. She signed on various agencies such as 1 Model Management, NEXT Models, and Mikas Stockholm. Persson has been seen in campaigns such as Chanel, ETRO, Paul Smith, Lagerfeld gallery, D&G, Shiseido, Malo, etc. She has worked on film projects such as Hot Dog, Puritan and Messages. Also, she has functioned as a custom buyer and a custom assistant. She has opened a very successful bar named "Salotto42" in Rome, where she now lives with her husband Damiano Mazzarella and 2 kids, Tiago (4) and Milo (2).

Persson became known when she hosted Scandinavia's Next Top Model, where she encouraged Swedish girls to fulfill their modeling ambitions. Previously, Mini Anden was the host, but Persson replaced her due to criticism of Anden. Later on, she also left the show and was replaced by Swedish model Vendela Kirsebom as a host for Cycle 4.
